= Keep an Eye on the Sky =

Box set by Big Star
- Released: 15 September 2009
- Genre: Power pop
- Length: 305:18
- Label: Rhino

Big Star chronology
In Space (2005)	Keep an Eye on the Sky (2009)

Professional ratings
Review scores
Source	Rating
Allmusic	4.5/5 stars
Pitchfork Media	(9.3/10)
PopMatters	10/10 stars

Keep an Eye on the Sky is a 4-CD, 98-song career retrospective box set from American rock group Big Star, released in 2009. It features 52 unreleased tracks: demos, alternate takes, and live performances. As well as material from founder member Chris Bell's earlier bands Rock City and Icewater, it includes all titles (in many cases as alternate mixes or demos) from Big Star's first three studio albums, #1 Record, Radio City, and Third/Sister Lovers, and a recording of a 1973 Big Star concert. Staged in January at Lafayette's Music Room, the Memphis venue used again in May for the Rock Writers' Convention, the concert took place after Bell's departure and before the remainder of the group began work on Radio City. The box set's liner notes won a 2011 Grammy Award for author Robert Gordon.

== Track listing ==
Disc one

1. "Psychedelic Stuff" (original mix) – Chris Bell - 3:05
2. "All I See Is You" – Icewater - 3:30
3. "Every Day as We Grow Closer" (original mix) – Alex Chilton - 2:28
4. "Try Again" (early version) – Rock City - 3:38
5. "Feel" - 3:33
6. "The Ballad of El Goodo" - 4:20
7. "In the Street" (alternate mix) - 2:55
8. "Thirteen" (alternate mix) - 2:39
9. "Don't Lie to Me" - 3:09
10. "The India Song" (alternate mix) - 2:24
11. "When My Baby's Beside Me" (alternate mix) - 3:28
12. "My Life Is Right" (alternate mix) - 3:17
13. "Give Me Another Chance" (alternate mix) - 3:29
14. "Try Again" - 3:33
15. "Gone with the Light" - 2:45
16. "Watch the Sunrise" (single version) - 3:12
17. "ST 100/6" (alternate mix) - 0:55
18. "The Preacher" (Excerpt) – Rock City - 0:57
19. "In the Street" (alternate single mix) - 3:01
20. "Feel" (alternate mix) - 3:33
21. "The Ballad of El Goodo" (alternate lyrics) - 4:32
22. "The India Song" (alternate version) - 2:11
23. "Country Morn" - 3:13
24. "I Got Kinda Lost" (demo) - 3:35
25. "Back of a Car" (demo) - 3:17
26. "Motel Blues" (demo) (Loudon Wainwright III) - 3:04

Disc two

1. "There Was a Light" (demo) - 3:44
2. "Life Is White" (demo) - 3:17
3. "What's Going Ahn" (demo) - 2:16
4. "O My Soul" - 5:39
5. "Life Is White" - 3:19
6. "Way Out West" - 2:51
7. "What's Going Ahn" - 2:42
8. "You Get What You Deserve" - 3:06
9. "Mod Lang" (alternate mix) - 2:49
10. "Back of a Car" (alternate mix) - 2:48
11. "Daisy Glaze" - 3:50
12. "She's a Mover" - 3:14
13. "September Gurls" - 2:47
14. "Morpha Too" (alternate mix) - 1:29
15. "I'm in Love with a Girl" - 1:49
16. "O My Soul" (alternate version) - 5:10
17. "She's a Mover" (alternate version) - 3:17
18. "Daisy Glaze" (rehearsal version) - 3:55
19. "I Am the Cosmos" – Chris Bell - 3:43
20. "You and Your Sister" – Chris Bell - 3:12
21. "Blue Moon" (demo) - 2:09
22. "Femme Fatale" (demo) (Lou Reed) - 2:49
23. "Thank You Friends" (demo) - 2:50
24. "Nightime" (demo) - 2:14
25. "Take Care" (demo) - 1:37
26. "You Get What You Deserve" (demo) - 3:21

Disc three

1. "Lovely Day" (demo) - 1:51
2. "Downs" (demo) - 1:28
3. "Jesus Christ" (demo) - 2:31
4. "Holocaust" (demo) - 3:35
5. "Big Black Car" (alternate demo) - 4:42
6. "Manana" - 0:48
7. "Jesus Christ" - 2:21
8. "Femme Fatale" - 3:30
9. "O, Dana" - 2:36
10. "Kizza Me" - 2:44
11. "You Can't Have Me" - 3:19
12. "Nightime" - 2:53
13. "Dream Lover" - 3:34
14. "Big Black Car" - 3:38
15. "Blue Moon" - 2:07
16. "Holocaust" - 3:49
17. "Stroke It Noel" - 2:07
18. "For You" - 2:44
19. "Downs" - 1:54
20. "Whole Lotta Shakin' Goin' On" - 3:24
21. "Kanga Roo" - 3:46
22. "Thank You Friends" - 3:07
23. "Take Care" - 2:50
24. "Lovely Day" - 2:09
25. "Till the End of the Day" (alternate mix) (Ray Davies) - 2:14
26. "Nature Boy' (alternate mix) - 2:39

Disc four – Live at Lafayette's Music Room, Memphis, TN, January 1973

1. "When My Baby's Beside Me" - 3:29
2. "My Life Is Right" - 3:25
3. "She's a Mover" - 4:07
4. "Way Out West" - 2:42
5. "The Ballad of El Goodo" - 4:21
6. "In the Street" - 2:51
7. "Back of a Car" - 2:41
8. "Thirteen" - 3:02
9. "The India Song" - 2:25
10. "Try Again" - 3:20
11. "Watch the Sunrise" - 4:02
12. "Don't Lie to Me" - 4:10
13. "Hot Burrito #2" - 3:50
14. "I Got Kinda Lost" - 2:57
15. "Baby Strange" - 4:11
16. "Slut" - 3:35
17. "There Was a Light" - 3:26
18. "ST 100/6" - 3:56
19. "Come On Now" - 1:54
20. "O My Soul" - 5:41

Enhanced CD bonus video: "Thirteen" (Alternate Mix)
