= Back of a Car =

Song by Big Star released in 1974

Song by Big Star

from the album Radio City
- Released: 1974
- Recorded: 1973
- Genre: Power pop
- Length: 2:46
- Label: Ardent
- Songwriter: Alex Chilton
- Producers: John Fry and Big Star

"Back of a Car" is a song credited to Alex Chilton and Andy Hummel that was first released by Big Star on their 1974 album Radio City. According to Hummel, Chris Bell contributed to writing the song as well.

== Writing ==
"Back of a Car" was one of the earliest songs written for Radio City. It was a song that Chilton, Hummel and Bell worked on before Bell left the band. At the time, Chilton and Bell split up the songs that they had worked on together, and "Back of a Car" was one of the songs that was assigned to Chilton. Although uncredited, Hummel has acknowledged that Bell was the principle writer of the song. After the song was released Bell asked to have his name added to the credits but the request was denied.

Hummel described the lyrics as being related to "his own teenage experience, cruising Memphis' hamburger joints and other hangouts in his father's Lincoln, blasting a Led Zeppelin tape."

== Personnel ==
- Alex Chilton - vocals, guitars
- Andy Hummel - bass guitar
- Jody Stephens - drums

== Reception ==
Bruce Eaton described "Back of a Car" as "the album's standard bearer for straight-ahead, unadulterated power pop – a track that would have easily held its own, if not stood out, on Beatles for Sale. Allmusic critic Denise Sullivan said that "an arpeggio guitar figure (a lot like Badfinger, later copied by R.E.M.'s Peter Buck) and the jingle-jangle of '60s folk-rock merge" on the song. Sullivan particularly praised Chilton's guitar playing as well as his "convincingly aching/pent-up/desirous vocal." Music journalist John M. Borack praised the song as an "anthem" and a "stellar track". Rolling Stone critic Ken Barnes described the song as a "shimmering pop delight." Stereo Review critic Steve Simels described the song as one of the "standout tracks" on Radio City. Music critic Rob Gieringer described it as "one of the best pop songs ever written." The Sacramento Bee critic Gene Sculatti described it as containing "one of those distinctly Big Star-ry folk-rock vocals, silverspun like some Byrds 12-string spiral."

Singer-songwriter Bill Lloyd listed "Back of a Car" as one of his top ten songs, saying that it is the first song [he would] play for someone who never heard of Big Star." Lloyd described the song as having "big sound" with "chiming guitars and crashing drums" and suggested that Chilton's willingness to write about teendom despite being in his 20s became a cliche for future power pop bands.

== Live versions ==
"Back of a Car" was later released on Big Star's live album Live, recorded in 1974 and released in 1992, and the live album Columbia: Live at Missouri University, recorded with a reconstituted line-up in 1993 and released the same year.
