= Live (Big Star album) =

Live album by Big Star
- Released: February 21, 1992
- Recorded: March 1974
- Studios: Ultrasonic Studios, New York City
- Genre: Power pop
- Length: 48:49
- Label: Rykodisc
- Producer: Big Star

Big Star chronology
Third/Sister Lovers (1978)	Live (1992)	Columbia: Live at Missouri University 4/25/93 (1993)

Professional ratings
Review scores
Source	Rating
AllMusic	3.5/5 stars
Robert Christgau	(3-star Honorable Mention)
Spin Alternative Record Guide	4/10

Live is a live album by American power pop group Big Star recorded in 1974 direct to two-track at Ultrasonic Studios, New York for WLIR and released in 1992.

The album was reissued in 2019 under the title Live on WLIR, via Omnivore Records.

== Track listing ==
1. "September Gurls" – 3:12
2. "Way Out West" – 2:41
3. "Mod Lang" – 2:38
4. "Don't Lie to Me" – 3:29
5. "O My Soul" – 5:31
6. "Interview" – 2:54
7. "The Ballad of El Goodo" – 3:54
8. "Thirteen" – 2:54
9. "I'm in Love with a Girl" – 2:04
10. "Motel Blues" – 3:10
11. "In the Street" – 2:55
12. "You Get What You Deserve" – 3:29
13. "Daisy Glaze" – 3:48
14. "Back of a Car" – 2:30
15. "She's a Mover" – 3:31

== Personnel ==
Big Star

- Alex Chilton – vocals, guitars
- John Lightman – bass guitar
- Jody Stephens – drums, lead vocals on "Way Out West"
