= O My Soul =

Song by Big Star released in 1974

Single by Big Star

from the album Radio City
- B-side: "Morpha Too"/"I'm in Love with a Girl"
- Released: 1974
- Recorded: 1973
- Genre: Power pop
- Length: 2:47 (single version); 5:40 (album version)
- Label: Ardent
- Songwriter: Alex Chilton
- Producers: John Fry and Big Star

Big Star singles chronology
"Thirteen" (1974)	"O My Soul" (1974)	"September Gurls" (1974)

"O My Soul" is a song credited to Alex Chilton that was first released by Big Star on their 1974 album Radio City. Chris Bell contributed to the lyrics. The song was also released as a single.

== Writing and recording ==
"O My Soul" was one of the earliest songs written for Radio City. It was a song that Chilton and Bell worked on before Bell left the band. At the time, Chilton and Bell split up the songs that they had worked on together, and "O My Soul" was one of the songs that was assigned to Chilton. According to Chilton, Bell contributed to the lyrics but Chilton wrote all the music. After the song was released Bell asked to have his name added to the credits but the request was denied.

Chilton originally recorded "O My Soul" without Big Star, with Richard Rosebrough playing drums and Danny Jones playing bass guitar. Big Star recorded two versions. The released version has Chilton playing both guitar and Mellotron. Big Star bassist Andy Hummel recalled that his bass parts were overdubbed. Hummel also recalled that Jody Stephens was trying to get an unusual drum sound, saying "Jody's playing lots of sort of broken rolls and stuff, almost like an eclectic drum solo throughout the song or something."

Over five minutes long, "O My Soul" is longer than any other song in Big Star’s discography. It also has an unusual structure. It starts with an instrumental version of an entire verse before the vocal enters 45 seconds in. Hummel recalled trying to make the song sound different than the traditional Big Star song, and that they made it sound more "sparse" than previous Big Star songs. Hummel said that it "starts off like it's going to be a traditional Big Star rock song, but then Alex started adding other parts different than the original line."

Bruce Eaton described the song as sounding like "the perfect set-opener for a killer live band", saying that "With its persistent stutter-stop skewed-soul guitar riff, garage rock Mellotron, explosive off-kilter drum fills, country-flavored guitar solo, and driving bass line, it serves loud notice that Radio City is not paint-by-numbers power pop."

== Personnel ==
- Alex Chilton - vocals, guitars, keyboards
- Andy Hummel - bass guitar
- Jody Stephens - drums

== Reception ==
AllMusic critic Mark Deming called "O My Soul" "a gloriously messy hodgepodge of slashed-out R&B rhythms, psychedelic chord twists, and smart pop melodicism" with a melody that "swerves all over the place. He also considered it "one of the most exciting (and most curiously funky)" of Big Star's songs. Deming also commented on Chilton having "fun with the lyrics", particularly highlighting the line "I can't get a license/To drive in my car/But I won't really need one/If I'm a big star." Music journalist John M. Borack described the song as "strange but hooky" and praised Chilton's guitar playing. Rolling Stone critic Ken Barnes described the song as "a foreboding, sprawling funk affair." The Sun critic Daniel Cotter described it as an "irresistible cut." The Commercial Appeal critic Walter Dawson considered it one of the "better cuts" on the album and particularly praised Jody Stephens' drumming. The Sacramento Bee critic Gene Sculatti said that it "reminds of Rick Derringer for its gritty funk."
