= In Space =

Studio album by Big Star
- Released: September 27, 2005
- Recorded: 2004
- Studio: Ardent Studios, Memphis, Tennessee
- Genre: Power pop
- Length: 39:04
- Label: Rykodisc
- Producer: Big Star, Jeff Powell

Big Star chronology
Columbia: Live at Missouri University 4/25/93 (1993)	In Space (2005)	Keep an Eye on the Sky (2009)

Professional ratings
Aggregate scores
Source	Rating
Metacritic	61/100
Review scores
Source	Rating
AllMusic	3/5 stars
Cokemachineglow	56%
The Guardian	2/5 stars
Pitchfork	5.3/10
PopMatters	7/10
Rolling Stone	3.5/5 stars
Stylus	B−
Under the Radar	7.5/10
The Village Voice	(dud)

In Space is the fourth and final studio album by American rock group Big Star, released in 2005. It was the first new Big Star studio album since Third/Sister Lovers, recorded in 1974 and released in 1978.

The album features original Big Star members Alex Chilton and Jody Stephens on guitar and drums respectively, with two more recent recruits, Jon Auer and Ken Stringfellow who play second guitar and bass. Auer and Stringfellow had been members of The Posies before joining Big Star in 1993 for sporadic live performances and tours. The four band members share lead vocal duty across the album's twelve tracks, with Chilton singing the majority.

== Composition and recording ==
In Space features new original material credited to all four members, alongside the occasional cowriter, along with two covers. According to Ken Stringfellow's recollections in the liner notes of the album's 2019 reissue, the album came about due to Chilton's reluctance to play much of Big Star's pre-existing back catalogue, preferring to record new material. The songs on the album are largely power-pop, along with the blues typical of Chilton's latter-day musical career, also incorporating influences from disco on "Love Revolution", and baroque on "Aria, Largo". The album, similarly to the band's prior three records, was recorded in Ardent Studios, being written in studio over a period of two weeks.

Opening track "Dony" is a power-pop song typical of the band's prior material, written in collaboration between Alex Chilton and Jon Auer, sung by Chilton, and incorporating a prominent saxophone solo. "Lady Sweet", the album's second track, was written and sung by Auer, and bears resemblance to the Chris Bell led songs of #1 Record, and features a lyrical quotation of a Britney Spears song in the pre-chorus. "Best Chance" and "February's Quiet" are the album's two Jody Stephens led songs, both composed in collaboration with Auer, and also bear some resemblance to Big Star's earlier material stylistically. Stephens also cowrote another two songs, "Southern Skies", written with Auer, and "Take Me", written with Stringfellow, which did not make the cut. Ken Stringfellow is lead vocalist and primary writer of the album's fourth track, "Turn My Back On The Sun", which musically references The Beach Boys, who Chilton had toured with during his time with The Box Tops. "Love Revolution" is a pastiche of disco music, featuring prominent saxophone and cornet parts, with saxophonist Jim Spake and cornet player Nokie Taylor taking cowriting credits. Opening the album's latter half is a cover of "Mine Exclusively", originally recorded by The Olympics in 1966, and previously recorded by Big Star in collaboration with Teenage Fanclub for inclusion on a flexi disc. The second cover is of Baroque composer Georg Muffat's "Aria, Largo", whose arrangement was scored by Chilton, and performed by the band. According to Stringfellow, Chilton took particular pride in his arrangement of the piece, being moved to tears upon listening back to it. "Hung Up With Summer" is another Chilton led number, one which bears some resemblance to his earlier Big Star songs, and became a regular part of the band's set until 2009. The song was cowritten with Bill Cunningham, a member of The Box Tops, and a songwriting collaborator of Chilton in his later years, together they also composed a number of originals for the Box Tops, all of which remain unheard following Chilton's 2009 death. Penultimate track "Do You Wanna Make It?", a Chilton led blues number, was the first recorded for the album, and typifies his approach to music production, as it utilises the first take of the song recorded by the band, despite small mistakes being present on the track.

Bonus tracks on the 2019 reissue include "Hot Thing," a Chilton led song which was originally recorded by the band in 1997 as its contribution to the tribute album Big Star, Small World, a project delayed by a succession of record label failures before its eventual release in 2006. Also included are sketches for two songs Jon Auer cowrote for the album, an acapella track of Stringfellow's "Turn My Back on the Sun", and a rough mix of Chilton and Auer's "Dony" featuring additional lyrics in place of the saxophone line.

== Track listing ==
All tracks are written by Jon Auer, Alex Chilton, Jody Stephens and Ken Stringfellow, unless otherwise noted.

In Space
No.	Title	Writer(s)	Lead vocals	Length
1.	"Dony"		Chilton	2:45
2.	"Lady Sweet"		Auer	3:40
3.	"Best Chance"		Stephens	3:04
4.	"Turn My Back on the Sun"		Stringfellow	2:38
5.	"Love Revolution"	Auer, Chilton, Jim Spake, Stephens, Stringfellow, Nokie Taylor	Chilton	5:49
6.	"February's Quiet"		Stephens	2:44
7.	"Mine Exclusively"	Shirley Mae Matthews	Chilton	2:31
8.	"A Whole New Thing"		Chilton	3:52
9.	"Aria, Lago"	Georg Muffat, arr. by Auer, Chilton, Stephens, Stringfellow	Instrumental	2:30
10.	"Hung Up with Summer"	Auer, Chilton, Bill Cunningham, Stephens, Stringfellow	Chilton	3:03
11.	"Do You Wanna Make It"		Chilton	2:46
12.	"Makeover"		Chilton	3:42

2019 CD reissue bonus tracks
No.	Title	Lead vocals	Length
13.	"Hot Thing"	Chilton	4:14
14.	"Dony (rough mix 4/17/04)"	Chilton	2:49
15.	"February's Quiet (Jody/Jon demo)"	Stephens	2:44
16.	"Lady Sweet (Jon Auer sketch #1)"	Instrumental	1:21
17.	"Lady Sweet (Jon Auer sketch #2)"	Auer	0:59
18.	"Turn My Back on the Sun (a capella)"	Stringfellow	2:31

== Personnel ==
Big Star

- Alex Chilton – vocals, guitar
- Jon Auer – vocals, guitar
- Ken Stringfellow – vocals, bass guitar, keyboards
- Jody Stephens – vocals, drums

with:

- Jim Spake – saxophone ("Dony", "Love Revolution", "Do You Wanna Make It" and "Makeover")
- Nokie Taylor – cornet ("Love Revolution")

Technical

- Jeff Powell – producer, mixing
- Adam Hill – assistant engineer
