= I'm in Love with a Girl =

Song by Big Star released in 1974

Single by Big Star

from the album Radio City
- A-side: "O My Soul"
- Released: 1974
- Recorded: 1973
- Genre: Power pop
- Length: 1:45
- Label: Ardent
- Songwriter: Alex Chilton
- Producers: John Fry and Big Star

"I'm in Love with a Girl" is a song written by Alex Chilton that was first released by Big Star as the last song on their 1974 album Radio City. It was also released along with another short song, "Morpho Too", as the B-side of the lead single from Radio City, "O My Soul".

== Composition ==
"I'm in Love with a Girl" is less than two minutes long. Chiton performed it alone, singing and playing an acoustic guitar. The Sun critic Daniel Cotter described it as a "gala swooning ballad." The Allmusic critic Bill Janovitz described the song as "a graceful country-folk ballad" with "a wistful melody" sung "over a sparse guitar strum".

The subject of the lyrics is a new love that took the singer by surprise. The Big Star biographer Bruce Eaton described the song as "Chilton's paeon to new love, conveying an innocence that belied the dark clouds that were already close on the horizon". He and the Chilton biographer Holly George-Warren noted that the "I'm in Love with a Girl" echoes the sentiment of an earlier Big Star song, "Thirteen", which also has a folk music-like melody and acoustic guitar.

== Reception ==
Janowitz considered the song to be "a stunning punctuation" to Radio City, with "lovely, simple and direct" melody and lyrics. Music journalist John M. Borack considered "I'm in Love with a Girl" and the short song that precedes it on Radio City, "Morpho Too", to be "perfect closers to the album." Borack described "I'm in Love with a Girl" as "casual" and "understated". George-Warren described the song as "seventy seconds of hope." Classic Rock History critic Brian Kachejian rated it as Big Star's 6th best song, saying that the opening instrumental sounds like the Byrds or Bob Dylan, but that Chilton's vocal phrasing may have influenced Nirvana's Kurt Cobain. SingersRoom critic Simon Robinson rated it Big Star's 4th best song, saying that "The song features a simple, stripped-down arrangement that puts the focus squarely on Chilton’s plaintive vocals and the tender, introspective lyrics. Robinson particularly praised the song's "emotional power and depth of feeling." A live version of "I'm in Love with a Girl" was released on Big Star's live album Live, recorded in 1974 and released in 1992.

== Personnel ==
- Alex Chilton - vocals, guitars
