= Columbia: Live at Missouri University =

Live album by Big Star
- Released: September 14, 1993
- Recorded: April 25, 1993
- Genre: Power pop; garage pop
- Length: 48:59
- Label: Zoo
- Producer: Jim Rondinelli

Big Star chronology
| Live (1992) | Columbia: Live at Missouri University (1993) | In Space (2005) |

Professional ratings
Review scores
| Source | Rating |
|---|---|
| AllMusic | 3.5/5 stars |
| Robert Christgau | A− |
| The Encyclopedia of Popular Music | 3/5 stars |
| Rolling Stone | 4/5 stars |
| Spin Alternative Record Guide | 4/10 |

Columbia: Live at Missouri University 4/25/93 is a reunion live album by the American power pop group Big Star, recorded and released in 1993 by the original Big Star members Alex Chilton and Jody Stephens together with The Posies' members Jonathan Auer and Ken Stringfellow. It was recorded at the University of Missouri in Columbia, Missouri.

In April 2016, the concert was reissued for Record Store Day as a 2-LP vinyl edition titled Complete Columbia: Live at University of Missouri 4/25/93, with an additional six tracks ("O My Soul," "Thirteen," "Kansas City," "Till the End of the Day," and "Duke of Earl," plus "Jody Rap" – Stephens reciting a thank you list to those who made the concert possible). The release, on 180-gram vinyl and pressed at MPO in France, was limited to 4,000 copies.

== Critical reception ==
Rolling Stone wrote: "Without trying to recreate pristine versions of the original songs, the rejuvenated Big Star go for feel: Guitars battle and build to crescendos, impassioned vocals push the melodic hooks with heart, soul and guts." Trouser Press wrote that "the under-rehearsed playing, if hardly airtight, is free of preciousness and nostalgia and vibrantly on the emotional money; the sloppy singing is hearty and tuneful." The Spin Alternative Record Guide dismissed the album, writing that the only song worth hearing is the cover of "Slut."

== Track listing ==
1. "In the Street" (Chris Bell, Alex Chilton) – 3:10
2. "Don't Lie to Me" (Bell, Chilton) – 3:22
3. "When My Baby's Beside Me" (Bell, Chilton) – 3:25
4. "I Am the Cosmos" (Bell) – 4:12
5. "The Ballad of El Goodo" (Bell, Chilton) – 4:28
6. "Back of a Car" (Bell, Chilton, Andy Hummel) – 2:53
7. "Way Out West" (Hummel) – 2:54
8. "Daisy Glaze" (Chilton, Hummel, Jody Stephens) – 3:34
9. "Baby Strange" (Marc Bolan) – 4:03
10. "For You" (Stephens) – 3:04
11. "Feel" (Bell, Chilton) – 3:34
12. "September Gurls" (Chilton) – 2:58
13. "Thank You Friends" (Chilton) – 3:19
14. "Slut" (Todd Rundgren) – 3:58

== Complete Columbia (2016 reissue) track listing ==
Side A

1. "In the Street" – 3:22
2. "Don't Lie to Me" – 3:15
3. "When My Baby's Beside Me" – 3:25
4. "I Am the Cosmos" – 4:11
5. "O My Soul" (Chilton) – 4:38

Side B

1. "The Ballad of El Goodo" – 4:33
2. "Back of a Car" – 2:54
3. "Way Out West" – 2:48
4. "Daisy Glaze" – 3:36
5. "Thirteen" (Bell, Chilton) – 2:51

Side C

1. "Baby Strange" – 4:05
2. "Jody Rap" – 0:46
3. "For You" – 3:04
4. "Feel" – 3:35
5. "September Gurls" – 3:00
6. "Thank You Friends" – 3:19

Side D

1. "Slut" – 3:58
2. "Jeepster" (Bolan) – 5:35
3. "Kansas City" (Jerry Leiber, Mike Stoller) – 3:05
4. "Till the End of the Day" (Ray Davies) – 3:37
5. "Duke of Earl" (Chandler, Edwards, Williams) – 3:35

== Personnel ==
Big Star

- Alex Chilton – lead vocals, guitar
- Jody Stephens – drums, lead vocals on "Way Out West" and "For You", backing vocals on "Slut"
- Jon Auer – guitar, backing vocals, lead vocals on "I Am the Cosmos" and "Back of a Car"
- Ken Stringfellow – bass guitar, backing vocals, lead vocals on "Daisy Glaze" and "Feel", co-lead vocals on "O My Soul"

Production

- Jim Rondinelli – producer, recording, mixing
- Timothy Powell – location chief engineer
- Dan Glomski – assistant engineer
- Lawrence Whipple – assistant engineer
- Jeff Powell – mixing assistant
- K. Lee Hammond – art direction
- Dorrie Cheng – design
- William Eggleston – photography
- Merlyn Rosenberg – photography

== See also ==
- University of Missouri School of Music
