= In the Street =

In the Street may refer to:

- In the Street (film), a 1948 film by Helen Levitt
- The 1983 release of the Village People's 1982 album Fox on the Box
- "In the Street" (song) by Big Star on #1 Record (1972)
