= Big Star, Small World =

Big Star Small World

Compilation album by various artists
- Released: 2006
- Recorded: 1997–1998
- Length: 39:03
- Label: Koch
- Producer: Jody Stephens

Professional ratings
Review scores
Source	Rating
AllMusic	3/5 stars

Big Star Small World is a 2006 tribute album to the American power pop band Big Star. It was produced by Big Star drummer Jody Stephens, who also created the cover art.

The album was originally intended for release in 1998 on Ignition Records, with contributions solicited from various artists starting in 1997. "Hot Thing," a new song by the reunited Big Star (Alex Chilton, Stephens, Jon Auer and Ken Stringfellow), was also slated for inclusion. However, after the label went under, the project was shelved. Eight years later, the album was finally released on Koch Records and featured all of the original artists' contributions. A vinyl edition was released on the eOne label in 2018 for Record Store Day Black Friday.

== Track listing ==
1. "Back of a Car" – Gin Blossoms 2:43
2. "Nighttime" – The Afghan Whigs 4:47
3. "The Ballad of El Goodo" – Matthew Sweet (with Mike Mills) 4:18
4. "Don't Lie to Me" – Juliana Hatfield 3:05
5. "You Get What You Deserve" – Idle Wilds 3:06
6. "Give Me Another Chance" – Whiskeytown 4:14
7. "When My Baby's Beside Me" – Kelly Willis 3:02
8. "Jesus Christ" – Teenage Fanclub 2:53
9. "What's Going Ahn" – The Posies 3:22
10. "Thirteen" – Wilco 3:25
11. "Hot Thing" – Big Star 4:12
