= You and Your Sister =

"I Am the Cosmos / You and Your Sister"
- Cover of the 1978 US single

Single by Chris Bell

from the album I Am the Cosmos
- A-side: "I Am the Cosmos"
- Released: 1978
- Genre: Folk rock; pop
- Length: 3:14
- Label: CAR; Rhino
- Songwriter(s): Chris Bell
- Producer(s): Chris Bell

"You and Your Sister" is a song by the American singer-songwriter Chris Bell, that appears on his only solo album I Am the Cosmos. It was released as the B-side to Bell's only single "I Am the Cosmos". Comparisons have been made to Big Star's "Thirteen", which Bell co-wrote with bandmate Alex Chilton, and is also an acoustic love ballad. Chilton sings backing vocals on the song.

Mark Deming of AllMusic described it as a "sweet, guileless love song" that "represents the sincerity and emotional innocence that Bell brought to his brief tenure in the band Big Star" that "make[s] more emotional sense than literal sense" and as "one of the great unknown love songs in the pop canon, a luminous and fragile ballad almost otherworldly in its beauty."

Two alternate versions of the song appear on the posthumous 1992 I Am the Cosmos release, an "acoustic version" and a "country version". The song is included in the 2009 Big Star box set Keep an Eye on the Sky.

== Other versions ==
"You and Your Sister" was covered, along with "I Am the Cosmos", by This Mortal Coil on the 1991 album Blood. The single was a No. 13 hit in the Netherlands. It has also been covered by Mike Daly on the 2001 album A Tribute to Big Star, by Seana Carmody on the 2007 album Barn Songs, by James Yorkston on The Cellardyke Recording and Wassailing Society in 2014, and by Susanna Hoffs on her 2021 covers album, Bright Lights.
