= Big Star: Nothing Can Hurt Me =

- Directed by: Drew DeNicola
- Written by: Drew DeNicola
- Distributed by: Magnolia Pictures
- Release dates: March 15, 2012 (South by Southwest); July 3, 2013 (United States)
- Running time: 113 minutes
- Country: United States
- Language: English

Big Star: Nothing Can Hurt Me is a 2012 documentary film about American rock band Big Star, directed by Drew DeNicola and Olivia Mori.

== Cast ==
- Jon Auer
- Chris Bell
- Alex Chilton
- Rick Clark
- Tav Falco
- Andy Hummel
- John Lightman
- Jody Stephens
- Ken Stringfellow

== Summary ==
The film chronicles the critical acclaim, lack of commercial success and the cult following of the band.

== Reception ==
On review aggregator Rotten Tomatoes, the film received a 92% approval rating, from 39 critics, with an average score of 7.1/10. The website's critics consensus reads: "Big Star: Nothing Can Hurt Me offers a persuasive argument for its subjects' cult classic oeuvre -- and presents a painfully passionate lament for their untapped potential." The Village Voice's Stephanie Zacharek praised director Drew DiNicola's documentary, writing that it "honors that sense of mystery, telling the band's story as if whispering it through the cracks in a wall. There's very little footage of the band themselves—their elusive magic found its truest expression in the studio rather than before a live audience."
