= In the Street (song) =

Song by Big Star released in 1972

Single by Big Star

from the album #1 Record
- A-side: "When My Baby's Beside Me"
- Released: August 1972
- Recorded: Summer–Fall 1971, Ardent Studios, Memphis
- Genre: Power pop
- Length: 2:53
- Label: Ardent
- Songwriters: Chris Bell; Alex Chilton
- Producer: John Fry

"In the Street" is a song by the American rock band Big Star. It was written by Chris Bell and Alex Chilton. The song was featured on their 1972 debut album #1 Record. The song was the B-side of their first single, "When My Baby's Beside Me." Lead vocals on "In the Street" were handled by Chris Bell. An altered cover version became the theme song of That '70s Show.

SingersRoom critic Simon Robinson rated it Big Star's 8th best song, praising the "catchy, upbeat melody that perfectly captures the sense of freedom and excitement that comes with youth and rebellion" and the "poetic and evocative" lyrics.

== Track listings and formats ==
- 7" vinyl
1. "In the Street" – 2:55
2. "When My Baby's Beside Me" – 3:20

== Personnel ==
- Chris Bell - vocals, rhythm guitars
- Alex Chilton - lead guitars, vocals
- Andy Hummel - bass guitar, vocals
- Jody Stephens - drums, percussion, vocals

== Cover versions ==
"In the Street" was recorded by Todd Griffin as "That '70s Song" with additional lyrics by Ben Vaughn as the theme song for the first season of That '70s Show. Another recording of "That '70s Song" by Cheap Trick was used as the theme in the later seasons and it was also performed by Brett Anderson in the sequel series That '90s Show. The Cheap Trick version was released on the That '70s Album soundtrack album and another version was released on their Authorized Greatest Hits compilation.
