= Radio City (album) =

Studio album by Big Star
- Released: February 20, 1974
- Recorded: Fall 1973
- Studios: Ardent Studios, Memphis
- Genre: Power pop
- Length: 36:14
- Label: Ardent
- Producers: John Fry; Big Star

Big Star chronology
| #1 Record (1972) | Radio City (1974) | Third/Sister Lovers (1978) |

Singles from Radio City
- 1. "O My Soul" / "Morpha Too" / "I'm in Love with a Girl" Released: April 1974; 2. "September Gurls" / "Mod Lang" Released: May 1974

Radio City is the second studio album by the American rock band Big Star. The album was recorded in late 1973 at Memphis' Ardent Studios and released on February 20, 1974, by Ardent Records. Though not a commercial success at the time, it is now recognized as a milestone album in the history of power pop music. Critically acclaimed upon its release, the record sold poorly, partly due to a lack of promotion and the distribution problems of the band's struggling record label. The album includes the songs "September Gurls" and "Back of a Car", which remain among the band's most recognizable. "O My Soul" and "September Gurls" were released as singles.

Radio City's reputation has grown since its release, with many critics and listeners considering it not only the definitive power pop album but one of the finest rock albums. As writer Richard Meltzer told an interviewer, "Big Star ... is the means through which most bands today who are influenced by the Beatles get their dose of the British Invasion." It was voted number 319 in the third edition of Colin Larkin's All Time Top 1000 Albums (2000). In 2003 and 2012, the album was ranked number 405 on Rolling Stone magazine's list of the 500 Greatest Albums of All Time", moved up to number 359 in the 2020 edition. Sound & Vision ranked it number 43 on its "Top 50 Albums of All Time" list.

The original Ardent Records LP featured record-jacket photographs by noted photographer William Eggleston, including The Red Ceiling on the cover. Eggleston was a close friend of band member Alex Chilton. Some of the outtakes from the album include "I Got Kinda Lost", "Gone with the Light", "Motel Blues", and "There Was a Life" (an early version of "There Was a Light" from Chris Bell's I Am the Cosmos solo album).

== Composition and recording ==
In late 1972, following the release of the debut album, #1 Record, founding member Chris Bell left the group and the band became inactive for four months. Bell had already contributed to the music and lyrics of "O My Soul" and "Back of a Car"—songs which Alex Chilton recalls were written "by committee"—but receives no official credit. Chilton, aided by drummer Richard Rosebrough and at times by bassist Danny Jones, completed the recording of "Mod Lang", "She's a Mover", and "What's Going Ahn" without Jody Stephens or Andy Hummel. After performing at the Rock Writers Convention in 1973, the band returned to the studio to start work on Radio City.

== Reception ==
Professional ratings
Review scores
| Source | Rating |
|---|---|
| AllMusic | 4.5/5 stars |
| Christgau's Record Guide | A |
| Classic Rock | 8/10 stars |
| Encyclopedia of Popular Music | 5/5 stars |
| Paste | 8.8/10 |
| Pitchfork | favorable |
| PopMatters | very favorable |
| Rolling Stone | favorable |
| Spin Alternative Record Guide | 10/10 |
| Stylus Magazine | favorable |

On its release in February 1974, Radio City met with general acclaim. Record World judged the musicianship "superb"; Billboard described the album as "a highly commercial set", and Cashbox called it "a collection of excellent material". However, sales were thwarted by an inability to make the album available in stores. Stax Records, primary distributor for the band's Ardent Records label, had recently placed distribution of its catalog in the hands of the much larger Columbia Records; Radio City's release coincided with a disagreement between Stax and Columbia, which left Columbia refusing to distribute the catalog. As a result, the album achieved only minimal sales of around 20,000 copies at the time.

Giving an "A" rating, Robert Christgau calls the album "Brilliant, addictive", observing meanwhile that "The harmonies sound like the lead sheets are upside down and backwards, the guitar solos sound like screwball readymade pastiches, and the lyrics sound like love is strange," concluding his review with, "Can an album be catchy and twisted at the same time?" AllMusic's William Ruhlmann considers that the band's follow-up to #1 Record "lacked something of the pop sweetness (especially the harmonies)" of the debut but captured "Alex Chilton's urgency (sometimes desperation) on songs that made his case as a genuine rock & roll eccentric. If #1 Record had a certain pop perfection that brought everything together, Radio City was the sound of everything falling apart, which proved at least as compelling."

== Track listing ==
Side one
| No. | Title | Writer(s) | Lead Vocals | Length |
|---|---|---|---|---|
| 1. | "O My Soul" (Mono) | Alex Chilton | Alex Chilton | 5:38 |
| 2. | "Life Is White" | Chilton, Andy Hummel | Chilton | 3:18 |
| 3. | "Way Out West" | Chilton, Hummel | Jody Stephens | 2:51 |
| 4. | "What’s Going Ahn" | Chilton, Hummel | Chilton | 2:42 |
| 5. | "You Get What You Deserve" | Chilton | Chilton | 3:08 |

Side Two
| No. | Title | Writer(s) | Lead vocals | Length |
|---|---|---|---|---|
| 1. | "Mod Lang" | Chilton, Richard Rosebrough | Chilton | 2:45 |
| 2. | "Back of a Car" | Chilton, Hummel | Chilton | 2:46 |
| 3. | "Daisy Glaze" | Chilton, Hummel, Jody Stephens | Chilton | 3:49 |
| 4. | "She’s a Mover" | Chilton | Chilton | 3:12 |
| 5. | "September Gurls" | Chilton | Chilton | 2:49 |
| 6. | "Morpha Too" | Chilton | Chilton | 1:27 |
| 7. | "I'm in Love with a Girl" | Chilton | Chilton | 1:48 |

== Personnel ==
Big Star

- Alex Chilton – vocals, guitars, keyboards
- Andy Hummel – vocals; bass guitar (ext. 4, 6, 9)
- Jody Stephens – vocals; drums (ext. 4, 6, 9)

Additional musicians

- Danny Jones – bass guitar (tracks 4, 6, 9)
- Richard Rosebrough – drums (tracks 4, 6, 9)

== Cover versions ==
- In 1981, the Searchers covered "September Gurls" on their album Love's Melodies, thus bringing full circle the influence that British Invasion bands had had on Big Star's sound.
- In 1986, The Bangles covered "September Gurls" on their album Different Light.
- The Gin Blossoms released a cover of "Back of a Car" on the 2002 deluxe edition of their album New Miserable Experience.
- In 2011, Chris Carrabba of Dashboard Confessional covered "I'm in Love with a Girl" on his album Covered in the Flood.
- In 2015, Lucero included "I'm in Love with a Girl" on their LP All a Man Should Do. Jody Stephens sang back up vocals and the title also comes from the song. Lucero recorded the album at Ardent studios with Jody Stephens frequently "popping in".
