= Hot Thing =

Hot Thing may refer to:

- "Hot Thing", a song by Prince from the album Sign o' the Times (1987)
- "Hot Thing", a single by Gaye Bykers on Acid (1989)
- "Hot Thing", a song by Big Star from the album Big Star, Small World (2006)
- "Hot Thing", a song by Talib Kweli from the album Eardrum (2007)
- "Hot Thing", a song by Usher included as a bonus track on the deluxe edition of the album Looking 4 Myself (2012)
