= September Gurls =

Song by Big Star released in 1974

Single by Big Star

from the album Radio City
- Released: August 1974
- Recorded: 1973
- Genre: Power pop; jangle pop; folk rock
- Length: 2:41
- Label: Ardent
- Songwriter: Alex Chilton
- Producers: John Fry; Big Star

Big Star singles chronology
"O My Soul" (1974)	"September Gurls" (1974)	"Kizza Me" (1978)

"September Gurls" is a song by the American rock band Big Star, written by frontman Alex Chilton and featured on their second studio album, Radio City, released in February 1974. It was also released as a single in August of that year. The song was covered by the Bangles in 1986, among other bands.

== Background ==
The song was named in tribute to the Beach Boys' "California Girls". It was inspired by three of the women in Chilton's life who he was thinking about at the time, including his ex-wife, having birthdays in September. According to Big Star bassist Andy Hummel, Chilton "was going through a lot of different girls that he was having relationships with, kind of simultaneously, and a lot of what's in those songs [including "September Gurls"] is him really just telling of his experiences with them and how he felt about them."

Producer John Fry recorded "September Gurls" on a six-track recording set. The instrumentation includes rhythm guitar, bass guitar and drums, with some guitar fills and a guitar solo on a mando-guitar.

== Reception ==
While "September Gurls" was never a big seller, it is considered a classic song by publications such as Rolling Stone and Allmusic, as well as by music journalist John M. Borack. Borack wrote:

"September Gurls" was and is the sine qua non of power pop, a glorious glittering jewel with every facet cut and shined to absolute perfection. While the Raspberries' "Go All the Way" provides a definitive encapsulation of what power pop is, "September Gurls" goes even further, not so much as the embodiment of a genre, but as a peerless, aching distillation of love and longing. "September Gurls" may not actually be the greatest song ever recorded, but for the duration of its 2:47 running time, you can be forgiven for believing it is.

The track was rated #180 by Rolling Stone in the magazine's top 500 songs of all time, and is described as a "power pop classic".

In his contemporary review of Radio City, Rolling Stone critic Ken Barnes described the song as "a virtually perfect pop number." In another contemporary review of Radio City, The Sun critic Daniel Cotter described it as an "irresistible cut." The Commercial Appeal critic Walter Dawson considered it one of the "better cuts" on the album and particularly praised Jody Stephens' drumming. The Sacramento Bee critic Gene Sculatti described it as being "achingly plaintive" and called it "the very essence of purest American pop, distilled of sentiments and riffs that could only have sprung from stateside music."

Jason Ankeny of Allmusic described the song as "sweetly gorgeous sound that's both familiar and novel; poignantly ragged and breathlessly reckless..." and says it "reveals a surprising tenderness, tempering its venom with achingly lovely vocals and sun-kissed harmonies".

Chilton biographer Holly George-Warren called the song a "pop masterpiece" and "a three minute burst of euphoric, chiming guitars, kicked off with the mando-guitar, accompanied by yearning vocals singing lyrics both heartfelt and snide: 'I love you, well, nevermind / I've been crying all the time.'"

Classic Rock History critic Brian Kachejian rated it as Big Star's best song, saying that "The song's swing and swaying groove sounds so good and stands as that perfect late summer or early fall song" and that "It’s one of those songs you can’t get out of your head." Novelist Michael Chabon called the song "the pocket history of power pop" and claims that it is "the greatest number-one song that never charted". Far Out rated it as the 89th most underrated song of the 1970s, saying that it "bristles with much of the same simultaneous melodic pleasantries and yet paradoxical cutting edge that the Fab Four propagated before them."

Chilton was less kind describing the song, saying:

The musical structure's fine, it's the lyrics that were the odd bit for me at that time. "September Gurls" may be one of the more coherent things that I managed to produce in that time but if I were more confident in writing lyrics I probably would have done something else. It's not a song that really grabs me to this day. The musical structure grabs me but the overall song doesn't.

== Covers ==
The Bangles released a cover of this song on their 1986 album Different Light. Kachejian called their version "great'. Other bands who have recorded the song include Superdrag and The Searchers.

== Personnel ==
- Alex Chilton - vocals, guitars
- Andy Hummel - bass guitar, vocals
- Jody Stephens - drums, vocals

== Tributes ==
The title of Katy Perry's 2010 number one hit "California Gurls" was spelled thus as a tribute to Chilton and Big Star. Perry's manager is a fan of the band, and asked her to spell "girls" with a "u".
