= I Am the Cosmos =

Studio album by Chris Bell
- Released: February 21, 1992
- Recorded: 1974–1975
- Studios: Studio Hérouville, Château d'Hérouville, France; Shoe, Memphis, Tennessee; Ardent, Memphis, Tennessee
- Genres: Pop, power pop
- Length: 53:30
- Label: Rykodisc
- Producer: Chris Bell

I Am the Cosmos is the only solo album by the American musician Chris Bell, posthumously released in 1992 by Rykodisc. It was produced by Bell and recorded in the 1970s. Bell had previously been a member of Big Star. Many of the songs reflected his embrace of Christianity.

In 2009, the album was remastered and re-released in a deluxe two-CD version by Rhino Handmade with alternate versions and additional tracks, and three songs by Bell's pre-Big Star groups, Icewater and Rock City. Some copies included a bonus 7" single of "I Am the Cosmos"/"You and Your Sister", a replica of the original single.

The booklet notes for the album were written by Bell's brother David, who also took the photographs used on the cover and in the CD booklet. The cover features a picture that was taken near Nendaz in Switzerland, it shows the opposite side of the valley with Ardon and the south flank of the snowy massif of Les Diablerets in the back.

The 2017 Omnivore Recordings edition comprises 35 tracks, including eight previously unreleased tracks and two that appear on CD for the first time. Three pre-Big Star tunes that appeared on the 2009 edition are omitted; these are now found on Omnivore's Looking Forward: The Roots of Big Star (also 2017).

== Critical reception ==
Professional ratings
Review scores
| Source | Rating |
|---|---|
| AllMusic | 4.5/5 stars |
| Robert Christgau | A− |
| Pitchfork | 7.9/10 |
| Rolling Stone | 4/5 stars |
| Spin | 9/10 |

Newsday wrote that "the playing on Bell's tracks is often hit or miss, the production erratic enough to qualify as something of a comfortable kids' vanity recording... But Bell clearly had talent, and just as clearly lacked the self-confidence to develop it." The Los Angeles Times concluded that "the singer-songwriter's obsession with the spirit of the Beatles seems so complete that he all but turns himself over completely to that spirit." The Orlando Sentinel deemed the album "lovely and terribly sad with a Badfinger-esque structure." Trouser Press likewise labeled it "a beautiful and disturbing Syd Barrett-by-way-of-Badfinger album of erratic, haunted pop music".

== Track listing ==
All songs written by Chris Bell.

=== Rykodisc CD, 1992 ===
1. "I Am the Cosmos" – 3:46
2. "Better Save Yourself" – 4:25
3. "Speed of Sound" – 5:11
4. "Get Away" – 3:26
5. "You and Your Sister" – 3:11
6. "Make a Scene" – 4:09
7. "Look Up" – 3:14
8. "I Got Kinda Lost" – 2:42
9. "There Was a Light" – 3:19
10. "Fight at the Table" – 3:41
11. "I Don't Know" – 3:22
12. "Though I Know She Lies" – 3:35

Bonus tracks

13. "I Am the Cosmos" (slow version) – 3:40
14. "You and Your Sister" (country version) – 2:56
15. "You and Your Sister" (acoustic version) – 2:53

=== Rhino Handmade 2CD, 2009 (bonus tracks) ===
13. "Looking Forward" – 3:39 by Icewater
14. "Sunshine" – 1:45 by Icewater
15. "My Life Is Right" – 3:08 by Rock City
16. "I Don't Know" (alternate version) – 4:18
17. "You and Your Sister" (alternate version) – 3:03
18. "I Am the Cosmos" (extended alternate version) – 5:07 (full length version of the above-mentioned "I Am the Cosmos" (slow version))
19. "Speed of Sound" (alternate version) – 5:13
20. "Fight at the Table" (alternate mix) – 4:11
21. "Make a Scene" (alternate mix) – 4:11
22. "Better Save Yourself" (alternate mix) – 4:29
23. "Get Away" (alternate version) – 4:21
24. "You and Your Sister" (acoustic version) – 3:00
25. "Stay with Me" – 2:49 with Keith Sykes
26. "In My Darkest Hour" – 3:01 with Nancy Bryan
27. "Clacton Rag" – 3:30

=== Omnivore 2CD, 2017 ===
Disc 1

1. "I Am the Cosmos" (Original Single Version)
2. "Better Save Yourself"
3. "Speed of Sound"
4. "Get Away"
5. "You and Your Sister" (Original Single Version)
6. "I Kinda Got Lost"
7. "Look Up"
8. "Make a Scene"
9. "There Was a Light"
10. "I Don’t Know"
11. "Fight at the Table"
12. "Though I Know She Lies"
13. "I Am the Cosmos" (Acoustic Mix) *
14. "You and Your Sister" (Acoustic Version)
15. "Look Up" (Acoustic Movie Mix) *
16. "Untitled Acoustic Instrumental" (Movie Mix)

Disc 2

1. "I Am the Cosmos" (Extended Alternate Version)
2. "Better Save Yourself" (Alternate Mix)
3. "Speed of Sound" (Alternate Version)
4. "Get Away" (Alternate Version)
5. "You and Your Sister" (Alternate Version)
6. "Make a Scene" (Alternate Mix)
7. "Fight At the Table" (Alternate Mix)
8. "I Don’t Know" (Alternate Version)
9. "Speed of Sound" (Alternate Version Backing Track) *
10. "Stay with Me" (with Keith Sykes)
11. "In My Darkest Hour" (with Nancy Bryan)
12. "So Long Baby (a.k.a. Clacton Rag)"
13. "Fight at the Table" (Outtake with Partial Vocal) *
14. "You and Your Sister" (“Country” Underdub Mix)
15. "Get Away" (Outtake Track) *
16. "Better Save Yourself" (Outtake Track) *
17. "I Am the Cosmos" (Alternate Backing Track with Piano) *
18. "Untitled Electric Instrumental" (Movie Mix) *
19. "Though I Know She Lies" (Movie Mix) *
- previously unreleased

== Personnel ==
[Details from the 2009 edition]

- Chris Bell – guitar, vocals
- Ken Woodley – bass guitar, organ
- Richard Rosebrough – drums
- Jody Stephens – drums
- Alex Chilton – backing vocals on track 5, guitar on track 26
- Bill Cunningham – arrangement on track 5
- Jim Dickinson – piano on track 10
- Original album recorded at Château d'Hérouville, France except:

Track 5 recorded at Ardent Studios, Memphis, Tennessee
Tracks 1, 8 & 11 recorded at Shoe Studios & Productions, Memphis, Tennessee, by Warren Wagner.

- Digital mastering – Dr. Toby Mountain at Northeastern Digital Recording, Inc., Southborough, Massachusetts
- NoNoise Processing on selected tracks by Scott Leviton at Fantasy Studios, Berkeley, California
- Package design – Steven Jurgensmeyer
- Photography and booklet notes – David Bell
