= There Was a Light =

2020 non-fiction book by Rich Tupica

There Was a Light: The Cosmic History of Chris Bell and the Rise of Big Star
- First edition (2018)
- Author: Rich Tupica
- Cover artist: David Bell photo, design by Nicole Rico
- Language: English
- Subject: Rock and roll
- Genre: Music
- Publisher: HoZac Books (2018); Post Hill Press
- Publication date: September 22, 2020
- Publication place: United States
- Pages: 469
- ISBN: 978-1682619285

There Was a Light: The Cosmic History of Chris Bell and the Rise of Big Star is a book by Rich Tupica, a Michigan-based journalist. It chronicles the life of Chris Bell and his band, Big Star, from his childhood in 1950s Memphis through his posthumous releases of 2017 and 2018. The book's narrative is told through verbatim quotes in an oral-history format.

In September 2020, the book was published as a traditional paperback and audiobook by Post Hill Press, which is distributed by Simon & Schuster. The first, limited-edition version of the book was published in December 2018 by HoZac Books.

== About the book ==
The 469-page book details the life of Chris Bell, best known as the founder of Big Star, a power pop band. The book weaves together memories from Bell's family, friends, bandmates, fans and associates.

The book, which has received favorable reviews, was released in conjunction with a series of album releases from Omnivore Recordings, including The Complete Chris Bell box set, and a series of other 2017 and 2018 Chris Bell and Big Star releases.

Aside from Bell's close friends, There Was a Light features memories and thoughts from notable Bell fans like Mike Mills of R.E.M., Chris Stamey and Mitch Easter of the dBs, Pete Yorn, Ivo Watts-Russell, Matthew Sweet and Rick Nielsen of Cheap Trick, among others.

== Reception ==
The Chicago Tribune gave the book a positive review, stating: "Chris Bell, who with Alex Chilton co-founded the ahead-of-its-time Memphis band Big Star, died 40 years ago, before his accomplishments as a singer, songwriter and musical visionary could be widely acknowledged. Rich Tupica sets the record straight in There Was a Light: The Cosmic History of Chris Bell and the Rise of Big Star."

Meanwhile, Under the Radar said: "Rich Tupica's There Was A Light is the holy grail of information on Big Star and the late Chris Bell. An oral history spanning 400 pages, There Was a Light is exhaustive in its detail and entrancing in its storytelling. It is everything the obsessive Chris Bell/Big Star fan could dream."

Memphis Flyer, a weekly publication that's covered Big Star's hometown legacy for years, said: "Tupica, a Michigan-based entertainment writer who's contributed to Record Collector, Uncut Magazine, and American Songwriter, has done his homework — and his legwork. Though he writes very little as an author, except a few explanatory notes to create the context, his five years of labor on this volume yielded interviews and archival quotes from dozens of people, requiring four pages to list them all at the end. The final product is an encyclopedic compendium of sorts, illuminating Bell's life from a thousand angles."
