= Third/Sister Lovers =

Third

Studio album by Big Star
- Released: March 18, 1978
- Recorded: Fall 1974
- Studios: Ardent, Memphis, Tennessee
- Genres: Power pop; alternative rock
- Length: 41:42 (1978 PVC release); 55:13 (1992 Rykodisc CD with bonus tracks)
- Label: PVC
- Producer: Jim Dickinson

Big Star chronology
Radio City (1974)	Third (1978)	Live (1992)

Alternative cover
- Cover of the 1992 Rykodisc reissue

Singles from Third
- 1. "Jesus Christ" / "Big Black Car" Released: 1978; 2. "Kizza Me" / "Dream Lover" Released: 1978

Third (reissued in 1985 as Third/Sister Lovers) is the third studio album by the American band Big Star. The sessions started at Ardent Studios in September 1974. Though Ardent created promotional, white-label test pressings for the record in 1975, a combination of financial issues, the uncommercial sound of the record, and lack of interest from singer Alex Chilton and drummer Jody Stephens in continuing the project prevented the album from ever being properly finished or released at the time of its recording. It was eventually released on March 18, 1978, by PVC Records.

After two commercially unsuccessful albums, Third documents the band's deterioration as well as the declining mental state of singer Alex Chilton. It has since gone on to become a cult album, and was placed at number 449 on Rolling Stone's 2012 list of the "500 Greatest Albums of All Time". Its reputation growing with time, the album moved up to number 285 on the magazine's 2020 listing. The album is included in Robert Dimery's book 1001 Albums You Must Hear Before You Die.

== Composition and recording ==
After the commercial failure of Big Star's first two albums, #1 Record (1972) and Radio City (1974), Alex Chilton and Jody Stephens returned to Ardent Studios in late 1974—accompanied by what biographer Bruce Eaton describes as "a large and revolving cast of Memphis musicians"—to record, under producer Jim Dickinson, "a batch of starkly personal, often experimental, and by turns beautiful and haunting songs that were anything but straight-up power pop." Ardent's John Fry, producer of the first two albums and also involved with the third, recalled that the sessions were burdened by severe personal issues; Eaton tells how Fry "finally called a halt to the escalating madness" and the album was mastered by Larry Nix on February 13, 1975.

Different opinions exist regarding the categorization of Third as a Big Star album. According to Chilton, "Jody and I were hanging together as a unit still but we didn't see it as a Big Star record. We never saw it as a Big Star record. That was a marketing decision when the record was sold in whatever year that was sold. And they didn't ask me anything about it and they never have asked me anything about it." Stephens said, "I've seen it in different ways. To a great extent it is an Alex solo record ... It's Alex's focus, it's his emotional state of being but I brought in the string section for the one song I wrote and Alex hit it off with Carl Marsh ... and started using Carl and the string section for other things. What would that album have been like if it didn't have the strings?" According to Eaton, the mastering card identifies Chilton as the recording artist.

Jovanovic, meanwhile, notes, "Whether the band was still called Big Star is debatable. The session sheets have the band name 'Sister Lovers' (Chilton and Stephens were dating Lesa and Holliday Aldridge at the time) clearly written on them. This may well have been a joke, although Chilton and Stephens did use the Sister Lovers name for a radio broadcast in early 1975." Lesa Aldridge, a cousin of photographer and Radio City album cover creator William Eggleston, contributed vocals and was, in the words of Dickinson, "a big, big part of the record". Dickinson said that Chilton, whose relationship with Aldridge was stormy, "reached a point ... where he started to go back and erase her—there was a lot more of Lesa on the album than there is now". During the sessions, Chilton recalled, "Jim and I did all sorts of weird things ... in off hours here and there".

Steve Cropper contributed guitar to a cover of The Velvet Underground's "Femme Fatale", while Eggleston played piano on a cover of eden ahbez's "Nature Boy".

== Release ==
In 1978 the tapes were acquired by the PVC label and given their first official release. Third was first released by Aura Records in London in 1978. The PVC release in the US came later that year. Numerous reissues by other labels on vinyl and CD would follow, often varying the title, running order, and cover art, as no 'definitive' version had ever been agreed upon by the band. In addition to the original songs, covers of The Kinks' "Till the End of the Day", eden ahbez's "Nature Boy" and Jerry Lee Lewis' "Whole Lotta Shakin' Goin' On" were variously included or omitted. The 1992 CD release on Rykodisc, assembled with Jim Dickinson's involvement, was regarded as the first attempt at a presentation of the original album concept devised by Dickinson and the band in 1974. In October 2016, Omnivore Recordings released Complete Third, a box set that includes every demo, rough mix, outtake, alternate take, and final master from the Third sessions ever known to exist.

== Reception ==
Professional ratings
Review scores
Source	Rating
AllMusic	5/5 stars
Christgau's Record Guide	A−
The Encyclopedia of Popular Music	4/5 stars
MusicHound Rock: The Essential Album Guide	3.5/5 stars
New Musical Express	10/10
Orlando Sentinel	3/5 stars
Rolling Stone	5/5 stars
Spin Alternative Record Guide	10/10

Like Big Star's first two albums, Third/Sister Lovers did not have commercial success at the time of its release but later attracted wider interest. Reviewing the 1992 reissue, Newsday wrote that "Chilton seems determined to undermine the songs with performances that range from incoherent to disengaged... It's the sound of a party that has turned sullen." The Los Angeles Times noted that "the tension and sense of individual struggle in the album fit comfortably in the tradition of much of the finest—and most liberating—rock." The Orlando Sentinel deemed the album "a stunning collection of eerie, anxious power pop, strikingly produced." The Chicago Tribune determined that Third/Sister Lovers "sounds like the soundtrack to a nervous breakdown, with Chilton's voice a fragile squeak, the rockers defined by raggedness and others tending to be slow, haunting and often beautiful."

In AllMusic's retrospective review of the album, the website gave it five stars out of five, calling it a "shambling wreck of an album" while at the same time "among the most harrowing experiences in pop music; impassioned, erratic, and stark" and "the slow, sinking sound of a band falling apart".

=== Accolades ===
In 1995, the album was ranked at No. 56 in the Spin Alternative Record Guide's list of the "Top 100 Alternative Albums". Third was ranked No. 1 in the Top 30 "Heartbreak Albums of All Time" by NME in 2000. The album also was featured in 2009 in David Keenan's article "The Best Albums Ever...Honest!" in the Scottish newspaper The Sunday Herald.

In 2012, the album was ranked 449th in Rolling Stone's list of the 500 greatest albums of all time, and moved up to No. 285 on a subsequently published list in 2020.

Third was listed at No. 31 on NME's "Darkest Albums Ever: 50 of the Best" in 2011.

=== Cover versions ===
"Kanga Roo" and "Holocaust" were both covered by This Mortal Coil on the band's debut LP, It'll End in Tears. The 1992 Rykodisc CD release of Third/Sister Lovers includes a "thank you" to This Mortal Coil in the liner notes in acknowledgment of this. In 1984, the Paisley Underground all-star group Rainy Day covered "Holocaust" on its eponymous album, featuring Kendra Smith of Dream Syndicate on lead vocals.

"Holocaust" was covered by alternative country band Son Volt on a 1999 promo EP, and is included on the band's 2005 compilation A Retrospective: 1995–2000. Placebo included its version of "Holocaust" on the "Slave to the Wage" single in 2000 and it can also be found on their compilation album Covers. "Take Care" was covered by Yo La Tengo on the 2003 album Summer Sun. "Kanga Roo" was included on Jeff Buckley's posthumous live album Mystery White Boy; another version can be found on the Legacy Edition of his album Grace and on The Grace EPs. In 2018, the Monkees included "Jesus Christ" on their first full-length holiday release, Christmas Party. R.E.M. covered "Jesus Christ" on their 2002 fan club Christmas single, as did The Decemberists on the various artists holiday album Holidays Rule Vol. 2 from 2017.

== Track listing ==
The album sessions have been issued in three vinyl and four CD formats featuring different song selections and/or running orders, plus as a comprehensive 3 CD set including demos and rough mixes.

=== Ardent Test Pressing, 1975 ===
Side A

1. "Stroke It Noel"
2. "Downs"
3. "Femme Fatale" (Lou Reed)
4. "Thank You Friends"
5. "Holocaust"
6. "Jesus Christ"
7. "Blue Moon"

Side B

1. "Kizza Me"
2. "Sometimes" [working title of "For You"]
3. "O, Dana"
4. "Nighttime"
5. "Whole Lotta Shakin' Going On" (Dave Williams)
6. "Kanga Roo"
7. "Take Care"

=== The Third Album ===
Aura Records UK LP, 1978

All songs written by Alex Chilton, except where noted.

Side A

1. "Kizza Me"
2. "You Can’t Have Me"
3. "Jesus Christ"
4. "Downs"
5. "Whole Lotta Shakin' Going On" (Dave Williams)
6. "Thank You Friends"

Side B

1. "O, Dana"
2. "Femme Fatale" (Lou Reed)
3. "Stroke It Noel"
4. "Holocaust"
5. "Nighttime"
6. "Kanga Roo"

This version removes "Sometimes" ("For You"), "Blue Moon," and "Take Care" from the test pressing and adds "You Can't Have Me."

Aura Records released two related 7" singles in 1978:

- "Kizza Me" / "Dream Lover" (AUS 103)
- "Jesus Christ" / "Big Black Car" (AUS 107)

The B-sides of these records brought the 1978 total of session songs released by Aura to 14. This was the only official release of "Dream Lover" until the 1985 CDs.

=== 3rd ===
PVC US LP, 1978 (reissued in 1985)

All songs written by Alex Chilton, except where noted.

Side A

1. "Stroke It Noel" – 2:04
2. "For You" (Jody Stephens) – 2:45
3. "Kizza Me" – 2:45
4. "You Can't Have Me" – 3:11
5. "Nightime" [sic] – 2:53
6. "Blue Moon" – 2:07
7. "Take Care" – 2:48

Side B

1. "Jesus Christ" – 2:38
2. "Femme Fatale" (Lou Reed) – 3:32
3. "O, Dana" – 2:35
4. "Big Black Car" – 3:37
5. "Holocaust" – 3:55
6. "Kanga Roo" – 3:47
7. "Thank You Friends" – 3:05

This version removes "Downs" and "Whole Lotta Shakin' Going On" from the test pressing and substitutes "You Can't Have Me" and "Big Black Car." This song selection was subsequently used for the non-bonus tracks (1 through 14) of the Rykodisc CD, though in a different sequence.

=== Big Star's 3rd: Sister Lovers, Sister Lovers: The Third Album and The Third Album/Sister Lovers ===
PVC CD (US), Castle/Dojo Communications CD/LP (UK), and Line Records CD (Germany), all 1987

These three CDs feature the same 17 tracks, but in entirely different running orders. This order is for the US edition; the numbers following are the track numbers on the UK and German editions. The first 12 tracks of the German edition follow the sequence of the 1978 UK LP.

1. "Jesus Christ" (6, 3)
2. "Femme Fatale" (3, 8)
3. "O Dana" (13, 7)
4. "Kizza Me" (11, 1)
5. "You Can't Have Me" (9, 2)
6. "Nighttime" (14, 11)
7. "Dream Lover" (8, 16)
8. "Blue Moon" (7, 15)
9. "Take Care" (17, 14)
10. "Stroke It Noel" (1, 9)
11. "For You" (12, 13)
12. "Downs" (2, 4)
13. "Whole Lotta Shakin' Going On" (15,5)
14. "Big Black Car" (10, 17)
15. "Holocaust" (5, 10)
16. "Kanga Roo" (16, 12)
17. "Thank You Friends" (4, 6)

These versions add "Dream Lover" to the 16 previously released songs. The US and UK running orders have no segues in common. The German edition shares "Kizza Me" / "You Can't Have Me" and "Downs" / "Whole Lotta Shakin' Going On" with the U.S. edition and "Blue Moon" / "Dream Lover" with the U.K.

=== Third/Sister Lovers ===
Rykodisc Edition, 1992 This version created by Jim Dickinson is alleged to reflect the band's original intentions for the album.

All songs written by Alex Chilton, except where noted.

1. "Kizza Me" – 2:44
2. "Thank You Friends" – 3:05
3. "Big Black Car" – 3:35
4. "Jesus Christ" – 2:37
5. "Femme Fatale" – 3:28 (Lou Reed)
6. "O, Dana" – 2:34
7. "Holocaust" – 3:47
8. "Kanga Roo" – 3:46
9. "Stroke It Noel" – 2:04
10. "For You" – 2:41 (Jody Stephens)
11. "You Can't Have Me" – 3:11
12. "Nightime" – 2:53
13. "Blue Moon" – 2:06
14. "Take Care" – 2:46
15. "Nature Boy" [bonus track] – 2:30 (eden ahbez)
16. "Till the End of the Day" [bonus track] – 2:13 (Ray Davies)
17. "Dream Lover" [bonus track] – 3:31
18. "Downs" [bonus track] – 1:43 (Chilton, Lesa Alderidge)
19. "Whole Lotta Shakin' Goin On" [bonus track] – 3:20 (Dave Williams)

=== Complete Third ===
Omnivore Recordings, 2016

Vol. 1: Demos To Sessions To Roughs

1. "Like St. Joan (Kanga Roo) (Demo)" *
2. "Lovely Day (Demo)"
3. "Downs (Demo)"
4. "Femme Fatale (Demo)"
5. "Thank You Friends (Demo)"
6. "Holocaust (Demo)"
7. "Jesus Christ (Demo)"
8. "Blue Moon (Demo)"
9. "Nightime (Demo)" *
10. "Take Care (Demo)"
11. "Big Black Car (Demo #2/Acoustic Take 1)"
12. "Don’t Worry Baby"
13. "I’m In Love with a Girl" *
14. "Big Black Car (Demo #3/Acoustic Take 2)"
15. "I’m So Tired" * – Alex & Lesa
16. "That’s All It Took" * – Alex & Lesa
17. "Pre-Downs" *
18. "Baby Strange" *
19. "Big Black Car (Demo #1/Band)"
20. "Kizza Me (Dickinson Rough Mix/Alex Guide Vocal)" *
21. "Till the End of the Day (Dickinson Rough Mix/Alex Guide Vocal, Kept as Final Vocal)" *
22. "Thank You Friends (Dickinson Rough Mix/Alex Guide Vocal)" *
23. "O, Dana (Dickinson Rough Mix)" *
24. "Dream Lover (Dickinson Rough Mix)" *

Vol. 2: Roughs To Mixes

1. "Big Black Car (Dickinson Rough Mix/Alex Guide Vocal)" *
2. "Whole Lotta Shakin’ Goin’ On (Dickinson Rough Mix)" *
3. "Take Care (Dickinson Rough Mix)" *
4. "Holocaust (Dickinson Rough Mix)" *
5. "Nightime (Dickinson Rough Mix)" *
6. "Thank You Friends (Dickinson Rough Mix)" *
7. "Nature Boy (Dickinson Rough Mix)" *
8. "After Hours" * – Lesa
9. "Stroke It Noel (Backwards Intro)"
10. "Lovely Day (Fry Rough Mix)" *
11. "Nightime (Fry Rough Mix)" *
12. "Blue Moon (Fry Rough Mix)" *
13. "Till The End Of The Day (Alternate Mix #1)"
14. "Big Black Car (Fry Rough Mix)"
15. "Holocaust (Fry Alternate/Rough Mix)"
16. "Downs (Fry Rough Mix)" *
17. "Kanga Roo (Fry Rough Mix)"
18. "Femme Fatale (Fry Rough Mix)" *
19. "For You (Alternate Version/Alex Vocal)" *
20. "Thank You Friends (Fry Rough Mix)" *
21. "Take Care (Alternate Version/Alex Vocal)" *
22. "Kizza Me (Fry Rough Mix)" *
23. "Till The End Of the Day (Fry Rough Mix #2)" – Lesa
24. "Nature Boy (Fry Rough Mix)"
25. "Mañana"

Vol. 3: Final Masters

1. "Stroke It Noel"
2. "Downs"
3. "Femme Fatale"
4. "Thank You Friends"
5. "Holocaust"
6. "Jesus Christ"
7. "Blue Moon"
8. "Kizza Me"
9. "For You"
10. "O, Dana"
11. "Nightime"
12. "Whole Lotta Shakin’ Goin’ On"
13. "Kanga Roo"
14. "Take Care"
15. "Big Black Car"
16. "Dream Lover"
17. "You Can’t Have Me"
18. "Till the End of the Day"
19. "Lovely Day"
20. "Nature Boy"
21. "Thank You Friends (New Remix – Vocals & Strings)" – hidden/unlisted track

*previously unreleased tracks

== Personnel ==
Big Star

- Alex Chilton – vocals, guitars, keyboards
- Jody Stephens – drums, vocals

Additional musicians

- Lesa Aldridge – vocals
- Tommy Hoehn – backing vocals
- Lee Baker – guitar
- Jim Dickinson – bass guitar, drums, Mellotron
- Steve Cropper – guitar
- Richard Rosebrough – drums
- William Murphey – bass guitar
- William Eggleston – piano on "Nature Boy"
- Tarp Tarrant – drums
- Jimmy Stephens – bass guitar
- Tommy Cathey – bass guitar
- Tommy McClure – bass guitar
- Carl Marsh – reeds, woodwinds, synthesizer, string arrangements

== Works cited ==
- Eaton, Bruce. Big Star's "Radio City" (33 1/3). Continuum International Publishing Group Ltd, 2009. ISBN 978-0-8264-2898-1.
- Jovanovic, Rob. Big Star: The Story of Rock's Forgotten Band. London: Fourth Estate, 2004. ISBN 0-00-714908-5.
