= Thirteen (song) =

1972 song by Big Star

- Label to the single with mislabeling as "Don't Lie to Me"

Single by Big Star

from the album #1 Record
- B-side: "Watch the Sunrise"
- Released: 1974
- Recorded: Late 1971
- Studio: Ardent, Memphis
- Genre: Folk; pop; jangle pop
- Length: 2:34
- Label: Ardent
- Songwriters: Alex Chilton; Chris Bell
- Producer: John Fry

Big Star singles chronology
"Don't Lie to Me" (1973)	"Thirteen" (1974)	"O My Soul" (1974)

"Thirteen" is a song by the American rock band Big Star. Rolling Stone describes it as "one of rock's most beautiful celebrations of adolescence", and rated it #396 on their list of the 500 greatest songs of all time. It was written by Alex Chilton and Chris Bell.

Bill Janovitz of Buffalo Tom writes in his AllMusic review of the song, "There are few songs that capture the aching innocence of adolescence as well" and calls it a "perfect melancholy ballad". The song encompasses folk and pop characteristics with its use of simple lyrics and the acoustic guitar.

Classic Rock History critic Brian Kachejian rated it as Big Star's second-best song, calling it "a gorgeous song" that "goes straight to the heart." Kachejian particularly praised the "beautiful harmonies" and felt that it influenced bands such as the Replacements.

The song was originally featured on the 1972 album #1 Record. It was released as a single by Big Star with “Watch the Sunrise” as the B-Side, on Ardent Records, but was mislabeled as “Don’t Lie to Me”.

"Thirteen" was featured in the season 3 finale, season 4 premiere, season 6 finale, and season 8 finale of That '70s Show. The song was covered by Grace VanderWaal and Graham Verchere in the 2020 movie Stargirl on Disney+ with a Grace Vanderwaal only performance appearing as a bonus on the soundtrack.

== Covers ==
"Thirteen" has been covered by several notable musicians. When asked if there was a Big Star cover he was especially fond of, lead singer Alex Chilton mentioned Garbage's version of this song.

== Personnel ==
Big Star:

- Alex Chilton - Lead vocals, Acoustic Guitar
- Chris Bell - Acoustic Guitar, Backing Vocals
- Andy Hummel - Bass Guitar, Backing Vocals
- Jody Stephens - Percussion, Backing Vocals

Technique:

- Big Star - Producer
- John Fry - Executive Producer
- J Powell - Mastering
