= Todd Griffin =

American singer-songwriter

Todd Griffin is an American musician and a former member of The Graveyard Train. He is pursuing a solo career and gained fame as the singer of the first version of the theme song to That '70s Show.

== Studio albums ==
- Trial by Fire (2003)
- Mountain Man (2015)

== Singles ==
- "Train Wreck" (2015)
- "God Save America" (2015)
- "Green Spot Road" (2015)
