= Number 1 Record =

#1 Record

Studio album by Big Star
- Released: April 24, 1972
- Recorded: May 1971 – February 1972
- Studios: Ardent Studios, Memphis
- Genres: Power pop; hard rock; folk rock; Southern rock
- Length: 37:03
- Label: Ardent
- Producer: John Fry

Big Star chronology
| #1 Record (1972) | Radio City (1974) |

Singles from #1 Record
- 1. "Thirteen" / "Watch the Sunrise" Released: March 1972; 2. "When My Baby's Beside Me" / "In the Street" Released: April 1972; 3. "Don't Lie to Me" / "Watch the Sunrise" Released: July 1972

#1 Record is the debut studio album by the American rock band Big Star. It was released on April 24, 1972, by Memphis-based Ardent Records.

Many critics praised the album's vocal harmonies and songcraft but #1 Record suffered from poor distribution and sold fewer than 10,000 copies upon its initial release. However, #1 Record gained wider attention in the late 1970s in the UK when EMI reissued it with Radio City as a double LP package due to increasing demand. The same combination was used when the album was released on CD in 1992. It is now widely-regarded as a seminal work in pop rock and power pop. In 2020 it was ranked number 474 on Rolling Stone magazine's list of the 500 greatest albums of all time. Rolling Stone also ranked the song "Thirteen" as number 406 on its 500 Greatest Songs of All Time. It was voted number 188 in the third edition of Colin Larkin's All Time Top 1000 Albums (2000).

== Composition and recording ==
Six years earlier, in 1966, when their hometown of Memphis, Tennessee, became a tour stop for The Beatles, primary songwriters Alex Chilton and Chris Bell were 15 years old. Heavily influenced by the UK band, the pair—Bell in particular—wanted to model their songwriting on the Lennon–McCartney partnership, with the result that they credited as many songs as possible on Big Star's debut album to "Bell/Chilton". In practice, they developed material incrementally in the studio, each making changes to the other's recordings. Drummer Jody Stephens recalled, "Alex would come in and put down something rough and edgy and Chris would come in and add some sweet-sounding background vocals to it." On Chris Bell's unique vocal contributions, Chilton said: "Chris and I did all the harmony vocals, and he had a brilliant mind that worked in a sort of contrapuntal way. It wasn't based so much on 'Oh you're singing the root. I should be singing the 3rd above,' he would just sing along with the line I was singing. He was a brilliant, instinctual maker of counterpoint."

The pair also contributed songs to the album that were individually composed before Big Star was formed. Chris Bell brought the songs "Feel", "My Life Is Right", and "Try Again" to the recording sessions, which he had previously recorded with a band called 'Rock City' (which featured Big Star drummer Jody Stephens and Steve Rhea), and Chilton brought "The Ballad of El Goodo" and the acoustic ballads "Thirteen" and "Watch the Sunrise". "The India Song" was written and composed by Andy Hummel.

#1 Record is the only Big Star album on which group founder Chris Bell is officially credited as a member. Bell had a major hand in the record through songwriting, vocals, guitar work, and the album's production. The polished sound of #1 Record, in contrast to the more raw styles of the band's subsequent albums, Radio City and Third/Sister Lovers, is attributed by producer John Fry to the presence of Bell: "When Chris Bell was still in the band, he took more interest than anybody in the production and technology end of things. He had a good production mind...the reason why the second album is rougher, with fewer harmonies, is due to the absence of Chris's influence in the studio." Bassist Andy Hummel would also credit Bell with having a hand in the album's production: "Chris was in charge. I would pretty well credit him with recording and producing that LP [#1 Record]. Of course, he had a lot of artistic help from Alex [Chilton] but Chris was the technical brains behind it. He was the only one of us at that time who knew how to record." Alex Chilton would also acknowledge Bell's heavy role in the studio production: "Chris was really into recording. He didn't want the rest of us fooling around in the studio, that was his business." Chilton would also give producer John Fry credit for achieving the album's high level of production quality: "John Fry was a genius in his way of mixdowns. We didn't put things on tape much differently than was the standard method of doing things, but he just had such finesse and great ears, and he was just a great meticulous mixdown engineer and producer. [...] He's the one responsible for making those records sound so fucking great." In 2014 the album was re-released through Stax Records with liner notes by Mike Mills.

== Reception and legacy ==
Professional ratings
Review scores
| Source | Rating |
|---|---|
| AllMusic | 5/5 stars |
| Christgau's Record Guide | B+ |
| Classic Rock | 8/10 stars |
| Encyclopedia of Popular Music | 5/5 stars |
| Rolling Stone | favorable |
| Spin Alternative Record Guide | 8/10 |

On its release in August 1972, #1 Record immediately received widespread acclaim, and continued to do so for six months, although the inability by Stax Records to make the album available in stores meant it sold fewer than 10,000 copies upon its initial release. Record World called it "one of the best albums of the year", and Billboard commented, "Every cut could be a single". Cashbox described it as one where "everything falls together as a total sound" and one that "should go to the top". The River City Review's reaction to the album was to state that "Big Star will be around for many moons".

The album's reputation and influence have continued since then. As William Ruhlmann wrote in AllMusic, "The problem with coming in late on an artwork lauded as 'influential' is that you've probably encountered the work it influenced first, so its truly innovative qualities are lost. Thus, if you are hearing Big Star's debut album for the first time decades after its release (as, inevitably, most people must), you may be reminded of Tom Petty & the Heartbreakers or R.E.M., who came after—that is, if you don't think of The Byrds and The Beatles circa 1965. What was remarkable about #1 Record in 1972 was that nobody except Big Star (and maybe Badfinger and The Raspberries) wanted to sound like this—simple, light pop with sweet harmonies and jangly guitars."

== Track listing ==
All tracks are written by Chris Bell and Alex Chilton, except where noted.

Side one
| No. | Title | Writer(s) | Lead vocals | Length |
|---|---|---|---|---|
| 1. | "Feel" | | Bell | 3:34 |
| 2. | "The Ballad of El Goodo" | | Chilton | 4:21 |
| 3. | "In the Street" | | Bell | 2:55 |
| 4. | "Thirteen" | | Chilton | 2:34 |
| 5. | "Don't Lie to Me" | | Bell | 3:07 |
| 6. | "The India Song" | Andy Hummel | Hummel | 2:20 |
| Total length: | | | | 18:51 |

Side two
| No. | Title | Writer(s) | Lead vocals | Length |
|---|---|---|---|---|
| 1. | "When My Baby's Beside Me" | | Chilton | 3:22 |
| 2. | "My Life Is Right" | Bell, Chilton, Tom Eubanks | Bell | 3:07 |
| 3. | "Give Me Another Chance" | | Chilton | 3:26 |
| 4. | "Try Again" | | Bell | 3:31 |
| 5. | "Watch the Sunrise" | | Chilton | 3:45 |
| 6. | "ST 100/6" | | Bell | 1:01 |
| Total length: | | | | 18:12 |

== Personnel ==
Big Star

- Chris Bell – guitar, vocals
- Alex Chilton – guitar, vocals
- Andy Hummel – bass guitar, piano, vocals
- Jody Stephens – drums, percussion, vocals

Guest

- Terry Manning – electric piano, harmony vocals
