= John M. Borack =

American music critic

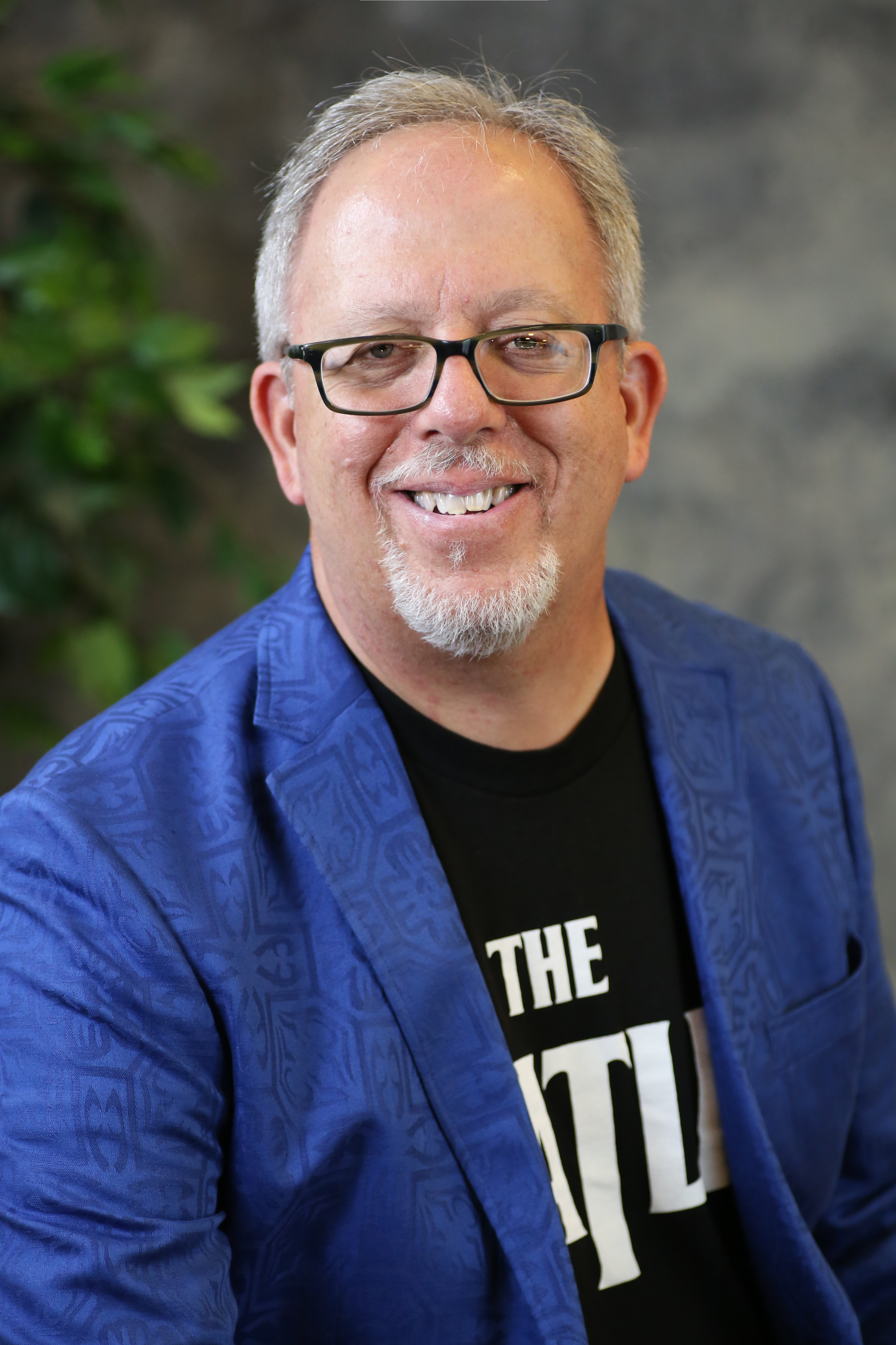
John M. Borack

John M. Borack is a music journalist and musician from Southern California.

== Journalist ==
Borack's music reviews, columns and feature articles have appeared in periodicals such as Goldmine, Amplifier, Trouser Press, The Garden Grove Journal, Audities and Popsided. He first began contributing to Goldmine in 1985 and as of 2010 continued to write the "Rave On" column for the magazine. He currently writes the "Power Pop Plus" column for Goldmine.

Borack is the author of the 2007 book Shake Some Action: The Ultimate Power Pop Guide. He credits the Beatles with helping to shape his appreciation for music and in 2010 published the book John Lennon: Life Is What Happens.

In his biography for AllMusic, he describes himself as a "power-pop maniac". Among his contributions as a CD liner-note writer, he supplied the liner notes for the 1997 Rhino Records compilation Poptopia! Power Pop Classics of the '80's.

In late 2021, his latest compilation project, titled We All Shine On: A Tribute to the Music of 1970 was released through SpyderPop Records.
