= Rykodisc =

American record label

- Parent company: Warner Music Group
- Founded: January 1984
- Founder: Arthur Mann, Rob Simonds, Doug Lexa, Don Rose
- Distributor: Rhino Entertainment
- Genre: Pop, rock
- Country of origin: U.S.
- Official website: rhino.com

Rykodisc is an American record label owned by Warner Music Group, operating as a unit of WMG's Independent Label Group and distributed through Alternative Distribution Alliance.

== History ==
Claiming to be the first CD-only independent record label in the United States, Rykodisc was founded in January 1984 in Cannes, France, by Arthur Mann, Rob Simonds, Doug Lexa and Don Rose. The name "Ryko," which the label claimed was a Japanese word meaning "sound from a flash of light," was chosen to reflect the company's CD-only policy. In the late 1980s, however, the label also began to issue high-quality cassette and vinyl versions of many releases under the name Ryko Analogue. From 1992 to 1993, they also released 7 titles on the MiniDisc format.

Initially founded as an audiophile-oriented label, Rykodisc shifted its focus towards mainstream audiences following the worldwide success of Dire Straits' 1985 album Brothers in Arms, which demonstrated that the compact disc's growth would be significantly faster than initially anticipated. The label subsequently saw notable successes in the CD reissue industry, as artists such as Elvis Costello, David Bowie, Yoko Ono, Frank Zappa, the estate of Nick Drake, Nine Inch Nails, Sugar, Robert Wyatt, and Mission of Burma allowed Rykodisc to issue their catalogs on CD. Rykodisc also re-released the SST Records-era recordings by the Meat Puppets. It also was responsible for the first release of the "I Am the Cosmos" LP by the late Chris Bell of Big Star, another band on the label.

Artwork designed by Conrad Warre for the inside of Rykodisc CD reissues (1993–1994); bottle green transparent jewel cases designed and developed by Warre with Philips Dupont Optical

Over the years, the label acquired Hannibal Records, Tradition Records, Gramavision (founded by Jonathan F. P. Rose), Emperor Norton Records, Restless Records and Cordless Recordings. Rykodisc also founded a distribution company, Ryko Distribution, and a music publishing company, Rykomusic. The label's catalog exceeds 1,200 titles.

In 1998, Chris Blackwell left Island Records and bought Rykodisc for a reported $35 million as a means of acquiring music marketing and distribution expertise for his new venture, a media company called Palm Pictures. In 1999, one year after the Blackwell buy-out, the office in Salem, Massachusetts, was closed, and many industry veterans were laid off. In 2001, Blackwell parted ways with Rykodisc. The label was then located in New York City with offices in Los Angeles and in Beverly, Massachusetts.

On March 23, 2006, it was announced that Warner Music Group acquired the Ryko Corporation for $67.5 million. The Zappa Family Trust and Ryko parted ways in 2012 with the Zappa Family Trust reacquiring Frank Zappa's recorded music catalogue and Universal Music Enterprises taking over distribution of the Zappa catalogue. Also in 2006, the independent publishing company Evergreen Copyrights purchased the Rykomusic publishing catalogue, among others. In September 2010, Evergreen was acquired by BMG Rights Management.

In 2009, Ryko Distribution was folded into Alternative Distribution Alliance.

== See also ==
- List of record labels
