= Big Star =

American rock band

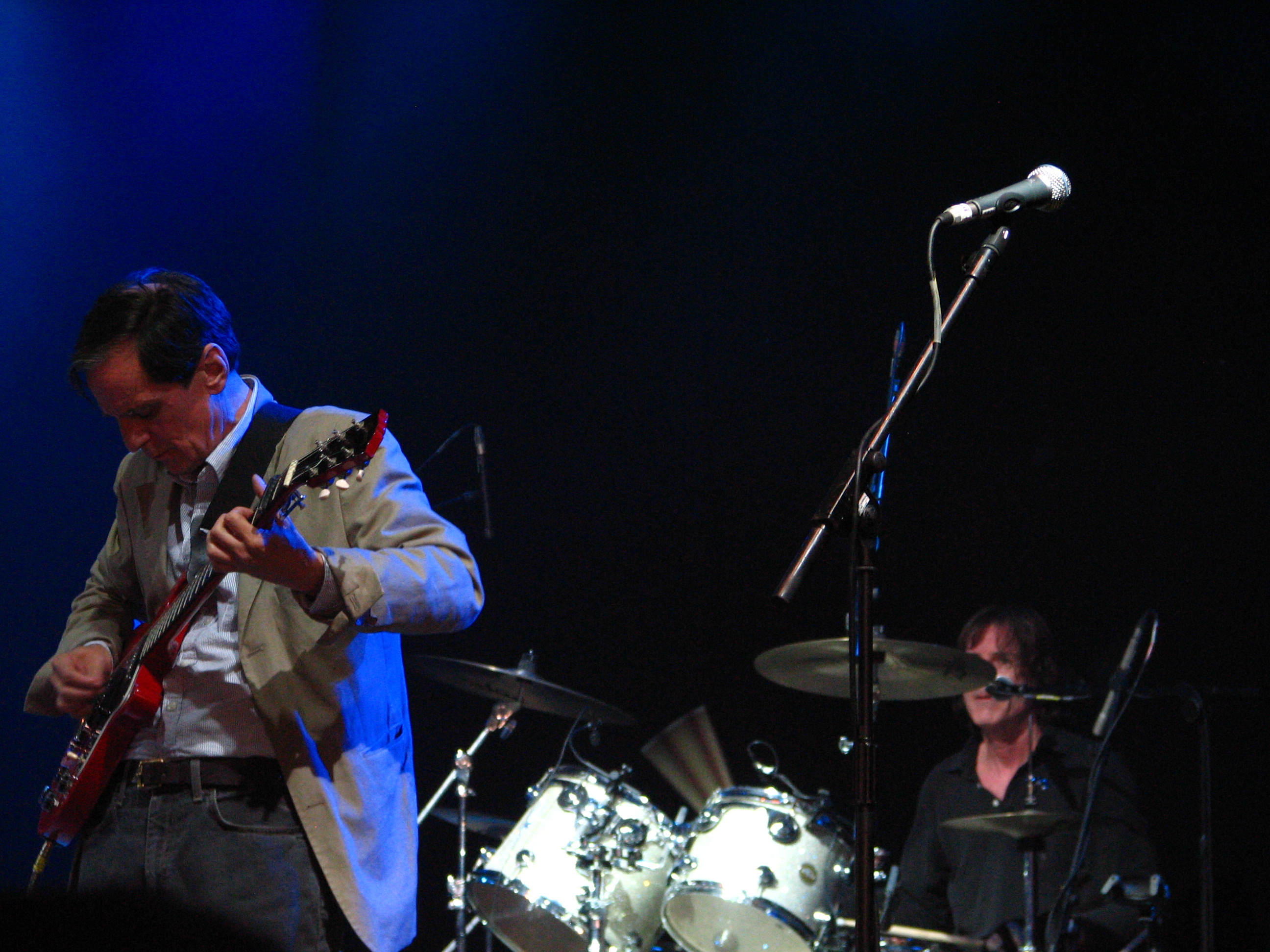
- Alex Chilton (left) and Jody Stephens (right) performing in Hyde Park, London, England in 2009

Background information
- Origin: Memphis, Tennessee, U.S.
- Genres: Power pop; garage pop; jangle pop; proto-alternative
- Years active: 1971–1975; 1993–2010
- Labels: Ardent/Stax; Rykodisc
- Past members: Alex Chilton; Jody Stephens; Andy Hummel; Chris Bell; John Lightman; Jon Auer; Ken Stringfellow

Big Star was an American rock band formed in Memphis, Tennessee in 1971 by Alex Chilton (vocals, guitar), Chris Bell (vocals, guitar), Jody Stephens (drums), and Andy Hummel (bass). They have been described as the "quintessential American power pop band", and "one of the most mythic and influential cult acts in all of rock & roll". In its first era, the band's musical style drew influence from 1960s acts such as the Beatles and the Byrds, pioneering a style that foreshadowed the alternative rock of the 1980s and 1990s. Before they broke up, Big Star created a "seminal body of work that never stopped inspiring succeeding generations" according to Rolling Stone. Three of Big Star's studio albums are included in Rolling Stone's lists of the "500 Greatest Albums of All Time".

Big Star's debut album, 1972's #1 Record, was met with enthusiastic reviews, but ineffective marketing by Stax Records and limited distribution stunted its commercial success. Frustration took its toll on band relations: Bell left not long after the first record's commercial progress stalled, and Hummel left to finish his college education after a second album, Radio City, was completed in December 1973. Like #1 Record, Radio City received critical acclaim upon release, but label issues again thwarted sales—Columbia Records, which had assumed control of the Stax catalog, likewise effectively vetoed its distribution.

After a third album, recorded in the fall of 1974, was deemed commercially unviable and shelved before receiving a title, the band broke up late in 1974. Four years later, the first two Big Star LPs were released together in the UK as a double album. The band's third album was finally issued soon afterward; titled Third/Sister Lovers, it found limited commercial success, but has since become a cult classic. Shortly thereafter, Chris Bell was killed in a car accident at the age of 27. During the group's hiatus in the 1980s, the Big Star discography drew renewed attention when R.E.M. and the Replacements, as well as other popular bands, cited the group as an influence. In 1992, interest was further stimulated by Rykodisc's reissues of the band's albums, complemented by a collection of Bell's solo work.

In 1993, Chilton and Stephens reformed Big Star with recruits Jon Auer and Ken Stringfellow of the Posies, and played a concert at the University of Missouri. The band remained active, performing tours in Europe and Japan, and released a new studio album, In Space, in 2005. Chilton died in March 2010 after suffering from heart problems, with Hummel dying of cancer four months later. These deaths left Stephens as the sole surviving founding member. Since December 2010, several surviving members have appeared in a series of live tribute performances of the album Third/Sister Lovers, under the billing "Big Star's Third". As of 2017, that project has remained active.

== First era: 1971–1974 ==
=== Formation of the band ===
From 1967 to 1970, Chilton was the lead singer for the blue-eyed soul group the Box Tops, who scored a No. 1 hit with the song "The Letter" when he was 16. After leaving the group, he recorded a solo studio album. He was offered the role of lead vocalist for Blood, Sweat & Tears, but turned down the offer as "too commercial". Chilton had known Chris Bell for some time: both lived in Memphis, each had spent time recording music at Ardent Studios, and each, when aged 13, had been impressed by the music of the Beatles during the band's 1964 debut U.S. tour. A song Chilton wrote nearly six years after he first witnessed a Beatles performance, "Thirteen", referred to the event with the line "rock 'n' roll is here to stay".

Chilton asked Bell to work with him as a duo modeled on Simon & Garfunkel; Bell declined, but invited Chilton to a performance by his own band, Icewater, composed of Bell, drummer Jody Stephens, and bassist Andy Hummel. Attracted by Icewater's music, Chilton showed the three his new song "Watch the Sunrise", and was asked to join the band. Both "Watch the Sunrise" and "Thirteen" were subsequently included on Big Star's first album, #1 Record.

The now four-piece band adopted the name Big Star when one member was given the idea from a grocery store often visited for snacks during recording sessions. One of many Big Star Markets outlets in the Memphis region at the time, it had a logo consisting of a five-pointed star enclosing the words "Big Star"; as well as the store's name, the band used its logo but without the word "Star" to avoid infringing copyright.

=== #1 Record ===
Although all four members contributed to songwriting and vocals on the first album, Chilton and Bell dominated as a duo intentionally modeled on John Lennon and Paul McCartney. The album was recorded by Ardent founder John Fry, with Terry Manning contributing occasional backing vocals and keyboards. The title #1 Record was decided towards the end of the recording sessions and evinced, albeit as a playful hope rather than a serious expectation, the chart position to be achieved by a big star. Although Fry—at the band's insistence—was credited as "executive producer", publicly he insisted that "the band themselves really produced these records". Fry recalled how Ardent, one of the first recording studios to use a sixteen-track tape machine, worked experimentally with the band members: "We started recording the songs with the intent that if it turned out OK we'd put it out [...] I wound up being the one that primarily worked on it: I recorded all the tracks and then they would often come late at night and do overdubs. One by one, they all learned enough engineering."

"The Ballad of El Goodo"
Sample of "The Ballad of El Goodo" from #1 Record (1972). The song is an example of a "luminous, melancholy ballad", contrasting with the rock and power pop in Radio City.

Describing the mix of musical styles present on #1 Record, Rolling Stone's Bud Scoppa notes that the album includes "reflective and acoustic" numbers, saying that "even the prettiest tunes have tension and subtle energy to them, and the rockers reverberate with power". Scoppa finds that in each mode, "the guitar sound is sharp-edged and full". #1 Record was released in June 1972, and quickly received strong reviews. Billboard went as far as to say, "Every cut could be a single". Rolling Stone judged the album "exceptionally good", while Cashbox stated, "This album is one of those red-letter days when everything falls together as a total sound", and called it "an important record that should go to the top with proper handling".

Proper handling, however, was not forthcoming: Stax Records proved unable to either promote or distribute the record with any degree of success, and even when the band's own efforts to get airplay generated interest, fans were unable to buy it as Stax could not make it available in many stores. Stax, in an effort to improve its catalog's availability, signed a deal with Columbia Records, already successful distributors in the U.S., making Columbia responsible for the entire Stax catalog. But Columbia had no interest in dealing with the independent distributors previously used by Stax and removed even the existing copies of #1 Record from the stores.

=== Radio City ===
The frustration at #1 Record's obstructed sales contributed to tension within the band. There was physical fighting between members: Bell, after being punched in the face by Hummel, retaliated by smashing Hummel's new bass guitar to pieces against the wall. Hummel took revenge at a later date: finding Bell's acoustic guitar in the latter's unattended car, he repeatedly punched it with a screwdriver. In November 1972, Bell quit the band. When work continued on songs for a second album, Bell rejoined, but further conflict soon erupted. A master tape of the new songs inexplicably went missing, and Bell, whose heavy drug intake was affecting his judgment, attacked Fry's parked car. In late 1972, struggling with severe depression, Bell quit the band once more, and by the end of the year Big Star disbanded.

"September Gurls"
Sample of "September Gurls" from Radio City (1974). Like #1 Record, the album contains a mix of rock, power pop, and acoustic reflection, but is more pop-oriented than either #1 Record or Third. This song is an example of the band's most highly acclaimed power pop.

After a few months Chilton, Stephens, and Hummel decided to reform Big Star, and the three resumed work on the second album. The title chosen, Radio City, continued the play on the theme of a big star's popularity and success, expressing what biographer Robert Gordon calls the band's "romantic expectation". As Hummel put it:

This was probably pretty lame, but in those days putting any word in front of the noun "city" to sort of emphasize the totality and pervasiveness of it was just a way of talking people had. If someone suggested going to a store but you had gotten a bad deal there you might say, "Oh no, that place is 'rip off city'." Calling an LP Radio City would be kind of wishful thinking. I mean we hoped it would be played on the radio a lot, making it "radio city". Of course it didn't pan out that way...

Stephens recalled: "Radio City, for me, was just an amazing record. Being a three-piece really opened things up for me in terms of playing drums. Drums take on a different role in a three-piece band, so it was a lot of fun. [...] Radio City was really more spontaneous, and the performances were pretty close to live performances."

Although uncredited, Bell contributed to the writing of some of the album's songs, including "O My Soul" and "Back of a Car". Shortly before the album's release, Hummel left the band: judging that it would not last, and in his final year at college, he elected to concentrate on his studies and live a more normal life. He was replaced by John Lightman for a short tenure prior to the band dissolving.

Rolling Stone's Ken Barnes, describing the musical style of Radio City, opens by noting as a backdrop that the band's debut, #1 Record, established them as "one of the leading new American bands working in the mid-Sixties pop and rock vein". Radio City, Barnes finds, has "plenty of shimmering pop delights", although "the opening tune, 'O My Soul,' is a foreboding, sprawling funk affair"; Barnes concludes that "Sometimes they sound like the Byrds, sometimes like the early Who, but usually like their own indescribable selves".

Radio City was released in February 1974 and, like #1 Record, received excellent reviews. Record reported, "The sound is stimulating, the musicianship superb, and the result is tight and rollickingly rhythmic." Billboard judged it "a highly commercial set". Rolling Stone's Bud Scoppa, then with Phonograph Record, affirmed, "Alex Chilton has now emerged as a major talent, and he'll be heard from again". Cashbox called it "a collection of excellent material that hopefully will break this deserving band in a big way". But just as #1 Record had fallen victim to poor marketing, so too did Radio City. Columbia, now in complete control of the Stax catalog, refused to process it following a disagreement. Without a distributor, sales of Radio City, though far greater than those of #1 Record, were minimal at only around 20,000 copies.

=== Third/Sister Lovers ===
In September 1974, eight months after the release of Radio City, Chilton and Stephens returned to Ardent Studios to work on a third album. They were assisted by producer Jim Dickinson and an assortment of musicians (including drummer Richard Rosebrough) and Lesa Aldridge, Chilton's girlfriend, who contributed on vocals. The sessions and mixing were completed in early 1975, and 250 copies of the album were pressed with plain labels for promotional use.

Parke Putterbaugh of Rolling Stone described Third/Sister Lovers as "extraordinary". It is, he wrote, "Chilton's untidy masterpiece. [...] beautiful and disturbing"; "vehemently original"; of "haunting brilliance":

To listen to it is to be "plunged into a maelstrom of conflicting emotions. Songs are drenched in strings and sweet sentiment one minute, starkly played and downcast the next. No pop song has ever bottomed out more than "Holocaust", an anguished plaint sung at a snail's pace over discordant slide-guitar fragments and moaning cello [...] On the up side, there's the delicious pop minuet "Stroke It Noel", the anticipatory magic of "Nightime" ("Caught a glance in your eyes and fell through the skies," Chilton rhapsodizes) [...] Big Star's baroque, guitar-driven pop reaches its apotheosis on songs like "Kizza Me", "Thank You Friends" and "O, Dana". [...] Without question, Third is one of the most idiosyncratic, deeply felt and fully realized albums in the pop idiom.

"Holocaust"
Sample of "Holocaust" from Third/Sister Lovers (recorded 1974; released 1978). Third is quite unlike Big Star's first two albums, and "Holocaust" is an example of its slower, darker songs; "Alex Chilton at his haunting best".

"Thank You Friends"
Sample of "Thank You Friends" from Third/Sister Lovers (recorded 1974; released 1978). Although containing a number of slow, dark songs, the album also contains material with "the undeniable hooks of the earlier albums", which this song exemplifies.

Fry and Dickinson flew to New York with promotional copies and met employees of a number of record labels, but could not generate interest in the album. When a similar promotion attempt failed in California, the album was shelved as it was considered not commercial enough for release. Fry recalled, "We'd go in and play it and these guys would look at us like we were crazy". In late 1974, before the album was even named, the band broke up, bringing Big Star's first era to its end. Dickinson later said that he was "nailed for indulging Alex on Big Star Third, but I think it is important that the artist is enabled to perform with integrity. What I did for Alex was literally remove the yoke of oppressive production that he had been under since the first time he ever uttered a word into a microphone, for good or ill."

Since quitting the band in 1972, Bell had spent time in several different countries trying to develop his solo career. In 1978, after his return to Memphis, the first two Big Star albums were released together in the U.K. as a double album, drawing enthusiastic reviews and interest from fans. Soon afterward, Big Star's recognition grew further when, four years after its completion, the third album too was released in both the U.S. and the U.K. By now, the hitherto untitled Third/Sister Lovers had become known by several unofficial names, including Third (reflecting its position in the discography), Beale Street Green (acknowledging the legendary site nearby, once a focal point for Memphis blues musicians), and Sister Lovers (because during the album's recording sessions, Chilton and Stephens were dating sisters Lesa and Holliday Aldridge).

Not long after the release of Third/Sister Lovers, Bell died in a car accident. He apparently lost control of his car while driving alone and was killed when he struck a lamp post after hitting the curb a hundred feet before. A blood test found that he was not drunk at the time, and no drugs were found on him other than a bottle of vitamins. Bell is believed to have either fallen asleep at the wheel or become distracted.

== Second era: 1993–2010 ==
Big Star reformed in 1993 with a new lineup when guitarist Jon Auer and bassist Ken Stringfellow joined Chilton and Stephens. Auer and Stringfellow remained members of the Posies, founded by the pair in 1986. Stringfellow was also known for his work with R.E.M. and the Minus 5. Hummel declined to participate. First-era material dominated Big Star's performances, with the occasional addition of a song from the 2005 album In Space.

Stringfellow recalled that during the 1990s, "We were working out the set list and we went to this little cafe. Little did I know we'd be playing that set for the next ten years". The resurrected band made its debut at the 1993 University of Missouri spring music festival. A recording of the performance was issued on CD by Zoo Records as Columbia: Live at Missouri University. The concert was followed by tours of Europe and Japan, as well as an appearance on The Tonight Show.

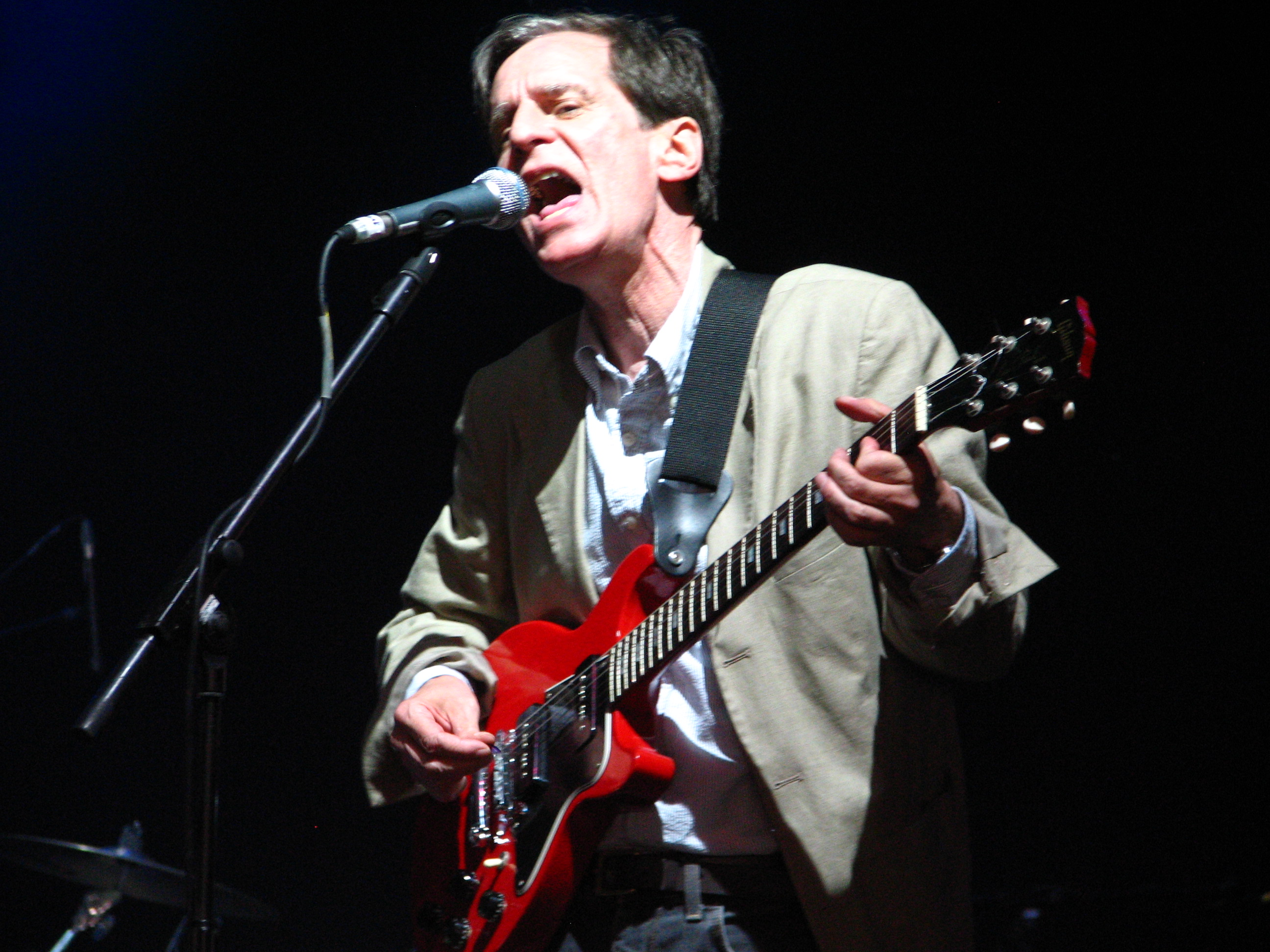
Alex Chilton in 2009 during a Big Star performance at Hyde Park

Big Star's first post-reunion studio recording was the song "Hot Thing", recorded in the mid-1990s for the Big Star tribute album Big Star, Small World. As with their prior studio release, however, the tribute album was delayed for years due to its record company going under. Originally scheduled for a 1998 release on Ignition Records, the album was eventually released in 2006 on Koch Records.

In Space was released on September 27, 2005, on the Rykodisc label. Recorded during 2004, the album consisted of new material mostly co-written by Chilton, Stephens, Auer, and Stringfellow. Reviewing In Space, Rolling Stone's David Fricke first pointed out that the context of the release was now "a world expecting that American Beatles ideal all over again" from a band that "achieved its power-pop perfection when no one else was looking." In Fricke's estimation, this seemingly unrealistic expectation was met in part: "It's here – in the jangly longing and ice-wall harmonies of 'Lady Sweet'" — however, Fricke found that the successful songs were interleaved with "the eccentric R&B and demo-quality glam rock that have made Chilton's solo records a mixed blessing," and that "'A Whole New Thing' starts out like old T.Rex, then goes nowhere special." Warming nevertheless to "the rough sunshine" of "Best Chance", Fricke concluded, "In Space is no #1 Record, but at its brightest, it is Big Star in every way."

The band appeared at San Francisco's Fillmore Auditorium on October 20, 2007, with Oranger as the opening act. Big Star performed at the 2008 Rhythm Festival, staged from August 29–31 in Bedfordshire, U.K. On June 16, 2009, the #1 Record/Radio City double album was reissued in remastered form. The same month, it was announced that a film of Big Star's history, based on Rob Jovanovic's book Big Star: The Story of Rock's Forgotten Band, was in pre-production. On July 1, 2009, Big Star performed at a concert in Hyde Park, London, U.K. On September 15, 2009, Rhino Records issued a four-CD box set containing 98 recordings made between 1968 and 1975. Keep an Eye on the Sky included live and demo versions of Big Star songs, solo work, and material from Bell's earlier bands Rock City and Icewater. On November 18, 2009, the band performed at the Brooklyn Masonic Temple in New York City.

== Post-Chilton releases and tributes ==
=== Alex Chilton memorial shows ===
On March 17, 2010, Chilton suffered a fatal heart attack. He was pronounced dead on arrival at Tulane Medical Center in New Orleans. Big Star had been scheduled to play at SXSW Music Festival that same week. The remaining members, joined by special guests original bassist Andy Hummel, M. Ward, Evan Dando, R.E.M. bassist Mike Mills, and Chris Stamey, staged the concert as a tribute to him.

=== "Big Star's Third" shows ===
Four months after Chilton's death, Hummel died of cancer on July 19, 2010. Asked about the band's plans after the death of Chilton and Hummel, Stephens told Billboard, "It's music we all really love to play, and we love to play it together, so we're trying to figure out a way forward where we can keep doing it." In a Rolling Stone interview, Stephens said that the May 2010 tribute performance would be the group's final show as Big Star, although not his last show with Auer and Stringfellow, stating, "I can't see us going out as Big Star ... But I would hate to compound the loss of Alex by saying,'That's it' for Ken and Jon, too. I can't imagine not playing with them. There's so much fun—but an emotional bond there too."

In December 2010, under the billing "Big Star's Third", Stephens teamed with Mitch Easter, Stamey, and Mills, along with a string section, to perform a live tribute performance of Big Star's album Third/Sister Lovers in Chapel Hill, North Carolina. Joined by additional performers such as Matthew Sweet, Big Star's Third was performed in a similar tribute concert in New York City on March 26, 2011, and at the Barbican in London on May 28, 2012. The project continued with concerts in Chicago and New York in 2013, a January 2014 concert in Sydney, Australia, and a series of U.S. shows that included Seattle's Bumbershoot festival on August 31, 2014. In November 2014, Auer and Stringfellow rejoined Stephens, Easter, Stamey, and Mills for a free benefit performance in Athens, Georgia. As of 2017, Big Star's Third were still performing.

On April 21, 2017, Concord Records released a Big Star's Third live concert documentary on two DVDs, along with a three-CD live album, both titled Thank You, Friends: Big Star's Third Live... and More. The concert was performed in April 2016 at Glendale, California's Alex Theatre.

=== Posthumous releases ===
In June 2011, Ardent Records released the EP Live Tribute to Alex Chilton, and Stephens confirmed on the Ardent blog that the tribute performance in May 2010 was the last performance for Big Star as a band. A documentary titled Big Star: Nothing Can Hurt Me (2012), directed by Drew DeNicola and Olivia Mori, chronicled the group's career and band members' solo efforts. In 2013, the documentary was released in theaters and on DVD, and it had a limited theatrical re-release in England in August 2014. In November 2014, Live in Memphis was released by Omnivore Recordings on CD, vinyl, and as a DVD of Big Star's performance of October 29, 1994, their only known show to be professionally filmed in its entirety. According to Mojo, the DVD documents how Big Star's 1990s lineup defied expectations and endured for another 16 years: "Chilton's musicality is mesmerising as he drives the band. … Alternating between lead and rhythm, he plays with a mix of laser focus and utter insouciant cool."

=== The Big Star Quintet ===
In 2024, Jody Stephens announced a tour of the US and Europe to celebrate the 50th anniversary of Radio City with an all-star band, The Big Star Quintet, including R.E.M.'s Mike Mills, Wilco's Pat Sansone, The Posies' Jon Auer, and Chris Stamey of The dBs. The Quintet is scheduled to play in Ireland in 2026 with Norman Blake of Teenage Fanclub replacing Pat Sansone in the lineup.

== Musical style and influences ==
Bell took up guitar when 12 or 13, but only on hearing the first Beatles records was he motivated to play the instrument regularly. He acted as lead and rhythm guitarist and vocalist for a sequence of bands, performing songs by the Beatles, the Rolling Stones, the Kinks, the Zombies, and the Animals. Chilton's first awareness of music came at the age of 6 when his brother repeatedly played a record by the Coasters. His father's liking for jazz then exposed him over the next few years to the music of Glenn Miller, Ray Charles, and Dave Brubeck. Chilton's enthusiasm for music took hold when at age 13 he first heard Beatles records; he recalled having known of 1950s rock 'n' roll, but "by 1959 Elvis was syrup and Jerry Lee was pretty much gone, and the rockabilly thing was sort of over so I didn't get really caught up in the rock scene until the Beatles came along".

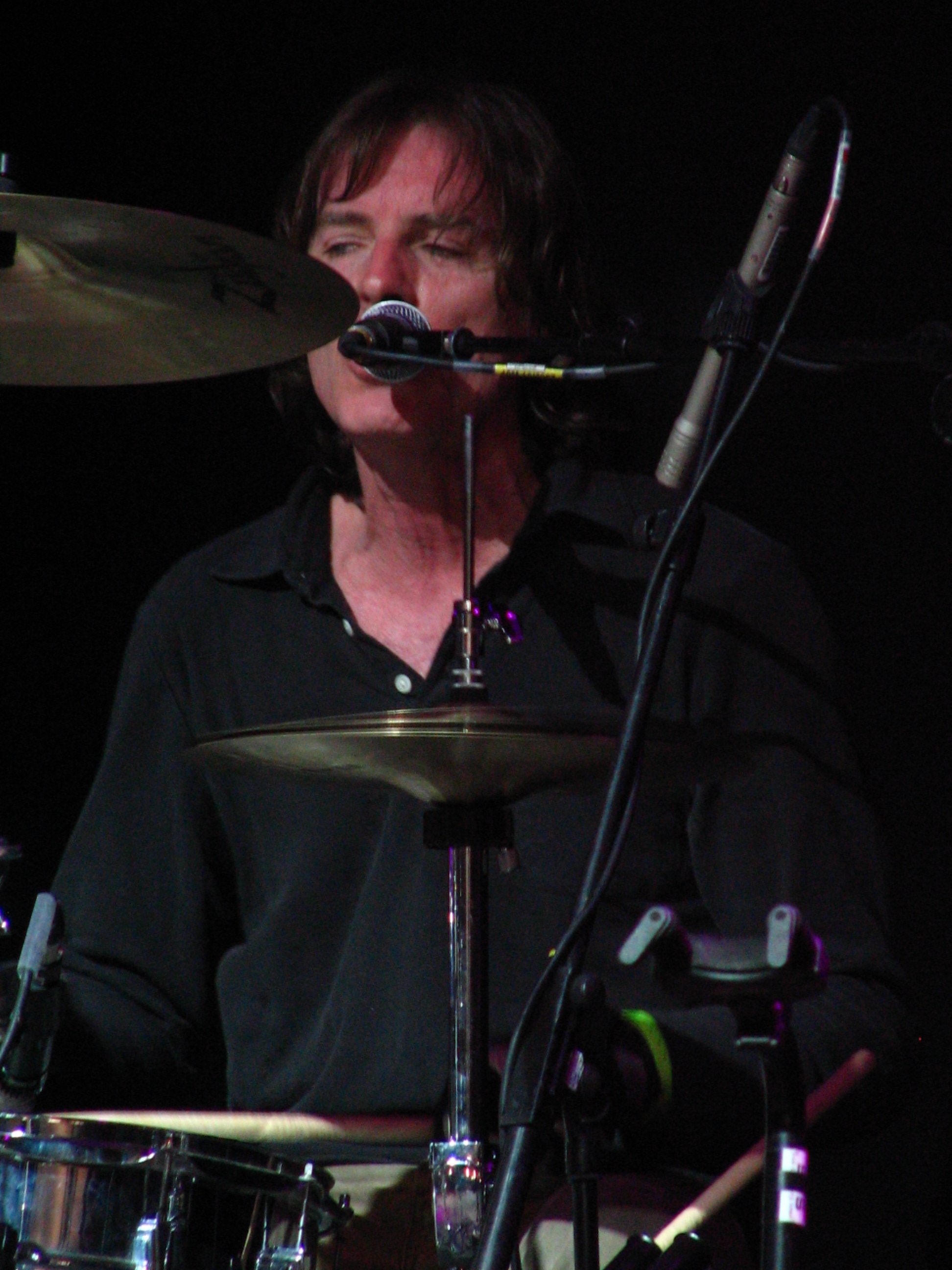
Jody Stephens in 2009 during a Big Star performance at Hyde Park

Chilton took up electric guitar at 13, playing along with Beatles songs, later saying, "I really loved the mid-sixties British pop music [...] all two and a half minutes or three minutes long, really appealing songs. So I've always aspired to that same format, that's what I like. Not to mention the rhythm and blues and the Stax stuff, too". Chilton abandoned his guitar-playing during his time with the Box Tops and then took up the instrument again; he met Roger McGuinn, guitarist for the Byrds, and developed particular interest in electric guitar and acoustic folk. Stephens enjoyed the music of Otis Redding, the Isley Brothers, the Who, the Kinks, and especially the Beatles.

Hummel likewise was a member of more than one band during his early musical years, again influenced by the Beatles and other British Invasion acts. The bassist also played acoustic guitar for personal enjoyment, following the styles of Simon & Garfunkel and Joni Mitchell and using finger-picking techniques to play folk and bluegrass. Most songs on the first three albums are credited to either Bell/Chilton or Chilton, but some credit Hummel, Stephens and others, as either writer or co-writer. At the only seven live performances in the original era, the last of which took place before the second album's release, all four members contributed vocally.

While primarily inspired by the music of the Beatles and other British Invasion bands, acknowledging too the jangle pop and power pop of the period, Big Star also incorporated dark, nihilistic themes to produce a striking blend of musical and lyrical styles. The body of work resulting from the first era was a precursor of the alternative rock of the 1980s and 1990s, at the same time yielding material today considered an outstanding example of power pop. The stylistic range is evident from modern day critiques. Bogdanov et al., commenting on #1 Record in their All Music Guide to Rock, perceive in "The Ballad of El Goodo" a "luminous, melancholy ballad", whereas John Borack's Ultimate Power Pop Guide singles out Radio City's "September Gurls" as a "glorious, glittering jewel" of power pop.

Borack notes too that Third/Sister Lovers is "slower, darker and a good deal weirder" than the first two albums, identifying "Holocaust" as "Alex Chilton at his haunting best", yet finds "Thank You Friends" exemplifying "left-field gems" also present in which "the hooks are every bit as undeniable" as before. Jovanovic writes that when recording what Peter Buckley in his Rough Guide to Rock terms the "snarling guitar rock" of the first album's "Don't Lie to Me", the band, deeming conventional instruments inadequate for the task, wheeled two Norton Commando motorcycles into the studio and gunned the engines to intensify the song's bridge. Bogdanov et al. reserve "snarl" for a Radio City song, "Mod Lang"; here Buckley writes that "the power of the performance and the erratic mix gave a sense of chaos which only added to the thrill".

== Legacy and influence ==
Although Big Star's first era came to an end in 1974, the band acquired a cult following in the 1980s when new acts began to acknowledge the early material's significance. R.E.M.'s Peter Buck admitted, "We've sort of flirted with greatness, but we've yet to make a record as good as Revolver or Highway 61 Revisited or Exile on Main Street or Big Star's Third. I don't know what it'll take to push us on to that level, but I think we've got it in us." Chilton, however, told an interviewer in 1992, "I'm constantly surprised that people fall for Big Star the way they do... People say Big Star made some of the best rock 'n roll albums ever. And I say they're wrong."

In 2014, Paul Stanley cited Big Star as an influence to early Kiss moments: "We've always been about verses, choruses, bridges (...) It's called a hook for a reason, because it grabs you. And that's my mentality. Give me the Raspberries. Give me Small Faces. Give me Big Star."

The band was also an inspiration for the Replacements, who recorded the song "Alex Chilton" on their Pleased to Meet Me album.

"While the band no longer exists, the music that Alex, Chris, Andy and I originally made together under the auspices of John Fry still calls a community of those of us with like minds to come together and have fun with it," Stephens wrote in 2017 in a note published in the liner notes of The Best of Big Star.

Critics have continued to cite Big Star's first three albums as a profound influence on subsequent musicians. Rolling Stone notes that Big Star "created a seminal body of work that never stopped inspiring succeeding generations of rockers, from the power-pop revivalists of the late 1970s to alternative rockers at the end of the century to the indie rock nation in the new millennium". Jason Ankeny, music critic for AllMusic, identifies Big Star as "one of the most mythic and influential cult acts in all of rock & roll", whose "impact on subsequent generations of indie bands on both sides of the Atlantic is surpassed only by that of the Velvet Underground". Ankeny describes Big Star's second album, Radio City, as "their masterpiece—ragged and raw guitar-pop infused with remarkable intensity and spontaneity".

In 1992, Rykodisc generated further interest in the band when it reissued Third/Sister Lovers and released a posthumous compilation of Bell's solo material, I Am the Cosmos. In his 2007 book Shake Some Action: The Ultimate Power Pop Guide, John Borack ranks the #1 Record/Radio City double album at No. 2 in his chart "The 200 Greatest Power Pop Albums". Rolling Stone includes #1 Record, Radio City and Third/Sister Lovers in The 500 Greatest Albums of All Time and "September Gurls" and "Thirteen" in The 500 Greatest Songs of All Time. In addition to R.E.M., artists including Teenage Fanclub, The Replacements, Primal Scream, the Posies, and Bill Lloyd and the dB's cite Big Star as an inspiration, and the band's influence on Game Theory, Matthew Sweet, and Velvet Crush is also acknowledged.

On their 2022 album Tremblers and Goggles by Rank, Guided By Voices paid tribute to Big Star with the song "Alex Bell". The lyrics include the refrain "Walking down Alex Bell, thinking of Alex...I see you around every time there's a ghost in town."

- A cover version of "September Gurls" appeared on the Bangles' 1986 triple platinum album Different Light. "September Gurls", Borack wrote, "was and is the sine qua non of power pop, a glorious, glittering jewel with every facet cut and shined to absolute perfection.... a peerless, aching distillation of love and longing. 'September Gurls' may not actually be the greatest song ever recorded, but for the duration of its 2:47 running time, you can be forgiven for believing it is."
- The 1987 tribute song "Alex Chilton", co-written by three members of the Replacements, was released as a single from the album Pleased to Meet Me and contains the lyric "I never travel far without a little Big Star."
- "I'm in Love with a Girl" from Radio City features in the soundtrack of the 2009 film Adventureland.
- In 1998, an ad hoc, shortened version of #1 Record's "In the Street" (recorded by Todd Griffin) was used as the theme song for the sitcom That '70s Show, and in 1999, a new version titled "That '70s Song (In the Street)" was recorded by Cheap Trick also specifically for the show. "That '70s Song" and Big Star's own "September Gurls" are included on the 1999 album That '70s Album (Rockin') released by the television program's producers.
- The 2006 tribute album Big Star, Small World includes Big Star covers by the Posies, Teenage Fanclub, Gin Blossoms, Wilco, the Afghan Whigs, and Whiskeytown, among others.
- Lucero, a Memphis, Tennessee-based alternative country band, covered "I'm in Love with a Girl" on their 2015 release All a Man Should Do, an album which takes its title from a lyric in the song. Founding member Jody Stephens, and later additions to Big Star, provide backup on the track.
- "Thirteen" from Big Star is featured in the 2020 Disney+ film Stargirl. The song is then sung by the two leads, Grace VanderWaal as Susan "Stargirl" Caraway and Graham Verchere as Leo Borlock.

== Personnel ==
- Alex Chilton – guitars, piano, vocals (1971–1974, 1993–2010; died 2010)
- Jody Stephens – drums, vocals (1971–1974, 1993–2010)
- Chris Bell – guitars, vocals (1971–1972; died 1978)
- Andy Hummel – bass guitar, vocals (1971–1973, 2010; died 2010)
- John Lightman – bass guitar, backing vocals (1974)
- Jon Auer – guitar, vocals (1993–2010)
- Ken Stringfellow – bass guitar, vocals, keyboards (1993–2010)

== Discography ==
Studio albums

- #1 Record (Ardent/Stax, 1972)
- Radio City (Ardent/Stax, 1974)
- Third/Sister Lovers (PVC, 1978)
- In Space (Rykodisc, 2005)

Live albums

- Live (Rykodisc, 1992)
- Columbia: Live at Missouri University 4/25/93 (Zoo, 1993)
- Nobody Can Dance (Norton, 1999) – rehearsals and live recordings
- Live Tribute at the Levitt Shell (Ardent, 2011) – Big Star with John Davis
- Live in Memphis (Omnivore, 2014) – Big Star live on October 29, 1994
- Complete Columbia: Live at University of Missouri University 4/25/93 (Volcano/Legacy, 2016)
- Live at Lafayette's Music Room – Memphis, TN (Omnivore, 2018) – Big Star live in January 1973
- Live On WLIR (Omnivore, 2019) – Remastered and restored performance originally recorded and broadcast in 1974

Compilations

- Biggest (Line Records, 1994) – greatest hits
- The Best of (Big Beat Records, 1999) – greatest hits
- Big Star Story (Rykodisc, 2003) – greatest hits with one new track
- Keep an Eye on the Sky (Rhino, 2009) – box set with a live disc
- Nothing Can Hurt Me (Omnivore Recordings, 2013) – soundtrack to movie
- Playlist (1972–2005) (Legacy Recordings, 2013) – first compilation to cover all eras of band
- Complete Third (Omnivore, 2016) – complete recordings from the Third sessions
- The Best of Big Star (Craft Recordings, 2017) – greatest hits with some rare mixes and edits of songs

Big Star's Third

- Thank You, Friends: Big Star's Third Live... and More (2017, Concord) – Big Star's Third concert, recorded live in April 2016 (3 CDs)

== Videography ==
Big Star

- Big Star: Nothing Can Hurt Me (Magnolia, DVD, 2012)
- Live in Memphis (Omnivore, DVD, 2014) – Big Star live on October 29, 1994

Big Star's Third

- Thank You, Friends: Big Star's Third Live... and More (2017, Concord) – concert documentary of Big Star's Third live performance in April 2016 (2 DVDs)
