= Chris Bell (American musician) =

American musician (1951–1978)

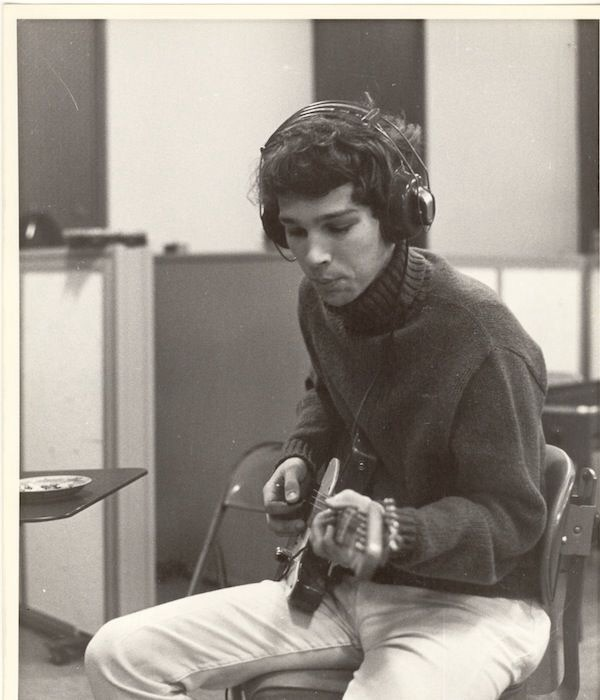
- Bell in the studio

Background information
- Born: Christopher Branford Bell; January 12, 1951; Memphis, Tennessee, U.S.
- Died: December 27, 1978 (aged 27) Memphis, Tennessee, U.S.
- Genres: Rock; power pop; jangle pop
- Occupations: Musician; singer-songwriter
- Instruments: Vocals; guitar
- Years active: 1963–1978
- Labels: Car; Rykodisc
- Formerly of: Big Star; Icewater; Rock City; The Jynx

Christopher Branford Bell (January 12, 1951 – December 27, 1978) was an American musician and singer-songwriter. Along with Alex Chilton, he led the power pop band Big Star through its first album #1 Record (1972). He also pursued a solo career throughout the mid-1970s, resulting in the posthumous I Am the Cosmos LP.

AllMusic Guide praised Bell as "one of the unsung heroes of American pop music" and noted his lasting impression, saying: "Despite a life marked by tragedy and a career crippled by commercial indifference, the singer/songwriter's slim body of recorded work proved massively influential on the generations of indie rockers who emerged in his wake."

Bell's catalogue of proto-alternative rock has inspired the likes of Elliott Smith, Beck, R.E.M., Teenage Fanclub, Pixies, Primal Scream, Afghan Whigs, Pete Yorn, Wilco, the Posies, and the Replacements, all of whom have covered his music or expressed their admiration for Big Star in the press.

His life was documented in the documentary Big Star: Nothing Can Hurt Me, released in 2013 by Magnolia Pictures.

Bell's life, and the career of Big Star, was documented in the 2018 book There Was a Light: The Cosmic History of Chris Bell and the Rise of Big Star. The 400-page oral-history style bio contains rare interviews with Bell, his bandmates, friends, family and notable fans.

== Early career ==
Before his more famous work in the 1970s with Alex Chilton, Bell played in a number of Memphis garage bands beginning in the 1960s. He had started playing music at age 12, influenced heavily by the Beatles and other British Invasion groups like the Yardbirds and the Who. One of Bell's early groups included Memphis natives Richard Rosebrough and Terry Manning, with whom he continued to work for the rest of his music career.

In 1964 and 1965, Bell played lead guitar in a British Invasion-influenced group called the Jynx (the name being a pun on The Kinks) with local musicians, including lead vocalist Mike Harris, rhythm guitarist David Hoback, drummer DeWitt Shy, and bassist Bill Cunningham, and later, bassist Leo Goff. Other lead vocalists at some of the group's shows and rehearsals (though not present on their recordings) included local teens Ames Yates, Vance Alexander, and Alex Chilton. Chilton, who attended many Jynx shows and sang lead vocals at a couple of gigs, soon joined the Box Tops with Cunningham, as the Jynx split up in 1966. Bell continued to perform and record in Memphis throughout the rest of the decade, including a stint in the heavier psych-rock band Christmas Future with Terry Manning and Steve Rhea. By the late 1960s, after attending UT in Knoxville, he had turned his focus toward writing original songs, and Manning brought Bell into the studio for his first professional recordings as a session guitarist.

== Big Star ==
The group later known as Big Star stemmed from two Bell band projects that began in the late 1960s while he recorded and performed live in groups named Icewater and Rock City. These groups featured a revolving set of musicians including Jody Stephens, Terry Manning, Tom Eubanks, Andy Hummel, Richard Rosebrough, Vance Alexander, and Steve Rhea. Recordings by these groups appear on the various artists collection Rockin' Memphis 1960's–1970's Vol. 1, Rock City (2003), and Looking Forward: The Roots of Big Star (2017).

Bell asked Chilton to join several months after the group had started performing. Eventually, during a period of recording demos and tracks for their first album, the group settled on the name 'Big Star'. The lineup for Big Star's first album was composed of Bell (guitars, vocals), Chilton (guitars, vocals), Hummel (bass, vocals), and Stephens (drums, vocals). Bell and Chilton wrote most of the group's songs, with occasional writing contributions from Hummel and Stephens. Manning played the keyboards and several session horn players were employed. Bell was even more influenced by the music of the British Invasion than Chilton, and he steadfastly retained his Beatles-oriented pop influences throughout his career.

Along with Ardent Studios founder John Fry and engineer Terry Manning, Bell is credited with much of the mixing and engineering work done on the first Big Star album #1 Record. After this album failed to achieve commercial success (partially due to confusion by its soul-oriented distributor Stax in marketing the album), Bell left the band in 1972. He struggled with depression for the rest of his life. He also had problems with alcohol and other drugs while also becoming immersed in Christianity. According to his brother David, Bell may have left Big Star due to a belief that he was overshadowed by the more famous Chilton.

== Solo work ==
Bell concentrated on solo work after leaving Big Star, recording demos at Ardent Studios and Shoe Recording in Memphis with old friends including Rosebrough, Manning, Cunningham, Ken Woodley, and occasionally Chilton and Jim Dickinson. One of Bell's better known solo songs from this period is "You and Your Sister", featuring Bell's guitar work and vocals, Chilton's backing vocal, and Cunningham's string arrangements and bass work. From 1975 to 1976, Bell co-produced recording sessions for the power pop group Prix, and contributed guitar and backing vocals. Bell also played in groups with local songwriter Keith Sykes, as well as the Baker Street Regulars with Van Duren and Jody Stephens in 1976.

During the late 1970s, a few of Bell's pop song lyrics began to reflect the influence of his interest in Christian spirituality. Although he released "I Am the Cosmos" backed with "You and Your Sister" as a single in 1978 on Chris Stamey's Car Records label, none of his solo material was released on a full-length album during his lifetime. At this time, Bell worked at his father's restaurant and continued to grapple with clinical depression.

Almost 14 years after his death, the songs from his Car Records single and several of his other 1970s recordings were released on 1992's I Am the Cosmos full-length CD on Rykodisc. As with his work with Big Star, the album received highly favorable critical reviews. Giving the album an "A−", Robert Christgau wrote that it was "clear from Bell's very posthumous solo album . . . that Big Star was his idea."

In 2009, I Am the Cosmos was re-released in as a deluxe two-CD version by Rhino Handmade with lengthy liner notes, alternate versions, and additional tracks.

== Personal life ==
Bell was an amateur photographer in his earlier career, especially in the late 1960s. He has been described as 'quite accomplished', and made his own prints in the style of Jimi Hendrix album covers.

According to Rob Jovanovic, Bell struggled throughout his life with repressed sexual attraction to other men and internalized homophobia. In later life he turned to born-again Christianity in an attempt to deal with his difficult relationship with his own sexuality, his friends reporting he was "determined not to be gay".

Bell dealt with suicidal ideation and suicidal tendencies at times during his life, expressing in the song "Better Save Yourself" that he had attempted suicide twice.

== Death ==
On December 27, 1978, sometime after 1:00 a.m., Bell was on his way home from a band rehearsal when he lost control of his Triumph TR7 sports car and struck a wooden light pole on the side of the road. The pole fell and killed him instantly. He was 27. His funeral was held the next day.

Chris Bell is buried at Memphis Funeral Home and Memorial Gardens in Bartlett, Tennessee.

== Influence ==
Bell's music and that of Big Star became popular with alternative rock musicians in the 1980s through word of mouth. Eventually, well-known artists including R.E.M., Ian Moore, Teenage Fanclub, and The Replacements began touting the recordings of Big Star as significant works. This Mortal Coil, which had earlier recorded versions of post-Chris Bell Big Star songs, recorded versions of "I Am the Cosmos" and "You and Your Sister" on their 1991 album Blood. In 1992, The Posies released a 7" single featuring "Feel"/"I Am the Cosmos" on Pop Llama.

Big Star's pop song "In the Street", which had featured the tight harmonies of Bell and Chilton, was chosen as a representative song of the 1970s decade by the producers of the television show That '70s Show in 1998; though the Big Star recording of the song was never featured, two different covers of the song were used over the series' run as the theme song to the opening credits. The second, recorded by Cheap Trick in 1999, with revised lyrics, was also included on That '70s Show Presents That '70s Album: Rockin'.

Later, Bell's song "Speed of Sound" appeared on the Flaming Lips album Late Night Tales: The Flaming Lips. Bell's version of "Speed of Sound" is heard over the opening credits to the film Nick and Norah's Infinite Playlist. Beck covers "I Am the Cosmos" in concert. Bell's song "There Was a Light" was used in the soundtrack to the Patriot (TV series) 2018 episode "Loaded."

== Discography ==
The Jynx EPs

- Greatest Hits! – (Norton Records, 10-inch vinyl EP, 2000) TED-1003

Icewater and Rock City LPs

- Rock City – (Lucky Seven Records CD, 2003) CD 9209
- Looking Forward: The Roots of Big Star – (Omnivore Recordings, 2017)

Big Star LPs ft. Chris Bell

- #1 Record – (Ardent Records LP, 1972) ADS-2803

Big Star singles ft. Chris Bell

- "Don't Lie to Me" / "Watch the Sunrise" (Ardent, 1972) ADA-2904
- "Thirteen" / "Watch The Sunrise" (Ardent, 1972) (Promo, mislabeled: reads "Don't Lie to Me" but plays "Thirteen".) ADA-2904
- "In the Street" / "When My Baby's Beside Me" (Ardent, 1972) ADA-2902
- "Feel (alternate mix)" / "Mod Lang (unissued single mix)" (Rhino, 2009) R7 521272

Chris Bell solo LPs

- I Am the Cosmos – (Rykodisc CASS/CD, 1992) RCD 10222
- I Am the Cosmos – (Four Men with Beard, vinyl LP, 2006) 4M 143
- I Am the Cosmos - Deluxe Edition – (Rhino Handmade 2CD, 2009) RHM2 521305
- I Am the Cosmos - (Omnivore Recordings LP, 2017) OVLP-231
- I Am the Cosmos - Deluxe Edition – (Omnivore Recordings 2CD, 2017) OVCD-231

Chris Bell solo singles

- "I Am the Cosmos"/"You and Your Sister" – (Car Records single, 1978) CRR6
- "Country Morn" – (Back of Car zine, 6-inch promo flexi-disc, 1995)
- "I Am the Cosmos"/"You and Your Sister" – (Rhino/Car, limited w/ CD, 2009) PR7 521384

Big Star compilations

- A Little Big Star (Rykodisc, 1992) – promo sampler
- Biggest (Line Records, 1994)
- The Best of (Ace Records, 1999)
- Big Star Story (Rykodisc, 2003)
- Keep an Eye on the Sky (Rhino, 2009) – box set
- Nothing Can Hurt Me (Omnivore Recordings, 2013) – film soundtrack
- Playlist (1972-2005) (Legacy Recordings, 2013)
- Thank You Friends: The Music of Big Star, Alex Chilton, and Chris Bell (Omnivore Recordings promo CD, 2013)

Big Star EPs w/ Chris Bell

- Jesus Christ (Omnivore Recordings, 2015) - 10", Limited Edition – OVS10-153

Various Artists compilations

- D.I.Y.: Come Out and Play - American Power Pop (1975-78) - "I Am the Cosmos" – (Rhino Records CD, 1993)
- Oxford American: 2003 Southern Music CD No. 6 – "You and Your Sister" – (Oxford American promo CD, 2003)
- Rockin' Memphis: 1960s–1970s, Volume 1 – (Lucky Seven Records CD, 2003)
- Garage Beat '66, Vol. 2: Chicks Are for Kids! – (Sundazed Music CD, 2004)
- Thank You Friends: The Ardent Records Story – (Big Beat CD, April 2008)
- Nick and Norah's Infinite Playlist: Music from the Original Motion Picture Soundtrack – (Atlantic, 2008)

Appears on

- Freaks of Nature (film) - "My Life is Right" (Big Star) featured in film – (Columbia Pictures, 2015)

Chris Bell guest spots as guitarist

- Terry Manning Home Sweet Home (Enterprise, 1970)
- Tommy Hoehn Blow Yourself Up / Love You All Day single (Power Play, 1977)

== Filmography ==
- Big Star: Nothing Can Hurt Me (2013, Magnolia Pictures)

== Bibliography ==
- There Was a Light: The Cosmic History of Chris Bell and the Rise of Big Star (Winter 2017, HoZac Books)
- Big Star: The Story of Rock's Forgotten Band (2005/2013 updated, Chicago Review Press/Harper Collins UK)

== See also ==
- 27 Club
