= Andy Hummel =

American singer and songwriter

- Born: John Andrew Hummel; January 26, 1951; Valley Forge, Pennsylvania, U.S.
- Died: July 19, 2010 (aged 59) Weatherford, Texas
- Genres: Power pop
- Occupations: Musician, singer, songwriter
- Instruments: Bass guitar, piano, vocals
- Years active: 1966–1974, 2010
- Formerly of: Big Star

John Andrew Hummel (January 26, 1951 – July 19, 2010) was an American bassist and singer-songwriter best known as the bass player of Big Star.

== Background and career ==
Hummel was born January 26, 1951, in Valley Forge, Pennsylvania to John Vernon and Barbara Walker Hummel, who was crowned Miss America in 1947. John Andrew grew up in Memphis, Tennessee and graduated in 1969 from Memphis University School.

John Andrew Hummel became good friends with Chris Bell during high school; the pair frequently performed along with several other musicians, including drummer Jody Stephens, whom they had known since junior high school, in a band known as Icewater. In 1971, Bell asked singer Alex Chilton to join him, Hummel, and Stephens in a group which was eventually named Big Star.

Hummel recorded with Big Star on two of their three albums, #1 Record and Radio City. He contributed as the bass player as well as a writer on "The India Song" on #1 Record. On the Radio City album, he wrote "Way Out West" and co-wrote "Life Is White", "What's Going Ahn", "Back of a Car", and "Daisy Glaze".

After the release of Radio City, Hummel faced the choice of staying with the band and dropping out of university, or leaving the band and finishing college. He chose college and earned a Bachelor of Arts degree in English literature from Rhodes College in Memphis in 1974, planning on a career in teaching. He returned to school and earned an associate degree in mechanical engineering technology from State Technical Institute at Memphis in 1978. In 1999, he earned an MBA in finance from the University of Dallas.

He moved to Fort Worth, Texas in 1978. He was a 30-year employee of Lockheed Martin. He and Patti Martin were married on November 3, 1979. They have three children: a daughter, Cady, and two sons, Drew and Walker.

Big Star reunited in the mid-1990s without Chris Bell, who died in a car crash in 1978. Hummel also declined to take part, although in March 2010, he played at a special performance at SXSW in honor of Alex Chilton, who had died suddenly just three days prior.

Four months later, Hummel died of cancer, on July 19, 2010.

== Discography ==
=== Albums ===
Studio albums

- #1 Record (Ardent/Stax, 1972)
- Radio City (Ardent/Stax, 1974)
