= John Fry (music producer) =

American record producer (1944–2014)

John Edward Fry (December 31, 1944 – December 18, 2014) was the founder of Ardent Records in Memphis, Tennessee. It includes Ardent Studios; two record labels, Ardent Records (Christian label) and Ardent Music (mainstream label); and a production company, Ardent Film Department. The business was founded in 1959. It moved into commercial spaces at 1457 National Street in 1966.

== Music career ==
Fry engineered and produced an eclectic array of records. As of 2014, Ardent Studios had recorded over 70 gold and platinum albums and singles, many for Stax Records. He was best known for his work on the first three Big Star albums and as the band's mentor.

Ardent Studios was used by recording artists including Led Zeppelin, Bob Dylan, James Taylor, ZZ Top, R.E.M., Stevie Ray Vaughan, Al Green, the Allman Brothers Band, B.B. King, the White Stripes, the Replacements, and Three 6 Mafia as well as Stax Records recording artists including Cat Power, M.I.A., and Big Star. About 20 percent of the Stax catalog was recorded at Ardent; the major Stax artists recorded there, except for Otis Redding, who died in 1967.

Fry had served as the national president of the Society of Professional Audio Recording Services (SPARS); chairman of the Tennessee Film, Entertainment, and Music Commission; chairman of the Memphis Film Commission; president and national trustee of the Memphis Chapter of the National Academy of Recording Arts and Sciences (Grammy organization), and chairman of the Memphis and Shelby County Music Commission. He was also a board member of the Memphis Music Foundation, Visible School Music, and Worship Arts College. He was the chairman of the University of Memphis Music Industry Advisory Board.

== Awards and honors ==
Fry received the 2006 Distinguished Achievement in the Creative and Performing Arts Award from the College of Communication and Fine Arts at the University of Memphis. On November 6, 2014, Fry was inducted into the Memphis Music Hall of Fame. At the time of his induction, fewer than fifty people were in the MMHF.

== Death and legacy ==
Fry died of cardiac arrest in a Memphis hospital on December 18, 2014, at the age of 69.
