= Jody Stephens =

American drummer

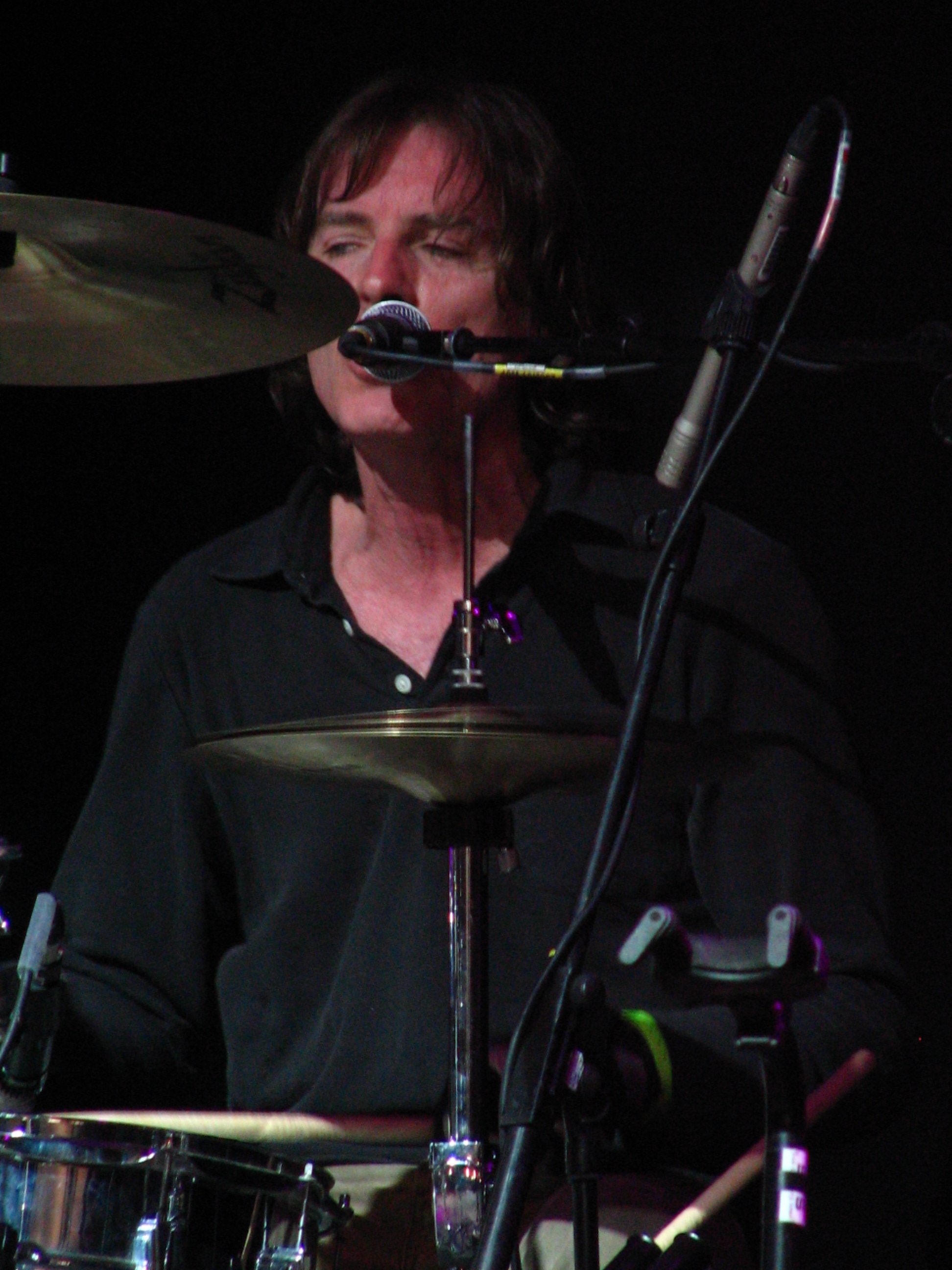
- Stephens performing in 2009

Background information
- Born: October 4, 1952 (age 74); Memphis, Tennessee, U.S.
- Genres: Power pop, rock
- Occupations: Musician, Ardent Studios CEO
- Instrument: Drums
- Years active: 1971–present

Jody Stephens (born October 4, 1952) is an American musician and producer who has played drums in Big Star (with Alex Chilton of the Box Tops) and Golden Smog (with members of the Jayhawks, and Wilco). After the deaths of Chris Bell in 1978, and Alex Chilton and Andy Hummel, both in 2010, Stephens is the last surviving original member of Big Star.

Stephens also performs and records with Luther Russell as Those Pretty Wrongs. Their debut 7" was released in 2015 on Burger Records and their debut LP came out in 2016 on the Ardent Music label. Stephens contributed drums to "The Student Becomes the Teacher", a 2018 song by The Lemon Twigs, who have cited Big Star as being an influence. In 2019 Stephens produced the LP Electric Power for rock/power soul band the Reputations from Austin, Texas.

== Discography ==
=== With Big Star ===
Studio albums

- #1 Record (Ardent/Stax, 1972)
- Radio City (Ardent/Stax, 1974)
- Third/Sister Lovers (PVC, 1978)
- In Space (Rykodisc, 2005)

=== With Golden Smog ===
Studio albums

- Weird Tales (Rykodisc, 1998)
- Another Fine Day (Lost Highway, 2006)

=== With Those Pretty Wrongs ===
Studio albums

- Those Pretty Wrongs (Ardent, 2016)
- Zed for Zulu (Burger Records, 2019)
- Holiday Camp (Curation Records, 2023)

=== With The Lemon Twigs ===
Studio albums

- Go To School (4AD, 2018)

=== With The Reputations ===
Studio albums

- Electric Power (Nine Mile Records, 2018)
