= G.T.O. (album) =

Studio album by Ronny & the Daytonas
- Released: 1964
- Recorded: 1964
- Studios: Phillips Recording, Memphis, Tennessee
- Genres: Surf rock; rock and roll
- Length: 26:22
- Label: Mala
- Producer: Bill Justis

Ronny & the Daytonas chronology
G.T.O. (1964)	Sandy (1966)

Singles from G.T.O.
- 1. "G.T.O." Released: June 1964; 2. "California Bound" Released: October 1964; 3. "Bucket 'T'" Released: November 1964

Professional ratings
Review scores
Source	Rating
Allmusic	4.5/5 stars

G.T.O. is the debut studio album by American band Ronny & the Daytonas, and was released in 1964 on Mala Records, MALA 4001.

== Background ==
The group was formed in 1964 when Bill Justis (best known for his hit "Raunchy") became their producer and manager. They went into the studio and recorded a dozen songs primarily written by group member John "Bucky" Wilkin, who was the son of noted country music writer, Marijohn Wilkin. These were interspersed with several covers of surfing/car songs by artists such as Chuck Berry and Jan and Dean. The album and three singles all charted on US Billboard magazine charts. In 1989, vocalist/guitarist Alex Chilton of the 1960s era group The Box Tops, released a cover of "G.T.O." on his EP Black List.

== Track listing ==
1. "California Bound" (John "Bucky" Wilkin) – 2:14
2. "Antique '32 Studebaker Dictator Coupe" (Jerry Dean Smith) – 2:05
3. "Hot Rod Baby" (Smith) – 2:02
4. "Little Rail Job" (Wilkin) – 2:19
5. "Hey Little Girl" (Wilkin) – 2:16
6. "Bucket "T”" (Don Altfeld, Jan Berry, Roger Christian, Dean Torrence) – 2:37
7. "G.T.O." (Wilkin) – 2:30
8. "The Little Sting Ray That Could" (Wayne Moss, Bobby Russell, Bergen White, Neil Wilburn) – 2:07
9. "Surfin' in the Summertime" (Wilkin) – 1:50
10. "Back in the U.S.A." (Chuck Berry) – 2:16
11. "Hot Rod City" (Bill Justis, Wilkin) – 2:05
12. "Little Scrambler" (Wilkin) – 1:49

== Personnel ==
=== Ronny and the Daytonas ===
- John "Bucky" Wilkin (aka Ronny) – vocals, guitar
- Paul Jensen – guitar, vocals
- Lee Kraft – guitar
- Thomas Ramey – bass, guitar
- Lynn Williams – drums

These were the Daytonas at the time of the recording, although many session musicians were also used. The touring band changed members frequently.

=== Technical ===
- Bill Justis – producer
- Win Bruder – cover design
- Buck Wilkin – photography

== Charts ==
=== Album ===
Year	Chart	Position
1964	Billboard 200	122

=== Singles ===
Year	Single	Billboard Hot 100
1964	"GTO"	4
1964	"Bucket "T""	54
1964	"California Bound"	74
