= Johnny and the Hurricanes discography =

- Studio albums: 3
- Live albums: 4
- Compilation albums: 16
- Singles: 28

This is the discography of American instrumental rock band Johnny and the Hurricanes.

== Albums ==
=== Studio albums ===
Year	Title	Details	Peak chart positions	
Year	Title	Details	UK	US
1959	Johnny and the Hurricanes	Released: October 1959; Label: Warwick, London	—	—
1960	Stormsville	Released: February 1960; Label: Warwick, London	18	34
1960	The Big Sound of Johnny and the Hurricanes	Released: October 1960; Label: Bigtop, London	13	—
"—" denotes releases that did not chart.

=== Live albums ===
Year	Title	Details
1965	Live at the Star Club in Hamburg, Germany	Released: 1965; Label: Atila
1981	Live in Hamburg	Released: 1981; Label: Strand; Germany-only release
1995	Live Volume 1	Released: October 1995; Label: Atila; Recording from January 1, 1963
2000	Live Volume 2	Released: June 2000; Label: Atila

=== Compilation albums ===
Year	Title (Note: This is a list of compilation albums released in the US and/or UK. Numerous other compilations have been released in Europe, particularly in Germany.)	Details
1975	The Very Best of Johnny and the Hurricanes	Released: 1975; Label: Contempo-Raries; UK-only release
1980	Juke Box Giants	Released: 1980; Label: Phoenix 20
1981	The Best of Johnny and the Hurricanes	Released: November 1981; Label: Decca
1982	Johnny and the Hurricanes	Released: October 1982; Label: Dakota; UK-only release
1988	The Collection	Released: 1988; Label: Castle Communications; UK-only release
1988	Greatest Hits	Released: 1988; Label: Evergreen
1996	The Definitive Collection	Released: September 1996; Label: Charly; UK-only release
1997	The Masters	Released: 1997; Label: Eagle; UK-only release
1999	The Very Best of Johnny and the Hurricanes	Released: 1999; Label: Hallmark; Released in the US in 2001
2000	The EP Collection	Released: July 2000; Label: See for Miles; UK-only release
2001	The Legends Collection	Released: April 2001; Label: Dressed to Kill; UK-only release
2008	Rock 'n' Roll Legends	Released: June 2008; Label: Charly
2013	The Very Best of Johnny & the Hurricanes	Released: March 2013; Label: One Day
2014	Rock 'n' Roll Legends Collection	Released: 2014; Label: One & Only
2015	Hurricane Force!	Released: 30 March 2015; Label: Ace; Contains, rare, unissued and live tracks
2016	Extended Play...	Released: 25 March 2016; Label: Great Voices of the Century; UK-only release
"—" denotes releases that did not chart or were not released in that territory.

== Singles ==
Year	Titles (A-side, B-side) Both sides from same album except where indicated	Peak chart positions									Album/Label
Year	Titles (A-side, B-side) Both sides from same album except where indicated	AUS	BEL (FL)	BEL (WA)	CAN	GER	IRE	NL	UK	US	Album/Label
1958	"Crossfire" b/w "Lazy"	25	—	—	15	—	—	—	—	23	Johnny and the Hurricanes / Warwick
1959	"Red River Rock" b/w "Buckeye"	5	2	5	3	3	5	4	3	5	Johnny and the Hurricanes / Warwick
1959	"Reveille Rock" b/w "Time Bomb"	34	17	17	39	24	—	—	14	25	Stormsville / Warwick
1959	"Beatnik Fly" b/w "Sand Storm" (non-album track)	1	—	16	1	31	—	17	8	15	The Big Sound of Johnny and the Hurricanes / BigTop
1960	"Down Yonder" b/w "Sheba" (from The Big Sound of Johnny and the Hurricanes)	15	—	—	32	32	6	17	8	48	Non-album singles / BigTop
1960	"Rocking Goose" b/w "Revival"	33	12	29	—	—	4	—	3	60; 97	Non-album singles / BigTop
1960	"You Are My Sunshine" b/w "Molly-O"	48	—	—	—	—	—	—	—	91	The Big Sound of Johnny and the Hurricanes / BigTop
1960	"Rockin' T" (Germany-only release) b/w "Sandstorm" (non-album track)	—	—	—	—	—	—	—	—	—	Stormsville / London Records
1961	"Ja-Da" b/w "Mr. Lonely"	46	—	13	—	—	—	—	14	86	Non-album singles / BigTop
1961	"Old Smokie" b/w "High Voltage"	—	—	—	—	—	—	—	24	116	Non-album singles / BigTop
1961	"O du lieber Augustin" (Germany-only release/London records) b/w "Old Smokie"	—	—	—	—	—	—	—	—	—	Non-album singles / BigTop
1961	"The "Hep" Canary" (Germany and Denmark-only release/London Records) b/w "Corn Bread" / "Catnip"	—	—	—	—	—	—	—	—	—	Stormsville/London Records
1961	"Farewell, Farewell" b/w "Traffic Jam" (from The Big Sound of Johnny and the Hurricanes/Big Top)	—	—	—	—	—	—	—	—	—	Non-album singles / *BigTop **Mala ***Atila
1962	"Salvation" * b/w "Miserlou"	—	—	—	—	—	—	—	—	—	Non-album singles / *BigTop **Mala ***Atila
1962	"Du, du liegst mir im Herzen" (Germany-only release/London records) b/w "High Voltage"	—	—	—	—	—	—	—	—	—	Non-album singles / *BigTop **Mala ***Atila
1962	"San Antonio Rose" * b/w "Come On Train"	—	—	—	—	—	—	—	—	—	Non-album singles / *BigTop **Mala ***Atila
1962	"Minnesota Fats" * b/w"The Sheik of Araby"	—	—	—	—	—	—	—	—	—	Non-album singles / *BigTop **Mala ***Atila
1963	"Theme from 'Whatever Happened to Baby Jane'" * b/w "Greens and Beans"	—	—	—	—	—	—	—	—	—	Non-album singles / *BigTop **Mala ***Atila
1963	"James Bond Theme" * b/w "The Hungry Eye" (from Stormsville/Warwick)	—	—	—	—	—	—	—	—	—	Non-album singles / *BigTop **Mala ***Atila
1963	"Greens and Beans" (Germany-only release) b/w "The Hungry Eye" (from Stormsville/London Records)	—	—	—	—	—	—	—	—	—	Non-album singles / *BigTop **Mala ***Atila
1963	"Rough Road" * b/w "Kaw-Liga"	—	—	—	—	—	—	—	—	—	Non-album singles / *BigTop **Mala ***Atila
1963	"It's a Mad, Mad, Mad, Mad World" ** b/w "Shadows"	—	—	—	—	—	—	—	—	—	Non-album singles / *BigTop **Mala ***Atila
1964	"Money Honey" ** b/w "That's All"	—	—	—	—	—	—	—	—	—	Non-album singles / *BigTop **Mala ***Atila
1964	"Rene" *** b/w "Saga of the Beatles"	—	—	—	—	—	—	—	—	—	Non-album singles / *BigTop **Mala ***Atila
1965	"I Love You" *** b/w "Judy's Moody"	—	—	—	—	—	—	—	—	—	Non-album singles / *BigTop **Mala ***Atila
1966	"Wisdom's Fifth Take" *** b/w "Because I Love Her"	—	—	—	—	—	—	—	—	—	Non-album singles / *BigTop **Mala ***Atila
1967	"The Psychedelic Worm" *** b/w "Red River Rock '67"	—	—	—	—	—	—	—	—	—	Non-album singles / *BigTop **Mala ***Atila
1968	"What You Know About Love" *** b/w "Yes It's You"	—	—	—	—	—	—	—	—	—	Non-album singles / *BigTop **Mala ***Atila
"—" denotes releases that did not chart or were not released in that territory.
