= Harry Balk =

- Also known as: Tom King
- Born: October 1, 1925; Detroit, Michigan, U.S.
- Died: December 3, 2016 (aged 91) Oak Park, Michigan, U.S.
- Occupations: Record producer, a&r, music business executive
- Years active: Late 1940s–2016
- Labels: Twirl, Impact, Inferno, Rare Earth

Harry Balk (October 1, 1925 – December 3, 2016) was an American A&R man, record producer and record label executive. He discovered Little Willie John, Johnny and the Hurricanes, and Rodriguez; co-produced Del Shannon's 1961 hit "Runaway"; established several record labels; and became head of A&R at Motown where he was particularly influential on the career of Marvin Gaye.

== Biography ==
The son of Russian Jewish immigrants, Balk was born in the 12th Street area of Detroit, Michigan. As a young man he managed the Krim Theatre, owned by his uncle, and began running talent contests through which he discovered Little Willie John in the early 1950s. Balk became his manager, and guided John to a successful career with such songs as "Need Your Love So Bad" and "Fever" before eventually tiring of his unreliability.

Balk then established a business partnership with former furrier Irving Micahnik (1905–1978), and the pair set up Embee Productions (upstairs in the Carmen Theatre building at 5760 Schaefer Rd., Dearborn, MI 48126) and Twirl Records in 1959. They signed Johnny and the Hurricanes, and produced several of their recordings including "Red River Rock". The band specialized in reworking out-of-copyright traditional tunes, on which Balk acquired co-writing credits under the name Tom King, with Micahnik co-credited as Ira Mack. Balk and Micahnik leased many of their recordings to other labels, including Warwick and later Big Top. The pair also produced Del Shannon's hit "Runaway" and its follow-up "Hats Off to Larry", as well as "What's Your Name", a top ten hit for Don and Juan. Balk and Michanik retained control over their leased master recordings, effectively becoming the first successful independent producers. A long running legal dispute between Shannon and Embee led to Shannon being unable to release recordings for several years.

After Twirl Records folded in 1965, Balk set up the Impact label, and a publishing company, Gomba. One of the acts on Impact was the Shades of Blue, who had chart success in 1966 with "Oh How Happy" (number 12 pop, number 16 R&B), "Lonely Summer", and "Happiness". Balk also signed and recorded singer-songwriter Sixto Rodriguez, whose later recordings (as Rodriguez) became popular in South Africa and decades later resulted in the award-winning film Searching for Sugar Man.

Balk then established another label, Inferno, which was bought in 1968 by Berry Gordy at Motown. Balk joined Motown as head of A&R, and was given responsibility for setting up a new subsidiary label which would add rock music acts to the Motown roster. He found a Detroit band, the Sunliners, renamed them as Rare Earth, and set up the Rare Earth label. One of the first white bands to be signed by Motown, they had several hits including a rock version of "Get Ready", and "I Just Want to Celebrate". Other artists who recorded for the Rare Earth label included R. Dean Taylor, Meat Loaf, and Kiki Dee.

In 1970, Balk heard Marvin Gaye's first demo recording of the song "What's Going On". Though Berry Gordy disliked the song, Balk pushed hard for it to be finished and released. When issued in 1971, the track rose to number 1 on the R&B chart and prompted the recording of Gaye's groundbreaking album of the same name. Balk remained with Motown until about 1977.

In 1978, Harry Balk again made history as the Creative Consultant to Producer Michael Robert Phillips during the recording of the album A Tribute to Ethel Waters featuring Diahann Carroll with the Duke Ellington Orchestra under the direction of Mercer Ellington, which was the first released commercial Digital Recording in the United States.

Balk later lived in California, where he set up another record label, Avatar, before returning to Detroit in later life. He was married to singer and actress Patti Jerome. He died in 2016 at aged 91 in Oak Park, Michigan.
