= Black List (Alex Chilton album) =

EP by Alex Chilton
- Released: 1990
- Genre: Rock
- Length: 21:19
- Label: New Rose Records
- Producer: Alex Chilton

Alex Chilton chronology
High Priest (1987)	Black List (1990)	Clichés (1994)

Professional ratings
Review scores
Source	Rating
AllMusic	3/5 stars
Robert Christgau	(2-star Honorable Mention)
The Encyclopedia of Popular Music	3/5 stars
The New Rolling Stone Album Guide	4/5 stars

Black List is an EP by the American pop rock musician Alex Chilton, released in 1990. The EP includes three Chilton originals and three cover versions. These are a cover of Ronny & the Daytonas' "Little G.T.O." on which Chilton played all the instruments; a version of Frank Sinatra's "Nice 'n' Easy", and a song penned by country blues musician Furry Lewis.

Black List was re-released in 1994 on a compilation CD together with Chilton's High Priest album, on Razor & Tie Records.

== Track listing ==
1. "Little G.T.O." (John Buck Wilkin) – 2:52
2. "Guantanamerika" (Alex Chilton) – 3:11
3. "Jailbait" (Chilton) – 3:31
4. "Baby Baby Baby" (Chilton) – 4:22
5. "Nice and Easy Does It" (Alan Bergman, Marilyn Keith, Lew Spence) – 4:36
6. "I Will Turn Your Money Green" (Furry Lewis, Traditional) – 2:53

== Personnel ==
- Alex Chilton – guitar, vocals; bass guitar, drums on track 1
- Tommy McClure – bass guitar
- Doug Garrison – drums
- Jim Spake – saxophone
- George Reineke – backing vocals on track 1
- Recorded at Ardent Studios, Memphis, Tennessee
- Engineered by Tom Laune
- Sleeve design by Huart/Cholley
- Photography by Alain Duplantier
