= GTO (Ronny & the Daytonas song) =

1964 single

Single by Ronny & the Daytonas

from the album G.T.O.
- B-side: "Hot Rod Baby"
- Released: 1964
- Recorded: 1964
- Studio: Phillips Recording, Memphis, Tennessee
- Genre: Rock and roll
- Length: 2:26
- Label: Mala
- Songwriter: John "Bucky" Wilkin
- Producer: Bill Justis

Ronny & the Daytonas singles chronology
"GTO" (1964)	"California Bound" (1964)

"GTO" is a song written by John Buck Wilkin and first recorded as the 1964 debut single of his band, Ronny & the Daytonas. It was also featured on their album of the same name. The single reached number four on the Billboard Hot 100 chart on September 26, 1964, and sold over one million copies, which resulted in it being awarded a gold disc. The song reached number seven in Canada. The song peaked at #4 on the New Zealand Lever Hit Parade chart It was produced by Bill Justis. The song's lyrics extol the performance of the Pontiac GTO and express the singer's desire to purchase that particular car.
