= I Will Turn Your Money Green =

"I Will Turn Your Money Green" (sometimes credited as "Turn Your Money Green") is an American blues song first recorded in 1928 by the author, Memphis bluesman Furry Lewis. It was a standard for Lewis' performances, and has been recorded by bands in the British rock scene of the 1960s and 1970s, and also by American blues performers.

Richard Fariña's 1966 novel, Been Down So Long It Looks Like Up to Me, took its title from a line in the song.

== Recordings ==
- Richard Fariña and Eric Von Schmidt on Dick Fariña & Eric Von Schmidt (1963) (rewritten as "Stick With Me, Baby")
- Tom Rush, on Take a Little Walk With Me (1966)
- Pentangle on Sweet Child (1968)
- Aliotta Haynes Jeremiah on Aliotta Haynes Music (1970) (as "Rockefeller's Blues")
- Stefan Grossman on My Creole Belle (1976)
- Alex Chilton, on his Black List EP (1989)
- Michael Roach on The Blinds of Life (1997)
- Jerry Ricks, on Many Miles of Blues (2000)
- Alice Stuart, on All the Good Times (1964)
- Rory Block, on Country Blues Guitar: Rare Archival Recording 1963-1971 (2008) (instrumental)
