= What's your sign? =

"What's your sign?" is a phrase used to ask about someone's astrological sign. It is also considered a cliched pick-up line.

"What's Your Sign?" (or variations) may also refer to:

== Music ==
- "What's Your Sign? (song)," 1998 single by Des'ree
- "What's Your Sign?" a song on the 1975 Harry Nilsson album Duit on Mon Dei
- "What's Your Sign Girl," a song on the 1995 Alex Chilton album A Man Called Destruction

== Film and television ==
- What's Your Sign? (1975 film), an Italian comedy film by Sergio Corbucci
- What's Your Sign? (2014 film), an Italian comedy film by Neri Parenti
- What's Your Raashee?, or What's Your Sign?, a 2009 Indian film by Ashutosh Gowariker
- "What's Your Sign?", an episode of the television series Project Runaway

== See also ==
- "No Matter What Sign You Are", a Diana Ross single
