= Brian Bahe =

Brian Bahe is a Native American (Navajo, Tohono Oʼodham, Hopi) stand-up comedian, actor and writer. Bahe was named as one of Vulture's 2023 "The Comedians You Should and Will Know." He was one of the Just For Laughs Comedy Festival "New Faces of Comedy" showcase in 2022. He is a writer for the CBS comedy series, Ghosts.

== Early life and education ==
Bahe was raised in Phoenix, Arizona. Bahe grew up Catholic. His father is Navajo and his mother is Hopi and Tohono O’odham. His father was a sheet-metal construction worker and his mother worked as a social services representative for the Bureau of Indian Affairs. Bahe went to University of Arizona, and graduated with degrees in English and Psychology.

== Career ==
While doing stand-up in New York, Bahe had several dayjobs, including working for a nonprofit.

In 2022, Bahe became a writer for the animated series The Great North. His pilot, Decolonize, was selected for the 2022 Indigenous List, representing Native creatives in the film and television industry, a collaboration between IllumiNative, The Black List and Sundance Institute. He taped a Comedy Central Stand-Up Featuring... that same year.

Bahe has written essays for McSweeney's, Medium, and CNN. Since August 2024, Bahe has been the co-host of the podcast, Sage-Based Wisdom with Jana Schmieding.

== Personal life ==
Bahe identifies as gay. He is based in Los Angeles.

== External resources ==
- Brian Bahe website
