= Blacklist (disambiguation) =

Blacklisting is the process of listing entities who are being denied a particular privilege or service.

Blacklist, black list, blacklisting or blacklisted may also refer to:

== Exclusion list ==
- Blacklist (computing), blacklisting usages in computers
  - Software blacklist, used by some digital rights management software
- Blacklist (employment), a list of people not to be employed
  - Hollywood blacklist, one of the most infamous employment blacklists, from the McCarthy era
- NHS treatments blacklist, a list of medicines that are not allowed to be prescribed on an NHS prescription in the UK

== Arts, entertainment, and media ==
=== Films and television ===
- The Blacklist, a 2013 American television series starring James Spader and Megan Boone
  - The Blacklist: Redemption, a 2017 spin-off
- Blacklist (Thai TV series), a 2019 Thai television series
- Black List (1972 film), a Hong Kong film
- Black List (1995 film), a Canadian film directed by Jean-Marc Vallée
- The Black List (film series), a series of documentary films by Timothy Greenfield-Sanders and Elvis Mitchell
- The Blacklist (film), a 1916 American drama silent film
- The Black List (survey), an annual survey of development executives, ranking the "most-liked" motion picture screenplays not yet produced

=== Literature ===
- Black List, a 2012 novel by Brad Thor
- Blacklist (novel), a 2003 mystery novel by Sara Paretsky

=== Music ===
==== Groups and labels ====
- Blacklist (band), a rock band from Brooklyn
- Blacklisted (band), a hardcore punk band from Philadelphia
- The Blacklist (band), an Australian rock band

==== Albums ====
- Black List (Alex Chilton album), 1990
- Black List (L.A. Guns album), 2005
- Blacklist (EP), by Come and Rest, 2015
- Blacklisted (Neko Case album), 2002
- Blacklisted (Aaron Carter album), 2022

==== Songs ====
- "Blacklist", a song by Bring Me the Horizon from There Is a Hell Believe Me I've Seen It. There Is a Heaven Let's Keep It a Secret.
- "Blacklist", a song by The Legendary Pink Dots
- "Blacklist", a song by Ronnie Radke featuring b.LaY
- "Blacklist', a song by Exodus from Tempo of the Damned

=== Video games ===
- Black List, a competing team in Crossfire
- Tom Clancy's Splinter Cell: Blacklist, a 2013 stealth action-adventure video game from Ubisoft

== Other uses ==
- Operation Blacklist, a codename for the occupation of Japan by the Allied Powers at the end of World War II

== See also ==
- Black Book (gambling)
