= High Priest (album) =

Studio album by Alex Chilton
- Released: 1987
- Recorded: February – March 1987
- Genre: Rock
- Length: 39:13; 54:01 with bonus tracks
- Label: Big Time
- Producer: Alex Chilton

Alex Chilton chronology
Bach's Bottom (1981)	High Priest (1987)	Clichés (1993)

High Priest is the third solo album by American pop rock musician Alex Chilton, released in 1987. It was his first full-length album since 1979's commercially disastrous Like Flies on Sherbert. Chilton fronts a solid band of Memphis/New Orleans studio musicians. The album includes a cover of the 1957 instrumental "Raunchy", which was co-written by Sid Manker, who had taught Chilton guitar in his childhood at his father's expense. To promote High Priest, Chilton played more than 60 concerts between 13 September and 19 December 1987, including numerous shows with Ben Vaughn as the support act. The front cover photograph was taken in Rock River, Wyoming, by Anna Lee Van Cleef.

== Track listing ==
Side 1

1. "Take It Off" (Eve Darby) – 2:56
2. "Let Me Get Close To You" (Carole King, Gerry Goffin) – 2:39
3. "Dalai Lama" (Alex Chilton) – 5:15
4. "Volaré" (Domenico Modugno, Franco Migliacci) – 3:00
5. "Thing for You" (Alex Chilton, Rick Davies) – 3:16
6. "Forbidden Love" (Alex Chilton) – 2:44

Side 2

1. "Make a Little Love" (Jimmy Holiday, Mike Akopoff) – 3:30
2. "Trouble Don't Last" (Eddie "Guitar Slim" Jones) – 3:17
3. "Don't Be a Drag" (Alex Chilton) – 3:29
4. "Nobody's Fool" (Buddy Emmons, Dan Penn) – 3:12
5. "Come By Here" (Alvis Armstrong) – 3:41
6. "Raunchy" (Bill Justis, Sid Manker) – 2:14

=== CD bonus tracks ===
1. "Junkyard" (Alex Chilton) – 3:51
2. "Lonely Weekends" (Charlie Rich) – 3:14
3. "Margie" (Con Conrad, J. Russel Robinson) – 2:19
4. "Rubber Room" (Porter Wagoner) – 5:20

== Personnel ==
- Alex Chilton – vocals, guitar, piano
- Ron Easley, George Reinecke – guitar
- René Coman, Sam Sharpe – bass
- Doug Garrison – drums
- Jim Spake – tenor saxophone
- Fred Ford – baritone saxophone
- Nokie Taylor – trumpet
- Jim Dickinson – piano on "Trouble Don't Last"
- Lorette Velvette, René Coman, Wayne Jackson – voices
- Mark Culp, Tom Laune – engineers
