= The Emperors =

American soul band

- Origin: Harrisburg, Pennsylvania, United States
- Genre: Soul
- Years active: 1960s
- Labels: Mala, Brunswick, Penniman Records, Soulville Records
- Past members: Donald Brantley; Milton Brown; Bobby Fulton; Jim Jackson; Edgar Moore; Tyrone Moss; David Peterson

The Emperors (also billed as The Emperor's) were an American soul band from Harrisburg, Pennsylvania, formed in the early 1960s.

The group had its first breakthrough when producer Phil Gaber noticed the group and recorded their first single, "Karate", in 1966. The song was released on Mala Records and became a hit; the song was a regional smash in the Philadelphia area, reached the Top 30 of the national R&B charts, peaked at #55 on the Billboard Hot 100, and reached #46 in Canada. Their follow-up single was a cover of Don Gardner's tune "My Baby Likes to Boogaloo", and another single, "Searchin'", followed in 1967 before the group signed with Brunswick Records. One single, "Karate Boogaloo", followed on the label before Bobby Fulton left the group to start Soulville Records. The group then renamed itself Emperors Soul 69 and recorded the single "Bring Out Yourself" for Futura Records before disbanding.

The group's output was reissued on LP and CD in 2002.

== Members ==
- Danny Sullivan on B-3 organ with double stack Leslie speaker?
- James Jackson
- Donald Brantley
- Bobby Fulton
- Edgar Moore
- David Peterson
- Billy Green
- Tyrone Moss
- Milton Brown Jr.
- Steve Stephens
- Ronnie Burnett
- Dred”Perky” Scott
