= In Search of Food, Clothing, Shelter and Sex =

Studio album by John Buck Wilkin
- Released: June 1970
- Studio: Muscle Shoals, Sheffield, Alabama
- Genre: Pop rock
- Length: 32:12
- Label: Liberty Records
- Producer: Don Tweedy

John Buck Wilkin chronology
In Search of Food, Clothing, Shelter and Sex (1970)	Buck Wilkin (1971)

In Search of Food, Clothing, Shelter and Sex is the debut solo album by American singer-songwriter John Buck Wilkin, released on Liberty Records in June 1970. The collection of songs includes compositions penned by Wilkin, covers, and a song co-written with Kris Kristofferson. The release received scarce reviews that mostly favored Wilkin.

== Content ==
The album was produced by Don Tweedy and recorded at Muscle Shoals. Wilkin's original songs, as well as the artwork on the album, were inspired by his own life: Pictures inside the jacket show Wilkin looking at photographs of his mother, Marijohn, while the songs discuss his path from childhood to his teenage years in Nashville to adulthood in Los Angeles. The album features a version of Kris Kristofferson's "Me and Bobby McGee" released before Janis Joplin's hit single, as well as a song co-written with Kirstofferson, "Apocalypse 1969".

== Release and reception ==
The album's lead-off single was released in May 1970 and featured "Apartment Twenty-One" backed with "Boy of the Country". The album was released by Liberty Records in June 1970.

The New Yorker deemed the album "very, very good", with reviewer Julie Baumgold noting that Wilkin's lyrics were not "the usual windmills-caverns-and-canyons-of-the-mind acidosis emptiness". The Honolulu Advertiser deemed the collection of songs a "lively outing". The Omaha World-Herald carried a positive review with the writer praising Wilkin's "biographical tunes and his easy going style" in which the artist "relies equally on rock and country roots". The Casper Star-Tribune review remarked on the large amount of session musicians appearing on the album, and that the 50 musicians accounted for "the polished instrumental excellence" of the release that made it "very clearly above average in content". The Winston-Salem Journal favored the album for the biographical nature of the songs, and deemed Wilkin's experience as "sharable". A later review by Allmusic gave the release three stars out of five, with music critic Richie Unterberger saying that the mixture of folk-rock, pop and country made it "rather strange, and not always comfortable", while he called it an "obscure solo album".

In the underground newspaper East Village Other, the reviewer considered the arrangements "tastefully done". The California State University, Los Angeles student newspaper College Times praised Wilkin's songwriting as "full of gentle images and subtle shadings". Meanwhile, their reviewer mentioned that the artist's "sensitive" voice "captures the beauty of human relationships". The College Times reviewer heavily criticized the instrumentation on the album, however, defining it as "totally out of step", adding that "horns and violins come in at the wrong places" and that the release was an example of "how production executives can spoil a very simple and beautiful product".

In 2016, the Big Pink label released a remastered version of the album in South Korea and Japan.

== Track listing ==
All tracks are written by John Buck Wilkin, except where noted:

Side one
No.	Title	Length
1.	"Apartment Twenty-One"	2:45
2.	"Faces And Places" (Jane Leichardt)	3:05
3.	"My God And I"	4:05
4.	"Boy Of The Country"	3:43
5.	"Apocalypse 1969" (co-written with Kris Kristofferson)	4:47

Side two
No.	Title	Length
1.	"Me And Bobby McGee" (Kris Kristofferson, Fred Foster)	4:47
2.	"The Daydream"	5:17
3.	"Mary Jackson"	2:34
4.	"Medley: Long Black Veil / The Nashville Sun" (Danny Dill, Marijohn Wilkin / John Buck Wilkin)	3:58
5.	"Medley: About Time / Nashville Sun Reprise"	2:06
