= Loose Shoes and Tight Pussy =

Studio album by Alex Chilton
- Released: 1999; February 22, 2000 (USA)
- Recorded: February 21, 1999
- Studios: Sear Sound, New York City
- Genres: Rock, jazz, soul, blues
- Length: 41:16
- Labels: Last Call; Bar/None
- Producer: Alex Chilton

Alex Chilton chronology
A Man Called Destruction (1995)	Loose Shoes and Tight Pussy (1999)

Alternative cover
- Cover of the US release

Professional ratings
Review scores
Source	Rating
AllMusic	2.5/5 stars
The Encyclopedia of Popular Music	2/5 stars
NME	3/5 stars

Loose Shoes and Tight Pussy is the last studio album by American pop-rock musician Alex Chilton, released in Europe in 1999. It was released in the United States in 2000 under the title Set. It was subsequently released on a double CD with one of Chilton's previous albums, Clichés.

The album is made up of cover versions of older songs, some of which have been recorded by several other artists.

== Track listing ==
1. "I've Never Found a Girl" (Booker T. Jones, Eddie Floyd, Alvertis Isbell) – 3:45
2. "Lipstick Traces" (Naomi Neville) – 3:27
3. "Hook Me Up" (Johnny "Guitar" Watson) – 4:16
4. "The Oogum Boogum Song" (Alfred J. Smith) – 3:26
5. "If You's a Viper" (Leroy Smith) – 2:16
6. "I Remember Mama" (Shirley Caesar, Michael Mathis, Bernard Sterling, Dottie Sterling, Ann Price, Mae Newton) – 3:46
7. "April in Paris" (E. Y. Harburg, Vernon Duke) – 3:29
8. "There Will Never Be Another You" (Mack Gordon, Harry Warren) – 2:18
9. "Single Again" (Gary Stewart) – 2:55
10. "You've Got a Booger Bear Under There" (Ollie Hoskins, Quinn Golden) – 4:39
11. "Shiny Stockings" (Frank Foster) – 4:03
12. "Goodnight My Love" (John Marascalco, George Motola) – 2:55

== Personnel ==
- Alex Chilton – guitar, vocals
- Ron Easley – bass guitar, backing vocals
- Richard Dworkin – drums
- Recorded at Sear Sound, New York City
- Engineered by Tom Schick
- Assisted by Todd Parker
- Mixed at Ardent Studios, Memphis, Tennessee, in June 1999
- Mélange auteur – Don Bell
- Mix and overdub engineer – Pete Matthews
- Sleeve design by Louis Sutter
- Photography by Vincent Lignier
