= Bach's Bottom =

Studio album by Alex Chilton
- Released: 1981
- Recorded: September–October 1975
- Studios: Ardent, Memphis, Tennessee
- Genre: Rock
- Length: 29:42
- Label: Line
- Producer: Jon Tiven

Alex Chilton chronology
Like Flies on Sherbert (1979)	Bach's Bottom (1981)	High Priest (1987)

Bach's Bottom is the second solo album by American pop rock musician Alex Chilton, released in 1981. Bach's Bottom was recorded in September and October 1975 at Ardent Studios in Memphis, Tennessee.

== Production ==
The album was produced by Jon Tiven, who also played guitar in place of Chilton. The album title is a play on both the Box Tops and the phrase "rock bottom."

== Critical reception ==
Professional ratings
Review scores
Source	Rating
AllMusic	2.5/5 stars
Robert Christgau	B+
The Encyclopedia of Popular Music	3/5 stars
MusicHound Rock: The Essential Album Guide	3/5 stars
Orlando Sentinel	5/5 stars
(The New) Rolling Stone Album Guide	4/5 stars
Spin Alternative Record Guide	7/10

The Orlando Sentinel wrote that "nothing is pretty on Bach's Bottom, but it's all beautiful in a scary, decrepit sort of way." The Spin Alternative Record Guide deemed the album a "major 'lost'-era work." Stereo Review called it an "unholy mess of an album," writing that "if you like Chilton at his most ludicrously dissolute, you'll be glad to have it."

== Track listing ==
Side 1

1. "Take Me Home and Make Me Like It" (Alex Chilton, Benny Davis, Danny Graflund, Grover DeLuca, Jon Tiven) – 2:32
2. "Everytime I Close My Eyes" (Jon Tiven) – 1:47
3. "All of the Time" (Alex Chilton, Lesa Aldridge) – 2:42
4. "Oh Baby I'm Free (Part 1 & 2)" (Alex Chilton, Jon Tiven) – 6:22
5. "I'm So Tired (Part 1 & 2)" (John Lennon, Paul McCartney) – 3:12

Side 2

1. "Free Again" (Alex Chilton) – 2:20
2. "Jesus Christ" (Alex Chilton) – 2:18
3. "Singer Not the Song" (Mick Jagger, Keith Richards) – 2:02
4. "Summertime Blues" (Eddie Cochran, Jerry Capehart) – 2:35
5. "Take Me Home Again (Part 1 & 2)" (Alex Chilton, Danny Graflund, Jon Tiven) – 3:52

== Personnel ==
- Alex Chilton – vocals, piano, backing vocals
- Ken Woodley – bass
- John Lightman – bass
- Jonathan Sanborn – bass on "Take Me Home and Make Me Like It (Version 1)" and "I'm So Tired"
- Rick Clarke – bass, piano, backing vocals
- Chris Bell – guitar, timbales on "All of The Time"
- Richard Rosebrough – drums, engineer
- Jon Tiven – acoustic and electric guitar, slide guitar, backing vocals, percussion, producer
- Andy Hummel – organ
- David Beaver – organ, clavinet
- Tommy Hoehn – piano, backing vocals
- The Bad Acoustics (Dave Rave, Lauren Agnelli, Gary Pig Gold), Andrew Loog Oldham – additional backing vocals
