= Cristina Black =

American musician and writer

- Born: Pittsburgh, Pennsylvania, United States
- Genres: Pop
- Occupations: Singer-songwriter, musician, journalist
- Instruments: Vocals, harp, baritone ukulele, piano
- Years active: 2010–present
- Website: www.cristinablack.com

Cristina Black (often misspelled "Christina Black" is an American musician and writer. She regularly contributes to a number of publications in New York and Los Angeles. Her first album, The Ditty Sessions, was released in 2010 and her music has been featured on the TV series Parenthood. She collaborated with Big Star and Box Tops lead singer Alex Chilton, who made his last appearance on Black's EP The Ditty Sessions before his death.

== History ==
Cristina Black was raised in Pittsburgh, Pennsylvania and trained as a classical pianist and harpist. Black moved to New Orleans, a city that would inspire her later work. In the mid-2000s, she moved to New York City, where she learned how to play the baritone ukulele from Michael Leviton and took up songwriting. She is currently based in Los Angeles.

Black has written for The Village Voice, Nylon, Dazed & Confused, Time Out New York, LA Weekly and is a former Foam entertainment editor. Her articles profiled a wide range of musical artists, including Adele, Kendrick Lamar, Florence Welch, Fiest, Lykke Li, Jack White, Pink, Lionel Richie and Nick Cave.

As a musician, Black is compared to Nico for her vocals and Joni Mitchell for her songwriting. Black has collaborated with Galactic's Ben Ellman, singer-songwriter and regular on HBO's Treme Alex McMurray, Maelstrom Trio keyboardist Brian Coogan and late Box Tops and Big Star lead singer Alex Chilton. Black’s "Drunk Rich People" appeared on NBC's family drama Parenthood on season 2, episode 13, "Opening Night," which aired on January 18, 2011.

== Discography ==
=== EPs ===
Released on March 11, 2010, Black's first album, The Ditty Sessions, was recorded in September 2009 at Number C Studios in New Orleans, home of the funk band Galactic, while Trombone Shorty's album Backatown was being produced.

In addition to Black, musicians featured on The Ditty Sessions are Alex McMurray on guitar, Brian Coogan on piano, Wurlitzer and Hammond B3, and Alex Chilton on bass. Chilton's performance would be his last studio session before his passing on March 17, 2010. Ben Ellman engineered the tracks.

Some of the songs on the five-track EP were inspired by Hurricane Katrina. "It is safe to say this album would not exist had Hurricane Katrina not hit New Orleans. It wouldn’t have needed to," Black said.

- The Ditty Sessions (Cristina Black, 2010)

=== Singles ===
Black released the single "Summer’s Over" on August 2, 2013. The track was produced by Rob Laufer, who has worked with Fiona Apple and Frank Black.

"When I Think of Christmas" was released on November 21, 2011. It was produced by Lewis Pesacov, who worked on Best Coast's Crazy For You among others.

"Alvarado" was released on January 1, 2015. Produced by Lewis Pesacov

- When I Think of Christmas (White Iris Records, 2011)
- Summer's Over (Cristina Black, 2013)
- Alvarado (Cristina Black, 2015)

=== with Father John Misty ===
- Chloë and the Next 20th Century (Father John Misty, 2022)

(Black played harp on "Funny Girl," the album's lead single)
