= The Birdwatchers =

American garage rock/pop band

- Origin: Tampa, Florida, United States
- Genres: Garage rock; pop
- Years active: 1960s
- Labels: Mala, Laurie, Tara

The Birdwatchers were an American garage rock and pop band, active in the 1960s in the Tampa, Florida area. The band dabbled with an Everly Brothers sound in their early career (1964), releasing a cover version of "Wake Up Little Susie" on Tara, a local Florida based record label.

During 1966 and 1967, the band released five singles on the Mala and Laurie labels, in addition to local releases on the Tara, Marlin and Scott labels. Most of these featured the vocals of Sammy Hall.

Despite national TV exposure on teen shows such as Where The Action Is, the highest placing the band ever achieved on the charts was No. 125 on Billboard's Bubbling Under Charts in September 1966, with "I'm Gonna Love you Anyway". As evidence of their local popularity, another of their records ("Girl I Got News for You") made Billboard's Regional Breakout Charts for Miami, peaking at No. 3 locally in April 1966.

Sammy Hall (born Samuel Ray Hall on August 9, 1945) died of cancer on June 24, 2013, at age 67.
