= Been Down So Long It Looks Like Up to Me =

1966 novel by Richard Fariña

- First edition
- Author: Richard Fariña
- Published: April 28, 1966 (Random House)
- ISBN: 0-14-018930-0

Been Down So Long It Looks Like Up to Me is a novel by Richard Fariña. Parts campus novel and travelogue, the book was first published in 1966 and is largely based on Fariña's college experiences and travels. Set variously in an upstate New York college town, in Cuba during the Cuban Revolution, and in the Western United States, it is a comic picaresque story of the protagonist, Gnossos Pappadopoulis, a modern Odysseus who navigates the challenges of early adulthood via an array of hijinks, psychedelic experiences, and relationships with various women. The book has become something of a cult classic among those who study 1960s or counterculture literature, and has been cited as a source of inspiration for many artists ranging from Hunter S. Thompson to Earl Sweatshirt to the Doors' album L.A. Woman.

== Publication history ==
Fariña wrote the novel while a student at Cornell University in Ithaca, New York. The novel is laced with pseudonym references to Cornell University ("Mentor University") and Ithaca landmarks. Gnossos is a gleeful anarchist, heaving creche statuary off a bridge into one of Ithaca's famed gorges, smoking dope at fraternity parties, poking fun at the pompous, self-righteous and well-to-do, swilling Red Cap ale, retsina and martinis, while pursuing the coed in the green knee-socks and seeking karma. After a detour to Cuba during the anti-Batista revolt, Gnossos returns to "Athene" to become the inadvertent leader of the student rebellion against a university edict that would have banned women from men's apartments.

Fariña's agent, Robert Mills, began advertising it as a work-in-progress to several British publishers in 1963. It was eventually submitted to Random House and accepted by them in April 1965. Jim Silberman was the book's editor. Fariña was paid the advance fee of $5,400 (equivalent to $55,200 in 2025) and its release was announced for the autumn of 1965 but was rescheduled for the spring publishing season of April 1966. The title appears to come from a line in the 1928 blues song "I Will Turn Your Money Green", by Furry Lewis, which was included on records issued in 1953, 1959 and 1961. Fariña himself recorded a version of the song with Eric von Schmidt in 1963.

On April 30, 1966, two days after the publication of his book, Fariña attended a book-signing ceremony at a Carmel Valley Village bookstore, the Thunderbird (to be followed the next day by another at the Discovery Bookshop in San Francisco). Later that day, while at a party, he saw a guest with a motorcycle and went for a ride up Carmel Valley Road east toward Cachagua on the back of the motorcycle. At an S-turn—coincidentally, just above the place on the Carmel River where John Steinbeck set the frog hunt that the Cannery Row denizens perform in the novel Cannery Row—the driver lost control. The motorcycle flopped on one side on the right side of the road, came back to the other side and tore through a barbed wire fence into a field where there is now a small vineyard. The driver was seriously injured but survived. Fariña was killed instantly.

Thomas Pynchon, who was acquainted with Fariña while they attended Cornell University together, later dedicated his book Gravity's Rainbow (1973) to him and described Fariña's novel as "coming on like the Hallelujah Chorus done by 200 kazoo players with perfect pitch... hilarious, chilling, sexy, profound, maniacal, beautiful and outrageous all at the same time," in an introduction to the paperback version of Been Down....

== Adaptation ==
Paramount Pictures began filming a cinematic adaptation of Fariña's novel on May 25, 1970, with principal photography finished by late July. It was filmed on location at Allegheny College in Meadville, Pennsylvania. The film was directed by Jeffrey Young and featured Barry Primus (as Gnossos), Linda De Coff and David Downing. It did not receive good reviews and remains a difficult-to-find home video.
