= Little Caesar and the Consuls =

- Also known as: The Consuls
- Origin: Toronto, Ontario, Canada
- Genre: Rock
- Years active: 1956–1971; several reincarnations since 1973
- Labels: Columbia, Arc, Red Leaf, Mala
- Past members: Bruce Morshead; Ken Pernokis; Tom Wilson; Gary Wright; Norm Sherratt; Gene MacLellan; Robbie Robertson; Steve Macko; Vic Wilson; Peter DeRemigis; Wayne Connors; Paul Denyes; Tommy Graham; Mike Hollman; Sandy White; John Bradley; Bob Olliffe; Lenny Stubbs
- Website: www.littlecaesarmusic.com

Little Caesar and the Consuls is a Canadian rock band, originally active in and around Toronto from 1961 to 1971. The earliest tangible evidence of a group by that name is on February 11, 1961, when they played for the Downsview Junior Teen Club's Valentine Party at Beverley Heights Junior High School, as reported in the February 23, 1961, issue of the Weston, Ontario, Times & Guide.

Two members of Little Caesar and The Consuls, pianist and vocalist Bruce Morshead and saxophonist Norm Sherratt, had previously been part of a group named The Consuls after a popular automobile. In early 1959, disappointed with the lack of success and because Robbie Robertson refused to play bass, a role for which he had recently been hired, the five-piece Consuls disbanded. Robertson, guitarist and vocalist Gene MacLellan and drummer Peter DeRemigis promptly formed The Suedes, with Johnny Rhythm (real name, John Rutter) joining as a vocalist. Morshead returned to his full-time employment at the bank.

A year and a half later, Morshead and Sherratt (formerly known as Norm Parish) reunited and formed a new group called Little Caesar and The Consuls. The Little Caesar, part of the name was said to have been derived from a number of fans noting that Morshead resembled Edward G. Robinson in the film Little Caesar. The core of the group was pianist Morshead, guitarist Ken Pernokis, bassist Tom Wilson, drummer Gary Wright (who had replaced Wayne Connors in 1963) and saxophonist Norm Sherratt.

The group recorded several Canadian hits, including "If ... (I Found A New Girl)" and covers of "My Girl Sloopy" and "You Really Got a Hold On Me", which reached number one on the RPM charts in 1965, making them only the second Canadian group (after Chad Allan and the Expressions) to top that chart. Morshead and Wilson left the band in 1968. The band continued with new vocalist and keyboard player Steve Macko before breaking up in 1971.

There had been several incarnations of the group; reuniting in 1973, 1976, 1986, 1993, and 2003.

In 1993, Norm Sherratt, Tom Wilson, Steve Macko, Vic Wilson (saxophones), Tony Crivaro (vocals and guitar), and Gary Wright (drums) joined up and recorded a reunion album, Since 1956. Tom Wilson left the band in 2010. In later years, Norm Sherratt, Tony Crivaro, Sam Carothers (bass), Walter Taylor (keyboards), Sonny Milne (drums), and Doug Dixon (vocals and guitar) held forth at shows, adding Russ Strathdee on sax in 2013. Currently the line-up includes Walter Taylor (keyboards), James Legere (bass), Phil Strong (drums), and Russ Strathdee (sax), with Martin Damsell on lead vocals and guitar.

== Discography ==
=== Albums ===
- 1965 Little Caesar and the Consuls
- 1993 Since 1956

=== Singles ===
- 1963 "If ... (I Found A New Girl)" - (#7 CHUM Chart - October 1963)
- 1963 "Something's Funny, Something's Wrong"
- 1964 "Sea Cruise"
- 1964 "Heartaches"
- 1965 "(My Girl) Sloopy" - (#3 RPM - August 1965)
- 1965 "You Really Got a Hold On Me" - (#1 RPM - December 1965)
- 1966 "You Laugh Too Much" - (#9 RPM - April 1966)
- 1966 "A Thousand Miles Away" - (#58 RPM - July 1966)
- 1966 "Personality"
- 1966 "Mercy Mr. Percy" - (#38 RPM - December 1966)
- 1967 "My Love For You" - (#88 RPM - May 1967)
- 1976 "Hang On Sloopy"
