= Like Flies on Sherbert =

Studio album by Alex Chilton
- Released: 1979
- Recorded: 1978–79
- Genres: Experimental rock, lo-fi
- Length: 35:28 (Peabody); 29:11 (Aura)
- Labels: Peabody (1979), Aura (1980)
- Producers: Alex Chilton, Jim Dickinson

Alex Chilton chronology
Like Flies on Sherbert (1979)	Bach's Bottom (1981)

Like Flies on Sherbert is the first solo album released by American pop rock musician Alex Chilton. He had previously recorded a collection of songs in 1969 and 1970, ultimately titled 1970, but this was not released until 1996. Released in 1979, Like Flies on Sherbert was recorded at two Memphis studios, Phillips Recording and Ardent Studios, in 1978 and 1979. Chilton had previously been a member of the Box Tops and Big Star.

The album was originally released in fall 1979 in a batch of 500 copies by Peabody Records, a label run by Memphis singer and guitarist Sid Selvidge. Aura Records, a British label, put out a version that differed slightly from the original issue. A number of CD releases followed in the 1990s and 2000s, some with added bonus tracks. Selvidge's 1998 Peabody CD reissue collects all the tracks from the previous Peabody edition and the Aura reissue and adds three tracks: "Baby Doll," "She's the One That's Got It" and "Stranded on a Dateless Night."

The photograph used for the cover of the album was taken by noted American photographer William Eggleston, who had previously provided the cover for Big Star's second album Radio City.

== Recording ==
The songs on the album were either Chilton originals or obscure cover versions of songs by artists including KC and the Sunshine Band, The Bell Notes, Ernest Tubb and the Carter Family. Critic Robert Christgau described them as a "bag of wrecked covers and discarded originals". All were recorded with false starts and vocal and musical errors, either created by accident or on purpose. Producer Jim Dickinson later described the recording of "No More the Moon Shines on Lorena": "Sometimes there was somebody in the control room and a lot of times there was nobody there. The beginning of 'Lorena' where it's spoken, that was overdubbed because whoever started the machine didn’t start it soon enough." The musicians also sometimes used instruments that were not fully functioning, as Dickinson explained: "The Minimoog was sitting around broken at [the studio]. I played it and all I did was twist knobs."

Chilton later said that when the recording sessions began, he began to think, "'Man these guys don't know the songs...this must sound terrible'. But when I went in the control room and heard what we’d been doing, it was just incredible sounding. Getting involved with Dickinson opened up a new world for me. Before that I'd been into careful layerings of guitars and voices and harmonies and things like that, and Dickinson showed me how to go into the studio and just create a wild mess and make it sound really crazy and anarchic. That was a growth for me."

Dickinson affirmed that Chilton consciously wanted the musicianship to be sloppy. He clarified that he plays guitar on the album despite not being technically proficient: "A lot of the guitar on Sherbert is me. Alex said, 'You still play like you’re 14 years old.' I said, 'Yeah, I play bad.' That's what he wanted."

Years later, for Robert Gordon's book on the Memphis music scene, It Came from Memphis, Chilton stated, "My life was on the skids, and Like Flies on Sherbert was a summation of that period. I like that record a lot. It's crazy but it’s a positive statement about a period in my life that wasn’t positive."

== Critical reception ==
Professional ratings
Review scores
Source	Rating
AllMusic	link
Robert Christgau	B
Tiny Mix Tapes	(Favorable) link
The Rolling Stone Album Guide	4/5 stars

With its deliberately below-par sound quality and performances, reviews of Like Flies on Sherbert differ as to whether the effect is positive or merely substandard. Allmusic's David Cleary noted that "sound quality is terrible, instrumental balances are careless and haphazard, and some selections even begin with recording start-up sound." and described the album as "universally slipshod and boorish...sloppy and lackluster."

Another AllMusic critic, Stephen Thomas Erlewine, claimed the album was "a front-runner for the worst album ever made." However, more recently, AllMusic critic Steve Leggett revisited the album and gave it a three-and-a-half-star review, saying, "In retrospect, Flies isn't quite the car wreck it once appeared to be."

Rolling Stone's Ken Tucker described the album as "a small masterpiece of crudity and split-second invention", adding that "Chilton achieves his most startling, moving effects at precisely those moments when he seems least in control." Critic Robert Christgau stated that "this long-time advertisement for self-abuse doesn't prove craziness is universal. Just makes you forget that things most certainly wouldn't be more fun if it was."

It also received positive reviews in Sounds and was a featured release in Creem.

== Track listing ==
=== LP (Peabody version) ===
==== Side 1 ====
1. "Baron of Love, Pt. II" (Ross Johnson) – 4:11
2. "Girl After Girl" (Gary Shelton) – 2:28
3. "My Rival" (Alex Chilton) – 3:27
4. "No More the Moon Shines on Lorena" (A. P. Carter) – 4:35
5. "I've Had It" (Ray Ceroni, Carl Bonura) – 2:23

==== Side 2 ====
1. "Rock Hard" (Chilton) – 2:42
2. "Waltz Across Texas" (Ernest Tubb) – 4:46
3. "Alligator Man" (Floyd Chance, Jimmy C. Newman) – 2:40
4. "Hey! Little Child" (Chilton) – 3:43
5. "Hook or Crook" (Chilton) – 2:25
6. "Like Flies on Sherbert" (Chilton) – 2:08

=== LP (Aura version) ===
==== Side 1 ====
1. "Boogie Shoes" (Harry Wayne Casey, Richard Finch) – 2:29
2. "My Rival" – 3:27
3. "Hey! Little Child" – 3:43
4. "Hook or Crook" – 2:25
5. "I've Had It" – 2:23

==== Side 2 ====
1. "Rock Hard" – 2:42
2. "Girl After Girl" – 2:28
3. "Waltz Across Texas" – 4:46
4. "Alligator Man" – 2:40
5. "Like Flies on Sherbert" – 2:08

=== CD re-release ===
1. "Baron of Love" (Ross Johnson) – 4:11
2. "Girl After Girl"
3. "My Rival"
4. "No More the Moon Shines on Lorena"
5. "I've Had It"
6. "Rock Hard"
7. "Waltz Across Texas"
8. "Alligator Man"
9. "Hey! Little Child"
10. "Hook or Crook"
11. "Like Flies on Sherbert"
12. "Boogie Shoes"
13. "Baby Doll" (Chilton) – 2:51
14. "She's the One That's Got It" (Allen Page) – 1:54
15. "Stranded on a Dateless Night" (Cordell Jackson) – 2:33

== Personnel ==
- Alex Chilton – guitar, vocals, piano
- Mike Ladd – guitar, drums
- Lee Baker – guitar
- Jim Lancaster – bass guitar
- Jim Dickinson – piano, keyboards, guitar
- Ross Johnson – drums, vocals
- Richard Rosebrough – drums
- Lesa Aldridge – backing vocals
- Sid Selvidge – backing vocals

Technical

- Alex Chilton, Richard Rosebrough, Pat Rainer, John Hampton - engineer, mixing
- Larry Nix - mastering
- William Eggleston - photography
- Gustavo Falco - titling
- Recorded at Sam Phillips Studios and Ardent Studios
