= Clichés (album) =

Studio album by Alex Chilton
- Released: 1993
- Recorded: Chez Flames, New Orleans
- Genre: Rock
- Length: 32:14
- Label: New Rose (France) (subsequently licensed to Ardent for U.S. release)
- Producer: Alex Chilton

Alex Chilton chronology
| High Priest (1987) | Clichés (1993) | A Man Called Destruction (1995) |

Clichés is the fourth solo album released by American pop rock musician Alex Chilton. It was recorded and released in 1993. Chilton recorded the album in New Orleans at Chez Flames, the recording studio of producer and recording engineer Keith Keller (who also wrote the song "Lies", featured on Chilton's subsequent album of rock-oriented covers and original songs, A Man Called Destruction).

In January 1992, Chilton was one of eight singer-songwriters (the others being Townes Van Zandt, Guy Clark, Eric Andersen, David Olney, Pat Mears, Paul K, and Tom Pacheco) who participated in a short tour of the Netherlands where each artist performed solo. For this series of concerts, Chilton performed much of the music that would be on his next album. He explained how the album came about to journalist Keith Spera in 1995:

It was something I really hadn’t done too much, but I sort of enjoy doing it. When I was putting together my repertoire for that, it seemed to me that the best thing I could do was to play these kind of jazzy things. Trying to be like a folk singer or sing country blues didn’t feel as right as doing this kind of jazzy thing.

So maybe a year later, the woman who had booked the tour over there was working with some record companies over there, and called me up and said she wanted me to make a solo record for this label she was working with. I thought about it for a couple of days, and thought about all of those tunes, and thought, “Yeah, I can flesh that into an album.” I ended up making it for this French company instead, New Rose, and then licensed it to Ardent after they had heard it and really dug it. It was proposed to me, and there was some money involved, and I said, “Well, I can use that money, and I think I can do a good record.”

So that’s how it came about....[Engineer and studio owner] Keith [Keller] was really kind of great about doing the record. I went in there thinking I was going to do it in one evening. But it’s so much harder to play on acoustic guitar than it is on electric. I wasn’t really in fighting form for that at all. I got in there, and after 45 minutes my hands were so fuckin’ sore, I could not go any further. He bore with me – we probably did 14 recording sessions to get 12 songs. He hung in there with me about it. I’m probably exaggerating about that, but it certainly wasn’t one evening like I envisioned.

== Release history ==
The album was initially released on CD in Europe by the French label New Rose Records in 1993, and the following year in the United States by the recently revived Ardent Records, Chilton's primary label based in Memphis and the home of his former band Big Star in the 1970s. It was also licensed to Century Records in Japan in 1994.

Clichés was reissued in France in 2004 by Last Call Records, on a two-for-one CD with Chilton's 1999 covers collection (and final studio album) Loose Shoes and Tight Pussy.

Bar/None Records issued a limited edition LP of Clichés, with new cover art, for Record Store Day in April 2024.

== Reception ==
Clichés has received generally favorable reviews since its initial release. In his AllMusic review, critic Mark Deming said of Chilton’s solo performances of pop standards: "[O]n this material his delivery is warm, easygoing, and straightforward, and he seems to genuinely enjoy himself in a way he hasn't on record since the first Big Star album." He also praises Chilton’s singing, "[d]espite the occasional rough moment in his vocals and guitar playing".

Professional ratings
Review scores
| Source | Rating |
|---|---|
| AllMusic | 3.5/5 stars |
| Chicago Tribune | 3/4 stars |
| Orlando Sentinel | 4/5 stars |
| The Rolling Stone Album Guide | 3/5 stars |

== Track listing ==
1. "My Baby Just Cares for Me" (Bergman, Vocco, Conn) – 3:44
2. "Time After Time" (Jule Styne, Sammy Cahn) – 2:36
3. "All of You" (Cole Porter) – 1:38
4. "Gavotte" (Johann Sebastian Bach) – 1:39
5. "Save Your Love for Me" (Buddy Johnson) – 2:49
6. "Let's Get Lost" (Frank Loesser, Jimmy McHugh) – 2:01
7. "Funny (But I Still Love You)" (Ray Charles) – 3:13
8. "Frame for the Blues" (Slide Hampton) – 3:34
9. "The Christmas Song" (Mel Tormé, Robert Wells) – 2:38
10. "There Will Never Be Another You" (Harry Warren, Mack Gordon) – 3:02
11. "Somewhere Along the Way" (Kurt Adams, Sammy Gallop) – 3:00
12. "What Was" (Ken Wannberg, Stephen Lehner) – 2:00
