= The Blacklist (band) =

Australian band

- Origin: Melbourne, Victoria, Australia
- Genres: Heavy metal, pub rock
- Years active: 2001–present
- Labels: International Trash, Spooky Records, Drug Bust Records
- Members: Ian Scott; Ben O'Dowd; Karl Shanley; Craig Bailey; Todd Trevor; Nic Gemmill

The Blacklist are an Australian hard and fast beer metal band formed in Melbourne in late 2001. The band features former members of the Sex Bombs, the Spoilers, the Demolitions and Warped. They play music similar to Motörhead, the Hookers, Venom and Zeke. Shortly after their debut album Electric & Evil was released in June 2004, the group added a third guitarist to their line-up. The group have toured Europe.

== History ==
The Blacklist formed in late 2001 with Nic "Goodtime" Gemmill on lead vocals (ex-Demolitions), T-Bone O'Fury (a.k.a. Ben O'Dowd) on bass guitar, The Jackal on guitar (both ex-the Sex Bombs), Ion Scatt the 1st (a.k.a. Ian Scott) on lead guitar and Skull Crak (a.k.a. Craig Bradley) on drums (both ex-the Spoilers). The Blacklist went into the studio in January 2002 to record their debut six-track extended play, Attacks (February 2002, International Trash) without having performed live. I-94 Bar's Simon Li described it "short, sharp, scorching and punishing punk rock-n-roll."

The Blacklist’s debut album, Electric and Evil Spooky Records, was recorded in September 2003 but was not released until June 2004. I-94 Bar's Patrick Emery felt it was "a brutal half-hour post-apocalyptic assault on the aural senses. The riffs are invigorating and powerful, the drumming frenetic, the atmosphere amphetamised." His fellow reviewer, Li opined that it "seems to be far and away the toughest, fastest, meanest and loudest album you will find this year." The group toured Europe and then Australia before it appeared. Late in 2004 Todd of Thunder (a.k.a. Todd Trevor, ex-Warped) joined as third lead guitarist.

The band undertook an extensive European tour in April and May 2005 that saw them perform in the Netherlands, Belgium, France, Germany and Slovenia.

The Blacklist completed work on their second album, Total Blacklist (Drug Bust Records), in 2007. The album was released in April 2008 and was featured in Blunt Magazine's Top 100 Albums of 2008. In August their tracks, "Alcohol" and "Drink Till I Die" were added to national radio station, Triple J's playlist.

The band was placed on indefinite hold after Goodtime Gemmill relocated to New Zealand in 2009. They returned to the stage in November 2014 to perform at the annual River Rocks Festival in Geelong and again in February 2015 as main support to Blood Duster at the Tote Hotel in Collingwood. Their last live appearance was in November 2017 when the band once again performed at Geelong's River Rocks Festival.

== Discography ==
- Attacks (EP, February 2002, International Trash)
- Electric and Evil (June 2004, Spooky Records)
- Total Blacklist (April 2008, Drug Bust Records)

== Members ==
- Goodtime Gemmill - Throat
- Ion Scatt the 1st - Axe
- Hott Todd of Thunder - Axe
- Man Manly - Axe
- T-Bone Endowd - Bass
- Dr No - Drums
