= Johnny and the Hurricanes =

American rock band

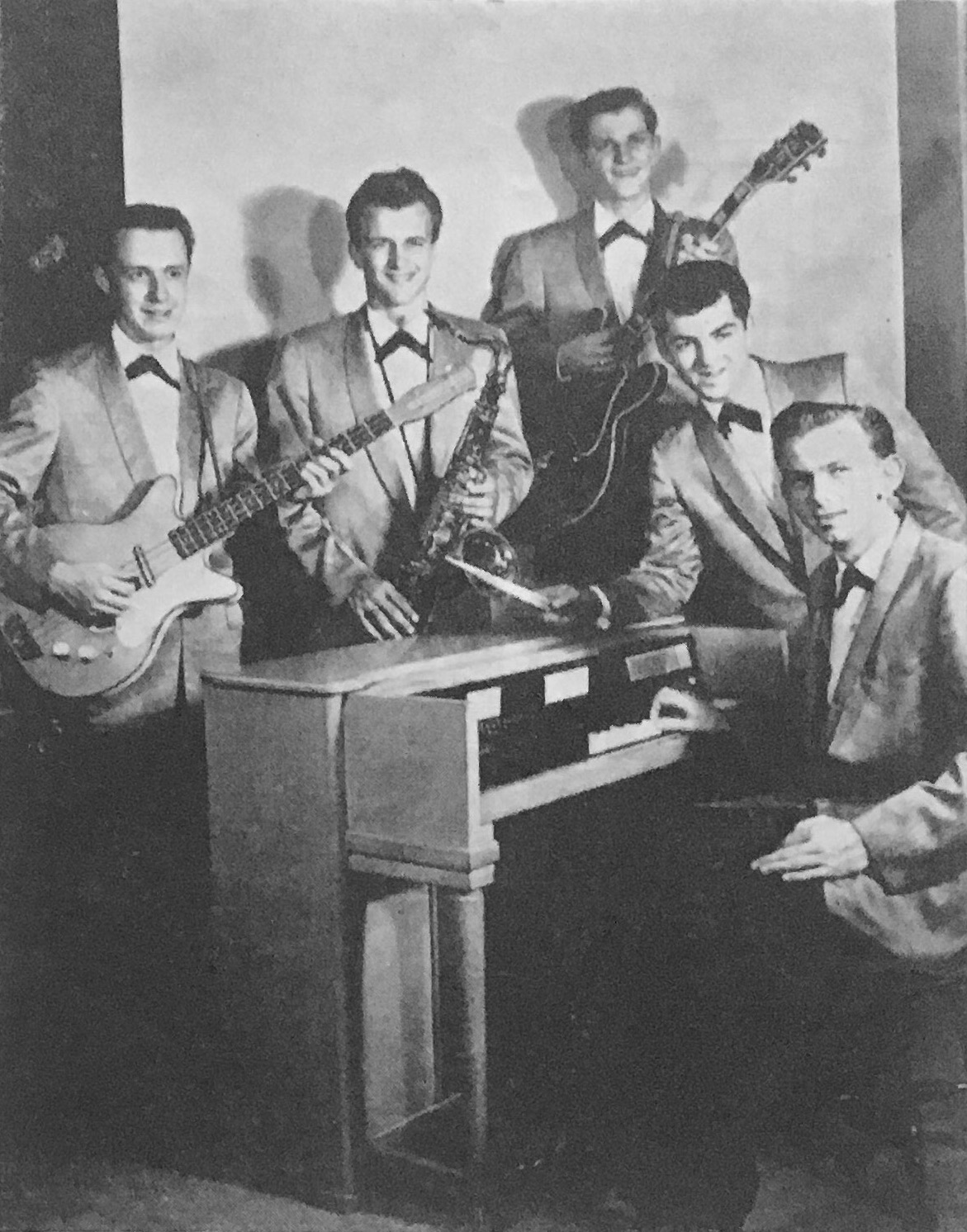
- Johnny and the Hurricanes in a 1960 advert for one of Lee Gordon's shows

Background information
- Origin: Toledo, Ohio, U.S.
- Genres: Instrumental rock
- Years active: 1957–2005
- Labels: Warwick, Bigtop, London, Mala
- Past members: Johnny Paris (John Pocisk); Paul Tesluk; Dave Yorko; Lionel "Butch" Mattice; Bill "Little Bo" Savich; Gerald "Jerry" Pynckel

Johnny and the Hurricanes was an American instrumental rock band from Toledo, Ohio, United States. They specialized in adapting popular traditional melodies into the rock idiom, using organ and saxophone as their featured instruments on their hits, and guitar lead on the B sides. Between 1958 and 1963, the group had a number of hits in both the US and the UK, and developed a following in Europe. In 1962, they played at the Star-Club in Hamburg, where the Beatles, then a little-known band, were an opening act. The band continued as a live act through 2005; leader Johnny Paris died in 2006.

== Career ==
They began as the Orbits in Toledo in 1957. Led by saxophonist Johnny Paris (born John Matthew Pocisk on August 29, 1940, in Walbridge, Ohio), they were school friends who played on a few recordings behind Mack Vickery, a local rockabilly singer. They signed with Harry Balk and Irving Micahnik of Twirl Records, which led to national engagements in 1958; at this point, they were renamed as Johnny and the Hurricanes. They then recorded "Crossfire", in a vacant cinema (the Carmen Theater on Schaefer Road in Dearborn, Michigan) to provide echo. It became a nationwide U.S. hit, and reached No. 23 on the US chart in the spring of 1959.

They followed with "Red River Rock", an instrumental version of "Red River Valley", on Warwick Records. It became a top ten hit on both sides of the Atlantic (No. 5 in the U.S., No. 3 in the UK), and sold over a million copies. The musicians in the band then were Johnny Paris (August 29 1940 - May 1 2006) on saxophone, Paul Tesluk (July 2, 1940 – August 20, 2022) on a Hammond Chord organ, Dave Yorko (June 15 1943 - February 17 2017) on guitar, Lionel "Butch" Mattice (February 19, 1939 – October 16, 2006) on bass, and Bill "Little Bo" Savich (August 2 1939 - January 4 2002) on drums.

They specialised in versions of old tunes with a rock and roll beat. They chose these songs because they were well recognized and easier to accept with the beat, as well as many were in public domain and the composer royalty could be paid to management people. Tunes were credited to 'King, Mack' and usually one other name: King and Mack were in fact pseudonyms for Harry Balk and Irving Micahnik, the band's managers. In 1960, they recorded the United States Army bugle call, "Reveille", as "Reveille Rock", and turned "Blue Tail Fly" into "Beatnik Fly". Both tunes made the Top 40 achieving number 25 and 15 respectively. The band also recorded "Down Yonder" for Big Top Records. In the same year, they recorded "When The Saints Go Marching In" as "Revival", but it ranked in the charts for just one week, peaking at No. 97. The record was flipped over in the UK, where "Rocking Goose" reached No. 3 in the UK Singles Chart.

The band developed a following in Europe. In 1962, they played at the Star-Club in Hamburg, where the Beatles, then a little-known band, served as an opening act. Johnny and the Hurricanes cut records until 1987, with "Old Smokie" (their cover of "On Top of Old Smokey"), and an original tune, "Traffic Jam", both on Big Top Records, being their last releases to chart in America. Johnny Paris, the only constant member of the band, continued to tour with his Hurricanes in Europe and the United States until his death. He had an uncle, a realtor, in Rossford, Ohio, Johnny's home town, who owned a building on the main street and offered Johnny's first wife, Sharon Venier-Pocisk, space for an antique shop. When not on the road he helped out with the antique shop and vending machine business as payment for the store front for his first wife.

Johnny Paris and his band toured Europe occasionally until the end of 2005. He died on May 1, 2006, at the University Clinic of Ann Arbor, Michigan, of hospital-borne infections after an operation. Paris's second wife and widow, the German journalist, novelist, and vocalist Sonja Verena (Reuter) Paris, took over his business (Atila Records, Sirius 1 Music, and Johnny and the Hurricanes Incorporated) and the rights to his songs and trademarks. Paris said that over 300 musicians played in the band in its fifty-year existence.

The band inspired the song "Johnny and the Hurricanes" on the album How I Learned to Love the Bootboys, by the band the Auteurs. They were also namechecked in the Kinks' 1973 song "One of the Survivors", and in "Bridge in Time" on the 1990 Burton Cummings album, Plus Signs.

== Deaths ==
Johnny Paris died on May 1, 2006, aged 65. Drummer Bill "Little Bo" Savich died on January 4, 2002, aged 61. Bassist Lionel "Butch" Mattice died on October 16, 2006, aged 67. Guitarist David Yorko died on February 17, 2017, at the age of 73. Keyboard player Paul Tesluk died on August 20, 2022, at the age of 82. Gerald "Jerry" Pynckel died on January 24, 2026, at the age of 83.

== Discography ==
=== Albums ===
- Johnny and the Hurricanes (Warwick Records, 1959)
- Stormsville (Warwick Records, 1960)
- The Big Sound of Johnny and the Hurricanes (Bigtop Records, 1960)

=== Singles ===
Year	A-side	B-side	Label
1958	"Crossfire"	"Lazy"	Warwick M502
1959	"Red River Rock"	"Buckeye"	Warwick M509
1959	"Reveille Rock"	"Time Bomb"	Warwick M513
1959	"Beatnik Fly"	"Sandstorm"	Warwick M520
1960	"Down Yonder"	"Sheba"	Big Top 45-3036
1960	"Rocking Goose"	"Revival"	Big Top 45-3051
1960	"You Are My Sunshine"	"Molly-O"	Big Top 45-3056
1961	"Ja-Da"	"Mr Lonely"	Big Top 45-3063
1961	"High Voltage"	"Old Smokie"	Big Top 45-3076
1961	"Farewell, Farewell"	"Traffic Jam"	Big Top 45-3090
1962	"Salvation"	"Miserlou"	Big Top 45-3103
1962	"San Antonio Rose"	"Come On Train"	Big Top 45-3113
1962	"Minnesota Fats"	"Sheik of Araby"	Big Top 45-3125
1963	"Whatever Happened to Baby Jane"	"Greens and Beans"	Big Top 45-3132
1963	"James Bond Theme"	"The Hungry Eye"	Big Top 45-3146
1963	"Rough Road"	"Kaw-Liga"	Big Top 45-3159
1963	"It's a Mad, Mad, Mad, Mad World"	"Shadows"	Mala 470
1964	"Money Honey"	"That's All"	Mala 483
1964	"Rene"	"Saga of The Beatles"	Atila A211
