= A Man Called Destruction =

Studio album by Alex Chilton
- Released: March 1995
- Genre: Rock
- Length: 37:00
- Label: Ardent
- Producer: Alex Chilton

Alex Chilton chronology
Clichés (1994)	A Man Called Destruction (1995)	Loose Shoes and Tight Pussy (1999)

A Man Called Destruction is a studio album by American pop rock musician Alex Chilton, released in 1995.

The album consists of six songs written by Chilton, and six cover versions including Jan and Dean's "The New Girl in School", which had featured as the B-side to their "Dead Man's Curve" single.

"It's Your Funeral" is based on Frédéric Chopin's marche funèbre which became the 3rd movement of his Piano Sonata No. 2.

Professional ratings
Review scores
Source	Rating
AllMusic	3.5/5 stars
Chicago Tribune	2.5/4 stars
The Encyclopedia of Popular Music	3/5 stars
Entertainment Weekly	A
The New Rolling Stone Album Guide	2.5/5 stars
Orlando Sentinel	5/5 stars
Pitchfork	6.7/10
PopMatters	7/10
Tom Hull – on the Web	B+

== Title ==
Blues musician Howlin' Wolf employed a pianist named William "Destruction" Johnson in the late 1940s, and Chilton's title is a reference to him as well as a play on both the title of the Western film A Man Called Horse and the Biff Bang Pow! song "A Girl Called Destruction".

== Track listing ==
1. "Sick and Tired" (Chris Kenner) – 3:04
2. "Devil Girl" (Alex Chilton) – 2:55
3. "Lies" (Keith Keller) – 4:01
4. "It's Your Funeral" (Chilton, Jim Spake) – 1:29
5. "What's Your Sign Girl" (Daniel Pearson, Anthony Sepe) – 4:37
6. "Il Ribelle" (Adriano Celentano) – 2:14
7. "You Don't Have to Go" (Jimmy Reed) – 4:26
8. "Boplexity" (Chilton) – 2:56
9. "The New Girl in School" (Brian Wilson, Bob Norberg, Roger Christian, Jan Berry) – 2:10
10. "You're Lookin' Good" (Chilton) – 2:54
11. "Don't Know Anymore" (Chilton) – 3:28
12. "Don't Stop" (Chilton) – 2:46

== Personnel ==
- Alex Chilton – guitar, vocals, harmonica on track 7
- Ron Easley – bass guitar on tracks 1–6, 8–12, guitar on track 7, backing vocals on tracks 5–6, 9 & 12
- Doug Garrison – drums on tracks 1–6, 10–11
- Richard Dworkin – drums on tracks 7–9, 12
- Bob Marbach – organ on tracks 2–3, 10–12
- Al Gamble – organ on tracks 1–4, 10–11
- Charles Hodges – organ on track 8
- Jim Spake – horn arrangements, tenor saxophone on tracks 1–4, 10–11
- Fred Ford – baritone saxophone on tracks 1–4, 10–11
- Nokie Taylor – trumpet on tracks 1–4, 10–11
- The Jackies – backing vocals on track 3
- Recorded at Ardent Studios, Memphis, Tennessee
- Recorded and mixed by Jeff Powell
- Additional engineering by Jeffrey Reed
- Assisted by Erik Flettrich and Mike Kennedy
- Mastered by Larry Nix
- Sleeve design by Jeff Kratschmer
- Art direction by Claire Boger
- Photography by Paula Burch
