= Alex Chilton =

American musician (1950–2010)

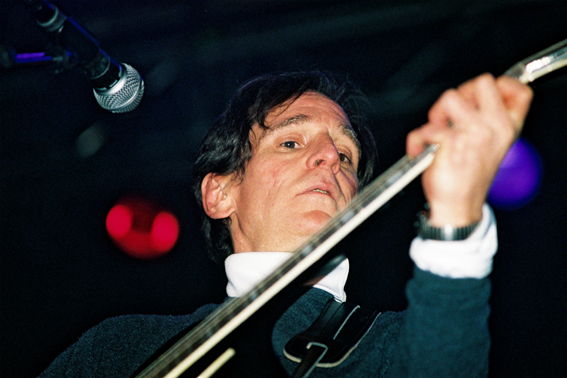
- Chilton performing in 2004

Background information
- Born: William Alexander Chilton; December 28, 1950; Memphis, Tennessee, U.S.
- Died: March 17, 2010 (aged 59) New Orleans, Louisiana, U.S.
- Genres: Rock; power pop; indie rock; blue-eyed soul
- Occupations: Singer; musician; songwriter; record producer
- Instruments: Vocals; guitar; keyboards
- Years active: 1966–2010
- Labels: Peabody; Aura; Line; Big Time; New Rose; Ardent; Thirsty Ear; Last Call; Bar/None
- Formerly of: The Box Tops; Big Star; Tav Falco's Panther Burns

William Alexander Chilton (December 28, 1950 – March 17, 2010) was an American musician, best known as the lead singer of the rock bands the Box Tops and Big Star. Chilton's early commercial success in the 1960s as a teen vocalist for the Box Tops was not matched by similar chart success in his later work with Big Star and in his subsequent solo career on independent record labels. However, he built a devoted following among indie and alternative musicians, and has been frequently cited as a seminal influence by influential rock artists and bands.

== Early life and career ==
Chilton grew up in a musical family. His father, Sidney Chilton, was a jazz pianist and saxophonist who sold industrial lighting to support his family. A local band recruited the teenaged Chilton in 1966 to be their lead singer after learning of the popularity of his vocal performance at a talent show at Memphis's Central High School. This band was Ronnie and the Devilles, which was subsequently renamed the Box Tops. The group recorded with Chips Moman and producer/songwriter Dan Penn at American Sound Studio and Muscle Shoals's FAME Studios.

Chilton was 16 when his first professional recording, the Box Tops' song "The Letter", became a number-one international hit. The Box Tops went on to have several other major chart hits, including "Neon Rainbow" (1967), "Cry Like a Baby" (1968), "Choo Choo Train" (1968), "Sweet Cream Ladies, Forward March" (1969), and "Soul Deep" (1969). Aside from "The Letter", "Neon Rainbow", and "Soul Deep", all written by Wayne Carson, many of the group's songs were written by Penn, Moman, Spooner Oldham, and other top area songwriters, with Chilton occasionally contributing a song. He also contributed a Carson song, "If I Cry," which was recorded in 1968 by the Memphis group the Debuts, featuring Jimi Jamison (future Survivor lead singer) on vocals. By late 1969, only Chilton and guitarist Gary Talley remained from the original group, and newer additions replaced the members who had departed. The group decided to disband and pursue independent careers in February 1970.

After deciding against enrolling as a student at Memphis State University, Chilton began performing as a solo artist, maintaining a working relationship with Penn for demos. During this period he began learning guitar by studying the styles of guitarists like Stax Records great Steve Cropper and Carl Wilson of the Beach Boys. Chilton began recording his own solo material in the fall of 1969 at Ardent Studios with local musicians including producer Terry Manning (who had worked with Chilton as an engineer on the Box Tops' recordings) and drummer Richard Rosebrough, and producing a few local blues-rock acts. His 1969–1970 recordings were released in the 1980s and 1990s on albums such as Lost Decade (New Rose Records), 1970 (Ardent Records), and Free Again: The "1970" Sessions" (Omnivore Recordings).

Chilton was considered as a replacement vocalist for Al Kooper in Blood, Sweat & Tears.

== 1970s career ==
After a period in New York City, during which Chilton worked on his guitar technique and singing style. Biographer Holly George-Warren notes that a chance meeting with Roger McGuinn left a strong impression on Chilton's singing and playing. Chilton returned to Memphis in 1971 and co-founded the power pop group Big Star, with Chris Bell, recording at engineer John Fry's Ardent Studios. Chilton and Bell co-wrote "In the Street" for Big Star's first album #1 Record, a track later covered by Cheap Trick and used as the theme song of the sitcom That '70s Show.

The group's recordings met with little commercial success but established Chilton's reputation as a rock singer and songwriter; later alternative rock bands like R.E.M. and the Posies would praise the group as a major influence. During this period he also occasionally recorded with Rosebrough as a group they called the Dolby Fuckers; some of their studio experimentation was included on Big Star's album Radio City, including the recording of "Mod Lang". Rosebrough would occasionally work with Chilton on later recordings, including Big Star's album Third and Chilton's solo record Bach's Bottom.

Moving back to New York in 1977, Chilton performed as "Alex Chilton and the Cossacks" with a lineup that included Chris Stamey (later of the dB's) and Richard Lloyd of Television at venues like CBGB, releasing an influential solo single, "Bangkok" (with a cover of the Seeds' "Can't Seem to Make You Mine" as the B-side), in 1978. Influenced by the performers in New York's CBGB scene, Chilton's late-1970s recordings abandoned the multi-layered pop production of his Big Star albums and utilized a more minimalist punk and psychobilly-influenced performance style. His songs during this period were often recorded in one take and featured few overdubs. In New York, he met the members of the Cramps, a formative psychobilly group. After moving back to Memphis in April 1978, Chilton produced music by the Cramps that appeared on the group's Gravest Hits EP and Songs the Lord Taught Us LP.

In 1979, Chilton released the album Like Flies on Sherbert in a limited edition of 500 copies. Produced by Chilton with Jim Dickinson at Phillips Recording and Ardent Studios, it features Chilton's interpretations of songs by artists including the Carter Family, Jimmy C. Newman, Ernest Tubb, and KC and the Sunshine Band, along with several originals. Sherbert—which included backing work from such notable Memphis musicians as Rosebrough, drummer Ross Johnson, and Chilton's longtime on-again/off-again companion, Lesa Aldridge—has since been reissued several times. Beginning in 1979 Chilton also co-founded, played guitar with, and produced some albums for Tav Falco's Panther Burns, which began as an offbeat rock-and-roll group deconstructing blues, country, and rockabilly music.

== 1980s career ==
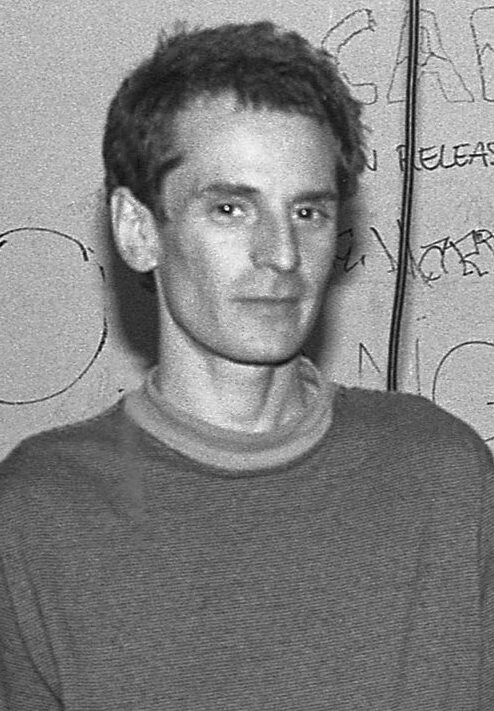
Chilton in 1986

Chilton spent most of 1980 and 1981 living in Memphis and staying off the road, except for a trip to London in May 1980 to play two shows with bassist Matthew Seligman and drummer Morris Windsor of the Soft Boys, and guitarist Knox of the Vibrators. The second show, at the Camden club Dingwalls, was recorded, and was released in 1982 on Aura Records as Live in London. He also continued to work with Tav Falco's Panther Burns on stage and in the studio during this period.

Chilton toured briefly in 1981 as a solo act, backed by a trio of musicians who played at different times with Tav Falco's Panther Burns: guitarist Jim Duckworth, bassist Ron Easley (with whom Chilton would tour and record extensively in the 1990s and 2000s), and drummer Jim Sclavunos. The group played a string of shows in the fall in Chicago, Washington D.C., Philadelphia, New York, and New Jersey; this would be Chilton's last tour for three years.

Chilton moved to New Orleans in 1982, where he spent much of 1982 and 1983 working outside music: washing dishes at the Louis XVI Restaurant in the French Quarter, working as a janitor at the Uptown nightclub Tupelo's Tavern, and working as a tree-trimmer. He resumed playing with Panther Burns in 1983. His new association with New Orleans jazz musicians (including bassist René Coman) marked a period in which he began playing guitar in a less raucous style and moved toward a cooler, more restrained approach, as heard in Panther Burns's 1984 Sugar Ditch Revisited album, produced by Jim Dickinson. He moved back into playing music full-time in the summer of 1984, when he and Coman began a four-month stretch playing in a cover band called the Scores, working in four-hour shifts at the Bourbon Street tourist bar Papa Joe's, and taking requests from a printed list of songs placed on the customer tables.

After the cover-band job ended, Chilton contacted a booking agent recommended to him by the dB's drummer Will Rigby, and soon had a handful of club gigs lined up in New York, New Jersey, and Boston for the fall of 1984. He stopped playing regular gigs with Panther Burns and formed a trio with the group's bassist, Coman, and drummer Joey Torres to play his out-of-town bookings. At this point, his career was effectively relaunched, and for the next 25 years, Chilton sporadically led a three-piece touring band (augmented by saxophonist Jim Spake in 1989 and 1990), recorded studio and live solo records for several independent record labels, and reunited with versions of his previous bands the Box Tops and Big Star for brief tours and recordings.

At the outset of this period, while in New York in 1985 to play a booking at Danceteria, Chilton was connected through a journalist with Patrick Mathé, founder of the Paris-based record label New Rose. Chilton's business relationship with Mathé would last the rest of his life, and New Rose (and its successor label, Last Call Records) released much of Chilton's solo work from 1985 to 2004 in Europe, as well as a 1998 Box Tops reunion album. In the U.S., Chilton's solo releases were released by the Big Time, Razor & Tie, Ardent, and Bar/None record labels. In 1985, Chilton began working with Memphis jazz drummer Doug Garrison (who had played music with Chilton's father Sidney in a big band), and his trio continued touring and began to record as well. Six songs were recorded at Ardent Studios for the 1985 EP Feudalist Tarts, three originals joined by songs from the catalogs of Carla Thomas, Slim Harpo, and Willie Tee. In 1986 Chilton followed this with a second EP, No Sex, which contained three more originals, including the extended mood piece, "Wild Kingdom", a song highlighting Coman's jazz-oriented, improvisational bass interplay with Chilton.

During this period in his recordings Chilton began frequently to use a horn section consisting of Memphis veteran jazz performers Fred Ford, Jim Spake, and Nokie Taylor to imbue the soul-oriented pieces among his repertoire with a postmodern, minimalist jazz feel that distinguished his interpretative approach from that of a simple soul revivalist style. Chilton forged a new direction for his solo work, eschewing effects and blending soul, jazz, country, rockabilly, and pop. Coman left Chilton's solo trio at the end of 1986 to pursue other projects, forming (with Garrison) the Iguanas three years later with other New Orleans musicians; both would record occasionally with Chilton after departing.

In 1986, the Bangles released their second LP, Different Light, which contained a cover version of Chilton's Big Star song "September Gurls". Royalties from this version allowed Chilton, who had struggled financially since leaving the Box Tops, to buy his first new car since his Box Top days, and a piece of rural land near Hohenwald, Tennessee, where he planned to build a small house. The following year, his visibility increased in the alternative rock scene when he was the subject of the song "Alex Chilton" by American rock band the Replacements on their album Pleased to Meet Me, on which Chilton was a guest musician playing guitar on the song "Can't Hardly Wait".

With 1987's High Priest, Chilton released his first full-length LP in eight years, for which he served as producer and wrote four new songs. He was given a $21,000 recording budget by his European and U.S. record labels (New Rose and Big Time, respectively) which allowed him to augment his band on various songs with a three-piece horn section, backup singers, piano, keyboards, and rhythm guitar. He was also able to continue the genre-mixing he had started with Like Flies on Sherbert by including soul, blues, gospel, and rock songs on the same record. He ended the album with a cover of "Raunchy", his instrumental salute to Sun Records guitarist Sid Manker, a friend of his father from whom he'd once taken a guitar lesson; this song was also a standard in his early Panther Burns repertoire. High Priest also included other covers like "Nobody's Fool", a song originally written and recorded in 1973 by his old mentor and Box Tops producer Dan Penn. While his solo career was continuing to pick up momentum, Chilton was also singing Box Tops songs during 1987 with a package tour of 1960s artists including Peter Noone, Ronnie Spector, and ? & the Mysterians.

Chilton followed up High Priest with Black List, his third EP in four years (and his first recording since his mid-1980s career relaunch not to get a U.S. release). Black List continued to display his eclecticism, containing covers of Ronny & the Daytonas' "Little GTO", Furry Lewis's "I Will Turn Your Money Green", and Charlie Rich's country-pop arrangement of Frank Sinatra's "Nice and Easy". The EP also included three original songs.

Chilton also produced albums by several artists beginning in the 1980s, including the Detroit group the Gories, and continued producing Panther Burns albums well into the 1990s.

== 1990s ==
Touring and recording as a solo artist from the late 1980s through the 1990s with bassists Mike Maffei, John McClure, and Ron Easley, and with drummers Doug Garrison and, from 1993 on, Richard Dworkin (who also played for many years with the jazz group the Microscopic Septet), Chilton gained a reputation for his eclectic taste in song covers, guitar work, and laconic stage presence. Writing about a live performance in The New York Times, critic Peter Watrous said of Chilton that "he's a soul and blues guitar connoisseur; he chooses his guitar licks as carefully as he does the blues songs he covers, and during his solos, a listener heard a history of soul and blues guitar." Watrous went on to say of the show that "irony flowed over everything, and it was hard to tell exactly what Mr. Chilton was after, except perhaps a little fun."

In 1990 and 1991, Chilton took time off from touring and recording to live during the warm months in a tent on his land in rural Tennessee and work on clearing trees and framing his planned house, a project he was never to complete. In 1993, Chilton recorded Clichés, an acoustic solo record of jazz and pop standards, in New Orleans' Chez Flames studio with producer Keith Keller. The record was inspired by a short solo acoustic tour of the Netherlands in January, 1992. Chilton's final two studio albums featured his band and continued his pattern of mixing together songs from pop, soul, blues, gospel, R&B, swing, and country music. A Man Called Destruction (1995), like High Priest, featured a mix of covers and originals and an expanded band that included horns, keyboards, and occasional backup singers, and was released in the U.S. on the relaunched Ardent Records label. Chilton took an enlarged edition of his band on Late Night with Conan O'Brien in July 1995 to promote the album, playing the song "Lies". This was Chilton's second appearance on national television in less than a year; in October 1994, he appeared on The Tonight Show with Jay Leno with the reformed Big Star. Chilton's final solo studio record, Loose Shoes and Tight Pussy (1999, released as Set in the U.S.), featured Chilton with only Ron Easley on bass and Richard Dworkin on drums. Chilton released one more album as a solo artist during his lifetime, the 2004 CD Live in Anvers, which featured him playing a show in Belgium with a pick-up band of European musicians.

Chilton reformed Big Star in 1993 with a lineup that included original drummer Jody Stephens and two members of the Posies: Jon Auer and Ken Stringfellow. This version of Big Star continued to perform live on an infrequent basis for the rest of Chilton's life. The final Big Star studio album, entitled In Space, with songs penned by the then-current lineup, was released by Rykodisc on September 27, 2005.

Big Star's October 29, 1994, performance, their only known show to be professionally filmed in its entirety, was released in November 2014 by Omnivore Recordings as Live in Memphis. According to Mojo, the DVD documents how Big Star's 1990s lineup defied expectations and endured for another 16 years: "Chilton's musicality is mesmerising as he drives the band.... Alternating between lead and rhythm, he plays with a mix of laser focus and utter insouciant cool."

In 1996, Chilton regrouped in Memphis with original Box Tops members Danny Smythe, John Evans, Bill Cunningham, and Gary Talley, and the following year they recorded Tear Off!, the group's final record with Chilton. The album, which was recorded primarily at Easley Recording Studios in Memphis, was released in Europe in 1998. Chilton subsequently toured with the original group annually. Chilton had toured Europe in 1991 with a version of the band, and had sung Box Tops material as a featured singer in oldies package tours during the 1980s and 1990s. After Chilton's death, the Box Tops were to reform again in 2015 with guitarist Gary Talley as lead vocalist.

In 1998, the Alex Chilton/Chris Bell song "In the Street" (from the first Big Star album) was chosen as the theme music for the U.S. television series That '70s Show at the suggestion of Chilton's friend and occasional touring partner Ben Vaughn. Vaughn was working for the series at the time, and oversaw a new recording of the song by singer Todd Griffin and a group of Los Angeles studio musicians. Starting with the second season of the show, a version recorded by the band Cheap Trick replaced the version recorded by Griffin.

== 2000–2010 ==
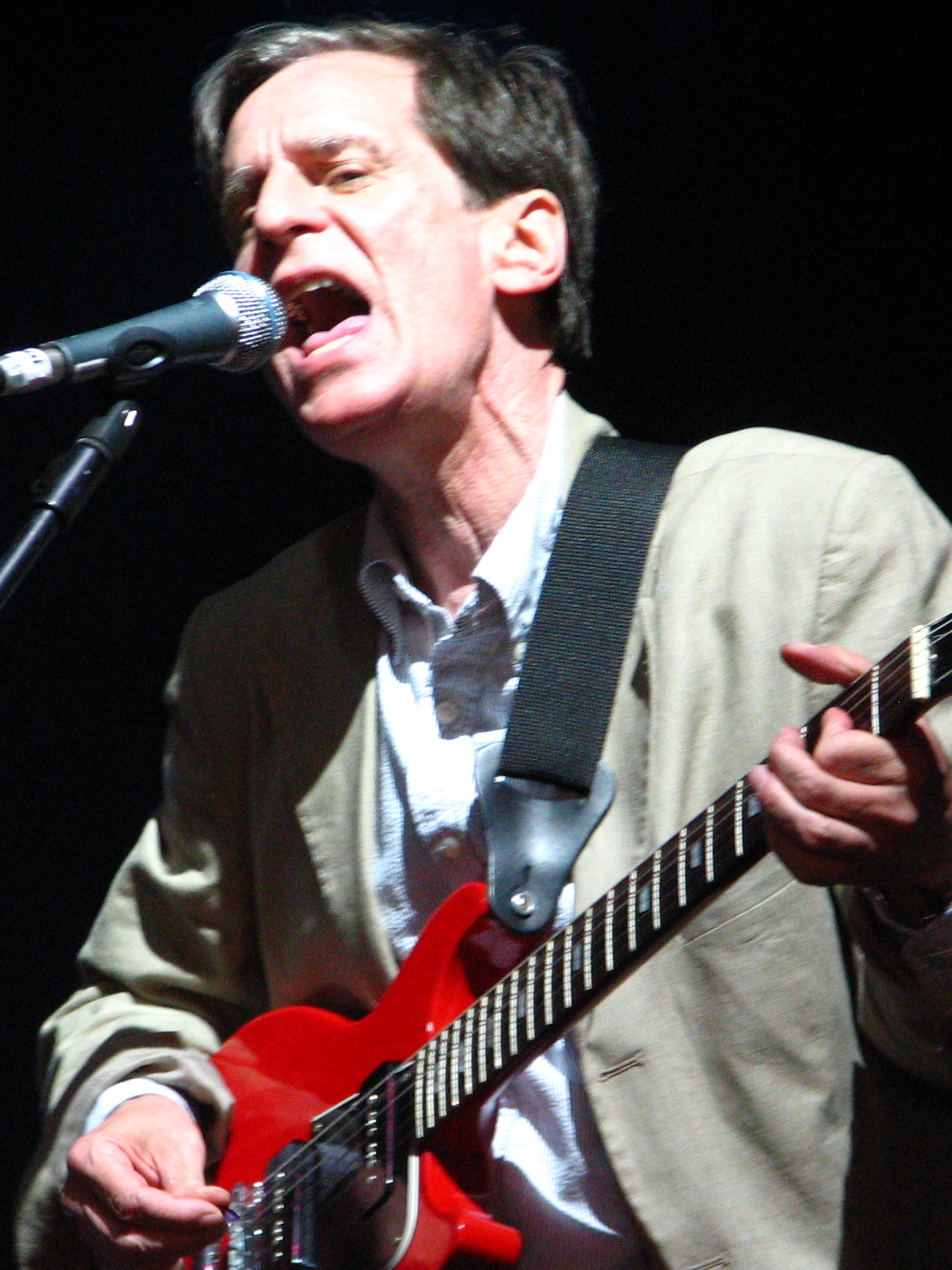
Chilton performing in 2009

Chilton toured and recorded less frequently in his final decade, choosing to spend more of his time at home in New Orleans. In 1995, Chilton purchased a 19th-century center-hall cottage in the Tremé neighborhood for $13,000, and he enjoyed working on his house and practicing Scott Joplin rags on his piano (an instrument he later lost in Hurricane Katrina). "Thanks to his low overhead, Chilton subsisted [during the 2000s] on periodic Big Star, Box Tops and solo gigs augmented by modest publishing income...He saw little reason to hustle more than was necessary to make ends meet and travel, a favorite pursuit," wrote New Orleans journalist Keith Spera in a profile published after Chilton's death. Chilton was present at his home in New Orleans during Hurricane Katrina and evacuated by helicopter on September 4, 2005. In 2009, he remarried. Chilton's last studio projects included playing bass on Cristina Black's The Ditty Session, and producing tracks by guitarist and singer "Johnny J." Beninati, a former member of the New Orleans rockabilly group the Blue Vipers. Chilton's final live performance was in New Orleans on January 24, 2010, where he participated in a benefit show for Haitian earthquake victims.

== Death and memorial ==
Chilton was taken to a hospital in New Orleans on March 17, 2010, complaining of health problems, and died the same day of a heart attack. He had experienced at least two episodes of shortness of breath in the week prior to his fatal heart attack, though he did not seek medical attention in part because he did not have health insurance. He was survived by his wife, Laura, and a son.

He had been scheduled to play a concert with Big Star at the South by Southwest music festival in Austin, Texas, on March 20; the show instead took place as a tribute to Chilton, with guests Curt Kirkwood, Chris Stamey, M. Ward, Mike Mills, John Doe, Sondre Lerche, Chuck Prophet, Evan Dando, the Watson Twins, and original member Andy Hummel (who died four months later) joining the other members of Big Star.

== Honors and awards ==
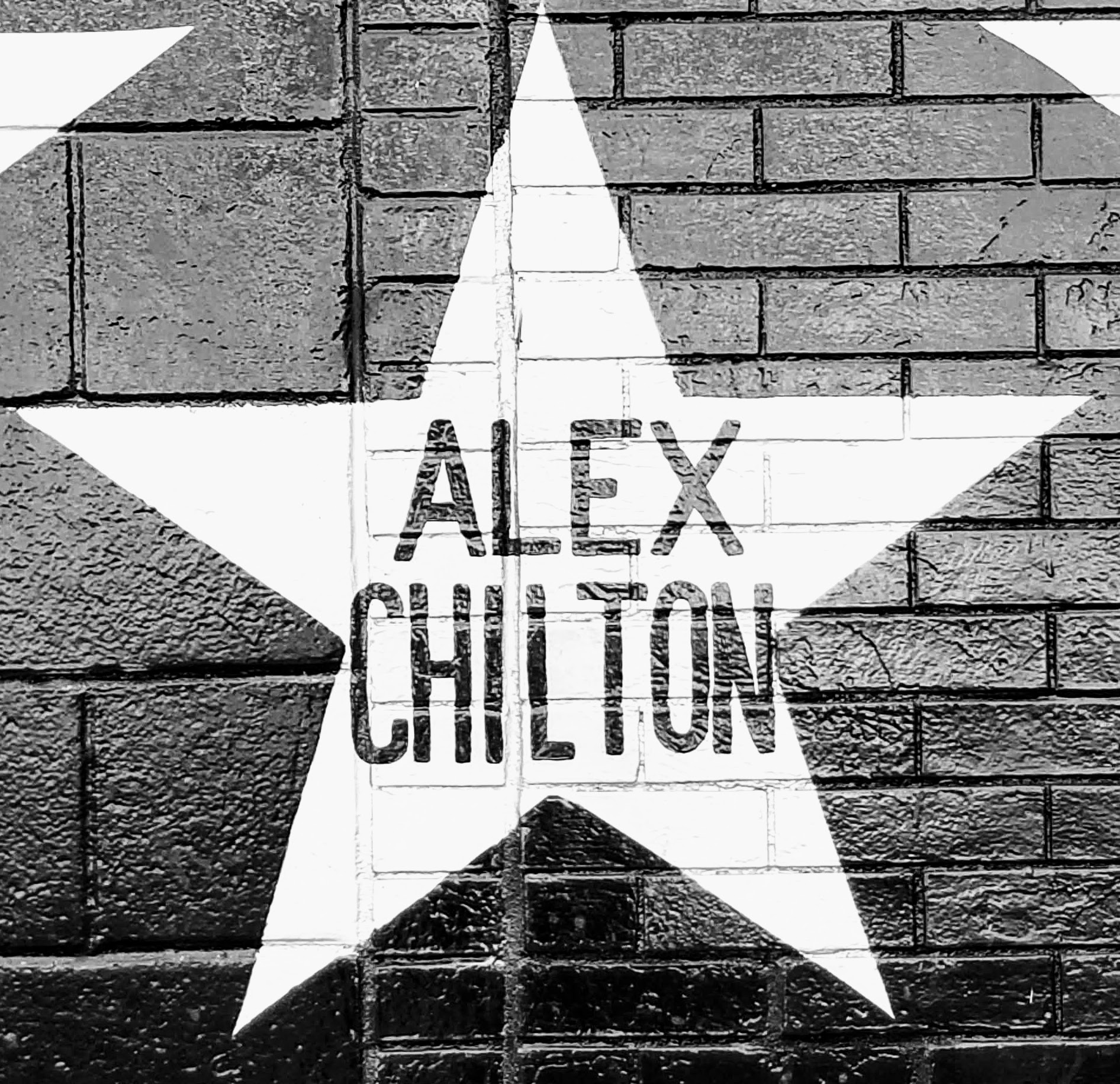
Star honoring Alex Chilton on the outside mural of the Minneapolis nightclub First Avenue

Chilton was honored with a star on the outside mural of the Minneapolis nightclub First Avenue, recognizing performers that have played sold-out shows or have otherwise demonstrated a major contribution to the culture at the iconic venue. Receiving a star "might be the most prestigious public honor an artist can receive in Minneapolis", according to journalist Steve Marsh.

== Discography ==
=== The Box-Tops ===
- The Letter/Neon Rainbow (1967)
- Cry Like a Baby (1968)
- Non-Stop (1968)
- Dimensions (1969)
- Tear Off! (1998)

=== Big Star ===
- #1 Record (1972)
- Radio City (1974)
- Third (1978)
- In Space (2005)

=== Solo Albums ===
- Like Flies on Sherbert – (Peabody, 1979; Aura, 1980)
- Bach's Bottom – (Line, 1980, remixed & reissued 1993 on Razor & Tie)
- High Priest – (New Rose/Big Time, 1987; reissued 1994 on Razor & Tie)
- Clichés – (Ardent, 1993)
- A Man Called Destruction – (Ardent, 1995)
- 1970 – (Ardent, 1996 – Recorded between his tenures with the Box Tops and Big Star, but unreleased until 1996; reissued in 2012 as Free Again: The "1970" Sessions on Omnivore Recordings OVCD-13, Ace Records OVLP13 CDWIKD 302)
- Cubist Blues, with Ben Vaughn and Alan Vega – (Discovery, 1997; reissued by Last Call in 2006, with an extra disc recorded live)
- Loose Shoes and Tight Pussy – (Last Call, 1999; Munster, 1999). Released in the USA as Set (Bar/None Records, 2000)

=== Solo Singles and EPs ===
- Singer Not the Song (EP) – (Ork, 1977) – Five songs from the 1975 session later released in full as Bach's Bottom and also on the One Day In New York album. Original Ork release included "Free Again", "The Singer Not The Song", "Take Me Home & Make Me Like It", "All The Time", and "Summertime Blues".
- "Bangkok" / "Can't Seem to Make You Mine" – (Fun, 1978)
- "Hey Little Child" / "No More the Moon Shines on Lorena" – (Aura 1980 UK)
- Feudalist Tarts (EP) – (New Rose/Big Time, 1985; reissued 1994 on Razor & Tie)
- No Sex (EP) – (New Rose/Big Time, 1986; reissued 1994 on Razor & Tie)
- Black List (EP) – (New Rose, 1989; reissued 1994 on Razor & Tie)
- "All We Ever Got From Them Was Pain (Original Mix)" / "All We Ever Got From Them Was Pain (Demo)" – (Omnivore Recordings OVS7-14, 2011)

=== Live albums ===
- Live in London – (Aura, 1982 UK). Recorded live at Dingwalls, London, England Wednesday, May 28, 1980.
- Live in Anvers – (Last Call/Rykodisc, 2004)
- Electricity By Candlelight / NYC 2/13/97 – (Bar/None, 2013)
- Ocean Club '77 – (Norton Records, 2015). A 1977 live gig in NYC.
- Boogie Shoes: Live on Beale Street – (Omnivore Recordings, 2021). As Alex Chilton and Hi Rhythm Section, recorded live at the New Daisy Theatre, Memphis, October 7, 1999.

=== Compilation albums ===
- One Day in New York – (Trio Records, 1978). Combines the Singer Not the Song EP with a 6-song live set by Alex Chilton and the Cossacks, recorded 1977 in New York. Expanded for a 1991 CD release, with an additional studio track from the Bach's Bottom session.
- Alex Chilton's Lost Decade – (Fan Club, 1985)
- Document – (Aura, 1985)
- Stuff – (New Rose, 1987)
- Best of Alex Chilton – (New Rose, 1991)
- 19 Years: A Collection of Alex Chilton – (Rhino, CD and cassette, 1991)
- Top 30 – (Last Call, 1997)
- Free Again: The "1970" Sessions – (Omnivore Recordings OVCD-13, 2011)
- From Memphis to New Orleans – (Bar/None, 2019). A compilation of rock songs, from studio recordings 1985-1989.
- Songs from Robin Hood Lane – (Bar/None, 2019). A compilation of traditional pop songs. Combines five tracks from the solo acoustic album Clichés with seven band tracks in the jazz vocal idiom produced by bassist Ron Miller. Three of the band tracks previously appeared on the Chet Baker tribute album Imagination (Rough Trade, 1991), and four were previously unreleased.

=== Appeared on ===
- Caroline Now!: The Songs of Brian Wilson and the Beach Boys – (Marina 2000). Alex plays "I Wanna Pick You Up".
- Step Right Up: The Songs of Tom Waits – (Manifesto, 1995). Alex plays "Downtown"
- Who Covers Who? – (CM Discs, 1993). A tribute to the Who. Alex plays "Anyway, Anyhow, Anywhere".
- Imagination – (Rough Trade, 1991). A Chet Baker tribute credited to the group Medium Cool, a musical project organized by James Chance. Alex sings "Look for the Silver Lining", "Let's Get Lost", and "That Old Feeling". (All three tracks later included on the Alex Chilton album Songs from Robin Hood Lane.)
- Play New Rose for Me – (New Rose, 1986). Alex plays the Troggs' "With a Girl Like You". Also included on the Rhino compilation 19 Years.
- The Bigtime Syndrome – (Big Time, 1987). Alex plays the Porter Wagoner song "Rubber Room".
- Love Is My Only Crime – (Veracity, 1993). Alex plays the Jim McBride song "Bet Your Heart on Me", a 1981 hit for country singer Johnny Lee. Listed on the album as "You Can Bet Your Heart on Me".
- Acoustic Music Project – A Benefit for Project Open Hand – (Alias, 1990). Live versions of "Guantanamerika" and "No Sex" (unlisted bonus track). Recorded live at Great American Music Hall, San Francisco.
- Best of Mountain Stage Live, Volume 3 (BMP, 1992). Alex plays "Guantanamerika".
- Live at the Knitting Factory: Downtown Does the Beatles – (Knitting Factory Works, 1992) Alex plays "I Want to Hold Your Hand".
- Vera Groningen – Beauty in the Underworld – (Vera, 1990). Alex plays the Porter Wagoner song "Rubber Room", recorded live on May 21, 1986, with René Coman and Doug Garrison at the Vera club in Groningen, Netherlands.
- Shoeshine Chartbusters – (Shoeshine, 1997). Alex plays "We're Gonna Make It" by Little Milton, "A Lot of Livin' to Do" from Bye Bye Birdie, the Fats Domino arrangement of "Margie", the Big Joe Turner song "Hide and Seek", and the standard "There Will Never Be Another You", live recording, backed by Alan Hutchison (Superstar), bass, and Francis Macdonald (Teenage Fanclub), drums.
- The Weedkiller's Daughter – (John & Mary, 1993)
- I Shall Be Released – (Carmaig de Forest, 1987)
- See My Friends – (Ray Davies, 2010)
- The Ditty Sessions – (Cristina Black, 2010)
