= Don and Juan =

R&B music artists

Don and Juan were an American R&B vocal duo from Long Beach, New York, United States, consisting of Roland "Don" Trone (July 2, 1936 – May 1982) and Claude "Juan" (aka "Sonny") Johnson (November 24, 1934 – October 31, 2002). Johnson had previously sung with a doo-wop group called the Genies, who reached No. 71 on the Billboard pop chart in 1959, with "Who's That Knocking" on the Shad record label. Johnson had also co-written "Who's That Knocking".

Don and Juan's sole top 40 hit was "What's Your Name" on Big Top Records 45-3079, released in late 1961 which reached No. 7 on the Billboard pop chart in 1962. Later they had a less successful follow-up record with "Magic Wand", Big Top 45-3121.

After the death of Roland Trone in May 1982 at age 45, Claude Johnson continued performing with different partners, including Alexander "Buddy" Faison of the Genies, up to the early 1990s.

Claude Johnson died on October 31, 2002, at age 67.

In 1981 the NYC based Afro-Cuban rumba vocal/percussion group, Totico y Sus Rumberos, recorded a rumba/guaguanco version of the song that was released on the Montuno Records label that became a cult classic in the city's Latino community.

"What's Your Name", was featured on the soundtrack of It Came from Hollywood in 1982. This song was nominated to the Doo-Wop Hall of Fame. "What's Your Name" was also mentioned in the film, Flipped, by fictional characters portraying "Don and Juan". In the 1998 film, Slam, there is a brief scene where two police officers are driving while arguing over the lyrics to "What's Your Name".

== Discography ==
=== Singles ===
Year	Title	Peak chart positions	Record Label	B-side
Year	Title	US Pop	Record Label	B-side
1961	"What's Your Name"	7	Bigtop	"Chicken Necks"
1962	"Two Fools Are We" / "Pot Luck"	—	Bigtop	"Pot Luck"
1962	"Magic Wand"	91	Bigtop	"What I Really Meant to Say"
1963	"True Love Never Runs Smooth"	—	Bigtop	"Is It All Right if I Love You?"
1963	"Lonely Man"	—	Mala	"Could This Be Love"
1964	"Pledging My Love"	—	Mala	"Molinda"
1964	"Sincerely"	—	Mala	"Mary Ann Cherie"
1965	"I Can't Help Myself"	—	Mala	"All That’s Missing Is You"
1965	"The Heartbreaking Truth"	—	Mala	"Thank Goodness"
1966	"Because I Love You"	—	Twirl	"Are You Putting Me on the Shelf"
