= John Buck Wilkin =

American singer-songwriter and session musician

John "Buck" Wilkin
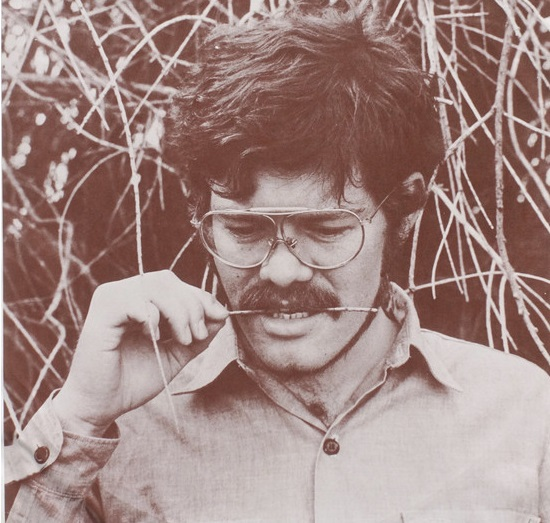
- Wilkin in 1970

Background information
- Also known as: Bucky Wilkin, Ronny Dayton
- Born: April 26, 1946; Tulsa, Oklahoma, US
- Died: April 6, 2024 (aged 77) Linden, Tennessee, US
- Genres: Pop, rock, folk
- Occupations: Singer, songwriter
- Instruments: Vocals, guitar
- Years active: 1960s–2024
- Labels: Liberty Records, United Artists Records
- Formerly of: Ronny & the Daytonas; Buzz and Bucky; The American Eagles

John William "Buck" Wilkin (April 26, 1946 – April 6, 2024) was an American singer-songwriter and session musician. Wilkin started his career as a child on the Ozark Jubilee television program with Brenda Lee. His mother, songwriter Marijohn Wilkin, later moved the family to Nashville, Tennessee, where she started the publishing company Buckhorn Music. Wilkin and Buckhorn Music had a hit in 1964 with his original composition "GTO", which he recorded as a member of Ronny & the Daytonas and was frequently covered by groups such as the Beach Boys and the Hondells.

By 1970, Wilkin started his solo career with the album In Search of Food, Clothing, Shelter and Sex; a year later he appeared in Dennis Hopper's The Last Movie and on its soundtrack. He later worked as a session musician for the recordings of several artists as a guitar player. In the 1990s, with the resurgence of his band and "G.T.O.", Wilkin returned to perform with Ronny & the Daytonas.

== Early life ==
John William "Buck" Wilkin was born on April 26, 1946, in Tulsa, Oklahoma, the son of songwriter Marijohn Wilkin and Sam Frevert. The couple divorced soon after his birth, and she married Art Wilkin, Jr. His mother was a country music songwriter and a teacher. When he was eight years old, Wilkin was discovered by a scout of the Ozark Jubilee while he was singing at the Rialto Theater in Tulsa. The family then moved to Springfield, Missouri, for him to appear in the show, where he worked with Brenda Lee. He appeared at the Junior Ozark Jubilee on ABC-TV, while he also often performed at The Uncle Hiram Show on KVOO-TV. After agent Lucky Moeller heard Wilkin's mother playing the piano at a bar, he convinced her to move to Nashville. There she worked as a pianist in Printer's Alley while her son was signed to a management contract with Jim Denny. Marijohn Wilkin then worked at the Cedarwood Publishing Company for Denny until he died in 1963. In 1964, she started the publishing company Buckhorn Music with Bill Justis.

== Recording career ==
As a teenager, Wilkin played rock and roll at roller rinks with the band the Majestics. He was inspired during a physics class in high school to write the song "GTO". During the process, Wilkin contacted Pontiac for recommendations regarding the lyrics: Promotion and advertising worker Jim Wangers later stated that he saw the song as a "2-minute and 20-second commercial for Pontiac". Marijohn Wilkin liked the composition, and through her connections in the industry, she arranged a recording session with Nashville musicians, which took place at the Monument Records studio. To profit from the success of surf music, Wilkin sang under the pseudonym of Ronny Dayton in the band Ronny & the Daytonas under the management of Justis.

In the summer of 1964, the group released "GTO". The song became the first hit record for Buckhorn Music. It reached number 4 on the Billboard Hot 100, while it reached number 5 on the Cashbox Singles Chart. With the success of the song, Wilkin went on a tour of the East Coast lip-syncing, and he then went on a USO tour to Asia. Still a high school student at the time, he was exhausted by the demanding routine. While Wilkin made the recordings with his band, the Memphis, Tennessee, group The Hombres presented themselves on tour as Ronny & the Daytonas. The band's next top 40 hit on the Billboard Hot 100 appeared in January 1966 with "Sandy", at number 2. Wilkin also recorded with Buzz Cason as "Buzz and Bucky", with "The Statues", "The American Eagles" and with "Garry Miles". Wilkin appeared on Billboard's Bubbling Under Hot 100 with "Tiger-A-Go-Go", "Somebody to Love Me" and "I'll Think of the Summer" between 1965 and 1966. Ronny & the Daytonas did not have a fixed lineup, as the band consisted of Wilkin's friends depending on their availability.

In 1965, Wilkin met singer-songwriter Kris Kristofferson. Through his platoon leader, Donald Kelsey, Kristofferson was directed to send his songs to Wilkin's mother. In August 1965, John Wilkin picked up Kristofferson at the Nashville Airport to head to Buckhorn Music, where he became the first artist signed by the publisher. In the late 1960s, Wilkin shared an apartment with Kristofferson, where they often took part in guitar pulls with other aspiring songwriters. In 1970, Wilkin released his debut solo album on Liberty Records: In Search of Food, Clothing, Shelter and Sex, recorded at Muscle Shoals Sound Studio and in Nashville. The next year, he published the LP Buck Wilkin on United Artists Records. Kristofferson later introduced Wilkin to director Dennis Hopper, who invited him to take part on his production of The Last Movie filmed on location in Peru. Songs by Wilkin were featured on the soundtrack of The Last Movie, as well as on the 1971 accompanying documentary of the making of the film, The American Dreamer. Following the production of the movie, Wilkin enrolled at Vanderbilt, where he graduated with a bachelor of arts degree in English.

Wilkin played the guitar as a session musician in Nashville for several artists, including Waylon Jennings, Kinky Friedman, and Jessie Colter. During the late 1990s, with the appearance of the oldies radio format, Wilkin returned to perform with the Daytonas in 1997, and by 1999, "GTO" reached a million plays on the radio. In the 2000s through the 2020s, Wilkin uploaded the demonstration recordings of his new songs to his personal website.

== Personal life ==
Wilkin was an only child, and he was never married. During his later years, he lived in an RV park in Hickman County, Tennessee. On April 6, 2024, Wilkin died near Linden, Tennessee. He was buried at Woodlawn Memorial Park in Nashville.

== Discography ==
=== Albums ===
| Year | Album | Label |
|---|---|---|
| 1970 | In Search of Food, Clothing, Shelter and Sex | Liberty Records |
| 1971 | Buck Wilkin | United Artists Records |
