= Jimmy Crack Corn =

American song

"Jimmy Crack Corn (Blue-Tail Fly)"

Song by Virginia Minstrels
- Published: 1840s
- Genre: Minstrel, folk
- Songwriter: Traditional

"Jimmy Crack Corn" or "Blue-Tail Fly" is an American song which first became popular during the rise of blackface minstrelsy in the 1840s through performances by the Virginia Minstrels. It regained currency as a folk song in the 1940s at the beginning of the American folk music revival and has since become a popular children's song. Over the years, several variants have appeared.

Most versions include some idiomatic African American English, although General American versions now predominate. The basic narrative remains intact. On the surface, the song is a black slave's lament over his white master's death in a horse-riding accident. The song, however, is also interpreted as having a subtext of celebration about that death and of the slave having contributed to it through deliberate negligence or even deniable action.

== Lyrics ==
=== "Jim Crack Corn, or the Blue tail Fly" (1846) ===
When I was young I us'd to wait
On Massa and hand him de plate;
Pass down de bottle when he git dry,
And bresh away de blue tail fly.
Jim crack corn I don't care,
Jim crack corn I don't care,
Jim crack corn I don't care,
Ole Massa gone away.

Den arter dinner massa sleep,
He bid dis niggar vigil keep;
An' when he gwine to shut his eye,
He tell me watch de blue tail fly.
Jim crack corn &c.

An' when he ride in de arternoon,
I foller wid a hickory broom;
De poney being berry shy
When bitten by de blue tail fly.
Jim crack corn &c.

One day he rode aroun' de farm,
De flies so numerous dey did swarm;
One chance to bite 'im on the thigh,
De debble take dat blu tail fly.
Jim crack corn &c.

De poney run, he jump an' pitch,
An' tumble massa in de ditch;
He died, an' de jury wonder'd why
De verdic was de blue tail fly.
Jim crack corn &c.

Dey laid 'im under a 'simmon tree,
His epitaph am dar to see:
'Beneath this stone I'm forced to lie,
All by de means ob de blue tail fly.
Jim crack corn &c.

Ole massa gone, now let 'im rest,
Dey say all tings am for de best;
I nebber forget till de day I die,
Ole massa an' dat blue tail fly.
Jim crack corn &c.

De hornet gets in your eyes an nose,
De skeeter bites y'e through your close,
De gallinipper sweeten high,
But wusser yet de blue tail fly.
Jim crack corn &c.

=== "De Blue Tail Fly, a Negro Song" (1846) ===
O when you come in summer time,
To South Carlinar's sultry clime,
If in de shade you chance to lie,
You'll soon find out de blue tail fly,
An scratch 'im wid a brier too.

Dar's many kind ob dese here tings,
From diff'rent sort ob insects springs;
Some hatch in June, an some July,
But August fotches de blue tail fly,
An scratch 'im wid a brier too.

When I was young, I used to wait
On Massa's table an hand de plate;
I'de pass de bottle when he dry,
An brush away de blue tail fly.
An scratch 'im &c.

Den arter dinner massa sleep,
He bid me vigilance to keep;
An when he gwine to shut he eye,
He tell me watch de blue tail fly.
An scratch 'im &c.

When he ride in de arternoon,
I foller wid a hickory broom;
De poney being berry shy,
When bitten by de blue tail fly.
An scratch 'im &c.

One day he rode aroun de farm,
De flies so numerous did swarm;
One chance to bite 'im on de thigh,
De debble take dat blue tail fly.
An scratch 'im &c.

De poney run, he jump, an pitch,
An tumble massa in de ditch;
He died, an de Jury wonder why,
De verdict was, de "blue tail fly."
An scratch 'im &c.

Dey laid 'im under a simmon tree,
His epitaph am dar to see;
Beneath dis stone I'm forced to lie,
All by de means ob de blue tail fly.
An scratch 'im &c.

Ole Massa's gone, now let him rest,
Dey say all tings am for de best;
I neber shall forget till de day I die,
Ole Massa an de blue tail fly.
An scratch 'im &c.

De hornet gets in your eyes an nose,
De skeeter bites y'e through your close,
De gallinipper sweeten high,
But wusser yet de blue tail fly.
An scratch 'im &c.

"De Blue Tail Fly" was published by both Keith's Music House (Note: "De Blue Tail Fly." Keith's Music Publishing House (Boston), 1846. Reprinted in Mahar, pp. 237 f.) and Oliver Ditson in Boston in 1846, but Eric Lott (citing Hans Nathan) gives the version a date of 1844. This probably refers to Christy's Minstrels' Ethiopian Glee Book, which has sometimes been mistakenly attributed to 1844; in fact, that series did not begin publishing until 1847 and did not include Christy's version of this song until its 1848 edition.

=== "Jim Crack Corn" (1847) ===
I sing about de long-tail blue,
So often you want someting new;
Wid your desire I'll now comply,
An' sing about de blue-tail fly.
Jim Crack com', I don't care,
Jim Crack com', I don't care,
Jim Crack com', I don't care.
Ole Massa well a-day.

When I was home, I used to wait
On Massa—han' him roun' de plate;
I pass'd de bottle when he was dry,
An' brush'd away de blue-tail fly.
Jim Crack com', &c

Ole Massa ride in de arternoon,
I follows him wid a kickeribroom;
De pony rear'd when he was dry,
An' bitten by de blue-tail fly.
Jim Crack com', &c.

De pony jump'd, he rear'd, he pitch'd,
He tumbled Massa in a ditch;
De wonder was he didn't die,
When bitten by de blue-tail fly.
Jim Crack com', &c.

Dey buried him 'neath a simmon tree;
His paragraph is dere, you'll see;
Beneath de shade he's forced to lie,
All by de means ob de blue-tail fly.
Jim Crack com', &c.

Ole Massa's dead, so let him res';
Dey say all tings is for de bes'.
I shall neber forget to de day I die,
Ole Massa an' de blue-tail fly.
Jim Crack com', &c.

=== "Jim Crack Corn! I Don't Care." (1847) ===
If you should go in summer time,
To Souf Carolina sultra clime,
And in de shade you chance to lie,
You'll soon find but dat blue tail fly.
Jim crack corn I don't care!
Jim crack corn! I don't care.
For massa me gave away.

When I was young I used to wait,
On massa's table and hand de plate,
I'd pass the bottle when he dry,
An brush away de blue tail fly.
Jim crack, &c.

When ole massa take his sleep,
He bid dis nigga sight to keep,
And when he gows to shut his eye,
He tell me watch dat blue tail fly.
Jim crack, &c.

Ole massa ride in arternoon,
I follow arter wid a hickory broom,
De pony he is bery shy,
Kase he bitten by de blue tail fly.
Jim crack, &c.

De pony run dar jump an pitch,
He trowed ole massa in the ditch,
He died an de Jury all did cry,
Dat de verdict was de blue tail fly.
Jim crack, &c.

Ole massa's dead now let him rest,
Dey say all tings am for de best,
I nebber shall forget till the day I die,
Ole massa and de blue tail fly.
Jim crack, &c.

=== "Jim Crack Corn." (1848) ===
When I was young I used to wait
On Massa and hand him de plate;
Pass down de bottle when he get dry,
And brush away de blue-tail fly.
Jim crack corn I don't care,
Jim crack corn I don't care,
Jim crack corn I don't care,
Ole Massa gone away.

Den arter dinner massa sleep,
He bid dis niggar vigil keep;
An' when he gwine to shut his eye,
He tell me watch de blue-tail fly.
Jim crack corn, &c.

An' when he ride in de arternoon,
I foller wid a hickory broom;
De poney being berry shy,
When bitten by de blue-tail fly.
Jim crack corn, &c.

One day he rode around de farm,
De flies so numerous dey did swarm;
One chance to bite him on the thigh
De debble take dat blue-tail fly.
Jim crack corn, &c.

De poney run, he jump an' pitch,
An tumble massa in de ditc'
He died, an' de jury wonder'd why
De verdic was de blue-tail fly
Jim crack corn, &c.

Dey laid 'im under a 'simmon tree,
His epitaph am dar to see:
'Beneath dis stone I'm forced to lie,
All by de means ob de blue-tail fly.'
Jim crack corn, &c.

Ole massa gone, now let 'im rest,
Dey say all tings am for de best;
I neber forget till de day I die,
Ole massa an' dat blue-tail fly
Jim crack corn, &c.

Sometimes mistakenly attributed to 1844. (Note: "De Blue Tail Fly" was published by both Keith's Music House and Oliver Ditson in Boston in 1846, but Eric Lott (citing Hans Nathan) gives the version a date of 1844. This probably refers to Christy's Minstrels' Ethiopian Glee Book, which has sometimes been mistakenly attributed to 1844; in fact, that series did not begin publishing until 1847 and did not include Christy's version of this song until its 1848 edition.) With some minor change of punctuation, this is the version that was republished by Oliver Ditson in subsequent song books.

=== "Blue Tailed Fly" (c. 1850) ===
If you should go, in summer time,
To South Carolinar's sultry clime,
An' in de shade you chance to lie,
You'll soon find out de blue tail fly.
An' scratch 'um wid a briar too.

Dar's many kind ob curious tings,
From different sort ob inseck springs;
Some hatch in June an' some July,
But Augus fotches de blue tail fly.
An' scratch 'um wid a briar too.

When I was young I used to wait
On massa table and hand de plate
I'd pass de bottle when he dry,
Den brush away de blue tail fly.
An' scratch 'um wid a briar too.

Den arter dinner massa sleeps,
He bid dis nigga vigils keeps;
An' when he gwine to shut his eye,
He tell me watch de blue tail fly.
An' scratch 'um wid a briar too.

When he ride in de arternoon,
I foller wid a hickory brom;
De pony being berry shy,
When bitten by de blue tail fly.
An' scratch 'um wid a briar too.

One day he rode aroun de farm,
De flies so numerous did swarm,
One chance to bite 'im on de thigh,
De debil take de blue tail fly.
An' scratch 'um wid a briar too.

De pony run he jump an' pitch,
An' tumbl'd massa in de ditch;
He died and de jury wondered why—
De verdic was de blue tail fly.
An' scratch 'um wid a briar too.

Dey laid him under a 'simmon tree,
His epitaph am dere to see
'Beneath this stone I'm forced to lie,
All by de means ob de blue tail fly.
An' scratch 'um wid a briar too.

Ole massa's gone, now let 'im rest,
Dey say all tings am for de best;
I neber shall forget till de day I die,
Ole massa an' dat blue tail fly.
An' scratch 'um wid a briar too.

De hornet gets in your eyes and nose,
De skeeter bite you troo your clothes;
De yalla nipper sweeten high,
But wusser yet de blue tail fly.
An' scratch 'um wid a briar too.

=== From Children of Destiny (1893) ===
When I was young, I useter to wait
Behine ole marster, han' he plate,
An' pass de bottle when he dry,
An' bresh away dat blue-tail fly.
Jim, crack corn, I doan' keer,
Jim, crack corn, I doan' keer,
Jim, crack corn, I doan' keer,
Ole—marster's—gone—away!

== Melody ==
The melody is similar to "Miss Lucy Long" and was originally set for piano accompaniment, although "De Blue Tail Fly" was marketed in Boston as one of "Emmett's Banjo Melodies". The four-part chorus favors a single bass and three tenors: the first and third tenors harmonize in thirds with the second completes the triads or doubles the root, sometimes crossing the melody line. The versions published in 1846 differed rather markedly: "De Blue Tail Fly" is modal (although Lhamar emends its B♭ notation to C minor) and hexatonic; "Jim Crack Corn", meanwhile, is in G major and more easily singable. Its simplicity has made it a common beginner's tune for acoustic guitar. The melody is a chain of thirds (G-B, F♯-A, G-B, [A]-C, B-D, C-E) harmonized a third above and below in the manner of the choruses in Italian opera.

== Meaning ==
The first verses usually establish that the singer was initially a house slave charged with protecting the master and his horse from "the blue-tailed fly." This is possibly the blue bottle fly, (Note: The blue-bottle fly now appears in British proverbs as the "blue-arsed fly" but this name does not seem to predate the 20th century.) but probably the mourning horsefly, a bloodsucking pest found throughout the American South. He is unsuccessful, the horse begins to buck, and the master is thrown and killed. A coroner's jury is convened to investigate the master's death, or the singer is criminally charged with that death, but the death is blamed on "the blue-tail fly" and the slave escapes culpability.

The chorus can be mystifying to modern listeners, but its straightforward meaning is that someone is roughly milling ("cracking") the old master's corn in preparation for turning it into hominy (Note: See, e.g., James Fenimore Cooper's notes using the expression "cracked corn" to explain succotash in The Last of the Mohicans and a hominy-mortar in The Prairie.) or liquor. There has been much debate, however, over the subtext. In the 19th century, the singer was often considered mournful and despondent at his master's death; in the 20th, celebratory. "Jimmy Crack Corn" has been called "the baldest, most loving account of the master's demise" in American song.

The debate has been further muddled by changes to the refrain over time. Throughout the 19th century, the lines referred to "Jim," "Jim Crack," or "Jim Crack Corn" (Note: As early as the next year (1847), a minstrel song devoted to the travails of Jim Crack Corn's wedding day appeared in the same London songbook as the first British version of "Jimmy Crack Corn", which is given as "Jim Crack com'". Susan Eppes's diary of her Civil War years reports he also appeared as a figure in Southern nursery rhymes: "This dress, you must know, is 'made of Mammy's old one' like Jim Crack Corn's coat—Little Diary, I am afraid you do not know very much of Mother Goose.") and lacked any conjunction across the line's caesura. Following the rise of highly-syncopated musical genres such as ragtime and jazz, anaptyxis converted the name to "Jimmy" or "Jimmie" and the "and" appeared, both putting more stress on their measures' backbeat. This has obscured some of the possible original meanings: some have argued that—as "Jim" was a generic name for slaves in minstrel songs—the song's "Jim" was the same person as its blackface narrator. Speaking about himself in the 3rd person or repeating his new master's commands in apostrophe, he has no concern with his demotion to a field hand now that his old master is dead.

Another now-obscured possible meaning derives from jim crack being eye dialect (Note: The British Oxford English Dictionary dates the variant spelling to the 17th century but the American Chambers's Twentieth Century Dictionary still included it as a separate entry as late as 1908.) for gimcrack ("worthless"). (Note: In its noun sense of "trinket" or "bauble", it appears in Mark Twain's Huckleberry Finn: "There was an old hair trunk in one corner, and a guitar-box in another, and all sorts of little knickknacks and jimcracks around, like girls brisken up a room with.) In this interpretation, the narrator is so overcome with emotion (be it pleasure or sorrow) that he has no concern at all about his gimcrack cracked corn, his substandard rations. Since "corn" was also a common rural American ellipsis and euphemism for "corn whiskey," (Note: Attested by the Oxford English Dictionary as occurring by 1820.) it could also refer to the slave being so overcome that he has no concern about his rotgut alcohol. The 1811 Dictionary of Vulgar Tongue by Francis Grose defines a jimcrack as a "spruce woman," so perhaps the lyric refers to the slave being so sad he doesn't have interest in an approaching beautiful woman.

Other suppositions include that "cracking" or "cracking corn" referred to the now-obsolete English and Appalachian slang meaning "to gossip" or "to sit around chitchatting"; that the singer is resting from his oversight duties and allowing Jim to steal corn or corn liquor; that "Jim Crack" is simply a synonym for "Jim Crow" by means of the dialectical "crack" to reference the crake; or that it is all code for the old master "Jim" cracking his "corn" (skull) open during his fall. The 1847 version of the song published in London, singularly, has the lyric "Jim Crack com'" ("come") rather than "corn" — which could refer to the coming of a poor Southern cracker (Note: A usage attested as early as the 18th century.) (presumably an overseer or new owner) or a minced oath for Jesus Christ (thus referencing indifference at the Judgment Day). The same version explicitly makes the fly's name a wordplay on the earlier minstrel hit "Long Tail Blue," about a horse. A number of racehorses have been named "Jim Crack" or "Blue Tail Fly" and, in at least one early-20th-century variant of the song, it's given as the name of the horse that killed the master: (Note: From Dorothy Scarborough's On the Trail of Negro Folk-Songs, credited to Garnett Eskew of West Virginia: I won't forgit till de day I die How Master rode de blue-tail fly. Dat pony r'ar, dat pony kick, An' flinged old Master in de ditch.) but that is not a common element of the song. (Another uncommon variant appeared in the 1847 Songs of Ireland published in New York: it has the slave being given away by the master.)

Explanations of the song based upon "jimmy" or "jimmie" being slaves' slang for crows or mules (here being allowed into the old master's corn fields instead of being chased away) or deriving "jimmy" from "gimme" are unsupported by the existing records. Pete Seeger, for instance, is said to have maintained that the original lyrics were "gimme cracked corn" and referred to a punishment in which a slave's bacon rations were curtailed, leaving him chickenfeed; (Note: In fact, cracked corn in the form of hominy or grits was (and remains) a Southern staple, but the rougher milling involved in its production has associated it with livestock in other regions.) the same lines could also just be asking for the whiskey jug to be passed around. The idea that Jim or Jimmy is "cracking open" a jug of whiskey is similarly unsupported; that phrasal verb is attested at least as early as 1803 but initially applied to literal ruptures. Its application to opening the cap or cork of a bottle of alcohol was a later development.

== History ==
The song is generally credited to Dan Emmett's Virginia Minstrels, whose shows in New York City in the mid-1840s helped raise minstrelsy to national attention. Along with "Old Dan Tucker", the tune was one of the breakout hits of the genre and continued to headline Emmett's acts with Bryant's Minstrels into the 1860s. It was also a common song of Tom Rice. The song was first published (with two distinct sets of lyrics) in Baltimore and Boston in 1846, although it is sometimes mistakenly dated to 1844. However it is quite possible Emmett simply received credit for arranging and publishing an existing African-American song. The song was certainly picked up by slaves and became widely popular among them. The chorus of the song not uncommonly appeared in the middle of other African-American folk songs, one of which may have been its original source. (Note: See, e.g., Scarborough, p. 224, where it appears in "My Ole Mistis": My ol' master promised me When he died he'd set me free. Now ol' master dead and gone An' lef' dis Nigger a-hoein' up corn. Jim crack corn, I don't care ...)

The song differed from other minstrel tunes in long remaining popular among African Americans: it was recorded by both Big Bill Broonzy and Lead Belly after World War II.

Abraham Lincoln was an admirer of the tune, calling it "that buzzing song". Throughout the 19th century, it was usually accompanied by the harmonica or by humming which mimicked the buzzing of the fly (which on at least one occasion was noted disrupting the parliament of Victoria, Australia.). Lincoln would ask his friend Ward Lamon to sing and play it on his banjo and likely played along on his harmonica. It is said that he asked for it to be played as the lead-in to his address at Gettysburg.

Following World War II, the "Blue Tail Fly" was repopularized by the Andrews Sisters' 1947 recording with the folk singer Burl Ives. It then became part of the general Folk Revival through the '50s and early '60s before losing favor to more politically charged material. A 1963 Time article averred that "instead of ... chronicling the life cycle of the blue-tailed fly", the "most sought-after folk singers in the business"—including Pete Seeger, Theodore Bikel, and Bob Dylan—were "singing with hot-eyed fervor about police dogs and racial murder". All the same, Seeger claimed to have been present when Alan Lomax (Note: Seeger related that Lomax claimed to have learnt the song from Dorothy Scarborough's collection On the Trail of Negro Folk-songs.) first taught the song to Burl Ives for a CBS radio show and their duet at the 92nd Street Y in New York City in 1993 was Ives' last public performance.

Seeger maintained that the song's subtext gave it a social justice element but began (with 1953's American Folksongs for Children) to perform and market the work as a children's sing-along. Usually under the name "Jimmy Crack Corn", it remains common at campfires and summer camps. It is also sampled in a number of rap songs—including Tuff Crew and Eminem's compositions (both titled "Jimmy Crack Corn")—playing on the present usage of "crack".

The song has also been recorded as an instrumental:

- An instrumental rock & roll rendition, "Beatnik Fly", was recorded by Johnny and the Hurricanes in 1959, and released on Warwick Records, catalog number M-520. It charted on the Billboard Hot 100 at number 15 in the US, and number 8 in the UK.
- A surf version (inspired by "Beatnik Fly"), "Foam And Fiberglass", was recorded by Mike Adams and the Red Jackets on the album Surfers Beat by Crown Records in 1963.

== In popular culture ==
A commercial for Cingular Wireless in December 2006 raised some controversy when a character having a conversation with "Jim" begins referring to him by every nickname he can think of including Jimmy Crack Corn. Following "a half dozen complaints", Cingular edited out the sequence.

The Bugs Bunny cartoon "Lumber Jack-Rabbit" features Bugs singing several verses of the song.

== See also ==
- "Shoo, Fly, Don't Bother Me!"
- "Polly Wolly Doodle", another minstrel song still sung by American children
- Slave Songs of the United States
- Songs of the Underground Railroad
