= What's Your Name (Don and Juan song) =

Single by Don and Juan
- B-side: "Chicken Necks"
- Released: 1962
- Recorded: 1961
- Genre: Doo-wop
- Length: 2:13
- Label: Big Top
- Songwriter: Claude Johnson

Don and Juan singles chronology
| "What's Your Name" (1962) | "Two Fools Are We" (1962) |

"What's Your Name" is a popular song written by Claude "Juan" Johnson. Released by the duo Don and Juan on Big Top Records in 1962, it climbed to No.7 on the Billboard pop charts. It was their only Top 40 hit.

== Chart performance ==
| Chart (1962) | Peak position |
|---|---|
| US Billboard Hot 100 | 7 |
