= Warwick Records (United States) =

US record label

- Founded: 1959
- Founder: Morty Craft
- Country of origin: United States

Warwick Records was a record label established in 1959 by Morty Craft. One of the label's earliest releases was a jazz album called Memories Of "Jolie" by 'Morty Craft & His Singing Strings'. Herbie Hancock's first appearance on record was for Warwick on an album with Donald Byrd and Pepper Adams. The label's catalogue also included albums by Ralph Burns, Teddy Charles, and Curtis Fuller. Warwick also released the single "Dream Alone"/"Beat Love" by the then relatively unknown Art Garfunkel under the name Artie Garr. Warwick was founded in New York City and was short-lived, closing after the album by Burns.

Best-selling musicians on the label included Johnny and the Hurricanes ("Crossfire", "Red River Rock", "Reveille Rock", and "Beatnik Fly"), the String-A-Longs ("Wheels", "Brass Buttons", "Should I"), the Raging Storms ("The Dribble Twist"), the Tokens ("Tonight I Fell in Love"), and the Fireballs ("Rik-A-Tik", "Quite a Party"). Warwick filed for bankruptcy in 1962.

== See also ==
- List of record labels
