= Mala Records =

American record label

- Parent company: Bell Records
- Founded: 1959
- Defunct: 1967
- Country of origin: United States

Mala Records was a small record label founded as a Bell Records subsidiary in 1959. Beginning in 1967, albums by Mala recording artists were issued on the Bell label instead of Mala. Along with Bell, Mala was acquired in the late sixties by Columbia Pictures and merged with the co-owned Amy Records into Bell Records.

In 1974, the Mala catalog (and the rest of Bell Records) became part of Arista Records, which was purchased by BMG in 1979, and is now owned by Sony Music.

== Mala Records artists ==
- The Birdwatchers
- The Box Tops
- David Gates
- Don and Juan
- The Emperors
- Jimmy Clanton
- Johnny and the Hurricanes
- Jumpin' Gene Simmons
- Link Wray
- Little Caesar and the Consuls
- Reparata and the Delrons
- Ronny and the Daytonas
- Spooky Tooth

== See also ==
- List of record labels
