= Ronny & the Daytonas =

American surf rock band

- Origin: Nashville, Tennessee, United States
- Genres: Surf rock, rock and roll
- Years active: 1964–1967, 1980’s-1995, 2000, 2002, 2015
- Labels: Show Biz, Mala, RCA, Sundazed
- Past members: Paul Jensen; Thomas Ramey; Lynn Williams; Lee Kraft; John Wilkin

Ronny & the Daytonas were an American surf rock group, whose members included John "Bucky" Wilkin (or Ronny Dayton - songwriting, guitar, vocals), Paul Jensen (vocals, guitar), Thomas Ramey (bass, guitar), Lynn Williams (drums), and Lee Kraft (guitar), with contributions from others such as Larry Butler (organ), Ronny Clark (studio guitarist), and Buzz Cason.

== History ==
The group was formed in Nashville, Tennessee, in 1964, when Bill Justis (best known for his hit "Raunchy") became their manager and formed Buckhorn Music with the help of Wilkin's mother, Marijohn Wilkin, a country music writer. Signed to Mala Records, a sublabel of Bell Records, their primary contribution to popular music was in injecting country sounds into the burgeoning surf rock scene. Their 1964 debut single "GTO" reached number four on the Billboard Pop Singles chart. It sold over one million copies and was awarded a gold disc. A subsequent single, "Bucket T", reached number 54 on the Billboard chart that same year.

After an album and tour in 1964, Ronny and the Daytonas had another hit in 1965 with a ballad, "Sandy", and an album that reflected a similar country-inflected surfer sound. In 1966, Ronny and the Daytonas switched to RCA Records and released a romantic ballad called "Diane, Diane" and the upbeat "All American Girl", both of which had some success on the charts. The band toured for a short time after this before disbanding.

In 1965, Buzz Cason and John "Bucky" Wilkin recorded the single "Bay City" / "Tiger A-Go-Go" as Buzz and Bucky. The single did not enter the Billboard Hot 100, but peaked at number seven on the Bubbling Under Hot 100 singles chart.

The mid-1980s had some reunions of various band members for a few engagements. The last known appearances of the Daytonas were at a concert in upstate New York on July 4, 1995, at the Woodward Dream Cruise in Michigan in 2000 and 2002, and at the Baby Boomer Legends concert at "The Factory" in Franklin, Tennessee, on April 24, 2015.

As of 2004, Buck Wilkin Music publishing was licensing Ronny and the Daytonas songs for the U.S. and Canada, and occasionally published their music on 180 gram vinyl media in limited production runs.

== Discography ==
=== Singles ===
1964

- "GTO" / "Hot Rod Baby" (Mala 481) (No. 4) (CAN No. 7)
- "California Bound" / "Hey Little Girl" (Mala 490) (No. 72) (CAN No. 37)
- "Bucket "T"" / "Little Rail Job" (Mala 492) (No. 54) (CAN No. 5)

1965

- "Little Scrambler" / "Teenage Years" (Mala 497)
- "Beach Boy" / "No Wheels" (Mala 503)
- "Sandy" / "Sandy" (instrumental) (Mala 513) (No. 27)
- "Tiger A-Go-Go" / "Bay City" (Amy 924) (by Buzz and Bucky, John "Bucky" Wilkin with Buzz Cason) (No. 107)

1966

- "Somebody to Love Me" / "Goodbye Baby" (Mala 525) (No. 115)
- "Antique '32 Studebaker Dictator Coupe" / "Then the Rains Came" (Mala 531)
- "Dianne, Dianne" / "All American Girl" (RCA 47-8896) (No. 69) (CAN No. 73)
- "I'll Think of Summer" / "Little Scrambler" (Mala 542) (No. 133)
- "Winter Weather" / "Young" (RCA 47-9022)

1967

- "Walk in the Sun" / "The Last Letter" (RCA 47-9107)
- "Brave New World" / "Hold Onto Your Heart" (RCA 47-9253)
- "The Girls and the Boys" / "Alfie" (RCA 47-9435)

=== Albums ===
1964

- G.T.O. (Mala 4001) (No. 122)

1966

- Sandy (Mala 4002)
1. "Sandy" (Buzz Cason, Wilkin) - 2:47
2. "Hold Me My Baby" (Wilkin) - 2:44
3. "Baby Say No" (Wilkin) - 2:34
4. "When Stars Shine Bright" (Cason, Wilkin) - 2:44
5. "Be Good to Your Baby" (Russell, Wilkin) - 3:06
6. "If I Had My Way" (Russell, Bergen White) - 2:55
7. "Then the Rains Came" (Wilkin) - 2:41
8. "Nanci" (Wilkin) - 3:11
9. "Somebody to Love Me" (Cason, Wilkin) - 2:31
10. "Come Into My Heart" (Cason, Wilkin) - 3:18
11. "I'll Think of Summer" (Cason, Wilkin) - 2:58
12. "So in Love" (Cason, Wilkin) - 2:23
