= Bill Justis =

American saxophonist and composer (1926–1982)

- Born: William Everett Justis Jr. October 14, 1926; Birmingham, Alabama, U.S.
- Died: July 16, 1982 (aged 55); Nashville, Tennessee, U.S.
- Other name: Bill Everette
- Education: Tulane University
- Occupations: Musician; composer; musical arranger

William Everett Justis Jr. (October 14, 1926 – July 16, 1982) was an American pioneer rock and roll musician, composer, and musical arranger, best known for his 1957 Grammy Hall of Fame song, "Raunchy". As a songwriter, he was also often credited as Bill Everette.

== Biography ==
Justis was born in Birmingham, Alabama, United States, but grew up in Memphis, Tennessee and studied music at Christian Brothers College (high school department) and Tulane University in New Orleans, Louisiana. A trumpet and saxophone player, while in university he performed with local jazz and dance bands. He returned home to Memphis in 1951 and was eventually taken on by Sam Phillips at Sun Records where he recorded music for himself as well as arranged the music for Sun artists such as Jerry Lee Lewis, Roy Orbison, Johnny Cash, and Charlie Rich, the latter of which he is credited with discovering. Released in September 1957, his song "Raunchy" was the first rock and roll instrumental hit, and its popularity was such that it reached No. 2 on the American Billboard chart by three different artists, Ernie Freeman for Imperial, and Billy Vaughn on Dot. It also reached No. 1 for three weeks in Canada and reached No. 11 in the UK Singles Chart. It sold over one million copies, and was awarded a gold disc. Justis had one other significant hit record, "College Man", that went to U.S. No. 42, and No. 11 in Canada

In 1961, Justis moved to Nashville where he became a successful record producer and music arranger for both pop and country music performers at Monument and Mercury Records and other labels. He played saxophone on the soundtrack for the 1964 Elvis Presley film, Kissin' Cousins and that same year took over as manager of the singing group, Ronny & the Daytonas.

Justis had a number one hit in Australia in 1963 with "Tamoure". The song reached No. 19 in Canada but did not chart on the Billboard Hot 100. In the early 1960s he produced a successful series of instrumental albums on the Smash label (Alley Cat/Green Onions, and Telstar/The Lonely Bull). Justis was credited by Ray Stevens in the TNN special, The Life and Times of Ray Stevens, for giving him the phrase "Gitarzan", which became a million selling hit for Stevens in 1969.

Justis also wrote the scores for several films including Dear Dead Delilah (1972), Smokey and the Bandit (1977), Hooper (1978), The Villain (1979), and Island Claws (1980).

Justis died of cancer in Nashville in 1982, at the age of 55, and was interred in the Memorial Park Cemetery in Memphis.
