= The Box Tops discography =

- Studio albums: 6
- Compilation albums: 10
- Singles: 18

This is the discography of American rock band the Box Tops.

== Albums ==
=== Studio albums ===
Title	Album details	Peak chart positions	
Title	Album details	US BB	US CB
The Letter/Neon Rainbow	Released: November 1967; Label: Bell; Formats: LP, MC, 4-track, 8-track, reel-to-reel	87	37
Cry Like a Baby	Released: April 1968; Label: Bell; Formats: LP, MC, 4-track, 8-track, reel-to-reel	59	45
Non Stop	Released: August 1968; Label: Bell; Formats: LP, MC, 4-track, 8-track, reel-to-reel	—	68
Dimensions	Released: August 1969; Label: Bell; Formats: LP, MC, 8-track, reel-to-reel	77	79
Tear Off!	Released: November 1998; Label: Last Call; Formats: CD, MC	—	—
Now	Released: 2022; Label: Self-released; Formats: CD	—	—
"—" denotes releases that did not chart or were not released in that territory.

=== Compilation albums ===
Title	Album details	Peak chart positions	
Title	Album details	US BB	US CB
Super Hits	Released: December 1968; Label: Bell; Formats: LP, 4-track, 8-track, reel-to-reel	45	42
The Best of the Box Tops	Released: 1976; Label: Kory; Formats: LP	—	—
Greatest Hits	Released: November 1982; Label: Rhino; Formats: LP, MC	—	—
The Ultimate Box Tops	Released: July 1987; Label: Warner Special Products; Formats: CD	—	—
The Best of the Box Tops Featuring Alex Chilton	Released: October 1988; Label: Decal; Formats: LP	—	—
The Best of the Box Tops	Released: 1995; Label: Arista; Formats: CD	—	—
The Best of the Box Tops – Soul Deep	Released: October 1996; Label: Arista; Formats: CD, MC	—	—
Playlist – The Very Best of the Box Tops	Released: January 29, 2013; Label: Bell/Arista/Legacy; Formats: CD, digital download	—	—
The Original Albums 1967–1969	Released: February 16, 2015; Label: Raven; Formats: 2xCD; Australia-only release	—	—
The Best of the Box Tops	Released: 7 October 2022; Label: Edsel; Formats: 2xCD, LP	—	—
"—" denotes releases that did not chart.

== Singles ==
Title (A-side/B-side) Both sides from same album except where indicated	Year	Peak chart positions										Album	
Title (A-side/B-side) Both sides from same album except where indicated	Year	US BB	US CB	AUS	BEL (WA)	CAN	GER	NZ	SA	SWI	UK	Album	
"The Letter" b/w "Happy Times"	1967	1	1	4	1	1	5	4	4	—	5	The Letter/Neon Rainbow	
"Neon Rainbow" b/w "Everything I Am"	1967	24	24	30	—	17	—	5	—	—	57 (Note: Chart position is from the official UK "Breakers List".)	The Letter/Neon Rainbow	
"Cry Like a Baby" b/w "The Door You Closed to Me" (Non-album track)	1968	2	2	46	5	3	14	16	17	—	15	Cry Like a Baby	
"Choo Choo Train" b/w "Fields of Clover" (from Cry Like a Baby)	1968	26	17	96	4	18	—	—	—	6	—	Non Stop	
"727" (New Zealand-only release) b/w "Fields of Clover"	1968	—	—	—	—	—	—	—	—	—	—	Cry Like a Baby	
"I Met Her in Church" b/w "People Gonna Talk"	1968	37	41	32	—	27	—	12	—	6	—	Non Stop	
"Sweet Cream Ladies, Forward March" b/w "I See Only Sunshine" (Non-album track)	1968	28	29	82	—	16	—	—	—	—	—	Dimensions	
"Sandman" (UK, Greece, Yugoslavia and Turkey-only release) b/w "Sweet Cream Ladies, Forward March" (from Dimensions)	1969	—	—	—	—	—	—	—	—	—	—	Non Stop	
"I Shall Be Released" b/w "I Must Be the Devil"	1969	67	72	—	—	51	—	—	—	—	—	Dimensions	
"Soul Deep" b/w "(The) Happy Song"	1969	18	13	7	49	9	—	—	2	—	22	Dimensions	
"Turn on a Dream" b/w "Together" (from Dimensions)	1969	58	35	—	—	29	—	—	20	—	—	Non-album singles	
"You Keep Tightening Up on Me" b/w "Come On Honey"	1970	92	74	—	—	68	—	—	—	—	—	Non-album singles	
"Let Me Go" b/w "Got to Hold on to You"	1970	—	—	—	—	—	—	—	—	—	—	Non-album singles	
"King's Highway" b/w "Since I've Been Gone"	1971	—	—	—	—	—	—	—	—	—	—	Non-album singles	
"Sugar Creek Woman" b/w "It's All Over"	1972	—	—	—	—	—	—	—	—	—	—	Non-album singles	
"Angel" b/w "Hold On Girl"	1972	—	—	—	—	—	—	—	—	—	—	Non-album singles	
"Willobee and Dale" b/w "It's Gonna Be O.K."	1974	—	—	—	—	—	—	—	—	—	—	Non-album singles	
"The Letter" (re-recording; France-only release) b/w "Flying Saucers Rock'n'Roll"	1998	—	—	—	—	—	—	—	—	—	—	Non-album singles	Tear Off!
"—" denotes releases that did not chart or were not released in that territory.
