= Si Siman =

Music producer (1921–1994)

Background information
- Also known as: Si Siman
- Born: Ely E. Siman Jr. January 17, 1921; Springfield, Missouri
- Died: December 16, 1994 (aged 73) Springfield, Missouri
- Genres: country music, pop music
- Occupations: Radio producer Talent manager Television producer Music publisher
- Years active: 1946 to 1987

Si Siman (born Ely E. Siman Jr.; January 17, 1921 – December 16, 1994) was an American country music executive as a radio producer, talent agent, songwriter, record producer, television producer and music publisher who helped transform the sound of music in the Ozarks after World War II and into the 1980s. He discovered Country Music Hall of Fame Members Chet Atkins and Porter Wagoner, and secured record deals for The Browns and Brenda Lee among others; and was the key figure behind Ozark Jubilee, the first network television series to feature America's top country music stars. According to the Encyclopedia of Country Music, he was "the driving force in the emergence of Springfield, Missouri, as a country music center in the 1950s."

== Biography ==
Siman was born in Springfield, Missouri on January 17, 1921, and was a batboy for the Springfield Cardinals. He scored a World Series ring with the Gashouse Gang (1934) St. Louis Cardinals as batboy. He spent a summer and half driving legendary scout Charley Barrett who was working for Branch Rickey, the general manager of the St. Louis Cardinals. He attended Duke University, Berea College and graduated from Drury College after serving in the US Navy during World War II.

=== Radio producer ===
He returned to Springfield and rejoined Ralph Foster's KWTO, where he had worked as a teenager, and became vice president of Foster's RadiOzark Enterprises, Inc., which produced nationally syndicated radio shows from Springfield hosted by such performers as Tennessee Ernie Ford, George Morgan, Smiley Burnette and Bill Ring.

Siman would produce multiple radio shows, including Sermons In Song, Saddle Rockin'Rhythm starring Shorty and Sue Thompson, 260 shows starring Tennessee Ernie Ford, and 293 award-winning radio shows featuring Smiley Burnette. He also produced The Bill Ring Show for General Mills heard on for two years on ABC Radio.

=== An ear for talent ===
Siman discovered Chet Atkins and Porter Wagoner in the early 1950s. He took a recording of "Canned Heat" by Chet Atkins to Steve Shoals at RCA Victor resulting in a label deal. He was Wagoner's first manager having heard him on a local broadcast from a butcher shop in West Plains, Missouri; produced his first hit, "A Satisfied Mind", in Springfield; and signed him to an RCA Records contract in 1951. He told Atkins his given name, Chester, wouldn't make it in country music, and he helped Atkins and The Browns land contracts with RCA. He would pitch Brenda Lee to Paul Cohen at Decca Records and put her on the Ozark Jubilee, Steve Allen Show, the Ed Sullivan Show and the Perry Como show to help launch her career.

=== Television producer ===
From 1954-1961, Siman and Mahaffey were managing vice presidents of Foster's Crossroads TV Productions, and co-executive producers of ABC-TV's Ozark Jubilee, the first popular country music series on network television. In April, 1954, Siman lured Red Foley to Springfield to host the program over a bottle of Jack Daniel's whiskey at the Andrew Jackson Hotel in Nashville, Tennessee. Siman also handled booking most of the show's performers.

Siman and Mahaffey were also co-executive producers of the show's spin-off, NBC's Five Star Jubilee (1961); as well as The Eddy Arnold Show (1956) and Talent Varieties (1955), both ABC.

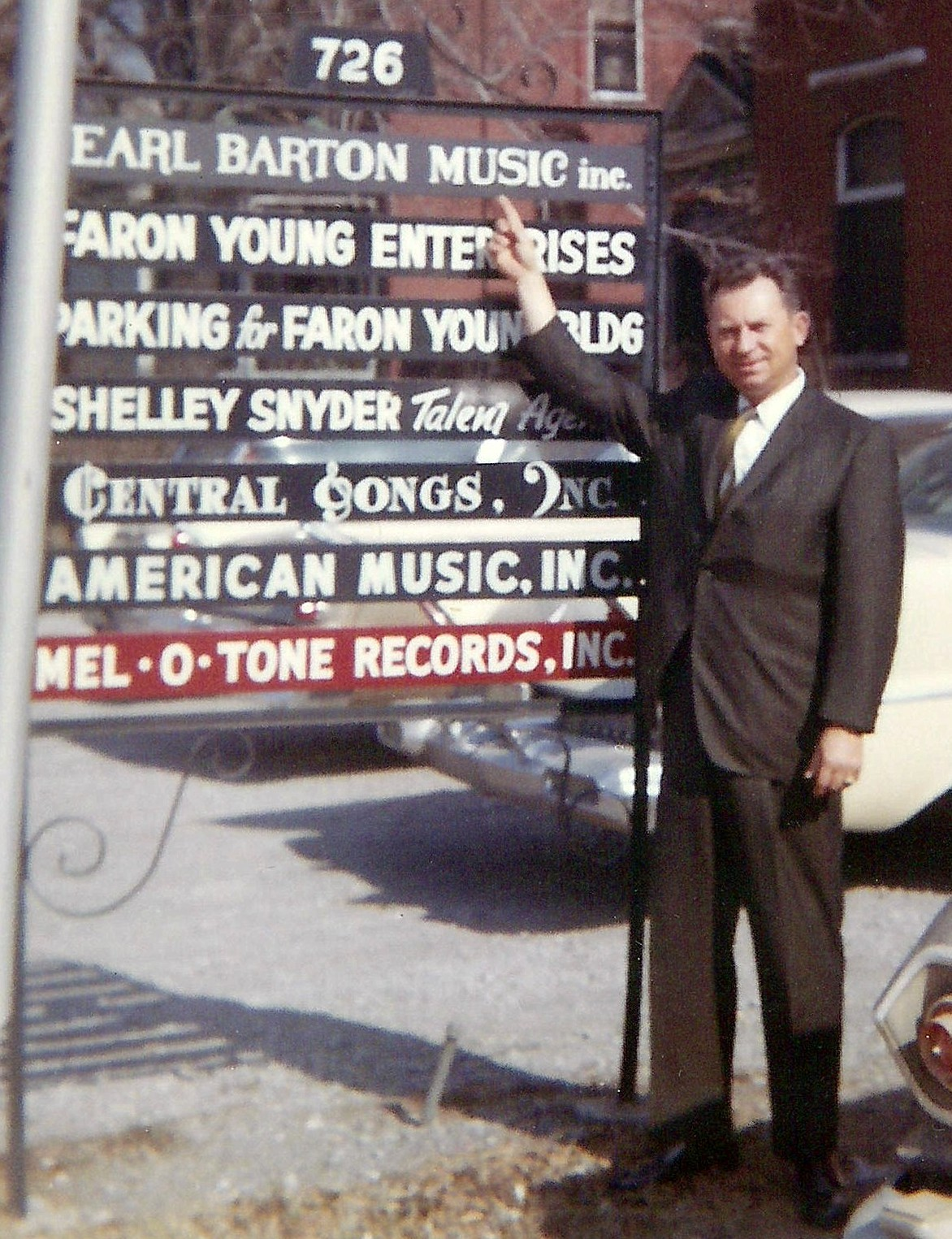
Siman in Nashville in the 1960s

In 1963, Foster, Siman and Mahaffey formed Tele-Color, Inc., which in 1964 filmed color segments for ABC's Wide World of Sports and other programs.

=== Music publishing ===
Siman would publish major hit songs from Springfield, Missouri spanning four decades. Especially noteworthy are the standards "The Letter" (Two-time Grammy Nominee) (#1 1967) - the song would be covered by artists all around the world but would have the distinction of being a top 20 single in the US three times in a span of four years (’67, ’69 and ’70) with the Boxtops, the Arbors and Joe Cocker, and Always on My Mind. (Grammy Song of the Year and Grammy Country Song of the Year, Grammy Best Male Country Vocal Performance, two-time CMA Song of the Year, CMA Single of the Year, Nashville Songwriters Association Song of the Year, ACM Single of the Year, BMI Top 100 Song of the Century, BMI Most Performed Song Award).

1950s: Starting in partnership with Foster and John B. Mahaffey (Foster's nephew), they established the Earl Barton Music, Inc. publishing company. The firm obtained copyrights for national country hits including Little Jimmy Dickens' smash "A-Sleeping at the Foot of the Bed" (1950), "Trademark" with Carl Smith (1953) and Johnny Mullins' novelty tune "Company's Comin'" (1954).

1960s: Siman scored huge success in the late 1960s with songwriter Wayne Carson Thompson, besides "The Letter", "Always On My Mind", he published "Soul Deep" (The Box Tops); "Neon Rainbow" (The Box Tops), "No Love At All" B.J. Thomas, "Do It Again A Little Bit Slower" Jon and Robin, and "Somebody Like Me" Eddy Arnold. He helped such local artists as Ronnie Self and Johnny Mullins ("Blue Kentucky Girl") chart nationally.

1970s: Siman and Carson would gather a string of hits with country music legend Gary Stewart. Working closely with Roy Dea at RCA Records, Stewart would score his only career #1 single with the song She's Actin' Single (I'm Drinkin' Doubles). Other titles were "Drinkin' Thing", "I See The Want To In Your Eyes", "Oh, Sweet Temptation", "Ten Years of This" and "Whiskey Trip". Other #1 singles in the 1970s included "I See the Want to in Your Eyes" with Conway Twitty and Rocky (song) by Dickie Lee (also a top 10 pop hit with Austin Roberts. Top 5 hits included Always on My Mind by Elvis Presley.

In the late 1970s Siman advised Tim Nichols, who later co-wrote Tim McGraw's smash hit "Live Like You Were Dying", and in 1980 urged him to move from Springfield to Nashville.

1980s: Siman would publish three #1 singles in the 1980s before his retirement including The Clown (Conway Twitty song) by "Conway Twitty" and cover versions of Always on My Mind by Willie Nelson and the Pet Shop Boys.

=== Later years ===
In 1970, Siman established the Red Foley Memorial Music Award at Berea College. The annual award is presented to students there in recognition of their musical contributions to the campus.

Silver anniversary envelope label

He was active with the Shriners and was appointed chief aide in 1980. He promoted a show for the Shriners at the Superdome in New Orleans featuring George Strait as the headliner.

When he retired in 1987, Siman sold Earl Barton Music and the rights to a catalog of nearly 2,000 songs to Rolf Budde Musikverlage of Germany. In 1991, he donated his papers to the Country Music Hall of Fame. In January 1994, Siman helped found Ozarks Pictures Corp. to produce family films. Its first feature was 1995's A Place to Grow, shot in southwest Missouri and starring Gary Morris, Wilford Brimley and Boxcar Willie.

Siman died of cancer in Springfield on December 16, 1994.

=== Family ===
His son, Scott Siman, is an entertainment executive in Nashville.

== Posthumous recognition ==
- A scholarship for students pursuing music business studies was established in Siman's name at Middle Tennessee State University.
- In 2008, the Springfield Convention & Visitors Bureau honored him with its Pinnacle Award, noting that "The impact of the [Jubilee] and Siman's efforts are still felt by Springfield's tourism industry."
- He was awarded a "Missourian of the Year Award" for his contributions to the arts.
