= The Letter/Neon Rainbow =

Studio album by The Box Tops
- Released: November 1967
- Recorded: 1967
- Studio: American Sound Studio (Memphis, Tennessee)
- Genre: Memphis soul
- Length: 34:56
- Label: Bell
- Producer: Dan Penn

The Box Tops chronology
The Letter/Neon Rainbow (1967)	Cry Like a Baby (1968)

The Letter/Neon Rainbow is the debut album by American rock band the Box Tops, released in 1967. Following "The Letter" reaching number one on the singles charts, The Letter/Neon Rainbow was quickly assembled for a follow-up.

== History ==
Most of the backing tracks were performed by session musicians; however the original group played the hit "The Letter". The session musicians likely consisted of Reggie Young and Bobby Womack (guitars), Tommy Cogbill (bass), Bobby Emmons (piano, organ), and Gene Chrisman (drums).

Although lead singer Alex Chilton (16 at the time) had already written a number of songs, none were included on the Box Tops' debut LP, perhaps due to his relative inexperience with songwriting. Chilton later had a significant songwriting role in the cult power pop band Big Star, and after the dissolution of the group continued to develop his career as a solo artist.

The Letter/Neon Rainbow was re-released on CD in 2000 on the Sundazed label (SC 6158) with four additional tracks. These included the mono single versions of "The Letter" and "Neon Rainbow"; the 1969 single "Turn on a Dream"; and the previously unreleased track "Georgia Farm Boy".

== Chart performance ==
The album peaked at number 87 on the Billboard Top LPs in 1968, during a fifteen-week run on the chart. On Cash Box the album peaked at No. 37.

== Reception ==
Professional ratings
Review scores
Source	Rating
AllMusic	3/5 stars
The New Rolling Stone Album Guide	3/5 stars

Writing for AllMusic, music critic Richie Unterberger notes Chilton's strong vocals but called the album "a spotty affair showing every indication of having been assembled very quickly in the wake of "The Letter" soaring to number one".

In The New Rolling Stone Album Guide (2004), contributor Greg Kot writes, the "debut album is steeped in Memphis soul, with touches of country and blues, an approach that would remain intact on subsequent releases".

== Track listing ==
1. "The Letter" (Wayne Carson) – 1:55
2. "She Knows How" (Thompson) – 3:08
3. "Trains and Boats and Planes" (Burt Bacharach, Hal David) – 3:48
4. "Break My Mind" (John D. Loudermilk) – 2:29
5. "Whiter Shade of Pale" (Gary Brooker, Keith Reid, Matthew Fisher) – 4:34
6. "Everything I Am" (Spooner Oldham, Dan Penn) – 2:20
7. "Neon Rainbow" (Thompson) – 3:04
8. "People Make the World" (Bobby Womack) – 2:31
9. "I'm Your Puppet" (Oldham, Penn) – 2:54
10. "Happy Times" (Oldham, Penn) – 1:46
11. "Gonna Find Somebody" (Womack) – 3:02
12. "I Pray for Rain" (Oldham, Penn) – 2:26

=== CD bonus tracks ===
13. "Turn on a Dream" (Mark James) – 2:50
14. "The Letter" (Thompson) – 1:58
15. "Neon Rainbow" (Thompson) – 3:00
16. "Georgia Farm Boy" (Mickey Newbury) – 3:48

== Personnel ==
The Box Tops

- Alex Chilton – vocals, guitar
- Gary Talley – guitar, backing vocals
- John Evans – keyboards
- Bill Cunningham – bass guitar
- Danny Smythe – drums

with:

- Dan Penn – backing vocals
  The Memphis Boys
  - Bobby Womack – acoustic guitar
  - Reggie Young – electric guitar
  - Bobby Emmons – piano, organ
  - Tommy Cogbill – bass guitar
  - Gene Chrisman – drums

== Production notes ==
- Produced by Dan Penn
- Engineered by Chips Moman
- Remastered by Bob Irwin
- Original cover photo by Frank Lerner
- Cover art by Rich Russell
- Original cover design – Steven Craig Productions
- Liner notes by Jud Cost and Hal Smith (original and re-issue)
- Re-issue photos & graphics courtesy of Bill Cunningham, Danny Smythe, Clark & Steve Besch, Ric Zannitto, and the Sundazed Archive

== Charts ==
Chart (1968)	Peak position
US Billboard Top LPs	87
US Cashbox Top 100 Albums	37
