= Cry Like a Baby (album) =

Studio album by The Box Tops
- Released: April 1968 (U.S.)
- Recorded: 1968
- Studio: American Sound Studio (Memphis, Tennessee)
- Genre: Pop rock, psychedelic rock
- Length: 30:28 (LP); 44:30 (CD reissue)
- Label: Bell
- Producer: Chips Moman

The Box Tops chronology
The Letter/Neon Rainbow (1967)	Cry Like a Baby (1968)	Non-Stop (1968)

Cry Like a Baby is a 1968 album by the Box Tops. The title song was released as a single and reached #2 in April 1968 on the Billboard Hot 100 chart, a position which it held for two weeks. It was kept out of the top spot by Bobby Goldsboro's "Honey".

== Background ==
Cry Like a Baby was the second Box Tops album to be recorded, and its April, 1968 release followed the group's debut by just five months. The group would continue working at this fast pace, and released its third album, Non Stop, later in the year.

Songwriter Dan Penn was once again the group's producer for Cry Like a Baby, and he was writer or co-writer for half of the album's songs, including the title track. Spooner Oldham co-wrote four of the songs with Penn and played keyboards on the album. Songwriter Wayne Carson Thompson, who had written the group's two hits, did not have any songs on the original LP version of the album, though he did return for the group's final two albums, and gave The Box Tops its final Top 40 hit.

Musician and record producer Jim Dickinson said of this album that it was "Memphis pop production at its best, on par with the great Dusty In Memphis, recorded by the same cast of characters in the same period. Those two records were as good as it gets." According to Alex Chilton biographer Holly George-Warren, the studio band for all tracks except "You Keep Me Hangin' On" was the house band at America Sound Studio, sometimes known as "The Memphis Boys", augmented by Spooner Oldham on keyboards and other musicians playing brass, woodwind, and stringed instruments. The Box Tops themselves accompanied Chilton on "You Keep Me Hangin' On", which uses the psychedelic rock arrangement of the song that was a hit for Vanilla Fudge. At the end of the song, Chilton sings the lyric "and he walked on down the hall" in a spoken word style similar to the vocal by Jim Morrison on the Doors song "The End" which was recorded and released the previous year.

== Chart performance ==
The album peaked at No. 59 on the Billboard Top LPs, during a nineteen-week run on the chart. On another American music magazine, Cashbox, it peaked at No. 45.

== Reception ==
Professional ratings
Review scores
Source	Rating
Allmusic	3/5 stars

Writing for Allmusic, music critic Steve Kurutz called the title song "a perfect slice of blue-eyed soul" and summarized; "All in all, with the exception of "Cry Like a Baby," an album that could've potentially contained some real gems just doesn't."

== Track listing ==
All tracks composed by Dan Penn and Spooner Oldham; except where indicated

1. "Cry Like a Baby" – 2:32
2. "Deep in Kentucky" (Bill Davidson) – 2:09
3. "I'm the One for You" (Harold Thomas, Lee W. Jones, Jr.) – 3:03
4. "Weeping Analeah" (Dan Folger, Mickey Newbury) – 3:02
5. "Everytime" – 2:33
6. "Fields of Clover" – 2:49
7. "Trouble with Sam" (Dan Penn) – 2:14
8. "Lost" (Glen Spreen, Mark James) – 2:27
9. "Good Morning Dear" (Mickey Newbury) – 3:38
10. "727" – 2:16
11. "You Keep Me Hangin' On" (Holland–Dozier–Holland) – 3:45

=== CD bonus tracks ===
12. "Cry Like a Baby" (Digitally Remastered) – 2:32
13. "The Door You Closed to Me" – 2:39
14. "You Keep Tightening Up On Me" (Wayne Carson Thompson) – 2:52
15. "Come on Honey" (Alex Chilton) – 3:24
16. "Take Me to Your Heart" (Billy Wade McKnight) – 2:36

== Personnel ==
- Alex Chilton – lead vocals, guitar
- Bill Cunningham – bass
- John Evans – keyboards
- Danny Smythe – drums
- Gary Talley – guitar, background vocals
- Rick Allen – bass, keyboards
- Thomas Boggs – drums
- Tommy Cogbill – bass
- Reggie Young – guitar
- The Memphis Horns – horns
- Gene Chrisman – drums
- Dan Penn – producer
- Spooner Oldham – keyboards
- Terry Manning – engineer, harpsichord

with:

- Mike Leech – string arrangements
- Frank Lerner – cover photography

== Charts ==
Chart (1968)	Peak position
US Billboard Top LPs	59
US Cashbox Top 100 Albums	45
