= You Left the Water Running =

Song by Otis Redding

from the album Dreams to Remember: The Otis Redding Anthology (1998)
- Released: 1976
- Recorded: July 1966; Fame Studios (Muscle Shoals, Alabama)
- Genre: Soul, R&B, soul blues
- Length: 2:47
- Label: Stone; V-128
- Songwriters: Dan Penn, Rick Hall, Oscar Franks

"You Left the Water Running" is a soul music song written by Dan Penn, Rick Hall and Oscar Franks.

== Otis Redding recording ==
Redding's connection to the song is documented by music journalist Dave Marsh in his 1989 book The Heart of Rock and Soul. In 1966, Redding was visiting FAME Studios in Muscle Shoals, Alabama, when studio owner Rick Hall requested Redding help them with an upcoming session. Wilson Pickett was to record "You Left the Water Running", and Hall wished for Redding to record a demo to assist with the production. A simple recording was made and Redding made some overdub additions, and Pickett made his recording similar to Redding's version.

Ten years later, Marsh was mailed a promo copy of "You Left the Water Running" by Redding on Stone Records (the flipside was an instrumental called "The Otis Jam", which was produced by John Fred, of "Judy in Disguise (with Glasses)" fame). Marsh was fascinated by the song, and mentioned the new single to several friends, including his attorney, who also happened to represent the Redding estate. He soon found out that Stone Records had not obtained the Redding family's permission to release the long-lost demo recording, and demanded the single be pulled from circulation.

When Marsh asked the label's distributor what was to become of the single, he was informed that they were to be destroyed. Instead, Marsh purchased the copies that remained, and gave them out as gifts, with the attorney's permission. As a result, the single (Stone 209) is now highly valuable.

Atlantic Records released "You Left the Water Running" for the first time legally on the compilation album The Otis Redding Story in 1987. Though that box set is no longer available, the song has appeared in similar collections in the years that have followed.

== Cover versions ==
Barbara Lynn's 1966 version of "You Left the Water Running" reached #42 on Billboard's Top Selling R&B Singles chart. The song has been recorded by many other artists, including Wilson Pickett, Don Varner (1967), Billy Young, Maurice & Mac, Amazing Rhythm Aces, The Flying Burrito Brothers, Bobby Hatfield, James & Bobby Purify, Ken Boothe ( who cut a Rocksteady version ) and Huey Lewis and the News (on Four Chords & Several Years Ago (1994)), Billy Price & The Keystone Rhythm Band (1980).

The title is referenced in the last line sung by Alex Chilton at the end of The Box Tops' "Cry Like a Baby" ("You left the water running now") which was another composition co-written by Penn.

== Bibliography ==
- Marsh, Dave. The Heart of Rock and Soul. New York; Plume, 1989., ISBN 978-0306809019

== Pop Culture ==
The Left of the Dial episode of the TV show Cupid, aired May 12, 2009 on ABC, used the tale of the rarity of the Stone Records 7" of Otis Redding's You Left the Water Running as a plot point. The record is a clue to uncovering a mystery.
