= Jon & Robin =

American pop music duo

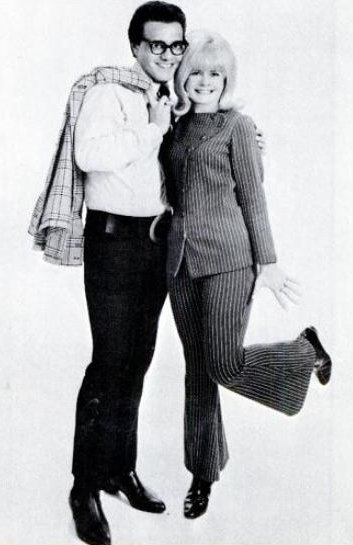
- Jon & Robin in 1967

Background information
- Origin: United States
- Genres: Pop
- Labels: Abnak
- Past members: Jon Abdnor Junior; Javonne Braga

Jon & Robin were an American pop music duo from the 1960s, composed of Jon Abdnor Junior and Javonne "Robin" Braga. The group recorded for Abdnor's father's label, Abnak Records. Wayne Carson Thompson (famous for writing The Box Tops' hit "The Letter") wrote several of the band's tunes, including their one national US hit single, 1967's "Do it Again a Little Bit Slower" (US No.18; CAN No.9), "Dr. Jon (The Medicine Man)", which was a regional hit in Texas and the American South and No.10 in Canada, and "You Got Style" which reached No.70 in Canada. They were often backed by Bobby Patterson and the Five Americans, other Abnak artists, on their recordings. In 1969, Jon Abdnor released a solo album after the duo had parted ways.

== Discography ==
=== Studio albums ===
- Elastic Event (Abnak Records, 1967)
- Soul of a Boy and Girl (Abnak, 1967)
- Intro to Change (Jon Howard Abdnor & The Involvement; Abnak, 1969)

=== Compilation albums ===
- Do It Again! The Best of Jon & Robin (Sundazed Music, 2006)
