= I'm Your Puppet =

Single by James & Bobby Purify

from the album James & Bobby Purify
- B-side: "So Many Reasons"
- Released: September 1966
- Genre: Deep soul
- Length: 2:59
- Label: Bell
- Songwriters: Dan Penn, Spooner Oldham
- Producer: Papa Don Enterprises

James & Bobby Purify singles chronology
"I'm Your Puppet" (1966)	"Wish You Didn't Have to Go" (1967)

"I'm Your Puppet" is a song written by Dan Penn and Spooner Oldham; the best known version is the one recorded by James & Bobby Purify which reached #5 on the US R&B chart and #6 on the Billboard Hot 100 in 1966. The single was nominated for a Grammy Award for Best R&B Performance by a Duo or Group with Vocals in 1967. The song was featured on their 1967 album, James & Bobby Purify.

The duo released a re-recorded version as a single in 1976 which reached #12 on the UK Singles Chart and #20 in New Zealand. In Canada, it reached #4.

Papa Don Enterprises produced the song, and it was arranged by Penn and Don Schroeder.

The single ranked #46 on the Billboard Year-End Hot 100 singles of 1966.

== Chart history ==
=== Weekly charts ===
Chart (1966–67)	Peak position
Canada (RPM) Top Singles	2
U.S. Billboard Hot 100	6
U.S. Billboard R&B	5
U.S. Cash Box Top 100	6

Chart (1976)	Peak position
Ireland (IRMA)	16
Netherlands	14
New Zealand (RIANZ)	20
UK Singles Chart	12

=== Year-end charts ===
Chart (1966)	Rank
U.S. Billboard Hot 100	46

== Other charting versions ==
- Cam-Pact released a version of the song as the B-side to their 1968 single "Drawing Room". Their version charted regionally in Australia, reaching #17 in Melbourne and #26 in Brisbane.
- Dianne Leigh released a version of the song as a single in 1970 which reached #32 on the Canadian country chart.
- Dionne Warwick released a version of the song as a single in 1972 which reached #113 on the US pop chart. It was featured on her 1969 album, Soulful.
- Mickey Gilley released a version of the song as a single in 1988 which reached #49 on the US country chart.

== Other versions ==
- Penn released the original version of the song as a single in 1965.
- Sam & Dave released a version of the song on their 1966 album, Double Dynamite.
- Sandy Posey released a version of the song as the B-side to her 1967 single "Don't Touch Me".
- Geno Washington & the Ram Jam Band released a version of the song on their 1967 EP Different Strokes.
- The Box Tops released a version of the song on their 1967 album The Letter/Neon Rainbow.
- Dandy Livingstone released a version of the song as a single in 1969.
- Marvin Gaye and Tammi Terrell released a version of the song on their 1969 album, Easy, and as the B-side to their 1970 single "California Soul".
- Donny Osmond released a version of the song on his 1971 album, The Donny Osmond Album.
- Mel and Tim released a version of the song on their 1972 album, Starting All Over Again.
- Dionne Warwick's 1972 cover reached #113 (U.S.).
- Foster Sylvers released a version of the song on his 1973 album, Foster Sylvers.
- Jimmy London released a version of the song as a single in 1975.
- Derrick Harriott released a version of the song on his 1982 album, Acid Rock.
- Haywoode released a version of the song as a single in 1987. It was a minor hit for her and spent a week on the UK chart, peaking at No. 98.
- Glen Brown and Lloyd Parks released a version of the song on Brown's 1989 compilation album, Boat to Progress! The Original Pantomine Vocal Collection 1970-74. [sic]
- Elton John and Paul Young released a version of the song on John's 1993 album, Duets.
- Helen Watson released a version of the song on her 1999 album, Doffing.
- Yo La Tengo released a version of the song as the B-side to their 2006 single "Mr. Tough".
- American Music Club released a version of the song on their 2008 album, Atwater Afternoon.
- Joe Pernice released a version of the song on his 2009 album, It Feels So Good When I Stop.
- Cliff Richard and Percy Sledge released a version of the song on Richard's 2011 album, Soulicious.
- The Golden Cups released a version of the song on their 1968 debut album.
- The Raconteurs performed a live rendition of the song at FAME Studios in 2019 for the Amazon Music Originals series (also available on YouTube).
- Little Joe and the Latinaires released a version of the song to their 1968 album, Unbeatable!

== Sampled versions ==
- Grand Daddy I.U. sampled the song on his song "Something New" which was featured on his 1990 album, Smooth Assassin.
- Tragedy Khadafi sampled the song on his 1990 song "Live & Direct From The House Of Hits".
- Hi-C sampled the song on his song "I'm Not Your Puppet" which was featured on his 1991 album, Skanless. The song reached #63 on the Billboard Hot 100.

== In media ==
- In 1994, the version sung by Elton John and Paul Young was used in the Brazilian telenovela A Viagem, produced by Rede Globo.
- James and Bobby Purify's version was used in the 1995 film My Family.
- Bobby Womack released a version that was featured in the 2000 film Meet the Parents.
- James & Bobby Purify's version was in the 2008 film Soul Men.
- In 2023, James and Bobby Purify's version appeared in the seventh episode of the fifth season of the black comedy crime drama series Fargo.
