= Back to Reality =

Back to Reality may refer to:

- Back to Reality (TV series), a 2004 British reality programme
- "Back to Reality" (Red Dwarf), a 1992 TV episode
- "Back to Reality" (song), by Intelligent Hoodlum (Tragedy Khadafi), 1990
- Back to Reality, an album by Las Guanábanas, 1998
- Back to Reality, an album by Slaughter, 1999
