= Back to Reality (song) =

Single by Intelligent Hoodlum

from the album Intelligent Hoodlum
- B-side: "Live & Direct From The House Of Hits"
- Released: October 2, 1990
- Recorded: 1990
- Genre: Hip hop
- Length: 10:49
- Label: A&M
- Songwriter(s): Percy Chapman, Marlon Williams, Craig Curry
- Producer(s): Marley Marl, C.J. Macintosh

Tragedy Khadafi singles chronology
"'Black & Proud (Remix)'" (1990)	"Back to Reality" (1990)	"'The Posse (Shoot 'Em Up)'" (1993)

Professional ratings
Review scores
Source	Rating
Allmusic	link

Back to Reality is the second single released from Intelligent Hoodlum debut album, Intelligent Hoodlum. Produced by Marley Marl and remixed by Marl and C.J. Macintosh, the single peaked at 10 on the Hot Rap Singles.

== Single track listing ==
1. "Back to Reality"
2. "Back to Reality" (Marleys Mix)
3. "Back to Reality" (UK Mix)
4. "Back to Reality" (UK Dub)
5. "Live & Direct From The House Of Hits" (Feat. Craig G)

== Charts ==
=== Weekly charts ===
Chart (1990)	Peak position
US Hot Rap Singles (Billboard)	10

=== Year-end charts ===
Chart (1990)	Position
UK Club Chart (Record Mirror)	40

== Samples ==
Back to Reality

- "I Get Lifted" by George McCrae
- "Back to Life" by Soul II Soul

Back to Reality (Marleys Mix)

- "Sister Sanctified" by Stanley Turrentine
- "Be Thankful for What You Got" by William DeVaughn
- "Can't Get Away (Special Club "Dub" Mix)" by Carol Williams
- "Somethin' Funky" by Big Daddy Kane

Back to Reality (UK Mix)

- "Be Thankful for What You Got" by William DeVaughn
- "Dancing Room Only" by Harvey Scales

Live & Direct From The House Of Hits

- "I'm Your Puppet" by James & Bobby Purify
- "Just a Friend" by Biz Markie
