= Western Union (song) =

Single by the Five Americans

from the album Western Union/Sound of Love
- B-side: "Now That It's Over"
- Released: January 1967
- Genre: Pop rock; garage rock
- Length: 2:37
- Label: Abnak
- Songwriters: John Durrill; Michael Rabon; Norm Ezell
- Producer: Dale Hawkins

The Five Americans singles chronology
"If I Could" (1966)	"Western Union" (1967)	"Sound of Love" (1967)

Official audio
- "Western Union" on YouTube

"Western Union" is a 1967 song by the American rock band the Five Americans. The single peaked at number 5 on the Billboard Hot 100 in April 1967. It also reached number 7 on the Cash Box Top 100 Singles chart that same month.

== Origins ==
In a March 1967 interview that appeared in Michael Oberman's "Top Tunes" column in the Evening Star newspaper (Washington, D.C.), Norman Ezell, guitarist for the group, explained how they came up with "Western Union". "Mike Rabon, our lead guitar player, was just fooling around with his guitar when he came up with a unique sound," Norman said. "It sort of reminded us of a telegraph key. That's when we decided to write 'Western Union.'"

The song tells of a Dear John letter being communicated by telegram, a service of the Western Union company.

== Chart performance ==
=== Weekly charts ===
Chart (1967)	Peak position
Australia Go-Set	19
Belgium (Ultratop 50 Wallonia)	15
Canada Top Singles (RPM)	3
France (SNEP)	37
Netherlands (Dutch Top 40)	19
New Zealand (Listener)	4
Rhodesia (Lyons Maid)	10
South Africa (Springbok Radio)	10
UK (Record Retailer)	55
US Billboard Hot 100	5
US Cash Box Top 100	7
US Record World 100 Top Pops	6
West Germany (GfK)	36

=== Year-end charts ===
Chart (1967)	Rank
Canada (RPM)	81
US Billboard Hot 100	58
US Cash Box Top 100	82

== Cover versions ==
In 1967, the Strangers' recording reached number 30 in Australia.

In 1967, the Searchers' recording reached number 19 in the Netherlands and number 55 in the UK.

In 2000, The Avalanches would sample Western Union on "Etoh" from their album Since I Left You. Pharrell Williams would sample the song as well, first as part of The Neptunes on "Wasting Time" by Brent Faiyaz featuring Drake, followed by "Cash In Cash Out" with 21 Savage and Tyler, the Creator.
