= Thomas Boggs (disambiguation) =

Thomas Boggs (1944–2008) was an American musician.

Thomas Boggs may also refer to:

- Thomas Hale Boggs Sr. or Hale Boggs (1914–disappeared 1972), American politician from Louisiana and majority leader of the U.S. House of Representatives
- Thomas Hale Boggs Jr. (1940–2014), American lawyer and lobbyist, son of Hale Boggs
- Thomas Oliver Boggs (1824–1894), Colorado pioneer and founder of Boggsville, Colorado
- Tom Boggs (poet) (1905–1952), American poet, editor, and novelist
- Tommy Boggs (1955–2022), American baseball player
