= Let Love Come Between Us =

Single by James & Bobby Purify

from the album The Pure Sound of The Purifys - James & Bobby
- B-side: "I Don't Want to Have to Wait"
- Released: August 1967
- Genre: Pop-soul
- Length: 2:23
- Label: Bell
- Songwriter(s): Joe Sobotka, Johnny Wyker
- Producer(s): Papa Don Enterprises

James & Bobby Purify singles chronology
"I Take What I Want" (1967)	"Let Love Come Between Us" (1967)	"Do Unto Me" (1968)

"Let Love Come Between Us" is a song written by Joe Sobotka and Johnny Wyker and performed by James & Bobby Purify. The song was featured on their 1968 album, The Pure Sound of The Purifys - James & Bobby. The song was produced by Papa Don Enterprises.

== Chart performance ==
"Let Love Come Between Us" reached #18 on the US R&B chart, #23 on the Billboard Hot 100, and #51 on the UK Singles Chart in 1967.

== Other versions ==
- The Rubber Band, featuring one of the song's writers, Wyker, released the original version of the song as a single in 1966.
- Mark Williams covered the song on his 1975 album, Mark Williams.
- Peters and Lee released a version of the song as a single in 1977.
- Mavis Staples released a version of the song on her 1979 album, Oh What A Feeling.
- Delbert McClinton released a version of the song as a single in 1981.
