= Papa Don Schroeder =

American record producer

- Born: Gerald Don Schroeder; December 29, 1940; Pensacola, Florida, US
- Died: November 15, 2019 (aged 78)
- Occupation(s): Radio station owner, record producer, songwriter, singer
- Years active: 1959–1970s (as performer, writer and producer)
- Website: http://talk790.com/

Gerald Don Schroeder (December 29, 1940 – November 15, 2019), known professionally as Papa Don Schroeder, was an American radio station owner and former record producer, radio personality, and singer-songwriter, who was responsible for producing hit singles in the 1960s and 1970s by James & Bobby Purify, Carl Carlton, and others.

== Biography ==
He was born in Pensacola, Florida, and attended Pensacola High School. He grew up intending to study to become a doctor, and as a teenager worked during the summer as a lifeguard at Castle Park Resort in Holland, Michigan, where he started performing songs he had written. He was heard by advertising executive Harry Smart, who recommended Schroeder to his friend Ewart Abner of Vee-Jay Records in Chicago. As a result, Schroeder recorded a single for Vee-Jay produced by Calvin Carter, featuring his song "Melanie", so becoming the R&B label's first white artist. Released in 1959, the record became a minor regional hit.

Schroeder attended the University of Tennessee, and began doing promotions and working as a DJ for radio station WATE, through which he met John Richbourg (John R.) who became his manager. He recorded further singles under his own name in Nashville with producer Shelby Singleton for Philips Records, and at Sound Stage 7 Records. He also worked with Bobby Hebb in Nashville, and recorded with Gary S. Paxton in The Hollywood Argyles, as well as preparing demos in Muscle Shoals. He had shows on radio station WKDA, and then started work for the Cedarwood music publishing company in Nashville, where he wrote songs with Mel Tillis and Wayne Walker, and produced demos. In 1963 he had his first songwriting success with "Those Wonderful Years", a country music hit for Webb Pierce, but then left to return to Pensacola.

Working for radio station WBSR, he became a local celebrity with the top-rated show in the area (the "Papa Ding-Dong Diddley Daddy Debatably Daring Dig'in Out Dash'n Dip Dig'in Don Schroeder Show"), mainly playing R&B music for a predominantly white audience. Schroeder said:

"I dreamed of bringing white people and black people together... and we did it...and packed it out... and never had a problem. It was phenomenal. That was a phenomenal statement in the '60s.... I played 75 percent black music and about 25 percent white music, and the white music I played was white music that I thought my black audience would put up with. But I was playing the black music I knew the white people would love, if they could just hear it. And that’s why we did the ratings we did."

He formed his own production company, Papa Don Productions, and arranged a record distribution deal with Larry Uttal of Bell Records. Schroeder also began promoting concerts by black musicians such as James Brown and Wilson Pickett. In 1966 he produced Mighty Sam McClain's version of Don Gibson's song "Sweet Dreams", recorded with engineer Dan Penn at Muscle Shoals. Through McClain, Schroeder was introduced to James Purify and Robert Lee Dickey, and produced the pair's recordings as James & Bobby Purify, including the hits "I'm Your Puppet" – written by Dan Penn and Spooner Oldham – and "Shake A Tail Feather", which was the first of Schroeder's productions to be recorded at Chips Moman's American Sound Studio in Memphis, Tennessee. Schroeder also co-wrote several of the Purifys' recordings, and recorded two albums with the pair. He also recorded and produced soul singer Oscar Toney, Jr.

In 1968, he built his own studio in Pensacola, but failed to recruit the musicians to make it successful. After disagreements with James Purify, he closed down his record production business in 1969. In 1970, he took ownership of radio station WPNN in Pensacola, and remains the station president. He returned to record production in the mid-1970s, producing Carl Carlton's hit version of "Everlasting Love" as well as further tracks by James and Bobby Purify.

Schroeder died from throat cancer in 2019, aged 78.
