= Live at Savoy, 1981 =

Live album by Kim Carnes
- Released: 1999
- Recorded: August 25, 1981
- Venue: The Savoy, New York City
- Genre: Pop rock
- Length: 1: 26: 53
- Label: King Biscuit Flower Hour

Kim Carnes chronology
Gypsy Honeymoon: The Best of Kim Carnes (1993)	Live at Savoy, 1981 (1999)	Chasin' Wild Trains (2004)

Live at Savoy, 1981 is a live album by American singer-songwriter Kim Carnes, recorded at the Savoy nightclub in New York on August 25, 1981, as part of her Mistaken Identity tour. The album was released in 1999 by King Biscuit Flower Hour Records, a label owned by the American radio program King Biscuit Flower Hour.

== Background and release ==
Live at Savoy was recorded during Carnes' promotional tour in support of Mistaken Identity (1981). The concert featured premiere performances of "Say You Don't Know Me" and "Thrill of the Grill" which appeared on her next album Voyeur (1982). Her live performance of "Still Hold On" was included as a bonus track on the 2001 reissue of Voyeur by One Way Records/EMI-Capitol Special Markets. The recording first aired on September 20, 1981.

== Critical reception ==
Professional ratings
Review scores
Source	Rating
AllMusic	2.5/5 stars

Jason Ankeny of AllMusic rated the album two and a half out of five stars and stated that her performances "capture Carnes at the peak of her career".

In a contemporary review of the concert for The New York Times, Stephen Holden wrote that Carnes had an "effervescent stage presence" and "could hardly be a more fitting representative of the shifting sounds and attitudes of mainstream Los Angeles pop".

== Track listing ==
No.	Title	Writer(s)	Length
1.	"Under My Thumb"	Mick Jagger; Keith Richards	5:50
2.	"Break the Rules Tonite (Out of School)"	Kim Carnes; Dave Ellingson; Wendy Waldman	3:15
3.	"Hit and Run"	Donna Weiss; Jackie DeShannon	3:53
4.	"Do You Love Her"	Carnes	5:14
5.	"More Love"	Smokey Robinson	4:05
6.	"Cry Like a Baby"	Dan Penn; Spooner Oldham	3:35
7.	"Miss You Tonite"	Carnes	6:36
8.	"Say You Don't Know Me"	Carnes	5:03
9.	"Mistaken Identity"	Carnes	5:36
10.	"Dwayne"		3:33
11.	"Draw of the Cards"	Carnes; Ellingson; Bill Cuomo; Val Garay	5:48
12.	"Still Hold On"	Carnes; Ellingson; Eric Kaz; Waldman	5:38
13.	"What's Your Name"	Gary Rossington; Ronnie Van Zant	11:21
14.	"Bette Davis Eyes"	Weiss; DeShannon	4:22
15.	"Thrill of the Grill"	Carnes	4:16
16.	"Tear Me Apart"	Nicky Chinn; Mike Chapman	4:14
17.	"Don't Be Cruel"	Otis Blackwell	4:34

== Personnel ==
- Kim Carnes – lead vocals
- Steve Goldstein – keys
- Jerry Peterson – saxophone
- Josh Leo – guitar
- Craig Hull – guitar
- Bryan Garofalo – bass guitar
- Bill Cuomo – Prophet
- Craig Krampf – drums
- M. L. Benoit – percussion
- Daniel Moore – backing vocals
- David Ellingson – backing vocals
