= Dreams to Remember: The Otis Redding Anthology =

Compilation album by Otis Redding
- Released: August 18, 1998
- Recorded: at Macon, Georgia, Muscle Shoals, Alabama and at Stax Studios, Memphis, Tennessee from 1960 to November 22, 1967. Tracks 20–24 on disc 2 recorded live at The Monterey International Pop Festival, Monterey, California on June 17, 1967
- Genre: R&B/Soul
- Label: Rhino
- Producer: Gary Stewart, David Gorman, Bill Inglot

Professional ratings
Review scores
Source	Rating
Allmusic	4.5/5 stars

Dreams to Remember: The Otis Redding Anthology is a 1998 compilation album by American soul singer-songwriter Otis Redding. Advertised as a stopgap between the greatest hits album Very Best Of and the boxset Otis! The Definitive Otis Redding, this two-disc album offers most of Redding's greatest hits, a few album tracks and 5 live recordings taken from The Monterey International Pop Festival.

== Reception ==
In his review for Allmusic, Stephen Thomas Erlewine states that while the music on the album is superb, it tries to be both a best of and a box set and so fails at both.

== Commercial performance ==
The album sold in excess of 40,000 copies and in 2003 was voted 147th on the 500 greatest albums of all time by Rolling Stone.

== Track listing ==
Disc 1
No.	Title	Writer(s)	Length
1.	"Shout Bamalama" (performed by Redding, The Pinetoppers)	Otis Redding	1:57
2.	"These Arms of Mine"	Redding	2:33
3.	"That's What My Heart Needs"	Redding	2:40
4.	"Pain in My Heart"	Naomi Neville	2:25
5.	"Come to Me"	Redding, Phil Walden	2:47
6.	"Security"	Redding	2:38
7.	"Chained and Bound"	Redding	2:43
8.	"Mr. Pitiful"	Steve Cropper, Redding	2:40
9.	"That's How Strong My Love Is"	Roosevelt Jamison	2:25
10.	"I've Been Loving You Too Long"	Jerry Butler, Redding	3:15
11.	"Respect"	Redding	2:10
12.	"Ole Man Trouble"	Redding	2:38
13.	"A Change Is Gonna Come"	Sam Cooke	4:16
14.	"(I Can't Get No) Satisfaction"	Mick Jagger, Keith Richards	2:46
15.	"Down in the Valley"	Bert Berns, Joseph C. Martin, Marvin Chivian, Solomon Burke	2:59
16.	"Shake"	Cooke	2:41
17.	"My Girl"	Smokey Robinson, Ronald White	2:56
18.	"You Don't Miss Your Water"	William Bell	2:52
19.	"Cupid"	Cooke	3:10
20.	"I Can't Turn You Loose"	Redding	2:48
21.	"Just One More Day"	Steve Cropper, Redding, Robinson	3:30
22.	"My Lover's Prayer"	Redding	3:11
23.	"Cigarettes and Coffee"	Butler, Thomas, Walker	4:00
24.	"It's Growing"	Warren Moore, Robinson	2:49
25.	"Fa-Fa-Fa-Fa-Fa (Sad Song)"	Cropper, Redding	2:43
26.	"Try a Little Tenderness"	James Campbell, Reginald Connelly, Harry M. Woods	3:47

Disc 2
No.	Title	Writer(s)	Length
1.	"You Left the Water Running"	Oscar Frank, Rick Hall, Dan Penn	2:47
2.	"Trick or Treat"	Isaac Hayes, David Porter	3:13
3.	"Tramp" (performed by Redding, Carla Thomas)	Lowell Fulson, Jimmy McCracklin	3:03
4.	"Lovey Dovey" (performed by Redding, Thomas)	Ahmet Ertegün, Memphis Edward Curtis	2:36
5.	"Let Me Come on Home"	Al Jackson Jr., Redding, Booker T. Jones	2:55
6.	"I Love You More Than Words Can Say"	Eddie Floyd, Jones	2:55
7.	"Merry Christmas, Baby"	Lou Baxter, Johnny Moore	2:29
8.	"The Glory of Love"	William Hill	2:50
9.	"Tell the Truth"	Lowman Pauling	3:13
10.	"I've Got Dreams to Remember"	Zelma Redding, Otis Redding, Joe Rock	3:15
11.	"The Happy Song (Dum-Dum)"	Cropper, Redding	2:45
12.	"Hard to Handle"	Allen Jones, Alvertis Isbell, Redding	2:20
13.	"Amen"	Traditional	3:06
14.	"Direct Me"	Cropper, Redding	2:19
15.	"Love Man"	Redding	2:18
16.	"Look at That Girl"	Edward Morris, Sandy Stewart	2:38
17.	"I'm a Changed Man"	Cropper, Redding	2:22
18.	"The Match Game"	Porter, Redding	2:53
19.	"(Sittin' On) The Dock of the Bay"	Cropper, Redding	2:49
20.	"Shake [live]"	Cooke	2:57
21.	"Respect [live]"	Redding	3:00
22.	"I've Been Loving You Too Long [live]"	Butler, Redding	4:08
23.	"(I Can't Get No) Satisfaction [live]"	Jagger, Richards	3:33
24.	"Try a Little Tenderness [Live]"	Campbell, Connelly, Woods	5:13

== Personnel ==
- Otis Redding – vocals, guitar
- Carla Thomas – vocals
- Booker T. Jones – guitar, piano, electronic organ
- Steve Cropper – guitar, piano, bass
- Johnny Jenkins – guitar
- Charles "Packy" Axton – tenor saxophone
- Andrew Love – tenor saxophone
- Joe Arnold – tenor saxophone
- Gilbert Caples – tenor saxophone
- Gene Parker – tenor saxophone
- Tommie Lee Williams – tenor saxophone
- Floyd Newman – baritone saxophone
- Wayne Jackson – trumpet
- Sammie Coleman – trumpet
- Gene "Bowlegs" Miller – trumpet
- Ben Cauley – trumpet
- Isaac Hayes – piano, organ
- Lewis Steinberg – bass
- Donald "Duck" Dunn – bass
- Wayne Cochran – bass
- Al Jackson Jr. – drums
- Rick Hall – drums
- Phil Walden – tambourine
- William Bell
- David Porter – background vocals
- The Pinetoppers
