= Rabon =

Rabon is a surname. Notable people with the surname include:

- Bill Rabon (born 1951), American politician
- František Raboň (born 1983), Czech cyclist
- Mike Rabon (born 1943), American musician
- Jacob Rabon IV, better known as Alpharad (born 1995), American YouTuber and eSports personality

== See also ==
- Jiu River
