= Thomas Boggs =

American drummer

Thomas Boggs (July 16, 1944 – May 5, 2008) was an American musician, playing with the Box Tops, and restaurateur in Memphis, Tennessee.

== Early life ==
Boggs was born in Wynne, Arkansas, and moved to Memphis at age 7. He graduated from Central High School, and then Memphis State University, currently named the University of Memphis.

He played in local bands, including Tommy Burk and the Counts, and Flash and The Board of Directors, who opened for Paul Revere and the Raiders. However, his big break came as the drummer with the Box Tops from 1968 to 1970, which gained minor international acclaim. While he was with them, they had a No. 28 hit single with "Sweet Cream Ladies" (1969).

== Later life ==
After the music business, Boggs began working in the restaurant business. In the early 1970s, he worked at T.G.I. Friday's. One former employee's account who knew Thomas Boggs personally, "Thomas was the manager at the Dallas, Texas TGI Friday's, Old Town Shopping center location on Greenville Ave, helping open new restaurants. Tom was a great manager and a motivator of people. He didn't just appear as a manager, but a friend. He was highly motivated and was viewed as a driving force behind the growth of TGI Friday's in their early years. Once when entering his office at the restaurant several people were standing at attention in pledge formation with their hats on their heart. I asked, What is going on? (while The Letter played on the radio in the background). The cashier mentioned "Didn't you know? Thomas was the drummer for the Box Tops". Later I was surprised when opening the album "Non Stop" by the Box Tops and there was Tom Boggs. Noted as the road manager for the band while at the same time always keeping a solid drum beat". In 1975, he moved back to Memphis, catching on as a bartender at Huey's, then a local bar.

Boggs quickly became a manager, then a partner two years later. His experience with Friday's helped transition Huey's into a restaurant. With Boggs at the helm as CEO, Huey's would blossom into a chain of nine pubs in Memphis. He would also become a partner in several other Memphis area restaurants including the Half Shell, Tsunami, Folk's Folly and the Prime Cut Shoppe.

As a former Memphis Restaurant Association president and 2007 recipient of its Civic and Community Leadership Award, Boggs was known for his civic contributions: board member and former president of the Memphis Zoological Society; advisory board member of the Memphis Food Bank; chairman and board member of the Memphis Convention & Visitors Bureau; and chairman and board member of Memphis In May.

He died in 2008 from cancer in Memphis.
