= Gypsy Honeymoon: The Best of Kim Carnes =

Compilation album by Kim Carnes
- Released: February 9, 1993
- Genre: Pop rock
- Label: EMI

Kim Carnes chronology
Checkin' Out the Ghosts (1991)	Gypsy Honeymoon: The Best of Kim Carnes (1993)	Live at Savoy, 1981 (1998)

Singles from Gypsy Honeymoon: The Best of Kim Carnes
- 1. "Gypsy Honeymoon" Released: 1993

Gypsy Honeymoon: The Best of Kim Carnes is a compilation album by American singer-songwriter Kim Carnes, released on February 9, 1993, by EMI. It contains some of Carnes' hit singles, some album tracks and three new recordings. The three duets with Kenny Rogers, Barbra Streisand and Gene Cotton had never appeared on an album by Carnes before this release.

The title track was released as a single in 1993 and reached no. 65 in Germany.

== Background ==
Carnes noted that Gypsy Honeymoon is "a best-of, not a greatest hits", including some of Carnes' personal favourites and tracks requested by her fans. Gypsy Honeymoon featured two brand new tracks, "Chain Letter" and "Don't Cry Now", and a re-recording of the title track which originally appeared on Carnes' previous studio album Checkin' Out the Ghosts (1991), released exclusively in Japan. Carnes stated that she was so proud of the track that she wanted to re-record it so that it could reach a wider audience. "Gypsy Honeymoon" was released as the lead single and it peaked at no. 65 on the German Top 100 Singles chart. In 2002, Carnes provided backing vocals for a version of "Gypsy Honeymoon" recorded by Collin Raye on his album Can't Back Down (2002). "Don't Cry Now" was remixed and released as a promotional single later in 1993.

On March 4, 1994, Michelle Wright performed "Gypsy Honeymoon" at the St. Joseph Civic Arena in Missouri as a tribute to John Candy, who died earlier that day.

== Critical reception ==
Professional ratings
Review scores
Source	Rating
AllMusic	4.5/5 stars
Calgary Herald	C+
Encyclopedia of Popular Music	3/5 stars
The Tampa Tribune	3/4 stars

Writing for The Tampa Tribune, Michael Dunn described Gypsy Honeymoon as "a bright 'hello' and a good buy", noting that Carnes has "an ear for good tunes and a stylish vocal delivery". In The Morning Call, Larry Printz observed that the album is missing a number of her Top 40 hits, with the compilation instead acting as "a portrait of a smart singer-songwriter" with numerous album tracks. He complimented the three new songs, opining that they promise "more great work from Carnes in the 90s". The Calgary Herald complimented Gypsy Honeymoon on its inclusion of hits "More Love", "Crazy in the Night (Barking at Airplanes)" and "Bette Davis Eyes", but opined that Carnes' voice "starts to wear thin" over time.

In a retrospective review, Stephen Thomas Erlewine of AllMusic described Gypsy Honeymoon as "a fairly satisfying collection for most casual fans", noting the absence of "Draw of the Cards" and "Voyeur".

== Track listing ==
No.	Title	Writer(s)	Producer	Length
1.	"Chain Letter"	Larry Tagg; Jenni Muldaur	Don Dixon	4:09
2.	"Gypsy Honeymoon"	Kim Carnes; Collin Ellingson	Dixon	4:07
3.	"Don't Cry Now"	Carnes; Collin Ellingson; Donna Weiss	Dixon	3:50
4.	"Still Hold On"	Carnes; David Ellingson; Eric Kaz; Wendy Waldman	Val Garay	4:37
5.	"Bette Davis Eyes"	Weiss; Jackie DeShannon	Garay	3:45
6.	"Mistaken Identity"	Carnes	Garay	4:47
7.	"More Love"	Smokey Robinson	George Tobin	3:38
8.	"Thrill of the Grill"	Carnes	Garay	3:23
9.	"It Hurts So Bad"	Carnes	Daniel Moore; David Ellingson; Carnes	3:03
10.	"Don't Fall in Love with a Dreamer" (with Kenny Rogers)	Carnes; David Ellingson	Larry Butler; Kenny Rogers	3:40
11.	"Rough Edges"	Carnes; David Ellingson	Carnes; Bill Cuomo	4:46
12.	"I'll Be Here Where the Heart Is"	Carnes; Duane Hitchings; Craig Krampf	Keith Olsen	4:43
13.	"Crazy in the Night (Barking at Airplanes)"	Carnes	Carnes; Cuomo	3:37
14.	"Make No Mistake, He's Mine" (with Barbra Streisand)	Carnes	Cuomo; Carnes	4:09
15.	"You're a Part of Me" (with Gene Cotton)	Carnes	Steve Gibson	3:44
Total length:				59:58

== Personnel ==
Credits for tracks 1–3 adapted from liner notes.

=== Musicians ===
- Kim Carnes – lead vocals (1–3), backing vocals (2)
- Don Dixon – production (1–3), bass (1–3), backing vocals (1), harmony vocals (3)
- Steve Goldstein – keys (1–3)
- Tim Pierce – electric guitar (1–3), EBow (1)
- Steven Soles – acoustic guitar (1–3), mandolin (1–2)
- Denny Fongheiser – drums (1–3)
- Jim Brock – percussion (1–3)
- Andrea Robinson – backing vocals (1)
- Maxine Waters Willard – backing vocals (2)
- Julia Tillman Waters – backing vocals (2)

=== Technical ===
- Peter Doell – engineering
- Richard Bosworth – vocal engineering
- Eric Rudd – assistant engineering
- Dan Bosworth – assistant engineering
- Lori Gillman – production assistant
- Don Dixon – mixing
- Mark Williams – mixing
- Paul Lani – remixing (1)

=== Design ===
- Henry Marquez – art direction
- Loren Hanes – photography
- Diane Cuddy – design
- Mark Cozza – hand lettering
- George Newell – makeup
- Kathy Blizzard – hair stylist
