= Robbie Lane and the Disciples =

Canadian rock band

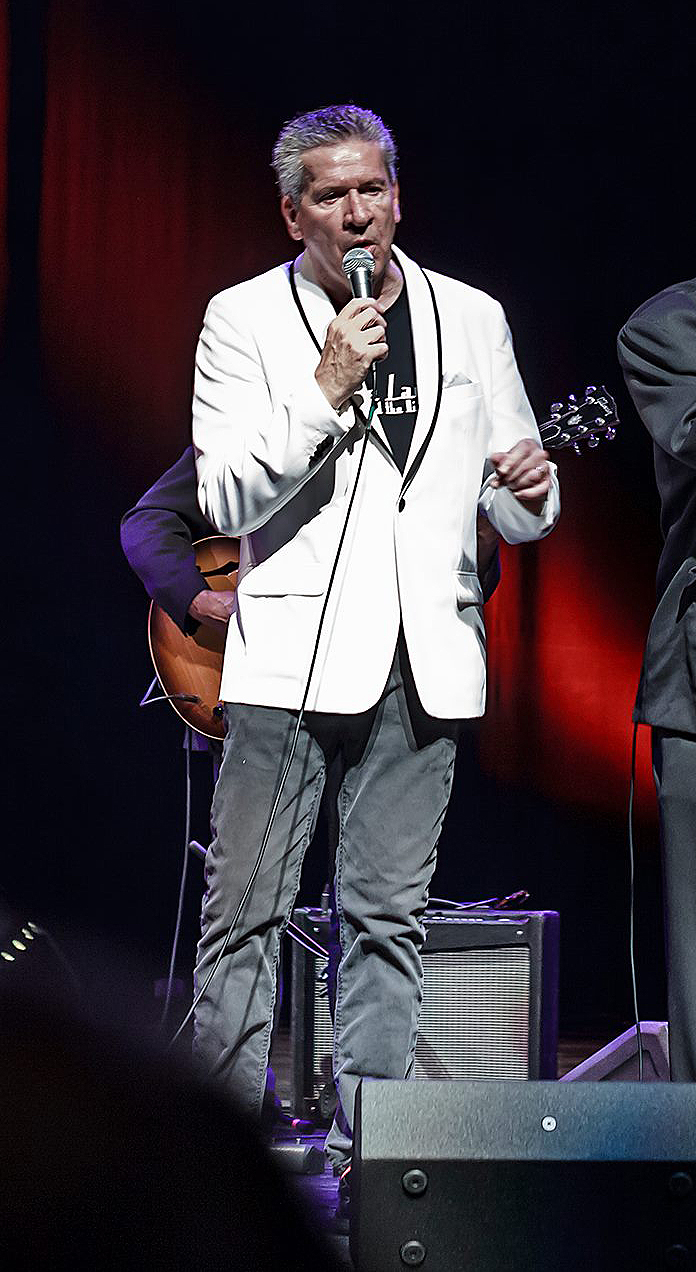
- Robbie Lane at The Living Arts Centre in Mississauga, ON. Canada, September 30, 2017

Background information
- Also known as: The Butterfingers
- Origin: Toronto, Ontario, Canada
- Genres: Rock n' Roll, R&B
- Years active: 1963–present
- Label: Hawk Records / Capitol Records / Hallmark Records / Pacemaker Records
- Members: Robbie Lane [Robin Curry] (vocals), Steve Shelski (guitar), Glenn Hill (harmonica, vocals), Joe Rigon (drums), Brian Fraser (piano), Phil Skladowski (sax), Ed Zankowski (sax), Joe Allen, Joe Agnello (bass), Ewan Divitt (trumpet)
- Past members: Domenic Troiano (guitar), Stan Szelest (piano), Sonny Milne (drums), Marty Fisher (piano), Gene Trach (bass guitar), Bert Herriston (sax / flute), William Cudmore (harmonica / sax / vocals), Terry Bush (guitar), Kirk Shearer (drums)
- Website: www.robbielane.com

Robbie Lane and the Disciples is a Canadian rock band that peaked in the 1960s. A cover of Neil Sedaka's "What Am I Gonna Do" was their biggest success, reaching #10 in 1966. They also recorded an early version of the hit song "Soul Deep" in 1966.

== Career ==
Beginning as Ronnie Hawkins' backup band, Robbie Lane & the Disciples later gained attention as the band for Canadian TV network CTV's music variety show It's Happening. Composed of guitarist Terry Bush, drummer Doug Copeland, harmonica player William Cudmore, keyboardist Paul Denyes, vocalist Robbie Lane, tenor saxophonist Paul Mifsud, and bassist Gene Trach, the group recorded several singles during the mid-1960s. After an unsuccessful solo career in the mid-1970s, Robbie Lane (aka Robin Curry) and the band re-formed in the mid-1980s.

== Singles ==
- "Fannie Mae" (1963) #17 [CHUM]
- "Ain't Love a Funny Thing" (1964) #12 [CAN] #16 [CHUM]
- "Sandy" (1965) #36 [CAN]
- "What Am I Gonna Do" (1966) #10 [CAN]
- "It's Happening"
- "You Gotta Have Love" (1966) #56 [CAN]

The chart positions are from either the RPM Canadian singles chart or CHUM (Toronto) charts.
