= Gypsy Honeymoon =

1993 single by Kim Carnes

Single by Kim Carnes

from the album Gypsy Honeymoon: The Best of Kim Carnes
- Released: 1993
- Length: 4:09
- Label: EMI
- Songwriters: Kim Carnes; Collin Ellingson
- Producer: Don Dixon

Kim Carnes singles chronology
"Independent Girl" (1991)	"Gypsy Honeymoon" (1993)	"One Beat at a Time" (2004)

Licensed audio
- "Gypsy Honeymoon" on YouTube

Gypsy Honeymoon is a song by American singer-songwriter Kim Carnes, co-written with her son Collin Ellingson. Originally recorded for her album Checkin' Out the Ghosts in 1991, it was re-recorded and released as the lead single from Gypsy Honeymoon: The Best of Kim Carnes in 1993.

== Charts ==
Chart performance for "Gypsy Honeymoon"
Chart (1993)	Peak position
Canada Adult Contemporary (RPM)	26
Canada Top Singles (RPM)	74
Germany (GfK)	65

== Personnel ==
Credits adapted from the Gypsy Honeymoon: The Best of Kim Carnes liner notes.

=== Musicians ===
- Kim Carnes – lead vocals, backing vocals
- Don Dixon – production, bass
- Steve Goldstein – keys
- Tim Pierce – electric guitar
- Steven Soles – acoustic guitar, mandolin
- Denny Fongheiser – drums
- Jim Brock – percussion
- Maxine Waters Willard – backing vocals
- Julia Tillman Waters – backing vocals

=== Technical ===
- Peter Doell – engineering
- Richard Bosworth – vocal engineering
- Eric Rudd – assistant engineering
- Dan Bosworth – assistant engineering
- Lori Gillman – production assistant
- Don Dixon – mixing
- Mark Williams – mixing
