= Black & Proud =

Single by Intelligent Hoodlum

from the album Intelligent Hoodlum
- B-side: "Intelligent Hoodlum"
- Released: May 24, 1990
- Genre: Hip hop
- Length: 3:51
- Label: A&M
- Songwriter(s): Percy Chapman, Marlon Williams
- Producer(s): Marley Marl

Tragedy Khadafi singles chronology
"Black & Proud" (1990)	"Back to Reality" (1990)

Professional ratings
Review scores
Source	Rating
Allmusic	2.5/5 stars

"Black & Proud (Remix)" is the first single released from Tragedy Khadafi's debut album, Intelligent Hoodlum (named after his then-stage name, Intelligent Hoodlum). Produced and remixed by Marley Marl, the single peaked at 29 on the Hot Rap Singles.

== Single track listing ==
1. "Black & Proud" (Remix)
2. "Black & Proud" (A Capella)
3. "Intelligent Hoodlum" (Edit)

== Charts ==
Chart	Position
Hot Rap Singles	# 29
