= Intelligent Hoodlum =

Studio album by Tragedy Khadafi
- Released: July 10, 1990
- Studio: Marley's House of Hits, New York
- Genre: Hip hop
- Length: 45:12
- Label: A&M/PolyGram
- Producer: Marley Marl, Large Professor, Joe Burgos

Tragedy Khadafi chronology
Intelligent Hoodlum (1990)	Tragedy: Saga of a Hoodlum (1993)

Singles from Intelligent Hoodlum
- 1. "Black and Proud" Released: 1990; 2. "Back to Reality" Released: 1990

Intelligent Hoodlum is the debut studio album by the American rapper Intelligent Hoodlum, later known as Tragedy Khadafi. It was released on A&M Records in 1990.

It peaked at number 52 on the Billboard Top R&B/Hip-Hop Albums chart.

== Critical reception ==
Professional ratings
Review scores
Source	Rating
AllMusic	4.5/5 stars
The Encyclopedia of Popular Music	4/5 stars
RapReviews	8/10

Jon Young, in Trouser Press, wrote that "backed by hard, unadorned beats from ace producer Marley Marl, [Intelligent Hoodlum] leads a furious chant against racism in 'No Justice, No Peace' and bristles with righteous anger on 'Black and Proud.'" In an article titled "The 10 Best Forgotten New York Hip-Hop Records," The Village Voice wrote: "Skeletal, smart, politically literate and seemingly effortless, Intelligent Hoodlum’s (a/k/a Tragedy Khadafi) debut is the stuff of conscious hip-hop dreams."

== Track listing ==
All tracks are written by Percy Chapman and Marlon Williams, except "Keep Striving" by Percy Chapman, Marlon Williams, and Darren Lighty.

No.	Title	Producer(s)	Length
1.	"Intelligent Hoodlum"	Marley Marl	5:02
2.	"Back to Reality"	Marley Marl	3:41
3.	"Trag Invasion"	Marley Marl, Large Professor	3:33
4.	"No Justice, No Peace"	Marley Marl	4:02
5.	"Party Animal"	Marley Marl	2:52
6.	"Black and Proud"	Marley Marl	3:51
7.	"Game Type"	Marley Marl, Large Professor, Joe “Fatal” Burgos	4:10
8.	"Microphone Check"	Marley Marl	4:00
9.	"Keep Striving"	Marley Marl	4:07
10.	"Party Pack"	Marley Marl	3:07
11.	"Arrest the President"	Marley Marl	4:13
12.	"Your Tragedy"	Marley Marl	2:34

2007 re-release bonus tracks
No.	Title	Length
13.	"Live Motivator" (featuring Biz Markie and Big Daddy Kane)	4:33
14.	"In Control Radio Show Freestyle"	4:52
15.	"Back to Life (Marley Remix)"	2:17
16.	"Go Queensbridge"	2:52
17.	"The Super Kids Live at Hip Hop USA"	4:14

== Charts ==
Chart	Peak position
US Top R&B/Hip-Hop Albums (Billboard)	52
