= Cry Like a Baby =

Single by The Box Tops

from the album Cry Like a Baby
- B-side: "The Door You Closed to Me"
- Released: February 1968
- Recorded: 1968
- Studio: American (Memphis, Tennessee)
- Genre: Bubblegum pop
- Length: 2:35
- Label: Mala
- Songwriters: Dan Penn, Spooner Oldham
- Producer: Chips Moman

The Box Tops singles chronology
"Neon Rainbow" (1967)	"Cry Like a Baby" (1968)	"Choo Choo Train" (1968)

"Cry Like a Baby" is a 1968 song written by Dan Penn and Spooner Oldham, and performed by The Box Tops. The song reached No. 2 in April 1968 on the Billboard Hot 100 chart, a position it held for two weeks. "Cry Like a Baby" also reached No. 2 on Cashbox for one week. It stayed on the Hot 100 for 15 weeks and Cashbox for 14 weeks. It was awarded a gold disc for selling over one million copies in the United States.

== History ==
Spooner Oldham explained in an interview how the song came to be:

Dan Penn was producing The Box Tops, he had produced a #1 record called "The Letter". He recorded that in Memphis when he and I were both living there. So he calls me one day and says, "Spooner, will you help me try to write a song for Alex (Chilton) and the Box Tops?" He says, "People have sent me some songs, but I don't think any of them really fit. This record company's been after me about three weeks for a follow-up single." And I said, "Sure, I'll try to help write a song for you." We got together in the studio one evening with our little notes of our five or ten best ideas or titles. We each pulled one out and they eventually ended up in the garbage.

The next morning, we were getting tired and decided to call it quits. So we locked the doors, turned out the lights in the studio, turned off the instruments. Went across the street to the little café - name was Porky's or something like that - and ordered breakfast. I remember I was putting my head on the table. There was nobody in there, I don't think, but us and the cook. And I tiredly put my head on the table, my arms under my head, just for a few seconds. Then I lifted my head up and looked at Dan, and because I felt sorry that he needed another record and we were no help to each other that evening, I said, "Dan, I could just cry like a baby." And he says, "What did you say?" And I said it again. He says, "I like that." So unbeknownst to me, we had a song started. By the time we walked across the street back to the studio, we had the first verse written. When we got in, he turned on the lights and the recorder, and I turned on the Hammond organ. He got his guitar out, and we put on a quarter-inch 90-minute tape, and we finished the song, just recorded a demo.

The next day or two in the morning Alex Chilton came in. I was so tired and weary I didn't know what we had, if anything. I played the little tape demo to him and he smiled and reached out his hand, shook my hand, so I knew he liked it, anyway. And then we got in the studio and recorded it shortly, I think that day.

In contrast with "The Letter", which was played by the band, "Cry Like a Baby" used the Memphis Boys, American Sound Studio's house band, in the instrumental backing, which features session guitarist Reggie Young playing an electric sitar. Author Peter Lavezzoli cites this part as an example of the widespread influence of Indian classical music on rock and pop music in the late 1960s, in the wake of the Beatles' popularisation of the sitar in songs such as "Within You Without You", from their 1967 album Sgt. Pepper's Lonely Hearts Club Band. Oldham played keyboards on "Cry Like a Baby" in addition to co-writing it. Chilton, who sang lead vocals on the song, was only 17 years old at the time of recording. This version of the song also features a female backup chorus, a brass section, a string section, bass guitar, organ, piano, and drums.

"You left the water running now", the last line sung by Chilton, is a reference to another composition co-written by Penn.

Billboard described the single as an "easy beat rhythm item" that "is loaded with play and sales potential". Cash Box said that "Effective use of electric sitar and a rhythmic appeal somewhat like that of 'The Letter' gives the Box Tops a solid sound on their third offering." Record World said "the hot rock in the grooves will have teens grooving."

== Chart performance ==
The Box Tops version
Chart (1968)	Peak position
US Cashbox	2
US Billboard Hot 100	2
Australia	46
Canada	3
New Zealand	16
UK Singles Chart	15

Kim Carnes' version of the song spent 8 weeks on the Hot 100 in 1980, peaking at No. 44.

== Cover versions ==
- 1968: The Royal Guardsmen, as part of a medley with "The Letter", on the album Snoopy for President
- 1968: Betty Wright, on the album My First Time Around (Atco SD-33-260)
- 1968: Barry St. John, on the album According to St. John (Major Minor MMLP43)
- 1969: Arthur Alexander, non-album single
- 1971: Petula Clark, on the album Warm and Tender (Warner Bros. Records WS 1885)
- 1980: Kim Carnes, on the albums Romance Dance and Live at Savoy, 1981
