= Gary Talley =

American songwriter

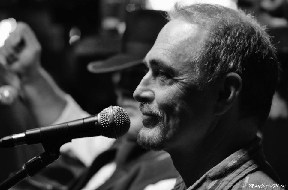
- Talley in 2013

Background information
- Born: August 17, 1947 (age 79); Memphis, Tennessee, U.S.
- Genres: Rock 'n' roll, blues, blue-eyed soul, indie rock
- Occupations: Musician, singer, songwriter, educator
- Instruments: Guitar, vocals
- Website: http://garytalley.com

Gary Talley (born August 17, 1947) is an American guitarist, singer, songwriter and author. He began his career as lead guitarist for the Grammy-nominated group The Box Tops who were famous for hits like "The Letter", and "Cry Like a Baby".

== Career ==
After his initial stint with The Box Tops, Talley played with musicians Jerry Butler, Billy Lee Riley, Hank Ballard, and Ace Cannon at the Sounds of Memphis Studio and later at Universal Studios also in Memphis. His reputation led him to the larger market of Atlanta in 1972, where he toured with Pat Boone, Tennessee Ernie Ford, Dobie Gray, Freda Payne, Billy Joe Royal, and many others.

Talley relocated to Nashville in 1981 where he recorded with Willie Nelson, Tammy Wynette, Waylon Jennings, Sam Moore (of the duo Sam and Dave), and others. He has written songs recorded by Keith Whitley, The Box Tops, James Cotton, T. G. Sheppard, Fish Heads & Rice and others. He has continued writing and teaching, while at the same time playing television appearances, live events or touring with artists like Billy Preston, Sam Moore, Pam Tillis, Brenda Lee, Tammy Wynette, Rufus Thomas, Tim McGraw, The Drifters, Sam "the Sham" Samudio, David Lee Murphy, Bobby Whitlock, Tracy Nelson, Mac Gayden, Bobby Bare, Ray Vega, Deirdre Reilly, the Hombres, Jason D. Williams, James Carr, Al Watkins, and Little Eva among others.

Publications like Acoustic Guitar and American Songwriter have published cover stories, articles and lessons about his career as a guitar instructor. In 1999, Talley created “Guitar Playing for Songwriters” the first instructional guitar video designed for songwriters. His specialized technique is tailored to accommodate the needs of songwriters. His students have included stars like Pam Tillis, and Sherrié Austin, Amanda Hunt-Taylor, Rory Bourke, Monty Powell, Holly Lamar and Tom Douglas.

After a six-year hiatus following the death of The Box Tops lead singer, Alex Chilton in 2010, Gary and remaining original bass player Bill Cunningham reunited The Box Tops and began touring in 2016. In 2017 The Box Tops joined The Happy Together Tour with The Turtles, The Association, The Cowsills, Chuck Negron of Three Dog Night, and Ron Dante of The Archies. The Summer tour played 48 cities across the U.S. and entertained over 200,000 fans. Gary continues to teach guitar when he's not touring with The Box Tops, and plays various live shows and recording sessions in Nashville.

On November 1, 2018, Talley was inducted into the Memphis Music Hall Of Fame, as a founding member of The Box Tops.

In 2020, Talley began accompanying the singing of his 93-year old mother Nita Talley in a series of Youtube videos. These songs, especially the old-style gospel numbers, on which they sing harmony with Belinda Lee Leslie, have been made into CDs, and a portion of the proceedings go to the Wounded Warrior Project in honor of Gary's late father, Charles Talley. In 2022, at the age of 95, with three CDs available, Nita Talley was still recording with Gary Talley.
