= Abnak Records =

American record label (1963-71)

Abnak Records was a record label based in Dallas, Texas, owned by Fort Worth insurance man John Howard Abdnor Sr., active from 1963 to 1971, begun mainly as an outlet for his son John H. Abdnor Jr., primarily as Jon & Robin. The most success for the label came from the group The Five Americans. Subsidiary labels were Startime Records, Jetstar Records, and Britannia Records. Their final album was distributed by Uni Records and was by Michael Rabon & Chocktaw, released in 1971, which featured members of The Five Americans.

Sundazed Music owns the Abnak catalogue today.
