= Mike Rabon =

American musician (1943–2022)

Michael Lee Rabon (April 16, 1943 – February 11, 2022) was an American musician. He was the lead guitarist and lead vocalist of the 1960s hit group the Five Americans, and was co-writer of the group's hits including "Western Union" and "I See the Light".

== Early life ==
Rabon was born in Port Arthur, Texas, in April 1943 but moved to southeastern Oklahoma in the first year of his life. His father and mother, both Oklahoma natives, taught school in a tiny community in Oklahoma called Spencerville with a population of about 300, before later moving to Hugo, Oklahoma. It was there that Rabon taught himself to play guitar. By age 12, he had joined a local group called the Buckaroos.

After graduating from high school in 1961, he joined the Army Reserve for a 6 months stint in Fort Jackson, South Carolina. After the Army he enrolled in college at Southeastern State University in Durant, Oklahoma, graduating in school administration.

== The Five Americans ==
In college, he formed the beginnings of the Five Americans. The band was originally named the Mutineers but was later changed to the Five Americans to combat the constant British Invasion influence in the mid-1960s. The group became successful charting 5 records: "I See the Light", "Evol Not Love", "Sound of Love", "ZipCode", and "Western Union", the last covered by the Ventures, the Strangers (Australia), and the Searchers (England), and also used in the film Vanilla Sky (2001) starring Tom Cruise.

Mike Rabon had a successful touring career afterwards, released two albums that sold well, and played guitar for the Tyler, Texas, pop group Gladstone, whose "A Piece of Paper" reached No. 45 in October 1972. Rabon later formed a group called Michael Rabon and Choctaw which also included former Five Americans drummer Jimmy Wright. One album was released by Uni in the early 1970s to good reviews but was mostly overlooked by the label due to promotional and legal difficulties.

After 10 years in the music business, Rabon went back to college and obtained his master's degree in administration. Rabon was later involved in education technology in his hometown of Hugo, and taught in local schools.

== Personal life and death ==
Rabon married Cara Beth Whitworth in 1979. He died on February 11, 2022, at the age of 78.
