= Danny Smythe =

American drummer

Danny Smythe (August 25, 1948 – July 6, 2016) was an American drummer and a founding member of The Box Tops, an American rock band.

Smythe was born in Memphis, Tennessee. With the Box Tops he had major hits on the US Billboard Hot 100 chart, such as the #1 hit in 1967, "The Letter", and the #2 hit in 1968, "Cry Like a Baby". By January 1968, he returned to school. After his time with the band, he studied art and was a freelance illustrator for advertising agencies. The original lineup of the Box Tops reunited in 1996. He designed the cover of the band's album Tear Off! (1998).

Smythe died in 2016 at the age of 67 in Plainfield, Illinois.
