= Neon Rainbow =

Single by The Box Tops

from the album The Letter/Neon Rainbow
- B-side: "Everything I Am"
- Released: October 1967 (U.S.)
- Recorded: 1967
- Studio: American Sound Studio (Memphis, Tennessee)
- Genre: Pop rock, blue-eyed soul
- Length: 3:04
- Label: Mala
- Songwriter: Wayne Carson Thompson
- Producer: Dan Penn

The Box Tops singles chronology
"The Letter" (1967)	"Neon Rainbow" (1967)	"Cry Like a Baby" (1968)

"Neon Rainbow" is a song written by Wayne Carson Thompson and made famous by Memphis blue-eyed soul band The Box Tops.

== About ==
The track is featured on The Letter/Neon Rainbow. The song starts with the lyrics "The city lights, the pretty lights, They can warm the coldest nights" and as they suggest, the song is about neon signs that come on at night and make even the city's coldest nights seem warm. The lyrics continue "But in the daytime everything changes, Nothing remains the same. No one smiles anymore, And no one will open his door. Until the night time comes. And then the..." suggesting that the city's inhabitants stay inside during the day and come out only at night.

Billboard described the single as a "swinging rhythm item with compelling lyric." Record World said that "it looks and sounds like [the Box Tops'] second big single release." Cash Box called it "a lower-keyed [than 'The Letter'] mid-speed rock side with an easy-going rhythm that grows into a hypnotizing sales magnet" with "exceptional vocal power and grand lyrical draw."

Petula Clark recorded the song for her 1970 album Memphis and Rita Pavone made an Italian version with the title "Il mondo nelle mani" (The world in the hands).

== Personnel ==
- Alex Chilton – vocals
- Bobby Womack – acoustic guitar
- Other instrumentation by the Memphis Boys
  - Reggie Young – electric guitar
  - Bobby Emmons – piano, Vox Continental organ
  - Tommy Cogbill – bass guitar
  - Gene Chrisman – drums
- Arranged by Mike Leech

== Afterlife of song ==
From September 2009, "Neon Rainbow" was featured in the TalkTalk TV advertising campaign, and is their hold music.

== Chart performance ==
Cashbox	US Hot 100	Australia	Canada	UK	NZ
#24	#24	#30	#17	57 (Note: Chart position is from the official UK "Breakers List".)	#5

Billboard Hot 100 (9 weeks): Reached #24

Cashbox (10 weeks): 57, 43, 34, 27, 26, 24, 28, 44, 56, 58
