= Five Americans =

American rock band

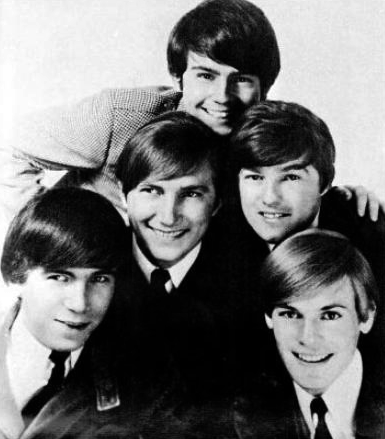
- The Five Americans in 1967

Background information
- Also known as: The Mutineers
- Origin: Durant, Oklahoma, U.S.
- Genres: Rock; pop rock; garage rock
- Years active: 1965–1969
- Past members: Mike Rabon; John Durrill; Norman Ezell; Jim Grant; Jimmy Wright

The Five Americans was a 1960s American rock band, best known for their song "Western Union", which reached number five in the U.S. Billboard chart and was their only single to chart in the Top 20. In Canada, they had three in the Top 20.

== Career ==
The Mutineers formed in Durant, Oklahoma, Southeastern State College in 1962. The band members crossed paths at the university, and began performing a repertoire of Bo Diddley and Duane Eddy standards within the campus. In 1963, the band recorded their debut single, "Jackin' Around", in Dallas, Texas, an instrumental which received extensive airplay in their college. The British Invasion influenced The Mutineers to include Beatles numbers to their repertoire, a change in outfitting, and a slight emphasis to vocals. However, their most impactful acquisition was their utilization of the Vox Continental electronic organ, a later highlight of the group's sound. While in Dallas, the band achieved prominence playing as a frequent attraction in a venue called The Pirate's Nook. There they came to the attention of Abnak Records, whose president John Abdnor took the group under his wing. Shortly thereafter, the band identified themselves as the Five Americans.

For a short while after their five top singles "I See The Light", "Western Union", "Sound of Love", "Evol - Not Love", and "Zip Code" were released, they toured. However, their manager, Jon Abdnor Sr., owner/president of Abnak Records (and Bankers Management and Services Insurance Co.), was allowed control of their finances. After Abdnor's death in 1996, all rights to their songs should have reverted to the group, but Sundazed Music bought the original tapes. The Five Americans are now receiving their share of the sales and publishing royalties.

=== "Western Union" ===
In a March 1967 interview that appeared in Michael Oberman's "Top Tunes" column in the Evening Star newspaper (Washington, D.C.), Norman Ezell, guitarist for the group, explained how they came up with "Western Union". "Mike Rabon, our lead guitar player, was just fooling around with his guitar when he came up with a unique sound," Norman said. "It sort of reminded us of a telegraph key. That's when we decided to write 'Western Union.'"

== Break-up and the deaths of band members ==
The Five Americans broke up in 1969, after several singles only scraped the Billboard Hot 100 ("7:30 Guided Tour" stalled at No. 96) or missed the chart entirely ("Virginia Girl" managed to "bubble under" at No. 133, while a new version of an earlier hit, entitled "I See The Light '69", couldn't even manage that).

Mike Rabon had a successful touring career afterwards, released two albums that sold well and played guitar for the Tyler, Texas, pop group Gladstone, whose "A Piece of Paper" reached No. 45 in October 1972. He later returned to college, acquired a master's degree in public school administration, and worked in the Oklahoma school systems for 28 years. Rabon married Cara Beth Whitworth in 1979. He died on February 11, 2022, at the age of 78.

John Durrill, the keyboardist, who wrote "Dark Lady" for Cher and "Misery and Gin" for Merle Haggard and was also a member of the band the Ventures, now lives in Los Angeles. As of 2024, he is the group's only surviving member.

Bassist Jim Grant died from a heart attack on November 29, 2004, at the age of 61.

Norman Ezell (guitar and harmonica) became a teacher and minister in Northern California. He died of cancer on May 8, 2010, at the age of 68.

Drummer Jimmy Wright (born James Thomas Wright on December 2, 1947) left the music industry to become a freelance photographer. He died at Texoma Medical Center on January 30, 2012, at the age of 64.

== Discography ==
=== Albums ===
List of studio albums, showing all relevant details
Title	Album details	Peak chart positions	
Title	Album details	US	US CB
I See the Light	Released: 1966; Label: HBR Records; Catalogue: HLP-8503 (mono)/HST-9503 (stereo); Formats: LP	136	—
Western Union	Released: 1967; Label: Abnak Records; Catalogue: ABLP-1967 (mono)/ABST-2067; Formats: LP	121	66
Progressions	Released: 1967; Label: Abnak Records; Catalogue: Abnak ABLP (mono)/ABST-2069 (stereo); Formats: LP	—	—
Now and Then	Released: 1968; Label: Abnak Records; Catalogue: ABST-2071; Formats: LP	—	—

=== Singles ===
Year	Single	Chart positions				Label	Album
Year	Single	US Hot 100	US Cashbox	CAN RPM	AUS	Label	Album
1965	"Show Me" b/w "Love, Love Love"	–	–	–	–	ABC-Paramount 10686	Non-LP tracks
1965	"Say That You Love Me" b/w "Without You"	–	–	–	–	Abnak 106	Non-LP tracks
1965	"I See the Light" b/w "The Outcast"	–	–	–	–	Abnak 109	I See the Light
1966	"I See the Light" b/w "The Outcast" (re-release)	26	41	18	–	HBR 454	I See the Light
1966	"Evol-Not Love" b/w "Don't You Dare Blame Me" (from I See The Light)	52	68	41	–	HBR 468	Progressions
1966	"Good Times" b/w "The Losing Game" (from I See The Light)	–	–	–	–	HBR 483	Non-LP tracks
1966	"It's You Girl" b/w "I'm Gonna Leave Ya"	–	–	–	–	Jetstar 104	Non-LP tracks
1966	"I'm Feeling OK" b/w "Slippin' and Slidin'"	–	–	–	–	Jetstar 105	Non-LP tracks
1966	"Reality" b/w "Sympathy"	–	–	–	–	Abnak 114	Western Union
1966	"If I Could" b/w "Now That It's Over"	–	–	–	–	Abnak 116	Western Union
1967	"Western Union" b/w "Now That It's Over"	5	7	3	35	Abnak 118	Western Union
1967	"Sound of Love" b/w "Sympathy"	36	31	20	–	Abnak 120	Western Union
1967	"Zip Code" b/w "Sweet Bird of Youth"	36	55	50	89	Abnak 123	Progressions
1967	"Stop Light" b/w "Tell Ann I Love Her" (from Western Union)	132	–	–	–	Abnak 125	Progressions
1968	"7:30 Guided Tour" b/w "See Saw Man" (from Western Union)	96	–	–	–	Abnak 126	Now and Then
1968	"No Communication" b/w "The Rain Maker" (from Progressions)	–	–	–	–	Abnak 128	Non-LP tracks
1968	"Lovin' Is Livin'" b/w "Con Man" (from Progressions)	–	–	–	–	Abnak 131	Non-LP tracks
1968	"Generation Gap" b/w "The Source" (Non-LP track)	–	–	–	–	Abnak 132	Now and Then
1969	"Virginia Girl" b/w "Call On Me" (Non-LP track)	133	–	–	–	Abnak 134	Now and Then
1969	"Ignert Woman" b/w "Scrooge"	–	–	–	–	Abnak 137	Now and Then
1969	"I See the Light '69" b/w "Red Cape"	–	–	–	–	Abnak 139	Now and Then
1969	"She's Too Good to Me" b/w "Molly Black"	–	–	–	–	Abnak 142	Now and Then
