= Tragedy: Saga of a Hoodlum =

Studio album by Intelligent Hoodlum
- Released: June 22, 1993
- Recorded: 1992–1993
- Genre: Hip hop
- Label: Tuff Break/A&M/PolyGram Records; 215 389
- Producer: K-Def; Marley Marl; Kool Tee; Epitome of Scratch; Mr. Freaknasti

Intelligent Hoodlum chronology
Intelligent Hoodlum (1990)	Tragedy: Saga of a Hoodlum (1993)	Against All Odds (2001)

Singles from Tragedy: Saga of a Hoodlum
- 1. "The Posse (Shoot 'Em Up)" Released: March 23, 1993; 2. "Grand Groove" Released: July 20, 1993; 3. "Street Life" Released: February 1, 1994

Professional ratings
Review scores
Source	Rating
Allmusic	4.5/5 stars

Saga of a Hoodlum is the second studio album by the hip-hop artist Tragedy Khadafi, then known by the stage name Intelligent Hoodlum.

== Track listing ==
#	Title	Songwriters	Producer(s)	Performer
1	"Shalom a Leck"	P. Chapman, K-Def	K-Def	Tragedy
2	"Hoodlum Intro"			*Interlude*
3	"Underground"	P. Chapman, K-Def	K-Def	Tragedy, Trag-Lo
4	"Funk Mode"	P. Chapman, K-Def	K-Def	Tragedy
5	"Grand Groove"	P. Chapman, K-Def	K-Def	Tragedy
6	"At Large"	P. Chapman, K-Def, M. Williams	K-Def, Marley Marl	Tragedy
7	"Death Row"	P. Chapman, K-Def, M. Williams	K-Def, Marley Marl	Tragedy
8	"Speech [Check The Time]"		Kool Tee	*Interlude*
9	"Mad Brothas Know His Name"	P. Chapman, K-Def, M. Williams	K-Def, Marley Marl	Tragedy
10	"Pass the Teck"	P. Chapman, K-Def	K-Def	Tragedy, Havoc
11	"Street Life"	P. Chapman, Epitome Of Scratch	Epitome of Scratch	Tragedy
12	"Pump the Funk"	P. Chapman, M. Williams	Marley Marl	Tragedy
13	"Role Model"	P. Chapman, Kool Tee	Kool Tee	Tragedy
14	"The Posse [Shoot ’Em Up]"	P. Chapman, Mr. Freaknasti	Mr. Freaknasti	Tragedy, Big Scram
15	"Grand Groove [Bonus Mix]"	P. Chapman, K-Def	K-Def	Tragedy
16	"Funky Roll Outro"			*Interlude*

== Samples ==
Shalom a Leck

- "Piano Man" by Billy Joel
- "I Like It" by The Emotions
- "Long Red" by Mountain

Underground

- "Pot Belly" by Lou Donaldson
- "Cold Feet" by Albert King
- "Get Up, Get Into It, Get Involved" by James Brown

Funk Mode

- "I Like It" by The Emotions
- "Do the Funky Penguin (Part 2)" by Rufus Thomas
- "It's Your Thing" by Lou Donaldson
- "Public Enemy No. 1" by Public Enemy
- "Jam 4 U" by Redman

Grand Groove

- "Ike's Mood I" by Isaac Hayes
- "Hollywood's World" by DJ Hollywood
- "Sing a Simple Song" by Booker T. & the M.G.'s
- "The Rebel" by Marley Marl

At Large

- "Do or Die Bed Sty" by Divine Sounds
- "Dizzy" by Tommy Roe
- "Sing a Simple Song" by Sly & the Family Stone
- "Warm It Up, Kane" by Big Daddy Kane

Death Row

- "Hundred 'An One Year/M'Ria" by Cannonball Adderley
- "Zimba Ku" by Black Heat
- "Bring the Noise" by Public Enemy

Mad Brothers Know His Name

- "Shades of Difference" by LaBelle
- "Just to Get a Rep" by Gang Starr
- "Don't Change Your Love" by The Five Stairsteps
- "You Can Call Me Rover" by The Main Ingredient

Pass the Teck

- "Rapper's Delight" by Sugarhill Gang
- "Curtis' Song" by Lou Donaldson
- "School Boy Crush" by Average White Band
- "Spinning Wheel" by Lonnie Smith
- "It's Your Thing" by Lou Donaldson

Street Life

- "Little Willie Armstrong Jones" by The Last Poets
- "Sneakin' in the Back" by Tom Scott and L.A. Express

Pump the Funk

- "Blind Alley" by The Emotions
- "Sing a Simple Song" by Sly & the Family Stone
- "Do the Funky Penguin (Part 2)" by Rufus Thomas
- "Alwayz Into Somethin'" by N.W.A

Role Model

- "Synthetic Substitution" by Melvin Bliss

Grand Groove (Bonus Mix)

- "It's a New Day" by Skull Snaps
- "Remind Me" by Patrice Rushen

Funky Roll Outro

- "Synthetic Substitution" by Melvin Bliss
- "Uphill Peace of Mind" by Kid Dynamite

== Charts ==
Chart (2003)	Peak position
US Top R&B/Hip Hop Albums	57
US Top Heatseekers	25
