= Wayne Carson =

American singer-songwriter (1943–2015)

- Also known as: Wayne Carson Thompson
- Born: Wayne Carson Head; May 31, 1943; Denver, Colorado, United States
- Died: July 20, 2015 (aged 72) United States
- Genres: Country music
- Occupations: Musician, songwriter, record producer

Wayne Carson (born Wayne Carson Head; May 31, 1943 – July 20, 2015), sometimes credited as Wayne Carson Thompson, was an American country musician, songwriter, and record producer. He played percussion, piano, guitar, and bass. His most famous songs as a writer include "The Letter", "Neon Rainbow", "Soul Deep", and "Always on My Mind" (written with Mark James and Johnny Christopher).

== Biography ==
Carson was born in Denver, Colorado, to Odie and Olivia Head, who played music professionally under the pseudonym Thompson. They met in Nebraska while working for radio station KMMJ, moved to Colorado and eventually to Springfield, Missouri, to join the KWTO music staff. By then, they were better known by their stage names, "Shorty and Sue". Shorty Thompson was perhaps best known around the Ozarks as a member of radio and television mainstay the Tall Timber Boys.

Wayne Carson wanted to pick up a guitar when he was about 14 after hearing a recording by Merle Travis. Even so, he was quickly taken by the newer sound of rock 'n' roll. He lived in several cities, including Denver, as a young man leading bands and moved to Nashville, Tennessee, in 1962. He initially used his parents' stage name, becoming known and credited as Wayne Carson Thompson before dropping the last name and adopting the name Wayne Carson.

In the mid-1960s he returned to Springfield, where he began working with music publisher and promoter Si Siman. Together they pitched songs for years, without success until Siman's friend and producer Chet Atkins took a liking to a tune called "Somebody Like Me" and wanted to have Eddy Arnold record it. Carson was taken aback when he got a call from Arnold, one of the most successful country acts of all time. "Eddie said, 'Wayne, I love the song, but it needs another verse'," Carson recalled. "So I said, 'Well, the third verse goes like this' and I just wrote it right there over the phone." The song became his first number one hit in late 1966 and spent four weeks on top of the country charts.

In 1967, he wrote another major hit, "The Letter", inspired by several pages of lyrics sent by his father. The song was an international hit for The Box Tops and later for Joe Cocker and Leon Russell and was nominated for two Grammys. Carson also wrote "Neon Rainbow" and "Soul Deep" for the Box Tops and "If I Cry" for the junior Memphis band called The Debuts in 1968 with Jimi Jamison as lead singer.

Carson's song "Always on My Mind" won Grammy awards in 1983 for Song of the Year and Best Country Song; in 1982 it reached No. 1 on the Billboard Country charts. The Country Music Association named it the Song of the Year in 1982 and 1983. Also in 1982, The Nashville Songwriters Association International named it Song of the Year and the Academy of Country Music named it Single of the Year.

In 1997 Carson was inducted into the Nashville Songwriters Hall of Fame.

Carson died on July 20, 2015, aged 72, after suffering from various ailments.

== Songs ==
- "Somebody Like Me" – Eddy Arnold
- "Always On My Mind" – Gwen Mcrae(1st release), Brenda Lee, Elvis Presley, Willie Nelson, Pet Shop Boys, Michael Buble, Julio Iglesias, The Stylistics, West End Girls, Johnny Cash & Willie Nelson, John Wesley Ryles
- "The Letter" – The Box Tops, The Beach Boys, Dionne Warwick, Joe Cocker featuring Leon Russell, Al Green, Johnny Rivers, The Arbors, Bachman Turner Overdrive, Bobby Darin, Amii Stewart, and Don Williams.
- "Keep On" – Bruce Channel
- "Who's Julie" – Mel Tillis, Joe Simon
- "She's Actin' Single (I'm Drinkin' Doubles)" – Gary Stewart, Wade Hayes, Ronnie Dunn
- "Neon Rainbow" – The Box Tops, Petula Clark
- "Soul Deep" – The Box Tops, Clarence Carter, Gary U.S. Bonds, Tina Turner, Eddy Arnold, Gin Blossoms, Barbara Lynn
- "The Clown" – Conway Twitty
- "He's Got A Way With Women" - The Crickets
- "Slide Off Your Satin Sheets" – Johnny Paycheck
- "Whiskey Trip" – Gary Stewart
- "No Love At All" – Lynn Anderson, B.J. Thomas
- "Drinkin' Thing" – Gary Stewart, Wade Hayes
- "Barstool Mountain" – Moe Bandy, Wayne Carson, Johnny Paycheck
- "Cussin' Cryin' and Carryin' On" – Ike & Tina Turner
- "You Got What You Wanted" – Ike & Tina Turner
- "I'm Gonna Do All I Can (To Do Right By My Man)" – Ike & Tina Turner
- "That's The Only Way To Say Good Morning" – Ray Price
- "A Horse Called Music" – Willie Nelson, Randy Travis
- "Dog Day Afternoon" – Shelby Lynne
- "I See the Want To in Your Eyes" – Conway Twitty, Gary Stewart
- "(Don't Let The Sun Set On You In) Tulsa" – Waylon Jennings
- "Something's Wrong In California" – Waylon Jennings
- "I Want Some More" – Dan Auerbach, Jon & Robin and the In Crowd
- "I Couldn't Spell !!*@!" – Sam the Sham & the Pharaohs, Homer & Jethro
- "Hollywood" - Alabama
- "Instant Reaction" - Clarence Carter, Bruce Channel
- "Mr. Busdriver" - Bruce Channel
- "Things Go Better With You" - The April Fools
- "You Won't Be There" - The April Fools
- "Do It Again a Little Bit Slower" - Jon & Robin and the In Crowd
- "Dr. Jon (the Medicine Man)" - Jon & Robin and the In Crowd
- "Honey Bee" - Robin of Jon & Robin
- "The Grapes in Mary's Vineyard" - Claude King aka The Grapes in Martha's Vineyard
- "Sandman" - B. J. Thomas, The Box Tops
- "Nine Pound Steel" - Joe Simon

"The Letter", "Neon Rainbow", and "Soul Deep" were all Top 40 hits for the Box Tops; "The Letter" reached No.1 on the Billboard Hot 100 in September 1967. "Do It Again A Little Bit Slower" was a top 20 pop hit in June 1967.
