= Soul Deep (The Box Tops song) =

1969 single by The Box Tops

Single by The Box Tops

from the album Dimensions
- B-side: "(The) Happy Song"
- Released: June 1969
- Recorded: 1969
- Genre: Blue-eyed soul
- Label: Mala
- Songwriter: Wayne Carson-Thompson
- Producers: Tommy Cogbill, Chips Moman

The Box Tops singles chronology
"I Shall Be Released" (1969)	"Soul Deep" (1969)	"Turn on a Dream" (1969)

"Soul Deep"

Single by Eddy Arnold

from the album Love & Guitars
- B-side: "(Today) I Started Loving You Again"
- Released: March 1970
- Genre: Country, Easy Listening
- Length: 2:25
- Label: RCA Victor
- Songwriter: Wayne Carson-Thompson
- Producer: Chet Atkins

Eddy Arnold singles chronology
"Since December" (1969)	"Soul Deep" (1970)	"A Man's Kind of Woman" (1970)

"Soul Deep" is a song originally recorded by Robbie Lane and the Disciples in 1966, but The Box Tops' version became the best known. It was the third of three singles, and the most successful, released from their 1969 Dimensions LP. Lead vocals were provided by Alex Chilton.

The Box Tops' song became an international Top 40 hit, charting modestly at No.22 in the UK and No.18 in the U.S. It reached the Top 10 in Australia (No.7) and in Canada (No.9). "Soul Deep" did best in South Africa, where it reached No.2.

== Background ==
Record World called it "a rhythm-wide, soul-deep song...which is soulful and contemporary".

"Soul Deep" became the group's final U.S. Top 40 entry. Regionally, it peaked at No.3 on KHJ (Los Angeles) on 30 July and on WLS (Chicago) on 18–25 August. "Soul Deep" was also part of the title of the group's 1996 anthology.

== Eddy Arnold cover ==
"Soul Deep" was covered by Eddy Arnold in 1970. The track is included on his album, Love and Guitars. Arnold had a Top 40 Country as well as Adult Contemporary hit with the song in both the U.S. and Canada.

== Other cover versions ==
- Preceding the Box Tops' version by some three years, a version had been recorded by Robbie Lane and the Disciples in 1966 but only released in 1993 on the compilation LP Backtrax.
- Clarence Carter covered it on his album "Testifyin'," released in July 1969.
- Anthony Swete recorded his version of the song which appeared as a B side of his 1969 single, "Backfield in Motion".
- Roberta Flack included it on her 1977 album Blue Lights in the Basement.
- Gary U.S. Bonds recorded the song in 1982, and it became a modest hit in the UK.
- The song was covered in 1994 by the alternative rock band Gin Blossoms, featured on the soundtrack to the film Speed.

== Chart history ==
=== Weekly charts ===
The Box Tops

Chart (1969)	Peak position
Australia (Kent Music Report)	7
Canada RPM Top Singles	9
South Africa (Springbok)	2
UK (The Official Charts Company)	22
U.S. Billboard Hot 100	18
U.S. Cash Box Top 100	13
U.S. Record World	11

Eddy Arnold

Chart (1970)	Peak position
Canada RPM Adult Contemporary	23
Canada RPM Country Songs	44
U.S. Billboard Adult Contemporary	28
U.S. Billboard Country	22

Gary U.S. Bonds

Chart (1982)	Peak position
UK (The Official Charts Company)	59

=== Year-end charts ===
Chart (1969)	Rank
U.S. Billboard Hot 100	98
U.S. Cash Box	87
