= The Letter (Box Tops song) =

1967 song written by Wayne Carson

- UK single picture sleeve

Single by the Box Tops

from the album The Letter/Neon Rainbow
- B-side: "Happy Times"
- Released: August 1967
- Recorded: 1967
- Studio: American Sound Studio (Memphis, Tennessee)
- Genre: Pop rock; blue-eyed soul
- Length: 1:55
- Label: Mala
- Songwriter: Wayne Carson
- Producer: Dan Penn

The Box Tops singles chronology
"The Letter" (1967)	"Neon Rainbow" (1967)

Official audio
- "The Letter" on YouTube

"The Letter" is a song written by Wayne Carson that was first recorded by the American rock band the Box Tops in 1967. It was the group's first and most successful single, reaching number one on the record charts in the United States and Canada. It was also an international success and placed in the top ten in several other countries.

The Box Tops lead vocalist Alex Chilton sang "The Letter" in a gruff blue-eyed soul style. The song launched Chilton's career and inspired numerous cover versions. British rock and soul singer Joe Cocker's 1970 rendition became his first top ten single in the U.S.; several other artists have recorded versions which also reached the record charts.

Rolling Stone magazine included the Box Tops original at number 372 on its list of the "500 Greatest Songs of All Time", and the Rock and Roll Hall of Fame added it to the list of the "500 Songs That Shaped Rock and Roll". In 2011, the single was inducted into the Grammy Hall of Fame.

== Composition and recording ==
Wayne Carson wrote "The Letter", built on an opening line suggested by his father: "Give me a ticket for an aeroplane". Carson included the song on a demo tape he gave to Chips Moman, owner of American Sound Studio in Memphis, Tennessee. When studio associate Dan Penn was looking for an opportunity to produce more, Moman suggested a local group, the DeVilles, who had a new lead singer, sixteen-year-old Alex Chilton. The other four members of the group that played on the session were Danny Smythe on drums, Richard Malone on electric guitar, John Evans on keyboards, and Russ Caccamisi on bass. Penn gave the group Carson's demo tape for some songs to work up. With little or no rehearsal, the group arrived at American Sound to record "The Letter". Chilton recalled:

We set up and started running the tune down ... [Dan] adjusted a few things on the organ sound, told the drummer not to do anything at all except the basic rhythm that was called for. No rolls, no nothin'. The bass player was playing pretty hot stuff, so he didn't mess with what the bass player was doing.

Penn added: "The guitar player had the lick right—we copied Wayne's demo. Then I asked the keyboard player to play an 'I'm a Believer' type of thing". Chilton sang the vocal live while the group was performing; Penn noted: "I coached him [Chilton] a little ... told him to say 'aer-o-plane,' told him to get a little gruff, and I didn't have to say anything else to him, he was hookin 'em, a natural singer." He later explained, "[Chilton] picked it up exactly as I had in mind, maybe even better. I hadn't even paid any attention to how good he sang because I was busy trying to put the band together ... I had a bunch of greenhorns who'd never cut a record, including me".

About thirty takes were required for the basic track. Then Penn had Mike Leech prepare a string and horn arrangement to give it a fuller sound. Leech recalled: "My very first string arrangement was 'The Letter', and the only reason I did that was because I knew how to write music notation ... Nobody else in the group did or I'm sure someone else would have gotten the call." Penn also overdubbed the sound of an airplane taking off to the track from a special effects record that had been checked out from the local library. He explained:

That was a big part of the record ... When I finished it up, I played it for Chips [Moman], and he said, "That's a pretty good little rock & roll record, but you've got to take that airplane off it." I said, "If the record's going out, it's going out with the airplane on it". He said, "Okay, it's your record."

Edwin Pouncey of The Wire described the "sampling" of the overhead jet plane as one of the more notable "pop and rock musique concrète flirtations" of the period.

The DeVilles were renamed the Box Tops and "The Letter", at only 1 minute, 58 seconds, was released by Mala Records, a subsidiary of Bell Records.

== Personnel ==
The Box Tops

- Alex Chilton – lead vocals
- Gary Talley – guitar, backing vocals
- John Evans – keyboards
- Bill Cunningham – bass
- Danny Smythe – drums

Other personnel

- Dan Penn – backing vocals
- Mike Leech – horn and string arrangements

== Chart performance ==
"The Letter" reached number one on the Hot 100 singles chart published by Billboard magazine on September 23, 1967. It remained at the top position for four weeks and Billboard ranked the record the number two song for 1967. The single sold more than one million copies and the RIAA certified it as gold.

1967 singles charts
Chart	Peak position
Australia Go-Set	4
Austria	9
Belgium (Flanders)	2
Belgium (Wallonia)	1
Canada RPM Top Singles	1
Ireland (IRMA)	11
Netherlands (Single Top 100)	3
New Zealand (Listener)	4
Norway	1
UK Singles Chart	5
US Billboard Hot 100	1
US Cash Box Top 100	1

1967 year-end charts
Chart	Rank
Australia Go-Set	37
Canada RPM	1
Netherlands (Dutch Top 40)	44
US Billboard Hot 100	2

1958–2018 charts
Chart	Rank
US Billboard Hot 100	434

== Certifications ==
Certifications for "The Letter"
Region	Certification	Certified units/sales
United Kingdom (BPI)	Silver	200,000^{‡}
United States (RIAA)	Gold	1,000,000^{^}
^{^} Shipments figures based on certification alone.^{‡} Sales+streaming figures based on certification alone.

== Joe Cocker renditions ==
"The Letter"
- US single picture sleeve

Single by Joe Cocker
- B-side: "Space Captain"
- Released: April 1970
- Recorded: March 17, 1970
- Studio: A&M soundstage, Hollywood, California
- Genre: Rock, soul
- Length: 4:10
- Label: A&M
- Songwriter: Wayne Carson
- Producers: Denny Cordell, Leon Russell

Joe Cocker singles chronology
"She Came In Through the Bathroom Window" (1970)	"The Letter" (1970)	"Cry Me a River" (1970)

Audio sample
- file; help

British singer Joe Cocker recorded "The Letter" during the rehearsals for his upcoming American tour on March 17, 1970. Leon Russell and the Shelter People provided the back up; Russell and Denny Cordell produced the recording. A&M Records released it as a single, with "Space Captain" as the B-side. It appeared on the Billboard Hot 100 in April 1970 and eventually reached number seven. "The Letter" became Cocker's first top ten single in the US. In the UK, the single reached number 39.

Cocker performed it (and "Space Captain") during his 1970 performance at the Fillmore East in New York City. Recordings of both songs are included on the live Mad Dogs & Englishmen album, which was released in August 1970 and was a best seller. The tour was filmed, resulting in the Mad Dogs & Englishmen concert film. In 2003, it was released on DVD.

Reviewed in Billboard, it was described as having a "blockbuster blues arrangement that has all the ingredients to up the number back in the Top Ten once again." Cashbox chose the single as a "Pick of the Week" and wrote that this "extended, weighted rendering of the first Box Tops hit adds Joe Cocker's underground-blues spice to the teen material giving it a power for comeback singles energy. Bright find for comeback activity from 'She Came In Through the Bathroom Window.' Explosive top forty effort." Record World wrote "Joe has a real feeling for this Box Tops hit. Good stuff period."

=== Charts ===
1970 singles charts
Chart	Peak
Australia Go-Set	27
Belgium (Ultratop 50 Wallonia)	42
Canada RPM Top Singles	7
Netherlands (Dutch Top 40)	30
Netherlands (Single Top 100)	27
UK Singles Chart	39
US Billboard Hot 100	7
US Cash Box Top 100	5
US Record World 100 Top Pops	7

1970 year-end charts
Chart	Rank
Canada	91

== Other charting renditions ==
In 1979, a version by country singer Sammi Smith reached number 27 on the Billboard Hot Country Singles chart. A year later in the UK, Amii Stewart's version reached number 39 on the UK Singles Chart.

The American vocal group The Arbors released their version of “The Letter” on Date Records in January 1969. It combined their usual smooth vocal performance with semi-psychedelic studio effects, and charted at a peak position of #20 on the Billboard Hot 100 singles chart in the spring of 1969.
