= The Box Tops =

American rock band

- The Box Tops in 1967 (clockwise from left): Bill Cunningham, Danny Smythe, Alex Chilton, Gary Talley, John Evans

Background information
- Also known as: The Devilles
- Origin: Memphis, Tennessee, U.S.
- Genres: Blue-eyed soul; pop rock; psychedelic rock
- Years active: 1967–1970, 1996–2010, 2015–present
- Labels: Mala; Bell; Sundazed
- Members: Gary Talley; Bill Cunningham; Rick Levy; Ron Krasinski; Mike Stewart
- Past members: Alex Chilton; Danny Smythe; John Evans; Rick Allen; Thomas Boggs; Swain Schaefer; Harold Cloud; Bobby Guidotti; Barry Walsh
- Website: boxtops.com

The Box Tops are an American rock band formed in Memphis, Tennessee in 1967. They are best known for the hits "The Letter", "Cry Like a Baby", and "Soul Deep" and are considered a major blue-eyed soul group of the period. They performed a mixture of current soul music songs by artists such as James & Bobby Purify and Clifford Curry; pop tunes like "A Whiter Shade of Pale" by Procol Harum; and songs written by their producers, Dan Penn, Spooner Oldham, and Chips Moman. Vocalist Alex Chilton later fronted the power pop band Big Star and performed as a solo artist.

The Box Tops' music combined elements of soul music and light pop. Their records are prime examples of the styles made popular by Moman and Penn at American Sound Studio in Memphis. Many of their lesser known Top 40 hits, including "Neon Rainbow", "I Met Her in Church", and "Sweet Cream Ladies, Forward March", are considered minor classics. As rock critic Lester Bangs wrote in a review of the group's Super Hits album, "A song like 'Soul Deep' is obvious enough, a patented commercial sound, yet within these strictures it communicates with a depth and sincerity of feeling that holds the attention and brings you back often."

== History ==
=== Foundation and early years as The Devilles ===
The Box Tops began as The Devilles, playing in Memphis. By January 1967 the group was composed of founding member Danny Smythe (drums, background vocal) along with newer arrivals John Evans (guitar, keyboards, background vocal), Alex Chilton (lead vocal, guitar), Bill Cunningham (bass guitar, keyboards, background vocal; son of Sun Records artist Buddy Blake Cunningham and brother of B.B. Cunningham Jr., lead vocalist for 1960s Memphis group The Hombres); and Gary Talley (lead guitar, electric sitar, bass, background vocal). They soon changed their name to The Box Tops to prevent confusion with another band who was recording at the time, The DeVilles of New York.

=== "The Letter" and international success (1967–1969) ===
As the Box Tops, they entered the studio under the guidance of producer Dan Penn to record Wayne Carson Thompson's song "The Letter". Though under two minutes in length, the record was an international hit by September 1967, reaching the Hot 100's number-one position for four weeks, selling over four million copies, earning a gold disc, and receiving two Grammy Award nominations. During October 20–27, 1967, "The Letter" and The Hombres' "Let It Out (Let It All Hang Out)" were 1-2 on the WLS (AM) Silver Dollar Survey, marking a rare quinella involving two brothers of the same family (the Cunningham brothers), each in a different top 40 act.

After "The Letter" the band released "Neon Rainbow", another tune written by Thompson and produced by Penn. An album called The Letter/Neon Rainbow appeared in November 1967. The Box Tops released three albums over a nine-month period from late 1967 to mid 1968. Some of the group's instrumental tracks were performed by session musicians like Reggie Young, Tommy Cogbill, Gene Chrisman, and Bobby Womack at American Sound Studio. However, the actual group members performed on a number of their recordings, including "The Letter", and on all live performances.

By January 1968, John Evans and Danny Smythe returned to school, thereby avoiding the draft. They were replaced by bassist Rick Allen (born January 28, 1946 in Little Rock, Arkansas) from the Gentrys and drummer Thomas Boggs (born July 16, 1944 in Wynne, Arkansas; he died May 5, 2008 in Memphis) from the Board of Directors.

"Cry Like a Baby" was a million-seller in 1968, peaking at No. 2 on the Hot 100. It has been covered by the Hacienda Brothers and Kim Carnes. "I Met Her in Church" and "Choo-Choo Train" were smaller hits released later that year. Near the end of 1968, the band switched producers, with Dan Penn being replaced by the team of Cogbill and Chips Moman. The duo was responsible for producing the band's final 1968 hit, "Sweet Cream Ladies, Forward March" (which debuted on the Hot 100 on Chilton's eighteenth birthday) and all of the band's future releases through 1970.

=== Personnel changes and winding down (1969–1970) ===
In the summer of 1969, Thompson's decidedly upbeat "Soul Deep" became the group's final US Top 40 entry, peaking at No. 18 on the Hot 100 in late August. The follow-up single, "Turn on a Dream", peaked at No. 58 on the Hot 100 and was a No. 29 hit in Canada.

Cunningham left the Box Tops to return to school in August 1969 and was replaced by Harold Cloud on bass (died July 10-2018 in Memphis). Eventually the group's tolerance for the disrespect and fleecing they had endured as teen musicians from managers, lawyers, and promoters came to an end. According to a 2004 article in Puremusic.com written by Talley, a December 1969 British tour was canceled by the band after arriving in London to discover that instead of respecting the rider agreement, the local promoter insisted they play the tour with the opening reggae act's toy drums, public address system amplifiers (instead of proper guitar amplifiers), and a keyboard with a broken speaker.

Finally, in February 1970, the remaining founding members, Talley and Chilton, were ready to move on and disbanded the group. However, the Bell record label kept releasing new Box Tops singles through early 1970, such as "You Keep Tightening up on Me" (No. 92 on the Hot 100 on March 21–28, 1970), using material that had already been recorded.

=== "The Box Tops" brand name continues (1972–74) ===
The Box Tops name (which was under the control of a management company) still had a certain amount of cachet and sales potential in the early 1970s. Lacking original band members, beginning in 1972 new studio groups (whose members remained anonymous) were assembled to record new Box Tops material in Memphis.

These later Box Tops records used some of the same production personnel which had produced and played on the group's earlier recordings, but no original group members. Willie Mitchell's Hi Records released two singles credited to the Box Tops, one in 1972 ("Sugar Creek Woman") and one in 1973 ("Hold On Girl"). In 1974, Tommy Cogbill co-produced one final single credited to the group, "Willobee and Dale", which appeared on the Stax label. None of these singles charted, or received much airplay, and they are generally not included in Box Tops retrospectives.

=== Chilton activity (1976) ===
In 1976, Pickwick Records recorded new versions of "The Letter" and "Cry Like a Baby" using lead vocalist Alex Chilton backed by studio musicians. These tracks were credited to The Box Tops, though Alex Chilton was the only group member involved. Both recordings were released in the UK on a various-artists LP set called The Heart Breakers and Tear Jerkers Collection.

=== Post-Box Tops careers ===
Each of the original members went on to work in the music industry in subsequent years after leaving the Box Tops. Chilton's career path included work performing with Big Star, Tav Falco's Panther Burns, and his solo trio as well as briefly producing groups like The Cramps. Guitarist Talley went on to work in a variety of styles as a session guitarist and songwriter in Memphis, Atlanta, and Nashville. Artists and producers he has worked with have ranged from Billy Preston, Hank Ballard, Chips Moman, Billy Lee Riley, Billy Joe Royal, Webb Pierce, Waylon Jennings, Tracy Nelson, Willie Nelson, and Tammy Wynette to Sam and Dave's Sam Moore, and others. He recorded two albums for Appaloosa Records with the group Fish Heads & Rice, Certified in 1991, and 4 Heads in 1994. Bassist Cunningham won a spot in the White House orchestra in Washington, D.C., after completing his master's degree in music. During his classical music career, he played with some of the world's best performers; at Cunningham's last public classical music performance, for instance, he performed at the White House with Itzhak Perlman and Pinchas Zukerman. In the 1980s, he earned an MBA and changed careers. Evans played occasionally in Memphis groups after the Box Tops, while working as a luthier, eventually switching to a computer network administrator career. Smythe performed in Memphis soul and blues groups in the 1970s, later changing to a career in art by the 1980s, but returned to music performance in the 1990s.

=== One-off & reunion (1989 & 1996–2010) ===
Box Tops in 2001: (left to right: Talley, Chilton, Cunningham, Smythe)

There was a one-off Box Tops charity concert in Nashville at a venue called Ace of Clubs in 1989 for Harold Cloud's family member. The lineup for this show comprised Chilton, Evans, Talley, Harold Cloud (bass), and Gene Houston (drums). At this show the group was also augmented by backup singers Tracy Nelson, Jonell Mosser, and Kim Morrison, and a full horn section.

America's Freedom Festival, in conjunction with Wilsonwood Promotions, presented the Drifters and the Boxtops in concert at the Utah Lake State Park on Friday, June 29, 1990. The concert was sponsored by Food 4 Less, KZOL Oldies 96 FM, and Fred Meyer.

Cunningham next organized a reunion of all the band's original members, including Chilton, in 1996. The group later released a self-produced album of new material recorded at Easley McCain Recording, Tear Off! and resumed performing concerts internationally. The Tear Off! album included a new original by guitarist Talley ("Last Laugh"); covers of Bobby Womack's "I'm in Love", Eddie Floyd's "Big Bird" (often covered in solo concerts since the 1980s by Chilton), and The Gentrys' "Keep on Dancing"; and a new recording of "The Letter". Other songs on the album reflected the band members' varied soul, novelty, rock-and-roll, and country music influences. B.B. Cunningham Jr. played a guitar on the album version of "Trip to Bandstand", his 1959 Memphis novelty single. The album also featured horn arrangements and performances by The Memphis Horns, who subsequently participated in some of the group's concerts. By 2000, John Evans was no longer in the band and was replaced by Nashville session man Barry Walsh. Evans is employed by the University of Memphis.

In 2001 the group contributed a Blondie cover tune to a various artists collection of "songs you never thought you'd hear" called When Pigs Fly.

Sold-out Box Tops concerts in Germany in 2003 were aired on German radio, and the group's 2005 tour schedule showed a number of American dates planned despite the group members' busy careers outside the band. The Box Tops performed their last Memphis concert on May 29, 2009, at The Memphis Italian Festival.

On March 17, 2010, lead vocalist Alex Chilton died of a heart attack.

On July 28, 2010, the remaining Box Tops, Bill Cunningham, Gary Talley, and Ron Krasinski, plus Terry Manning (added for the show) played a tribute concert in honor of Alex Chilton at The City Winery in New York City.

=== Return of The Box Tops ===
In mid 2015, Bill Cunningham and Gary Talley reformed The Box Tops in response to continued requests by fans. On July 6, 2016, Danny Smythe died, aged 67.

September 23, 2017, marked the 50th anniversary of "The Letter" reaching No. 1. Cunningham, Talley, and Rick Levy joined the Happy Together Tour, performing to sold out shows across the U.S., together with Flo and Eddie of The Turtles, Chuck Negron of Three Dog Night, The Association, The Cowsills, and Ron Dante of The Archies.

In 2018, the Box Tops were inducted into the Memphis Music Hall of Fame. Harold Cloud died on July 10, 2018, in Memphis. John Evans died in December 2020 aged 72. Swain Schaefer died on February 16, 2019, aged 70.

== Band member history ==
**Bold** indicates an original member of the band

Current members

- **Gary Talley** – lead guitar, vocals (1967–1970, 1996–2010, 2015–present)
- **Bill Cunningham** – bass, vocals (1967–1969, 1996–2010, 2015–present)
- Rick Levy – rhythm guitar, vocals (2015–present)
- Ron Krasinski – drums (2015–present)
- Mike Stewart – keyboards (2020–present)

Former members

- **Alex Chilton** – lead vocals, rhythm guitar, percussion (1967–1970, 1996–2010; **died 2010**)
- **Danny Smythe** – drums, percussion, backing vocals (1967–1968, 1996–2010; **died 2016**)
- **John Evans** – keyboards, backing vocals (1967–1968, 1996–1999; **died 2020**)
- Thomas Boggs – drums, percussion, backing vocals (1968–1969; **died 2008**)
- Rick Allen – keyboards, backing vocals (1968–1969)
- Harold Cloud – bass (1969–1970, 1989; **died 2018**)
- Bobby Guidotti – drums, backing vocals (1969–1970)
- Swain Schaefer – keyboards, backing vocals (1969–1970; **died 2019**)
- Gene Houston – drums (1989)
- Barry Walsh – keyboards (2000–2010, 2015–2020)

1967–1968	Alex Chilton – lead vocals, rhythm guitar; Gary Talley – lead guitar, backing vocals; John Evans – keyboards, backing vocals; Bill Cunningham – bass, backing vocals; Danny Smythe – drums, backing vocals
1968–1969	Alex Chilton – lead vocals, rhythm guitar; Gary Talley – lead guitar, backing vocals; Rick Allen – keyboards, backing vocals; Bill Cunningham – bass, backing vocals; Thomas Boggs – drums, percussion, backing vocals
Sep. 1969–1970	Alex Chilton – lead vocals, rhythm guitar; Gary Talley – lead guitar, backing vocals; Swain Schaefer – keyboards, backing vocals; Harold Cloud – bass; Bobby Guidotti – drums, backing vocals
1996–1999	Return of the original lineup: Alex Chilton – lead vocals, rhythm guitar; Gary Talley – lead guitar, backing vocals; John Evans – keyboards, backing vocals; Bill Cunningham – bass, backing vocals; Danny Smythe – drums, percussion, backing vocals
2000–2010	Alex Chilton – lead vocals, rhythm guitar; Gary Talley – lead guitar, backing vocals; Bill Cunningham – bass, backing vocals; Danny Smythe – drums, percussion, backing vocals; Barry Walsh – keyboards
2015–2020	Gary Talley – lead guitar, lead and backing vocals; Bill Cunningham – bass, lead and backing vocals; Rick Levy – rhythm guitar, lead and backing vocals; Ron Krasinski – drums, percussion; Barry Walsh – keyboards
2020–present	Gary Talley – lead guitar, lead and backing vocals; Bill Cunningham – bass, lead and backing vocals; Rick Levy – rhythm guitar, lead and backing vocals; Ron Krasinski – drums, percussion; Mike Stewart – keyboards

Timeline

== Discography ==
- The Letter/Neon Rainbow (1967)
- Cry Like a Baby (1968)
- Non-Stop (1968)
- Dimensions (1969)
- Tear Off! (1998)
- Now (2022)

== Other sources ==
- "Box Tops Biographies." Box Tops official website. Accessed June 16, 2005.
- "Box Tops Frequently Asked Questions." Box Tops official website. Accessed June 16, 2005.
- Editors of Rolling Stone (1971). The Rolling Stone Record Review. New York: Pocket Books, pp. 425–426. ISBN 0-671-78531-1 (December 31, 1969, review by Lester Bangs of Box Tops' LPs Super Hits, Dimensions and Non-Stop.)
- "Gary Talley Discography." Gary Talley website. Accessed June 16, 2005.
- Goldfein, Josh. (September 8–14, 1999.) "Box Bottom." Village Voice.
- Gordon, Robert (1995). It Came From Memphis. New York: Pocket Books. ISBN 0-7434-1045-9.
- Smythe, Danny and Evans, John. "Box Tops: The Devilles Story." Box Tops official website. Accessed June 16, 2005.
- Talley, Gary (March 2004). "The Box Tops – Setting the Record Straight: a Firsthand Account." Puremusic.com. Accessed June 16, 2005.
- Whitburn, Joel (1983). The Billboard Book of Top 40 Hits. New York: Billboard Publications, Inc. ISBN 0-8230-7511-7.
- "The Box Tops Biography" IMDb. Accessed April 2, 2019.
- "The Box Tops" Simple Wikipedia. Accessed April 2, 2019.
- DRIFTERS, BOX TOPS TO JOIN IN PROVO CONCERT FRIDAY
