= James & Bobby Purify =

American soul music vocal duo

- James Lee Purify and Robert Lee Dickey

Background information
- Origin: United States
- Genres: Rhythm and blues, soul
- Years active: 1965–1971, 1974–1980s
- Labels: Bell, Casablanca
- Past members: James Lee Purify; Robert Lee Dickey ("Bobby Purify" I); Ben Moore ("Bobby Purify" II)

James & Bobby Purify were an R&B singing duo, whose biggest hits were "I'm Your Puppet" in 1966, which reached number six in the US Billboard Hot 100 chart and in a re-recorded version number 12 in the UK Singles Chart (in May 1976), and "Let Love Come Between Us" in 1967, which reached number 23 in the US. The original "Bobby Purify" (Robert Lee Dickey) was replaced by a second "Bobby Purify" (Ben Moore) in the 1970s.

== Life and career ==
The vocal duo of James Lee Purify (May 12, 1944, Pensacola, Florida, – January 22, 2021, Pensacola) and his cousin Robert Lee Dickey (September 2, 1939, Tallahassee, Florida, – December 29, 2011, Tallahassee) formed in 1965. Dickey had previously worked as a guitarist with the Dothan Sextet. The duo were signed by Don Schroeder to Bell Records in 1966, with Dickey taking his cousin's surname as a stage name. They had immediate success with "I'm Your Puppet", written by Spooner Oldham and Dan Penn and produced by Penn at the FAME Studios in Muscle Shoals, Alabama. The record, released in September 1966, spent 14 weeks on the US chart and sold an estimated one million copies.

Although "I'm Your Puppet" was their biggest hit, they had several further successes on both the Billboard Hot 100 and R&B chart in the US in the late 1960s, including a revival of "Shake a Tail Feather", originally by The Five Du-Tones, and "Let Love Come Between Us". Oliver's cover of the twosome's 1968 hit "I Can Remember", written by Richie Grasso, reached the top 25 of the Billboard Easy Listening Chart in the mid summer of 1970. The duo continued to record and tour together until 1971, when Dickey retired from the music business for health reasons and returned to Tallahassee, where he worked as a city maintenance supervisor as well as singing and playing guitar with his church and as a member of the Bethlehem Male Singers.

James Purify then worked as a solo singer until 1974, when Penn introduced him to Ben Moore (Benjamin Moore Jr., August 7, 1941, Atlanta, Georgia – May 12, 2022). Moore had previously worked with Otis Redding and James Brown and as a member of Jimmy Tig and the Rounders, before forming half of the duo Ben and Spence, who recorded for Atlantic Records in the 1960s. Moore adopted the stage name "Bobby Purify", and the duo toured together until the 1980s. They re-recorded "I'm Your Puppet", which became a number 12 hit in the UK in 1976, and an album, Purify Bros.

Moore began recording as a solo singer for Mercury Records in 1977 and (as Bobby Purify) released an album, Purified, in 1979. He also continued to tour as half of the duo with James Purify. He was nominated for a Grammy Award in 1983, in the category of Best Soul Gospel Performance - Traditional, for the song "He Believes in Me". In 1998, Moore went blind from severe glaucoma and dropped out of the music industry. With the encouragement of Ray Charles, however, he returned to performing and recording. Under the name Bobby Purify, he released an album, Better to Have It, produced by Dan Penn, in 2005. He later joined the gospel band The Blind Boys of Alabama.

James Purify died from complications of COVID-19 in Pensacola, Florida, on January 22, 2021, aged 76.

Ben Moore died on May 12, 2022, at the age of 80.

== Discography ==
=== Albums ===
Year	Album	Record label
1967	James & Bobby Purify	Bell Records
1968	The Pure Sound of The Purifys - James & Bobby	Bell Records
1975	You & Me Together Forever	Casablanca Records
1977	Purify Bros.	Mercury Records

=== Singles ===
Year	Single (A-side, B-side) Both sides from same album except where indicated	Chart positions				Album
Year	Single (A-side, B-side) Both sides from same album except where indicated	US Pop	US R&B	UK	NZ	Album
1966	"I'm Your Puppet" b/w "So Many Reasons"	6	5	―	―	James & Bobby Purify
1967	"Wish You Didn't Have to Go" b/w "You Can't Keep a Good Man Down"	38	27	―	―	James & Bobby Purify
1967	"Shake a Tail Feather" b/w "Goodness Gracious"	25	15	―	―	The Pure Sound of The Purifys - James & Bobby
1967	"I Take What I Want" b/w "Sixteen Tons"	41	23	―	―	The Pure Sound of The Purifys - James & Bobby
1967	"Let Love Come Between Us" b/w "I Don't Want to Have to Wait"	23	18	51	―	The Pure Sound of The Purifys - James & Bobby
	"Do Unto Me" b/w "Everybody Needs Somebody"	73	38	―	―	
1968	"I Can Remember" b/w "I Was Born to Lose Out"	51	42	―	―	Non-album tracks
1968	"Help Yourself (To All of My Lovin')" b/w "Last Piece of Love"	94	31	―	―	Non-album tracks
1968	"Untie Me" b/w "We're Finally Gonna Make It"	―	47	―	―	Non-album tracks
1969	"Section C" b/w "I Don't Know What It Is You Got"	―	―	―	―	Non-album tracks
1974	"Do Your Thing" b/w "Why Love"	―	30	―	―	You & Me Together Forever
1975	"You and Me Together Forever" b/w "A Man Can't Be a Man Without a Woman"	―	―	―	―	You & Me Together Forever
1975	"All the Love I Got" b/w "Why Love"	―	―	―	―	You & Me Together Forever
1976	"I'm Your Puppet" (re-recording) b/w "Lay Me Down Easy"	―	―	12	20	Purify Bros.
1976	"Morning Glory" b/w "Turning Back the Pages"	―	―	27	―	Purify Bros.
1977	"Get Closer" b/w "What's Better Than Love"	―	―	―	―	Purify Bros.
1977	"Slow Dancin'" b/w "Fire's Burning" (as Purify Bros.)	―	―	―	―	Non-album track
"—" denotes releases that did not chart or were not released in that territory.
