= Bill Cunningham (musician) =

American musician (born 1950)

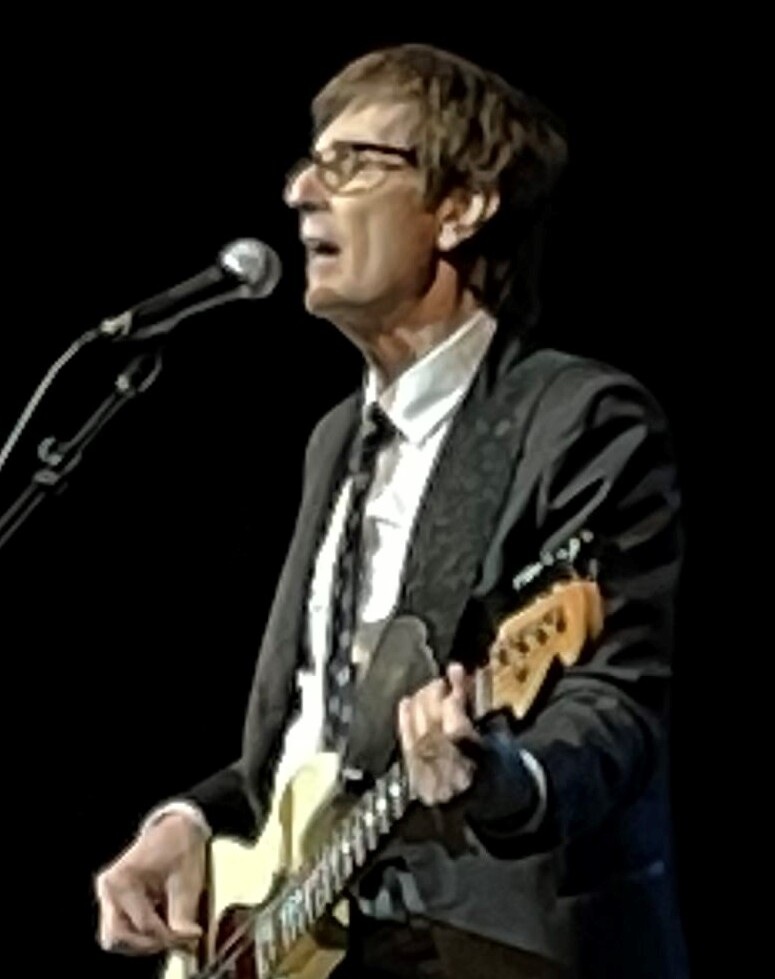
- Cunningham in 2022 with The Box Tops

Background information
- Born: January 23, 1950 (age 76); Memphis, Tennessee, U.S.
- Instruments: Bass guitar, Piano, Organ, Upright Bass, Cello, Vocals

William Cunningham (born January 23, 1950) is the original bass guitarist / keyboardist for the Box Tops.

Cunningham was born in Memphis, Tennessee. He remained a member of the Box Tops until August 1969, when he decided to return to school to get a music degree in performance of the upright bass.

Though Cunningham virtually vanished from the pop music scene after he left the Box Tops, he rose in the ranks of classical musicians, playing in many symphony orchestras (including the Memphis Symphony) and in ballet and opera companies while attending university. During this period he backed artists as diverse as Eddy Arnold, Van Cliburn, Isaac Hayes, the Romeros (Spanish guitarists), Dionne Warwick, and Itzhak Perlman. Cunningham studied in Philadelphia Pennsylvania with Roger Scott, the principal bassist under Eugene Ormandy, in the mid- to late-1970s.

Cunningham played on a number of string sessions for STAX and other Memphis recording artists. One example can be heard on Chris Bell's (Big Star) song "You and Your Sister," featuring Bell's guitar work and vocals, Alex Chilton backing vocal, and Cunningham's string arrangements and upright bass work.

In 1996, Cunningham played the principal role in reforming the original Box Tops. He played bass and shared responsibility for keyboard parts with John Evans on the Tear Off album. Cunningham has toured with the group since 1997.

After a six-year hiatus following the death of The Box Tops lead singer, Alex Chilton in 2010, Bill and Gary Talley, the original guitarist, reunited The Box Tops and began touring in 2016. In 2017 The Box Tops joined The Happy Together Tour with The Turtles, The Association, The Cowsills, Chuck Negron of Three Dog Night, and Ron Dante of The Archies. The Summer tour played 48 cities across the U.S. and entertained over 200,000 fans.

On September 6, 2018, The Box Tops filmed, live before an audience of 1,700, a German TV special in Hamburg Germany. Other guests on the show included Donovan, Klaus Voormann, Melanie, Peter Fonda, and Rowan Atkinson. European broadcast was scheduled for October 2018.

On November 1, 2018, Cunningham was inducted into the Memphis Music Hall Of Fame, as a founding member of The Box Tops. Other inductees that night included, among others, Aretha Franklin and Eddie Floyd. The Box Tops followed Jerry Lee Lewis in performance at the ceremony.
