= Dan Penn =

American soul songwriter (born 1941)

- Born: Wallace Daniel Pennington; November 16, 1941; Vernon, Alabama, U.S.
- Genres: blue-eyed soul, blues, country, soul
- Occupations: Songwriter, producer, singer, musician
- Instrument: Guitar
- Years active: 1960-present
- Labels: Fame, Sire, Repertoire, Proper, Dandy, Last Music, Bell, Happy Tiger

Dan Penn (born Wallace Daniel Pennington, November 16, 1941) is an American songwriter, singer, musician, and record producer, who co-wrote many soul hits of the 1960s, including "The Dark End of the Street" and "Do Right Woman, Do Right Man" with Chips Moman and "Cry Like a Baby" with Spooner Oldham. Penn also produced many hits, including "The Letter", by The Box Tops. He has been described as a white soul and blue-eyed soul singer. Penn has released relatively few records featuring his own vocals and musicianship, preferring the relative anonymity of songwriting and producing. Dan Penn produced an album on Ronnie Milsap in 1970 on Warner Bros. (AKA the Red Album)

== Early life and career ==
Penn grew up in Vernon, Alabama, United States, and spent much of his teens and early twenties in the Quad Cities–Muscle Shoals area. He was a regular at Rick Hall's FAME Studios as a performer, songwriter, and producer. It was during his time with FAME that Penn cut his first record, "Crazy Over You" in 1960, and wrote his first hit, "Is a Bluebird Blue?", which was recorded by Conway Twitty in the same year. The success of the number 6 pop hit "I'm Your Puppet" by James & Bobby Purify in 1966 convinced him that songwriting was a lucrative and worthwhile career.

== Career moves ==
In early 1966, Penn moved to Memphis, began writing for Press Publishing Company, and worked with Chips Moman at his American Sound Studio. Their intense and short-lived partnership produced some of the best known and most enduring songs of the soul genre. Their first collaboration, the enduring classic "The Dark End of the Street" (1967), was first a hit for James Carr and has since been recorded by many others. A few months later, during a recording sessions in which Jerry Wexler introduced Aretha Franklin to FAME Studios and her first major success, the pair wrote "Do Right Woman, Do Right Man" in the studio for her, which went to number 37 in Billboard in 1967. In early 1967, Penn produced "The Letter" for the Box Tops. Along with long-time friend and collaborator Spooner Oldham, Penn also wrote a number of hits for the band, including "Cry Like a Baby," another song that has been covered many times.

== As songwriter ==
Songs written or co-written by Penn include:

- "I'm Your Puppet" by James & Bobby Purify(1966)
- "The Dark End of the Street", recorded by James Carr (1967)
- "Do Right Woman, Do Right Man" by Aretha Franklin(1967)
- "A Woman Left Lonely", originally recorded by Janis Joplin and covered by Charlie Rich
- "Cry Like a Baby", a number 2 hit for The Box Tops(1968)
- "Rainbow Road", recorded by Bill Brandon and Percy Sledge and Marshall Chapman
- "It Tears Me Up", recorded by Percy Sledge
- "Out of Left Field", recorded by Percy Sledge and Hank Williams, Jr.
- "You Left the Water Running", a number 42 R&B hit for Barbara Lynn in 1966, Wilson Pickett, Sam & Dave, Maurice and Mac, Billy Young, also recorded by Otis Redding and released posthumously in 1976
- "Like a Road Leading Home" by Albert King(1971) and Jerry Garcia
- "Slippin' Around", recorded by Clarence Carter and the Detroit Cobras
- "I Hate You", recorded by Ronnie Milsap, Bobby Blue Bland, and Jerry Lee Lewis
- "Sweet Inspiration", a number 5 hit for the Sweet Inspirations in 1968
- "Long Ago", recorded by Bobby Patterson
- "Handy" and "Everyday Livin' Days", recorded by Merrilee Rush
- "Got a Feelin' for Ya", recorded by Kelly Willis
- "I'm Not Through Loving You Yet", recorded by Pegi Young (ex-wife of Neil Young) on her solo album
- "Nobody's Fool", recorded by Alex Chilton
- "Time I Took a Holiday", recorded by Nick Lowe
- "Where You Gettin' It", recorded by Theryl DeClouet (Galactic)
- "Hillbilly Heart", a country hit by Johnny Rodriguez that reached number 5 in the United States and number 2 in Canada in 1976
- "Tearjoint", recorded by Faron Young, released as a single in 1980

== Career:1970s onwards ==
Penn continued writing and producing hits for numerous artists during the 1960s and finally released four sides of his own on Happy Tiger in 1970, including "Nobody's Fool." An album of the same name followed on Bell in 1973. He was coaxed into the studio again in 1993 to record the acclaimed "Do Right Man," for which he reunited with many of his friends and colleagues from Memphis and Muscle Shoals Sound Studio. He also has recently written and produced for the Hacienda Brothers.

He now lives in Nashville and continues to write with Oldham and other contemporaries, such as Donnie Fritts, Gary Nicholson, and Norbert Putnam. Carson Whitsett and Penn have had their collaborations recorded by Irma Thomas and Johnny Adams and often teamed with writers Jonnie Barmett and, later, Hoy Lindsey. The team of Penn, Whitsett, and Lindsey were responsible for the title track of Solomon Burke's album Don't Give Up on Me (also recorded by Joe Cocker), and Penn produced 2005's Better to Have It by Bobby Purify, which featured twelve songs from the team. Oldham and he also tour together as their schedules permit.

In November 2012, the collection The Fame Recordings was released. It included 24 numbers (23 unreleased) Penn had recorded at the FAME Studios in Muscle Shoals, Alabama, between 1964 and 1966. In the fall of 2013, he was inducted in the Alabama Music Hall of Fame.

== Discography ==
- Nobody's Fool (1973)
- Do Right Man (1994)
- Moments From This Theatre (1999): Live recording (with Spooner Oldham) - Recorded live at various venues, November 1998, in Ireland and the United Kingdom
- Blue Nite Lounge (1999)
- Junk Yard Junky (2008)
- The Fame Recordings (2012): Compilation
- The Complete "Live" Duo Recordings - Dan Penn & Spooner Oldham (2015): Double pack. Moments From This Theatr CD plus bonus 22-track DVD recorded live June 1, 2006 at St. James Church, Piccadilly, London
- Close To Me: More Fame Recordings (2016): Compilation
- Living On Mercy (2020)
- Smoke Filled Room (2026)
