= Del Shannon discography =

Artist discography

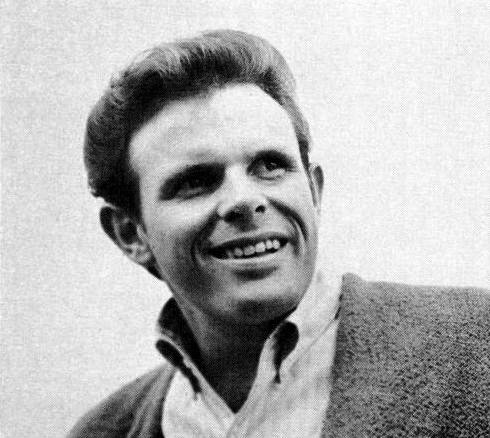
- Studio albums: 15
- Live albums: 2
- Compilation albums: 5
- Singles: 39

Charles Weedon Westover (December 30, 1934 – February 8, 1990), known professionally as Del Shannon, was an American singer-songwriter. His discography comprises 15 original studio albums, one original live album, various compilation and archival projects, and 39 singles.

== Albums ==
=== Studio albums ===
Year	Album	Peak positions		
Year	Album	US	US Cashbox	UK
1961	Runaway with Del Shannon	—	—	—
1963	Hats Off to Del Shannon	—	—	9
1963	Little Town Flirt	12	19	15
1964	Handy Man	—	79	—
1965	Del Shannon Sings Hank Williams	—	—	—
1965	1,661 Seconds with Del Shannon	—	—	—
1966	This Is My Bag	—	—	—
1966	Total Commitment	—	—	—
1968	The Further Adventures of Charles Westover	—	—	—
1978	...And The Music Plays On	—	—	—
1981	Drop Down and Get Me	123	136	—
1991	Rock On!	—	—	—
2006	Home and Away	—	—	—
2017	The Dublin Sessions	—	—	—

=== Live albums ===
Year	Album
1973	Live in England: Recorded live at "The Princess Club," Chorlton-cum-Hardy, Manchester, England, December 1972.
1990	The Final Concert: Recorded live in Australia, March 1989. The title denotes Shannon's last Australian concert, not his final concert during his lifetime, which was at the Fargo Civic Center in Fargo, North Dakota, on February 3, 1990, five days before his death.

== Singles ==
Year	Song title (A-side, B-side) Both sides from same album except where indicated	Chart position									Album
Year	Song title (A-side, B-side) Both sides from same album except where indicated	US	US AC	US Cashbox	US Country	AUS	CAN CHUM/ RPM	CAN RPM AC	NZ	UK	Album
1961	"Runaway" b/w "Jody"	1	—	1	—	1	1	—	1	1	Runaway with Del Shannon
1961	"Hats Off to Larry" b/w "Don't Gild the Lily, Lily" (non-LP track)	5	—	2	—	2	1	—	2	6	Little Town Flirt
1961	"So Long, Baby" b/w "The Answer to Everything"	28	—	38	—	16	—	—	8	10	Non-LP tracks
1961	"Hey! Little Girl" b/w "I Don't Care Anymore" (non-LP track)	38	—	47	—	12	9	—	—	2	Little Town Flirt
1962	"I Won't Be There"	113	—	—	—	—	—	—	—	—	Non-LP tracks
1962	"Ginny in the Mirror"	117	—	123	—	57	—	—	—	—	Non-LP tracks
1962	"Cry Myself to Sleep" b/w "I'm Gonna Move On"	99	—	—	—	—	—	—	—	29	Non-LP tracks
1962	"You Never Talked About Me"	—	—	—	—	96	—	—	—	—	Non-LP tracks
1962	"The Swiss Maid"	64	19	76	—	1	17	—	4	2	Non-LP tracks
1962	"Little Town Flirt" b/w "The Wamboo" (non-LP track)	12	—	11	—	1	9	—	7	4	Little Town Flirt
1963	"Two Kinds of Teardrops" b/w "Kelly"	50	—	55	—	17	—	—	—	5	Little Town Flirt
1963	"From Me to You" /	77	—	67	—	21	13	—	—	—	Non-LP tracks
1963	"Two Silhouettes"	—	—	—	—	21	—	—	—	23	Non-LP tracks
1963	"Sue's Gotta Be Mine" b/w "Now She's Gone"	71	—	68	—	31	11	—	—	21	Non-LP tracks
1964	"That's the Way Love Is" b/w "Time of the Day"	133	—	122	—	—	—	—	—	—	Non-LP tracks
1964	"Mary Jane" b/w "Stains on My Letter" (non-LP track)	—	—	124	—	99	—	—	—	35	Handy Man
1964	"Handy Man" b/w "Give Her Lots of Lovin'"	22	—	19	—	17	10	—	—	36	Handy Man
1964	"Do You Wanna Dance" b/w "This Is All I Have to Give" (non-LP track)	43	—	45	—	27	23	—	—	—	1,661 Seconds with Del Shannon
1964	"Keep Searchin' (We'll Follow the Sun)" b/w "Broken Promises"	9	—	8	—	9	14	—	—	3	1,661 Seconds with Del Shannon
1965	"Stranger in Town" b/w "Over You"	30	—	33	—	83	4	—	—	40	1,661 Seconds with Del Shannon
1965	"Break Up" b/w "Why Don't You Tell Him" (from 1,661 Seconds with Del Shannon)	95	—	83	—	99	—	—	—	—	Non-LP tracks
1965	"Move It on Over" b/w "She Still Remembers Tony"	128	—	121	—	—	—	—	—	—	Non-LP tracks
1966	"I Can't Believe My Ears" b/w "I Wish I Wasn't Me Tonight"	—	—	—	—	—	—	—	—	—	Non-LP tracks
1966	"The Big Hurt" b/w "I Got It Bad"	94	—	93	—	44	29	—	—	—	This Is My Bag
1966	"For a Little While" b/w "Hey! Little Star"	—	—	—	—	—	—	—	—	—	This Is My Bag
1966	"Show Me" b/w "Never Though I Could" (from This Is My Bag)	—	—	—	—	—	—	—	—	—	Total Commitment
1966	"Under My Thumb" b/w "She Was Mine"	128	—	99	—	75	—	—	—	—	Total Commitment
1967	"She" b/w "What Makes You Run" (from Total Commitment)	131	—	—	—	—	—	—	—	—	Non-LP tracks
1967	"Led Along" b/w "I Can't Be True" (from Total Commitment)	—	—	—	—	—	—	—	—	—	Non-LP tracks
1967	"Runaway '67" b/w "He Cheated"	131	—	105	—	14	—	—	—	—	Non-LP tracks
1968	"Thinkin' It Over" b/w "Runnin' on Back"	—	—	—	—	—	—	—	—	—	The Further Adventures of Charles Westover
1968	"Gemini" b/w "Magical Music Box"	—	—	—	—	—	—	—	—	—	The Further Adventures of Charles Westover
1968	"Raindrops" b/w "You Don't Love Me"	—	—	—	—	—	—	—	—	—	Non-LP tracks
1969	"Comin' Back to Me" b/w "Sweet Isabelle"	127	—	—	—	—	—	—	—	—	Non-LP tracks
1970	"Sister Isabelle" b/w "Colorado Rain"	—	—	—	—	—	—	—	—	—	Non-LP tracks
1975	"Tell Her No" b/w "Restless"	—	—	—	—	90	—	—	90	—	Non-LP tracks
1975	"Cry Baby Cry" b/w "In My Arms Again"	—	—	—	—	—	—	—	—	—	Non-LP tracks
1981	"Sea of Love" b/w "Midnight Train"	33	36	33	—	—	—	28	—	—	Drop Down and Get Me
1982	"To Love Someone" b/w "Liar"	—	—	—	—	—	—	—	—	—	Drop Down and Get Me
1985	"In My Arms Again" b/w "You Can't Forgive Me"	—	—	—	56	—	—	—	—	—	Non-LP tracks
1985	"Stranger on the Run" b/w "What You Gonna Do with That Beautiful Body of Yours"	—	—	—	—	—	—	—	—	—	Non-LP tracks
1989	"Walk Away" b/w "Let's Dance"	—	—	—	—	99	—	—	—	—	Rock On!
1991	"Callin' Out My Name" b/w "Hot Love"	—	—	—	—	—	—	—	—	—	Rock On!
1991	"Are You Lovin' Me Too" b/w "One Woman Man" (non-album B-side)	—	—	—	—	—	—	—	—	—	Rock On!
"—" denotes releases that did not chart or were not released in that territory.
