= Live in England =

Live album by Del Shannon
- Released: November 1973
- Recorded: December 2, 1972
- Venue: Princess Club, Manchester, England
- Genre: Rock and roll, country
- Length: 35:23
- Label: United Artists
- Producer: Del Shannon

Del Shannon chronology
The Further Adventures of Charles Westover (1968)	Live in England (1973)	...And The Music Plays On (1978)

Live in England is a live album by Del Shannon recorded in Manchester, England, during tour at Princess Club, in December 1972. It was released in November 1973 by United Artists Records to coincide with the tour.

The album was released on compact disc by Beat Goes On in February, 1996, as tracks 1 through 14 on a pairing of two albums on one CD with tracks 15 through 28 consisting of Shannon's Studio Album from March 1978,...And The Music Plays On. Edsel Records included the album in the 2023 Stranger in Town: A Del Shannon Compendium box set.

== Reception ==
Professional ratings
Review scores
Source	Rating
AllMusic	3/5 stars
The Encyclopedia of Popular Music	2/5 stars

Bruce Eder of AllMusic said Del Shannon's "biggest hits are represented in a smooth '70s fashion, not as powerful as the originals but more mature than the original 1960s versions."

Billboard said "it should bring a lot of younger fans up, but they sound as contemporary as anything coming around."

Cashbox described the album as "A dynamic collection with the live touch-perfect."

Toledo Blade commented that "His choruses are as good as ever, and his country-rock backup fits perfectly with the contemporary sound."

Chris Martin of the Los Angeles Times wrote "Judging from the audience response on this record, there's plenty of room for Shannon in today's nostalgia market".

== Track listing ==
=== Side one ===
No.	Title	Writer(s)	Length
1.	"Hats Off to Larry"		2:12
2.	"Handy Man"	Otis Blackwell, Jimmy Jones	3:14
3.	"The Swiss Maid"	Roger Miller	2:17
4.	"Hey! Little Girl"		2:03
5.	"Little Town Flirt"	Del Shannon, Maron McKenzie	2:54
6.	"Kelly"	Del Shannon, Maron McKenzie	2:58
7.	"Crying"	Roy Orbison, Joe Melson	2:49

=== Side two ===
No.	Title	Writer(s)	Length
1.	"Two Kinds of Teardrops"	Del Shannon, Maron McKenzie	1:37
2.	"Coopersville Yodel"		1:31
3.	"The Answer to Everything"	Burt Bacharach, Bob Hilliard	2:19
4.	"Keep Searchin' (We'll Follow the Sun)"		2:47
5.	"What's a Matter Baby"	Clyde Otis, Johnny Byers	2:58
6.	"So Long Baby"		1:38
7.	"Runaway"	Del Shannon, Max Crook	4:09
