= Little Town Flirt (album) =

Studio album by Del Shannon
- Released: June 1963
- Genre: Rock and roll
- Length: 29:28
- Label: Bigtop
- Producer: Embee Productions

Del Shannon chronology
Hats Off to Del Shannon (1963)	Little Town Flirt (1963)	Handy Man (1964)

Alternate cover
- Little Town Flirt (UK)

Singles from Little Town Flirt
- 1. "Little Town Flirt" Released: November 1962; 2. "Two Kinds of Teardrops" Released: March 1963

Little Town Flirt is the third studio album by American rock and roll singer-songwriter Del Shannon, released in June 1963 by Bigtop Records. His final album for the label, it features the singles "Two Kinds of Teardrops" and "Little Town Flirt". They peaked at numbers 50 and 12, respectively, on the Billboard Hot 100 singles chart, number 55, and 12, on the Cashbox Single Charts in the United States, and numbers 5 and 4, respectively, in the United Kingdom.

Little Town Flirt included multiple cover songs, including "Dream Baby", "Go Away Little Girl", and "Runaround Sue". It also included Del Shannon's second U.S. top five hit, "Hats off to Larry".

The album debuted on the Billboard Top LPs chart in the issue dated June 22, 1963, and remained on the album chart for 26 weeks, peaking at No. 12, his highest position had achieved on that chart. It reached No. 19 on the Cashbox albums chart, where it stayed for 22 weeks. It entered the UK albums chart on November 2, 1963, reaching number 15 over the course of five weeks.

The album was released on Compact Disc by Beat Goes On on August 25, 1998, paired with Shannon's 1964 album Handy Man. Bear Family included also the album in the 2004 Home and Away box set. Edsel Records included the album in the 2023 Stranger in Town: A Del Shannon Compendium box set.

== Reception ==
Professional ratings
Review scores
Source	Rating
AllMusic	3/5 stars
The Encyclopedia of Popular Music	4/5 stars
New Record Mirror	4/5 stars
Disc	4/5 stars

Billboard in its Spotlight of the Week album reviews, "saying the title track is included with "a flock of his other winners".

Cashbox described the album as a "teen-angled dancing and listening disk."

New Record Mirror called it an "excellent album" and stated that "A few other hits will be noticed if you scan the title list. Undoubtedly another winner as Del is in top form".

Nigel Hunter of Disc wrote in his review, stated [Shannon's] "sings out powerfully in front of an excellent studio sound."

Richie Unterberger of AllMusic noted that "Half of the songs on Shannon's second album [...] are on Greatest Hits. These are also the best and most popular songs on Little Town Flirt, which is filled out with competent but unremarkable covers of early '60s hits [...] That means that everyone except Shannon collectors should head to Greatest Hits instead." On the other hand, The Encyclopedia of Popular Music gave the album a four-star rating only, meaning that they believed that album was "A high standard album from the artist, and therefore highly recommended."

== Track listing ==
=== Side one ===
No.	Title	Writer(s)	Length
1.	"Two Kinds of Teardrops"	Del Shannon, Maron McKenzie	2:29
2.	"Dream Baby (How Long Must I Dream)"	Cindy Walker	2:35
3.	"Happiness"	Del Shannon, Jim Ellis	2:20
4.	"Hey! Little Girl"	Del Shannon	2:28
5.	"She Thinks I Still Care"	Dickey Lee, Steve Duffy	2:40
6.	"Runaway"	Max Crook, Shannon	2:19

=== Side two ===
No.	Title	Writer(s)	Length
1.	"Runaround Sue"	Dion DiMucci, Ernie Maresca	2:36
2.	"Hats Off to Larry"	Del Shannon	2:00
3.	"Kelly"	Del Shannon, Marron McKenzie	2:39
4.	"Hey! Baby"	Margaret Cobb, Bruce Channel	2:25
5.	"Go Away Little Girl"	Carole King, Gerry Goffin	2:17
6.	"Little Town Flirt"	Del Shannon, Maron McKenzie	2:40

=== Side one ===
No.	Title	Writer(s)	Length
1.	"Two Kinds of Teardrops"	Maron McKenzie	2:29
2.	"Dream Baby (How Long Must I Dream)"	Cindy Walker	2:35
3.	"Happiness"	Del Shannon, Jim Ellis	2:20
4.	"Two Silhouettes"	Maron McKenzie	2:20
5.	"She Thinks I Still Care"	Dickey Lee, Steve Duffy	2:40
6.	"My Wild One"	Maron McKenzie	2:02

=== Side two ===
No.	Title	Writer(s)	Length
1.	"Runaround Sue"	Dion DiMucci, Ernie Maresca	2:36
2.	"From Me to You"	Lennon–McCartney	1:57
3.	"Kelly"	Marron McKenzie	2:39
4.	"Hey! Baby"	Margaret Cobb, Bruce Channel	2:25
5.	"Go Away Little Girl"	Carole King, Gerry Goffin	2:17
6.	"Little Town Flirt"	Maron McKenzie	2:40

== Charts ==
=== Album ===
Chart (1963)	Peak position
US Top LPs (Billboard)	12
UK Albums Chart	15
US Cashbox	19

=== Singles ===
Year	Title	US Hot 100	UK Singles	US Cashbox
1963	"Two Kinds of Teardrops"	50	5	55
1963	"Little Town Flirt"	12	4	11
