= Hats Off to Del Shannon =

Studio album by Del Shannon
- Released: May 1963
- Genre: Rock and roll
- Length: 28:14
- Label: London

Del Shannon chronology
Runaway with Del Shannon (1961)	Hats Off to Del Shannon (1963)	Little Town Flirt (1963)

Hats Off to Del Shannon is the second studio album by American rock and roll singer-songwriter Del Shannon. It was released in May 1963 in the UK to coincide with Shannon's tour.

== Releases ==
This album was not released in the U.S. or Canada. It contains his last six U.S. A-sides and its six U.S. B-sides. There were no covers of songs recorded specifically for an album release as there were for most of his albums later on. It entered the UK albums chart on May 11, 1963, reaching number nine over the course of 17 weeks.

The album was released on compact disc by Beat Goes On on September 27, 1997, as tracks 13 through 24 on a pairing of two albums on one CD with tracks 1 through 12 consisting of Shannon's 1962 debut album, Runaway with Del Shannon. Bear Family included the album in the 2004 box set Home and Away. Edsel Records included the album in the 2023 Stranger in Town: A Del Shannon Compendium box set.

== Reception ==
Professional ratings
Review scores
Source	Rating
AllMusic	2/5 stars
New Record Mirror	4/5 stars
The Encyclopedia of Popular Music	4/5 stars

New Record Mirror described the album "as entertaining a collection of contemporary pops as you will find", giving it a four-star rating. It received the same rating from The Encyclopedia of Popular Music, meaning that they believed that album was "A high standard album from the artist, and therefore highly recommended while getting a lower two-star rating from AllMusic.

== Track listing ==
All tracks are written by Del Shannon, except where noted.

Side one
No.	Title	Writer(s)	Length
1.	"The Swiss Maid"	Roger Miller	2:07
2.	"Cry Myself to Sleep"		2:22
3.	"Ginny in the Mirror"	Doc Pomus, Mort Shuman	2:11
4.	"You Never Talked About Me"	Doc Pomus, Mort Shuman	2:12
5.	"Don't Gild the Lily, Lily"	Arthur Altman	2:21
6.	"I Won't Be There"		2:02

Side two
No.	Title	Writer(s)	Length
1.	"Hats Off to Larry"		2:02
2.	"The Answer to Everything"	Burt Bacharach, Bob Hilliard	2:46
3.	"Hey! Little Girl"		2:31
4.	"I'm Gonna Move On"		2:49
5.	"I Don't Care Anymore"		2:52
6.	"So Long Baby"		1:59

== Charts ==
Chart (1963)	Peak position
UK Record Retailer Albums Chart	9
