= Larry Uttal =

American music business executive

Lawrence Uttal (December 2, 1921 – November 25, 1993) was an American music business executive who led the Madison Records, Bell and Private Stock record labels in the 1960s and 1970s.

He was born in New York City. He joined Bill Buchanan in the publishing firm Monument Music in 1955, taking sole control the following year and launching Madison Records soon afterwards. In 1961, he closed the Madison label and took over Bell Records, which had previously largely issued children's records, together with its associated labels Mala and Amy. The labels had success in the early 1960s with records by Joey Powers, Ronny & the Daytonas, Del Shannon and Lee Dorsey, before moving into the soul and R&B market in the late 1960s with distribution deals for such leading producers as Papa Don Schroeder, Allen Toussaint, and Thom Bell. He issued records by rock and pop musicians such as The Box Tops, The 5th Dimension, David Cassidy, The Partridge Family and Tony Orlando, and set up several subsidiary labels including Philly Groove.

The Bell, Amy and Mala labels were bought by Columbia-Screen Gems in 1969, but Uttal remained as part-owner and president until leaving in 1974 when Clive Davis merged all the Columbia Pictures Records labels into one and created Arista Records. He then set up the Private Stock label, releasing records by Frankie Valli and the Four Seasons, David Soul, Starbuck and others.

In 1978, Uttal closed Private Stock and moved to London, England, where he worked in the film industry. After returning to New York, he worked in the travel business. He also became active in the Gay Men's Health Crisis organization and the National Gay and Lesbian Caucus.

He died in New York in 1993, aged 71, from AIDS. The musician Jai Uttal is his son and his daughter Jody Uttal (also known as Jody Uttal-Gold) was a cofounder of Rock the Vote and director of corporate videos.
