= Harlem Nocturne =

1939 jazz standard by Earle Hagen & Dick Rogers

Instrumental by Ray Noble Orchestra
- Written: 1939
- Genre: Jazz
- Composer: Earle Hagen
- Lyricist: Dick Rogers

"Harlem Nocturne" is a 1939 jazz standard written by Earle Hagen with lyrics by Dick Rogers for the Ray Noble orchestra, of which they were members. The following year, the song was chosen by big band leader Randy Brooks as his theme song.

The version by the Viscounts has the distinction of being released twice and rising high on the Billboard charts each time: first in 1959, when it peaked at #52, and again in 1966, peaking at #39 on the Billboard Hot 100 chart. Their version also notably appears in the 1983 American horror film, Christine.

"Harlem Nocturne", in a version with Bud Shank on alto saxophone, was the theme song of the television series Mickey Spillane's Mike Hammer and The New Mike Hammer.

Harold Faltermeyer recorded a version for the soundtrack to the film Tango & Cash.

In 1990, the pianist Kofi Wilmot gained popularity in the instrumental world for his cover version from the album of the same name, Harlem Nocturne.

Danny Gatton released a version on his 1993 album Cruisin' Deuces (Elektra/Rhino).

The Sonny Moorman Group released a version on their 2009 Live As Hell album (Atlas Records).

Shadowy Men on a Shadowy Planet recorded a version on their 1987 7" single "Schlagers!" (and included it on their 1988 LP Savvy Show Stoppers) entitled "Harlem by the Sea".

Some singers have recorded "Harlem Nocturne", adding lyrics. Mel Tormé recorded a version with lyrics for his 1963 album Mel Tormé Sings Sunday in New York & Other Songs About New York, beginning with "a nocturne for the blues". Sylvia Brooks recorded a different version, arranged by Jeff Colella, on her album Dangerous Liaisons in 2009, starting with "deep music fills the night", which has since been covered. Other vocal versions are by Ernestine Anderson, Carla White, Denise Jannah, Bonnie Bramlett, and Jacintha. Brian Setzer plays a version loosely based on the theme called "Hollywood Nocturne".

== Renditions ==
"Harlem Nocturne" has been recorded by many diverse artists, including:

- The 5.6.7.8's
- Eric Alexander
- Ernestine Anderson
- Ray Anthony
- Georgie Auld
- Sil Austin
- Charlie Barnet
- Bill Black
- Earl Bostic
- Randy Brooks & His Orchestra with Eddie Caine on alto sax
- AG Weinberger
- Chuck Brown & The Soul Searchers
- Les Brown & His Band of Renown
- Billy Butterfield
- Jim Campilongo & The 10 Gallon Cats
- Ace Cannon
- Chakachas
- Messer Chups (Russia)
- King Curtis
- Martin Denny
- Mink DeVille
- Sam Donahue
- Lou Donaldson
- Steve Douglas
- Terry Edwards & The Scapegoats (paired in a medley with Lydia Lunch's "Cesspool Called History")
- Les Elgart
- Booker Ervin
- Esquivel
- Harold Faltermeyer
- Herbie Fields
- Shep Fields
- Flat Duo Jets
- Henry Franklin with Azar Lawrence
- Danny Gatton
- Ray Gelato & The Chevalier Brothers
- Glen Gray
- Richard Greene & The Greene String Quartet
- Bill Haley and His Comets (performed live)
- Jan Harbeck (Denmark)
- Eddie Harris
- Ted Heath (UK)
- Woody Herman
- Illinois Jacquet
- Willis Jackson
- Harry James
- Quincy Jones
- Dick Jurgens
- Bill Justis
- Stan Kenton
- The Knickerbockers
- Robby Krieger
- Michael Lington (Denmark)
- John Lurie & The Lounge Lizards
- Ken Mackintosh (UK)
- Herbie Mann
- Mantovani
- Big Jay McNeely
- Glenn Miller Orchestra
- Sonny Moorman
- Charlie Musselwhite
- Ray Noble
- Johnny Otis & His Orchestra with Rene Bloch on alto sax and Bill Doggett on piano
- Bill Perkins with Frank Strazzeri
- Louis Prima with Sam Butera & The Witnesses
- Quartet San Francisco
- Boots Randolph
- Eric Reed
- David Rose & His Orchestra with Woody Herman on alto sax
- Oliver Sain
- David Sanborn
- Norman Simmons
- Sonny Stitt
- Mel Taylor & The Magics
- Sam "The Man" Taylor
- Toots Thielemans
- Mel Tormé
- Ulrich Tukur & Die Rhythmus Boys (Germany)
- The Ventures
- The Viscounts
- Jerry Vivino
- Carla White with Lew Tabackin
- Mark Whitfield
- Peter Appleyard
- Edgar Winter
