= Nyah Man Chant =

Studio album by Bushman
- Released: 1997
- Recorded: 1997 at Studio 2000, Kingston, Jamaica
- Genre: Reggae
- Label: Greensleeves/VP
- Producer: Steely & Clevie

Bushman chronology
Nyah Man Chant (1997)	Total Commitment (1999)

VP release cover
- Cover from the VP Records release.

Professional ratings
Review scores
Source	Rating
AllMusic	4.5/5 stars
Reggae Vibes	(favourable)

Nyah Man Chant is the debut album from Jamaican roots reggae singer Bushman. It was released in 1997 by Greensleeves Records in the United Kingdom and by VP Records in the United States. Bushman had hitch-hiked seventy miles to Kingston in the hope of furthering his career. After meeting renowned production team Steely & Clevie in the car park of the Arrows dub-cutting studio, where they were playing football, he auditioned on the spot and was invited to their studio. Prior to the album, Bushman recorded a string of singles for the duo, including "Grow Your Natty", "Call the Hearse", "Remember the Days", "Black Star Liner", and "Man a Lion", all of which were included on the album. The whole album was produced by Steely & Clevie, and employed a real horn section in contrast to many reggae albums of the time, and met with a positive critical reaction. The album recreated the sound of 1970s and 1980s reggae, and included musicians such as Earl "Chinna" Smith, Dean Fraser, and Vin Gordon. The album was described in the Rough Guides book Reggae: 100 Essential CDs as "a coherent, excellently crafted set" and "as good an example of modern roots singing as you could hope to find". AllMusic called the album "a classic".

== Track listing ==
1. "Nyah Man Chant" (Browne, Duncan, Johnson) - 3:28
2. "Remember the Day" (Browne, Myaz, Williams) - 4:48
3. "Cannabis" (Browne, Duncan, Johnson) - 3:56
4. "Man a Lion" (Browne, Duncan, Johnson) - 3:58
5. "Grow Your Natty" (Browne, Duncan, Johnson) - 3:29
6. "She's Gone" (Duncan) - 3:46
7. "Poor People Power" (Browne, Duncan, Johnson) - 3:44
8. "Rude Boy Life" (Browne, Duncan, Johnson) - 3:43
9. "Call the Hearse" (Browne, Duncan, Johnson) - 3:51
10. "My Day" (Browne, Duncan, Johnson) - 3:53
11. "Ain't No Sunshine" (Withers) - 3:17
12. "Anything for Your Love" (Browne, Duncan, Johnson) - 3:31
13. "Black Starliner" (Duncan ) - 3:38
