= The Viscounts (American band) =

American pop music sextet

The Viscounts were an American pop group from New Jersey, formed in 1958. They had one hit single, with Earle Hagen's instrumental classic "Harlem Nocturne" in 1959, which peaked at No. 52 on the U.S. Billboard Hot 100 chart in early 1960; it was re-released in 1965 and hit No. 39 the second time around. The single and album of the same title were originally recorded for the Madison label, then both were reissued in 1965 on the Amy label, with the Amy LP having a slightly different track listing than the Madison release.

== Members ==
- Harry Haller – saxophone
- Bobby Spievak – lead guitar
- Joe Spievak – bass guitar
- Larry Vecchio – electronic organ, piano
- Clark Smith – drums
- William "Billy" Slavis – guitar

== Discography ==
=== Singles ===
Year	Titles (A-side, B-side) Both sides from same album except where indicated	Label & catalogue No.	Chart positions			Album
Year	Titles (A-side, B-side) Both sides from same album except where indicated	Label & catalogue No.	US BB	US CB	US R&B	Album
1959	"Harlem Nocturne" b/w "Dig"	Madison 123	52	28	17	The Viscounts
1960	"The Touch" b/w "Chug-A-Lug"	Madison 129	—	—	—	The Viscounts
1960	"Night Train" b/w "Summertime"	Madison 133	82	52	—	The Viscounts
1960	"Wabash Blues" b/w "So Slow"	Madison 140	77	81	—	Non-album tracks
1961	"Shadrach" b/w "This Place"	Madison 152	—	—	—	Non-album tracks
1961	"Little Brown Jug" b/w "Opus 1" (from Harlem Nocturne)	Madison 159	—	—	—	Non-album tracks
1961	"Sophisticated Lady" b/w "Drag Race"	Madison 165	—	—	—	Harlem Nocturne
1961	"When Johnny Comes Marching Home" b/w "Mark's Mood"	Mr. Peacock 101	—	—	—	Non-album tracks
1962	"Hully Gully" b/w "Continental Walk"	Mr. Peacock 107	—	—	—	Non-album tracks
1962	"Night Fight" b/w "A Girl Like You"	Mr. Peacock 112	—	—	—	Non-album tracks
1963	"Night for Love" b/w "Ballin' The Jack"	Mr. Peeke 125	—	—	—	Non-album tracks
1966	"Harlem Nocturne" b/w "Dig"	Amy 940	39	59	—	Harlem Nocturne
1966	"Night Train" b/w "When The Saints Come Marching In"	Amy 949	122	—	—	Harlem Nocturne
1966	"Off Shore" b/w "Come, Come On Back"	Coral 62490	—	—	—	Non-album tracks
1967	"Sweet Georgia Brown" b/w "Moonlight in Vermont"	Coral 62520	—	—	—	Non-album tracks

=== Albums ===
- The Viscounts (Madison 1001; 1960)
- Harlem Nocturne (Amy 8008; 1965)
