= Runaway with Del Shannon =

Studio album by Del Shannon
- Released: June 1961
- Genre: Rock and roll
- Length: 28:55
- Label: Bigtop
- Producer: Embee Productions

Del Shannon chronology
Runaway with Del Shannon (1961)	Hats Off to Del Shannon (1963)

Singles from Runaway with Del Shannon
- 1. "Runaway" Released: February 1961

Runaway with Del Shannon is the 1961 debut album by American rock and roll singer-songwriter Del Shannon. It contains Shannon's best-known hit, "Runaway". which debuted on the Billboard Hot 100 chart on March 6, 1961, eventually spending four weeks at number one during its 17-weeks stay. on the Cashbox singles weeks it spent three weeks at number one during its 16-weeks stay. and number one in The U.K for three weeks during its 18-weeks stay. It is regarded by critics as having helped bridge the period between early rock and the British Invasion.

Runaway with Del Shannon also features the early recording of "(Marie's the Name) His Latest Flame" (which would later be a huge hit for Elvis Presley later that same year) and a cover of Chuck Jackson "I Wake Up Crying."

The album was released on compact disc by Taragon Records on January 14, 1997, as tracks 1 through 12 on a pairing of two albums on one CD with tracks 13 through 24 consisting of Shannon's 1965 album, 1,661 Seconds with Del Shannon. It was released as one of two albums on one CD by Beat Goes On on September 27, 1997, paired with Shannon's 1963 album, Hats Off to Del Shannon. Bear Family included the album in the 2004 Home and Away box set. Edsel Records included the album in the 2023 Stranger in Town: A Del Shannon Compendium box set.

== Reception ==
Professional ratings
Review scores
Source	Rating
AllMusic	4.5/5 stars
The Encyclopedia of Popular Music	4/5 stars
Disc	1/5 stars

Bruce Eder of AllMusic stated that "Some of the rest is a good deal less appealing, especially when Shannon tries straight romantic crooning, as on "The Search" or "I'll Always Love You." "I Wake up Crying" and especially "Wide Wide World" are successful album tracks, and the latter, at a somewhat quicker tempo."

Billboard in its Spotlight of the Week album reviews stated that the selections "show off his vocal style and his heartfelt approach to a song. Cashbox notes the set includes "strong teen-angled" tunes. Nigel Hunter of Disc described the album as "appalling". On the other hand, The Encyclopedia of Popular Music gave the album a four-star rating only, meaning that they believed that album was "A high standard album from the artist, and therefore highly recommended,

== Track listing ==
All tracks are written by Del Shannon, except where noted.

Side one
No.	Title	Writer(s)	Length
1.	"Misery"	Doc Pomus, Mort Shuman	1:57
2.	"Day Dreams"		2:12
3.	"His Latest Flame"	Pomus, Shuman	2:20
4.	"The Prom"		2:20
5.	"The Search"		2:25
6.	"Runaway"	Max Crook, Shannon	2:20

Side two
No.	Title	Writer(s)	Length
1.	"I Wake Up Crying"	Burt Bacharach, Hal David	2:00
2.	"Wide Wide World"	Pomus, Shuman	2:01
3.	"I'll Always Love You"		2:13
4.	"Lies"		2:35
5.	"He Doesn't Care"		2:09
6.	"Jody"	Crook, Shannon	2:23

== Charts ==
=== Singles ===
Year	Title	US Hot 100	UK Singles	US Cashbox
1961	"Runaway"	1	1	1
