= Stranger in Town =

Stranger in Town may refer to:

== Film and television ==
- Stranger in Town (1931 film), directed by Erle C. Kenton
- A Stranger in Town (1943 film), directed by Roy Rowland
- Stranger in Town (1957 film), British crime film directed by George Pollock
- A Stranger in Town (1967 film), American title of the Tony Anthony spaghetti western Un dollaro tra i denti
- "Stranger in Town" (In the Heat of the Night), episode of the American TV series In the Heat of the Night

== Music ==
- Stranger in Town (album), 1978 album by Bob Seger
- "A Stranger in Town", Mort Greene/Leigh Harline song sung by Burl Ives in the 1948 film Station West
- "Stranger in Town", 1961 song by Mel Tormé on his album My Kind of Music
- ""Stranger in Town" (Del Shannon song), 1965 single by Del Shannon
- "Stranger in Town" (Toto song), a song on the 1984 album Isolation
- "Stranger in Town", song on the 1995 Pat Metheny Group album We Live Here

== See also ==
- Stranger in This Town, 1991 album by Richie Sambora
