= Bell Records =

Record label active 1950s-1970s

- Parent company: Columbia Pictures Industries (1969–1974); Sony Music Entertainment (2008–present)
- Founded: 1952; 74 years ago
- Founder: Arthur Shimkin
- Defunct: 1974
- Status: Defunct
- Genre: Various
- Country of origin: US
- Location: New York City; London (UK branch)

Bell Records was an American record label founded in 1952 in New York City by Arthur Shimkin, the owner of the children's record label Golden Records, and initially a unit of Pocket Books, after the rights to the name were acquired from Benny Bell, who used the Bell name to issue risqué novelty records. A British branch was also active in the 1960s and 1970s. Bell Records was shut down in late 1974, and its assets were transferred to Columbia Pictures' new label, Arista Records.

== 1950s ==
7-inch 78 of "Cara Mia" by Helen Forrest for 39 cents, in a sleeve promoting the Dorsey brothers

At its inception in 1952, Bell specialized in budget generic pop music, with the slogan "music for the millions". Originally sold on seven-inch 78 rpm and 45 rpm records for 39 cents (US), this style of music went out of fashion as rock and roll became more prevalent. Sound-alike cover versions of hit records were also issued on 78 rpm as well as 45 rpm disks priced at 49 cents.

One of these records was by Tom & Jerry, who would later become known using their real surnames, Simon & Garfunkel.

Instead of being pressed into vinyl like a normal 7-inch disc, these records were injection molded by Bestway Products using polystyrene, which either had glued-on labels or the label information was printed directly on the polystyrene, rendering many copies almost unreadable years later. Most (but not all) Bell and associated label 45 rpm records were similarly injection-molded all the way into the 1970s.

As Al Massler, the head of record manufacturer Bestway Products, had become head of Bell Records in 1959, Mala Records was then formed as a Bell subsidiary label, specializing in rock and roll along with rhythm and blues.

== 1960s ==
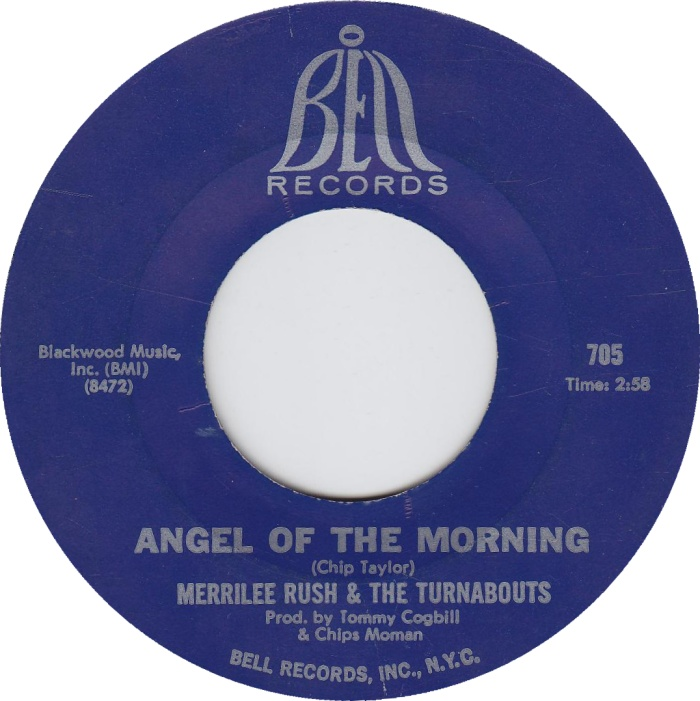
Side label of "Angel of the Morning," with the logo used from 1964 to 1969

In 1960, Amy Records was formed as another subsidiary label, focusing on soul and/or blue-eyed soul acts. The following year, Larry Uttal folded his Madison Records label into Bell after purchasing the label, along with its Amy and Mala subsidiary labels. Concentrating his efforts on the Amy and Mala labels, Uttal rendered the Bell parent label dormant until 1964, when the label was revived, featuring a logo utilizing a stylized "BELL" word mark shaped like a bell.

In 1966, the Bell label was expanded internationally and the company decided to issue all their albums, even for Amy and Mala acts, on the Bell label, and went on to issue several hit singles, including: "Little Girl" by Syndicate of Sound (#5 CB/#8 BB), "I'm Your Puppet" by James and Bobby Purify in 1966, "The Letter" by the Box Tops (the single on Mala, the album on Bell) in 1967, "Angel of the Morning" by Merrilee Rush & the Turnabouts in 1968, and "Gimme Gimme Good Lovin'" by Crazy Elephant in 1969.

In March 1969, Columbia Pictures Industries (CPI) purchased Bell for $3.5 million (mainly in CPI stock), retaining Larry Uttal as label president. Later that year, the Mala, Amy, and Bell labels were merged into a single unit, keeping the Bell moniker. By mid-1971, the assets of the Columbia Pictures-owned but RCA Records-distributed Colgems Records were integrated into the label. Uttal was instrumental in signing many soon-to-be-famous acts such as the Partridge Family, David Cassidy, Ricky Segall, the 5th Dimension, Barry Manilow, Melissa Manchester and Tony Orlando & Dawn, as well as adopting a new "thick-stripe" logo.

== 1970s ==
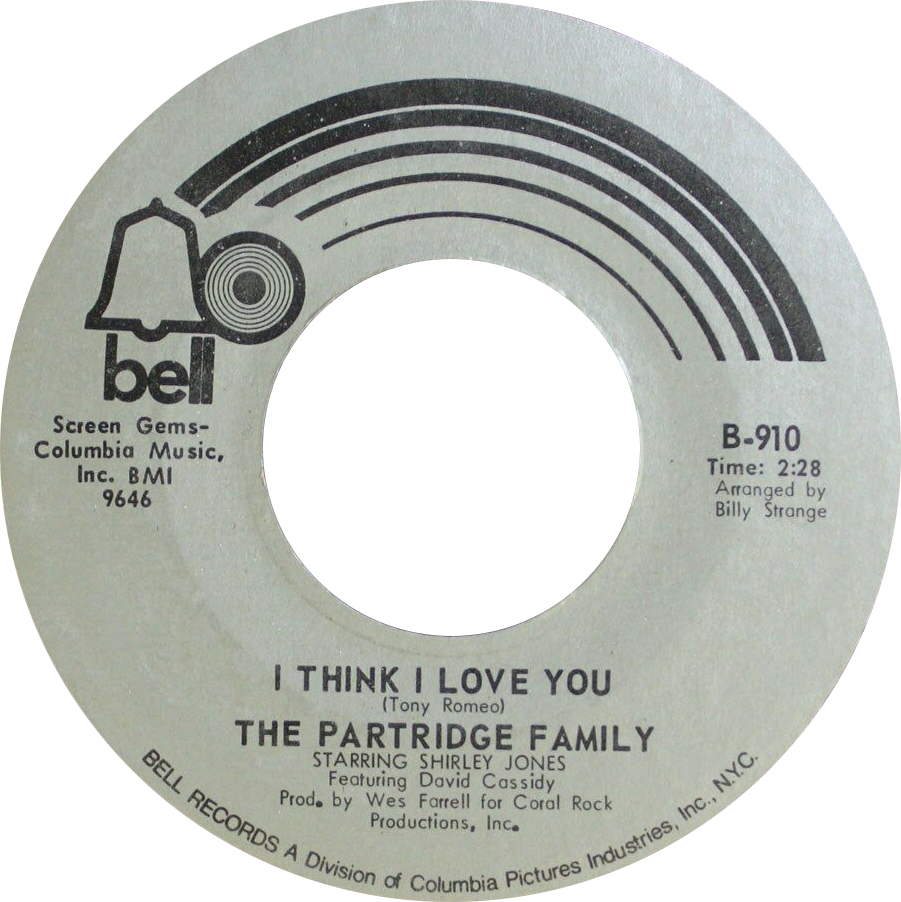
1970s thick-stripe version of the US record label. The UK label had a similar design.

By 1970, the Bell label was more successful with pop music singles, and less successful with more lucrative pop LPs. After a year of declining revenues, Uttal resigned from Bell at the end of May 1974 to begin his own label, Private Stock, financed and distributed outside North America by EMI. Uttal was replaced as president a week later by Clive Davis, who had originally been hired as a record and music consultant by Columbia Pictures. Davis's real goal was to reorganize and revitalize Columbia Pictures's music division. With a $10 million investment by CPI, and a reorganization of the various Columbia Pictures legacy labels (Colpix, Colgems, SGC and Bell), Davis introduced Columbia Pictures' new record division, Arista Records, in November 1974 with Davis himself owning 20% of the new venture.

Bell had its final No. 1 hit in January 1975 with Barry Manilow's "Mandy" (Bell 45,613), followed shortly by the label's final hit, as well as its final single, "Look in My Eyes Pretty Woman" by Tony Orlando and Dawn (Bell 45,620—US #11) after which the more successful Bell albums were reissued on Arista. The last releases utilizing the Bell imprint have the designation "Bell Records, Distributed by Arista Records, 1776 Broadway, New York City 10019" around the rim of the label.

Bell Records also had a division in Japan that was notable for reissuing Colgems original recordings, most notably the Monkees, who enjoyed considerable success in the country well into the 1970s. In 1974, while the US Bell label released Re-Focus (a greatest hits compilation that was subsequently re-released several times on the Arista label as The Monkees Greatest Hits), the Japanese Bell label re-released the entire original Colgems LP catalog along with EPs, box sets and several greatest hits collections (including Re-Focus). While Bell Japan ignored the original Colgems single releases, they did however release the last single recorded by Davy Jones and Micky Dolenz ("Do It in the Name of Love"/"Lady Jane") as "the Monkees" unlike Bell in the US and UK, who opted to use their individual names. In 1973, Bell Japan also utilized the "Gold Disc" subsidiary label to release the 45 single "(Theme from) The Monkees"/"Daydream Believer" (released in the US on the Arista label). The third and final Monkees 45 released in 1973 featured the songs "I Wanna Be Free"/"Take A Giant Step".

== Bell Records UK ==
The British branch was established in 1967. Previous British releases of Bell recordings were issued on EMI's Stateside Records. Bell/Amy/Mala's association with EMI dates back to 1964. Bell Records UK was opened as an independent label on January 1, 1972, in London, headed by Dick Leahy (general manager of the British branch in the previous year), continuing a three-year pressing and distribution agreement with EMI. (In other countries, apart from the United States, Polydor handled distribution, which later picked up British distribution.) Artists signed to it included the Bay City Rollers, Showaddywaddy, the Glitter Band, and American acts Reparata and the Delrons and the Partridge Family with David Cassidy. Other artists on the label included Gary Glitter, Edison Lighthouse (who, along with Glitter, signed with Bell UK thanks to a deal with Laurence Myers's Gem Records,) Barry Blue, Barry Manilow, Terry Jacks, Hello, the Piglets, the Pearls and Harley Quinne, the Drifters, and the UK releases of the Box Tops.

Bell UK initially kept its identity when the American label was reorganized into Arista in 1974, but a year later the UK label adopted the Arista name, although releases continued on the UK Bell label until 1976. Showaddywaddy released the last Bell single, "Under the Moon of Love", which reached No.1 in December 1976, before Arista UK briefly revived the label in 1981. The Bell logo has made occasional appearances on the jackets and labels of Arista UK releases.

== Current ownership ==
The former catalog of Bell Records and its related labels is now owned by Sony Music Entertainment (now a sister company of Columbia Pictures) and managed by Legacy Recordings.

== Subsidiary and associated labels ==
In addition to releasing its own records, Bell Records distributed at least five dozen custom labels throughout its existence. Among the most familiar labels are as follows:

- Big Tree Records
- Philly Groove Records
- Mala Records (Bell-owned)
- Amy Records (Bell-owned)
- Bigtop Records (Brief reactivation under Bell in the mid 60s)
- Carousel Records
- Crewe Records
- Direction Records
- DynoVoice Records
- NewVoice Records
- Page One Records
- Penny Farthing Records
- Pye Records
  The above three labels were U.S. distribution arms of the major U.K. companies
- Rocky Road Records
- TA Records (Talent Associates)
- Windfall Records

Other affiliated labels (in which many released no more than two to 10 singles) included: Academy, Admiral, AGP, Amos, Aquarian, Audio Arts!, Aurora, Bell Country Series, Big Hill, Brookmont, Canusa, Carnation, Chariot, Creative Funk, Cyclone, D.C. Sound, December, DJM, E Records, Elf, Eskee, Gemini Star, General International, Gold Records Incorporated, Goldwax, Hilltop, Hot Line Music Journal, Ivanhoe, JED, Jet Set, Kayman, Kas-Mo, Kingston, Lake, LHI (Lee Hazlewood Industries), Luv, Mona-Lee, Musicland U.S.A., Maxx, New World, Nite Life, Norman, Pacemaker, Pala, Philly Soulville, Philtown, Rain, Roc-Ker, Rotate, Round, Sansu, Show Biz, Simco, Sport, Stere-O-Craft, Sunburst, Taurus, Timmy, Tou-Sea, Twin Stacks, Vando, Village Gate, York, and Zorro.

== Reissue labels ==
Bell also had three oldies reissue labels in its history:

- Flashback Records: Started in 1964 and continued after the Bell/Arista transformation
- Sphere Sound Records (1965–1970): Released reissue singles as well as albums with previously issued and unreleased tracks
- Bell Gold Records (1972): Short-lived label consisting of hits from artists the 5th Dimension and Al Wilson, both of whom were on Soul City which was sold to Bell

== Bell Records artists (1960s) ==
The following artists have had at least one recording released on the Bell Records label or one of its subsidiaries.

(In alphabetical order)

- Cilla Black
- The Box Tops (Mala, Bell)
- Solomon Burke
- Crazy Elephant
- Bette Davis
- The Delfonics (Philly Groove)
- Lee Dorsey (Amy)
- Georgia Gibbs
- Al Green
- Margo Guryan
- O'Jays
- James & Bobby Purify
- Reparata and the Delrons
- Ronny & the Daytonas (Mala)
- Merrilee Rush (Bell, AGP)
- Del Shannon (Amy)
- Smokestack Lightning
- Spooky Tooth (US only)
- Syndicate of Sound
- Jimmy Velvit (as James Bell)

== Bell Records artists (1970s) ==
- April Wine (Big Tree)
- Miki Antony
- Baja Marimba Band
- Bay City Rollers
- Barry Blue
- Brownsville Station (Big Tree)
- Burl Ives
- David Cassidy
- Climax (Carousel, Rocky Road)
- Tony Orlando and Dawn
- The Drifters
- Edison Lighthouse
- The Fantastics
- The 5th Dimension
- First Choice (Philly Groove)
- Micky Dolenz
- David Geddes (Big Tree)
- Gary Glitter
- The Glitter Band
- Godspell (1971 Off-Broadway Cast)
- Godspell movie soundtrack
- Let the Good Times Roll soundtrack
- Gryphon (US and Canada only)
- Hello
- Lost Horizon (1973) movie soundtrack
- Terry Jacks
- Davy Jones
- Shirley Jones
- Vicki Lawrence
- Leapy Lee
- Lobo (Big Tree)
- Melissa Manchester
- Barry Manilow
- Michael McDonald
- Sylvia McNeill
- Peter Noone
- The Partridge Family
- Dan Penn
- Sergio Mendes & Brasil '77
- Suzi Quatro
- Rodney Allen Rippy
- Rick Segall
- Showaddywaddy
- Labi Siffre
- The Monkees (Re-Focus LP in USA, Colgems re-releases and compilations in Japan)
- The Stampeders
- Mary Stuart
- The Sweet
- Marlo Thomas
- Al Wilson (Rocky Road)
- Lenny Zakatek

== See also ==
- Arista Records
- List of record labels
