= Hey! Little Girl =

Single by American musician Del Shannon

Single by Del Shannon

from the album Little Town Flirt
- B-side: "I Don't Care Anymore"
- Released: October 1961
- Recorded: 1961
- Studio: Bigtop Records
- Genre: Rock and roll
- Length: 2:31
- Label: BigTop
- Songwriter: Del Shannon

Del Shannon singles chronology
"So Long Baby" (1961)	"Hey! Little Girl" (1961)	"Ginny In The Mirror" (1962)

Official audio
- "Hey! Little Girl" on YouTube

"Hey! Little Girl" is a song written and performed by American musician Del Shannon.

== Background ==
It was recorded in October 1961 and was released later that year. In the lyrics, the narrator professes his love to a girl that he only barely knows. The girl has recently been dumped by her boyfriend, but the narrator proposes to begin a relationship with her and thus make her feel better. As such, the song is more optimistic than some of Shannon's other songs, such as "Runaway" and "Keep Searchin' (We'll Follow the Sun)". The background music involves both string and brass instruments.

== Chart performance ==
"Hey! Little Girl" reached No. 38 in the US Billboard Hot 100 chart, but was a much bigger hit in the United Kingdom, where it reached No. 2.

Chart (1961–62)	Peak position
Australia (Kent Music Report)	12
Canada (CHUM Chart)	9
UK - Record Retailer	2
US Billboard Hot 100	38
