= Little Town Flirt =

1962 single by Del Shannon

Single by Del Shannon

from the album Little Town Flirt
- B-side: "The Wamboo"
- Released: December 1962
- Genre: Pop rock
- Length: 2:40
- Label: Bigtop
- Songwriters: Del Shannon, Maron McKenzie

Del Shannon singles chronology
"The Swiss Maid" (1962)	"Little Town Flirt" (1962)	"Two Kinds of Teardrops" (1963)

"Little Town Flirt" is a song by Del Shannon, which was released as a single in 1962 from the album Little Town Flirt in 1963.

It spent 14 weeks on the Billboard Hot 100 chart, peaking at No. 12, while reaching No. 1 on the Irish Singles Chart, No. 1 in Australia, No. 4 on the UK's Record Retailer chart, No. 7 on New Zealand's "Lever Hit Parade", and No. 9 on Canada's CHUM Hit Parade.

The song was ranked No. 88 on Billboard's end of year ranking "Top Records of 1963".

== Cover versions ==
"Little Town Flirt"

Single by Smokie
- B-side: "I'm In Love With You"
- Released: 1981
- Length: 3:25
- Label: RAK
- Songwriters: Del Shannon, Maron McKenzie
- Producer: Smokie

Smokie singles chronology
"Run to Me" (1980)	"Little Town Flirt" (1981)	"Jet Lagged" (1982)

The British band Smokie released their version as a single in 1981. The cover spent a total of 17 weeks in the German chart, peaking at No. 30.

In 1979, Electric Light Orchestra began recording their version of the song for their LP “Discovery” but it wasn’t finished until 2000. It was released as a bonus track on the expanded CD reissue of the album.

Altered Images produced a version, first released as a promo single and as a music video in 1982, for the soundtrack album of the 1983 film Party Party. The A&M Records single was backed with "Yakety Yak" by Bad Manners, also from the soundtrack. The Altered Images cover has not re-appeared on any of the band's anthologies.

== Charts ==
=== Del Shannon version ===
Chart (1962–63)	Peak position
Australia – David Kent	1
Canada – CHUM Hit Parade	9
Irish Singles Chart	1
New Zealand – Lever Hit Parade	7
UK – Record Retailer	4
UK – New Musical Express	4
US Billboard Hot 100	12
US Cash Box Top 100	11

=== Smokie version ===
Chart (1981)	Peak position
Germany	30
