= Two Kinds of Teardrops =

Single by Del Shannon

from the album Little Town Flirt
- B-side: "Kelly"
- Released: 1963
- Genre: Rock and roll
- Length: 2:29
- Label: Bigtop
- Songwriters: Del Shannon, Maron McKenzie

Del Shannon singles chronology
"Little Town Flirt" (1962)	"Two Kinds of Teardrops" (1963)	"From Me to You" (1963)

"Two Kinds of Teardrops" is a song by Del Shannon, which he released in 1963 as a single and on the album Little Town Flirt. The song spent 13 weeks on the UK's Record Retailer chart, peaking at No. 5, while spending nine weeks on the Billboard Hot 100 chart, peaking at No. 50, and reaching No. 6 in both Ireland and Hong Kong.

== Chart performance ==
Chart (1963)	Peak position
Hong Kong	6
Ireland - The Irish Times	6
UK - Record Retailer	5
UK - New Musical Express	6
US Billboard Hot 100	50
