= Madison Records =

American record label

Madison Records was an American record label. It was founded in 1958 by Larry Uttal. It lasted until 1961 when Uttal absorbed the label into his newly acquired Bell Records.

== Artists ==
- The Bell Notes
- Dante and the Evergreens
- Nino and the Ebb Tides
- Tico and the Triumphs
- The Viscounts

== See also ==
- Madison Records (Grey Gull) (earlier record label with the same name).
