= Del Shannon Sings Hank Williams =

Studio album by Del Shannon
- Released: February 1965
- Studios: United Sound Systems, Detroit, Michigan
- Genres: Rock and roll, country
- Length: 33:52
- Label: Amy
- Producer: Embee Productions

Del Shannon chronology
| Handy Man (1964) | Del Shannon Sings Hank Williams (1965) | 1,661 Seconds with Del Shannon (1965) |

Del Shannon Sings Hank Williams is the fifth studio album by American rock and roll singer-songwriter Del Shannon. released in February 1965 by Amy Records. It is a tribute album to the songs of Country Music Hall of Fame honky-tonk singer Hank Williams, whom Shannon listed among his influences.

At some point in late 1964, Shannon had decided to record a tribute album to Hank Williams. As Harry Balk recalled, "I didn't really have much faith in the country stuff, but Del really wanted to do it." Les Cooley was the engineer there that we used. Bill Ramal wasn't used to arrange, Del worked up the arrangements himself with The Royaltones."

The album was released on compact disc by Beat Goes On on September 16, 1998, as tracks 1 through 12 on a pairing of two albums on one CD, with tracks 13 through 24 consisting of Shannon's final Amy Records album from April 1965, 1,661 Seconds with Del Shannon. Bear Family included also the album in the 2004 Home and Away box set. Edsel Records included the album in the 2023 Stranger in Town: A Del Shannon Compendium box set.

== Critical reception ==
Professional ratings
Review scores
| Source | Rating |
|---|---|
| AllMusic | 4/5 stars |
| Record Mirror | 3/5 stars |
| The Encyclopedia of Popular Music | 2/5 stars |

Cub Koda of AllMusic gave the album a strong review and said, "While tribute albums nowadays are commonplace, it was usually a tip of the hat to some long-standing show-business icon like Al Jolson. Certainly departed country music stars like Hank Williams were considered outside the pale of such honors."

Billboard selected the album for a "Country Spotlight" review, and stated that "This is a complete change of pace for Del, effectively translating the great tunes made famous by the late Hank Williams."

Cashbox noted that "Shannon's country style stands out on 'Honky Tonk Blues', 'Your Cheatin' Heart', and 'Cold, Cold Heart'".

Record World believed Shannon would "broaden his market considerably with this heartfelt tribute to the late country tunesmith."

Record Mirror called it "Strict Country Fashion" and stated that the "best tracks are the atmospheric 'Kaw-Liga' and the light-hearted 'Hey Good Lookin'". On the other hand, The Encyclopedia of Popular Music gave the album a two-star rating only, meaning that they believed that album was "flawed or lacking in some way."

== Track listing ==
=== Side one ===
All tracks are written by Hank Williams, except where noted.

| No. | Title | Writer(s) | Length |
|---|---|---|---|
| 1. | "Your Cheatin' Heart" | | 3:06 |
| 2. | "Kaw-Liga" | Williams, Fred Rose | 3:08 |
| 3. | "I Can't Help it" | | 2:34 |
| 4. | "Honky Tonk Blues" | | 2:20 |
| 5. | "(I Heard That) Lonesome Whistle" | Jimmie Davis | 2:19 |
| 6. | "You Win Again" | | 3:11 |

=== Side two ===
| No. | Title | Length |
|---|---|---|
| 1. | "Ramblin' Man" | 3:22 |
| 2. | "Hey, Good Lookin'" | 2:35 |
| 3. | "Long Gone Lonesome Blues" | 2:13 |
| 4. | "Weary Blues" | 3:17 |
| 5. | "I'm So Lonesome I Could Cry" | 2:58 |
| 6. | "Cold, Cold Heart" | 2:49 |
