= Bushman (reggae singer) =

Jamaican reggae singer

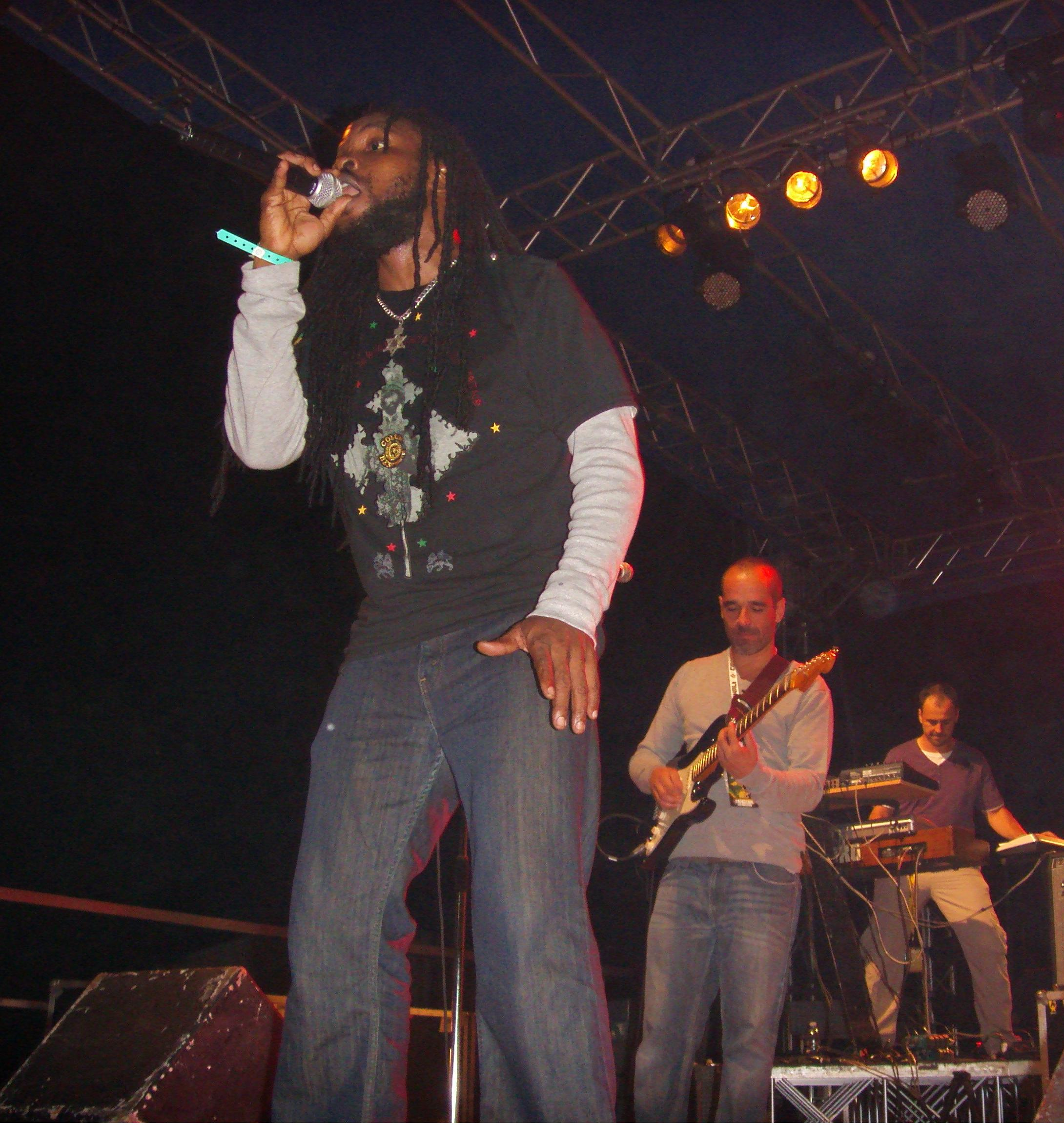
- Bushman in 2010

Background information
- Born: Dwight Marvin Duncan; 1973 (age 52–53)
- Origin: Prospect Beach, Saint Thomas Parish, Jamaica
- Genres: Reggae
- Instrument: vocals
- Labels: Greensleeves, VP
- Website: https://www.instagram.com/original_bushman/

Bushman (born Dwight Marvin Duncan, 1973) is a Jamaican reggae singer. He was raised in the Rastafari culture from a young age.

== Biography ==
Born Dwight Duncan in Prospect Beach, St. Thomas, Jamaica in 1973, he was raised as a Rastafarian. He attended the Lysson All Age School, where his music teacher noticed his potential for music and nurtured him in his developing stages. Dwight then went on to Yallahs High School where he continued to shine musically as a member of the school choir, a member of the Yallahs drum core, playing the bass organ, also participating in numerous school concerts. He was also a member of the New Testament Church of God Choir, where he earned the name Ark Angel.

As a teenager he worked as a selector under the name Junior Melody (sometimes Junior Buckley) for the Black Star Line sound-system, and took part in several singing competitions and talent searches in and around St. Thomas. Gaining a strong local fan base Junior Melody began to sing dub plates for local sound-systems such as Lee's Unlimited, Mello Construction, King Majesty and others. The rave reviews from the sound selectors and the people of his community encouraged Junior Melody to take his talent to the next level, the studios of Kingston.

He hitch-hiked to Kingston, and during an impromptu game of football at Arrows Dub plate studio he met Steely & Clevie. After telling them that he was a singer, they invited him to Studio 2000, where he recorded his first tracks. Their first song together was "Grow Your Natty", which was followed by the hit "Call The Hearse". With talks of an album Steely wished to change the name Junior Melody to Bushman. Initially Duncan was unhappy with this name, he thought it somehow derogatory to him coming from the country, until he researched the name only to discover that 'Bushman' was an African name for 'Medicine Man'. "Call The Hearse" became a big hit in Jamaica, and was followed by "Rude Boy Life" and his debut album, Nyah Man Chant (1997). Nyah Man Chant was described in The Rough Guide to Reggae as "as good an example of modern cultural singing as you could hope to find."

Bushman then moved on to work with King Jammy, who produced his next two albums - Total Commitment, which collected most of the early singles he recorded for the producer, and Higher Ground. A Better Place was the fourth album from Bushman. For this album Bushman teamed up with the UK-based Stingray team.

Despite the recognition of his talent, Bushman still lives in St. Thomas with his wife and children, follows a strict ital diet, and bathes in the hot water springs of St. Thomas.

Conquering Lion, featuring a guest appearance from Capleton, was released on 19 October 2012.

== Discography ==
- Nyah Man Chant (1997), Greensleeves/VP
- Total Commitment (2000), Greensleeves
- A Better Place (2001), Artists Only - reissued as My Meditation (2003), Charm
- Higher Ground (2001), Greensleeves
- Toe 2 Toe Vol. 4 (2002), Charm - with Luciano
- Signs (2004), VP
- Get It in Your Mind (2008), Burning Bushes
- Bushman Sings the Bush Doctor (2011), VP
- Conquering Lion (2018), Burning Bushes Music
- Your Life (2021), Futureline Records

Compilations

- Most Wanted (2009), Greensleeves
