= From Me to You =

1963 single by the Beatles

- US picture sleeve

Single by the Beatles
- A-side: "From Me to You" (UK release and US 1st release) "Please Please Me" (US 2nd release)
- B-side: "Thank You Girl" (UK & US 1st release)
- Released: 11 April 1963 (UK); 27 May 1963 (US); 3 January 1964 (US "Please Please Me" single)
- Recorded: 5 March 1963
- Studio: EMI, London
- Genre: Merseybeat
- Length: 1:56
- Label: Parlophone (UK); Vee-Jay, Capitol Records (US)
- Songwriter: Lennon–McCartney
- Producer: George Martin

The Beatles singles chronology
"Please Please Me" (1963)	"From Me to You" (1963)	"She Loves You" (1963)

"From Me to You" is a song by the English rock band the Beatles that was released in April 1963 as their third single. It was written by John Lennon and Paul McCartney. The song was the Beatles' first number 1 hit on what became the official UK singles chart but the second, after "Please Please Me", on most of the other singles charts published in the UK at the time. "From Me to You" failed to make an impact in the United States at the time of its initial release. Instead, a 1963 cover version released by Del Shannon resulted in the song's becoming the first Lennon–McCartney track to enter the US pop charts. The Beatles' original was re-released in the US in January 1964 as the B-side to "Please Please Me", and reached number 41.

== Composition ==
Lennon and McCartney began writing "From Me to You" while on a coach heading to Shrewsbury as part of the Beatles' tour with Helen Shapiro. The title was inspired by the name of the letters section of the New Musical Express, which they had been reading: "From You to Us". McCartney noted that their early songs tended to include the words "I", "me" or "you" in them, as a way of making them "very direct and personal" to the band's fans.

In his 1980 interview with Playboy, Lennon recalled writing the song:

We were writing it in a car I think, and I think the first line was mine. I mean I know it was mine. [Hums melody of first line.] And then after that we took it from there. It was far bluesier than that when we wrote it. The notes—today you could rearrange it pretty funky.

Before that interview, Lennon had stated, "We nearly didn't record it because we thought it was too bluesy at first, but when we'd finished it and George Martin had scored it with harmonica, it was alright."

McCartney also talked about rearranging the song in 1964:

"From Me to You"—it could be done as an old ragtime tune—especially the middle eight—and so we're not writing the tunes in any particular idiom. In five years' time we may arrange the tunes differently. But we'll probably write the same old rubbish!

Singer-songwriter Roger Greenaway recounted a story:

John and Paul were sitting at the back of the coach and Kenny Lynch, who at this time fancied himself as a songwriter, sauntered up to the back of the coach and Kenny Lynch ... decided he would help them write a song. After a period of about half-an-hour had elapsed and nothing seemed to be coming from the back, Kenny rushed to the front and shouted, 'Well, that's it. I am not going to write any more of that bloody rubbish with those idiots. They don't know music from their backsides. That's it! No more help from me!'

Regardless, the song was regarded by the Beatles as innovative and catchy enough to be released as a single. This was one Lennon–McCartney song that the duo truly co-wrote; McCartney described it as "very much co-written".

== Melody and lyrics ==
"From Me to You" sample

"From Me to You" comprises five verses and two bridges. The form is Intro V V B V V B V Coda. The first half of the fourth verse is instrumental. The last half of each verse is a mini-refrain, while the lyrics of the bridges are identical. The verses each consist of a rather short eight measures played in C major. In the bridge, the song modulates to the subdominant (IV) key: F major. The tonic-subdominant modulation is almost a cliché, but Lennon & McCartney avoid the cliché by going another route from I to IV than the standard I–I^{7}–IV. At the bridge's climax, the chord changes are accompanied by "woo!" Another characterising element in the bridge is the augmented chord – a Gaug – that ends the bridge and leads back to home key (C major). Lennon plays prominent harmonica solos during the beginning, middle and end of the song, as he did with "Love Me Do".

McCartney said of the song:

The thing I liked about "From Me to You" was it had a very complete middle. It went to a surprising place. The opening chord of the middle section of that song heralded a new batch for me. That was a pivotal song. Our songwriting lifted a little with that song.

The idea of singing the song's opening lick—the "da da da da da dum dum da" part—was suggested by George Martin, the Beatles' producer. The group thought it unusual but put their trust in Martin. "In a way, this made [the Beatles] aware of George's enormous musical sense," EMI producer Ron Richards later said.

In the song, the singer offers his love to the object of his affections—he has "everything that you want". Although the song is based on singular first-person pronouns, it lacks a lead singer.

== Recording and UK release ==
George Martin said of the song, "I asked them for another song as good as 'Please Please Me', and they brought me one—'From Me to You.' ... There seemed to be a bottomless well of songs."

The recording on 5 March 1963 at EMI Studios took 6 takes with 7 edit pieces and went without a hitch and on 11 April Parlophone released "From Me to You" in the UK as a single, with "Thank You Girl" on the B-side, catalogue number R5015. Nine days later, it kicked off a twenty-one week run in the British charts, reaching number one on 4 May, a position it would retain for seven weeks.

"From Me to You" featured Lennon playing harmonica in a Jimmy Reed-inspired blues style he had learned from Delbert McClinton, another American who was on the same bill with the Beatles in the early Sixties. "It's chiseled in stone now that I taught Lennon how to play harmonica," McClinton said. "John said, 'Show me something.' I was in a pretty unique position, because there just weren't a lot of people playing harmonica in popular music."

"From Me to You" was the first Beatles song to reach number one in the UK and is widely considered to be their first chart-topping song, for although "Please Please Me" reached the summit on almost every chart, it was only number two on Record Retailer's chart, generally considered to be the most authoritative for the time. "From Me to You" would be the first of eleven consecutive British number one singles by the Beatles.

"From Me to You" replaced Gerry and the Pacemakers' "How Do You Do It", a song that had been offered to the Beatles (and even recorded by them, though it remained officially unreleased until 1995) but ultimately rejected by them in favour of "Please Please Me". Gerry & The Pacemakers, who also hailed from Liverpool, were very much rivals of the Beatles in their early days—Gerry and the Pacemakers attained the first number one ("How Do You Do It") before the Beatles, and also claimed their second and third number ones before the Beatles did, slowly losing steam afterwards as Beatlemania launched and the Beatles dominated music worldwide in 1964.

A true indication of how successful the Beatles became thanks to "From Me to You" (though it would soon be overshadowed by "She Loves You" and "I Want to Hold Your Hand") was expressed by McCartney: "The first time I thought we'd really made it, was when I was lying in bed one morning, and I heard a milkman whistling 'From Me to You'. Actually, I'm sure that I once heard a bird whistling it as well. I swear I did!"

== First US release ==
When it released "Please Please Me" in the United States, Vee-Jay Records signed a licensing agreement giving it the right of first refusal on Beatles records for five years. Despite the failure of "Please Please Me" to catch on, Vee-Jay chose to release "From Me to You"; as a result, it was never turned down by Capitol, because it was never offered to them. "From Me to You" was released on Vee-Jay 522, with "Thank You Girl" on the B-side, on 27 May 1963. Even though Cash Box magazine called it a "Pick of the Week" when it was released, it initially failed even more miserably than its predecessor; through the end of June, "From Me to You" sold fewer than 4,000 copies and had failed to chart anywhere.

When Del Shannon released a cover version of "From Me to You" on Bigtop Records in June, Vee-Jay tried to stimulate more interest in the original, both by placing magazine ads and by sending out additional promotional copies of the 45 stamped with the words "The Original Hit". But the biggest boost to the Beatles' version came from Dick Biondi, who had played "Please Please Me" on WLS in Chicago. Biondi was fired by WLS in May and relocated to KRLA 1110 in Los Angeles in June. He was able to convince his new employer to add "From Me to You" to its playlist, and it entered KRLA's "Tune-Dex" on 14 July, spending six weeks on the chart and peaking at 32 on 11 August.

Because of the airplay, and resulting sales, in Los Angeles, "From Me to You" made the Billboard Bubbling Under the Hot 100 chart for three weeks, peaking at number 116 on 10 August, the same time the single peaked in Los Angeles. It was the first time the Beatles appeared on a national chart in Billboard. The late attention in Los Angeles spurred sales of the 45; in the end, the original edition of "From Me to You" sold approximately 22,000 copies, roughly three times as many as "Please Please Me" had.

== Second US release ==
Vee-Jay chose to couple "From Me to You" with "Please Please Me" when it re-released the single on 3 January 1964, shortly after film of the Beatles had appeared on The Jack Paar Program, the NBC television prime-time version of Paar's previous Tonight Show. Had Vee-Jay known how all-encompassing Beatlemania would become, it likely would have saved "From Me to You" for use as an A-side, the way it did with "Twist and Shout" and "Do You Want to Know a Secret". But even as a B-side, "From Me to You" entered the Billboard chart on 7 March and peaked at number 41 and number 6 in Canada. The double-sided hit sold approximately 1.1 million copies in 1964.

== Help! ==
An instrumental arrangement, "From Me to You Fantasy" is used in the film, Help!, arranged by Ken Thorne, and is track 3 of the original U.S. release of the soundtrack album. It appears during scenes of attempts to remove the ring from Ringo's finger while he sleeps in the Beatles' communal apartment.

== Album availability ==
"From Me to You" made its first album appearance (overall) on the Canadian Twist and Shout LP in 1964. That same year, it made its US album debut on Vee-Jay's Jolly What! England's Greatest Recording Stars: The Beatles and Frank Ifield on Stage; its first appearance on a "regular" US Beatles album wouldn't come until 1973 when it appeared on the double LP compilation 1962–1966. In 1966, "From Me to You" was first issued in the UK on A Collection of Beatles Oldies, followed by the 1962–1966 compilation seven years later. The first release on CD was in 1988 when it was included in the Past Masters compilation. It was later released on the 1962–1966 double CD and the single CD compilation 1.

== Alternative mixes ==
The mono version, which was issued as a single in 1963, has appeared on the 1988 issue of Past Masters, the 1962–1966 CD reissues, the 1 compilation released in 2000, and Mono Masters in 2009. The stereo version was included on the 1966 compilation A Collection of Beatles Oldies, the original LP issues of 1962–1966 in 1973, and the 2009 reissue of Past Masters. The intro to the stereo version (recorded on two tracks) lacks the harmonica inserted into the mono mix.

== Chart history ==
=== Weekly charts ===
Chart (1963–64)	Peak position
Australian Kent Music Report	9
Canada (CHUM Chart)	6
Denmark (Salgshitlisterne Top 20)	18
Ireland (IRMA)	1
Italy (Musica e Dischi)	8
New Zealand (Lever Hit Parade)	1
Norway (VG-lista)	9
South Africa (Springbok)	1
Sweden (Kvällstoppen)	5
Sweden (Tio i Topp)	5
UK Singles (Official Charts)	1
US Billboard Hot 100	41

=== Year-end charts ===
Chart (1963)	Rank
South Africa	1
UK	2

== Personnel ==
- John Lennon – lead vocal, rhythm guitar, harmonica
- Paul McCartney – backing vocal, bass guitar
- George Harrison – lead guitar
- Ringo Starr – drums

Personnel per Ian MacDonald

== Del Shannon cover ==
"From Me to You"

Single by Del Shannon
- B-side: "Two Silhouettes"
- Released: June 1963
- Genre: Rock and roll
- Length: 2:00
- Label: Bigtop
- Songwriter: McCartney–Lennon

Del Shannon singles chronology
"Two Kinds of Teardrops" (1963)	"From Me to You" (1963)	"Sue's Gotta Be Mine" (1963)

On 18 April 1963, the Beatles were one of 15 acts to play at Swinging Sound '63, an all-star concert at the Royal Albert Hall in London. They played "From Me to You" and "Twist and Shout". Del Shannon was also on the bill that night. After the concert, he told John Lennon that he was going to record "From Me to You" because he liked the falsetto parts in the song. At first, Lennon was flattered, but he quickly changed his mind, realizing that a cover version by Shannon might hurt the Beatles' chances of having a hit in the States. As it turned out, Lennon was temporarily right, but neither artist's version was a big hit in America.

In early June, Bigtop Records released Shannon's version of "From Me to You" as the follow-up to "Two Kinds of Teardrops." It entered the Billboard Hot 100 on 29 June, becoming the first Lennon–McCartney composition to make the American charts. It spent four weeks on the chart and peaked at number 77. It was even more successful in Chicago as it peaked at number 15 on the WLS "Silver Dollar Survey".

Shannon's recording follows the Beatles' original almost verbatim, except for a slightly faster tempo and fade-out. "At that time no one had heard of the Beatles here (the US), but I knew they were great writers so I just picked up on one of their songs," Shannon said later.

=== Chart history ===
Chart (1963)	Peak position
Australia	21
Canada (CHUM Hit Parade)	13
US Billboard Hot 100	77
US Cash Box Top 100	67

== Later versions ==
Bobby McFerrin covered the song in his 1986 album, Spontaneous Inventions.

In November 2008, a slowed-down cover version using only piano and vocals became the first Beatles song to be used in a British advertising campaign when it was used in John Lewis' Christmas marketing.

On 4 March 2016, a remixed version of the song was released by Yolanda Be Cool & DCUP.

American indie rock band Futurebirds included the song on its 2016 EP "Portico I".
