= The Dublin Sessions =

Studio album by Del Shannon
- Released: July 7, 2017
- Studio: Ireland's Dublin Sound Studios Dublin, Ireland
- Genre: Rock; pop
- Length: 37:55
- Label: RockBeat

Del Shannon chronology
Home and Away (2006)	The Dublin Sessions (2017)

The Dublin Sessions is a posthumous album by American musician Del Shannon which was released on July 7, 2017. This previously unreleased album was recorded by him in 1977 with his UK-based touring band called Smackee at Ireland's Dublin Sound Studios and was long believed lost.

Edsel Records included this CD in a box set entitled Stranger in Town: A Del Shannon Compendium, which contains 14th of his studio albums and three compilation and was released on February 24, 2023.

== Background ==
Shannon shopped around this 1977 material with no success. By the time he got out of rehab and started working with Tom Petty and the Heartbreakers on what would become the Petty-produced Drop Down and Get Me, the Dublin material “just sort of fell into the rear-view mirror.” Shannon originally mixed and then remixed the tracks at Cherokee Studios in California but opted to never release them.

== Critical reception ==
Cleveland.com wrote: "Sometimes, when a record label unearths material from the vaults, one listen tells you why it stayed unreleased for so long. Other times, the tracks are good enough to make you wonder how they could have remained in the can until now.

== Track listing ==
=== Side one ===
All tracks are written by Del Shannon, except where noted.

No.	Title	Writer(s)	Length
1.	"Best Days of My Life"		3:28
2.	"Love Letters"	Edward Heyman, Victor Young	3:00
3.	"Till I Found You"		2:25
4.	"Raylene"		4:14
5.	"One Track Mind"		3:22
6.	"Black Is Black"	Michelle Grainger, Tony Hayes, Steve Wadey	3:07

=== Side two ===
No.	Title	Writer(s)	Length
1.	"Oh, Pretty Woman"	Roy Orbison, Bill Dees	3:31
2.	"Another Lonely Night"		4:06
3.	"Amanda"	Stuart Cowell, Del Shannon	3:57
4.	"Love Don't Come Easy"	Max Crook, Del Shannon	3:24
5.	"Today I Started Loving You Again"	Merle Haggard, Bonnie Owens	2:21
