= Home and Away (album) =

Studio album by Del Shannon
- Released: 30 October 2006
- Recorded: 23–26 February 1967
- Studio: Olympic, London
- Genre: Baroque pop
- Label: Immediate (1967, unreleased); EMI (2006)
- Producer: Andrew Loog Oldham

Del Shannon chronology
Rock On! (1991)	Home and Away (2006)	The Dublin Sessions (2017)

Professional ratings
Review scores
Source	Rating
AllMusic	4/5 stars

Home and Away is an album by Del Shannon. It was recorded in England in 1967, but the singles did not achieve chart success and the album was not released. It was released (with a few other later songs added) in a remixed version 1978 under the title And The Music Plays On, then released under its original name, with the original intended cover, and original track list (except for added bonus tracks) in 2006.

Bear Family included also the album in the 2004 Home and Away box set. Edsel Records included the album in the 2023 Stranger in Town: A Del Shannon Compendium box set.

== Reception ==
Jason Ankeny of AllMusic's gave the album a positive reviews, saying "Shannon's otherworldly vocals achieve a new maturity and poignancy here, substituting their traditional romantic longing with the desperation of an artist struggling to remain relevant and vibrant in a brave new world."

== Track listing ==
1. "It's My Feeling" (Andrew Rose, David Skinner)
2. "Mind Over Matter" (Jeremy Paul Solomons)
3. "Silently" (Dan Bourgoise, Del Shannon)
4. "Cut and Come Again" (Billy Nicholls)
5. "My Love Has Gone" (Ross Watson)
6. "Led Along" (Billy Nicholls)
7. "Life Is But Nothing" (Andrew Rose, David Skinner)
8. "Easy to Say" (Andrew Rose, David Skinner)
9. "Friendly with You" (Billy Nicholls)
10. "He Cheated" (Del Shannon)
11. "Runaway '67" (Del Shannon, Max Crook). With John Paul Jones, Nicky Hopkins and Jimmy Page as session musicians.

CD bonus tracks

1. "Led Along" [Mono, US & UK Single] (Billy Nicholls)
2. "Mind Over Matter" [Mono, UK Single] (Jeremy Paul Solomons)
3. "Runaway '67" [Mono, US & UK Single] (Del Shannon, Max Crook)
4. "He Cheated" [Mono, US Single] (Del Shannon)
5. "Silently" [Mono, Philippines Single] (Dan Bourgoise, Del Shannon)
