= 1,661 Seconds with Del Shannon =

Studio album by Del Shannon
- Released: April 1965
- Genre: Rock and roll
- Length: 27:41
- Label: Amy
- Producer: Embee Productions

Del Shannon chronology
Del Shannon Sings Hank Williams (1965)	1,661 Seconds with Del Shannon (1965)	This Is My Bag (1966)

Singles from 1,661 Seconds with Del Shannon
- 1. "Do You Wanna Dance" Released: September 19, 1964; 2. "Keep Searchin' (We'll Follow the Sun)" Released: November 1964; 3. "Stranger in Town" Released: February 27, 1965

1,661 Seconds with Del Shannon is the sixth studio album by American rock and roll singer-songwriter Del Shannon, released in April 1965 by Amy Records. His final album for the label, it features the singles "Do You Wanna Dance", "Keep Searchin' (We'll Follow the Sun)", and "Stranger in Town". It features a mix of originals and covers of songs by Gene Pitney and Roy Orbison.

Three singles released from the album, "Do You Want to Dance" made its debut on the Billboard Hot 100 chart on September 19, 1964, eventually spending one week at number forty-three during its 7-week stay, and number forty-five on the Cash Box singles chart, "Keep Searchin' (We'll Follow the Sun)" made its debut on the Billboard Hot 100 chart on November 21, 1964, eventually spending one week at number nine during its 14-week stay, number eight on the Cash Box singles chart, and number 3 in the UK Singles. "Stranger in Town" made its debut on the Billboard Hot 100 chart on February 27, 1965, eventually spending one week at number thirty-five during its 9-week stay, number thirty-three on the Cash Box singles chart and number 40 in the UK Singles.

The album was released on compact disc by Taragon Records on January 14, 1997, as tracks 13 through 24 on a pairing of two albums on one CD with tracks 1 through 12 consisting of Shannon's 1961 debut studio album Runaway with Del Shannon. It was released as one of two albums on one CD by Beat Goes On on September 16, 1998, paired with Shannon's 1965 album, Del Shannon Sings Hank Williams.

Bear Family included the album in the 2004 Home and Away box set. Edsel Records included the album in the 2023 Stranger in Town: A Del Shannon Compendium box set.

== Critical reception ==
Professional ratings
Review scores
Source	Rating
AllMusic	3/5 stars
New Record Mirror	3/5 stars
The Encyclopedia of Popular Music	4/5 stars

Bruce Eder of AllMusic said, "Del Shannon's fifth LP, and his third for the Amy Records label, is an amazingly good effort that holds up very well. The music shows the influence of the British bands of the period without compromising Shannon's own sound -- his originals, mostly hook-laden, achingly beautiful, and bracing."

Billboard called the album "all commercially powerful" and proves that "a good sized pop hit for Shannon - will guarantee interest in the LP".

Record World said "Del does a dozen delightful vesions of pop tunes that have had their moment recently or in the past of a few years back."

Record Mirror called it "a worthwhile LP". On the other hand, The Encyclopedia of Popular Music gave the album a four-star rating only, meaning that they believed that album was "A high standard album from the artist, and therefore highly recommended."

== Track listing ==
=== Side one ===
All tracks are written by Del Shannon, except where noted.

No.	Title	Writer(s)	Length
1.	"Stranger in Town"		2:28
2.	"She Cried"	Ted Daryll, Greg Richards	2:29
3.	"Needles and Pins"	Jack Nitzsche, Sonny Bono	2:04
4.	"Broken Promises"		2:14
5.	"Why Don't You Tell Him"		2:07
6.	"Do You Wanna Dance"	Bobby Freeman	2:09

=== Side two ===
No.	Title	Writer(s)	Length
1.	"I Go to Pieces"		2:25
2.	"I'm Gonna Be Strong"	Barry Mann, Cynthia Weil	2:00
3.	"Rag Doll"	Bob Crewe, Bob Gaudio	2:46
4.	"Over You"		2:34
5.	"Running Scared"	Roy Orbison, Joe Melson	2:15
6.	"Keep Searchin' (We'll Follow the Sun)"		2:10

== Charts ==
=== Singles ===
Year	Title	US Hot 100	UK Singles	US Cash Box
1964	"Do You Wanna Dance"	43	—	45
1964	"Keep Searchin' (We'll Follow the Sun)"	9	3	15
1965	"Stranger in Town"	30	40	33
