= Handy Man (Del Shannon album) =

Studio album by Del Shannon
- Released: October 1964
- Genre: Rock and roll
- Length: 28:41
- Label: Amy
- Producer: Embee Productions

Del Shannon chronology
| Little Town Flirt (1963) | Handy Man (1964) | Del Shannon Sings Hank Williams (1965) |

Singles from Handy Man
- 1. "Mary Jane" Released: February 1964; 2. "Handy Man" Released: June 1964

Handy Man is the fourth studio album by American rock and roll singer-songwriter Del Shannon. It features the singles "That's the Way Love Is", "Mary Jane", and "Handy Man",

In the US, the single released from the album, "Handy Man", debuted on the Billboard Hot 100 chart on March 6, 1961, peaking at number 22 during its ten-weeks stay. on the Cashbox singles weeks, The song peaked at number 19 during its 11-weeks stay. and number 36 in The U.K during its four-weeks stay. Another single, 'That's the Way Love Is", spent a week on the Billboard Bubbling Under Hot 100 Singles chart in the issue dated March 14, 1964, peaking at number 133. In the UK the song chosen as the single for release was "Mary Jane", and it entered the singles chart there for the week of March 18, 1964, stayed around for five weeks, peaking at number 35.

it also features His wide range of several contemporary hits with covers of "Ruby Baby", "A World Without Love", "Sorry (I Ran All the Way Home)", "Crying" and two Berlee Singles. The album debuted on the Cashbox albums chart in the issue dated October 17, 1964, and remained on the chart for six weeks, peaking at number 79.

The album was released on compact disc by Beat Goes On on August 25, 1998 as tracks 13 through 24 on a pairing of two albums on one CD with tracks 1 through 12 consisting of Shannon's Final Bigtop album from June 1963, Little Town Flirt

Bear Family included also the album in the 2004 Home and Away box set. Edsel Records included the album in the 2023 Stranger in Town: A Del Shannon Compendium box set.

== Reception ==
Professional ratings
Review scores
| Source | Rating |
|---|---|
| Record Mirror | 3/5 stars |
| The Encyclopedia of Popular Music | 4/5 stars |

Billboard selected the album for a "Pop Special Merit" review, and stated that it does contain "Handy Man and 11 other in special rockin' style."

Cashbox praised Shannon for his "rich, wide-range baritone and distinctive, lyrical delivery carries him in good stead on “That’s The Way Love Is,” “I’ll Be Lonely Tomorrow” and “World Without Love"

Record World believed "Most of the tunes call for emotion and get it. A lot of vocal pyrotechnics as well.'"

Record Mirror described the album as a "excellently recorded, performed, and a great dance beat album." On the other hand, The Encyclopedia of Popular Music gave the album a four-star rating only, meaning that they believed that album was "A high standard album from the artist, and therefore highly recommended."

== Track listing ==
Side one
| No. | Title | Writer(s) | Length |
|---|---|---|---|
| 1. | "Memphis" | Chuck Berry | 2:30 |
| 2. | "That's the Way Love Is" | Del Shannon | 2:25 |
| 3. | "Ruby Baby" | Jerry Leiber, Mike Stoller | 2:16 |
| 4. | "I'll Be Lonely Tomorrow" | Maron MacKenzie | 2:11 |
| 5. | "I Can't Fool Around Anymore" | George Katsakis | 2:22 |
| 6. | "Handy Man" | Otis Blackwell, Jimmy Jones | 2:14 |

Side two
| No. | Title | Writer(s) | Length |
|---|---|---|---|
| 1. | "Crying" | Joe Melson | 2:37 |
| 2. | "Mary Jane" | Maron MacKenzie | 2:28 |
| 3. | "World Without Love" | John Lennon, Paul McCartney | 2:42 |
| 4. | "Sorry (I Ran All the Way Home)" | Artie Zwirn, Harry Giosasi | 1:47 |
| 5. | "Give Her Lots of Lovin'" | Del Shannon | 2:03 |
| 6. | "Twist and Shout" | Bert Russell, Phill Medley | 2:37 |

== Charts ==
| Chart (1964) | Peak position |
|---|---|
| US Cash Box | 79 |

Singles

| Year | Single | Chart | Peak |
|---|---|---|---|
| 1964 | "That's the Way Love Is"" | US Billboard Hot 100 | 133 |
| 1964 | "That's the Way Love Is"" | US Cash Box | 122 |
| 1964 | "Mary Jane" | UK Singles Chart | 35 |
| 1964 | "Mary Jane" | US Cash Box | 124 |
| 1964 | "Handy Man" | US Billboard Hot 100 | 22 |
| 1964 | "Handy Man" | US Cash Box | 19 |
| 1964 | "Handy Man" | UK Singles Chart | 36 |
