= Sonny Moorman =

American power blues guitarist

- Born: Cyril Moorman; Ohio, United States
- Genres: Blues
- Occupation: Musician
- Instruments: Electric guitar, acoustic guitar, vocals
- Years active: 1975–present
- Website: http://www.sonnymoorman.net/

Cyril "Sonny" Moorman (born 1955) is an American power blues guitarist. His style is sometimes compared to that of the Duane Allman, Jimi Hendrix, Eric Clapton, Lonnie Mack, Gov't Mule, and occasionally Warren Haynes. Moorman's parents owned a nightclub called the "Half-Way Inn" located halfway between Hamilton, Ohio and Middletown, Ohio on Ohio State Route 4 where he was able to watch musicians who played there, such as Lonnie Mack, from an early age. Moorman attended Michigan State University and also graduated from the Musicians Institute in Hollywood. He also owned a music lesson studio in Fairfield, Ohio called Rock School, and now offers guitar lessons out of 3rd Street Music in Hamilton, Ohio. He has been a member of Warren Zevon's touring band and the Tomcats with members of Sly and the Family Stone. One of his signature tunes is his cover of Lonnie Mack's Cincinnati Jail. Moorman sometimes plays a Jamonn Zeiler crafted Acoustic guitar and a 2004 model Gibson Flying V Reissue. On some tunes Sonny plays Slide guitar either upright or laptop. The band has opened for Johnny Winter in 2012.

== Band members ==
=== Former members ===
- Greg Day, drums and vocals
- Danny Paul, bass guitar and vocals
- Jeff Wilson, drums and vocals
- Red MacCormack, drums
- Elmer Monk, drums
- Gus Delao, drums
- Brian Sergi, drums
- Jimmy McNeely, drums
- Joe Clooney, drums and vocals
- Jamie Combs, drums and vocals
- "Bad Bob" Logsdon, bass guitar and vocals
- Denny Hymer, bass guitar and vocals
- Willy D – bass guitar and Vocals
- Nick Giese – bass guitar
- Jared Manker – bass guitar
- Mike Willis – bass guitar and vocals
- Raiford Faircloth- bass, guitar, and vocals
- Marc Hoffman – Bass Guitar
- Chris Perreault -- bass
- Dave Fair -- drums
- Mike Tetrault - Harmonica
- Mark Dudderar, drums and percussion and vocals
- Martin Horst – bass guitar
- Joe Cowels, guitar, vocals

=== Current members ===
Moorman currently does solo acoustic performances and he also makes several appearances a week with his band, the Sonny Moorman Group. They are:

- Sonny Moorman, guitar and vocals
- Lane Butler, drums
- Danny Thompson, bass guitar

== Discography ==
- Telegraph Road
- Sonny's Blues
- Crossroads Motel
- Sonny Moorman:Live at the Cincy Blues Fest
- Live as Hell
- More Live as Hell
- Lucky 13
