= Drop Down and Get Me =

Studio album by Del Shannon
- Released: December 1981
- Studios: Paradise Studios, Cherokee Recording Studios
- Genre: Rock
- Length: 39:23
- Label: Network
- Producer: Tom Petty

Del Shannon chronology
...And The Music Plays On (1978)	Drop Down and Get Me (1981)	Rock On! (1991)

Drop Down and Get Me is the eleventh studio album by American rock and roll singer-songwriter Del Shannon. It was considered a comeback album and released in December 1981 after some delay. The album was produced by Tom Petty and included the Heartbreakers as a backing band. It was the last album of new material Shannon released in his lifetime.

Edsel Records included the album in the 2023 Stranger in Town: A Del Shannon Compendium box set.

== Singles ==
The first single from the album, "Sea of Love", debuted on the Billboard Hot 100 chart on December 14, 1981, peaking at number thirty-three during a 12-week chart stay. It also peaked at number thirty-three on the Cash Box singles chart during a 14-week stay. On the adult contemporary charts, it reached number 36 in Billboard's January 23, 1982, issue, and number 28 in Canada's RPM magazine.

== Critical reception ==
Professional ratings
Review scores
Source	Rating
AllMusic	3.5/5 stars
The Encyclopedia of Popular Music	3/5 stars
Fort McMurray Today	3/5 stars

Drop Down and Get Me was well received by critics at the time of its release. In a retrospective review, Cub Koda of AllMusic said Del Shannon "sounds great as well, writing nine of the 12 tracks assembled and turning in bang-up readings of Don Everly's 'Maybe Tomorrow,' the Rolling Stones' 'Out of Time' and Phil Phillips' classic 'Sea of Love'".

Billboard said the album maintains "a very mainstream, highly accessible commercial edge." Cashbox described the album as "pure unadulterated rock 'n' roll joy", stated that "songs like the title cut and 'Sucker for Your Love' stand as powerful rockers". Fort McMurray Today described the album as "terrific" and noted that "Del's voice remains a fascinating rock-and-roll instrument huge".

The Daily Sentinel called it "a good album". The Age praised The Heartbreakers for being "very much revived and greatly enhanced".

== Track listing ==
All tracks are written by Del Shannon, except where noted.

No.	Title	Writer(s)	Length
1.	"Sea of Love"	Phillip Baptiste, George Khoury	2:34
2.	"Life Without You"		3:50
3.	"Out of Time"	Mick Jagger, Keith Richards	3:58
4.	"Sucker for Your Love"		3:23
5.	"To Love Someone"		3:15
6.	"Drop Down and Get Me"		3:26
7.	"Maybe Tomorrow"	Don Everly, Phil Everly	3:02
8.	"Liar"		3:14
9.	"Never Stop Tryin'"		3:28
10.	"Midnight Train"		3:14
11.	"Cheap Love"		3:01
12.	"Help Me"	Shannon, Frank Esler-Smith	2:59

== Personnel ==
- Del Shannon – lead vocals, background vocals, rhythm guitar
- Mike Campbell – lead guitar, bass guitar
- Benmont Tench – organ
- Ron Blair – bass guitar on "To Love Someone", "Maybe Tomorrow", and "Midnight Train"
- Howie Epstein – bass guitar on "Out of Time"
- Stan Lynch – drums
- Tom Petty – background vocals on "Out of Time", harmonica, tambourine
- Phil Seymour – background vocals on "Out of Time" and "Drop Down and Get Me"
- Jude Cole – background vocals on "Out of Time" and "Drop Down and Get Me"
- Phil Jones – percussion
- Marty Jourard - saxophone
- Kym Westover – background vocals
- David White – bass guitar
