= Madison Records (Grey Gull) =

Former record label

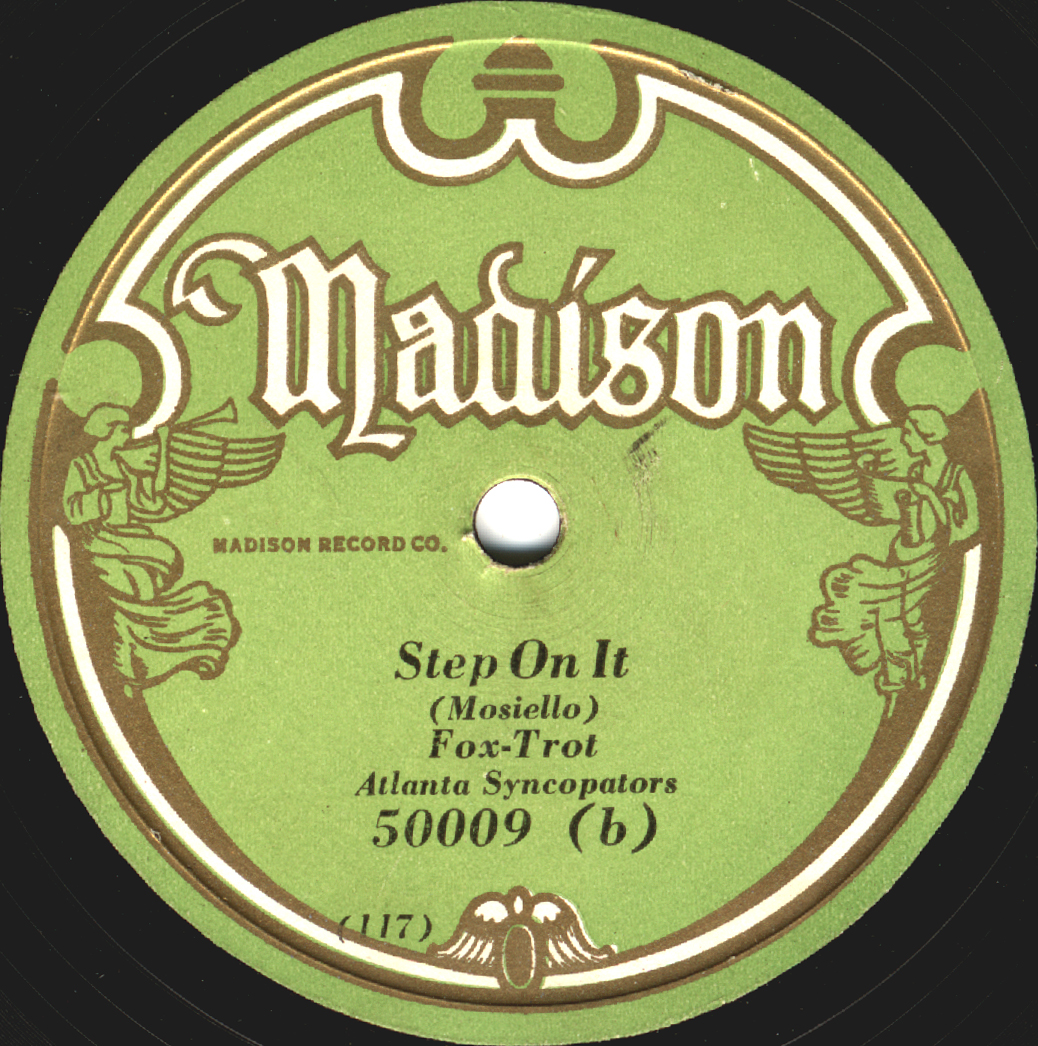
Label of a Madison Record from circa 1929.

Madison Records was a United States-based record label. It was also sold in the United Kingdom through the F.W. Woolworth dime store chain. It was a subsidiary of Grey Gull Records, produced from 1926 through 1931 (almost a year after the last record on the Grey Gull label was issued). General opinion among the knowledgeable record collectors of this era is that Madison, being sold at Woolworth's, survived for a while after Grey Gull and their other labels due to fulfilling the Woolworth contract.

Like Grey Gull, Madison records were often poorly recorded and made from the same cheap material. Much of Madison's material duplicates other Grey Gull labels issues, but some material appeared only on Madison. Unlike the other Grey Gull subsidiaries, Madison Records labels and advertising made no reference to the parent company.

Issues include popular dance music and songs of the time, mostly recorded by studio musicians in New York City. There are a few jazz sides of interest, as well as some Hawaiian music and Wurlitzer organ solos on Madison records. Audio fidelity, is about average to somewhat below average for the era, pressed in below average quality shellac.

== See also ==
- List of record labels
