= This Is My Bag =

Studio album by Del Shannon
- Released: July 1966
- Genre: Rock and roll
- Length: 29:05
- Label: Liberty
- Producer: Snuff Garrett

Del Shannon chronology
1,661 Seconds with Del Shannon (1965)	This Is My Bag (1966)	Total Commitment (1966)

Singles from This Is My Bag
- 1. "The Big Hurt" Released: March 4, 1966; 2. "For a Little While" Released: May 13, 1966

This Is My Bag is the seventh studio album by American rock and roll singer-songwriter Del Shannon, and his first for Liberty Records, Released in July 1966, it features the singles "The Big Hurt" and "For a Little While".

The single "The Big Hurt", debuted on the Billboard Hot 100 in the issue dated May 7, 1966, and peaked at number 94 during an three-weeks stay on the chart. It reached number 93 on the Cashbox singles chart and stayed on the chart during its two-weeks stay.

The album was released on compact disc by Beat Goes On on March 19, 1996, as tracks 1 through 12 on a pairing of two albums on one CD with tracks 13 through 24 consisting of Shannon's 1996 album, Total Commitment Bear Family included also the album in the 2004 Home and Away box set. Edsel Records included the album in the 2023 Stranger in Town: A Del Shannon Compendium box set.

== Background ==
Liberty wanted to get an album out on him, Snuff Garrett would produce again. Snuff had a different idea in mind. This time, Snuff used Nick DeCaro as arranger versus Leon Russell, it just seems odd that Shannon's easy-going "Hey Little Star" was in stark contrast to his growly plug side, As Bourgoise explanined it, "Del was never really encouraged to write. Liberty's solution was to have Del go in and cover all of these songs that were, at the time, climbing the charts. He basically fell into whatever Liberty wanted him to do.

== Critical reception ==
Professional ratings
Review scores
Source	Rating
AllMusic	3.5/5 stars
Record Mirror	3/5 stars
The Encyclopedia of Popular Music	2/5 stars
Billboard	4/5 stars

Bruce Eder of AllMusic said that "as a single, "The Big Hurt" (which utilized his all-but-trademarked melodion sound) even charted in the U.S. Top 100, and he even managed to work a trio of very satisfying originals in amid the covers of songs such as "Kicks," "Lightning Strikes," and "When You Walk in the Room."

Record Mirror notes "He can find better material certainly he has written far better".

== Track listing ==
=== Side one ===
No.	Title	Writer(s)	Length
1.	"The Big Hurt"	Wayne Shanklin	2:10
2.	"Kicks"	Barry Mann, Cynthia Weil	2:20
3.	"For a Little While"		2:26
4.	"Lightnin' Strikes"	Lou Christie, Twyla Herbert	2:05
5.	"When You Walk in the Room"	Jackie DeShannon	2:11
6.	"The Cheater"	John Krenski	2:35

=== Side two ===
No.	Title	Writer(s)	Length
1.	"Oh, Pretty Woman"	Roy Orbison, Bill Dees	2:38
2.	"Everybody Loves a Clown"	Snuff Garrett, Gary Lewis, Leon Russell	2:21
3.	"Never Thought I Could"		2:23
4.	"It's Too Late"	Bobby Goldsboro	2:19
5.	"Hey! Little Star"		2:34
6.	"Action"	Tommy Boyce, Steve Venet	1:53

== Charts ==
=== Singles ===
Year	Title	US Hot 100
1966	"The Big Hurt"	94
