= Rock On! (Del Shannon album) =

Studio album by Del Shannon
- Released: October 1991
- Recorded: 1989–1990
- Studios: Rumbo, Sunset Sound, MC, Posh
- Genre: Rock
- Labels: Silvertone; Gone Gator/MCA
- Producers: Mike Campbell, Jeff Lynne

Del Shannon chronology
Drop Down and Get Me (1981)	Rock On! (1991)	Home and Away (2006)

Rock On! is an album by the American musician Del Shannon, released posthumously in October 1991.

Edsel Records included the album in the 2023 Stranger in Town: A Del Shannon Compendium box set.

== Production ==
The album was produced by Mike Campbell and Jeff Lynne. Shannon unexpectedly committed suicide in February 1990 with work on the album mostly complete. Tom Petty and some of the Heartbreakers played on Rock On! Richard Greene played the fiddle on "Let's Dance". "What Kind of Fool Do You Think I Am?" is a cover of the Tams song. George Harrison played guitar on "I Got You"; he also contributed backing vocals to "Hot Love", a B-side to "Callin' Out My Name".

== Critical reception ==
Professional ratings
Review scores
Source	Rating
AllMusic	3.5/5 stars
Calgary Herald	C
Chicago Tribune	2/4 stars
The Encyclopedia of Popular Music	2/5 stars
Goldmine	4/5 stars
Los Angeles Daily News	2/4 stars
The Rolling Stone Album Guide	3/5 stars

The Calgary Herald lamented that "you'll hear a tired-sounding old rocker making one more half-hearted stab at a comeback." The Edmonton Journal noted that "Shannon was always a first-class writer of merry melodies and ringing country guitar licks that poured upbeat empathy on our saddest moments." The Indianapolis Star panned the production, writing that "the 10 songs are Electric Light Orchestra layered over '60s-style rock."

Tim Sendra of AllMusic described the album as "passionate, dramatic, emotional, and full of great songs... Most of all it has that amazing voice, and yes, Shannon's majestic voice is as strong as ever here."

== Track listing ==
All tracks are written by Del Shannon, except where noted.

No.	Title	Writer(s)	Length
1.	"Walk Away"	Del Shannon, Tom Petty, Jeff Lynne	3:37
2.	"Who Left Who?"		3:20
3.	"Are You Lovin' Me Too"		3:14
4.	"Callin' Out My Name"		3:44
5.	"I Go to Pieces"		3:59
6.	"Lost in a Memory"		3:35
7.	"I Got You (The Birds' Song)"		3:41
8.	"What Kind of Fool Do You Think I Am?"	Ray Whitley	3:15
9.	"When I Had You"		4:17
10.	"Let's Dance"		3:31

== Personnel ==
- Del Shannon – vocals, guitar
- Jeff Lynne – guitar, keyboards, bass guitar, backing vocals
- Mike Campbell – guitar, keyboards, bass guitar, backing vocals
- Tom Petty – guitar, backing vocals
- Benmont Tench – accordion, organ, piano
- Howie Epstein – backing vocals
- Phil Jones – drums, backing vocals
- George Harrison - guitar, backing vocals
- Richard Greene – fiddle on "Let's Dance"
- Phil Hatton – backing vocals
- Randy Jones – backing vocals
- Andrew Williams – backing vocals
- David Williams – backing vocals
- David Campbell – string arrangement

Production:

- Jeff Lynne – producer
- Mike Campbell – producer, engineer
- William Bottrell – engineer
- Richard Dodd – engineer, mixing
- Mark Linett – engineer, mixing
- Bill Bottrell – mixing
