= Stranger in Town (Del Shannon song) =

Single by Del Shannon

from the album 1,661 Seconds with Del Shannon
- B-side: "Over You"
- Released: February 27, 1965
- Recorded: October 1964
- Studio: Bell Sound Studios
- Genre: Rock and roll
- Length: 2:28
- Label: Amy
- Songwriter: Del Shannon
- Producer: Harry Balk

"Stranger in Town" is a 1965 song by Del Shannon. Written by Shannon, it is the opening track on the album 1,661 Seconds with Del Shannon. It was released as a single, a follow-up (both chronologically and thematically) to Shannon's top-10 hit "Keep Searchin' (We'll Follow the Sun)", but was not as successful, reaching number four in Canada, number 30 on the Billboard Hot 100 chart in the USA, and number 40 on the UK's Record Retailer chart. "Stranger in Town" was Shannon's last top-40 hit in the US of the 1960s.

"Stranger in Town"... it's one long bleat of terror, the singer and his lover pursued by some unnamable person for reasons just beyond the fringe of rational understanding.

— Dave Marsh, The Heart of Rock & Soul

Dave Marsh, in his 1989 book The Heart of Rock & Soul: The 1001 Greatest Singles Ever Made, ranked "Stranger in Town"' as the 327th best rock or soul single to that date, ahead of Shannon's bigger hits "Keep Searching" (371st in Marsh's book) and "Runaway" (534th).

Howard DeWitt's biography of Shannon is titled Stranger in Town after the song.
