= The Further Adventures of Charles Westover =

Studio album by Del Shannon
- Released: March 1968
- Genre: Psychedelic pop; garage
- Length: 42:40
- Label: Liberty
- Producer: Dan Bourgoise, Dugg Brown

Del Shannon chronology
Total Commitment (1966)	The Further Adventures of Charles Westover (1968)	Live in England (1973)

Singles from The Further Adventures of Charles Westover
- 1. "Thinkin' It Over" Released: March 1968; 2. "Gemini" Released: May 9, 1968

The Further Adventures of Charles Westover is the ninth studio album by American singer-songwriter Del Shannon, released in March 1968 by Liberty Records. His final album for the label, it features the singles "Thinkin' It Over" and "Gemini". The album failed to reach the charts.

Bear Family included also the album in the 2004 Home and Away box set. Edsel Records included the album in the 2023 Stranger in Town: A Del Shannon Compendium box set.

== Background and composition ==
The album's title included Shannon's birth name, following the example of other artists like Bobby Vee. It was the first album on which Shannon wrote or co-wrote each song. The recording sessions included Shannon on vocals and rhythm guitar, Dugg Brown as leader, Charles Wright and Al McKay (later of Earth, Wind & Fire) on guitars, Melvin Dunlap on bass, Bob Evans on drums, and Malcom "Mac" Rebennack (a.k.a. "Dr. John") on keyboards. The album's composition was noted for being progressive and experimental. It was produced by Magic Penny.

== Critical reception ==
Professional ratings
Review scores
Source	Rating
AllMusic	3.5/5 stars
Record Mirror	4/5 stars
The Encyclopedia of Popular Music	3/5 stars

The album was well received by critics at the time of its release. Chris Martin of the Los Angeles Times praised the vocals and composition of the album. Billboard described it as "a hip Shannon with something to say and saying it musically well."

It has also received positive retrospective reviews, with Donald A. Guarisco of AllMusic writing that Shannon "uses the cinematic quality of psychedelic pop to provide a vivid backdrop for his songwriting." In The Rough Guide to Cult Pop, Paul Simpson describes the album as "underrated".

Record Mirror notes "Psyche-Del Shannon with a Iot of ponderous sounds everywhere menacing guitar work and some good arrangements and backin".

== Track listing ==
=== Side one ===
All tracks are written by Del Shannon, except where noted.

No.	Title	Writer(s)	Length
1.	"Thinkin' It Over"	Beau James	2:59
2.	"Be My Friend"	Doug Brown	2:29
3.	"Silver Birch"		4:21
4.	"I Think I Love You"		3:24
5.	"River Cool"		3:54
6.	"Colour Flashing Hair"		2:49

=== Side two ===
No.	Title	Writer(s)	Length
1.	"Gemini"		3:25
2.	"Runnin' On Back"	Sharon Sheeley	3:41
3.	"Conquer"		3:15
4.	"Been So Long"	Brian Hyland	3:04
5.	"Magical Musical Box"		3:42
6.	"New Orleans (Mardi Gras)"	Jim Pulte	5:19
