= Total Commitment =

1966 studio album by Del Shannon

Studio album by Del Shannon
- Released: October 1966
- Genre: Rock and roll
- Length: 31:28
- Label: Liberty
- Producer: Dallas Smith

Del Shannon chronology
This Is My Bag (1966)	Total Commitment (1966)	The Further Adventures of Charles Westover (1968)

Singles from Total Commitment
- 1. "Show Me" Released: June 24, 1966; 2. "Under My Thumb" Released: August 5, 1966

Total Commitment is the eighth studio album by American rock and roll singer-songwriter Del Shannon, and his second for Liberty Records, Released in October 1966.

It includes multiple cover songs, including "Sunny", "Red Rubber Ball", and "Time Won't Let Me", as well as the singles "Show Me" and "Under My Thumb", which reached number 128 on Billboard's Bubbling Under Hot 100 Singles chart during its three-weeks stay. and number 99 on the Cashbox singles chart during its two-weeks stay.

The album was released on compact disc by Beat Goes On on March 19, 1996, as tracks 13 through 24 on a pairing of two albums on one CD with tracks 1 through 12 consisting of Shannon's 1966 Debut Liberty album, This Is My Bag Bear Family included also the album in the 2004 Home and Away box set. Edsel Records included the album in the 2023 Stranger in Town: A Del Shannon Compendium box set.

== Background ==
Liberty wanted to get Shannon back into the studio to record another album, and get another single or two in the mix. "What Makes You Run" and "I Can't Be True", both originals, "What Makes You Run" followed "Under My Thumb" in the sense of arrangement and instrumentation. He truly thought he had a winner with "Thumb" to be a hit."

Dan Bourgoise reflected on the second batch of cover songs: "If Del never did cover songs, that would be one thing. But he was always one who would do a few cover songs on his albums...[he] would find a song that he really liked that he thought he could add something to, to make it his own."

== Critical reception ==
Professional ratings
Review scores
Source	Rating
AllMusic	4/5 stars
Record Mirror	4/5 stars
The Encyclopedia of Popular Music	2/5 stars

Total Commitment received positive retrospective reviews. Bruce Eder of AllMusic said that "Total Commitment is almost a roots rock record compared with This Is My Bag, which preceded it, And even amid such classic compositions as 'Where Were You When I Needed You,' 'Time Won't Let Me,' and 'Summer in the City."

Record Mirror described the album as an "unpretentiously en-joyable Beat album".

Disc and Music Echo described the album as "disappointing."

The Honolulu Advertiser stated that Total Commitment is soul supreme, "Under My Thumb" and "Sunny" are standout. On the other hand, The Encyclopedia of Popular Music gave the album a four-star rating only, meaning that they believed that album was "A high standard album from the artist, and therefore highly recommended."

== Track listing ==
=== Side one ===
No.	Title	Writer(s)	Length
1.	"Under My Thumb"	Jagger/Richards	2:47
2.	"Red Rubber Ball"	Paul Simon, Bruce Woodley	2:50
3.	"She Was Mine"	Roy Nievelt	2:42
4.	"Where Were You When I Needed You"	P.F. Sloan, Steve Barri	2:54
5.	"The Joker Went Wild"	Bobby Russell	2:27
6.	"The Pied Piper"	Steve Duboff, Artie Kornfeld	2:07

=== Side two ===
No.	Title	Writer(s)	Length
1.	"Sunny"	Bobby Hebb	2:52
2.	"Show Me"		2:27
3.	"Time Won't Let Me"	Tom King, Chet Kelley	2:35
4.	"What Makes You Run"		2:42
5.	"I Can't Be True"		2:20
6.	"Summer in the City"	John Sebastian, Mark Sebastian, Steve Boone	2:45

== Charts ==
Singles

Year	Single	Chart	Peak
1966	"Under My Thumb"	US Billboard Hot 100	128
1966	"Under My Thumb"	US Cash Box	99
