= The Swiss Maid =

Song by Del Shannon
- Released: 1962
- Songwriter: Roger Miller

"The Swiss Maid" is a song written by country singer/songwriter Roger Miller, who recorded it in 1961 under the title "Fair Swiss Maiden".

== Cover versions ==
The song became a hit for Del Shannon in 1962, whose recording featured a distinctive yodel by the artist, popularly used in some country music of the time. The single peaked at number 64 on the US Billboard charts. It was the only record of Del Shannon's early career to cross to the Billboard Easy Listening chart, where it peaked at number 19. Outside the US, "The Swiss Maid" reached number two on the UK chart, number one in Australia, and number 17 in Canada.
