= Hats Off to Larry =

Single by Del Shannon
- B-side: "Don't Gild The Lily, Lily"
- Released: May 1961
- Genre: Rock and roll
- Length: 2:00
- Label: Bigtop
- Songwriter: Del Shannon

Del Shannon singles chronology
"Runaway" (1961)	"Hats Off to Larry" (1961)	"So Long, Baby" (1961)

"Hats Off to Larry" is a song written and sung by Del Shannon, which he released as a single in 1961. The song spent 13 weeks on the Billboard Hot 100 chart, peaking at No. 5, while reaching No. 1 on Canada's CHUM Hit Parade, No. 2 on New Zealand's "Lever Hit Parade", No. 2 in Australia, No. 6 on the UK's Record Retailer chart, and No. 8 in South Africa.

The song was ranked No. 68 on Billboard's end of year "Hot 100 for 1961 - Top Sides of the Year" and No. 35 on Cash Box's "Top 100 Chart Hits of 1961".

== Chart performance ==
Chart (1961)	Peak position
US Billboard Hot 100	5
Australia – David Kent	2
Canada – CHUM Hit Parade (2wks@1)	1
New Zealand – Lever Hit Parade	2
South Africa	8
UK – Record Retailer	6
UK – New Musical Express	8
