= Runaway (Del Shannon song) =

Single by Del Shannon

from the album Runaway with Del Shannon
- B-side: "Jody"
- Released: February 18, 1961
- Recorded: January 21, 1961
- Studio: Bell Sound (New York City)
- Genre: Rock and roll
- Length: 2:20
- Label: BigTop
- Songwriters: Del Shannon; Max Crook
- Producer: Harry Balk

Del Shannon singles chronology
"Runaway" (1961)	"Hats Off to Larry" (1961)

Official audio
- "Runaway" on YouTube

Audio sample
- "Runaway": file; help

"Runaway" is a 1961 number-one Billboard Hot 100 song by Del Shannon. It was written by Shannon and keyboardist Max Crook, and became a major international hit. It topped the Billboard charts for four consecutive weeks, and Billboard ranked it as the No. 5 song for 1961. It was No. 472 on the 2010 version of Rolling Stone's list of the 500 Greatest Songs of All Time and No. 466 on the 2004 version.

== Original recording ==
Singer-guitarist Charles Westover and keyboard player Max Crook performed together as members of "Charlie Johnson and the Big Little Show Band" in Battle Creek, Michigan, before their group won a recording contract in 1960. Westover took the new stage name "Del Shannon", and Crook, who had invented his own clavioline-based electric keyboard called a Musitron, became "Maximilian".

After their first recording session for Big Top Records in New York City had ended in failure, their manager Ollie McLaughlin persuaded them to rewrite and re-record an earlier song they had written, "Little Runaway", to highlight Crook's unusual instrumental sound. On January 21, 1961, they recorded "Runaway" at Bell Sound Studios in New York City, with Harry Balk as producer, Fred Weinberg as audio engineer and also session musicians on several sections: session musician Al Caiola on guitar, Moe Wechsler on piano, and Crook playing the central Musitron break. Other musicians on the record included Al Casamenti and Bucky Pizzarelli on guitar, Milt Hinton on bass, and Joe Marshall on drums. Bill Ramall, who was the arranger for the session, also played baritone sax. After recording in A minor, producer Balk sped up the recording to pitch just below a B-flat minor. "Runaway" was released in February 1961 and was immediately successful. On April 10 of that year, Shannon appeared on Dick Clark's American Bandstand, helping to catapult it to the number one spot on the Billboard Hot 100, where it remained for four weeks. Two months later, it reached number one on the UK's Record Retailer chart, spending three weeks in that position. On Billboard's Hot R&B Sides, "Runaway" peaked at number three.

The song was ranked No. 5 on Billboard's end of year "Hot 100 for 1961 – Top Sides of the Year" and No. 9 on Cash Box's "Top 100 Chart Hits of 1961". Shannon was awarded a silver disc by Disc magazine for the sales of over 250,000 copies of "Runaway" in the UK.

=== Weekly charts ===
Chart (1961)	Peak position
Australia (Music Maker)	1
Belgium (Flanders – Juke Box)	4
Belgium (Wallonia – Juke Box)	3
Canada (CHUM Hit Parade) (4wks@1)	1
Chile	1
Ireland (Dublin Herald and Mail)	2
Netherlands (Platennieuws)	2
New Zealand (Lever Hit Parade)	1
Norway (VG-lista)	4
UK New Musical Express	1
UK Record Retailer	1
US Billboard Hot 100	1
US Billboard Hot R&B Sides	3
US Cash Box Top 100	1
US Cash Box Records Disc Jockeys Played Most	1
US Cash Box Top Ten Juke Box Tunes	1
US Cash Box Top 50 in R&B Locations	4

=== Year-end charts ===
Chart (1961)	Rank
Australia	2
UK	4
US Billboard Hot 100	5
US Cash Box Top 100	9

==== All-time charts ====
Chart (2018)	Position
US Billboard Hot 100	364

== Other recordings ==
Del Shannon re-recorded "Runaway" in 1967, intended for his album Home and Away (shelved until 2006), with John Paul Jones, Nicky Hopkins and Jimmy Page as session musicians. This version was issued as a single, and reached No. 122 on Billboard's Bubbling Under the Hot 100, the Top 20 in Australia, and No. 12 in Canada.

Shannon re-recorded the song a second time in 1986, this time as the theme music for the NBC television series Crime Story, which starred Dennis Farina and was set in the early 1960s. This version featured new lyrics to make the song more fitting for a crime drama.

Shannon appeared on Late Night With David Letterman on February 10, 1987, performing "Runaway" with Paul Shaffer and the World's Most Dangerous Band. Letterman introduced Shannon as having sold as many as 80,000 singles of "Runaway" per day at its peak in popularity.

The best-known original version is in mono. However, in subsequent compilations a different take from the same recording sessions is available in stereo.

== Lyrics ==
The song is sung from the point of view of a man whose girlfriend has left him. She is mostly referred to in the third person, but she is briefly addressed in the second person in the lyric "wishin' you were here by me".

== Certifications ==
Region	Certification	Certified units/sales
United Kingdom (BPI)	Silver	200,000^{‡}
^{‡} Sales+streaming figures based on certification alone.

== Covers ==
- In 1962, an instrumental version was released by Lawrence Welk and His Orchestra. Welk's version spent 6 weeks on the Billboard Hot 100 chart, reaching No. 56, while reaching No. 5 in Hong Kong, and No. 8 on Canada's CHUM Hit Parade.
- A version by the Small Faces was released on From the Beginning in June 1967.
- Elvis Presley covered the song while performing at the International Hotel in Las Vegas in August 1969, appearing on the 1970 album On Stage. During Presley's August 26, 1969 midnight show, Presley performed "Runaway" and then introduced Del Shannon in the audience. This performance was later released on the box set Collectors' Gold. Years later, Shannon would relate this story to Bob Costas on his late-night television program Later with Bob Costas.
- In 1974, Dave, a Dutch singer who sings in French, covered the song under the title "Vanina", the song having been adapted by Patrick Loiseau. "Vanina" reached No. 1 in France and No. 27 in Flanders. Dave also covered the song in German in 1975 ("Mein Mädchen Monika") and Spanish ("Vanesa"). In 2011, he released a soul version of "Vanina" on the album Blue Eyed Soul, along with a music video, that reached No. 90 in France.
- In 1975, Charlie Kulis, a schoolteacher from New York, released a cover version on Playboy Records. Promotion for the single included an appearance on American Bandstand. Kulis's version spent eight weeks on the U.S. Billboard Hot 100, reaching No. 46, while reaching No. 40 on Billboard's Easy Listening chart.
- In 1977, Bonnie Raitt included a bluesy version of the song on her album Sweet Forgiveness. Also released as a single, it reached No. 57 on the U.S. Billboard Hot 100.
- Narvel Felts covered the song in 1978 and took it to No. 30 on the Hot Country Singles charts.
- In 1986, Luis Cardenas, lead singer of the rock band Renegade, reached No. 83 on the US Billboard Hot 100 with his cover version, which is best remembered for its live action/animated video that features cameo appearances by Del Shannon and Donny Osmond.
- In 1987, Swedish pop legend Fredrik Willstrand recorded a cover version for his eponymous album.
- The supergroup Traveling Wilburys recorded a version of the song in 1990, with Jeff Lynne singing lead vocals; it was released on a 2007 CD reissue of Traveling Wilburys Vol. 3.
- Australian artist Ed Kuepper included a 10-minute live version of the song on The Aints 1991 album S.L.S.Q – Very Live!
- A cover by Gary Allan reached No. 74 on the Hot Country Singles & Tracks chart in 2000, despite not being officially released as a single.

== See also ==
- List of Hot 100 number-one singles of 1961 (U.S.)
- List of number-one singles from the 1960s (UK)
