= Keep Searchin' (We'll Follow the Sun) =

Single by Del Shannon

from the album 1,661 Seconds with Del Shannon
- B-side: "Broken Promises"
- Released: November 1964
- Recorded: September 20, 1964
- Genre: Rock and roll, surf rock
- Length: 2:10
- Label: Amy
- Songwriter: Del Shannon

Del Shannon singles chronology
"Do You Want to Dance" (1964)	"Keep Searchin' (We'll Follow the Sun)" (1964)	"Stranger in Town" (1965)

"Keep Searchin' (We'll Follow the Sun)" is a song written by the American rock-and-roll musician Del Shannon. It was written, recorded, and released in 1964. The song is in the key of A minor. Its lyrics tell the story of a man who tries to find a place to hide himself and his beleaguered girlfriend from those who abuse her. The song ends with a sequence of very high notes.

The B-side of "Keep Searchin'" was "Broken Promises." Both songs were recorded in October 1964, along with two other Shannon songs: "Stranger in Town" and "Over You." All four songs were written by Shannon himself.

== Chart performance ==
Shannon's final Top Ten hit, "Keep Searchin'" spent 14 weeks on the Billboard Hot 100 chart, peaking at No. 9, while reaching No. 3 on the UK's Record Retailer chart, No. 6 on the Irish Singles Chart, No. 6 on Norway's VG-lista, No. 14 on Canada's RPM "Top 40 & 5", No. 2 on Sweden's Kvällstoppen, and No. 17 in Germany.
