= Max Crook =

American musician (1936–2020)

- Also known as: Maximilian
- Born: Maxfield Doyle Crook; November 2, 1936; Lincoln, Nebraska, U.S.
- Origin: Ann Arbor, Michigan
- Died: July 1, 2020 (aged 83)
- Genre: Pop
- Occupations: Musician, composer
- Instruments: Keyboards, synthesizer
- Labels: Dot Records, Double A Records

Maxfield Doyle Crook (November 2, 1936 – July 1, 2020) was an American musician, a pioneer of electronic music in pop. He was the featured soloist on Del Shannon's 1961 hit "Runaway", which he co-wrote and on which he played his own invention, the Musitron. He also recorded as Maximilian.

== Biography ==
=== Early life and career ===
Crook was born in Lincoln, Nebraska, to Clarence and Helen Crook. The family moved to Ann Arbor, Michigan, when Crook was a child. His grandfather, Doyle Mullikin, had musical talent as a United Brethren Minister. Helen Crook was classically trained as a pianist in her early schooling and graduated from college with a degree in music. Crook first learned to play the accordion before taking up the piano, and by the time he was fourteen he had already built his own studio. In 1957, after studying at the University of New Mexico, he enrolled at Western Michigan University in Kalamazoo. There, he formed a rock and roll group called The White Bucks, who released a single, "Get That Fly", on Dot Records in 1959.

In the same year he built a monophonic synthesizer, which he called the Musitron, out of a clavioline heavily enhanced with additional resistors, television tubes, and parts from household appliances, old amplifiers, and reel-to-reel tape machines. Crook was unable to patent the Musitron because most of its components were previously patented products. He first used it for recording at a session at Berry Gordy's studio in Detroit, on an unreleased version of "Bumble Boogie" (the tune later recorded by B. Bumble and the Stingers) for which he also used a crude self-made four-track tape recorder. The sound of the Musitron was influential on other musicians and producers, including Gordy, Joe Meek, Ennio Morricone, John Barry, and Roy Wood.

Later in 1959, he met Charles Westover, yet to take the stage name Del Shannon, who asked him to join his band, "Charlie Johnson and the Big Little Show Band", as keyboard player. They signed a recording contract in 1960, and Crook began playing the Musitron onstage for the first time soon afterwards. During a live set one night at the Hi-Lo Club in Battle Creek, Michigan, Crook hit upon an unusual chord change going from A-minor to G, and he and Del Shannon co-wrote and developed the lick into a song, which became "Runaway". In January 1961, Shannon and Crook recorded "Runaway" at Bell Sound Studios for Big Top Records in New York City, and it soon became an international hit. When "Runaway" was hitting the top of the record charts in 1961, there was a contest on American Bandstand to guess the musical instrument playing on the bridge in the song. "Runaway" is #472 on Rolling Stone's 500 Greatest Songs of All Time from 2010.

Crook also recorded a series of instrumentals, credited as Maximilian. These included "The Snake" (a hit in Argentina), and later "The Twistin' Ghost" and "Greyhound" (both hits in Canada at #11 and #34). For a time he took over as leader of Shannon's old band based in Battle Creek, Michigan, which became "The Maximilian Band", but he left the group in late 1962 for a solo career. He also set up his own record label, Double A, in Ann Arbor. Later in the 1960s, he worked as an electronic musical duo with Scott Ludwig, billed as "The Sounds of Tomorrow", performing instrumental versions of current hits.

=== Later career ===
In the late 1960s, Crook and his family moved to California where he worked as a burglar alarm installer and Ventura County Firefighter, before returning to recording with Del Shannon and Brian Hyland. Hyland's version of Curtis Mayfield's "Gypsy Woman", featuring Crook's keyboards, became a hit in 1970. Crook also wrote the score for James Sturgen's movie Time and Beyond. In the 1980s, he began traveling and performing gospel and spiritual music, resulting in recording an album called Good News!

In 2003, he was featured on Joe G & the Zippity Doo Wop Band's remake of Del Shannon's "So Long Baby" playing the honking Musitron riff from Shannon's recording, as well as a solo in the higher "Runaway" register that would have replaced the kazoo solo in the 1961 record had they not run out of tracks. He can be seen in the group's music video of the song filmed in Shannon's hometown of Coopersville, Michigan. In September 2004, he also performed at a tribute show to Shannon (1934–90) in Saratoga, New York, with Joe Glickman (Joe G), only his second time in the Empire State since recording "Runaway" over 40 years earlier.

=== Death ===
Crook died on July 1, 2020, aged 83.
