= Amy Records =

American record label, subsidiary

DJ copy of Kinetic Energy 1969 Amy 45

Amy Records was an American record label formed in 1960 as a subsidiary of Bell Records.

Amy-signed artists considered successful (financial return, chart positions, mainstream name recognition) included Al Brown's Tunetoppers (with the dance tune "The Madison" catalog number Amy 804 charted #23), in 1960; Joey Powers' "Midnight Mary" (Amy 892 charted #10 in 1964)., Del Shannon's 1964 recordings of "Handy Man" (Amy 905 charted #22) and "Keep Searchin'" (Amy 915 charted #9). Lee Dorsey hit with "Ride Your Pony" in 1965 (Amy 927 charted #28) and "Working in the Coal Mine" in 1966 (Amy 958 charted #8).

Paul Simon, (pre-dating Simon & Garfunkel), together with the children's music producer and songwriter Bobby Susser, released records in 1961 and 1962 under the names Tico and the Triumphs with "Motorcycle" (Amy 835 charted #97) and Jerry Landis with "Lone Teen Ranger" (Amy 875 charted #99") with little success as did garage band Kinetic Energy with their version of Dale Hawkins' 1957 hit "Susie Q" (Amy 11,028) in 1969.

Beginning in 1967, albums by Amy recording artists were issued on the Bell label, and in 1969, Amy was folded into Bell. Ronnie In 1961, some of the assets from Madison Records were given to Amy Records. Shortly afterward the label released "Play Me a Sad Song", and "It Means a Lot to Them", which were sung by Paul Simon.

== See also ==
- List of record labels
