= Bigtop Records =

- Founder: Johnny Bienstock
- Country of origin: United States

Bigtop Records was an American record label started by music executive Johnny Bienstock (brother of Freddy Bienstock) and the major music publisher Hill & Range Music and was co-owned along with Big Top Record Distributors (sic). Hit artists included Del Shannon, Johnny and the Hurricanes, Lou Johnson, Sammy Turner, Don Covay, Don and Juan and Toni Fisher. Big Top Record Distributors also distributed Paul Case's Dunes Records label in the early 60's, which had hits from Ray Peterson ("Corrina, Corrina") and Curtis Lee ("Pretty Little Angel Eyes"), both records produced by Phil Spector. By 1964, ABC-Paramount Records distributed Bigtop's output. Bell Records briefly distributed Bigtop prior to the label closing, around 1965. Bigtop also released two Mad magazine music parody themed albums; Mad Twists Rock 'n' Roll and Fink Along with Mad in 1963.

In the UK, Bigtop licensed its records to London Records. Its current UK licensees are Ace Records (United Kingdom).

There was a subsidiary, Big Hill Records, which issued a few singles by Lou Johnson after Bigtop closed.

== See also ==
- List of record labels
