= Del Shannon =

American musician (1934–1990)

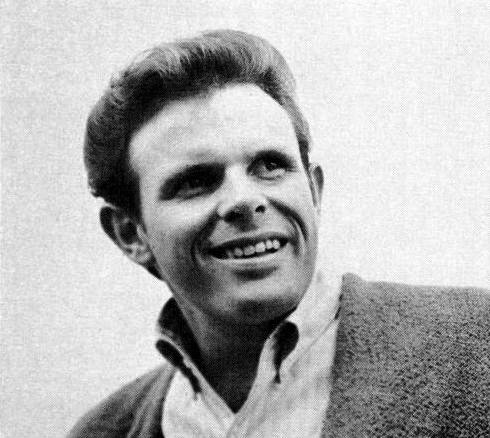
- Shannon in 1965

Background information
- Born: Charles Weedon Westover; December 30, 1934; Coopersville, Michigan, U.S.
- Died: February 8, 1990 (aged 55) Santa Clarita, California, U.S.
- Genres: Rock and roll; country
- Occupations: Singer; songwriter
- Instruments: Vocals; guitar
- Years active: 1954–1989
- Labels: Bigtop; Network; London; Twirl; Berlee; Amy; Liberty; Dunhill; United Artists; Island; Elektra; Silvertone
- Website: delshannon.com

Charles Weedon Westover (December 30, 1934 – February 8, 1990), known professionally as Del Shannon, was an American musician, singer, and songwriter, best known for his 1961 number-one Billboard hit "Runaway", which was covered later by various major artists, including Elvis Presley and the Traveling Wilburys. In 1999, he was posthumously inducted into the Rock and Roll Hall of Fame. In addition to his music career, he had minor acting roles.

== Biography ==
Shannon was born Charles Weedon Westover on December 30, 1934, in Coopersville, Michigan, to Bert and Leone Mosher Westover. He learned to play the ukulele and guitar and listened to country-and-western music by artists such as Hank Williams, Hank Snow, and Lefty Frizzell. He was drafted into the Army in 1954, and while in Germany, played guitar in a band called the Cool Flames. When his service ended, he returned to Battle Creek, Michigan, and worked as a carpet salesman and as a truck driver for a furniture factory. He found part-time work as a rhythm guitarist in singer Doug DeMott's group, the Moonlight Ramblers, working at the Hi-Lo Club.

When DeMott was fired in 1958 for drunkenness, Westover took over as leader and singer, giving himself the name Charlie Johnson and renaming the band the Big Little Show Band. In early 1959, he added keyboardist Max Crook, who played an instrument he called a Musitron (an early synthesizer of Crook's own invention, though modeled on the commercially released Clavioline). Crook had made recordings, and he persuaded Ann Arbor disc jockey Ollie McLaughlin to listen to the band. McLaughlin took the group's demonstration recordings (demos) to Harry Balk and Irving Micahnik of Talent Artists in Detroit. In July 1960, Westover and Crook signed to become recording artists and composers for Bigtop Records. Balk suggested Westover use a new name, and they came up with "Del Shannon", combining Mark Shannon—a wrestling pseudonym used by a regular at the Hi-Lo Club—with Del, derived from the Cadillac Coupe de Ville, his favorite car.

=== Success ===
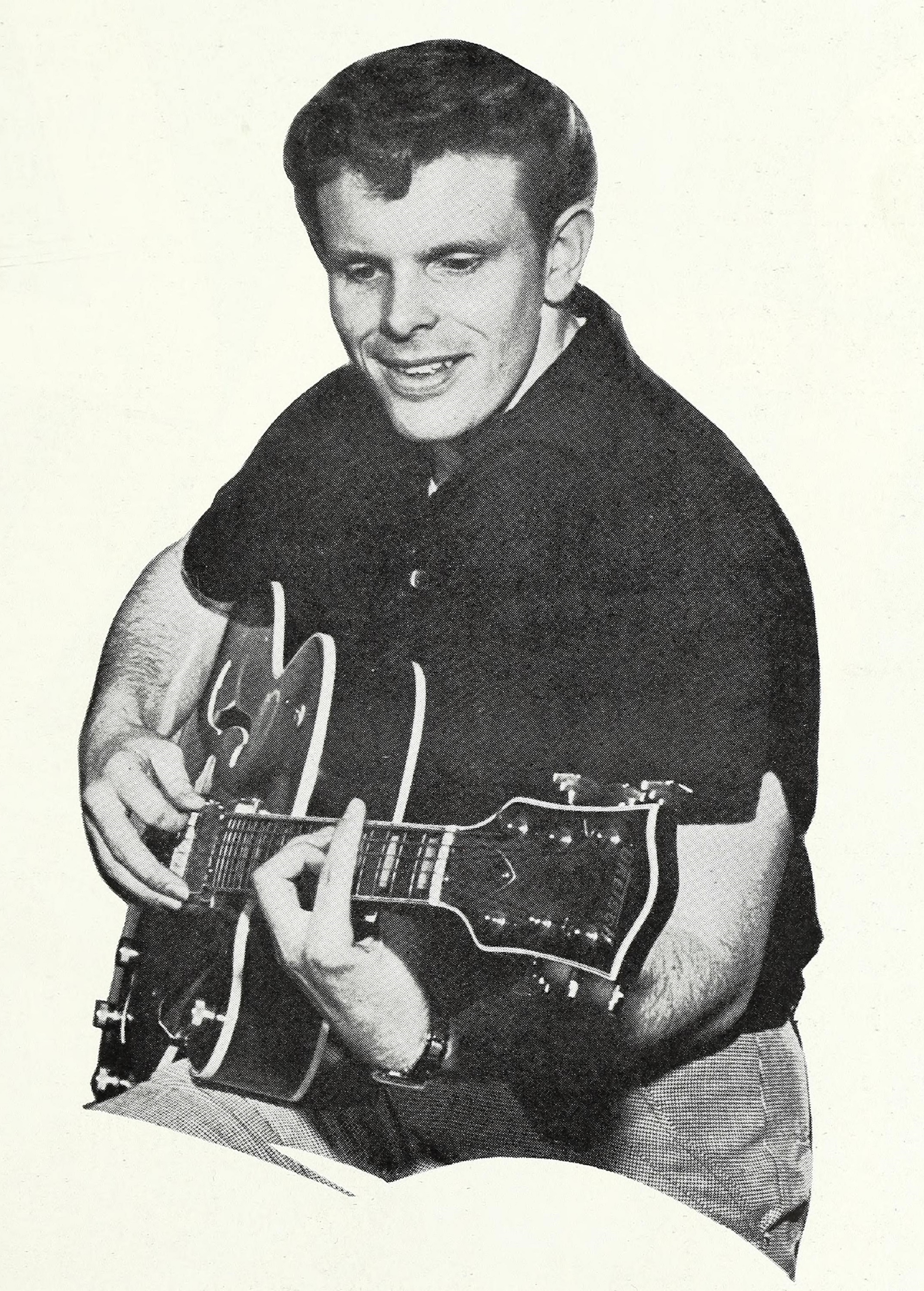
Shannon on the cover of Cash Box, July 29, 1961

He flew to New York City, but his first sessions were not successful. McLaughlin then persuaded Shannon and Crook to rewrite and re-record one of their earlier songs, originally called "Little Runaway", using the Musitron as lead instrument. On January 21, 1961, they recorded "Runaway", which was released as a single in February 1961, reaching number one on the Billboard chart in April. Shannon followed with "Hats Off to Larry", which peaked at number five on the Billboard chart and number two on the Cashbox chart in 1961, and the less-popular "So Long, Baby", another song of breakup bitterness. "Runaway" and "Hats Off to Larry" were recorded in a day.

=== Berlee Records and Amy Records ===
By August 1963, Shannon's relationship with his managers and Bigtop had soured, so he formed his own label, Berlee Records, named after his parents.

He returned to the charts immediately with "Handy Man" (a 1960 hit by Jimmy Jones), "Do You Wanna Dance" (a 1958 hit by Bobby Freeman), and two originals, "Keep Searchin'" (number three in the UK, number nine in the US), and "Stranger in Town" (number 40 in the UK). In late 1964, Shannon produced a demo session for a young fellow Michigander named Bob Seger, who went on to stardom much later. Shannon gave acetates of the session to Dick Clark (he had performed in one of Clark's tours in 1965), and by 1966, Seger was recording for Philadelphia's famed Cameo Records, resulting in some regional hits, which eventually led to a deal with a major label, Capitol Records. Also in late 1964, Shannon paid tribute to one of his own musical idols with Del Shannon Sings Hank Williams (Amy Records 8004). The album was recorded in hardcore country honky-tonk style, and no single was released. Shannon opened for Ike and Tina Turner at Dave Hull's Hullabaloo Club in Los Angeles, California, on December 22, 1965.

=== Liberty Records, United Artists Records, and Island Records ===
Shannon signed with Liberty in 1966 and revived Toni Fisher's "The Big Hurt" and the Rolling Stones' "Under My Thumb". Peter and Gordon released his song "I Go to Pieces" in 1965.

In September 1967, Shannon began laying down the tracks for The Further Adventures of Charles Westover, which was highly regarded by fans and critics alike, despite disappointing sales. The album yielded two 1968 singles, "Thinkin' It Over" and "Gemini". In October 1968, Liberty Records released their 10th (in the United States) and final Shannon single, a cover of Dee Clark's 1961 hit "Raindrops". This brought to a close a commercially disappointing period in Shannon's career. In 1972, he signed with United Artists and recorded Live in England, released in June 1973. Reviewer Chris Martin critiqued the album favourably, saying that Shannon never improvised, was always true to the original sounds of his music, and only Lou Christie rivaled his falsetto. In April 1975, he signed with Island Records.

After his manager and he jointly sought back royalties for Shannon, Bug Music was founded in 1975 to administer his songs. By 2011, when Bug was acquired by BMG Rights Management, its catalogue had grown to include 250,000 compositions.

A 1976 article on Shannon's concert at the Roxy Theatre described the singer as "personal, pure, and simple rock 'n' roll, dated but gratifyingly undiluted." Shannon sang some of his new rock songs along with classics such as "Endless Sleep" and "The Big Hurt". The Los Angeles Times wrote, "Shannon's haunting vignettes of heartbreak and restlessness contain something of a cosmic undercurrent, which has the protagonist tragically doomed to a bleak, shadowy struggle."

=== Later career ===
Shannon's career slowed down greatly in the 1970s, owing in part to his alcoholism. Welsh rock singer Dave Edmunds produced the single "And the Music Plays On" in 1974. In 1978, Shannon stopped drinking and began work on "Sea of Love", released in 1982 on his album Drop Down and Get Me, produced by Tom Petty. The album took two years to record and featured Petty's band, the Heartbreakers, backing Shannon. However, RSO Records, to which Shannon was signed, folded. Further work on the LP was done for Network Records (distributed by Elektra Records). Seven songs are Shannon originals with covers of songs recorded by the Everly Brothers, the Rolling Stones, and Frankie Ford, along with "Sea of Love" by Phil Phillips. It was Shannon's first album in eight years.

In February 1982, Shannon appeared at the Bottom Line. He performed pop-rock tunes and old hits. Stephen Holden, a reviewer for The New York Times, described an "easygoing pop-country" style. On "Runaway" and "Keep Searchin'", Shannon and his band rediscovered the sound "in which his keen falsetto played off against airy organ obbligatos." In the 1980s, Shannon performed "competent but mundane country-rock".

Shannon had a resurgence of popularity after re-recording "Runaway" with new lyrics as the theme for the NBC-TV program Crime Story. In 1988, Shannon sang "The World We Know" with the Smithereens on their album Green Thoughts. Two years later, he recorded with Jeff Lynne of the Electric Light Orchestra, and rumors arose that he would join the Traveling Wilburys after the death of Roy Orbison. Previously, in 1975, Shannon had recorded tracks with Lynne, along with "In My Arms Again", a country song he wrote and recorded for Warner Bros. Records, which had signed Shannon in 1984.

== Death and legacy ==
In January 1990, Shannon was pushing himself to finish a new album and schedule upcoming concerts, resulting in troublesome stress. On the advice of his doctor, on January 24, Shannon began taking Prozac, an antidepressant. Fifteen days later, he died by suicide, shooting himself with a .22 caliber rifle at his home in Santa Clarita, California. "He was very much in charge of his business, but within days after he started taking Prozac, I noticed a personality change in him. He developed severe insomnia, extreme fatigue, chills, racing heart, dry mouth, and upset stomach," testified LeAnne Westover, Shannon's widow. "Suicide was totally out of character for my husband. There was no note and no goodbye."

Following his death, the Wilburys honored him by recording a version of "Runaway". Jeff Lynne also co-produced Shannon's posthumous album, Rock On, released by Silvertone Records in 1991.

Shannon was inducted into the Rock and Roll Hall of Fame in 1999 and into the Michigan Rock and Roll Legends Hall of Fame in 2005.

A Del Shannon Memorial Scholarship Fund was set up following Shannon's death. Coopersville, Michigan, holds an annual Del Shannon Car Show.

== Discography ==
- Runaway with Del Shannon (June 1961)
- Hats Off to Del Shannon (May 1963) – not issued in US. UK, New Zealand and Australia only
- Little Town Flirt (June 1963) (US number 12)
- Handy Man (October 1964)
- Del Shannon Sings Hank Williams (February 1965)
- 1,661 Seconds with Del Shannon (April 1965)
- This Is My Bag (July 1966)
- Total Commitment (October 1966)
- The Further Adventures of Charles Westover (March 1968)
- Live in England (June 1973)
- ...And the Music Plays On (1978)
- Drop Down and Get Me (October 1981) (US number 123)
- Rock On! (October 1991)
- Home and Away (recorded in 1967, released in 2006)
- The Dublin Sessions (recorded in 1977, released in July 2017)

== Literature ==
- Bak, Richard (July 2011). "Del Shannon's Runaway Success Led to his Downfall". Hour Detroit.
- DeWitt, Howard A. (2001). Stranger in Town: The Musical Life of Del Shannon. Dubuque, Iowa: Kendall/Hunt Publ. ISBN 978-0-7872-8854-9.
