= Otis! The Definitive Otis Redding =

Compilation album by Otis Redding
- Released: November 9, 1993
- Recorded: at Los Angeles, California, Macon, Georgia, Muscle Shoals, Alabama Stax Studios in Memphis, Tennessee, the Apollo Theater in New York City, the Whisky A Go Go in Los Angeles, California, the Monterey International Pop Festival, in Monterey, California and in Europe from 1960 to 1967.
- Genre: R&B/Soul
- Label: Rhino
- Producer: Bill Inglot, Steve Greenberg, Gary Stewart

Professional ratings
Review scores
Source	Rating
Allmusic	5/5 stars

Otis! The Definitive Otis Redding is a 1993 four compact disc compilation album by American soul singer-songwriter Otis Redding. The first three discs focus on studio material recorded for Stax records. These recordings are all original mono single or LP mixes. Three pre-Stax recordings and a demo recorded at Muscle Shoals are also included. The fourth disc, labeled "The Ultimate Live Otis Redding Show" was compiled from various live sources in an attempt to gather "the best version" of every song Otis ever recorded live and is mixed in stereo. The 100-page booklet includes testimonials from musicians and individuals from Redding's life, essays, a photo album, track listings, discographies, personnel and recording information.

This compilation received 5 stars on the 2004 "Rolling Stone Album Guide" and is cited as being the most complete collection of Redding's work.

== Track listing ==
Disc 1
No.	Title	Writer(s)	Length
1.	"She's All Right" (The Shooters featuring Otis)	Otis Redding/James McEachin	2:11
2.	"Gettin' Hip"	Otis Redding	2:13
3.	"Shout Bamalama" (Otis Redding & The Pinetoppers)	Otis Redding	1:58
4.	"Hey Hey Baby"	Otis Redding	2:46
5.	"These Arms Of Mine"	Otis Redding	2:33
6.	"That's What My Heart Needs"	Otis Redding	2:41
7.	"Mary's Little Lamb"	Otis Redding	2:39
8.	"Pain in My Heart"	Naomi Neville	2:24
9.	"Security"	Otis Redding	2:38
10.	"Come To Me"	Phil Walden/Otis Redding	2:48
11.	"Don't Leave Me This Way"	Phil Walden/Otis Redding	2:58
12.	"Little Ol' Me"	Otis Redding/Steve Cropper	3:15
13.	"Don't Be Afraid Of Love"	Oscar Mack/Phil Walden	3:26
14.	"Your One And Only Man"	Otis Redding	3:12
15.	"Chained And Bound"	Otis Redding	2:41
16.	"That's How Strong My Love Is"	Roosevelt Jamison	2:25
17.	"Mr. Pitiful"	Otis Redding/Steve Cropper	2:44
18.	"For Your Precious Love"	Arthur Brooks/Richard Brooks/Jerry Butler	2:54
19.	"I've Been Loving You Too Long (To Stop Now)"	Otis Redding/Jerry Butler	2:57
20.	"I'm Depending On You"	Otis Redding	2:31
21.	"Ole Man Trouble"	Otis Redding	2:38
22.	"Change Is Gonna Come"	Sam Cooke	4:16
23.	"Down in the Valley"	Solomon Burke/Bert Berns/Babe Chivian/Joseph Martin	3:00
24.	"Shake"	Sam Cooke	2:39

Disc 2
No.	Title	Writer(s)	Length
1.	"Respect"	Otis Redding	2:11
2.	"You Don't Miss Your Water"	William Bell	2:52
3.	"Satisfaction"	Mick Jagger/Keith Richards	2:47
4.	"I Can't Turn You Loose"	Otis Redding	2:46
5.	"Cupid"	Sam Cooke	3:10
6.	"Just One More Day"	Otis Redding/Steve Cropper/McElvoy Robinson	3:30
7.	"Good To Me"	Otis Redding/Julius Green	3:52
8.	"Cigarettes And Coffee"	Eddie Thomas/Jerry Butler/J. Walker	4:01
9.	"Chain Gang"	Sam Cooke/Charles Cooke	3:03
10.	"My Lover's Prayer"	Otis Redding	3:12
11.	"It's Growing"	William Robinson/Warren Moore	2:49
12.	"I'm Coming Home"	Otis Redding	3:11
13.	"Fa-Fa-Fa-Fa-Fa (Sad Song)"	Otis Redding/Steve Cropper	2:44
14.	"I'm Sick Y'all"	Otis Redding/Steve Cropper/David Porter	2:57
15.	"Sweet Lorene"	Otis Redding/Isaac Hayes/Alvertis Isbell	2:30
16.	"Try A Little Tenderness"	Jimmy Campbell/Reg Connelly/Harry Woods	3:50
17.	"Day Tripper"	John Lennon/Paul McCartney	2:36
18.	"Tramp" (Otis & Carla)	Lowell Fulson/Jimmy McCracklin	3:03
19.	"Knock on Wood" (Otis & Carla)	Steve Cropper/Eddie Floyd	2:52
20.	"Lovey Dovey" (Otis & Carla)	Memphis Curtis/Ahmet Ertegün	2:37
21.	"New Year's Resolution" (Otis & Carla)	Willia Parker/Randle Catron/Mary Frierson	3:19
22.	"You Left the Water Running"	Dan Penn/Rick Hall/Oscar Franks	2:43
23.	"Trick Or Treat"	Isaac Hayes/David Porter	3:15
24.	"Merry Christmas, Baby"	Lou Baxter/Johnny Moore	2:30
25.	"White Christmas"	Irving Berlin	3:09
26.	"Things Go Better With Coke (A Man and a Woman)"	Unknown	1:30

Disc 3
No.	Title	Writer(s)	Length
1.	"Announcement (from Stay in School)"	Otis Redding	1:15
2.	"Glory Of Love"	Billy Hill	2:53
3.	"I Love You More Than Words Can Say"	Eddie Floyd/Booker T. Jones	2:55
4.	"Let Me Come On Home"	Otis Redding/Booker T. Jones/Al Jackson Jr.	2:56
5.	"Open The Door"	Otis Redding	2:26
6.	"Hucklebuck"	Roy Alfred/Andy Gibson	3:01
7.	"The Happy Song (Dum-Dum)"	Otis Redding/Steve Cropper	2:42
8.	"Hard to Handle"	Allen Jones/Alvertis Isbell/Otis Redding	2:21
9.	"Amen"	traditional, arr. Otis Redding	2:06
10.	"Gone Again"	Otis Redding/Joe Rock	2:25
11.	"I've Got Dreams To Remember"	Zelma Redding/Otis Redding/Joe Rock	3:16
12.	"I'm A Changed Man"	Steve Cropper/Otis Redding	2:23
13.	"Direct Me"	Steve Cropper/Otis Redding	2:20
14.	"Love Man"	Otis Redding	2:19
15.	"Free Me"	Otis Redding/Gene Lawson	3:08
16.	"Look at the Girl"	Otis Redding	2:40
17.	"Pounds And Hundreds (Lbs + 100s)"	Otis Redding/Steve Cropper	2:26
18.	"Tell The Truth"	Lowman Pauling	3:14
19.	"Johnny's Heartbreak"	Otis Redding/Arthur Alexander	2:36
20.	"The Match Game"	Otis Redding/David Porter	2:55
21.	"A Little Time"	Otis Redding	2:31
22.	"Slippin' and Slidin'"	Richard Penniman/Edwin Bocage/James Smith/Albert Collins	1:58
23.	"(Sittin' On) The Dock of the Bay"	Steve Cropper/Otis Redding	2:41

Disc 4 "The Ultimate Live Otis Redding Show"
No.	Title	Writer(s)	Length
1.	"Introduction" (by Emperor Rosko)		0:37
2.	"Shake"	Sam Cooke	2:34
3.	"Pain in My Heart"	Naomi Neville	2:19
4.	"These Arms Of Mine"	Otis Redding	2:32
5.	"Can't Turn You Loose"	Otis Redding	3:28
6.	"I've Been Loving You Too Long (To Stop Now)"	Otis Redding/Jerry Butler	4:08
7.	"My Girl"	William Robinson/Ronald White	2:43
8.	"Your One And Only Man"	Otis Redding	3:23
9.	"Good To Me"	Otis Redding/Julius Green	3:57
10.	"Day Tripper"	John Lennon/Paul McCartney	3:12
11.	"Just One More Day"	Otis Redding/Steve Cropper/McElvoy Robinson	5:25
12.	"Mr. Pitiful"	Otis Redding/Steve Cropper	2:07
13.	"Satisfaction"	Mick Jagger/Keith Richards	2:57
14.	"I'm Depending On You"	Otis Redding	3:22
15.	"Fa-Fa-Fa-Fa-Fa (Sad Song)"	Otis Redding/Steve Cropper	4:09
16.	"Chained And Bound"	Otis Redding	7:39
17.	"Ol' Man Trouble"	Otis Redding	2:38
18.	"Any Ole Way"	Otis Redding/Steve Cropper	2:39
19.	"Papa's Got a Brand New Bag"	James Brown	4:58
20.	"Security"	Otis Redding	2:32
21.	"A Hard Day's Night"	John Lennon/Paul McCartney	2:08
22.	"Respect"	Otis Redding	3:06
23.	"Try A Little Tenderness"	Harry Woods/Jimmy Campbell/Reg Connelly	5:15

  - tracks 3 & 4 recorded live at the Apollo Theater in New York, November 16, 1963
  - tracks 8, 9, 11, 12, 14 & 16–21 recorded live at the Whisky A Go Go in Los Angeles, April 8–10, 1966
  - tracks 1, 2, 5–7, 10, 13 & 15 recorded live in London or Paris, March 1967
  - tracks 22 & 23 recorded live at the Monterey Pop Festival, June 17, 1967

== Personnel ==
=== Studio Personnel ===
- Otis Redding – vocals, guitar
- Steve Cropper – guitar, occasional piano, bass
- Booker T. Jones – organ, piano, occasional guitar
- Isaac Hayes – piano, organ
- Lewis Steinberg – bass
- Donald "Duck" Dunn – bass
- Al Jackson Jr. – drums
- Wayne Jackson – trumpet
- Sammie Coleman – trumpet
- Gene "Bowlegs" Miller – trumpet
- Charles "Packy" Axton – tenor sax
- Andrew Love – tenor sax
- Gilbert Caples – tenor sax
- Joe Arnold – tenor sax
- Floyd Newman – baritone sax
- Wayne Cochran – bass
- Johnny Jenkins – guitar
- The Veltones – backing vocals
- The Drapels – backing vocals
- William Bell – backing vocal
- Gene Parker – tenor sax
- David Porter – backing vocal
- Carla Thomas – duet vocal (disc 2, tracks 18–21)
- Rick Hall – drumming
- Phil Walden – tambourine
- Ron Capone – drums
- Ben Cauley – trumpet
- Tommie Lee Williams – tenor sax

=== Live Personnel ===
==== Apollo Theater ====
- James Albert Bethea, Cornell Dupree & Thomas Palmer – guitar
- George Stubbs – piano
- Alonzo Collins & Jimmy Lewis – bass
- Ray Lucas – drums
- Elmon Wright & Lamar Wright – trumpet
- George Matthews – trombone
- Jimmy Powell – alto sax
- King Curtis, Alva "Beau" McCain & Noble Watts – tenor sax
- Paul Williams – baritone sax

==== Whisky A Go Go ====
- James Young – guitar
- Ralph Stewart – bass
- Elbert Woodson – drums
- Sammie Coleman & John Farris – trumpets
- Clarence Johnson Jr. – trombone
- Donald Henry, Robert Holloway, Robert Pittman & (possibly) Albrisco Clark – saxes

==== Europe and Monterey ====
- Steve Cropper – guitar
- Booker T. Jones – keyboards
- Donald "Duck" Dunn – bass
- Al Jackson Jr. – drums
- Wayne Jackson – trumpet
- Andrew Love & Joe Arnold – tenor sax
