= Respect (song) =

1965 single by Otis Redding

Single by Otis Redding

from the album Otis Blue/Otis Redding Sings Soul
- B-side: "Ole Man Trouble"
- Released: August 1965
- Recorded: 1965
- Genre: Soul
- Length: 2:05
- Label: Volt
- Songwriter: Otis Redding
- Producer: Steve Cropper

Otis Redding singles chronology
"I've Been Loving You Too Long" (1965)	"Respect" (1965)	"Just One More Day" (1965)

Official music audio
- "Respect" on YouTube

"Respect" is a song by American soul singer-songwriter Otis Redding, originally recorded and released by himself in 1965 as a single from his third album Otis Blue/Otis Redding Sings Soul. After it became a crossover hit for Redding, Aretha Franklin (the "Queen of Soul") in 1967 rearranged, rephrased, and covered it, resulting in her breakout hit and her signature song.

The music in the two versions is significantly different, while a few changes in the lyrics resulted in different narratives around the theme of human dignity that have been interpreted as commentaries on gender roles, relationships, and "respect".

Franklin's interpretation became a feminist anthem for the second-wave feminism movement in the 1970s. It has often been considered one of the best rhythm and blues songs of its era, earning Franklin two Grammy Awards in 1968 for "Best Rhythm and Blues Recording" and "Best Rhythm and Blues Solo Vocal Performance, Female", and being inducted in the Grammy Hall of Fame in 1987. In 2002, the Library of Congress honored Franklin's version by adding it to the National Recording Registry. It was placed number five on the 2004 version of Rolling Stone's list of the 500 Greatest Songs of All Time, number one on the 2021 version of the list, and number four on its list of the 100 Best Protest Songs of All Time. It was also included in the list of Songs of the Century, by the Recording Industry of America and the National Endowment for the Arts.

== Otis Redding original ==
=== Writing and recording ===
At first a ballad, "Respect" was brought to Redding by Earl "Speedo" Sims, who intended to record it with his band, the Singing Demons. Differing accounts exist as to who wrote the original version of the song. Bandleader Percy Welch said the writer was a guitarist at Bobby Smith's recording studio in Macon. Redding took Sims' version, rewrote the lyrics, and sped up the tempo. Sims went with the band to the Muscle Shoals studios, but was unable to produce a good version. Redding then decided to sing the song himself, to which Sims agreed. Redding also promised to credit Sims, but this never happened. Sims never pressed Redding on the issue, possibly because he himself had not really written it in the first place. Steve Cropper produced the session.

=== Analysis ===
According to Redding biographer Jonathan Gould, "the lyrics to 'Respect' paint a starkly unromantic picture of domestic relations", revolving around a "little girl" who is "sweeter than honey" and a man who will reward her with "all [his] money". This relationship dynamic is underscored musically by a near-comically persistent groove and "celebratory blaring of the horns, which seem to be heralding a carnal reunion of epic proportions". Redding's vocals are similarly aggressive, marked by "phrasing in staccato bursts" in delivering the verses – "What you want / Honey you got it / You can do me wrong honey / While I'm gone / All I'm asking is for a little respect when I come home" – accompanied by backing male vocals in the manner of a Greek chorus adding the refrain "Hey, hey hey!" In Gould's analysis, it has "an apparent modesty of [the song's] expectations: the way it takes a word that commonly refers to personal esteem and scales it down to serve as a euphemism for sexual reward", referring to "the 'street' meaning of 'respect', bound up with issues of deference and power." "But only up to a point", as Gould concludes of the song's finale:

In the coda that follows the final verse, Otis goes to work, wresting the word free of this narrow meaning, asserting his prerogative with an insistent determination that turns the song in its final moments into a plea for simple human dignity – "Respect is what I want! / Respect is what I need! / I got-ta got-ta have it! / Just give me some respect!" – that doesn't stop at mere discretion.

According to Franklin biographer Matt Dobkin, "Redding's version is characteristically funky, with his raspy-soulful singing and electric vocal charisma front and center", using "playful horns and sexy, mock-beleaguered vocals". According to NPR, Redding's version "reinforced the traditional family structure of the time: Man works all day, brings money home to wife and demands her respect in return."

=== Release ===
The song was included on Redding's third studio album, Otis Blue (1965). The album became widely successful, even outside of his largely rhythm and blues (R&B) and blues fan base. When released in the summer of 1965, the song reached the top five on Billboard's Black Singles Chart, and crossed over to pop radio's white audience, peaking at number 35 there. At the time, the song became Redding's second-largest crossover hit (after "I've Been Loving You Too Long") and paved the way to future presence on American radio. Redding performed it at the Monterey Pop Festival.

Cash Box described it as a "rollicking, rhythmic poundin' romancer about a fella who wants his sweetheart to treat him with 'Respect' when he comes home."

== Aretha Franklin version ==
"Respect"

Single by Aretha Franklin

from the album I Never Loved a Man the Way I Love You
- B-side: "Dr. Feelgood"
- Released: April 10, 1967
- Recorded: February 14, 1967
- Studio: Atlantic, New York City
- Genre: Soul; R&B
- Length: 2:29
- Label: Atlantic
- Songwriter: Otis Redding
- Producer: Jerry Wexler

Aretha Franklin singles chronology
"I Never Loved a Man (The Way I Love You)" (1967)	"Respect" (1967)	"Baby I Love You" (1967)

=== Recording ===
Producer Jerry Wexler booked Franklin for a series of recording dates in January–February 1967, starting with "I Never Loved a Man (The Way I Love You)", recorded in Alabama at FAME Studios by engineer Tom Dowd. After an altercation between the studio owner and Franklin's husband and manager, Ted White, the sessions continued 10 days later in New York without White, recording "Do Right Woman, Do Right Man", using the same engineer and musicians, the Muscle Shoals Rhythm Section, affectionately known as the "Swampers", as in Alabama.

During the following week, they recorded "Respect", which Franklin had been performing in her live shows for several years. Her version of the song flipped the gender of the lyrics, as worked out by Franklin with her sisters, Erma and Carolyn. Franklin instructed the rhythm section on how to perform her established arrangement of the "stop-and-stutter" syncopation, and in the studio, she worked out new parts for the backing singers. "Respect" was recorded on Valentine's Day, February 14, 1967.

For the song's bridge, King Curtis' tenor saxophone soloed over the chords from Sam & Dave's song "When Something Is Wrong with My Baby". Franklin played piano for the number; in an interview, Spooner Oldham explained that not uncommonly did Franklin herself to play accompanying piano. The overall arrangement was by co-producer Arif Mardin, based on the ideas Franklin brought in. Said Mardin: "I have been in many studios in my life, but there was never a day like that. It was like a festival. Everything worked just right."

=== Analysis and subtext ===
"Respect"
Aretha Franklin version of Otis Redding's "Respect" from I Never Loved a Man the Way I Love You

According to Dobkin, Franklin's version was refashioned as a declaration from a strong, confident woman, who believes she has everything her man wants and does not wrong him, while demanding his "respect" – in the form of appropriate levels of physical attention. The repeated "sock it to me" line, sung by Franklin's sisters, was an idea that Carolyn and Aretha had worked out together; spelling out "R-E-S-P-E-C-T" was (according to engineer Tom Dowd) Carolyn's idea. The phrase "sock it to me" became a household expression. In an interview with WHYY's Fresh Air in 1999, Aretha said, "Some of the girls were saying that to the fellas, like 'sock it to me' in this way or 'sock it to me' in that way. It's not sexual. It was nonsexual, just a cliché line."

Franklin's version of the song contains the famous lines (as printed in the lyrics included in the 1985 compilation album Atlantic Soul Classics):

R-E-S-P-E-C-T
Find out what it means to me
R-E-S-P-E-C-T
Take care of... TCB

"TCB" is an abbreviation, commonly used in the 1960s and 1970s, meaning "taking care of business", African-American slang for pleasing one's partner. "TCB in a flash" later became Elvis Presley's motto and signature. "R-E-S-P-E-C-T" and "TCB" are not present in Redding's 1965 version, but he incorporated Franklin's ideas in his later performances with the Bar-Kays.

According to Detroit Free Press critic Brian McCollum, "Franklin's song has been dissected in books and academic papers, held up as a groundbreaking feminist and civil-rights statement in an era when such declarations weren't always easy to make." When asked about her audacious stance amidst the feminist and civil-rights movement, Franklin told the Detroit Free Press, "I don't think it's bold at all. I think it's quite natural that we all want respect—and should get it."

=== Release and legacy ===
The resulting song was featured on Franklin's 1967 breakthrough Atlantic Records debut album, I Never Loved a Man the Way I Love You. As the title track became a hit on both R&B and pop radio, Atlantic Records arranged for the release of this new version of "Respect" as a single. It was released on April 10, 1967. Cash Box called the single a "frantic, driving, wailing, up-beat workout."

According to NPR, "So much of what made 'Respect' a hit—and an anthem—came from the Franklin rearrangement (including the Muscle Shoals musician's soulful guitar hook, the background vocals, and the added sax solo/chords). Franklin's rendition found greater success than the original, spending two weeks atop the Billboard Pop Singles chart, and eight weeks on the Billboard Black Singles chart. The changes in lyrics and production drove Franklin's version to become an anthem for the increasingly large Civil Rights and Women's Rights movements. She altered the lyrics to represent herself, a strong woman demanding respect from her man. Franklin's demands for "Respect" were "associated either with black freedom struggles or women's liberation."

The song also became a hit internationally, reaching number 10 in the United Kingdom, and helped to transform Franklin from a domestic star into an international one. Otis Redding himself was impressed with the performance of the song. At the Monterey Pop Festival in the summer of the cover's release, he was quoted as playfully describing "Respect" as the song "that a girl took away from me, a friend of mine, this girl she just took this song". "When her hit single 'Respect' climbed the charts in July 1967, some fans declared that the summer of 1967 was 'the summer of 'Retha, Rap, and Revolt.'"

"Respect" has appeared in dozens of films and still receives consistent play on radio stations. In the 1970s, Franklin's version of the song came to exemplify the feminist movement. Producer Wexler said in a Rolling Stone interview, that Franklin's song was "global in its influence, with overtones of the civil-rights movement and gender equality. It was an appeal for dignity." Although she had numerous hits after "Respect", and several before its release, the song became Franklin's signature song and her best-known recording. I Never Loved a Man the Way I Love You was ranked eighty-third in Rolling Stone's "500 Greatest Albums of All Time" in 2003. A year later, "Respect" was fifth in the magazine's "500 Greatest Songs of All Time".

In 2021, when the 500 Greatest Songs Of All Time was updated again, Franklin's cover of "Respect" was moved up to number one. Bob Dylan's song "Like a Rolling Stone", which was originally at number one, is now listed at number four. In 2025, the publication ranked Franklin's cover at number four on its list of the 100 Best Protest Songs of All Time. In June 2026, CBS News included the song in its list of the 250 essential American songs of the past 250 years.

== Personnel ==
- Written by Otis Redding

=== Otis Redding version ===
Musicians

- Otis Redding – lead vocals
- Booker T. Jones or Isaac Hayes – keyboards
- Steve Cropper – guitar
- Donald Dunn – bass guitar
- Al Jackson Jr. – drums
- Wayne Jackson – trumpet
- Gene "Bowlegs" Miller – trumpet
- Andrew Love – tenor saxophone
- Floyd Newman – baritone saxophone
- William Bell – backing vocals
- Earl Sims – backing vocals

Additional personnel

- Steve Cropper – producer
- Tom Dowd – engineer

=== Aretha Franklin version ===
Musicians

- Aretha Franklin – lead vocals, piano
- Spooner Oldham – Hammond organ
- Chips Moman, Jimmy Johnson – guitar
- Tommy Cogbill – bass guitar
- Roger Hawkins – drums
- King Curtis – tenor saxophone
- Charles Chalmers – tenor saxophone
- Willie Bridges – baritone saxophone
- Melvin Lastie – cornet
- Carolyn Franklin – background vocals
- Erma Franklin – background vocals

Additional personnel

- Jerry Wexler and Arif Mardin – producers
- Tom Dowd – engineer
- Arif Mardin – arranger

== Chart history ==
=== Otis Redding version ===
Chart (1965)	Peak position
US Billboard Hot 100	35
US Hot Rhythm & Blues Singles (Billboard)	4

=== Aretha Franklin version ===
Chart (1967)	Peak position
Australia (Kent Music Report)	14
Austria (Ö3 Austria Top 40)	17
Belgium (Ultratop 50 Wallonia)	18
Canada Top Singles (RPM)	3
Italy (FIMI)	26
Netherlands (Single Top 100)	7
Scottish Singles Sales (Official Charts)	19
UK Singles (Official Charts)	10
US Billboard Hot 100	1
US Hot Rhythm & Blues Singles (Billboard)	1
West Germany (GfK)	23

Chart (2018)	Peak position
Ireland (IRMA)	75
Sweden Heatseeker (Sverigetopplistan)	1

== Certifications and sales ==
=== Aretha Franklin version ===
Region	Certification	Certified units/sales
Denmark (IFPI Danmark)	Gold	45,000^{‡}
France (SNEP)	Platinum	200,000^{‡}
Germany (BVMI)	Gold	300,000^{‡}
Italy (FIMI)	Platinum	100,000^{‡}
New Zealand (RMNZ)	2× Platinum	60,000^{‡}
Spain (Promusicae)	Platinum	60,000^{‡}
United Kingdom (BPI)	2× Platinum	1,200,000^{‡}
United States (RIAA)	Gold	1,000,000^{^}
^{^} Shipments figures based on certification alone.^{‡} Sales+streaming figures based on certification alone.

== Other covers ==
Because Franklin made "Respect" a hit, many who sample or cover the song refer to her version rather than Redding's. The Supremes and the Temptations were the two most successful acts signed to Berry Gordy Jr.'s Motown record label. Gordy decided to pair them up on a collaborative LP titled Diana Ross & the Supremes Join The Temptations. To accompany the release of the LP, Gordy organized a prime-time special TV program entitled TCB, a commonly used abbreviation for "Taking Care of Business". Among the songs performed on the program was a cover of Aretha Franklin's version of "Respect". The two groups took Franklin's message to new heights as the male versus female duet illustrated a battle in which each gender demanded their own respect. Additionally, the cover highlights the Supremes' own battle for racial equality. Much like Aretha Franklin, the Supremes' rise to fame coincided with the civil rights movement, in which these women used their fame and status to assist the fight for racial equality. The Supremes were the Motown group which most successfully broke down racial boundaries within the popular music industry. They represented racial integration, black empowerment, and black womanhood, and their cover of "Respect" with the Temptations illustrates that.

Stevie Wonder also covered the song on his 1967 album I Was Made to Love Her.

Rotary Connection covered it on their 1969 album Songs.

Other covers of the song include The Rationals', whose version predated Franklin's and reached No. 92 on the Billboard Hot 100 in 1966, and Reba McEntire's 1988 recording for her self-titled album Reba. McEntire also performed the song at the CMA Awards the same year. A house music cover version with altered lyrics was released by American R&B singer Adeva in 1989, reaching No. 17 on the UK Singles Chart and was featured on her debut album. In 2012, Melanie Amaro recorded an uptempo version of the song for a Pepsi commercial alongside Elton John as a part of her prize for winning the first season of The X Factor. The single peaked at #3 on Billboard's Dance Club Songs chart and was #42 for the chart's year-end list in 2012.
