= Floyd Newman =

American musician (1931–2023)

Floyd Newman (August 17, 1931 – May 23, 2023) was an American saxophonist, session musician and bandleader. As a baritone sax player, he was long associated with Stax Records, and as a member of The Mar-Keys’ horn section and the Memphis Horns.

Born in Memphis, in the late 1940s he became a member of the B.B. King Review, with, among others, George Coleman and George Joyner. Newman later moved to Detroit and recorded with Jackie Brenston, and toured with Sam Cooke before returning to Memphis. Newman also led a band featuring Howard Grimes on drums, Joe Woods on guitar and Isaac Hayes on keyboards, and which performed at the Plantation Inn. This line-up also recorded a 45, “Frog Stomp” (1963), co-written by Newman and Hayes. Newman and Hayes had previously coincided in Ben Branch’s house band at the Tropicana Club, with Hayes as a vocalist. The song's title inspired Daniel Johns from Australian rock band Silverchair to co-opt the title for their debut album, Frogstomp, after seeing it among manager John Watson's record collection.

As a member of the House horn section at Stax, in 1965 he went on to become a founding member of the Memphis Horns, with Wayne Jackson and Gene "Bowlegs" Miller on trumpets, and Andrew Love on tenor saxophone.

Newman died on May 23, 2023, at the age of 91.

== Discography ==
As leader/co-leader

- 1963: "Frog Stomp" / "Sassy" (Stax)

As sideman

- 1964: Pain in My Heart – Otis Redding
- 1965: Boss of the Blues – B. B. King
- 1965: The Great Otis Redding Sings Soul Ballads – Otis Redding
- 1965: Otis Blue/Otis Redding Sings Soul – Otis Redding
- 1965: In the Midnight Hour – Wilson Pickett
- 1966: The Exciting Wilson Pickett – Wilson Pickett
- 1966: Complete & Unbelievable: The Otis Redding Dictionary of Soul – Otis Redding
- 1966: The Soul Album – Otis Redding
- 1967: The Sound of Wilson Pickett – Wilson Pickett
- 1967: The Wicked Pickett – Wilson Pickett
- 1968: Tell Mama – Etta James
- 1968: I'm in Love – Wilson Pickett
- 1968: This Is Clarence Carter – Clarence Carter
- 1968: The Dock of the Bay – Otis Redding
- 1968: Aretha Now – Aretha Franklin
- 1969: Boz Scaggs – Boz Scaggs
- 1970: Melody Fair – Lulu
- 1970: To Bonnie from Delaney – Delaney & Bonnie
- 1971: Stephen Stills 2 – Stephen Stills
- 1973: Hey Now Hey (The Other Side of the Sky) – Aretha Franklin
