= I've Been Loving You Too Long =

1965 single by Otis Redding

Single by Otis Redding

from the album Otis Blue/Otis Redding Sings Soul
- B-side: "I'm Depending on You"
- Released: April 19, 1965
- Recorded: April 1965 (Note: The original version was recorded in mono in April 1965. A stereo version for inclusion on Otis Blue was recorded July 9–10.)
- Genre: Soul
- Length: 2:49
- Label: Volt (V-126)
- Songwriters: Otis Redding, Jerry Butler
- Producer: Steve Cropper

Otis Redding singles chronology
| "Mr. Pitiful" (1965) | "I've Been Loving You Too Long" (1965) | "Respect" (1965) |

"I've Been Loving You Too Long" (originally "I've Been Loving You Too Long (To Stop Now)") is a soul music ballad written by Otis Redding and Jerry Butler. Considered by music critics and writers to be one of Redding's finest performances and a soul classic, it is a slow, emotional piece with Redding's pleading vocals backed by producer Steve Cropper's arpeggiated guitar parts and a horn section.

Redding recorded the song in 1965 and when released as a single in April 1965, became his second best selling single. The song was subsequently included on his third album, Otis Blue: Otis Redding Sings Soul (1965). The song reached number 21 on the Billboard Hot 100 and number 2 on the Billboard Rhythm & Blues chart. Billboard described it as a "winning tender and soulful piece of material and performance by 'Mr. Pitiful' himself." Cash Box described it as "a tender, slow-moving heartfelt lament about a fella whose love for his gal is growing cold."

Notable cover versions include performances by the Rolling Stones, Aretha Franklin, Etta James, Ike & Tina Turner, and a country music version by Barbara Mandrell—her first single. In Australia, Diesel charted with a cover version in 1993. The song was added to the United States National Recording Registry in 2003. In 2011, the 1965 recording by Redding on Volt Records was inducted into the Grammy Hall of Fame.

== Background and composition ==
Songs by Redding appeared in the U.S. Billboard pop and R&B charts as early as 1962, but "I've Been Loving You Too Long" became his biggest hit upon its release.

Although the tempo is exactly the same, two versions of the song have been recorded in 1965; one lasts 2'50 and the second one is 3'10 long (in the original LP version), i.e., with an extra verse. Booker T. Jones plays piano on one version while Isaac Hayes is on the other.

== Recording and personnel ==
- Otis Redding – vocals
- Booker T. Jones – keyboards, piano
- Isaac Hayes – keyboards, piano
- Steve Cropper – guitar
- Donald Dunn – bass guitar
- Al Jackson Jr. – drums
- Wayne Jackson – trumpet
- Gene Miller – trumpet
- Andrew Love – tenor saxophone
- Floyd Newman – baritone saxophone

== Ike & Tina Turner version ==
"I've Been Loving You Too Long"

Single by Ike & Tina Turner

from the album Outta Season
- B-side: "Grumbling"
- Released: April 1969
- Genre: Soul, R&B
- Length: 3:40
- Label: Blue Thumb
- Songwriters: Otis Redding, Jerry Butler
- Producers: Bob Krasnow, Tina Turner

Ike & Tina Turner singles chronology
| "I'm Gonna Do All I Can (To Do Right by My Man)" (1969) | "I've Been Loving You Too Long" (1969) | "I Wish It Would Rain" (1969) |

Ike & Tina Turner recorded the song for their 1969 album, Outta Season. Produced by Tina Turner and Bob Krasnow, the single peaked at number 23 on the Billboard R&B chart and number 68 on the Billboard Hot 100. It was reissued in 1971, reaching number 56 on the Cash Box R&B chart and number 44 on Record World's R&B chart.

=== Live performances ===
The Turners can be seen performing the song at Madison Square Garden in the Rolling Stones concert film Gimme Shelter (1970). Their version differs from the original because they added an additional section with an explicit interaction. During their live performances they simulated oral sex. Tina caressed the microphone and moaned while Ike made suggestive slurping noises. Prior to Tina, a former member of the Kings of Rhythm named Jimmy Thomas would perform that song. In her autobiography I, Tina, she said:

Then when Jimmy left, I started singing the song, because it was a very good show song, and I started mimicking Jimmy, but putting my own female thing into it. I was really involved with that song in the beginning. Then I became bored with it, but Ike wouldn't let me stop. He started making those noises in the background, and it became really pornographic. Embarrassing. But the people loved it.

=== Track listing ===
1969
| No. | Title | Writer(s) | Length |
|---|---|---|---|
| 1. | "I’ve Been Loving You Too Long" | Jerry Butler, Otis Redding | 3:40 |
| 2. | "Grumbling" | Ike Turner | 2:35 |

1971
| No. | Title | Writer(s) | Length |
|---|---|---|---|
| 1. | "I've Been Loving You Too Long" | Jerry Butler, Otis Redding | 3:40 |
| 2. | "Crazy 'Bout You Baby" | Sonny Boy Williamson | 3:45 |

== Diesel version ==
"I've Been Loving You Too Long"

Single by Diesel

from the album The Lobbyist
- B-side: "Come to Me"
- Released: 29 November 1993
- Label: EMI
- Songwriters: Otis Redding, Jerry Butler
- Producers: Diesel, Don Gehman

Diesel singles chronology
| "Masterplan" (1993) | "I've Been Loving You Too Long" (1993) | "Still Got a Long Way to Go" (1994) |

In 1992, Australian musician Diesel recorded the song for his third studio album, The Lobbyist (1993). It was released as the third and final single and peaked at number 41 on the Australian ARIA Singles Chart on 29 November 1993.

=== Track listing ===
1. "I've Been Loving You Too Long"
2. "Come to Me" (UK remix)

== Other versions ==
- The first cover of the song was a recording by the Rolling Stones in 1965, shortly after Redding's original version became a hit. It was included on the Stones' first live album, Got Live If You Want It! (1966), although the track was a studio recording that had been overdubbed with audience noises. Returning the compliment, Redding covered the Rolling Stones song "(I Can't Get No) Satisfaction", written by Mick Jagger and Keith Richards.
- Aretha Franklin covered the song on her 1972 album Young, Gifted And Black.

== Chart performance ==
Otis Redding
| Chart (1965) | Peak Position |
|---|---|
| US Billboard Hot 100 | 21 |
| US Billboard R&B | 2 |

Ike & Tina Turner
| Chart | Year | Peak Position |
|---|---|---|
| US Billboard Hot 100 | 1969 | 68 |
| US Billboard R&B | 1969 | 23 |
| US Cash Box Top 100 | 1969 | 91 |
| US Record World Top 100 | 1969 | 94 |
| US Bubbling Under Hot 100 | 1971 | 120 |
| US Cash Box R&B | 1971 | 56 |
| US Record World R&B | 1971 | 44 |

Diesel
| Chart (1993) | Peak Position |
|---|---|
| Australia (ARIA) | 41 |
