= Gene "Bowlegs" Miller =

American trumpeter and band leader (1933-1987)

Gene "Bowlegs" Miller (May 27, 1933 – December 25, 1987) was an American trumpeter and band leader.

== Biography ==
Miller performed in clubs on Beale Street, in Memphis, Tennessee, when that area was a flourishing center of nightlife, playing with such entertainers as Gatemouth Moore, Maurice Hulbert, Jr., and Ma Rainey. He played with bandleaders Tuff Green and Phineas Newborn, Sr.

Miller formed his own band, Bowlegs & His Band, in the early 1960s, playing regularly at Memphis clubs, including the Flamingo Room, Club Handy, and Currie's Club Tropicana and, later, the Rosewood, Club Paradise, and the Manhattan Club.

He directed, arranged, written, produced and played with many leading entertainers, such as Otis Redding, O. V. Wright, Little Jr. Parker, Aretha Franklin, Lou Rawls, Joe Simon, Isaac Hayes, Wilson Pickett, Jerry Butler, B.B. King, Bobby "Blue" Bland, Al Green, Denise LaSalle, Nancy Wilson, Rufus Thomas, Sam & Dave, Onzie Horne, Etta James, Ollie Nightingale, Johnny Nash, James Carr, and Willie Mitchell.

He promoted Sugar Hill Gang and LL Cool J. Also, he entertained many jazz audiences with entertainers such as Julian "Cannonball" and Nat Adderley, Dizzy Gillespie, Nina Simone, Phineas Newborn, Jr., and many others.

Miller was the orchestral leader for WDIA Radio Station Starlight and Goodwill Revues. He also worked as the southern independent record promoter for Island, Atlantic, Arista, and CBS Records of New York. He recorded at Sun Studio, Mercury Studio, Malaco Records, Home of the Blues and Muscle Shoals. He was a regular session player at Fame Studios playing on such hits as “Tell Mama” by Etta James, "Slip Away" by Clarence Carter, “Hey Jude” by Wilson Pickett.

Miller was a native Memphian and graduate of Booker T. Washington High School.

Miller married his wife Frances Miller Harris in 1956 and they had one son together. He died on December 25, 1987 in Memphis, Tennessee at the age of 54. His wife lived in Memphis, Tennessee then moved to Carson, California where she died on November 22, 2020.

He was honored by the Beale Street Brass Note Walk of Fame in 2011.

== Discography ==
As sideman

- 1965: Otis Blue/Otis Redding Sings Soul, Otis Redding
- 1966: The Soul Album, Otis Redding
- 1966: The Exciting Wilson Pickett, Wilson Pickett
- 1966: Complete & Unbelievable: The Otis Redding Dictionary of Soul, Otis Redding
- 1967: The Sound of Wilson Pickett, Wilson Pickett
- 1967: The Wicked Pickett, Wilson Pickett
- 1967: Chuck Berry in Memphis, Chuck Berry
- 1968: The Dock of the Bay, Otis Redding
- 1968: I'm in Love, Wilson Pickett
- 1968: This Is Clarence Carter, Clarence Carter
- 1968: Tell Mama, Etta James
- 1969: Hey Jude, Wilson Pickett
- 1969: Boz Scaggs, Boz Scaggs
- 1970: Do the Funky Chicken, Rufus Thomas
- 1971: The Brand New Z. Z. Hill, Z. Z. Hill
