= The Dock of the Bay (album) =

Compilation album by Otis Redding
- Released: February 23, 1968
- Recorded: July 11, 1965 – December 8, 1967
- Genres: Memphis soul; Southern soul
- Length: 30:07
- Labels: Volt; Atco
- Producer: Steve Cropper

Otis Redding chronology
Live in Europe (1967)	The Dock of the Bay (1968)	The Immortal Otis Redding (1968)

Professional ratings
Review scores
Source	Rating
AllMusic	5/5 stars
Rolling Stone	(Positive)
Tom Hull – on the Web	A−

The Dock of the Bay is the first of a number of posthumously released Otis Redding albums, and his seventh studio album. It contains a number of singles, B-sides, and previously released album tracks dating back to 1965, including one of his best known songs, the posthumous hit "(Sittin' On) The Dock of the Bay". His final recordings were finished just two days before Redding's death in a plane crash on December 10, 1967. In 2003, the album was ranked number 161 on Rolling Stone magazine's list of the 500 greatest albums of all time, maintaining the rating in a 2012 revised list.

== Track listing ==
Side one
No.	Title	Writer(s)	Length
1.	"(Sittin' On) The Dock of the Bay"	Steve Cropper, Otis Redding	2:38
2.	"I Love You More Than Words Can Say"	Eddie Floyd, Booker T. Jones	2:50
3.	"Let Me Come on Home"	Jones, Redding	2:53
4.	"Open the Door"	Redding	2:21
5.	"Don't Mess with Cupid"	Cropper, Floyd, Deanie Parker	2:28

Side two
No.	Title	Writer(s)	Length
1.	"The Glory of Love"	Billy Hill	2:38
2.	"I'm Coming Home To See About You"	Redding	3:03
3.	"Tramp" (with Carla Thomas)	Lowell Fulson, Jimmy McCracklin	2:32
4.	"The Huckle-Buck"	Roy Alfred, Andy Gibson	2:58
5.	"Nobody Knows You (When You're Down and Out)"	Jimmy Cox	3:10
6.	"Ole Man Trouble"	Redding	2:36

=== Notes ===
- Tracks 1 & 5–7 were released on singles.
- Track 7 was titled "I'm Coming Home" on the original album, but later "I'm Coming Home To See About You" (e.g. on the 2008 reissue), possibly to prevent confusion with a different song, also called "I'm Coming Home", first issued on the posthumous compilation album Remember Me and later included in the compilation box set Otis! The Definitive Otis Redding.
- Tracks 2–4 & 9 are unreleased.
- Track 8 is from King & Queen (1967).
- Track 10 is from The Soul Album (1966).
- Track 11 is from Otis Blue (1965).

== Personnel ==
- Otis Redding – vocals
- Booker T. Jones – keyboards, piano
- Isaac Hayes – keyboards, piano
- Steve Cropper – guitar
- Donald Dunn – bass guitar
- Al Jackson Jr. – drums
- Wayne Jackson – trumpet
- Joe Arnold – tenor saxophone
- Carla Thomas – vocals on "Tramp"

== Charts ==
=== Album ===
Chart performance for The Dock of the Bay
Chart	Peak position
French Albums (SNEP)	137
German Albums (Offizielle Top 100)	17
Norwegian Albums (VG-lista)	3
UK Albums Chart	1
US Billboard Hot R&B LPs	1
US Billboard Top LPs	4

=== Singles ===
Chart performance for singles from The Dock of the Bay
Song	Chart	Peak position
"I Love You More Than Words Can Say"	US Billboard Hot Rhythm & Blues Singles	30
"I Love You More Than Words Can Say"	US Billboard Hot 100	78
"The Glory of Love"	US Billboard Hot Rhythm & Blues Singles	19
"The Glory of Love"	US Billboard Hot 100	60
"(Sittin' On) The Dock of the Bay"	UK Singles Chart	3
"(Sittin' On) The Dock of the Bay"	US Billboard Hot Rhythm & Blues Singles	1
"(Sittin' On) The Dock of the Bay"	US Billboard Hot 100	1

== Certifications ==
Certifications for The Dock of the Bay
Region	Certification	Certified units/sales
Spain (Promusicae)	Gold	50,000^{^}
^{^} Shipments figures based on certification alone.
