= Ole Man Trouble =

Single by Otis Redding

from the album Otis Blue
- A-side: "Respect"
- Released: August 15, 1965
- Recorded: July 1965
- Studio: Stax, Memphis, Tennessee
- Genre: R&B, soul blues
- Length: 2:25
- Label: Volt/Atco (V-128)
- Songwriter: Otis Redding
- Producer: Steve Cropper

Otis Redding singles chronology
"I've Been Loving You Too Long" (1965)	"Respect" / "Ole Man Trouble" (1965)	"That's How Strong My Love Is" (1965)

"Ole Man Trouble" is a song written by Otis Redding and the first track from his 1965 album Otis Blue: Otis Redding Sings Soul. It was released as the B-side to his hit single "Respect", the second track from Otis Blue. The song is a sign of Redding's emerging mature and reflective side that was to culminate in his posthumous single "(Sittin' On) The Dock of the Bay". "Ole Man Trouble" was also released on Redding's posthumous album The Dock of the Bay.

As the "Dock of the Bay" represents a search for a place to settle down and find peace or a home, an old man is used as a personification for the trouble that can find a person after they have already endured it for some part of their life.

Ole man trouble
Go find you someone else to pick on
I live my life now you see
Ole man trouble
Please stay away from me, now

Oh I look like I'm down in my luck
Please send faith to help pick me up
I've lived this way so many years
Ole man trouble
Please wash away all my fears

Crafted as a blues song with a classic soul melody set to country overtones, "Ole Man Trouble" helped Redding capture the growing white blues/soul market. Note that despite confusion between the two songs being widespread on the internet, this is not the song of the same title covered by Joel Scott Hill, Chris Ethridge and John Barbata on their album "L.A. Getaway" in 1971, which was written by Booker T. Jones.

== Chart history ==
Year	Chart	Position
1965	Black Singles Chart	#4
1965	Pop Singles Chart	#35
1965	Italian Singles Chart	#60
