= Vineville Baptist Church =

Church in Georgia, United States

Coordinates: 32°50′47″N 83°39′44″W

Vineville Baptist Church is a church in Macon, Georgia. Its sister church is Vineville North Baptist Church, founded as a mission of Vineville Baptist Church.

In 1963, the church, under Pastor Dr. Walter L. Moore accepted Ghanaian student Sam Oni at a time when the church and others in the state would not accept an American black man, arguing that he was different from the "American negro". This was revolutionary in churches and racism in the United States.

Otis Redding formerly attended the church as a youth, where his father was pastor, nurturing his singing talents in the church choir.
