= Down in the Valley (Solomon Burke song) =

1962 single by Solomon Burke

Single by Solomon Burke

from the album Solomon Burke's Greatest Hits (1962)
- A-side: "I'm Hanging Up My Heart For You"
- Released: 1962
- Recorded: 1962
- Genre: R&B, Soul
- Length: 2:33
- Label: Atlantic (2147)
- Songwriters: Bert Berns, Solomon Burke
- Producer: Bert Berns

Solomon Burke singles chronology
"Cry To Me" (1961)	"Down in the Valley" (1962)	"I Really Don't Want to Know" (1962)

"Down in the Valley" is a 1962 R&B song written by Bert Berns and Solomon Burke and originally recorded by Solomon Burke. It was released on Atlantic as a B-side to "I'm Hanging Up My Heart For You". It was covered by Otis Redding on his album Otis Blue. Burke's original version is a classic example of early country soul with booming vocals.

== Burke song ==
During a recording session at Atlantic Record on April 4, 1962, Burke recorded five songs, including "I'm Hanging Up My Heart For You" (#15 R&B; #85 Pop) b/w "Down In The Valley" (#20 R&B; #71 Pop) (Atlantic 2147). For "Down in the Valley", Burke borrowed from a traditional folk song "Down in the Valley", that was written as early as 1800, and sung by The Andrews Sisters in the 1944 film Moonlight and Cactus, and by Patti Page in 1951. In August 2008 Burke told Mojo magazine:

I wrote that on the train, 'cos I had no song and I started thinking on old songs that I could do uptempo and I thought, (sings Gospel song pacier, with horn arrangement) so I had to keep that in my head 'til I got to the studio. I said, 'Can I have a tuba like I have in my church?' In my church we got the tuba and the trombones. Got to get that New Orleans sound. They loved it.

Burke recalled: "I put my own feelings and words to it, and was lucky enough by the grace of God to capture the song, when it was in P.D., able to have a copyright on it." "Down in the Valley" debuted in the US charts on May 26, 1965, and peaked at #20 in the R&B charts, #71 in the Pop charts, and at #19 in the Adult Contemporary charts.

== Redding rendition ==
"Down in the Valley"

Song by Otis Redding

from the album Otis Blue
- Released: 1965
- Recorded: 1965
- Studio: Stax, Memphis, Tennessee
- Genre: Soul
- Length: 3:02
- Label: Volt/Atco
- Songwriter: Bert Berns/Solomon Burke
- Producer: Steve Cropper

The song was later covered by Otis Redding on his 1965 album Otis Blue, and was featured in the 1996 film 2 Days in the Valley, and generated income for Cassandra Berns, who inherited the publishing rights from her father, Bert Berns, who was credited as co-writer, along with "Babe" Chivian, and Joseph C. Martin.
