= Live in Chicago (Luther Allison album) =

Live album by Luther Allison
- Released: 1999
- Recorded: June 3, 1995, November 4, 1995 and May 7, 1997
- Venues: The Chicago Blues Festival and Buddy Guy's Legends, Chicago and Zoo Bar, Lincoln, Nebraska
- Genre: Blues
- Length: 131:41
- Labels: Ruf/Alligator; ALCD 4869
- Producer: Jim Gaines

Luther Allison chronology
| Reckless (1997) | Live in Chicago (1999) | Pay It Forward (2002) |

Live in Chicago is a live album by the American blues musician Luther Allison, recorded in Chicago in 1995 and Nebraska in 1997 and released by the Alligator label in 1999.

== Reception ==
Professional ratings
Review scores
| Source | Rating |
|---|---|
| Allmusic | 4/5 stars |
| The Penguin Guide to Blues Recordings | 4/4 stars |

Allmusic reviewer Cub Koda stated "Pulled from performances at the Chicago Blues Festival, Buddy Guy's Legends club with a couple of strays recorded in Lincoln, NE, that were too good not to include, this two-disc set captures Allison at the absolute peak of his powers ... Luther simply played his heart and spirit out right to the end and these recordings spotlight it in a very fine manner. One of the label's best". The Penguin Guide to Blues Recordings said "the band is so well rehearsed that these versions of songs from the three previous Ruf/Alligator albums are easily the equal of the studio originals, apart from the longueurs of stage performance that don't translate to the living room. Rock-blues bombast is also present but for the most part kept in check".

== Track listing ==
All compositions by Luther Allson and James Solberg except where noted

Disc One:

1. Intro by Tom Marker of WXRT-FM, Chicago − 0:23
2. "Soul Fixin' Man" − 4:03
3. "Cherry Red Wine" (Allison) − 8:36
4. "Move from the Hood" − 4:48
5. "Bad Love" − 10:16
6. "Put Your Money Where Your Mouth Is" − 6:00
7. "Big City" − 9:07
8. "Give Me Back My Wig" (Hound Dog Taylor) − 5:22
9. "It Hurts Me Too" (Hudson Whittaker) − 7:40
10. "Medley: Gambler's Blues/Sweet Little Angel" (B.B. King, Johnny Pate) − 10:25
- Recorded at the Chicago Blues Festival on June 3, 1995 (tracks 1–7, 9 & 10) and Buddy Guy's Legends on November 4, 1995 (track 8)

Disc Two:

1. "Party Time" (Allison) − 5:20
2. "All the King's Horses" − 12:19
3. "What Have I Done Wrong?" (Sam Maghett) − 7:10
4. "Walking Papers" − 6:48
5. "Think with Your Heart" − 6:27
6. "What's Going On in My Home?" − 7:13
7. "Will It Ever Change?" − 5:48
8. "You're Gonna Make Me Cry" (Deadric Malone) − 8:26
9. "Everything's Gonna Be All Right" (Walter Jacobs) − 5:30
- Recorded at Buddy Guy's Legends on November 4, 1995 (tracks 2–5 & 9) and the Zoo Bar, Lincoln, Nebraska (tracks 2 & 6–8)

== Personnel ==
- Luther Allison − lead guitar, vocals
- James Solberg − rhythm guitar, lead guitar
- Mike Vlahakis − keyboards
- Ken Faltinson − bass
- Robb Stupka (Disc One: 2–7 & 9), J. Mattes (Disc One: 8; Disc Two: 2–5 & 9), Willie Hayes (Disc Two: 1 & 6–8) − drums
- With The Memphis Horns: (Disc One: 2–7 & 9)
  - Wayne Jackson − trumpet
  - Andrew Love − tenor saxophone
- Added on "Medley": (Disc One: 10)
  - Otis Rush − lead guitar, vocals
  - Eddie C. Campbell − lead guitar
  - John Kattke − rhythm guitar
  - Dave Rice − keyboards
  - Ken Anderson − trumpet
  - Bobby Neely − tenor saxophone
  - Willie Henderson − baritone saxophone
  - Leonard Gill − bass
  - Ray Stewart − drums
