= Complete & Unbelievable: The Otis Redding Dictionary of Soul =

Studio album by Otis Redding
- Released: October 1966
- Genre: Memphis soul
- Length: 36:15
- Label: Volt; Atco
- Producer: Jim Stewart

Otis Redding chronology
The Soul Album (1966)	Complete & Unbelievable: The Otis Redding Dictionary of Soul (1966)	King & Queen (1967)

Complete & Unbelievable: The Otis Redding Dictionary of Soul, or simply Dictionary of Soul, is the fifth studio album by the American soul singer-songwriter Otis Redding and his last solo studio album released before his death. The successful Otis Blue and the following performance at Whisky a Go Go led to his rising fame across the United States. The first side of the album mainly contains cover versions, and the second songs mainly written by Redding.

The Otis Redding Dictionary of Soul was released in October 1966 on the Stax label and peaked at number 73 and at number 5 on the Billboard 200 and the R&B LP charts respectively. The album produced two singles, "Fa-Fa-Fa-Fa-Fa (Sad Song)" and "Try a Little Tenderness". In 2000 it was voted number 488 in Colin Larkin's All Time Top 1000 Albums. In 2012, the album was ranked number 254 on Rolling Stone magazine's list of The 500 Greatest Albums of All Time. An expanded version, which includes stereo and mono mixes of the original album as well as additional tracks, was released in 2016.

== Background ==
The success of Redding's third album, Otis Blue, saw a rearrangement of the Stax company. Producer and co-founder of the American label Stax Records, Phil Walden, signed musicians including Percy Sledge, Johnnie Taylor, Clarence Carter, and Eddie Floyd, and together with Redding they founded the production companies "Jotis Records" (derived from Joe Galkin and Otis), on which only four recordings were released, two by Arthur Conley and one by Billy Young and Loretta Williams, and Redwal Music (derived from Redding and Walden).

Redding decided to perform at the nightclub Whisky a Go Go on the Sunset Strip in front of a predominantly white audience, becoming one of the first soul artists to play in the western United States. His performance received critical acclaim by the press, and musician Bob Dylan offered an alternative track of his hit song "Just Like a Woman" to him, but he declined his proposal. After his performance there he went back to the Stax studios to continue recording new songs. This would be his final solo studio album.

== Recording ==
Dictionary of Soul features the Booker T. & the M.G.'s—organist Booker T. Jones, pianist/guitarist Steve Cropper, bassist Donald "Duck" Dunn, drummer Al Jackson, Jr.—pianist Isaac Hayes, and the Memphis Horns, consisting of tenor saxophonist Joe Arnold, trumpeter Wayne Jackson, tenor saxophonist Andrew Love and baritone saxophonist Floyd Newman.

The album opens with "Fa-Fa-Fa-Fa-Fa (Sad Song)". Derived from the theme of The $64,000 Question, the song was written by Redding and Cropper and its lyrics are about Redding's habit to hum or sing the horn lines. David Porter served as the background singer, singing the "fa-fa-fa-fa-fa" part alongside Redding.

The second single on this album, "Try a Little Tenderness", was written by English songwriter duo Jimmy Campbell, Reg Connelly, and American Tin Pan Alley songwriter Harry M. Woods in the early 30s, but it was not until February 1933 when bandleader and clarinetist Ted Lewis' version became a hit. The first version by a black artist was by Aretha Franklin, who recorded it in 1962 for her The Tender, the Moving, the Swinging Aretha Franklin. Two years later, Sam Cooke recorded it as a part of a medley alongside Tin Pan Alley standard "For Sentimental Reasons" and "You Send Me" on his At The Copa. According to Cropper, Redding listened to the latter two songs but rearranged it with the help of pianist Hayes. Examples of what the latter arranged and introduced were the tree-part, contrapuntal horn line in the first seconds, which was inspired by Cooke's "A Change is Gonna Come" strings, and the cymbal break in the peak, which Hayes later featured on his "Theme from Shaft". The song was recorded on September 13 and released on November 14, 1966, charting at number 25 on the Billboard Hot 100 and at number 4 on the Hot R&B chart. Parts of the song were later mixed in the Grammy Award-winning "Otis" by hip-hop artists Jay-Z and Kanye West. Side one features mainly cover versions, including country standard "Tennessee Waltz" and The Beatles' "Day Tripper", the latter of which was praised for turning "into a swaggering stomper" as opposed to the original.

Side two is mainly composed of Redding songs, the exception being Chuck Willis' "You're Still My Baby" and "Love Have Mercy", co-written by David Porter and Hayes. The Otis Redding Dictionary of Soul was released on October 15, 1966 on the Stax label and peaked at number 73 and at number 5 on the Billboard 200 and the R&B LP charts respectively.

== Reception ==
Professional ratings
Review scores
Source	Rating
AllMusic	5/5 stars
Encyclopedia of Popular Music	4/5 stars
MusicHound R&B	4/5
The Rolling Stone Album Guide	4/5 stars

The Otis Redding Dictionary of Soul received positive critical reception. In a retrospective review Mark Deming of AllMusic gave the album 5 out of 5 stars, stating that it "found the rugged-voiced deep soul singer continuing to expand the boundaries of his style while staying true to his rough and passionate signature sound." He liked "My Lover's Prayer" and "Fa-Fa-Fa-Fa-Fa (Sad Song)", asserting each song was worthy of an Academy Award. The backing bands were for him "thoroughly distinctive and remarkably adaptable, fitting to the nooks and crannies of Redding's voice with their supple but muscular performances." Magazine Rolling Stone rated the album 4 out of 5 stars, stating that Redding "delivers one of his most mature performances, smoky and at times almost langorous" in "Try a Little Tenderness", and the second single is "hard and precise but swinging." In 2009, Daryl Easlea of BBC music gave the album a positive review and stated that Redding was at the "peak of his powers" when he recorded it. One song from the album, "Try a Little Tenderness", was said by Easlea to be Redding's most remembered song after only "(Sittin' on) The Dock of the Bay", which was released posthumously shortly after his death. The album was ranked at number 251 on Rolling Stone's The 500 Greatest Albums of All Time, 254 in a 2012 revised list, and 448 in a 2020 revised list. It was also included in Robert Christgau's "Basic Record Library" of 1950s and 1960s recordings, published in Christgau's Record Guide: Rock Albums of the Seventies (1981). Critic Jon Landau called it "The finest record ever to come out of Memphis and certainly the best example of modern soul ever recorded."

Cash Box said of the single "Fa-Fa-Fa-Fa-Fa (Sad Song)" that it is "a pulsing, contagious wailer packed with 'soul.'" Cash Box described "My Lover's Prayer" as a "tender, slow-shufflin’ romancer about a head-over-heels in love fella who tells his gal that he will always be there when she needs him."

== Track listing ==
Track listing adapted from Allmusic.

Side one
No.	Title	Writer(s)	Length
1.	"Fa-Fa-Fa-Fa-Fa (Sad Song)"	Steve Cropper, Otis Redding	2:44
2.	"I'm Sick Y'all"	Cropper, David Porter, Redding	2:57
3.	"Tennessee Waltz"	Pee Wee King, Redd Stewart	2:57
4.	"Sweet Lorene"	Isaac Hayes, Alvertis Isbell, Redding	2:31
5.	"Try a Little Tenderness"	Jimmy Campbell, Reginald Connelly, Harry M. Woods	3:51
6.	"Day Tripper"	John Lennon, Paul McCartney	2:36
Total length:			17:35

Side two
No.	Title	Writer(s)	Length
7.	"My Lover's Prayer"	Redding	3:12
8.	"She Put the Hurt on Me"	Redding	2:40
9.	"Ton of Joy"	Redding	2:56
10.	"You're Still My Baby"	Chuck Willis	3:53
11.	"Hawg for You"	Redding	3:30
12.	"Love Have Mercy"	Hayes, Porter	2:29
Total length:			18:40 (36:15)

== Personnel ==
Credits adapted from Allmusic.

- Otis Redding – vocals
- Booker T. Jones – bass guitar, keyboards, vibraphone
- Isaac Hayes – keyboards, piano
- Steve Cropper – guitar
- Donald Dunn – bass guitar
- Al Jackson Jr. – drums
- Wayne Jackson – trumpet
- Gil Caple – tenor saxophone (on "Try a Little Tenderness")
- Andrew Love, Joe Arnold – tenor saxophone
- Floyd Newman – baritone saxophone

== Charts ==
=== Album ===
Chart	Peak position
Billboard Pop chart	73
Billboard R&B chart	5

=== Singles ===
Song	Chart	Peak position
"Fa-Fa-Fa-Fa-Fa (Sad Song)"	Billboard Pop chart	29
"Fa-Fa-Fa-Fa-Fa (Sad Song)"	Billboard R&B chart	12
"Try A Little Tenderness"	Billboard Pop chart	25
"Try A Little Tenderness"	Billboard R&B chart	4
