= The Sound of Wilson Pickett =

Studio album by Wilson Pickett
- Released: July 1967
- Recorded: FAME, Muscle Shoals, Alabama
- Genre: R&B
- Length: 28:11
- Label: Atlantic
- Producer: Rick Hall, Tom Dowd, Jerry Wexler

Wilson Pickett chronology
Wicked Pickett [Atlantic] (1966)	The Sound of Wilson Pickett (1967)	I'm in Love (1968)

Professional ratings
Review scores
Source	Rating
AllMusic	4.5/5 stars
The Encyclopedia of Popular Music	4/5 stars
MusicHound Rock: The Essential Album Guide	4/5 stars

The Sound of Wilson Pickett is a studio album by Wilson Pickett, released in 1967.

== Track listing ==
No.	Title	Writer	Length
1.	"Soul Dance Number Three"	Wilson Pickett, Jerry Wexler	2:41
2.	"Funky Broadway"	Arlester "Dyke" Christian	2:36
3.	"I Need a Lot of Loving Every Day"	Dan Penn, Lindon Oldham	2:23
4.	"I Found A Love, Part I"	Wilson Pickett, Willie Schofield, Robert West	2:34
5.	"I Found A Love, Part II"	Wilson Pickett, Willie Schofield, Robert West	3:00
6.	"You Can't Stand Alone"	Rudy Clark	2:51
7.	"Mojo Mamma"	Bert Berns, Jerry Wexler	2:02
8.	"I Found The One"	Bobby Womack	2:33
9.	"Something Within Me"	Bobby Womack	3:43
10.	"I'm Sorry About That"	Bobby Womack	3:06
11.	"Love Is a Beautiful Thing"	Felix Cavaliere, Eddie Brigati	2:15

== Personnel ==
- Wilson Pickett – vocals
- Spooner Oldham – keyboards, piano, organ
- Chips Moman – lead guitar
- Jimmy Johnson – rhythm guitar
- Tommy Cogbill – bass guitar
- Albert S. Lowe, Jr – bass guitar
- Roger Hawkins – drums
- Wayne Jackson – trumpet
- Gene Miller – trumpet
- Andrew Love – tenor saxophone
- Charles Chalmers – tenor saxophone
- James Mitchell – tenor saxophone
- Floyd Newman – baritone saxophone

Technical

- Rick Hall, Tom Dowd – recording engineer
- Haig Adishian – cover design
- Nick Samardge – cover photography
