= The Soul Album =

Studio album by Otis Redding
- Released: April 1966
- Genre: Soul
- Length: 33:56
- Label: Volt/Atco
- Producer: Jim Stewart; Booker T. & the MG's; Isaac Hayes; David Porter

Otis Redding chronology
Otis Blue/Otis Redding Sings Soul (1965)	The Soul Album (1966)	Complete & Unbelievable: The Otis Redding Dictionary of Soul (1966)

The Soul Album is the fourth studio album by the American soul singer-songwriter Otis Redding, released in 1966. It features Redding performing songs that he co-wrote as well as covers of songs by such musicians as Sam Cooke, Eddie Floyd, Roy Head, and Smokey Robinson. Guitarist Steve Cropper contributed guitar on the album and is also credited as the co-author of three tracks.

The Soul Album entered the Billboard LP charts upon its release in April 1966 and made the Hot 100 chart in June. The album peaked at number 54 in July and remained among the 100 best-selling albums until autumn. It spent 28 weeks on the US R&B albums chart, peaking at number 3, and reached number 58 on the US pop and rock charts.

== Cover art ==
The cover of The Soul Album was designed by Loring Eutemey of Atlantic Records. According to author Jonathan Gould, the album's cover photo "drew a stark contrast with the racial obfuscation of Otis Blue [Redding's previous album] by presenting Fleurette Carter, a full-color portrait of a strikingly beautiful African American model wearing a head scarf and a coy half-smile, her warm brown eyes staring directly into the lens."

== Critical reception ==
Professional ratings
Review scores
Source	Rating
Allmusic	4/5 stars
Encyclopedia of Popular Music	4/5 stars

Bruce Eder of AllMusic gave the album a positive review, writing that it "shows [Redding] moving from strength to strength in a string of high-energy, sweaty soul performances, interspersing his own songs with work by Sam Cooke ("Chain Gang"), Roy Head ("Treat Her Right"), Eddie Floyd ("Everybody Makes a Mistake"), and Smokey Robinson ("It's Growing") and recasting them in his own style, so that they're not 'covers' so much as reinterpretations [...]". Eder also refers to the track "Cigarettes and Coffee" as "the jewel of this undervalued collection".

== Track listing ==
Side one
No.	Title	Writer(s)	Length
1.	"Just One More Day"	Otis Redding, Steve Cropper, McElvoy Robinson	3:31
2.	"It's Growing"	Smokey Robinson, Warren "Pete" Moore	2:47
3.	"Cigarettes and Coffee"	Jerry Butler, Eddie Thomas, Jay Walker	3:53
4.	"Chain Gang"	Sam Cooke	3:04
5.	"Nobody Knows You When You're Down and Out"	James Cox	3:11

Side two
No.	Title	Writer(s)	Length
6.	"Good to Me"	Redding, Julius Green	3:51
7.	"Scratch My Back"	James Moore	2:42
8.	"Treat Her Right"	Roy Head, Gene Kurtz	2:11
9.	"Everybody Makes a Mistake"	Eddie Floyd, Alvertis Isbell	3:23
10.	"Any Ole Way"	Redding, Cropper	2:34
11.	"634-5789 (Soulsville, U.S.A.)"	Cropper, Floyd	2:49

== Personnel ==
- Otis Redding – vocals
- Booker T. Jones, Isaac Hayes – keyboards, piano
- Steve Cropper – guitar
- Donald Dunn – bass guitar
- Al Jackson Jr. – drums
- Wayne Jackson, Sammy Coleman, Gene "Bowlegs" Miller – trumpet
- Charles "Packy" Axton, Andrew Love – tenor saxophone
- Floyd Newman – baritone saxophone
