= Otis Blue/Otis Redding Sings Soul =

Studio album by Otis Redding
- Released: September 15, 1965
- Recorded: July 9–10, 1965; (except April 1965 for the mono version of "I've Been Loving You Too Long")
- Studio: Stax (Memphis)
- Genres: Soul; R&B; blues; rock; Southern soul
- Length: 32:22
- Label: Volt
- Producers: Jim Stewart; Steve Cropper

Otis Redding chronology
The Great Otis Redding Sings Soul Ballads (1965)	Otis Blue/Otis Redding Sings Soul (1965)	The Soul Album (1966)

Otis Blue/Otis Redding Sings Soul (often referred to simply as Otis Blue) is the third studio album by the American soul singer and songwriter Otis Redding. It was first released on September 15, 1965, as an LP record through the Stax Records subsidiary label Volt.

Otis Blue is composed mainly of cover versions of contemporary R&B hits, exploring themes from the blues and love ballads, among others. Three of the LP's eleven songs were written by Redding, and three others were written by fellow soul singer Sam Cooke, who had died several months before the album was made. Except for one track, Otis Blue was recorded entirely on July 9 and 10, 1965, at the Stax recording studio in Memphis, Tennessee. As with Redding's previous records, he was backed by the Stax house band Booker T. & the M.G.'s, a horn section featuring members of the Mar-Keys and the Memphis Horns, and pianist Isaac Hayes, providing a rhythmic Southern soul accompaniment for the singer's exuberant and forceful performances.

Otis Blue was a crossover success for Redding and proved one of his best-selling LPs with more than 250,000 copies sold. It was his first to top the US R&B LPs chart and also reached number 6 on the UK Albums Chart, while three of its singles became top 40 hits: the Redding original "I've Been Loving You Too Long", the Rolling Stones cover "Satisfaction", and "Respect" (later repopularized by Aretha Franklin). Released at the beginning of the album era, Otis Blue is considered by critics to be Redding's first fully realized LP and the definitive soul album of its period. It ranks frequently and highly on professional listings of the best albums, including Rolling Stone magazine's "500 Greatest Albums of All Time" (at number 178) and Time magazine's "All-Time 100 Greatest Albums" (at number 92). A two-disc collector's edition of Otis Blue was released in 2008 by Rhino Records.

== Background ==
Stax Records president Jim Stewart had released Otis Redding's "These Arms of Mine" as a single after hearing him sing it at an audition in 1962. When it charted, he signed Redding to the label. The moderately successful LP albums Pain in My Heart (1964) and The Great Otis Redding Sings Soul Ballads (1965) followed, with both performing well on the newly established R&B LPs chart (published by Billboard), although not on its pop counterpart. Preparations for a third album followed soon after, which would also serve as Redding's second to be released through Volt Records, a subsidiary label of Stax.

== Recording ==
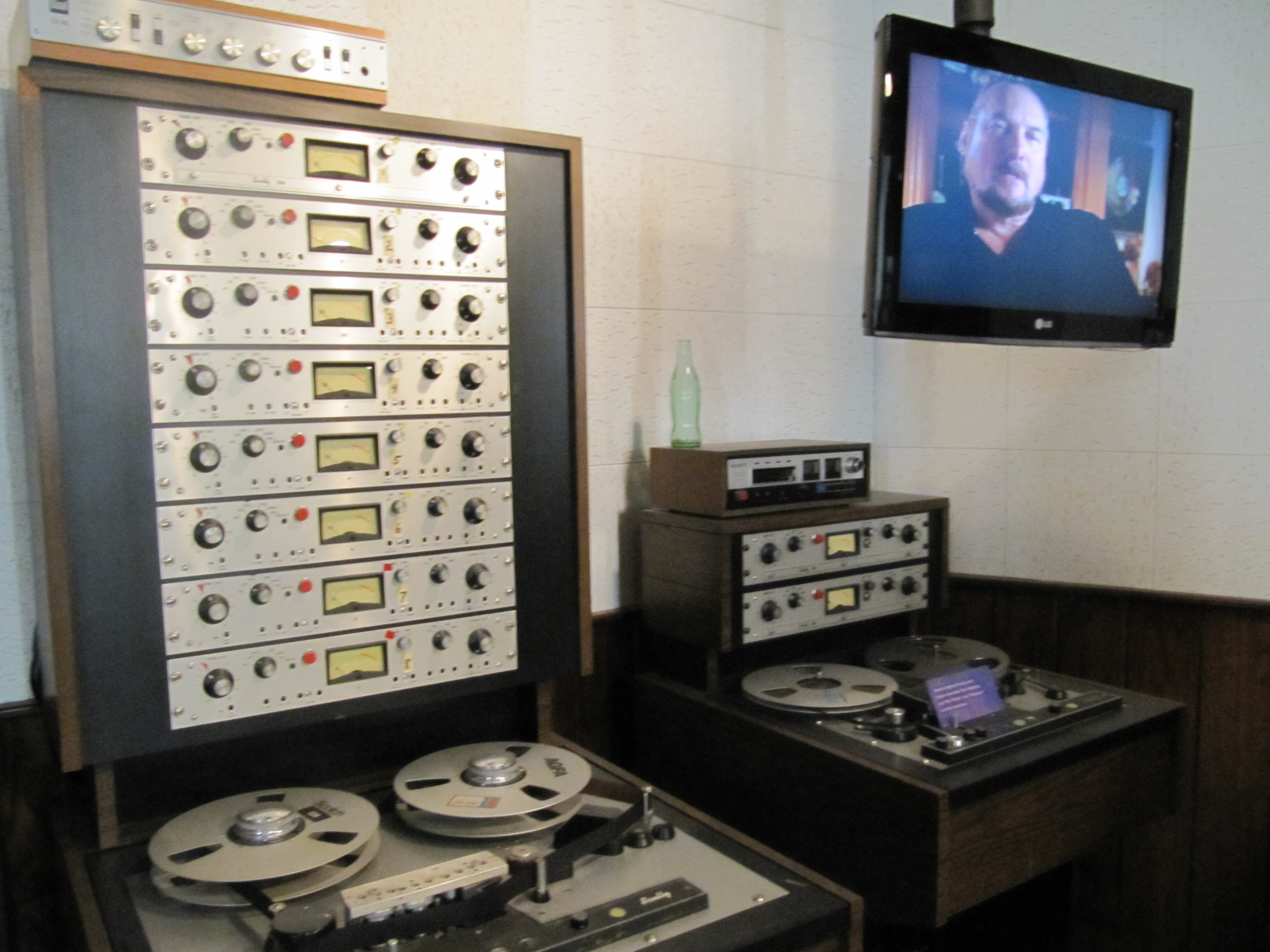
Recording equipment from the Stax studio preserved at the Stax Museum of American Soul Music in Memphis; house-band player Steve Cropper shown on an adjacent screen, 2013

Redding recorded the album with the Stax house band, Booker T. & the M.G.'s (keyboardist/bandleader Booker T. Jones, guitarist Steve Cropper, bassist Donald "Duck" Dunn, drummer Al Jackson Jr.); Isaac Hayes on piano; and a horn section consisting of members of the Mar-Keys and the Memphis Horns. Apart from one track, the album was recorded in under 24 hours in two sessions within a 28-hour period between 10 am on July 9 (a Saturday) and 2 pm on July 10, 1965, with a break from 8 pm Saturday to 2 am on Sunday to allow the house band to play local gigs.

As with Redding's previous album, engineer Tom Dowd came to the studio to assist the recording, considering Redding to be a "genius" alongside the likes of Bobby Darin and Ray Charles. "Ole Man Trouble", placed as the opening track on the LP, was finished in sessions earlier than the other songs and later released as a B-side of "Respect". The album's fifth track, "I've Been Loving You Too Long", had been previously recorded in April in mono with Booker T. Jones on piano. It was released as a single that month and became a number-two hit on Billboard's R&B chart; it was re-recorded in stereo for the album.

== Music and lyrics ==
The Stax crew during Otis Blue's recording, from left to right: Cropper, Donald "Duck" Dunn, engineer Tom Dowd, David Porter, Julius Green, Andrew Love, Floyd Newman, Wayne Jackson, and Isaac Hayes.

The majority of the tracks on Otis Blue are cover versions, including three songs originally by fellow soul singer Sam Cooke, who had been shot dead in December 1964. According to Jason Mendelsohn of PopMatters, the album is a "set of soul standards, blues and rock covers, Motown hits, and original material". The album opens with the "mournfully harried" "Ole Man Trouble", described by fellow PopMatters writer Claudrena N. Harold as one of Redding's most phantasmagoric tunes. The lyrics deal with a man, who is "unable to escape the brutal realities of the blues", and has been compared with Paul Robeson's "Ole Man River".

"Respect" was possibly inspired by a quote of drummer Al Jackson Jr., who allegedly said to Redding after a tour, "What are you griping about? You're on the road all the time. All you can look for is a little respect when you come home." An alternative story is told by Redding's friend and road manager, Earl "Speedo" Sims, who states that the song "came from a group I was singing with", and that even though Redding rewrote it, "a lot of the lyric was still there"; Sims adds: "He told me I would get a credit, but I never did". Sims also states that he sang the backing vocals in the chorus. Essentially a ballad, "Respect" is an uptempo and energetic song, which took "a day to write, 20 minutes to arrange, and one take to record", according to Redding. Aretha Franklin covered this song in 1967 and with it topped the Billboard R&B and Pop charts. Redding shouted to a woman for more respect, while Franklin ironically countered the song and transformed it into a "feminist hymn".

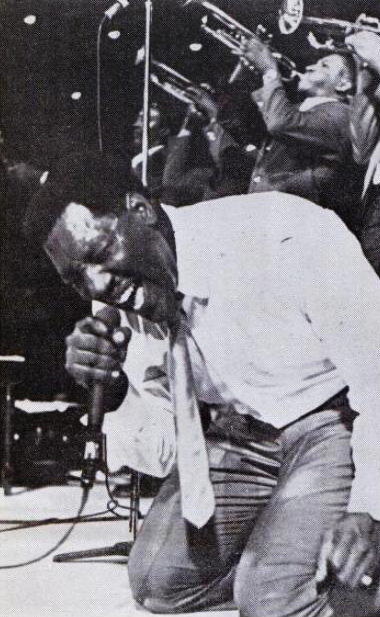
Redding (1966) performs in a forceful and energetic style throughout the album.

The next song is an energetic version of Sam Cooke's ballad, "Change Gonna Come"; a protest against racial segregation and disrespect for black people. "Down in the Valley" is a funky cover of Solomon Burke's original, with whom Redding toured before the recording. Nate Patrin of Pitchfork felt that the song "ratchets up both the gospel beatitude and the secular lust". The love song "I've Been Loving You Too Long" was co-written by Redding and the Impressions' lead singer Jerry Butler in a hotel near the Atlanta airport. Redding's rendition of Cooke's "Shake" is again funkier. The song is about the club dancing in the so-called discothèques, which debuted in the early 1960s. The song was described as "a hard-swinging, full-throated 2:40 of precision ferocity with a force that would flat-out explode during his live sets."

The last five songs are all covers by popular artists: the Temptations' "My Girl", written by Smokey Robinson and Ronald White; Cooke's "Wonderful World"; B.B. King's "Rock Me Baby"; the Rolling Stones' "Satisfaction", on which Redding sings "fashion" instead of "faction"; and William Bell's "You Don't Miss Your Water", which was characterized as "sorrowful country blues", and has "one of the most devastating pleading-man lead vocals in the entire Stax catalog." "Satisfaction" sounded so plausible that a journalist even accused the Stones of stealing the song from Redding, and that they performed it after Redding. Music writer Robert Christgau describes it as an "anarchic reading" of the Stones' original.

== Release ==
Otis Blue was released on September 15, 1965, with Volt issuing the album in the US and Atlantic Records releasing it in the UK. The album sold more than 250,000 copies, according to music journalist Tony Fletcher, who notes its use of a photo of a white woman on the cover in comparison to the self-representative cover of Redding contemporary Wilson Pickett's "In the Midnight Hour" (1965), which, conversely, "languished in the R&B racks". The woman in the image, a stock photo, has never been definitively identified, but is believed to be German model Dagmar Dreger. Although Otis Blue only reached number 75 on the Pop LPs chart in 1966, three of its singles charted on the Billboard Hot 100: "I've Been Loving You Too Long" charted for 11 weeks and peaked at number 21, "Respect" spent 11 weeks and reached number 35, and "Shake" spent six weeks and reached number 47. Both the stereo and mono versions of Otis Blue charted in the United Kingdom; the former spent 21 weeks and reached number six in 1966, and the latter spent 54 weeks and reached number seven in 1967. Two different pressings of the song "My Girl" also charted in the UK; a 7-inch single peaked at number 11 and charted for 16 weeks in 1965, and a reissued single in 1968 reached number 36 and charted for nine weeks. "Satisfaction" peaked at number 33 and "Shake" peaked at number 28 in the UK.

Otis Blue's commercial performance helped Redding cross over into the pop market. Summarizing its mainstream impact, Alan Lewis from Record Collector called Otis Blue "the soul album that sealed [Redding's] world reputation as the soul singer. The one whose title, with hindsight, probably did most to establish the use of the word 'soul' to define the music previously known as R&B." It also served as evidence that "the album era was here", according to music journalist Mat Snow, who cites it among a series of mid-1960s rock LPs – the Rolling Stones' Aftermath, the Beach Boys' Pet Sounds, Bob Dylan's Blonde on Blonde, the Beatles' Revolver, and the Who's A Quick One – proving hit singles were "no longer pop's most important money spinners and artistic statements". PopMatters journalist Eric Klinger added that it was uniquely successful as a soul LP, noting that "outside of rock music, the album was a basically untapped medium. LPs were almost an afterthought, with a couple of recent hit singles and enough filler to justify the $2.98 cost." In 2022 it was certified Gold by the British Phonographic Industry, indicating 100,000 equivalent-units in the UK.

== Critical reception and legacy ==
Retrospective professional reviews
Review scores
Source	Rating
AllMusic	5/5 stars
Blender	4/5 stars
Encyclopedia of Popular Music	5/5 stars
MusicHound R&B	5/5
Pitchfork	10/10
PopMatters	9/10
Q	5/5 stars
Record Collector	5/5 stars
Rolling Stone	5/5 stars
The Rolling Stone Album Guide	5/5 stars

Otis Blue has been regarded by music critics as Redding's best work. Uncut magazine's Neil Spencer called it "the greatest album of his career [and] arguably the definitive album of the soul era", while Rolling Stone described it as "Redding's true dictionary of soul, a stunning journey through the past and future vocabulary of R&B ... documenting a masterful artist rising to ... the immense challenge of his times." In The New Rolling Stone Album Guide (2004), Paul Evans named it Redding's "first masterwork", and fellow Rolling Stone critic David Fricke called it "perfect". Writing for Blender, Christgau appraised it as "the first great album by one of soul's few reliable long-form artists", while The Mojo Collection regarded it as "the definitive Southern soul album" and Patrin deemed it the "greatest studio-recorded soul LP" from the 1960s.

In a retrospective review for Pitchfork, Patrin went on to call Otis Blue "a hell of a record, the crowning achievement of a man who could sound pained and celebratory and tender and gritty and proud all at once, with a voice that everyone from John Fogerty to Swamp Dogg to Cee-lo owes a debt to". Bruce Eder from AllMusic explained further that "Redding's powerful, remarkable singing throughout makes Otis Blue gritty, rich, and achingly alive, and an essential listening experience", showcasing "his talent unfettered, his direction clear, and his confidence emboldened". "Song for song, it's difficult to imagine a better soul record", wrote Stephen Deusner in the Memphis Flyer, crediting the singer's "effortlessly expressive vocals" and the "measured accompaniment" of the Stax house band. Similarly, Spencer praised "Cropper's stinging guitar and the atonal Memphis horns", saying it is "as much their album as Redding's", while Q noted how the performers' individual musical elements coalesce with "a beautiful precision which borders on a kind of Southern soul sorcery ... arguably the hottest and strongest half-hour in soul". Angus Taylor of BBC Music found Otis Blue to be "at the crossroads of pop, rock, gospel, blues and soul", with a series of "short, punchy" songs "flawlessly ordered to ebb and flow between stirring balladry and foot stomping exuberance", making it Redding's "definitive statement". Harold, in PopMatters, also praised the diverse sound, which, according to her, is a mixture of "Motown pop, the blues, British rock, and Southern Soul", although she cited Complete & Unbelievable: The Otis Redding Dictionary of Soul (1966) as Redding's best album.

Otis Blue has featured on many professional lists of the best albums. According to Lewis, it is "predictably named as a Top 100 album, the token soul set in lists compiled by trendies who surely never bought it at the time." In 1993, NME ranked it 35th on the magazine's "Greatest Albums of All Time" issue and 405th on a similar list in 2013. The album was also ranked at number 74 on Rolling Stone's "500 Greatest Albums of All Time" (2003), number 78 in a 2012 revised edition of the list, and number 178 in a 2020 revised edition. Time placed it at number 92 on the magazine's "All-Time 100 Greatest Albums". It has also appeared in Q magazine's "Best Soul Albums of All Time" and Robert Dimery's 1001 Albums You Must Hear Before You Die.

== Track listing ==
Side one
No.	Title	Writer(s)	Length
1.	"Ole Man Trouble"	Otis Redding	2:55
2.	"Respect"	Redding	2:05
3.	"Change Gonna Come"	Sam Cooke	4:17
4.	"Down in the Valley"	Bert Berns, Solomon Burke, Babe Chivian, Joe Martin	3:02
5.	"I've Been Loving You Too Long"	Redding, Jerry Butler	3:10

Side two
No.	Title	Writer(s)	Length
1.	"Shake"	Cooke	2:35
2.	"My Girl"	Smokey Robinson, Ronald White	2:52
3.	"Wonderful World"	Cooke, Lou Adler, Herb Alpert	3:00
4.	"Rock Me Baby"	B.B. King	3:20
5.	"Satisfaction"	Mick Jagger, Keith Richards	2:45
6.	"You Don't Miss Your Water"	William Bell	2:53

=== 2008 collector's edition ===
An expanded double-disc collector's edition of Otis Blue was released in 2008 by Rhino Records. It includes both the stereo and mono versions of the original album alongside bonus tracks in B-sides, live recordings, and previously unreleased alternate mixes. Christgau graded the edition with four out of five stars, saying it "comes with many useless alternate takes, but also with live tracks that preserve for history Redding's country-goes-uptown style of fun".

Disc one: Otis Blue (mono version) and selections from In Person at the Whisky a Go Go (1968)
No.	Title	Length
1.	"Ole Man Trouble"
2.	"Respect"
3.	"Change Gonna Come"
4.	"Down in the Valley"
5.	"I've Been Loving You Too Long"
6.	"Shake"
7.	"My Girl"
8.	"Wonderful World"
9.	"Rock Me Baby"
10.	"Satisfaction"
11.	"You Don't Miss Your Water"
12.	"I've Been Loving You Too Long" (Previously unreleased / Mono)
13.	"I'm Depending on You" (Bonus track)
14.	"Respect" (Previously unreleased / Mono)
15.	"Ole Man Trouble" (Previously unreleased / Mono)
16.	"Any Ole Way" (Bonus track)
17.	"Shake" (Bonus track: Live 1967, Stereo Mix of Single Version)
18.	"Ole Man Trouble" (Bonus track: Live at the Whisky a Go Go)
19.	"Respect" (Bonus track: Live at the Whisky a Go Go)
20.	"I've Been Loving You Too Long" (Bonus track: Live at the Whisky a Go Go)
21.	"Satisfaction" (Bonus track: Live at the Whisky a Go Go)
22.	"I'm Depending on You" (Bonus track: Live at the Whisky a Go Go)
23.	"Any Ole Way" (Bonus track: Live at the Whisky a Go Go)

Disco two: Otis Blue (stereo) and selections from Live in Europe (1967)
No.	Title	Length
1.	"Ole Man Trouble"
2.	"Respect"
3.	"Change Gonna Come"
4.	"Down in the Valley"
5.	"I've Been Loving You Too Long"
6.	"Shake"
7.	"My Girl"
8.	"Wonderful World"
9.	"Rock Me Baby"
10.	"Satisfaction"
11.	"You Don't Miss Your Water"
12.	"Respect" (Bonus track: 1967 version)
13.	"I've Been Loving You Too Long" (Bonus track: Live in Europe)
14.	"My Girl" (Bonus track: Live in Europe)
15.	"Shake" (Bonus track: Live in Europe)
16.	"Satisfaction" (Bonus track: Live in Europe)
17.	"Respect" (Bonus track: Live in Europe)

== Charts ==
=== Album ===
Weekly chart performance for Otis Blue/Otis Redding Sings Soul
Chart (1965–1968)	Peak position
UK Disc and Music Echo Top Ten LPs	10
UK Melody Maker Top Ten LPs	7
UK New Musical Express Best Selling LPs in Britain	4
UK Record Mirror Top R&B Albums	1
UK Record Retailer LPs Chart	6
US Billboard Top LP's	75
US Billboard Top Selling R&B LP's	1
US Cash Box Top 100 Albums	73
US Record World 100 Top LP's	55

=== Singles ===
Song	Chart	Peak position
"Respect" b/w "Ole Man Trouble"	Billboard Pop chart	35
"Respect" b/w "Ole Man Trouble"	Billboard R&B chart	4
"I've Been Loving You Too Long" b/w "Just One More Day"	Billboard Pop chart	21
"I've Been Loving You Too Long" b/w "Just One More Day"	Billboard R&B chart	2
"Shake" b/w "You Don't Miss Your Water"	Billboard Pop chart	47
"Shake" b/w "You Don't Miss Your Water"	Billboard R&B chart	16
"Satisfaction" b/w "Any Ole Way"	Billboard Pop chart	31
"Satisfaction" b/w "Any Ole Way"	Billboard R&B chart	4

== Certifications ==
Region	Certification	Certified units/sales
United Kingdom (BPI)	Gold	100,000^{‡}
^{‡} Sales+streaming figures based on certification alone.

== Personnel ==
Musicians

- Otis Redding – vocals
- Booker T. Jones, Isaac Hayes – keyboards, piano
- Steve Cropper – guitar
- Donald Dunn – bass guitar
- Al Jackson Jr. – drums
- Wayne Jackson, Gene "Bowlegs" Miller – trumpet
- Andrew Love – tenor saxophone
- Floyd Newman – baritone saxophone
- William Bell – backing vocals (track 2)
- Earl Sims – backing vocals (track 2)

Additional personnel

- Tom Dowd – engineer
- Jim Stewart – supervision
- Yves Beauvais – reissue producer
- Bill Inglot, Dan Hersch – remastering
- Pete Sahula – cover photo
- Haig Adishian – cover design
- Bob Rolontz – liner notes

== See also ==
- List of number-one R&B albums of 1965 (U.S.)

== Bibliography ==
- Bowman, Rob (1997). Soulsville U.S.A.: The Story of Stax Records. New York, NY: Schirmer Trade. ISBN 978-0-8256-7284-2. OCLC 36824884.
- Freeman, Scott (2002). Otis!: The Otis Redding Story. St. Martin's Press. ISBN 978-0-312-30297-9. OCLC 47443887.
- Gulla, Bob (2007). Icons of R&B and Soul: An Encyclopedia of the Artists Who Revolutionized Rhythm, Volume 1. Greenwood Press. ISBN 978-0-313-34044-4. OCLC 220310006.
- Guralnick, Peter (1999). Sweet Soul Music: Rhythm and Blues and the Southern Dream of Freedom. Back Bay Books. ISBN 978-0-316-33273-6. OCLC 41950519.
- Otis Blue album liner notes by Bob Rolontz. Atlantic Recording Corp.
- Black, Johnny (2008). Classic Tracks Back to Back: Singles and Albums. Thunder Bay Press. ISBN 978-1-59223-872-9.
- Wyman, Bill; Coleman, Ray (November 20, 1990). Stone alone: the story of a rock 'n' roll band. Viking. ISBN 978-0-670-82894-4.
