= Andrew Love (musician) =

American saxophone player

Andrew M. Love
- Born: November 21, 1941; Memphis, Tennessee, U.S.
- Died: April 12, 2012 (aged 70) Memphis, Tennessee, U.S.
- Formerly of: Memphis Horns

Andrew Love (November 21, 1941 – April 12, 2012) was an American saxophone player based in Memphis, Tennessee, best known for being a member of the Memphis Horns.

== Career ==
Love was born in Memphis, Tennessee, and began his interest in music at the Baptist church where his father was pastor. His music education continued in high school and at Langston University in Oklahoma. He returned to Memphis in 1965 and began session work at Stax Records where he teamed up with trumpet player Wayne Jackson. The two created the signature horn sound at Stax on hit records by Otis Redding, Sam & Dave and others.

After recording numerous tracks at Stax, he and Jackson incorporated themselves into the Memphis Horns and began freelancing. Love and Jackson recorded at sessions for such artists as Neil Diamond, Elvis Presley and Dusty Springfield. The duo also toured with the Doobie Brothers, Jimmy Buffett, Robert Cray and numerous other performers.

In 2002, Love was diagnosed with Alzheimer's disease which forced his retirement the following year and his eventual death in 2012 at age 70.

Al Bell, co-owner of Stax Records, said, "I love saxophone players, and I have many saxophone players I admire and hold in high esteem. But I have never heard a saxophone player who affects and penetrates me like Andrew Love. It was the spirit in him, and you could feel it in the music. He could arouse your deepest emotions, but he would do it gently, softly. It was like he was making love to your soul."

== Discography ==
With Luther Allison

- Live in Chicago (Alligator, 1995 [1999])

With Otis Redding

- Pain in My Heart (Atco Records, 1964)
- The Great Otis Redding Sings Soul Ballads (Atco Records, 1965)
- Otis Blue: Otis Redding Sings Soul (Stax Records, 1965)
- The Soul Album (Stax Records, 1966)
- Complete & Unbelievable: The Otis Redding Dictionary of Soul (Stax Records, 1966)
- King & Queen (Stax Records, 1967)
- The Dock of the Bay (Stax Records, 1968)

With Lulu

- Melody Fair (Atco, 1970)

With Albert King

- Born Under a Bad Sign (Stax Records, 1967)

With David Porter

- Sweat & Love (Enterprise Records, 1974)

With Tony Joe White

- Tony Joe White (Warner Bros. Records, 1971)

With Jimmy Buffett

- Hot Water (MCA Records, 1988)

With Joe Cocker

- Cocker (EMI, 1986)

With Tom Rush

- Ladies Love Outlaws (Columbia Records, 1974)

With Bonnie Raitt

- Longing in Their Hearts (Capitol Records, 1994)

With Keith Richards

- Talk Is Cheap (Virgin Records, 1988)

With Tanya Tucker

- Should I Do It (MCA Records, 1981)

With Carly Simon

- Another Passenger (Elektra Records, 1976)

With José Feliciano

- Memphis Menu (RCA Victor, 1972)

With Billy Joel

- Storm Front (Columbia Records, 1989)

With Nicolette Larson

- Nicolette (Warner Bros. Records, 1978)

With Rufus Thomas

- Do the Funky Chicken (Stax Records, 1970)

With Shirley Brown

- Intimate Storm (Soundtown Records, 1984)

With Stephen Stills

- Stephen Stills 2 (Atlantic Records, 1971)

With Wilson Pickett

- In the Midnight Hour (Atlantic Records, 1965)
- The Exciting Wilson Pickett (Atlantic Records, 1966)
- The Sound of Wilson Pickett (Atlantic Records, 1967)
- Don't Knock My Love (Atlantic Records, 1971)

With Yvonne Elliman

- Rising Sun (RSO Records, 1975)

With Carla Thomas

- Love Means... (Stax Records, 1971)

With Aretha Franklin

- Aretha Now (Atlantic Records, 1968)
- Young, Gifted and Black (Atlantic Records, 1972)
- Hey Now Hey (The Other Side of the Sky) (Atlantic Records, 1973)
- With Everything I Feel in Me (Atlantic Records, 1974)

With William Bell

- The Soul of a Bell (Stax Records, 1967)

With John Prine

- Common Sense (Atlantic Records, 1975)

With James Taylor

- Mud Slide Slim and the Blue Horizon (Warner Bros. Records, 1971)

With Eddie Floyd

- Knock on Wood (Stax Records, 1967)

With B.B. King

- To Know You Is to Love You (ABC Records, 1973)
- Friends (ABC Records, 1974)

With The Doobie Brothers

- What Were Once Vices Are Now Habits (Warner Bros. Records, 1974)
- Takin' It to the Streets (Warner Bros. Records, 1976)
- Minute by Minute (Warner Bros. Records, 1978)
- Cycles (Capitol Records, 1989)

With Steve Cropper

- Playin' My Thang (MCA Records, 1981)
