= Wayne Jackson (musician) =

American musician (1941–2016)

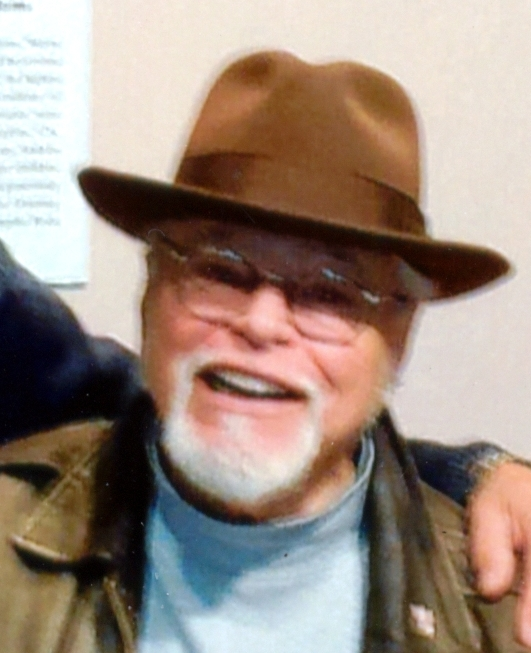
- Wayne Jackson, 2013

Background information
- Born: Wayne Lamar Jackson; November 24, 1941; West Memphis, Arkansas, U.S.
- Died: June 21, 2016 (aged 74) Memphis, Tennessee, U.S.
- Genres: Rhythm & blues, soul
- Occupations: Musician, songwriter, producer
- Instruments: Trumpet, trombone, French Horn
- Years active: 1961–2016
- Label: Stax
- Formerly of: Memphis Horns The Mar-Keys

Wayne Lamar Jackson (November 24, 1941 – June 21, 2016) was an American soul and R&B musician, playing the trumpet in The Mar-Keys, in the house band at Stax Records and later as one of The Memphis Horns, described as "arguably the greatest soul horn section ever".

Jackson was born in West Memphis, Arkansas, just a few days apart from his musical partner Andrew Love with whom he created the signature horn sound at Stax on hit records by Otis Redding, Sam & Dave, and others. Jackson was also the voice on the Mar-Keys singular hit "Last Night", due in part, to his proximity to the microphone.

After the years recording at Stax, they incorporated themselves into The Memphis Horns and began freelancing, recording on sessions for such artists as Neil Diamond, Elvis Presley, Al Green, and Dusty Springfield. The duo also toured with The Doobie Brothers, Jimmy Buffett, Robert Cray, and numerous other performers.

As a key member of the Stax house band, Jackson played on enduring classics like Otis Redding's "Try a Little Tenderness" and Aretha Franklin's "Respect." He later noted that the studio rarely provided written horn charts, leaving it to the musicians to create their parts on the spot. This spontaneous, collaborative process became essential to forging the signature Memphis soul sound.

After officially incorporating as The Memphis Horns with saxophonist Andrew Love in 1969, Jackson began a prolific freelance career. He moved to Nashville in 1978, toured with country music star Marty Robbins, and broke new ground as the first horn player invited to perform at the Grand Ole Opry. In 1986, his career was reintroduced to a global audience when he was featured prominently on Peter Gabriel's hit single, "Sledgehammer.".

In 2012, the Memphis Horns received a Grammy Lifetime Achievement Award for outstanding artistic significance in music.

Jackson died on June 21, 2016, at Methodist University Hospital in Memphis of congestive heart failure. His death came after several years of failing health during which he still maintained an active schedule earning an income by giving personalized guided tours at the Stax Museum of American Soul Music. He was 74.

== Discography ==
With Alabama

- When It All Goes South (RCA Records, 2001)

With Luther Allison

- Live in Chicago (Alligator, 1999)

With William Bell

- The Soul of a Bell (Stax Records, 1967)
- Bound to Happen (Stax Records, 1969)
- Relating (Stax Records, 1974)

With Frank Black

- Fast Man Raider Man (Cooking Vinyl, 2006)

With Jimmy Buffett

- Floridays (MCA Records, 1986)
- Hot Water (MCA Records, 1988)

With Joe Cocker

- Luxury You Can Afford (Asylum Records, 1978)

With Rita Coolidge

- Letting You Go With Love (Victor, 1997)
- Thinkin' About You (404 Music Group, 1998)

With Rodney Crowell

- Street Language (Columbia Records, 1986)

With The Doobie Brothers

- What Were Once Vices Are Now Habits (Warner Bros. Records, 1974)
- Takin' It to the Streets (Warner Bros. Records, 1976)
- Cycles (Capitol Records, 1989)

With Yvonne Elliman

- Rising Sun (RSO Records, 1975)

With José Feliciano

- Memphis Menu (RCA Victor, 1972)

With Firefall

- Luna Sea (Atlantic, 1977)

With Eddie Floyd

- Knock on Wood (Stax Records, 1967)

With Aretha Franklin

- Aretha Now (Atlantic Records, 1968)
- Young, Gifted and Black (Atlantic Records, 1972)
- Hey Now Hey (The Other Side of the Sky) (Atlantic Records, 1973)
- With Everything I Feel in Me (Atlantic Records, 1974)

With Peter Gabriel

- So (Geffen, 1986)
- Us (Real World Records, 1992)

With Al Green

- Don't Look Back (BMG, 1993)
- Your Heart's in Good Hands (MCA Records, 1995)

With Colin James

- Sudden Stop (Virgin Records, 1990)

With Billy Joel

- Storm Front (Columbia Records, 1989)
- Uncovered (Swamp Records, 2006)

With Albert King

- Born Under a Bad Sign (Stax Records, 1967)

With B. B. King

- To Know You Is to Love You (ABC Records, 1973)
- Friends (ABC Records, 1974)

With Mark Knopfler

- Sailing to Philadelphia (Mercury Records, 2000)

With Mark Knopfler and Emmylou Harris

- All the Roadrunning (Mercury Records, 2006)

With Nicolette Larson

- In the Nick of Time (Warner Bros. Records, 1979)

With Lulu

- Melody Fair (Atco, 1970)

With Dan Penn

- Do Right Man (Sire Records, 1994)
- Blue Nite Lounge (Dandy Records, 2000)

With Wilson Pickett

- In the Midnight Hour (Atlantic Records, 1965)
- The Exciting Wilson Pickett (Atlantic Records, 1966)
- The Sound of Wilson Pickett (Atlantic Records, 1967)
- Don't Knock My Love (Atlantic Records, 1971)

With David Porter

- Victim of the Joke? An Opera (Enterprise Records, 1971)

With John Prine

- Common Sense (Atlantic Records, 1975)

With Bonnie Raitt

- Longing in Their Hearts (Capitol Records, 1994)

With Otis Redding

- Pain in My Heart (Atco Records, 1964)
- The Great Otis Redding Sings Soul Ballads (Atco Records, 1965)
- Otis Blue/Otis Redding Sings Soul (Stax Records, 1965)
- The Soul Album (Stax Records, 1966)
- Complete & Unbelievable: The Otis Redding Dictionary of Soul (Stax Records, 1966)
- King & Queen (Stax Records, 1967)
- The Dock of the Bay (Stax Records, 1968)

With Johnny Rivers

- The Memphis Sun Recordings (Soul City, 1998)

With Tom Rush

- Ladies Love Outlaws (Columbia Records, 1974)

With Broderick Smith

- Suitcase (Mushroom Records, 1992)

With Pops Staples

- Peace to the Neighborhood (Point Blank Records, 1992)

With Rod Stewart

- Soulbook (J Records, 2009)

With Stephen Stills

- Stephen Stills 2 (Atlantic Records, 1971)

With Sting

- Mercury Falling (A&M Records, 1996)

With James Taylor

- Mud Slide Slim and the Blue Horizon (Warner Bros. Records, 1971)

With Carla Thomas

- Love Means... (Stax Records, 1971)

With Rob Thomas

- Someday (Atlantic Records, 2010)

With Rufus Thomas

- Do the Funky Chicken (Stax Records, 1970)
- Swing Out with Rufus Thomas (High Stacks Records, 2000)

With The Manhattan Transfer

- Jukin' (Capitol, 1971)

With Tony Joe White

- Tony Joe White (Warner Bros. Records, 1971)

With Steve Winwood

- Roll with It (Virgin Records, 1988)

With Neil Young

- Prairie Wind (Reprise Records, 2005)

With Paul Young

- The Crossing (Columbia Records, 1993)
