= Otis Redding =

American singer and songwriter (1941–1967)

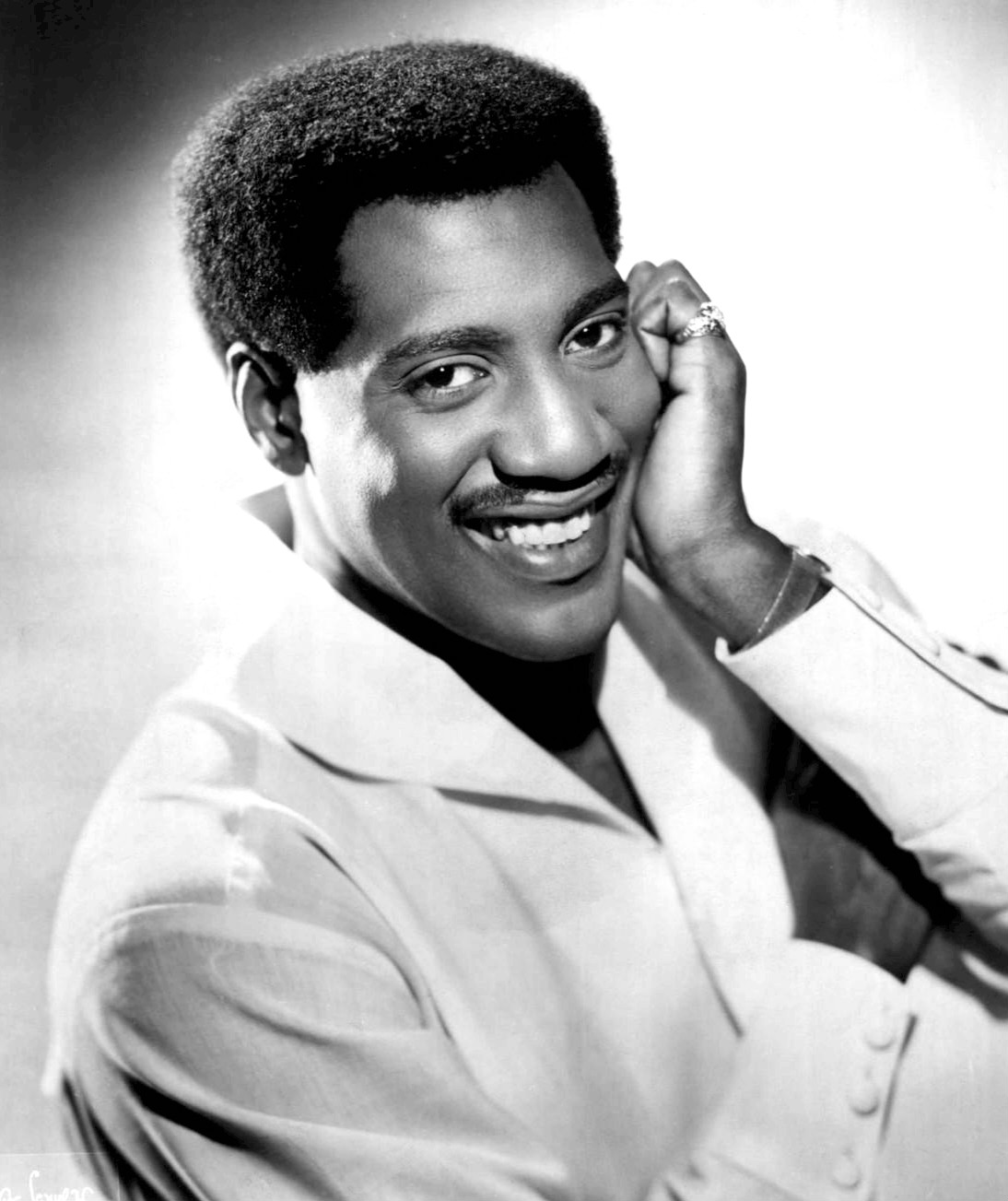
- Redding in 1967
- Born: Otis Ray Redding Jr. September 9, 1941; Dawson, Georgia, U.S.
- Died: December 10, 1967 (aged 26); Lake Monona, near Madison, Wisconsin, U.S.
- Cause of death: Plane crash into Lake Monona
- Resting place: Round Oak, Georgia
- Other names: The Big O; The Mad Man from Macon; Rockhouse Redding; The King of Soul
- Occupations: Singer; songwriter
- Spouse: Zelma Atwood (m. 1961)
- Children: 3
- Musical career
- Genres: Soul; R&B; Southern soul
- Instruments: Vocals; guitar
- Works: Discography
- Years active: 1958–1967
- Labels: Confederate Records; Stax; Volt; Atco; Rhino; Sundazed
- Website: otisredding.com

Otis Ray Redding Jr. (September 9, 1941 – December 10, 1967) was an American singer and songwriter. He is regarded as one of the greatest singers in the history of American popular music and an influential artist in soul music and rhythm and blues. Nicknamed the "King of Soul", Redding's style of singing drew inspiration from the gospel music that preceded the genre. His vocal style influenced many other soul artists of the 1960s.

Redding was born in Dawson, Georgia, and his family soon moved to Macon. He dropped out of high school at age 15 to support his family, working with Little Richard's backing band, the Upsetters, and performing in talent shows at Macon's historic Douglass Theatre. In 1958, Redding joined Johnny Jenkins' band, the Pinetoppers, with whom he toured the Southern states as a singer and driver. An unscheduled appearance at a Stax Records recording session led to a contract and Redding's first hit single, "These Arms of Mine", in 1962.

Stax released Redding's debut album, Pain in My Heart, two years later. Initially popular mainly with African Americans, Redding later reached a wider American pop music audience. Along with his group, he first played small shows in the American South. Redding later performed at the popular Los Angeles night club Whisky a Go Go and toured Europe, performing in London, Paris and other major cities. In June 1967, he performed at the Monterey Pop Festival.

Shortly before his death in a plane crash, Redding wrote and recorded "(Sittin' On) The Dock of the Bay" with Steve Cropper. Released in January 1968, the song became the first posthumous number-one record on both the Billboard Hot 100 and R&B charts. The album The Dock of the Bay was the first posthumous album to reach number one on the UK Albums Chart. Redding's premature death devastated Stax. Already on the verge of bankruptcy, the label soon discovered that the Atco division of Atlantic Records owned the rights to his entire song catalog.

Redding received many posthumous accolades, including two Grammy Awards, the Grammy Lifetime Achievement Award and induction into the Rock and Roll Hall of Fame, the Black Music & Entertainment Walk of Fame, and the Songwriters Hall of Fame. In addition to "(Sittin' On) The Dock of the Bay", some of his best-known songs include his self-penned "Respect" (1965), which later became more widely associated with Aretha Franklin's cover, and Redding's rendition of "Try a Little Tenderness" (1966).

== Early life ==
Redding was born in Dawson, Georgia, on September 9, 1941, the fourth of six children, and the first son of Otis Redding Sr. and Fannie Roseman. Otis Sr. was a sharecropper and then worked at Robins Air Force Base, near Macon, and occasionally preached in local churches. When Redding was three, the family moved to Tindall Heights, a predominantly African-American public housing project in Macon. At an early age, he sang in the Vineville Baptist Church choir and learned guitar and piano. From age 10, Redding took drum and singing lessons. At Ballard-Hudson High School, he sang in the school band. Every Sunday, Redding earned $6 by performing gospel songs for Macon radio station WIBB, and he won the $5 prize in a teen talent show for 15 consecutive weeks. Redding's passion was singing, and he often cited Little Richard and Sam Cooke as influences. Redding said that he "would not be here" without Little Richard and that he "entered the music business because of Richard – he is my inspiration. I used to sing like Little Richard, his rock 'n' roll stuff ... My present music has a lot of him in it."

At age 15, Redding left school to help financially support his family; his father had contracted tuberculosis and was often hospitalized, leaving his mother as the family's primary income earner. Redding worked as a well digger, a gasoline station attendant, and occasionally a musician. Pianist Gladys Williams, a locally well-known musician in Macon and another who inspired Redding, often performed at the Hillview Springs Social Club, and Redding sometimes played piano with her band there. Williams hosted Sunday talent shows, which Redding attended with two friends, singers Little Willie Jones and Eddie Ross.

Redding's breakthrough came in 1958 on disc jockey Hamp Swain's "The Teenage Party", a talent contest at the local Roxy and Douglass Theatres. Johnny Jenkins, a locally prominent guitarist, was in the audience and, finding Redding's backing band lacking in musical skills, offered to accompany him. Redding sang Little Richard's "Heebie Jeebies". The combination enabled Redding to win Swain's talent contest for 15 consecutive weeks; the cash prize was $5 (US$56 in 2025 dollars). Jenkins later worked as lead guitarist and played with Redding during several later gigs. Redding was soon invited to replace Willie Jones as frontman of Pat T. Cake and the Mighty Panthers, featuring Johnny Jenkins. Redding was then hired by the Upsetters when Little Richard abandoned rock and roll in favor of gospel music. Redding was well paid, making about $25 per gig (US$279 in 2025 dollars), but did not stay long. In mid-1960, Otis moved to Los Angeles with his sister, Deborah, while his wife, Zelma, and their children stayed in Macon, Georgia. In Los Angeles, Redding recorded his first songs, including "Tuff Enuff" written by James McEachin, "She's All Right", written with McEachin, and two Redding wrote alone, called "I'm Gettin' Hip" and "Gamma Lamma" (which he recorded as a single in 1961, under the title "Shout Bamalama").

== Career ==
=== Early career ===
A member of Pat T. Cake and the Mighty Panthers, Redding toured the southern United States on the Chitlin' Circuit, a string of venues that were hospitable to African-American entertainers during the era of racial segregation, which lasted into the early 1960s. Johnny Jenkins left the band to become the featured artist with the Pinetoppers. Around this time, Redding met Phil Walden, the future founder of the recording company Phil Walden and Associates, and later Bobby Smith, who ran the small label Confederate Records. He signed with Confederate and recorded a single, "Shout Bamalama" (a rewrite of "Gamma Lamma") and "Fat Girl", together with his band Otis and the Shooters. Around this time he and the Pinetoppers attended a "Battle of the Bands" show in Lakeside Park. Wayne Cochran, the only solo artist signed to Confederate, became the Pinetoppers' bassist.

When Walden started to look for a record label for Jenkins, Atlantic Records representative Joe Galkin showed interest, and around 1962, sent him to the Stax studio in Memphis. Redding drove Jenkins to the session, as the latter did not have a driver's license. The session with Jenkins, backed by Booker T. & the M.G.'s, was unproductive and ended early; Redding was allowed to perform two songs. The first was "Hey Hey Baby", which studio chief Jim Stewart thought sounded too much like Little Richard. The second was "These Arms of Mine", featuring Jenkins on guitar and Steve Cropper on piano. Stewart later praised Redding's performance, saying, "Everybody was fixin' to go home, but Joe Galkin insisted we give Otis a listen. There was something different about [the ballad]. He really poured his soul into it." Stewart signed Redding and released "These Arms of Mine", with "Hey Hey Baby" on the B-side. The single was released by Volt in October 1962 and charted in March the following year. It became one of his most successful songs, selling more than 800,000 copies.

=== Apollo Theater and Otis Blue ===
"These Arms of Mine" and other songs from the 1962–1963 sessions were included on Redding's debut album, Pain in My Heart. "That's What My Heart Needs" and "Mary's Little Lamb" were recorded in June 1963. The latter is the only Redding track with both background singing and brass. It became his worst-selling single. The title track, recorded in September 1963, sparked copyright issues, as it sounded like Irma Thomas's "Ruler of My Heart". Despite this, Pain in My Heart was released in March 1964, with the single peaking at number 11 on the R&B chart, number 61 on the Billboard Hot 100, and the album at number 103 on the Billboard 200.

In November 1963, Redding, accompanied by his brother Rodgers and an associate, former boxer Sylvester Huckaby (a childhood friend of Redding's), traveled to New York to perform at the Apollo Theater for the recording of a live album for Atlantic Records. Redding and his band were paid $400 per week (US$4,207 in 2025 dollars) but had to pay $450 (US$4,732 in 2025 dollars) for sheet music for the house band, led by King Curtis, which left them in financial difficulty. The trio asked Walden for money. Huckaby's description of their circumstances living in the "big old raggedy" Hotel Theresa is quoted by Peter Guralnick in his 1999 book Sweet Soul Music. He noted meeting Muhammad Ali and other celebrities. Ben E. King, who was the headliner at the Apollo when Redding performed there, gave him $100 (US$1,052 in 2025 dollars) when he learned about Redding's financial situation. The resulting album featured King, the Coasters, Doris Troy, Rufus Thomas, the Falcons and Redding. Around this time Walden and Rodgers were drafted by the army; Walden's younger brother Alan joined Redding on tour, while Earl "Speedo" Simms replaced Rodgers as Redding's road manager.

Most of Redding's songs after "Security", from his first album, had a slow tempo. Disc jockey A. C. Moohah Williams accordingly labeled him "Mr. Pitiful", and subsequently, Cropper and Redding wrote the eponymous song. That and top 100 singles "Chained and Bound", "Come to Me" and "That's How Strong My Love Is" were included on Redding's second studio album, The Great Otis Redding Sings Soul Ballads, released in March 1965. Jenkins began working independently from the group out of fear Galkin, Walden and Cropper would plagiarize his playing style, and so Cropper became Redding's leading guitarist. Around 1965, Redding co-wrote "I've Been Loving You Too Long" with Jerry Butler, formerly the lead singer of the Impressions. That summer, Redding and the studio crew arranged new songs for his next album. Ten of the eleven songs were recorded in a 24-hour period on July 9 and 10 in Memphis. Two songs, "Ole Man Trouble" and "Respect", had been finished earlier, during the Otis Blue session. "Respect" and "I've Been Loving You" were later recut in stereo. The album, titled Otis Blue: Otis Redding Sings Soul, was released in September 1965. Otis Blue also includes Redding's much-loved cover of "A Change Is Gonna Come" in 1965.

=== Whisky a-Go-Go and "Try a Little Tenderness" ===
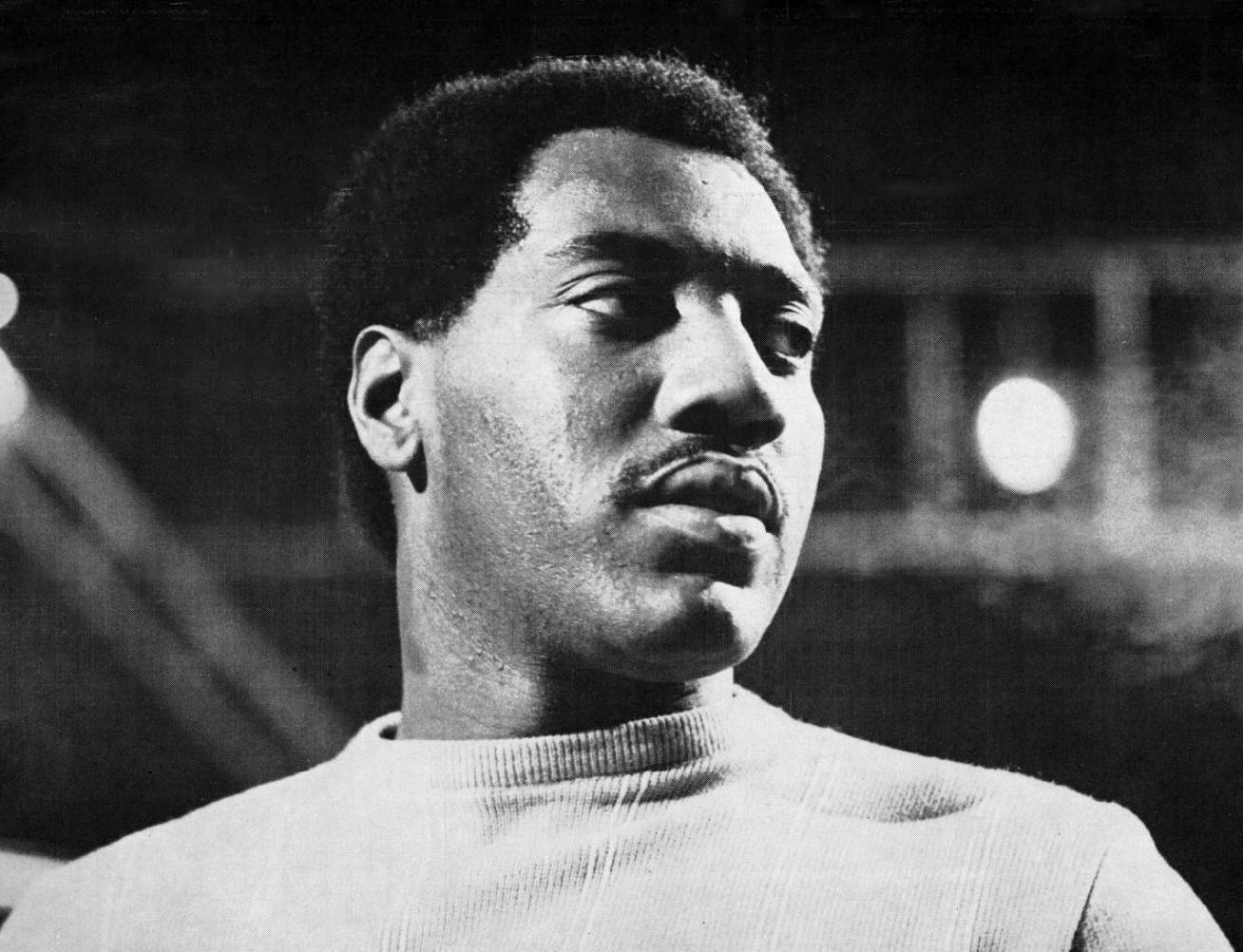
Redding in January 1967, from a trade ad for his single "Try a Little Tenderness".

Redding's success allowed him to buy a 300-acre (1.2 km^{2}) ranch in Georgia, which he called the "Big O Ranch". Stax was also doing well. Walden signed more musicians, including Percy Sledge, Johnnie Taylor, Clarence Carter and Eddie Floyd, and together with Redding, they founded two production companies. "Jotis Records" (derived from Joe Galkin and Otis) released four recordings, two by Arthur Conley and one by Billy Young and Loretta Williams. The other was named Redwal Music (derived from Redding and Walden), which was shut down shortly after its creation. Since African Americans still formed the majority of fans, Redding chose to perform at Whisky a Go Go on the Sunset Strip in Los Angeles. Redding was one of the first soul artists to perform for rock audiences in the western United States. His performance received critical acclaim, including positive press in the Los Angeles Times, and he penetrated mainstream popular culture. Bob Dylan attended the performance and offered Redding an altered version of one of his songs, "Just Like a Woman".

In late 1966, Redding returned to the Stax studio and recorded several tracks, including "Try a Little Tenderness", written by Jimmy Campbell, Reg Connelly and Harry M. Woods in 1932. This song had previously been recorded by Bing Crosby and Frank Sinatra, and the publishers unsuccessfully tried to stop Redding from recording the song from a "negro perspective". Today often considered his signature song, Jim Stewart reckoned: "If there's one song, one performance that really sort of sums up Otis and what he's about, it's 'Try a Little Tenderness'. That one performance is so special and so unique that it expresses who he is." On this version Redding was backed by Booker T. & the M.G.'s, while staff producer Isaac Hayes worked on the arrangement. "Try a Little Tenderness" was included on Redding's next album, Complete & Unbelievable: The Otis Redding Dictionary of Soul. The song and the album were critically and commercially successful—the former peaked at number 25 on the Billboard Hot 100 chart and at number 4 on the R&B chart. Retrospectively, his rendition has been named the 204th greatest song of all time by Rolling Stone in December 2004.

The spring of 1966 marked the first time that Stax booked concerts for its artists. The majority of the group arrived in London on March 13, but Redding had flown in days earlier for interviews, such as at The Eamonn Andrews Show. When the crew arrived in London, the Beatles sent a limousine to pick them up. Booking agent Bill Graham proposed that Redding play at the Fillmore Auditorium in late 1966. The gig was commercially and critically successful, paying Redding around $800 to $1000 (US$9,923 in 2025 dollars) a night. It prompted Graham to remark afterwards: "That was the best gig I ever put on in my entire life." Redding began touring Europe six months later.

=== Carla Thomas ===
In March 1967, Stax released King & Queen, an album of duets between Redding and Carla Thomas, which became a certified gold record. It was Jim Stewart's idea to produce a duet album, as he expected that "[Redding's] rawness and [Thomas's] sophistication would work". The album was recorded in January 1967, while Thomas was earning her M.A. in English at Howard University. Six out of ten songs were cut during their joint session; the rest were overdubbed by Redding in the days following, because of his concert obligations. Three singles were lifted from the album: "Tramp" was released in April, followed by "Knock on Wood" and "Lovey Dovey". All three reached at least the top 60 on both the R&B and Pop charts. The album charted at number 5 and 36 on the Billboard Pop and R&B charts, respectively.

Redding returned to Europe to perform at the Paris Olympia. The live album Otis Redding: Live in Europe was released three months later, featuring this and other live performances in London and Stockholm, Sweden. His decision to take his protege Conley (whom Redding and Walden had contracted directly to Atco/Atlantic Records rather than to Stax/Volt) on the tour, instead of more established Stax/Volt artists such as Rufus Thomas and William Bell, produced negative reactions.

=== Monterey Pop ===
In 1967, Redding performed at the influential Monterey Pop Festival as the closing act on Saturday night, the second day of the festival. He was invited through the efforts of promoter Jerry Wexler. Until that point, Redding was still performing mainly for black audiences. At the time, he "had not been considered a commercially viable player in the mainstream white American market". However, after delivering one of the most electric performances of the night, and having been the act to most involve the audience, "his performance at Monterey Pop was therefore a natural progression from local to national acclaim,...the decisive turning-point in Otis Redding's career." His act included his own song "Respect" and a version of the Rolling Stones' "Satisfaction". Redding and his backing band (Booker T. & the M.G.'s with the Mar-Keys horn section) opened with Cooke's "Shake", after which he delivered an impromptu speech, asking the audience if they were the "love crowd" and looking for a big response. The ballad "I've Been Loving You" followed, and the last song was "Try a Little Tenderness", including an additional chorus. "I got to go, y'all, I don't wanna go," said Redding, and left the stage of his last major concert. According to Booker T. Jones, "I think we did one of our best shows, Otis and the MG's. That we were included in that was also something of a phenomenon. ... They were accepting us and that was one of the things that really moved Otis. He was happy to be included and it brought him a new audience. It was greatly expanded in Monterey." According to Sweet Soul Music, musicians such as Brian Jones and Jimi Hendrix were captivated by his performance; Robert Christgau wrote in Esquire, "The Love Crowd screamed one's mind to the heavens."

Before Monterey, Redding wanted to record with Conley, but Stax was against the idea. The two moved from Memphis to Macon to continue writing. The result was "Sweet Soul Music" (based on Cooke's "Yeah Man"), which peaked at number 2 on the Billboard Hot 100. By that time, Redding had developed polyps on his larynx, which he tried to treat with tea and lemon or honey. He was hospitalized in September 1967 at Mount Sinai Hospital in New York to undergo surgery.

=== "Dock of the Bay" ===
In early December 1967, Redding again recorded at Stax. One new song was "(Sittin' On) The Dock of the Bay", which was written with Cropper. Redding was inspired by the Beatles album Sgt. Pepper's Lonely Hearts Club Band and tried to create a similar sound, against the label's wishes. His wife Zelma disliked its atypical melody. The Stax crew were also dissatisfied with the new sound; Stewart thought that it was not R&B, while bassist Donald "Duck" Dunn feared it would damage Stax's reputation. However, Redding wanted to expand his musical style and thought it was his best song, correctly believing it would top the charts. He whistled at the end, either forgetting Cropper's "fadeout rap" or paraphrasing it intentionally.

== Personal life ==
Redding, who was 6 feet 1 inch (1.85 m) tall and weighed 220 pounds (100 kg), was an athletic family man who loved hunting and American football. He was active in philanthropic projects. Redding also had a keen interest in supporting Black youth; at the time of his death, Redding had been planning to construct a summer camp for disadvantaged children.

=== Marriage and children ===
At age 18, Redding met 17-year-old Zelma Atwood at a local event, "The Teenage Party". Approximately a year later, she gave birth to their son Dexter in the summer of 1960 and married Redding in August 1961. In mid-1960, Otis moved to Los Angeles with his sister Deborah while Zelma and Dexter stayed in Macon. Zelma and Otis welcomed two more children, Karla and Otis III (December 17, 1964 – April 18, 2023). A fourth child, Demetria, was adopted by Zelma after Otis died. Otis III, Dexter, and cousin Mark Lockett later founded The Reddings, a band managed by Zelma. She also maintained or worked at the janitorial service Maids Over Macon, several nightclubs, and booking agencies.

=== Wealth ===
Redding's music made him wealthy. According to several advertisements, he had around 200 suits and 400 pairs of shoes, and Redding earned about $35,000 per week for his concerts. He spent about $125,000 in the "Big O Ranch". As the owner of Otis Redding Enterprises, his performances, music publishing ventures and royalties from record sales earned Redding more than a million dollars in 1967 alone. That year, one columnist said, "he sold more records than Frank Sinatra and Dean Martin combined." After the release of Otis Blue, Redding became a "catalogue" artist, meaning that his albums were not immediate blockbusters, but rather sold steadily over time.

== Death ==
By 1967, the band was traveling to performances in Redding's Beechcraft H18 airplane. On December 9, they appeared on the Upbeat television show produced in Cleveland. They played three concerts in two nights at a club called Leo's Casino. Joe Eszterhas conducted one of the last interviews with Redding, the day before his plane crash the two, "began speaking around midnight after the show at Leo's Casino until 3:30AM in the morning. We did a lot of beer, a lot of Jim Beam, we smoked a lot of really powerful Thai stuff." after which Redding hugged him and called him an affectionate racial epithet. After a phone call with his wife and children, Redding's next stop was Madison, Wisconsin; the next day, Sunday, December 10, they were to play at the Factory nightclub, near the University of Wisconsin.

Although the weather was poor, with heavy rain and fog, and despite warnings, the plane took off. Four miles (6.5 km) from their destination at Truax Field in Madison, pilot Richard Fraser radioed for permission to land. Shortly thereafter, the plane crashed into Lake Monona. Bar-Kays member Ben Cauley, the accident's only survivor, was sleeping shortly before the accident. He awoke just before impact to see bandmate Phalon Jones look out a window and exclaim, "Oh, no!" Cauley said that the last thing he remembered before the crash was unbuckling his seat belt. Cauley then found himself in frigid water, grasping a seat cushion to keep afloat. As a non-swimmer, he was unable to rescue the others. The cause of the crash was never determined. Besides Redding, the other victims of the crash were four members of the Bar-Kays—guitarist Jimmie King, tenor saxophonist Phalon Jones, organist Ronnie Caldwell, and drummer Carl Cunningham—their valet, Matthew Kelly, and the pilot Fraser.

Redding's body was recovered the next day when the lake was searched. The family postponed the funeral from December 15 to December 18, so that more people could attend, and the service took place at the City Auditorium in Macon. More than 6,500 people came to the funeral, overflowing the 4,500-seat hall. Redding was entombed at his ranch in Round Oak, about 20 miles (30 km) north of Macon. Jerry Wexler delivered the eulogy. Redding died just three days after re-recording "(Sittin' On) The Dock of the Bay" and was survived by Zelma and four children: Otis III, Dexter, Demetria, and Karla. In August 1997, a memorial plaque was placed on the lakeside deck of the Madison convention center, Monona Terrace.

=== Posthumous releases and proposed recordings and television appearances ===
"(Sittin' On) The Dock of the Bay" was released in January 1968. It became Redding's only single to reach number one on the Billboard Hot 100 and the first posthumous number-one single in U.S. chart history. It sold approximately four million copies worldwide and received more than eight million airplays. The album The Dock of the Bay was the first posthumous album to reach the top spot on the UK Albums Chart.

Shortly after Redding's death, Atlantic Records, the distributor of the Stax/Volt releases, was purchased by Warner Bros. Stax was required to renegotiate its distribution deal and was surprised to learn that Atlantic actually owned the entire Stax/Volt catalog. Stax was unable to regain the rights to its recordings and severed its Atlantic relationship. Atlantic also held the rights to all unreleased Otis Redding masters. It had enough material for three studio albums—The Immortal Otis Redding (1968), Love Man (1969), and Tell the Truth (1970)—all issued on its Atco Records label. A number of successful singles emerged from these LPs, among them "Amen" (1968), "Hard to Handle" (1968), "I've Got Dreams to Remember" (1968), "Love Man" (1969), and "Look at That Girl" (1969). Singles were also lifted from two live Atlantic-issued Redding albums, In Person at the Whisky a Go Go, recorded in 1966 and issued in 1968 on Atco, and Historic Performances Recorded at the Monterey International Pop Festival, a Reprise Records release featuring some of the live performances at the festival by the Jimi Hendrix Experience on side one and Redding on side two.

Redding had at least two television appearances booked for 1968; one on The Ed Sullivan Show and the other on The Smothers Brothers Comedy Hour.

In September 2007, the first official DVD anthology of Redding's live performances was released by Concord Music Group, then owners of the Stax catalog. Dreams to Remember: The Legacy of Otis Redding featured 16 full-length performances and 40 minutes of new interviews documenting his life and career. On May 18, 2010, Stax Records released a two-disc recording of three complete sets from his Whisky a Go Go date in April 1966. All seven sets from his three-day residency at the venue were released as Live at the Whisky a Go Go: The Complete Recordings in 2016, a 6-CD box set that won a Grammy Award for Best Album Notes.

Carla Thomas claimed that the pair had planned to record another duet album in December the same year, but Phil Walden denied this. Redding had proposed to record an album featuring cut and rearranged songs in different tempos; for example, ballads would be uptempo and vice versa. Another suggestion was to record an album entirely consisting of country standards.

In 2005, on the outro track to Kanye West's sophomore album Late Registration titled "Gone", he sampled the intro to Redding's 1965 track It's Too Late. In 2011, West and Jay-Z released "Otis" as a single from their collaborative album, Watch the Throne. Redding was credited as a feature on the song. The song was produced by West who built it off of a sample of Redding's version of "Try a Little Tenderness".

== Musicianship ==
=== Style ===
Early on, Redding copied the rock and soul style of his role model Little Richard. Redding was also influenced by soul musicians such as Sam Cooke, in particular, the live album Sam Cooke at the Copa, later exploring other popular genres. He studied the recordings of the Beatles and Bob Dylan. Redding's song "Hard to Handle" has elements of rock and roll and influences of Eric Clapton and Jimi Hendrix. Most of Redding's songs were categorized as Southern soul and Memphis soul.

Redding's hallmark was his raw voice and ability to convey strong emotion. Richie Unterberger of AllMusic noted his "hoarse, gritty vocals, brassy arrangements, an emotional way with both party tunes and aching ballads." In the book Rock and Roll: An Introduction, authors Michael Campbell and James Brody suggested that "Redding's singing calls to mind a fervent black preacher. Especially in up-tempo numbers, his singing is more than impassioned speech but less than singing with precise pitch." According to the book, "Redding finds a rough midpoint between impassioned oratory and conventional singing. His delivery overflows with emotion" in his song "I Can't Turn You Loose". Booker T. Jones described Redding's singing as energetic and emotional but said that his vocal range was limited, reaching neither low nor high notes. Peter Buckley, in The Rough Guide to Rock, describes his "gruff voice, which combined Sam Cooke's phrasing with a brawnier delivery" and later suggested he "could testify like a hell-bent preacher, croon like a tender lover or get down and dirty with a bluesy yawp".

Redding received advice from Rufus Thomas about his clumsy stage appearance. Jerry Wexler said Redding "didn't know how to move", and stood still, moving only his upper body, although he acknowledged that Redding was well received by audiences for his strong message. Guralnick described Redding's painful vulnerability in Sweet Soul Music, as an attractive one for the audience, but not for his friends and partners. His early shyness was well known.

=== Songwriting ===
In his early career, Redding mostly covered songs from popular artists, such as Little Richard, Sam Cooke and Solomon Burke. Around the mid-1960s, Redding began writing his own songs—always taking along his cheap red acoustic guitar—and sometimes asked for Stax members' opinion of his lyrics. He often worked on lyrics with other musicians, such as Simms, Rodgers, Huckaby, Phil Walden, and Steve Cropper. During his recovery from his throat operation, Redding wrote about 30 songs in two weeks. Redding was the sole copyright holder on all of his songs.

In "(Sittin' On) The Dock of the Bay", Redding abandoned familiar romantic themes for "sad, wistful introspections, amplified by unforgettable descending guitar riffs by Cropper". The website of the Songwriters Hall of Fame noted that the song "was a kind of brooding, dark voicing of despair, ('I've got nothin' to live for/Look like nothin's gonna come my way')" although "his music, in general, was exultant and joyful." According to journalist Ruth Robinson, author of the liner notes for the 1993 box set, "It is currently a revisionist theory to equate soul with the darker side of man's musical expression, blues. That fanner of the flame of 'Trouble's got a hold on me' music, might well be the father of the form if it is, the glorified exaltation found in church on any Sunday morning is its mother." The Songwriters Hall of Fame website adds that "glorified exaltation indeed was an apt description of Otis Redding's songwriting and singing style." Booker T. Jones compared Redding with Leonard Bernstein, stating: "He was the same type person. He was a leader. He'd just lead with his arms and his body and his fingers."

Redding favored short and simple lyrics; when asked whether he intended to cover Dylan's "Just Like a Woman", he responded that the lyrics contained "too much text". Furthermore, he stated in an interview:

Basically, I like any music that remains simple and I feel this is the formula that makes "soul music" successful. When any music form becomes cluttered and/or complicated you lose the average listener's ear. There is nothing more beautiful than a simple blues tune. There is beauty in simplicity whether you are talking about architecture, art or music.

Redding also authored his (sometimes difficult) recordings' horn arrangements, humming to show the players what he had in mind. The recording of "Fa-Fa-Fa-Fa-Fa (Sad Song)" captures his habit of humming with the horn section.

== Legacy ==
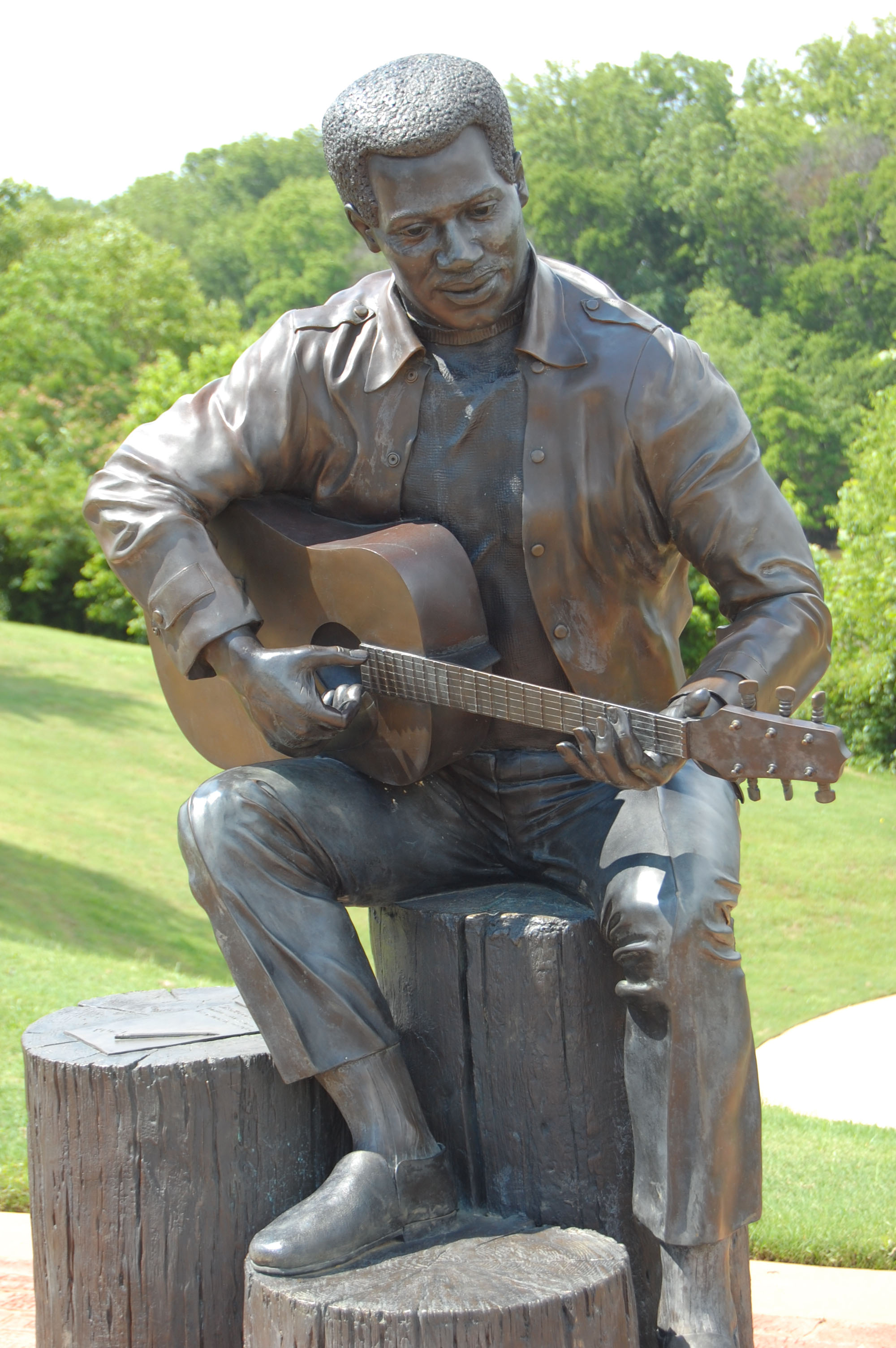
"Otis Redding Sittin' on the Dock of the Bay", statue in Gateway Park by Bradley Cooley and Bradley Cooley, Jr of Bronze By Cooley, 2003

Redding has been called the "King of Soul", an honorific also given to James Brown and Sam Cooke. He remains one of the genre's most recognized artists. Redding's lean and powerful style exemplified the Stax sound; he was said to be "the heart and soul of Stax", while artists such as Al Jackson, Dunn and Cropper helped to expand its structure. Redding's open-throated singing, the tremolo/vibrato, the manic, electrifying stage performances, and perceived honesty were particular hallmarks, along with the use of interjections (such as "gotta, gotta, gotta"), some of which came from Cooke. Producer Stewart thought the "begging singing" was stress-induced and enhanced by Redding's shyness. His LP releases earned him recognition from music critic Robert Christgau as "one of soul's few reliable long-form artists"; Christgau deems Otis Blue his "first great album", and Mat Snow regards it as an early indication of the album era, in which the LP would overtake singles in commercial and artistic importance.

Along with soul and R&B, Redding's contributions to rock music have been noted by music scholars, particularly the "black rock" performed by his contemporaries Wilson Pickett and Sly and the Family Stone. "His musical palette, a cosmic alloy of gospel and blues, hammered into a gritty but elegant template by both black and white musicians, remodeled soul and rock and anchored the most infectious native music America had heard since the big bands", wrote biographer Mark Ribowsky. Artists from many genres have named Redding as a musical influence. George Harrison called "Respect" an inspiration for "Drive My Car". The Rolling Stones also mentioned Redding as a major influence. Other artists influenced by Redding include Led Zeppelin, the Grateful Dead, Lynyrd Skynyrd, the Doors, and virtually every soul and R&B musician from the early years, such as Al Green, Etta James, William Bell, Aretha Franklin, Marvin Gaye and Conley. Janis Joplin was influenced by his singing style, according to Sam Andrew, a guitarist in her band Big Brother and the Holding Company. She stated that she learned "to push a song instead of just sliding over it" after hearing Redding.

The Bee Gees' Barry Gibb and Robin Gibb wrote the song "To Love Somebody" for Redding to record. He loved it, and he was going to "cut it", as Barry put it, on his return from his final concert. They dedicated the song to Redding's memory.

Redding's song "Try a Little Tenderness" was also featured in the soundtrack to the 2006 film My Blueberry Nights.

=== Grammy Awards ===
| Year | Category | Nominated work | Result |
|---|---|---|---|
| 1968 | Best Rhythm & Blues Group Performance, Vocal or Instrumental | King & Queen | Nominated |
| 1968 | Best Rhythm & Blues Recording | "Try a Little Tenderness" | Nominated |
| 1968 | Best Rhythm & Blues Solo Vocal Performance, Male | "Try a Little Tenderness" | Nominated |
| 1969 | Best Rhythm & Blues Song | "(Sittin' On) The Dock of the Bay" | Won |
| 1969 | Best Rhythm & Blues Vocal Performance, Male | "(Sittin' On) The Dock of the Bay" | Won |

=== Other awards and honors ===
After Redding's death, the Académie du Jazz in France named an award after him. The Prix Otis Redding is given to the best record release in the field of R&B. Redding was the first recipient of the award for The Otis Redding Story on Stax; following winners of the award include Aretha Franklin, Ike & Tina Turner, and Curtis Mayfield. In 1968, the National Association of Television and Radio Announcers (NATRA) created the Otis Redding Award in his honor.

Readers of the British music newspaper Melody Maker voted Redding the top vocalist of 1967, superseding Elvis Presley, who had topped the list for the prior 10 years.

The Rock and Roll Hall of Fame inducted Redding in 1989, declaring his name to be "synonymous with the term soul music that arose out of the black experience in America through the transmutation of gospel and rhythm and blues into a form of funky, secular testifying." In 1988, he was inducted into the Georgia Music Hall of Fame. Five years later, the United States Post Office issued a 29-cent commemorative postage stamp in his honor. Redding was inducted into the Songwriters Hall of Fame in 1994, and in 1999 he received the Grammy Lifetime Achievement Award. The Rock and Roll Hall of Fame included three Redding recordings, "Shake", "(Sittin' On) The Dock of the Bay", and "Try a Little Tenderness", on its list of "The 500 Songs That Shaped Rock and Roll". The Black Music & Entertainment Walk of Fame inducted him in 2021.

American music magazine Rolling Stone ranked Redding at number 21 on their list of the "100 Greatest Artists of All Time" and eighth on their list of the "100 Greatest Singers of All Time". Q ranked Redding fourth among "100 Greatest Singers", after only Frank Sinatra, Franklin and Presley.

Five of his albums, Otis Blue: Otis Redding Sings Soul, Dreams to Remember: The Otis Redding Anthology, The Dock of the Bay, Complete & Unbelievable: The Otis Redding Dictionary of Soul and Live in Europe, were ranked by Rolling Stone on its list of the 500 Greatest Albums of All Time. The first album was singled out for praise by music critics; apart from the Rolling Stone listing at number 74, NME ranked it 35th on their list of the "Greatest Albums of All Time". Music critic Robert Christgau said that Otis Blue was "the first great album by one of soul's few reliable long-form artists", and that Redding's "original LPs were among the most intelligently conceived black albums of the '60s".

In 2002, the city of Macon honored its native son by unveiling a memorial statue (32°50′19.05″N 83°37′17.30″W) in the city's Gateway Park. The park is next to the Otis Redding Memorial Bridge, which crosses the Ocmulgee River. The Rhythm and Blues Foundation named Redding as the recipient of its 2006 Pioneer Award. Billboard awarded Redding the "Otis Redding Excellence Award" the same year. A year later, he was inducted into Hollywood's RockWalk in California.

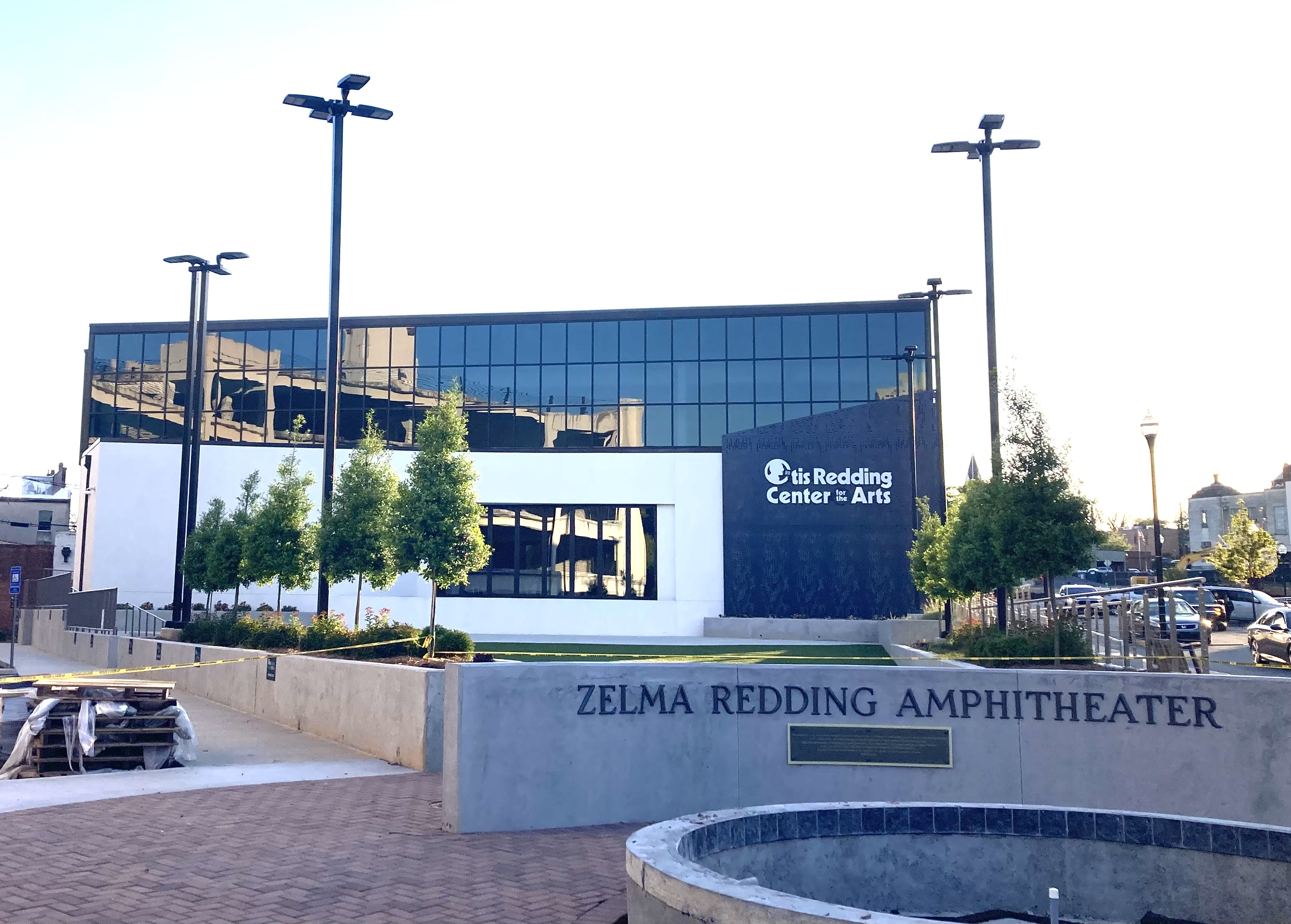
Otis Redding Center for the Arts (opened 2025)

In 2007, Redding's widow, Zelma, established the Otis Redding Foundation in her husband's honor. The Foundation continues to offer music and arts education programs in Macon, operating both the Otis Redding Center for the Arts and the Otis Redding Museum.

On August 17, 2013, in Cleveland, Ohio, the city where Redding did his last show at Leo's Casino, he was inducted into the inaugural class of the Rhythm & Blues Music Hall of Fame at Cleveland State University.

== Discography ==
=== Studio albums ===
- Pain in My Heart (1964)
- The Great Otis Redding Sings Soul Ballads (1965)
- Otis Blue/Otis Redding Sings Soul (1965)
- The Soul Album (1966)
- Complete & Unbelievable: The Otis Redding Dictionary of Soul (1966)
- King & Queen (with Carla Thomas) (1967)

=== Posthumous studio albums ===
- The Dock of the Bay (1968)
- The Immortal Otis Redding (1968)
- In Person at the Whisky a Go Go (1968)
- Love Man (1969)
- Tell the Truth (1970)
- Remember Me (1992)

== See also ==
- Album era
