= Sam & Dave discography =

Cataloging of published recordings by Sam & Dave

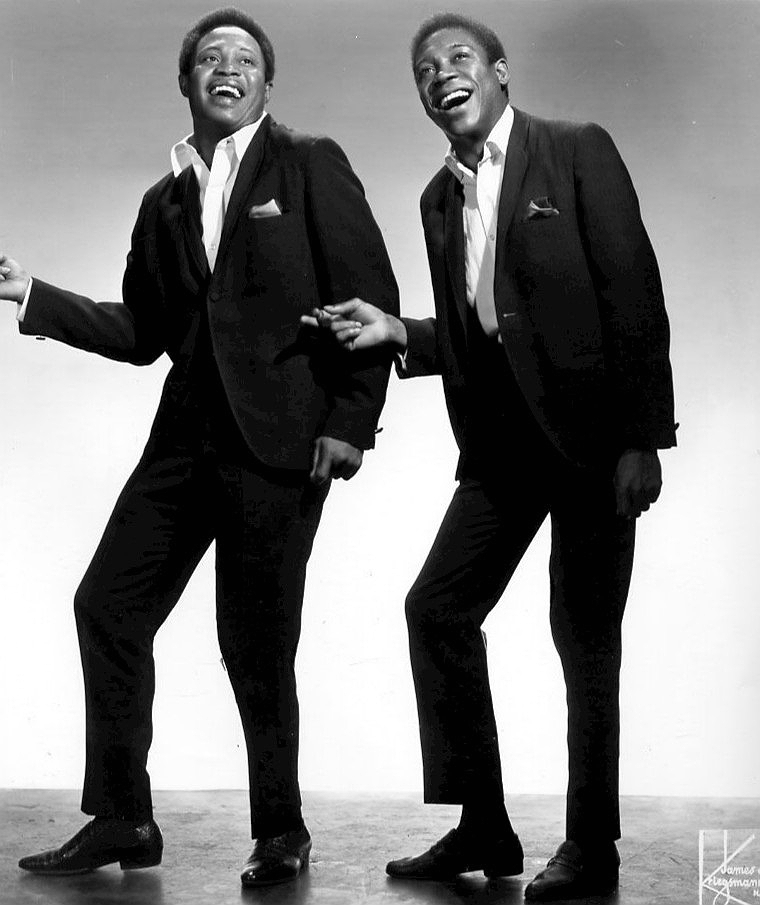
Sam & Dave in 1968

Sam & Dave were an American soul and R&B duo who performed together from 1961 until 1981. The tenor (higher) voice was Sam Moore (1935−2025) and the baritone/tenor (lower) voice was Dave Prater (1937–1988).

== Albums ==
=== Studio albums ===
| Year | Title | Peak chart positions | | | Label |
| Year | Title | US | US R&B | UK | Label |
|---|---|---|---|---|---|
| 1966 | Hold On, I'm Comin' | 45 | 1 | 35 | Stax |
| 1966 | Double Dynamite | 118 | 7 | 28 | Stax |
| 1967 | Soul Men | 62 | 5 | 32 | Stax |
| 1968 | I Thank You | — | 38 | — | Atlantic |
| 1975 | Back At 'Cha | — | — | — | United Artists |
"—" denotes releases that did not chart.

=== Compilation albums ===
- 1966: Sam & Dave (Roulette-Roulette singles compilation)
- 1969: The Best of Sam & Dave (Atlantic SD-8218) Pop #87/R&B #24
- 1969: Double Golden Album (Nippon Grammaphone/Atlantic, Japan-Stax/Atlantic Singles)
- 1978: Sweet & Funky Gold (Gusto, re-recordings of hits)
- 1982: Soul Study Volume 1 (Odyssey, re-recordings of hits+new covers)
- 1982: Soul Study Volume 2 (Odyssey, re-recordings of hits+new covers)
- 1984: I Can't Stand Up for Falling Down (Edsel ED 133 UK: Atlantic & Stax singles not previously released)
- 1984: The Best of Sam & Dave (Atlantic 81279-1-Y)
- 1985: Soul Sister, Brown Sugar (Atlantic, Japan compilation LP of Stax/Atlantic releases)
- 1993: Sweat 'N' Soul: Anthology (1965–1971) (Rhino Records/Atlantic & ATCO Remasters Series 0 8122-71253-2 5 - 2 CD Compilation)

== Singles ==
| Year | Title | Peak chart positions | | | | Certifications |
| Year | Title | US | US R&B | CAN | UK | Certifications |
|---|---|---|---|---|---|---|
| 1962 | "I Need Love" | — | — | — | — | |
| 1962 | "No More Pain" | — | — | — | — | |
| 1963 | "She's Alright" | — | — | — | — | |
| 1963 | "It Was So Nice While It Lasted" | — | — | — | — | |
| 1963 | "If She'll Still Have Me" | — | — | — | — | |
| 1964 | "I Found Out" | — | — | — | — | |
| 1964 | "I'll Never, Never" | — | — | — | — | |
| 1965 | "A Place Nobody Can Find" | — | — | — | — | |
| 1965 | "I Take What I Want" | — | — | — | — | |
| 1965 | "You Don't Know Like I Know" | 90 | 7 | — | 50 | |
| 1966 | "Hold On, I'm Comin'" | 21 | 1 | 54 | — | BPI: Silver |
| 1966 | "Said I Wasn't Gonna Tell Nobody" | 64 | 8 | 74 | — | |
| 1967 | "You Got Me Hummin'" | 77 | 7 | — | — | |
| 1967 | "When Something Is Wrong with My Baby" | 42 | 2 | — | — | |
| 1967 | "Soothe Me" (Live) | 56 | 16 | 45 | 35 | |
| 1967 | "Soul Man" | 2 | 1 | 2 | 24 | BPI: Gold |
| 1968 | "I Thank You" | 9 | 4 | 14 | 34 | |
| 1968 | "Don't Knock It" | — | — | — | — | |
| 1968 | "You Don't Know What You Mean to Me" | 48 | 20 | 42 | — | |
| 1968 | "Can't You Find Another Way" | 54 | 19 | — | — | |
| 1968 | "Everybody Got to Believe in Somebody" | 73 | — | — | — | |
| 1969 | "Soul Sister Brown Sugar" | 41 | 18 | 40 | 15 | |
| 1969 | "Born Again" | 92 | 27 | — | — | |
| 1969 | "Ooh Ooh Ooh" | — | — | — | — | |
| 1970 | "Baby Baby Don't Stop Now" | 117 | — | — | — | |
| 1970 | "One Part Love, Two Parts Pain" | 123 | — | — | — | |
| 1970 | "Knock It Out the Park" | — | — | — | — | |
| 1971 | "Don't Pull Your Love" | 102 | 36 | — | — | |
| 1974 | "A Little Bit of Good (Cures a Whole Lot of Bad)" | — | 89 | — | — | |
| 1974 | "Under the Boardwalk" | — | — | — | — | |
| 1977 | "We Can Work It Out" | — | — | — | — | |
| 1977 | "Why Did You Do It" | — | — | — | — | |
"—" denotes releases that did not chart or were not released in that territory.

== Appearances on other albums ==
- 1967: The Stax/Volt Revue Volume 1: Live in London (three Sam & Dave tracks, four on UK version)
- 1967: The Stax/Volt Revue Volume 2: Live in Paris (three Sam & Dave tracks)
- 1967: Stay in School, Don't Be a Dropout (Stax, Promo LP, one Sam & Dave track plus a PSA)
- 1976: Jaco Pastorius (Jaco Pastorius album, Sam & Dave vocals on "Come On, Come Over")
- 1977: Soul Express (released in Germany by Contempo UK, two Sam & Dave tracks)
- 1978: Soul Deep Vol. 2 (released in Germany by Contempo UK, one track "Living It Down"; only known release of this track)

== CD and DVD collections ==
- 1987: The Best of Sam & Dave (Atlantic) — 21 tracks on one CD
- 1990: An Anthology of Sam & Dave (Atlantic-Canada) — 33 tracks, including extensive bio insert by Rob Bowman.
- 1991: Sweat & Soul (Rhino CD)—50 tracks, including four previously unreleased tracks and extensive booklet on the duo.
- 2006: Sam & Dave: The Definitive Soul Collection (Rhino CD) — 30 tracks, digitally remastered.
- 2007: The 1967 Stax/Volt Revue-Norway (DVD Reelin in the Years) — Four live tracks from spring 1967 tour performing with Booker T. & the MG's and The Mar-Keys. Interviews with Sam Moore and others.
- 2008: The Original Soul Men: Sam & Dave (DVD) — 21 Sam & Dave tracks, including 17 live tracks from 1966 to 1980, and interview with Sam Moore and others

== Other issues ==
- 1982: "Hold On, Edwin's Coming" (Guv-nor Records) Single for Louisiana Governor Edwin Edwards' third election campaign.
- 1985: The New Sam & Dave Revue: A:"Medley-Hold On I'm Comin-You Don't Know-Soul Man-I Thank You Soul Sister, Brown Sugar/B:Hold On" Atlantic 7-99636 (with Sam Daniels and Dave Prater). R&B #92
