= Lawrence "Boo" Mitchell =

American musician and producer

- Born: Memphis, Tennessee
- Genres: R&B, soul, hard rock, blues rock, blues
- Occupations: Musician, record producer, audio engineer
- Instrument: Keyboards
- Years active: 1990–present
- Label: Hi
- Website: royalstudios.com

Lawrence "Boo" Mitchell is an American record producer, musician, songwriter, audio engineer, and owner of Royal Studios in Memphis, Tennessee. He is best known for his work with Al Green, Solomon Burke, Anthony Hamilton, Rod Stewart, John Mayer, Lamont Dozier, William Bell and Cody Chesnutt.

== Early years ==
His father, Willie Mitchell, operated Royal Studios and was Vice President of Hi Records. He produced and arranged music for a variety of acts including Al Green, Ann Peebles, Syl Johnson and Buddy Guy. He's a graduate of Christian Brothers High School in Memphis.

Due to his father's success, Mitchell was surrounded by top recording artists from a very young age, including Al Green, the Jacksons, KC & the Sunshine Band, Michael McDonald, and the Doobie Brothers among others.

Mitchell became interested in music production at a very early age with memories of Royal Studios as early as six years old.

== Career ==
Mitchell began working with his father at a young age, accumulating rare credits and abilities. His own career began at age 17 when he played keyboard on one of Al Green's gospel albums which later won a Grammy Award. Mitchell continued to work on albums alongside his father.

He has been a producer/engineer at Royal Studios from the early 1990s through the present.

In 2006, Mitchell was credited with the horn arrangements for track 12 of John Mayer's Continuum.

In January 2010, Willie Mitchell died, leaving Royal Studios in the hands of his son, both as manager and chief audio engineer.

Since 2010, Mitchell has produced or engineered a wide range of acts including Barbra Blue, Jay Gaunt, Axelle Red, Brandon O. Bailey, Solomon Burke, Cody Chesnutt, Snoop Dogg, Bobby Rush, William Bell, Keb Mo, Terrance Howard and Boz Scaggs.

In 2011, Mitchell tracked an album for Sir Cliff Richard titled Soulicious, which included executive producer David Gest and former Motown producer Lamont Dozier. Mitchell continues to operate Royal Studios as owner, manager and producer.

On April 4, 2014, Sam Moore (Sam & Dave) released "They Killed the King", a tribute song to Dr. Martin Luther King Jr. (1929–1968). Moore re-recorded the song on January 17–18, 2014, at the Royal Studios, with Mitchell mastering the recording. It was written (lyrics and music) in May 1968 by singer-songwriters Bobbejaan Schoepen (Belgium) and Jimmy James Ross (aka Mel Turner, born in Trinidad-Tobago). After four decades the song became rediscovered. During these two weeks in Memphis, ten songs from Schoepen were recorded by Mitchell. Other musicians involved in these sessions were Charles Hodges, Leroy Hodges, Teenie Hodges, Steve Potts, and Mark Plati. "They Killed the King" was arranged by Lester Snell and produced by Mark Plati and Firmin Michiels.

In 2020, Mitchell co-produced Ghalia Volt's album, One Woman Band. The album was released on January 29, 2021, on Ruf Records.

== Family ==
Mitchell and his wife Tanya have five children. He is also the cousin of the Rapper Drake

Mitchell and Tanya are pictured on the cover of RSVP Magazine, February 2019 issue.
