= Royal Studios =

Recording studio in Tennessee, United States

- Industry: Recording Studio
- Founded: Memphis, Tennessee; 1956
- Headquarters: Memphis, Tennessee, United States
- Key people: Willie Mitchell (Owner); Lawrence "Boo" Mitchell (Owner)
- Website: royalstudios.com

Royal Studios is a recording studio located in Memphis, Tennessee, United States. Established in 1956, it is one of the oldest continuously operated music recording studios in the world.

It is widely known for producer, recording artist and owner, Willie Mitchell, and notable productions of Al Green, Chuck Berry, John Mayer, Buddy Guy, My Morning Jacket, Robert Cray, De La Soul, Otis Rush, Keith Richards, Solomon Burke, The Bo-Keys, Bobby Blue Bland, Ann Peebles, Ike & Tina Turner, Tom Jones, Anthony Hamilton, Rod Stewart, Paul Rodgers, Cody Chesnutt, Sam Moore as well as the Barnyard and Soul Men soundtracks.

The studio is operated by the family of Willie Mitchell with son Lawrence "Boo" Mitchell serving as manager/engineer, son Archie Mitchell serving as an engineer and daughter Oona Mitchell serving as administrator.

== Establishment ==
Royal Studios was founded in 1956 in Memphis, Tennessee, as the operating studio of Hi Records.

The original structure was used as a movie theatre, with Shamrock Theatre opening at the location in 1915. Early theatres of this type showed silent movies and were called nickelodeon theatres because of their nickel admission. The Rex Theatre, a previously open-air theatre, took over the location and replaced the Shamrock Theatre. It was converted to sound in the early 1920s and renamed as Royal Theatre.

Royal Theatre remained a neighborhood theatre until it closed in 1955. In 1956, the theatre was rented by Hi Records’ President Joe Cuoghi, his partners Quinton Claunch and John Novarese as well as three silent partners including Cuoghi's lawyer, Nick Pesce.

Hi Records converted the theatre into Royal Recording Studios and opened the doors in 1956.

== History ==
Soon after its establishment in 1956, Royal Studios became known as the “House of Instrumentals”. This name was due to its production of instrumentals hits including Bill Black Combo's “Smokie Part 2”, “Josephine”, "White Silver Sands" and “Don’t Be Cruel” with each selling over a million copies.

In the early 1960s, Hi Records hired Willie Mitchell as a recording artist and producer. His involvement with Royal Studios steadily evolved over the 1960s.

Hi Records founding president, Joe Cuoghi, died in 1970 and the Hi Records label had to restructure. Attorney Nick Pesce became president and Willie Mitchell was promoted to vice president. The Royal Studios facility came under the direction of Willie Mitchell and was renamed Mitchell's Royal Sound Studio.

In 1968, Willie Mitchell met Al Green and offered him a record deal. Willie Mitchell and Al Green began producing and co-writing an album titled “Green Is Blues” – Al Green’s first album released on Hi Records. After this start, Willie Mitchell and Al Green collaborated on seven consecutive gold singles starting in 1970. Al Green sold over 20 million records during his career with Hi Records. For the purpose of perspective and comparison to a similar label, this was more than the combined album sales of Stax Records top recording artists Otis Redding, Sam and Dave, and Booker T. & the M.G.'s during their entire careers.

Other notable artists with albums produced at Royal Studios during this time include Bobby Blue Bland, Chuck Berry, Ike & Tina Turner, Otis Clay, Ann Peebles, Rod Stewart, and Syl Johnson.

Reaching its commercial peak in the early to mid-1970s, Hi Records declined during the late 70s as a result of soul music being replaced by disco. Despite the decline of Hi Records, Royal Studios remained continuously in production of consistent hits from the 1957s through the present.

== Present ==
=== Operation and facilities ===
Royal Studios is in operation at the original location under the management of Lawrence "Boo" Mitchell, while Archie Mitchell serves as an engineer and Oona Mitchell serving as administrator. Lawrence Mitchell's credit roster includes independent artists and notable acts such as Anthony Hamilton, Rod Stewart, Al Green, Cody Chesnutt and 8 Ball. Royal Studios features two vintage MCI recording consoles along with other rare equipment including two original Pultec EQs, Universal Audio LA2As and LA3As.

=== Vintage tape machine collection ===
Royal Studios remains in possession of one of the widest collections of studio grade vintage reel-to-reel tape machines. Several of the tape machines are unique and customized. The collection includes a modified 8-channel Ampex 351 with tube circuits replacing the entire transistor circuitry, a standard Ampex 351, Studer B 67, Sony APR-5000, MCI JH24 and MCI JH16.

== Notable recordings ==
Royal Studios has served a variety of artists during its operation. The list below is of notable albums which feature recordings from Royal Studios. The following albums went Platinum, Gold or won a Grammy or other significant recognition:

- 1966: Charlie Rich – Love Is After Me (USA)
- 1967: Chuck Berry – Chuck Berry In Memphis (USA)
- 1968: Ike and Tina Turner – Too Hot To Hold (USA)
- 1969: Ike and Tina Turner – The Hunter (USA)
- 1970: Al Green – Gets Next To You (USA)
- 1971: Al Green – Let's Stay Together (USA)
- 1972: Al Green – I'm Still In Love With You (USA)
- 1973: Al Green – Livin’ For You (USA)
- 1973: Al Green – Call Me (USA)
- 1974: Otis Clay – Trying To Live My Life Without You (USA)
- 1974: Ann Peebles – I Can't Stand The Rain (USA)
- 1974: Al Green – Explores Your Mind (USA)
- 1975: Al Green – Al Green Is Love (USA)
- 1975: Al Green – Full of Fire (USA)
- 1975: Syl Johnson – Take Me To The River (USA)
- 1975: Rod Stewart – Atlantic Crossing (USA)
- 1976: Al Green – Have A Good Time (USA)
- 1977: O.V. Wright – Into Something I Can't Shake Loose (USA)
- 1981: Jesse Winchester – Talk Memphis (USA)
- 1985: Al Green – He Is The Light (USA)
- 1986: Wet Wet Wet – Popped In Souled Out (UK)
- 1988: Keith Richards – Talk Is Cheap (UK)
- 1989: Al Green – As Long As We’re Together (USA)
- 1992: Pops Staples and The Staple Singers – Peace To The Neighborhood (USA)
- 1994: Tom Jones - The Lead and How to Swing It
- 1995: Toshio Orito – Soul Joint (Japan)
- 1996: Krzysztof Krawczyk (Poland)
- 1997: Boz Scaggs – Come On Home (USA)
- 1998: Johnnie Bassett – Cadillac Blues (USA)
- 1998: Otis Rush – Any Place I'm Going (USA)
- 2000: De La Soul – Art Official Intelligence (USA)
- 2000: Marti Pellow – Smile (UK)
- 2001: Robert Cray – Shoulda Been Home (USA)
- 2001: Jean-Jacques Milteau – Memphis (France)
- 2002: Al Green – I Can't Stop (USA)
- 2003: My Morning Jacket – It Still Moves (USA)
- 2004: Al Green – Everything's O.K. (USA)
- 2005: Buddy Guy – Bring ‘Em In (USA)
- 2005: Roy Young – Memphis (Israel)
- 2005: Marti Pellow – Moonlight Over Memphis (UK)
- 2006: Axelle Red – Jardin Secret (Belgium)
- 2006: The Bo-Keys – Barnyard The Movie Soundtrack (USA)
- 2006: John Mayer – Continuum (USA)
- 2007: Bernard Lavilliers (France)
- 2008: Anthony Hamilton – Soul Men The Movie Soundtrack (USA)
- 2008: Denise LaSalle (USA)
- 2009: Rod Stewart – Soul Book (USA)
- 2010: Solomon Burke – Nothing's Impossible (USA)
- 2011: Cliff Richard – Soulicious (UK)
- 2011: Cody Chesnutt – Landing On A Hundred (USA)
- 2014: Sam Moore - They Killed a King - tribute song to Dr. Martin Luther King Jr. (1929–1968)
- 2014: Paul Rodgers - The Royal Sessions
- 2014: Mark Ronson ft. Bruno Mars - Uptown Funk (USA)
