= Hold On, I'm Comin' =

Hold On, I'm Comin' may refer to:

- Hold On, I'm Comin' (Sam & Dave album), a 1966 album by Sam & Dave
- "Hold On, I'm Comin'" (song), or "Hold On, I'm Coming", a 1966 single by Sam & Dave
- Hold On, I'm Coming (Art Blakey album), 1966
- Hold On, I'm Comin' (Herbie Mann album), 1973
