= Soul Men (album) =

Studio album by Sam & Dave
- Released: October 26, 1967
- Recorded: August 10, October 4, 1967
- Genres: Soul; R&B; Southern soul
- Length: 28:56
- Labels: Stax; Stax 725
- Producers: Isaac Hayes; David Porter

Sam & Dave chronology
Double Dynamite (1967)	Soul Men (1967)	I Thank You (1968)

Singles from Soul Men
- 1. "Soul Man" Released: September 1967

Professional ratings
Review scores
Source	Rating
AllMusic	4.5/5 stars
The Encyclopedia of Popular Music	4/5 stars
MusicHound Rock: The Essential Album Guide	4/5 stars
The Rolling Stone Album Guide	3.5/5 stars

Soul Men is an album by the R&B duo Sam & Dave, released in 1967. It reached No. 5 on the Billboard Top R&B LPs chart and No. 62 on the Top LPs chart. The album launched the hit single "Soul Man", which peaked at No. 1 on the R&B Singles chart and No. 2 on the Hot 100 chart. The song won Sam & Dave the Grammy Award for Best R&B Group, Vocal or Instrumental at the 10th Annual Grammy Awards in 1968.

== Track listing ==
=== Side one ===
1. "Soul Man" (Isaac Hayes, David Porter) - 2:39
2. "May I Baby" (Hayes, Porter) - 2:38
3. "Broke Down Piece of Man" (Steve Cropper, Joe Shamwell) - 2:46
4. "Let It Be Me" (Gilbert Bécaud, Mann Curtis, Pierre Delanoé) - 2:45
5. "Hold It Baby" (Bonnie "Mack" Rice) - 2:35
6. "I'm With You" (Lowman Pauling) - 2:50

=== Side two ===
1. "Don't Knock It" (Hayes, Porter) - 2:28
2. "Just Keep Holding On" (Alvertis Isbell, Booker T. Jones) - 2:52
3. "The Good Runs the Bad Away" (Wayne Jackson, Andrew Love) - 2:15
4. "Rich Kind of Poverty" (Hayes, Paul Selph) - 2:13
5. "I've Seen What Loneliness Can Do" (Homer Banks, Allen Jones) - 2:58

== Personnel ==
- Sam Moore - vocals
- Dave Prater - vocals
- Booker T. & the MG's and the Mar-Key Horns - instrumentation:
  - Booker T. Jones - keyboards
  - Isaac Hayes - Hammond organ
  - Steve Cropper - guitar
  - Donald Dunn - bass guitar
  - Al Jackson Jr. - drums
  - Wayne Jackson - trombone, trumpet
  - Charles "Packy" Axton - tenor saxophone
  - Don Nix - baritone saxophone

Technical

- Loring Eutemey - design
- Jean-Pierre Leloir - photography
