= J. Blackfoot =

- Born: John Colbert; November 20, 1946; Greenville, Mississippi, U.S.
- Died: November 30, 2011 (aged 65) Germantown, Tennessee, U.S.
- Genres: Soul, R&B, southern soul
- Years active: 1967 – 2011

John Colbert (November 20, 1946 – November 30, 2011), known professionally as J. Blackfoot, was an American soul singer. A member of The Soul Children in the late 1960s and 1970s, he subsequently had a moderately successful solo career. His biggest hit was "Taxi", which reached the charts in both the US and UK in 1984.

== Biography ==
John Colbert was born in Greenville, Mississippi, moving as a child to Memphis, Tennessee with his family. Generally known as "J." or "Jay", he acquired the nickname "Blackfoot" as a child, for his habit of walking barefoot on the tarred sidewalks. In 1965, while spending some time in Tennessee State Penitentiary in Nashville for car theft, he met Johnny Bragg, the founder of The Prisonaires vocal group. After leaving prison, Colbert recorded a single under his own name for the small Sur-Speed label before returning to Memphis. There he was heard singing in a street-corner group by David Porter of Stax Records. After the plane crash that claimed the lives of Otis Redding and four members of The Bar-Kays, Colbert joined the reconstituted group as lead singer, and performed with them for several months, but did not record.

In 1968, after Sam & Dave had moved from Stax to Atlantic Records, Porter and his songwriting and production partner Isaac Hayes decided to put together a new vocal group of two men and two women. They recruited Blackfoot, together with Norman West, Anita Louis, and Shelbra Bennett, to form The Soul Children. Between 1968 and 1978, The Soul Children had 15 hits on the R&B chart, including three that crossed over to the Billboard Hot 100, and recorded seven albums.

The Soul Children disbanded in 1979. Blackfoot worked with bands in the Memphis area and recorded a solo for the local Prime Cut label. In 1983, he began working again with writer and producer Homer Banks, with whom he had recorded with The Soul Children. He recorded "Taxi", a song originally written for Johnnie Taylor but not recorded by him. Blackfoot's record rose to no. 4 on the R&B chart and no. 90 on the pop chart, also reaching no. 48 in the UK.

Colbert recorded several albums and had several more R&B hits on Banks' Sound Town label before moving to the Edge label formed by Al Bell in 1986. In 1987, he had another significant hit, "Tear Jerker", a duet with Ann Hines, reaching no. 28 on the R&B chart. Background Singer Larry(LJ)Johnson played a Major part in his first four albums including and after Taxi as Singer Writer and Vocal Arranger before joining The Barkays. . J. Blackfoot later moved to the Basix label, continuing to release albums into the new millennium.

In 2007, Blackfoot and West reformed the Soul Children, with Hines and fourth member Cassandra Graham. In 2010, Blackfoot appeared as part of David Porter's music revue.

J. Blackfoot died of pancreatic cancer on November 30, 2011.

== Discography ==
=== Albums ===
- City Slicker (Sound Town, 1983)
- Physical Attraction (Sound Town, 1984)
- U-Turn (Edge, 1987)
- Loveaholic (Basix, 1991)
- Room Service (Basix, 1993)
- Reality (Basix, 1995)
- This Christmas (Basix, 1997)
- Stealing Love (Basix, 1997)
- Having An Affair (Basix, 1999)
- Same Place Same Time (Basix, 2001)
- It Ain't Over Til It's Over (JEA Music, 2006)
- Woof Woof Meow (JEA Music, 2009)
- Soles Of My Shoes (Locobop, 2009)

=== Chart singles ===
Year	Single	Chart Positions		
Year	Single	US Pop	US R&B	UK
1983	"Taxi"	90	4	48
1984	"I Stood On The Sidewalk And Cried"	-	63	-
1985	"Don't You Feel It Like I Feel It"	-	62	-
1985	"Hiding Place"	-	77	-
1986	"U-Turn"	-	33	-
1987	"Bad Weather"	-	78	-
1987	"Tear Jerker"; J. Blackfoot featuring Ann Hines	-	28	-
1987	"Respect Yourself"	-	58	-
