= The Soul Children =

American vocal group

- Origin: Memphis, Tennessee, U.S.
- Genres: Soul, disco
- Years active: 1968–1979, 2007–2008
- Labels: Stax, Epic
- Past members: Norman West Jr. John Colbert (J. Blackfoot); Anita Louis; Shelbra Bennett; Ann Hines; Cassandra Graham

The Soul Children was an American vocal group who recorded soul music for Stax Records in the late 1960s and early 1970s. They had three top 10 hits on the U.S. Billboard R&B chart – "The Sweeter He Is" (1969), "Hearsay" (1972), and "I'll Be the Other Woman" (1973) – all of which crossed over to the Billboard Hot 100.

== Career ==
The group was formed in 1968 by Isaac Hayes and David Porter of Stax Records in Memphis, Tennessee, after Sam & Dave, one of the label's top acts, were forced to leave Stax and return to the Atlantic label following the termination of the Stax/Atlantic partnership. As leading songwriters and producers for the label, Hayes and Porter put together a vocal group with two male and two female singers, all of whom sang lead on some of the group's recordings. The original members were Norman West, John Colbert (a.k.a. J. Blackfoot), Anita Louis, and Shelbra Bennett.

Colbert, who had been known from childhood as "Blackfoot" for his habit of walking barefoot on the tarred sidewalks of Memphis during the hot summers, had recorded solo singles before joining The Bar-Kays as lead singer, after four original band members were killed with Otis Redding in a plane crash. Anita Louis was a backing singer on some of the records produced by Hayes and Porter. Shelbra Bennett recently had joined the label as a singer. Norman West Jr., the last to join the group, grew up in Louisiana, and sang in church with his brothers Joe, James, and Robert. He replaced William Bell as a member of The Del-Rios in 1962, later recorded several unsuccessful solo singles in Memphis, and sang with Colors Incorporated, a rock band formed by members of Jerry Lee Lewis' band.

The group's first record, "Give 'Em Love", produced by Hayes and Porter and released in late 1968, was a Billboard R&B chart hit, as were two follow-ups. Their fourth single, "The Sweeter He Is", became one of their biggest hits, reaching no. 7 on the R&B chart in late 1969 and no. 52 on the Billboard Hot 100. The group also released Soul Children, their first album, in 1969. Musicians used on the recordings included Booker T. Jones, Steve Cropper, Donald "Duck" Dunn and Al Jackson Jr., of Booker T. & the M.G.'s, as well as Hayes. However, after the group had a minor hit with a slowed-down version of "Hold On, I'm Coming" in early 1970, Hayes left the project to develop his solo career. The group recorded Best of Two Worlds, a second album, at Muscle Shoals Sound Studios, but their next few singles failed to make the charts.

In 1972, they recorded another album, Genesis, arranged by Dale Warren and produced by Jim Stewart and Al Jackson, which produced another hit single, "Hearsay". Written by West and Colbert, it reached no. 5 on the R&B chart and no. 44 on the U.S. pop chart. They appeared at the Wattstax concert in August 1972, and followed up with several smaller hit singles. In 1973, they recorded the ballad "I'll Be the Other Woman", written and produced by Homer Banks and Carl Hampton, and with lead vocals by Shelbra Bennett, which became their biggest hit, reaching no. 3 on the R&B chart, no. 36 on the pop chart, and no. 93 in Canada. They also recorded Friction, a final album for Stax with Banks and Hampton.

The Soul Children left Stax as the company went under in 1975, and Bennett left for a solo career. She changed her name to Shelbra Deane and under this recorded a few solo 45s for TK, Casino and Muscle Shoals Sound. The trio of West, Colbert and Louis signed to Epic Records in 1976, releasing Finders Keepers, an album, and several moderately successful singles. Where Is Your Woman Tonight (1977), their second album for Epic, reunited the group with producer David Porter. Porter then signed the group to a reactivated Stax label established by Fantasy Records, and co-produced Open Door Policy (1978), another album for the group. However, it was less successful than their earlier recordings, and the group decided to split in 1979.

== Later activities ==
After the group split, Anita Louis left the music business and later worked for FedEx, Time-Warner, and as a professional business trainer. Norman West continued working in night clubs and as a gospel singer and musician. J. Blackfoot became a successful solo singer; his biggest hit was "Taxi" in early 1984, which reached no. 4 on the R&B chart. Shelbra Bennett recorded several singles as Shelbra Deane in the late 1970s and early 1980s; her biggest solo success was "Don't Touch Me" (no. 50 R&B) in 1977.

In 2007, West and Blackfoot decided to reform the Soul Children, adding two new singers: Ann Hines and Cassandra Graham. They recorded Still Standing, an album, for JEA Right Now Records. West released a single in 2008 called "Long Ride Home."

J. Blackfoot died of pancreatic cancer in Germantown, Tennessee, on November 30, 2011, at the age of 65. Shelbra Bennett died in Memphis, Tennessee, on May 31, 2013, at the age of 66. The news was posted on the Stax Museum's website. Anita Louis died in Memphis on October 20, 2026, at the age of 76.

== Original members ==
- Shelbra Bennett (later known as Shelbra Deane; born Shelby Dene Bennett, Memphis, Tennessee, February 12, 1947 – May 31, 2013, Memphis, Tennessee)
- John Colbert (a.k.a. J. Blackfoot; born November 20, 1946, Greenville, Mississippi – November 30, 2011)
- Anita Louis (born November 24, 1949, Memphis, Tennessee – October 20, 2026, Memphis, Tennessee)
- Norman Richard West Jr. (born October 30, 1939, Monroe, Louisiana)

== Discography ==
=== Albums ===
Year	Album	Peak chart positions		Label
Year	Album	US	US R&B	Label
1968	Soul Children	154	9	Stax 2018
1971	Best of Two Worlds	—	20	Stax 2043
1972	Genesis	159	36	Stax 3003
1974	Friction	—	38	Stax 5507
1976	Finders Keepers	—	54	Epic
1977	Where Is Your Woman Tonight?	—	—	Epic
1978	Open Door Policy	—	—	Stax
1979	Chronicle	—	—	Stax
"—" denotes releases that did not chart.

=== Singles ===
Year	Label	A-side	B-side	Chart Positions	
Year	Label	A-side	B-side	US Pop	US R&B
1968	Stax 0008	"Give 'Em Love"	"Move Over"	—	40
1969	Stax 0018	"I'll Understand"	"Doing Our Thang"	—	29
1969	Stax 0030	"Tighten Up My Thang"	"Take up the Slack"	—	49
1969	Stax 0050	"The Sweeter He Is - Part I"	"The Sweeter He Is - Part II"	52	7
1970	Stax 0062	"Hold On, I'm Coming"	"Make It Good"	—	48
1970	Stax 0075	"Put Your World in My World"	"Finish Me Off"	—	—
1971	Stax 0086	"Let's Make a Sweet Thing Sweeter"	"Finish Me Off"	—	—
1971	Stax 0102	"Gonna Get Away from It All"	"Ridin' on Love Merry-Go-Round"	—	—
1972	Stax 0119	"Hearsay"	"Don't Take My Sunshine"	44	5
1972	Stax 0132	"Don't Take My Kindness for Weakness"	"Just the One I've Been Looking for"	102	14
1973	Stax 0152	"It Ain't Always What You Do (It's Who You Let See You Do It)"	"All That Shines Ain't Gold"	105	11
1973	Stax 0170	"Love Is a Hurtin' Thing"	"Poem on the School House Door"	—	59
1973	Stax 0182	"I'll Be the Other Woman"	"Come Back Kind of Love"	36	3
1974	Stax 0218	"Love Makes It Right"	"Love Makes It Right Pt. II"	—	47
1974	Stax 0230	"What's Happening Baby Pt. I"	"What's Happening Baby Pt. II"	—	—
1976	Epic 50178	"Finders Keepers"	"Midnight Sunshine"	—	49
1976	Epic 50236	"If You Move I'll Fall"	"Little Understanding"	—	99
1977	Epic 50345	"Where Is Your Woman Tonight?"	"Merry-Go-Round"	—	96
1977	Epic 50405	"You Don't Need a Ring"	"There Always"	—	—
1978	Stax 3206	"Can't Give Up a Good Thing"	"Signed, Sealed, Delivered"	—	19
1978	Stax 3211	"Summer in the Shade"	"Hard Living with a Man"	—	—
1978	Stax 3214	"Who You Used to Be"	"Believing"	—	—
"—" denotes releases that did not chart.
