= Hold On, I'm Comin' (Sam & Dave album) =

Studio album by Sam and Dave
- Released: April 1, 1966
- Recorded: 1965–1966
- Genre: Soul
- Length: 32:04
- Label: Stax/Atlantic; Stax 708
- Producer: Jim Stewart

Sam and Dave chronology
Hold On, I'm Comin' (1966)	Double Dynamite (1967)

Singles from Hold On, I'm Comin'
- 1. "Hold On, I'm Comin'" Released: March 1966

Professional ratings
Review scores
Source	Rating
Allmusic	4/5 stars

Hold On, I'm Comin' is the 1966 debut album by Atlantic Records soul duo Sam & Dave, issued on the Atlantic-distributed Stax label in 1966.

The album reached number one on the Billboard R&B Albums chart and number 45 on the Billboard Top LPs chart, launching two charting singles. The title track peaked at number one on the Billboard Hot Black Singles chart, and at number 21 on the Billboard Hot 100, while "You Don't Know Like I Know" peaked at number seven and number 90. An Allmusic review refers to Hold On, I'm Comin' as epitomizing "Memphis soul in all its unpretentious, down-home glory".

== Background on title track ==
According to Steve Cropper, lead guitarist for Booker T. & the M.G.'s, the Stax Recording Studio played a key role in the creation of the title track, Hold on, I'm Comin'. Stax Records was an old Movie Theater located at 926 East McLemore Avenue in Memphis, Tennessee. The men's restroom in the theater-turned studio had tile walls and tile floors. To produce reverb and echo a speaker from the studio was placed in the men's room to pipe the sound into the men's room; and a microphone was placed in the men's room to return the sound back to the recording studio. This arrangement produced both the reverb and echo heard on Stax Records. The song was written by Isaac Hayes and David Porter. They had been working for a while when Porter went to the restroom. Hayes grew impatient and yelled for Porter to get back to the writing session. Porter replied: "Hold on, I'm comin'." They both recognized the sexual overtone and completed the song within an hour.

== Track listing ==
Except where otherwise noted, all tracks written by Isaac Hayes and David Porter.

=== Side one ===
1. "Hold On, I'm Comin'" – 2:36
2. "If You Got the Loving" (Steve Cropper, Hayes, Porter) – 2:33
3. "I Take What I Want" (Hayes, Mabon "Teenie" Hodges, Porter) – 2:33
4. "Ease Me" – 2:25
5. "I Got Everything I Need" (Cropper, Eddie Floyd, Alvertis Isbell) – 2:56
6. "Don't Make It So Hard on Me" (Floyd, Willia Dean "Deanie" Parker) – 2:45

=== Side two ===
1. "It's a Wonder" – 2:53
2. "Don't Help Me Out" – 3:09
3. "Just Me" (Randall Catron, Mary Frierson, Parker) – 2:40
4. "You Got It Made" – 2:33
5. "You Don't Know Like I Know" – 2:40
6. "Blame Me (Don't Blame My Heart)" (Cropper, Isbell) – 2:22

== Personnel ==
- Samuel Moore – lead vocals and backing vocals
- Dave Prater – lead vocals and backing vocals
- Booker T. & the M.G.'s and the Mar-Key Horns – instrumentation:
  - Booker T. Jones – Hammond organ
  - Steve Cropper – electric guitar
  - Donald Dunn – bass
  - Al Jackson Jr. – drums
  - Wayne Jackson – trombone, trumpet
  - Charles "Packy" Axton – tenor saxophone
  - Don Nix – baritone saxophone

Technical

- Deanie Parker – liner notes
- Ronnie Stoots – cover artwork

== Cover versions ==
Aretha Franklin recorded the title song for her 1981 album Love All the Hurt Away.

In August, 2007 soul singer Guy Sebastian recorded a tribute version of "Hold On, I'm Comin" at Ardent Studios in Memphis, Tennessee for his album of soul classics The Memphis Album with many of the original Stax music band members including Steve Cropper, Donald Duck Dunn, Lester Snell and Steve Potts.

Another cover version was recorded by Cliff Bennett and the Rebel Rousers in 1966. Tom Jones covered it on his 1967 album 13 Smash Hits.

Many other artists have covered this song, including: Eric Burdon, Bryan Ferry, Solomon Burke, The Chords, Eric Clapton and BB King, Michael Bolton, the Weather Girls, King Curtis, George Benson, Tina Turner, Jerry Lee Lewis, Iron Butterfly, Martha & the Vandellas, Dexy's Midnight Runners, the Boogie Kings, Bruce Springsteen, Precious Wilson, Melissa Etheridge, and Hanson.

Some artists sampled some parts of the song like Village People in their song "I'm a Cruiser" (1978).

== See also ==
- List of number-one R&B albums of 1966 (U.S.)
