= A Little Bit of Good =

"A Little Bit of Good" may refer to:

- "A Little Bit of Good (Cures a Whole Lot of Bad)", a soul hit from 1974
- "A Little Bit of Good", a number in the 1975 musical Chicago
