= Soul Men =

2008 American musical comedy film directed by Malcolm D. Lee

- Theatrical release poster
- Directed by: Malcolm D. Lee
- Written by: Robert Ramsey; Matthew Stone
- Produced by: David T. Friendly; Charles Castaldi; Steve Greener
- Starring: Samuel L. Jackson; Bernie Mac; Sharon Leal; Sean Hayes; Affion Crockett; Adam Herschman; John Legend
- Narrated by: Randy Jackson
- Cinematography: Matthew F. Leonetti
- Edited by: William Henry; Paul Millspaugh
- Music by: Stanley Clarke
- Production companies: Dimension Films; Friendly Films
- Distributed by: Metro-Goldwyn-Mayer
- Release date: November 7, 2008
- Running time: 100 minutes
- Country: United States
- Language: English
- Budget: $40 million
- Box office: $12.3 million

Soul Men is a 2008 American musical comedy film directed by Malcolm D. Lee and starring Samuel L. Jackson, Bernie Mac, Sharon Leal, Sean Hayes, Affion Crockett, Adam Herschman and John Legend in his film debut. This was also Isaac Hayes's final film.

The film was released by Metro-Goldwyn-Mayer on November 7, 2008. It was one of three films featuring Mac that were released after his death (and was actually released on the same date as another posthumous film, Madagascar: Escape 2 Africa). Mac and Hayes died on August 9 and 10, 2008, respectively, and the film is dedicated to their memory. Director Lee said the film was heavily re-edited to soften the tone of the film, as a tribute to the two actors. Critical reviews were mixed, and the film was financially unsuccessful as it grossed $12.3 million against a $40 million budget.

== Plot ==
The Real Deal was a soul music trio (lead singer Marcus Hooks and backup singers Floyd Henderson and Louis Hinds) that was popular decades ago. However, the group dissolved when Marcus left to become a solo act. Louis and Floyd's friendship soured, and they did not speak to each other for the next 30 years. Floyd, recently retired, is having difficulty adjusting to his new life. He learns that Marcus has died. Louis, an ex-convict who became an auto mechanic, is contacted by executive Danny Epstein to perform with Floyd at the Apollo Theater in New York City as a tribute to Marcus. Louis declines. Floyd meets with Louis and mentions that they will be paid $40,000. (Note: This enticement is later revealed to be a lie.) Louis begrudgingly agrees to travel with Floyd cross-country for the concert.

They arrive at a hotel in Flagstaff, Arizona, where they will stay overnight and perform, but their performance is a disaster. As they argue after the failed performance, they recall what caused their friendship to dissolve decades earlier: Floyd's bedding Louis's girlfriend. The next morning, however, they hear one of their old songs playing on the radio, and they start dancing, reminiscing on their time as a group.

The duo perform well at a hotel in Amarillo, Texas. When their money is stolen by women posing as groupies, they contact Phillip, Epstein's intern, but he is unable to provide funds. The duo travel to Tulsa, Oklahoma to the home of a woman they used to know, Odetta. They meet Odetta's daughter Cleo and Cleo's live-in boyfriend Lester, a rapper and drug dealer. Cleo informs the travelers that Odetta died.

During their visit, Louis notices Cleo singing and playing on her piano; he realizes she has musical talent. Floyd and Louis ask Cleo if she will join them on their trip. They see signs of physical abuse, so Louis confronts Lester, who pulls out a gun but is overtaken by Louis. Louis forces Lester to apologize to both Floyd and Cleo, then breaks Lester's arm. Arriving in Memphis, Tennessee, Floyd, Louis and Cleo meet Phillip at their hotel. Floyd and Louis perform at the hotel, with Cleo as their lead singer. Her performance attracts the attention of famed soul musician Isaac Hayes (playing himself). Meanwhile, Lester has pursued the group to Memphis, and he abducts Phillip. Floyd, who's about to tell Cleo that he believes he is her father, learns that he is not. Cleo explains that Louis is actually her father, and this leads to a physical altercation between Floyd and Louis. After the fight, Louis states that it is a bad idea to be in Cleo's life because he ruined his own. After hearing this statement, Cleo tearfully runs away. Lester confronts Louis and Floyd to retaliate against both of them, but they subdue him. However, Floyd and Louis are arrested.

Floyd is released, but Louis stays in custody due to a parole violation. Floyd breaks Louis out of jail, believing that he is dying. They steal Lester's friends' car and discover Phillip has been locked in the car's trunk. Phillip contacts Danny that The Real Deal are on their way to perform, but Phillip is fired, and Floyd and Louis are removed from the show. They arrive at the theater anyway, and Floyd convinces Danny to let them perform, confiding that Louis is dying. Isaac Hayes greets them at their dressing room, and they are surprised when Cleo appears. As Louis and Cleo reconcile, he experiences abdominal pain, which causes concern that the pain is indicating his health is failing, but Louis reveals it is merely a kidney stone.

The police arrive at the theater, so Louis and Floyd hide in what looks like a piano. However, it is a piano shaped casket which contains Marcus's corpse. Floyd and Louis get out of the casket and step onstage to perform their hit "Walk In the Park", once again with Cleo. They are then arrested by the police.

An epilogue reads that Floyd and Louis were later released on good behavior, and they resumed touring, with Cleo as their new lead singer and Phillip as their new manager.

== Cast ==
- Samuel L. Jackson as Louis Hinds
- Bernie Mac as Floyd Henderson
- Sharon Leal as Cleo Whitfield
- Sean Hayes as Danny Epstein
- Affion Crockett as Lester
- Adam Herschman as Philip
- Jennifer Coolidge as Rosalee
- Isaac Hayes as himself
- Ken Davitian as Ardesh Kezian
- Jackie Long as Zig-Zag
- Fatso Fasano as Bay-Bay
- P. J. Byrne as Floyd's Doctor
- Sara Erikson as Chastity
- John Legend as Marcus Hooks
- Mike Epps as Duane Henderson
- Millie Jackson as Floyd's ex Claudette
- Vanessa del Rio as Full Figured Neighbor
- Randy Jackson as The Narrator (voice)

== Production ==
=== Music ===
The score for the film was composed by Stanley Clarke. The song, "I'm Your Puppet", which serves as the fictional trio's 1969 hit single, was actually a hit for James & Bobby Purify in 1966. The official soundtrack was released November 4, 2008 by Stax Records, and features music by John Legend, Isaac Hayes, Sharon Jones & The Dap-Kings, and others.

== Reception ==
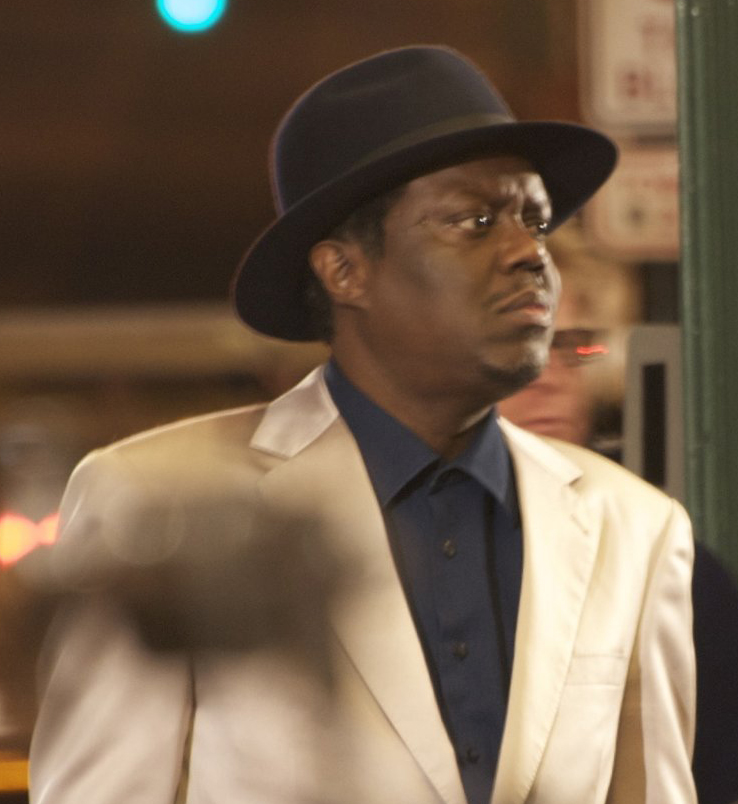
Bernie Mac on the set of the film in March 2008

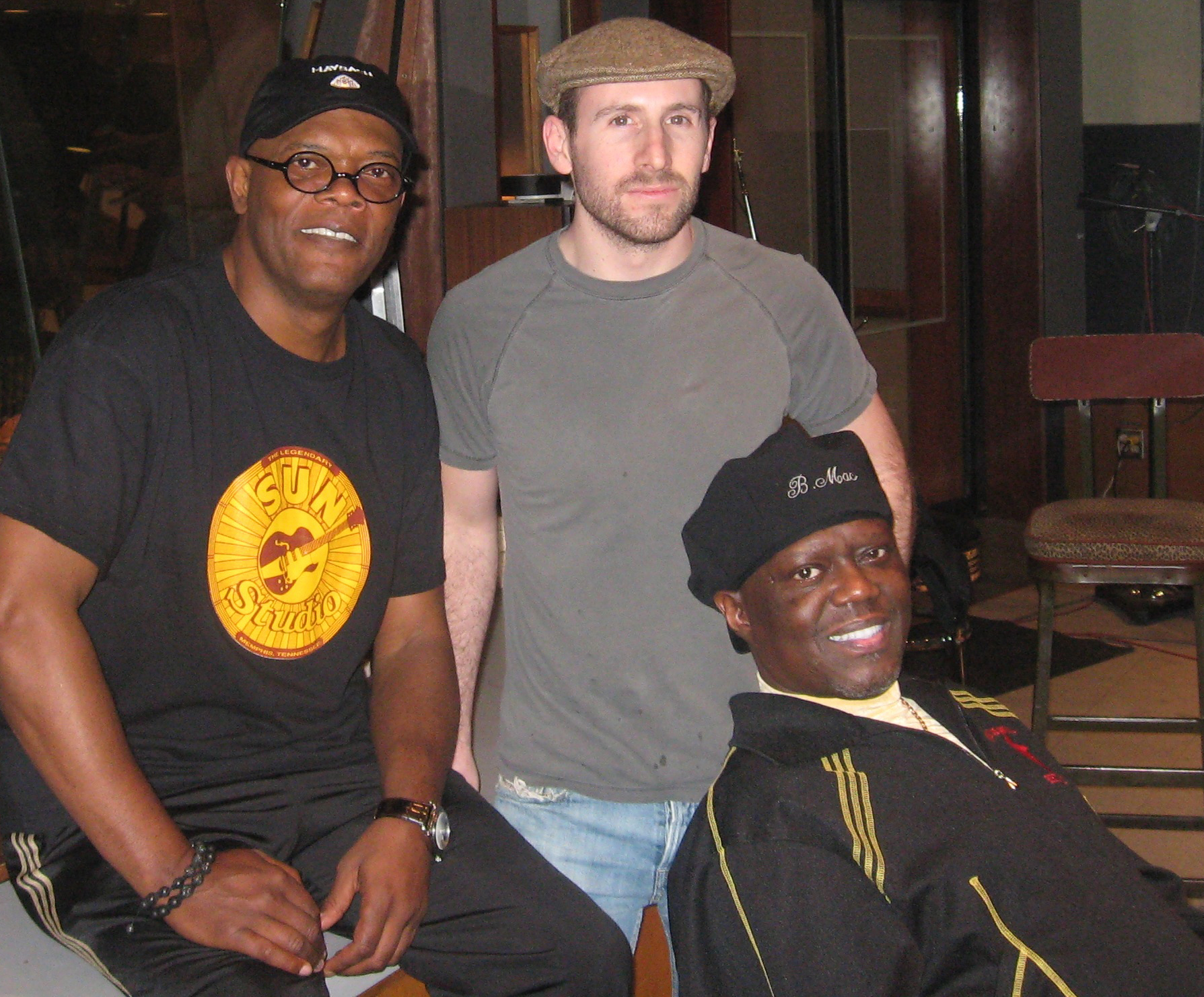
Jackson and Mac with Gabe Witcher prerecording songs for the film in December 2007

Soul Men received mixed reviews from film critics. Based on 99 reviews, Rotten Tomatoes reported that 44% of critics gave the film a positive review stating that "Soul Men features lively performances from Bernie Mac and Samuel L. Jackson, and some hilarious moments, but ultimately suffers from an unoriginal script." Metacritic, another review aggregator, reported that critics gave the film an average score of 49/100, based on 23 reviews. Roger Ebert of The Chicago Sun-Times gave the Soul Men three stars out of a possible four, saying it "will make you miss Bernie Mac" and also allowed Mac to hint at talent with dramatic roles that the comedian rarely had a chance to explore.

The film opened at #6 with a gross of about $5 million, behind Zack and Miri Make a Porno, Changeling, High School Musical 3: Senior Year, Role Models, and Madagascar: Escape 2 Africa (the latter also featured Mac; both films are dedicated in his memory). At the conclusion of its domestic theatrical run on February 5, 2009, the film's gross was $12,082,391.

Director Malcolm D. Lee said the movie was a box office failure because "nobody gave a shit about two old R&B singers."

=== Lawsuit ===
In February 2009, singer Sam Moore of the musical duo Sam & Dave filed suit against The Weinstein Company and other producers. Moore alleged copyright infringement on the marks "Soul Man" and "Soul Men", claiming the movie is based on the careers of Sam & Dave who did not speak for years after a feud, and had a major hit with the 1967 song "Soul Man". The suit also claimed the film damaged Moore's reputation and career. The judge agreed there were "broad similarities" between Moore's life and the film's story, but also noted Moore was not named in the film and there no evidence the film was ever confused with reality. Thus, the case was dismissed on summary judgment in May 2012.

== Home media ==
The film was released on DVD on February 10, 2009 and by the 5th week, about 483,360 units have been sold, bringing in $9,443,721 in revenue. This does not include Blu-ray Disc sales.
