= Jimmy James Ross =

Trinbagonian singer (1936–2000)

James Albert Abraham (April 10, 1936, Trinidad and Tobago – March 21, 2000, Wiekevorst, Belgium), known as Jimmy James Ross or Mel Turner, was a singer and composer mostly known for his 1981 boogie hit in England, "First True Love Affair".

He joined the US Navy at a young age as a cook. Later in life, he took his mother's last name, Ross. During his teenage years in the Navy, he quickly became known for his singing capabilities on board of the ship. Making extra money in local bars and clubs whenever they went ashore, Ross quickly got recognition for his talent.

Not long after leaving the Navy, he made his way to Europe. Having lived in the U.K. and Germany, where he got married, he finally settled down in Belgium, where he lived for the rest of his life.

While living in Kasterlee-Lichtaart, he became friends with the singer-songwriter and amusement park owner Bobbejaan Schoepen and his family. He started to perform and record as "Mel Turner." He lived for many years in Bobbejaanland where he and Bobbejaan Schoepen worked together.

In April 1968, after the assassination of Martin Luther King Jr., Ross and Schoepen wrote the song "They Killed the King." It was intended to be a tribute to all peaceful defenders of equality, humanity, and freedom. The song was initially published on Bobbejaan Records on May 14, 1968, which was less than six weeks after King's assassination. In the wake of this tragedy, Ross and Schoepen decided to honor the memory of Martin Luther King Jr. by composing a new song. Later, it became also the opening track of Ross's album, A Portrait of Mel Turner (1970).

One of his most notable achievements was the song "First True Love Affair" (composed by Luciano Ninzatti / Stefano Pulga, and himself as Mel Turner), which reached number 7 on the dance music chart and number 90 on the US Billboard. Another successful song he produced was "Fall into a Trance" which had similarly achieved great success.

During the 1980s and 1990s, he moved back to Bobbejaanland to perform there most of the time.

In 1993, Ross was diagnosed with emphysema. After a long battle with the disease, he died on March 21, 2000 at the age of 63.

Beginning in April 2014, "They Killed A King" was released in Europe and across the US by Sam Moore.
