= Soul Man (song) =

1967 hit single

Single by Sam & Dave

from the album Soul Men
- B-side: "May I Baby"
- Released: September 1967
- Recorded: 1967
- Studio: Stax (Memphis)
- Genre: Southern soul; R&B
- Length: 2:39
- Label: Stax/Atlantic; S-231
- Songwriters: Isaac Hayes; David Porter
- Producers: Isaac Hayes; David Porter

Sam & Dave singles chronology
| "Soothe Me" (1967) | "Soul Man" (1967) | "I Thank You" (1968) |

"Soul Man" is a 1967 song written and composed by Isaac Hayes and David Porter, first successful as a number 2 hit single by Atlantic Records soul duo Sam & Dave, which consisted of Samuel "Sam" Moore and David "Dave" Prater. In 2019, "Soul Man" was selected for preservation in the National Recording Registry as "culturally, historically, and aesthetically significant" by the Library of Congress. It was No. 463 in "Top 500 Greatest Songs of All Time" by Rolling Stone in 2010 and No. 458 in 2004.

== Song history and background ==
Co-author Isaac Hayes found the inspiration for "Soul Man" in the turmoil of the Civil Rights Movement of the 1960s. In July 1967, watching a television newscast of the aftermath of the 12th Street riot in Detroit, Michigan, Hayes noted that black residents had marked buildings that had not been destroyed during the riots – mostly African-American owned and operated institutions – with the word "soul". Relating this occurrence to the biblical story of the Passover, Hayes and songwriting partner David Porter came up with the idea, in Hayes's words, of "a story about one's struggle to rise above his present conditions. It's almost a tune kind of like boasting, 'I'm a soul man.' It's a pride thing."

According to co-author David Porter, the reference to "Woodstock" in the song does not refer to the 1969 counter-cultural music festival (which took place two years after the song was released), but instead to a segregated rural vocational school in Millington, Tennessee, called Woodstock Training School. Porter, who did not attend the school, said the line was included to stress the importance of getting an education. Woodstock Training School, which had been renamed Woodstock High School in 1963, was converted into an elementary school following desegregation in 1970.

Sam sings the first verse, with Dave joining in the chorus. Dave sings the second verse, with Sam joining in the chorus. Sam sings the third verse, with Dave joining in the chorus, followed by a brief bridge section by Dave and then a coda, in which both Sam and Dave repeat the title phrase a half-step up, before the song's fade.

The exclamation "Play it, Steve" heard in the song refers to guitarist Steve Cropper of Booker T. & the M.G.'s, the house band who provided the instrumentation for it and other Sam and Dave singles. Cropper provided guitar for both the original Sam and Dave recording as well as the live and studio covers by the Blues Brothers.

Issued on the Atlantic-distributed Stax label for which Hayes and Porter worked, Sam and Dave's "Soul Man" was the most successful Stax single to date upon its release. The single peaked at number one on the Billboard Hot Rhythm & Blues Singles chart. "Soul Man" went to number two on the Billboard Hot 100 in the United States during the autumn of 1967. It was kept out of the top spot by the song "To Sir With Love" by Lulu. Outside the US, it peaked at number two in Canada. "Soul Man" was awarded the 1968 Grammy Award for Best Rhythm & Blues Group Performance, Vocal or Instrumental. In 1999, the song was inducted into the Grammy Hall of Fame.

Cash Box reviewed the single saying "Few enough acts pack the impact and terrific ability to attack a song with vigor that Sam & Dave have. Couple this drive with a solid slamming song like 'Soul Man,' add some groovy ork support and a readymade following and the result is an instant smash." Record World predicted that it "will wow the pop and r/b fans in no time flat".

== Personnel ==
- Vocals by Sam Moore and Dave Prater
- Instrumentation by Booker T. & the M.G.'s and the Mar-Keys Horns
  - Booker T. Jones – piano
  - Isaac Hayes – organ
  - Steve Cropper – guitar
  - Donald "Duck" Dunn – bass
  - Al Jackson Jr. – drums
  - Wayne Jackson – trumpet
  - Charles "Packy" Axton – tenor saxophone
  - Don Nix – baritone saxophone

== Cover versions ==
"Soul Man"

Single by the Blues Brothers

from the album Briefcase Full of Blues
- B-side: "Excusez Moi Mon Cherie"
- Released: December 1978
- Genre: Blue-eyed soul
- Length: 2:55
- Label: Atlantic
- Songwriters: Isaac Hayes & David Porter
- Producer: Bob Tischler

The Blues Brothers singles chronology
| "Soul Man" (1978) | "Rubber Biscuit" (1978) |

- Ramsay Lewis covered "Soul Man" on his 1967 album Up Pops Ramsey Lewis. The song reached #64 in Canada.
- Paul Revere & the Raiders covered "Soul Man" on their 1968 album Goin' to Memphis.
- Psychedelic band Rotary Connection covered the song with added elements of Baroque music in their eponymous 1968 debut album.
- Los Quandos, a Spanish vocal group, released the first version with Spanish lyrics, written by Jose Manuel Vidal and included in a compilation, released by the Marfer Records label, titled Marfer Parade, published in 1968.
- James Brown band member Sweet Charles Sherrell recorded the song for his 1974 debut solo album Sweet Charles: For Sweet People, on Brown's People Records label.
- The Blues Brothers performed the song as the "cold opener" of a November 1978 episode of Saturday Night Live; they later released the song as a single, which reached number nine on the Cash Box Top 100 and number 14 in Billboard in early 1979. It also made #19 in Canada. Cash Box said of it that "Belushi's vocals are honestly effective and decidedly tongue-in-cheek." It was also used as the theme for the late 1990s ABC sitcom Soul Man, which starred Dan Aykroyd.
- The song was performed by Lou Reed and Sam Moore on the soundtrack to the 1986 comedy film Soul Man, supported by a music video. This version reached number 30 in the UK Singles Chart.
- In 1989, the reggae band Los Pericos from Argentina made their cover of the theme for his album Maxi Brites.
- Howard Hewett covered "Soul Man" as a placeholder theme song for Season 2 of the ABC television series Hangin' with Mr. Cooper in 1993, starring Mark Curry. The song was a temporary replacement for the original theme song, which was performed by cast members Holly Robinson and Dawnn Lewis, who left the cast after the end of Season 1 and was ultimately a result of Lewis's departure.
- Ted Nugent often performs "Soul Man" in his live shows, as did Prince during his 2004 Musicology tour.
- In 2004, the song was performed by the comedy duo Drake Bell and Josh Peck on their sitcom, Drake & Josh, in the episode "Blues Brothers". The song appeared on the show's soundtrack, released in 2005.
- In 2007, Australian singer Guy Sebastian covered the song for his fourth album, The Memphis Album, which featured Steve Cropper and Donald "Duck" Dunn, both of whom had performed on the original recording of "Soul Man" 40 years earlier, and both of whom were also members of the Blues Brothers's band.
- In 2012, Jermaine Paul, winner of the second season of The Voice, released it as a single in which he was joined by his mentor and winning coach Blake Shelton. The single reached number 108, appearing in the Bubbling Under Hot 100 Singles.

== Charts ==
=== Weekly charts ===
Sam & Dave

| Chart (1967) | Peak position |
|---|---|
| Canada RPM Top Singles | 2 |
| UK Singles (Official Charts) | 24 |
| US Billboard Hot 100 | 2 |
| US Hot Rhythm & Blues Singles (Billboard) | 1 |
| US Cash Box Top 100 | 1 |

Blues Brothers

| Chart (1978–79) | Peak position |
|---|---|
| Canada RPM Top Singles | 19 |
| US Billboard Hot 100 | 14 |
| US Cash Box Top 100 | 9 |

| Chart (1990) | Peak position |
|---|---|
| Ireland (IRMA) | 21 |
| UK | 79 |

=== Year-end charts ===
| Chart (1967) | Rank |
|---|---|
| Canada | 32 |
| US Billboard Hot 100 | 19 |
| US Cash Box Top 100 | 14 |

| Chart (1979) | Rank |
|---|---|
| Canada | 144 |
| US Cash Box Top 100 | 92 |

== Certifications ==
| Region | Certification | Certified units/sales |
|---|---|---|
| United Kingdom (BPI) | Gold | 400,000^{‡} |
^{‡} Sales+streaming figures based on certification alone.
