= A Little Bit of Good (Cures a Whole Lot of Bad) =

1974 single by Sam & Dave

Single by Sam & Dave

from the album Back at Cha
- B-side: "Blinded By Love"
- Released: 1974
- Genre: Soul
- Label: United Artists
- Songwriters: G. Dalton & K. Dubarri
- Producer: Steve Cropper

Sam & Dave singles chronology
"Don't Pull Your Love" (1971)	"A Little Bit of Good (Cures a Whole Lot of Bad)" (1974)	"Under the Boardwalk" (1974)

"A Little Bit of Good (Cures a Whole Lot of Bad)" a.k.a. "A Little Bit of Good" was a hit on the Hot Soul Singles Chart for soul duo Sam & Dave in 1974.

== Background ==
The song was written by Gary Dalton and Kent Dubarri who were the duo Dalton & Dubarri. It was originally on their Good Head album which was released in 1974. Sam & Dave had their version released on the United Artists label. It marked their getting back together as a duo. Produced by Steve Cropper, it was from their album, Back Atcha which Cropper also produced. It was the only song in the soul section of the Billboard Top Single Picks for May 18, 1974, the reviewer called it the kind of funky song that has always been their trade mark and that with the working of their vocals, it should hit both pop and soul.

== Chart history ==
The single peaked at No. 89 on the Billboard Hot Soul Singles chart during a four-week run.
