= Dave Prater =

American singer (1937–1988)

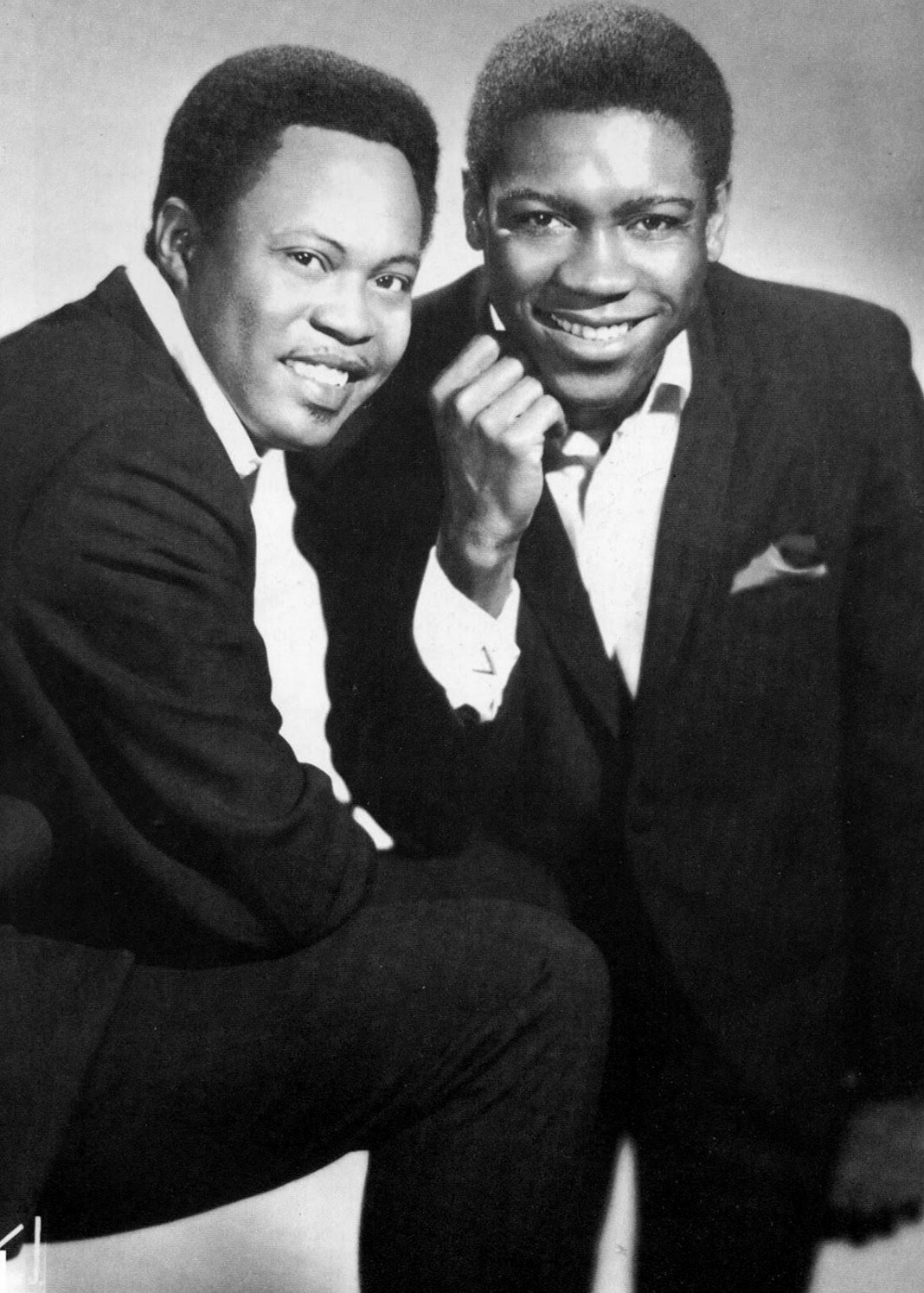
- Sam & Dave, with Prater on right

Background information
- Born: David Prater Jr. May 9, 1937; Ocilla, Georgia, U.S.
- Died: April 9, 1988 (aged 50) Sycamore, Georgia, U.S.
- Genres: R&B
- Occupations: Singer; musician
- Instrument: Vocals
- Years active: 1961–1988
- Formerly of: Sam & Dave

David Prater Jr. (May 9, 1937 – April 9, 1988) was an American Southern soul and rhythm & blues singer and musician, who was the deeper baritone/tenor vocalist of the soul vocal duo Sam & Dave from 1961 until his death in 1988. He is a member of the Rock and Roll Hall of Fame (1992), the Grammy Hall of Fame (1999, for the song "Soul Man"), the Vocal Group Hall of Fame, and the Georgia Music Hall of Fame (1997), and he was a Grammy Award–winning (1967) and multiple Gold Record award-winning recording artist.

== Biography ==
Sam & Dave were the most successful and critically acclaimed duo in soul music history, according to Rolling Stone magazine, and brought the sounds of the black gospel church to pop music with their string of call-and-response hit records. Primarily recorded at Stax Records in Memphis, Tennessee, from 1965 through 1968, these songs included "Soul Man", "Hold On, I'm Coming", "I Thank You", and other Southern soul classics. Other than Aretha Franklin, no other soul act during Sam & Dave's hit-making Stax years (1966–1968) had more consistent R&B chart success, which included 10 consecutive top 20 singles and 3 consecutive top 10 LPs. "Soul Man" has been recognized as one of the most influential songs of the past 50 years by many organizations, including the Grammy Hall of Fame, the Rock & Roll Hall of Fame, Rolling Stone Magazine, and RIAA Songs of the Century. "Soul Man" was used as the soundtrack and title for both a 1986 film and a 1997–1998 television series.

Nicknamed "Double Dynamite" for their energetic and sweaty, gospel-infused performances, Sam & Dave were also considered by critics to be one of the greatest live performing acts of the 1960s. The duo has been cited as a musical influence by numerous artists, including Bruce Springsteen, Michael Jackson, Phil Collins, and Stevie Winwood. The Blues Brothers, and the film of the same name, helped create a major resurgence of popular interest in soul, R&B, and blues music in the 1980s, and the franchise was heavily influenced by Sam & Dave; their biggest hit was their top 20 cover of "Soul Man", and their act and stage show was patterned after Sam & Dave's.

== Early years (1958–1964) ==
The seventh of ten children, Prater was born in Ocilla, Georgia, where he grew up singing gospel music in the church choir, and was a veteran of the gospel group the Sensational Hummingbirds, in which he sang with his older brother, J. T. Prater. Dave Prater met his future partner, Sam Moore, in the King of Hearts Club in Miami in 1961, signing to Roulette Records shortly thereafter. Sam & Dave released six singles for Roulette, including two songs that Prater co-wrote with Moore. Prater was typically featured as the lead vocalist on these records, with Moore typically singing harmony and alternate verses.

== Stax years (1965–1968) ==
They were signed in late 1964 by Jerry Wexler to Atlantic Records, with an agreement that allowed them to record in Memphis with Stax Records. Their first two singles failed to chart, but the duo's November 1965 single, "You Don't Know Like I Know," started a series of ten straight top twenty Billboard R&B hits, including "Hold On, I'm Comin'" (1966), "You Got Me Hummin'" (1966), "When Something Is Wrong with My Baby" (1967), "Soul Man" (1967), and "I Thank You" (1968). Starting with "Hold On, I'm Comin'", Moore was typically given the lead vocal (first verse and lead voice in chorus) on most of their recordings. Prater sang the tenor lead first verse on their only ballad to become a hit single, "When Something Is Wrong with My Baby", demonstrating an impressive vocal range in the upper register.

Their biggest hits were written and produced by Isaac Hayes and David Porter, who worked as songwriters for Stax. Sam & Dave's Stax records also had from the backing of the Stax house band, Booker T. & the M.G.'s, and the Stax horn section, The Mar-Keys. These musicians co-wrote (often without credit) and contributed greatly to the recordings. Sam & Dave's Stax recordings through 1967 were engineered by Stax founder and co-owner Jim Stewart, who created the "Memphis sound" at Stax by recording sessions in a single take. The combination of all of these contributed to the sound and commercial success of Sam & Dave's Stax recordings.

== Atlantic years, solo career, and back with Sam and Dave (1968–1981) ==
Stax and Atlantic severed their distribution agreement in 1968, and as a result Sam & Dave became Atlantic recording artists and were no longer able to work with Hayes, Porter and the Stax musicians. The records made by Atlantic did not have the same sound and feel as the Stax recordings, and most only placed in the lower ends of the music charts if at all. The ending of their association with the Stax record label and their frequently volatile relationship contributed to the break-up of the duo in June 1970.

After the break-up with Sam, Prater went back to their early Miami label, Alston Records, where he recorded one single, "Keep My Fingers Crossed" backed with "Love Business" (Alston A-4596), and also performed sporadically over the next year.

Sam & Dave reunited in August 1971 and performed throughout most of the decade through 1981. They enjoyed a brief resurgence in popularity due to the Blues Brothers's 1979 recording of "Soul Man". Sam & Dave also recorded "Come On, Come Over", which appeared on the debut LP of jazz bassist Jaco Pastorius. Dave also appeared in the Paul Simon movie One Trick Pony as part of Sam & Dave. Their last performance together was on December 31, 1981, at the Old Waldorf in San Francisco.

== The New Sam and Dave Revue (1982–1988) ==
In 1982, Prater started touring with Sam Daniels. This duo was also billed as Sam & Dave. They performed together until Prater's death in 1988. Moore attempted to legally block Prater from using the group's name without his participation and permission, but was generally unsuccessful in stopping the act from performing. The Daniels–Prater incarnation of Sam & Dave played as many as 100 shows per year, including gigs in Europe, Japan and Canada.

In 1985, Prater and Daniels released a medley of Sam & Dave hits newly recorded in the Netherlands, which peaked at number 92 on the R&B chart and was credited to "Sam & Dave". Moore made the label recall the single for using the "Sam & Dave" name without permission, and the record was relabelled and reissued under the name of "The New Sam & Dave Revue".

Prater's last performance with Daniels was on April 3, 1988, at a Stax Reunion show at the Atlanta Civic Center, which also featured Isaac Hayes, Eddie Floyd, and Rufus and Carla Thomas. Six days later, on April 9, 1988, Prater died in a car crash in Sycamore, Georgia, while driving to his mother's house. He was 50 years old.

Prater summed up his thoughts on his career for Gerri Hirshey, who quoted him in her book Nowhere to Run (1984, Southbank Publishing):

I'm a workin' man. Been gettin' down so long. I don't be thinkin' about will I make it up again. Now, what's a music man like me gonna do? What's he do, 'less he entertains till he dies?

— Dave Prater Jr. of Sam & Dave

== Personal life ==
Prater was married to Annie Belle Henderson from March 1962 to November 1969 and had five children with her. During a domestic dispute in 1968, Prater shot and injured his wife. He was not charged for the incident. On December 25, 1969, he married his second wife, Judith T. Gilbert, and remained married to her until his death. Prater was a resident of Paterson, New Jersey, from 1974 until his death in a single-car accident in Sycamore, Georgia, on April 9, 1988. He was buried in Holy Sepulchre Cemetery in Totowa, New Jersey.
