= Sam Moore =

American singer (1935–2025)

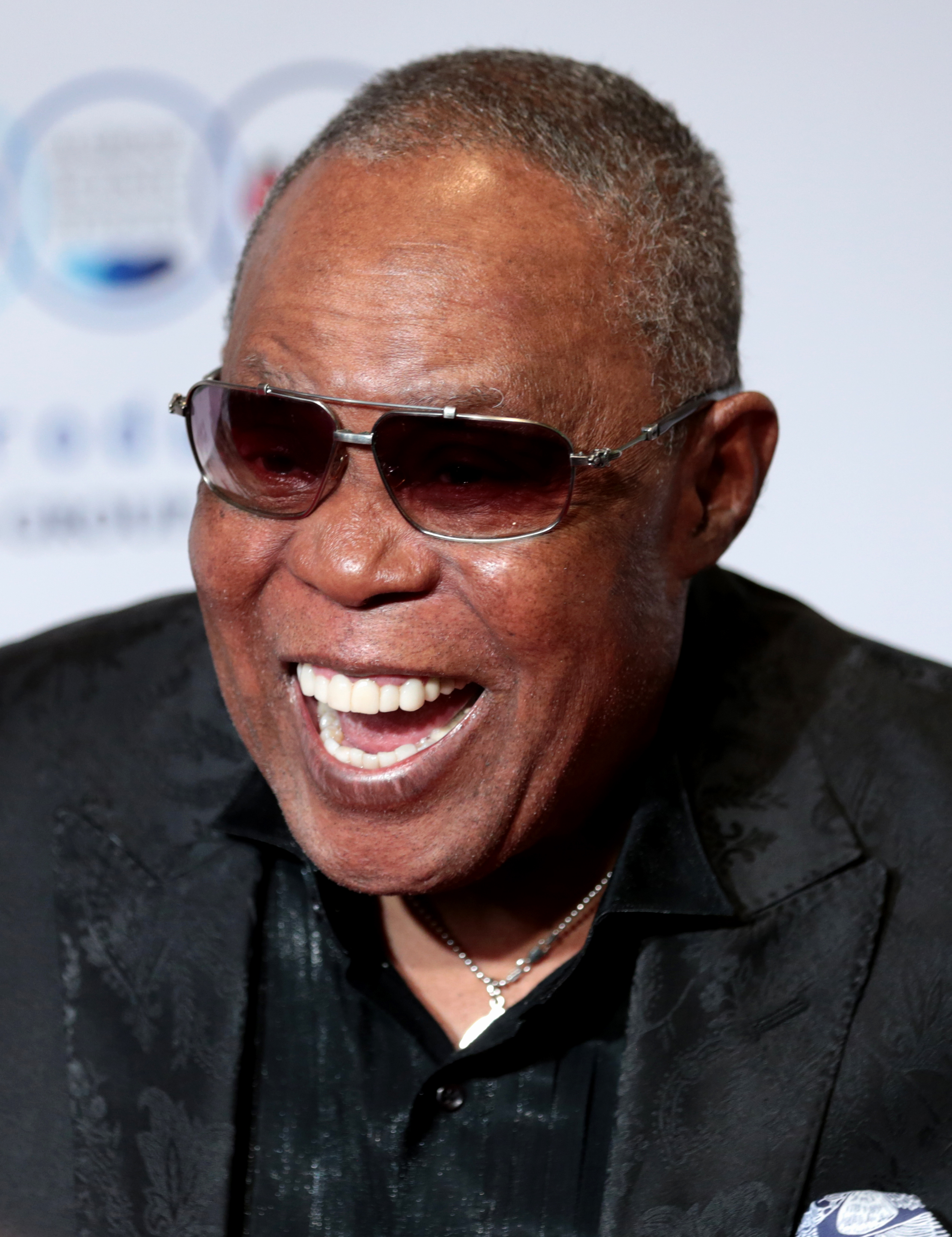
- Moore in 2017

Background information
- Born: Samuel David Hicks; October 12, 1935; Miami, Florida, U.S.
- Died: January 10, 2025 (aged 89) Coral Gables, Florida, U.S.
- Genres: R&B; soul
- Occupations: Singer; songwriter
- Instrument: Vocals
- Years active: 1956–2025
- Formerly of: Sam & Dave; Swanky Modes

Samuel David Moore (October 12, 1935 – January 10, 2025) was an American singer who was best known as a member of the soul and R&B duo Sam & Dave from 1961 to 1981. He was a member of the Rock & Roll Hall of Fame, the Grammy Hall of Fame (for "Soul Man"), the Vocal Group Hall of Fame, and the National Rhythm & Blues Hall of Fame.

== Overview ==
Moore was known for his work as Sam of the soul music duo Sam & Dave, where he was the higher tenor voice. He performed in concerts ranging from the Atlantic Records 40th anniversary party in 1988 to the New Orleans Jazz Festival and the SXSW Music Industry conference in 2006. Moore performed in, among others, a tribute to Elvis Presley in 1994, the Grammy Awards 2006 tribute to Wilson Pickett, and the Kennedy Center Honors in 2006 for Smokey Robinson. He worked with other famous recording artists including Conway Twitty, Bruce Springsteen, Don Henley, Elton John, Phil Collins, Lou Reed, Mariah Carey, Vince Gill, Marty Stuart, and with others in live and recorded performances.

Music critic Dave Marsh, a close friend of Moore and the editor and co-writer of Moore's book, described him in 2002 as "the greatest living Soul singer." In 2006, Moore received a MOBO (Music of Black Origin) lifetime achievement award in the United Kingdom.

== Early life ==
Sam Moore was born Samuel David Hicks on October 12, 1935 in Miami, Florida, the son of John Hicks and Louise (née Robinson). His mother was a teacher. His parents later divorced, and when his mother remarried, Moore took the surname of his stepfather. He is said to have followed the example of his feckless father, who was described as "a tireless womanizer," and while still in school "bedded three of his teachers" and fathered his first child at the age of 16. He survived being shot in the leg by a jealous husband. He also sang in a Baptist church choir and in gospel and doo-wop groups.

== Sam & Dave years ==
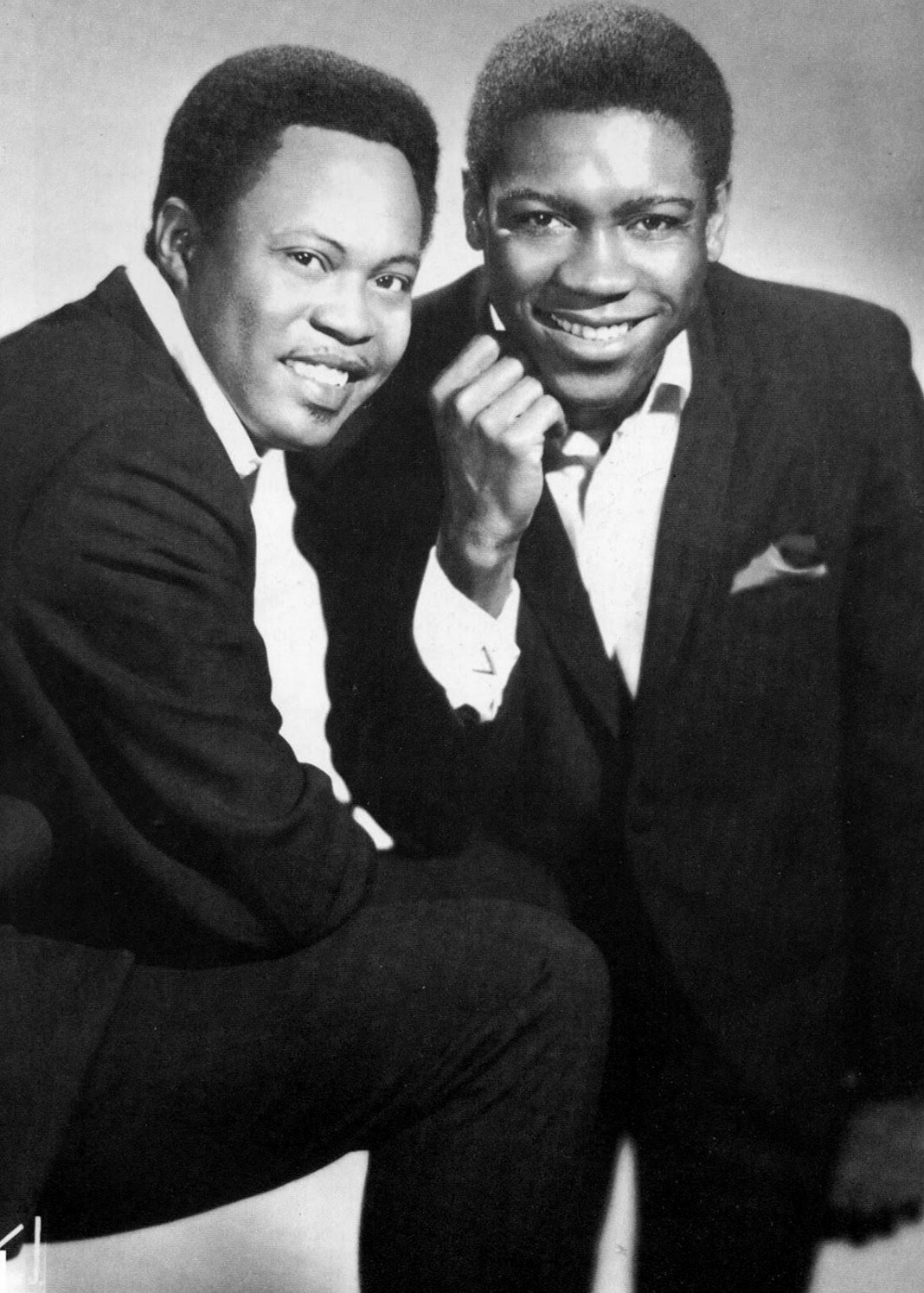
Sam & Dave

Sam Moore and Dave Prater were both experienced gospel music singers, having performed separately with groups the Sensational Hummingbirds and the Melionaires. They met in The King of Hearts Club in Miami in 1961, where they were discovered by regional producer Henry Stone, who signed them to Roulette Records. After modest success at Roulette, they were signed by Jerry Wexler to Atlantic Records in 1964 and were "loaned" out to Stax Records to produce, record, and release their albums. Moore was at first disappointed not to be recording in the label's New York studios, but the Stax style of "gritty funk" turned out to be perfectly suited to their gospel-inspired vocals and enabled them to develop their "southern soul" sound.

The duo's November 1965 single "You Don't Know Like I Know" started a series of 10 straight top-20 Billboard rhythm and blues (R&B) hits that included "Hold On! I'm Comin'" (1966), "You Got Me Hummin' (1966), "When Something Is Wrong with My Baby" (1967), "Soul Man" (1967), and "I Thank You" (1968). "Soul Man," a message of black empowerment written by Isaac Hayes and David Porter, backed by the label's house band Booker T and the MG's, was a huge hit in 1967 and received a Grammy Award for Best R&B Performance. In later years, Moore said the song was about "segregation, subjugation, and liberation." It was covered by many other artists, including James Brown. Most of their hits were written by Hayes and Porter and most of their recordings were backed by Hayes on piano, Booker T and the MG's, and The Memphis Horns.

Between 1965 and 1968, Sam & Dave had a string of further hits, including "You Don't Know Like I Know," "I Thank You," and "Hold On, I'm Comin'." They had a reputation as a high-energy live act to rival Otis Redding, with whom they toured Britain and Europe in 1967, and a history of Stax described them as "double dynamite." At their peak, they had their own airplane, toured with a 16-piece band and an entourage of 35, and averaged 280 shows a year. The ending of their association with the Stax record label and their frequently volatile relationship contributed to their first breakup in 1969. Moore moved to New York's music scene where he was introduced to heroin and cocaine, beginning fifteen years of addiction.

Sam & Dave performed throughout most of the 1970s until 1981, and enjoyed a brief resurgence in popularity after the Blues Brothers' recording of "Soul Man" in 1979. Their last performance together was on December 31, 1981, at the Old Waldorf in San Francisco. On April 9, 1988, Prater died in a car wreck in Sycamore, Georgia.

== Solo career ==
Moore began his solo career after breaking up with Prater in June 1970. He formed a new act called "Sam's Soul Together 1970 Review" featuring singer Brenda Jo Harris and a 16-piece orchestra, and released three singles on Atlantic Records in 1970 and 1971. These singles, along with other recordings made during that period featuring Aretha Franklin on piano, were to be released on an album produced by King Curtis, but in August 1971, Curtis was stabbed to death outside his apartment in Harlem and the project was shelved, to be released 30 years later. Moore reunited with Prater in August 1971 and they performed and recorded together over the next decade.

Moore toured with other soul artists, including Wilson Pickett in Europe in the spring of 1982. In 1982, he married Joyce McRae in Europe, and she became his manager and ordered him into rehabilitation. McRae helped Moore to overcome his lengthy battle with drug addiction, which the couple later described in Moore's book Sam & Dave – An Oral History (1997), co-written with Dave Marsh. After going public with his addiction in 1983, Moore became a strong antidrug advocate and worked as a volunteer for antidrug programs. McRae became his business manager and worked with Sam to advocate for artist's rights, royalties, and pension payments.

Moore said later that finding steady performing work had been difficult for him during much of the 1980s because bookers wanted "Sam & Dave" and he wanted to be a solo artist. Prater hired Sam Daniels in 1982 to perform the "Sam" part for his Sam & Dave act, and this, according to Moore, limited his opportunities to perform as a solo artist. Moore took legal action to stop Prater from using his name, and was successful in obtaining injunctions against him in a few cities and counties. He formed an organization, Artists and Others Against Imposters, and testified before Congress on the subject in 1989.

In 1984, Moore performed on the Don Henley album Building the Perfect Beast in a song called "You're Not Drinking Enough" and on an album by Bruce Springsteen. Springsteen called him "The greatest soul singer of the planet." In 1986, he re-recorded "Soul Man" with Lou Reed for the film of the same name. The song reached number 30 on the UK Singles Chart. In April 1988, he joined the Elwood Blues Revue, which featured Dan Aykroyd and the Blues Brothers Band.

Moore appeared with Junior Walker in the 1988 film Tapeheads, which featured Moore and Walker as legendary soul duo "The Swanky Modes." Sam appeared on Late Night with David Letterman with Junior Walker later that year and performed the song "Ordinary Man" from the film. Their pairing was notable, as it was one of the few instances where performers from the Motown and Stax camps performed or recorded together.

=== 1990–2000 ===
In 1990, Moore toured in Europe with Booker T. & The MG's, Carla Thomas, and Eddie Floyd. One of these performances, from the Monaco Soul Festival, was captured on film and broadcast in France. In 1991, Moore recorded several songs on Red, Hot & Blues with Republican Party official and avid bluesman Lee Atwater. He also was given a Pioneer Award by the Rhythm & Blues Foundation in 1991 to acknowledge his lifetime contributions to music.

Moore and (posthumously) Prater were inducted into the Rock & Roll Hall of Fame on January 15, 1992. Moore brought Hayes and Porter onstage with him at the ceremony to recognize the contributions of his former songwriting and producing partners. He also brought David Prater, Jr., (Dave's oldest son) to the ceremony to acknowledge his former singing partner. Shortly after the induction, Moore announced plans to record a solo LP, featuring duets with Bruce Springsteen, Phil Collins, and others. In 1992, Moore recorded several songs with Springsteen for his Human Touch album. Moore also had a hit in 1994 with the Conway Twitty duet "Rainy Night in Georgia."

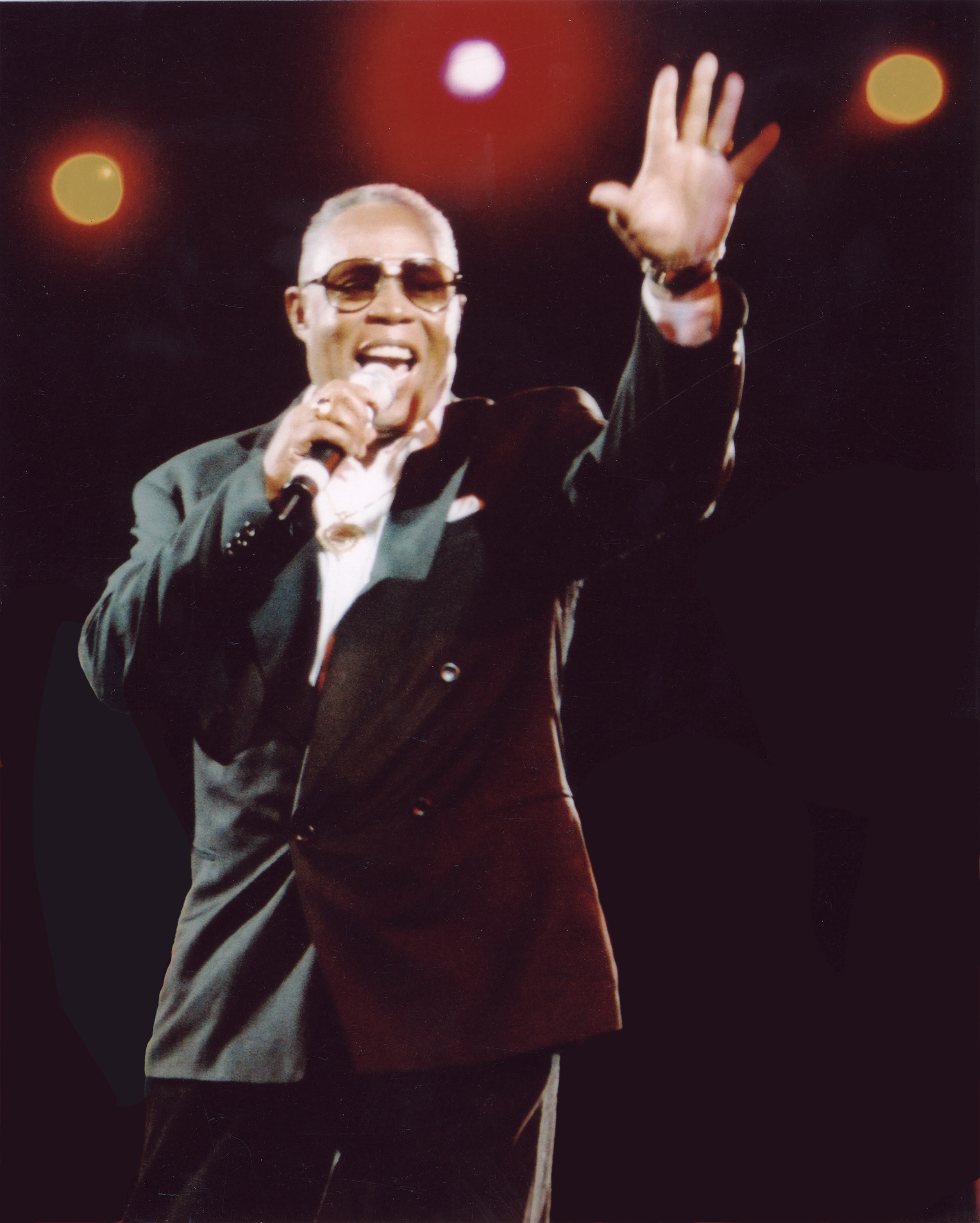
Moore performing in concert.

Moore continued to tour through the 1990s. He released "I'm a Dole Man" in 1996, with the "Soul Man" lyrics rewritten, for presidential candidate Bob Dole to play at voter rallies. The owners of the publishing rights to "Soul Man" did not agree with the claim that it was fair use of the song as a parody, and forced the campaign to stop using it.

In 1998, Moore appeared in the movie Blues Brothers 2000 playing the role of the Reverend Morris, fulfilling a childhood dream of being a preacher, and sang "John the Revelator." In 1999, "Soul Man" was inducted into the Grammy Hall of Fame to recognize timeless classics.

=== 2000–2010 ===
In 2002, Moore's solo album Plenty Good Lovin′, recorded in 1971, but never released, finally reached the record stores. The album was produced by King Curtis and featured Aretha Franklin on piano. It received a four-star review in USA Today. In 2002, Moore starred in the D. A. Pennebaker-directed documentary Only the Strong Survive (Miramax). The film was a selection from both the Cannes and Sundance Film Festivals in 2002, and in the film Moore chronicled his previous drug use.

In 2003, the Stax Museum opened in Memphis. Sam & Dave featured prominently in the film made for the museum, Soulsville, and were honored with a permanent wall display and video display. In December 2004, Rolling Stone named "Soul Man" one of the 500 greatest songs of all time. Moore was a featured guest performer at Bruce Springsteen's 2003 Asbury Park Christmas shows. In the same year, Moore was featured in an episode of the Legends Rock TV Show, produced by Megabien Entertainment.

On August 29, 2006, Moore released his first solo album, Overnight Sensational. The album was produced by Randy Jackson and featured Sting, Mariah Carey, Bruce Springsteen, Jon Bon Jovi, Fantasia, and 20 other guest artists (produced with and available on Rhino Records). Overnight Sensational received positive reviews, most notably for the song "You Are So Beautiful," which featured Moore, Billy Preston, and Eric Clapton, and received a Grammy Award nomination.

In 2008, Moore sent a cease-and-desist letter to the Barack Obama campaign to stop his song "Hold On, I'm Coming" being used at rallies for Obama's presidential campaign. In January 2009, Moore performed with Sting and Elvis Costello at the Creative Coalition's Presidential Inaugural Ball for Barack Obama. In December 2008, Sam & Dave: The Original Soul Men DVD was released in the US, featuring video performances of Sam & Dave from 1966 to 1980.

In February 2009, Moore filed suit against Bob and Harvey Weinstein, the producers of the comedy film Soul Men, claiming that the story was based on the careers of Sam & Dave. The case was dismissed in May 2012, after the judge agreed that "broad similarities" are seen between Moore's life and the film, but noted that Moore was not named or depicted in the film. At the Rock & Roll Hall of Fame's 25th anniversary concert, held at Madison Square Garden on October 29 and 30, 2009, Hall of Fame inductee (1992) Sam Moore performed the Sam & Dave hits "Soul Man" and "Hold On, I'm Comin'" with Bruce Springsteen and the E Street Band.

=== 2010–2025 ===
On November 22, 2013, Moore performed at the tribute concert for George Jones in Nashville's Bridgestone Arena. On April 4, 2014, Sam Moore released "They Killed a King," a tribute song to Dr. Martin Luther King Jr. (1929–1968). Moore re-recorded the song on January 17–18, 2014, at the Royal Studios in Memphis, with Michael Toles, Charles Hodges, Leroy Hodges, Steve Potts, Mark Plati, and Lawrence "Boo" Mitchell. The song was arranged by Lester Snell and produced by Mark Plati and Firmin Michiels. It was written (lyrics and music) in May 1968 by singer-songwriters Bobbejaan Schoepen (Belgium) and Jimmy James Ross (as Mel Turner, born in Trinidad-Tobago). The song was rediscovered after four decades.

On January 19, 2017, Moore sang a rendition of "America the Beautiful" at incoming President Donald Trump's inaugural concert in Washington, DC. Before his performance, Moore stated that he was "honored" to be a part of the ceremony and would not give in to pressure from left-wing activists to cancel his performance. On September 1, 2017, aged 81, Moore performed live at the Royal Albert Hall BBC Proms in London with Jools Holland and his Rhythm & Blues Orchestra in a tribute concert to 50 years of Stax Records. On January 26, 2018, Moore performed "Soul Man" live with Michael McDonald at the NAMM show in Anaheim, California, on the Yamaha Grand Stage.

In 2022, Moore joined Bruce Springsteen on his soul cover album for two songs, "Soul Days" and "I Forgot to Be Your Lover." On April 25, 2023, Moore joined a large cast of country performers honoring George Jones at the Still Playin' Possum concert at the Von Braun Center in Huntsville, Alabama, where he sang "The Blues Man."

== Death ==
Moore died following surgery at a hospital in Coral Gables, Florida, on January 10, 2025, at the age of 89. He was survived by his wife Joyce MacRae, whom he married in 1982, and by his "14 or 15 children by different women".

== Discography ==
=== Studio albums ===
Title	Details	Peak positions
Title	Details	US R&B
Overnight Sensational	Release date: August 29, 2006; Label: Rhino Records; Formats: CD, music download	90

=== Singles ===
Year	Single	Album
2006	"I Can't Stand the Rain"	Overnight Sensational

=== Featured singles ===
Year	Single	Artist	Peak position	Album
Year	Single	Artist	(CAN AC)	Album
1994	"Rainy Night in Georgia"	Conway Twitty	33	Rhythm, Country and Blues

=== Music videos ===
Year	Video	Director
1994	"Rainy Night in Georgia" (with Conway Twitty)	Charley Randazzo

Year	Video
2014	"They Killed a King" (tribute to Dr. Martin Luther King Jr.)
