= Hold On, I'm Comin' (song) =

1966 single by Sam & Dave

"Hold On, I'm Comin'" (officially registered as "Hold On, I'm Coming", and shown on the original single release as "Hold On! I'm Comin'" and "Hold On! I'm a Comin'") is a song first recorded in 1966 by soul duo Sam & Dave, issued in the same year on the Atlantic-distributed Stax label.

== Sam & Dave original version ==
"Hold On, I'm Comin'"

Single by Sam & Dave

from the album Hold On, I'm Comin'
- B-side: "I Got Everything I Need"
- Released: March 1966
- Recorded: 1966
- Genre: Memphis soul
- Length: 2:35
- Label: Stax/Atlantic; S-189
- Songwriters: Isaac Hayes; David Porter
- Producer: Jim Stewart

Sam & Dave singles chronology
"You Don't Know Like I Know" (1965)	"Hold On, I'm Comin'" (1966)	"Said I Wasn't Gonna Tell Nobody" (1966)

=== Background ===
It was written by the songwriting team of Isaac Hayes and David Porter, who came up with the title of the song spontaneously when Hayes was trying to get Porter to hurry out of the Stax Studios restroom and get back to songwriting. The original title was "Hold On, I'm Comin'", but some radio stations objected to its "suggestive nature", and labels on most copies of the single gave the title as "Hold On! I'm A Comin'". Released as Stax 189 in the spring of 1966, the single peaked at number 1 on the Billboard Hot R&B singles chart and at number 21 on the Billboard Hot 100 in the United States.

Following the instrumental introduction, Sam Moore sings the first verse and is joined by Dave Prater for the chorus. Dave sings the second verse and is joined by Sam for the chorus. In the bridge section, Dave sings the first part and Sam sings the second part, which is followed by a brief instrumental passage. Sam sings the third verse and is joined by Dave for the chorus. The introduction is repeated in the chorus, with both Sam and Dave singing until the song fades out.

A revamped version of the song, "Hold On, Edwin's Coming", was recorded by Sam & Dave as a promotional single for Louisiana Governor Edwin Edwards' third election campaign in 1982. Three years later, Dave teamed with new singing partner Sam Daniels as "The New Sam and Dave Review" and recorded "Medley/Hold On, I'm Comin'" for Atlantic Records.

=== Personnel ===
- Vocals by Sam Moore and Dave Prater
- Instrumentation by Booker T. & the M.G.'s and the Mar-Keys Horns

=== Weekly charts ===
Chart (1966)	Peak position
Canada RPM	54
US Billboard Hot 100	21
US Hot R&B/Hip-Hop Songs (Billboard)	1
US Cash Box Top 100	16

==== Year-end charts ====
Chart (1966)	Rank
US Cash Box	90

=== Certifications ===
Region	Certification	Certified units/sales
Japan	—	250,000
New Zealand (RMNZ)	Platinum	30,000^{‡}
United Kingdom (BPI)	Silver	200,000^{‡}
United States (RIAA)	Gold	1,000,000^{^}
^{^} Shipments figures based on certification alone.^{‡} Sales+streaming figures based on certification alone.

== Karen Silver version ==
"Hold On I'm Comin'"

Song by Karen Silver

from the album Hold On I'm Coming'
- A-side: "Hold On I'm Comin'"
- B-side: "Hot Stuff"
- Length: 4:10
- Label: Sklyline SKY 026X
- Songwriters: Isaac Hayes & David Porter
- Producers: John Driscoll & Gino Soccio

Canadian singer Karen Silver recorded a disco version of the song which was a hit on various charts in both Canada and the United States in 1979.

=== Background ===
For her efforts, Karen Silver received a Juno nomination in the Most Promising Female Vocalist category. The song's recording engineer Paul Pagé also received a Juno nomination in the Recording Engineer of the Year category.

=== Reception ===
In his Disco File column for the week of 25 August, Brian Chin referred to the single as a loping synthesizer-based version of the Sam & Dave song. He also wrote that it would be inevitable that parallels would be made with the spring release of "Knock on Wood" but the slower pace of "Hold On I'm Comin'" provided a more natural backbeat and would likely be an easier record for the DJs to handle. He also said to watch out for her excellent album that was coming out in September. It was also reviewed in the 12-inch Discs section of the same issue. The reviewer wrote that the record may remind some of Amii Stewart's version of "Knock on Wood" which were of a similar vintage and character.

It was reported in the 3 November issue of RPM Weekly that Silver's latest single for the Skyline label was made up of two covers. The A side was very rock flavored and given an electronic touch by Gino Soccio. It was getting numerous reports. The B. side, "Hot Stuff" a Ray Parker composition was said to be just as good. Silver's work on the song with producers John Driscoll was said to be great.

=== Canadian Charts ===
For the week of 22 September, "Hold on I'm Comin" debuted at No. 83 in the RPM Weekly 100 Singles chart, and at No. 40 in the RPM Weekly Adult Oriented Playlist chart. At week five, for the week of 20 October, the single peaked at No. 19 on the Adult Oriented Playlist chart and held that position for an additional week. It eventually peaked at No. 72 on the RPM 100 singles chart, and it got to No. 7 on the RPM Dance Music chart.

=== United States charts ===
==== Record World ====
"Hold On I'm Comin'" debuted at No. 50 in the Record World Disco File Top 50 chart for the week of 8 September. At week eight, for the week of 27 October, the single peaked at No. 12.

==== Billboard ====
The single debuted at No. 58 in the Billboard Disco Top 100 chart for the week of 8 September. It eventually peaked at No. 16.

==== Cash Box ====
For the week of 22 September, Silver's single "Hold On I'm Comin' debuted at No. 37 in the Cash Box Top 40 Disco chart. In its sixth charting week, the single peaked at No. 19 for the week of 27 October.

== Other cover versions and samples ==
- Eric Burdon performed the song live on the show Ready, Steady, Go! in 1966. This performance has gained huge popularity over the years, mostly on YouTube. Burdon has since performed it again in his more recent shows.
- Maxine Brown and Chuck Jackson recorded a cover in 1967, which reached number 20 on the Billboard R&B chart and number 91 on the Billboard pop chart.
- Jazz flautist Herbie Mann included a cover version on his 1969 album Memphis Underground. At over eight minutes in length, Mann's interpretation significantly expanded upon the original song's running time, incorporating extended instrumental improvisations and jazz-fusion elements.
- Yugoslav band Mi recorded a cover in 1970, but it remained unreleased until 2005, when it appeared on the box set Kad je rock bio mlad – Priče sa istočne strane (1956-1970) (When Rock Was Young – East Side Stories (1956-1970)), featuring songs by the pioneering Yugoslav rock acts.
- American singer Sidney Barnes recorded a disco version of the song on his album "Foot Stompin' Music" in 1978.
- Bryan Ferry covered the song for his 1978 album The Bride Stripped Bare.
- Boney M. and Precious Wilson covered the song on the former's 1979 album Oceans of Fantasy. Their cover was also released as a single.
- Aretha Franklin covered the song on her 1981 album Love All the Hurt Away. Her rendition earned her a Grammy Award for Best Female R&B Vocal Performance.
- Waylon Jennings covered the song on his 1983 album Waylon and Company.
- A cover version by the Neville Brothers was featured in Money Train (1995) and was also used in trailers for First Kid (1996) and Toy Story 2 (1999).
- B.B. King and Eric Clapton included it on their 2000 collaborative album Riding with the King.
- Welshly Arms covered the song for their Covers EP in 2014. It was used in a promotional trailer for the Quentin Tarantino movie The Hateful Eight (2015), but not in the movie itself.

== See also ==
- List of number-one R&B singles of 1966 (U.S.)
