= Sam & Dave =

American soul and R&B duo

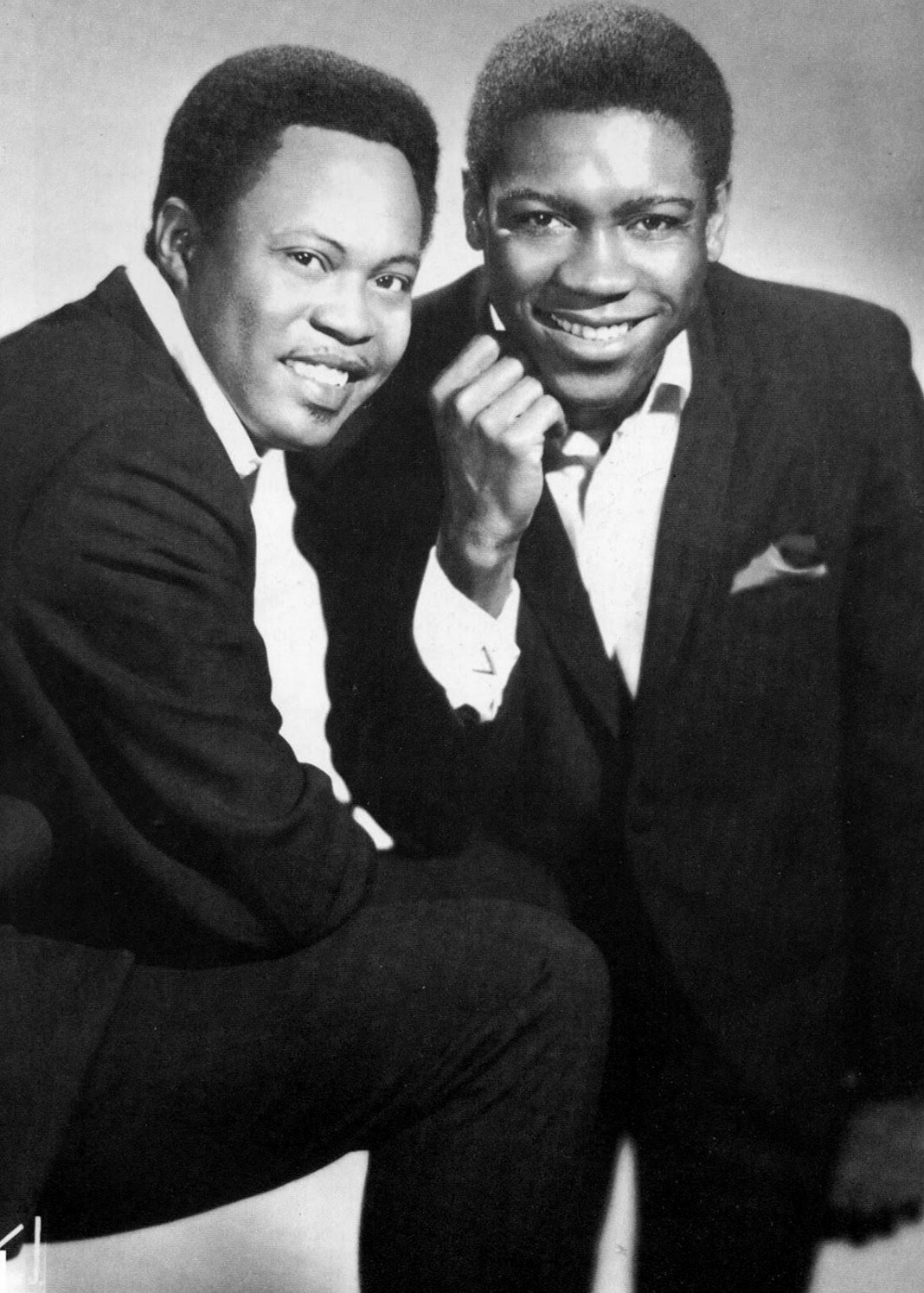
- Sam Moore (left) and Dave Prater (right) in 1967

Background information
- Origin: Miami, Florida, U.S.
- Genres: Soul; R&B; southern soul; rock and roll
- Years active: 1958–1970, 1971–1981
- Labels: Roulette, Stax, Atlantic, Gusto
- Past members: Sam Moore; Dave Prater

Sam & Dave were an American soul and R&B duo who performed together from 1961 until 1981. The tenor (higher) voice was Sam Moore (1935–2025) and the baritone/tenor (lower) voice was Dave Prater (1937–1988).

Nicknamed "Double Dynamite", "The Sultans of Sweat", and "The Dynamic Duo" for their gritty, gospel-infused performances, Sam & Dave are considered one of the greatest live acts of the 1960s. Many subsequent musicians have named them as an influence, including Bruce Springsteen, Al Green, Tom Petty, Phil Collins, Michael Jackson, Steve Van Zandt, Elvis Costello, The Jam, Teddy Pendergrass, Billy Joel, and Steve Winwood. The Blues Brothers, who helped create a resurgence of popularity for soul, R&B, and blues in the 1980s, were influenced by Sam & Dave – their biggest hit was a cover of "Soul Man", and their act and stage show contained many homages to the duo.

According to the Rock & Roll Hall of Fame, Sam & Dave were the most successful soul duo and brought the sounds of the black gospel church to pop music with their call-and-response records. Recorded primarily at Stax Records in Memphis, Tennessee, from 1965 through 1968, these included "Soul Man", "Hold On, I'm Comin'", "I Can't Stand Up for Falling Down", "You Don't Know Like I Know", "I Thank You", "When Something Is Wrong with My Baby", "Wrap It Up", and many other Southern Soul classics. Except for Aretha Franklin, no soul act during Sam & Dave's Stax years (1965–1968) had more consistent R&B chart success, including 10 consecutive top-20 singles and three consecutive top-10 LPs. Their crossover charts appeal (13 straight appearances and two top-10 singles) helped to pave the way for the acceptance of soul music by white pop audiences, and their song "Soul Man" was one of the first songs by a black group to top the pop charts using the word "soul", helping define the genre. "Soul Man" was a number-one Pop Hit (Cashbox: November 11, 1967) and has been recognized as one of the most influential songs of the past 50 years by the Grammy Hall of Fame, the Rock & Roll Hall of Fame, Rolling Stone magazine, and RIAA Songs of the Century. "Soul Man" was featured as the soundtrack and title for a 1986 film and also a 1997–1998 television series, and Soul Men was a 2008 feature film.

Sam & Dave are inductees in the Rock and Roll Hall of Fame, the Vocal Group Hall of Fame, the Memphis Music Hall of Fame, and the Rhythm & Blues Music Hall of Fame. They won a Grammy Award for "Soul Man" and they received the Grammy Lifetime Achievement Award in 2019. Rolling Stone ranked Sam & Dave No. 14 on its list of the 20 Greatest Duos of All Time.

== Early years ==
Sam Moore and Dave Prater's early musical backgrounds involved listening to and singing gospel music in their homes and churches, and in Dave's case, also singing gospel in the choir in his church. Dave later sang with his older brother JT Prater in the gospel group The Sensational Hummingbirds, who recorded "Lord Teach Me" in the 1950s. Sam recorded "Nitey-Nite"/"Caveman Rock" in 1954 with the doo-wop group The Majestics, and later sang with the gospel groups The Gales and The Mellonaires. Moore and Prater listed Jackie Wilson and Sam Cooke as influences on their styles, and Moore was also influenced by Little Willie John, whom he and Dave opened for often in the early 1960s.

Sam & Dave met working the gospel music circuit, and later in small clubs in Miami during amateur nights in 1961 according to Dave. They sang together one night at the King of Hearts club, and started working together immediately thereafter, developing a live act featuring gospel-inspired call-and-response. Soul singer and record producer Steve Alaimo discovered them while performing during the same show with them at the King of Hearts nightclub in Miami and signed them to Marlin Records.

After two singles in early 1962 were released on the local Marlin label owned by Miami's Henry Stone, Stone helped sign them to Roulette Records in New York City. They released six 45s from 1962 to 1964 (two were re-releases of Marlin recordings) with Roulette, and one single on Stone and Alaimo's Alston Label. A few of the singles received regional airplay, but did not achieve national chart success. The songs, some of which were produced by Steve Alaimo and some of which were produced by Henry Glover, were similar in many ways to R&B recordings by Sam Cooke, Jackie Wilson and Little Willie John. Prater was the lead vocalist on most of these singles, with Moore singing harmony and alternate verses.

In summer 1964, Stone introduced the duo to Atlantic Records' Jerry Wexler, who signed them to Atlantic. Wexler asked Memphis, Tennessee-based Stax Records, which Atlantic distributed nationally, to work with Sam & Dave. Wexler wanted the Southern roots and gospel style of their live performances, so the pair were loaned to Stax to record, although they remained Atlantic Records artists. According to Wexler's autobiography Rhythms & Blues, "Their live act was filled with animation, harmony and seeming goodwill. I put Sam in the sweet tradition of Sam Cooke or Solomon Burke, while Dave had an ominous Four Tops' Levi Stubbs-sounding voice, the preacher promising hellfire."

== Stax years (1965–1968) ==
=== Arrival at Stax and early Stax singles ===
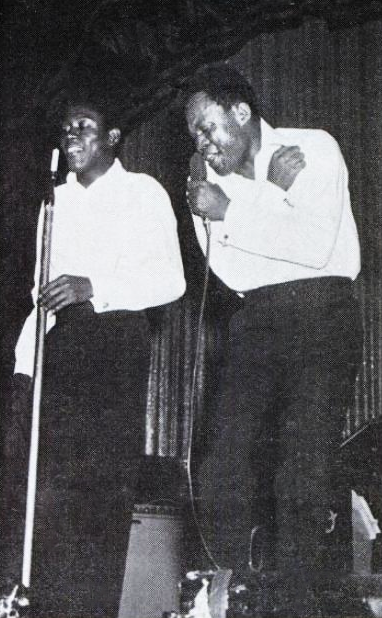
Sam & Dave in 1966

When Sam & Dave arrived at Stax, they worked with producer & engineer Jim Stewart and songwriters including the MGs' guitarist Steve Cropper, who wrote or co-wrote four of their first eight recordings. The duo then moved to relative newcomer writers and producers Isaac Hayes and David Porter. Hayes and Porter wrote and produced the duo's biggest hits (although they did not receive production credits until the Soul Men LP and singles). According to Moore and Prater, they also greatly influenced the duo's singing style, and shifted their recording style from the style of their Roulette records to a more live, more energetic gospel, call-and-response feel and beat driven soul style the group is known for today.

Sam & Dave's Stax records also benefited from the musicians and engineering at Stax. The Stax house band, Booker T. & the M.G.'s, and the Stax horn section, The Mar-Keys, were world-class musicians who co-wrote (often without credit) and contributed to recordings—the same musicians who recorded with Otis Redding, Wilson Pickett, Carla Thomas and other soul artists. Sam & Dave's Stax recordings through 1967 were engineered by Stax founder Jim Stewart, who created the Memphis Sound by recording live in a single take. Stewart is credited for instrumental mixes that allowed for instrumental separation and the distinct contribution of each instrument to the overall feel of the song.

While the first two Stax singles failed to chart, the third, the Hayes/Porter composition (with similarities, including the title, to a gospel standard) "You Don't Know Like I Know" hit No. 7 R&B in 1966. This was the first of 10 consecutive top-20 R&B chart hits over three years, and 14 R&B chart appearances during their career.

=== "Hold On, I'm Comin'" single and Hold On, I'm Comin' LP ===
"Hold On, I'm Comin'" (R&B No. 1 / Pop No. 21), released in March 1966, was a R&B hit for Sam & Dave, and also their first single to break into the pop chart. The song was named the No. 1 song of the year for 1966 by the Billboard R&B charts, and spent 20 weeks on the R&B charts in 1966, peaking at No. 1 in June. In 1988, Rolling Stone named it one of the best 100 songs of the past 25 years. "Hold On, I'm Comin'" received a belated RIAA gold record for one million sales in 1995, 29 years after its release. "Hold On, I'm Comin'" has since been recorded by dozens of other artists.

"Hold On, I'm Comin'" was also the first recording on which Moore took lead on the first verse and Prater was given the response role and second verse at Hayes and Porter's suggestion. The duo used this format (singing dual leads) on most of their songs. The song was created when Hayes called to Porter, who was in the bathroom. Porter supposedly said "Hold on, man. I'm comin'," and Hayes and Porter wrote the song within 10 minutes. "Hold On, I'm Comin'", when released, received objections from radio stations over the suggestive title. This resulted in a name change by Stewart and quick re-recording and re-release, and nearly all the original U.S. copies of the single bear the title "Hold On, I'm A-Comin'".

The LP Hold On, I'm Comin' (4/66) reached No. 1 for 19 weeks on the R&B album charts in 1966. After Sam & Dave's chart success, Roulette quickly released the album Sam & Dave in 1966 as well, a collection of the A & B sides of their six Roulette 45s, which did not chart.

=== When Something is Wrong, Double Dynamite LP and singles ===
Sam & Dave's next huge R&B hit was "When Something is Wrong With My Baby", their only ballad single, which was released in January 1967. Stax author Rob Bowman called this "One of the most sublime records in soul music's history," and The Mar-Keys trumpet player Wayne Jackson called it the greatest song he has ever heard. This was the only Sam & Dave hit where Dave sang the first verse solo; their other hits started with Sam & Dave together or Sam singing the first verse. "When Something is Wrong With My Baby" has since become an often recorded and performed duet for male and female singers performing together.

The duo also charted in late 1966 with the top 10 R&B hits "Said I Wasn't Gonna Tell Nobody", and "You Got Me Hummin". These three singles, along with other tracks, were compiled on Double Dynamite (12/66), Sam & Dave's second LP on Stax. The LP peaked at No. 7 R&B and No. 118 Pop.

=== "Soul Man" single and Soul Men LP ===
Sam & Dave's biggest hit and best-remembered song, "Soul Man" (R&B No. 1/Pop No. 2), was released in August 1967. It was the number No. 1 song in the US according to Cashbox magazine Pop charts in November 1967. Sam & Dave won the Grammy Award in 1967 for "Best Performance – Rhythm & Blues Group" for "Soul Man", their first gold record. "Soul Man" was voted into the Grammy Hall of Fame in 1999. The song helped name the emerging music genre as "Soul Music". According to co-writer Isaac Hayes, the title was inspired by news reports of soul pride that emerged after the 1967 race riots, where stories that painting the word "soul" on your door was a message for looters to bypass your house. Hayes-Porter extrapolated that to "I'm a soul brother, I'm a soul man.". It has been recognized as one of the best or most influential songs of 50 years by the Grammy Hall of Fame, The Rock & Roll Hall of Fame, Rolling Stone, and R.I.A.A. Songs of the Century. "Soul Man" was used as the soundtrack and title for a 1986 film, a 2008 film Soul Men, a 1997–1998 television series. In 2019, "Soul Man" was selected by the Library of Congress for preservation in the National Recording Registry for being "culturally, historically, or aesthetically significant".

The Soul Men LP (October 1967) was Sam & Dave's third Stax LP (R&B No. 5/Pop No. 68). Musicologist Rob Bowman called Soul Men "One of the greatest soul music albums of all time." "Don't Knock It" from the LP was released as a single in France, but other songs were not released as U.S. singles due to the long run by "Soul Man" on the Pop charts (15 weeks), by which time "I Thank You/Wrap It Up" was ready for release. "May I Baby", the B-side of "Soul Man", is also regarded as a classic song on the LP by Whitburn's "Top Pop Singles" guide, and was a popular live song performed frequently by Sam & Dave.

=== "I Thank You" single and I Thank You LP ===
In 1968, Sam & Dave again charted with the gospel-inspired "I Thank You/Wrap It Up" (R&B No. 4/Pop No. 9). Critics commented that the B-side "Wrap It Up" could have been a separate successful single, which it later became for The Fabulous Thunderbirds. Because the duo were so busy touring, Hayes & Porter traveled to Europe to record the vocal track on "Wrap It Up" in order to release the single. Due to the end of the distribution agreement between Stax and Atlantic Records in May 1968, "I Thank You" was Sam & Dave's final single on Stax. Although they continued to work at Stax with Hayes/Porter, as of May 1968, the duo's work was released on Atlantic Records. "I Thank You" sold over one million copies, earning it gold record status.

Sam & Dave's first 1968 single for Atlantic was "You Don't Know What You Mean to Me", written by Eddie Floyd and Steve Cropper (R&B No. 19 / Pop No. 48). Sam & Dave said it was their favorite of their songs. Sam & Dave also released "Can't You Find Another Way (of Doing It)" (No. 20 R&B / No. 54 Pop), but it was not included in the I Thank You LP. Their final single of 1968, "Everybody Got to Believe in Somebody", charted in the lower levels of the pop charts and ended Sam & Dave's streak at 10 straight R&B top 20 singles.

Though on Atlantic, the I Thank You LP included 1968 singles initially on both Stax and Atlantic. The LP peaked at No. 38 on the R&B charts, and was the only LP of their Stax recordings not to chart on the Pop LP charts.

=== Sam & Dave's live performances ===
In March 1967, Sam & Dave were co-headliners for the Stax/Volt Revue in Europe, which included Booker T & the MGs, The Mar-Keys, Eddie Floyd, Carla Thomas, Arthur Conley and headliner Otis Redding. It was the duo's first trip to Europe. Although Redding headlined the tour, many agreed Sam & Dave stole the show on many nights. A live version of "Soothe Me" from Sam & Dave's Double Dynamite LP was recorded in Paris during the 1967 tour. Released as a single in mid-1967, it continued Sam & Dave's string of top 20 U.S. R&B hits and was their first in the UK Top 40.

After the tour, Sam & Dave worked as headliners in the U.S. and in Europe during Fall 1967, Fall 1968 and January 1970, and in Japan in 1969 and 1970. They averaged 280 shows per year from 1967 through 1969 and in 1967, they only took ten days off. Other high points included headlining the Montreal World's Fair in 1967, performing at the tribute to Martin Luther King, Jr. at Madison Square Garden in June 1968, being the first black soul act to headline the Fillmore East in December 1968, and headlining the Texas International Pop Festival for two nights in August 1969. Sam & Dave also performed on U.S. and European television, including two appearances on The Ed Sullivan Show in 1969, appearing on The Tonight Show and American Bandstand in 1967, and performing on The Mike Douglas Show in 1969 and 1970.

== The Atlantic Records years (1968–1972) ==
=== Best of LP, Stax-recorded singles (1969) ===
The year 1969 started well, with the Atlantic release of The Best of Sam & Dave LP in January. It contained all of their Stax A sides except "A Place Nobody Can Find" and several B-sides, and peaked at No. 24 on the R&B LP charts and No. 89 on the Billboard LP charts. Their first single of the year, "Soul Sister, Brown Sugar", returned Sam & Dave to the R&B top 20, and was a No. 15 hit in the UK. The follow-up "Born Again", reached the lower levels of the charts, and was the last single Sam & Dave recorded at Stax.

=== Atlantic produced records, first break-up, and reunion (1969–1972) ===
Jerry Wexler with co-producer Tom Dowd tried producing Sam & Dave in New York, with Atlantic songwriters and musicians. It took eight months to issue "Ooh, Ooh, Ooh", the first Atlantic single in August 1969. It was not a very good record, by Sam's own admission, and it represented the first time in four years that a Sam & Dave single failed to chart.

Two more singles followed in 1970, "Baby, Baby, Don't Stop Now", and "One Part Love, Two Parts Pain". The first was a leftover Hayes-Porter recording from Stax; the second was produced by Wexler and Dowd in New York, and was written by Stax executive Al Bell and Allen Jones. Both failed to chart. According to Wexler, "We just made some shit-ass records with them. I never really got into their sensibilities as a producer." Wexler then sent the duo south to Muscle Shoals and Miami to work with producers Brad Shapiro and Dave Crawford for their next single "Knock It Out The Park", which also failed to chart.

Sam & Dave split in June 1970, according to Moore, as a result of his dissatisfaction with the duo and his desire to pursue a career solo. According to Prater, they broke up because "[Moore] decided to do what he wanted to do on his own." Moore performed with his own revue in 1970. He recorded three solo singles (none of which charted) for Atlantic over the next year and was preparing an album produced by King Curtis, which was shelved after Curtis was stabbed to death in 1971. Prater recorded a single for Alston. Neither was commercially successful as a solo act, and they reunited in August 1971.

In October 1971, their last Atlantic single, "Don't Pull Your Love", was a cover of a hit by Hamilton, Joe Frank & Reynolds. This Shapiro/Crawford production was a minor hit (R&B No. 36/Pop No. 102), but not a substantial enough commercial success to keep the duo signed to the label. Sam & Dave recorded four final songs for Atlantic in August, 1972, none of which was released by the label. Their contract with Atlantic expired shortly thereafter.

== Later years (1972–1981) ==
Despite inability to attract a major label after Atlantic, there was still demand for public performances, especially in Europe. They toured Turkey in Spring, 1972 and England in Spring, 1973. Sam & Dave also continued to be visible in the U.S., performing on TV shows including The Midnight Special and The Mike Douglas Show. According to Sam, most U.S. shows in the 1970s were small clubs, oldies shows, and whatever they could get. He attributed their poor bookings during this period to rumors of drug use and bad blood between the duo.

Sam & Dave returned to the studio in 1974 and 1975, recording an album of new songs titled Back at Cha for United Artists. The album – their first album of new material in 7 years – was produced by Steve Cropper, and featured the MGs and The Memphis Horns and had a minor R&B single, "A Little Bit of Good" (R&B No. 89). Songwriters included Cropper, Allen Toussaint, and Jimmy Cliff. Although the LP received positive reviews, it failed to chart. In a side project, they provided vocals on "Come On, Come Over" for Jaco Pastorius for his debut album on Epic in 1976.

In 1976–77, Sam & Dave recorded songs in the UK with producer John Abbey. Two singles were released on Abbey's Contempo label in the UK and Germany, with limited success. Ironically, given the duo's disputes, one of the last singles by Sam & Dave was a cover of The Beatles "We Can Work It Out". Sam & Dave also briefly retired in 1977, with Dave working at a Pontiac dealership in New Jersey and Sam working at an Austin, Texas, law firm as a process server.

In 1978, Sam & Dave re-recorded old hits for the LP Sweet & Funky Gold (Gusto), and re-recorded songs and other soul hits during this period in Nashville for an album for K-Tel Records, The Original Soul Man. In Summer, 1978, they toured Germany for two weeks.

In 1979, Sam & Dave enjoyed a significant resurgence of interest as a result of Dan Aykroyd's and John Belushi's sketch characters The Blues Brothers, and the comic actors' 1979 top-40 cover of "Soul Man". Moore stated they were offered an opportunity to perform onstage with Belushi and Aykroyd on SNL but turned it down when Belushi said Sam & Dave had to perform the intro, then the Blues Brothers would take over. According to an April 1988 interview with Aykroyd in the Chicago Sun-Times, Aykroyd saw Sam & Dave as a teenager at the Montreal Expo in 1967 and said they were one of his biggest influences for creating The Blues Brothers. Aykroyd convinced director John Landis to include the Jake and Elwood Blues characters listening to "Hold On, I'm Comin'" and "Soothe Me" while riding in the Bluesmobile in the 1980 film The Blues Brothers as a tribute to Sam & Dave.

Also in 1979, Sam & Dave opened shows for The Clash on their U.S. tour, including at the Palladium in New York City. In 1980, the duo performed in Paul Simon's film One Trick Pony and, finally, on Saturday Night Live. In 1980, they also were featured in a U.S. tour opening for the 1950s revival band Sha Na Na.

In 1981, they re-recorded many hits along with Sam Cooke and Otis Redding covers for LPs titled Soul Study Vol. 1 and Soul Study Vol. 2 (Odyssey). The pair last performed on New Year's Eve, 1981, at the Old Waldorf in San Francisco. According to Moore, when they walked off stage it was the last time they spoke to each other.

== Dave Prater and Sam Daniels (1982–1988) ==
In 1982, Prater started touring under the "Sam & Dave" name or as "The New Sam & Dave Revue" with Sam Daniels, who performed with Dave from October 1982 until Dave's death in 1988. Moore attempted to block Prater from using the group's name, but was largely unsuccessful. The Daniels & Prater incarnation played 100 shows per year over the next seven years, including in Europe, Japan and Canada.

In 1983, Sam & Dave called on J.C. "Billy" Davis to put together a band to back them at a concert at Pine Knob, in Clarkston, Michigan where they were opening for James Brown.

In 1985, Prater and Sam Daniels released a newly sung medley of Sam & Dave hits recorded in The Netherlands, which peaked at No. 92 on the R&B chart and was credited to "Sam & Dave". Sam Moore got the record company to recall the single for using the "Sam & Dave" name without permission, and the record was re-labelled and re-issued by "The New Sam & Dave Revue".

Prater last performed with Sam Daniels on April 3, 1988, at a Stax Reunion at the Atlanta Civic Center, which also featured Isaac Hayes, Eddie Floyd, and Rufus and Carla Thomas. Six days later, on April 9, 1988, Prater died in a car crash in Sycamore, Georgia while driving to his mother's house.

== Sam Moore solo career (1982–2025) ==
Moore continued to perform and record as a solo artist, and also performed in numerous duets with other popular artists, until his death on January 10, 2025.

== Conflict between Moore and Prater ==
Sam & Dave were known for having a very tumultuous partnership during most of their 21 years together. According to Moore, they did not speak to each other offstage for almost 13 years. During the 1970s, they broke up many times, and typically would show up separately for shows, require separate dressing rooms, not look at each other onstage, and communicate through intermediaries. They also had performances in the 1970s where only one of them would show up, leading to the eventual departure of Moore, and the continuation of the name "Sam & Dave" by Prater pairing with vocalist Sam Daniels. Moore describes personal issues with Prater, including drug use, touring fatigue, and a desire to do his own act with new material as contributing to their break-up and replacement of Dave. Prater attributed their rift and break-ups to Moore's frustrations in wanting to do his own act and diversify from repeatedly performing the Sam & Dave song catalog (which Prater has said that Moore did not like very much).

== Covers by other artists/use in pop culture ==
Sam & Dave songs have been recorded by other artists, including 29 covers of "Hold On, I'm Comin'". Others who charted with Sam & Dave songs include ZZ Top – "I Thank You", The Fabulous Thunderbirds – "Wrap It Up", James & Bobby Purify – "I Take What I Want", Linda Ronstadt (featuring Aaron Neville) – "When Something Is Wrong with My Baby", Chuck Jackson & Maxine Brown – "Hold On, I'm Comin'", Elvis Costello – "I Can't Stand Up for Falling Down", and Lydia Pense & Cold Blood – "I Take What I Want". A diverse group of other successful artists also recorded Sam & Dave covers, including: Aretha Franklin, Peter Frampton, The Temptations, Bonnie Raitt, Jackie Wilson, Eurythmics, Rory Gallagher, Tom Jones, The Band, Martha Reeves & the Vandellas, Michael Bolton, Patti LaBelle & Travis Tritt, Bryan Ferry, Marilyn McCoo & Billy Davis Jr., The Hollies, Paul Butterfield, Taj Mahal, Guy Sebastian, and Eric Clapton & B.B. King.

In 2003, the Stax Museum of American Soul Music opened in Memphis, and Sam & Dave are in the film made for the museum, titled Soulsville, and they have a permanent wall-and-video display.

Barack Obama used "Hold On, I'm Comin'" as a theme song on the campaign trail until Sam Moore requested that he stop using it. Eleven months later, Sam Moore performed "Soul Man" with Sting and Elvis Costello at one of Obama's inaugural parties. A parody of "Soul Man" created by Moore, "I'm a Dole Man", was used in the 1996 Bob Dole presidential campaign until the copyright owners objected and requested the campaign stop using it. Sam & Dave released the rare single "Hold On, Edwin's Coming" in 1982 to support Louisiana Governor Edwin Edwards' third run for governor. Another parody, "I'm a Suns Fan", was recorded by Moore and used for the Phoenix Suns basketball games.

Sam & Dave songs have been used frequently in movie and TV soundtracks and commercials, including "Hold On, I'm Comin'" on the soundtrack of the 2007 hit film American Gangster. "Hold On, I'm Comin'" and "Soothe Me" played on the radio and 8 track player (album titled: "The Best of Sam & Dave") in the Bluesmobile during the 1980 hit movie The Blues Brothers. "A Place Nobody Can Find" was used in the background of a scene in HBO's series The Wire. Jay Leno used "Hold On, I'm Comin" while driving his AC Cobra on his 2009 Super Bowl commercial to announce his show's move to a new time. "Wrap It Up" was used as a transition to commercial break for The O'Reilly Factor. "Soul Man" was used as the title and title track in the 1986 movie featuring C. Thomas Howell, and also the 1997–1998 television series featuring Dan Aykroyd. The movie Tapeheads, released in 1988 and starring John Cusack and Tim Robbins, featured Sam Moore and Junior Walker as a fictitious, legendary soul duo called The Swanky Modes.

The movie Soul Men, released in November 2008, was a comedy featuring Bernie Mac and Samuel L. Jackson as two feuding soul singers called "The Real Deal". In February 2009, Moore filed suit against the film production company (The Weinstein Company) and the producers for infringing on the marks "Soul Man" and "Soul Men", claiming the movie is based on the careers of Sam & Dave, and damaged both Moore's reputation and career. The suit was dismissed on summary judgment in May 2012.

== Discography ==
- 1966: Hold On, I'm Comin' (Stax) (POP No. 45, R&B No. 1)
- 1966: Double Dynamite (Stax) (POP No. 118, R&B No. 7)
- 1967: Soul Men (Stax) (POP No. 62, R&B No. 5)
- 1968: I Thank You (Atlantic) (R&B No. 38)
- 1975: Back at Cha (United Artists)
