= David Porter (songwriter) =

American songwriter (born 1941)

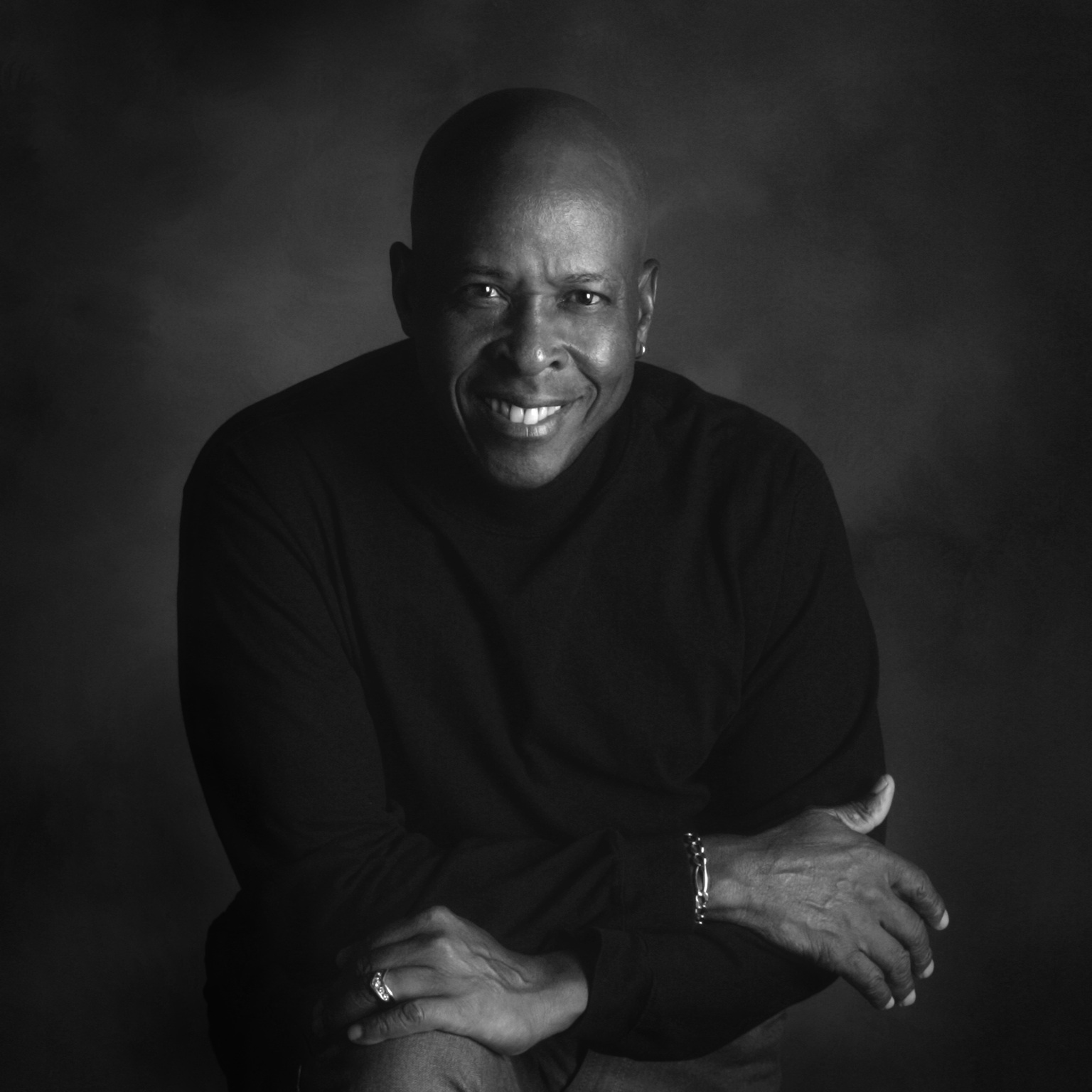
- Porter in 2005

Background information
- Born: November 21, 1941 (age 84)
- Origin: Memphis, Tennessee, U.S.
- Genres: R&B; soul
- Occupations: Songwriter; record producer; businessman
- Years active: 1962–present
- Labels: Enterprise; Stax

David Porter (born November 21, 1941) is an American songwriter. He was a 2005 inductee into the Songwriters Hall of Fame, with catalog sales exceeding 400 million units. In 2015, Rolling Stone listed him among the 100 Greatest Songwriters of All Time. He co-wrote Sam & Dave's "Soul Man" (1968 Grammy winner) and "Hold On, I'm Comin'", among others. His songs have been sampled in Mariah Carey's "Dreamlover" (1993 Grammy nominee), Will Smith's "Gettin' Jiggy wit It" (1999 Grammy winner), and The Notorious B.I.G.'s "Who Shot Ya?".

Porter has over 1,700 songwriter and composer credits for a range of artists, including Aretha Franklin, James Brown, Celine Dion, Otis Redding, Drake, ZZ Top, Tom Jones, Ted Nugent, Bonnie Raitt, Wu-Tang Clan, Eminem, Patsy Cline, Albert King and Eurythmics.

He is also the founder of the Memphis-based Consortium MMT, a nonprofit organization seeking to develop the music industry in Memphis.

== Biography ==
=== Early life ===
Porter was the ninth of 12 children born to James and Corean Porter in Memphis, his second oldest brother was COGIC Bishop W. L. Porter (1925–2009). Porter's career began in music after singing in church, school, Memphis venues and competitions, often with close friend and classmate Maurice White, who later founded Earth, Wind and Fire. Porter graduated from Booker T. Washington High in 1961 and later attended LeMoyne College. While still a high-school student working at a grocery across from Satellite Records, he went over to find if the label would consider recording soul music.

After meetings with Chips Moman, Porter became active at Satellite as a songwriter. With this role, Porter arranged for his friends and classmates to record for the Satellite label, including Booker T. Jones, William Bell, and Andrew Love. Soon after, Satellite rebranded as Stax Records and redefined their focus to become a soul music label.

=== Stax career ===
Porter was the first staff songwriter at Stax Records and developed his skills in A&R and songwriting. In Porter's A&R capacity, he signed acts including The Emotions, Homer Banks, The Soul Children and was a catalyst for bringing in Isaac Hayes as a writing partner. As house composers for Stax Records, Porter and Hayes penned most of Sam & Dave's hits, including "Soul Man", "I Thank You", "When Something Is Wrong with My Baby" and "Hold On, I'm Comin'". They also wrote material for Carla Thomas ("B-A-B-Y"), Johnnie Taylor ("I Got to Love Somebody's Baby" and "I Had a Dream"), and The Soul Children. Starting in the late 1960s, Hayes became increasingly focused on his own recording career, eventually leading to the end of the songwriting partnership. The Hayes-Porter duo composed 200 songs during their collaboration.

Porter then began recording his own albums for Stax. He did a single for Stax itself in 1965, "Can't See You When I Want To", a remake of which became a Top 30 R&B hit for Porter. He cut several albums for Stax in the early 1970s, including a concept LP, Victim of the Joke? which includes an upbeat cover of The Beatles' "Help!". Also, he released on other labels under the pseudonyms Little David and Kenny Cain.

Porter began working with songwriting partner Ronnie Williams, and later went on to engineer the brief relaunch of the Stax label in 1978, after the bankrupt label's assets were acquired by Fantasy Records. He and Hayes received Pioneer Awards from the Rhythm and Blues Foundation in 1999.

=== Songwriters Hall of Fame ===
On June 9, 2005, Porter was inducted into the Songwriters Hall of Fame alongside Bill Withers, Steve Cropper, Robert B. Sherman, Richard M. Sherman, John Fogerty, and his longtime writing partner Isaac Hayes.

=== The Consortium MMT ===
In 2012, Porter founded The Consortium MMT, a 501(c) non-profit with the goal of developing a viable music industry in Memphis through structured teaching, experience and mentorship. Porter was awarded the 2013 Governor's Arts Award for his achievements including the founding and success of The Consortium MMT venture.

== Awards, honors and positions ==
=== Awards and honors ===
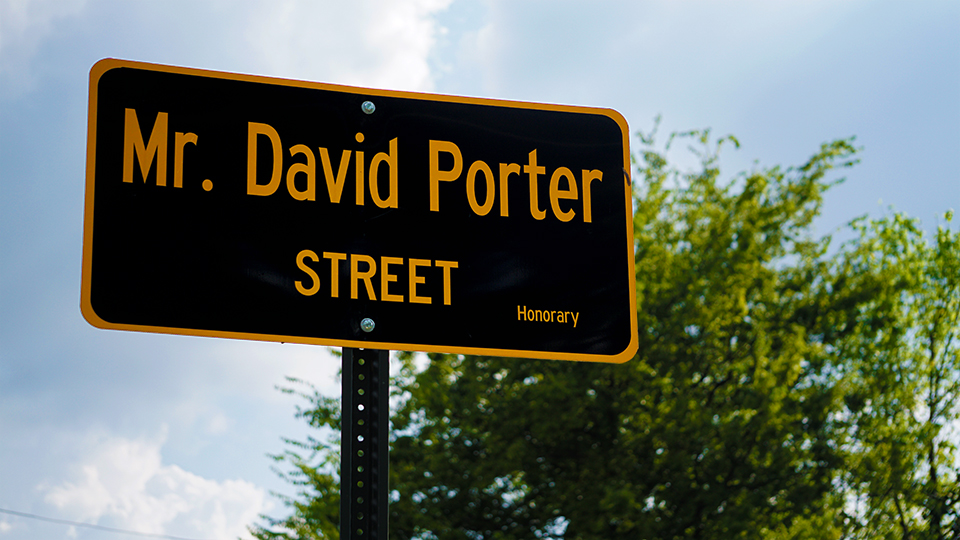
David Porter Street in Memphis, TN

- Songwriters Hall of Fame Inductee
- Rolling Stone 100 Greatest Songwriters of All Time
- Mr. David Porter Street honorary in Memphis, Tennessee
- Grammy Awards and Nominations (various, over a 50-year span)
- RIAA Certified One-Million Sales Award, Soul Man by Sam & Dave
- Broadcast Music, Inc., Citation of Achievement 1969, Soul Man
- Broadcast Music, Inc., Citation of Achievement, Dreamlover 1st Award
- Broadcast Music, Inc., Citation of Achievement, Dreamlover 2nd Award
- Broadcast Music, Inc., Citation of Achievement, Gettin' Jiggy Wit It
- Broadcast Music, Inc., Pop Award
- Rhythm and Blues "Pioneer Award" Winner, 1999
- The University of Memphis "Distinguished Achievement Award" In the Creative and Performing Arts, 1992
- The University of Memphis Board of Trustees Award, 2008
- The National Academy of Recording Arts and Sciences Award of Appreciation
- 2013 Governor's Arts Award (awarded on basis of arts achievements and work with the Consortium MMT)

=== Boards, commissions and entrepreneurship ===
- Chapter President and National Trustee, The National Academy of Recording Arts and Sciences
- Chairman, Memphis/Shelby County Film, Tape and Music Commission
- Member of the Board, Youth Villages
- Trustee, University of Memphis Board of Visitors
- Member of the Board, State of Tennessee Film/Music Commission
- Member of the Board, TPC annual PGA golf event benefiting St. Jude Hospital
- Member of the Board, Orpheum Theatre (Memphis)
- Member of the Board, Memphis State Music Advisory Board
- Director, Bank of Bartlett
- Owner, Da Blues (blues club) at Memphis International Airport
- Owner, IPR Records
- Owner, Robosac Music, LLC (music publishing company)
- Investor, Xsite (Memphis, Little Rock)
- Investor/Partner B.B. Kings Blues Club (Memphis, Los Angeles)

== Stax-era discography (1965–74) ==
=== Songwriting and production with Isaac Hayes ===
- 1965: "Candy", by The Astors
- 1965: "You Don't Know Like I Know", by Sam & Dave
- 1966: "Let Me Be Good to You", by Carla Thomas
- 1966: "B-A-B-Y", by Carla Thomas
- 1966: "Your Good Thing (Is About to End)", by Mabel John
- 1966: "Hold On, I'm Comin'", by Sam & Dave
- 1967: "When Something Is Wrong with My Baby", by Sam & Dave
- 1967: "Soul Man", by Sam & Dave
- 1968: "I Thank You", by Sam & Dave
- 1969: "So I Can Love You", by The Emotions (production only)
- 1969: "The Sweeter He Is", by The Soul Children
- 1969: "Soul Sister Brown Sugar", by Sam & Dave

=== Albums ===
All albums issued on Stax Records' Enterprise label.

- 1970: Gritty, Groovy, & Gettin' It
- 1971: ...Into a Real Thing
- 1973: Victim of the Joke? An Opera
- 1974: Sweat & Love

=== Singles ===
All singles issued on Stax Records' Enterprise label unless otherwise noted.

- 1965: "Can't See You When I Want To" b/w "Win You Over" (Stax)
- 1970: "One Part Love, Two Parts Pain" b/w "Can't See You When I Want To"
- 1971: "If I Give It Up, I Want It Back [Pt. I]" b/w "If I Give It Up, I Want It Back [Pt. II]"
- 1972: "Ain't That Loving You (for More Reasons Than One)" b/w "Baby I'm-a Want You" (with Isaac Hayes)
- 1972: "I'm Afraid the Masquerade Is Over" b/w "Hang On Sloopy"
- 1972: "When the Chips Are Down" b/w "I Wanna Be Your Somebody"
- 1973: "Long as You're the One Somebody in the World" b/w "When You Have to Sneak, You Have to Sneak"
- 1974: "I Got You and I'm Glad" b/w "Falling Out, Falling In"
