= Memphis soul =

Music genre

- Stylistic origins: Southern soul; gospel music; soul music; rhythm and blues; blues
- Cultural origins: 1960s; Memphis, Tennessee (United States)
- Derivative forms: Funk

Other topics
- Stax Records

Memphis soul, also known as the Memphis sound, is the most prominent strain of Southern soul. It is a shimmering, sultry style produced in the 1960s and 1970s at Stax Records and Hi Records in Memphis, Tennessee, featuring melodic unison horn lines, organ, guitar, bass, and a driving beat on the drums.

Many of the songs in this style were performed by vocalists backed by the house bands of Stax, Hi and Goldwax Records. Memphis soul sound is different from the Motown sound from Detroit or the lighter sound of Chicago soul. After the rise of disco in the late 1970s, Memphis soul declined in popularity. The Stax Museum of American Soul Music is dedicated to preserving the Memphis sound.

== Overview/Memphis Soul ==
Soul music is an emotional genre that began by expression of the struggles within the African American community. Soul is similar to genres like Motown or Rhythm and Blues but is unique because of its tonality and origin. Memphis musicians Willie Mitchell and Al Green collaborated to produce the basic sound of all soul music to emerge from Memphis. To this day, the entire genre of Memphis soul music is in accordance with their perfected sound of the 70s.

== Characteristics ==
Memphis soul pulls stylistic influence from jazz, Motown, Rhythm and blues, gospel and Doo-wop music. There is often a call and response between the lead vocalist and chorus. Other characteristics of Memphis soul include handclaps, funky rhythms, catchy melodies, and invigorating body movement by the performer. Brass and saxophones are common in much of Memphis soul instrumentation.

Memphis soul is unique due to its uptown influence on Southern regional soul music. Soul was originally written by and for the black community in Memphis but eventually became popular across all racial groups. Soul was experimental and new. It transformed greatly from the 50s into the 70s. Soul is the backbone of all American music genres today. Soul music directly influenced Rock music in America.

== Memphis Soul Record Labels ==
=== Stax Records ===
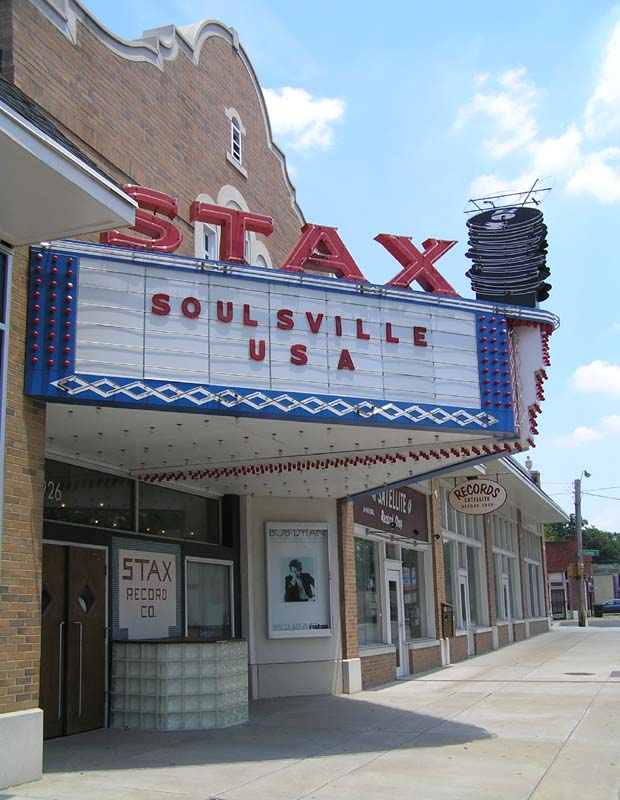
Stax Records

Jim Stewart and Estelle Axton converted an old movie theater into a recording studio at the corner of McLemore Avenue and College Street in Memphis, Tennessee. The studio was opened under the name, "Satellite Records", which was eventually changed to "Stax". Stax was one of the most successfully integrated companies in the country—from top management and administration to its artists. Former WDIA disc jockey Rufus Thomas and his daughter Carla recorded the label's first hit, "Cause I Love You." Soon after, The Mar-Keys, a local R&B group that included Estelle's son, Packy Axton, recorded "Last Night"(1961).

For the next 14 years, Stax Records launched the careers and recorded hits for the likes of Johnnie Taylor, The Dramatics, Soul Children, the Staple Singers, Bar-Kays, Albert King, Eddie Floyd, Carla Thomas, Booker T. and the MGs, Otis Redding, Sam & Dave, Luther Ingram, and Isaac Hayes. Of the approximately 800 singles and 300 LPs recorded at Stax, there were 166 Top 100 songs in the pop charts and 265 Top 100 hits in the R&B charts, nine of them Grammy winners.

Al Bell eventually joined the label, becoming a co-owner of Stax Records in 1968. With 200-plus employees, Stax was one of the largest African-American-owned businesses in the United States in its time. Because of this, there was a large amount of influence from the African-American community, influencing the sound of Memphis soul music. By 1970, both Stax and Hi Records (described below) had African-Americans included in ownership. Under the leadership of Al Bell, the label became one of the first to evolve into a multimedia company, producing spoken-word recordings and the acclaimed documentary film Wattstax, recording an event known to many as the "Black Woodstock". The documentary featured performances by Luther Ingram, Isaac Hayes, Rufus and Carla Thomas, the Bar-Kays and the Staple Singers, along with the comedian Richard Pryor. It also included interviews on the 1965 Watts revolt.

The Stax rhythm section was the epitome of the label's integration. The M.G.'s represented racial harmony in Memphis during the Civil Rights era. Composed of Booker T. Jones, Steve Cropper, Donald "Duck" Dunn and Al Jackson, Jr., Booker T. & the M.G.'s provided the instrumental backing for Rufus and Carla Thomas, Sam and Dave, and many other artists, The group also recorded under its own name, including the instrumental hit "Green Onions". In later years, members of the group pursued their own individual careers. Jones worked with the singer and producer William Bell and co-wrote the blues classic "Born Under a Bad Sign". Cropper supervised the recordings of Otis Redding and co-wrote hits with Wilson Pickett and Eddie Floyd.

=== Hi Records ===
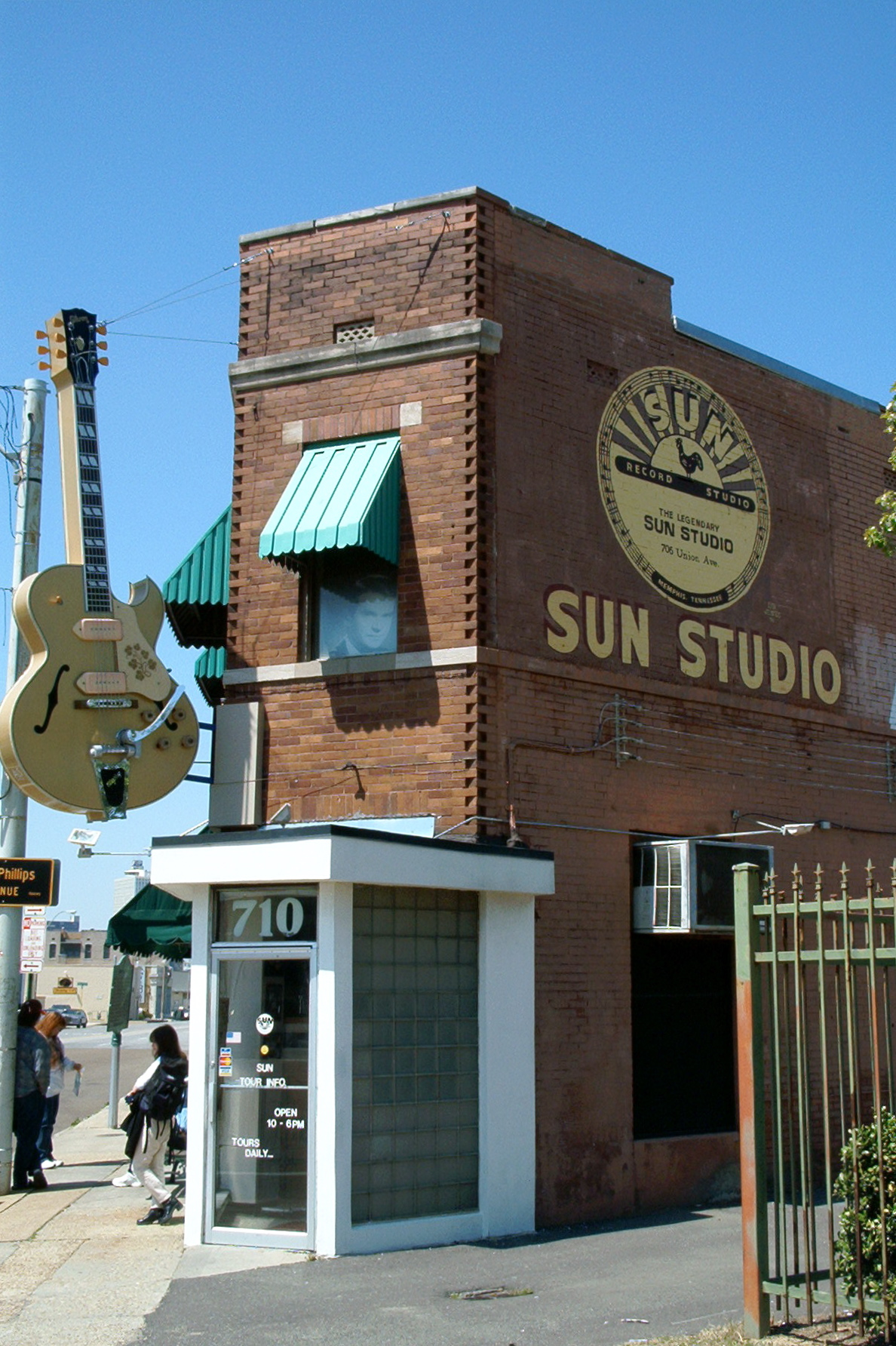
Sun Studio Memphis

Hi Records was started by a trio of Sun Studio musicians—Ray Harris, Bill Cantrell and Quinton Claunch—and Joe Cuoghi, one of the owners of Poplar ("Pop") Tunes, a local record store, Hi Records' early releases were primarily rockabilly. While the label had success with this sound, rockabilly was declining in popularity, as was Hi Records. Finally, the label had its first hit, courtesy of Harris' friend, Bill Black.

Just as The Mar-Keys "Last Night" grew Stax Records, the success of Bill Black's Combo changed Hi from a rockabilly label to an instrumental powerhouse during the early 60s. But as the decade wore on, Hi Records once again recognized a shift in the musical landscape, and, with the leadership of the producer, bandleader and songwriter Willie Mitchell, evolved into a successful soul music label.

The soul label first emerged on the national scene with Ann Peebles. Approached by Mitchell after an impromptu performance at the Rosewood Club, Peebles hit the charts in 1969 with "Walk Away" followed by "Part Time Love. She recorded "I Can't Stand the Rain" in 1974, which became one of John Lennon's favorites.

After a chance encounter on tour in Texas, Al Green joined Willie Mitchell and Hi Records, and together they became the preeminent source for soul music in the 1970s. With hits such as "Tired of Being Alone," "Let's Stay Together" and "Take Me to the River," Green established a permanent identity and a sound for Hi Records, based around a house band which became known as the Hi Rhythm Section.

Mitchell made a name for Hi Records by working with a number of big soul artists (such as Ike and Tina Turner) who were associated with other record labels.

=== Goldwax Records ===
Quinton Claunch was a hardware store owner who had previously worked as a country music guitarist, session musician at Sun Records, songwriter and record producer, and had co-founded Hi Records in 1957 before selling his stake two years later. Russell was a pharmacist who was interested in becoming involved in the music business.

The label had its biggest successes with James Carr, who had a series of hits on the R&B chart between 1967 and 1969, including "You've Got My Mind Messed Up" and "The Dark End of the Street". It also had some success with The Ovations, Spencer Wiggins, and Wee Willie Walker. The label was dissolved in 1969, as a result of differences between Claunch and Russell as well as Carr's erratic behaviour. In the mi

Notable Memphis Soul Artists

- Booker T. & the M.G.'s
- Carla Thomas
- Eddie Floyd
- Johnnie Taylor
- Otis Redding
- Rufus Thomas
- Soul Children
- Al Green
- Don Bryant
- O.V. Wright
- Otis Clay
- Ann Peebles
- Quiet Elegance
- Syl Johnson
- Bill Black's Combo
- Willie Mitchell
- James Carr
- The Ovations

== See also ==
- American Sound Studio
- FAME Studios
