= A Man Needs a Woman =

Studio album by James Carr
- Released: 1968
- Genre: Deep soul Southern soul Country soul
- Label: Vivid Sound; Goldwax; Kent
- Producer: Quinton M. Claunch, Rudolph V. Russell

James Carr chronology
You Got My Mind Messed Up (1966)	A Man Needs a Woman (1968)	Take Me to the Limit (1991)

Professional ratings
Review scores
Source	Rating
Allmusic	4.5/5 stars
Allmusic (re-release)	4.5/5 stars

A Man Needs a Woman is a 1968 album by James Carr. This would be the last of Carr's albums until his come-back album Take Me to the Limit in 1991.

After Carr's death in 2001, Kent Records re-released the album with several bonus tracks in 2003.

The tracks "The Dark End of the Street" and "You've Got My Mind Messed Up" were previously included on Carr's first album You Got My Mind Messed Up.

== Track listing ==
1. "A Man Needs a Woman" (O. B. McClinton) – 2:49
2. "Stronger Than Love" (Clarence Shields) – 2:31
3. "More Love" (Wayne Carson Thompson) – 1:59
4. "You Didn't Know It But You Had Me " (Dolly Greer, George Jackson) – 1:59
5. "A Woman Is a Man's Best Friend" (Quinton Claunch, Rudolph V. "Doc" Russell) – 3:33
6. "I'm a Fool for You" (Earl Cage, Claunch, Greer, Jackson, Russell) – 2:00
7. "Life Turned Her That Way " (Harlan Howard) – 2:38
8. "Gonna Send You Back to Georgia" (J. Hammonds Jr., Johnnie Mae Matthews) – 2:17
9. "The Dark End of the Street" (Chips Moman, Dan Penn) – 2:34
10. "I Sowed Love and Reaped a Heartache" (D. Lee, A. Reynolds) – 2:27
11. "You've Got My Mind Messed Up" (McClinton) – 2:27

=== 2003 bonus tracks ===
1. "A Losing Game" (James Carr, Denny Weaver) – 2:01
2. "A Message to Young Lovers" (Claunch, Russell) – 2:44
3. "Let It Happen" (Spooner Oldham, Dan Penn) – 2:38
4. "You Gotta Have Soul" () – 1:49
5. "You Hurt So Good" () – 2:00
6. "I Can't Turn You Loose" () – 2:08
7. "Let's Face Facts" (Lee Jones, Harold Thomas) – 2:26
8. "Who's Been Warming My Oven" (Mack Vickery) – 3:19
9. "Please Your Woman" () – 3:43
10. "Your Love Made a U-Turn" () – 2:15
11. "The Lifetime of a Man" () – 2:26
12. "Tell Me My Lying Eyes Are Wrong " () – 2:46
13. "Ring of Fire" (June Carter Cash, Merle Kilgore) – 2:57
