= The Great Otis Redding Sings Soul Ballads =

Studio album by Otis Redding
- Released: March 1965
- Recorded: February 6, 1964 – January 20, 1965
- Genre: Soul; R&B
- Length: 32:18
- Label: Volt/Atco
- Producer: Jim Stewart; Booker T. & the MG's

Otis Redding chronology
| Pain in My Heart (1964) | The Great Otis Redding Sings Soul Ballads (1965) | Otis Blue/Otis Redding Sings Soul (1965) |

The Great Otis Redding Sings Soul Ballads, simply referred to as Soul Ballads or Sings Soul Ballads, is the second studio album by the American soul singer-songwriter Otis Redding, released in 1965. The album was one of the first issued by Volt Records, a sub-label of Stax Records, and Redding's first on the new label. Like Redding's debut Pain in My Heart (1964), Soul Ballads features both soul classics and originals written by Redding and other Stax Records recording artists. The recording sessions took place at the Stax studios in Memphis. The album features a stereo mix by engineer Tom Dowd, replacing the early mono mix.

The album features the Booker T. & the M.G.'s, the Memphis Horns, and Isaac Hayes on piano, who possibly first appeared on this album, although this is disputed, as he was not credited on the liner notes. Unlike Redding's debut album, Sings Soul Ballads was released both on Atlantic's subsidiary Atco Records and Stax's Volt Records. While the album and its singles were moderately successful on the music charts, it includes Redding's first top ten single, "Mr. Pitiful". The album received mixed critical reception.

== Recording ==
The recording session took place at the Stax studios in Memphis. Guitarist Steve Cropper and Stax producer Jim Stewart both agreed with engineer Tom Dowd's decision to install a two-track recorder during the recording of "Mr. Pitiful". The stereo four-input Ampex mixer is used throughout the album, which means that the instrumentation is either in one channel or the other, but the vocals and echo are in only one channel. This is different for mono recordings, where only one channel is used. Sings Soul Ballads features Booker T. & the M.G.'s organist Booker T. Jones, pianist/guitarist Steve Cropper, bassist Donald "Duck" Dunn, drummer Al Jackson, Jr., and the Memphis Horns, consisting of trumpeter Wayne Jackson, tenor saxophonist Charles "Packy" Axton and baritone saxophonist Floyd Newman. The album contains twelve songs, the majority of which are, as the title implies, soul ballads.

The album opens with "That's How Strong My Love Is". Written by Roosevelt Jamison and altered by Cropper, the song was first performed by O. V. Wright on Goldwax Records, where it was cut by both Jamison and Wright. Redding's version was released days after the original. The Rolling Stones covered the song shortly afterwards and included it on their album Out of Our Heads (released in July 1965). Isaac Hayes made his debut as a pianist with Otis Redding, possibly on songs "Come to Me" or "Security". It is unclear because prior to 1966, the Memphis Musicians Union kept little or no session documentation; Fantasy Records, who bought Stax in 1977, has none at all prior to 1966. That Hayes debuted in 1964 with Redding is known; which song remains in question. "Come to Me", Redding's fourth Volt single, was written by Redding and Phil Walden and became the second song after the Volt session not to feature a horn section. The song is a typical 6/8 ballad and features piano triplets, including an organ. The single peaked at No. 69 on Billboard's Hot 100 chart.

"Mr. Pitiful" was recorded in December 1964 at the Stax studios. The song was written by both guitarist Steve Cropper and Redding, and was their first collaboration. It was inspired by and written as a response to a statement made by radio disc jockey Moohah Williams, who had nicknamed Redding "Mr. Pitiful" for sounding pitiful when singing ballads. Cropper heard about this and, while taking a shower, got the idea it would make a good song. In the car on the way to the studio, Cropper proposed the idea with a melody already in mind, humming it to Redding. By the time they reached the studio, the song was written and they recorded it in two or three takes. It was released as a single with the B-side "That's How Strong My Love Is". The song became a hit and the album's most successful track, peaking at No. 10 on the Billboard R&B and at No. 41 on Billboard Hot 100 chart.

== Release ==
Sings Soul Ballads was released in March 1965, with four of the songs from the album chosen to be released as singles. Unlike Redding's first studio album, Pain in My Heart, the album was released both on Atlantic's subsidiary Atco Records and Stax's Volt Records. A remastered CD and CS version was released by Atco on the Elektra label in 1991. Rhino/Atlantic issued a digital download release in the MP3 format on July 29, 2008.

== Reception ==
Professional ratings
Review scores
| Source | Rating |
|---|---|
| Allmusic | 3/5 stars |
| RS Album Guide | 5/5 stars |
| Encyclopedia of Popular Music | 4/5 stars |
| Record Mirror | 4/5 stars |

Sings Soul Ballads received mixed critical reception. Lindsay Planer from Allmusic gave a mixed review of the album. While she liked "That's How Strong My Love Is", Chuck Willis' "It's Too Late", "For Your Precious Love" (previously a hit by The Impressions), Sam Cooke's "Nothing Can Change This Love", and Cropper's/Redding's "Mr. Pitiful", she was less enthusiastic about "Chained and Bound", "I Want to Thank You" and "A Woman, a Lover, a Friend", which mimic aspects of Cooke's sound. The second was compared with "Another Saturday Night", the latter with "Everybody Loves to Cha Cha Cha". She gave the album three of five stars. The Rolling Stone Album Guide, on the other hand, gave the album five stars.

== Track listing ==
Side one
| No. | Title | Writer(s) | Length |
|---|---|---|---|
| 1. | "That's How Strong My Love Is" | Roosevelt Jamison | 2:24 |
| 2. | "Chained and Bound" | Otis Redding | 2:25 |
| 3. | "A Woman, a Lover, a Friend" | Sidney Wyche | 3:18 |
| 4. | "Your One and Only Man" | Redding | 2:48 |
| 5. | "Nothing Can Change This Love" | Sam Cooke | 2:59 |
| 6. | "It's Too Late" | Chuck Willis | 3:00 |

Side two
| No. | Title | Writer(s) | Length |
|---|---|---|---|
| 7. | "For Your Precious Love" | Arthur Brooks, Richard Brooks, Jerry Butler | 2:49 |
| 8. | "I Want to Thank You" | Redding | 2:35 |
| 9. | "Come to Me" | Redding, Phil Walden | 2:38 |
| 10. | "Home in Your Heart" | Otis Blackwell, Winfield Scott | 2:10 |
| 11. | "Keep Your Arms Around Me" | Obie McClinton | 2:46 |
| 12. | "Mr. Pitiful" | Steve Cropper, Redding | 2:26 |
| Total length: | | | 32:18 |

== Personnel ==
Credits are taken from The Great Otis Redding Sings Soul Ballads's liner notes.

=== Musicians ===
- Otis Redding – vocals
- Booker T. Jones – keyboards, organ, piano
- Steve Cropper – guitar, keyboards, piano
- Johnny Jenkins – guitar
- Donald Dunn – bass guitar
- Al Jackson Jr. – drums
- Wayne Jackson, Sammy Coleman – trumpet
- Packy Axton – tenor saxophone
- Floyd Newman – baritone saxophone

=== Production ===
- Paul Ackerman – liner notes
- Yves Beauvais – reissue producer
- Loring Eutemey – artwork
- Dan Hersch – remastering
- Bill Inglot – remastering
- Jim Stewart – production

== Charts ==
=== Album ===
| Chart | Peak position |
|---|---|
| Billboard Pop chart | 147 |

=== Singles ===
| Song | Chart | Peak position |
|---|---|---|
| "Chained And Bound" | Billboard R&B chart | 70 |
| "Come To Me" | Billboard R&B chart | 69 |
| "Mr. Pitiful" | Billboard Pop chart | 41 |
| "Mr. Pitiful" | Billboard R&B chart | 10 |
| "That's How Strong My Love Is" | Billboard Pop chart | 74 |
| "That's How Strong My Love Is" | Billboard R&B chart | 18 |
