= You Got My Mind Messed Up =

Studio album by James Carr
- Released: 1967
- Genres: Deep soul, Southern soul, country soul
- Length: 29:33 (original); 60:44 (2002 reissue)
- Labels: Goldwax; Kent (re-release)
- Producer: Rudolph V. "Doc" Russell

James Carr chronology
You Got My Mind Messed Up (1967)	A Man Needs a Woman (1968)

Singles from You Got My Mind Messed Up
- 1. "She's Better Than You" Released: September 1965; 2. "You've Got My Mind Messed Up" Released: February 1966; 3. "Love Attack" Released: June 1966; 4. "Pouring Water On a Drowning Man" Released: September 1966; 5. "The Dark End of the Street" Released: January 1967

Professional ratings
Review scores
Source	Rating
Allmusic (original)	5/5 stars
Mojo	(favorable)
Allmusic (re-release)	5/5 stars

You Got My Mind Messed Up is a 1967 album by James Carr. Although Carr is not as well-known as his contemporaries such as Otis Redding or Aretha Franklin, "You Got My Mind Messed Up" has been cited as one of the top soul music albums of all time. Allmusic gave it 5 stars from two different reviewers. On the 2002 re-release Mojo magazine stated "This is undoubtedly one of the greatest soul albums of all time." (10/02, p.118).

After Carr's death in 2001, Kent Records re-released the album with another dozen bonus tracks.

== Track listing ==
1. "Pouring Water on a Drowning Man" (Drew Baker, Dani McCormick) – 2:40
2. "Love Attack" (Quinton Claunch) – 2:54
3. "Coming Back to Me Baby" (George Jackson) – 1:59
4. "I Don't Want to Be Hurt Anymore" (Dolly Greer) – 2:24
5. "That's What I Want to Know" (James Carr, Roosevelt Jamison) – 1:56
6. "These Ain't Raindrops" (Claunch) – 2:35
7. "The Dark End of the Street" (Chips Moman, Dan Penn) – 2:34
8. "I'm Going for Myself" (Ernest Johnson, Edgar Campbell) – 2:25
9. "Lovable Girl" (O. B. McClinton) – 2:24
10. "Forgetting You" (McClinton) – 2:54
11. "She's Better Than You" (McClinton)– 2:22
12. "You've Got My Mind Messed Up" (McClinton) – 2:25

=== 2002 bonus tracks ===
1. "These Arms of Mine" (Otis Redding) – 2:37
2. "You Don't Want Me" (Roosevelt Jamison) – 2:11
3. "There Goes My Used to Be" (Jamison) – 2:32
4. "A Lucky Loser" (Homer Banks, Allen Jones) – 2:07
5. "Dixie Belle" (Jerry Foster, Wilburn Rice) – 2:23
6. "Search Your Heart" (Jackson, Raymond Moore) – 3:04
7. "Sock It to Me, Baby!" (Lawrence Brown, Bob Crewe) – 2:14
8. "My Adorable One" (Irral Ida Berger, Clara A. Thompson) – 3:29
9. "Love Is a Beautiful Thing" (Edward Brigati, Felix Cavaliere) – 2:46
10. "Life Turned Her That Way" (Harlan Howard) – 2:58
11. "A Losing Game" (James Carr, Denny Weaver) – 2:02
12. "What Can I Call My Own" (Larry Rogers) – 2:47

== Charts ==
United States

Year	Chart	Peak Position
1967	Black Albums	#25
