= Eddy Giles =

American blues singer-songwriter (1938–2019)

Elbert Giles (March 17, 1938 – February 5, 2019), professionally known as Eddy Giles (sometimes also billed as Eddie Giles or Eddy "G" Giles), was an American R&B, blues and gospel singer-songwriter and musician, perhaps best known for his 1966 song, "Losin' Boy". Despite never achieving a mainstream success, he was a significant contributor to Southern soul, the genre made famous by artists such as Rufus Thomas, Carla Thomas, Eddie Floyd, O. V. Wright, Otis Redding, and Sir Charles Jones.

Giles was born in Frierson, Louisiana, in 1938, and was raised by his grandmother, Mary Wiggins, on a farm. While still in his senior year, he relocated to live with his mother in Shreveport, Louisiana, and graduated from Booker T. Washington High School in 1958. Giles was a self-taught musician, and he learned to play guitar. In a 2015 interview with The Shreveport Times, he said his music influences were Elvis Presley and Chuck Berry.

The song "Losin' Boy", written by Giles, was issued as a single in 1966, with "I Got The Blues" on the B-side. The single, released on the Shreveport-based Murco Records, did not enter the Billboard Hot 100, but peaked at number 27 on the Bubbling Under Hot 100 chart the following year. The single did not make it into the U.S. Billboard R&B chart. Despite its poor chart performance, it sold 2,000 units in Shreveport, 10,000 in Dallas, and 70,000 in Chicago. He and his band, called Eddie Giles and the Jive Five, toured the country extensively, performed with Ike and Tina Turner. In Chicago, their concerts were opened by young Jimi Hendrix.

Giles kept on writing songs and releasing new singles. His next singles, "While I'm Away" b/w "Eddy's Go-Go Train", "Happy Man" b/w "Music", "Soul Feeling Part 1" b/w "Soul Feeling Part 2", and "Love With A Feeling" b/w "Baby, Be Mine", all written by Giles and released through Murco label, did not chart.

After his career in music, he graduated from the United Theological Seminary and Bible College in Monroe, Louisiana, in 1996. In 2002, he was awarded the Doctor of Ministry degree from Inter-Baptist Theological Seminary. He became a deacon, and then was a pastor at Salem Missionary Baptist Church for over 25 years.

For 40 years, he was a DJ at a Shreveport radio station KOKA. He was a gospel announcer, program director and music director at the station.

Giles died on February 5, 2019, at the age of 80.

== Selected discography ==
=== Albums ===
- Southern Soul Brother (2014)

=== Singles ===
- "Losin' Boy" / "I Got The Blues" (1966)
- "While I'm Away" / "Eddy's Go-Go Train" (1967) (credited to Eddy "G" Giles* and The Jive 5)
- "Happy Man" / "Music" (1967) (credited to Eddy "G" Giles)
- "Soul Feeling Part 1" / "Soul Feeling Part 2" (1969) (credited to Eddy "G" Giles)
- "Love With A Feeling' / Baby, Be Mine" (1969) (credited to Eddy "G" Giles)
- "Losing Boy" / "It Takes Me All Night" (1971) (credited to Eddie Giles)
