= Memphis Sound =

Memphis Sound may refer to:

- Memphis soul, a style of soul music developed in Memphis, Tennessee, during the late 1960s and early 1970s
- The Memphis Sounds, an American basketball team from 1974 to 1975
