= The Ovations =

American singing group

- Origin: Memphis, Tennessee, U.S.
- Genres: R&B
- Years active: 1964–1969, 1971-1973
- Labels: Goldwax, Sounds of Memphis, MGM
- Past members: Louis Williams Jr. Nathan "Pedro" Lewis; Elvin Lee Jones; Billy Young; Rochester Neal; Bill Davis; Quincy Billops Jr.

The Ovations were an American rhythm and blues vocal group who recorded in the 1960s and 1970s. Their biggest hit, a remake of Sam Cooke's "Having a Party", reached no.7 on the Billboard R&B chart in 1973.

== Biography ==
The group was formed by Memphis, Tennessee, natives Louis Williams Jr. (24 February 1941 – 13 October 2002), Nathan "Pedro" Lewis (born 30 July 1943), and Elvin Lee Jones( 24 March 1942- 10 March 2012). Both lead singer Williams, who modeled his vocal style closely on that of his idol Sam Cooke, and Lewis, had previously sung with the Del-Rios, who recorded for Stax Records in 1962 when they were fronted by William Bell. In 1964, songwriter Roosevelt Jamison recommended the Ovations to Quinton Claunch and Doc Russell at Goldwax Records, and they were signed to record their first release, "Pretty Little Angel". It was not a hit, but their second record, "It's Wonderful To Be In Love", written by the group members, rose to no.22 on the Billboard R&B chart and no.61 on the pop chart.

The Ovations toured widely with James Brown, James Carr, Gladys Knight & the Pips, Percy Sledge and others, before releasing their follow-up single, "I'm Living Good," written by Dan Penn and Spooner Oldham and recorded in Muscle Shoals. However, it was not a commercial success. Jones left the group in 1966 and was replaced by Billy Young, a member of the Avantis. Several later records by the Ovations on Goldwax failed to chart, including "I Need A Lot Of Loving," also written by Penn and Oldham, and "I Believe I'll Go Back Home," co-written by George Jackson, before the group had their second hit with "Me And My Imagination," written by Claunch with Bill Cantrell, which reached no.40 on the R&B chart.

The group continued to record for Goldwax, until a dispute over royalties was followed by the collapse of the label in 1969. The Ovations then split up. In 1971 Williams formed a new version of the group, with singers Rochester Neal, Bill Davis, and Quincy Billops Jr., formerly of The Nightingales. They then recorded for the Sounds of Memphis label, an offshoot of MGM Records, and had a no.19 hit in 1972 with "Touching Me", produced by Dan Greer. In late 1973, the group had their biggest hit with "Having a Party", a version of the Sam Cooke song which was infused with a medley of other soul hits. The single, which had been recorded by Williams together with backing vocalists, reached no.7 on the R&B chart and no.56 on the pop chart. The group also released an album, Having a Party, on MGM, but disbanded soon afterwards. In 2009 their recording of "They Say" was included on a Goldwax Northern soul compilation.

== Discography ==
=== Chart singles ===
Year	Single	Chart Positions	
Year	Single	US Pop	US R&B
1965	"It's Wonderful to Be in Love"	61	22
1967	"Me and My Imagination"	-	40
1972	"Touching Me"	104	19
1973	"Having a Party"	56	7
