= Shaolin Soul =

Compilation album by Various artists
- Released: December 4, 2001/September 21, 2018
- Genre: Soul
- Length: 63:59
- Label: Koch

Shaolin Soul is a four-volume compilation of music sampled by the Wu-Tang Clan, and their various solo albums. The samples are principally for the tracks produced by RZA, and as such, largely cover the earlier years of their career.

== Reissues and follow-ups ==
In 2005, the first volume was reissued by Koch Records with a slightly changed track list.

In 2014, a three volume series of albums was also released under the title The RZA Presents Shaolin Soul Selection - Volumes 1, 2 and 3.

== Track listing ==
=== Volume 1 ===
#	Title	Time	Performer(s)
1	"Troubles, Heartaches & Sadness"	2:35	Ann Peebles
2	"Let's Straighten It Out"	3:47	O. V. Wright
3	"As Long As I've Got You"	2:38	The Charmels
4	"The Masquerade Is Over"	4:42	David Porter
5	"Groovin'"	2:57	Willie Mitchell
6	"You Ought to Be with Me"	3:14	Al Green
7	"You're All I Need To Get By"	2:47	Marvin Gaye & Tammi Terrell
8	"If You Think It (You May As Well Do It)"	3:01	The Emotions
9	"Nautilus"	5:00	Bob James
10	"Gotta Find A New World"	2:22	Al Green
11	"Little Ghetto Boy (Live)"	4:25	Donny Hathaway
12	"Could I Be Falling In Love"	3:06	Syl Johnson
13	"After Laughter (Comes Tears)"	2:59	Wendy Rene
14	"Ain't No Sunshine"	2:47	Lyn Collins
15	"In The Rain"	5:07	The Dramatics
16	"The Way We Were"	4:34	Gladys Knight & the Pips
17	"Sometimes I Feel Like a Motherless Child"	2:31	O.V. Wright
18	"Children Don't Get Weary"	3:33	Booker T. & the M.G.'s with Judy Clay
19	"Mellow Mood (Part 1)"	1:53	Barry White

=== Volume 2 ===
#	Title	Performer(s)	Sampled in
1	"I Hear The Love Chimes"	Syl Johnson	"Do You Hear the Bells?" by RZA
2	"I'm Gonna Tear Your Playhouse Down"	Ann Peebles	"The Plan" by Sunz of Man
3	"Hard Times"	Baby Huey	"Buck 50" by Ghostface Killah
4	"I Like It"	The Emotions	"Shimmy Shimmy Ya" by Ol Dirty Bastard
5	"I Keep Asking You Questions"	Black Ivory	"Criminology" by Raekwon; "Criminology 2.5" by Method Man, Ghostface Killah and Raekwon
6	"Honey Bee"	New Birth	"Clan in da Front" by Wu Tang Clan
7	"Maybe Tomorrow"	Jackson 5	"All That I Got Is You" by Ghostface Killah
8	"I Hate I Walked Away"	Syl Johnson	"We Made It" by Ghostface Killah
9	"Something"	Al Green	"Wu-Kin Blood" by La the Darkman
10	"Its Over"	Eddie Holman	"Nutmeg" by Ghostface Killah
11	"Warp Factor II (Edit)"	Montana	"Retro Godfather" by Method Man
12	"You're Getting Too Smart"	Detroit Emeralds	"Incarcerated Scarfaces" by Raekwon
13	"I Got The (Blues)"	Labi Siffre	No hook by Shaquille O'Neal feat. Method Man and RZA (1994)
14	"Ive Been Watching You"	Southside Movement	
15	"Why Marry"	The Sweet Inspirations	"Criminology" by Raekwon; "Criminology 2.5" by Method Man, Ghostface Killah and Raekwon
16	"Gone The Promises Of Yesterday"	Mad Lads	"'97 Mentality" by Cappadonna
17	"Aretha Sing One For Me"	George Jackson	"Child's Play" by Ghostface Killah
18	"Come Go with Me"	Teddy Pendergrass	
19	"That's Just My Luck"	Syl Johnson	
20	"Simply Beautiful"	Al Green	
