= Wee Willie Walker =

American soul and blues singer (1941–2019)

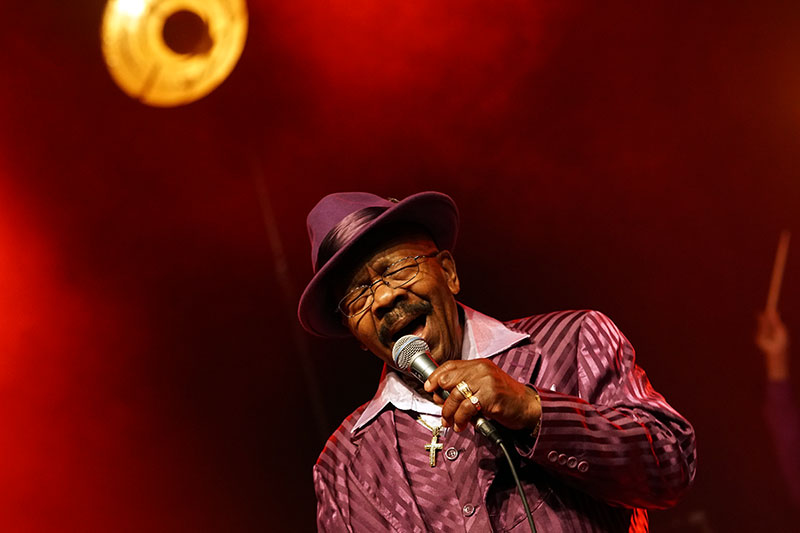
- Blues Heaven Festival 2018; Photo Hreinn Gudlaugsson

Background information
- Also known as: Willie Walker
- Born: Willie Earl Walker; December 21, 1941; Hernando, Mississippi, U.S.
- Died: November 19, 2019 (aged 77) St. Paul, Minnesota, U.S.
- Genres: R&B, soul
- Occupation: Singer
- Years active: 1950s–2019
- Labels: Goldwax, Checker, Haute, Little Village
- Website: www.weewilliewalker.com

Willie Earl Walker (December 23, 1941 – November 19, 2019), also known as Wee Willie Walker, was an American soul and blues singer.

== Life and career ==
He was born in Hernando, Mississippi, and grew up in Memphis, Tennessee, where he started singing with local gospel groups. From his mid-teens, he toured with the Redemption Harmonizers, who included Roosevelt Jamison. In 1960, while touring, Walker and a bandmate decided to stay in Minneapolis with a member of another gospel group, the Royal Jubileers, rather than returning to Memphis. In Minneapolis, he joined a local R&B vocal group, the Val-Dons (later Valdons), who became successful in and around Minneapolis–Saint Paul.

He was credited as "Wee" Willie Walker in recognition of his height, variously reported as 5 feet 2 inches (1.57 m) or 5 feet 5 inches (1.65 m). In the early 1960s, he led his own group, Wee Willie Walker and the Exciters. Walker returned occasionally to Memphis, and made his first recordings there in 1965 for Goldwax Records, produced by Quinton Claunch. His first release, in 1967, was a cover of the Beatles' "Ticket to Ride", with the B-side "There Goes My Used To Be", written by Roosevelt Jamison. He made more recordings for Goldwax in 1968, including "You Name It, I Have It" and "A Lucky Loser", which were both licensed for release by Checker Records. His recordings were not commercially successful. Due to a misunderstanding he missed the opportunity to be promoted by influential radio DJ John Richbourg, and Goldwax refused to release him from his contract to allow him to work with Curtis Mayfield.

Walker continued to work as a machinist, and later as a health care worker. He performed at weekends, singing with a voice described as "a mélange of Sam Cooke, Al Green and Otis Redding." He joined with Willie Murphy, another ex-member of the Valdons, and formed Willie & The Bees. In the 1970s he formed Salt, Pepper and Spice, a horn-based rock band.

In about 2002 he retired from his health care job and linked with local R&B band, the Butanes. They recorded three albums together, Right Where I Belong (2004); Memphisapolis (2006); and Long Time Thing (2011). They also toured together in Europe and Japan. Later, Walker led another R&B band, Willie Walker and We "R", who had a regular residency at the Minnesota Music Café in St. Paul. He also made an album with local musician and songwriter Paul Metsa, Live On Highway 55 (2013).

In 2014, harmonica player and bandleader Rick Estrin saw Walker performing, and invited Walker to sing with him on tour. Estrin produced Walker's 2015 album If Nothing Ever Changes, which in turn led to Walker's 2017 album, After a While, recorded with guitarist Anthony Paule's Soul Orchestra. The album was nominated for 'Album of the Year', 'Song of the Year' ("Hate Take a Holiday") and 'Soul Blues Album', with Walker nominated as 'Soul Blues Male Artist' category at the 39th Blues Music Awards in 2018. Walker was also named most outstanding male blues singer at the annual Living Blues Awards in 2018. In his latter years, Walker toured internationally, in Europe and South America.

Walker died at his home in Saint Paul, Minnesota, in November 2019, aged 77, shortly after returning from a recording session.
