= O. B. McClinton =

American singer-songwriter

- Born: Obie Burnett McClinton; April 25, 1940
- Origin: Senatobia, Mississippi, U.S.
- Died: September 23, 1987 (aged 47)
- Genres: Country
- Occupation: Singer-songwriter
- Instruments: Vocals, guitar
- Years active: 1972–1987
- Labels: Enterprise; Mercury; Epic; Sunbird; Moon Shine; Brylen

Obie Burnett "O. B." McClinton (April 25, 1940 – September 23, 1987) was an American black country music singer and songwriter. The second-youngest child born to Rev. G. A. McClinton, a clergyman and farmer who owned a 700-acre (2.8 km^{2}) ranch near Memphis, Tennessee. Listening to Hank Williams as a child around the age of nine or 10 sparked his interest in performing country music.

Before beginning his country music career, he tried to break into R&B. Although he was unable to secure a recording contract as a soul singer himself, he did pen several songs recorded by James Carr, including the title songs to Carr's albums You Got My Mind Messed Up and A Man Needs a Woman.

Known to refer to himself as the "Chocolate Cowboy", McClinton successfully marketed his album called The Only One on television long before the practice was commonplace. Featuring his first country chart single "Don't Let The Green Grass Fool You", a top 40 song in 1972, he considered it to be his finest work.

He died on September 23, 1987, after a year-long battle with abdominal cancer.

== Discography ==
=== Albums ===
Year	Album	US Country	Label
1971	O.B. McClinton Country	—	Enterprise
1973	Obie From Senatobie	—	Enterprise
1973	Live at Randy's Rodeo	—	Enterprise
1974	If You Loved Her That Way	—	Enterprise
1981	The Chocolate Cowboy	—	Lakeshore Music
1986	O.B. McClinton	—	Hometown
1987	The Only One	55	Epic
1988	Just For You	—	CBS/Hometown

=== Singles ===
Year	Single	Chart Positions				Album	Label
Year	Single	US Country	CAN Country	US Cashbox Country Singles	US Record World Country Singles	Album	Label
1964	"Tradin' Stamps"†	—	—	—	—	singles only	Beale Street
1965	"The Day The World Cried"†	—	—	—	—	singles only	Goldwax
1965	"She's Better Than You"±	—	—	—	—	singles only	Goldwax
1966	"Trying To Make It"†	—	—	—	—	singles only	Goldwax
1971	"Country Music, That's My Thing"	—	—	—	—	O.B. McClinton Country	Enterprise
1971	"Bad Guys Don't Always Wear Black Hats"	—	—	—	—	O.B. McClinton Country	Enterprise
1972	"Deep In The Heart Of Me"	—	—	—	—	O.B. McClinton Country	Enterprise
1972	"Six Pack of Trouble"	70	—	—	57	Obie From Senatobie	Enterprise
1972	"Don't Let the Green Grass Fool You"	37	72	31	38	Obie From Senatobie	Enterprise
1973	"My Whole World Is Falling Down"	36	—	39	35	Obie From Senatobie	Enterprise
1973	"I Wish It Would Rain"	67	—	59	57	Obie From Senatobie	Enterprise
1973	"You Don't Miss Your Water"	—	—	—	—	single only	Enterprise
1973	"The Unluckiest Songwriter In Nashville"	—	—	85	—	Obie From Senatobie	Enterprise
1974	"Something Better"	62	—	71	65	If You Loved Her That Way	Enterprise
1974	"If You Loved Her That Way"	86	—	87	—	If You Loved Her That Way	Enterprise
1974	"Blind, Crippled and Crazy"	—	—	—	—	singles only	Enterprise
1974	"Yours and Mine"	77	—	84	72	singles only	Enterprise
1975	"The Most Wanted Woman (Is An Unloved Wife)"	—	—	—	—	singles only	Enterprise
1975	"Just In Case"	—	—	—	—	singles only	Mercury
1976	"It's So Good Lovin' You"	100	—	71	—	singles only	Mercury
1976	"Black Speck"	—	—	103	—	singles only	Mercury
1976	"Let's Just Celebrate The Temporary"	—	—	—	—	singles only	Mercury
1977	"Country Roots"	—	—	—	—	singles only	ABC/Dot
1977	"Talk To My Children's Mama"	—	—	—	—	singles only	ABC/Dot
1978	"Hello, This Is Anna" (w/ Peggy Jo Adams)	90	—	84	89	singles only	Epic
1978	"Natural Love"	82	—	73	76	singles only	Epic
1979	"The Real Thing"	79	—	66	72	singles only	Epic
1979	"Soap"	58	—	46	53	singles only	Epic
1980	"Not Exactly Free"‡	62	—	77	75	The Chocolate Cowboy	Sunbird
1984	"Honky Tonk Tan"	69	—	—	—	Just For You	Moonshine
1984	"Last Rights"	—	—	—	—	singles only	Moonshine
1986	"Everybody's Talking About Ol' Herb ("The Whopper Song")"	—	—	—	—	singles only	Track
1987	"Turn the Music On"	61	—	—	—	The Only One	Epic
1987	"Still A Wanted Man"	—	—	—	—	The Only One	Epic

† "Oboe"
± "Oboe with The Keys"
‡ "O.B. McClinton (The Chocolate Cowboy)"
