= Anthony Paule =

American musician (born 1956)

- Born: December 21, 1956 (age 69); Durban, South Africa
- Genres: Electric blues, soul blues, R&B, rock, jazz
- Occupations: Guitarist, singer, songwriter
- Instruments: Guitar, vocals
- Years active: Late 1970s–present
- Label: Blue Dot Records
- Website: anthonypaule.com/index.html

Anthony Paule (born December 21, 1956) is an American electric blues guitarist, singer and songwriter. He has issued records in his own name, but is best known for his work with others including Boz Scaggs, Charlie Musselwhite, Jackie Payne, Mark Hummel, Home Cookin', Frank Bey, Van Morrison and Wee Willie Walker.

== Biography ==
Anthony Paule was born in Durban, South Africa. His family relocated to Los Angeles, California, United States, when Paule was 10 months old and, by the age of 15, he resettled in the Bay Area where, apart from a short while spent living in Wisconsin, it has remained his home. Paule was self-taught in playing the clarinet in his early teens, but was gifted a guitar from one of his elder brothers when aged 13, and it remained the musical instrument of choice. Paule commented, "The only time I pick up a clarinet now is to take the barrel off it, which makes a perfect guitar slide." In 1968, Paule was presented with a double album of Elmore James from his father, and after listening to it, Paule became a blues and soul music devotee.

In his formative years, Paule performed cover versions of current hits in a number of bands, plus between 1979 and 1985 he was part of a Wisconsin based soul band, Tina and the Tigers, where he sang with someone who later became his wife and songwriting partner, Cristine Vitale. After his relocation back to California, Paule was the lead guitarist for the Johnny Nocturne Band, which covered a time span of 12 years. In 1994, Paule was a member of Home Cookin', who released their eponymous album that year. Paule released his debut album, Big Guitar (1995), followed with Hiding in Plain Sight (2001). He then had a short spell playing in a blues trio, the Hound Kings, who released an album, Unleashed, in 2013. Almost simultaneously, Paule joined with Frank Bey in creating, You Don't Know Nothing, a live recording made at Biscuits & Blues in San Francisco, with Bey backed by Paule's seven strong ensemble. It peaked at No. 11 on Living Blues magazine's radio chart. A studio recording then ensued, Soul for Your Blues, issued by Blue Dot Records and produced by Paule, which had been recorded in December 2012 at Kid Andersen's studio in San Jose, California.

In 2014, Paule expanded his horizons and his band played at the Porretta Soul Festival, held in a tiny town of Porretta Terme, Italy. They proved a popular attraction, returning the following year backing Wee Willie Walker. In 2015, the Anthony Paule Band again backed Frank Bey on the recording, Not Going Away, an album that was largely reliant on new material. By the following year, the Anthony Paule Soul Band had become the Anthony Paule Soul Orchestra, an eight piece 'little, big band' incorporating a four-piece horn section with keyboard duties being carried out by Paule's longtime friend and musical sidekick, Tony Lufrano. At that time the membership of the Orchestra comprised Anthony Paule, guitar; D'Mar, drums; Tony Lufrano, keyboards; Endre Tarczy, Bass; Bill Ortiz, trumpet; Charles McNeal, tenor sax; Rob Sudduth baritone sax; Derek James, trombone, and on background vocals, Larry Batiste, Omega Rae and Sandy Griffith. After they played together at the Porretta Soul Festival, Wee Willie Walker and The Anthony Paule Soul Orchestra decided to record an album. In 2017, the collaboration issued, After a While.

Wee Willie Walker and the Anthony Paule Soul Orchestra released Not in my Lifetime, produced by Jim Gaines at the 25th Street Recording in Oakland, California. The collection contained ten original numbers and three cover versions. Walker died in his sleep in November 2019, three days after finishing recording his part for Not in my Lifetime. In addition to Walker's vocals, the rest of the recording was undertaken by Paule on guitar and electric sitar, Tony Lufrano on Hammond organ, piano and Wurlitzer, Endre Tarczy on bass, Kevin Hayes on drums, Derek James on trombone, Bill Ortiz on trumpet, Charles McNeal and Rob Sudduth on saxophone, and Batiste, Sandy Griffith and Omega Rae on backing vocals. Guests include Jon Otis on percussion, Curt Ingram on French horn, and the Sons of Soul Revivers (James Morgan, Dwayne Morgan and Walter Morgan) on backing vocals.

In 2022, the Anthony Paule Soul Orchestra was nominated for a Blues Music Award in the 'Band of the Year' category. In addition, the ensemble received four further nominations in 2022: 'Album of the Year' – Not in my Lifetime; 'Soul Blues Album of the Year' – Not in my Lifetime; 'Band of the Year' – The Anthony Paule Soul Orchestra; 'Song of the Year' – "Real Good Lie"; 'Soul Blues Female Artist of the Year' – Terrie Odabi. Singer Terrie Odabi had previously joined the band in Orvieto, Italy.

Over the years, Paule has worked with Boz Scaggs, Charlie Musselwhite, Johnny Adams, and Maria Muldaur, plus Mark Hummel, Van Morrison and Jackie Payne.

== Discography ==
Year of release	Album title	Record label	Accreditation
1995	Big Guitar	Blue Dot Records	Anthony Paule
2001	Hiding in Plain Sight	Blue Dot Records	Anthony Paule
2013	You Don't Know Nothing (live album)	Blue Dot Records	Frank Bey with the Anthony Paule Band
2013	Soul for Your Blues	Blue Dot Records	Frank Bey and the Anthony Paule Band
2015	Not Going Away	Blue Dot Records	Frank Bey and the Anthony Paule Band
2017	After a While	Blue Dot Records	Wee Willie Walker and the Anthony Paule Soul Orchestra
2021	Not in My Lifetime	Blue Dot Records	Wee Willie Walker and the Anthony Paule Soul Orchestra
2024	What Are You Waiting For?	Blue Dot Records	The Anthony Paule Soul Orchestra featuring Willy Jordan
2026	Somebody Tried to Sell Me a Bridge	Orangefield Records	Van Morrison
2026	What Can We Do?	Nola Blue Records	The Anthony Paule Soul Orchestra featuring Willy Jordan

== See also ==
- List of electric blues musicians
