= Home Cookin' =

Home Cookin may refer to:

- Home Cookin' (band), a horn-based soul band that played in the Las Vegas local scene from 1989 to 2000
- Home Cookin' (album), an album by American jazz organist Jimmy Smith
- Home Cookin' (Junior Walker album), 1969 album by Junior Walker
