= That's How Strong My Love Is =

Single by O. V. Wright
- B-side: "There Goes My Used To Be"
- Released: 1964
- Recorded: 1964, Memphis, Tennessee, United States
- Genre: Soul
- Length: 2:48
- Label: Goldwax
- Songwriter: Roosevelt Jamison

O. V. Wright singles chronology
"That's How Strong My Love Is" (1964)	"You're Gonna Make Me Cry" (1965)

"That's How Strong My Love Is" is a song written by Roosevelt Jamison and first recorded in 1964 by deep soul singer O. V. Wright.

The song is a soulful love ballad and has been covered many times, most notably in 1965 by Otis Redding, with Redding's cover reaching no.18 on the Billboard R&B chart and no.74 on the US pop chart. Redding's version is regarded as one of his signature songs. The lyrics use natural phenomena such as the sun, the moon, and the ocean to describe the extent of the author's love.

== Cover versions ==
Otis Redding's version appeared on his album The Great Otis Redding Sings Soul Ballads. Three other versions of the song were recorded in 1965, one by The Rolling Stones on their album Out of Our Heads, a second by The In Crowd, released as a single and the third by The Hollies on their 1966 album Would You Believe?. Millie Small recorded it on a single for Island Records, also in 1966.

=== Other versions ===
- The Rolling Stones recorded it for their 1965 album Out of Our Heads and also for their live album Live Licks, released in 2004
- The Hollies recorded it for their 1966 album Would You Believe?
- Percy Sledge released his version on his 1966 Atlantic album Warm and Tender Soul
- Ken Parker released a 1967 single produced by Clement "Coxsone" Dodd
- The Sweet Inspirations also covered the song as their third single release on Atlantic in 1968
- Steve Young on his 1969 album Rock Salt & Nails
- Candi Staton on her 1970 album I'm Just a Prisoner
- The Youngbloods on their 1971 album Good and Dusty
- Humble Pie on their 1973 album Eat It
- Little Milton on his 1973 album Waiting for Little Milton
- Bryan Ferry on his 1978 solo album The Bride Stripped Bare
- Taj Mahal on his 1993 album Dancing the Blues
- Roland Gift of the Fine Young Cannibals covered the song for the soundtrack to the 1996 movie Beautiful Girls
- Buddy Miller recorded the song on "Poison Love" in 1997
- ? and the Mysterians recorded a version on their 1999 album More Action.
- Doyle Bramhall covered this song on his 2003 album Fitchburg Street
- The Doughboys on their 2008 album Is It Now
- Seven Mary Three on their 2010 live and acoustic album Backbooth
- In 2011, Battlefield Band included a cover of the song on their album, Line Up, sung in the style of a folk-ballad
- In 2011, Jon Stevens included a cover on his album, Testify!
- Chris Robinson Brotherhood on the b-side of their 2012 single Older Guys
- Mick Hucknall on his 2012 album American Soul
- Billie Ray Martin on her 2016 album The Soul Tapes
- Howard "Guitar" Luedke recorded the song on his album Goin' Down to Alabama recorded at Muscle Shoals Sound Studio
