= Mr. Pitiful =

Single by Otis Redding

from the album Sings Soul Ballads
- B-side: "That's How Strong My Love Is"
- Released: 1964
- Recorded: December 1964; Stax Recording Studios (Memphis, Tennessee)
- Genre: Soul
- Length: 2:26
- Label: Volt/Atco; 8444
- Songwriters: Steve Cropper, Otis Redding
- Producer: Jim Stewart

Otis Redding singles chronology
"Security" (1964)	"Mr. Pitiful" (1964)	"I've Been Loving You Too Long" (1965)

"Mr. Pitiful" is a song written by Otis Redding and Steve Cropper and included on the 1965 album The Great Otis Redding Sings Soul Ballads.

== History ==
"Mr. Pitiful" was recorded in December 1964 at the Stax Records studios. The song was written by guitarist Steve Cropper and singer Otis Redding, his first collaboration with Cropper, as a response to a statement made by radio disc jockey Moohah Williams, when he nicknamed Redding as "Mr. Pitiful", because of sounding pitiful when singing ballads. Cropper heard this and had the idea to write a song with that name when taking a shower. Cropper then asked Redding in a car how he felt about this idea, and soon after they recorded the song in about 10 minutes. It was finally cut two or three times and then released with the B-side "That's How Strong My Love Is" as a single.

== Chart performance ==
The song became a hit and the most successful from the album The Great Otis Redding Sings Soul Ballads, peaking at No. 10 on the Billboard R&B and at No. 41 on the Billboard Hot 100 chart.

== Cover versions ==
- It was covered in 1969 by Etta James as "Miss Pitiful".
- Robert Plant of Led Zeppelin makes a nod to Otis Redding in the song "The Crunge" (from the 1973 album Houses of the Holy), which is known for paying tribute to soul and funk.
- It appeared on The Commitments (1991) soundtrack (sung by Andrew Strong). This version of the song also appears in season 2, episode 12 of the sitcom Frasier, "Roz in the Doghouse".
- The song was covered by Taj Mahal on his 1997 album Seňor Blues.
- The Rolling Stones covered it live five times between August and December 2005 on their A Bigger Bang Tour.
- Tower of Power covered it with vocals by Sam Moore on their 2009 album Great American Soulbook.
