= Mmm, Mmm, Mmm =

Mmm, Mmm, Mmm,

Studio album by Home Cookin'
- Released: 1997
- Genre: Funk; soul; rhythm and blues; rock
- Label: Fly

Home Cookin' chronology
Mmm, Mmm, Mmm, (1997)	Pink in the Middle (2000)

Mmm, Mmm, Mmm is the 1997 debut of the Las Vegas soul music band Home Cookin', featuring fourteen tracks. Track nine, Soul Space Express, appeared on Road Rash: Jailbreak and the television series Cupid, while X-Rated Superstar was a number one hit. The success of this song warranted the release of a racy music video. The band's second and final album, Pink in the Middle, was released three years later.

== Track listing ==
All tracks written and performed by Home Cookin'.

1. X-Rated Superstar
2. Hold Tight
3. Against the Grain
4. All Talk
5. Somebody
6. Needle's Sing
7. Golden Rule
8. Had a Feelin'
9. Soul Space Express
10. Words
11. Rock It Man
12. Cricket
13. Shine It On
14. Second Guess

Soul Space Express by Home Cookin'
A 35 second sample of Soul Space Express, demonstrating the band's soul / rock fusion

== Personnel ==
- Dave Baker - Electric guitar
- Steve Barclay - Bass guitar
- Russell Burt - Tenor saxophone
- Jason Colby - Trumpet
- Steve Dawson - Baritone saxophone
- Hal Floyd - Bass guitar
- Frank Klepacki - drums
- Fito Ruiz - Bones
- Rob Mader - Alto saxophone
- Joe Malone - percussion
- Dave Philippus - Bones
- Jordan Robins - vocals
- Rob Stone - Alto saxophone
- Daryl Williams - Bass guitar
- Anthony Jones- Bass guitar
