= Southside Movement =

American soul and funk musical group

The Southside Movement was an American soul and funk musical group from Chicago, Illinois. Composed of vocalist Melvin Moore, guitarist Bobby Pointer (June 19, 1945 – December 26, 2016), keyboardist Morris Beeks, bassist Ronald Simmons, drummer Willie Hayes, alto saxophonist Milton Johnson, trumpeter Stephen Hawkins (June 28, 1945 – September 23, 2021), and trombonist Bill McFarland, the group began as the backing band for the soul duo Simtec & Wylie. Southside Movement issued their self-titled debut album on the Wand record label in 1973; it included the Top 20 US Billboard R&B chart hit, "I've Been Watching You". Their second album, Movin’ appeared in 1974, which provided another breakbeat favorite in the track "Save the World".

In 1975, the group released their last album Moving South, and despite some success, the Southside Movement disbanded that year.

== Legacy ==
Southside Movement's tracks, "I've Been Watching You" and "Save the World", appeared later on the breakbeat compilation album, Ultimate Breaks and Beats. Their track "I've Been Watching You" appeared on the compilation, Shaolin Soul. Also, "I've Been Watching You" has been sampled for a variety of contemporary songs. These include "So What'cha Want" by Beastie Boys; "Show Discipline" by Jadakiss, "Smoke Dope and Rap" by Andre Nickatina; "At The Helm" by Hieroglyphics; "American Beauty" by Cormega; "24 Deep" by Brotha Lynch Hung; "Woo" by Erykah Badu; "E-Pro" by Beck, whilst "1$44" by Mr Oizo, used a distorted version of the instrumental. Kool G Rap also sampled The Southside Movement's "Love is For Fools" in "It's a Shame" from his 1995 album 4,5,6.

== Discography ==
- Southside Movement Wand (1973)
- Moving South 20th Century (1974)
- Movin' 20th Century (1974)
