= The Rolling Stones, Now! =

Studio album by the Rolling Stones
- Released: 13 February 1965
- Recorded: 3 January – 8 November 1964
- Genres: Rock and roll; R&B; blues rock
- Length: 35:58
- Label: London
- Producer: Andrew Loog Oldham

The Rolling Stones US chronology
12 × 5 (1964)	The Rolling Stones, Now! (1965)	Out of Our Heads (1965)

Singles from The Rolling Stones, Now!
- 1. "Heart of Stone" Released: December 1964

The Rolling Stones, Now! is the third American studio album by the English rock band the Rolling Stones, released on 13 February 1965 by their initial American distributor, London Records. Although it contains two previously unissued songs and an alternative version, the album mostly consists of songs released earlier in the United Kingdom, as well as the group's recent single in the United States, "Heart of Stone" backed with "What a Shame". Mick Jagger and Keith Richards wrote four of the songs on the album (including the US single), with the balance composed by American rhythm and blues and rock and roll artists.

== Marketing and sales ==
The album reached number five on the Billboard 200 album chart and was certified "gold" by the Recording Industry Association of America. The liner notes on initial pressings contained producer Andrew Loog Oldham's advice to the record buying public, which was quickly temporarily removed from some subsequent pressings:

This is THE STONES new disc within. Cast deep in your pockets for the loot to buy this disc of groovies and fancy words. If you don't have the bread, see that blind man knock him on the head, steal his wallet and low [sic] and behold you have the loot, if you put in the boot, good, another one sold!

This quote also appeared on some issues of the UK Rolling Stones No. 2 LP.

In August 2002, The Rolling Stones, Now! was reissued in a new remastered CD and SACD digipak by ABKCO Records. This version included stereo mixes of "Heart of Stone", "What a Shame", and "Down the Road Apiece". (N.B. Some mid-1990s CD releases of this album also have these stereo mixes, and - probably mistakenly - use the five minute version of the opening track which first appeared on the UK LP, despite having covers and track listings claiming it contains the 2:57 version.)

== Critical reception ==
Professional ratings
Review scores
Source	Rating
AllMusic	5/5 stars
Encyclopedia of Popular Music	4/5 stars
MusicHound Rock	4/5 stars
Music Story	4/5 stars
The Rolling Stone Album Guide	5/5 stars
Tom Hull	A−

In a retrospective review, music critic Richie Unterberger gave the album AllMusic's highest rating (5 out of 5 stars). He commented "Now! is almost uniformly strong start-to-finish, the emphasis on some of their blackest material. The covers of "Down Home Girl", Bo Diddley's vibrating "Mona", Otis Redding's "Pain in My Heart", and Barbara Lynn's "Oh Baby" are all among the group's best R&B interpretations."

The Rolling Stone Album Guide also gave the album 5 out of 5 stars, the highest rating for a pre-Aftermath album by the group. It noted "The Rolling Stones, Now! is their first consistently great LP, with the mean 'Heart of Stone,' the funky 'Off the Hook,' and the Leiber-Stoller oldie 'Down Home Girl'". The magazine also ranked it at number 180 on the list of the 500 Greatest Albums of All Time.

Now! was one of the first four rock albums purchased by future music critic Robert Christgau. For Paul Gambaccini's 1978 book Critic's Choice: Top 200 Albums, he included it in his top-10 albums submission at number nine. He also listed it in his "Basic Record Library" of 1950s and 1960s recordings, published in Christgau's Record Guide: Rock Albums of the Seventies (1981). In commentaries on the album, he has called it "classic", "passionate and urgent", and "easily the sharpest of the pre-Aftermath Stones LPs".

== Track listing ==
Side one
No.	Title	Writer(s)	Original release	Length
1.	"Everybody Needs Somebody to Love"	Solomon Burke, Bert Berns, Jerry Wexler	The Rolling Stones No. 2 (UK) has an alternative longer version in a different key	2:57
2.	"Down Home Girl"	Jerry Leiber, Artie Butler	The Rolling Stones No. 2	4:15
3.	"You Can't Catch Me"	Chuck Berry	The Rolling Stones No. 2	4:30
4.	"Heart of Stone"	Jagger/Richards	single (US)	2:49
5.	"What a Shame"	Jagger/Richards	B-side of "Heart of Stone" (US) & The Rolling Stones No. 2 (UK)	2:50
6.	"Mona (I Need You Baby)"	Ellas McDaniel a.k.a. Bo Diddley	The Rolling Stones (UK)	3:55
Total length:				21:16

Side two
No.	Title	Writer(s)	Original release	Length
1.	"Down the Road Apiece"	Don Raye	The Rolling Stones No. 2	3:00
2.	"Off the Hook"	Jagger/Richards	B-side of "Little Red Rooster" (UK) & The Rolling Stones No. 2 (UK)	2:35
3.	"Pain in My Heart"	Naomi Neville a.k.a. Allen Toussaint	The Rolling Stones No. 2	2:12
4.	"Oh Baby (We Got a Good Thing Goin')"	Barbara Lynn Ozen	Out of Our Heads	2:06
5.	"Little Red Rooster"	Willie Dixon	single (UK)	3:00
6.	"Surprise, Surprise"	Jagger/Richards	The Rolling Stones, Now!	2:20
Total length:				15:13

== Recording sessions ==
The songs were recorded between 10 June and 8 November 1964 at the Chess Records studio in Chicago, and RCA Records studio in Hollywood, California; except "Mona (I Need You Baby)", 3–4 January 1964, Regent Sound Studios, London.

== Personnel ==
The Rolling Stones

- Mick Jagger – lead vocals, harmonica, tambourine, percussion
- Keith Richards – electric guitar, backing vocals
- Brian Jones – electric and slide guitars, harmonica, backing vocals
- Charlie Watts – drums, percussion
- Bill Wyman – bass guitar, backing vocals

Additional personnel

- Jack Nitzsche – piano (2, 4), "Nitzsche phone" (sound effects on 9)
- Ian Stewart – piano (1, 5, 7)

== Charts ==
Chart (1965)	Peak position
Australian Albums (Kent Music Report)	2
US Billboard 200	5

== Certifications ==
Region	Certification	Certified units/sales
United States (RIAA)	Gold	500,000^{^}
^{^} Shipments figures based on certification alone.
