= Roosevelt Jamison =

American music manager (1936–2013)

- Born: July 15, 1936; Olive Branch, Mississippi United States
- Died: March 27, 2013 (aged 76) Memphis, Tennessee, U.S.
- Occupations: Songwriter, personal manager, impresario, publicist
- Years active: 1960s

Roosevelt Jamison (July 15, 1936 – March 27, 2013) was an American music manager, publicist and songwriter who worked in Memphis, Tennessee, during the 1960s. His most notable composition was "That's How Strong My Love Is", first recorded by O.V. Wright and released on Quinton Claunch's Goldwax record label in 1964.

== Biography ==
Jamison was born in Olive Branch, Mississippi. He was always interested in music and was an important figure on the Memphis scene, managing local groups and rehearsing them at the back of the Interstate Blood Bank he ran on Beale Street. It was through these groups that he discovered O.V. Wright and James Carr, who were both with the gospel group The Harmony Echoes.

Jamison began writing his own songs, resulting in the hugely successful "That's How Strong My Love Is", which was originally released by O.V. Wright. "That's How Strong My Love Is" was much covered, most notably by Otis Redding, appearing on his 1965 album The Great Otis Redding Sings Soul Ballads, and on Out of Our Heads by The Rolling Stones, also in 1965. In 1973 Humble Pie included it on their album Eat It. The song has also been covered on albums by Taj Mahal, Candi Staton, Percy Sledge and Buddy Miller, as well as by Roland Gift on the Beautiful Girls movie soundtrack and by Battlefield Band on their 2011 album, Line Up.

After a contract dispute between Wright and Don Robey, the duo parted company and Jamison focused all his attention on mentoring soul singer James Carr. From a young age, Carr was shy and withdrawn and he ended up suffering from manic depression. For most of the rest of Carr's life, Jamison served as his manager, mentor, publicist, composer and confidant. With Jamison pushing the naturally withdrawn Carr, the singer managed to score several hits for the Goldwax label, including "The Dark End of the Street". Jamison remained committed to Carr long after Goldwax folded in 1969. In 1977 Jamison mortgaged his home to finance a Carr comeback on Jamison's own Rivercity Records label, featuring "Let Me Be Right", which saw marginal success. Carr later left the R&B music business and returned to his gospel church roots instead.

Aside from his music interests, Jamison spent early years in sickle cell research under Dr. L.W. Diggs at the University of Tennessee. He taught Anatomy and Physiology at Draughn's Business College for several years. He also worked as an assistant supervisor of the hematology lab at City of Memphis Hospital (The Med), until his retirement.

Jamison died at his home in Memphis, Tennessee on March 27, 2013, at the age of 76.
