= Frank Bey =

American blues singer (1946–2020)

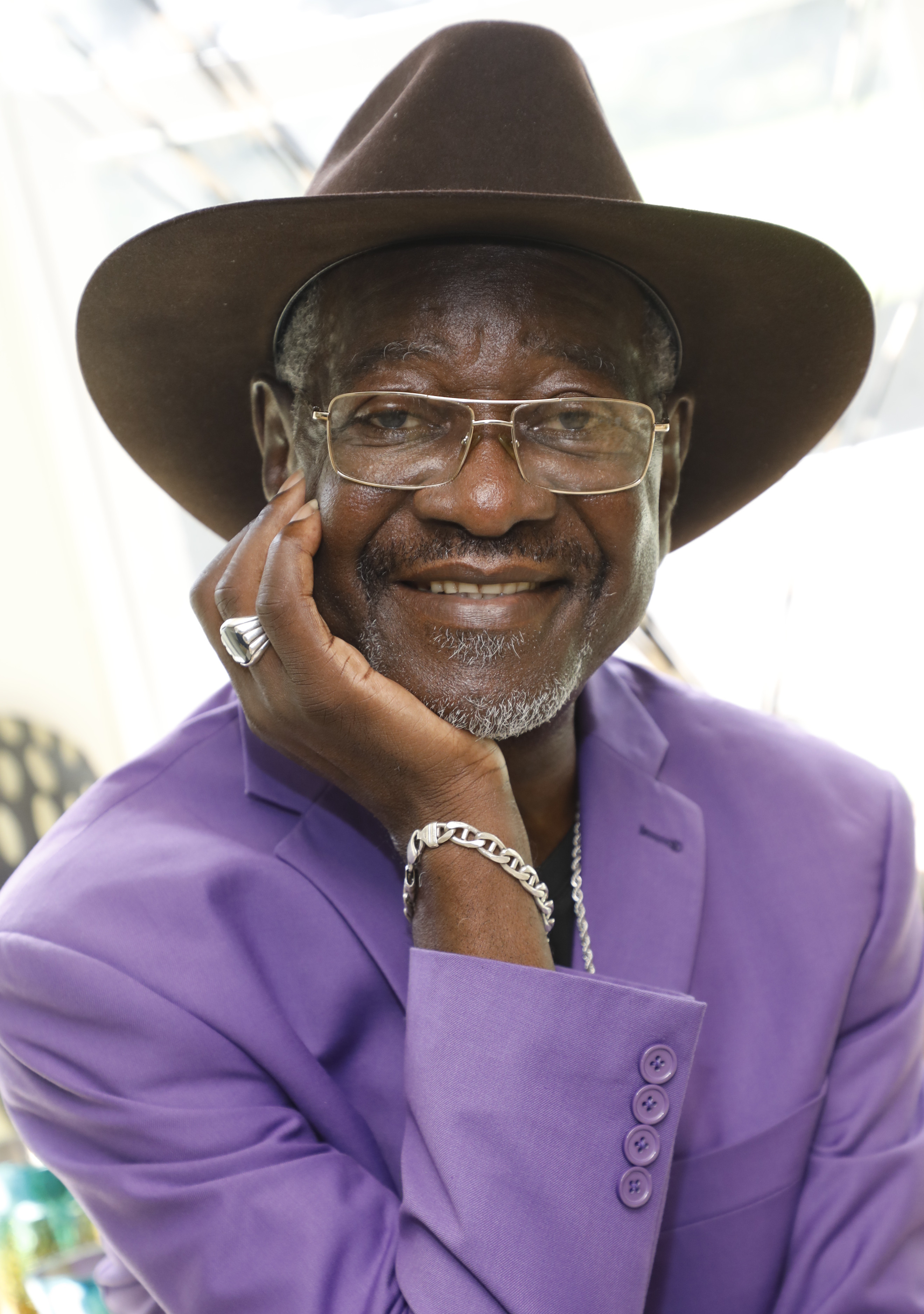

Background information
- Born: Frank Bass; January 17, 1946; Millen, Georgia, U.S.
- Died: June 7, 2020 (aged 74) Glenolden, Pennsylvania, U.S.
- Genre: Blues
- Occupation: Singer
- Label: Nola Blue
- Website: www.frankbey.com

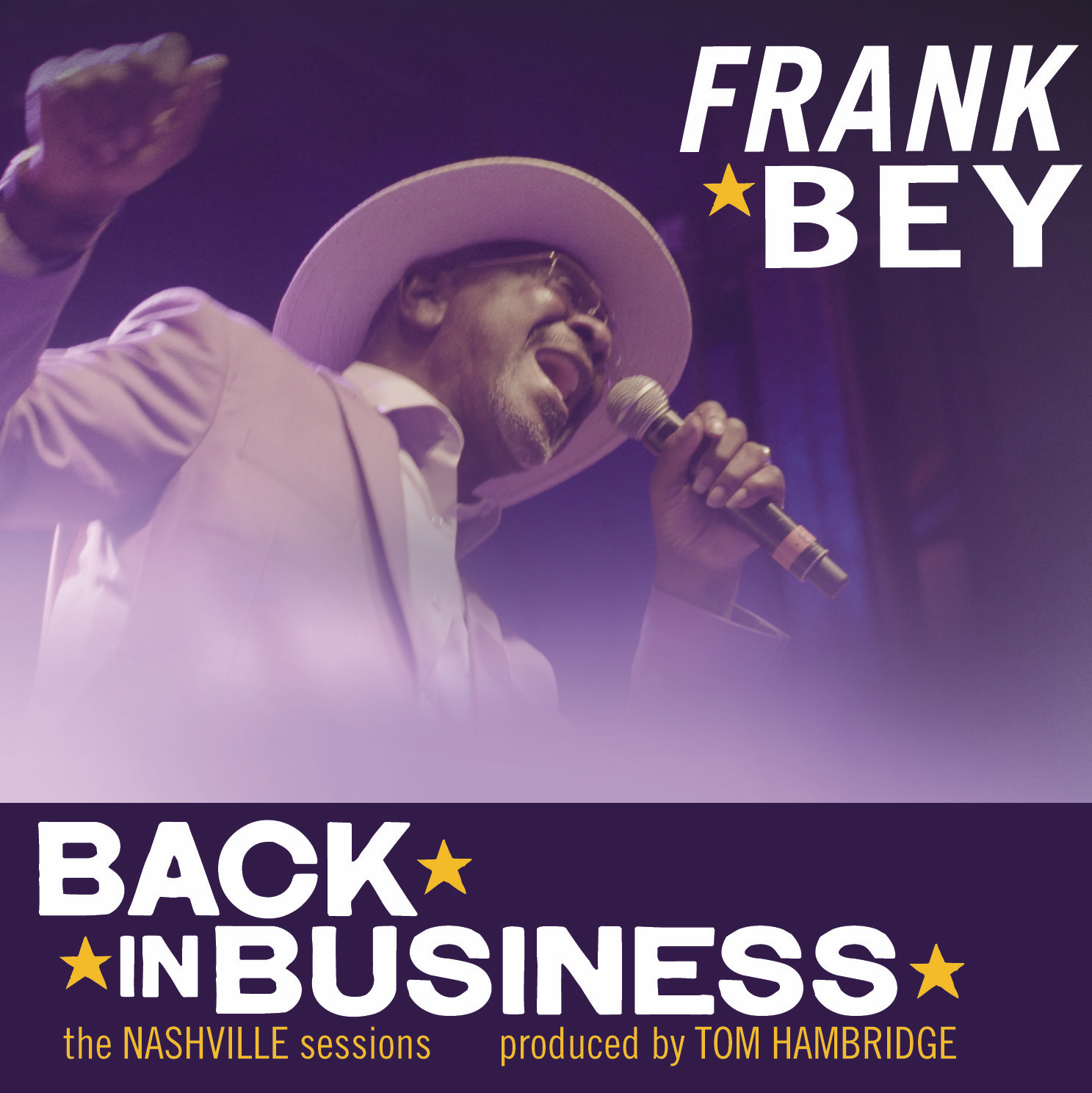
Back in Business album cover, released September 21, 2018

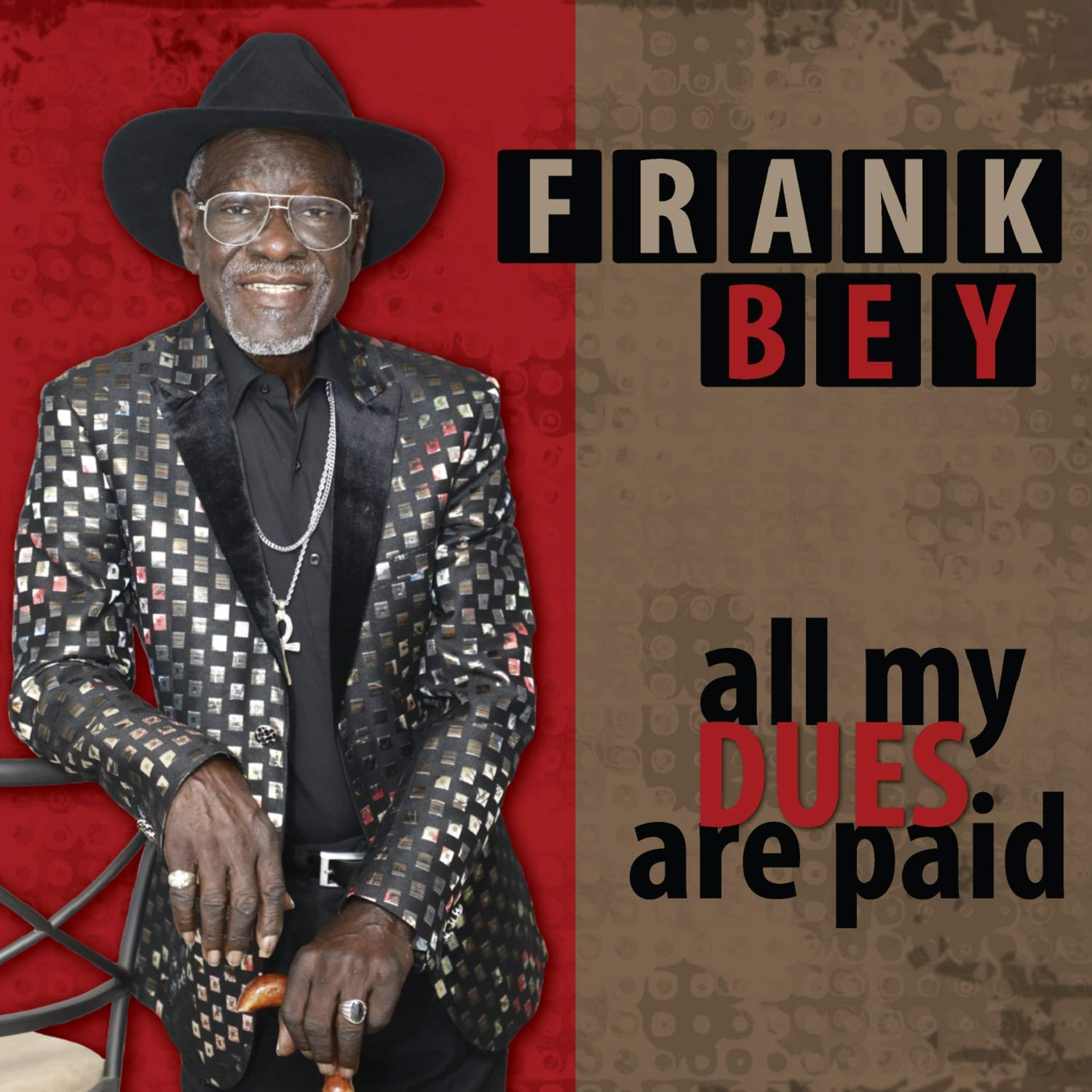
All My Dues Are Paid was recorded and produced by Chrisoffer "Kid" Andersen at Greaseland Studio and released January 17, 2020

Frank Bey (born Frank Bass; January 17, 1946 – June 7, 2020) was an American blues singer. He changed his last name from Bass to Bey at age 27 when he joined the Moorish Science Temple of America.

== Early life ==
Born and raised in Millen, Georgia, Frank was the seventh of twelve children born to gospel singer Maggie Jordan. He began his singing career performing gospel at the age of four. Along with his brother and two cousins, their group “The Rising Sons” toured around The South making live appearances as well as radio broadcasts. He remained with them until age 12 or 13 when the group dissolved. He also sang with his mother at local concerts, where he had the opportunity to help open shows for the Five Blind Boys of Alabama, the Soul Stirrers, and other notable groups.

== Career ==
He left home when he was 17 and moved to Philadelphia, where he worked for two and a half years as a driver for Gene Lawson, Otis Redding’s advance publicity man. Redding sometimes rode in the back seat on trips between engagements. On three of those occasions, when the opening act was late showing up, Bey says he was given the opportunity to open the shows. By the early 1970s he joined the Moorish Vanguard who began touring in the Southeast. In 1976, Bey produced The Sunset of Your Love on the Country Eastern Music label. James Brown then published the song on Polydor Records without the Vanguard's permission. The group initially accused Bey of giving the song to Brown but Brown later settled and admitted to taking the song. After this, Bey left the music business for 17 years, and had his own businesses in the construction and restaurant industries.

By 1996, Bey returned to singing in the Philadelphia area. In 1998, Bey's debut album, Steppin' Out, was released on MAG Records. Health problems interfered with his ability to perform in support of the release, and he subsequently released Blues in the Pocket in 2007 on Jeffhouse Records. By then, Bey was brought by blues DJ Noel Hayes to the Bay Area in California to perform with guitarist Anthony Paule and other area musicians. The two went on to release three albums, You Don't Know Nothing (Live), Soul for Your Blues, and Not Goin' Away between 2013 and 2015.

In July 2018, Bey signed with Nola Blue Records. In September, he released his first CD on the Nola Blue label, Back In Business. This was followed by the release of All My Dues Are Paid in January 2020, which was nominated for a Grammy Award for "Best Traditional Blues Album".

== Death ==
Bey died on June 7, 2020, after a long illness.

== Awards ==
- 35th Blues Music Awards – Nominee for Soul Blues Male Artist of the Year
- 35th Blues Music Awards – Nominee (with Anthony Paule) for Soul Blues Album of the Year (Soul for Your Blues)
- 37th Blues Music Awards – Nominee for Soul Blues Male Artist of the Year
- 37th Blues Music Awards – Nominee (with Anthony Paule) for Soul Blues Album of the Year (Not Goin' Away)
- 40th Blues Music Awards – Nominee for Soul Blues Male Artist of the Year
- 40th Blues Music Awards – Nominee for Soul Blues Album of the Year (Back In Business)
- 2018 Global Music Awards – Gold Medal, Male Vocalist – Back In Business
- 2019 Blues Blast Music Awards – Nominee for Soul Blues Album (Back In Business)
- 17th Independent Music Awards – Nominee for Blues Album (Back In Business)
- 18th Independent Music Awards – Nominee for Blues Album (All My Dues Are Paid)
- 63rd Annual Grammy Awards – Nominee for Best Traditional Blues Album (All My Dues are Paid)

== Discography ==
| Album | Artist | Release date | Credit | Reference |
|---|---|---|---|---|
| The Sunset of Your Love | Moorish Vanguard | 1976 | Producer, Vocals | |
| Steppin' Out | Frank Bey | 1998 | Primary Artist | |
| Blues in the Pocket | Frank Bey | 2007 | Primary Artist | |
| You Don't Know Nothing | Frank Bey/Anthony Paule | 2013 | Vocals | |
| Soul for Your Blues | Frank Bey/Anthony Paule | 2014 | Vocals | |
| Not Goin' Away | Frank Bey/Anthony Paule | 2015 | Vocals | |
| Back in Business | Frank Bey | 2018 | Primary Artist | |
| All My Dues Are Paid | Frank Bey | 2020 | Primary Artist | |
