= O. V. Wright =

American blues singer (1939–1980)

O.V. Wright

Background information
- Born: Overton Vertis Wright; October 9, 1939; Lenow, Shelby County, Tennessee, U.S.
- Died: November 16, 1980 (aged 41) Mobile, Alabama, U.S.
- Genres: R&B, soul, funk, deep soul, soul blues
- Occupations: Singer-songwriter, musician, producer, instrumentalist, sideman
- Instruments: Vocals, guitar, drums, piano/keyboards
- Years active: 1964–1980
- Labels: Back Beat Records, Hi
- Website: Official website

Overton Vertis Wright (October 9, 1939 – November 16, 1980) was an American singer who is generally regarded as a blues artist by African-American fans in the Deep South; he is also regarded as one of Southern soul's most authoritative and individual artists. His best known songs include "That's How Strong My Love Is" (1964), "You're Gonna Make Me Cry" (1965), "Nucleus of Soul" (1968), "A Nickel and a Nail" (1971), "I Can't Take It" (1971) and "Ace of Spades" (1971).

== Biography ==
Born in Lenow, Tennessee, Wright began singing in the church as a youngster. In 1956, while still in high school, he joined The Sunset Travelers as one of the lead singers of the gospel group. He later fronted a gospel music group, the Harmony Echoes. It was during this time that he was discovered (along with James Carr) by Roosevelt Jamison, a songwriter and manager. Their first pop recording in 1964 was "That's How Strong My Love Is," a ballad later covered by Otis Redding and the Rolling Stones. It was issued on Goldwax, the label Wright signed to after leaving his gospel career. It was later determined that Don Robey still had him under a recording contract, due to his gospel group having recorded for Peacock. After his contract was shifted to Don Robey's Back Beat label, further R&B hits followed. Working with record producer Willie Mitchell, success continued on songs including "Ace of Spades" and "A Nickel and a Nail".

Wright's hits were much more popular in the deep South. His biggest hits were "You're Gonna Make Me Cry" (R&B No. 6, 1965), "Eight Men, Four Women" (R&B No. 4, 1967) "Ace of Spades" (R&B No. 11, 1970), "A Nickel and a Nail" (R&B No. 19, 1971). The remainder of his 17 hits charted no higher than No. 20 on the R&B chart.

Wright was imprisoned for narcotics offenses during the mid-1970s, and, despite a new recording contract with Hi Records that led to a series of new album releases, commercial success did not follow his release from incarceration. Wright continued to battle drug addiction in the last years of his life, and in November 16, 1980, he died from a heart attack in Mobile, Alabama, at the age of 41, while performing at Joe’s Supper Club in Grand Bay, Alabama.

In 2008 the "OV Wright Memorial Fund" purchased and installed a headstone for his previously unmarked grave.

== Legacy ==
Wright is among the most remembered voices of soul music, perhaps mostly for being sampled frequently in hip hop music. In 1996, his song "Motherless Child" was sampled on the Ghostface Killah album Ironman and on the Sunset Park movie soundtrack on a song also called "Motherless Child". That and another Wright recording, "Let's Straighten It Out", have been published on Shaolin Soul, a compilation of tracks that have been sampled by the Wu-Tang Clan and its members. "Let's Straighten It Out" was sampled in a Wu-Tang Clan song called "America" from the charity compilation album America Is Dying Slowly. "Ace of Spades" was sampled by Slim Thug and the Boss Hogg Outlawz on a song named "Recognize A Playa".

Wright has been a big influence on many soul and blues singers, including Robert Cray, Otis Clay, Taj Mahal as well as young soul singer Reggie Sears, among many others.

Johnny Rawls joined Wright's backing band in the mid-1970s, and played together with Wright until the latter's death in 1980. The band then continued billed as the O.V. Wright Band for another 13 years, and toured and performed with other musicians over this time span. These included B. B. King, Little Milton, Bobby Bland, Little Johnny Taylor, and Blues Boy Willie.

He is a 2024 inductee to the Blues Foundation's Blues Hall of Fame.

== Discography ==
=== Albums ===
- 1965: (If It Is) Only for Tonight (Back Beat Records)
- 1967: 8 Men and 4 Women (Back Beat Records)
- 1968: Nucleus of Soul (Back Beat Records)
- 1972: A Nickel and a Nail -and- Ace of Spades (Back Beat Records)
- 1973: Memphis Unlimited (Back Beat Records)
- 1977: Into Something (Can't Shake Loose) (Hi Records)
- 1978: The Bottom Line (Hi Records)
- 1979: We're Still Together (Hi Records)
- 1980: O.V. Wright Live (Hi Records) recorded 1979

=== Chart singles ===
Year	Single	Chart Positions	
Year	Single	US Pop	US R&B
1965	"You're Gonna Make Me Cry"	86	6
1967	"Eight Men, Four Women"	80	4
1967	"Heartaches, Heartaches"	–	25
1967	"What About You"	–	46
1968	"Oh Baby Mine"	–	36
1969	"I'll Take Care of You"	–	43
1970	"Love the Way You Love"	–	48
1970	"Ace of Spades"	54	11
1971	"When You Took Your Love from Me"	–	21
1971	"A Nickel and a Nail"	–	19
1973	"I'd Rather Be (Blind, Crippled and Crazy)"	–	33
1974	"I've Been Searching"	–	62
1975	"What More Can I Do (To Prove My Love for You)"	–	82
1976	"Rhymes"	–	87
1977	"Into Something (Can't Shake Loose)"	–	43
1978	"Precious, Precious"	–	50
1978	"I Don't Do Windows"	–	91
