= Heart of Stone (Rolling Stones song) =

1964 single by The Rolling Stones

- European EP picture sleeve

Single by The Rolling Stones

from the album Out of Our Heads (UK) and The Rolling Stones, Now! (US)
- B-side: "What a Shame"
- Released: December 19, 1964 (US)
- Recorded: October 1964
- Studio: RCA, Hollywood, California
- Genre: Rock
- Length: 2:50
- Label: London
- Songwriter: Jagger/Richards
- Producer: Andrew Loog Oldham

The Rolling Stones US singles chronology
"Time Is on My Side" (1964)	"Heart of Stone" (1964)	"The Last Time" (1965)

"Heart of Stone" is a song by the English rock band The Rolling Stones, credited to the songwriting partnership of Jagger/Richards. London Records first issued it as a single in the United States in December 1964. The song was subsequently included on The Rolling Stones, Now! (February 1965, US) and Out of Our Heads (September 1965, UK).

== Composition ==
In an AllMusic review, Richie Unterberger writes, "'Heart of Stone' [is] a slow and soulful, dramatic ballad with the kind of vaguely discordant, droning guitars heard on many an early The Rolling Stones slow number. What was impressive was how the Jagger/Richards song, though similar in some respect to American soul ballads of the period ... was not explicitly derivative of any one blues or soul song that they were covering on their mid-60s records. The lilt of the verses owed something to country music and the mournful harmonies heard on the latter part of the verses added to the overall feeling of melancholy moodiness."

The song sees the singer discuss his life as a womanizer, and how one girl in particular won't break his heart:

There've been so many girls that I've known
I've made so many cry and still I wonder why
Here comes the little girl
I see her walking down the street
She's all by herself, I try and knock her off her feet
But she'll never break, never break, never break, never break,
This heart of stone

== Recording and release ==
"Heart of Stone" was recorded in October 1964 at the RCA Studios in Los Angeles with Jagger singing, Keith Richards and Brian Jones on guitars, Bill Wyman on bass, and Charlie Watts on drums. Jack Nitzsche performs tambourine and piano.

"Heart of Stone" was initially released in December 1964 as a single in the US where it became their second Top 20 US hit, reaching number 19. The song was included on the US album The Rolling Stones, Now! the following February. In 1966, it was included on the collection Big Hits (High Tide and Green Grass); it later appeared on compilation albums including Hot Rocks 1964-1971 (1971), 30 Greatest Hits (1977), Singles Collection: The London Years (1989), and GRRR! (2012).

A longer version appeared in 1975 on the album Metamorphosis. This had been recorded on 21–23 July 1964 with Jimmy Page on guitar and Clem Cattini on drums, probably as a demo.

=== Personnel ===
- Mick Jagger – lead vocals
- Keith Richards – lead guitar
- Brian Jones – baritone guitar, rhythm guitar
- Bill Wyman – bass guitar, backing vocals
- Charlie Watts – drums
- Jack Nitzsche – tambourine, piano

== Charts ==
Chart (1965)	Peak position
Canada Hit Parade (CHUM Chart)	1
Canada Top Singles (RPM)	15
Finland (Soumen Virallinen)	39
Netherlands (Single Top 100)	8
US Billboard Hot 100	19

== Cover versions ==
The British post-punk group the Mekons covered the song on their 1988 album So Good It Hurts, twisting the song's impact with female vocals provided by Sally Timms. The Allman Brothers Band covered the song on their 2003 album Hittin' the Note, their first release with slide guitar player Derek Trucks. The Outcasts from Texas covered the song in 1965. Sonic's Rendezvous Band has also played the song.
