= Reuben Bell =

American soul singer

Reuben Bell (c. 1945 – 2004) was an American soul singer who recorded from the late 1960s to the early 1980s, and is best known for his emotional tenor vocals on the songs "It's Not That Easy" and "I Hear You Knocking (It's Too Late)".

Born in Shreveport, Louisiana, he began singing in local clubs. His first single was "It's Not That Easy", recorded with backing group the Casanovas, and released on the local Murco Records label in 1967. The song was written by Bell, produced by Heads Up Productions and Dee Marais, and released with Bell's song "Hummin' A Sad Song". The song became one of Bell's best known songs, and emblematic of his high tenor voice. The recording has subsequently become regarded as a classic of Southern soul and has featured on several compilation albums. Dave Godin selected the song for his Dave Godin's Deep Soul Treasures : Taken from the Vaults Vol.1 compilation.

Two later records followed on Murco, "You're Gonna Miss Me" with The Beltones, and "Action Speaks Louder Than Words", before Bell moved to the Silver Fox and House of Orange labels where some of his recordings were produced by Wardell Quezergue. He also wrote songs recorded by Bobby "Blue" Bland and others.

In 1972, he recorded Tarheel Slim's song, "I Hear You Knocking (It's Too Late)", for the DeLuxe label, a subsidiary of King Records. It became Bell's only chart hit, reaching number 38 on the Billboard R&B chart. He continued to record through the 1970s for the Alarm label, and released his only album, Blues Get Off My Shoulder, for the Port City label in 1982.

Bell died in 2004 while living in Shreveport's Cedar Grove neighborhood.
