= Out of Our Heads =

1965 studio album by The Rolling Stones

- UK release

Studio album by the Rolling Stones
- Released: July 1965 (US) (Note: The authors Philippe Margotin and Jean-Michel Guesdon list the US date as 30 July 1965. However, contemporary sources prove that the album was released over a week earlier.); 24 September 1965 (UK)
- Recorded: 2 November 1964 – 1965
- Genres: Blues rock; British R&B; blue-eyed soul; rock and roll
- Length: 33:24 (US); 29:21 (UK)
- Labels: London (US); Decca (UK)
- Producer: Andrew Loog Oldham

The Rolling Stones UK chronology
Got Live If You Want It! (1965)	Out of Our Heads (1965)	Aftermath (1966)

The Rolling Stones US chronology
The Rolling Stones, Now! (1965)	Out of Our Heads (1965)	December's Children (And Everybody's) (1965)

US edition cover

Out of Our Heads is the third studio album by the English rock band the Rolling Stones, released in two editions with different covers and track listings. In the United States, London Records released it in July 1965 as the band's fourth American album, while Decca Records released its UK edition on 24 September 1965 as the third British album.

Besides key band members singer Mick Jagger, guitarists Brian Jones and Keith Richards, bassist Bill Wyman, and drummer Charlie Watts, the album contains musical contributions from former Rolling Stones member Ian Stewart. It was produced by the group's manager Andrew Loog Oldham.

As with the band's previous two albums, it consists mostly of covers of American blues, soul and rhythm and blues songs, though the group wrote some of their own material for this album (four of 12 tracks on the UK version, and six of 12 for the U.S. version). The American version contains "(I Can't Get No) Satisfaction," which would be the band's first number-one U.S. hit, and would go on to top the charts in 10 other countries, including the band's native UK; in 2004 it was ranked as the second greatest song of all time by Rolling Stone.

Out of Our Heads became the group's first number one on the American Billboard 200 album chart; in the UK it charted at number two.

== Musical style ==
The majority of the songs were written and previously recorded by American rhythm and blues artists. According to music critic Richie Unterberger, the US edition largely had mid-1960s soul covers and "classic rock singles" written by the band, including "The Last Time", "Play with Fire", and "Satisfaction", that drew on the band's R&B and blues roots, but were updated to "a more guitar-based, thoroughly contemporary context". Among the soul covers were Marvin Gaye's "Hitch Hike", Solomon Burke's "Cry to Me", and Sam Cooke's "Good Times". Kent H. Benjamin of The Austin Chronicle wrote that the album is "the culmination of the Stones' early soul/R&B sound". Writing of the UK edition, AllMusic's Bruce Eder characterised it as rock and roll and R&B. The music critic Gary Mulholland writes that the UK version begins with a key proto-punk song – the band's speedy cover of "She Said Yeah" – but otherwise, the majority of the album is "a primitive template for what would later be tagged 'blue-eyed soul'", also noting that "That's How Strong My Love Is" is a sincere deep soul track.

== Release and reception ==
Professional ratings
Review scores
Source	Rating
AllMusic	4.5/5 stars
The Encyclopedia of Popular Music	4/5 stars
Entertainment Weekly	B
Music Story	4/5 stars
NME	7/10
Record Mirror	4/5 stars
The Rolling Stone Album Guide	4.5/5 stars
Tom Hull	UK: A− US: A

Initially issued in July 1965 in the US, Out of Our Heads (featuring a shot from the same photo session that was used for the cover of 12 X 5 and The Rolling Stones No. 2) contained recordings made over six months, including the top-10 hit "The Last Time" and the worldwide number one "(I Can't Get No) Satisfaction" with B-sides as well as a track from the UK-only live EP Got Live If You Want It!. Six songs from it would be included on the UK version of the album. "One More Try" is an original that was not released in the UK until 1971's Stone Age. Riding the wave of "Satisfaction"'s success, Out of Our Heads became the Rolling Stones' first US number one album, eventually going platinum.

The British Out of Our Heads – with a different cover – added songs that would surface later in the US on December's Children (And Everybody's), and others that had not been released in the UK thus far (such as "Heart of Stone"), instead of the previously released live track and recent hit singles (as singles rarely featured on albums in the UK in those times). Issued that September, Out of Our Heads reached number two on the UK chart behind the Beatles' Help!. It was the Rolling Stones' last UK album to rely upon rhythm and blues covers; the forthcoming Aftermath was entirely composed by Mick Jagger and Keith Richards.

The US edition of the album was included in Robert Christgau's "Basic Record Library" of 1950s and 1960s recordings, published in Christgau's Record Guide: Rock Albums of the Seventies (1981). In 2003, this edition was also listed at number 114 on the list of Rolling Stone's 500 Greatest Albums of All Time, then was re-ranked at number 116 in the 2012 revised list.

Garry Mulholland, writing retrospectively in Uncut, poses that the UK version of Out of Our Heads coheres as an album better than the US version, despite both versions being "cynical [hotchpotches] of recordings from the previous six months". He wrote of the UK version: "The covers of recent American deep soul classics that dominate showcase the band's sincere love of black balladry and dance music, while the four originals point the way, hesitantly, towards the stunning pop-art group who would soon emerge on Aftermath."

In August 2002 both the US and UK editions of Out of Our Heads were reissued in a new remastered CD and SACD digipak by ABKCO Records.

== Track listing ==
=== UK edition ===
Side one
No.	Title	Writer(s)	Length
1.	"She Said Yeah"	Sonny Bono; Roddy Jackson	1:34
2.	"Mercy, Mercy"	Don Covay; Ronnie Miller	2:45
3.	"Hitch Hike"	Marvin Gaye; Clarence Paul; William "Mickey" Stevenson	2:25
4.	"That's How Strong My Love Is"	Roosevelt Jamison	2:25
5.	"Good Times"	Sam Cooke	1:58
6.	"Gotta Get Away"	Jagger–Richards	2:06
Total length:			13:13

Side two
No.	Title	Writer(s)	Length
1.	"Talkin' 'Bout You"	Chuck Berry	2:31
2.	"Cry to Me"	Bert Berns	3:09
3.	"Oh, Baby (We Got a Good Thing Going)"	Barbara Lynn	2:08
4.	"Heart of Stone"	Jagger–Richards	2:50
5.	"The Under Assistant West Coast Promotion Man"	Nanker Phelge	3:07
6.	"I'm Free"	Jagger–Richards	2:24
Total length:			16:09

=== US edition ===
Side one
No.	Title	Writer(s)	Length
1.	"Mercy, Mercy"	Covay; Miller	2:45
2.	"Hitch Hike"	Gaye; Paul; Stevenson	2:25
3.	"The Last Time"	Jagger–Richards	3:41
4.	"That's How Strong My Love Is"	Jamison	2:25
5.	"Good Times"	Cooke	1:58
6.	"I'm Alright"	Bo Diddley	2:25
Total length:			15:39

Side two
No.	Title	Writer(s)	Length
1.	"(I Can't Get No) Satisfaction"	Jagger–Richards	3:42
2.	"Cry to Me"	Berns	3:09
3.	"The Under Assistant West Coast Promotion Man"	Phelge	3:07
4.	"Play with Fire"	Phelge	2:13
5.	"The Spider and the Fly"	Jagger–Richards	3:39
6.	"One More Try"	Jagger–Richards	1:58
Total length:			17:48

Notes:

- "Oh, Baby (We Got a Good Thing Going)" and "Heart of Stone" first appeared on The Rolling Stones, Now! (1965).
- "I'm Alright" first appeared on Got Live If You Want It! (1965).
- "One More Try" was not released in the UK until Stone Age in 1971.

== Personnel ==
Personnel for both the UK (Decca) and US (London) editions; track-specific attributions are given only where reliably sourced.

=== The Rolling Stones ===
- Mick Jagger – lead vocals; backing vocals; harmonica (on "The Under Assistant West Coast Promotion Man" and "The Spider and the Fly"); tambourine (on "Play with Fire")
- Keith Richards – electric guitar; acoustic guitar (on "Play with Fire"); backing vocals
- Brian Jones – guitars; harmonica (on "The Under Assistant West Coast Promotion Man" and "One More Try"); keyboards (piano/organ, where credited)
- Bill Wyman – bass guitar
- Charlie Watts – drums; percussion

=== Additional musicians ===
- Ian Stewart – piano; organ; marimba (on "Good Times")
- Jack Nitzsche – piano (on "(I Can't Get No) Satisfaction"); organ (on "Cry to Me"); harpsichord and tam-tam (on "Play with Fire"); percussion
- Phil Spector – tuned-down electric guitar (functioning as a bass part) on "Play with Fire"
- J. W. Alexander – percussion (Chess sessions)

=== Technical ===
- Andrew Loog Oldham – producer
- David Hassinger – engineer
- Ron Malo – engineer
- Gered Mankowitz – photography

== Charts ==
Chart (1965–2025)	Peak position
Australian Albums (Kent Music Report)	2
Croatia International Albums (HDU)	17
Finland (Official Finnish Charts)	2
German Albums (Offizielle Top 100)	2
UK Albums (Official Charts)	2
US Billboard 200	1

== Certifications ==
Region	Certification	Certified units/sales
United States (RIAA)	Platinum	1,000,000^{^}
^{^} Shipments figures based on certification alone.
