= Omar Cunningham =

Southern soul and rhythm and blues singer

- Born: Omar Cunningham; 1969 (age 56–57); Gadsden, Alabama
- Occupation: Singer
- Labels: On Top Records; Endzone Entertainment; Soul 1st. Records
- Website: https://www.omarcunningham.com/

Omar Cunningham (born 1969) is an American Southern soul and rhythm and blues singer. Born in Gadsden, Alabama, United States, Cunningham developed an interest in singing at a young age. Throughout his youth, Cunningham sang with various bands, and in the early 1990s he received a BA in criminal justice. This led Cunningham to become an investigator, and in 2002 he wrote a book based on his experiences named You Be the Judge. In 2003 he released his debut album Hell at the House, which peaked at No. 53 on Billboard 's Top R&B/Hip-Hop Albums chart.

Cunningham continued releasing albums: Omar Cunningham (2004), Worth The Wait (2006), Time Served (2008), Growing Pains (2011), and Certified (2020). Furthermore, he became a common collaborator of singer Willie Clayton, and provided him with songwriting services on Clayton's albums Love, Romance, & Respect (2009), I Am Rhythm & Blues (2012), and Heart And Soul (2015). He is a credited writer for Clayton's song "We Both Grown," a collaboration between Clayton and Dave Hollister, which peaked at No. 84 on the Hot R&B/Hip-Hop Songs chart in 2010.

At the 2009 Jackson Music Awards, Cunningham won 'International Vocalist of the Year' and 'Best Recording by a Single Artist'. In 2024, he was inducted in the Alabama Blues Hall of Fame as a "Master Blues / R&B Artist".

== Early life and formative years ==
Born in Gadsden, Alabama, Cunningham developed an interest in music through stories that his grandmother told him. In the 1930s and 1940s, she ran the boarding house Owens Manor in Gadsden, hosting musicians including Fats Domino and Jerry McCain. Inspired by her stories, Cunningham listened to old records of these artists and soon decided to pursue music. At the age of seven, in 1976, while attending church, Cunningham gave his first singing performance.

As a teenager, Cunningham listened to performances at the Skyliner club from his doorstep. He admired the band Daybreak and its lead singer, Red Bird. After Red Bird quit, the band invited 19-year-old Cunningham to be their front man. Touring with Daybreak, Cunningham honed his singing skills and later collaborated on songs like "Dazzey Duks" by Duice and Cameo's album In the Face of Funk. He also joined the group Small Town Boys and played trumpet with Cameo before becoming a solo act.

== Career and education ==
=== Early 1990s to 2003: Studies, law enforcement work, and musical breakthrough ===
In the early 1990s, Cunningham attended Jacksonville State University with an undecided major. After discussing his options with his mother, she suggested criminal justice due to his interest in detective shows. He enrolled in criminal justice courses and completed the police academy at JSU. In 1995, while still in school, Cunningham joined the Etowah County Sheriff's Department, becoming an investigator before transferring to Ohatchee in 2000.

In 2002, Cunningham became a published author with You Be the Judge. Cunningham explained that the book is based on a true story about an officer's first and worst experience in law enforcement.

While, still working as a police officer, Cunningham was asked to perform one of his unrecorded songs at a friend's wedding, "Hell at the House". While another was tasked to set up a music playlist, and they recorded it for the event. Afterwards, people were asking Cunningham for a copy and he burnt them a CD from his computer. Eventually it got sufficient attention to build an album around it.

In April 2003, Cunningham released his first solo album, Hell at the House. The title track is about a man having problems with his wife. Classified as Southern soul, the album features a blues-inspired lyrical style. Drawing from his own life and his friends' experiences, Cunningham wrote 14 songs. "I write about situations in Alabama that people can relate to," he said, attributing the album's success to its relatable themes. That year the album peaked at No. 53 on Billboard's Top R&B/Hip-Hop Albums.

=== 2004 to present day: subsequent work ===
Andy Kellman of IHeartRadio explained that while his 2003 release was "his commercial peak, Cunningham steadily built a solid and unwavering solo discography that appealed to grown fans of traditionally rooted R&B."

In 2004, Cunningham released a self titled album, and in 2006 he released Worth The Wait.

In 2008, Cunningham released the album Time Served. Bill Buckley, in his review for Soul and Jazz and Funk, gave it a four out of five and wrote that "Cunningham is one of a dying breed a committed, convincing Southern soul man who knows that his music must move forward without sacrificing the integrity of its roots." He compared him to Bobby Womack, R. Kelly, and Johnnie Taylor. He felt the standout tracks were "Could You Be", "Where Would I Be", "By My Side", "Check To Check", "The Beauty Shop" and "The Same Soap". Of the album as a whole he said "there are no duds on the set."

In 2009, for his efforts in the music industry Cunningham won two Jackson Music Awards, 'International Vocalist of the Year' and 'Best Recording by a Single Artist' attributed to his song "The Beauty Shop".

During this time Cunningham worked with singer Willie Clayton, providing songwriting services or vocals for Clayton's albums Love, Romance, & Respect (2009), I Am Rhythm & Blues (2012), and Heart and Soul (2015). One of the songs, on which he is credited as a writer, he made with Clayton, "We Both Grown", features a collaboration with Dave Hollister. This track peaked at No. 84 on the Hot R&B/Hip-Hop Songs in 2010.

Cunningham released the albums Growing Pains (2011), and Certified (2020). In June 2024, his Facebook account stated that he is currently working on his next release, 'Love... the Album'.

In 2024, Cunningham was officially recognized as a "Master Blues / R&B Artist" by the Alabama Blues Hall of Fame.

== Artistry ==
Cunningham's speciality is modern Southern soul and R&B. Music producer Antonio Turner describes him as "a blues-slash-Southern soul legend.” Joy Briscoe organizer of the Blues Bash music festival in Iowa said that "Cunningham brings a contemporary sound to an old genre."

Cunningham explained he did not even hear the term 'Southern soul' until his first release in 2003. Of his style and category of music he said "you'll hear some country stuff, you'll hear some blues, you'll hear some Gospel. I don't know where that came from. It just came out and that's the category they put it in".

== Personal life ==
In 2003, Cunningham was reported to be married and have a son.

== Accolades ==
- 2009 - Winner - Jackson Music Awards - International Vocalist of the Year.
- 2009 - Winner - Jackson Music Awards - Best Recording by a Single Artist - "The Beauty Shop".
- 2024 - Inductee - Alabama Blues Hall of Fame - Master Blues / R&B Artist

== Discography ==
- Hell at the House (2003)
- Omar Cunningham (2004)
- Worth The Wait (2006)
- Time Served (2008)
- Growing Pains (2011)
- Certified (2020)

== Bibliography ==
- You Be the Judge (2002)
