= Spencer Wiggins =

American singer (1942–2023)

- Born: January 8, 1942; Memphis, Tennessee, U.S.
- Died: February 13, 2023 (aged 81)
- Genres: Soul, gospel
- Occupation: Singer
- Years active: c.1960–1973, 1999–2023
- Labels: Goldwax, Fame, Pama, Tavette, Vivid Sound

Spencer Wiggins (January 8, 1942 – February 13, 2023) was an American soul and gospel singer. He was an exponent of so-called "deep soul".

== Life and career ==
Wiggins was born in Memphis, Tennessee, where he grew up encouraged by his parents to engage with music, especially gospel; his mother sang in the choir of the Baptist Church where she attended services. He lived in the same area as singers James Carr and Bobby Bland. While at Booker T. Washington High School, he formed a gospel group with his brother Percy and sister Maxine and, on leaving school, formed an R&B group, the Four Stars, that included his brother Percy and David Porter, later to become a leading songwriter and record producer.

In the early 1960s, he began singing in clubs in Memphis, where he was discovered by Quinton Claunch, head of Goldwax Records. In 1964 Wiggins recorded his first single, "Lover's Crime", produced by Claunch, for the label, though his early recordings were licensed for release through the sub-label Bandstand USA. The recording was followed by eight further singles, but none became hits. His recordings for Goldwax included "Uptight Good Woman", written by Dan Penn and Spooner Oldham, and "I Never Loved A Woman (The Way I Love You)", recorded at the FAME Studios in Muscle Shoals with guitar by Duane Allman.

In 1969, after Goldwax collapsed, Wiggins went on to Fame Records, where he recorded two more singles, including "Double Lovin'", which reached no.44 on the Billboard R&B chart in 1970. However, other singles for Fame, and for the Pama and Vivid Sound labels, were unsuccessful.

In 1973, Wiggins left Memphis, married, and moved to Miami, Florida, where he became active in the Baptist church and in gospel music. He became a deacon and choir director at the New Birth Baptist Church in Miami, and worked with a number of gospel choirs. He had since released gospel recordings, including Keys to the Kingdom released by Tavette Records in 2003.

The Japanese label Vivid Sound released a compilation of Wiggins' singles from Goldwax, and in 2006 the Kent label issued another compilation. Due to copyright issues, however, this compilation contains fewer songs than the Japanese release.

Wiggins died on February 13, 2023, at the age of 81.

== Discography ==
=== Singles ===
- 1965: "Lover's Crime" / "What Do You Think About My Baby" (Bandstand USA 1004)
- 1966: "Take Me (Just As I Am)" / "The Child or Woman That's Got No Heart" (Goldwax 308)
- 1966: "Old Friend" / "Walking Out On You" (Goldwax 312)
- 1967: "Uptight Good Woman" / "Anything You Do is Alright" (Goldwax 321)
- 1967: "Lonely Man" / "The Power of a Woman" (Goldwax 330)
- 1968: "That's How Much I Love You" / "A Poor Man's Son" (Goldwax 333)
- 1968: "Once in a While" / "He's Too Old" (Goldwax 337)
- 1969: "I Never Loved a Woman" / "Soul City USA" (Goldwax 339)
- 1969: "Love Machine" / "Love Me Tonight" (Fame 1463)
- 1970: "Double Lovin'" / "I'd Rather Go Blind" (Fame 1470)
- 1973: "I Can Not Be Satisfied" / "Take Time to Love Your Woman" (Sounds of Memphis 716)
- 1973: "I Can Not Get Enough of You Baby" / "You're My Kind of Woman" (XL 1345)
- 1973: "Feed the Flame" / "El Paso" (XL 1347)

=== Albums ===
- 1987: Soul City USA (Vivid Sound, Japan VGCD-003)
- 1991: Soul Sounds of Memphis (Vivid Sound, Japan) (five numbers Wiggins)
- 1991: The Goldwax Collection Volume 1 (Vivid Sound, Japan) (two numbers Wiggins)
- 1999: Jump for Jesus (cassette only)
- 2002: Keys to the Kingdom (Tavette)
- 2006: The Goldwax Years (Kent CDKEND 262)
- 2010: Feed The Flame: The Fame And XL Recordings (Kent CDKEND 340)
