= Sir Charles Jones =

American blues and Southern soul singer (born 1973)

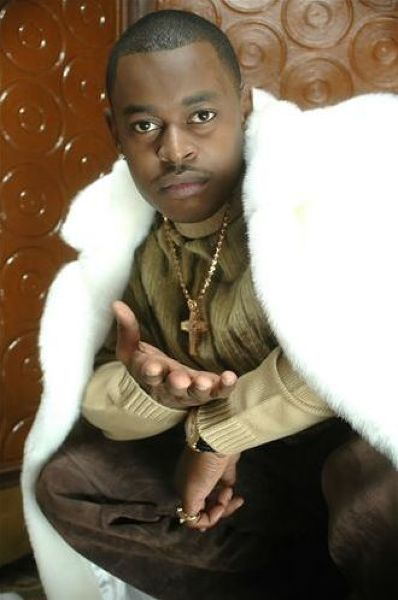
- Sir Charles Jones, American Blues & Southern Soul artist

Background information
- Born: Charles Jones; April 25, 1973 (age 53); Akron, Ohio, United States
- Genres: soul-blues, Southern soul, Retro-soul
- Occupation: Singer-songwriter,
- Instruments: Vocals, Keyboard
- Years active: 2000–present
- Labels: Mardi Gras Records (former), Independent

Sir Charles Jones (born April 25, 1973) is an American blues and Southern soul singer.

== Biography ==
Jones was born in Akron, Ohio. When he was young, his family moved to Birmingham, Alabama, where he was raised. It was in Birmingham where his singing career started. Jones taught himself how to write his own music, as well as arranging and producing it. In his early career, he worked under the guidance and tutelage of Marvin Sease. His style ranges from jazz to fusion, and from gospel to blues.

His first album, Sir Charles Jones, was released in 2000. A review in Living Blues praised Jones' vocals and stated, "for a largely-programmed effort, this disk percolates with sensuality and emotional heat." Jones' next album, Love Machine, spent 57 weeks on the U.S. Billboard Top R&B/Hip-Hop Albums chart, where it peaked at number 28 in June 2002. Living Blues credited the ballad "Is There Anybody Lonely?" for increasing the attention on Jones by soul and blues radio. The magazine added, "his success bodes well for the future of soul/blues as a viable contemporary music."

A motorcycle accident in 2003 left Jones in a coma for several days. After a long and full recovery, he released Thank You for Holding On in 2006. Two years later, he released a compilation album, My Story, and a music DVD, Sir Charles Jones: His Life & Times - Undisputed King of Southern Soul.

He continues to tour and release new music.

== Awards ==
- American Blues Network:

- International Entertainer of the year 2001-2004
- Album of the Year 2002 & 2003

- B.B. King Achievement Award 2003 & 2004

== Discography ==
=== Studio albums ===
Title	Album details	Peak chart positions		
Title	Album details	US R&B/Hip-Hop	US Blues	US Ind.
Sir Charles Jones	Released: November 7, 2000; Label: Miss Butch	84	—	—
Love Machine	Released: December 11, 2001; Label: Mardi Gras	28	—	9
A Southern Soul Party	Released: September 28, 2004; Label: Hep-Me/Mardi Gras	95	11	—
Thank You for Holding On	Released: July 11, 2006; Label: Jumpin'	—	—	—
My Story	Released: July 15, 2008; Label: Mardi Gras	83	13	—
A Tribute to the Legends	Released: November 24, 2009; Label: Mardi Gras	—	—	—

=== Video album ===
- Sir Charles Jones: His Life & Times - Undisputed King of Southern Soul (2008)
