= The Dark End of the Street =

1967 single by James Carr

Single by James Carr

from the album You Got My Mind Messed Up
- B-side: "Lovable Girl"
- Released: December 1966
- Genre: Soul; deep soul
- Length: 2:20
- Label: Goldwax
- Songwriters: Dan Penn; Chips Moman
- Producers: Quinton Claunch; Rudolph Russell

James Carr singles chronology
"Pouring Water on a Drowning Man" (1966)	"The Dark End of the Street" (1966)	"Let It Happen" (1967)

"The Dark End of the Street" is a 1967 soul song, written by songwriters Dan Penn and Chips Moman and first recorded by James Carr. It became his trademark song, reaching number 10 on Billboard Magazine's R&B Chart, and crossing over to number 77 on the Billboard Hot 100.

== History and original recording ==
The song was co-written by Penn, a professional songwriter and producer, and Moman, a former session guitarist at Gold Star Studio in Los Angeles and also the owner of American Sound Studio in Memphis, Tennessee. The song itself was ultimately recorded across town at Royal Studios, home of HI Records.

In the summer of 1966, while a DJ convention was being held in Memphis, Penn and Moman were cheating while playing cards with Florida DJ Don Schroeder, and decided to write the song while on a break. Penn said of the song “We were always wanting to come up with the best cheatin’ song. Ever.” The duo went to the hotel room of Quinton Claunch, another Muscle Shoals alumnus, and founder of Hi Records, to write. Claunch told them "Boys, you can use my room on one condition, which is that you give me that song for James Carr. They said I had a deal, and they kept their word.” The song, lyrics and all, was written in about 30 minutes.

== Chart performance ==
Chart (1967)	Peak position
US Billboard Hot 100	77
US Billboard Top Selling R&B Singles	10

== Influences ==
Van Morrison's song "Bright Side of the Road" includes the lyrics "From the dark end of the street, to the bright side of the road," which some people believe was influenced by Penn and Moman's song.

== Cover versions ==
Many artists have recorded versions of the song, but none charted as highly as Carr's version. In 1970, Aretha Franklin released a version on her album This Girl's in Love with You; this interpretation was praised by musicologist Craig Werner as adding "something absolutely original", with Franklin implying a further final step in the song's story, a determination of the illicit couple to stand together.

== Bibliography ==
- Gordon, Robert (2001). It Came from Memphis. Atria. ISBN 978-0-7434-1045-8
- Guralnick, Peter (2002). Sweet Soul Music. MOJO Books. ISBN 978-1-84195-240-6
- Hoskyns, Barney (1998). Say it One Time for the Broken Hearted. Bloomsbury Publishing PLC. ISBN 978-0-7475-4137-0
