= George Jackson (songwriter) =

American Rhythm & Blues and soul singer and songwriter

- Also known as: Bart Jackson
- Born: George Henry Jackson; March 12, 1945; Indianola, Mississippi, U.S.
- Died: April 14, 2013 (aged 68) Ridgeland, Mississippi, U.S.
- Genres: Blues, R&B, Rock and roll, Soul
- Occupations: Songwriter, singer
- Instrument: vocals
- Years active: 1963–2013
- Labels: Prann, Goldwax, Hi, Decca, Fame, MGM, Malaco, Hep Me

George Henry Jackson (March 12, 1945 – April 14, 2013) was an American blues, rhythm and blues, rock and roll/rock and soul singer-songwriter. His prominence was as a prolific and skilled songwriter: he wrote or co-wrote many hit songs for other musicians, including "Down Home Blues", "One Bad Apple", "Old Time Rock and Roll" and "The Only Way Is Up". As a southern soul singer he recorded fifteen singles between 1963 and 1985, with some success.

== Biography ==
Jackson was born in Indianola, Mississippi, and moved with his family to Greenville at the age of five. He started writing songs while in his teens, and in 1963 introduced himself to Ike Turner. Turner took him to Cosimo Matassa's studios in New Orleans to record "Nobody Wants to Cha Cha With Me" for his Prann label, but it was not successful. Jackson then traveled to Memphis to promote his songs, but was rejected by Stax before helping to form vocal group The Ovations with Louis Williams at Goldwax Records. Jackson wrote and sang on their 1965 hit "It's Wonderful To Be in Love", which reached no.61 on the Billboard Hot 100 and no.22 on the R&B chart. He also wrote for other artists at Goldwax, including Spencer Wiggins and James Carr, and recorded with Dan Greer as the duo George and Greer. After the Ovations split up in 1968, he recorded briefly for Hi Records, and also for Decca using the pseudonym Bart Jackson. As a singer, he had a versatile tenor that was influenced by Sam Cooke, and released many records over the years, for a host of different labels, but his recordings never made him a star.

At the suggestion of record producer Billy Sherrill, Jackson moved to Rick Hall's FAME Studios at Muscle Shoals in the late 1960s, Alabama, where he wrote for leading singers including Clarence Carter – whose "Too Weak To Fight" reached no.13 on the pop chart and no.3 on the R&B chart in 1968 – Wilson Pickett, and Candi Staton. Some of Jackson's songs for Staton, including her first hit in 1969, "I'd Rather Be An Old Man's Sweetheart (Than A Young Man's Fool)", are "widely regarded as examples of some of the finest southern soul ever recorded by a female artist, with lyrics that were full of meaning and innuendo, a hallmark of Jackson's best work." Jackson also recorded for Fame Records, and had his first chart success as a singer in 1970 with "That's How Much You Mean To Me", which reached no. 48 on the R&B chart. The Osmonds visited the FAME studio in 1970, and heard and liked Jackson's song "One Bad Apple", which he had originally written with The Jackson 5 in mind. The Osmonds recorded the song, and it became the group's first hit, rising to the top of the Hot 100 in February 1971; it also reached no.6 on the R&B chart.

In 1972 he briefly rejoined the Hi label, and had his second and last solo recording success with "Aretha, Sing One For Me", an answer song to Aretha Franklin's "Don't Play That Song"; Jackson's song reached no.38 on the R&B chart. He then released several singles for MGM Records, while continuing to write for other artists. In the early 1970s he began working as a songwriter for the Muscle Shoals Sound Studio and, with Thomas Jones III, wrote "Old Time Rock and Roll" which Bob Seger recorded in 1978; Seger's version reached no.28 on the pop chart. While with Muscle Shoals Sound, he also wrote "Down Home Blues", recorded by Z.Z. Hill, which became a theme tune for Malaco Records in the 1980s; "Unlock Your Mind", recorded by the Staple Singers and a no.16 R&B hit in 1978; and "The Only Way Is Up", originally recorded by Otis Clay in 1980. A version of "The Only Way Is Up" by Yazz & The Plastic Population reached no.1 on the UK singles chart, and no.2 on the Billboard dance chart, in 1988.

In 1983, Jackson formed his own publishing company, Happy Hooker Music, before joining Malaco Records as a staff songwriter. There he wrote hits for Johnnie Taylor, Bobby Bland, Latimore, Denise LaSalle, and Z.Z. Hill. He recorded an album of his own songs, Heart To Heart Collect, in 1991 for Hep' Me Records. In 2011, a compilation CD of his FAME recordings, Don't Count Me Out, was released.

Jackson died on April 14, 2013, after a long illness, at his home in Ridgeland, Mississippi, at the age of 68. He left a son and two grandchildren.

== Samples and interpolation of his songs in anothers' ==
- In 2000 Ghostface Killah sampled "Aretha, Sing One for Me" in the song "Child's Play" on the album Supreme Clientele.
- In 2018 Kanye West sampled "I Can't Do Without You" in the song "Come Back Baby" on Pusha T’s album Daytona.

== Discography ==
=== Albums ===
- 1991 : Heart To Heart Collect
- 2002 : George Jackson in Muscle Shoals
- 2006 : What Would Your Mama Say
- 2009 : In Memphis 1972–77
- 2010 : All Because Of Your Love
- 2011 : Don't Count Me Out: The Fame Recordings (Volume 1)
- 2012 : Let the Best Man Win: The Fame Recordings (Volume 2)
- 2013 : Old Friend: The Fame Recordings (Volume 3)
