= Lenow, Tennessee =

Unincorporated community in Tennessee, United States

Coordinates: 35°11′11″N 89°43′50″W

Lenow is an unincorporated community in Shelby County, Tennessee, United States. The Nashville, Chattanooga and St Louis Railway once ran through Lenow, along Lenow Road, an important route from Memphis to Nashville. This route was considered nonessential and was dug up in 1968.
