= Home Cookin' (band) =

Home Cookin’ is a horn-based soul band that played in the Las Vegas local scene from 1989 to 2000. Described by drummer and video game composer Frank Klepacki as "just a good-time, funky dance band", the band has been compared to Tower of Power and featured a five-man horn section. Robins recalled, "We were together for a couple of years and wanted to do some serious recording. I was working at a pizza place, making nothing. Pretty soon I realized, where's the money going to come from? If I'm going to do anything seriously musically, I've got to get some money first - and some knowledge." The band became active again around 1995 Around the mid 1990s, the band grew to include ten members, including a five-man horn section and drums played by video game music composer Frank Klepacki. The group released their debut album in 1997, named Mmm, Mmm, Mmm, and featuring fourteen tracks. Track nine, Soul Space Express, appeared on Road Rash: Jailbreak and the television series Cupid, while X-Rated Superstar was a number one hit and received regular airplay on Vegas's KXTE-FM Xtreme Disorder format. Playboy playmate Corinna Harney volunteered to appear on the album's cover. The success of this song sparked a racy music video, which was given airplay on MTV for a brief period. Home Cookin' songs were regularly included on Las Vegas scene compilation albums.

Klepacki explained in an interview about their then-unreleased next album that Home Cookin' did not want to get signed, but rather "work with a label, not for them." To this end, they created their own "Fly Records" release label. Despite setbacks in losing two band members, group followed up with a second album of thirteen songs in 2000—Pink in the Middle—and promoted their work online through local band websites. In March, Klepacki touted Home Cookin' as something for visitors "looking for something unique besides the casinos and ritzy stuff." The band won "Best Band" at a competition in Malibu while X-Rated Remix appeared in the film An American Vampire Story. Home Cookin' was voted "Best Horns" by Las Vegas Weekly and their albums were voted "Best Local CD" certain years by Las Vegas audiophiles. Klepacki contended in 2000 that turnout for the band at clubs was usually above four hundred people. Towards the end of its run, the band played at Quark's Bar in Star Trek: The Experience and at the Boston Grill and Bar. Home Cookin' sometimes opened shows with a four member funk act named Junkfood in this period. The group then launched an extended tour of California, but disbanded late in the year after recording "Rudolph the Red-Nosed Reindeer" for a local Christmas album. Frank Klepacki continues to support the band's music by selling copies of the albums through his website.

Home Cookin' returned to the Las Vegas music scene in 2011 with performances at the M Resort and Palms Hotel & Casino. Home Cookin' is currently the artist in residence at the Triple B Nightclub every First Friday in Fremont East District in Downtown Las Vegas, Nevada.

== Personnel ==
- Jordan Robins - vocals Founding member (1989-current)
- Frank Klepacki - drums (1995-2000, current)
- Rob Mader - Alto saxophone Founding member (1987-2022, current)
- Ryan Bull - Electric guitar (1998-2000)
- Russell Burt - Tenor saxophone (1990-2000, current)
- Glenn Colby - Trumpet (1990-2022, current)
- Dave Philippus - Bones (1996-2000, current)
- Steve Dawson - Baritone saxophone (1997-1998, current)
- Steve Barclay - Bass guitar (1997-1999, current)

Alumni

- Jason Colby - Trumpet (1996-2000)
- Dave Baker - Electric guitar Founding member(1989-1998, deceased)
- Jon Cornell - Bass guitar (1999-2000)
- Tom Pastor - Baritone saxophone (1998-2000)
- Joe Malone - percussion (1991-2000)
- Hal Floyd - Bass guitar (1996-1997)
- Joe Hamrock - Bass guitar Founding member(1989-1992)
- Fito Ruiz - Bones (1990-1992, deceased)
- Donny Thompson - Percussion (1989-1991)
- Nate McClenden - Baritone saxophone (1990-1992)
- Mike Mitlyng - Drums Founding member (1989-1992)
- Daryl Williams - Bass guitar (1997)

== Discography ==
Soul Space Express by Home Cookin'
A 35 second sample of Soul Space Express, demonstrating the band's soul / rock fusion

Rump Roast by Home Cookin'
A 35 second sample of Rumproast, featured on Pink in the Middle

- Mmm, Mmm, Mmm, – 1997
- Pink in the Middle – 2000
