= Quinton Claunch =

American musician (1921–2021)

- Born: Quinton Mavis Claunch; December 3, 1921; Tishomingo, Mississippi, U.S.
- Died: April 10, 2021 (aged 99); Memphis, Tennessee, U.S.
- Occupations: Musician, songwriter, record producer, record label owner
- Known for: Hi Records; Goldwax Records

Quinton Mavis Claunch (December 3, 1921 – April 10, 2021) was an American musician, songwriter, record producer and record label owner, who was responsible with others for setting up Hi Records in the 1950s and Goldwax Records in the 1960s.

== Biography ==
He was born in Tishomingo, Mississippi, and moved in the early 1940s to Muscle Shoals, Alabama. He played guitar in local country music groups and in 1943 formed a band, the Blue Seal Pals, with Edgar Clayton; one of the other band members was Bill Cantrell. The group had a regular slot on radio station WLAY in Muscle Shoals before moving to station WJOI in Florence and then to WSM in Nashville where they became a staple of the Grand Ole Opry.

After he married in 1948, Claunch moved to Memphis, Tennessee, where he met up with old friend and former WLAY disc jockey Sam Phillips. Claunch played guitar on some early Sun recordings, by Carl Perkins, Charlie Feathers, Wanda Jackson and others, as well as establishing a hardware company. In 1954, with Cantrell, he wrote the song "Daydreamin'" for singer Bud Deckelman; the song became a national country hit for Jimmy Newman.

He and Cantrell then decided to form their own record label, Hi Records, in 1957, with Ray Harris and Joe Cuoghi. Claunch was also responsible for record production, and for songwriting; in total, he is credited with over 200 original compositions at BMI, mostly in conjunction with other writers including George Jackson. After establishing Hi as a moderately successful local label, Claunch sold his interest in the company in 1959 and left the music industry, so as to develop his hardware business.

In 1964, he returned to the music business to establish, with partner Rudolph V. "Doc" Russell, Goldwax Records, a label specialising in Southern soul and gospel music. The company had a series of R&B hits, by James Carr, The Ovations, Spencer Wiggins and others. The label folded in 1969, due to differences between Claunch and Russell as well as Carr's erratic behaviour. In the mid 1980s, the company was re-launched by Memphis businessman Elliott Clark, and Claunch became its President, but he left again in the 1990s.

Claunch died in Memphis, Tennessee, in April 2021 at the age of 99.
