= Goldwax Records =

US record label

Gold illyes Records
- Founded: 1964
- Country of origin: United States
- Location: Memphis, Tennessee

Goldwax Records was an American record label founded in Memphis, Tennessee, United States, in 1964 by Quinton Claunch and Rudolph V. "Doc" Russell.

== History ==
Claunch was a hardware store owner who had previously worked as a country music guitarist, a session musician at Sun Records, a songwriter, and a record producer, and had co-founded Hi Records in 1957 before selling his stake two years later. Russell was a pharmacist who was interested in becoming involved in the music business.

The label had its biggest successes with James Carr, who had a series of hits on the R&B chart between 1967 and 1969, including "You've Got My Mind Messed Up" and "The Dark End of the Street". It also had some success with The Ovations, Spencer Wiggins, and Wee Willie Walker. The label was dissolved in 1969, as a result of differences between Claunch and Russell as well as Carr's erratic behaviour. In the mid 1980s, the company was re-launched by Memphis businessman Elliott Clark, and Claunch became its President, but he left again in the 1990s.

== Notable artists ==
- James Carr
- Spencer Wiggins
- The Ovations
- Percy Milem
- The Lyrics
- O.V. Wright
- George Jackson
- Wee Willie Walker
- Timmy Thomas
- Eddie Jefferson
- George and Greer
- Barbara Perry
- Gene Miller
- Drothy Williams
- Eddie Bond
- Ben Atkins
- Jeb Stuart

== See also ==
- Stax Records
- Hi Records
- Fame Studios
- TK Records
- Malaco Records
- Ichiban Records
- Southern soul
