= Southern soul =

Music genre

- Stylistic origins: Soul; blues; country; rhythm and blues; gospel
- Cultural origins: Late 1950s, Southern United States
- Derivative forms: Memphis soul; New Orleans soul

Other topics
- Northern soul; Southern rock

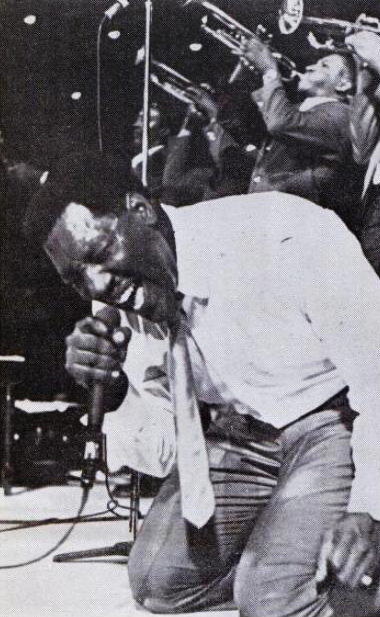
Ad of Otis Redding's single "Fa-Fa-Fa-Fa-Fa (Sad Song)"

Southern soul or country soul is a type of soul and country music that emerged from the Southern United States. The music originated from a combination of styles, including blues (both 12 bar and jump), country, early R&B, and a strong gospel influence that emanated from the sounds of Southern black churches. Bass guitar, drums, horn section, organ, and gospel roots vocal are important to soul groove. This rhythmic force made it a strong influence in the rise of funk music. The terms "deep soul", "country soul", "downhome soul" and "hard soul" have been used synonymously with "Southern soul".^{p. 18}

== History ==
=== 1960s–1980s ===
Some soul musicians were from southern states: these included Georgia natives Otis Redding and James Brown, Rufus Thomas and Bobby "Blue" Bland (from Tennessee), Eddie Floyd (from Alabama), and Johnnie Taylor and Al Green (from Arkansas).

Southern soul was at its peak through the 1960s, when Memphis soul and the Muscle Shoals sound were popular. In 1963, Stan Lewis founded Jewel Records in Shreveport, Louisiana, along with two subsidiary labels, Paula and Ronn. Lewis signed soul and blues artists such as Toissaint McCall, Bobby Rush, John Lee Hooker, Charles Brown, Buster Benton, Lightnin’ Hopkins, Ted Taylor and Little Johnny Taylor. In 1966, the Shreveport-based Murco Records released "Losin' Boy" by Eddy Giles, which held a place on Cashbox magazine's Hot 100 for five weeks. Murco Records had soul chart success with its other artist included Reuben Bell.

Other significant contributors were Stax Records with their house band Booker T. & the MGs as well as New York based Label Atlantic Records. Atlantic was Ray Charles's home, and became an early exporter of the "Muscle Shoals Sound" by distributing Percy Sledge's "When a Man Loves a Woman", recorded at Rick Hall's FAME Studios. FAME becoming the studio of choice for new and experienced artists alike. Establishing the city of Muscle Shoals, Alabama as a major part of Southern soul. Aretha Franklin credits FAME as the place her career turned around, and Etta James recorded hit album "Tell Mama" there.

The Stax label's most successful artist of the 1960s, Otis Redding, was influenced by fellow Georgia native Little Richard and the more cosmopolitan sounds of Mississippi-born Sam Cooke. Other Stax artists of note included Johnnie Taylor, Soul Children, the Dramatics (from Detroit), Eddie Floyd, the Staple Singers, Carla Thomas, and Isaac Hayes. Atlantic Records artists Sam & Dave's records were released on the Stax label and featured the MGs. Wilson Pickett launched his solo career through his collaboration with the Stax team, and Pickett gained big hit "Land of a Thousand Dances" with FAME Studios musicians in Muscle Shoals, Alabama.

After Sam & Dave moved from Stax to Atlantic Records, Stax producer David Porter and his songwriting and production partner Isaac Hayes decided to put together a new vocal group of two men and two women. They recruited J. Blackfoot, together with Norman West, Anita Louis, and Shelbra Bennett, to form the Soul Children. Between 1968 and 1978, the Soul Children had 15 hits on the R&B chart, including three that crossed over to the Billboard Hot 100, and recorded seven albums.

Another Memphis 1960s label Goldwax Records, featured James Carr, Spencer Wiggins, and the Ovations. Al Green, Otis Clay, O.V. Wright, Don Bryant, Ann Peebles and Quiet Elegance recorded for Memphis's 70s label Hi Records, where they were produced by Willie Mitchell.

Rick Hall was a R&B producer of "Muscle Shoals Sound", originating from Muscle Shoals, Alabama. The Muscle Shoals Rhythm Section played on hits by many Stax artists during the late 1960s through the mid-1970s, and Atlantic Records artists Wilson Pickett, Percy Sledge, Joe Tex and Aretha Franklin. Producer and session guitarist Chips Moman produced Bobby Womack and Womack wrote R&B song "I'm in Love" for Wilson Pickett. Bobby Womack gained R&B hit "If You Think You're Lonely Now" in 1981.

Malaco Records introduced Dorothy Moore, Bobby Bland, Johnnie Taylor, Denise Lasalle, Little Milton and others. In 1983, former Soul Children singer J. Blackfoot saw success on soul chart with his single "Taxi". In 1987, Marvin Sease gained an R&B hit with "Candy Licker".

=== 1990s–present ===
After 1990, Southern soul music was still recorded and performed by singers such as Sharon Jones, Charles Bradley, Peggy Scott-Adams, Trudy Lynn, Roy C, Sir Charles Jones, Barbara Carr, Willie Clayton, Bobby Rush, Denise LaSalle, Gwen McCrae, Johnnie Taylor, Omar Cunningham, and William Bell.

In 2025, the Southern soul music "Boots on the Ground" song by 803 Fresh became a viral sensation.

== See also ==
- Northern soul
- Rhythm and blues
- Blues
- Soul
- Gospel
- Gospel blues
- Soul blues
- Beach music
