= James Carr (singer) =

American R&B and soul singer (1942–2001)

Background information
- Born: James Edward Carr; June 13, 1942; Coahoma, Mississippi, U.S.
- Died: January 7, 2001 (aged 58) Memphis, Tennessee, U.S.
- Genres: Rhythm and blues, soul
- Years active: 1966-1990s
- Label: Goldwax Records

James Edward Carr (June 13, 1942 – January 7, 2001) was an American R&B and soul singer, described as "one of the greatest pure vocalists that deep Southern soul ever produced".

== Biography ==
Born to a Baptist preacher's family in Coahoma, Mississippi, he moved with his parents to Memphis, Tennessee, at the age of three. Carr began singing in church, and performed in gospel groups including the Harmony Echoes, at the same time as making tables on an assembly line in Memphis. After being turned down by Stax, he made his first recordings for Goldwax Records, a small Memphis-based independent record label, in 1964. He released several singles for the label before achieving his first success in 1966, when "You've Got My Mind Messed Up" reached number 7 on the Billboard R&B chart and number 63 on the pop chart. He also released the successful and critically acclaimed album You Got My Mind Messed Up.

Carr continued to have chart entries with his later singles on Goldwax, including "Pouring Water on a Drowning Man", but his greatest success and most critically acclaimed performance came in 1967 with his original recording of "The Dark End of the Street", written by Dan Penn and Chips Moman. The song reached number 10 on the R&B chart and number 77 on the pop chart. Carr continued to record for Goldwax until the label closed in 1969, but failed to reach the same heights with his subsequent releases, though "A Man Needs a Woman" in 1968 reached number 16 on the R&B chart and number 63 on the pop chart, and he recorded an album of the same title. After Goldwax closed down in 1969, he released a single on Atlantic Records in 1971, and another on his manager Roosevelt Jamison's River City label in 1977.

Carr suffered from bipolar disorder for most of his life. This frequently found him unable to deal with the stress of performing and touring, which became most evident during a tour of Japan in 1979 when he froze in front of an audience, following an overdose of antidepressants. Despite this he was dubbed "the world's greatest Soul Singer". However, he completed the Japan tour before returning to Memphis. Thereafter he lived with his sister but was frequently hospitalized. A resurgence in interest in his music, spurred by his portrayal in Peter Guralnick's 1986 book Sweet Soul Music, helped return Carr to the recording studio, and he was able to complete another album, Take Me to the Limit, for a revived Goldwax label in 1991. He also performed at festivals in the US and Europe, and released another album, Soul Survivor, in 1994. His signature song "The Dark End of the Street" gained further recognition when it was prominently featured in The Commitments, a film about working-class Irish youths forming a soul band.

He was diagnosed with lung cancer in the mid-1990s, and died in a Memphis nursing home in 2001, aged 58.

== Discography ==
=== Singles ===
- "You've Got My Mind Messed Up" (1966) R&B No. 7, Pop No. 63
- "Love Attack" (1966) R&B No. 21, Pop No. 99
- "Pouring Water on a Drowning Man" (1966) R&B No. 23, Pop No. 85
- "The Dark End of the Street" (1967) R&B No. 10, Pop No. 77
- "Let It Happen" (1967) R&B No. 30, Pop No. 106
- "I'm a Fool for You" (duet with an uncredited Betty Harris) (1967) R&B No. 42, Pop No. 97
- "A Man Needs a Woman" (1968) R&B No. 16, Pop No. 63
- "Life Turned Her That Way" (1968) Pop No. 112
- "Freedom Train" (1969) R&B No. 39
- "To Love Somebody" (1969) R&B No. 44

=== Albums ===
- You Got My Mind Messed Up (1967) R&B: No. 25
- A Man Needs a Woman (1968)
- Take Me To The Limit (1991)
- Soul Survivor (1994)

=== Compilations ===
- Complete, Vol. 1 (1994) Goldwax
- Complete, Vol. 2 (1994) Goldwax
- The Essential James Carr (1995) Razor & Tie
- 24 Karat Soul (2001) Soultrax
- The Complete Goldwax Singles (2001) Kent UK
- My Soul Is Satisfied: The Rest of James Carr (2004) Kent UK
- A Man Worth Knowing: The 1990s Goldwax & Soultrax Recordings (2006) Ace UK
