= Otis Redding discography =

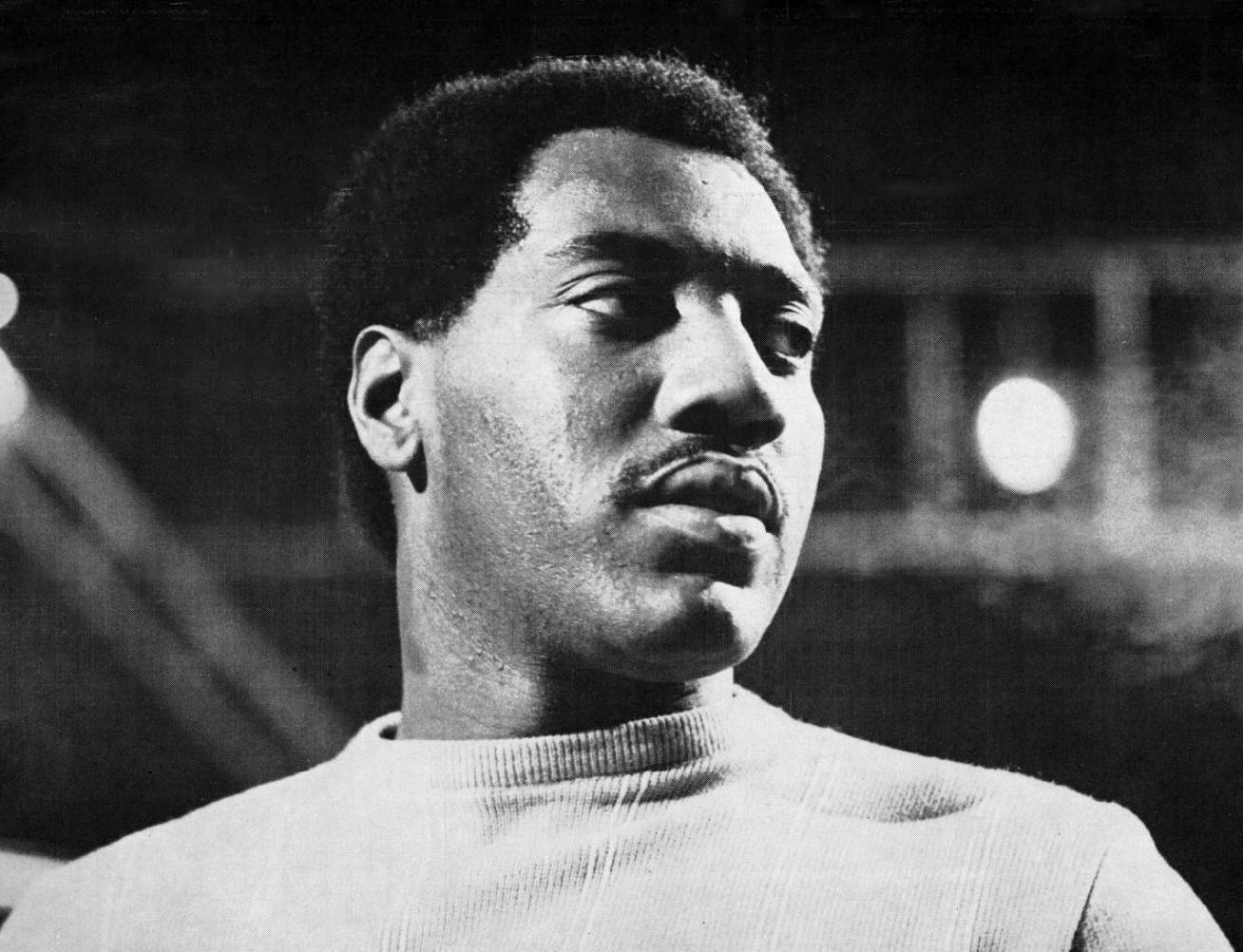
- Studio albums: 10
- Live albums: 9
- Compilation albums: 15
- Singles: 48

This is the discography of the American soul singer Otis Redding.

== Studio albums ==
Title	Album details	Chart positions			Certifications
Title	Album details	US	US R&B	UK	Certifications
Pain in My Heart	Released: March, 1964; Label: Atco Records	103	20	28	
The Great Otis Redding Sings Soul Ballads	Released: March, 1965; Label: Volt Records	147	3	30	
Otis Blue/Otis Redding Sings Soul	Released: September 15, 1965; Label: Volt	75	1	6	BPI: Gold
The Soul Album	Released: April 1, 1966; Label: Volt	54	3	22	
Complete & Unbelievable: The Otis Redding Dictionary of Soul	Released: October 15, 1966; Label: Volt	73	5	23	
King & Queen (with Carla Thomas)	Released: March 16, 1967; Label: Stax Records	36	5	18	

=== Posthumous studio albums ===
Otis Redding's death prompted a number of releases, including live albums and compilations. Four albums of mostly new material were released, but they are more like compilations than official studio releases.

The first of these releases, The Dock of the Bay, assembled by guitarist and producer Steve Cropper, is made up of previously released singles and b-sides as well as some album tracks and a few previously unissued recordings. The other three of these albums contain a greater amount of previously unreleased material. The posthumous collections are generally considered to be of good quality, which is unusual, as many posthumous releases by other artists receive unfavorable reviews.

A fifth release, Remember Me, came out on 20 March 1992, featuring 22 unreleased tracks taken from Redding's 1963–1967 recordings, with numerous unreleased and stereo recordings. Two alternate takes of "(Sittin' on) The Dock of the Bay" and alternate takes of other famous tracks, such as "Respect", "Come to Me", and "Try a Little Tenderness", are among its highlights.

Title	Album details	Chart positions						Certifications
Title	Album details	US	US R&B	FRA	GER	NOR	UK	Certifications
The Dock of the Bay	Released: February 23, 1968; Label: Volt	4	1	137	17	3	1	
The Immortal Otis Redding	Released: June, 1968; Label: Atco	58	3	–	–	–	19	
Love Man	Released: June 20, 1969; Label: Atco	46	8	–	–	–	–	
Tell the Truth	Released: July 1, 1970; Label: Atco	200	26	–	–	–	–	
Remember Me	Released: March 29, 1992; Label: Atco	–	–	–	–	–	–	

== Live albums ==
Officially released live recordings by Otis Redding primarily come from three sources: a series of shows performed at the Whisky a Go Go in April 1966, the Stax/Volt Revue tour of Europe in March and April 1967, and his five-song set at the Monterey International Pop Festival on June 17, 1967.

Earlier live performances of "Pain in My Heart" and "These Arms of Mine" from November 16, 1963, were officially released on the Atco compilation album Apollo Saturday Night in 1964. These two performances are also included in the 1993 box set Otis! The Definitive Otis Redding.

Title	Album details	Chart positions					Certifications
Title	Album details	US	US R&B	CAN	GER	UK	Certifications
Live in Europe	Released: July 10, 1967; Label: Volt; Recorded: March 1967	32	8	–	–	14	
In Person at the Whisky a Go Go	Released: October, 1968; Label: Atco; Recorded: April 1966	82	7	–	–	–	
Historic Performances Recorded at the Monterey International Pop Festival (with The Jimi Hendrix Experience)	Released: August 26, 1970; Label: Reprise Records; Recorded: June 17, 1967	16	15	43	9	–	RIAA: Gold
Recorded Live: Previously Unreleased Performances	Released: 1982; Label: Atlantic Records; Recorded: April 1966	–	–	–	–	–	
Good to Me: Live at the Whisky a Go Go, Vol. 2	Released: 1993; Label: Stax; Recorded: April 1966	200	–	–	–	–	
In Concert	Released: 1999; Label: Stax; Recorded: April 1966 & March 1967	–	–	–	–	–	
Live in London and Paris	Released: 2008; Label: Stax; Recorded: March 1967	–	–	–	–	–	
Respect: Live 1967	Released: 2009; Label: Shout! Factory	–	–	–	–	–	
Live on the Sunset Strip	Released: 2010; Label: Stax; Recorded: April 1966	–	66	–	–	–	
Live at the Whisky a Go Go: The Complete Recordings	Released: 2016; Label: Stax; Recorded: April 1966	–	–	–	–	–	

== Compilation albums ==
=== Charted compilations ===
Title	Album details	Chart positions								Certifications
Title	Album details	US	US R&B	AUS	BEL (Wa)	NL	NZ	SWI	UK	Certifications
The History of Otis Redding	Released: 1967; Label: Volt	9	1	–	–	–	–	–	2	
The Best of Otis Redding	Released: 1972; Label: Atco	76	34	–	–	–	–	–	–	
The Dock of the Bay – The Definitive Collection	Released: 1987; Label: Atlantic	–	–	–	–	56	–	–	50	ARIA: Gold; BPI: 2× Platinum
The Very Best of Otis Redding, Vol. 1	Released: 1992; Label: Rhino	–	–	–	–	–	–	–	26	RIAA: 2× Platinum; BPI: Gold
Dreams to Remember: The Otis Redding Anthology	Released: 1998; Label: Rhino Records	–	–	–	–	62	–	–	–	
Pure Southern Soul: Otis Redding	Released: 2007; Label: Rhino	160	–	–	–	–	–	–	–	
The Very Best Of Aretha Franklin & Otis Redding Together	Released: 2012; Label: Rhino	–	–	19	77	–	11	12	–	BPI: Silver

=== Other compilations ===
- Soul as Sung by Otis Redding and Little Joe Curtis (1968, Alshire Presents)
- Ten Years Gone (1977, Atlantic; Japan-only 3-LP compilation)
- The Ultimate Otis Redding (1986, Warner Bros.)
- The Otis Redding Story (1987, Atlantic)
- Otis! The Definitive Otis Redding (1993, Rhino)
- The Very Best of Otis Redding, Vol. 2 (1995, Rhino)
- I've Been Loving You Too Long and Other Hits (1997, Rhino/Flashback). RIAA: Gold
- Love Songs (1998, Rhino). BPI: Silver
- Stax Profiles (2006, Stax)
- The Definitive Soul Collection (2006, Rhino). BPI: Gold
- The Best: See & Hear, Otis Redding (2009, Shout! Factory)
- Soul Legend - The Best of Otis Redding (2011, Music Club Deluxe/MCI)
- Lonely & Blue - The Deepest Soul of Otis Redding (2013, Stax)
- The Complete Stax/Volt Singles Collection (2013, Shout! Factory)
- Soul Manifesto: 1964-1970 (2015, Rhino)

== Singles ==
Title	Year	Chart positions				Certifications	Album
Title	Year	US	US R&B	NL	UK	Certifications	Album
"She's All Right" (as Otis Redding and The Shooters) b/w "Tuff Enuff" (The Shooters)	1960	–	–	–	–		Non-album tracks
"Gettin' Hip" b/w "Gamma Lama"	1960	–	–	–	–		Non-album tracks
"Shout Bamalama" b/w "Fat Gal"	1961	–	–	–	–		Non-album tracks
"These Arms of Mine" b/w "Hey, Hey Baby"	1962	85	20	–	–	RIAA: Gold; BPI: Silver	Pain in My Heart
"That's What My Heart Needs" b/w "Mary's Little Lamb" (non-album track)	1963	–	27	–	–		Pain in My Heart
"Pain in My Heart" b/w "Something is Worrying Me"	1963	61	11	–	–		Pain in My Heart
"Come to Me" b/w "Don't Leave Me This Way" (non-album track)	1964	69	26	–	–		The Great Otis Redding Sings Soul Ballads
"Security" b/w "I Want To Thank You" (from The Great Otis Redding Sings Soul Ballads)	1964	97	23	–	–		Pain in My Heart
"Chained and Bound" b/w "Your One and Only Man"	1964	70	6	–	–		The Great Otis Redding Sings Soul Ballads
"Mr. Pitiful"	1964	41	10	–	–		The Great Otis Redding Sings Soul Ballads
"That's How Strong My Love Is"	1964	74	18	–	–		The Great Otis Redding Sings Soul Ballads
"I've Been Loving You Too Long" b/w "I'm Depending on You" (non-album track)	1965	21	2	–	–	RIAA: Gold; BPI: Silver	Otis Blue: Otis Redding Sings Soul
"Respect" b/w "Ole Man Trouble"	1965	35	4	–	–		Otis Blue: Otis Redding Sings Soul
"Just One More Day"	1965	85	15	–	29		The Soul Album
"I Can't Turn You Loose"	1965	–	11	–	–		History of Otis Redding
"My Girl" b/w "Down in the Valley"	1965	–	–	–	11	BPI: Silver	Otis Blue: Otis Redding Sings Soul
"(I Can't Get No) Satisfaction" b/w "Any Ole Way" (from The Soul Album)	1966	31	4	–	33		Otis Blue: Otis Redding Sings Soul
"My Lover's Prayer" b/w "Don't Mess with Cupid" (from The Dock Of The Bay)	1966	61	10	–	37		Complete & Unbelievable: The Otis Redding Dictionary of Soul
"Fa-Fa-Fa-Fa-Fa (Sad Song)" b/w "Good to Me" (from The Soul Album)	1966	29	12	–	23		Complete & Unbelievable: The Otis Redding Dictionary of Soul
"Try a Little Tenderness" b/w "I'm Sick Y'all"	1967	25	4	–	46	RIAA: Gold; BPI: Silver	Complete & Unbelievable: The Otis Redding Dictionary of Soul
"Day Tripper" b/w "Shake" (from Otis Blue: Otis Redding Sings Soul)	1967	–	–	–	43		Complete & Unbelievable: The Otis Redding Dictionary of Soul
"I Love You More Than Words Can Say"	1967	78	30	–	–		The Dock of the Bay
"Let Me Come on Home"	1967	–	–	–	48		The Dock of the Bay
"Shake" (live) b/w "You Don't Miss Your Water" (from Otis Blue: Otis Redding Sings Soul)	1967	47	16	–	28		Live in Europe
"Tramp" (with Carla Thomas) b/w "Tell It Like It Is"	1967	26	2	15	18		King & Queen
"Knock on Wood" (with Carla Thomas) b/w "Let Me Be Good to You"	1967	30	8	–	35		King & Queen
"Glory of Love" b/w "I'm Coming Home"	1967	60	19	–	–		The Dock of the Bay

=== Posthumous singles ===
Title	Year	Chart positions								Certifications	Album
Title	Year	US	US R&B	BEL (Wa)	FRA	GER	NL	SWI	UK	Certifications	Album
"(Sittin' On) The Dock of the Bay" b/w "Sweet Lorene" (from Complete & Unbelievable: The Otis Redding Dictionary of Soul)	1968	1	1	4	79	16	4	7	3	RIAA: 3× Platinum; BPI: 3× Platinum	The Dock of the Bay
"The Happy Song (Dum-Dum)" b/w "Open the Door" (from The Dock of the Bay)	1968	25	10	19	–	–	17	–	24		The Immortal Otis Redding
"Amen"	1968	36	15	36	–	–	20	–	–		The Immortal Otis Redding
"Hard to Handle"	1968	51	38	36	–	–	–	–	15		The Immortal Otis Redding
"I've Got Dreams to Remember" b/w "Nobody's Fault but Mine"	1968	41	6	–	–	–	7	–	–		The Immortal Otis Redding
"Lovey Dovey" (with Carla Thomas) b/w "New Year's Resolution"	1968	60	21	–	–	–	–	–	–		King & Queen
"White Christmas" b/w "Merry Christmas, Baby"	1968	–	–	–	–	–	–	–	–		Non-album tracks
"Papa's Got a Brand New Bag" (live) b/w "Direct Me" (from Love Man)	1968	21	10	–	–	–	–	–	–		In Person at the Whisky a Go Go
"A Lover's Question" b/w "You Made a Man out of Me" (from The Immortal Otis Redding)	1969	48	20	–	–	–	–	–	–		Love Man
"When Something Is Wrong with My Baby" (with Carla Thomas) b/w "Ooh Carla, Ooh Otis"	1969	–	–	–	–	–	–	–	–		King & Queen
"Love Man" b/w "Can't Turn You Loose" (from Live in Europe)	1969	72	17	–	–	–	–	–	43		Love Man
"Free Me" b/w "Your Love Has Lifted Me (Higher and Higher)"	1969	103	30	–	–	–	–	–	–		Love Man
"Look at the Girl" b/w "That's a Good Idea"	1969	–	–	–	–	–	–	–	–		Love Man
"Demonstration" b/w "Johnny's Heartbreak"	1969	105	32	–	–	–	–	–	–		Tell the Truth
"Give Away None of My Love" b/w "Snatch a Little Piece"	1970	–	–	–	–	–	–	–	–		Tell the Truth
"I've Been Loving You Too Long" (live) b/w "Try a Little Tenderness" (live)	1971	110	–	–	–	–	–	–	–		Monterey Pop Soundtrack
"You Left the Water Running" b/w "The Otis Jam" (by Memphis studio band)	1976	–	–	–	–	–	–	–	–		Non-album tracks

=== As featured artist ===
Single	Year	Peak chart positions								Certifications	Album
Single	Year	US	US R&B	AUS	CAN	FRA	NL	SWI	UK	Certifications	Album
"Otis" (Jay-Z and Kanye West featuring Otis Redding)	2011	12	2	42	37	69	73	61	28	RIAA: 3× Platinum; BPI: Platinum; MC: Gold	Watch the Throne
