= Do the Twist =

Do the Twist may refer to:

- Do the Twist (Connie Francis album), 1962
- Do the Twist! with Ray Charles, a 1961 album by Ray Charles
- "The Twist" (song), a song by Hank Ballard, covered by Chubby Checker
