= The Dock of the Bay (disambiguation) =

"(Sittin' On) The Dock of the Bay" is a 1968 song by Otis Redding.

(The) Dock of the Bay may also refer to:

- The Dock of the Bay (album), a 1968 album by Otis Redding
- The Dock of the Bay – The Definitive Collection, a 1987 compilation album by Otis Redding
- Dock of the Bay (newspaper), an American radical New Left underground newspaper
