= Live at the Whisky a Go Go: The Complete Recordings =

Live album by Otis Redding
- Released: October 21, 2016
- Recorded: April 8–10, 1966
- Venue: Whisky a Go Go, Los Angeles
- Genre: Soul music
- Label: Stax

Live at the Whisky a Go Go: The Complete Recordings is a live album by Otis Redding, recorded at the Whisky a Go Go in Los Angeles, California, in 1966. Encompassing shorter previous releases, this digitally remixed edition includes all of Redding's performances from his three-night engagement at the venue. The album won a Grammy Award for Best Album Notes.

== Background ==
The recordings were made from a series of seven performances that Redding played over three successive nights (April 8–10, 1966) at the Whisky a Go Go on Sunset Strip in Los Angeles. He was backed by his ten-piece touring band, the Otis Redding Revue. Earlier albums, including In Person at the Whisky a Go Go (1968) and Good to Me: Live at the Whisky a Go Go, Vol. 2 (1983), had featured selections from the shows, but the 2016 release comprehensively captures all seven performances in their entirety.

== Production and release ==
Original 4-track tapes of the shows were newly mixed by audio engineer Seth Presant. The finished product was released through Redding's original Stax Records label (now a subsidiary of Concord Records) on October 21, 2016. The 6-disc box set was also made available as a digital download, and excerpts were pressed on limited edition vinyl LPs.

== Critical reception ==
A rarity in its completeness, Live at the Whisky A Go Go: The Complete Recordings has been praised for preserving "vital live soul from an era where the sound was in its prime but was rarely recorded", and the album has been called "in a word, essential". The performances themselves have been described as "explosively transcendent"

There is arguably a surfeit of material on the collection – "there are, count them, ten separate versions of 'Satisfaction' that even the most hardcore Redding and/or Rolling Stones fans may find to be more than enough", noted one reviewer from Jambands, while another from BlackGrooves remarked, "I’m not convinced that Redding would have wanted the complete package released [because] the performances just weren’t good and consistent enough". In contrast, the reviewer from Pitchfork wrote, "Listening to the sets back to back, it’s hard to hear where the band allegedly strays off path: Whatever flaws that may exist in a given track tend to melt away in the context of a full set".

== Awards ==
Writer Lynell George won the award for Best Album Notes at the 60th Annual Grammy Awards.
