= The Very Best of Otis Redding, Vol. 1 =

Greatest hits album by Otis Redding
- Released: November 10, 1992
- Genre: Soul
- Length: 44:25
- Label: Rhino

Professional ratings
Review scores
Source	Rating
AllMusic	5/5 stars

The Very Best of Otis Redding, Vol. 1 is an album by American soul singer-songwriter Otis Redding, released in 1992.

== Track listing ==
No.	Title	Writer(s)	Length
1.	"These Arms of Mine"	Otis Redding	2:34
2.	"Pain in my Heart"	Naomi Neville	2:26
3.	"That's How Strong My Love Is"	Roosevelt Jamison	2:25
4.	"Mr. Pitiful"	Otis Redding/Steve Cropper	2:44
5.	"I've Been Loving You Too Long"	Otis Redding/Jerry Butler	2:57
6.	"Respect"	Otis Redding	2:11
7.	"I Can't Turn You Loose"	Otis Redding	2:49
8.	"Satisfaction"	Mick Jagger/Keith Richards	2:47
9.	"My Lover's Prayer"	Otis Redding	3:12
10.	"Fa-Fa-Fa-Fa-Fa (Sad Song)"	Otis Redding/Steve Cropper	2:43
11.	"Try A Little Tenderness"	Jimmy Campbell/Reg Connelly/Harry Woods	3:20
12.	"Shake"	Sam Cooke	2:33
13.	"The Happy Song (Dum-Dum)"	Otis Redding/Steve Cropper	2:45
14.	"Tramp" (with Carla Thomas)	Lowell Fulson/Jimmy McCracklin	3:02
15.	"(Sittin' On) The Dock of the Bay"	Steve Cropper/Otis Redding	2:42
16.	"I've Got Dreams to Remember"	Zelma Redding/Otis Redding/Joe Rock	3:15

== Personnel ==
- Otis Redding – vocals

== Certifications ==
Region	Certification	Certified units/sales
United Kingdom (BPI)	Gold	100,000^{^}
United States (RIAA)	2× Platinum	2,000,000^{^}
^{^} Shipments figures based on certification alone.
