= Rufus and Carla =

Rufus and Carla was the moniker Stax Records used when releasing duets by Rufus Thomas and daughter Carla Thomas. They have the distinction of sharing the company's first hit "Cause I Love You" when Stax was briefly known as Satellite Records. Another hit was their version of "The Night Time Is the Right Time".

Carla Thomas was also part of a string of successful duets ("Tramp", "Knock On Wood", "Lovey Dovey", "New Year's Resolution") with the label's biggest star, Otis Redding. These were compiled on 1967's King & Queen album.

== Discography ==
- 1960 "Cause I Love You" b/w "Deep Down Inside" (Satellite Records S-102 pre Stax Records) (re-released as Carla and Rufus on Atco Records 45-6177)
- 1961 "I Didn't Believe" b/w "Yeah, Yea-ah" (released as Rufus and Friend on Atco 45-6199)
- 1964 "Cause That’s Really Some Good" b/w "Night Time Is the Right Time" (Stax S-151)
- 1965 "When You Move You Lose" b/w "We’re Tight" (Stax S-176)
- 1966 "Birds and Bees" b/w "Never Let You Go" (Stax S-184)

== See also ==
- Stax Records
- Rufus Thomas
- Carla Thomas
