= The Dock of the Bay – The Definitive Collection =

Compilation album by Otis Redding
- Released: 1987
- Genres: Memphis soul Deep soul Southern soul
- Length: 57:27
- Label: Atlantic

Otis Redding chronology
The Best of Otis Redding (1972)	The Dock of the Bay – The Definitive Collection (1987)	Otis! The Definitive Otis Redding (1993)

The Dock of the Bay – The Definitive Collection is a compilation album by Otis Redding, released in 1987.

== Track listing ==
No.	Title	Writer(s)	Length
1.	"Respect"	Otis Redding	2:09
2.	"Mr. Pitiful"	Otis Redding, Steve Cropper	2:40
3.	"Love Man"	Otis Redding	2:19
4.	"(I Can't Get No) Satisfaction"	Mick Jagger, Keith Richards	2:47
5.	"Security"	Otis Redding	2:35
6.	"I Can't Turn You Loose"	Otis Redding	2:39
7.	"Shake"	Sam Cooke	2:41
8.	"Hard to Handle"	Allen Jones, Al Bell, Otis Redding	2:20
9.	"Tramp" (with Carla Thomas)	Lowell Fulson, Jimmy McCracklin	2:57
10.	"Fa-Fa-Fa-Fa-Fa (Sad Song)"	Otis Redding, Steve Cropper	2:42
11.	"My Lover's Prayer"	Otis Redding	3:08
12.	"These Arms of Mine"	Otis Redding	2:34
13.	"That's How Strong My Love Is"	Roosevelt Jamison	2:28
14.	"Cigarettes and Coffee"	Eddie Thomas, Jerry Butler, Jay Walker	4:01
15.	"My Girl"	Smokey Robinson, Ronald White	2:57
16.	"A Change Is Gonna Come"	Sam Cooke	4:19
17.	"I've Been Loving You Too Long"	Otis Redding, Jerry Butler	3:15
18.	"Try a Little Tenderness"	"Irving King" (Jimmy Campbell and Reg Connelly) and Harry M. Woods	3:51
19.	"Pain in My Heart"	Naomi Neville	2:24
20.	"(Sittin' On) The Dock of the Bay"	Otis Redding, Steve Cropper	2:41

== Certifications ==
Region	Certification	Certified units/sales
Australia (ARIA)	Gold	35,000^{^}
Spain (Promusicae)	Gold	50,000^{^}
United Kingdom (BPI)	2× Platinum	600,000^{^}
^{^} Shipments figures based on certification alone.
