= Do the Twist (Connie Francis album) =

Do the Twist!/Dance Party
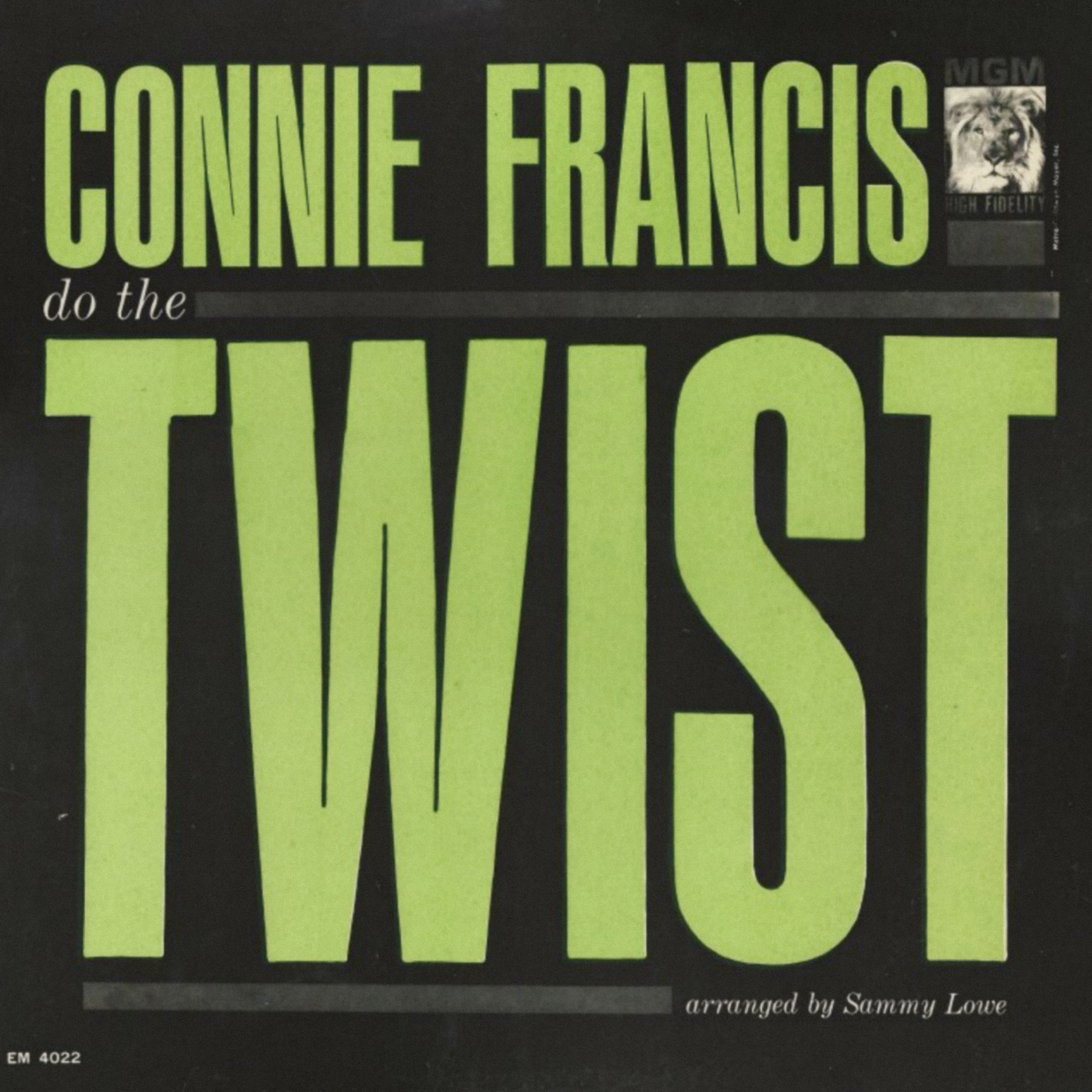

Studio album by Connie Francis
- Released: January 1962 (Do the Twist!)/ July 1962 (Dance Party)
- Recorded: November 20, 1961 – January 9, 1962
- Genre: Pop
- Labels: MGM Records; E-4022 (mono)/SE-4022 (stereo)
- Producer: Danny Davis

Connie Francis chronology
Connie Francis sings Irish Favorites (1962)	Do the Twist!/Dance Party (1962)	Connie Francis sings Fun Songs For Children (1962)

Do the Twist! is a studio album recorded in late 1961/early 1962 by U. S. entertainer Connie Francis. It was released in early 1962 on MGM Records. Later that same year it was repackackaged and re-released under a new title, Dance Party.

== The album ==
When the Twist became the biggest dance phenomenon of 1961, many artists recorded Twist-themed singles and albums, usually as a quickly produced rush releases as the audience's tastes in current dances changed very fast. Some of the follow-up dances to the Twist were the Mashed Potato or the Pony.

For her own Twist album, Francis recorded a total of seventeen songs, most of them written by Eddie Curtis who had also written Francis' 1959 recording You're Gonna Miss Me. Most of his works for this album were new songs, the exception being Mommy, You're Daughter's Fallin' in Love, which used the tune of Winfield Scott's Tweedlee Dee. Here, Curtis only provided new lyrics.

The sessions were arranged and conducted by Sammy Lowe and held on November 20, 1961 and on January 4, 8 and 9, 1962 in New York City.

The album was originally released in January 1962 shortly after the last recording session under the title Do The Twist!. It was released in both mono and stereo, both editions containing the song Does ol' Broadway ever sleep in versions with differently mixed street noises at the intro. It was shipped to record stores in a simple black cover with the title written on it in large neon green colored letters, very similar to Ray Charles' Do The Twist! album from 1961. The UK version of the album sported the letters in neon red.

In July 1962, the album was repackaged with a new cover design and was re-released under the new title Dance Party.

== Single releases, foreign language versions and unreleased songs ==
The album's opening track, Mr. Twister (not to be confused with the Chubby Checker song of the same name), was released in several territories outside the U. S. as a 45 rpm single. Francis herself recorded the song also in Italian, French, Japanese and Spanish. It is also one of only two songs Francis ever recorded in Swedish.

Kiss 'n' Twist (Kissin' Twist), with a tune based on the traditional Italian dance Tarantella and lyrics provided by Mike Canosa and Danny Stradella, was also released as a 45 rpm single in several territories. Additionally, Francis recorded a German rendering under the title Ein Boy für mich.

Drop It, Joe was released as the flipside to Francis' single Don't Break the Heart That Loves You in January 1962.

Telephone Lover was released in Greece as the flipside to Mr. Twister.

Don't Cry On My Shoulder was not released in the United States at all during the 1960s but was a single B-side in several European countries. A German recording under the title Alle meine Tränen was scheduled to be recorded at Austrophon Studios in Vienna on April 13, 1962 during the same session as Ein Boy für mich but this was abandoned due to delays in the busy recording schedule.

Gonna Git That Man was released in April 1962 as the flipside to Francis' single Second Hand Love (MGM Records K 13074, # 9) and later on the compilation Album Connie Francis sings "Second Hand Love" (MGM Records E-/SE-4049)

The remaining songs Love Bird, Cha Cha Twist, Lovey Dovey Twist (loosely based on Eddie Curtis's 1954 composition Lovey Dovey) and an alternate version of Mr. Twister wouldn't be released until 1996.

== Tracks ==
=== Album - Side A ===
#	Title	Songwriter	Length
1.	Mr. Twister	John Berry, Don Covay	2.23
2.	Teach Me How To Twist	Eddie Curtis	2.26
3.	Johnny Darlin'	Eddie Curtis	2.15
4.	Telephone Lover	Paul Vance, Lee Pockriss	2.38
5.	Mommy, Your Daughter's Fallin' In Love	Eddie Curtis, Winfield Scott	2.42
6.	Drop it, Joe	Eddie Curtis	2.49

=== Album - Side B ===
#	Title	Songwriter	Length	Remark
1.	Kiss 'n' Twist (Kissin' Twist)	Mike Canosa, Danny Stradella, traditional	2.01	
2.	I Won't Be Home To You	Eddie Curtis	2.27	
3.	My Real Happiness	Eddie Curtis	2.27	
4.	Ain't That Better, Baby	Cathy Lynn, Phil Medley	2.37	
5.	Hey, Ring-a-Ding	Eddie Curtis	2.36	
6.	Does Ol' Broadway Ever Sleep	Eddie Curtis	2.49 (stereo version); 2.51 (mono version)	Difference in length due to different street noises during the intro

=== Not included songs from the sessions ===
#	Title	Songwriter	Length	Remark
1.	Mr. Twister (alternate version)	John Berry, Don Covay	1.56	unreleased until 1996
2a.	Don't Cry On My Shoulder (complete version)	Bennie Benjamin, Sol Marcus	2.52	Released in Germany on MGM Records Single 61 059
2b.	Don't Cry On My Shoulder (edited version)	Bennie Benjamin, Sol Marcus	1.56	Released in the UK on MGM Records Single 45-MGM-1151
3a.	Gonna Git That Man (complete version)	Eddie Curtis	2.52	Released in the U. S. on MGM Records 12" Album SE-4049, Connie Francis sings "Second Hand Love" (stereo edition)
3b.	Gonna Git That Man (edited version)	Eddie Curtis	2.15	Released in the U. S. on MGM Records Single K 13074 and on MGM Records 12" Album E-4049, Connie Francis sings "Second Hand Love" (mono edition)
4.	Love Bird	Eddie Curtis	2.22	unreleased until 1996
5.	Cha Cha Twist	Don Christopher, Don Stirling, Larry Fresno	2.22	unreleased until 1996
6.	Lovey Dovey Twist	Eddie Curtis	2.22	unreleased until 1996

=== Foreign-language versions ===
#	Title	Songwriter	Length	Remark
1.	Mr. Twister (Spanish version)	John Berry, Don Covay, Mark Lewis, Matel	2.23	Released in Spain on MGM Records Extended Play HT 057-64
2.	Mr. Twister (Italian version)	John Berry, Don Covay, Mark Lewis, Cassia da Vinci	2.21	Released in Italy on MGM Records Single K-2039
3.	Mr. Twister (Japanese version)	John Berry, Don Covay, Mark Lewis, Kenji Sazanami	2.24	Released in Japan on MGM Records Single LL-2151
4.	Mr. Twister (Swedish version)	John Berry, Don Covay, Mark Lewis, D. Rybrant	2.21	Released in Sweden on MGM Records Extended Play EPD-122
5.	Monsieur Twister (Quand Il Twiste)	John Berry, Don Covay, Mark Lewis, Michel Emer	2.20	French version of Mr. Twister; Released in Canada on MGM Records Single 12348X
6.	Ein Boy für mich	traditional, Mike Canosa, Danny Stradella, Fini Busch	2.04	German version of Kiss 'n' Twist (Kissin' Twist); Released in Germany on MGM Records 12" Album 665 040 (stereo) and 65 040 (mono), Ihre großen Erfolge
