= Good to Me (disambiguation) =

Good to Me is a 2010 song by LeToya

Good to Me may also refer to:

- Good to Me: Live at the Whisky a Go Go, Vol. 2, a 1993 live album by Otis Redding
- "Good to Me", a song by Otis Redding from the album The Soul Album, 1966
- "Good to Me", a song by Mary Mary featuring Destiny's Child from the album Thankful, 2000
- "Good to Me", a song by Florida Georgia Line from the album Life Rolls On, 2021
