= Love Man =

Studio album by Otis Redding
- Released: June 20, 1969
- Recorded: 1967
- Genre: Memphis soul
- Length: 31:30
- Label: Atco
- Producer: Steve Cropper

Otis Redding chronology
In Person at the Whisky a Go Go (1968)	Love Man (1969)	Tell the Truth (1970)

Love Man is the third posthumous album by American soul recording artist Otis Redding. It was released on June 20, 1969, and featured songs Redding had recorded in 1967. The album was produced by Steve Cropper, and featured Booker T. and the M.G.'s.

The album was a part of a series of posthumous releases by Atco Records after Redding's mainstream reputation skyrocketed in the wake of his 1967 death. Love Man charted at number 46 on the Billboard 200 and number 8 on the R&B Albums.

== Songs ==
"Direct Me" has pop and gospel elements and a heavy tambourine-laden arrangement. On "I'm a Changed Man", Redding employed scat singing. The album's title track has a mid-tempo funk groove and lyrical references to the hippie culture that had begun to appreciate Redding at the time. The song charted at number 72 on the Billboard Hot 100 and number 17 on the R&B Singles. "A Lover's Question" peaked at number 48 and number 20, respectively, and "Free Me" reached number 30 on the R&B Singles chart. "Look At That Girl", written by Randall Stewart and Edward Morris, is the wrong title, still uncorrected on album reissues. The song with this title was a single for The Fiestas in 1962 (Stewart and Morris being band members). The song on "Love Man" is "Look At The Girl", written by Otis Redding, first issued as a single, later included as such in Otis! The Definitive Otis Redding.

== Critical reception ==
Professional ratings
Review scores
Source	Rating
Allmusic	3/5 stars
Entertainment Weekly	A−
Q	3/5 stars
Rolling Stone	(favorable)
The Rolling Stone Album Guide	4/5 stars
Encyclopedia of Popular Music	4/5 stars
The Village Voice	A

In a contemporary review, Robert Christgau of The Village Voice said that, although its "tender passages" are not on-par with Redding's best work, Love Man is his "best LP since Immortal." Ed Leimbacher of Rolling Stone magazine wrote that the album has "several of his very strongest performances on record" and praised the "loose imagination and tight style" of the M.G.'s backing group. Leimbacher hailed Redding as a "musical genius" and called "Direct Me" "one of the best Memphis soul cuts of all time".

In a review upon its 1992 reissue, Ira Robbins of Entertainment Weekly said that Love Man has "substantial songs soaked in instrumental spirit and topped off with Redding's emotion-packed vocals." Q magazine wrote that it "showcases Redding at his up-tempo frantic and frenetic best". By contrast, Allmusic's Mark Deming felt that the album is "flawed" because of material that is weaker than his previous albums, even though it has "Redding's indefatigable energy and conviction as a vocalist and the ever-indomitable groove of Steve Cropper, Al Jackson, Jr., and the other members of the Stax Records studio crew." Matthew Greenwald of Allmusic said that, apart from "(Sittin' On) The Dock of the Bay", the album's title track was "one of Otis Redding's finest and most commercial sides that he cut at the end of his brief career."

== Track listing ==
Side one
No.	Title	Writer(s)	Length
1.	"I'm A Changed Man"	Steve Cropper, Otis Redding, Louiella Cullipher	2:19
2.	"(Your Love Has Lifted Me) Higher and Higher"	Gary Jackson, Carl Smith	3:06
3.	"That's a Good Idea"	Otis Redding	2:19
4.	"I'll Let Nothing Separate Us"	Otis Redding	2:54
5.	"Direct Me"	Steve Cropper, Otis Redding	2:19
6.	"Love Man"	Otis Redding	2:19

Side two
No.	Title	Writer(s)	Length
7.	"Groovin' Time"	Otis Redding, Steve Cropper	2:49
8.	"Your Feeling is Mine"	Otis Redding	2:22
9.	"Got to Get Myself Together"	Otis Redding	2:28
10.	"Free Me"	Otis Redding, Gene Lawson	3:08
11.	"A Lover's Question"	Brook Benton, Jimmy Williams	2:55
12.	"Look at That Girl"	Randall Stewart, Edward Morris	2:37

== Personnel ==
Credits adapted from Allmusic.

- Otis Redding - vocals
- Booker T. Jones, Isaac Hayes - keyboards, organ, piano
- Steve Cropper - guitar, producer
- Donald Dunn - bass guitar
- Al Jackson Jr. - drums
- Wayne Jackson - trumpet
- Andrew Love, Joe Arnold - tenor saxophone

Reissue

- Ron Capone and Jim Stewart - engineer
- Paul C. Acree Jr. - cover photo
- Loring Eutemey - design
- Yves Beauvais - producer
- Steve Cropper - producer, remixing
- Tom Dowd - remixing
- Dan Hersch - remixing
- Bill Inglot - remixing

== Charts ==
=== Album ===
Chart (1969)	Peak position
US Billboard Hot R&B LPs	8
US Billboard Top LPs	46

=== Singles ===
Song	Chart	Peak position
"A Lover's Question"	US Billboard Hot Rhythm & Blues Singles	20
"A Lover's Question"	US Billboard Hot 100	48
"Love Man"	US Billboard Hot Rhythm & Blues Singles	17
"Love Man"	US Billboard Hot 100	72
"Love Man"	UK Singles Chart	43
"Free Me"	US Billboard Hot Rhythm & Blues Singles	30
"Free Me"	US Billboard Hot 100	103

== See also ==
- The Dock of the Bay (album)
