= Rachel Sweet =

American singer-songwriter

- Born: July 28, 1962 (age 64); Akron, Ohio, U.S.
- Education: Columbia University (BA)
- Occupations: Singer; actress; television writer; producer
- Known for: Everlasting Love; I Go to Pieces; B-A-B-Y
- Spouse: Tom Palmer (m. 1997)
- Children: 2
- Musical career
- Born: Akron, Ohio, U.S.
- Genres: Pop; country; rock
- Instrument: Vocals
- Years active: 1974–present
- Labels: Stiff, Columbia

Rachel Sweet (born July 28, 1962) is an American singer, television writer and actress.

== Early life and education ==
Rachel Sweet was born in Akron, Ohio. Because she pursued her singing career so young, she dropped out of high school to concentrate on her career, but she was still required to devote time to her studies.

Sweet resumed her education via correspondence courses, and she eventually graduated from Columbia University with a degree in French and English Literature in 1988.

== Singing career ==
Sweet began her singing career at age three when she won an electric garage door opener in a local talent contest after singing "I'm a Little Dutch Girl." She began recording commercials at the age of six, toured with Mickey Rooney, and performed in Las Vegas as the opening act for Bill Cosby at the age of 12. She began recording country music in 1974, but with little success beyond one minor hit.

Switching to rock and roll, she signed to Stiff Records and released her first album, Fool Around, in 1978, dropping out of high school to concentrate on her career, although she was still required to devote time to her studies. Sweet was backed by The Records on the Stiff Records tour in 1978. The album was a critical success, but sales were poor, although she did have some success with the single "B-A-B-Y" (a cover of the 1966 Carla Thomas song), which was a top-40 hit in the UK. The record label generated some controversy by pushing a Lolita-like image for her. Her follow-up album, Protect the Innocent, produced by Martin Rushent and Alan Winstanley, was largely ignored by the public and the music press, although it was popular with her fans and launched a well-received North American tour in 1980 with her band The Toys. She signed to Columbia Records in 1981, releasing the album ... And Then He Kissed Me and its hit single "Everlasting Love", a duet with Rex Smith. The album also includes "Shadows of the Night," later a hit for Pat Benatar.

Sweet released only one more album, 1982's Blame It on Love, which featured the song "Voo Doo". The video for the song was played on MTV, and she performed the song on the musical TV show Solid Gold. An album she recorded tracks for in 1982-83 remains unreleased.

She returned to music sporadically as she focused on her education, co-writing and recording the title song for John Waters' film Hairspray, and several songs for Waters' musical film Cry-Baby.

In 1992, Rhino Records released Fool Around: The Best of Rachel Sweet. The CD compilation includes all of her first album, Fool Around, as well as tracks from her other three albums and the theme from Hairspray.

== Film and television ==
In 1982, Sweet had a starring role in the low-budget musical film Rock 'n' Roll Hotel, which also featured Judd Nelson and was filmed in Richmond, Virginia, at the then-inoperative Jefferson Hotel. Shooting in Richmond with local extras began in October 1982 and was halted abruptly in December. The film's original 3D version, with scenes in the style of early MTV music videos, received only two screenings in 1983, in Los Angeles and New York. It was never released theatrically, even after it was eventually re-cut and completed in 1986 under the supervision of Sweet's father, Dick.

Sweet also appeared in the 1989 musical film Sing, performing "Life Ain't Worth Living (When You're Dead)". While the song does not appear on the soundtrack album, Columbia Records released it as the B-side of the soundtrack single "Romance (Love Theme from "Sing") by Paul Carrack and Terri Nunn.

In 1989 and 1990, Sweet hosted a show on The Comedy Channel (forerunner of Comedy Central) called The Sweet Life, which also featured Jon Stewart. Her recording of the theme song to the Nickelodeon series Clarissa Explains It All was a reworking of the theme song from The Sweet Life. She also provided vocals for songs in the Barbie animated series.

Sweet had a minor role as George Costanza's cousin in "The Contest", a 1992 episode of the TV sitcom Seinfeld. She played a waitress in the 1994 film comedy All Tied Up.

Focusing on a writing and producing career in television since the late 1990s, she has been a writer and/or executive producer on series including Dharma & Greg, Commando Nanny, George Lopez, Hot in Cleveland, 2 Broke Girls, The Single Guy and The Goldbergs.

== Personal life ==
Sweet owned Madonna's former home Los Pavoreales, selling it in 2010.

Sweet married television writer and producer Tom Palmer in 1997; they have two children.

== Discography ==
=== Albums ===
- Fool Around (1978), Stiff - US No. 97
- Protect the Innocent (1980), Stiff - US No. 123
- ... And Then He Kissed Me (1981), Columbia - US No. 124
- Blame It on Love (1982), Columbia
- Alive in America (2022), Renaissance Records (recorded 1980, with The Toys)

=== Compilation albums ===
- B.A.B.Y. - the Best of Rachel Sweet (1978), Stiff
- Fool Around: The Best of Rachel Sweet (1992), Rhino
- ...And Then He Kissed Me / Blame It On Love (2005), Sony
- Baby: Complete Stiff Recordings 1978 - 1980 (2014), RPM Records UK

=== Singles ===
- "Any Port in a Storm" (1976), Derrick
- "Paper Airplane" (1976), Derrick
- "The Ballad of Mable Ruth Miller and John Wesley Pritchett" (1976), Derrick
- "B-A-B-Y" (1978), Stiff - UK No. 35, AUS No. 47
- "Stranger in the House" (1978), Stiff-Columbia
- "Baby Let's Play House" (1979), Stiff
- "I Go to Pieces" (1979), Stiff - AUS No. 36
- "Tonight" (1980), Stiff
- "Spellbound" (1980), Stiff - US No. 107
- "Fool's Gold" (1980), Stiff
- "Lover's Lane" (1980), Stiff/Columbia
- "Everlasting Love" (with Rex Smith) (1981), Columbia - US No. 32, UK No. 35, AUS No. 41
- "Then He Kissed Me / Be My Baby" (1981), CBS - AUS No. 55
- "Shadows of the Night" (1981), CBS
- "Voo Doo" (1982), Columbia - US No. 72
- "Hairspray" (1988), MCA
