= Protect the Innocent (Rachel Sweet album) =

Studio album by Rachel Sweet
- Released: February 15, 1980
- Studios: Morgan (London); Rushent's Mansion (Streatley); T.W. (London)
- Genre: New wave
- Length: 36:13
- Labels: Stiff; Columbia
- Producers: Martin Rushent; Alan Winstanley

Rachel Sweet chronology
Fool Around (1978)	Protect the Innocent (1980)	...And Then He Kissed Me (1981)

Singles from Protect the Innocent
- 1. "Baby, Let's Play House" Released: November 1979; 2. "Fool's Gold" Released: February 1980; 3. "Lovers' Lane" Released: 1980; 4. "Spellbound" Released: 1980

Protect the Innocent is the second album by American singer Rachel Sweet. It was released on February 15, 1980, and was issued by Stiff Records and Columbia Records. The album was produced by Martin Rushent and Alan Winstanley, with the latter also handling engineering.

== Critical reception ==
Professional ratings
Review scores
Source	Rating
AllMusic	3/5 stars
Christgau's Record Guide	C+
Record Mirror	2/5 stars
Smash Hits	7/10

In a 1980 review, Billboard noted the "good production and musicianship" on Protect the Innocent and found that the album shows that Sweet "has possibilities beyond the new wave audience." Critic Robert Christgau likened her to "a new-wave Linda Ronstadt" and was less receptive, citing Sweet's self-penned "Tonight Ricky" as the album's only interesting song.

== Track listing ==
Side one
No.	Title	Writer(s)	Length
1.	"Tonight"	Rachel Sweet; Graham Edwards	3:10
2.	"Jealous"	Jo Allen	2:45
3.	"I've Got a Reason"	Moon Martin	2:53
4.	"New Age"	Lou Reed	4:14
5.	"Baby, Let's Play House"	Arthur Gunter	1:59
6.	"New Rose"	Brian James	2:14
Total length:			17:15

Side two
No.	Title	Writer(s)	Length
1.	"Fool's Gold"	Graham Parker	3:02
2.	"Take Good Care of Me"	Sweet; Steve Everitt	2:46
3.	"Spellbound"	Jimme O'Neill	3:20
4.	"Lovers' Lane"	Sweet	3:33
5.	"Foul Play"	Gary Sulsh; Stuart Leathwood	2:59
6.	"Tonight Ricky"	Sweet	3:18
Total length:			18:58

== Charts ==
Chart (1980)	Peak position
Australian Albums (Kent Music Report)	91
Canada Top Albums/CDs (RPM)	77
US Billboard 200	123
