= Knock on Wood (Eddie Floyd song) =

1966 single by Eddie Floyd

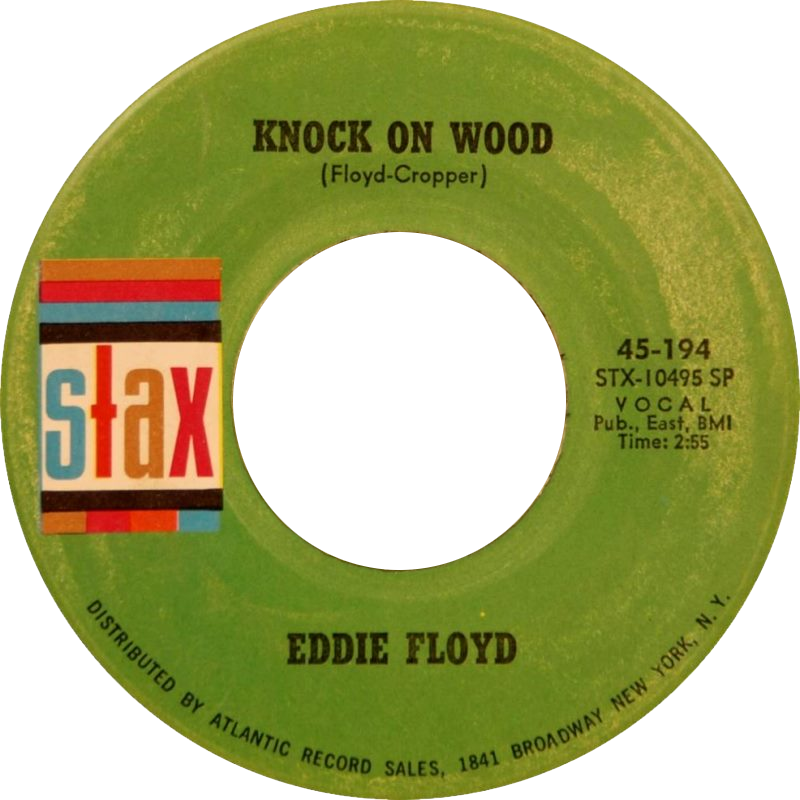
- US single release of the original Eddie Floyd recording

Single by Eddie Floyd

from the album Knock on Wood
- B-side: "Got to Make a Comeback"
- Released: July 25, 1966
- Recorded: July 13, 1966
- Studio: Stax, Memphis
- Genre: Southern R&B; soul; funk
- Length: 3:06
- Label: Stax
- Songwriters: Eddie Floyd; Steve Cropper
- Producer: Jim Stewart

Eddie Floyd singles chronology
"Things Get Better" (1966)	"Knock on Wood" (1966)	"Raise Your Hand" (1967)

Audio
- "Knock on Wood" by Eddie Floyd on YouTube

"Knock on Wood" is a song by Eddie Floyd and Steve Cropper released as a single by Floyd in 1966. The song was later covered by other artists, most notably Amii Stewart in 1979. Stewart's disco version was the most successful on weekly music charts.

== Eddie Floyd version ==
"Knock On Wood" was written in the Lorraine Motel in Memphis, Tennessee (now The National Civil Rights Museum). Steve Cropper has stated in interviews that there was a lightning storm the night that he and Eddie wrote the song, hence the lyrics 'It's like thunder, lightning, The way you love me is frightening'. The song was based on another song co-written by Cropper, the Wilson Pickett version of "In the Midnight Hour" (1965), having the same chord progression "only played in reverse".

According to Floyd, "Knock On Wood" was initially written for Otis Redding. However, Stax label manager Jim Stewart turned down the idea of Redding recording the song. Both sides of the single were recorded on July 13, 1966 at Stax Records house studio in Memphis, Tennessee, with Stax's house band Booker T. & the M.G.'s (Cropper on guitar, Donald "Duck" Dunn on bass, Al Jackson Jr. on drums, Booker T. Jones on keyboards), Isaac Hayes on piano and Wayne Jackson on trumpet. Stewart produced the session.

"Knock on Wood" was released as a single by Stax on July 25, 1966, featuring "Got to Make a Comeback" on the B-side. His recording peaked at number 28 on the Billboard Hot 100 and spent one week at number 1 on the Soul Singles chart. Floyd's version earned a Gold certification from the Recording Industry Association of America (RIAA) on July 17, 1995. The song became the title track for Floyd's debut album, released on January 26, 1967.

=== Charts ===
Chart (1966)	Peak position
Canada Top Singles (RPM)	67
UK Singles (Official Charts)	19
US Billboard Hot 100	28
US Hot Rhythm & Blues Singles (Billboard)	1

== Otis Redding and Carla Thomas version ==
"Knock on Wood"

Single by Otis Redding and Carla Thomas

from the album King & Queen
- B-side: "Let Me Be Good To You"
- Released: September 1967
- Genre: Soul
- Length: 2:48
- Label: Stax 601021
- Songwriters: Eddie Floyd; Steve Cropper

Otis Redding and Carla Thomas singles chronology
"Tramp" (1967)	"Knock on Wood" (1967)	"Sittin' on the Dock of the Bay" (1968)

Carla Thomas singles chronology
"Tramp" (1967)	"Knock on Wood" (1968)	"Lovey Dovey" (1968)

=== Charts ===
Chart (1967)	Peak position
Canada Top Singles (RPM)	29
UK Singles (Official Charts)	35
UK R&B (Record Mirror)	8
US Billboard Hot 100	30
US Hot Rhythm & Blues Singles (Billboard)	8

== David Bowie version ==
"Knock on Wood"
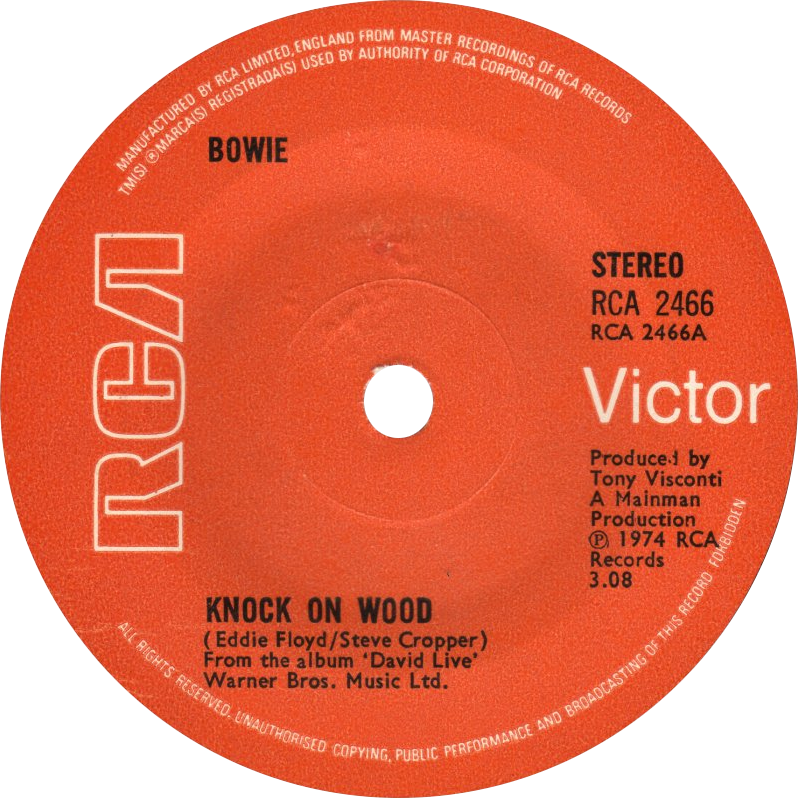
- 1974 UK vinyl single of the David Bowie recording

Single by David Bowie

from the album David Live
- B-side: "Panic in Detroit"
- Released: 13 September 1974
- Genre: Blues rock
- Length: 3:08
- Label: RCA
- Songwriters: Eddie Floyd; Steve Cropper

David Bowie singles chronology
"1984" (1974)	"Knock on Wood" (1974)	"Rock 'n' Roll with Me" (1974)

Audio
- "Knock on Wood" (from David Live) on YouTube
- "Knock on Wood" (live in Nashville, November 30, 1974) on YouTube

David Bowie's live performance of the song was released as a single in several countries in 1974. The single, taken from Bowie's live album David Live, reached the top ten in the UK. The B-side, "Panic in Detroit", was not included on that album, but was from the same concert. It was added to the 2005 release of the album.

1. "Knock on Wood" (Eddie Floyd, Steve Cropper) – 3:03
2. "Panic in Detroit" (Bowie) – 5:52

=== Charts ===
Chart performance for "Knock on Wood" by David Bowie
Chart (1974–2014)	Peak position
Finland (Suomen virallinen lista)	19
France (SNEP)	143
Ireland (IRMA)	4
Norway (VG-lista)	10
UK Singles (OCC)	10

== Amii Stewart version ==
"Knock on Wood"
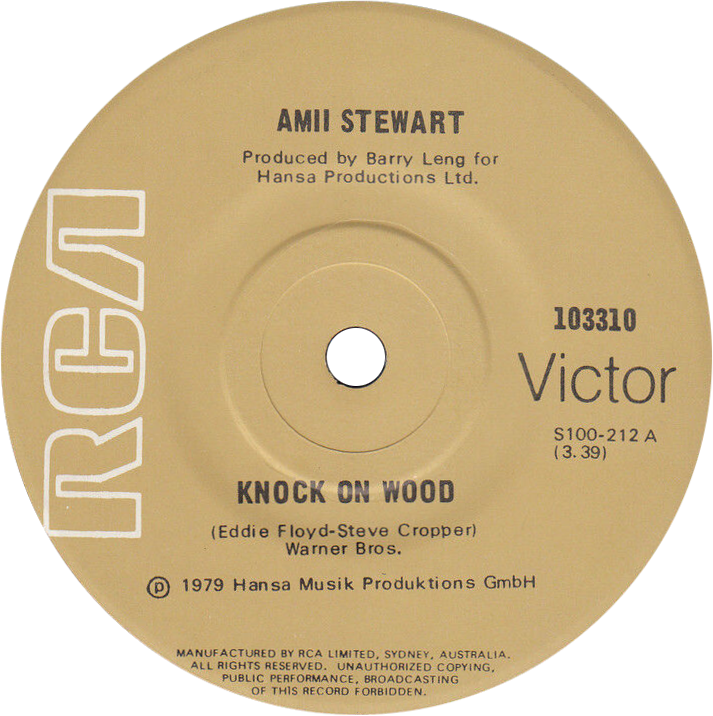
- 1979 Australian single of the Amii Stewart recording

Single by Amii Stewart

from the album Knock on Wood
- B-side: "When You Are Beautiful"
- Released: November 10, 1978 (UK) / January 15, 1979 (US)
- Recorded: 1978
- Genre: Disco; synth-rock; hi-NRG
- Length: 6:11 (album version); 3:53 (single version)
- Label: Atlantic, Hansa (UK); Ariola (US)
- Songwriters: Eddie Floyd; Steve Cropper
- Producer: Barry Leng

Amii Stewart singles chronology
"You Really Touched My Heart" (1977)	"Knock on Wood" (1978)	"Light My Fire" (1979)

Music video
- "Knock on Wood" (single version) on YouTube

Audio
- "Knock on Wood" (long disco version) on YouTube
- "Knock on Wood" (German album edit) on YouTube
- "Knock on Wood" (1985 remix, 7" edit) on YouTube

American disco and soul singer Amii Stewart released a disco version of "Knock on Wood" in 1978. It reached number one on the US charts in April 1979; it also made it to the soul singles and disco charts, becoming the best-known version of the song. This recording was co-produced by Simon May. It reached the top 10 twice in the UK, first in 1979 (peaking at number 6) and again in a remixed version in 1985 (peaking at number 7).

The song earned a gold certification on March 22, 1979, and then a platinum certification on August 1 the same year from the RIAA when the single sold one or two million units. It would become one of the "anthems for the gay community". Stewart's rendition of the song earned her a Grammy Award nomination for Best Female R&B Vocal Performance at the 22nd Annual Grammy Awards in 1980. It was featured prominently in the video game The Warriors, as well as the trailers for the Walt Disney Pictures 1997 live-action film Mr. Magoo, starring Leslie Nielsen, and the 1998 film The Big Lebowski.

=== Charts ===
==== Weekly charts ====
Chart (1979)	Peak position
Australia (Kent Music Report)	2
Austria (Ö3 Austria Top 40)	6
Belgium (Ultratop 50 Flanders)	20
Canadian Top Singles (RPM)	1
Canada Adult Contemporary (RPM)	1
Canada Disco Singles (RPM)	1
Finland (Suomen virallinen lista)	15
France (SNEP)	2
Ireland (IRMA)	15
Italy (Musica e dischi)	1
Netherlands (Dutch Top 40)	7
Netherlands (Single Top 100)	10
New Zealand (Recorded Music NZ)	3
South Africa (Springbok Radio)	9
Sweden (Sverigetopplistan)	5
Switzerland (Schweizer Hitparade)	2
UK Singles (OCC)	6
US Billboard Hot 100	1
US Hot Disco Singles (Billboard)	5
US Hot Soul Singles (Billboard)	6
US Cash Box Top 100	1
West Germany (GfK)	13

Chart (1985) "Knock on Wood/Light My Fire" (Remix)	Peak position
Belgium (Ultratop)	32
Ireland (IRMA)	6
UK Singles (OCC)	7
Chart (1999) "Knock on Wood '99"	Peak position
Europe (Eurochart Hot 100)	92
France (SNEP)	73

==== Year-end charts ====
Chart (1979)	Position
Australia (Kent Music Report)	9
Austria (Ö3 Austria Top 40)	25
Canada Top Singles (RPM)	5
Netherlands (Dutch Top 40)	69
New Zealand (Recorded Music NZ)	12
UK Singles (OCC)	38
US Billboard Hot 100	22
West Germany (Official German Charts)	31

=== Certifications ===
Region	Certification	Certified units/sales
Canada (Music Canada)	Platinum	150,000^{^}
United Kingdom (BPI)	Silver	250,000^{^}
United States (RIAA)	Platinum	2,000,000^{^}
^{^} Shipments figures based on certification alone.

== Other cover versions ==
External media

Audio
- "Knock on Wood" (live, 1968) by Buddy Guy on YouTube
- "Knock on Wood" by Cher on YouTube
- "Knock on Wood" (live in New Orleans, 1991) by Toots and the Maytals on YouTube
- "Knock on Wood" by Michael Bolton on YouTube
- "Knock on Wood" (radio edit) by Mary Griffin on YouTube
- "Knock on Wood" (Love to Infinity extended vocal mix) by Mary Griffin on YouTube
- "Knock on Wood" (Now mix) by Mary Griffin on YouTube

Video
- "Knock on Wood" by Mary Griffin (from the film 54, 1998) on YouTube

Buddy Guy performed the song numerous times, one of which is included in his live 1968 album This Is Buddy Guy! At the ninety-minute Bradley Center concert in January 31, 1992, he performed the song for fifteen minutes as the concert's finale. At a February 1992 concert in the Students' Union Building of the University of Alberta, he also performed the song with a wireless transmitter among the audience for twenty minutes. One of band members at the University concert was bassist Greg Rzab. Guy's another song performance at the Blues Music Festival '92 (August 28, 1992) lasted ten minutes while he walked around the audience in the Marcus Amphitheater (Milwaukee).

Cher recorded her version for her 1976 album I'd Rather Believe in You. Boston Globe critic Christopher Muther in 2019 ranked this version number 16 out of his 25 favorite cover songs by Cher, calling it "a shockingly good disco-funk interpretation".

Razzy Bailey's version (1984) peaked at number 29 on the Billboard Hot Country Songs chart on the week ending September 29, 1984, the version's ninth week. Toots Hibbert's reggae version, recorded for his album Toots in Memphis (1988), debuted and peaked at number 43 on the New Zealand Singles Chart on the week ending April 9, 1988.

The Blues Brothers performed the song live in Montreux in 1990 and at a faster pace than Floyd's original recording; the performance was recorded into the band's 1990 live album. Among the band members at the concert were Eddie Floyd (as the lead singer) and Steve Cropper—both the song's writers—and bassist Donald "Duck" Dunn.

Michael Bolton covered it for his 1992 album Timeless: The Classics. The Milwaukee Sentinel music critic Dave Tianen wrote that, in Timeless, Bolton's renditions of classic songs, like this song, are "almost identical to the original" and called them "more an impression than an interpretation." Tianen further wrote, "Classic performances by definition aren't easily surpassed."

A singer Mary Griffin recorded her disco/dance version for the 1998 film 54; Griffin's recording was released that same year as a promotional single. The Billboard magazine noted in 1998 that Stewart's version is "tough" to render, but it praised Griffin's "vocal prowess, attitude, and range of a true ingenuine" in spirit of Stewart's version, especially in the "movie mix" track of the promo-only release.
