= Blame It on Love (album) =

Studio album by Rachel Sweet
- Released: 1982
- Genre: Rock
- Label: Columbia
- Producer: Rachel Sweet

Rachel Sweet chronology
... And Then He Kissed Me (1981)	Blame It on Love (1982)	Fool Around: The Best of Rachel Sweet (1992)

Blame It on Love is the fourth album by the American musician Rachel Sweet, released in 1982. She supported it with a European tour. "Voo Doo" peaked at No. 72 on the Billboard Hot 100. Sweet decided in 1983 to retire from making albums, in part because she wanted to attend college.

== Production ==
The album was produced by Sweet. She wrote or cowrote all of its songs, most of which are about romance and relationships. Sweet was aided by Marc Blatte and Larry Gottlieb. Andy Newmark played drums during the recording sessions.

== Critical reception ==
Professional ratings
Review scores
Source	Rating
All Music Guide to Rock	2/5 stars
The Encyclopedia of Popular Music	3/5 stars
MusicHound Rock: The Essential Album Guide	3/5 stars
The Philadelphia Inquirer	3/5 stars

The Globe and Mail opined that "there's something depressing about seeing Sweet, at 20, going the AOR Pat Benatar route". The Corpus Christi Times likewise dismissed Sweet as "Benatar, junior division". The Blade-Tribune said that Sweet's "strong in the blues rock now, adding a definite mellowing factor to her once sizzling rock and roll." The Daily Record admired Sweet's work ethic but suggested that "it may have prematurely exhausted her resources."

The New York Daily News noted that Sweet "is futilely attempting to 'meld' her '70s sassy, high-voiced teenybop rock 'n' roll style with the Motown soul technique". The Philadelphia Inquirer stated that "there are several excellent songs—rockers and ballads". The Edmonton Journal called Sweet "pouty and antagonistic, a siren with a touch of country twang." The Detroit Free Press labeled the album "mindless pop rock fun".

== Track listing ==
Side 1

1. "Voo Doo"
2. "Paralyzed"
3. "Stick and Stones"
4. "American Girl"
5. "The Heart Is a Lonely Hunter"

Side 2

1. "Blame It on Love"
2. "Hearts on the Line"
3. "Cruisin' Love"
4. "Cool Heart"
5. "Baby Blue"
