= In Person at the Whisky a Go Go =

Live album by Otis Redding
- Released: October 1, 1968
- Recorded: April 8–10, 1966
- Venue: Whisky a Go Go, Los Angeles
- Genre: Soul
- Length: 34:50
- Label: Atco
- Producer: Nesuhi Ertegun

Otis Redding chronology
The Immortal Otis Redding (1968)	In Person at the Whisky a Go Go (1968)	Love Man (1969)

Professional ratings
Review scores
Source	Rating
Allmusic	5/5 stars
Rolling Stone	(positive)
Uncut	8/10 stars

In Person at the Whisky a Go Go is a live album by Otis Redding, recorded at the Whisky a Go Go on Sunset Strip in Los Angeles, California in April 1966. It was released posthumously in 1968. The recording was made before Otis Redding attained crossover fame at the Monterey Pop Festival.

The original issue of the album presented a selection of songs from the three shows. Another selection was released in 1993 under the title Good to Me: Live at the Whisky a Go Go, Vol. 2. The full set of performances were released as Live at the Whisky a Go Go: The Complete Recordings on October 21, 2016.

== Track listing ==
Side one
No.	Title	Writer(s)	Length
1.	"I Can't Turn You Loose"	Otis Redding	4:45
2.	"Pain in My Heart"	Naomi Neville	2:13
3.	"Just One More Day"	Steve Cropper, Redding, McElvoy Robinson	5:25
4.	"Mr. Pitiful"	Cropper, Redding	2:07
5.	"(I Can't Get No) Satisfaction"	Mick Jagger, Keith Richards	4:37

Side two
No.	Title	Writer(s)	Length
6.	"I'm Depending On You"	Redding	3:02
7.	"Any Ole Way"	Cropper, Redding	2:24
8.	"These Arms of Mine"	Redding	4:01
9.	"Papa's Got a Brand New Bag"	James Brown	4:45
10.	"Respect"	Redding	2:05

== Personnel ==
- Otis Redding – vocals
- Katie Webster - keyboards, piano
- James Young – guitar
- Ralph Stewart – bass guitar
- Elbert Woodson – drums
- Sammy Coleman, John Farris – trumpet
- Clarence Johnson – trombone
- Robert Holloway, Donald Henry, Robert Pittman – tenor saxophone
- Stanislaw Zagórski album design

== Charts ==
=== Album ===
Chart	Peak position
US Billboard Hot R&B LPs	7
US Billboard Top LPs	82

=== Singles ===
Song	Chart	Peak position
"Papa's Got a Brand New Bag"	US Billboard Hot Rhythm & Blues Singles	10
"Papa's Got a Brand New Bag"	US Billboard Hot 100	21
