= Fool Around =

Studio album by Rachel Sweet
- Released: October 13, 1978
- Genres: New wave; country; pop; R&B
- Length: 35:05
- Labels: Stiff; Columbia
- Producer: Liam Sternberg

Rachel Sweet chronology
Fool Around (1978)	Protect the Innocent (1980)

Singles from Fool Around
- 1. "B-A-B-Y" Released: November 1978; 2. "I Go to Pieces" Released: March 1979

Alternative cover
- US edition

Professional ratings
Review scores
Source	Rating
AllMusic	4.5/5 stars
Christgau's Record Guide	B+

Fool Around is the debut album by American singer Rachel Sweet. It was first released in the United Kingdom on October 13, 1978 by Stiff Records. The album was released in the United States in July 1979, by Stiff and Columbia Records, with a revised track listing.

== Track listing ==
All tracks are written by Liam Sternberg, except where noted.

=== UK edition ===
Side one

1. "Just My Style" – 3:15
2. "B-A-B-Y" (Isaac Hayes, David Porter) – 3:08
3. "Who Does Lisa Like?" – 2:58
4. "Wildwood Saloon" – 3:58
5. "Stay Awhile" (Mike Hawker, Ivor Raymonde) – 3:03
6. "Suspended Animation" – 3:19

Side two

1. "It's So Different Here" – 2:48
2. "Cuckoo Clock" – 2:46
3. "Pin a Medal on Mary" (Will Birch, John Wicks) – 3:08
4. "Girl with a Synthesizer" – 2:36
5. "Stranger in the House" (Elvis Costello) – 4:06

=== US edition ===
Side one

1. "B-A-B-Y" (Hayes, Porter) – 3:08
2. "I Go to Pieces" (Del Shannon) – 2:43
3. "Who Does Lisa Like?" – 2:58
4. "Wildwood Saloon" – 3:58
5. "Stay Awhile" (Hawker, Raymonde) – 3:03
6. "Suspended Animation" – 3:19

Side two

1. "Sad Song" (Mark Middler, Peter Mason) – 2:53
2. "It's So Different Here" – 2:48
3. "Cuckoo Clock" – 2:46
4. "Pin a Medal on Mary" (Birch, Wicks) – 3:08
5. "Stranger in the House" (Costello) – 4:06

== Personnel ==
Credits are adapted from the album's liner notes.

Musicians

- Rachel Sweet – lead vocals, backing vocals
- Ray Beavis – tenor saxophone
- Charley Charles – drums on "B-A-B-Y", "Stay Awhile", "Pin a Medal on Mary" and "Stranger in the House"
- Simon Climie – finger snapping, hand clapping, percussion
- John "Irish" Earle – baritone saxophone
- Mickey Gallagher – piano on "B-A-B-Y", "Stay Awhile", "Pin a Medal on Mary" and "Stranger in the House"
- Paul Gillieron – soprano saxophone, penny whistle
- Chris Gower – trombone
- Dick Hanson – trumpet
- Lene Lovich – backing vocals on "Just My Style" and "Cuckoo Clock"
- Brinsley Schwarz – rhythm guitar on "B-A-B-Y" and "Stranger in the House"
- Liam Sternberg (credited as "Pietro Nardini") – bass guitar, guitar, keyboards
- Stiff Chorus – vocals on "Girl with a Synthesizer"
- Mark Sugden – drums, percussion
- Leah Sweet – finger snapping, hand clapping, percussion
- Norman Watt-Roy – bass guitar on "B-A-B-Y", "Stay Awhile", "Pin a Medal on Mary" and "Stranger in the House"

Production

- Roger Béchirian – mixing, recording
- Guy Bidmead – mixing, recording
- Barrie Guard – mixing and production on "I Go to Pieces" and "Sad Song"
- David Mackay – production on "I Go to Pieces" and "Sad Song"
- Bob Painter – recording
- Peter Solley – remixing on US edition
- Liam Sternberg – production

== Charts ==
Chart (1979)	Peak position
Australian Albums (Kent Music Report)	86
Canada Top Albums/CDs (RPM)	77
US Billboard 200	97
