= Tell the Truth (Otis Redding album) =

Studio album by Otis Redding
- Released: July 1, 1970
- Recorded: 1967
- Genre: Memphis soul
- Length: 31:01
- Label: Atco
- Producer: Steve Cropper

Otis Redding chronology
Love Man (1969)	Tell the Truth (1970)	Historic Performances (1970)

Professional ratings
Review scores
Source	Rating
AllMusic	3/5 stars
Christgau's Record Guide	B+
Rolling Stone	(not rated)

Tell the Truth is the fourth posthumous studio album by Otis Redding (his tenth studio album overall), featuring songs recorded in 1967.

== Track listing ==
All tracks are written by Otis Redding; except where indicated.

Side one
No.	Title	Writer(s)	Length
1.	"Demonstration"	Otis Redding, Don Covay	2:25
2.	"Tell the Truth"	Lowman Pauling	3:11
3.	"Out of Sight"	James Brown	2:18
4.	"Give Away None of My Love"		2:54
5.	"Wholesale Love"		2:29
6.	"I Got the Will"		2:51

Side two
No.	Title	Writer(s)	Length
7.	"Johnny's Heartbreak"	Otis Redding, Arthur Alexander	2:29
8.	"Snatch a Little Piece"		2:13
9.	"Slippin' and Slidin'"	Richard Penniman, Al Collins, Edwin Bocage, James Smith	1:57
10.	"The Match Game"	Otis Redding, David Porter	2:55
11.	"A Little Time"		2:33
12.	"Swingin' on a String"		2:52

== Personnel ==
- Otis Redding – vocals
- Booker T. Jones, Isaac Hayes – keyboards, organ, piano
- Steve Cropper – guitar, producer, liner notes
- Donald Dunn – bass guitar
- Al Jackson Jr. – drums
- Wayne Jackson – trumpet
- Andrew Love, Joe Arnold – tenor saxophone
- Jim Stewart – engineer
- Jimmy Douglass – remixer
- Jean-Pierre Leloir – photography
- Loring Eutemey – cover design

== Charts ==
Chart (1970)	Peak position
US Billboard 200	200
US Top R&B/Hip-Hop Albums (Billboard)	26
