= King & Queen =

Studio album by Otis Redding and Carla Thomas
- Released: March 16, 1967
- Recorded: January 18–24, 1967
- Genre: Soul
- Length: 32:53
- Labels: Stax/Atlantic; S716
- Producer: Jim Stewart

Otis Redding chronology
Complete & Unbelievable: The Otis Redding Dictionary of Soul (1966)	King & Queen (1967)	Live in Europe (1967)

Carla Thomas chronology
The Queen Alone (1967)	King & Queen (1967)	Memphis Queen (1969)

King & Queen is a studio album by the American recording artists Otis Redding and Carla Thomas. It is Thomas' fourth album and Redding's sixth and the final studio album before his death on December 10, 1967. Influenced by Marvin Gaye's duets, the album features ten covers of soul classics and the eleventh finishing song co-written by Redding.

The album includes crossover hits "Tramp" and "Knock on Wood". Following Redding's death, the single "Lovey Dovey" was also released. The original album's liner notes were written by Tennessee Senator Howard H. Baker, Jr. It was released on March 16, 1967, by Stax Records.

== Background and recording ==
Producer Jim Stewart had the idea to produce a duet album with Otis Redding and Carla Thomas, as he thought it would help their musical careers' progress, and that "[Redding's] rawness and [Thomas's] sophistication would work" well together. Another reason to combine the two artists was in the hopes of achieving a success similar to that which Motown singer Marvin Gaye had with both Mary Wells and Kim Weston. Carla Thomas was already successful in the R&B business; she had already had many singles appear in both the Hot 100 and Hot Rhythm & Blues Singles charts, most recently her 1966 song "B-A-B-Y". Redding agreed to record with Thomas, simply stating, "Well, hey, you from Memphis, you from Tennessee, you can hang". At the time the album was recorded in January 1967, Thomas was studying at Howard University in Washington D.C. for an M.A. in English. Recorded in about six days (another source states only three days), the album features eleven songs: ten covers of soul classics, and an eleventh song, "Ooh Carla, Ooh Otis", that Redding co-wrote with Al Bell. It features house band Booker T. & the M.G.'s, pianist Isaac Hayes, and the brass section the Memphis Horns. Six out of eleven songs were cut during their session; the rest were overdubbed by Redding in the following days owing to their concert obligations.

== Release ==
Three singles were released from the album: "Tramp", the first cut song, was released as a single in April and peaked at number two on Billboard Hot Rhythm & Blues Singles chart and at number twenty-six on Billboard Hot 100; "Knock on Wood" peaked in September at number eight on the Hot Rhythm & Blues Singles chart and number thirty on the Hot 100 charts; and "Lovey Dovey" was released late in 1968, and charted at number twenty-one on the Hot Rhythm & Blues Singles list and number sixty on the Hot 100. The album was released on March 16, 1967.

== Retrospective reviews ==
Professional ratings
Review scores
Source	Rating
Allmusic	4.5/5 stars
Encyclopedia of Popular Music	4/5 stars
Record Mirror	4/5 stars
The Village Voice	A−

In retrospective reviews King & Queen has gained positive comments. Jason Ankeny of Allmusic gives the album 4.5 stars out of 5. He states that "Redding and Thomas enjoy an undeniable chemistry, and they play off each other wonderfully", and summarizes the album as follows: "Otis Redding never recorded a lighter, more purely entertaining record than King & Queen". Robert Christgau gives it an "A−"; although he says the album was "pretty ephemeral", he praises the music, and writes that it sounds "vivacious, catchier and funnier [than] most soul music".

== Track listing ==
Side one
No.	Title	Writer(s)	Length
1.	"Knock on Wood"	Steve Cropper, Eddie Floyd	2:48
2.	"Let Me Be Good to You"	Isaac Hayes, David Porter, Carl Wells	2:48
3.	"Tramp"	Lowell Fulson, Jimmy McCracklin	3:00
4.	"Tell It Like It Is"	George Davis, Lee Diamond	3:13
5.	"When Something Is Wrong with My Baby"	Hayes, Porter	3:14
6.	"Lovey Dovey"	Ahmet Ertegun, Eddie "Memphis" Curtis	2:33

Side two
No.	Title	Writer(s)	Length
7.	"New Year's Resolution"	Randle Catron, Willie Dean "Deanie" Parker, Mary Frierson	3:14
8.	"It Takes Two"	Sylvia Moy, William "Mickey" Stevenson	3:03
9.	"Are You Lonely for Me, Baby?"	Bert Berns	3:14
10.	"Bring It On Home to Me"	Sam Cooke	3:14
11.	"Ooh Carla, Ooh Otis"	Alvertis Isbell, Otis Redding	2:32

== Personnel ==
- Otis Redding – vocals
- Carla Thomas – vocals
- Booker T. Jones – keyboards, piano
- Isaac Hayes – keyboards, piano
- Steve Cropper – guitar
- Donald Dunn – bass guitar
- Al Jackson Jr. – drums
- Wayne Jackson – trumpet
- Andrew Love – tenor saxophone
- Joe Arnold – alto saxophone
- Yves Beauvais – reissue producer
- Dan Hersch – remastering
- Bill Inglot – remastering
- Jim Stewart – producer
- Ronnie Stoots – cover design

== Charts ==
=== Album ===
Chart (1968)	Peak position
UK Albums (Official Charts)	18
UK R&B Albums (Record Mirror)	1
US Billboard 200	36
US Top R&B/Hip-Hop Albums (Billboard)	5

=== Singles ===
Song	Chart	Peak position
"Tramp"	US Billboard Hot Rhythm & Blues Singles chart	2
"Tramp"	US Billboard Hot 100 chart	26
"Knock on Wood"	US Billboard Hot Rhythm & Blues Singles chart	8
"Knock on Wood"	US Billboard Hot 100 chart	30
"Lovey Dovey"	US Billboard Hot Rhythm & Blues Singles chart	21
"Lovey Dovey"	US Billboard Hot 100 chart	60

- Source: Allmusic
