= B-A-B-Y =

- Side A of the US single

Single by Carla Thomas

from the album Carla
- B-side: "What Have You Got to Offer Me"
- Released: July 18, 1966 (US); October 7, 1966 (UK)
- Recorded: 1966
- Genre: R&B; pop
- Length: 2:49
- Label: Stax; Atlantic
- Songwriters: Isaac Hayes; David Porter

Carla Thomas singles chronology
"Let Me Be Good to You" (1966)	"B-A-B-Y" (1966)	"All I Want for Christmas Is You" (1966)

Music video
- "B-A-B-Y" on YouTube

"B-A-B-Y" is a 1966 song written by Isaac Hayes and David Porter. The song was first recorded in 1966 by Carla Thomas. Her version was released as the opening track of her album Carla, and as a single by Stax Records.

== Chart performance ==
In the US, the single reached no. 14 on the US pop chart, no. 3 on the R&B chart, and no. 10 in Canada.

== Cover versions ==
- The song was recorded in the UK in 1967 by The Ferris Wheel, featuring singer Diane Ferraz and released on their album Can't Break the Habit.
- The song was recorded in 1969 by the chilean band Aguaturbia on their self-titled debut album.
- It was also recorded in 1977 by American singer Rachel Sweet for her album Fool Around, whose version on the Stiff label reached no. 35 on the UK singles chart.

== Popular culture ==
The song was featured in the 2017 film Baby Driver and was included on its soundtrack. The Rachel Sweet cover also could be heard in Season 7 of TV's Gilmore Girls.
