= (Sittin' On) The Dock of the Bay =

1968 single by Otis Redding

- An early U.S. vinyl pressing

Single by Otis Redding

from the album The Dock of the Bay
- B-side: "Sweet Lorene" (Volt issue); "Keep Your Arms Around Me" (Atco reissue)
- Released: January 8, 1968
- Recorded: November 22 and December 7, 1967
- Studio: Stax, Memphis, Tennessee
- Genre: Soul; folk
- Length: 2:38
- Label: Volt; Atco
- Songwriters: Steve Cropper; Otis Redding
- Producer: Steve Cropper

Otis Redding singles chronology
| "Knock on Wood" (1967) | "(Sittin' On) The Dock of the Bay" (1968) | "The Happy Song (Dum Dum)" (1968) |

Music video
- "(Sittin' On) The Dock of the Bay" on YouTube

"(Sittin' On) The Dock of the Bay" is a song co-written by the soul singer Otis Redding and the guitarist Steve Cropper. Redding recorded it twice in 1967, including just three days before his death in a plane crash on December 10, 1967. It was released on Stax Records' Volt label in 1968, becoming the first posthumous number 1 single in the US. It reached number 3 on the UK Singles Chart.

Redding started writing the lyrics in August 1967 while staying on a rented houseboat in Sausalito, California. He completed the song in Memphis with Cropper, a Stax producer and the guitarist for Booker T. & the M.G.'s. It features whistling and sounds of waves crashing on a shore.

== Origins ==
While on tour with the Bar-Kays in August 1967, Redding had grown in popularity and was inundated with fans at his hotel in San Francisco. Rock concert impresario Bill Graham offered Redding a respite, staying at his houseboat at Waldo Point Harbor in Sausalito, California. On the houseboat, Redding listened obsessively to the Beatles' recently released Sgt. Pepper's Lonely Hearts Club Band album and found inspiration to develop a new sound for himself. Redding started writing the lines, "Sittin' in the morning sun, I'll be sittin' when the evening comes" and the song's first verse, under the abbreviated title "Dock of the Bay."

Redding had completed his famed performance at the Monterey Pop Festival just weeks earlier. While touring in support of the albums King & Queen (a collaboration with vocalist Carla Thomas) and Live in Europe, he continued writing lines for the song on napkins and hotel paper. That November, Redding joined Cropper at the Stax recording studio in Memphis, Tennessee, where they completed and recorded it.

In a September 1990 interview on NPR's Fresh Air, Cropper said:

Otis was one of those [guys] who had 100 ideas. [...] He had been in San Francisco doing The Fillmore. And the story that I got, he was renting a boathouse, or stayed at a boathouse or something, and that's where he got the idea of the ships coming in the bay there. And that's about all he had: "I watch the ships come in and I watch them roll away again." I just took that ... and I finished the lyrics. If you listen to the songs I collaborated on with Otis, most of the lyrics are about him. [...] Otis didn't really write about himself but I did. Songs like "Mr. Pitiful," "Fa-Fa-Fa-Fa-Fa (Sad Song)"; they were about Otis and Otis' life. "Dock of the Bay" was exactly that: "I left my home in Georgia, headed for the Frisco Bay" was all about him going out to San Francisco to perform.

From those sessions emerged Redding's final recorded work, including "Dock of the Bay," which was recorded on November 22, with additional overdubs on December 7. Redding's restrained yet emotive delivery is backed by Cropper's succinct guitar playing. The song is somewhat different in style from most of Redding's recordings. While discussing it with his wife, Redding said that he wanted it to "be a little different", to "change his style". There were concerns that the song had too much of a pop feel. There were discussions of contracting the Stax gospel act the Staple Singers to record backing vocals, but this was never carried out. Redding considered the song unfinished, and planned to record what he considered a final version, but never got the chance.

The song features a whistled melody heard before it fades out; it is unclear who performed it. Some sources claim Sam Taylor, a guitarist/bandleader for Redding during the 1960s, overdubbed Redding's original, weaker whistle. However, Cropper insists that Redding's original whistle was used.

Redding continued touring after the sessions. Cropper mixed "Dock of the Bay" at Stax Studios after Redding's death. He added the sound of seagulls and crashing waves, as Redding had requested, recalling the sounds he had heard staying on the houseboat.

== Personnel ==
Information is taken from the liner notes of The Dock of the Bay.

- Otis Redding – vocals
- Booker T. Jones, Isaac Hayes – keyboards
- Steve Cropper – guitar
- Donald Dunn – bass
- Al Jackson Jr. – drums
- Wayne Jackson – trumpet

== Charts ==
=== Weekly charts ===
| Chart (1968) | Peak position |
|---|---|
| Ireland (IRMA) | 13 |
| New Zealand (Listener) | 3 |
| South Africa (Springbok Radio) | 3 |
| UK Singles Chart | 3 |
| U.S. Billboard Hot 100 | 1 |
| US Cashbox Top 100 | 3 |
| U.S. Hot Rhythm & Blues Singles | 1 |

2024 weekly chart performance for "(Sittin' On) The Dock of the Bay"
| Chart (2024) | Peak position |
|---|---|
| Netherlands (Single Top 100) | 66 |

=== Year-end charts ===
| Chart (1968) | Rank |
|---|---|
| Canada | 44 |
| UK | 38 |
| U.S. Billboard Hot 100 | 4 |

== Certifications ==
| Region | Certification | Certified units/sales |
|---|---|---|
| Denmark (IFPI Danmark) | Platinum | 90,000^{‡} |
| Germany (BVMI) | Gold | 300,000^{‡} |
| Italy (FIMI) | Platinum | 100,000^{‡} |
| Japan | — | 400,000 |
| New Zealand (RMNZ) | 6× Platinum | 180,000^{‡} |
| Spain (Promusicae) | Platinum | 60,000^{‡} |
| United Kingdom (BPI) | 3× Platinum | 1,800,000^{‡} |
| United States (RIAA) | 3× Platinum | 3,000,000^{‡} |
^{‡} Sales+streaming figures based on certification alone.

== Critical reception ==
Phil Walden and Jim Stewart were among those who had doubts about the song, the sound, and the production. Redding accepted some of the criticisms and fine-tuned the song. He reversed the opening, which was Redding's whistling part, and put it at the end as suggested. "The Dock of the Bay" was released early in 1968 and topped the charts in the US and UK. Billboard ranked the record as the number 4 song for 1968.

=== Universal success ===
"(Sittin' On) The Dock of the Bay" was released in January 1968, shortly after Redding's death. R&B stations quickly added the song to their playlists, which had been saturated with Redding's previous hits. The song shot to number 1 on the R&B charts in early 1968 and, starting in March, topped the pop charts for four weeks. The album, which shared the song's title, became his largest-selling to date, peaking at number 4 on the pop album chart. "Dock of the Bay" was popular in countries across the world and became Redding's most successful song, selling more than four million copies worldwide.

In 1969, it won two Grammy Awards: Best R&B Song and Best Male R&B Vocal Performance. In 1998 the song was inducted into the Grammy Hall of Fame.

=== Legacy ===
Redding's body of work at the time of his death was immense, including a backlog of archived recordings as well as those created in November and December 1967, just before his death. In mid-1968, Stax Records severed its distribution contract with Atlantic Records, which retained the label's back catalog and the rights to the unreleased Otis Redding masters. Through its Atco subsidiary (Atco had distributed Otis Redding's releases from Stax's Volt label), Atlantic issued three more albums of new Redding material, one live album, and eight singles between 1968 and 1970. Reprise Records issued a live album featuring Redding and Jimi Hendrix at the Monterey Pop Festival. Both studio albums and anthologies sold well in America and abroad. Redding was especially successful in the United Kingdom, where The Dock of the Bay went to number one, becoming the first posthumous album to reach the top spot there.

In 1999, BMI named the song as the sixth-most performed song of the twentieth century, with about six million performances. Rolling Stone ranked The Dock of the Bay number 161 on its 500 Greatest Albums of All Time, the third of five Redding albums on the list. "(Sittin' On) The Dock of the Bay" was ranked twenty-sixth on Rolling Stone's 500 Greatest Songs of All Time, the second-highest of four Redding songs on the list, after "Respect" (in this case the version recorded by Aretha Franklin).

Jim Morrison made reference to "Dock of the Bay" in the Doors' song "Runnin' Blue", written by Robby Krieger, from their 1969 album The Soft Parade. Morrison sings an a capella intro for the song, singing directly about Otis Redding. "Poor Otis dead and gone, left me here to sing his song, pretty little girl with a red dress on, poor Otis dead and gone." During the verse, the lyrics "Got to find a dock and a bay" are heard more than once, as well as several other references to Redding's song.

In 2013, Redding's son Otis Redding III performed the song at a ribbon-cutting ceremony for the Brannan Street Wharf on the Embarcadero in San Francisco's South Beach neighborhood. The song's lyrics are emblazoned there on a plaque, leading some to believe Redding wrote the song there (especially as the lyrics reference the "Frisco Bay"). It was actually written ten miles farther north, in Sausalito, as Redding watched "the ships come in" on Richardson Bay.

Brian May’s lyrics to "My Angels Are Calling" (2026) by Steve Cropper and the Midnight Hour with May and Billy Gibbons, written in memory of Cropper who had died after recording the music, include a reference to this song: "My angels are calling, they’re calling to take me away. They’re taking me back to my seat on the dock of the bay."

==== Usage ====
The song was featured in the films Top Gun, The Witches, and Perfect Days.

== Michael Bolton version ==
"(Sittin' On) The Dock of the Bay"
- 7-inch single cover

Single by Michael Bolton

from the album The Hunger
- B-side: "Call My Name"
- Released: 1987
- Length: 3:50
- Label: Columbia
- Songwriters: Steve Cropper; Otis Redding
- Producers: Jonathan Cain; Keith Diamond; Susan Hamilton

Michael Bolton singles chronology
| "That's What Love Is All About" (1987) | "(Sittin' On) The Dock of the Bay" (1987) | "Wait on Love" (1988) |

Music video
- "(Sittin' On) The Dock of the Bay" on YouTube

Michael Bolton included the song on his 1987 album The Hunger. His version peaked number 11 on the Billboard Hot 100 and number 12 on the Album Rock Tracks chart. The version also peaked number three in Australia, number five in Norway, and number eight in New Zealand.

Zelma Redding, Otis's widow, said she was so moved by Bolton's performance "that it brought tears to my eyes. It reminded me so much of my husband that I know if he heard it, he would feel the same." In a framed letter that hangs on the wall of Bolton's office, she referred to the record as "my all-time favorite version of my husband's classic."

=== Charts ===
| Chart (1988) | Peak position |
|---|---|
| Australia (Australian Music Report) | 3 |
| Canada (RPM) | 9 |
| New Zealand (Recorded Music NZ) | 8 |
| Norway (VG-lista) | 5 |
| UK Singles (Official Charts) | 77 |
| US Billboard Hot 100 | 11 |
| US Hot R&B/Hip-Hop Songs (Billboard) | 58 |
| US Mainstream Rock Airplay (Billboard) | 12 |

== Other cover versions ==
"(Sittin' on) The Dock of the Bay"

Single by Sammy Hagar
- B-side: "I've Done Everything for You"
- Released: 1979
- Recorded: August 1978–May 1979
- Genre: Rock
- Length: 3:03
- Label: Capitol
- Songwriters: Steve Cropper; Otis Redding
- Producer: Carter

Sammy Hagar singles chronology
| "I've Done Everything for You" (1978) | "(Sittin' on) The Dock of the Bay" (1979) | "Plain Jane" (1979) |

Several other versions of the song have charted on the Billboard Hot 100 in the United States. King Curtis' version charted for five weeks starting in March 1968 and peaked at number 84 (the same month, the original was number 1).

Glen Campbell released a version of the song on his 1968 album Wichita Lineman.

Sergio Mendes & Brasil '66's version charted for five weeks starting in June 1969, peaking at number 66.

Also in 1969 Nino Tempo and April Stevens recorded 'Sea Of Love/(Sittin' On) The Dock Of The Bay' which played upon the similarity of the chords (And the subject matter) of the two songs.

Canadian singer Michel Pagliaro reached number 70 on the Canadian charts with his version in 1977.

Sammy Hagar released a version of the song as a non-album single in 1979. His version features the song's co-writer, Steve Cropper, on guitar and members of the band Boston—Brad Delp, Sib Hashian and Barry Goudreau—on backup vocals. Music critic Thor Christensen in 1994 listed it as one of the "five worst song remakes". It charted for five weeks starting in April 1979, peaking at number 65, and number 66 in Canada.

The Reddings, who included two of Otis Redding's sons, released a version which charted for nine weeks starting in June 1982, peaking at number 55.

The song is also regularly played by American singer Sara Bareilles. The song appeared in two of her live albums: Between the Lines: Sara Bareilles Live at the Fillmore (released in 2008) and Brave Enough: Live at the Variety Playhouse (released in 2013).

== Bibliography ==
- Bowman, Rob (1997). Soulsville U.S.A.: The Story of Stax Records. New York, NY: Schirmer Trade. ISBN 978-0-8256-7284-2. OCLC 36824884.
- Guralnick, Peter (1999). Sweet Soul Music: Rhythm and Blues and the Southern Dream of Freedom. Back Bay Books. ISBN 978-0-316-33273-6. OCLC 41950519.
- Otfinoski, Steven (2003). African Americans in the Performing Arts (A to Z of African Americans). New York, NY: Facts on File. ISBN 978-0-8160-4807-6. OCLC 49558659.
- Sullivan, Steve (2013). Encyclopedia of Great Popular Song Recordings, Volume 2. Lanham, MD: Lanham: Scarecrow Press, Inc. ISBN 978-0-810-88296-6.
