= Live in Europe (Otis Redding album) =

Live album by Otis Redding
- Released: July 10, 1967
- Recorded: March 1967
- Genre: Soul; rock
- Length: 32:56
- Label: Volt/Atco
- Producer: Jim Stewart, Tom Dowd

Otis Redding chronology
King & Queen (1967)	Live in Europe (1967)	The Dock of the Bay (1968)

Professional ratings
Review scores
Source	Rating
Allmusic	3/5 stars
Rolling Stone	(favorable)
Encyclopedia of Popular Music	4/5 stars

Live in Europe is a live album by the soul singer Otis Redding. It was Redding's first live album as well as the only live album released during his lifetime, issued exactly five months before his death on December 10, 1967. The album was recorded during the Stax/Volt tour of Europe and Redding is backed by Booker T. & the MG's. Recorded at the Olympia Theatre, Paris; March 21, 1967.

The album is currently available on compact disc, digitally remastered by Bill Inglot and Dan Hersch as part of the Atlantic & Atco Remasters Series done on Rhino Records. Alternately, seven of its ten tracks appear as bonus tracks to the 2008 reissue of Otis Blue or the 2016 reissue of The Otis Redding Dictionary of Soul, also on Rhino.

== Critical reception and legacy ==
In a 1969 piece called "A Short and Happy History of Rock", published by Stereo Review, Robert Christgau selected Live in Europe as a representative Redding LP in his basic rock "library" of 25 albums. He went on to write of Redding and the album in the context of rock history:

Meanwhile, back where it all started, black music was becoming self-consciously black, returning to blues and gospel, and the late Otis Redding was king. Despite the limitations of in-concert recording, this album is his best because Redding's stage presence was integral to his popularity, and because it contains most of his best songs. Remember that the audience is white. No other black performer has ever been able to bridge the racial barrier so completely while remaining so true to himself and his skin. That's why we miss him so much.

However, Christgau's later appraisals of the album have ranged from it "captur[ing] a sensitive soul man at his toughest and most outgoing" to it being "among [Redding's] worst" due to "too many concessions to an English audience that wanted fast rock and roll songs".

In 2003, Live in Europe was ranked number 474 on Rolling Stone magazine's list of the 500 greatest albums of all time.

== Track listing ==
Side one
No.	Title	Writer(s)	Length
1.	"Respect"	Otis Redding	3:00
2.	"Can't Turn You Loose"	Redding	3:20
3.	"I've Been Loving You Too Long"	Jerry Butler, Redding	3:40
4.	"My Girl"	Smokey Robinson, Ronald White	2:44
5.	"Shake"	Sam Cooke	2:51

Side two
No.	Title	Writer(s)	Length
1.	"(I Can't Get No) Satisfaction"	Mick Jagger, Keith Richards	2:53
2.	"Fa-Fa-Fa-Fa-Fa (Sad Song)"	Steve Cropper, Redding	3:37
3.	"These Arms of Mine"	Redding	2:57
4.	"Day Tripper"	John Lennon, Paul McCartney	2:54
5.	"Try a Little Tenderness"	James Campbell, Reginald Connelly, Harry M. Woods	5:00

== Charts ==
=== Album ===
Chart	Peak position
UK Album Chart	14
US Billboard Hot R&B LPs	8
US Billboard Top LPs	32

=== Singles ===
Song	Chart	Peak position
"Shake"	UK Singles Chart	28
"Shake"	US Billboard Hot Rhythm & Blues Singles	16
"Shake"	US Billboard Hot 100	47
