= The Immortal Otis Redding =

Studio album by Otis Redding
- Released: June 15, 1968
- Genre: Soul
- Length: 30:04
- Label: Atco
- Producer: Steve Cropper

Otis Redding chronology
The Dock of the Bay (1968)	The Immortal Otis Redding (1968)	In Person at the Whisky a Go Go (1968)

The Immortal Otis Redding is a posthumous studio album by the American soul recording artist Otis Redding, released on June 15, 1968, by Atco Records. It compiles 11 songs recorded by Redding in a three-week stretch of sessions that concluded days prior to his death in December 1967. "The Happy Song (Dum-Dum)" was the only song previously released, having been a single in April 1968. The Immortal Otis Redding featured four charting singles including "The Happy Song", "I've Got Dreams to Remember", "Amen", and "Hard to Handle".

== Critical reception and legacy ==
Writing for Creem magazine in 1977, Robert Christgau called The Immortal Otis Redding his favorite album by Redding and "probably among my five most-played LPs", because it "showcases the unduplicated warmth, tenderness, and humor of his ballad singing". The following year, it was voted the 33rd best album ever in Paul Gambaccini's poll of prominent rock critics, published in his book Rock Critics' Choice: The Top 200 Albums. Christgau ranked it third in a list accompanying the book. The album was included in "A Basic Record Library" of 1950s and 1960s recordings, published in Christgau's Record Guide: Rock Albums of the Seventies (1981).

Music critic Dave Marsh gave the album five stars in The New Rolling Stone Record Guide (1983). Lindsay Planer of AllMusic gave it three-and-a-half stars and said although it "wasn't quite on par with" Redding's several other studio albums, the songs on The Immortal Otis Redding were "welcome (if not mandatory) additions to all manner of listeners".

== Track listing ==
Side one
No.	Title	Writer(s)	Length
1.	"I've Got Dreams to Remember"	Otis Redding, Zelma Redding, Joe Rock	3:10
2.	"You Made a Man Out of Me"	Deanie Parker, Steve Cropper	2:06
3.	"Nobody's Fault But Mine"	Redding	2:20
4.	"Hard to Handle"	Redding, Alvertis Isbell, Allen Jones	2:21
5.	"Thousand Miles Away"	Redding	2:09
6.	"The Happy Song (Dum-Dum-De-De-De-Dum-Dum)"	Redding, Cropper	2:40

Side two
No.	Title	Writer(s)	Length
1.	"Think About It"	Don Covay, Redding	2:59
2.	"A Waste of Time"	Redding	3:15
3.	"Champagne and Wine"	Redding, Roy Johnson, Alan Walden	2:49
4.	"A Fool for You"	Ray Charles	2:55
5.	"Amen"	Jester Hairston (uncredited)	3:20

== Personnel ==
Credits adapted from Allmusic.

- Otis Redding – vocals
- Booker T. Jones, Isaac Hayes – keyboards, piano
- Steve Cropper – guitar, producer
- Donald Dunn – bass guitar
- Al Jackson Jr. – drums
- Wayne Jackson – trumpet
- Andrew Love, Joe Arnold – tenor saxophone

== Charts ==
=== Album ===
Chart	Peak position
UK Album Chart	19
US Billboard Hot R&B LPs	3
US Billboard Top LPs	58

=== Singles ===
Song	Chart	Peak position
"The Happy Song (Dum-Dum)"	US Billboard Hot Rhythm & Blues Singles	10
"The Happy Song (Dum-Dum)"	US Billboard Hot 100	25
"The Happy Song (Dum-Dum)"	UK Singles Chart	24
"I've Got Dreams to Remember"	US Billboard Hot Rhythm & Blues Singles	6
"I've Got Dreams to Remember"	US Billboard Hot 100	41
"Amen"	US Billboard Hot Rhythm & Blues Singles	15
"Amen"	US Billboard Hot 100	36
"Hard to Handle" (B-Side of "Amen")	US Billboard Hot Rhythm & Blues Singles	38
"Hard to Handle" (B-Side of "Amen")	US Billboard Hot 100	51
"Hard to Handle" (B-Side of "Amen")	UK Singles Chart	15
