= Historic Performances Recorded at the Monterey International Pop Festival =

Live album by the Jimi Hendrix Experience and Otis Redding
- Released: August 26, 1970
- Recorded: June 1967
- Venue: Monterey Pop Festival, California
- Genre: Rock; soul
- Label: Reprise
- Producer: Lou Adler; John Phillips

Jimi Hendrix U.S. chronology
| Band of Gypsys (1970) | Historic Performances Recorded at the Monterey International Pop Festival (1970) | The Cry of Love (1971) |

Otis Redding chronology
| Tell the Truth (1970) | Historic Performances (1970) | The Best of Otis Redding (1972) |

Historic Performances Recorded at the Monterey International Pop Festival is a live album recorded at the Monterey Pop Festival in June 1967. A split artist release, it includes some of the performances by the Jimi Hendrix Experience on side one and Otis Redding on side two. It has been supplanted by later more comprehensive releases, Live at Monterey (Hendrix, 2007) and Captured Live at the Monterey International Pop Festival (Do It Just One More Time!) (Redding, 2019).

== Release and charts ==
Reprise Records released Historic Performances in the United States on August 26, 1970, less than a month before Hendrix died. It reached number 16 on the Billboard 200 albums chart and number 15 on the magazine's Top R&B Albums chart. The Recording Industry Association of America certified it as a gold album, signifying one million dollars in sales. The album was not released in the United Kingdom.

== Critical reception and historical significance ==
Professional ratings
Review scores
| Source | Rating |
|---|---|
| AllMusic | 3/5 stars |
| Christgau's Record Guide | A− |
| Encyclopedia of Popular Music | 4/5 stars |
| The Rolling Stone Album Guide | 4/5 stars |

In a contemporary review of the album, Jeffrey Drucker of Rolling Stone magazine said "memories are made of sets like this", and "even if you weren't [there], you'll find some very satisfying music by two of our most gifted artists."

In Christgau's Record Guide: Rock Albums of the Seventies (1981), music critic Robert Christgau called the album "as evocative a distillation of the hippie moment in all its hope and contradiction as you'll ever hear." He described Redding and Hendrix as "two radically different black artists showboating at the nativity of the new white rock audience", who had both "performed more subtly and more brilliantly" elsewhere, and were "equally audacious and equally wonderful" at the festival.

In a lukewarm review, AllMusic's Bruce Eder regarded Historic Performances as a significant album when it was released, but it has become "purely of historic interest as an artifact of the time."

Before the Monterey Pop performance, Jimi Hendrix was a musician with success in the UK but nowhere else in the world. At Monterey Pop, Hendrix performed in front of an estimated 25,000-90,000 people. At the end of the song ‘Wild thing’—which appears on this recording-- Hendrix lit his guitar on fire, smashed it 7 times, and threw its remains into the crowd. This performance gained national attention and made Hendrix famous in the US, and led to the later opportunity to headline at Woodstock, one of the largest rock festivals of all time and a highlight of the 1960s in the US.

== Track listing ==
Side one: the Jimi Hendrix Experience
| No. | Title | Writer(s) | Length |
|---|---|---|---|
| 1. | "Like a Rolling Stone" | Bob Dylan | 6:22 |
| 2. | "Rock Me Baby" | B.B. King, Joe Josea | 3:00 |
| 3. | "Can You See Me" | Jimi Hendrix | 2:30 |
| 4. | "Wild Thing" | Chip Taylor | 7:30 |

Side two: Otis Redding
| No. | Title | Writer(s) | Length |
|---|---|---|---|
| 1. | "Shake" | Sam Cooke | 2:37 |
| 2. | "Respect" | Otis Redding | 3:22 |
| 3. | "I've Been Loving You Too Long" | Redding, Jerry Butler | 3:32 |
| 4. | "(I Can't Get No) Satisfaction" | Mick Jagger, Keith Richards | 3:21 |
| 5. | "Try a Little Tenderness" | Harry M. Woods, Jimmy Campbell, Reginald Connelly | 4:40 |

== Personnel ==
Side one

- Jimi Hendrix – electric guitar, vocals
- Noel Redding – bass guitar
- Mitch Mitchell – drums

Side two

- Otis Redding – vocals
- Booker T. Jones – keyboards
- Steve Cropper – electric guitar
- Donald "Duck" Dunn – bass guitar
- Al Jackson Jr. – drums
- Wayne Jackson – trumpet
- Andrew Love – tenor saxophone

Production

- Producers: Lou Adler, John Phillips
- Engineers: Wally Heider, Eric Weinberg
- Photography: Jim Marshall
- Cover Layout: Ed Thrasher

== Charts ==
| Chart (1970) | Peak position |
|---|---|
| US Billboard Top LPs | 16 |
| US Top R&B Albums | 15 |

== Bibliography ==
- DeCurtis, Anthony; Henke, James; George-Warren, Holly (1992). The Rolling Stone Album Guide (3rd ed.). Random House. ISBN 0679737294.
- Larkin, Colin (2006). Encyclopedia of Popular Music. Vol. 4 (4th ed.). Oxford University Press. ISBN 0195313739.
