= Do the Twist! with Ray Charles =

Greatest hits album by Ray Charles
- Released: 1961
- Recorded: 1954–1960
- Genre: R&B
- Length: 32:39
- Label: Atlantic

Ray Charles chronology
The Genius Sings the Blues (1961)	Do the Twist! with Ray Charles (1961)	Soul Meeting (1961)

Professional ratings
Review scores
Source	Rating
AllMusic (link)	3/5 stars
The Rolling Stone Record Guide	5/5 stars

Do the Twist! with Ray Charles is a 1961 Atlantic Records compilation album of previously released Ray Charles songs. The album spent one year on the Billboard charts and peaked at number 11.

In 1963, the album got a new cover and was renamed The Greatest Ray Charles. Track listing and catalog number (Atlantic 8054) remained the same.

== Track listing ==
All songs written by Ray Charles except as indicated.

=== Side A ===
1. "Tell Me How Do You Feel?" (Mayfield, Charles) – 2:38
2. "I Got A Woman" – 6:07
3. "Heartbreaker" (Nugetre) – 2:50
4. "Tell the Truth" – 3:12

=== Side B ===
1. "What'd I Say" – 6:25
2. "Talkin' 'bout You" – 4:12
3. "You Be My Baby" (Pomus, Shuman) – 2:25
4. "Leave My Woman Alone" – 2:37
5. "I'm Movin' On" (Snow) – 2:13
