= Good to Me: Live at the Whisky a Go Go, Vol. 2 =

1993 live album by Otis Redding

Live album by Otis Redding
- Released: 1993
- Recorded: April 8–10, 1966
- Venue: Whisky a Go Go, Sunset Strip, Los Angeles, California
- Genre: Soul music
- Length: 46:54
- Label: Stax
- Producer: Al Jackson Jr.

Otis Redding chronology
| The Very Best of Otis Redding, Vol. 1 (1992) | Good to Me: Live at the Whisky a Go Go, Vol. 2 (1993) | Otis! The Definitive Otis Redding (1993) |

Professional ratings
Review scores
| Source | Rating |
|---|---|
| Allmusic | 4/5 stars |

Good to Me: Live at the Whisky a Go Go, Vol. 2 is a live album by American soul singer-songwriter Otis Redding, recorded at the Whisky a Go Go on Sunset Strip in Los Angeles, California in April 1966. The recording was made before Otis Redding attained crossover fame at the Monterey Pop Festival, and with his regular touring band. His other available live performances, the 1967 European Stax/Volt revue and 1967 Monterey Pop Festival are recorded with Booker T. & the M.G.'s and The Mar-Keys horns.

Eight of the tracks on this album (3–6, 9–12) were originally released on Recorded Live: Previously Unreleased Performances (Atlantic SD 19346). However, the rights to the recordings had reverted to Stax from Atlantic in 1972 and erroneously submitted back to Atlantic for that release. This album corrects the mistake by reissuing the album on the Stax label while including additional bonus material.

== Good To Me (1993) track listing ==
| No. | Title | Writer(s) | Length |
|---|---|---|---|
| 1. | "Introduction" | | 0:38 |
| 2. | "I'm Depending On You" | Otis Redding | 2:56 |
| 3. | "Your One And Only Man" | Redding | 3:27 |
| 4. | "Good To Me" | Julius E. Green, Redding | 4:35 |
| 5. | "Chained and Bound" | Redding | 7:19 |
| 6. | "Ole Man Trouble" | Redding | 2:42 |
| 7. | "Pain in My Heart" | Naomi Neville | 2:46 |
| 8. | "These Arms of Mine" | Redding | 3:31 |
| 9. | "I Can't Turn You Loose" | Redding | 6:13 |
| 10. | "I've Been Loving You Too Long" | Jerry Butler, Redding | 5:51 |
| 11. | "Security" | Redding | 2:40 |
| 12. | "A Hard Day's Night" | John Lennon, Paul McCartney | 4:16 |

== Recorded Live (1982) track listing ==
Side one
| No. | Title | Writer(s) | Length |
|---|---|---|---|
| 1. | "Destiny" (same recording as "Your One And Only Man" above) | Wayne Moman | 2:40 |
| 2. | "Good To Me" | Julius E. Green, Otis Redding | 3:57 |
| 3. | "Chained and Bound" | Redding | 6:47 |
| 4. | "Ol' Man Trouble" | Redding | 2:30 |

Side two
| No. | Title | Writer(s) | Length |
|---|---|---|---|
| 5. | "I Can't Turn You Loose" | Redding | 5:41 |
| 6. | "I've Been Loving You Too Long" | Jerry Butler, Redding | 5:35 |
| 7. | "Security" | Redding | 2:19 |
| 8. | "A Hard Day's Night" | John Lennon, Paul McCartney | 4:09 |

- Note: The individual song timings do not include either applause or spoken introductions between selections

== Personnel ==
- Otis Redding – vocals
- James Young – guitar
- Robert Holloway – tenor saxophone
- Robert Pittman – tenor saxophone
- Donald Henry – tenor saxophone
- Sammy Coleman – trumpet
- John Farris – trumpet
- Clarence Johnson – trombone
- Ralph Stewart – bass guitar
- Elbert Woodson – drums
