= Tramp (Lowell Fulson song) =

Song by Lowell Fulson

Single by Lowell Fulson

from the album Tramp
- B-side: "Pico"
- Released: January 1967
- Recorded: 1966
- Genre: Soul blues, funk
- Length: 3:04
- Label: Kent
- Songwriters: Lowell Fulson, Jimmy McCracklin

Lowell Fulson singles chronology
"Black Nights" (1967)	"Tramp" (1967)	"Make a Little Love" (1967)

"Tramp" is a soul blues song with funk elements, written by West Coast blues artists Lowell Fulson and Jimmy McCracklin. First recorded by Fulson in 1967, it was his highest-charting single since "Reconsider Baby" in 1954. It reached #56 in Canada. The song was covered by Otis Redding in a duet with Carla Thomas, and this version reached No. 2 on Billboard R&B chart.

== Background and release ==
Jules Bihari, the owner of Fulson's label, Kent Records, disliked the song at first: "Oh, he hated 'Tramp', Jules [Bihari] did.", Fulson recalled. However, when Bihari previewed the song for two influential disc jockeys, the response was "Hush! Man, get me my copy, quick. You sitting on a gold mine, talking about you want to hear some blues. You better get that record out." Fulson elaborated:

And they [Kent] did, they followed his [Bugs Scruggs] advice because he was a disc jockey. And so they took them some copies, and they just had a few pressed up, hadn't even thought about putting it out. But after I got with Bugs and Paw-Paw [Birmingham, Alabama, DJ], we laughed and joked and the next thing that I know that thing was making plenty of noise. And then Otis Redding jumped all over it, which I didn't mind a bit. But I said, "I wished you had given me another week." He took it right on to the pop field, you know.

When Kent released it as a single, "Tramp" became a hit, peaking at number five in the Billboard R&B chart. The song was also Fulson's most popular single in the broader, pop-oriented Billboard Hot 100 chart, where it reached number 52.

As one of Fulson's best-known songs, "Tramp" appears on numerous compilations, including the popular 1967 Kent album, also titled Tramp. For the album cover, Fulson, who normally wore suits, posed dressed up as a railroad yard hobo:

Them kids sat up all night making them jeans, sewing rags and things on 'em. They tried to make me look as ragged as they could. I had a Dobbs hat. So I said, now, if they paying attention to my hat, they know I ain't a bum 'cause I couldn't buy this hat ... So I talked 'em out of [wearing a Moms Mabley-type] hat; I wore my hat.

== Lyrics ==
The song is partly narrative, with the singer ignoring the criticism of his unsophisticated appearance:

Tramp
You can call me that
I don't wear continental clothes stetson hats ...
Call me country right from the woods
I'll answer when you call me
That is baby if it makes you feel good
But I'm just a lover ...
Loving's all I know to do

== Critical reception ==
Fulson's "Tramp" has been described as a "comfortably laid-back but groovin' soul-blues workout" and "a loping funk-injected workout [which restored] the guitarist to R&B stardom", by AllMusic reviewers. The entertainment magazine LA Weekly called it "a near-perfect slice of barbecued funk".

== Otis Redding and Carla Thomas version ==
"Tramp"

Single by Otis Redding & Carla Thomas

from the album King & Queen
- B-side: "Tell It Like It Is"
- Released: 1967
- Recorded: 1967
- Genre: Soul
- Length: 3:03
- Label: Stax
- Songwriters: Lowell Fulson, Jimmy McCracklin
- Producer: Jim Stewart

Otis Redding & Carla Thomas singles chronology
"Let Me Come on Home" (1967)	"Tramp" (1967)	"Knock on Wood" (1967)

Carla Thomas singles chronology
"When Tomorrow Comes" (1967)	"Tramp" (1967)	"Knock on Wood" (1967)

Otis Redding recorded "Tramp" as a duet with Carla Thomas for Stax Records. The song was first included on the joint album by Redding and Thomas, King & Queen (1967). Described as "playful" by Dahl, it was released as a single only months after Fulson's. Credited to "Otis and Carla", the duo's version outsold Fulson's original and peaked at number two on Billboard's Top Selling R&B singles and number 26 on the Hot 100 charts.

In Dynamic Duets: The Best Pop Collaborations from 1955 to 1999, author Bob Leszczak describes their rendition:

Otis and Carla gave "Tramp" their own stamp. They exchange quite a bit of dialogue between them in the song, with Carla putting Otis down because he doesn't wear fine clothes and is in dire need of a haircut ... She's obviously a gold digger and laments that he couldn't afford to buy her fine furs and cool cars. She repeatedly calls him a "tramp" from the Georgia woods ... Otis Redding was born, like "Tramp" says, in the Georgia woods in 1941.

Leszczak points out that the Otis and Carla single peaked higher in the UK, where it reached number 18 on the UK Singles Chart (Fulson's single did not appear in the UK charts). He also notes "the song's beat likely influenced 'You Haven't Done Nothin'' by Stevie Wonder seven years later".

This song would later be partially sampled in the They Might Be Giants cover of the song "Lady Is a Tramp" on their compilation album Miscellaneous T.

== Charts ==
Chart (1967)	Peak position
UK Singles (Official Charts)	18
UK R&B (Record Mirror)	1
US Billboard Hot 100	26
US Hot R&B/Hip-Hop Songs (Billboard)	2
Canada R&B	10
Canada Top 100	43

== Other renditions ==
- In 1968, Fulson's "Tramp" was used as the basis for "The Champ", an organ riff-driven instrumental by a group of session musicians dubbed the Mohawks. The piece has been "widely sampled in rap for this riff and for its breakbeat rhythm".
- In 1986, Salt-n-Pepa sampled the Otis and Carla rendition of the song, but kept the original title. Selected as number six in the list of "Vibe's 10 Greatest Otis Redding-sampled Songs", their rendition is described as "the perfect vehicle for the female hip-hop pioneers’ brazen diss of the cheating opposite sex". The duo's song reached number 31 on Billboard's Hot Black Singles chart. NME said, " the combination of the updated lyrics, the sheer power of the percussion breaks and of course, the horn section riffs from the original song make this one of the best examples of the way hip- hop can reach into the past and still create something fresh and original."
- In 1991, DJ Muggs "made 'Tramp' the principal building block of 'How I Could Just Kill a Man,' the grimy fuck-it-all gun blast that announced the arrival of Cypress Hill", according to LA Weekly's Josh Kun. He added, "The song was the highlight of Cypress Hill's 1991 debut album, which sounded like nothing else in hip-hop, east or west."
