= Lovey Dovey =

1954 single by The Clovers

Single by The Clovers
- A-side: "Little Mama"
- Released: 1954
- Genre: R&B
- Length: 2:54
- Label: Atlantic Records 45-1022
- Songwriters: Memphis Edward Curtis, Ahmet Ertegun

The Clovers singles chronology
| "Comin' On" (1953) | "Lovey Dovey" (1954) | "Little Mama" (1954) |

Official audio
- "Lovey Dovey" on YouTube

"Lovey Dovey"

Single by Buddy Knox
- B-side: "I Got You"
- Released: November 1960
- Recorded: 1960
- Genre: Rock and roll
- Length: 2:11
- Label: Liberty
- Songwriters: Memphis Edward Curtis, Ahmet Ertegun

Buddy Knox singles chronology
| "Long Lonely Nights" (1960) | "Lovey Dovey" (1960) | "Ling, Ting, Tong" (1961) |

"Lovey Dovey" is a popular 1954 American rhythm and blues song written by Eddie Curtis and Ahmet Ertegun, with the latter usually credited using his songwriter's pseudonym "Nugetre" (Ertegun spelled backwards). The song's initial recording by The Clovers remains the best known version, reaching No. 2 for five weeks on the R&B charts in 1954.

== Background ==
The song deals with the singer's relationship with his sweetheart and is performed in a light-hearted style.

The saxophone is played by Sam "The Man" Taylor and the piano by Vann "Piano Man" Walls.

== Cover versions ==
Numerous artists have recorded the song. Cover versions have been recorded by:

- Clyde McPhatter (1959) reached No. 12 (R&B) and No. 49 (Pop)
- Buddy Knox in 1960, reached No. 25 pop
- Dick Dale (1962)
- The Coasters (1964)
- Bunny Sigler (1967) ("Lovey Dovey"/"You're So Fine"), reached No. 86 pop, No. 87 Canadian pop and No. 24 Can. R&B
- Otis Redding and Carla Thomas (1967) (released as a single in 1968, following Redding's death), reached No. 21 R&B and No. 60 pop. Also reached No. 17 UK R&B and No. 48 in Canada.
- Delbert McClinton (1976) on the album Genuine Cowhide

== Legacy ==
Lyrics from "Lovey Dovey" (particularly "You're the cutest thing, That I ever did see, I really love your peaches, Wanna shake your tree"), were used by Steve Miller in his 1974 chart-topping single "The Joker". "The Joker" in turn was later sampled on another number one hit, "Angel" by Shaggy, giving Ahmet Ertegun credit as a songwriter on the latter.
