= Carla Thomas =

American singer (born 1942)

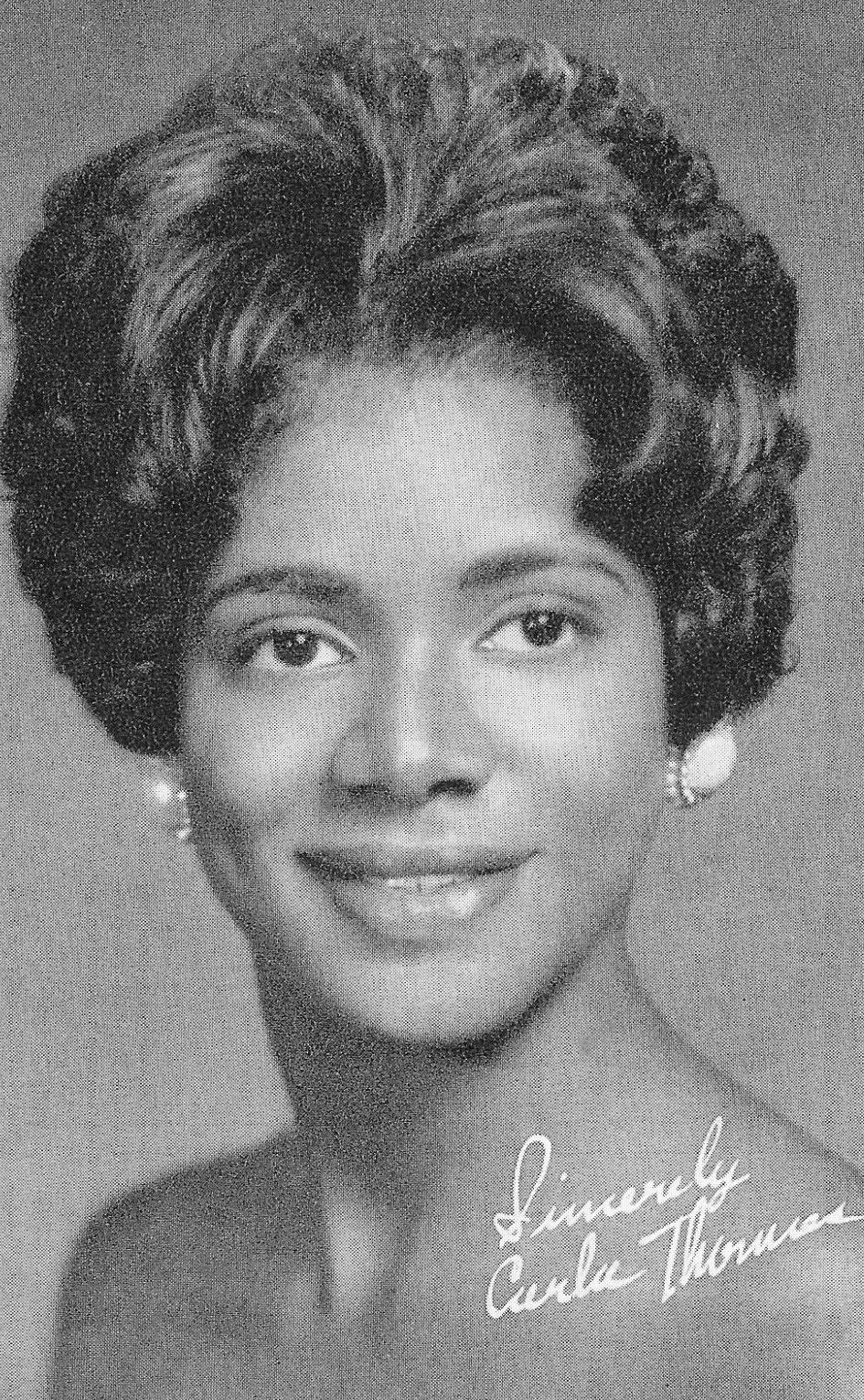
- Carla Thomas c. 1960s

Background information
- Born: Carla Venita Thomas; December 21, 1942 (age 83); Memphis, Tennessee, U.S.
- Genres: R&B; Memphis soul; Southern soul; soul
- Occupation: Vocalist
- Instrument: Vocals
- Years active: 1960–present
- Label: Stax

Carla Venita Thomas (born December 21, 1942) is an American singer, who is often referred to as the Queen of Memphis Soul. She is best known for her 1960s recordings for Atlantic and Stax including the hits "Gee Whiz (Look at His Eyes)" (1960), "B-A-B-Y" (1966) and "Tramp" (1967), a duet with Otis Redding. She is the daughter of Rufus Thomas.

== Biography ==
=== Childhood ===
Thomas was born and raised in the Foote Homes Projects in Memphis, Tennessee, United States. Along with her siblings, Marvell and Vaneese, she was one of three musical children of Rufus and Lorene Thomas. Despite growing up in the projects, the Thomas family lived near the Palace Theater on Beale Street, as Rufus was the theater's Master of Ceremonies (MC) for their amateur shows.

=== Teen Town Singers ===
As a 10-year-old student, Thomas was responsible for not only attending classes and completing her schoolwork, but she also had to attend rehearsals on Wednesdays and Fridays after school and then perform at the station on Saturday. Despite the grueling schedule, she enjoyed the experience: "It was a lot of fun, it really was." She remained with the Teen Town Singers until the end of her senior year.

=== 1960s ===
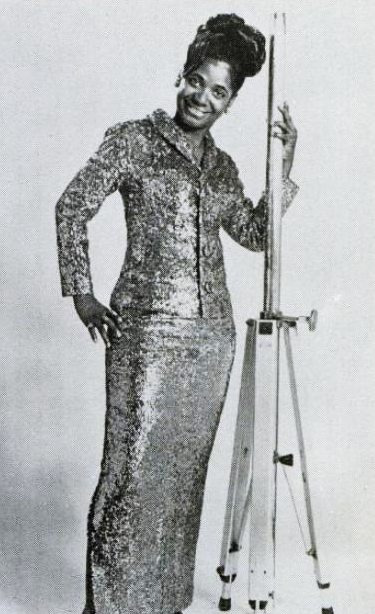
Carla Thomas in 1966

Thomas is best known for the work she completed for both Atlantic Records and most notably, Stax Records in the 1960s. Her first record, "'Cause I Love You" (1960), was a duet with her father, with brother Marvell on keyboards, that was released by Satellite Records, which eventually became Stax Records. Recorded when Thomas was still attending Hamilton High School in Memphis, the record drew enough local attention to catch the interest of Jerry Wexler of Atlantic Records.

He signed a deal with the owners of Satellite Records, Jim Stewart and Estelle Axton, to distribute "Cause I Love You" and thus paved the way for Thomas’ most famous single, "Gee Whiz (Look at His Eyes)", reaching number 10 on the pop chart and number 5 on the R&B chart. While she continued to have success on the R&B charts throughout the 1960s, her only other solo top 40 pop hit was "B-A-B-Y", reaching number 14 in 1966. Her duet, "Tramp", with Otis Redding reached number 26 on the pop chart the following year.and her album of duets with Otis Redding, King & Queen, was a number 18 hit in the UK Albums Chart.

==== "Gee Whiz (Look at His Eyes)" ====
Although this single would eventually chart within the Top 10 on the pop chart and within the top 5 on the R&B chart, it had an inauspicious beginning. Initially recorded at the Thomas family home, Rufus shopped the song to Vee-Jay Records in Chicago. Vee-Jay never followed through or actively pursued securing the distribution rights. Because of his belief in the song's potential, Rufus returned to Memphis and in the summer of 1960, Thomas would cut the teen love song that she wrote when she was only 15 years old. The song was released by Rufus and Carla in October 1960, to not much fanfare. By February 1961, thanks to a distribution deal between Satellite and Atlantic Records, the song was being distributed nationally through Atlantic just as Thomas was in the midst of her first year at Tennessee A&I University in Nashville. The success of the single also propelled Thomas into the spotlight, as she performed on American Bandstand. According to Thomas, "The record was young-sounding, romantic and it expressed what a lot of people wanted to say at that age, but still, I was surprised at how well it did".

=== 1970s–present ===
After her last Stax recording in 1971, Love Means..., and an appearance in Wattstax in 1972, Thomas slipped into relative obscurity when compared to her 1960s musical heyday. She featured in a number of modern-day projects, including a 1994 compilation of her greatest hits, a 2002 live recording of a Memphis performance and the 2007 release Live at the Bohemian Caverns in Washington, D.C., a long lost live recording of Thomas in 1967. She would also occasionally tour during the 1980s and became heavily involved in the “Artists in the Schools” program that provided Memphis schoolchildren with access to successful artists. These workshops were organized to talk to teenagers about music, performing arts and drug abuse. In 1991, she appeared with her father at the Porretta Terme Soul Festival. In 1993, Thomas was awarded the prestigious Pioneer Award, along with such musical heavyweights as James Brown and Solomon Burke, from the Rhythm & Blues Foundation in honor of her career achievements. She was also featured in the 2003 documentary Only the Strong Survive, that was shown at the Cannes Film Festival and showcased important Stax recording artists. In 2021, Thomas featured on Valerie June's single "Call Me a Fool", which received a GRAMMY nomination for Best American Roots Song.

== Artistry ==
=== Influences ===
Carla's biggest influence was her father, Rufus. Besides accompanying him during his 'MC' days at the Palace Theater, Rufus also encouraged and believed in his daughter's ability. According to Carla, “My dad probably discovered I could sing before I did”.

Musically, Thomas was inspired by Jackie Wilson and Brenda Lee.

== Awards and nominations ==
=== Grammy Awards ===
Year	Nominee / work	Award	Result	Ref.
1968	"The Queen Alone"	Best Female R&B Vocal Performance	Nominated	

== Discography ==
=== Studio albums ===
Year	Album	Peak chart positions			Label
Year	Album	US	US R&B	UK R&B	Label
1961	Gee Whiz	—	—	—	Atlantic
1965	Comfort Me	134	11	—	Stax
1966	Carla	130	7	7	Stax
1967	The Queen Alone	133	16	—	Stax
1969	Memphis Queen	151	26	—	Stax
1971	Love Means...	—	42	—	Stax
"—" denotes releases that did not chart.

=== Live albums ===
- 2002: Live in Memphis (Memphis International)
- 2007: Live at the Bohemian Caverns (Stax/Concord) recorded live May 27, 1967 in Washington, D.C.

=== Collaborations ===
- 1967: King & Queen (with Otis Redding) (Stax) – US No. 36, R&B No. 5

=== Compilations ===
- 1969: The Best of Carla Thomas (Stax) – US No. 190
- 1994: Gee Whiz: The Best of Carla Thomas (Rhino)
- 2004: Hidden Gems (Stax) previously unissued material recorded between 1960 and 1968

=== Singles ===
List of singles, with selected chart positions, showing year released and album name
Title	Year	Peak chart positions				Certifications	Album
Title	Year	US	US R&B /HH	UK	UK R&B	Certifications	Album
"Cause I Love You" (with Rufus Thomas)	1960	—	—	—	—		Non-album single
"Gee Whiz (Look at His Eyes)"	1960	10	5	—	—		Gee Whiz
"A Love of My Own"	1961	56	20	—	—		Gee Whiz
"I Didn't Believe" (with Rufus Thomas)	1961	—	—	—	—		Non-album single
"(Mama, Mama) Wish Me Good Luck"	1961	—	—	—	—		Non-album single
"I Kinda Think He Does"	1961	—	—	—	—		Non-album single
"I'll Bring It Home to You"	1962	41	9	—	—		Non-album single
"What a Fool I've Been"	1963	93	28	—	—		Non-album single
"Gee Whiz, It's Christmas"	1963	—	—	—	—		Non-album single
A-side: "That's Really Some Good" (with Rufus Thomas)	1964	92	30 (Note: From November 30, 1963 to January 23, 1965, the Billboard R&B singles chart was temporarily discontinued. Billboard determined it unnecessary due to so much crossover of titles between the R&B and pop charts in light of the rise of Motown. The chart was reinstated as Hot Rhythm & Blues Singles on January 30, 1965. For the period in which no chart was published, Billboard now uses Cash Box magazine's Top 50 In R&B Locations singles chart for data.)	—	—		Non-album single
B-side: "Night Time Is the Right Time" (with Rufus Thomas)	1964	94	—	—	—		Non-album single
"I've Got No Time to Lose"	1964	67	13	—	9		Non-album single
"A Woman's Love"	1964	71	29	—	—		Non-album single
"How Do You Quit (Someone You Love)"	1965	—	39	—	—		Non-album single
"Stop! Look What You're Doin'"	1965	92	30	—	—		Non-album single
"When You Move You Lose" (with Rufus Thomas)	1965	—	—	—	—		Non-album single
"Comfort Me"	1965	—	—	—	—		Comfort Me
"Birds & Bees" (with Rufus Thomas)	1966	—	—	—	—		Non-album single
"Let Me Be Good to You"	1966	62	11	—	—		Carla
"B-A-B-Y"	1966	14	3	—	—	RIAA: Gold	Carla
"All I Want for Christmas Is You"	1966	—	—	—	—		Non-album single
"Something Good (Is Going to Happen to You)"	1967	74	29	—	—		The Queen Alone
"When Tomorrow Comes"	1967	99	—	—			The Queen Alone
"Tramp" (with Otis Redding)	1967	26	2	18	1		King & Queen
"I'll Always Have Faith in You"	1967	85	11	—	—		The Queen Alone
"Knock on Wood" (with Otis Redding)	1967	30	8	35	8		King & Queen
"Pick Up the Pieces"	1967	68	16	—	15		Non-album single
"Lovey Dovey" (with Otis Redding)	1968	60	21	—	17		King & Queen
"A Dime a Dozen"	1968	114	—	—	—		Non-album single
"Where Do I Go?"	1968	86	38	—	—		Memphis Queen
"I've Fallen in Love"	1969	117	36	—	—		Memphis Queen
"I Like What You're Doing to Me"	1969	49	9	—	—		Memphis Queen
"When Something Is Wrong with My Baby" (with Otis Redding)	1969	109	—	—	—		King & Queen
"Just Keep On Loving Me" (with Johnnie Taylor)	1969	115	—	—	—		Non-album single
"I Need You Woman" (with Johnnie Taylor)	1969	106	—	—	—		Non-album single
"Guide Me Well"	1970	107	41	—	—		Memphis Queen
"Live in the City"	1970	—	—	—	—		Non-album single
"I Loved You Like I Love My Very Life"	1971	—	—	—	—		Non-album single
"You've Got a Cushion to Fall On"	1972	—	49	—	—		Non-album single
"Sugar"	1972	—	—	—	—		Non-album single
"I May Not Be All You Want (But I'm All You Got)"	1973	—	—	—	—		Non-album single
"Love Among the People"	1974	—	—	—	—		Non-album single
"—" denotes releases that did not chart or were not released in that territory.

=== As featured artist ===
Title	Year	Peak chart positions	Album
Title	Year	US AAA	Album
"Call Me a Fool" (Valerie June featuring Carla Thomas)	2021	24	The Moon and Stars: Prescriptions for Dreamers

== See also ==
- Rufus and Carla
- Marvell Thomas
