= The MG's (album) =

Studio album by the MG's
- Released: 1973
- Recorded: 1973
- Studio: Stax, Memphis
- Genre: R&B, instrumental rock
- Length: 34:41
- Label: Stax
- Producer: Donald "Duck" Dunn, Al Jackson, Jr.

The MG's chronology
Melting Pot (1971)	The MG's (1973)	Universal Language (1977)

Professional ratings
Review scores
Source	Rating
AllMusic	3/5 stars

The MG's is a 1973 instrumental album recorded by the MG's for Stax Records. By 1973, leader/keyboardist Booker T. Jones and guitarist Steve Cropper were both estranged from Stax and residing full-time in Los Angeles, so remaining members Donald "Duck" Dunn and Al Jackson, Jr. recruited Bobby Manuel and Carson Whitsett to replace Cropper and Jones respectively to help them record the album.

Billed as "the MG's" since Jones was not involved with the project, the group released two singles, "Sugarcane/Blackside" and "Neckbone/Breezy" (the b-side was a non-album cut). The singles and the album were not commercially successful, but were critically well received. The album included an instrumental cover of the Spinners' "One of a Kind (Love Affair)".

By 1975, Jones and Cropper agreed to reform the original lineup with Jackson and Dunn, but just days before their scheduled reunion, Jackson was murdered at his home in Memphis, Tennessee.

== Track listing ==
All tracks composed by Donald "Duck" Dunn, Al Jackson, Jr., Bobby Manuel, Carson Whitsett; except where indicated

Side one

1. "Sugarcane" (3:06) (David Madden)
2. "Neckbone" (3:25)
3. "Spare Change" (3:51)
4. "Leaving the Past" (7:18)

Side two

1. "Left Overs (Bucaramanga)" (2:59) (Luiz, Sainz, Serrano)
2. "Blackside" (3:57)
3. "One of a Kind (Love Affair)" (3:21) (Joseph B. Jefferson)
4. "Frustration" (6:22)

== Personnel ==
The M.G.s

- Bobby Manuel – electric guitar, classical guitar, acoustic guitar
- Carson Whitsett – piano, Hammond organ, clavinet, Fender Rhodes, celesta
- Donald Dunn – bass guitar
- Al Jackson Jr. – drums, percussion
