= Time Is Tight =

Single by Booker T. & the M.G.'s

from the album Up Tight
- B-side: "Johnny, I Love You"
- Released: February 1969
- Genre: Soul
- Length: 3:14
- Label: Stax; 0028
- Songwriters: Booker T. Jones; Al Jackson Jr.; Donald "Duck" Dunn; Steve Cropper
- Producer: Booker T. Jones

Booker T. & the M.G.'s singles chronology
"Hang 'Em High" (1968)	"Time Is Tight" (1969)	"Mrs. Robinson" (1969)

Official audio
- "Time Is Tight" on YouTube

"Time Is Tight" is an instrumental recorded by Booker T. & the M.G.'s for their soundtrack to the drama film UpTight (1968).

== Background ==
The group recorded two versions of the track – the shorter (3:14), slower version was released as a single in 1969, and became one of the biggest hits of the group's career, peaking in the US charts at #7 R&B and #6 Pop and reaching number 1 in South Africa. The longer (4:55) version (which was included on the official soundtrack album) is played at a faster tempo than the single version, and features an extended introduction and an instrumental 'breakdown' section, neither of which was included in the single version.

== Personnel ==
- Booker T. Jones – organ
- Steve Cropper – guitar
- Al Jackson Jr. – drums
- Donald "Duck" Dunn – bass

== Charts ==
=== Weekly charts ===
Chart (1969)	Peak position
Australia (Go-Set)	15
Australia (Kent Music Report)	10
Belgium (Ultratop 50 Wallonia)	36
Canada Top Singles (RPM)	8
Canada Adult Contemporary (RPM)	24
Germany (GfK)	31
Ireland (IRMA)	12
Netherlands (Single Top 100)	7
Netherlands (Dutch Top 40)	7
South Africa (Springbok Radio)	1
UK Singles (Official Charts)	4
US Billboard Hot 100	6
US Adult Contemporary (Billboard)	9
US Hot R&B/Hip-Hop Songs (Billboard)	7
US Cash Box Top 100	8

=== Year-end charts ===
Chart (1969)	Position
Australia (Kent Music Report)	56
South Africa (Springbok Radio)	7
UK Singles (Official Charts Company)	37
US Billboard Hot 100	63

== Cover versions ==
- The Clash recorded a notable cover, which they had previously used as a "warm-up" in live performances. The song appears on their 1980 singles compilation album Black Market Clash, and also on their 1994 album Super Black Market Clash. (The Clash's arrangement differs from the original in one major respect – it modulates to D for the 'chorus' section, whereas the MG's version modulates to G.)
- Clash drummer Topper Headon included a version of the song on his 1986 solo debut Waking Up.
- A rendition appears on The Shadows album XXV.
- The Blues Brothers used the song as an intro to their shows in a medley with Otis Redding's "I Can't Turn You Loose". It is featured in The Blues Brothers film as well as in the 1983 mini-album Dancin' wid da Blues Brothers.
- A zydeco-styled cover appears on Buckwheat Zydeco's 1987 album On a Night Like This; the album was nominated for what would later be known as the Grammy Award for Best Contemporary Blues Album.

== Popular culture ==
- The song was played by BBC Radio 1 DJ Johnnie Walker in the early 1970s as the back up music to the weekly BBC chart rundowns. These were published by the British Market Research Bureau on the Tuesday and then broadcast later that day on 247 metres medium wave.
