= The Blues Don't Change =

1977 album by Albert King

Studio album by Albert King
- Recorded: July 1973; March–April 1974
- Studio: Stax, Memphis, Tennessee
- Genre: Soul blues
- Length: 42:53
- Label: Stax
- Producer: Allen Jones; Henry Bush

The Blues Don't Change is an album by American blues musician Albert King. He recorded it at the Stax Records studio in Memphis, Tennessee, in 1973 and 1974. In 1977, Stax released the album with the same songs and running order as The Pinch.

The album is composed of soul- and rhythm and blues-oriented songs written by Mack Rice and others, including a re-working of King's popular 1966 song "Oh, Pretty Woman".

== Reception ==
Professional ratings
Review scores
| Source | Rating |
|---|---|
| AllMusic | 3/5 stars |
| The Penguin Guide to Blues Recordings | 2/4 stars |
| Rolling Stone | 3/5 stars |

Dave Marsh of Rolling Stone called The Pinch, "less blues oriented than his best work." Richie Unterberger of AllMusic, in a 3/5 stars review noted, "These are some of King's most soul-oriented sessions, with contributions from the Memphis Horns and a couple of the MG's." He added that the album focuses more on King's vocals rather than his guitar playing.

== Track listing ==
1. "The Blues Don't Change" (Mack Rice, John Gary Williams) – 5:26
2. "I'm Doing Fine" (Erma Clanton, Earl Randle) – 3:50
3. "Nice to Be Nice (Ain't That Nice)" (Willie Ghee, Rice) – 3:02
4. "Oh, Pretty Woman" (A.C. Williams) – 4:45
5. "King of Kings" (Henry Bush, Allen A. Jones) – 3:28
6. "Feel the Need" (Abrim Tilmon, Johnny Allen) – 3:30
7. "Firing Line (I Don't Play With Your Woman, You Don't Play With Mine)" (Rice) – 3:44
8. "The Pinch Paid Off, Pt. 1" (Permiller Ward, Helen Washington) – 3:42
9. "The Pinch Paid Off, Pt. 2" (Ward, Washington) – 4:50
10. "I Can't Stand the Rain" (Don Bryant, Bernard Miller, Ann Peebles) – 2:52
11. "Ain't It Beautiful" (Bush, Jones, Carl Smith) – 4:01

== Personnel ==
- Albert King – electric guitar, vocals
- Vernon Burch, Bobby Manuel, Michael Toles – guitar
- Lester Snell, Winston Stewart, Marvell Thomas – keyboards
- Donald Dunn, Earl Thomas – bass guitar
- Al Jackson Jr., Willie Hall – drums
- William C. Brown III – background vocals
- Henry Bush – background vocals
- Hot Butter & Soul – background vocals
- The Memphis Horns – horns
