= Willie Hall (drummer) =

American drummer (born 1950)

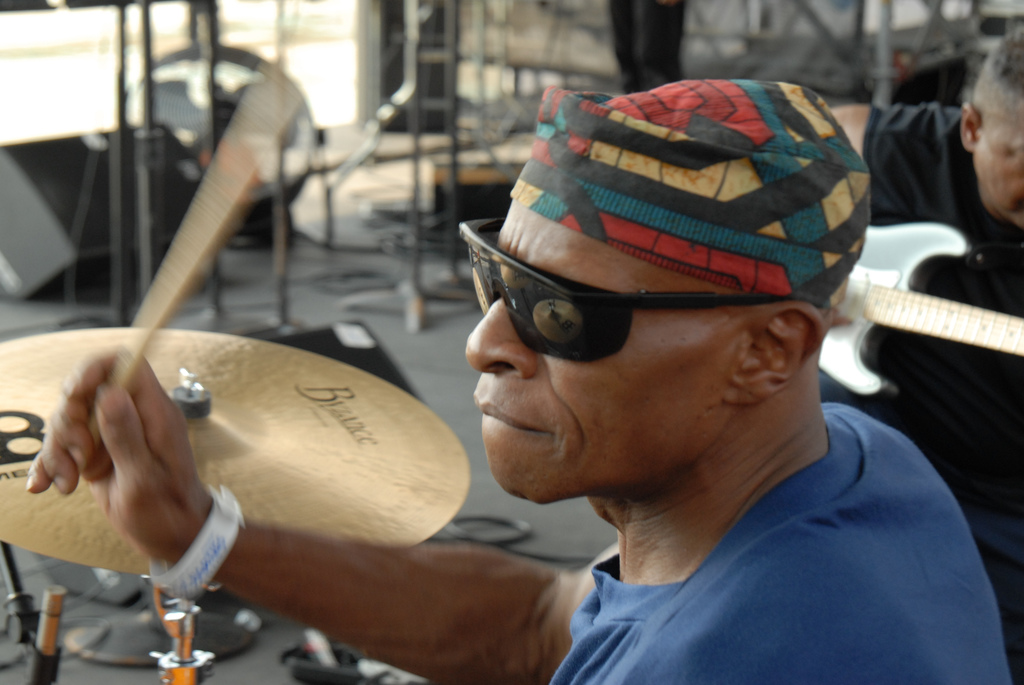
- Hall in 2007

Background information
- Also known as: Willie "Too Big" Hall
- Born: Willie Clarence Hall; August 8, 1950 (age 76); Memphis, Tennessee, U.S.
- Genres: R&B; soul; funk
- Occupation: Musician
- Instruments: Drums; percussion
- Years active: 1965–present
- Label: Stax
- Formerly of: The Bar-Kays; Booker T. & the M.G.'s; The Blues Brothers

Willie Clarence Hall (born August 8, 1950) is an American drummer best known for his work with Isaac Hayes and as a member of the Blues Brothers band.

== Biography ==
Hall began his career as a drummer in 1965, while still in high school. He played with the Bar-Kays and Isaac Hayes' band The Movement. In the 1970s, as part of the Stax-Volt Recording Section Team from 1968 to 1977, Hall backed dozens of major Stax artists on recordings, including The Emotions, Little Milton, Carla and Rufus Thomas, Johnnie Taylor, The Staple Singers, Albert King and Isaac Hayes. Hall produced Hayes' last Stax album, and did percussion on Hayes' albums Hot Buttered Soul and The Isaac Hayes Movement, as well as his Theme from Shaft.

In 1977, Hall was invited to replace drummer Al Jackson, Jr. of Booker T. & the MGs after Jackson died in 1975. Hall recorded the album Universal Language with the group before it officially disbanded. Two years later Hall, along with guitarist Steve "The Colonel" Cropper and bass player Donald "Duck" Dunn became a member of The Blues Brothers, which led to his appearance in the hit movie The Blues Brothers and its sequel Blues Brothers 2000. He also appeared as himself in the 2008 movie Soul Men.

Hall has toured the world and recorded with a variety of artists, including The Blues Brothers, Steve Cropper, Cab Calloway, Aretha Franklin, Ray Charles, KC and the Sunshine Band, Bonnie Raitt, Earl Scruggs, Charlie Daniels Band, Todd Rundgren and Roger McGuinn, among others. He was also a member of The Bo-Keys, a band of highly respected Memphis musicians, including Isaac Hayes' wah-wah guitarist, Charles "Skip" Pitts.

Hall is the father of rapper Gangsta Pat.

== Collaborations ==
With J. Blackfoot

- City Slicker (Sound Town, 1983)
- Physical Attraction (Sound Town, 1984)

With Booker T. & the M.G.'s

- Universal Language (Asylum Records, 1977)

With Randy Brown

- Randy (Chocolate City, 1981)

With Shirley Brown

- Shirley Brown (Arista Records, 1977)
- Intimate Storm (Soundtown Records, 1984)

With Jerry Butler

- The Love We Have, The Love We Had (Mercury Records, 1973)

With Cate Brothers

- In One Eye and Out the Order (Asylum Records, 1976)

With Linda Clifford

- I'm Yours (RSO Records, 1980)

With Steve Cropper

- Playin' My Thang (MCA Records, 1981)

With Yvonne Elliman

- Rising Sun (RSO Records, 1975)

With The Emotions

- Sunshine (Stax Records, 1977)

With Al Green

- Soul Survivor (A&M Records, 1987)

With Carol Grimes

- Carol Grimes (Decca Records, 1976)

With Levon Helm

- Levon Helm (ABC Records, 1978)

With Albert King

- Blues for Elvis – King Does the King's Things (Stax Records, 1970)
- The Blues Don't Change (Stax Records, 1974)

With Tracy Nelson

- Sweet Soul Music (MCA Records, 1975)

With David Porter

- Victim of the Joke? An Opera (Enterprise Records, 1971)
- Sweat & Love (Enterprise Records, 1973)

With Billy Joe Shaver

- When I Get My Wings (Capricorn Records, 1976)

With Mavis Staples

- Mavis Staples (Volt Records, 1969)
- Only for the Lonely (Volt Records, 1970)

With Keith Sykes

- The Way That I Feel (Midland Records, 1977)

With The Manhattan Transfer

- Pastiche (Atlantic Records, 1978)

With Rufus Thomas

- Do the Funky Chicken (Stax Records, 1970)
- Crown Prince of Dance (Stax Records, 1973)

With Tony Joe White

- Eyes (20th Century Records, 1976)
