= Cate Bros. (album) =

Studio album by Cate Brothers
- Released: 1975
- Genre: Rock
- Length: 39:17
- Label: Asylum
- Producer: Steve Cropper

Cate Brothers chronology
Come Back Home (1972)	Cate Bros. (1975)	In One Eye and Out the Other (1976)

Singles from Cate Bros.
- 1. "Union Man" Released: 1975; 2. "Can't Change My Heart" Released: 1975

Cate Bros. is the third studio album by the Fayetteville musicians the Cate Brothers, released in 1975 by Asylum Records. It spawned the hit "Union Man", which peaked at number 24 on the Billboard Hot 100 chart the week of February 7, 1976. and is the highest-charting single they released.

== Reception ==
Professional ratings
Review scores
Source	Rating
AllMusic	4/5 stars
The Virgin Encyclopedia of Popular Music	3/5 stars

Bruce Eder of AllMusic notes that "the record does equal ["Time for Us"] and then some, alternately bursting out with some amazingly funky white soul and haunting balladry in equal measures", believing that "There's not a weak point on the record", highlighting "Can't Change My Heart", "Always Waiting" and "When Love Comes", three songs that the brothers wrote for Huey P. Meaux, closing by saying that "The rest of the record isn't far behind, and the harmonies on "Easy Way Out" are almost worth the price of admission; and the augmentation by Terry Cagle plus [Brooks] Hunnicutt, [Maxine] Willard, and [Julia] Tillman puts the latter track and "Lady Luck" over the top in the vocal department." In Rolling Stone, Bud Scoppa wrote that "You can hear the bar-band experience on every track: the Cates waste no time in getting to the point, and there are plenty of rhythmic gut-grabbers, melodic twists and witty punctuations to hold you once they've got you", adding that "None of the ten songs (all Cate collaborations) are utterly pretty or utterly throbbing; rather they're combinations of the two" and "There's not a dud on the album and the performances match the material (although the band – now a foursome with the addition of drummer/singer Cagle and bassist/singer Albert Singleton – sounds even better onstage, churning with an urgency that belies the players' poker faces", concluding by writing that "Cate Bros. is an uncomplicated, captivating album from the best Southern band to come out of the woods in 1975".

== Track listing ==
Side one
No.	Title	Length
1.	"Time for Us"	3:52
2.	"Union Man"	4:48
3.	"Standin' on a Mountain Top"	4:16
4.	"Always Waiting"	3:11
5.	"When Love Comes"	3:53

Side two
No.	Title	Length
1.	"I Just Wanna Sing"	4:46
2.	"I Can't Change My Heart"	2:48
3.	"Easy Way Out"	3:53
4.	"Lady Luck"	3:53
5.	"Livin' on Dreams"	3:43
Total length:		39:17

== Personnel ==
According to the liner notes:

- Ernie Cate – lead vocal, electric piano, clavinet, synthesizers
- Earl Cate – guitar, lead guitar (1), harmony vocals
- Scott Edwards – bass (1–2, 5–7, 9)
- King Errison – bongos (1, 6)
- Mike Baird – drums (1, 4–5, 7, 10)
- Brooks Hunnicutt – backing vocals (1, 6)
- Julia Tillman – backing vocals (1, 6)
- Maxine Willard – backing vocals (1, 6)
- Eddie Green – drums (2, 6, 9)
- Steve Cropper – guitar (2), producer
- Gary Coleman – percussion (2), vibraphone (3, 8), bells (8)
- David Foster – clavinet (3), piano (3)
- Klaus Voormann – bass (3–4)
- Levon Helm – drums (3)
- Terry Cagle – harmony vocals (3)
- Nigel Olsson – drums (8)
- Leland Sklar – bass (8)
- William "Smithy" Smith – organ (5, 8, 10)

== Charts ==
=== Album ===
Chart (1976)	Peak position
US Billboard 200	158

=== Singles ===
==== "Union Man" ====
Chart (1976)	Peak position
New Zealand (Recorded Music NZ)	28
US Billboard Hot 100	24
US Hot R&B/Hip-Hop Songs (Billboard)	96

==== "Can't Change My Heart" ====
Chart (1976)	Peak position
US Billboard Hot 100	91
