= Bobby Manuel =

American guitarist (born 1945)

- Also known as: Dale Yard
- Born: November 13, 1945 (age 80)
- Genres: Soul; blues
- Occupations: Musician; studio and production company operator; music engineer; producer; songwriter
- Instrument: Guitar
- Labels: Stax Records, HighStacks

Bobby Manuel (born November 13, 1945) is an American guitarist. In the early 1960s he was the lead guitarist of the local band the Memphis Blazers. He was hired by Stax Records in the late 1960s as an engineer and also quickly began doing studio work as a guitarist, becoming one of the company's most dependable and oft-used session players.

Manuel's credits include playing with some notable musicians, including Albert King, Rufus Thomas, Luther Ingram, and Isaac Hayes.

Though Manuel's roles at Stax centered on engineering and playing guitar, he also co-wrote songs, produced artists such as Stefan, Ben Atkins, and Annette Thomas, and he released a one-off novelty country record under the pseudonym Dale Yard. In 1973, he subbed for Steve Cropper as a member of The MG's, alongside Carson Whitsett and Stax regulars Al Jackson, Jr. and Duck Dunn.

In 1976, Manuel produced the number-one hit "Disco Duck" by Memphis dee-jay Rick Dees and His Cast of Idiots. It was initially released by former Stax co-owner Estelle Axton's Fretone label.

After the demise of Stax Records, Manuel and Stax founder Jim Stewart operated Daily Planet, a studio and production company in Memphis, Tennessee. Shirley Brown was among its most notable signings. He later ran his own label, HighStacks (named to recall the glory of former Memphis R&B labels, Hi Records and Stax).

In 2004, Manuel organized and led a group of Memphis All-Stars with guest appearances by Marvell Thomas and Steve Cropper to celebrate the opening of the Stax Museum of American Soul Music, backing such as Isaac Hayes, Mavis Staples, Eddie Floyd, William Bell, Solomon Burke, and Al Green who performed in honor of the label.
