= Pastiche (disambiguation) =

Pastiche is a literary or other artistic genre.

Pastiche may also refer to:

- Pastiche (album), a 1978 album by The Manhattan Transfer
- Pastiche (band), a British jazz vocal trio, best known for the theme song of Sonic the Hedgehog CD in the American soundtrack
- Pastiche, a fictional language in The Languages of Pao
- Nut roll
