= Universal Language (Booker T. & the M.G.'s album) =

Studio album by Booker T. & the M.G.'s
- Released: 1977
- Recorded: 1977
- Studio: Clover, Hollywood, California
- Genre: Soul, instrumental rock
- Length: 32:59
- Label: Asylum; 7E 1093
- Producer: Booker T. & the M.G.'s; co-produced with Tom Dowd on "Space Nuts"

Booker T. & the M.G.'s chronology
| The MGs (1973) | Universal Language (1977) | That's the Way It Should Be (1994) |

Universal Language is a 1977 album by the American band Booker T. & the M.G.'s. The album was recorded for Asylum Records, following the demise of Stax Records, of which the M.G.'s were an integral element, in 1975.

The album was dedicated to M.G.'s drummer Al Jackson, Jr., who was murdered in 1975; the remaining members recruited Willie Hall to replace him on this album. The group would not record another album for seventeen years, returning in 1994 with That's the Way It Should Be.

== Reception ==
Professional ratings
Review scores
| Source | Rating |
|---|---|
| AllMusic | 2/5 stars |
| The Encyclopedia of Popular Music | 1/5 stars |
| The Rolling Stone Record Guide | 1/5 stars |

The AllMusic retrospective review awarded the album 2 stars.

== Track listing ==
All songs written by Cropper, Dunn, and Jones, except where noted

Side one

1. "Sticky Stuff" – 4:09
2. "Grab Bag" – 4:32
3. "Space Nuts" – 3:27
4. "Love Wheels" – 3:38
5. "Motocross" – 4:33

Side two

1. "Last Tango in Memphis" – 5:26
2. "MG's Salsa" – 5:27
3. "Tie Stick" (Cropper, Dunn, Jones, Johnny Stevenson) – 5:01
4. "Reincarnation" – 5:12

== Personnel ==
Booker T. & the M.G.s

- Booker T. Jones – keyboards
- Steve Cropper – guitar
- Donald Dunn – bass guitar
- Willie Hall – drums

Technical

- Austin Godsey, Toby Scott – engineers
- Tony Lane – art direction
- Jonathan Seay – cover
