= McLemore Avenue =

Studio album by Booker T. & the M.G.'s
- Released: April 1970
- Recorded: 1969
- Studios: Stax, Memphis, and Wally Heider, Los Angeles
- Genres: Southern soul, instrumental rock, progressive soul
- Length: 38:12
- Labels: Stax; STS-2027
- Producers: Booker T. & the M.G.'s

Booker T. & the M.G.'s chronology
The Booker T. Set (1969)	McLemore Avenue (1970)	Melting Pot (1971)

Professional ratings
Review scores
Source	Rating
AllMusic	link

McLemore Avenue is the tenth studio album by the American southern soul group Booker T. & the M.G.s, consisting entirely of mostly instrumental versions of songs from the Beatles' album Abbey Road (released only months earlier, in September 1969). The title and cover are an homage to the Beatles album, 926 East McLemore Avenue being the address of the Stax Studios in Memphis, as Abbey Road was for London’s EMI Studios, which were soon renamed Abbey Road Studios. As a nod to Abbey Road's medley, most of the M.G.s' selections are arranged into their own medleys. ("Something" was released as a single and reached number 76 in the US). The album itself peaked at No. 107 in the US.

Booker T. Jones said, "I was in California when I heard Abbey Road, and I thought it was incredibly courageous of The Beatles to drop their format and move out musically like they did. To push the limit like that and reinvent themselves when they had no need to do that. They were the top band in the world but they still reinvented themselves. The music was just incredible so I felt I needed to pay tribute to it."

== Track listing ==
All songs written by Lennon–McCartney except "Here Comes the Sun" and "Something", by George Harrison

Side one

1. Medley: "Golden Slumbers", "Carry That Weight", "The End" (with vocals), "Here Comes the Sun", "Come Together" (with incidental vocals) – 15:48
2. "Something" – 4:09

Side two

1. Medley: "Because", "You Never Give Me Your Money" – 7:26
2. Medley: "Sun King", "Mean Mr. Mustard", "Polythene Pam", "She Came In Through the Bathroom Window", "I Want You (She's So Heavy)" – 10:40

2011 Stax Remasters bonus tracks

5. "You Can't Do That" – 2:47 (Originally released on Play the "Hip Hits")
6. "Day Tripper" – 2:52 (Originally released on Play the "Hip Hits")
7. "Michelle" – 2:52 (Originally released on The Booker T. Set)
8. "Eleanor Rigby" – 3:41 (Originally released on Soul Limbo)
9. "Lady Madonna" – 3:35 (Originally released on The Booker T. Set)
10. "You Can't Do That" (alternate take) – 3:08

It was also released digitally in a lossless and high quality version at 88.2 kHz and 24 bit.

== Personnel ==
Booker T. & the M.G.s

- Booker T. Jones – organ, piano, keyboards, guitar
- Steve Cropper – guitar
- Donald Dunn – bass guitar
- Al Jackson Jr. – drums

Production credits

- Produced and arranged by Booker T. & the M.G.'s
- Engineers – Ron Capone, Gordon Rudd, Rik Pekkonen, Terry Manning
- Remix engineers – Steve Cropper, John Fry
- Photography – Joel Brodsky
- Art direction – The Graffiteria/David Krieger
- Art supervision – Herb Kole

== Charts ==
Chart (1970)	Peak position
US Billboard Top LPs	107
