= The Booker T. Set =

Studio album by Booker T. & the M.G.'s
- Released: May 1969
- Recorded: 1969
- Studio: Stax, Memphis
- Genre: R&B, instrumental rock
- Length: 34:13
- Label: Stax
- Producer: Booker T. & the M.G.'s

Booker T. & the M.G.'s chronology
Up Tight (1969)	The Booker T. Set (1969)	McLemore Avenue (1970)

Professional ratings
Review scores
Source	Rating
AllMusic	3/5 stars

The Booker T. Set is a 1969 studio album by the Southern soul band Booker T. & the M.G.'s. Other than one original track, it consists mostly of instrumental covers of popular songs from the previous several years. Multiple genres of music are covered, including folk, soul, jazz, funk, and rock.

== Chart performance ==
The album peaked at No. 53, during an eighteen-week run on the chart.

== Track listing ==
Side one

1. "The Horse" (Jesse James)
2. "Love Child" (R. Dean Taylor, Deke Richards, Pam Sawyer, Frank Wilson, Henry Cosby)
3. "Sing a Simple Song" (Sly Stone)
4. "Lady Madonna" (John Lennon, Paul McCartney)
5. "Mrs. Robinson" (Paul Simon)

Side two

1. "This Guy's in Love with You" (Burt Bacharach, Hal David)
2. "Light My Fire" (Robby Krieger, Jim Morrison, Ray Manzarek, John Densmore)
3. "Michelle" (John Lennon, Paul McCartney)
4. "You're All I Need to Get By" (Nickolas Ashford, Valerie Simpson)
5. "I've Never Found a Girl (To Love Me Like You Do)" (Eddie Floyd, Booker T. Jones, Alvertis Isbell)
6. "It's Your Thing" (O'Kelly Isley, Ronald Isley, Rudolph Isley)

== Personnel ==
Booker T. & the M.G.s

- Booker T. Jones - Hammond organ, Hohner clavinet, piano, vibraphone
- Steve Cropper - electric guitar, sitar
- Donald Dunn - bass guitar
- Al Jackson Jr. - drums, tambourine

== Charts ==
Chart (1969)	Peak position
US Billboard Top LPs	53
