= In the Christmas Spirit =

1966 studio album by Booker T. & the M.G.'s

Studio album by Booker T. & the M.G.s
- Released: November 1966
- Recorded: 1966
- Studio: Stax Recording Studio, Memphis, Tennessee
- Genre: Christmas music, Southern soul, instrumental rock
- Length: 34:09
- Label: Stax/Atlantic
- Producer: Jim Stewart

Booker T. & the M.G.s chronology
And Now! (1966)	In the Christmas Spirit (1966)	Hip Hug-Her (1967)

Professional ratings
Review scores
Source	Rating
Allmusic	link

In the Christmas Spirit is the fourth album by the R&B/soul band Booker T. & the M.G.'s, released in November 1966. It charted 9 weeks peaking at #13 on Billboard's Best Bets For Christmas album chart December 2, 1967. The album features instrumental versions of traditional Christmas carols and songs.

== Track listing ==
Side one

1. "Jingle Bells" (James Lord Pierpont)
2. "Santa Claus Is Coming to Town" (J. Fred Coots, Haven Gillespie)
3. "Winter Wonderland" (Felix Bernard, Richard Bernhard Smith)
4. "White Christmas" (Irving Berlin)
5. "The Christmas Song" (Mel Tormé, Robert Wells)
6. "Silver Bells" (Ray Evans, Jay Livingston)

Side two

1. "Merry Christmas Baby" (Lou Baxter, Johnny Moore)
2. "Blue Christmas (Bill Hayes, Jay Johnson)
3. "Sweet Little Jesus Boy" (Bob MacGimsey)
4. "Silent Night" (Franz Xaver Gruber, Joseph Mohr)
5. "We Three Kings" (John Henry Hopkins Jr.)
6. "We Wish You a Merry Christmas" (Traditional)

== Personnel ==
Booker T. & the M.G.s

- Booker T. Jones - Hammond organ, piano, vibraphone
- Steve Cropper - guitar, bass guitar on "White Christmas"
- Donald Dunn - bass guitar, claves on "White Christmas"
- Al Jackson Jr. - drums, percussion
