= Melting Pot (Booker T album) =

Studio album by Booker T. & the M.G.'s
- Released: January 1971
- Recorded: 1970
- Studios: Stax, Memphis, and the Record Plant, NYC
- Genres: R&B, instrumental rock
- Length: 40:10
- Labels: Stax; STS-2035
- Producers: Booker T. & the M.G.'s

Booker T. & the M.G.'s chronology
McLemore Avenue (1970)	Melting Pot (1971)	The MG's (1973)

Singles from Melting Pot
- 1. "Melting Pot / Kinda Easy Like" Released: 1971

Melting Pot is a 1971 studio album recorded by Booker T. & the M.G.'s for Stax Records. It is the last album to feature the group's classic lineup of Jones, Cropper, Dunn, and Jackson and the first of their albums to contain longer, jam-oriented compositions.

== Background ==
By 1970, bandleader/keyboardist Booker T. Jones had become estranged from Stax, as he protested the changing atmosphere under the leadership of executive Al Bell. Jones left Memphis, Tennessee, where Stax was headquartered, and moved to California while guitarist Steve Cropper, also dissatisfied with the new Stax atmosphere, opened his own studio in Memphis, spending less and less time at the Stax studio. Melting Pot was recorded in New York City, between M.G.'s gigs, as Jones refused to record in Memphis and wanted the band to create a different sound for the new album.

The album's title track was edited for length and issued by Stax as a single in spring 1971. "Melting Pot" peaked at number 45 on the Billboard Hot 100 in the United States and at number 21 on the Billboard R&B singles chart.

== Critical reception ==
Professional ratings
Review scores
Source	Rating
AllMusic	4.5/5 stars
Christgau's Record Guide	B+
The Village Voice	A−

The review in Rolling Stone was very positive, concluding in its final paragraph: "Altogether, as an album, it works really well, with the group's customary taste and precision balanced against a new looseness and a return to earlier, funky playing patterns. That's more than enough to make it the best Booker T. album in some time, the Memphis Gas of the Year, and a Major Rock Event for everyone."

Village Voice critic Robert Christgau wrote: "Here the Memphis motorvators surpass the somewhat boxy rhythms that have limited all their albums as albums except for Uptight, which had vocals. Al Jackson's solidity, a linchpin of rock drumming as surely as Keith Moon's blastoffs and Charlie Watts's steady economy, is unshaken by the shifts the arrangements demand, and his deftness permits a more flexible concept in which Booker lays back some on organ and Steve Cropper gets more melodic input. A Vegas-jazz ('L.A. Jazz Song' is a title) boop-de-doo chorus upsets the balance of side two pretty badly, but for the first twenty minutes this is unbelievably smooth without ever turning slick."

== Track listing ==
All songs written by Booker T. Jones, Steve Cropper, Donald "Duck" Dunn, and Al Jackson Jr. except "Kinda Easy Like", by Jones, Cropper, Jackson, and Lewis Steinberg.

Side one

1. "Melting Pot" – 8:15
2. "Back Home" – 4:40
3. "Chicken Pox" – 3:26
4. "Fuquawi" – 3:40

Side two

1. "Kinda Easy Like" – 8:43
2. "Hi Ride" – 2:36
3. "L.A. Jazz Song" – 4:18
4. "Sunny Monday" – 4:35

== Personnel ==
Booker T. & the M.G.s

- Booker T. Jones – keyboards
- Steve Cropper – guitar
- Donald Dunn – bass guitar
- Al Jackson Jr. – drums

Additional personnel

- The Pepper Singers – background vocals

Production credits

- Recording engineers – Ron Capone, Gordon Rudd, Rik Pekkonen, Shelly Yakus, Jay Messina, Steve Cropper
- Remix engineer – Steve Cropper
- Cover photographer – George Rodriguez
- Art director – The Graffiteria/Stan Hochstadt
- Art supervisor – Herb Kole, Larry Shaw

== Charts ==
Year	Album	Chart positions		
Year	Album	US	US R&B	Jazz Albums
1971	Melting Pot	43	2	5

=== Singles ===
Year	Single	Chart positions		
Year	Single	US	US R&B	US Dance
1971	"Melting Pot"	45	21	—

== Samples ==
- "Melting Pot"
  - "Another Victory" by Big Daddy Kane on his album It's a Big Daddy Thing
- "Chicken Pox"
  - "Silence of the Lambs" by Showbiz and A.G. on their album Runaway Slave
