= Hip Hug-Her =

Studio album by Booker T. & the M.G.'s
- Released: June 1967
- Recorded: February 9, 1967; April 26, 1967
- Studios: Stax Recording Studio, Memphis
- Genre: Southern soul
- Length: 30:26
- Label: Stax/Atlantic
- Producer: Jim Stewart

Booker T. & the M.G.'s chronology
In the Christmas Spirit (1966)	Hip Hug-Her (1967)	Back to Back (1967)

Singles from Groovin'
- 1. "Groovin'" Released: June 12, 1967

Professional ratings
Review scores
Source	Rating
Allmusic	4/5 stars

Hip Hug-Her is the fifth studio album by the Southern soul band Booker T. & the M.G.'s, released on Stax Records in June 1967. The title track was the band's most successful single since their 1962 debut, "Green Onions", reaching #37 on the Billboard Hot 100 in 1967, and #6 on Billboard's R&B chart. Their cover of the Young Rascals song "Groovin'" was also a hit (number 10 R&B, number 21 pop). The album was their last to be produced by Stax co-founder Jim Stewart, because the band started to produce themselves starting with Doin' Our Thing. The title track "Hip Hug-Her" is featured during the opening credits of the feature film Barfly (1987) with Mickey Rourke and Faye Dunaway.

== Track listing ==
All tracks composed by Booker T & the MGs (Steve Cropper, Donald Dunn, Al Jackson Jr., Booker T. Jones), except where noted.

Side one

1. "Hip Hug-Her" – 2:22
2. "Soul Sanction" – 2:30
3. "Get Ready" (William Robinson) – 2:45
4. "More" (Riz Ortolani, Nino Oliviero, Marcello Ciorciolini, Norman Newell) – 2:55
5. "Double or Nothing" – 2:51
6. "Carnaby St." – 2:14

Side two

1. "Slim Jenkins' Place" – 2:25
2. "Pigmy" (Mel Brown, Billy Larkin, Hank Swarn) – 3:55
3. "Groovin'" (Eddie Brigati, Felix Cavaliere) – 2:40
4. "Booker's Notion" – 2:25
5. "Sunny" (Bobby Hebb) – 3:24

"Slim Jenkins' Place" was originally titled "Slim Jenkins' Joint".

== Personnel ==
Booker T. & the M.G.s

- Booker T. Jones - Hammond organ, piano
- Steve Cropper - guitar, piano on "Groovin'", claves on "Booker's Notion"
- Donald Dunn - bass guitar
- Al Jackson Jr. - drums, percussion

Technical

- Loring Eutemey - cover design
- George Rosenblatt - cover photography

== Charts ==
Chart (1967)	Peak position
US Top Pop Albums	35
US Top R&B Albums	4

Singles

Year	Song	Chart	Peak position
1967	"Groovin'"	US Hot 100	21
1967	"Groovin'"	US Hot R&B Singles	10
1967	"Slim Jenkin's Place"	US Hot R&B Singles	70
