= And Now! =

Studio album by Booker T. & the M.G.'s
- Released: November 1966
- Recorded: 1966
- Studio: Stax Recording Studio, Memphis
- Genre: R&B, instrumental rock
- Length: 36:26
- Label: Stax/Atlantic
- Producer: Jim Stewart

Booker T. & the M.G.'s chronology
Soul Dressing (1965)	And Now! (1966)	In the Christmas Spirit (1966)

Professional ratings
Review scores
Source	Rating
Allmusic	3/5 stars

And Now! is the third studio album by the Southern soul band Booker T. & the M.G.'s, released in November 1966. It is notable as the first M.G.'s album featuring bassist Duck Dunn on every track. “My Sweet Potato” was the only track released as a single, with “Booker-Loo” (not included on the album) as its B-side. “Summertime” was released in 1967 as the B-side to the song “Hip Hug-Her”.

== Track listing ==
=== Side one ===
1. “My Sweet Potato” (Steve Cropper, Booker T. Jones, Al Jackson Jr.) – 2:47
2. “Jericho” (Traditional; arranged by Booker T & the MGs) – 2:37
3. “No Matter What Shape (Your Stomach's In)” (Granville "Sascha" Burland) – 3:01
4. “One Mint Julep” (Rudy Toombs) – 3:05
5. “In the Midnight Hour” (Steve Cropper, Wilson Pickett) – 2:58
6. “Summertime” (George Gershwin, Ira Gershwin, Dubose Heyward) – 4:41

=== Side two ===
1. “Working in the Coal Mine” (Lee Dorsey, Allen Toussaint) – 2:42
2. “Don't Mess up a Good Thing” (Oliver Sain) – 2:44
3. “Think” (Lowman Pauling) – 2:58
4. “Taboo” (Margarita Lecuona) – 4:25
5. “Soul Jam” (Cropper, Donald "Duck" Dunn, Jones, Jackson Jr.) – 3:05
6. “Sentimental Journey” (Les Brown, Bud Green, Ben Homer) – 3:13

== Personnel ==
Booker T. & the M.G.s

- Booker T. Jones – "plunk", piano, organ, guitar
- Steve Cropper – "strum", guitar, electric bass on "My Sweet Potato"
- Donald Dunn – "thump", bass guitar, claves on "My Sweet Potato"
- Al Jackson Jr. – "boom", drums

Technical

- Ronnie "Angel" Stoots – cover design
