= That's the Way It Should Be =

Studio album by Booker T. & the M.G.'s
- Released: May 24, 1994
- Recorded: 1994
- Genres: Southern soul, instrumental rock
- Length: 37:10
- Labels: Columbia, Acadia
- Producers: Booker T. Jones, Steve Cropper

Booker T. & the M.G.'s chronology
Universal Language (1977)	That's the Way It Should Be (1994)

Professional ratings
Review scores
Source	Rating
Allmusic	3/5 stars

That's the Way It Should Be is the thirteenth and final studio album by Booker T. & the M.G.'s, released on May 24, 1994. The track "Cruisin'" won the Grammy Award for Best Pop Instrumental Performance. It features drummer Steve Jordan on 9 of the albums tracks whilst James Gadson played on the remaining three.

== Track listing ==
1. "Slip Slidin'" (Steve Cropper, Booker T. Jones, Steve Jordan)
2. "Mo' Greens" (Steve Cropper, Booker T. Jones, Steve Jordan)
3. "Gotta Serve Somebody" (Bob Dylan)
4. "Let's Wait a While" (Melanie Andrews, James Harris III, Janet Jackson, Terry Lewis)
5. "That's the Way It Should Be" (Steve Cropper, Donald "Duck" Dunn, Booker T. Jones, Steve Jordan)
6. "Just My Imagination (Running Away with Me)" (Barrett Strong, Norman Whitfield)
7. "Camel Ride" (Steve Cropper, Donald "Duck" Dunn, Booker T. Jones, Steve Jordan)
8. "Have a Heart" (Bonnie Hayes)
9. "Cruisin'" (Steve Cropper, Donald "Duck" Dunn, Anton Fig, Booker T. Jones)
10. "I Can't Stand the Rain" (Don Bryant, Bernard Miller, Ann Peebles)
11. "Sarasota Sunset" (Steve Cropper, Donald "Duck" Dunn, Anton Fig, Booker T. Jones)
12. "I Still Haven't Found What I'm Looking For" (Bono, Adam Clayton, The Edge, Larry Mullen, Jr.)

== Personnel ==
Booker T. & the M.G.s

- Booker T. Jones – keyboards
- Steve Cropper – guitar
- Donald Dunn – bass guitar
- Steve Jordan – drums on tracks 1–3, 5–7 and 9–11

with:

- James Gadson – drums on tracks 4, 8 and 12
