= Hang 'Em High (composition) =

Single by Booker T. & the M.G.'s

from the album Soul Limbo
- B-side: "Over Easy"
- Released: October 1968
- Recorded: 1968
- Studio: Stax Recording Studio, Memphis, Tennessee
- Genre: Soul
- Length: 3:53
- Label: Stax
- Songwriter: Dominic Frontiere
- Producers: Booker T. & the M.G.'s

Booker T. & the M.G.'s singles chronology
"Soul Limbo" (1968)	"Hang 'Em High" (1968)	"Time Is Tight" (1969)

"Hang 'Em High" is a musical theme composed by Dominic Frontiere for the soundtrack of the 1968 film of the same name. Though it was first covered by Hugo Montenegro, whose orchestra recorded a full album of music from the film, the tune became a hit in an R&B instrumental version by Booker T. & the M.G.'s that charted #9 Pop and #35 R&B. It was also covered by Wall of Voodoo in a medley with "The Good, the Bad and the Ugly"; this recording appeared as a non-album B-side to their single "Ring of Fire", where it is erroneously credited as composed by Ennio Morricone instead of Frontiere.
