= Donald "Duck" Dunn =

American bass guitarist (1941–2012)

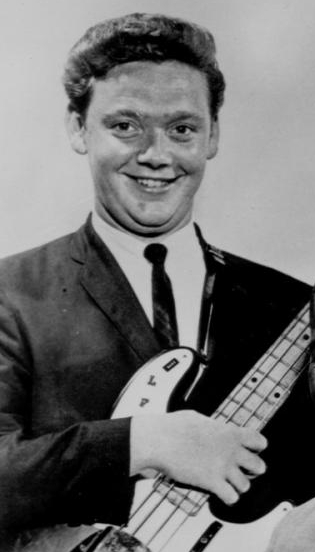
- Dunn in 1967

Background information
- Also known as: Duck
- Born: Donald Dunn; November 24, 1941; Memphis, Tennessee, U.S.
- Died: May 13, 2012 (aged 70) Tokyo, Japan
- Genres: Memphis soul; soul music; R&B; southern soul
- Occupations: Musician; songwriter; producer
- Instrument: Bass guitar
- Years active: 1960–2012
- Member of: The Blues Brothers
- Formerly of: Booker T. & the M.G.'s
- Website: duckdunn.com

Donald "Duck" Dunn (November 24, 1941 – May 13, 2012) was an American bass guitarist, session musician, record producer, and songwriter. Dunn was notable for his 1960s recordings with Booker T. & the M.G.'s and as a session bassist for Stax Records. At Stax, Dunn played on thousands of records, including hits by Otis Redding, Sam & Dave, Rufus Thomas, Carla Thomas, William Bell, Eddie Floyd, Johnnie Taylor, Albert King, Bill Withers, Elvis Presley, and many others. In 1992, he was inducted in the Rock and Roll Hall of Fame as a member of Booker T. & the M.G.'s. In 2017, he was ranked 40th on Bass Player magazine's list of "The 100 Greatest Bass Players of All Time".

== Early life ==
Dunn was born in Memphis, Tennessee. His father nicknamed him "Duck" after the Disney character Donald Duck. Dunn grew up playing sports and riding his bike with another future professional musician, Steve Cropper.

== Career ==
=== 1960s: First bands ===
After Cropper began playing guitar with their friend Charlie Freeman, Dunn decided to learn the bass guitar. Eventually, along with drummer Terry Johnson, the four became the Royal Spades. The Messick High School group added keyboardist Jerry Lee "Smoochy" Smith, singer Ronnie Angel (also known as Stoots), and a budding young horn section in baritone saxophone player Don Nix, tenor saxophone player Charles "Packy" Axton, and trumpeter (and future co-founder of the Memphis Horns) Wayne Jackson.

Cropper has noted how the self-taught Dunn started out playing along with records, filling in what he thought should be there. "That's why Duck Dunn's bass lines are very unique," Cropper said, "They're not locked into somebody's schoolbook somewhere". Axton's mother, Estelle, and her brother Jim Stewart owned Satellite Records and signed the band, who had a national hit with "Last Night" in 1961 under their new name, the "Mar-Keys".

Booker T. and the M.G.'s was founded by Cropper and Booker T. Jones in 1962, with the drummer Al Jackson, Jr. The original bassist, on early hits such as "Green Onions", was Lewie Steinberg; Dunn replaced him in 1965.

=== Late 1960s–1970s: Session musician ===
Stax Records became known for the sound of Booker T & the MG's, the Memphis Horns and the Mar-Keys. The MG's and Dunn's bass lines on songs like Otis Redding's "Respect" and "I Can't Turn You Loose", Sam & Dave's "Hold On, I'm Comin'", and Albert King's "Born Under a Bad Sign" influenced R&B musicians.

As an instrumental group, they continued to experiment with the album McLemore Avenue (their reworking of the Beatles' Abbey Road) and on their final album, Melting Pot (1971), which featured bass lines that to this day inspire hip-hop artists. In the 1970s, Jones and Cropper left Stax, but Dunn and Jackson stayed with the label. Dunn worked with Elvis Presley on his 1973 RCA Album Raised on Rock.

Booker T. and the MG's had performed in concert and jammed in the studio with CCR in the past, and Dunn in particular had become friends with the band members. Dunn worked with Creedence Clearwater Revival (CCR)'s album Willy and the Poor Boys, and Dunn and Stu Cook joined Doug Clifford's album " Cosmo".

=== 1980s–2000s ===
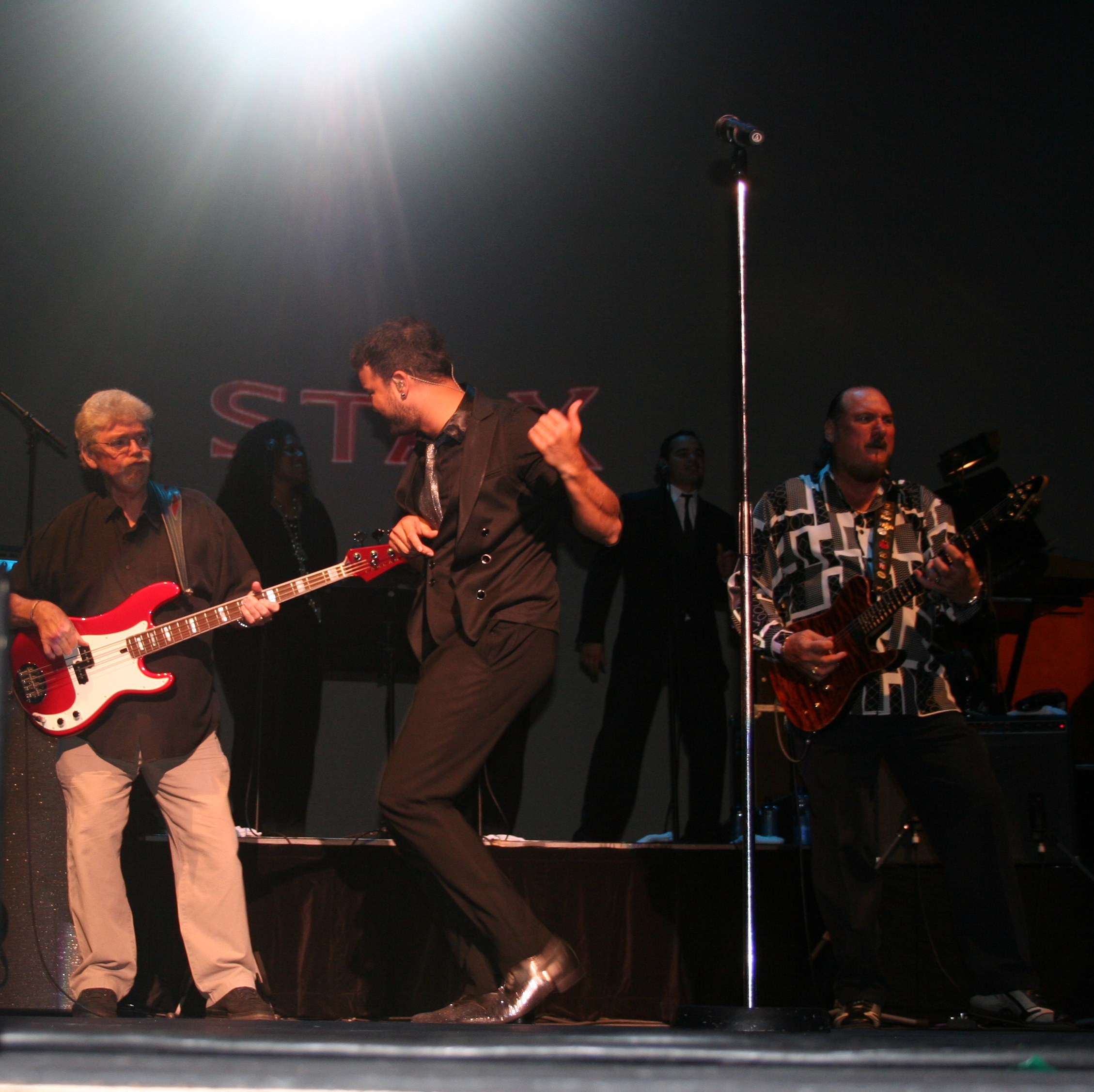
Dunn (left), Guy Sebastian (center) and Steve Cropper (right) on tour in Australia in 2008 with the Memphis Tour

Dunn went on to play for Muddy Waters, Freddie King, Jerry Lee Lewis, Eric Clapton, Paul Butterfield, Mike Bloomfield, and Rod Stewart. He was the featured bass player on the single "Stop Draggin' My Heart Around", by Stevie Nicks and Tom Petty, from Nicks's debut solo album Bella Donna (1981), and on other tracks by Petty between 1976 and 1981. He reunited with Cropper as a member of Levon Helm's RCO All Stars and also displayed his quirky Southern humor making two movies with Cropper, former Stax drummer Willie Hall, and Dan Aykroyd as a member of the Blues Brothers band. Dunn was the bassist in Eric Clapton's band for Clapton's appearance at Live Aid in 1985.

Dunn played himself in the 1980 feature The Blues Brothers, where he famously uttered the line, "We had a band powerful enough to turn goat piss into gasoline!" and was frequently shown smoking a pipe while playing. He appeared in the 1998 sequel Blues Brothers 2000, again as himself. Dunn & the MGs were the house band for Bob Dylan's concert celebrating Dylan's 30th anniversary in the music business at Madison Square Garden playing behind Dylan, George Harrison, Eric Clapton, Tom Petty, Stevie Wonder, Sinéad O'Connor, Eddie Vedder, and Neil Young, who recruited the MGs to tour with him and recorded with Dunn several times since.

In the 2000s, Dunn was in semi-retirement, but still performed occasionally with Booker T. & the MG's at clubs and music festivals.

In June 2004, Dunn, Cropper, and Jones served as the house band for Eric Clapton's Crossroads Guitar Festival. The group backed such guitarists as Joe Walsh and David Hidalgo on the main stage at the Cotton Bowl in Dallas, Texas.

In 2008, Dunn worked with the Australian soul singer Guy Sebastian touring for The Memphis Album. Dunn and Cropper arrived in Australia on February 20, 2008, to be Sebastian's backing band for an 18-date concert tour, the Memphis Tour.

Dunn is credited with performing on a version of the standard "I Ain't Got Nobody" with Jones, Cropper and Michel Gondry in Gondry's 2008 film Be Kind Rewind.

== Personal life ==
Dunn was married to his wife, June, until his death. They had two sons, Mike and Jeff, and a grandson, Michael.

== Death ==
On the morning of May 13, 2012, Dunn died in his sleep at age 70 after finishing his fifth double show at the Blue Note nightclub in Tokyo with Cropper the night before. He had been in Japan as part of an ongoing tour with Cropper and Eddie Floyd.

== Musical equipment ==
When Dunn was 16, he bought his first bass guitar, a Kay 162 electric bass. About a year later, he acquired his first Fender Precision Bass, with sunburst body, rosewood fingerboard, and gold anodized pickguard. He lost that bass when Otis Redding and members of the Bar-Kays were killed in a plane crash, and the bass was on loan to bassist James Alexander. Dunn's second Fender bass was a 1959 Fender Precision Bass, with sunburst body, one-piece maple neck and gold anodized pickguard; he owned it until his death. Throughout his life, Dunn believed this was a 1958 model, but after his death, his son Jeff had work done on it, and the neck was inscribed "4-59," putting the date definitively as 1959. During the 1960s, he used a nearly identical 1959 model, but it was outfitted with a rosewood fretboard. He was an avid user of thick La Bella flatwound strings, similar to what bassist James Jamerson used.

While filming The Blues Brothers, Dunn used a sunburst early '70s Fender Precision bass with a rosewood fretboard and a "tortoiseshell" pickguard. He also used a red 1966 Precision in some of the scenes, a bass stamped "Demo" on the back, which was later fitted with a late '60s Jazz Bass neck. It was a combination that was popular with other top-level players, including Carl Radle, and Billy Cox. This "Jazzision" became the basis for a Skyline Series signature bass made by the Chicago bass company Lakland nearly 20 years later. Dunn also used a white late-70s Precision Bass when performing Minnie the Moocher with Cab Calloway.

In 1980, with the popular Blues Brothers Band touring regularly, Fender gave Dunn a new bass to try, the company's first active electronics equipped model, the Precision Bass Special. His bass (serial number E0xx009) was finished in his favorite color, Candy Apple Red, with a matching headstock, and featured a one-piece maple neck, and gold hardware. He played this bass briefly, before gifting it to a friend.

In the mid-1980s, after nearly three decades, Dunn switched from Fender instruments, and became an endorser for Mississippi-based Peavey. He played their "Dyna Bass" model – finished in his favorite red – on stage and in the studio for a number of years. Over the decades, he was given various basses by friends and admirers, which included models by Travis Bean, Rickenbacker, Gibson, custom builders, and others, but his everyday instrument was always his Precision.

In 1998, Dunn collaborated with Fender to produce a signature Precision Bass: a candy apple red model based on the late 1950s style, with a gold anodized pickguard, split coil humbucking pickup, maple neck, and vintage hardware for a limited production of 200 instruments. The Bass was offered only for a limited time. The Dunn family has serial numbers XXX001, XXX002, and XXX003 in their collection. #002 is currently on display at the Hard Rock Cafe in Orlando, Florida.

Fellow studio legend Bob Glaub introduced Dunn to the people at Lakland, and based on his "Jazzision" bass from the Blues Brothers movie, the company's Duck Dunn signature model was released (later available as the model 44-64 Custom). Dunn played his final shows on one of these basses, and that bass remains with his son Jeff, complete with sweat streaks from his final moments of playing. Some of Dunn's basses are displayed at Hard Rock Cafe locations, some are in museums (like the Rock & Roll Hall of Fame in Cleveland), and others are in the hands of private collectors.

Over the years, Dunn played through an Ampeg Portaflex, or "Fliptop", B-15 combo (so named for its head that flipped over to store in the cabinet), as well as a Kustom 200 stack, and a Fender rig. He is best known for his use of an Ampeg SVT head and the company's matching 8×10" cabinet through his endorsement deal with Ampeg.

== Collaborations ==
With The Rance Allen Group

- A Soulful Experience (Truth Records, 1975)

With Joan Baez

- Gulf Winds (A&M Records, 1976)
- Blowin' Away (Portrait Records, 1977)

With William Bell

- The Soul of a Bell (Stax Records, 1967)
- Bound to Happen (Stax Records, 1969)
- Relating (Stax Records, 1974)

With David Blue

- Cupid's Arrow (Asylum Records, 1976)

With Booker T. & the M.G.'s

- And Now! (Stax Records, 1966)
- In the Christmas Spirit (Stax Records, 1966)
- Hip Hug-Her (Stax Records, 1967)
- Doin' Our Thing (Stax Records, 1968)
- Soul Limbo (Stax Records, 1968)
- UpTight (Stax Records, 1969)
- The Booker T. Set (Stax Records, 1969)
- McLemore Avenue (Stax Records, 1970)
- Melting Pot (Stax Records, 1971)
- Universal Language (Asylum Records, 1977)
- That's the Way It Should Be (Columbia Records, 1994)

With Shirley Brown

- Woman to Woman (Truth Records, 1974)
- Shirley Brown (Arista Records, 1977)

With Jimmy Buffett

- Hot Water (MCA Records, 1988)

With Cate Brothers

- In One Eye and Out the Order (Asylum Records, 1976)

With Eric Clapton

- Money and Cigarettes (Warner Bros. Records, 1983)
- Behind the Sun (Warner Bros. Records, 1985)

With Doug Clifford

- Cosmo (Fantasy Records, 1972)

With Rita Coolidge

- Rita Coolidge (A&M Records, 1971)

With Steve Cropper

- Playin' My Thang (MCA Records, 1981)

With Crosby, Stills, Nash & Young

- Looking Forward (Reprise Records, 1999)

With Patti Dahlstrom

- Livin' It Thru (20th Century Records, 1976)

With Joe Dassin

- Blue Country (CBS, 1979)

With Delaney & Bonnie

- Home (Stax Records, 1969)

With Bob Dylan

- Shot of Love (Columbia Records, 1981)

With Tinsley Ellis

- Fire It Up (Alligator Records, 1997)

With The Emotions

- Sunshine (Stax Records, 1977)

With Eddie Floyd

- Knock on Wood (Stax Records, 1967)
- Soul Street (Stax Records, 1974)

With John Fogerty

- Blue Moon Swamp (Warner Bros. Records, 1997)

With Peter Frampton

- Where I Should Be (A&M Records, 1979)

With Alan Gerber

- The Alan Gerber Album (Shelter Records, 1971)

With Carol Grimes

- Carol Grimes (Decca Records, 1976)

With Richie Havens

- The End of the Beginning (A&M Records, 1976)

With Levon Helm

- Levon Helm & the RCO All-Stars (ABC Records, 1977)

With Chris Hillman

- Slippin' Away (Asylum Records, 1976)

With Albert King

- Born Under a Bad Sign (Stax Records, 1967)
- Years Gone By (Stax Records, 1969)
- Blues for Elvis – King Does the King's Things (Stax Records, 1970)
- Lovejoy (Stax Records, 1971)
- The Blues Don't Change (Stax Records, 1974)

With Freddie King

- Getting Ready (Shelter Records, 1971)
- Texas Cannonball (Shelter Records, 1972)

With Al Kooper

- White Chocolate (Sony Records, 2008)

With Mel and Tim

- Starting All Over Again (Stax Records, 1972)

With Stevie Nicks

- Bella Donna (Atco Records, 1981)

With Harry Nilsson

- Flash Harry (Mercury Records, 1980)

With Tom Petty and the Heartbreakers

- Damn the Torpedoes (MCA Records, 1979)
- Hard Promises (Backstreet Records, 1981)

With Wilson Pickett

- In the Midnight Hour (Atlantic Records, 1965)
- The Exciting Wilson Pickett (Atlantic Records, 1966)

With David Porter

- Victim of the Joke? An Opera (Enterprise Records, 1971)

With John Prine

- Common Sense (Atlantic Records, 1975)

With Otis Redding

- Pain in My Heart (Atco Records, 1964)
- The Great Otis Redding Sings Soul Ballads (Atco Records, 1965)
- Otis Blue/Otis Redding Sings Soul (Stax Records, 1965)
- The Soul Album (Stax Records, 1966)
- Complete & Unbelievable: The Otis Redding Dictionary of Soul (Stax Records, 1966)
- King & Queen (Stax Records, 1967)
- The Dock of the Bay (Stax Records, 1968)

With Bruce Roberts

- Bruce Roberts (Elektra Records, 1977)

With Leon Russell

- Will O' the Wisp (Shelter Records, 1975)

With Leo Sayer

- Here (Chrysalis Records, 1979)

With Guy Sebastian

- The Memphis Album (Sony BMG, 2007)

With Paul Shaffer

- Coast to Coast (Capitol Records, 1989)

With The Staple Singers

- Soul Folk in Action (Stax Records, 1968)

With Mavis Staples

- Mavis Staples (Volt Records, 1969)
- Only for the Lonely (Volt Records, 1970)

With Rod Stewart

- Atlantic Crossing (Warner Bros. Records, 1975)
- A Night on the Town (Warner Bros. Records, 1976)

With Billy Swan

- You're OK, I'm OK (A&M Records, 1978)

With Carla Thomas

- Memphis Queen (Stax Records, 1969)
- Love Means... (Stax Records, 1971)

With Mickey Thomas

- As Long as You Love Me (MCA Records, 1977)

With The Manhattan Transfer

- Pastiche (Atlantic Records, 1978)

With Muddy Waters

- Fathers and Sons (Chess Records, 1969)

With Tony Joe White

- Lake Placid Blues (Polydor Records, 1995)

With Jerry Lynn Williams

- Gone (Warner Bros. Records, 1979)

With Bill Withers

- Just as I Am (Sussex Records, 1971)

With Neil Young

- Silver & Gold (Reprise Records, 2000)
- Are You Passionate? (Reprise Records, 2002)

== Awards ==
In 1992, Dunn was inducted into the Rock and Roll Hall of Fame as a member of Booker T. & the MG's.

In 2007 Dunn and members of Booker T. & the MG's (Booker T. Jones, Steve Cropper and Lewie Steinberg), along with Barbara Jackson, the widow of Al Jackson, Jr., were given a Lifetime Achievement Grammy award for their contributions to popular music.

In 2017 Dunn was posthumously awarded a Lifetime Achievement Award by Bass Player Magazine for his contributions to "the art, craft, and profession of bass playing."

== Bibliography ==
- Guralnick, Peter (1999). Sweet Soul Music: Rhythm and Blues and the Southern Dream of Freedom. Back Bay Books. ISBN 978-0-316-33273-6. OCLC 41950519.
- Rosaci, Nick (2017). Soul Fingers: The Music and Life of Legendary Bassist Donald "Duck" Dunn. Hal Leonard Books. ISBN 978-1-495-05292-7.
