= Booker T. & the M.G.'s =

American R&B/funk band

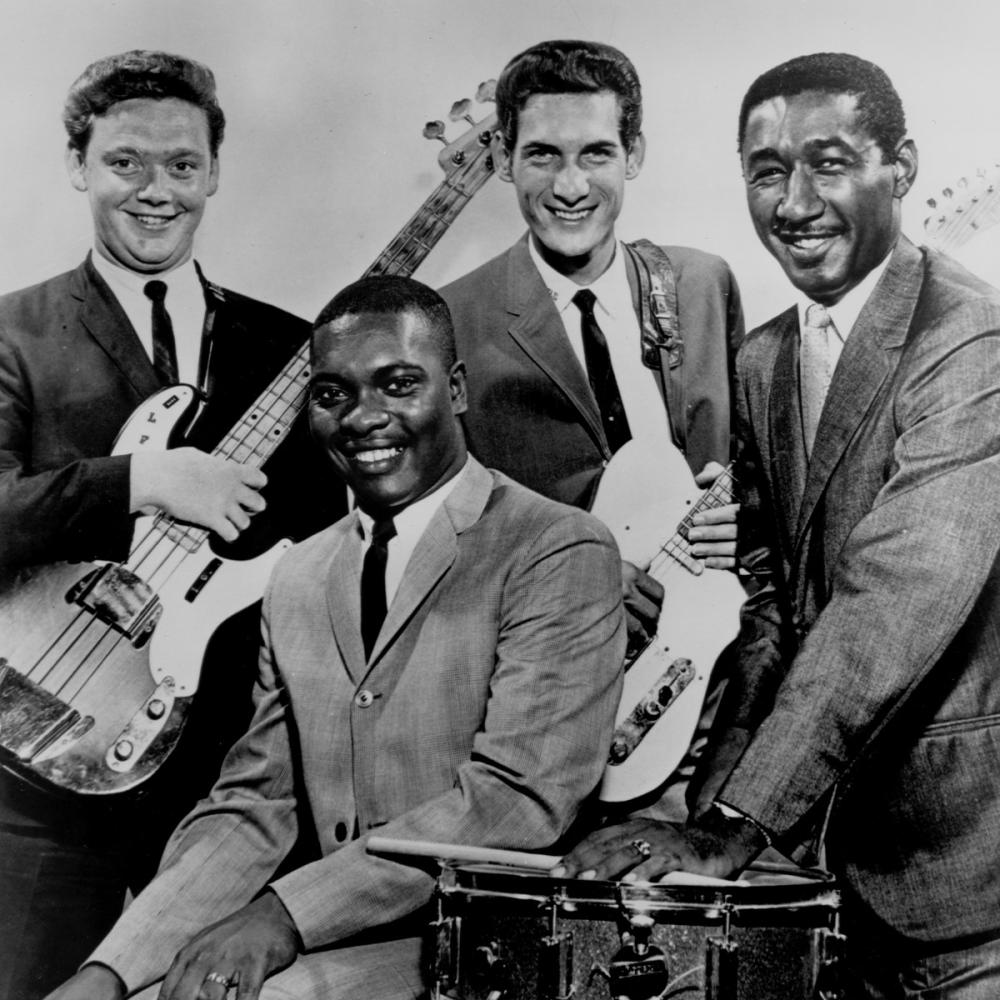
- Booker T. & the M.G.'s c. 1967 (L–R): Donald "Duck" Dunn, Booker T. Jones (seated), Steve Cropper, Al Jackson Jr.

Background information
- Origin: Memphis, Tennessee, U.S.
- Genres: Rhythm & blues; soul; funk; instrumental rock; soul jazz
- Years active: 1962–1971; 1973–1977; 1992–2012
- Labels: Atlantic; Stax
- Past members: Booker T. Jones; Steve Cropper; Al Jackson Jr.; Lewie Steinberg; Donald "Duck" Dunn; Bobby Manuel; Carson Whitsett; Willie Hall; Steve Jordan; Steve Potts
- Website: www.bookert.com

Booker T. & the M.G.'s were an American instrumental, R&B, and jazz band formed in Memphis, Tennessee, in 1962. The band helped shape the sound of Southern soul and Memphis soul. The original members of the group were Booker T. Jones (organ, piano), Steve Cropper (guitar), Lewie Steinberg (bass), and Al Jackson Jr. (drums). In the 1960s, as members of the Mar-Keys, the rotating slate of musicians that served as the house band of Stax Records, they played on hundreds of recordings by artists including Wilson Pickett, Otis Redding, Bill Withers, Sam & Dave, Carla Thomas, Rufus Thomas, Johnnie Taylor, and Albert King. They also released instrumental records under their own name, including the 1962 hit single "Green Onions". As originators of the unique Stax sound, the group was one of the most prolific, respected, and imitated of its era.

In 1965, Steinberg was replaced by Donald "Duck" Dunn, who played with the group until his death in 2012. Al Jackson Jr. was murdered in 1975, after which Dunn, Cropper, and Jones reunited on numerous occasions using various drummers, including Willie Hall, Anton Fig, Steve Jordan and Steve Potts.

The band was inducted into the Rock and Roll Hall of Fame in 1992, the Musicians Hall of Fame and Museum in Nashville, Tennessee, in 2008, the Memphis Music Hall of Fame in 2012, and the Blues Hall of Fame in 2019.

Having two white members (initially Cropper and Steinberg, later Cropper and Dunn) and two Black members (Jones and Jackson Jr.), Booker T. & the M.G.'s was one of the first racially integrated rock groups, at a time when soul music, and the Memphis music scene in particular, were generally considered the preserve of Black culture.

== Early years: 1962–1964 ==
"Green Onions", from the album Green Onions
The first track from the band's debut album. The tempo, tone and technique of "Green Onions" make it one of the most recognized soul instrumentals.

Booker T. & the M.G.'s formed as the house band of Stax Records, providing backing music for numerous singers, including Wilson Pickett and Otis Redding. In summer 1962, 17-year-old keyboardist Booker T. Jones, 20-year-old guitarist Steve Cropper, and two seasoned players, bassist Lewie Steinberg and drummer Al Jackson Jr. (the latter making his debut with the company) were in the Memphis studio to back the former Sun Records star Billy Lee Riley. During downtime, the four started playing around with a bluesy organ riff. Jim Stewart, the president of Stax Records, was in the control booth. He liked what he heard, and he recorded it. Cropper remembered a riff that Jones had come up with weeks earlier, and before long they had a second track.

Stewart wanted to release the single with the first track, "Behave Yourself", as the A-side and the second track as the B-side. Cropper and radio disc jockeys thought otherwise; soon, Stax released Booker T. & the M.G.'s' "Green Onions" backed with "Behave Yourself". In an interview with BBC Radio 2's Johnnie Walker in 2008, Cropper recalled the song's immediate popularity after Reuben Washington, a disc jockey at Memphis radio station WLOK, played it four times in a row, prompting calls from listeners asking if it had been released.

The single went to number 1 on the US Billboard R&B chart and number 3 on the pop chart. It sold over one million copies and was certified a gold disc. It has been used in numerous movies and trailers, including a pivotal scene in the motion picture American Graffiti.

Later in 1962, the band released an all-instrumental album, Green Onions. Aside from the title track, a "sequel" ("Mo' Onions") and "Behave Yourself", the album consisted of instrumental covers of popular hits.

Booker T. & the M.G.'s continued to issue instrumental singles and albums throughout the 1960s. The group was a successful recording combo in its own right, but most of the work by the musicians in the band during this period was as the core of the de facto house band at Stax Records. Members of Booker T. & the M.G.'s (often, but not always, performing as a unit, and usually supported by a horn section) performed as the studio backing band for Otis Redding, Sam & Dave, Albert King, Johnnie Taylor, Eddie Floyd, the Staple Singers, Wilson Pickett, Delaney & Bonnie and many others in the 1960s.

They played on hundreds of records, including classics like "Walking the Dog", "Hold On, I'm Comin'" (on which the multi-instrumentalist Jones played tuba over Donald "Duck" Dunn's bass line), "Soul Man", "Who's Making Love", "I've Been Loving You Too Long (To Stop Now)", and "Try a Little Tenderness", among others. Along with their counterparts in Detroit, Motown's Funk Brothers, as a backing band to numerous hits, they are considered to have originated much of the sound of soul music—particularly, in the case of the M.G.'s, Southern soul—in which "the groove" is paramount.

In the mid-1960s, Jones was often away from Memphis while studying music full-time at Indiana University. Stax writer and producer Isaac Hayes usually stepped in when Jones was unavailable for session work, and on several sessions Jones and Hayes played together with one on organ, the other on piano. However, Hayes was never a regular member of the M.G.'s, and Jones played on all the records credited to Booker T. & the M.G.'s, with one exception: the 1965 hit "Boot-Leg", a studio jam with Hayes playing keyboards in Jones's place. According to Cropper, it had been recorded with the intention of releasing it under the name of the Mar-Keys (the name, which predated the creation of the MG's, had sometimes been used on singles by the Stax house band). However, as recordings credited to Booker T. & the M.G.'s were meeting with greater commercial success than those credited to the Mar-Keys, the decision was made to credit "Boot-Leg" to Booker T. & the M.G.'s, although Jones did not participate in the recording.

Individual session credits notwithstanding, the Stax house band—Cropper, Jackson, Jones, and Steinberg, along with bassist Dunn (Cropper's bandmate in the Mar-Keys); keyboardist Isaac Hayes; and various horn players, most frequently Floyd Newman, Wayne Jackson and Andrew Love (the latter two later formed the Memphis Horns)—set a standard for soul music. Whereas the sign outside Detroit's pop-oriented Motown Records read "Hitsville U.S.A.", the marquee outside of the converted movie theater where Stax was based proclaimed "Soulsville U.S.A."

== Later success: 1965–1969 ==
Booker T. & the M.G.'s consistently issued singles from 1963 to 1965, but only a few made the charts, and none was as successful as "Green Onions". Their second album, Soul Dressing, was released in 1965. Whereas the Green Onions album contained mostly covers, every composition but one on Soul Dressing was an original. After contributing to that album, Steinberg left the group, and Dunn (who had played on previous Stax sessions) became the group's full-time bassist.

During a tour when the band was in Los Angeles playing in a Stax Revue, an informal jam session with three of the M.G.'s was recorded in Hollywood in 1965, initiated by DJ Magnificent Montague who played congas. The resulting track, "Hole in the Wall", was issued by Pure Soul Music in October 1965 credited to the Packers with writing shared by Montague, Cropper, Jackson and Jones. The track reached number 43 on Billboard, and made the Top 30 on Cash Box. All other songs released by the Packers had no involvement from Booker T. & the M.G.'s.

After a period of commercial decline, Booker T. & the M.G.'s finally returned to the Top 40 with the 1967 instrumental "Hip Hug-Her". It was the first single on which Jones played a Hammond B-3 organ, the instrument with which he is most closely associated (he used a Hammond M-3 on all of the earlier recordings, including "Green Onions"). The group also had a substantial hit with their cover of the Rascals' "Groovin'". Both tracks are included on their album Hip Hug-Her, released in the same year.

In the spring of 1967, they joined a group of Stax artists billed as the "Stax/Volt Revue" on a European tour, in which they performed in their own right and backed the other acts. In June of that year, they appeared at the Monterey Pop Festival, playing their own set and then backing Otis Redding, alongside performers like Jimi Hendrix, Janis Joplin, the Who, and Jefferson Airplane. They were invited to perform at the Woodstock Festival in 1969, but drummer Jackson was worried about the helicopter needed to deliver them to the site, and so they decided not to play.

The albums Doin' Our Thing and Soul Limbo were released in 1968. The track "Soul Limbo", featuring marimba by Terry Manning, was a hit (later used by the BBC as their theme for cricket coverage on both TV and, latterly, radio's Test Match Special), as was their version of "Hang 'Em High". In 1969, the band scored their second biggest hit with "Time Is Tight", from the soundtrack to the movie Up Tight!, scored by Jones, which reached No. 6 on the Billboard pop charts.

For the 1969 album Damifiknow!, the Mar-Keys name was revived. The members of the group were explicitly identified in the album credits as the sextet of Steve Cropper, Duck Dunn, Booker T. Jones, Al Jackson, and horn players Andrew Love and Wayne Jackson (no relation to Al). The album didn't receive much attention, and the core quartet soon returned to playing and performing as Booker T. & the M.G.'s.

== Reinterpreting the Beatles' Abbey Road and gig with CCR ==
In 1969, Dunn and Jones, in particular, had become admirers of the Beatles, especially their work on Abbey Road. The appreciation was mutual, as the Beatles had been musically influenced by the M.G.'s. John Lennon was a Stax fan, who fondly called the group "Book a Table and the Maitre d's" (in 1974, Lennon facetiously credited himself and his studio band as "Dr. Winston and Booker Table and the Maitre d's" on his original R&B-inspired instrumental, "Beef Jerky"). Paul McCartney, like Dunn, played bass melodically, without straying from the rhythm or the groove. The Beatles had even floated the possibility of recording their 1966 album Revolver at Stax, but backed out when fans besieged the Memphis studio.

In 1970, Lennon's wish was granted, in a sense, when Booker T. and the M.G.'s recorded McLemore Avenue (named for the street where Stax Records was located), on which they performed instrumental cover versions of thirteen of the songs on Abbey Road, condensing twelve of them into three medleys. The album's front cover is a parody of the front cover of Abbey Road; the back cover, with the blurred image of a mini-skirted woman at the edge of the photo, also mirrors that of Abbey Road.

Also in 1970, Booker T. & the M.G.'s sat in with Creedence Clearwater Revival (CCR) for a jam, and they were the opening act for that band's January 31 performance at the Oakland Coliseum, which was recorded for the CCR album The Concert.

== Jones's departure from Stax and Melting Pot ==
In 1971, Booker T. and the M.G.'s released what would be their last Stax single, "Melting Pot", and their last Stax album, also called Melting Pot. "Melting Pot"'s repetitive groove-oriented drumming, loping bass line, and tight rhythm guitar made it an underground hit popular in New York City block parties. The song has often been sampled by rappers and techno DJs. The full-length album version of the track is over eight minutes long and contains a passage (not included on the single) featuring some particularly powerful flourishes from Jones's Hammond B-3. Melting Pot also includes the tuneful Native American–influenced track "Fuquawi", which was also released on a single, coupled with "Jamaica This Morning".

Before Melting Pot was recorded, Jones had already left Stax and moved to California, because he disliked the changes that had occurred under the label's new chairman Al Bell. Part of the album was recorded at The Record Plant in New York City, not the Stax Studio, because Jones did not want to record there and instead opted for a different sound, hence the change of studios and cities between MG's gigs. Like Jones, Cropper had also become unhappy with business affairs at Stax and soon left to open his own studio in Memphis. However, the rhythm section of Dunn and Jackson remained on at Stax and did session and production work. Jackson (who had been in Hi Records producer Willie Mitchell's band) played on and wrote many of Al Green's biggest hits.

Without Jones, the group (billed simply as the MG's) released a "final" single, "Jamaica This Morning", in October 1971. It failed to chart, and the group name was retired for the time being.

== 1970s reunions ==
In 1973, Dunn and Stax session guitarist Bobby Manuel recruited Hammond B-3 organist Carson Whitsett to be part of a band that was to back Stefan Anderson, a promising new Stax artist. Al Jackson was later brought in. The project did not ultimately yield any results, but the rehearsals were promising, prompting Jackson and Dunn to reform the M.G.'s. This version of the band featured Whitsett in place of Jones, so it was billed as simply "the MG's".

The 1973 album entitled The MG's, with Manuel and Whitsett replacing Cropper and Jones, was not commercially successful. Whitsett went on to back Bobby "Blue" Bland, Little Milton, and Kathy Mattea, and his songs were recorded by Johnnie Taylor, Solomon Burke, B. B. King, Etta James, Conway Twitty, and Lorrie Morgan. Manuel became a staple of the Memphis music scene, playing with everybody from Al Green to Albert King, and later founded HighStacks Records (the name being a tribute to both Stax and Hi Records).

After a promising meeting in late September 1975, Jones and Cropper (who were now living in Los Angeles) and Jackson and Dunn (still in Memphis), decided to give each other three months to finish up all of their individual projects. They would then devote three years to what would be renamed Booker T. Jones & the Memphis Group. Nine days later (October 1), Al Jackson, the man Cropper would remember as "the greatest drummer to ever walk the earth", was murdered in his home.

In 1975, Al Bell tasked Stax Producer/Musician Terry Manning (who had worked on several of the MGs albums) with a project which involved taking songs previously recorded by the classic Booker T. & the M.G.'s lineup of Jones/Cropper/Dunn/Jackson, but which had never been completed or released. Manning found and performed post production in the Stax studios on 12 songs, and the album was released in the UK and France in 1976 as Union Extended.

The remaining three members and drummer Willie Hall (a session musician who had played on many Stax hits, such as Isaac Hayes's "Theme from Shaft") regrouped under their old name, Booker T. & the M.G.'s, and recorded the album Universal Language for Asylum Records in 1977. The album did not meet with either commercial or critical success, and the band once again dissolved.

Over the next decade, Cropper, Dunn and Jones remained active, producing, writing, and playing with other artists. All three joined Levon Helm, formerly the drummer of the Band, as part of his RCO All-Stars in 1977. Also in that year, Cropper and Dunn became part of the Blues Brothers band, appearing on the number-one album Briefcase Full of Blues. Cropper, Dunn and Hall also appeared in the 1980 movie The Blues Brothers, starring Dan Aykroyd and John Belushi. Cropper, Dunn and Hall later reprised their roles in Blues Brothers 2000.

== 1980s to the present ==
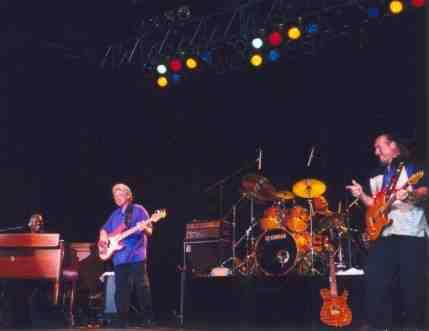
Booker T. & the M.G.'s in Tunica, Mississippi, 2002

In 1980, the hit feature film The Blues Brothers featured Cropper, Dunn and Hall as part of the primary band backing the Blues Brothers.

In 1986, former co-owner of Atlantic Records Jerry Wexler asked the group to be the house band for Atlantic Records' 40th anniversary celebration. The night before the gig, Jones came down with food poisoning, so Paul Shaffer stepped in at the last minute. The earlier rehearsals (with Jones, Cropper, Dunn, and drummer Anton Fig of Shaffer's "World's Most Dangerous Band", featured on Late Night with David Letterman) went so well that the group decided to play some dates together. Over the next few years, they played together occasionally, completing some gigs in the UK in 1990.

In 1992, after Booker T. & the M.G.'s were inducted into the Rock and Roll Hall of Fame, Bob Dylan asked Jones, Cropper, and Dunn to serve as the house band (with Fig and Jim Keltner on drums) for his "30th Anniversary Concert", commemorating his thirty years in the music business, at which they backed Dylan, Stevie Wonder, Johnny Cash, Eric Clapton, and George Harrison, among others.

At the concert, Neil Young asked the group to back him on his 1993 world tour, and Booker T. & the M.G.'s toured with Neil Young, backing him on his own compositions. The set list often included a cover of "(Sittin' On) The Dock of the Bay" (the original recording by Otis Redding had, of course, featured Booker T. & the M.G.'s).

In 1994, the group recorded its first album in 17 years, That's the Way It Should Be. Steve Jordan was the drummer on most tracks.

In 1995, when the Rock and Roll Hall of Fame opened its museum in Cleveland, Ohio, the M.G.'s served as the house band for the opening ceremonies, playing behind Aretha Franklin, Sam Moore, John Fogerty, and Al Green, as well as performing themselves.

Jones, Dunn, and Al Jackson's cousin, drummer Steve Potts, backed Neil Young on his 2002 album Are You Passionate?. Cropper, along with Isaac Hayes and Sam Moore, welcomed Stax president Jim Stewart into the Rock and Roll Hall of Fame in 2002. Cropper and Hayes were later inducted into the Songwriters Hall of Fame.

Booker T. & the M.G.'s, usually with Steve Potts on drums, still play select dates. They have been called the most influential stylists in modern American music. In early 2008 they backed singer Guy Sebastian on a sold-out tour of Australia.

In 2004, Rolling Stone ranked the group No. 93 on their list of the 100 Greatest Artists of All Time, and in 2007, the group received the Grammy Lifetime Achievement Award. Also in 2004, Eric Clapton featured Jones, Cropper, and Dunn as the house band for the first "Crossroads Guitar Festival" a two-day event held at the Cotton Bowl in Dallas, featuring outstanding performers in various musical genres who play guitar as their primary instrument. A two-disc DVD of the show was released in the same year.

Jones, in collaboration with the band Drive-By Truckers, released the album Potato Hole, featuring Neil Young on guitar, in 2009. He released The Road from Memphis in 2011; the album won a Grammy Award.

On May 13, 2012, Dunn died following two concerts in Tokyo. Since his death, the band has, for the most part, gone their separate ways. Cropper toured with the Blues Brothers, and Jones is performing as a solo artist as well as releasing new music under his name only. Steve Cropper died on December 3, 2025. As of June 2026, Jones is touring with a quartet, playing organ and singing on most tunes and occasionally featuring on guitar.

== Band name ==
For many years, Stax publicity releases stated that the initials in the band's name stood for "Memphis Group", not the MG sports car.

Musician and record producer Chips Moman, who worked at Stax Records when the band was formed, claimed that the band was named after his sports car, and only after he left the label did Stax's publicity department declare that "M.G." stood for "Memphis Group". Moman had played with Jones and Steinberg in an earlier Stax backing group called the Triumphs, which was also named after his car.

Jones, in a 2007 interview on National Public Radio's Fresh Air with Terry Gross, confirmed Moman's account of the origin of the group's name. Jones has re-confirmed this story on several occasions since, most recently as a guest on the Late Show with David Letterman on May 9, 2012.

Stax historian Rob Bowman has averred that the reason the label obscured the story of the meaning of the name M.G.'s (and concocted the "Memphis Group" explanation) was to avoid claims of trademark infringement from the manufacturers of the car. In a 2019 interview with The Guardian, Steve Cropper confirmed the motor car origin and "Memphis Group" explanation, but added 'we were being interviewed and someone asked: "What does MG actually stand for?" Duck Dunn said: "Musical geniuses!"'

== Members ==
- Booker T. Jones – organ, piano, keyboards, guitars (1962–1971, 1975–1977, 1986, 1992–2012)
- Steve Cropper – guitars (1962–1971, 1975–1977, 1986, 1992–2012; died 2025)
- Al Jackson Jr. – drums (1962–1971, 1973–1975; his death)
- Lewie Steinberg – bass (1962–1965; died 2016)
- Donald "Duck" Dunn – bass (1965–1971, 1973–1977, 1986, 1992–2012; his death)
- Bobby Manuel – guitars (1973–1975)
- Carson Whitsett – organ, piano, keyboards (1973–1975; died 2007)
- Willie Hall – drums (1975–1977)
- Steve Jordan – drums (1994–1998)
- Steve Potts – drums (1999–2012)

Additional personnel

- Jim Keltner – drums (1992–1993; Bob Dylan show; Neil Young tour)
- Anton Fig – drums (1986, 1998)

== Discography ==
=== Studio albums ===
Year	Album	Peak chart positions			
Year	Album	US 200	US R&B	US Jazz	UK
1962	Green Onions	33	—	—	11
1965	Soul Dressing	—	—	—	—
1966	And Now!	—	18	—	—
1966	In the Christmas Spirit	—	—	—	—
1967	Hip Hug-Her	35	4	—	—
1968	Doin' Our Thing	176	17	—	—
1968	Soul Limbo	167	14	—	—
1969	UpTight (soundtrack)	98	7	—	—
1969	The Booker T. Set	53	10	—	—
1970	McLemore Avenue	107	19	—	70
1971	Melting Pot	43	2	5	—
1977	Universal Language	—	59	—	—
1994	That's the Way It Should Be	—	—	—	—
"—" denotes releases that did not chart.

=== Other releases ===
- 1967: Back to Back [live] with the Mar-Keys - US No. 98
- 1968: The Best of Booker T. & the MG's (1962–1967 compilation, Atlantic SD-8202; CD reissue: Atlantic 81281 [1984] with four bonus tracks)
- 1970: Greatest Hits (1968–1970 compilation, Stax STS-2033; CD reissue: Fantasy FCD-60-004 [1986] with 6 bonus tracks)
- 1973: The MG's (released as the MG's but without Cropper and Jones)
- 1976: Union Extended (12 unreleased tracks from the 1960s; released in the UK and France only on Stax/Pye STX.1045)
- 1992: Funky Broadway: Stax Revue Live at the 5/4 Ballroom (a revue concert recorded 1965 in Los Angeles with the Mad Lads, the Astors, Carla Thomas, Rufus Thomas, the Mar-Keys and William Bell)
- 1994: The Very Best of Booker T. & the MG's (1962–1971 compilation, Rhino R2-71738)
- 1995: Play the 'Hip Hits' [also released as Soul Men in 2003] (25 unreleased tracks from the 1960s, Stax/Ace CDSXD-065)
- 1998: Time Is Tight (3-CD; anthology including greatest hits/best of album tracks/rare material/live recordings)
- 2002: Stax Instrumentals (a further 25 unreleased tracks from the 1960s, Stax/Ace CDSXD-117) with the Mar-Keys
- 2006: The Definitive Soul Collection (1962–1971 two-CD compilation, Rhino R2-77660)

=== Singles ===
Year	A-side	B-side	Label	Peak chart positions					Certifications	Album
Year	A-side	B-side	Label	US	US R&B	AUS	CAN	UK	Certifications	Album
1962	"Green Onions"	"Behave Yourself"	Volt 102; Stax 127	3	1	73	25	—		Green Onions
1962	"Jellybread"	"Aw' Mercy"	Stax 131	82	—	—	—	—		Soul Dressing
1963	"Home Grown"	"Big Train"	Stax 134	—	—	—	—	—		Soul Dressing
1963	"Chinese Checkers"	"Plum Nellie"	Stax 137	78	—	—	—	—		Soul Dressing
1963	"Fannie Mae"	"Mo' Onions"	Stax 142	97	—	—	—	—		Green Onions
1964	"Mo' Onions"	"Tic-Tac-Toe"	Stax 142	109	46	—	—	—		Soul Dressing
1964	"Soul Dressing"	"MG Party"	Stax 153	95	—	—	—	—		Soul Dressing
1964	"Can't Be Still"	"Terrible Thing"	Stax 161	—	—	—	—	—		Soul Dressing
1965	"Boot-Leg"	"Outrage"	Stax 169	58	10	—	—	—		The Best of Booker T. & the MG's
1965	"Hole in the Wall" (as the Packers)	"Go 'Head On" (as the Packers)	Pure Soul Music 1107	43	5	—	—	—		Hole in the Wall (as the Packers)
1965	"Be My Lady"	"Red Beans and Rice"	Stax 182	—	—	—	—	—		Non-album track
1966	"My Sweet Potato"	"Booker-Loo"	Stax 196	85	18	—	—	—		And Now!
1966	"Jingle Bells"	"Winter Wonderland"	Stax 203	—	—	—	—	—		In the Christmas Spirit
1967	"Hip Hug-Her"	"Summertime"	Stax 211	37	6	—	38	51 (Note: Chart position is from the official UK "Breakers List".)		Hip Hug-Her
1967	"Groovin'"	"Slim Jenkins' Place"	Stax 224	21 (A); 70 (B)	10 —	—	2 —	— 58		Hip Hug-Her
1967	"Winter Snow"	"Silver Bells"	Stax 236	—	—	—	—	—		Non-album track
1968	"Soul Limbo"	"Heads or Tails"	Stax STA-0001	17	7	10	8	30		Soul Limbo
1968	"Hang 'Em High"	"Over Easy"	Stax STA-0013	9	35	98	13	—		Soul Limbo
1969	"Time Is Tight"	"Johnny, I Love You"	Stax STA-0028	6	7	10	8	4		Up Tight (soundtrack)
1969	"Mrs. Robinson"	"Soul Clap '69"	Stax STA-0037	37	35	57	21	35		The Booker T. Set
1969	"Slum Baby"	"Meditation"	Stax STA-0049	88	46	—	70	—		Non-album track
1970	"Something"	"Sunday Sermon"	Stax STA-0073	76	—	—	—	—		McLemore Avenue
1971	"Melting Pot"	"Kinda Easy Like"	Stax STA-0082	45	21	—	90	—		Melting Pot
1971	"Jamaica This Morning" (as the MG's)	"Fuquawi"	Stax STA-0108	—	—	—	—	—		Non-album track
1973	"Sugarcane" (as the MG's)	"Blackside" (as the MG's)	Stax STA-0169	—	67	—	—	—		The MG's
1974	"Neckbone" (as the MG's)	"Breezy" (as the MG's)	Stax STA-0200	—	—	—	—	—		The MG's
1977	"Sticky Stuff"	"Tie Stick"	Asylum E-45392	—	68	—	—	—		Universal Language
1977	"Grab Bag"	"Reincarnation"	Asylum E-45424	—	—	—	—	—		Universal Language
1979	"Green Onions"	"Boot-Leg"	Atlantic (UK) K-10109	—	—	—	—	7	BPI: Silver	The Best of Booker T. & the MG's
1994	"Cruisin'"	"Just My Imagination"	Columbia 38-77526	—	—	—	—	—		That's the Way It Should Be
"—" denotes releases that did not chart or were not released in that territory.

- Note: Through a period between late 1963 and early 1965, Billboard magazine did not publish an R&B singles chart. R&B chart figures for this era are from Cashbox magazine.
