= Pastiche (album) =

Studio album by the Manhattan Transfer
- Released: 1978
- Recorded: December 1976 – September 1977
- Genre: Jazz
- Label: Atlantic
- Producers: Tim Hauser, Steve Barri

The Manhattan Transfer chronology
Coming Out (1976)	Pastiche (1978)	The Manhattan Transfer Live (1978)

Pastiche is an album by the Manhattan Transfer, released in 1978 by Atlantic Records. This was the last studio album the Manhattan Transfer recorded with Laurel Massé, who because of a car accident in early 1979 decided to end her association with the group. The album was re-issued on CD with Rhino as distributor in 1994.

== Critical reception ==
The Globe and Mail wrote that "the group has run out of the material they do best and they now rely on pale imitations of western swing with, on each album, one attempt at an old Motown number."

== Charts ==
Pastiche peaked at No. 66 on the Billboard magazine Top Pop Catalog Albums chart.

== Track listing ==
1. "Four Brothers" (Jimmy Giuffre) – 3:47
2. "A Gal in Calico" (Arthur Schwartz, Leo Robin) – 2:41
3. "Love for Sale" (Cole Porter) – 3:57
4. "Je voulais te dire que je t'attends" (Michel Jonasz, Millmer Peter) – 4:20
5. "On a Little Street in Singapore" (Peter DeRose, Billy Hill) – 3:15
6. "In a Mellow Tone" (Duke Ellington, Milt Gabler) – 3:12
7. "Walk in Love" (John Klemmer, David Batteau) – 3:04
8. "Who, What, When, Where, Why" (Rupert Holmes) – 3:28
9. "It's Not the Spotlight" (Gerry Goffin, Barry Goldberg) – 3:37
10. "Pieces of Dreams" (Dick Addrisi, Don Addrisi) – 2:53
11. "Where Did Our Love Go" (Holland–Dozier–Holland) – 2:45
12. "Single Girl" (Tim Hauser, Laurel Massé, Alan Paul, Janis Siegel) – 3:07

The twelfth track, "Single Girl", was omitted or replaced (depending on the country of release) in the compact cassette version of the album.

The Spanish original LP contains the song "Eso es el amor" (Pepe Iglesias) at the beginning of side B (thus, between tracks 6 & 7). Also edited as a single A-side (with "Single Girl" on the B-side), it is not included on any CD release.

== Personnel ==
The Manhattan Transfer

- Tim Hauser – vocals
- Laurel Massé – vocals
- Alan Paul – vocals
- Janis Siegel – vocals, vocal arrangements (1, 3–7, 12)

Guests

- Jon Mayer – acoustic piano (1), Fender Rhodes (5)
- Don Grolnick – Fender Rhodes (2)
- John Barnes – acoustic piano (3)
- David Wallace – acoustic piano (4, 11), harpsichord (4), calliope (4), keyboards (12)
- Michael Boddicker – Oberheim synthesizer (5, 7)
- Dave Frishberg – acoustic piano (6)
- Mike Melvoin – keyboards (7)
- David Foster – acoustic piano (8)
- Michael Omartian – Oberheim synthesizer (8, 10)
- Booker T. Jones – acoustic piano (9), organ (9)
- Richard Tee – acoustic piano (9)
- Tom Hensley – acoustic piano (10)
- Ira Newborn – guitar (1, 2-3, 5-6, 7), acoustic guitar (9), musical arrangements and conductor
- Dick Frank – guitar (2)
- Buddy Emmons – steel guitar (2-3)
- Pete Wade – guitar (3)
- Ben Benay – guitar (8, 10), horn and string arrangements (8, 10)
- Jay Graydon – guitar (8, 10), rhythm track arrangements (8, 10)
- Steve Cropper – electric guitar (9)
- Wayne Johnson – guitar (11, 12), rhythm arrangements (12), vocal arrangements (12)
- Andy Muson – bass guitar (1, 3–7), vocal arrangements (1, 3–7)
- Stu Woods – bass guitar (2)
- Scott Edwards – bass guitar (8, 10)
- Donald Dunn – bass guitar (9)
- Michael Schnoebelen – bass guitar (11, 12)
- Art Rodriguez – drums (1-2)
- Steve Gadd – drums (2)
- Jim Gordon – drums (3-4)
- Steve Schaeffer – drums (5-7)
- Jeff Porcaro – drums (8, 10)
- Willie Hall – drums (9)
- Peter Johnson – drums (11, 12)
- Larry Emerine – crash cymbal (4)
- Tommy Vig – percussion (2)
- Bobbye Hall – percussion (7)
- Victor Feldman – percussion (8, 10)
- David Banks – rodeo yell (2)
- Johnny Gimble – fiddle (3)
- Hubert Hester – fiddle (3)
- Shorty Lavender – fiddle (3)
- Charlie McCoy – harmonica (3)
- Dorothy Ashby – harp (7)
- Al Cohn – saxophone (1)
- Lewis Del Gatto – saxophone (1)
- Jimmy Giuffre – saxophone (1)
- Lee Konitz – saxophone (1)
- Don Roberts – baritone saxophone (11)
- Pete Christlieb – reeds (3, 5)
- Don Menza – reeds (3, 5)
- Jay Migliori – reeds (3, 5)
- Willie Schwartz – reeds (3, 5)
- Joe Roccisano – reeds (3, 5)
- Wayne Andre – trombone (1)
- Urbie Green – trombone (1)
- Dave Taylor – trombone (1)
- Garnett Brown – trombone (3, 5)
- Vincent Fanuele – trombone (3-5)
- Jack Redmond – trombone (3-5)
- Britt Woodman – trombone solo (3), trombone (4)
- Randy Brecker – trumpet (1)
- Marky Markowitz – trumpet (1)
- Alan Rubin – trumpet (1)
- Marvin Stamm – trumpet (1)
- Oscar Brashear – trumpet (3, 5)
- Chuck Findley – trumpet (3, 5)
- Gene Goe – trumpet (3, 5)
- Don Rader – trumpet (3, 5)
- Gene Page – string arrangements and conductor (11, 12)

Production

- Producers – Tim Hauser (tracks 1–7, 9, 11 & 12); Steve Barri (tracks 8 & 10).
- Co-Producer – Janis Siegel
- Associate Producer – Andy Muson (tracks 1 & 3–7)
- Engineers – Larry Emerine, Phil Kaye, Gerry Nixon, Gene Paul and Toby Scott.
- Second Engineers – Tim Kramer and Stephen Marcussen
- Assistant Engineer – Stephen Marcussen
- Remixed by Larry Emerine
- Tracks 8 & 10 recorded and remixed by Phil Kaye, assisted by Joe Laux and Stephen Marcussen.
- Recorded at Studio 55 and Clover Recording Studios (Los Angeles, CA); Kendun Recorders (Burbank, CA); Atlantic Studios, A&R Recording Studios (New York, NY); The Sound Lab (Nashville, TN); EMI Studios 301 (Sydney, Australia).
- Mastered by Allen Zentz at Allen Zentz Mastering (San Clemente, CA).
- Concertmasters – Sid Sharp, Paul Shure and Gerald Vinci
- Musical Contractors – Jules Chakin and Olivia Page
- Art Direction and Design – Fayette Hauser
- Photography – Gary Merrin, Roger Sandler and Gai Terrell
