= Soul Limbo =

Studio album by Booker T. & the M.G.'s
- Released: September 1968
- Recorded: 1968
- Studios: Stax, Memphis
- Genres: R&B, instrumental rock
- Length: 39:21
- Label: Stax
- Producers: Booker T. & the M.G.'s

Booker T. & the M.G.'s chronology
Doin' Our Thing (1968)	Soul Limbo (1968)	Up Tight (1969)

Professional ratings
Review scores
Source	Rating
AllMusic	3.5/5 stars
Rolling Stone	(positive)

Soul Limbo is the seventh studio album by the American R&B band Booker T. & the M.G.'s, released in 1968 on Stax Records. The album was the first Stax LP issued after the label severed its ties with former distributor Atlantic Records in 1968.

== Overview ==
The title track features a marimba solo by Terry Manning and cowbell by Isaac Hayes. The song was later covered by the English punk band Snuff. It references the Trinidadian dance and game the limbo, which had a surge of popularity in the United States starting in the mid-1950s. The song makes use of a common chord progression that was featured in such 1950s and 1960s hits as "La Bamba", "Louie Louie", and "Wild Thing".

The album also features the group's hit version of the title theme from the film Hang 'Em High.

== Chart performance ==
The album peaked at No. 127 on the Billboard Top LPs, during a nine-week run on the chart.

== In popular culture ==
The title track is perhaps best known in the United Kingdom as the theme tune for BBC Television's cricket coverage and also for BBC Radio’s Test Match Special. For the 1999 ICC Cricket World Cup in England, the Barmy Army group of English cricket supporters recorded "Come on England", set to the tune of the title track and released by Wildstar Records. The music video included appearances from Ian Botham, Ronnie Irani, Dickie Bird and Chris Tarrant.

== Track listing ==
Side one

1. "Be Young, Be Foolish, Be Happy" (J.R. Cobb, Ray Whitley)
2. "La-La (Means I Love You)" (Thom Bell, William Hart)
3. "Hang 'Em High" (Dominic Frontiere)
4. "Willow Weep for Me" (Ann Ronell)
5. "Over Easy" (Booker T. & the M.G.'s)
6. "Soul Limbo" (Booker T. & the M.G.'s)

Side two

1. "Eleanor Rigby" (John Lennon, Paul McCartney)
2. "Heads or Tails" (Booker T. & the M.G.'s)
3. "(Sweet Sweet Baby) Since You've Been Gone" (Aretha Franklin, Teddy White)
4. "Born Under a Bad Sign" (William Bell, Booker T. Jones)
5. "Foxy Lady" (Jimi Hendrix)

== Personnel ==
Booker T. & the M.G.s

- Booker T. Jones - Hammond organ, clavinet, piano, guitar
- Steve Cropper - guitar
- Donald Dunn - bass guitar
- Al Jackson Jr. - drums, percussion

with:

- Terry Manning - marimba on "Soul Limbo"
- Isaac Hayes - cowbell on "Soul Limbo"

== Charts ==
Chart (1968)	Peak position
US Billboard Top LPs	127
