= Cate Brothers =

American band

- Origin: Fayetteville, Arkansas
- Genres: Country soul
- Label: Asylum Records
- Members: Earl Cate; Ernest "Ernie" Cate; David Renko; John Davies; Mickey Eoff
- Past members: Terry Cagle; Porky Hill; Billy Wright; Ron Eoff

The Cate Brothers (founded as The Cates Gang and also known as Cate Bros. Band) is an American band led by the songwriter-musician duo of twin brothers Earl and Ernest "Ernie" Cate (born December 26, 1942), from Fayetteville, Arkansas. In the mid-1960s, they became performers of country soul music at clubs and dances in Arkansas and elsewhere in the mid-South of the United States. Both brothers are singers, with Earl playing guitar and Ernie playing piano. The group began recording in 1970, releasing their final album in 2006.

== History ==
In their hometown of Fayetteville in the 1950s, where rock-and-roll pioneer Ronnie Hawkins had also grown up during the 1940s, Hawkins owned and operated the Rockwood Club. Other early rock musicians came to play there, including Jerry Lee Lewis, Carl Perkins, Roy Orbison, and Conway Twitty. During the late 1950s the Cate brothers associated with Hawkins and his band, the Hawks, including drummer Levon Helm. In 1958, Hawkins and his band left Arkansas and settled in Canada. Later the Hawks went on to form the Band.

In the early 1970s, the duo began recording as The Cates Gang, releasing two albums on Metromedia Records. In 1975, Helm introduced the Cate brothers to a record company representative in Los Angeles. The brothers soon after received a recording contract with Asylum Records and began releasing albums as The Cate Bros.

Their self-titled debut album released in 1975 was produced by guitarist Steve Cropper. He also performed on the record along with Levon Helm. Bass duties were carried out by Scott Edwards, Klaus Voormann, Bob Glaub, and Leland Sklar. The album contained the duo's only Top 40 single, "Union Man", which spent 20 weeks on the Billboard Hot 100, peaking at number 24 in May 1976.

Two more albums followed, In One Eye and out the Other in 1976 and Cate Bros. Band (with drummer Terry Cagle and bassist Ron Eoff) in 1977. Going forward, they would release albums under both names. In 1979, they reached a wider audience when they appeared on the PBS music television program Austin City Limits, taped in December 1978. In 1979, the brothers released their fourth and final album of the period, Fire on the Tracks, which reached number 24 on the rock album chart.

Although they only issued one recording through the 1980s, they remained a popular touring act around the southern country rock and blues circuit of the Tennessee and Arkansas region.

Around 1980-1981 they frequently performed with Levon Helm, including an appearance on SCTV. On September 6, 1980, "Levon Helm & The Cate Brothers" opened a three act concert at the State Fairgrounds in Lewiston, ME. They were followed by Roy Buchanan and the headliner, The Grateful Dead. Tickets were $12.

In 1983–1984, the entire Cate Bros. Band joined Levon Helm, Rick Danko, Richard Manuel, and Garth Hudson in a revival of the Band.

The group also worked with singer Maria Muldaur.

The Cate brothers resumed recording in the mid-1990s, releasing five albums on independent labels from 1995 to 2009. Their 1995 release, Radioland was recorded at Crosstown Studios in Memphis. Produced by Rusty McFarland and Jay Shefield, it was recorded and mixed by McFarland, who also played bass, guitar, synthesizer, percussion, and backing vocals on some tracks. It featured blues guitarist Coco Montoya, formerly with the 1980s version of John Mayall & the Bluesbreakers.

The group has been semi-retired since 2010, only playing a handful of shows a year, although Earl continues to perform as "Earl & Them".

== Band members ==
While the early albums made heavy use of studio musicians, the core group has remained a small, fairly consistent lineup throughout its career.

Levon Helm's nephew, Terry Cagle, played drums with the Cate brothers from before their first recordings, when still called The Del-Rays, until 1989. He went on to found The Jungle Bush Beaters in 1999, returning to play with The Cates again in later years. He died on February 12, 2023, at the age of 72. He was initially replaced by Porky Hill, who played with the group for 12 years, and died in September 2000. Bass player Ron Eoff's brother Mickey Eoff then joined the band on drums.

Billy Wright played bass in The Cates Gang. Ron Eoff played bass with the group from the mid-1970s until the mid-1990s, when John Davies took over.

David Renko joined on saxophone in the 1990s.

== Discography ==
- Wanted (Metromedia Records, 1970) The Cates Gang
- Come Back Home (Metromedia Records, 1972) The Cates Gang
- Cate Bros. (Asylum, 1975) (AUS #96)
- In One Eye and Out the Other (Asylum, 1976)
- Cate Bros. Band (Asylum, 1977)
- Fire on the Tracks (Atlantic, 1979)
- Crisp 'N Tasty (Accord, 1983)
- Radioland (Icehouse, 1995)
- Struck a Vein (Big Burger, 1997)
- Arkansas Soul Siblings: The Crazy Cajun Recordings (Edsel, 1999) – recorded early/mid 1970s
- Live (Current, 1999)
- Play by the Rules (Louisiana Red Hot, 2004)
- In The Natural State with Jimmy Thackery (Rykodisc, 2006)
- Born to Wander: The Crazy Cajun Recordings (Broadside, 2009) - remastered reissue of Arkansas Soul Siblings
- The Malibu Sessions EP (Swingin' Door Records, 2014) - recorded 1982
- Live At George's November 19th, 2019 (50th Anniversary) (Cosmic Cowboy Records, 2021)
