= UpTight (soundtrack) =

Soundtrack album by Booker T. & the M.G.'s
- Released: January 1969
- Recorded: 1968
- Studios: Stax, Memphis
- Genres: R&B, instrumental rock
- Length: 35:34
- Label: Stax
- Producer: Booker T. Jones

Booker T. & the M.G.'s chronology
Soul Limbo (1968)	UpTight (1969)	The Booker T. Set (1969)

Professional ratings
Review scores
Source	Rating
AllMusic	link

UpTight is a soundtrack album by Southern soul band Booker T. & the M.G.'s for the film of the same title. The album features "Time Is Tight", the single version of which became a US Top 10 hit (the second biggest of their career) and a signature song for the band.

== Recording ==
The version of "Time Is Tight" included on the UpTight soundtrack album is an alternate recording, which differs from the single version in several respects: it is in stereo, it is played at a faster tempo, it runs almost two minutes longer (4'55"), and it includes both an extended introduction and an instrumental "breakdown" (beginning around 3'30"), neither of which are in the single version. "Johnny, I Love You" (the B-side of "Time Is Tight") features a rare vocal by keyboardist Booker T. Jones. Judy Clay provides vocals on "Children, Don't Get Weary."

The album was recorded at Stax Records' studios by Ron Capone, produced by Jones, and was overdubbed and mixed at Ardent Studios by Steve Cropper and Terry Manning.

== Chart performance ==
The album charted at number 98 on the Billboard Top LPs chart and number 7 on the Billboard R&B albums chart.

== Reception ==
Village Voice critic Robert Christgau called it a "superb score" and later said that until the band's 1971 Melting Pot album, UpTight was the exception to the "somewhat mechanical, boxy rhythms that always made their albums boring even though the individual cuts were unexceptionable".

"Time is Tight" was covered by the Clash on their 10-inch vinyl Black Market Clash LP in 1980 (and later on their Super Black Market Clash CD) and by Paul Shaffer on his 1993 double CD The World's Most Dangerous Party.

== Track listings ==
All tracks composed by Booker T. Jones, except where indicated

Side 1

1. "Johnny, I Love You" – 3:00
2. "Cleveland Now" – 3:08
3. "Children, Don't Get Weary" (Frank Williams) – 3:35
4. "Tank's Lament" – 2:49
5. "Blues in the Gutter" – 3:24

Side 2

1. "We've Got Johnny Wells" – 3:46
2. "Down at Ralph's Joint" – 3:51
3. "Deadwood Dick" – 4:29
4. "Run Tank Run" – 2:37
5. "Time Is Tight" (Booker T. Jones, Steve Cropper, Donald "Duck" Dunn, Al Jackson Jr.) – 4:55

== Charts ==
Chart (1969)	Peak position
US Billboard Top LPs	98
US Top R&B Albums	7
