= Steve Cropper =

American musician and record producer (1941–2025)

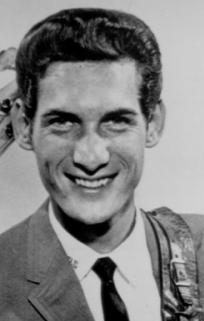
- Cropper in 1967

Background information
- Born: Stephen Lee Cropper; October 21, 1941; Dora, Missouri, U.S.
- Origin: Memphis, Tennessee, U.S.
- Died: December 3, 2025 (aged 84) Nashville, Tennessee, U.S.
- Genres: R&B; soul; southern soul; electric blues; blues
- Occupations: Musician; songwriter; producer; actor
- Instrument: Guitar
- Years active: 1958–2025
- Labels: Stax; Provogue
- Formerly of: The Mar-Keys; Booker T. & the M.G.'s; The Blues Brothers
- Website: playitsteve.com

Stephen Lee Cropper (October 21, 1941 – December 3, 2025), sometimes known as "The Colonel", was an American guitarist, songwriter and record producer. He was the guitarist of the Stax Records house band, Booker T. & the M.G.'s, which backed artists such as Otis Redding, Wilson Pickett, Sam & Dave, Carla Thomas, Rufus Thomas, Johnnie Taylor and Neil Young. He also acted as the producer of many of these artists' records. He was later a member of the Blues Brothers band. Rolling Stone magazine ranked him 36th on its list of the 100 greatest guitarists. He won two Grammy Awards out of his seven nominations.

== Early life ==
Cropper was born in Dora, Missouri, on October 21, 1941. He was raised in Dora and West Plains before moving with his family to Memphis at age 9. There, he was exposed to black gospel music, which had an impact on him musically. He attended Messick High School.

Cropper got his first guitar at age 14, and admired guitarists Tal Farlow, Chuck Berry, Jimmy Reed, Chet Atkins, Lowman Pauling of The "5" Royales, Earl Cate of The Cate Brothers Band and Billy Butler of the Bill Doggett band, among others.

== Career ==
Cropper and guitarist Charlie Freeman formed the Royal Spades, who eventually became the Mar-Keys. The name referred to the marquee outside Stax studios, known as Satellite Records at the time. Eventually, the Mar-Keys began playing on sessions and had a hit single of their own with "Last Night" in 1961.

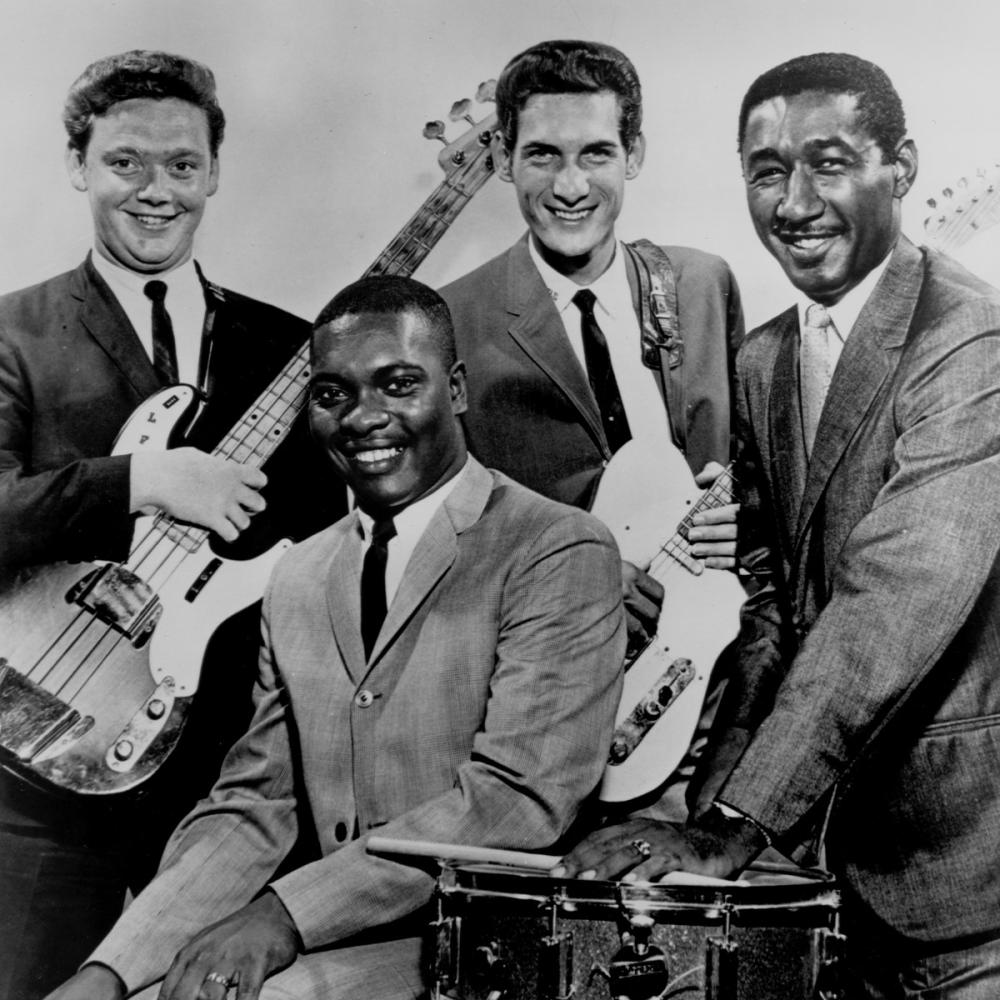
Cropper (second from right) with Booker T. & the M.G.'s, 1967

Besides being impressed with the young guitarist's playing, Stax Records president Jim Stewart saw professionalism and maturity beyond Cropper's years. When American Records founder Chips Moman left Stax, Cropper became the company's A&R man. He became a founding member of the Stax house band Booker T. & the M.G.'s, along with Hammond organ player Booker T. Jones, bassist Lewie Steinberg (who was replaced by Donald "Duck" Dunn soon thereafter) and drummer Al Jackson Jr. As a house guitarist, he played on many recordings such as "(Sittin' On) the Dock of the Bay", co-written with and performed by Otis Redding and Sam & Dave's "Soul Man" on which he was mentioned by name. When Cropper played on the song's remake by the Blues Brothers, lead singer John Belushi again mentioned Cropper. On the early Stax recordings, Cropper is known to have played a 1956 Fender Esquire and later used a blonde Fender Telecaster.

At this time, Cropper's fame was not limited to the United States. The Beatles favored Cropper's playing, and his production on Otis Redding records. John Lennon and Paul McCartney made tentative plans to record in Memphis and to work with the guitarist. However Brian Epstein canceled the sessions, citing security problems.

Along with influential work with Booker T & The M.G.'s, Cropper co-wrote "Knock on Wood" with Eddie Floyd, "In the Midnight Hour" with Wilson Pickett and "(Sittin' On) The Dock of the Bay" with Otis Redding. In 1969, Cropper released his first solo album, With a Little Help from My Friends.

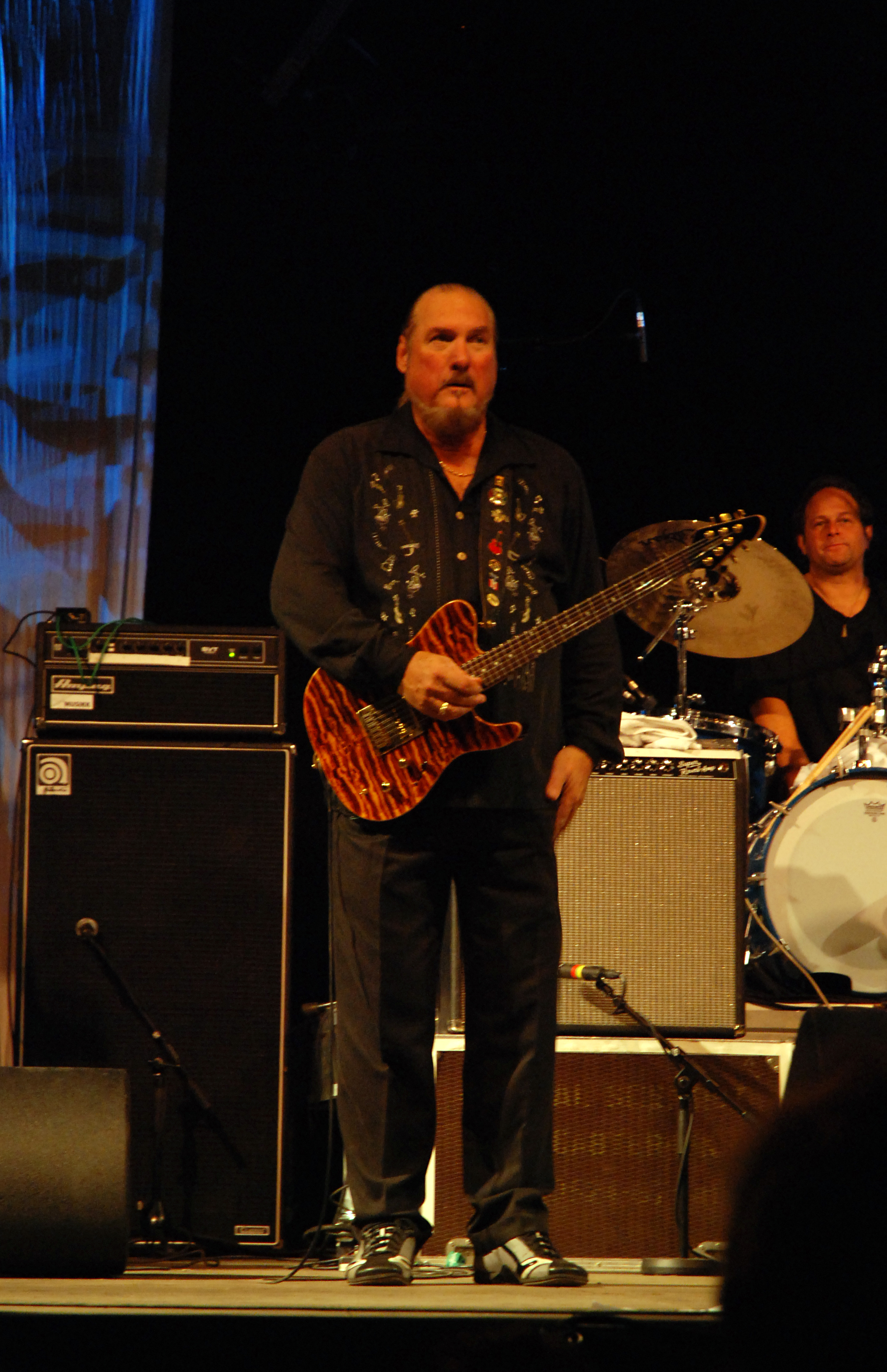
Cropper performing at the 2007 Hamar Music Festival

When Cropper left Stax in the fall of 1970, the label lost one of its most successful producers and songwriters. Cropper then set up TMI Studios with Jerry Williams and former Mar-Key Ronnie Stoots. He worked with many musicians including Ringo Starr, Rod Stewart, John Prine, and Jeff Beck.

By 1975, Cropper had moved to Los Angeles and along with Jones, Jackson, and Dunn, reformed Booker T. & the M.G.'s. Jackson, whom Cropper called "the greatest drummer to ever walk the Earth," was murdered in his Memphis home before the group could make their comeback. In 1978, Cropper and Dunn became members of Levon Helm's RCO All-Stars and then went on to figure prominently in the Blues Brothers Band with drummer Willie Hall. This led to two albums, appearances in the movies The Blues Brothers and Blues Brothers 2000, and the movies' soundtracks. Cropper also re-recorded "(Sittin' On) The Dock of the Bay" (1979) for Sammy Hagar. Cropper lived in Los Angeles for the next thirteen years before moving to Nashville and reuniting with the Blues Brothers Band in 1988.

Cropper has a cameo in the "Weird Al" Yankovic mockumentary The Compleat Al (1985), where he plays a bit of "Soul Man" in an unsuccessful attempt to join Al's band.

In 1991, Cropper played on two separate nights of the Guitar Legends, Seville 1991 concerts as part of the celebration of Seville hosting the 1992 Expo exhibition. The concerts over five nights included some of the world's best guitarists such as Cropper, Keith Richards, BB King, Robert Cray, Eric Clapton, Bo Diddley, Brian May, Albert Collins, Bob Dylan, Joe Satriani, and Steve Vai.

In 1992, Booker T. & the M.G.'s were inducted into the Rock and Roll Hall of Fame and Cropper appeared with a new line-up of the group for the Bob Dylan 30th Anniversary concert, in October 1992 at Madison Square Garden, where they performed Dylan's songs in tribute. The concert was recorded and later released as The 30th Anniversary Concert Celebration (1993).

In 1996, Cropper was named "the greatest living guitar player" by Britain's Mojo magazine. When asked what he thought of Cropper, the guitarist Keith Richards said, "Perfect, man." In February 1998, Cropper released The Interview – Play It, Steve! which was a series of recording meant to reflect on his own career. The album title came from the "shout" of the title phrase by Moore on Sam & Dave's "Soul Man" and later by John Belushi (with the Blues Brothers).

In June 2004, Cropper appeared with Dunn and Jones as the backing band for Eric Clapton's Crossroads Guitar Festival, held at the Cotton Bowl in Dallas. Others who appeared included Joe Walsh and David Hidalgo. On June 9, 2005, Cropper was inducted into the Songwriters Hall of Fame.

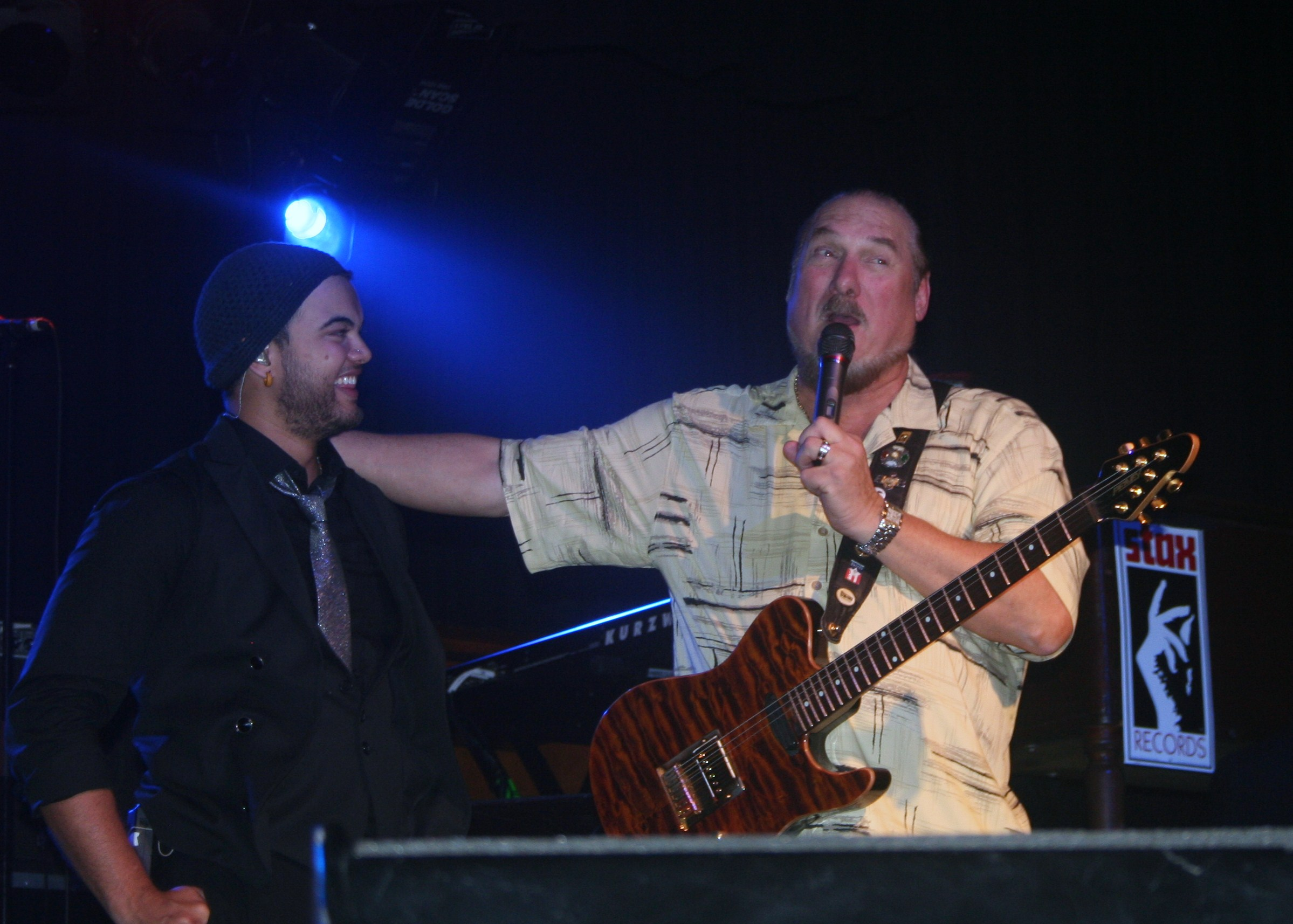
Cropper toured Australia with Guy Sebastian, playing on Sebastian's The Memphis Album tour in March 2008

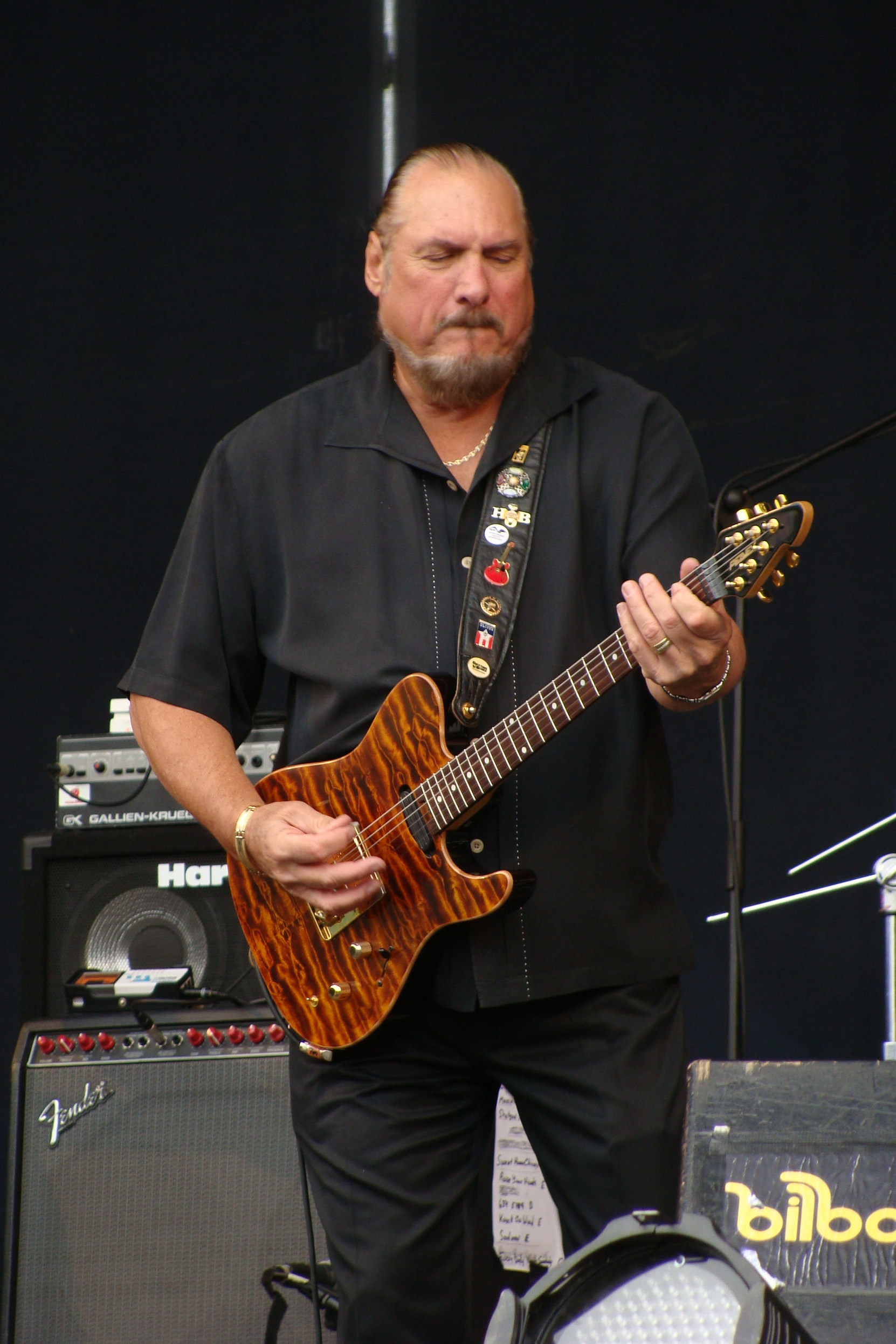
Cropper performing with the Blues Brothers at the 2008 Bilbao BBK Live festival

He co-produced The Memphis Album (2007), recorded by Australian soul singer Guy Sebastian. Cropper also played guitar on the subsequent promotional tour, which was recorded and released two years later as The Memphis Tour. On March 2, 2008, Cropper and Sebastian were guests on the Vega Sunday Session with host Mark Gable from the rock band the Choirboys. On July 29, 2008, Cropper and Felix Cavaliere released the album Nudge It Up a Notch. In August 2008, Cropper appeared at the Rhythm Festival alongside the Animals.

On November 12, 2009, EMP/SFM presented Cropper with their "Founders Award". On October 17, 2010, Cropper was inducted into the Nashville Songwriters Hall of Fame.

On August 9, 2011, Cropper released the album Dedicated which was his tribute to the "5" Royales. In 2013, he was a special guest at selected concerts as part of Peter Frampton's Guitar Circus Tour, including the first performance which featured Frampton, Robert Cray, and Vince Gill. Cropper appeared in April of that year with Jones, Matt "Guitar" Murphy, as well as Booker T. & the MG's at Eric Clapton's 4th Crossroads Guitar Festival at Madison Square Garden in New York City.

In November 2021, Cropper's Fire It Up was nominated for a Grammy Award in the Best Contemporary Blues Album category.

In August 2024, under the band name Steve Cropper and the Midnight Hour, Cropper released the album Friendlytown. Billy Gibbons of ZZ Top is featured on lead guitar throughout the album, while Brian May of Queen guests on the single "Too Much Stress".

== Death ==
Cropper died in Nashville on December 3, 2025, at the age of 84. A cause of death was not immediately known. A few days before, he was at a rehabilitation facility in Nashville recovering from a recent fall.

== Awards and nominations ==
Year	Ceremony	Category	Nominated work	Result	Ref.
1967	Grammy Awards	Best Rhythm and Blues Group Recording, Vocal or Instrumental	Hip Hug-Her	Nominated	
1967	Grammy Awards	Best Rhythm and Blues Recording	Try A Little Tenderness	Nominated	
1968	Grammy Awards	Best Rhythm and Blues Song	(Sittin' On) The Dock Of The Bay	Won	
1994	Grammy Awards	Best Pop Instrumental Performance	Cruisin'	Won	
1995	Grammy Awards	Best R&B Performance By A Duo Or Group With Vocal	A Change Is Gonna Come	Nominated	
2008	Grammy Awards	Best Pop Instrumental Performance	Love Appetite	Nominated	
2022	Grammy Awards	Best Contemporary Blues Album	Fire It Up	Nominated	

== Discography ==
- 1969: With a Little Help from My Friends
- 1969: Jammed Together (with Albert King and Pops Staples)
- 1971: This Is ... Steve Cropper & His Friends (compilation of With a Little Help from My Friends and Jammed Together, released in France only)
- 1981: Playin' My Thang
- 1982: Night After Night
- 1998: The Interview — Play It, Steve!
- 2008: Nudge It Up A Notch (with Felix Cavaliere)
- 2010: Midnight Flyer (with Felix Cavaliere)
- 2011: Dedicated — A Salute to the 5 Royales
- 2017: Steve Cropper, Lou Marini and the Original Blues Brothers Band — The Last Shade of Blue Before Black
- 2021: Fire It Up
- 2024: Friendlytown (as Steve Cropper & the Midnight Hour)
- 2026: Watching the Tide (as Steve Cropper & the Midnight Hour) (posthumous release)

== Collaborations ==
With Alabama

- Southern Star (RCA Records, 1989)

With Jimmy Barnes

- Soul Searchin' (Liberation Music, 2016)

With William Bell

- The Soul of a Bell (Stax Records, 1967)
- Bound to Happen (Stax Records, 1969)

With Barbi Benton

- Something New (Polydor Records, 1976)

With Big Star

- Third/Sister Lovers (PVC, 1978)

With Stephen Bishop

- Bish (ABC Records, 1978)

With Frank Black

- Honeycomb (Cooking Vinyl, 2005)
- Fast Man Raider Man (Cooking Vinyl, 2006)

With Bobby and the Midnites

- Where the Beat Meets the Street (Columbia Records, 1984)

With Booker T. & the M.G.'s

- Green Onions (Stax Records, 1962)
- Soul Dressing (Stax Records, 1965)
- And Now! (Stax Records, 1966)
- In the Christmas Spirit (Stax Records, 1966)
- Hip Hug-Her (Stax Records, 1967)
- Doin' Our Thing (Stax Records, 1968)
- Soul Limbo (Stax Records, 1968)
- UpTight (Stax Records, 1969)
- The Booker T. Set (Stax Records, 1969)
- McLemore Avenue (Stax Records, 1970)
- Melting Pot (Stax Records, 1971)
- Universal Language (Asylum Records, 1977)
- That's the Way It Should Be (Columbia Records, 1994)

With Ronnie Baker Brooks

- Times Have Changed (Provogue Records, 2017)

With Jimmy Buffett

- Hot Water (MCA Records, 1988)

With Billy Burnette

- Try Me (Curb, 1985)

With Brian Cadd

- White on White (Capitol Records, 1976)

With Cate Brothers

- Cate Bros. (Asylum Records, 1975)
- In One Eye and Out the Order (Asylum Records, 1976)

With Chicago

- Chicago XXXIII: O Christmas Three (Chicago Records, 2011)

With David Clayton-Thomas

- David Clayton-Thomas (Columbia Records, 1972)

With A. J. Croce

- Just Like Medicine (Compass Records, 2017)

With Patti Dahlstrom

- Your Place or Mine (20th Century Records, 1975)

With Delaney & Bonnie

- Home (Stax Records, 1969)
- D&B Together (Columbia Records, 1972)

With Ned Doheny

- Hard Candy (Columbia Records, 1976)
- Prone (CBS Records, 1979)

With Yvonne Elliman

- Rising Sun (RSO Records, 1975)
- Night Flight (RSO Records, 1978)
- Yvonne (RSO Records, 1979)

With José Feliciano

- Compartments (RCA Victor, 1973)
- For My Love... Mother Music (RCA Victor, 1974)

With Eddie Floyd

- Knock on Wood (Stax Records, 1967)
- Down to Earth (Stax Records, 1971)

With Peter Frampton

- Where I Should Be (A&M Records, 1979)

With Richie Furay

- I've Got a Reason (Asylum Records, 1976)

With Art Garfunkel

- Breakaway (Columbia Records, 1975)

With Cyndi Grecco

- Making Our Dreams Come True (Private Stock Records, 1976)

With Richie Havens

- The End of the Beginning (A&M Records, 1976)

With Levon Helm

- Levon Helm & the RCO All-Stars (ABC Records, 1977)
- Levon Helm (ABC Records, 1978)

With Chris Hillman

- Slippin' Away (Asylum Records, 1976)

With Rebecca Lynn Howard

- Rebecca Lynn Howard (Universal Music, 2000)

With Iron City Houserockers

- Blood on the Bricks (MCA Records, 1981)

With Etta James

- Seven Year Itch (Island Records, 1988)
- The Right Time (Elektra Records, 1992)

With Wynonna Judd

- Tell Me Why (Curb Records, 1993)

With Albert King

- Born Under a Bad Sign (Stax Records, 1967)
- Years Gone By (Stax Records, 1969)

With B. B. King

- King of the Blues: 1989 (MCA Records, 1988)

With Al Kooper

- White Chocolate (Sony Records, 2008)

With John Lennon

- Rock 'n' Roll (Apple Records, 1975)

With Ann-Margret

- Born to Be Wild (Cleopatra Records, 2023)

With Marilyn McCoo and Billy Davis Jr.

- Marilyn & Billy (Columbia Records, 1978)

With Craig Morgan

- Craig Morgan (Atlantic Records, 2000)

With Aaron Neville

- The Tattoeed Heart (A&M Records, 1995)

With Wayne Newton

- Tomorrow (Chelsea Records, 1976)

With Harry Nilsson

- Flash Harry (Mercury Records, 1980)

With John Oates

- 1000 Miles of Life (Phunk Shui Records, 2008)

With Nigel Olsson

- Nigel Olsson (The Rocket Record Company, 1975)

With Roy Orbison

- Mystery Girl (Virgin Records, 1989)

With Dolly Parton

- Heartbreak Express (RCA Records, 1982)

With Wilson Pickett

- In the Midnight Hour (Atlantic Records, 1965)
- The Exciting Wilson Pickett (Atlantic Records, 1966)

With Michel Polnareff

- Michel Polnareff (Atlantic Records, 1975)

With John Prine

- Common Sense (Atlantic Records, 1975)

With Otis Redding

- Pain in My Heart (Atco Records, 1964)
- The Great Otis Redding Sings Soul Ballads (Atco Records, 1965)
- Otis Blue/Otis Redding Sings Soul (Stax Records, 1965)
- The Soul Album (Stax Records, 1966)
- Complete & Unbelievable: The Otis Redding Dictionary of Soul (Stax Records, 1966)
- King & Queen (Stax Records, 1967)
- The Dock of the Bay (Stax Records, 1968)

With Bruce Roberts

- Bruce Roberts (Elektra Records, 1977)

With Leon Russell

- Will O' the Wisp (Shelter Records, 1975)

With Sanford & Townsend

- Duo-Glide (Warner Bros. Records, 1977)

With Leo Sayer

- Here (Chrysalis Records, 1979)

With Poncho Sanchez

- Raise Your Hand (Concord Records, 2007)

With Guy Sebastian

- The Memphis Album (Sony BMG, 2007)

With Neil Sedaka

- The Hungry Years (The Rocket Record Company, 1975)
- Steppin' Out (Polydor Records, 1976)

With Paul Shaffer

- Coast to Coast (Capitol Records, 1989)

With Paul Simon

- Songs from The Capeman (Warner Bros. Records, 1997)

With Percy Sledge

- Blue Night (Sky France Records, 1994)

With Broderick Smith

- Suitcase (Mushroom Records, 1992)

With The Soul Children

- Soul Children (Stax Records, 1968)

With The Staple Singers

- Soul Folk in Action (Stax Records, 1968)

With Mavis Staples

- Mavis Staples (Volt Records, 1969)
- Only for the Lonely (Volt Records, 1970)

With Ringo Starr

- Ringo (Apple Records, 1973)
- Goodnight Vienna (Apple Records, 1974)
- Vertical Man (Mercury Records, 1998)

With Rod Stewart

- Atlantic Crossing (Warner Bros. Records, 1975)
- A Night on the Town (Warner Bros. Records, 1976)
- Foot Loose & Fancy Free (Warner Bros. Records, 1977)
- Every Beat of My Heart (Warner Bros. Records, 1986)

With Livingston Taylor

- Man's Best Friend (Epic Records, 1980)

With Carla Thomas

- Memphis Queen (Stax Records, 1969)

With Mickey Thomas

- As Long as You Love Me (MCA Records, 1977)

With Tower of Power

- We Came to Play! (Columbia Records, 1978)

With The Manhattan Transfer

- Pastiche (Atlantic Records, 1978)

With Wendy Waldman

- The Main Refrain (Warner Bros. Records, 1976)

With Dale Watson

- Jukebox Fury (Cleopatra Records, 2022)

With Jerry Lynn Williams

- Gone (Warner Bros. Records, 1979)

== Filmography ==
- 1980: The Blues Brothers as himself
- 1988: Satisfaction as Sal
- 1999: Blues Brothers 2000 as himself
- 2008: Be Kind Rewind as himself
- 2017: Rock 'n' Roll Guns for Hire: The Story of the Sidemen as himself
