= Al Jackson Jr. =

American drummer (1935–1975)

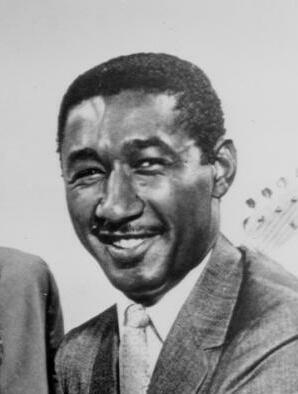
- Jackson in 1967

Background information
- Born: Albert J. Jackson Jr. November 27, 1935; Memphis, Tennessee, U.S.
- Died: October 1, 1975 (aged 39) Memphis, Tennessee, U.S.
- Genres: R&B, funk, soul, Memphis soul
- Instruments: Drums, percussion
- Years active: 1940–1975
- Formerly of: Booker T. & the M.G.'s

Albert J. Jackson Jr. (November 27, 1935 – October 1, 1975) was an American drummer, producer, and songwriter. He was a founding member of Booker T. & the M.G.'s, a group of session musicians who worked for Stax Records and produced their own instrumentals. Jackson was affectionately dubbed "The Human Timekeeper" for his drumming ability. He was posthumously inducted into the Memphis Music Hall of Fame in 2015, and the Rock and Roll Hall of Fame as a member of Booker T. & the M.G.'s in 1992.

== Early life ==
Jackson's father, Al Jackson Sr., led a jazz/swing dance band in Memphis, Tennessee. The young Jackson started drumming at an early age and began playing on stage with his father's band in 1940, at the age of five. He later played in producer and trumpeter Willie Mitchell's band and at the same time was holding down a chair in the popular Ben Branch Band.

In an interview with Drum! magazine, Mitchell recalled,

Al Junior was about 14 years old then. I said to his father, 'Hey, let's use your son!' He said, 'Oh, man, he can't play this stuff!' But he did make the gig. He set up his kit – a cymbal, a snare drum, and a bass drum – and I kicked the thing off. And, man, that thing went off at 20 tempos!

But that was around 7:00 o'clock. And by the time Al Senior came in an hour later, at 8:00 o'clock, Al Jackson Jr. was swinging that damn band like a pro.

Future bandmates Steve Cropper and Donald "Duck" Dunn first heard Jackson playing in Mitchell's band at the Flamingo Room, and the all-white Manhattan Club. Mitchell had also hired Booker T. Jones for his band. It was Jones who suggested Jackson be brought to Stax. He said, "You guys need to know about Al." Dunn said that Jackson almost caused his wife to divorce him, because after finishing his own gig at one o'clock, he would stop by a club to hear Jackson and would get home at four or five in the morning; "He was that good!" said Dunn. At first, Jackson was reluctant to join Stax. He felt he could make more money playing live than doing session work. He wanted a guaranteed regular salary to come over to Stax (although he continued to play on sessions produced by Mitchell for Hi Records). And so he became the first Stax session musician to be on a weekly salary.

== Career ==
At Stax, Jackson formed the M.G.'s with Booker T. Jones, Steve Cropper and Lewie Steinberg (later to be replaced by Duck Dunn). During his tenure at Stax, he became one of the most influential drummers in the history of recorded music, providing an instantly recognizable backbeat behind the label's artists, including Rufus Thomas, Carla Thomas, Eddie Floyd, Sam & Dave, Otis Redding and blues guitarist Albert King (whose work Jackson also produced).

In the 1970s, he co-wrote and played on several hits by Al Green, including "Let's Stay Together" and "I'm Still in Love with You", at Hi, and he was also a session drummer for many artists, such as Elvis Presley, Bill Withers, Wilson Pickett, Leon Russell, Jerry Lee Lewis, Eric Clapton, Jean Knight, Aretha Franklin, Major Lance, Ann Peebles, Rod Stewart, Shirley Brown, Donny Hathaway and Herbie Mann.

In 1975, four years after the release of their last album, Melting Pot, the members of Booker T. & the M.G.'s decided to wrap up their individual projects and devote three years to a reunion of the band. A few months later, Jackson was murdered in his home.

== Death ==
On September 30, 1975, Jackson was scheduled to fly from Memphis to Detroit, to produce a Major Lance session, but he delayed the session so he could watch the "Thrilla in Manila" on the big screen at the Mid-South Coliseum. After the fight, Jackson returned to the home he shared with his estranged wife, Barbara Jackson. That July, Barbara Jackson had shot her husband in the chest after he had assaulted her, with attempted murder charges against Barbara Jackson being dropped when a Memphis City court judge determined she had acted in self-defense. Al Jackson had since started the process of filing for a divorce and was intending to move.

At approximately 11:00 p.m., Barbara Jackson had returned home from a beauty parlor and was ambushed inside the home by a single black male who demanded money before restraining her while he searched the house. Al Jackson soon returned home and was accosted by the intruder, who forced Jackson to lie on the floor before shooting him multiple times with a pistol. Barbara Jackson managed to free herself enough to leave the house, where a police sergeant passing by saw her. Police found Jackson dead from five gunshots in the back. The killer, described as a "tall black man, 25–30 years old, with an Afro haircut and a moustache", had fled with some jewelry and the contents of Jackson's pockets. He would never be identified.

Various theories have been proposed for the motivation behind Jackson's murder. Some believe he was simply in the wrong place at the wrong time; others believe the murder was tied to an alleged lawsuit against Stax Records over unpaid royalties, but Jackson's former bandmates have all dismissed this theory. Various theories have also implicated Barbara Jackson, who was initially investigated by the police as a suspect, as well as her friend, singer Denise LaSalle, who was later accused of harboring a fugitive wanted for armed robbery, but no charges in Jackson's death have ever been filed.

== Equipment ==
For recording Jackson typically used various combinations of Ludwig and Rogers drums and Zildjian cymbals. Two studio kits played by Jackson are on display in museums; a Ludwig kit (with a Rogers Powertone snare drum) from Stax Records in the Musicians Hall of Fame & Museum, and a Rogers kit (with a Ludwig Acrolite snare drum) from Hi Records in the Stax Museum.

According to Steve Cropper, as quoted in Give the Drummer Some! by Jim Payne, a grey pearl Rogers floor tom was used in the mix 'n' match kit at Stax.

== Collaborations ==
With The Rance Allen Group

- A Soulful Experience (Truth Records, 1975)

With William Bell

- The Soul of a Bell (Stax Records, 1967)
- Bound to Happen (Stax Records, 1969)
- Relating (Stax Records, 1974)

With Shirley Brown

- Woman to Woman (Truth Records, 1974)

With Booker T. & the M.G.'s

- Green Onions (Stax Records, 1962)
- Soul Dressing (Stax Records, 1965)
- And Now! (Stax Records, 1966)
- In the Christmas Spirit (Stax Records, 1966)
- Hip Hug-Her (Stax Records, 1967)
- Doin' Our Thing (Stax Records, 1968)
- Soul Limbo (Stax Records, 1968)
- UpTight (Stax Records, 1969)
- The Booker T. Set (Stax Records, 1969)
- McLemore Avenue (Stax Records, 1970)
- Melting Pot (Stax Records, 1971)

With Eric Clapton

- 461 Ocean Boulevard (RSO Records, 1974)

With Delaney & Bonnie

- Home (Stax Records, 1969)

With The Emotions

- Sunshine (Stax Records, 1977)

With Eddie Floyd

- Knock on Wood (Stax Records, 1967)

With Aretha Franklin

- Young, Gifted and Black (Atlantic Records, 1972)

With Alan Gerber

- The Alan Gerber Album (Shelter Records, 1971)

With Al Green

- Green Is Blues (Hi Records, 1969)
- Al Green Gets Next to You (Hi Records, 1971)
- Let's Stay Together (Hi Records, 1972)
- I'm Still in Love with You (Hi Records, 1972)
- Call Me (Hi Records, 1973)
- Livin' for You (Hi Records, 1973)

With Donny Hathaway

- Donny Hathaway (Atco Records, 1971)

With Albert King

- Born Under a Bad Sign (Stax Records, 1967)
- Years Gone By (Stax Records, 1969)
- The Blues Don't Change (Stax Records, 1974)

With Wilson Pickett

- In the Midnight Hour (Atlantic Records, 1965)
- The Exciting Wilson Pickett (Atlantic Records, 1966)

With David Porter

- Victim of the Joke? An Opera (Enterprise Records, 1971)

With Elvis Presley

- Raised on Rock / For Ol' Times Sake (RCA Records, 1973)

With Otis Redding

- Pain in My Heart (Atco Records, 1964)
- The Great Otis Redding Sings Soul Ballads (Volt Records, 1965)
- Otis Blue/Otis Redding Sings Soul (Volt Records, 1965)
- The Soul Album (Volt Records, 1966)
- Complete & Unbelievable: The Otis Redding Dictionary of Soul (Volt Records, 1966)
- King & Queen (Volt Records, 1967)
- The Dock of the Bay (Volt Records, 1968)

With Leon Russell

- Will O' the Wisp (Shelter Records, 1975)

With The Soul Children

- Genesis (Stax Records, 1972)
- Friction (Stax Records, 1974)

With The Staple Singers

- Soul Folk in Action (Stax Records, 1968)

With Mavis Staples

- Mavis Staples (Volt Records, 1969)
- Only for the Lonely (Volt Records, 1970)

With Rod Stewart

- Atlantic Crossing (Warner Bros. Records, 1975)
- A Night on the Town (Warner Bros. Records, 1976)

With Carla Thomas

- Memphis Queen (Stax Records, 1969)
- Love Means... (Stax Records, 1971)

With Bill Withers

- Just as I Am (Sussex Records, 1971)
