= The Essential Boz Scaggs =

Compilation album by Boz Scaggs
- Released: October 29, 2013
- Recorded: 1969–2013
- Genre: Rock; blues; rhythm and blues; pop
- Length: 2:35:49
- Label: Columbia; Legacy
- Producer: Jann Wenner; Glyn Johns; Boz Scaggs; Roy Halee; Johnny Bristol; Joe Wissert; Bill Schnee; Stewart Levine; David Williams; Ricky Fataar; David Paich; Danny Kortchmar; Steve Jordan

Boz Scaggs chronology
Memphis (2013)	The Essential Boz Scaggs (2013)	A Fool to Care (2015)

The Essential Boz Scaggs is a compilation album by American musician and songwriter Boz Scaggs, released in 2013. The album includes songs from his studio albums from 1969 to 2013.

== Reception ==
Professional ratings
Review scores
Source	Rating
AllMusic	4.5/5 stars
PopMatters	7/10

Stephen Thomas Erlewine from AllMusic considered the album to be superior to the 1997 compilation My Time: A Boz Scaggs Anthology and that the record was "something close to a truly essential Boz Scaggs".

== Track listing ==
All tracks written by Boz Scaggs, except where noted.

Disc one

No.	Title	Writer(s)	Album	Length
1.	"I'll Be Long Gone"		Boz Scaggs	4:04
2.	"Loan Me a Dime"	Fenton Robinson	Boz Scaggs	13:04
3.	"Runnin' Blue"	Scaggs, Pat O'Hara	Boz Scaggs & Band	3:58
4.	"We Were Always Sweethearts"		Moments	3:30
5.	"Painted Bells"		Moments	4:03
6.	"Near You"		Moments	5:00
7.	"Dinah Flo"		My Time	3:05
8.	"Might Have to Cry"		My Time	4:05
9.	"You Make It So Hard (To Say No)"		Slow Dancer	3:34
10.	"Slow Dancer"	Scaggs, George Daly	Slow Dancer	3:15
11.	"What Can I Say"	Scaggs, David Paich	Silk Degrees	3:01
12.	"It's Over"	Scaggs, Paich	Silk Degrees	2:52
13.	"Harbor Lights"		Silk Degrees	5:58
14.	"Lowdown"	Scaggs, Paich	Silk Degrees	5:18
15.	"Lido Shuffle"	Scaggs, Paich	Silk Degrees	3:43
16.	"We're All Alone"		Silk Degrees	4:14
17.	"Hard Times"		Down Two Then Left	4:30
Total length:				1:17:15

Disc two

No.	Title	Writer(s)	Album	Length
1.	"Jojo"	Scaggs, David Foster, David Lasley	Middle Man	5:55
2.	"Isn't It Time"		Middle Man	4:55
3.	"Simone"	Scaggs, Foster	Middle Man	5:10
4.	"Breakdown Dead Ahead"	Scaggs, Foster	Middle Man	4:37
5.	"Miss Sun"	Paich	Hits!	5:32
6.	"Look What You've Done to Me"	Scaggs, Foster	Hits!	5:18
7.	"Heart of Mine"	Bobby Caldwell, Dennis Matkosky, Jason Scheff	Other Roads	4:14
8.	"Some Change"		Some Change	6:12
9.	"Sierra"		Some Change	3:44
10.	"As the Years Go Passing By" (Live with Booker T. & the MG's)	Don Robey	My Time: A Boz Scaggs Anthology	4:46
11.	"It All Went Down the Drain"	Earl King	Come On Home	5:34
12.	"Miss Riddle"	Scaggs, Paich, Michael Rodriguez	Dig	6:28
13.	"I Just Go"		Dig	3:37
14.	"Thanks to You"	Scaggs, Paich	Dig	4:50
15.	"Gone Baby Gone"		Memphis	3:35
Total length:				1:18:33

== Personnel ==
- Boz Scaggs – guitar, vocals
- Booker T & The MG's – band (disc 2, track 10)
- Fred Tackett – guitar
- Louis Shelton – guitar
- David Hungate – bass
- Jeff Porcaro – drums
- David Paich – Hammond organ, piano, Minimoog, Moog synthesizer
- Vincent DeRosa – horns
- Jim Horn – horns
- Paul Hubinon – horns
- Dick Hyde – horns
- Plas Johnson – horns
- Tom Scott – horns
- Bud Shank – horns

== Release history ==
Country	Date	Label	Format	Catalog
United States	2013	Columbia Records, Legacy Records	CD, digital download	88883741212 / 88883741212
