= Hits! (Boz Scaggs album) =

Greatest hits album by Boz Scaggs
- Released: November 1980
- Recorded: 1972–1980
- Studios: Muscle Shoals Sound Studio (Sheffield); Davlen Sound Studios (North Hollywood); Devonshire Sound Studios (North Hollywood); Studio 55 (Los Angeles)
- Length: 42:47; 64:56 (2006 re-release)
- Labels: Columbia; Legacy Records
- Producers: Johnny Bristol; Joe Wissert; Bill Schnee; Glyn Johns; David Foster

Boz Scaggs chronology
Middle Man (1980)	Hits! (1980)	Other Roads (1988)

Hits!
- 2006 re-issued cover (Legacy Records)

Singles from Hits!
- 1. "Miss Sun" Released: 1 November 1980

Hits! is a compilation album by Boz Scaggs, first released in November 1980. It focuses primarily on material released in 1976 and 1980. The album has been certified platinum by the RIAA. The cover photograph was taken in 1980 by renowned photographer Albert Watson.

== Reception ==
Professional ratings
Review scores
Source	Rating
AllMusic	4/5 stars

In a retrospective review by Jason Elias for AllMusic, he criticized the album's lack of comprehensiveness, particularly the omission of "What Can I Say". Elias deemed that the later release My Time: A Boz Scaggs Anthology makes Hits! completely redundant.

== Track listing ==
All tracks are written by Boz Scaggs, except where noted.

Side one
No.	Title	Writer(s)	Original release	Length
1.	"Lowdown"	Scaggs; David Paich	Silk Degrees, 1976	4:27
2.	"You Make It So Hard (to Say No)"		Slow Dancer, 1974	3:32
3.	"Miss Sun"	Paich	New song	3:58
4.	"Lido Shuffle"	Scaggs; Paich	Silk Degrees, 1976	3:41
5.	"We're All Alone"		Silk Degrees, 1976	4:11

Side two
No.	Title	Writer(s)	Original release	Length
6.	"Breakdown Dead Ahead"	Scaggs; David Foster	Middle Man, 1980	4:01
7.	"Look What You've Done to Me"	Scaggs; Foster	Urban Cowboy, 1980	5:17
8.	"Jojo"	Scaggs; Foster; David Lasley	Middle Man, 1980	4:06
9.	"Dinah Flo"		My Time, 1972	3:03
10.	"You Can Have Me Anytime"	Scaggs; Foster	Middle Man, 1980	4:56
Total length:				42:47

The Australian release replaced "Dinah Flo" with "What Can I Say".

=== Re-release ===
In 2006 Hits! was re-released with additional tracks and a new cover.

No.	Title	Writer(s)	Original release	Length
1.	"What Can I Say"	Scaggs; Paich	Silk Degrees, 1976	3:00
2.	"Jojo"	Scaggs; Foster; Lasley	Middle Man, 1980	5:52
3.	"Miss Sun" (Long Version)	Paich	New song	5:32
4.	"Hard Times"		Down Two Then Left, 1977	4:31
5.	"Slow Dancer"	Scaggs; George Daly	Slow Dancer, 1974	3:13
6.	"Harbor Lights"		Silk Degrees, 1976	5:56
7.	"Dinah Flo"		My Time, 1972	3:04
8.	"Look What You've Done to Me"	Scaggs; Foster	Urban Cowboy, 1980	5:17
9.	"Breakdown Dead Ahead"	Scaggs; Foster	Middle Man, 1980	4:35
10.	"You Make It So Hard (to Say No)"		Slow Dancer, 1974	3:33
11.	"It's Over"	Scaggs; Paich	Silk Degrees, 1976	2:50
12.	"We're All Alone"		Silk Degrees, 1976	4:14
13.	"Heart of Mine"	Bobby Caldwell; Dennis Matkosky; Jason Scheff	Other Roads, 1988	4:12
14.	"Lowdown"	Scaggs; Paich	Silk Degrees, 1976	5:17
15.	"Lido Shuffle"	Scaggs; Paich	Silk Degrees, 1976	3:43
Total length:				64:56

== Personnel ==
=== Musicians ===
- Boz Scaggs – lead vocals, guitar (2, 4, 6, 8, 9)
- Fred Tackett – guitar (1, 4), guitar solo (1)
- Louie Shelton – guitar (1)
- David T. Walker – guitar (2)
- Dennis Coffey – guitar (2)
- Wah Wah Watson – guitar (2)
- Steve Lukather – guitar (3, 6–8), guitar solo (6)
- Ray Parker Jr. – guitar (6, 8)
- Don Felder – guitar (7)
- Pete Carr – guitar (9)
- Eddie Hinton – acoustic guitar (9)
- Jimmy Johnson – electric guitar (9)
- Carlos Santana – guitar solo (10)
- David Paich – keyboards (1, 3–5), synthesizers (3, 4), Moog bass (3), synthesizer solo (4), string arrangements (1, 5), horn arrangements (1, 4, 5)
- Joe Sample – keyboards (2)
- Clarence McDonald – keyboards (2)
- Steve Porcaro – synthesizers (3)
- David Foster – keyboards (6–8), synthesizers (8, 10), piano (10), strings arrangements (7, 8)
- Don Grolnick – electric piano (6)
- Clayton Ivey – organ (9), keyboards (9)
- Barry Beckett – piano (9)
- David Hungate – bass (1, 4–6, 10)
- James Jamerson – bass (2)
- Mike Porcaro – bass (7)
- John Pierce – bass (8)
- David Hood – bass (9)
- Jeff Porcaro – drums (1, 3–5, 7, 8, 10), percussion (3)
- James Gadson – drums (2)
- Rick Marotta – drums (6)
- Roger Hawkins – drums (9)
- Lenny Castro – percussion (6, 8)
- Adrian Tapia – saxophone solo (8)
- Charles Chalmers – saxophone (9), backing vocals (9)
- Muscle Shoals Horns – horns (9), horns arrangements (9)
- Carolyn Willis – backing vocals (1, 2)
- Marty McCall – backing vocals (1)
- Jim Gilstrap – backing vocals (1)
- Augie Johnson – backing vocals (1)
- Julia Tillman Waters – backing vocals (2)
- Lorna Willard – backing vocals (2)
- Myrna Matthews – backing vocals (2)
- Pat Henderson – backing vocals (2)
- Lisa Dal Bello – vocals (3)
- Paulette Brown – backing vocals (6)
- Venetta Fields – backing vocals (6)
- Bill Thedford – backing vocals (6)
- Glenn Frey – backing vocals (7)
- Don Henley – backing vocals (7)
- Timothy B. Schmit – backing vocals (7)
- David Lasley – backing vocals (8)
- Sharon Redd – backing vocals (8)
- Charlotte Crossley – backing vocals (8)
- Sandra Chalmers – backing vocals (9)
- Donna Rhodes – backing vocals (9)
- H.B. Barnum – string arrangements (2), conductor (2)
- Jerry Hey – horns arrangements (8)
- Marty Paich – strings arrangements (10)

=== Technical ===
- Produced by Joe Wissert (1, 4, 5), Johnny Bristol (2), Bill Schnee (3, 6, 7, 8, 10), David Foster (7), Roy Halee (9), and Boz Scaggs (9)
- Engineered by Tom Perry (1, 4, 5), Al Schmitt (2), Greg Venable (2), Bill Schnee (3, 6, 7, 8, 10), and Roy Halee (9)
- Mastered by Mike Reese and Lois Walker at The Mastering Lab (Hollywood, CA)
- Photography – Albert Watson
- Design – John Casado

== Charts ==
=== Weekly charts ===
Chart (1980–1981)	Peak position
Australia Albums (Kent Music Report)	9
New Zealand Albums (RMNZ)	16
US Billboard 200	24

=== Year-end charts ===
Chart (1981)	Position
US Billboard 200	83

== Certifications ==
Region	Certification	Certified units/sales
United States (RIAA)	Platinum	1,000,000^{^}
^{^} Shipments figures based on certification alone.
