= Memphis (Boz Scaggs album) =

Studio album by Boz Scaggs
- Released: March 5, 2013
- Recorded: 2012
- Studio: Royal Studios, Memphis, Tennessee
- Genre: Blues, rock, rhythm and blues
- Length: 47:30 (standard edition)
- Label: 429 Records
- Producer: Steve Jordan

Boz Scaggs chronology
Speak Low (2008)	Memphis (2013)	The Essential Boz Scaggs (2013)

Memphis is the seventeenth studio album by American singer-songwriter Boz Scaggs. It was Scaggs's first solo release since 2008's Speak Low. The album was released on March 5, 2013, by 429 Records. The album has debuted on Billboard 200 at No. 17, and has sold 90,000 copies in the US as of March 2015.

== Critical reception ==
Professional ratings
Review scores
Source	Rating
AllMusic	4/5 stars

Thom Jurek of AllMusic gave the album a positive review with 4 of 5 stars, describing the record as "a stunner. Scaggs is in full possession of that iconic voice; he delivers songs with an endemic empathy and intimacy that make them sound like living, breathing stories."

JazzTimes reviewer Christopher Louden wrote, "Among postmillennial vocal-jazz developments, near the top of the list is Boz Scaggs’ reemergence as a richly gifted interpreter of standards. Now Scaggs takes a slight detour, physically and stylistically, landing at Memphis’ fabled Royal Studios for a stellar assortment of soul and country covers . . . His distinctive voice, with its trademark nasal twang, remains remarkably strong, showing little if any deterioration since the days of Silk Degrees and Down Two Then Left. The playlist draws almost exclusively from that same era".

== Track listing ==
Most of the songs on the album were previously released by other singers.

A two-disc version of the album was released for exclusive distribution by Barnes & Noble in the United States. The second disc contains six demos, three of which were recorded as fully produced versions for the final release of the album and three of which were not.

No.	Title	Writer(s)	Original artist	Length
1.	"Gone Baby Gone"	Boz Scaggs	Initial release	3:36
2.	"So Good to be Here"	Michael Allen, Al Green	Al Green	3:15
3.	"Mixed Up, Shook Up Girl"	Willy DeVille	Mink DeVille	3:44
4.	"Rainy Night in Georgia"	Tony Joe White	Tony Joe White	4:34
5.	"Love on a Two Way Street"	BB Keys, Sylvia Robinson	Lezli Valentine	3:36
6.	"Pearl of the Quarter"	Walter Becker, Donald Fagen	Steely Dan	3:28
7.	"Cadillac Walk"	Moon Martin	Moon Martin	4:27
8.	"Corrina, Corrina"	Traditional	Bo Carter	3:45
9.	"Can I Change My Mind"	Barry Despenza, Carl Wolfolk	Tyrone Davis	4:19
10.	"Dry Spell"	Jack Walroth	Initial release	3:24
11.	"You Got Me Cryin'"	Ewart Abner, Jimmy Reed	Jimmy Reed	4:55
12.	"Sunny Gone"	Boz Scaggs	Initial release	4:32

Barnes & Noble Exclusive Edition Disc 2
No.	Title	Writer(s)	Original artist	Length
1.	"Cadillac Walk" (Demo)	Moon Martin	Moon Martin
2.	"I ain't Got You" (Demo)	Calvin Carter	Billy Boy Arnold
3.	"Dry Spell" (Demo)	Jack Walroth	Initial release
4.	"Educated Fool" (Demo)	Jack Walroth	Initial release
5.	"Mixed Up, Shook Up Girl" (Demo)	Willy DeVille	Mink DeVille
6.	"It Takes a Lot to Laugh" (Demo)	Bob Dylan	Bob Dylan

== Personnel ==
- Boz Scaggs – lead and backing vocals, acoustic guitar (1–8, 10, 12), electric guitar (1–8, 10, 12), guitars (11)
- Jim Cox – Rhodes electric piano (1, 5), acoustic piano (3, 5–7, 12), Wurlitzer electric piano (6), organ (12)
- Charles Hodges – organ (2, 5, 6, 9), Wurlitzer electric piano (4)
- Lester Snell – Wurlitzer electric piano (2, 9), string arrangements (2, 6), horn arrangements (6)
- Spooner Oldham – Wurlitzer electric piano (3, 5, 8, 10), acoustic piano (4), organ (4)
- Ray Parker Jr. – acoustic guitar (1–8, 10, 12), electric guitar (1–8, 10, 12)
- Eddie Willis – guitars (9)
- Keb' Mo' – slide dobro (10)
- Rick Vito – guitar (11)
- Willie Weeks – bass guitar (1–10, 12, upright bass (2, 4, 6)
- David Hungate – bass guitar (11)
- Steve Jordan – drums (1–10, 12), percussion (1–10, 12), horn arrangements (2), string arrangements (4), backing vocals
- Shannon Forrest – drums (11)
- Jack Ashford – vibraphone (5)
- Jim Horn – baritone saxophone (2, 6)
- Lannie McMillan – tenor saxophone (2, 6)
- Jack Hale – trombone (2, 6)
- Ben Cauley – trumpet (2, 6)
- Charlie Musselwhite – harmonica (10, 11)
- Willie Mitchell – string arrangements (2)
- Jonathan Kirkscey – cello (2, 4, 6)
- Mark Wallace – cello (2, 4, 6)
- Beth Luscome – viola (2, 4, 6)
- Jennifer Puckett – viola (2, 4, 6)
- Barrie Cooper – violin (2, 4, 6)
- Jessie Munson – violin (2, 4, 6)
- Wen-Yih Yu – violin (2, 4, 6)
- Monét Owens – backing vocals, lead vocals (9)
- Claytoven Richardson – backing vocals

=== Production ===
- Steve Jordan – producer, engineer, mixing
- Niko Bolas – engineer, mixing
- Lawrence "Boo" Mitchell – additional recording
- Michael Rodriguez – additional recording
- Chris Taberez – additional recording, Pro Tools engineer
- Artie Smith – technician
- Greg Calbi – mastering
- Steve Fallone – additional mastering
- David Alan Kogut – art direction
- Deborah Feingold – photography
- Matt McGinley – photography assistant
- Joel Hoffner – management
- Ken Levitan – management
- Jack Rovner – management

Studios

- Recorded at Royal Recording Studios (Memphis, Tennessee) and The Barn (Napa Valley, California).
- Mastered at Sterling Sound (New York City, New York).
