= Middle Man (album) =

Studio album by Boz Scaggs
- Released: April 1980
- Recorded: 1979
- Studios: Studio 55 (Los Angeles); Sunset Sound (Hollywood); Cherokee (Hollywood); Producer's Workshop (Hollywood)
- Genres: Pop; rock
- Length: 42:02
- Label: Columbia
- Producer: Bill Schnee

Boz Scaggs chronology
Down Two Then Left (1977)	Middle Man (1980)	Hits! (1980)

Singles from Middle Man
- 1. "Breakdown Dead Ahead" Released: 1980; 2. "Jojo" Released: 1980

Middle Man is the ninth studio album by Boz Scaggs, released by Columbia Records in 1980. Scaggs hired members of the band Toto as session musicians (as he did for Down Two Then Left and Silk Degrees) and shared songwriting credits with them, returning to the commercial, soul-influenced rock of the latter. It would take him eight years to release his following album Other Roads, again retaining the personnel of the three preceding it.

The album reached No. 8 in the Billboard 200 album chart, and two singles reached the Billboard Hot 100: "Breakdown Dead Ahead" at No. 15 and "Jojo" at No. 17.

== Background ==
Following the success of his 1976 album Silk Degrees and its 1977 follow-up Down Two Then Left, Boz Scaggs sought a new musical direction and collaborated extensively with keyboardist and songwriter David Foster on this album. Foster contributed arrangements and co-writing, with the collaboration facilitated by producer Bill Schnee, who was acquainted with both musicians. In an interview, Scaggs explained that he was more interested in exploring new musical directions than attempting to repeat the success of his previous releases.

The album featured several session musicians who were members of Toto, including Steve Lukather, Jeff Porcaro and David Hungate. They had previously worked with Scaggs on earlier albums and contributed to the album's performances and arrangements. Guitarist Carlos Santana also performed a guitar solo on "You Can Have Me Anytime".

Recording took place in 1979 at several studios in Los Angeles, including Studio 55, Cherokee Studios, Sunset Sound and Producers Workshop. Bill Schnee handled production and engineering.

Musically, Middle Man combines elements of soul, funk, rhythm and blues and pop rock, highlighting Scaggs's smooth vocals and sophisticated arrangements. "Jojo" and "Breakdown Dead Ahead" feature prominent rhythmic rock and funk influences, while "You Can Have Me Anytime" and "Isn't It Time" are ballads characterised by elaborate arrangements. The title track, "Middle Man", and "Angel You" also incorporate synthesizers, reflecting contemporary pop music trends of the period.

Middle Man was released in April 1980 and became Scaggs's final studio album for Columbia Records. He subsequently went approximately eight years without releasing a studio album before returning with Other Roads in 1988.

== Reception ==
Professional ratings
Review scores
Source	Rating
AllMusic	3/5 stars
Smash Hits	5/10
DownBeat	4.5/5 stars

Writing for Smash Hits in 1980, David Hepworth described Middle Man as an "impeccably tasteful collection of sophisticated white soul" that was "useful as background music in the more sedate kind of nite spot". Acknowledging that the album was "well done", Hepworth noted that Scaggs' previous albums were "thrilling as well as perfectly formed". Hepworth went on to say that the album sounded as though "they designed the sleeve first and then made the record to go in it". Interestingly, two cuts from the album, "Jojo" and "Breakdown Dead Ahead", landed higher on the Canadian charts than on any other international or US charts, indicating that Canadian audiences had embraced Scaggs' harder rock edge, diverging from slower ballads and hits such as "Look What You've Done To Me", which he deftly wrote in the same year, as a track for the movie Urban Cowboy.

AllMusic's retrospective review commented that the album "caps off the decade with equal nods to [Scaggs's] '70s hitmaking formulas and the newer, shinier production techniques of the coming decade." They made a point of noting the album's repeated imitation of then-popular fads, while at the same time, opining that these imitations were successful.

Writing for DownBeat, Alan Morrison heavily praised this release (4.5 stars), calling it more sophisticated, focused and better produced than Scaggs' previous releases. He singled out "Simone" as a "pop masterpiece". Morrison also praised David Foster for his lyrics, Bill Schnee's production values, and the excellent contribution of the session musicians.

== Track listing ==
All tracks are written by Boz Scaggs and David Foster, except where noted.

Side one
No.	Title	Writer(s)	Length
1.	"Jojo"	Scaggs; Foster; David Lasley	5:51
2.	"Breakdown Dead Ahead"		4:33
3.	"Simone"		5:05
4.	"You Can Have Me Anytime"		4:56

Side two
No.	Title	Writer(s)	Length
5.	"Middle Man"		4:51
6.	"Do Like You Do in New York"	Scaggs	3:44
7.	"Angel You"		3:38
8.	"Isn't It Time"	Scaggs	4:53
9.	"You Got Some Imagination"	Scaggs; Steve Lukather; Bill Schnee	3:56
Total length:			42:02

== Personnel ==
Credits adapted from the album's liner notes.

=== Principal musicians ===
- Boz Scaggs – lead vocals, guitar (1–8)
- David Foster – piano (1–5, 7), synthesizers (1, 3, 5, 7–9), string arrangements (1, 3–5, 8), electric piano (3, 4, 8), synthesizer programming
- David Hungate – bass (2–5, 7–9)
- Steve Lukather – guitar (1–3, 5–9), guitar solo (2, 7, 8)
- Ray Parker Jr. – guitar (1–8), bass (6)
- Jeff Porcaro – drums (1, 3–5, 7, 9)

==== Additional musicians ====
- Larry Fast – synthesizer programming
- Michael Boddicker – synthesizer programming
- Steve Porcaro – synthesizer programming
- Lenny Castro – percussion
- John Pierce – bass (1)
- Adrian Tapia – saxophone solo (1)
- Rick Marotta – drums (2, 8)
- Joe Vitale – drums (6)
- Don Grolnick – electric piano (2), piano (8)
- David Paich – synthesizers (3, 6), organ (6)
- James Newton Howard – clavinet (6)
- Carlos Santana – guitar solo (4)
- Marty Paich – string arrangements (4)
- Charlotte Crossley – backing vocals (1)
- David Lasley – backing vocals (1, 6)
- Sharon Redd – backing vocals (1)
- Paulette Brown – backing vocals (2, 3, 5, 8, 9)
- Venetta Fields – backing vocals (2, 3, 5, 8, 9)
- Bill Thedford – backing vocals (2, 3, 8)
- Julia Tillman Waters – backing vocals (5, 9)
- Oren Waters – backing vocals (5, 9)
- Bill Champlin – backing vocals (6)
- Chuck "Fingers" Irwin – backing vocals (6)
- Rosemary Butler – backing vocals (7, 8)

=== Technical ===
- Produced and engineered by Bill Schnee
- Assistant engineers – Gabe Veltri and Stephen Marcussen
- Mastered by Doug Sax and Mike Reese at The Mastering Lab (Los Angeles, CA)
- Photography – Guy Bourdin
- Design – Nancy Donald
- Management – Irv Azoff

== Charts ==
=== Weekly charts ===
Chart (1980)	Peak position
Australia (Kent Music Report)	11
Canada Top Albums/CDs (RPM)	14
Dutch Albums (Album Top 100)	38
New Zealand Albums (RMNZ)	10
Norwegian Albums (VG-lista)	17
UK Albums (Official Charts)	52
US Billboard 200	8
US Top R&B/Hip-Hop Albums (Billboard)	36

=== Year-end charts ===
Chart (1980)	Position
Australia (Kent Music Report)	21
Canada Top Albums/CDs (RPM)	69
US Billboard 200	37

== Certifications ==
Region	Certification	Certified units/sales
United States (RIAA)	Platinum	1,000,000^{^}
^{^} Shipments figures based on certification alone.
