= Valli (album) =

Studio album by Frankie Valli
- Released: March 1976
- Recorded: 1975–1976
- Genre: Pop rock, disco
- Length: 38:05
- Label: Private Stock
- Producer: Bob Gaudio

Frankie Valli chronology
Our Day Will Come (1975)	Valli (1976)	Lady Put the Light Out (1977)

Valli is the sixth solo LP album by Frankie Valli of The Four Seasons, released by Private Stock under catalog number PS-2017 as a stereo recording in 1976. It was reissued on compact disc in 2008, paired with his first solo effort from Private Stock, Closeup, by Collector's Choice.

The LP yielded one hit single, "We're All Alone." It reached #78 U.S. Billboard, #74 Cash Box and #73 in Canada. Despite the single’s moderate success, the album failed to make the charts.

== Track listing ==
Track	Song	Composer	Time
1	"Easily"	Billy Alessi, Bobby Alessi	4:00
2	"We're All Alone"	Boz Scaggs	4:01
3	"Can't Get You Off My Mind"	Iran Koster, Victoria Pike, Teddy Randazzo	3:47
4	"So She Says"	Billy Alessi, Bobby Alessi	3:50
5	"Lucia"	Richard Cocciante, Marco Juberti, Danielle Rouby	4:04
6	"Boomerang"	Victoria Pike, Teddy Randazzo	4:36
7	"You're the Song (That I Can't Stop Singing)"	Ken Gold, Tony Rivers	2:47
8	"Look at the World It's Changing"	Tony Colton, Albert Lee	5:37
9	"Where Were You (When I Needed You)	Teddy Randazzo, Victoria Pike, Roger Joyce	2:53
10	"What Good Am I Without You"	Teddy Randazzo, Victoria Pike	3:26

== Four Seasons ==
- Frankie Valli - vocals
- Bob Gaudio - producer, keyboards, piano
- Don Ciccone - bass guitar
- Gerry Polci - drums
- Lee Shapiro - keyboards, string and horn arrangement
- John Paiva - lead guitar
