= We're All Alone =

1976 single by Boz Scaggs

"We're All Alone" is a song written by Boz Scaggs, which became a hit for Frankie Valli in 1976. The next year it was a top-ten hit for Rita Coolidge in the US and the UK. Scaggs introduced it on his 1976 album Silk Degrees, and included it as the B-side of two of the four single releases from that LP, including "Lido Shuffle".

== Boz Scaggs version ==
"We're All Alone"
- Australian single

Single by Boz Scaggs

from the album Silk Degrees
- A-side: "What Can I Say", "Lido Shuffle"
- Released: November 1976
- Genre: Soft rock
- Length: 4:12
- Label: Columbia
- Songwriter: Boz Scaggs
- Producer: Joe Wissert

Scaggs' own version of "We're All Alone" was the standard B-side of his international single release "Lido Shuffle" including its release in the US and UK where "Lido Shuffle" respectively charted at number 11 and number 13. However, in Australia, Scaggs' "We're All Alone" was issued with "Lowdown" as the flip to become a double A-side chart entry reaching number 54 in the autumn of 1977, the only evident instance of the Scaggs original charting.

Chart (1977)	Peak position
Australia (Kent Music Report)	54

Personnel

- Boz Scaggs – vocals, guitar
- David Paich – acoustic piano, arrangements
- Fred Tackett – guitar
- Louis Shelton – guitar, acoustic guitar
- David Hungate – bass
- Jeff Porcaro – drums
- Sid Sharp – string conductor and concertmaster
- Tony Terran, Vincent DeRosa, Jim Horn, Paul Hubinon, Dick Hyde, Plas Johnson, Tom Scott and Bud Shank – horns

== Frankie Valli version ==
"We're All Alone"
- One of side-A labels of the US single

Single by Frankie Valli

from the album Valli
- B-side: "You to Me Are Everything"
- Released: August 1976
- Length: 3:59
- Label: Private Stock
- Songwriter: Boz Scaggs
- Producer: Bob Gaudio

Frankie Valli singles chronology
"Boomerang" (1975)	"We're All Alone" (1976)	"Our Day Will Come" (1975)

Frankie Valli had a single version from his Valli LP which reached number 78 U.S. in August 1976 (number 74 Cash Box, number 27 Adult Contemporary; Canada number 73 Pop, number 36 AC).

Record World said that "Valli's interpretation is warm and sincere."

Chart (1976)	Peak position
Canada Adult Contemporary (RPM)	36
Canada Top Singles (RPM)	73
US Billboard Hot 100	78
US Adult Contemporary (Billboard)	27
US Cash Box Top 100	74

== Rita Coolidge version ==
"We're All Alone"
- US vinyl picture sleeve

Single by Rita Coolidge

from the album Anytime...Anywhere
- B-side: "Southern Lady"
- Released: June 1977
- Genre: Folk rock
- Length: 3:38
- Label: A&M
- Songwriter: Boz Scaggs
- Producer: David Anderle

Rita Coolidge singles chronology
"(Your Love Has Lifted Me) Higher and Higher" (1977)	"We're All Alone" (1977)	"The Way You Do the Things You Do" (1977)

The Rita Coolidge version of "We're All Alone" was featured on the album Anytime...Anywhere released in March 1977. Her version had the greatest sales success.

Coolidge was already familiar with Scaggs; she sang backing vocals, and she arranged and directed the other backing singers on his albums Moments and Boz Scaggs & Band, both from 1971, on Columbia Records.

Coolidge recalled: "When I was with A&M Records, it was like a family. I would visit Herb Alpert and Jerry Moss, and it was a very open, communicative group of people. One day I was in Jerry Moss' office and he said that the Boz Scaggs album Silk Degrees was in a million homes and there was a song on it that was perfect for a woman to sing. He said, 'It's called "We're All Alone" and as he's not doing it as a single, I think you ought to record it.'"

The original lyrics of "We're All Alone" include lines "Close your eyes ami" and "Throw it to the wind my love". Coolidge sings these lines as "Close your eyes and dream" and "Owe it to the wind my love".

Although the first single off the US release of Anytime...Anywhere was "(Your Love Has Lifted Me) Higher and Higher", "We're All Alone" was the first single taken off the album in the UK where it reached number 6 in August 1977 when "(Your Love Has Lifted Me) Higher and Higher" was moving up the US top 10; that same month "We're All Alone" reached number 6 in Ireland. In September, Coolidge's version of "We're All Alone" entered the Dutch charts where it would peak at number 15 (in August the Walker Brothers' version had reached number 22 on the Dutch charts).

The second single from Anytime...Anywhere in the US, "We're All Alone" there ascended to number 7 that September: the track also received enough airplay in the C&W market to reach number 68 on the C&W chart.

"We're All Alone" was the first of Coolidge's two Adult Contemporary number 1 hits – the second would be "All Time High" – and after "(Your Love Has Lifted Me) Higher and Higher" was her second single to be certified gold for US sales of 1,000,000.

In December 1977, "We're All Alone" entered the charts in Australia to remain for 16 weeks with a number 32 peak – the original Boz Scaggs version had been a minor Australian hit in the autumn of 1977 reaching number 54 in a tandem charting with its flip "Lowdown".

In New Zealand, Coolidge's "We're All Alone" charted with a number 34 peak in February 1978.

Coolidge remade "We're All Alone" for her 2005 jazz release And So Is Love: Elysa Gardner of USA Today opined that Coolidge "brings a new wistfulness and knowing to her own hit of yore...proving that good interpretive singers, like fine wine, improve with age."

=== Charts ===
==== Weekly charts ====
Chart (1977–1978)	Peak position
Argentina (CAPIF)	2
Australia (Kent Music Report)	32
Canada Adult Contemporary (RPM)	1
Canada Top Singles (RPM)	5
Ireland (IRMA)	6
Netherlands (Single Top 100)	15
Netherlands (Dutch Top 40)	17
New Zealand (RIANZ)	34
UK Singles (Official Charts)	6
US Billboard Hot 100	7
US Adult Contemporary (Billboard)	1
US Cash Box Top 100	5
US Record World	4

==== Year-end charts ====
Chart (1977)	Rank
Canada Top Singles (RPM)	62

Chart (1978)	Rank
Canada Top Singles (RPM)	159
US Billboard Hot 100	98

== Other notable versions ==
The Walker Brothers – one of Scaggs' formative influences – cut "We're All Alone" for their Lines album; the track had an October 1976 single release in the UK where the Frankie Valli version had a single release that July; the Walker Brothers' version reached number 22 in the Netherlands in August 1977 a month before the Rita Coolidge version reached the Dutch charts.

In March 1977, the version by the Three Degrees – recorded for the album Standing Up for Love – was a UK single release meaning that the Rita Coolidge version of "We're All Alone" which reached UK number 6 that summer was the fourth UK single release to feature the song as an A-side. That same month, country singer LaCosta had a single release of "We're All Alone" in the US (number 75 C&W) and the UK where the track was the B-side of a remake of "I Second That Emotion". Also in 1977, jazz pianist Bob James released an instrumental version on his album Heads.

Masayoshi Takanaka, a notable Japanese jazz fusion musician, recorded an instrumental version of "We're All Alone" on the 1978 album On Guitar.

Gilberto Santa Rosa interpreted the same melody of the song in a free version titled "Impaciencia" on his album Punto de Vista in 1990.

== See also ==
- List of number-one adult contemporary singles of 1977 (U.S.)
