= You're So Fine (The Falcons song) =

Single by The Falcons
- B-side: "Goddess of Angels"
- Released: 1959
- Recorded: 1959
- Genre: Rhythm and blues
- Length: 2:30
- Label: Unart
- Songwriter(s): Lance Finney, Willie Schofield, Bob West

The Falcons singles chronology
"You're So Fine" (1959)	"You're Mine" (1959)

"You're So Fine" is the title of a popular song performed by The Falcons.

== Background ==
The song was released as a single in 1959 and reached number seventeen on the US Billboard chart.

== Chart history ==
Chart (1959)	Peak position
U.S. Billboard Hot 100	17
U.S. Billboard Hot R&B Sides	2

== Covers ==
- Johnny Burnette's 1961 album Johnny Burnett featured the song.
- The song was recorded by Boz Scaggs for his 1965 album Boz.
- Wilson Pickett, who joined The Falcons a year after they recorded the song, used it as the B-side to his single version of "Land of a 1000 Dances", recorded in May 1966. His version was backed by the Muscle Shoals Rhythm Section.
- Ike and Tina Turner included the song on the 1966 album River Deep - Mountain High, although the song was likely recorded prior to that year.
- A live version of the song was included as a bonus track on a rerelease of Grinderswitch's 1974 album Honest To Goodness.
- Tony Orlando used the song on his 1978 album Tony Orlando.
- Rita Coolidge covered the song on her 1978 album Love Me Again.
