= My Time: A Boz Scaggs Anthology =

My Time: A Boz Scaggs Anthology (1969-1997)

Greatest hits album by Boz Scaggs
- Released: October 7, 1997
- Length: 148:04
- Label: Columbia, Legacy

Boz Scaggs chronology
Come On Home (1997)	My Time: A Boz Scaggs Anthology (1969-1997) (1997)	Dig (2001)

Professional ratings
Review scores
Source	Rating
AllMusic	4/5 stars

My Time: A Boz Scaggs Anthology (1969–1997) is an anthology album by Boz Scaggs.

== Track listing ==
=== Disc one ===
1. "Runnin' Blue" – 3:58
2. "We Were Always Sweethearts" – 3:29
3. "Near You" – 4:59
4. "Painted Bells" – 4:02
5. "Dinah Flo" – 3:04
6. "Might Have to Cry" – 4:06
7. "You Make It So Hard (To Say No)" – 3:34
8. "I Got Your Number" – 3:48
9. "Slow Dancer" – 3:14
10. "Hercules" – 4:04
11. "What Can I Say" – 3:00
12. "It's Over" – 2:50
13. "Harbor Lights" – 5:57
14. "Lowdown" – 5:16
15. "Lido Shuffle" – 3:43
16. "We're All Alone" – 4:12
17. "Loan Me a Dime" – 13:04

=== Disc two ===
1. "Hard Times" – 4:30
2. "1993" – 4:05
3. "Jojo" – 5:52
4. "Isn't It Time" – 4:54
5. "Simone" – 5:08
6. "Breakdown Dead Ahead" – 4:35
7. "Miss Sun" – 5:32
8. "Look What You've Done to Me" – 5:18
9. "Heart of Mine" – 4:14
10. "What's Number One?" – 3:59
11. "Drowning in the Sea of Love" – 5:02
12. "Sierra" – 5:21
13. "Some Change" – 6:11
14. "As The Years Go Passing By – 4:44
15. "Just Go" – 3:01
16. "Goodnight Louise" – 4:02
