= Boz (album) =

Studio album by Boz Scaggs
- Released: October 1965
- Recorded: September 30, 1965
- Studio: Europafilm, Stockholm
- Genre: Folk, blues
- Length: 30:35
- Label: Polydor
- Producer: Silas Bäckström

Boz Scaggs chronology
Boz (1965)	Boz Scaggs (1969)

Boz is the debut album by Boz Scaggs, recorded under the name "William R. Scaggs" at Europafilm Studios in Stockholm, Sweden, on September 30, 1965. It was released in Sweden by Polydor Records in October 1965.

== Track listing ==
The back of the album jacket lists two songs in the incorrect sequence. This track sequence lists the song titles as printed on the labels on the album itself. The album labels contain many songwriter credit errors. The songwriters listed below are correct.

=== Side one ===
1. "Steamboat" – 2:10 (Buddy Lucas) [Incorrectly listed on the album label as 'Leiber/Stoller']
2. "Baby Let Me Follow You Down" – 2:19 (Gary Davis, Dave van Ronk, Eric von Schmidt) [Incorrectly listed on the album label as 'van Schmidt']
3. "Girl from the North Country" – 3:33 (Bob Dylan)
4. "You're So Fine" – 2:07 (Lance Finnie, Willie Schofield) [Incorrectly listed on the album label as 'le Vang']
5. "Got You on My Mind" – 2:57 (Joe Thomas, Howard Biggs) [Incorrectly listed on the album label as 'Thomas/Briggs']
6. "That's All Right" – 2:07 (Arthur Crudup) [Incorrectly listed on the album label as 'Allan Lumats']

=== Side two ===
1. "Hey Baby" – 2:30 (Bruce Channel, Margaret Cobb) [Incorrectly listed on the album label as 'Bruce Chanel']
2. "Gangster of Love" – 2:19 (Johnny "Guitar" Watson)
3. "Let the Good Times Roll" – 2:17 (Sam Theard, Fleecie Moore Jordan) [Incorrectly listed on the album label as 'Ray Charles/L. Jordan']
4. "How Long" – 2:16 (Traditional; arranged by William R. Scaggs)
5. "Stormy Monday Blues" – 3:38 (Aaron Thibadeaux "T-Bone" Walker)
6. "C.C. Rider" – 2:22 (Traditional; arranged by William R. Scaggs)

== Personnel ==
- Boz Scaggs - vocals, acoustic guitar, harmonica

Technical

- Lennart Saletti - artwork
- Peter Knopp - photography
