= Jai Winding =

- Born: August 20, 1950 (age 76); New York City
- Occupations: Keyboardist, music producer, songwriter, session musician arranger

Jai Winding is an American keyboardist, session musician, arranger, songwriter, music publisher, music producer and residential realtor. He is the son of Danish-born jazz trombonist Kai Winding. Winding is recognized for his work with various pop and rock artists and for serving as a musical director on several world tours.

== Early life and education ==
Jai Winding was born in New York City and raised in Dobbs Ferry, New York. He attended Hackley School in Tarrytown, New York, and studied sociology at Susquehanna University. Winding also received piano instruction from Sanford Gold in Manhattan, New York.

== Career ==
In early 1970s, Winding relocated to Los Angeles and performed with Al Jarreau at a club in the San Fernando Valley prior to the release of Jarreau's debut album, We Got By, on Warner Bros. Records. In early 1974, he joined Jackson Browne's band, playing piano and Hammond organ during rehearsals of Late For The Sky produced by Browne and Al Schmitt. Following the album's release, Winding toured with Jackson Browne and his band, which included David Lindley. Bonnie Raitt served as the supporting act on the tour, and Winding also played keyboards for her during the performances. He continued to work with Raitt on tour and contributed keyboard parts to her 1975 album Home Plate, released on Warner Bros. Records.

Following a recommendation from David Paich, Winding toured with Seals and Crofts. He later joined Dave Mason, replacing Mike Finnegan as a band member to record the album Split Coconut on Columbia Records. In 1976, release of Silk Degrees, Boz Scaggs hired Winding to play keyboards on the subsequent tour. In 1977, Winding collaborated with Scaggs as a songwriter on the album Down Two Then Left, co-writing and playing piano on the track "What You Gonna Tell Your Man."

Winding returned to Los Angeles to focus on studio work, including arranging and producing. Record producer Tom Werman hired him as a keyboardist for the album In Color and Heaven Tonight by Cheap Trick, and as both keyboardist and string arranger for their album Dream Police. Becky Shargo, an Epic Records A&R staffer and later Winding's wife, was the music supervisor for the multi-platinum Urban Cowboy soundtrack on Full Moon. Asylum Records engaged Winding to produce two tracks for artist Bonnie Raitt "Don't It Make You Wanna Dance" and "Darlin."

=== 1980s and 1990s ===
In 1984, Winding joined the touring band for the Jackson Victory Tour, where he worked alongside keyboardist and record producer Patrick Leonard. Winding became a member of Madonna's touring band for the 1987 Who's That Girl Tour, with Leonard serving as musical director. He subsequently served as musical director for Madonna's 1990 Blond Ambition Tour and her 1993 The Girlie Show Tour. Winding is featured in the documentary film Truth or Dare, which documents Madonna's Blond Ambition Tour.

191885, Winding joined Don Henley's Band for the Building the Perfect Beast Tour. Following the tour, Henley began working on his 1989 album The End of the Innocence, on which Winding played Moog bass on the title track, featuring a soprano saxophone solo by Wayne Shorter. Winding also co-wrote the song "New York Minute" with Henley and producer Danny Kortchmar. Winding co-wrote four songs on Henley's subsequent album Inside Job alongside Henley and co-producer Stan Lynch.
