= Boz Scaggs (album) =

Studio album by Boz Scaggs
- Released: August 19, 1969
- Studio: Muscle Shoals Sound Studio, Sheffield, Alabama
- Genre: Americana; blue-eyed soul
- Length: 44:13
- Label: Atlantic
- Producer: Jann Wenner, Marlin Greene, Boz Scaggs

Boz Scaggs chronology
Boz (1965)	Boz Scaggs (1969)	Moments (1971)

Boz Scaggs is the second studio album by American musician Boz Scaggs, released in 1969 by Atlantic Records. (Note: Boz Scaggs was marketed as Scaggs' debut album, although he recorded an album in 1966 titled Boz, which was only released in Sweden.) A stylistically diverse album, Boz Scaggs incorporates several genres, including Americana, blue-eyed soul, country, and rhythm and blues. The lyrics are about typical themes found in blues songs, such as love, regret, guilt, and loss. Scaggs recorded the album at Muscle Shoals Sound Studio with producer Jann Wenner, the co-founder of Rolling Stone magazine. The Muscle Shoals Rhythm Section heavily contributed to the album, which included a young Duane Allman, before his rise to fame with the Allman Brothers Band.

Boz Scaggs was mostly ignored by listeners and critics upon release, and only sold around 20,000 copies within its first few years. The critics that did review the album enjoyed it, and commended the musicianship between Scaggs and the Muscle Shoals Rhythm Section. Boz Scaggs continues to receive praise in retrospective reviews, with some critics calling it an underrated album from the 1960s. In 2012, Boz Scaggs was ranked at number 496 on Rolling Stone's list of the 500 Greatest Albums of All Time.

== Background and recording ==
In 1967, Boz Scaggs joined the Steve Miller Band, a San Francisco-based rock group. He played guitar on the band's first two albums—Children of the Future and Sailor (both 1968)—before leaving the same year to pursue a solo career. At the time, Scaggs lived in Potrero Hill, and was next-door neighbors with Jann Wenner, the co-founder of Rolling Stone magazine. The two became good friends; Wenner provided feedback on material Scaggs had written, and encouraged him to make some demo tapes.

Wenner was looking for more funding for the magazine, and talked with music executives along the East Coast of the United States. In one of the meetings, he talked with Jerry Wexler of Atlantic Records, and gave Wexler a demo tape Scaggs had made. Wexler was impressed by the music, and asked Wenner to produce an album with Scaggs under the Atlantic label. After some initial discussions with Scaggs, Wenner suggested he record the album at Muscle Shoals Sound Studio in Sheffield, Alabama, based on the style of music he had been making. Scaggs wanted to watch some of the recording sessions at Muscle Shoals anonymously, so Wenner gave him a Rolling Stone press badge to visit the studio and interact with the studio musicians. During this visit, Scaggs met several musicians that would appear on Boz Scaggs, including Duane Allman, Roger Hawkins, and David Hood.

Scaggs and Wenner wanted Allman to be one of the prominent guitarists on the album, but after calling Muscle Shoals they found out Allman had moved to Macon, Georgia, and was in the process of forming what would become the Allman Brothers Band. Wenner was able to convince Allman to come back for one week after mentioning Atlantic Records involvement. Scaggs said that having Allman come back was a catalyst for the album, as the musicians in the Muscle Shoals Rhythm Section had great respect for him. In addition to Allman, Boz Scaggs featured many backing musicians, including: Hawkins, Hood, Barry Beckett, Eddie Hinton, and Jimmy Johnson. When asked about the recording sessions with Wenner, Scaggs said: "He was as good of a producer as anyone could want, he was very encouraging."

== Composition ==
=== Music and lyrics ===
"Loan Me a Dime"
A thirty second sample of "Loan Me a Dime." In this sample, Scaggs stops singing, and Allman begins a brief guitar solo.

Boz Scaggs is an amalgamation of several genres, including Americana, blue-eyed soul, country, and rhythm and blues; tracks on the album often switch between these genres. Wenner wanted Boz Scaggs to serve as a musical showcase for both Scaggs and the Muscle Shoals Rhythm Section. "I knew the Muscle Shoals guys had never been used to stretch out ... I thought we should make a rock & roll record that showcased them as much as Boz." According to Wenner, Boz Scaggs was inspired by the music of Clarence Carter and the Bob Dylan album Nashville Skyline. Lyrically, Scaggs sings about typical themes found in blues songs, such as love, regret, guilt, and loss.

=== Songs ===
Side one of the album opens with two blue-eyed soul songs titled "I'm Easy" and "I'll Be Long Gone". Variety likened "I'm Easy" to the sound of Aretha Franklin, and "I'll Be Long Gone" to Dionne Warwick. Ed Leimbacher of Rolling Stone expanded upon the Warwick connection, describing the track's gentle interplay on the organ as having a heavy influence of gospel music. "Another Day (Another Letter)" is a rock ballad with '50s progression, while "Now You're Gone" is a honky-tonk country track with a slide guitar and fiddle. The contemporary country track "Finding Her" features a bridge section with more slide guitar and a piano instrumental, which Leimbacher compared to Moonlight Sonata. Side one ends with the folk inspired track "Look What I've Got".

Side two opens with a cover of the Jimmie Rodgers song "Waiting for a Train", in which an accentuated piano is accompanied by Scagg's yodels. The penultimate track is "Loan Me a Dime", a cover of the Fenton Robinson song "Somebody Loan Me a Dime". The 1969 release lists Scaggs as the songwriter, but later reissues credit the song to Robinson. It is a twelve and a half minutes and is widely considered by critics to be the centerpiece of the album. About halfway through the track, Scaggs stops singing, and Allman begins an extended guitar solo. The original version of "Loan Me a Dime" was a forty-minute jam session, which was shorted to the twelve minute version on Boz Scaggs. The lyrics on the final track, "Sweet Release" contrast the pessimistic themes found on the rest of the album. Scaggs sings about the necessity in the redemptive power of music.

== Reception ==
Professional ratings
Review scores
Source	Rating
AllMusic	4.5/5 stars
The Rolling Stone Album Guide	4.5/5 stars
The Village Voice	B+

Boz Scaggs was released on August 19, 1969, as Scagg's debut album with Atlantic Records. It was mostly ignored by listeners and critics, and only sold around 20,000 copies within its first few years of release. The critics that did review the album enjoyed it, and commended the musicianship between Scaggs and the Muscle Shoals Rhythm Section. Billboard highlighted the tracks "I'll Be Long Gone", "Finding Her", and "Waiting for a Train", and wrote how the album would boost Scaggs into the public eye. Robert Christgau of The Village Voice praised Allman's role, and called Boz Scaggs "a nice tribute to American music". Rolling Stone critic Ed Leimbacher credited Scaggs for exploring rock, gospel, soul, and the blues "effortlessly" and with "panache".

Critics continue to praise Boz Scaggs in retrospective reviews. Stephen Thomas Erlewine of AllMusic described the album as an early showcase for Scaggs' musical skills, and ultimately wrote: "[Boz Scaggs] is an enduring blue-eyed soul masterpiece". The Rolling Stone Album Guide gave the album four and a half out of five stars, and described "Loan Me a Dime" as a highlight in the careers of both Scaggs and Allman. In 2012, Rolling Stone ranked Boz Scaggs at number 496 on its list of the 500 Greatest Albums of All Time. The magazine called it an "underrated gem", a sentiment which was shared by the magazine No Depression.

Since its initial release, Boz Scaggs has been reissued several times. A 1976 reissue peaked at number 176 on the Billboard 200 in the United States. In October 1977, the album was remixed by Tom Perry at Sound City in Los Angeles. A 1990 reissue featured this different audio mix, and was at the time the only CD version of the album. The original mix was re-issued in 2013, on the Super Audio CD format by Audio Fidelity. This version came with a 24-karat gold disc. In 2015 a 2CD edition on Edsel & Rhino combined both the 1969 original version and the 1977 remixed version.

== Track listing ==
All tracks composed by Boz Scaggs, except where noted.

Side one
No.	Title	Writer(s)	Length
1.	"I'm Easy"	Boz Scaggs, Barry Beckett	3:05
2.	"I'll Be Long Gone"		4:13
3.	"Another Day (Another Letter)"		2:53
4.	"Now You're Gone"		3:47
5.	"Finding Her"		3:56
6.	"Look What I Got"	Charles Chalmers, Donna Rhodes	4:10

Side two
No.	Title	Writer(s)	Length
1.	"Waiting for a Train"	Jimmie Rodgers	2:40
2.	"Loan Me a Dime"	Fenton Robinson	12:30
3.	"Sweet Release"	Scaggs, Beckett	6:13

== Personnel ==
Credits adapted from the liner notes of Boz Scaggs.

Musicians

- Boz Scaggs – guitar, vocals
- Duane "Skydog" Allman – guitar, dobro, slide guitar on side one tracks 5 and 6 and side two tracks 1 and 2
- Eddie Hinton, Jimmy Johnson – guitar
- David Hood – bass guitar
- Roger Hawkins – drums
- Barry Beckett – keyboards
- Al Lester – fiddle, violin
- Joe Arnold – tenor saxophone
- Charles Chalmers – tenor saxophone (1)
- James Mitchell – baritone saxophone
- Floyd Newman – baritone saxophone (1)
- Ben Cauley – trumpet (1)
- Gene "Bowlegs" Miller – trombone, trumpet
- Jeanie Greene – backing vocals
- Mary Holliday – backing vocals
- Donna Thatcher – backing vocals
- Joyce Dunn – backing vocals (2, 4)
- Tracy Nelson – backing vocals (2, 4)
- Irma Routen – backing vocals (2, 4)

Production

- Producers – Boz Scaggs, Marlin Greene and Jann Wenner.
- Engineer – Marlin Greene
- Mastered by Rob Grenell at Atlantic Studios
- Design – Robert Kingsbury
- Photography – Elaine Mayes
- Inner Liner Photos – Stephen Paley
