= Dig (Boz Scaggs album) =

Studio album by Boz Scaggs
- Released: 2001
- Studio: ATS (Molin, Austria): Acme (Mamaroneck, New York); Meac (San Francisco, California)
- Length: 51:00
- Label: Virgin
- Producer: David Paich; Danny Kortchmar

Boz Scaggs chronology
My Time: A Boz Scaggs Anthology (1997)	Dig (2001)	But Beautiful (2003)

Dig is an album by the American musician Boz Scaggs, released in 2001. It peaked at No. 146 on the Billboard 200. Scaggs promoted the album with a North American tour and an appearance on the television show Ally McBeal. A limited edition of the album included a disc containing a 5.1 channel DVD-Audio and Dolby Digital surround sound mix.

== Production ==
Scaggs began working on the album in early 2000 by recording and mailing music to David Paich. Dig was produced by Scaggs, Paich, and Danny Kortchmar. Scaggs employed sound effects and samples on some of its songs. Scaggs was backed by several members of the band Toto. Roy Hargrove played trumpet on some of the tracks. "Vanishing Point" is about two vagrants making their way to Las Vegas. Scaggs raps on "Get on the Natch".

== Critical reception ==
Professional ratings
Review scores
Source	Rating
AllMusic	4/5 stars
Orlando Sentinel	3/5 stars
(The New) Rolling Stone Album Guide	3.5/5 stars

The Guardian wrote that "Dig sounds convincingly 21st century, but at heart it's the latest chapter in Scaggs's long-standing enthusiasm for rhythm and blues." The Independent determined that "Scaggs is the American equivalent of Robert Palmer, an elegant R&B stylist with consummate blues and soul chops, whose career has been occasionally wrong-footed by the vagaries of musical fashion, despite the abiding excellence of his recordings." The Mail on Sunday deemed the album "slow, understated and soulful; a record for Sunday nights and long, solitary drives."

The Observer concluded that "Scaggs is still the blue-eyed soul voice against which others should be measured." The Morning Call opined that "Scaggs's lame, late-'60s urban hipster attitude is the final shovel on Dig's grave, but it provides unintended laughs on tracks such as the lifestyle lesson 'Get on the Natch'." The Orlando Sentinel noted that, "although his voice remains as warm and intoxicating as a shot of whiskey, Scaggs rarely lifts these songs above the level of pleasant, generic diversions."

== Track listing ==
All lyrics composed by Boz Scaggs; except where indicated

1. "Payday" (music: David Paich, Boz Scaggs) – 4:43
2. "Sarah" (music: Danny Kortchmar, Alan Jay Lerner, Frederick Loewe) – 4:45
3. "Miss Riddle" (music: Paich, Michael Rodriguez, Scaggs) – 6:27
4. "I Just Go" (Scaggs) – 4:50
5. "Get on the Natch" (music: Angelo Bond, General Johnson, Kortchmar, Greg Perry) – 4:50
6. "Desire" (music: Paich, Greg Phillinganes, Scaggs) – 5:32
7. "Call That Love" (music: Steve Jordan, Kortchmar, Paich, Scaggs; lyrics: Scaggs, Jack "Applejack" Walroth) – 4:18
8. "King of El Paso" (Scaggs, Walroth) – 5:16
9. "You're Not" (music: Kortchmar) – 4:19
10. "Vanishing Point" (lyrics: Scaggs, Dominique Gioia; music: Paich, Scaggs) – 4:48
11. "Thanks to You" (music: Paich, Scaggs) – 6:00

== Personnel ==
- Boz Scaggs – vocals, guitars (1, 4, 6, 8, 10, 11), arrangements
- John Jessel – keyboard programming
- David Paich – keyboards (1, 2, 4–11), synthesizers (1–3, 5, 6, 9, 10, 11), backing vocals (9), arrangements
- Michael Rodriguez – synthesizer programming (1, 3, 6), keyboards (3)
- Greg Phillinganes – acoustic piano (3)
- Danny Kortchmar – guitars (1–3, 5–11), synthesizer programming (2, 5, 9), arrangements
- Ray Parker Jr. – guitars (1)
- Steve Lukather – guitar solo (5), pedal steel guitar (11)
- Nathan East – bass guitar (4)
- Steve Jordan – bass guitar (7), drums (7)
- Robin DiMaggio – drums (1), percussion (4, 11)
- Joe Bonadio – percussion (2, 6)
- Roy Hargrove Jr. – horns (1, 3, 7, 11)
- Martin Tillman – cello (10)
- Monet – backing vocals (2, 6–9)

Production

- Danny Kortchmar – producer, pre-production recording
- David Paich – producer
- Peter Dennenberg – engineer
- Steve MacMillan – engineer, post-production recording, Pro Tools management
- Jess Sutcliffe – engineer
- Bob Levy – additional recording
- Michael Rodriguez – additional tracking, pre-production recording
- Pablo Munguia – Pro Tools engineer
- Elliot Scheiner – mixing at Presence Studios (Weston, Connecticut)
- Joe Peccerillo – mix assistant
- Adam Ayan – digital editing
- Bob Ludwig – mastering at Gateway Mastering (Portland, Maine)
- Mary Hogan – production coordinator
- Mary Fagot – art direction
- Carol Bobolts – design
- Ken Schels – photography
