= Miss Sun =

Single by Boz Scaggs

from the album Hits!
- B-side: "Simone"
- Released: November 1, 1980
- Recorded: 1980
- Genre: Smooth soul
- Length: 5:33 (album version); 4:10 (single edit)
- Label: Columbia
- Songwriter: David Paich
- Producer: Bill Schnee

Boz Scaggs singles chronology
"Look What You've Done to Me" (1980)	"Miss Sun" (1980)	"Heart of Mine" (1988)

"Miss Sun" is a 1980 hit for Boz Scaggs first recorded in 1977 by David Paich along with David Hungate, Steve Lukather, Jeff Porcaro and Steve Porcaro.

== Background ==
The five musicians worked as session musicians on Scaggs' Down Two Then Left album. They also worked on the self-titled album by Lisa Dalbello which was produced by David Foster. Dalbello was invited to vocalize on the "Miss Sun" track, one of several demos that Lukather, Hungate, Paich, and Porcaro cut at Davlen Studios. These demos led to the four musicians being signed to Columbia — Scaggs's label — as the nucleus of the group Toto. "Miss Sun" was never featured on an original Toto album — the demo track was released on Toto XX in 1998 — but in 1980 Scaggs cut the song with Bill Schnee producing and with Hungate, Lukather, Paich, and Porcaro providing backing. Dalbello chanced to be in Los Angeles and was invited to replicate her vocal contribution to the original demo. The Boz Scaggs version of "Miss Sun" (on which the single releases alone credit the songwriting to both Paich and Scaggs) was the only previously unreleased track on Scaggs's 1980 compilation album Hits! which would punctuate his career as a regular album artist, his subsequent releases being spaced several years apart.

As a single, "Miss Sun" peaked at #14 in February 1981 and at #13 Adult Contemporary. Billboard ranked it No. 99 in its year-end survey for 1981.

The Average White Band had cut the song a few months earlier for their 1980 album Shine (produced by David Foster) but it was left off the initial release and not added until years later as a bonus track.

== Personnel ==
- Boz Scaggs - lead vocals
- David Paich - keyboards, backing vocals, Moog bass
- Steve Lukather - guitar
- Jeff Porcaro - drums, percussion
- Steve Porcaro - synthesizers
- Lisa Dalbello - vocals
- David Hungate - bass

== Chart history ==
=== Weekly charts ===
Chart (1980–1981)	Peak position
Canada RPM Top Singles	33
US Billboard Hot 100	14
US Billboard Adult Contemporary	13
Cash Box Top 100	18

=== Year-end charts ===
Chart (1981)	Rank
US Top Pop Singles (Billboard)	99
