= Moments (Boz Scaggs album) =

Studio album by Boz Scaggs
- Released: March 1971
- Studios: Wally Heider Studios, San Francisco, California
- Genres: Rock, blue-eyed soul
- Length: 42:25
- Label: Columbia
- Producer: Glyn Johns

Boz Scaggs chronology
Boz Scaggs (1969)	Moments (1971)	Boz Scaggs & Band (1971)

Moments is the third studio album by American singer-songwriter Boz Scaggs, released in March 1971. It was his first album following his signing with Columbia Records. The album combines elements of soul and contemporary R&B with a musical foundation in blues and rock music. Featuring Scaggs's distinctive raspy voice, blues-influenced vocals, and varied instrumental arrangements, the album offers an early indication of the musical direction he would pursue in his subsequent career.

== Background ==
The album was recorded at Wally Heider Studios in San Francisco, California, while mixing took place at Island Studios in London, England.

Musically, the album combines elements of blue-eyed soul and soft rock with a foundation in rock and contemporary R&B. Whereas his previous album, Boz Scaggs (1969), emphasized a rawer blend of soul rock and blues, Moments features a softer and more laid-back sound. AllMusic critic Stephen Thomas Erlewine noted the album's distinctly Californian warmth and smooth musical arrangements, describing it as an indication of the blue-eyed soul direction Scaggs would further develop on Silk Degrees (1976).

The album's musicians included Scaggs on vocals and guitar, guitarists Curly Cook and Doug Simril, bassist David Brown, and drummer George Rains. Ben Sidran played keyboards and vibraphone, while John McFee contributed steel guitar. The Rita Coolidge Ladies Ensemble provided backing vocals.

== Reception ==
Professional ratings
Review scores
Source	Rating
AllMusic	4/5 stars
Christgau's Record Guide	B

In a contemporary review, Rolling Stone critic Charlie Burton hailed Moments as "one of the most transcendental albums to come out of rock in some time", "elaborately arranged and produced, but the result is a warm, funky spontaneity, somewhat reminiscent of Van Morrison, but, I think, more accessible." Allmusic gave a thoroughly warm retrospective review of the album, praising its mellow and laid-back tone. They also considered the album a precursor to Scaggs's greatest artistic achievement, saying that it "found him sketching out the blue-eyed soul that would eventually bring him fame when he streamlined it for 1976's Silk Degrees."

== Track listing ==
All tracks composed by Boz Scaggs except where indicated

Side One

1. "We Were Always Sweethearts" - 3:31
2. "Downright Women" - 4:38
3. "Painted Bells" - 4:03
4. "Alone, Alone" (David Brown) - 3:41
5. "Near You" - 4:54

Side Two

1. "I Will Forever Sing (The Blues)" (Powell St. John) - 5:16
2. "Moments" - 4:35
3. "Hollywood Blues" - 2:42
4. "We Been Away" (David Brown) - 3:44
5. "Can I Make It Last (Or Will It Just Be Over)" - 5:20 - Instrumental

== Personnel ==
- Boz Scaggs - guitar, vocals
- James "Curley" Cooke - guitar
- John McFee - steel guitar
- Doug Simril - guitar, keyboards
- Joachim Young - keyboards
- Ben Sidran - keyboards, vibraphone
- David Brown - bass
- George Rains - drums
- Coke Escovedo, Pete Escovedo - percussion
- Bill Atwood - trumpet, flugelhorn
- Pat O'Hara - trombone, horn arrangements
- Mel Martin - saxophone, flute
- Brian Rogers - string arrangements
- The Rita Coolidge Ladies Ensemble - backing vocals

== Production ==
- Produced, recorded and mixed by Glyn Johns
- Recorded at Wally Heider Studios (San Francisco, CA)
- Mixed at Island Studios (London, England)
- Cover Design – Anne Blackford
- Photography – George H. Conger
