= Come On Home (album) =

Studio album by Boz Scaggs
- Released: April 8, 1997
- Genre: Rock, blues, R&B
- Length: 59:18
- Label: Virgin (USA)
- Producer: Boz Scaggs

Boz Scaggs chronology
Fade into Light (1996/2005)	Come On Home (1997)	My Time: A Boz Scaggs Anthology (1969-1997) (1997)

Come On Home is the thirteenth studio album by American musician Boz Scaggs released in 1997.

== Reception ==
Professional ratings
Review scores
Source	Rating
Allmusic	4/5 stars

In their retrospective review, Allmusic called Come On Home "a genuine musical treasure."

JazzTimes reviewer Bill Milkowski wrote, "One white, former rocker who doesn’t need to apologize for his singing is Boz Scaggs. On Come On Home Boz croons with grace, soul and all-knowing cool on a collection of gospel, r&b and blues-flavored numbers".

== Track listing ==
1. "It All Went Down the Drain" (Earl King) - 5:32
2. "Ask Me 'Bout Nothin' (But the Blues)" (Deadric Malone, Henry Boozier) - 4:39
3. "Don't Cry No More" (Deadric Malone) - 3:12
4. "Found Love" (Jimmy Reed) - 2:58
5. "Come On Home" (Earl Randle, Willie Mitchell) - 3:14
6. "Picture of a Broken Heart" (Scaggs, Dennis Walker) - 4:03
7. "Love Letters" (Edward Heyman, Victor Young) - 3:47
8. "I've Got Your Love" (Scaggs) - 4:34
9. "Early in the Morning" (Sonny Boy Williamson I) - 4:38
10. "Your Good Thing (Is About to End)" (David Porter, Isaac Hayes) - 7:21
11. "T-Bone Shuffle" (T-Bone Walker) - 2:43
12. "Sick and Tired" (Chris Kenner, Dave Bartholomew) - 4:31
13. "After Hours" (Scaggs) - 4:04
14. "Goodnight Louise" (Scaggs) - 4:02

== Personnel ==
- Boz Scaggs – lead and backing vocals, guitars (1, 3, 4, 6–8, 11–13), horn arrangements (1, 3, 6, 12)
- Charles Hodges – Hammond B3 organ (1, 3)
- Jim Cox – Hammond B3 organ (1, 5, 7), acoustic piano (5, 7, 8, 10, 14)
- Scott Plunkett – Hammond B3 organ (2, 7), acoustic piano (11)
- David Matthews – Hammond B3 organ (3, 7, 13), acoustic piano (12)
- Tom Coster – accordion (14)
- Fred Tackett – guitars (1, 2, 5–8, 10–12)
- Steve Freund – guitars (4, 9)
- Freddie Washington – bass guitar (1–3, 5, 7, 10, 12)
- James "Hutch" Hutchinson – bass guitar (4, 6, 9, 11)
- Daryl Johnson – bass guitar (8, 14)
- Jim Keltner – drums (1, 5, 7–10, 14)
- Ricky Fataar – drums (2–4, 11–13)
- Norbert Stachel – alto, baritone and tenor saxophones (1, 2, 6, 10–12, 14); horn arrangements (1, 2, 6, 10–12, 14)
- Vincent Lars – alto saxophone (1, 2, 6, 10–12, 14)
- Dave Ellis – tenor saxophone (1, 2, 6, 10–12, 14)
- Rev. Ron Stallings – tenor saxophone (1, 2, 6, 10–12, 14)
- Ronnie Cuber – baritone saxophone (2, 3, 10, 12), horn arrangements (2, 3, 10, 12)
- Lonnie McMillan – tenor saxophone (3)
- James Mitchell – baritone saxophone (3)
- Wayne Wallace – trombone (1, 2, 6, 10–12, 14)
- Marty Wehner – trombone (1, 2, 6, 10–12, 14)
- Jack Hale Sr. – trombone (3)
- Brenda Rutledge – trombone (3)
- Bill Ortiz – trumpet (1, 2, 6, 10–12, 14)
- Ben Cauley – trumpet (3)
- Harry Duncan – harmonica (4, 9)
- Anthony Blea – violin (5)
- Otis Cooper – backing vocals (8)
- Kitty Beethoven – backing vocals (8)
- Conesha Monet Owens – backing vocals (8)

== Production ==
- Producer – Boz Scaggs
- Executive Producer – Harry Duncan
- Recorded by Michael Rodriguez and Elliot Scheiner
- Assistant Engineers – Skip Curley and Bob Levy
- Recorded at Meac Studio, Skywalker Sound (Marin County, CA) and Royal Recording Studio (Memphis, TN).
- Mixed by Michael Rodriguez at Meac Studio
- Mastered by Bernie Grundman at Bernie Grundman Mastering (Hollywood, CA).
- Project Coordinators – Mark Scaggs (technical) and Mary Hogan (logistics).
- Art Direction and Design – Mick Haggerty
- Front Photography – Benedict J. Fernadez and Tom Keller
- Inlay Photography – Mick Haggerty
- Book Back Cover – Jean-Baptiste Mondino
- Management – Craig Fruin
