= Jeff Porcaro =

American drummer (1954–1992)

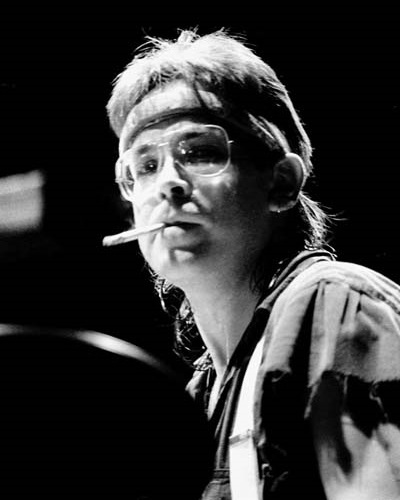
- Porcaro during the Toto Fahrenheit world tour at Blaisdell Arena in Honolulu in 1986

Background information
- Born: Jeffrey Thomas Porcaro; April 1, 1954; Hartford, Connecticut, U.S.
- Died: August 5, 1992 (aged 38) Los Angeles, California, U.S.
- Genres: Pop rock; jazz fusion; hard rock; progressive rock
- Occupations: Musician; songwriter
- Instruments: Drums; percussion
- Years active: 1971–1992
- Formerly of: Toto
- Spouse: Susan Norris (m. 1983)
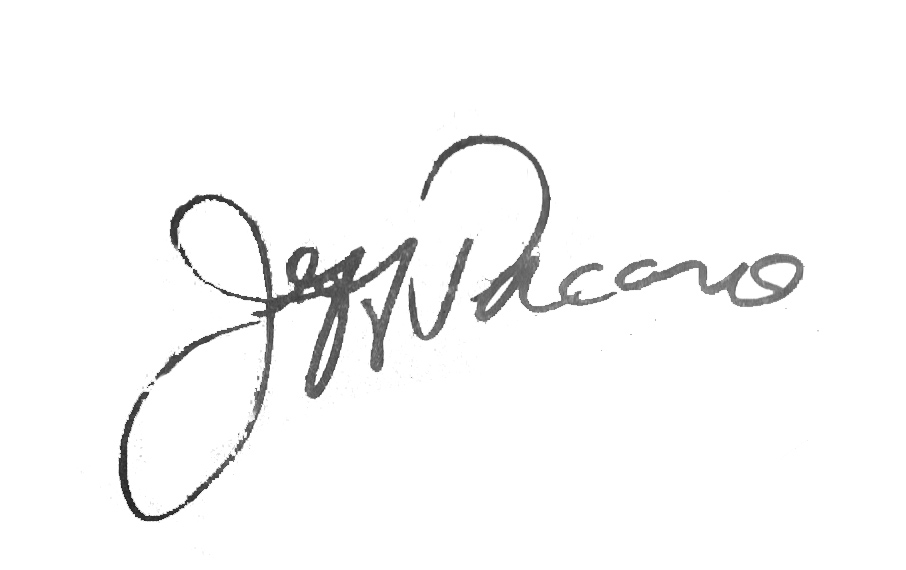

Jeffrey Thomas Porcaro (April 1, 1954 – August 5, 1992) was an American drummer and songwriter. He is best known for being the co-founder and drummer of the rock band Toto, but he is also one of the most recorded session musicians in history, working on hundreds of albums and thousands of sessions. While already an established studio player in the 1970s, he came to prominence in the US as the drummer on the Steely Dan album Katy Lied (1975).

AllMusic has characterized Porcaro as "arguably the most highly regarded studio drummer in rock from the mid-'70s to the early '90s", stating that "it is no exaggeration to say that the sound of mainstream pop/rock drumming in the 1980s was, to a large extent, the sound of Jeff Porcaro." He was posthumously inducted into the Modern Drummer Hall of Fame in 1993.

== Early life ==
Jeffrey Thomas Porcaro was born on April 1, 1954, in Hartford, Connecticut, the eldest son of Los Angeles session percussionist Joe Porcaro (1930–2020) and his wife, Eileen (née Linnell). His younger brother Mike was a successful bassist and was a member of the band Toto. Younger brother Steve, also a member of Toto, is still a studio musician. Porcaro was raised in the San Fernando Valley area of Los Angeles and attended Ulysses S. Grant High School. Jeff's youngest sibling, sister Joleen, was born in 1960.

== Career ==
Porcaro began playing drums at the age of seven. Lessons came from his father Joe Porcaro, followed by further studies with Bob Zimmitti and Richie Lepore. When he was seventeen, he got his first professional gig playing in Sonny & Cher's touring band. He later called Jim Keltner and Jim Gordon his idols at that time. During his twenties, Porcaro played on hundreds of albums, including three for Steely Dan. On the Steely Dan album Pretzel Logic, he played alongside Gordon on the dual-drummer track "Parker's Band". He toured with Boz Scaggs before co-founding Toto with his brother Steve and childhood friends Steve Lukather and David Paich. Jeff Porcaro is renowned among drummers for the drum pattern he used on the Grammy Award-winning Toto song "Rosanna", from the album Toto IV. The drum pattern, called the Half-Time Shuffle Groove, was originally created by drummer Bernard Purdie, who called it the "Purdie Shuffle." Porcaro created his own version of this groove by blending the aforementioned shuffle with John Bonham's groove heard in the Led Zeppelin song "Fool in the Rain", while keeping a Bo Diddley beat on the bass drum. Porcaro describes this groove in detail on a Star Licks video (now DVD) he created shortly after "Rosanna" became popular.

Besides his work with Toto, he was also a highly sought session musician. Porcaro collaborated with many of the biggest names in music, including:

- Herb Alpert
- Lynn Anderson
- The Bee Gees
- George Benson
- Tommy Bolin
- Eric Carmen
- Larry Carlton
- Eric Clapton
- Joe Cocker
- Christopher Cross
- Miles Davis
- Dire Straits
- Donald Fagen
- David Foster
- Stan Getz
- David Gilmour
- Andrew Gold
- Don Henley
- Michael Jackson
- Al Jarreau
- Elton John
- Rickie Lee Jones
- Paul McCartney
- Michael McDonald
- Richard Marx
- Sérgio Mendes
- Jim Messina
- Rhythm Heritage,
- Luis Miguel
- Lee Ritenour
- Leo Sayer
- Boz Scaggs
- Seals and Crofts
- Sonny & Cher
- Steely Dan
- Barbra Streisand
- Frankie Valli
- Joe Walsh

Porcaro contributed drums to four tracks on Michael Jackson's Thriller and also played on Jackson's Dangerous album hit "Heal the World". He is featured on Al Stewart's 1980 album 24 Carrots. Porcaro played on 10cc's ...Meanwhile (1992). On the 1993 10cc Alive album, recorded after his death, the band dedicated "The Stars Didn't Show" to him.

Richard Marx dedicated the song "One Man" to him and said Porcaro was the best drummer he had ever worked with. Michael Jackson made a dedication to Porcaro in the liner notes for his 1995 album HIStory: Past, Present and Future, Book I.

== Personal life and death ==
On October 22, 1983, Porcaro married Susan Norris, a Los Angeles television broadcaster at KABC-TV. Together, they had three sons: Christopher Joseph (1984), Miles Edwin Crawford (1986–2017) and Nico Hendrix (1991).

Porcaro died at Humana Hospital-West Hills on the evening of August 5, 1992, at the age of 38 after falling ill while spraying insecticide in the yard of his Hidden Hills home. The doctors who treated Porcaro attributed his death to a heart attack caused by an allergic reaction to inhaled pesticide. However, a few weeks later the LA county coroner ruled the cause of death to be a heart attack due to occlusive coronary artery disease caused by atherosclerosis resulting from cocaine use, and stated that tests found no trace of pesticides in Porcaro's system. Friends and relatives have rejected this ruling and maintain that the pesticide was to blame. Bandmate Steve Lukather and Porcaro's wife stated they believed that Porcaro had also been suffering from a long-standing heart condition, exacerbated by heavy smoking, which contributed to his death. Lukather noted that several members of Porcaro's family had died at a young age due to heart disease. The history pages of Toto's official website stated that Porcaro died from an allergic reaction to pesticide and made no mention of the cocaine-related ruling.

Porcaro's funeral was attended by musicians Eddie Van Halen and David Crosby, among others. Eulogies were given by Gary Katz (who produced several albums that Porcaro played on) and Porcaro's drumming idol Jim Keltner.

Porcaro's tombstone was inscribed with the following epitaph, comprising lyrics from the Kingdom of Desire track "Wings of Time": "Our love doesn't end here; it lives forever on the Wings of Time."

Porcaro's widow, Susan, remarried. Her husband, Rick Goings, is former chairman of Tupperware Brands; she changed her name to Susan Porcaro Goings.

== Equipment ==
Porcaro was known for using a wide variety of drum equipment throughout his career. He used Gretsch drums early in his career before he switched to Yamaha and later Pearl. He endorsed Paiste cymbals, and also used his signature Regal Tip drumsticks, Zildjian cymbals, Remo drumheads and Drum Workshop pedals.

== Legacy ==
The Jeff Porcaro Memorial Fund was established to benefit the music and art departments of Grant High School in Los Angeles, where he was a student in the early 1970s. A memorial concert took place at the Universal Amphitheater in Los Angeles on December 14, 1992, with an all-star line-up that included George Harrison, Boz Scaggs, Donald Fagen, Don Henley, Michael McDonald, David Crosby, Eddie Van Halen and the members of Toto. The proceeds of the concert were used to establish an education trust fund for Porcaro's sons.

== Discography ==
=== With Toto ===
- Toto (1978)
- Hydra (1979)
- Turn Back (1981)
- Toto IV (1982)
- Isolation (1984)
- Dune [original soundtrack] (1984)
- "Olympic Games 1984 Theme" [original soundtrack] (1984)
- Fahrenheit (1986)
- The Seventh One (1988)
- Past to Present 1977–1990 (1990)
- Kingdom of Desire (1992, released posthumously and dedicated to his memory)
- Toto XX (1998)
- Greatest Hits Live...and More (DVD with behind the scenes footage and interviews)
- Old Is New (2018, posthumous appearance)

=== With other artists ===
- Jack Daugherty - Jack Daugherty and the Class of Nineteen Hundred and Seventy One (1971)
- Seals & Crofts – Diamond Girl (1973); Unborn Child (1974); Get Closer (1976)
- Joe Cocker – I Can Stand a Little Rain (1974); Civilized Man (1984)
- Steely Dan – Pretzel Logic (1974) – "Night by Night", "Parker's Band"; Katy Lied (1975); "FM (No Static at All)" (1978, for the FM movie soundtrack album); Gaucho (1980) – "Gaucho"
- Andrew Gold - All This And Heaven Too (1978) – Thank You For Being a Friend, "Always For You", "I'm On My Way"
- Tommy Bolin – Teaser (1975) – "The Grind", "Homeward Strut", "Dreamer", "Teaser"
- Rhythm Heritage – Disco-fied (1976)
- Les Dudek – Les Dudek (1976)
- Les Dudek - Ghost Town Parade (1978) - "Bound To Be A Change" & "Friend Of Mine"
- Three Dog Night – American Pastime (1976)
- Jackson Browne – The Pretender (1976)
- Leo Sayer – Endless Flight (1976) – "When I Need You"; Thunder in My Heart (1977); Leo Sayer (1978); World Radio (1982); Have You Ever Been in Love (1983)
- Boz Scaggs – Silk Degrees (1976); Down Two Then Left (1977); Middle Man (1980); "Look What You've Done to Me" (1980, featured in the movie Urban Cowboy); "Miss Sun" (1980, released as a single, then included on the compilation Hits!); Other Roads (1988)
- Eric Carmen – Boats Against the Current (1977) – "She Did It", "Boats Against the Current", "Love Is All That Matters"
- Alessi Brothers – Alessi (1977)
- Valerie Carter – Just a Stone's Throw Away (1977); Wild Child (1978)
- Lisa Dal Bello – Lisa Dal Bello (1977)
- Alan O'Day – Appetizers (1977) – "Undercover Angel"
- Hall & Oates – Beauty on a Back Street (1977)
- Lee Ritenour – Captain Fingers (1977) - "Isn't She Lovely"; Rit (album) (1981) - "Mr. Briefcase" & "Good Question"
- Diana Ross – Baby It's Me (1977); Ross (1983)
- Colin Blunstone – Never Even Thought (1978)
- Larry Carlton – Larry Carlton (1978); Sleepwalk (1981); Friends (1983)
- Masayoshi Takanaka – Brasilian Skies (1978)
- Allen Tousssaint – Motion (1978)
- As Frenéticas – Dancin' Days (1978)
- Dave Mason – Mariposa De Oro (1978) – "Will You Still Love Me Tomorrow"
- The Manhattan Transfer – Pastiche (1978); Extensions (1979) – "Birdland", "Twilight Zone / Twilight Tone"; Bodies and Souls (1983); The Offbeat of Avenues (1991) – "Confide in Me"
- Warren Zevon – Excitable Boy (1978) – "Nighttime in the Switching Yard"; The Envoy; Mr. Bad Example (1991)
- Ruben Blades – Nothing but the Truth (1988)
- Bim – Thistles (1978)
- Ted Gärdestad – Blue Virgin Isles (1978)
- Jerry Williams – Gone (1978)
- Al Stewart – Time Passages (1978) – "Valentina Way"
- Marc Jordan – Mannequin (1978)
- The Pointer Sisters – Energy (1978)
- Linda Evans – "You Control Me" (1979)
- Rickie Lee Jones – Rickie Lee Jones (1979); The Magazine (1984)
- Janne Schaffer – Earmeal (1979)
- Lowell George – Thanks, I'll Eat It Here (1979)
- Bill Hughes – Dream Master (1979)
- Pink Floyd – The Wall (1979) – "Mother"
- Airplay – Airplay (1980)
- Aretha Franklin – Aretha (1980); Love All the Hurt Away (1981)
- Klaatu – Endangered Species (1980)
- Mariya Takeuchi – Miss M (1980)
- The Brothers Johnson – Winners (1981)
- Bill Champlin – Runaway (1981) – "Without You"
- Peter Frampton – Breaking All the Rules (1981)
- Bee Gees – Living Eyes (1981) – "Living Eyes", "Soldiers", "Cryin' Every Day"
- Char – U.S.J (1981)
- Christopher Cross – "Arthur's Theme (Best That You Can Do)" (1981); Another Page (1983); Rendezvous (1992)
- Randy Crawford – Secret Combination (1981); Windsong (1982); Nightline (1983)
- Al Jarreau – Breakin' Away (1981) – "Breakin' Away"; "Girls Know How" (1982, soundtrack for movie Night Shift); Jarreau (1983) – "Mornin'", "Step by Step", "Black and Blues"
- Amii Ozaki – Hot Baby (1981)
- Greg Lake – Greg Lake (1981)
- Sarah Vaughan – Songs of the Beatles (1981)
- Crosby, Stills & Nash – Daylight Again (1982); Allies (1983)
- Eye to Eye – Eye to Eye (1982)
- Michael Jackson – Thriller (1982) – "The Girl is Mine", "Beat It", "Human Nature", "The Lady in My Life"; Dangerous (1991) – "Heal the World"
- Donna Summer – Donna Summer (1982) – "Protection"
- Elton John – Jump Up! (1982)
- Melissa Manchester – Hey Ricky (1982) – "You Should Hear How She Talks About You"
- Donald Fagen – The Nightfly (1982)
- Bill LaBounty – Bill LaBounty (1982)
- Herbie Hancock – Lite Me Up (1982) – "Paradise"
- Don Henley – I Can't Stand Still (1982) – "Dirty Laundry"; The End of the Innocence (1989) – "New York Minute"
- Michael McDonald – If That's What It Takes (1982) – "I Keep Forgettin'"; No Lookin' Back (1985); Take It to Heart (1990)
- The Imperials – Stand By The Power (1982)
- George Benson – In Your Eyes (1983) – "Lady Love Me (One More Time)"
- James Newton Howard – James Newton Howard and Friends (1983)
- Lionel Richie – Can't Slow Down (1983) – "Running with the Night"; Louder Than Words (1996) – "The Climbing"
- Paul Simon – Hearts and Bones (1983) – "Train in the Distance"
- Randy Newman – Trouble in Paradise (1983) – "I Love L.A."
- Russ Taff – Walls of Glass (1983) – "Walls of Glass", "Jeremiah", "Inside Look"; Russ Taft (1987) – "I Still Believe"
- Chicago – Chicago 17 (1984) – "Stay the Night"
- David Gilmour – About Face (1984)
- The Jacksons – Victory (1984) – "Torture", "Wait"; 2300 Jackson Street (1989) – "Midnight Rendezvous"
- Paul McCartney – Give My Regards to Broad Street (1984) – "Silly Love Songs"
- Joe Walsh – The Confessor (1985)
- Eric Clapton – Behind the Sun (1985) – "See What Love Can Do", "Forever Man"
- Peter Cetera – Solitude/Solitaire (1986)
- Earth, Wind & Fire – Touch the World (1987) – ''You and I'', ''Every Now and Then''
- Fra Lippo Lippi – Light and Shade (1987)
- Roger Hodgson – Hai Hai (1987)
- David Benoit – Freedom at Midnight (1987); Shadows (1991)
- Jon Anderson – In the City of Angels (1988)
- Luis Miguel – Busca Una Mujer (1988)
- Love and Money – Strange Kind of Love (1988)
- Patti Austin – The Real Me (1988); Love Is Gonna Getcha (1990)
- Dr. John – In a Sentimental Mood (1989)
- Nik Kershaw – The Works (1989) – "Walkabout"
- Poco – Legacy (1989)
- Clair Marlo – Let It Go (1989)
- Anri - Circuit of Rainbow (1989)
- Celine Dion – Have a Heart (1989)
- Natalie Cole – Good to Be Back (1989) – ''The Rest Of The Night'', "Miss You Like Crazy", ''Gonna Make You Mine'', "Starting Over Again"
- Benny Hester – Perfect (1989)
- Madonna – Like a Prayer (1989) – "Cherish"; I'm Breathless (1990) – "Hanky Panky"
- Jude Cole – A View from 3rd Street (1990) – "Compared to Nothing"; Start the Car (1992) – "Open Road", "Tell the Truth"
- Sandi Patty – "Another Time...Another Place" (1990)
- Bruce Springsteen – "Viva Las Vegas" (1990, included in the collective album The Last Temptation of Elvis and featured in the movie Honeymoon in Vegas); Human Touch (1992)
- Bryan Duncan – Anonymous Confessions of a Lunatic Friend (1990)
- Emily Remler – This Is Me (1990)
- Cher – Mermaids (1990) – "The Shoop Shoop Song (It's in His Kiss)"; Love Hurts (1991) – "Could've Been You"
- Michael Bolton – Time, Love & Tenderness (1991) – "When a Man Loves a Woman"
- Dire Straits – On Every Street (1991)
- Richard Marx – Rush Street (1991); Paid Vacation (1994) – "One Man"
- Bonnie Raitt – Luck of the Draw (1991); - "Luck of the Draw"
- Rod Stewart – Vagabond Heart (1991) – "The Motown Song"
- Curtis Stigers – Curtis Stigers (1991)
- Ricky Gianco – E' rock & roll (1991)
- Paul Brady – Trick or Treat (1991)
- B-52s – Good Stuff (1992)
- Go West – Indian Summer (1992)
- 10cc – ...Meanwhile (1992); Woman In Love (1992); Welcome To Paradise (1992)
- Sergio Mendes – Brasileiro (1992)
- Bruce Springsteen – Human Touch (1992) – "Human Touch"
- Roger Waters – Amused to Death (1992) – "It's a Miracle"
- Paul Young – The Crossing (1993)
- David Crosby – Thousand Roads (1993)
- Patti Scialfa – Rumble Doll (1993) – "Come Tomorrow", "Talk to Me Like the Rain"
- Steve Porcaro – Someday/Somehow (2016) – "Back to You"

== Books ==
- Flans, Robyn (2020). It's about Time: Jeff Porcaro, the Man and His Music. Hudson Music. ISBN 978-1-705-11229-8. Foreword by Jim Keltner.
- Flans, Robyn (2024). Moments in Time: Jeff Porcaro Stories. Hudson Music. ISBN 979-8-350-11455-3.

=== Academic paper ===
- Räsänen, E; Pulkkinen, O; Virtanen, T; et al. (June 3, 2015). "Fluctuations of Hi-Hat Timing and Dynamics in a Virtuoso Drum Track of a Popular Music Recording". PLOS One. 10 (6) e0127902. Bibcode:2015PLoSO..1027902R. doi:10.1371/journal.pone.0127902. PMC 4454559. PMID 26039256.

== See also ==
- Rosanna shuffle, a drum pattern
