= Boz Scaggs & Band =

Studio album by Boz Scaggs
- Released: Dec 1971
- Studio: Olympic Studios, London, CBS Studios, New York City and CBS Studios, San Francisco
- Genre: R&B
- Label: Columbia
- Producer: Boz Scaggs, Glyn Johns

Boz Scaggs chronology
Moments (1971)	Boz Scaggs & Band (1971)	My Time (1972)

Professional ratings
Review scores
Source	Rating
Christgau's Record Guide	B+

Boz Scaggs & Band is the fourth album by Boz Scaggs, and his second on the Columbia Records label. It was released in December 1971.

== Track listing ==
All tracks written by Boz Scaggs, except where indicated.

Side One

1. "Monkey Time" (Scaggs, Clive Arrowsmith)
2. "Runnin' Blue" (Scaggs, Pat O'Hara)
3. "Up to You" (Scaggs, Arrowsmith)
4. "Love Anyway"
5. "Flames of Love" (Scaggs, Arrowsmith)

Side Two

1. "Here to Stay"
2. "Nothing Will Take Your Place"
3. "Why Why" (Scaggs, Tim Davis)
4. "You're So Good"

== Personnel ==
- Boz Scaggs – lead vocals, guitar
- Mel Martin – tenor, alto and baritone saxophones, flute
- Tom Poole – trumpet, flugelhorn
- Pat O'Hara – trombone
- Doug Simril – guitar, piano
- Joachim Young – organ, piano, vibraphone
- David Brown - bass
- George Rains – drums, percussion

Additional personnel

- Chepito Areas – congas and timbales on "Flames of Love"
- Michael Carabello – congas and timbales on "Flames of Love"
- Lee Charleton – saw and harp on "Here to Stay"
- Rita Coolidge Ensemble – backing vocals on "Flames of Love"
- Dorothy Morrison – backing vocals on "Flames of Love"

Technical

- Clive Arrowsmith – photography
