= Boz Scaggs =

American singer, songwriter and guitarist (born 1944)

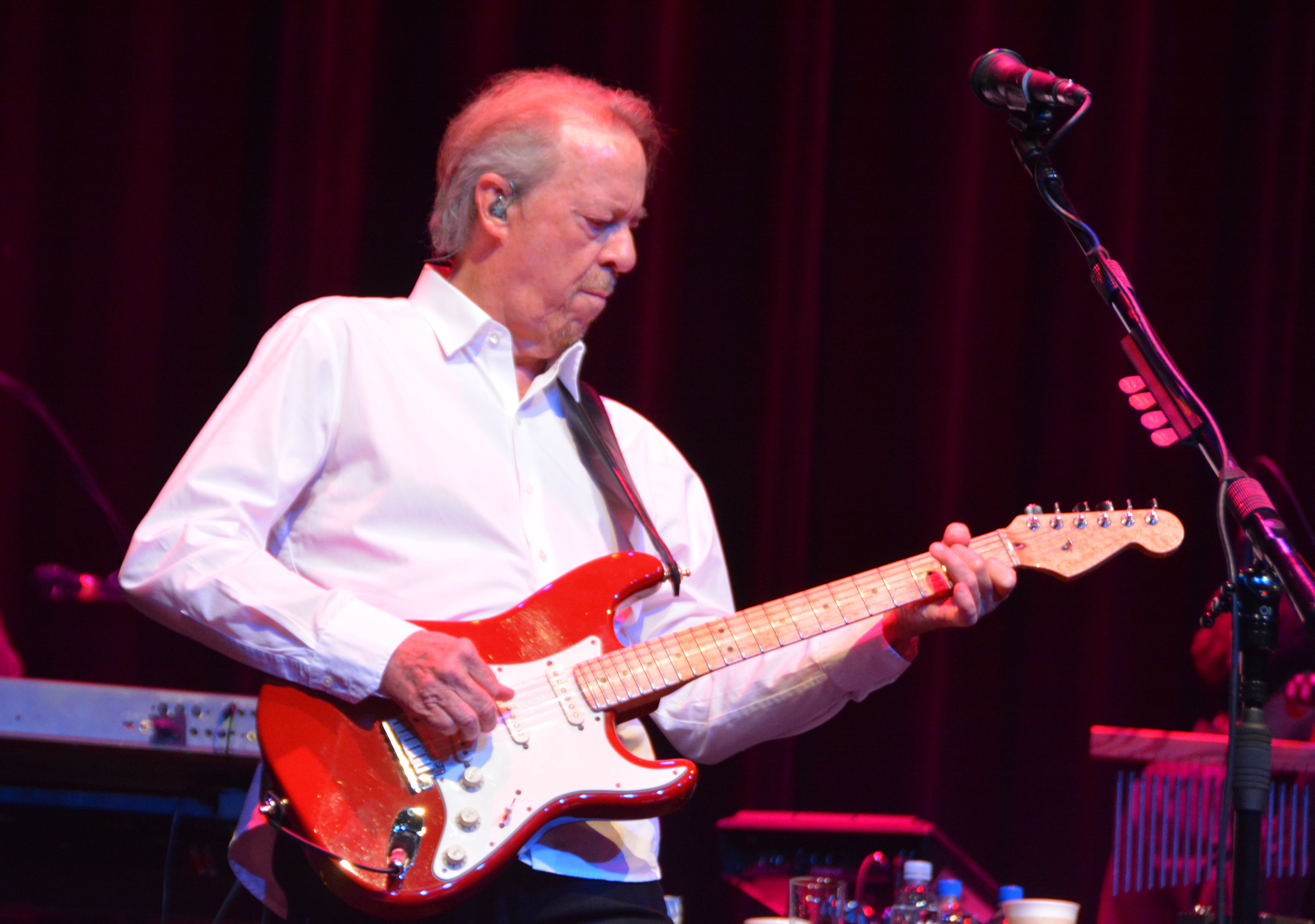
- Scaggs in 2015

Background information
- Born: William Royce Scaggs; June 8, 1944 (age 82); Canton, Ohio, U.S.
- Origin: Plano, Texas, U.S.
- Genres: Blues; blue-eyed soul; jazz; R&B; soft rock
- Occupations: Singer; songwriter; guitarist
- Instruments: Guitar; vocals
- Years active: 1963–present
- Labels: Concord; Columbia; Atlantic; Virgin; 429
- Website: bozscaggs.com

William Royce "Boz" Scaggs (born June 8, 1944) is an American singer, songwriter, and guitarist. He was a bandmate of Steve Miller in the Ardells in the early 1960s and a member of the Steve Miller Band from 1967 to 1968.

Scaggs began his solo career in 1969, though he lacked a major hit until his 1976 album, Silk Degrees, peaked at number 2 on the Billboard 200 and produced the hit singles "Lido Shuffle" and "Lowdown". Scaggs produced two more platinum-certified albums in Down Two Then Left and Middle Man, the latter of which produced the top-40 singles "Breakdown Dead Ahead" and "Jojo".

After a hiatus for most of the 1980s, he returned to recording and touring in 1988, releasing Other Roads and later joining the New York Rock and Soul Revue. Scaggs opened the nightclub Slim's, a popular music venue in San Francisco (it closed in 2020). He has continued to record and tour throughout the 1990s, 2000s and 2010s, with his most recent albums being 2018's Out of the Blues and 2025's Detour.

Scaggs is credited for helping the formation of Toto. For his 1976 album, Silk Degrees, he hand-picked musicians after taking suggestions from several people. These musicians were David Paich, David Hungate and Jeff Porcaro. The three were already friends and had frequently performed together on other albums, such as Steely Dan's Pretzel Logic. By going on tour with Scaggs, it solidified the prospect of starting a band. Columbia picked up on this talent by offering the new group a contract "without audition". Steve Porcaro described this as "a record deal thrown in our laps". Paich stated, "I'm not sure if Toto would have happened as soon, or quite the same way, without Silk Degrees". Their friendship has continued throughout the decades, shown by the varying collaborations and concerts performed together. Paich teamed up once more for Scaggs' 2001 album, Dig, contributing to 6 out of the 11 songs.

== Early life, family and education ==
Scaggs was born in Canton, Ohio, the eldest child to Royce and Helen Scaggs. His father was a traveling salesman who had flown in the Army Air Corps during World War II. Their family moved to McAlester, Oklahoma, then to Plano, Texas (at that time a farm town), just north of Dallas. He learned his first instrument, the cello, at age 9. He received a scholarship to attend a private school in Dallas, St. Mark's School of Texas.

At St. Mark's, he met Steve Miller, who helped him to learn the guitar at age 12. A classmate wanted to give Scaggs a "weird" nickname. This started out as "Bosley", then "Boswell" and "Bosworth". The name was later shortened to Boz.

== Career ==
=== Early years ===
In 1959, he became the vocalist for Steve Miller's band, the Marksmen. After graduation in 1962, the pair later attended the University of Wisconsin–Madison together, playing in blues bands like the Ardells and the Fabulous Knight Trains.

Scaggs left school in 1963 to pursue a career in music. He signed up for the Army Reserve and formed a new band, the Wigs with John "Toad" Andrews and Bob Arthur. By 1965, the band joined the burgeoning R&B scene in London. Achieving little success, the group disbanded within a few months. Scaggs traveled throughout Europe, earning money by busking. He arrived in Stockholm, Sweden, where he recorded his first solo debut album, Boz, in 1965 with the Karusell Grammofon AB label, which failed commercially. He had a brief stint with the band the Other Side with Mac MacLeod and Jack Downing.

Returning to the US, Scaggs promptly headed for the booming psychedelic music center of San Francisco in 1967 after receiving a postcard invitation from Steve Miller to join his band. He appeared on the Steve Miller Band's first two albums, Children of the Future and Sailor in 1968. He left the band due to different music tastes and tension between himself and Miller at the time. Scaggs secured a solo contract with Atlantic Records in 1968, releasing his second album, Boz Scaggs, a year later. It was produced by Jann Wenner (co-founder of the magazine Rolling Stone) and features the Muscle Shoals Rhythm Section and session guitarist Duane Allman. Despite good reviews, this release achieved only moderate sales. Scaggs briefly hooked up with San Francisco Bay Area band Mother Earth in a supporting role on their second album Make a Joyful Noise on guitar and backup vocals.

Scaggs signed with Columbia Records releasing the albums Moments in 1971 and My Time in 1972. These first Columbia albums were modest sellers. Seeking a new more soulful direction, Columbia brought in former Motown producer Johnny Bristol for Scaggs' next album, Slow Dancer (1974). Although the album only made No. 81 on the US Billboard Album Chart, it subsequently attained gold status, no doubt getting a boost from the huge success of Scaggs's next album, Silk Degrees.

=== 1976–1981: the hit years ===
In 1976, using session musicians who later formed the band Toto, he recorded Silk Degrees, with Joe Wissert on producing duties. The album, which received a Grammy nomination for album of the year and a further nomination for Wissert as Producer of the Year, reached No. 2 on the US Billboard 200, and No. 1 in a number of other countries, spawning four hit singles: "It's Over", "Lowdown", "What Can I Say", and "Lido Shuffle", as well as the poignant ballad "We're All Alone", which Rita Coolidge (who had performed backing vocals on an earlier Scaggs album) took to the top of the charts in 1977. "Lowdown" sold over one million copies in the US and won the Grammy Award for Best R&B Song, which was shared by Scaggs and David Paich. In Saturday Night Fever, John Travolta choreographed his dance to "Lowdown".

In an interview, Travolta states "The Bee Gees weren't even involved in the movie in the beginning, I was dancing to Stevie Wonder and Boz Scaggs." However, Columbia denied the song's use as there was another disco movie using "Lowdown" (Looking for Mr. Goodbar).

A sellout world tour followed. Scaggs was performing at Avery Fisher Hall (now the David Geffen Hall) in New York's Lincoln Center during the infamous July 13th New York City blackout in 1977. He was around 15 minutes into the concert when the power went out. Scaggs told the audience to save their ticket stubs as he would do a repeat concert on the Friday night, a few days after. Scaggs performed with Fleetwood Mac for a few concerts between 1976 and 1977.

His follow-up album in 1977 Down Two Then Left did not sell as well as Silk Degrees and neither of its singles reached the Top 40. For Down Two Then Left, Scaggs continued working with future members of Toto as well as Ray Parker Jr, member of the band Raydio who would later write and perform the Ghostbusters theme song in 1984.

The 1980 album Middle Man spawned two top 20 hits, "Breakdown Dead Ahead" (No. 15, Hot 100) and "Jojo" (No. 17, Hot 100); and Scaggs also enjoyed two more top 20 hits in 1980–81, "Look What You've Done to Me", from the Urban Cowboy soundtrack, and "Miss Sun", from a greatest hits set, both reaching No. 14 on the Hot 100. "Miss Sun" was an unreleased Toto demo from 1977 .

=== Later career ===
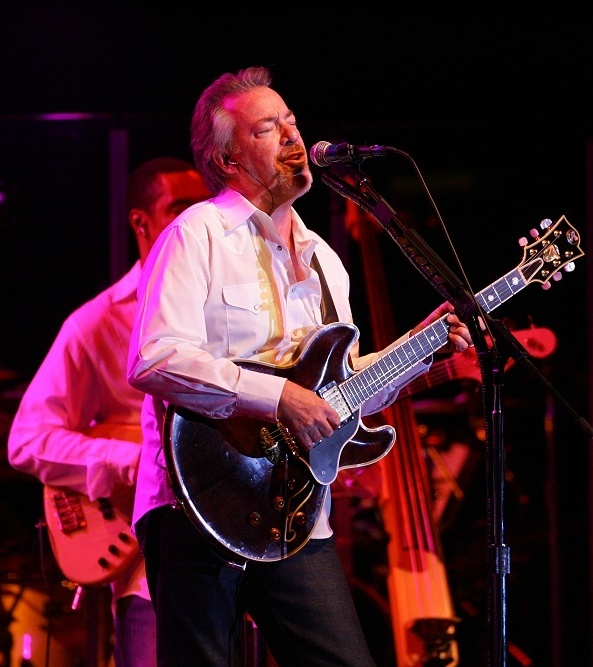
Scaggs in concert in 2006

Scaggs took a long break from recording as he felt making music had become a "career" and that music had "left him". He did attempt to make a new album in 1983, but "it didn't feel right". In 1985, he succumbed to feelings of anxiety and felt he had to get a record out as there was "something very big missing" in his life.

Scaggs' next album, Other Roads, did not appear until 1988 due to Columbia rejecting the record as "they didn't feel they had a strong hit single", making Scaggs spend more time perfecting the album. "Heart of Mine", from Other Roads, is Scaggs' last top-40 hit as of 2018. Also in 1988, he opened the San Francisco nightclub, Slim's, and remained the owner of the venue until the club's closure in 2020.

In 1992, Scaggs performed at Toto's tribute concert for Jeff Porcaro, along with Don Henley, Donald Fagen, Eddie Van Halen, George Harrison, and Michael McDonald.

His next solo release was the album Some Change in 1994. He issued Come On Home, an album of rhythm and blues, and My Time: A Boz Scaggs Anthology, an anthology, in 1997.

In the summer of 1998, Boz toured as the opening act for Stevie Nicks.

After another hiatus from recording, his next album, Dig, received good reviews. However, the CD was released on an unfortunate date – September 11, 2001. In May 2003, Scaggs released But Beautiful, a collection of jazz standards that debuted at number one on the jazz chart. In 2008 he released Speak Low, which he described in the liner notes as "a sort of progressive, experimental effort ... along the lines of some of the ideas that Gil Evans explored." During 2004, he released a DVD and a live 16-track CD Greatest Hits Live that was recorded August 2003 at the Great American Music Hall in San Francisco. Dig was re-released in 2006, with the exception of the song "Get on the Natch".

After a break in recording, he undertook a series of shows across the US in 2008. Two years later he joined Donald Fagen and Michael McDonald for concerts entitled the Dukes of September Rhythm Revue.

His next album Memphis was released in March 2013. It was recorded in that Southern American city at the Royal Studios. The album included some of his favorite compositions from other artists. A tour of the United States, Canada and Japan followed the release. Before the year ended, he added live dates across North America and Australia for 2014. In 2015, he released A Fool to Care, a compilation of mostly covers, including "Whispering Pines" with Lucinda Williams, and one original blues composition, "Hell to Pay", performed with Bonnie Raitt. The album rose to number 1 on the Billboard Blues Album chart and number 54 on the Billboard 200. In 2018, he released Out of the Blues, reaching number 1 on the Billboard Top Blues Albums chart.

In February 2024, he made his first post-pandemic visit to Japan, touring for seven shows in five locations throughout the country. From the stage of his Tokyo show, he announced that he would donate the guitars he used for his Japan tour to a charity auction to support the recovery from the 2024 Noto Peninsula Earthquake which had struck on New Year's Day that year.

== Personal life ==
Scaggs married Donna Carmella Storniola, his first wife, in 1973. They had two sons, Austin and Oscar. Scaggs and Carmella divorced in 1980 and three and a half years later, Scaggs won joint custody of his sons. Austin is now a music journalist for Rolling Stone. Oscar died on December 31, 1998, from a heroin overdose. Carmella died in February 2017.

In 1992, Scaggs married Dominique Gioia. In 1996, they moved to Napa Valley and planted 2.2 acres of Grenache, Mourvedre, Syrah, and Counoise grapes. In 2000 they made their first wine, and in 2006 Scaggs Vineyard was certified organic. In 2016, Scaggs sold his plot to Newfound Wines.

In October 2017, the couple's house burned down in the Northern California wildfires. He and his wife were on tour at the time. He lost everything: the vineyard, cars, and sentimental objects such as decades worth of legal pads and cocktail napkins with lyrics on them.

== Awards and nominations ==
Grammy Awards
Year	Type	Category	For
1977	Nominee	Album of the Year	Silk Degrees
1977	Nominee	Best R&B Vocal Performance, Male	"Lowdown"
1977	Nominee	Best Pop Vocal Performance, Male	Silk Degrees
1977	Nominee	Best Recording Package	Silk Degrees
1977	Winner	Best Rhythm & Blues Song	"Lowdown"
1981	Nominee	Best Album of Original Score Written for a Motion Picture or a Television Special	"Look What You've Done to Me"
1998	Nominee	Best Contemporary Blues Album	Come On Home
2019	Nominee	Best Contemporary Blues Album	Out of the Blues

In 2019, Scaggs was awarded the Texas Medal of Arts.

== Discography ==
=== With the Steve Miller Band ===
Year	Album	US
1968	Children of the Future	134
1968	Sailor	24

=== Solo albums ===
Year	Title	Peak chart positions				Certifications
Year	Title	US	US R&B	AUS	UK	Certifications
1965	Boz	—	—	—N/a	—	
1969	Boz Scaggs*	171	—	—N/a	—	
1971	Moments	124	—	—	—	
1971	Boz Scaggs & Band	198	—	—	—	
1972	My Time	138	—	—	—	
1974	Slow Dancer	81	—	62	—	RIAA: Gold
1976	Silk Degrees	2	6	1	20	RIAA: 5× Platinum; ARIA: 6× Platinum; BPI: Silver
1977	Down Two Then Left	11	—	4	55	RIAA: Platinum; ARIA: 2× Platinum
1980	Middle Man	8	36	11	52	RIAA: Platinum
1988	Other Roads	47	—	35	—	
1994	Some Change	91	—	—	—	
1996	Fade into Light	—	—	—	—	
1997	Come On Home	94	—	—	—	
2001	Dig	146	—	—	—	
2003	But Beautiful	167	—	—	—	
2008	Speak Low	128	—	—	—	
2013	Memphis	17	—	—	—	
2015	A Fool to Care	54	—	—	—	
2018	Out of the Blues	82	—	—	—	
2025	Detour	—	—	—	—	
"—" denotes releases that did not chart or were not released in that territory.

* While the 1969 self-titled Atlantic album failed to chart upon initial release, it peaked at No. 171 when reissued in 1974. Three years later the album was reissued once again, this time as remixed by Tom Perry at Sound City in Los Angeles in October 1977. This version only bubbled under the Billboard 200, reaching No. 209, but the remix has been used for most subsequent reissues. In 2015 a 2CD was released combining both the 1969 original version and the 1977 remixed version. Rolling Stone ranked the original release at number 496 on its list of the 500 Greatest Albums of All Time.

=== Compilation albums ===
Year	Album	Peak chart positions		Certifications
Year	Album	US	AUS	Certifications
1980	Hits!	24	9	RIAA: Platinum
1984	His Greatest Hits	—	28	
1997	My Time: A Boz Scaggs Anthology	—	—	
2004	Greatest Hits Live	—	—	
2013	The Essential Boz Scaggs	—	—	
2019	Japanese Singles Collection-Greatest Hits-	—	—	
"—" denotes releases that did not chart or were not released in that territory.

=== Singles ===
Year	Title	Peak chart positions								Certifications	Album
Year	Title	US	US AC	CAN	CAN AC	UK	IRE	AUS	NZ	Certifications	Album
1971	"We Were Always Sweethearts"	61	—	40	—	—	—	—	—		Moments
1971	"Near You"	96	—	—	—	—	—	—	—		Moments
1972	"Dinah Flo"	86	—	—	—	—	—	—	—		My Time
1976	"It's Over"	38	—	79	—	—	—	63	—		Silk Degrees
1976	"Lowdown"	3	11	2	7	28	—	54	35	RIAA: 2× Platinum; RMNZ: Gold	Silk Degrees
1976	"What Can I Say"	42	35	55	21	10	—	2	—		Silk Degrees
1977	"Lido Shuffle"	11	—	5	—	13	—	2	18	RIAA: Platinum; RMNZ: Platinum	Silk Degrees
1977	"Hard Times"	58	—	79	—	—	—	40	—		Down Two Then Left
1978	"Hollywood"	49	—	44	23	33	19	43	7		Down Two Then Left
1980	"Breakdown Dead Ahead"	15	—	8	—	—	—	64	—		Middle Man
1980	"Jojo"	17	29	15	—	—	—	73	—		Middle Man
1980	"Look What You've Done to Me"	14	3	30	41	—	—	—	—		Urban Cowboy (soundtrack)
1980	"Miss Sun"	14	13	33	—	—	—	—	—		Hits!
1988	"Heart of Mine"	35	3	25	—	—	—	60	—		Other Roads
1988	"Cool Running"	—	39	43	—	—	—	—	—		Other Roads
1994	"Some Change"	—	—	38	—	—	—	—	—		Some Change
1994	"I'll Be the One"	—	—	68	—	—	—	—	—		Some Change

== See also ==
- In Memory of Elizabeth Reed
- List of celebrities who own wineries and vineyards
- Notable alumni of St. Mark's School of Texas
