= Slow Dancer =

- 1977 re-release cover

Studio album by Boz Scaggs
- Released: March 1974
- Recorded: 1973–1974
- Studio: Devonshire Sound Studios (North Hollywood)
- Genres: Soul; Philadelphia soul • Soft Rock • Pop Rock • Yacht Rock
- Length: 36:35
- Label: Columbia
- Producer: Johnny Bristol

Boz Scaggs chronology
My Time (1972)	Slow Dancer (1974)	Silk Degrees (1976)

Professional ratings
Review scores
Source	Rating
Allmusic	4.5/5 stars
Christgau's Record Guide	B−

Slow Dancer is the sixth album by Boz Scaggs released by Columbia in 1974. Initially, the album was released with a cover photo of Scaggs walking alone on the beach, with the back of the album framing a head and shoulders shot of Scaggs lying on the beach. The cover photographs were taken by Annie Leibovitz. After the breakout success of 1976's Silk Degrees, Slow Dancer was re-released with a new cover showing Scaggs and a woman in fine clothing, with Scaggs bending to kiss her bosom. This photo was taken by Ethan Russell.

== Track listing ==
All tracks composed by Boz Scaggs, except where indicated

Side One

1. "You Make It So Hard (To Say No)" - 3:31
2. "Slow Dancer" (George Daly, Scaggs) - 3:13
3. "Angel Lady (Come Just In Time)" (Johnny Bristol, Jim McDonough, Scaggs) - 3:28
4. "There Is Someone Else" - 4:32
5. "Hercules" (Allen Toussaint) - 4:03

Side Two

1. "Pain of Love" (Johnny Bristol) -3:11
2. "Sail on White Moon" (Johnny Bristol) - 3:13
3. "Let It Happen" (Johnny Bristol, Scaggs) - 3:18
4. "I Got Your Number" (Johnny Bristol, Gregory Reeves) - 3:43
5. "Take It for Granted" - 4:19

== Personnel ==
- Boz Scaggs – vocals, guitar
- David Cohen, David T. Walker, Dennis Coffey, Greg Poree, Jay Graydon, Wah Wah Watson, Red Rhodes – guitars
- Clarence McDonald, Jerry Peters, Joe Sample, Mike Melvoin, Russell Turner – keyboards
- James Jamerson, Jim Hughart – bass guitar
- Ernie Watts, Fred Jackson, John Kelson – saxophone
- George Bohanon, Lon Norman – trombone
- Chuck Findley, Jack H. Laubach, Paul Hubinon, Warren Roché – trumpet, flugelhorn
- Gene Estes, John Arnold – percussion, vibraphone
- Ed Greene, James Gadson – drums
- Joe Clayton, King Errison – congas
- Carolyn Willis, Julia Tillman Waters, Lorna Willard, Myrna Matthews, Pat Henderson – background vocals
- H.B. Barnum – string arrangements, conductor

Technical

- Producer – Johnny Bristol
- Engineer – Greg Venable
- Remix – Al Schmitt
- Photography – Ethan Russell
- Artwork by Tony Lane

== Charts ==
Chart (1974–77)	Position
Australia (Kent Music Report)	62
United States (Billboard 200)	81

== Certifications ==
Region	Certification	Certified units/sales
United States (RIAA)	Gold	500,000^{^}
^{^} Shipments figures based on certification alone.
