= Breakdown Dead Ahead =

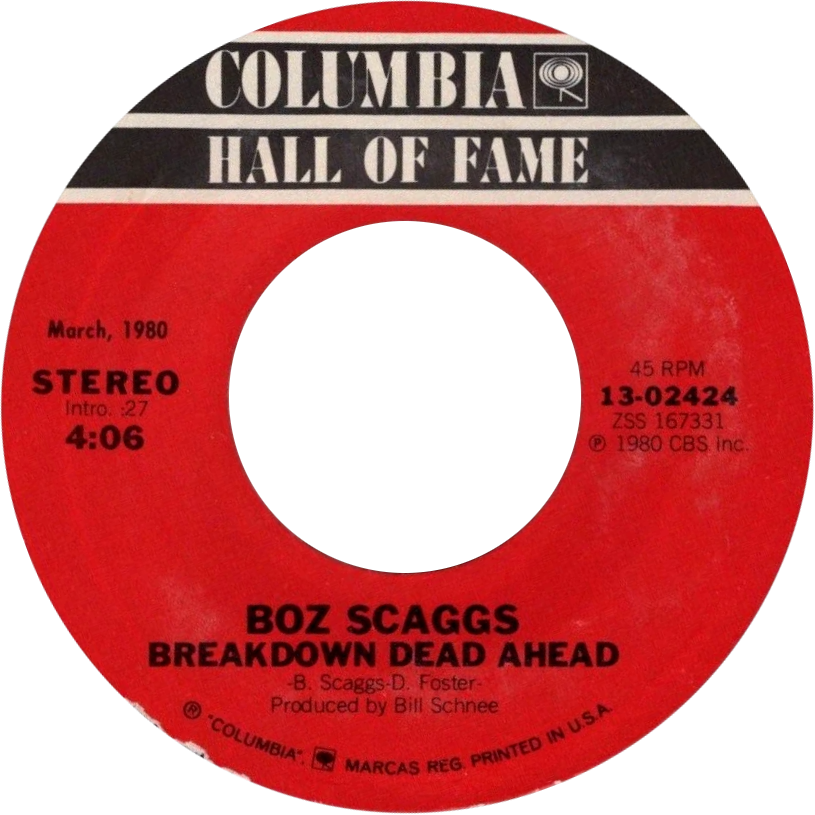
- One of US reissues

Single by Boz Scaggs

from the album Middle Man
- B-side: "Isn't It Time"
- Released: March 1980
- Recorded: 1979
- Genre: Rock
- Length: 4:06 (radio edit); 4:35 (LP version)
- Label: Columbia
- Songwriters: Boz Scaggs; David Foster
- Producer: Bill Schnee

Boz Scaggs singles chronology
"Hollywood" (1978)	"Breakdown Dead Ahead" (1980)	"Jojo" (1980)

"Breakdown Dead Ahead" is a 1980 song recorded by Boz Scaggs, and composed by Scaggs and David Foster. It was the lead single of two released from Scaggs's album Middle Man.

During May, the song reached number 15 on the US Billboard Hot 100 and number 12 on the Cash Box Top 100. The song was a bigger hit in Canada, where it spent two weeks at number eight on the Pop chart.

== Charts ==
=== Weekly charts ===
Chart (1980)	Peak position
Australia (Kent Music Report)	64
Canada Top Singles (RPM)	8
US Billboard Hot 100	15
US Cash Box Top 100	12

=== Year-end charts ===
Chart (1980)	Rank
Canada	67
US Billboard Hot 100	97
US Cash Box Top 100	93

== Personnel ==
- Rick Marotta – drums
- Boz Scaggs – lead vocals, guitar
- David Foster – acoustic piano
- Don Grolnick – electric piano
- Lenny Castro – percussion
- David Hungate – bass
- Steve Lukather – additional guitars, guitar solo
- Ray Parker Jr. – guitar
- Paulette K Brown – background vocals
- Venetta Fields – background vocals
- Bill Thedford – background vocals
