= My Time (album) =

Studio album by Boz Scaggs
- Released: September 1972
- Recorded: 1972
- Studios: Muscle Shoals Sound Studio (Sheffield); CBS Studios (San Francisco)
- Genres: Rock; blue-eyed soul
- Length: 32:32
- Label: Columbia
- Producers: Boz Scaggs, Roy Halee

Boz Scaggs chronology
Boz Scaggs & Band (1971)	My Time (1972)	Slow Dancer (1974)

Professional ratings
Review scores
Source	Rating
Christgau's Record Guide	B

My Time is the fifth album by Boz Scaggs, released by Columbia Records in September 1972. "Dinah Flo" was the only single released from the album.

== Track listing ==
All songs written by Boz Scaggs unless noted.

Side One

1. "Dinah Flo" - 3:03
2. "Slowly in the West" (David Brown) - 3:56
3. "Full-Lock Power Slide" - 3:09
4. "Old Time Lovin' " (Al Green) - 2:52
5. "Might Have to Cry" - 4:03

Side Two

1. "Hello My Lover" (Allen Toussaint) - 3:23
2. "Freedom for the Stallion" (Allen Toussaint) - 2:32
3. "He's a Fool for You" - 3:46
4. "We're Gonna Roll" - 2:52
5. "My Time" - 2:56

== Production ==
=== Tracks 1, 2, 5, 6, 8 & 10 ===
- Produced by Boz Scaggs
- Recorded at Muscle Shoals Sound Studios, Sheffield, Alabama.

=== Tracks 3, 4, 7 & 9 ===
- Produced by Roy Halee and Boz Scaggs
- Recorded at CBS Studios, San Francisco, CA.

=== Other Credits ===
- Graphics – Anne Garner
- Photography – Ethan A. Russell

== Personnel ==
=== Tracks 1, 2, 5, 6, 8 & 10 ===
- Boz Scaggs – vocals, electric guitar
- Pete Carr – electric guitar
- Jimmy Johnson – electric guitar
- Eddie Hinton – acoustic guitar
- Barry Beckett – acoustic piano
- Clayton Ivey – organ, keyboards
- David Hood – bass guitar
- Roger Hawkins – drums
- Charles Chalmers – saxophone, backing vocals
- Sandra Chalmers – backing vocals
- Donna Rhodes – backing vocals

Horns performed by Muscle Shoals Horns

=== Tracks 3, 4, 7 & 9 ===
- Boz Scaggs – vocals, electric guitar
- Joachim Young – keyboards
- David Brown - bass
- George Rains – drums
- Dorothy Morrison – backing vocals
- Linda Tillery – backing vocals

Horns on "Stallion" and "Old Time Lovin'" by Bob Ferreira, Tom Harrell, Mel Martin and Jim Rothermel. Horns on "We're Gonna Roll" by Jack Scherer and Jules Broussard.
