= Jojo (Boz Scaggs song) =

1980 single by Boz Scaggs

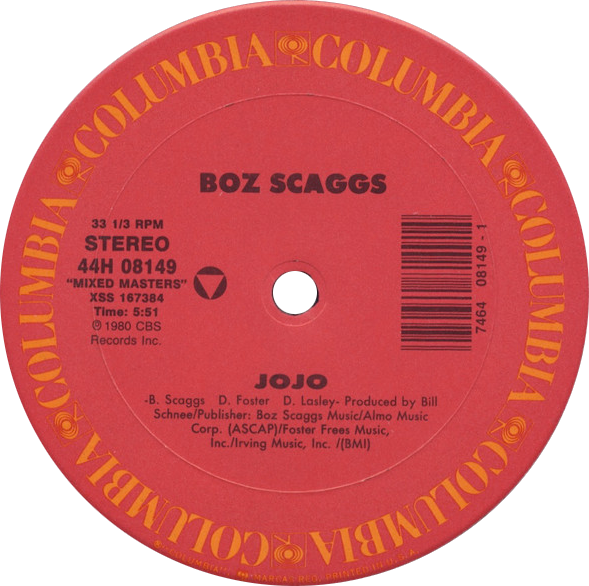
- One of US reissues

Single by Boz Scaggs

from the album Middle Man
- B-side: "Do Like You Do in New York"
- Released: June 1980
- Genre: Pop rock, Blue-eyed soul
- Length: 4:09 (single version); 5:51 (album & 12" version)
- Label: Columbia
- Songwriters: Boz Scaggs; David Foster; David Lasley
- Producer: Bill Schnee

Boz Scaggs singles chronology
"Breakdown Dead Ahead" (1980)	"Jojo" (1980)	"Look What You've Done to Me" (1980)

Official audio
- "JoJo" on YouTube

"Jojo" is a song by Boz Scaggs. It was released in 1980 as the second single from his album Middle Man. The song talks about a pimp working in Broadway.

Like the album's other single "Breakdown Dead Ahead", the song was a top 20 hit, peaking at No. 17 on the Billboard Hot 100.

== Charts ==
=== Weekly charts ===
Chart (1980)	Peak position
Australia (Kent Music Report)	73
Canada Top Singles (RPM)	15
US Billboard Hot 100	17
US Billboard Hot Adult Contemporary Tracks	29
US Billboard Hot Soul Singles	17

=== Year-end charts ===
Chart (1980)	Position
U.S. Billboard Hot 100	89
