= Other Roads =

Studio album by Boz Scaggs
- Released: May 16, 1988
- Recorded: 1987–1988
- Studios: Schnee Studios (North Hollywood); Ocean Way Recording (Hollywood)
- Genres: Rock; pop rock
- Length: 45:06 (vinyl) / 50:08 (CD)
- Label: Columbia
- Producers: Bill Schnee; Stewart Levine; David Williams; Boz Scaggs

Boz Scaggs chronology
Hits! (1980)	Other Roads (1988)	Some Change (1994)

Singles from Other Roads
- 1. "Heart of Mine" Released: April 22, 1988; 2. "Cool Running" Released: July 1988

Other Roads is the tenth studio album by Boz Scaggs released on May 16, 1988. After an eight-year hiatus from recording, Scaggs returned in 1988 with this album, a record aimed primarily at the adult contemporary market.

The album reached No. 47 on the Billboard Top Pop album chart, while the lead single “Heart of Mine” was a big success on the Adult Contemporary chart, peaking at No. 3. The said single also reached the Top 40 on the Billboard Hot 100 chart, peaking at No. 35, Scaggs' last appearance on that chart to date.

== Overview ==
Artists such as Pamela Hutchinson of The Emotions, James Ingram, Phil Perry, David Paich, Jeff Porcaro and Steve Lukather of Toto, Siedah Garrett and Marcus Miller appeared on the album.

== Critical reception ==
Professional ratings
Review scores
Source	Rating
AllMusic	3/5 stars
Orlando Sentinel	3/5 stars

In their retrospective review, AllMusic praised both Scaggs's vocal performance and the unusual stylistic mix and tones of the songs. They concluded, "Scaggs tried hard to walk a line between the decade's obsession with more processed studio sounds that utilized electronic keyboards and drum machines up front, while relying more heavily on electric guitars and kit drums. He doesn't always succeed in keeping the balance, but the attempt sets him apart from most mainstream acts at that time."

== Track listing ==
No.	Title	Writer(s)	Length
1.	"What's Number One?"	Boz Scaggs; Marcus Miller; Jim Carroll	3:58
2.	"Claudia"	Scaggs; Larry Williams	4:07
3.	"Heart of Mine"	Scaggs; Bobby Caldwell; Dennis Matkosky; Jason Scheff	4:12
4.	"Right out of My Head"	Scaggs; Dann Huff	5:24
5.	"I Don't Hear You"	Huff; Carroll	4:41
6.	"Mental Shakedown"	Scaggs; Huff; Guy Allison	4:10
7.	"Soul to Soul" (CD bonus track)	Scaggs; Miller; Lamont Dozier	5:02
8.	"Crimes of Passion"	Huff; Carroll	4:00
9.	"Funny"	Scaggs; Miller	5:49
10.	"Cool Running"	Scaggs; Patrick Leonard; David Williams	4:14
11.	"The Night of Van Gogh"	Scaggs; Caldwell; Peter Wolf	4:20
Total length:			50:08

== Personnel ==
=== Musicians ===
- Boz Scaggs – lead vocals, backing vocals (4)
- Rhett Lawrence – keyboards (1), drums (1), programming (5), keyboard programming (8)
- Peter Wolf – keyboards (1)
- Marcus Miller – keyboard programming (1), bass (1, 7–10), synthesizer drums (8), percussion (8), clarinet (8), rhythm arrangements (1)
- Larry Williams – keyboards (2), saxophones (9), rhythm arrangements (2), horn arrangements (9)
- Aaron Zigman – keyboards (3), synthesizers (3), Yamaha DX7 (3), rhythm arrangements (3), synth horns (6)
- Robbie Buchanan – keyboards (4, 5, 7, 10), rhythm arrangements (10)
- Alan Pasqua – additional keyboards (4, 5)
- Guy Allison – keyboards (6), bass (6), synthesizer drums (6), percussion (6)
- Patrick Leonard – keyboards (9), rhythm arrangements (9)
- David Paich – piano (10), synth strings (10), rhythm and string arrangements (10)
- Dann Huff – guitar (1, 5, 10), guitar solo (1, 4), rhythm arrangements (4, 5, 7), lead guitar (7)
- Michael Landau – guitar (1), guitar solo (8)
- Buzz Feiten – guitar solo (2)
- Paul Jackson Jr. – guitar (3)
- Carlos Rios – guitar (3)
- Steve Lukather – guitar (4), lead guitar (6)
- David Williams – guitar (6, 9), rhythm arrangements (6)
- Freddie Washington – bass (2, 3)
- David Hungate – bass (4)
- Jeff Porcaro – drums (1, 4, 5, 7, 9, 10)
- John Robinson – drums (2, 3, 6)
- Lenny Castro – percussion (1, 4, 9)
- Paulinho da Costa – additional percussion (6, 9)
- Brandon Fields – saxophones (9), horn arrangements (9)
- Gary Grant – trumpet (9), horn arrangements (9)
- Jerry Hey – trumpet (9), horn arrangements (9)
- Marty Paich – string arrangements (10)
- Charlotte Crossley – backing vocals (1, 5)
- David Lasley – backing vocals (1, 5)
- Paulette McWilliams – backing vocals (1, 5)
- Myrna Smith Schilling – backing vocals (1, 5)
- James Ingram – backing vocals (3)
- Phillip Ingram – backing vocals (3, 9)
- Phil Perry – backing vocals (3, 9)
- Siedah Garrett – backing vocals (4, 7, 10)
- Timothy B. Schmit – backing vocals (4)
- Kevin Dorsey – backing vocals (4, 5)
- Carl Carwell – backing vocals (6)
- Jeanette Hanes – backing vocals (6)
- Pam Hutchinson – backing vocals (6)
- Darryl Phinnessee – backing vocals (9)
- Kate Markowitz – backing vocals (10)
- Edie Lehmann – backing vocals (10)

=== Technical ===
- Produced by Bill Schnee (1, 4, 5, 7–10); Stewart Levine (2, 3); Boz Scaggs and David Williams (6)
- Engineered by Bill Schnee (1, 4, 5, 7–10); Darren Klein (2, 3); Dan Garcia and Shep Longsdale (6)
- Assistant engineers – Dan Garcia (1, 4–10) and Julie Last (2, 3)
- Mixed by Steve Thompson and Michael Barbiero (1, 4, 5, 7); Daren Klein (2, 3); Mick Guzauski (6); Bill Schnee (8, 9, 10)
- Mastered by Doug Sax at The Mastering Lab (Hollywood, CA)
- Production assistant – Deborah Klein
- Design – John Casado
- Photography – Annie Leibovitz
- Management – The Front Line Management Company, Inc.

== Charts ==
Chart performance for Other Roads
Chart (1988)	Peak position
Australian Albums (ARIA)	35
Canadian Pop Albums (RPM)	36
Dutch Albums (Album Top 100)	46
New Zealand Albums (RMNZ)	22
Swedish Albums (Sverigetopplistan)	46
US Billboard 200	47
