= Down Two Then Left =

Studio album by Boz Scaggs
- Released: November 1977
- Studio: Hollywood Sound Recorders (Los Angeles)
- Genres: Pop; rock; blue-eyed soul
- Length: 43:02
- Label: Columbia
- Producer: Joe Wissert

Boz Scaggs chronology
| Silk Degrees (1976) | Down Two Then Left (1977) | Middle Man (1980) |

Singles from Down Two Then Left
- 1. "Hard Times" Released: 1977; 2. "Hollywood" Released: 1978

Professional ratings
Review scores
| Source | Rating |
|---|---|
| AllMusic | 3/5 stars |
| Christgau's Record Guide | B |
| The Rolling Stone Album Guide | 2.5/5 stars |
| Variety | (favourable) |

Down Two Then Left is the eighth album by singer Boz Scaggs, released in 1977. It peaked at No. 11 on the Billboard 200. This album is notable for the first appearance of Steve Lukather on a Boz Scaggs album, one of his first recording sessions in general.

== Track listing ==
All tracks are written by Boz Scaggs, with additional writers noted.

Side one
| No. | Title | Writer(s) | Length |
|---|---|---|---|
| 1. | "Still Falling for You" | | 3:54 |
| 2. | "Hard Times" | | 4:30 |
| 3. | "A Clue" | | 3:58 |
| 4. | "Whatcha Gonna Tell Your Man" | Jai Winding | 3:54 |
| 5. | "We're Waiting" | Michael Omartian | 6:24 |

Side two
| No. | Title | Writer(s) | Length |
|---|---|---|---|
| 6. | "Hollywood" | Omartian | 3:10 |
| 7. | "Then She Walked Away" | Omartian | 4:06 |
| 8. | "Gimme the Goods" | Omartian | 4:15 |
| 9. | "1993" | Omartian | 4:05 |
| 10. | "Tomorrow Never Came" | Omartian | 4:41 |
| Total length: | | | 43:02 |

Singles released from the album were "Hard Times"/"We're Waiting" and "Hollywood"/"A Clue". Some copies of the "Hard Times" single bear a credit for this album under the title Still Falling for You.

== Personnel ==
Credits adapted from the album's liner notes.

=== Players ===
- Boz Scaggs – lead vocals, backing vocals (1, 5), guitar solo (2, 4)
- Jeff Porcaro – drums, Syndrum, timbales (8)
- Michael Omartian – keyboards, synthesizers, accordion (1), marimba (1), string and horn arrangements, conductor
- Scott Edwards – bass (2–10)
- Jay Graydon – guitars, guitar solo (7)
- Ray Parker Jr. – guitars

==== Additional musicians ====
- David Hungate – bass (1)
- Bobbye Hall – bongos (1), congas (8)
- Victor Feldman – claves (2), vibraphone (6)
- Steve Lukather – guitar solo (3, 8)
- Jai Winding – acoustic piano (4)
- Alan Estes – congas (4)
- Don Menza – saxophone
- Fred Selden – saxophone, flute
- Ernie Watts – saxophone
- Dana Hughes – trombone
- Chuck Findley – trumpet, flugelhorn solo (5)
- Steve Madaio – trumpet
- Barbara Korn – French horn
- David Duke – French horn
- Sidney Sharp – concertmaster
- Carolyn Willis – backing vocals (1, 4–7)
- Jim Gilstrap – backing vocals (2)
- Zedric Turnbough – backing vocals (2)
- John Lehman – backing vocals (2, 3)
- Roy Galloway – backing vocals (3)
- Venetta Fields – backing vocals (3)
- Phyllis St. James – backing vocals (3, 7)
- Bobby King – backing vocals (4)
- Eldridge King – backing vocals (4)
- Terry Evans – backing vocals (4)
- Myrna Matthews – backing vocals (6, 7)
- Julia Tillman Waters – backing vocals (6)
- James Haas – backing vocals (9)
- Stan Farber – backing vocals (9)

=== Technical ===
- Produced by Joe Wissert
- Engineered by Tom Perry
- Mastered by Mike Reese at The Mastering Lab (Los Angeles, California)
- Photography – Guy Bourdin
- Design – Nancy Donald
- Management – Irv Azoff

== Charts ==
=== Weekly charts ===
| Chart (1977–78) | Peak position |
|---|---|
| Australian Albums (Kent Music Report) | 4 |
| Canada Top Albums/CDs (RPM) | 19 |
| Dutch Albums (Album Top 100) | 19 |
| New Zealand Albums (RMNZ) | 2 |
| UK Albums (Official Charts) | 55 |
| US Billboard 200 | 11 |

=== Year-end charts ===
| Chart (1978) | Position |
|---|---|
| Australian Albums (Kent Music Report) | 13 |
| Canada Top Albums/CDs (RPM) | 100 |
| New Zealand Albums (RMNZ) | 15 |
| US Billboard 200 | 88 |

== Certifications ==
| Region | Certification | Certified units/sales |
|---|---|---|
| Australia (ARIA) | 2× Platinum | 100,000^{^} |
| Canada (Music Canada) | Platinum | 100,000^{^} |
| United States (RIAA) | Platinum | 1,000,000^{^} |
^{^} Shipments figures based on certification alone.
