= Look What You've Done to Me =

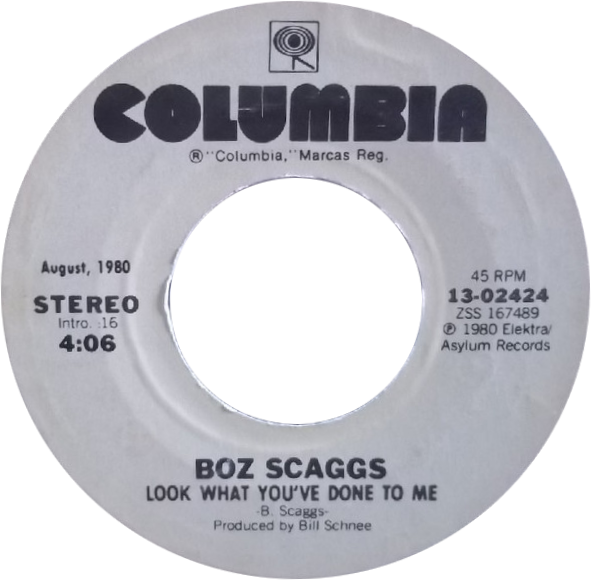
- US reissue A-side label

Single by Boz Scaggs

from the album Urban Cowboy: Original Motion Picture Soundtrack
- B-side: "Simone"
- Released: August 1980
- Genre: Soft rock
- Length: 5:18 (Album); 4:06 (Single)
- Label: Columbia
- Songwriters: Boz Scaggs, David Foster
- Producers: David Foster, Bill Schnee

Boz Scaggs singles chronology
"Jojo" (1980)	"Look What You've Done to Me" (1980)	"Miss Sun" (1980)

Audio
- "Look What You've Done to Me" (album version) by Boz Scaggs on YouTube
- "Look What You've Done to Me" (single version) by Boz Scaggs on YouTube

"Look What You've Done to Me" is a song recorded by Boz Scaggs for the film Urban Cowboy. It was written by Scaggs and David Foster, and produced by Foster and Bill Schnee. The song reached No. 14 on the U.S. Billboard Hot 100 the week of October 25, 1980, No. 13 on the Cash Box Top 100, reached No. 30 in Canada and went to No. 3 on the US Adult Contemporary chart. The song reflects on a broken romance as depicted in the film.

Charlie Puth covered the song at David Foster's 75th Birthday Concert held at The Hollywood Bowl on November 3, 2024.

== Background ==
The song features the Eagles on background vocals and instrumentation by Don Felder on guitar and members of Toto and David Foster on keyboards. Two versions of the song were released. The more widely available version of the song (as released on Scaggs' greatest hits compilations) places more emphasis on the Eagles' background vocals, plus additional background vocal stylings by Scaggs towards the end of the song. The version as heard in the Urban Cowboy film (as well as its soundtrack) replaces the Eagles' vocals with a female chorus.

According to comments made by both Scaggs and Foster on the television special (and subsequent DVD) Hit Man: David Foster and Friends, the song was written and recorded in one night after the studio called asking the duo to write a song for the scene, informing them the scene was to be filmed the following day, and the track needed to be on a courier plane the following morning.

Foster provided a bit more of the backstory on The Real Housewives of Beverly Hills, Season 3, Episode 3, titled "Don't Sing for Your Supper", as his then-wife Yolanda was a cast member. Foster said that Scaggs wasn't happy with any of the music he played that evening until the night was almost over. When Foster played the intro chords that became the trademark beginning of the song, Scaggs said, "That's it."

== Chart performance ==
=== Weekly charts ===
Chart (1980)	Peak position
Canada Top Singles (RPM)	30
Canada Adult Contemporary (RPM)	41
US Billboard Hot 100	14
US Adult Contemporary (Billboard)	3
U.S. Cash Box Top 100	13

=== Year-end charts ===
Chart (1980)	Position
U.S. Billboard Hot 100	102
U.S. Cash Box Top 100	83

== Personnel ==
Original version musicians:

- Boz Scaggs – lead vocals
- David Foster – keyboards, string and horn arrangements
- Don Felder – guitar
- Steve Lukather – guitar
- Mike Porcaro – bass
- Jeff Porcaro – drums
- Glenn Frey – backing vocals
- Don Henley – backing vocals
- Timothy B. Schmit – backing vocals

Urban Cowboy version musicians:

- Boz Scaggs – lead vocals
- David Foster – keyboards, string arrangements
- Steve Lukather – guitar
- Mike Porcaro – bass
- Jeff Porcaro – drums
- Paulette Brown – backing vocals
- Venetta Fields – backing vocals
- Julia Tillman Waters – backing vocals
- Oren Waters – backing vocals
