= Silk Degrees =

Studio album by Boz Scaggs
- Released: February 18, 1976
- Recorded: September – October 1975
- Studios: Davlen Sound Studios (North Hollywood); Hollywood Sound Recorders (Hollywood)
- Genres: Blue-eyed soul; R&B; disco
- Length: 41:32
- Label: Columbia
- Producer: Joe Wissert

Boz Scaggs chronology
Slow Dancer (1974)	Silk Degrees (1976)	Down Two Then Left (1977)

Singles from Silk Degrees
- 1. "It's Over" Released: April 1976; 2. "Lowdown" Released: June 1976; 3. "What Can I Say" Released: June 1976; 4. "Lido Shuffle" Released: March 1977

Silk Degrees is the seventh studio album by American musician Boz Scaggs, released on February 18, 1976, by Columbia Records. The album peaked at No. 2 and spent 115 weeks on the Billboard 200. It has been certified five times platinum by the Recording Industry Association of America (RIAA) and remains Scaggs's best selling album.

Silk Degrees spawned four singles. "It's Over" (No. 38), "Lowdown" (No. 3) and "Lido Shuffle" (No. 11) made the top 40 of the Billboard Hot 100, while "What Can I Say" peaked at No. 42.

== Production ==
The album was recorded at Davlen Sound Studios and Hollywood Sound Recorders in Los Angeles. Among the accompanying musicians, David Paich, Jeff Porcaro, and David Hungate became members of Toto, while Fred Tackett became a member of Little Feat. The album marked Scaggs's commercial zenith, a mix of pop rock ("Jump Street" and "Lido Shuffle"), soul ("What Can I Say" and "Lowdown"), and ballads ("Harbor Lights" and "We're All Alone", which became a hit for Rita Coolidge). Scaggs wrote "Jump Street" 10 minutes before recording it, only having a rough idea of the lyrics. He stated he'd scream out words that "worked phonetically".

== Title and cover art ==
Scaggs recalled that the album's title "was just something I had scribbled on the side of a page. The last thing I do after I record an album is name it. Silk Degrees doesn't mean anything specifically. It's just an image I couldn't get out of my head."

The front cover photograph was by Moshe Brakha of Scaggs at Casino Point, Avalon, California.

== Release and reception ==
Professional ratings
Review scores
Source	Rating
AllMusic	5/5 stars
Christgau's Record Guide	A−
Pitchfork	8.8/10
Rolling Stone	4/5 stars
The Rolling Stone Album Guide	5/5 stars
The Village Voice	B+

"Lowdown" reached the top 5 on the club play, black, disco, and pop charts and also did respectably on the AC chart, with its peak at number 3 on the pop chart. The song is an airplay staple to this day, particularly on AC, oldies, and smooth jazz radio stations. "It's Over", "What Can I Say", and "Lido Shuffle" reached numbers 38, 42 and 11, respectively, on the pop chart. At the Grammy Awards of 1977, "Lowdown" won the Grammy for Best R&B Song. Scaggs also received nominations for Album of the Year, Best LP Package, Best Pop Vocal by a Male, and Best R&B Vocal Performance by a Male for "Lowdown" and Joe Wissert received a nomination for Producer of the Year.

Reviewing for The Village Voice in 1976, Robert Christgau praised the album as "white soul with a sense of humor that isn't consumed in self-parody." The Leader-Post determined that, "occasionally, the melodies and arrangements ... are rather too perfected, and fall into soulful anonymity." Alex Henderson of music database website AllMusic wrote that Scaggs "hit the R&B charts in a big way with the addictive, sly 'Lowdown' [...] and expressed his love of smooth soul music almost as well on the appealing 'What Can I Say'", nonetheless noting that "Scaggs was essentially a pop/rocker, and in that area he has a considerable amount of fun". Henderson found that while the more adult contemporary-leaning ballads are less remarkable, they "have more heart than most of the bland material dominating that format."

On February 27, 2007, Silk Degrees was reissued by Legacy Records with three bonus tracks recorded live at the Greek Theatre on August 15, 1976.

== Track listing ==
Side one
No.	Title	Writer(s)	Length
1.	"What Can I Say"	Boz Scaggs, David Paich	3:01
2.	"Georgia"	Scaggs	3:57
3.	"Jump Street"	Scaggs, Paich	5:14
4.	"What Do You Want the Girl to Do"	Allen Toussaint	3:53
5.	"Harbor Lights"	Scaggs	5:58

Side two
No.	Title	Writer(s)	Length
6.	"Lowdown"	Scaggs, Paich	5:18
7.	"It's Over"	Scaggs, Paich	2:52
8.	"Love Me Tomorrow"	Paich	3:17
9.	"Lido Shuffle"	Scaggs, Paich	3:44
10.	"We're All Alone"	Scaggs	4:14

2007 reissue bonus tracks
No.	Title	Writer(s)	Length
11.	"What Can I Say" (live)	Scaggs, Paich	3:24
12.	"Jump Street" (live)	Scaggs, Paich	5:06
13.	"It's Over" (live)	Scaggs, Paich	3:37

== Personnel ==
=== Musicians ===
- Boz Scaggs – lead vocals, guitars, backing vocals (4, 5, 7, 8)
- David Paich – piano (1–4, 7–10), Hohner clavinet (2), Fender Rhodes (5–8), Minimoog (5, 6, 8, 9), ARP (6), Hammond organ (6, 9), Wurlitzer electric piano (7, 8), harpsichord (7), arrangements
- Jeff Porcaro – drums, percussion (4), timbales (8)
- David Hungate – bass
- Fred Tackett – guitar (1, 2, 8, 9)
- Louis Shelton – guitar (4, 5), slide guitar (8), acoustic guitar (10)

==== Additional musicians ====
- Les Dudek – slide guitar (3)
- Joe Porcaro – percussion (1, 3)
- Jim Horn – tenor saxophone (4)
- Tom Scott – tenor saxophone
- Plas Johnson – tenor saxophone solo (1), tenor saxophone (8)
- Bud Shank – alto saxophone (8)
- Chuck Findley – trumpet, flugelhorn solo (5)
- Paul Hubinon – trumpet
- Dick Hyde – trombone
- Vincent DeRosa – French horn
- Carolyn Willis – backing vocals (1, 6)
- Marty McCall – backing vocals (1, 6)
- Jim Gilstrap – backing vocals (1, 6)
- Augie Johnson – backing vocals (1, 6)
- Maxine Green – backing vocals (4, 7, 8)
- Pepper Swenson – backing vocals (4)

=== Technical ===
- Produced by Joe Wissert
- Engineered by Tom Perry
- Mastered by Doug Sax at The Mastering Lab (Los Angeles, California)
- Photography – Moshe Brakha
- Design – Ron Caro and Nancy Donald

== Charts ==
=== Weekly charts ===
Chart (1976–1978)	Peak position
Australian Albums (Kent Music Report)	1
Canadian Albums (RPM)	2
Dutch Albums (Album Top 100)	15
New Zealand Albums (RMNZ)	3
UK Albums (Official Charts)	20
US Billboard 200	2
US Top R&B/Hip-Hop Albums (Billboard)	6

=== Year-end charts ===
Chart (1976)	Rank
Canadian Albums (RPM)	17
US Billboard Albums	17
Chart (1977)	Rank
Australian Albums (Kent Music Report)	1
Canadian Albums (RPM)	70
New Zealand Albums (RMNZ)	28
US Billboard Albums	8
Chart (1978)	Rank
Australian Albums (Kent Music Report)	20
New Zealand Albums (RMNZ)	17

== Certifications ==
Region	Certification	Certified units/sales
Australia (ARIA)	7× Platinum	350,000^{^}
Canada (Music Canada)	3× Platinum	300,000^{^}
New Zealand (RMNZ)	Platinum	15,000^{^}
United Kingdom (BPI)	Silver	60,000^{^}
United States (RIAA)	5× Platinum	5,000,000^{^}
^{^} Shipments figures based on certification alone.
