= Donald "Duck" Dunn discography =

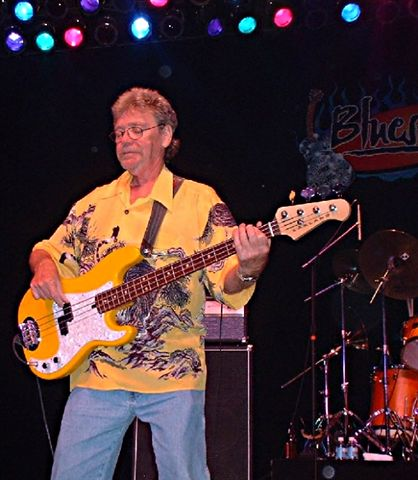
- Studio albums: 137
- Soundtrack albums: 4
- Live albums: 4
- Compilation albums: 57

This article lists the discography of the late American Blues and Soul bassist, Donald "Duck" Dunn. Dunn was an influential bassist notable for his recordings in the 1960s in the house band for Stax Records, Booker T. & the M.G.'s and thereafter as a session bassist.

== with the Mar-Keys ==
- Mar-Keys (Great Memphis Sound, 1966)
- The Mar-Keys/Booker T & The MGs (Back to Back, 1967)

== with Booker T & the MGs ==
- Booker T & The MGs (Soul Dressing, 1965)
- Booker T & The MGs (In the Christmas Spirit, 1966)
- Booker T & The MGs (And Now... Booker T & The MGs, 1966)
- Booker T & The MGs (Hip Hug-Her, 1967)
- Booker T & The MGs (Uptight, 1968)
- Booker T & The MGs (Best of Booker T & The MGs, 1968)
- Booker T & The MGs (Doin' Our Thing, 1968)
- Booker T & The MGs (Soul Limbo, 1968)
- Booker T & The MGs (The Booker T. Set, 1969)
- Booker T & The MGs (Mclemore Avenue, 1970)
- Booker T & The MGs (Melting Pot, 1971)
- MGs (The MGs, 1973)
- Booker T & The MGs (Best of Booker T & The MGs, 1986)
- Booker T & The MGs (Hip Hug-Her, 1992)
- Booker T & The MGs (And Now... Booker T & The MGs, 1992)
- Booker T & The MGs (Doin' Our Thing, 1992)
- Booker T & The MGs (The Very Best of Booker T & The MGs, 1994)
- Booker T & The MGs (That's the Way It Should Be, 1994)
- Booker T & The MGs (Time Is Tight, 1998)
- Booker T & The MGs (Soul Men, 2003)

== with Rance Allen ==
- Rance Allen (A Soulful Experience, 1975)
- Rance Allen (The Best of The Rance Allen Group, 1988)
- Rance Allen (Up Above My Head, 1995)
- Rance Allen (Let the Music Get Down in Your Soul, 1997)
- Rance Allen (The Soulful Truth of The Rance Allen Group, 2001)
- Rance Allen (Stax Profiles, 2005)

== with Duane Allman ==
- Duane Allman (Anthology vol. 2, 1974)

== with Joan Baez ==
- Joan Baez (Gulf Winds, 1976)
- Joan Baez (Blowin' Away, 1977)
- Joan Baez (Complete A&M Recordings, 2003)

== with William Bell ==
- William Bell (Soul of a Bell, 1967)
- William Bell (William Bell, 1974)
- William Bell (Little Something Extra, 1992)
- William Bell (Bound to Happen, 1997)
- William Bell (Soul of a Bell, 2002)

== with The Blues Brothers ==
- Blues Brothers (Briefcase Full of Blues, 1978)
- Blues Brothers (The Blues Brothers, 1980)
- Blues Brothers (Made In America, 1981)
- Blues Brothers (Best of the Blues Brothers, 1982)
- Blues Brothers (Dancin' wid da Blues Brothers, 1985)
- Blues Brothers (Everybody Needs Blues Brothers, 1986)
- Blues Brothers (Live in Montreaux, 1987)
- Blues Brothers (Red White and Blues, 1988)
- Blues Brothers (The Definitive Collection, 1992)
- Blues Brothers (Blues Brothers & Friends: Live from Chicago's House of Blues, 1997)
- Blues Brothers (Blues Brothers 2000, 1999)
- Blues Brothers (The Blues Brothers Complete, 2000)

== with Shirley Brown ==
- Shirley Brown (Woman to Woman, 1974)
- Shirley Brown (Shirley Brown, 1977)

== with Roy Buchanan ==
- Roy Buchanan (Loading Zone, 1977)
- Roy Buchanan (Sweet Dreams: The Anthology, 1992)
- Roy Buchanan (Guitar on Fire, 1993)

== with Jimmy Buffett ==
- Jimmy Buffett (Hot Water, 1988)

== with Ray Charles ==
- Ray Charles (Genius & Soul: The 50th Anniversary Collection, 1997)

== with Keith Christmas ==
- Keith Christmas (Stories from the Human Zoo, 1976)

== with Eric Clapton ==
- Eric Clapton (Money and Cigarettes, 1983)
- Eric Clapton (Behind the Sun, 1985)
- Eric Clapton (Crossroads, 1988)
- Eric Clapton (Clapton Chronicles: Best of 1981-1999, 1999)
- Eric Clapton (Money & Cigarettes, 2000)
- Eric Clapton (Best Of Eric Clapton [Import Bonus Tracks], 2000)
- Eric Clapton (Unplugged/Clapton Chronicles, 2001)

== with Doug Clifford ==
- Doug Clifford (Cosmo, 1972)

== with Rita Coolidge ==
- Rita Coolidge (Rita Coolidge, 1971)

== with Don Covay ==
- Don Covay (Mercy, Mercy/Seesaw, 2000)

== with Crosby Stills Nash & Young ==
- Crosby Stills Nash & Young (Looking Forward, 1999)

== with Steve Cropper ==
- Steve Cropper (Playing my Thang, 1980)

== with Delaney & Bonnie ==
- Delaney & Bonnie (Home, 1969)

== with Bob Dylan ==
- Bob Dylan (Shot of Love, 1981)
- Bob Dylan (Bob Dylan 30th Anniversary Concert, 1993)

== with Jesse Ed Davis ==
- Jesse Ed Davis (Ululu, 1972)

== with Willie Dixon ==
- Willie Dixon (The Chess Box, 1990)

== with Tinsley Ellis ==
- Tinsley Ellis (Fire It Up, 1997)

== with The Emotions ==
- The Emotions (Sunshine, 1978)
- The Emotions (So I Can Love You, 1970)

== with Yvonne Elliman ==
- Yvonne Elliman (Best Of Yvonne Elliman, 1997)

== with Eddie Floyd ==
- Eddie Floyd (Knock on Wood, 1967)
- Eddie Floyd (Rare Stamps, 1969)
- Eddie Floyd (Soul Street, 1974)

== with Peter Frampton ==
- Peter Frampton (Where I Should Be, 1979)

== with John Fogerty ==
- John Fogerty (Blue Moon Swamp, 1997)
- John Fogerty (Blue Moon Swamp, 2004)

== with Carol Grimes ==
- Carol Grimes (Carol Grimes, 1976)

== with Isaac Hayes ==
- Isaac Hayes (Presenting Isaac Hayes, 1967)

== with Ronnie Hawkins ==
- Ronnie Hawkins (The Hawk, 1971)

== with Ruby Johnson ==
- Ruby Johnson (I'll Run Your Heart Away, 1993)

== with Albert King ==
- Albert King (Born Under a Bad Sign, 1967)
- Albert King (Years Gone By, 1969)
- Albert King (King of the Blues Guitar, 1969)
- Albert King (Blues for Elvis - King Does the King's Things, 1970)
- Albert King (Lovejoy, 1971)
- Albert King (The Pinch or The Blues Don't Change, 1977)
- Albert King (Best of Albert King Vol 1, 1986)
- Albert King (The Best of Albert King, Vol 1, 1991)
- Albert King (The Ultimate Collection, 1993)
- Albert King (The Blues Don't Change, 1996)
- Albert King (The Very Best of Albert King, 1999)
- Albert King (Born Under a Bad Sign, 2002)

== with Freddie King ==
- Freddie King (Getting Ready, 1971)
- Freddie King (Texas Cannonball, 1972)
- Freddy King (Hide Away: The Best of Freddy King)
- Freddie King (Getting Ready, 1996)
- Freddie King (Ultimate Collection, 2001)
- Freddie King (Texas Cannonball, 2002)

== with Richie Havens ==
- Richie Havens (End of the Beginning, 1976)
- Richie Havens (Dreaming As One: The A&M Years, 2004)

== with Levon Helm ==
- Levon Helm (Levon Helm & The RCO All Stars, 1977)
- Levon Helm (Levon Helm & The RCO All-Stars, 1996)

== with Herbie Mann ==
- Herbie Mann (Push Push, 1971)

== with Chris Hillman ==
- Chris Hillman (Slippin' Away, 1976)

== with Jerry Lee Lewis ==
- Jerry Lee Lewis (All Killer, No Filler: The Anthology, 1993)
- Jerry Lee Lewis (Mercury Smashes... and Rockin' Sessions, 2000)
- Jerry Lee Lewis (Southern Roots: Boogie Woogie Country Man, 2004)

== with The Manhattan Transfer ==
- The Manhattan Transfer (Pastiche, 1976)
- The Manhattan Transfer (Pastiche, 1978)
- The Manhattan Transfer (Pastiche, 1994)

== with Mel & Tim ==
- Mel & Tim (Starting All Over Again, 1972)

== with Stevie Nicks ==
- Stevie Nicks (Bella Donna, 1981)
- Stevie Nicks (Timespace: The Best of Stevie Nicks, 1991)
- Stevie Nicks (Enchanted: The Works of Stevie Nicks, 1998)

== with Don Nix ==
- Don Nix (Living by the Days, 1971)

== with Tom Petty & The Heartbreakers ==
- Tom Petty & The Heartbreakers (Damn the Torpedoes, 1979)
- Tom Petty & The Heartbreakers (Hard Promises, 1981)
- Tom Petty & The Heartbreakers (Playback, 1995)
- Tom Petty & The Heartbreakers (Anthology: Through the Years, 2000)

== with Wilson Pickett ==
- Wilson Pickett (In the Midnight Hour, 1965)
- Wilson Pickett (The Exciting Wilson Pickett, 1966)
- Wilson Pickett (Wilson Pickett's Greatest Hits, 1985)
- Wilson Pickett (A Man and a Half: The Best of Wilson Pickett, 1992)
- Wilson Pickett (In the Midnight Hour, 1993)

== with David Porter ==
- David Porter (Victim of the Joke?: An Opera, 1971)
- David Porter (Victim of the Joke?, 1995)

== with Elvis Presley ==
- Elvis Presley (Raised On Rock/For Ol' Times Sake, 1973)

== with John Prine ==
- John Prine (Common Sense, 1975)
- John Prine (Prime Prine, 1976)
- John Prine (Great Days: The John Prine Anthology, 1993)

== with Otis Redding ==
- Otis Redding (Pain In My Heart, 1964)
- Otis Redding (The Great Otis Redding Sings Soul Ballads, 1965)
- Otis Redding (Otis Blue/Otis Redding Sings Soul, 1966)
- Otis Redding (The Soul Album, 1966)
- Otis Redding (Live in Europe, 1967)
- Otis Redding & Carla Thomas (King & Queen, 1967)
- Otis Redding (Dock of the Bay, 1968)
- Otis Redding (The Immortal Otis Redding, 1968)
- Otis Redding (Love Man, 1969)
- Otis Redding (Tell the Truth, 1970)
- Otis Redding (Otis! The Definitive Otis Redding, 1993)
- Otis Redding (Otis Redding Sings Soul, 1993)
- Otis Redding (Dreams to Remember: The Otis Redding Anthology, 1998)

== with Bruce Roberts ==
- Bruce Roberts (Bruce Roberts, 1978)

== with Leon Russell ==
- Leon Russell (Will o' The Wisp, 1975)
- Leon Russell (Best Of Leon Russell, 1976)
- Leon Russell (Retrospective, 1997)

== with Mitch Ryder ==
- Mitch Ryder (The Detroit Memphis Experiment, 1969)

== with Sam & Dave ==
- Sam & Dave (Back at 'Cha!, 1976)
- Sam & Dave (The Very Best Of Same & Dave, 1995)

== with Leo Sayer ==
- Leo Sayer (Here, 1979)
- Leo Sayer (Here, 2003)

== with Boz Scaggs ==
- Boz Scaggs (My Time: The Anthology 1969–1997, 1997)

== with Mavis Staples ==
- Mavis Staples (Mavis Staples, 1969)
- Mavis Staples (Only for the Lonely, 1970)

== with The Staples Singers ==
- The Staples Singers (Soul Folk in Action, 1968)
- The Staple Singers (This Time Around, 1981)

== with Rod Stewart ==
- Rod Stewart (Atlantic Crossing, 1975)
- Rod Stewart (A Night on the Town, 1976)

== with The Soul Children ==
- The Soul Children (Soul Children/Best Of Two Worlds, 1995)
- The Soul Children (Genesis/Friction, 1999)

== with Billy Swan ==
- Billy Swan (You're OK, I'm OK, 1978)

== with Tavares ==
- Tavares (Best of Tavares, 1996)

== with Johnnie Taylor ==
- Johnnie Taylor (Who's Making Love, 1968)
- Johnnie Taylor (The Johnnie Taylor Philosophy Continues, 1969)
- Johnnie Taylor (Who's Making Love, 1991)
- Johnnie Taylor (Lifetime, 2000)

== with Carla Thomas ==
- Carla Thomas (Hidden Gems, 1991)
- Carla Thomas (Gee Whiz: The Best Of Carla Thomas, 1994)
- Carla Thomas (Love Means Carla Thomas/Memphis Queen, 1997)

== with Mickey Thomas ==
- Mickey Thomas (As Long As You Love Me, 1976)
- Mickey Thomas (As long as you love me, 1977)

== with Rufus Thomas ==
- Rufus Thomas (Can't Get Away From This Dog, 1992)

== with Muddy Waters ==
- Muddy Waters (Fathers and Sons, 1969)
- Muddy Waters (Muddy & The Wolf, 1974)
- Muddy Waters (Chess Box, 1990)
- Muddy Waters (Goodbye Newport Blues, 1995)

== with Tony Joe White ==
- Tony Joe White (Lake Placid Blues, 1995)

== with Bill Withers ==
- Bill Withers (Just as I Am, 1971)
- Bill Withers (The Best Of Bill Withers, 1994)
- Bill Withers (Lean on Me: The Best of Bill Withers, 2000)

== with Neil Young ==
- Neil Young (Silver & Gold, 2000)
- Neil Young (Road Rock Vol 1: Friends & Relatives, 2000)
- Neil Young (Are You Passionate?, 2002)

== Various artist compilations ==
- Guitar Showdown at the Dusk 'Til Dawn Blues Festival, 1966
- Various Artists (Monterrey International Pop Festival, 1967)
- Various Artists (Soul Christmas, 1968)
- Various Artists (Atlantic Blues, 1986)
- Soundtrack (The Great Outdoors, 1988)
- Soundtrack (Roadhouse, 1989)
- Legends Of Guitar (Electric Blues Vol.1, 1990)
- Various Artists (Atlantic Rhythm & Blues 1947-1974, 1991)
- Various Artists (Blues Masters Vol 1: Urban Blues, 1992)
- Various Artists (Stax/Volt Review, Vol 3: Live In Europe - Hit The Road Stax, 1992)
- Blues Masters Sampler (1993)
- Various Artists (The Complete Stax-Volt Soul Singles Vol 2: 1968-1971, 1993)
- The Original Soul Christmas (1994)
- Various Artists (Texas Music, Vol 1: Postwar Blues Combos, 1994)
- Various Artists (Blues Masters Vol 1-5, 1995)
- Various Artists (Jingle Bell Jam: Jazz Christmas Classics, 1995)
- Various Artists (Original Soul Christmas, 1995)
- Various Artists (Mean Old World: The Blues from 1940 to 1994, 1996)
- Soundtrack (Vampires, 1998)
- Soundtrack (Martin Scorsese Presents the Blues: A Musical Journey, 2003)
- Various Artists (Soul Comes Home: Celebration of Stax Records, 2004)
