= Soul Finger (Bar-Kays album) =

Studio album by The Bar-Kays
- Released: July 10, 1967
- Recorded: June 23, 1967
- Genre: Funk; soul
- Length: 29.29
- Label: Volt; Atco
- Producer: Jim Stewart

The Bar-Kays chronology
Soul Finger (1967)	Gotta Groove (1969)

Singles from Soul Finger
- 1. "Soul Finger" Released: April 14, 1967

Soul Finger is the debut album of the Bar-Kays, issued three months after the single of the same name. It was recorded by Tom Dowd and Chris Huston on Friday, June 23, 1967, at the Stax studio in Memphis. Though all but one member of the group were black (Ronnie Caldwell being the only white member), the album cover art, by Loring Eutemey, suggests an interracial pop music party feeling. The instrumental band, after being signed in early 1967, was tutored by Al Jackson, Jr. and the other members of Booker T. & the M.G.'s, which shows in the tightness of the rhythm section. That summer they also were selected by Otis Redding as his new backup band.

== Trivia ==
The cover shows an early example of a T-shirt displaying a logo. The artwork was credited to Loring Eutemey.

== Track listing ==
=== Side one ===
1. "Soul Finger" (Jimmy King, Phalon Jones, Carl Cunningham, Ben Cauley, Ronnie Caldwell, James Alexander) – 2:18
2. "Knucklehead" (Steve Cropper, Booker T. Jones) – 2:25
3. "With a Child's Heart" (Vicky Basemore, Sylvia Moy, Henry Cosby) – 2:56
4. "Bar-Kay's Boogaloo" (Jimmy King, Phalon Jones, Carl Cunningham, Ben Cauley, Ronnie Caldwell, James Alexander) – 2:16
5. "Theme from Hell's Angels" (composer unknown) – 2:46

=== Side two ===
1. "You Can't Sit Down" (Dee Clark, Kal Mann, Cornell Muldrow) – 3:05
2. "House Shoes" (Jimmy King, Phalon Jones, Carl Cunningham, Ben Cauley, Ronnie Caldwell, James Alexander) – 2:45
3. "Pearl High" (Al Jackson, Jr., Isaac Hayes) – 2:32
4. "I Want Someone" (Estelle Axton, Deanie Parker) – 3:08
5. "Hole in the Wall" (Nathaniel Nathan, Steve Cropper, Al Jackson, Jr., Booker T. Jones) – 2:31
6. "Don't Do That" (Jimmy King, Phalon Jones, Carl Cunningham, Ben Cauley, Ronnie Caldwell, James Alexander) – 2:47

== Personnel ==
- James Alexander - bass
- Jimmy King - guitar
- Ronnie Caldwell - organ
- Carl Cunningham - drums
- Phalon Jones - saxophone
- Ben Cauley - trumpet
- Jim Stewart - supervision
- Carl Sims - vocalist
