= Soul Finger =

Single by the Bar-Kays

from the album Soul Finger
- B-side: "Knucklehead"
- Released: April 14, 1967
- Recorded: March 31, 1967
- Length: 2:18
- Label: Volt Records
- Songwriters: Jimmy King; Phalon Jones; Carl Cunningham; Ben Cauley; Ronnie Caldwell; James Alexander

The Bar-Kays singles chronology
"Soul Finger" (1967)	"Knucklehead" (1967)

Official audio
- "Soul Finger" (2006 Remaster) on YouTube

"Soul Finger" is the first single released by R&B group the Bar-Kays. It was issued by Stax Records on the Volt Records label on April 14, 1967.

== Background ==
The song was written by the Bar-Kays while they were rehearsing with Norman West to perform a cover of J. J. Jackson's "But It's Alright". It begins with the melody of the popular children's song "Mary Had a Little Lamb" and then cuts into the main riff, punctuated with a high trumpet trill. It features a chorus of neighborhood children who had been loitering outside the recording studio; they were instructed to shout "Soul Finger!" and were paid with Coca-Cola. The idea for the title and the shouts came from the Stax songwriters Isaac Hayes and David Porter. The track was used as the opening theme tune to BBC Radio 1 DJ Stuart Henry's shows from 1969 to 1974.

== Chart performance ==
"Soul Finger" was a hit in the United States, peaking at number 3 on the U.S. Billboard R&B singles chart and number 17 on the Billboard Hot 100. The B-side of the single was "Knucklehead", written by Booker T. Jones and Steve Cropper, which reached number 28 on the R&B singles chart and number 76 on the Hot 100. "Soul Finger" and "Knucklehead" were the first two tracks of the Bar-Kays' first LP, Soul Finger, issued on July 10, after nine more tracks had been recorded on June 23.

== Charts ==
=== Weekly charts ===
Chart (1967)	Peak position
UK Singles (Official Charts)	33
US Billboard Hot 100	17
US Hot Rhythm & Blues Singles (Billboard)	3

== Certifications ==
Region	Certification	Certified units/sales
United States (RIAA)	Gold	500,000^{^}
^{^} Shipments figures based on certification alone.
