= Back to Back (The Mar-Keys and Booker T. & the M.G.'s album) =

Live album by the Mar-Keys and Booker T. & the M.G.'s
- Released: July 1967
- Recorded: 1967
- Venue: Olympia Theatre, Paris, France
- Genre: Southern soul, instrumental rock
- Length: 36:54
- Label: Stax/Atlantic
- Producer: Jim Stewart

The Mar-Keys chronology
The Great Memphis Sound (1966)	Back to Back (1967)	Damifiknow! (1969)

Booker T. & the M.G.'s chronology
Hip Hug-Her (1967)	Back to Back (1967)	Doin' Our Thing (1968)

Professional ratings
Review scores
Source	Rating
Allmusic	4/5 stars

Back to Back is a live album by the Mar-Keys and Booker T & the M.G.'s, released on Stax Records in 1967. It features both groups playing live on the Stax/Volt package tour of Europe. The album peaked at number 98 on the Billboard 200 album chart in the United States.

== Track listing ==
"Philly Dog", "Grab This Thing", and "Last Night" are performed by the Mar-Keys (i.e., Booker T. & the M.G.'s plus the horn section of Wayne Jackson, Joe Arnold and Andrew Love). All other songs are performed by Booker T. & the MG's alone.

Side one

1. "Green Onions" (Steve Cropper, Booker T. Jones, Lewis Steinberg, Al Jackson Jr.) – 4:55
2. "Red Beans and Rice" (Cropper, Jones, Donald "Duck" Dunn, Jackson) – 1:55
3. "Tic-Tac-Toe" (Cropper, Jones, Dunn, Jackson) – 2:35
4. "Hip Hug-Her" (Cropper, Jones, Dunn, Jackson) – 2:51
5. "Philly Dog" (Rufus Thomas) – 3:14

Side two

1. "Grab This Thing" (Cropper) – 2:55
2. "Last Night" (Charles "Packy" Axton, Gilbert Caple, Chips Moman, Floyd Newman, Jerry Lee "Smoochy" Smith) – 3:18
3. "Gimme Some Lovin'" (Steve Winwood, Muff Winwood, Spencer Davis) – 2:56
4. "Booker-Loo" (Cropper, Jones, Dunn, Jackson) – 3:18
5. "Outrage" (Cropper, Steinberg, Jackson) – 2:40

== Personnel ==
Booker T. & the M.G.s

- Booker T. Jones – organ
- Steve Cropper – guitar
- Donald Dunn – bass guitar
- Al Jackson Jr. – drums

The Mar-Keys – Booker T. & the M.G.'s augmented by

- Wayne Jackson – trumpet
- Joe Arnold – alto saxophone
- Andrew Love – tenor saxophone
