= Coldblooded (album) =

Studio album by The Bar-Kays
- Released: 1974
- Recorded: 1974
- Genre: Funk
- Label: Volt Records
- Producer: Allen Jones

The Bar-Kays chronology
Do You See What I See? (1972)	Coldblooded (1974)	Too Hot To Stop (1976)

Professional ratings
Review scores
Source	Rating
Allmusic	3/5 stars

Coldblooded is an album by the Memphis, Tennessee-based funk band The Bar-Kays. Released in 1974, it was their last album for Volt Records before moving on to Mercury Records in 1976. This album did not chart.

== Track listing ==
1. "Coldblooded" (James Alexander, Lester Snell, Lloyd Smith, Willie Hall, Winston Stewart) – 5:49
2. "Harmony" (Joe Shamwell) – 3:36
3. "In the Scheme of Things" (Charles Allen, Lloyd Smith) – 4:21
4. "Waiting and Hating" (Allen Jones, Harvey Henderson) – 3:57
5. "Smiling, Styling and Profiling" (Joe Shamwell) – 3:19
6. "Frame of Mind" (Allen Jones, Larry Dodson) – 4:37
7. "I've Got to Use My Imagination" (Barry Goldberg, Gerry Goffin) – 4:20
8. "Fightin' Fire with Fire" (Allen Jones, Lester Snell, Willie Brown) – 4:24
9. "Would I If I Could" (Allen Jones, Harvey Henderson, Larry Dodson) – 3:37
10. "Be Yourself" (Allen Jones, Harvey Henderson) – 3:32

== Personnel ==
- Larry Dodson - lead vocals
- Hot Buttered Soul (Diane Lewis, Pat Lewis, Rose Williams) - backing vocals
- Harvey Henderson - tenor saxophone, flute
- Charles Allen - trumpet, backing vocals
- Lloyd Smith - lead and 12-string guitars
- Winston Stewart - keyboards, organ, vibraphone
- James Alexander - bass, backing vocals
- Willie Hall - drums
