= The Packers =

American soul musical group

The Packers were an American soul group formed by tenor saxophonist Charles "Packy" Axton, who was the son of Stax Records part-owner Estelle Axton. Axton was a former member of The Mar-Keys, as was Steve Cropper, who played on the group's first recording and hit, ostensibly recorded as a 'demo'. Cropper, a member of Booker T. Jones & The MGs and the Stax Records' session band, was also joined by Booker T. on piano and drummer Al Jackson for the recording, while Leon Haywood (on organ) was among those who also played on the group's records.

The Packers' first album, Hole in the Wall, reached #7 on the Billboard R&B Albums chart on the strength of the titular single, which reached #5 on the R&B Singles chart and #43 on the Billboard Hot 100. The short-lived Pure Soul label was specifically set up by Los Angeles disc-jockey, Magnificent Montague, who had arranged the recording session.

== Discography ==
- Hole in the Wall (Pure Soul, 1966)
- Hitch It Up (Imperial Records, 1968)
