= Green onion (disambiguation) =

Green onion or scallion refers to various edible members of the genus Allium that lack a fully developed bulb.

Green onion may also refer to:

- Green Onions (album), a 1962 album by Booker T. & the M.G.s
  - "Green Onions", a hit 1962 soul instrumental by Booker T. & the M.G.s on the album listed above
