= Too Hot to Stop =

Studio album by the Bar-Kays
- Released: October 1976
- Recorded: 1976
- Genre: Funk
- Length: 35:58
- Labels: Mercury; SRM-1-1099
- Producer: Allen Jones

The Bar-Kays chronology
Coldblooded (1974)	Too Hot to Stop (1976)	Flying High on Your Love (1977)

Too Hot to Stop is a 1976 album by the American funk group the Bar-Kays. It was their first album for Mercury Records. It includes the hit "Shake Your Rump to the Funk".

== Critical reception ==
Professional ratings
Review scores
Source	Rating
AllMusic	4/5 stars
The Encyclopedia of Popular Music	2/5 stars
The New Rolling Stone Record Guide	2/5 stars

The New Rolling Stone Record Guide deemed the album "unashamedly derivative Ohio Players funk".

== Track listing ==
1. "Too Hot to Stop, Pt. 1" (Fred Freeman, Harry Nehls III, Larry Dodson, James Alexander, Michael Beard, Winston Stewart, Lloyd Smith, Charles Allen, Harvey Henderson, Frank Thompson) – 6:31
2. "Cozy" (James Banks, Henderson Thigpen) – 3:36
3. "Bang, Bang (Stick 'Em Up)" (Dodson, Alexander, Beard, Stewart, Smith, Allen, Henderson, Thompson) – 3:48
4. "Spellbound" (Banks, Thigpen) – 5:05
5. "Shake Your Rump to the Funk" (Dodson, Alexander, Beard, Stewart, Smith, Allen, Henderson, Thompson) – 3:52
6. "You're So Sexy" (Dodson, Alexander, Beard, Stewart, Smith, Allen, Henderson, Thompson) – 3:53
7. "Summer of Our Love" (Dodson, Alexander, Beard, Stewart, Smith, Allen, Henderson, Thompson) – 4:25
8. "Whitehouseorgy" (Howard Redmond, L. Hendricks, R. CoCo, P. Kibbie) – 4:48
