= Light of Life (The Bar-Kays album) =

Studio album by the Bar-Kays
- Released: December 1978
- Recorded: 1978
- Studios: Ardent, Memphis, Tennessee
- Genres: Funk; disco
- Length: 30:53
- Label: Mercury
- Producer: Allen Jones

The Bar-Kays chronology
Money Talks (1978)	Light of Life (1978)	Injoy (1979)

Light of Life is an album by the Memphis, Tennessee, funk band the Bar-Kays.

== Reception ==
Professional ratings
Review scores
Source	Rating
AllMusic	3/5 stars
The Encyclopedia of Popular Music	2/5 stars

Released on Mercury Records in December 1978, the album would chart at number fifteen on the Billboard Soul Album charts.

== Track listing ==
All tracks composed by Allen Jones, Charles Allen, Frank Thompson, Harvey Henderson, James Alexander, Lloyd Smith, Michael Beard, Winson Stewart; except where indicated.

1. "Get Up 'n Do It" – 3:39
2. "Shine" – 3:41
3. "I Lean on You (You Lean on Me)" – 3:12
4. "Give It Up" – 4:30
5. "Love's What It's All About" – 3:03
6. "I'll Dance" – 3:38
7. "We're the Happiest People in the World" (Lewis Collins, Michael Toles) – 3:16
8. "Are You Being Real" – 2:59
9. "Angel Eyes" – 2:55

== Charts ==
Chart (1979)	Peak position
U.S. Billboard 200	86
Billboard US Soul	15

=== Singles ===
Year	Single	Chart positions
Year	Single	US R&B
1979	"Are You Being Real"	61
1979	"I'll Dance"	26
1979	"Shine"	14
