= Boogie Body Land =

Single by The Bar-Kays

from the album As One
- Released: 1980
- Length: 5:51 (12" version); 4:11 (single version)
- Label: Mercury
- Songwriter(s): Allen Jones; Charles Allen; Frank Thompson; Harvey Henderson; James Alexander; Larry Dodson; Lloyd Smith; Mark Bynum; Michael Beard; Sherman Guy; Winston Stewart
- Producer(s): Allen Jones

The Bar-Kays singles chronology
"Today Is the Day" (1979)	"Boogie Body Land" (1980)	"Body Fever" (1980)

"Boogie Body Land" is a song written by the band members of the Bar-Kays. It was released in 1980 by Mercury Records. "Boogie Body Land" was included on their 1980 album As One, which was produced by Allen Jones. As a single it peaked at number 7 on the Billboard Black Singles and number 73 on the Dance chart. Its lowest position was 74 on the latter.

== Track listing ==
=== 1980 releases ===
7" vinyl

- US: Mercury / 45-76088

Side one
No.	Title	Length
1.	"Boogie Body Land"	4:11

Side two
No.	Title	Length
1.	"Running In and Out of My Life"	4:44

== Personnel ==
- Performer: Bar-Kays
- Songwriters: Allen Jones, Charles Allen, Frank Thompson, Harvey Henderson, James Alexander, Larry Dodson, Lloyd Smith, Mark Bynum, Michael Beard, Sherman Guy, Winston Stewart

== Chart performance ==
Chart (December 1980)	Peak position
US Billboard Black Singles	#7
US Billboard Hot Dance Music/Club Play	#73
