= I'll Play the Blues for You =

Studio album by Albert King
- Released: 1972
- Recorded: 1972 in Memphis, Tennessee
- Genre: Soul blues, blues
- Length: 39:44
- Label: Stax
- Producer: Allen Jones, Henry Bush

Albert King chronology
| Lovejoy (1971) | I'll Play the Blues for You (1972) | Blues at Sunset (1973) |

Singles from I'll Play the Blues for You
- 1. "Breaking Up Somebody's Home" Released: October 1972

Professional ratings
Review scores
| Source | Rating |
|---|---|
| AllMusic | 4/5 stars |
| The Penguin Guide to Blues Recordings | 4/4 stars |

I'll Play the Blues for You is the seventh studio album by American blues guitarist Albert King released in 1972.

In 2017, the single version of the title track was inducted in to the Blues Hall of Fame.

An SACD version was released in 2004 and a remastered version was released digitally in June 2026.

== Track listing ==
1. "I'll Play the Blues for You, Pts. 1-2" (Jerry Beach) – 7:20
2. "Little Brother (Make a Way)" (Henry Bush, Marshall Jones, Carl Smith) – 2:49
3. "Breaking up Somebody's Home" (Al Jackson Jr., Timothy Matthews) – 7:19
4. "High Cost of Loving" (Sherwin Hamlett, Allen A. Jones) – 2:56
5. "I'll Be Doggone" (Pete Moore, Smokey Robinson, Marvin Tarplin) – 5:41
6. "Answer to the Laundromat Blues" (Albert King) – 4:37
7. "Don't Burn Down the Bridge ('Cause You Might Wanna Come Back Across)" (Allen A. Jones, Carl Wells) – 5:07
8. "Angel of Mercy" (Homer Banks, Raymond Jackson) – 4:20

Bonus tracks 'Stax Remasters 2012' (previously unreleased)

9. "I'll Play the Blues for You" (alternate version) – 8:44
10. "Don't Burn Down the Bridge ('Cause You Might Want To Come Back Across)" (alternate version) – 5:13
11. "I Need a Love" – 4:29
12. "Albert's Stomp" – 2:18

== Personnel ==
- Albert King – electric guitar, vocals
- The Memphis Horns – horns
- The Bar-Kays and The Movement – rhythm section
- Allen Jones – arrangements, producer
- Henry Bush – arrangements, engineer, producer
- Bernard Nagler – photography
