= Flying High on Your Love =

Studio album by Bar-Kays
- Released: November 1977
- Recorded: 1977
- Studio: Ardent, Memphis, Tennessee
- Genre: Funk; disco
- Length: 36:26
- Label: Mercury
- Producer: Allen Jones

Bar-Kays chronology
Too Hot To Stop (1976)	Flying High on Your Love (1977)	Money Talks (1978)

Flying High on Your Love is an album by the Memphis, Tennessee-based funk band the Bar-Kays.

== Critical reception ==
Professional ratings
Review scores
Source	Rating
AllMusic	4/5 stars
The Rolling Stone Record Guide	2/5 stars

Released on Mercury Records in the fall of 1977, the album charted at number seven on the Billboard Soul Album charts. It was the first album by the band to be certified Gold by the Recording Industry Association of America for sales of over 500,000 copies in the United States. Considered by many fans to be the Bar-Kays' best album overall, if featured two hit singles, "Let's Have Some Fun" and "Attitudes", as well as popular track "You Can't Run Away," which received significant radio play. The album opener "Shut the Funk Up", and its closing title track "Flying High on Your Love" were equally popular. The album's success, along with their previous album, and acclaimed concert performances on tour with Parliament-Funkadelic, established the Bar-Kays as one of the key bands of the funk genre in the late 1970s.

== Track listing ==
- All songs written by the Bar-Kays.
1. "Shut the Funk Up" – 4:20
2. "Standing on the Outside" – 4:18
3. "Woman of the Night" – 3:50
4. "Whatever It Is" – 2:10
5. "Can't Keep My Hands Off You" – 3:20
6. "Let's Have Some Fun" – 6:05
7. "Attitudes" – 3:44
8. "You Can't Run Away" – 4:50
9. "Flying High on Your Love" – 3:50

== Charts ==
Chart (1978)	Peak position
U.S. Billboard 200	47
Billboard US Soul	7

=== Singles ===
Year	Single	Chart positions
Year	Single	US R&B
1978	"Attitudes"	22
1978	"Let's Have Some Fun"	11

== Certifications ==
Region	Certification	Certified units/sales
United States (RIAA)	Gold	500,000^{^}
^{^} Shipments figures based on certification alone.

== Samples ==
Eazy-E sampled "Let's Have Some Fun" on his song "No More ?'s" on his debut album Eazy-Duz-It in 1988.
