= Dangerous (The Bar-Kays album) =

Studio album by Bar-Kays
- Released: 1984
- Recorded: 1983–1984
- Studio: Ardent, Memphis, Tennessee
- Label: Mercury
- Producer: Allen Jones

Bar-Kays chronology
Propositions (1982)	Dangerous (1984)	Banging the Wall (1985)

Professional ratings
Review scores
Source	Rating
AllMusic	3/5 stars

Dangerous is an album by the Memphis, Tennessee, band the Bar-Kays, released on Mercury Records in April 1984. The album reached number seven on the Billboard R&B albums chart. The song "Freakshow on the Dance Floor" hit number 2 on Billboard's Black Singles Chart, and was featured in the film Breakin' and appeared on its soundtrack album.

== Track listing ==
All tracks composed by Allen Jones and Bar-Kays.

1. "Dangerous" – 5:26
2. "Dirty Dancer" – 4:35
3. "Make Believe Lover" – 5:13
4. "Dance, Party, Etc." – 5:20
5. "Freakshow on the Dance Floor" – 6:36
6. "Lovers Should Never Fall in Love" – 3:53
7. "Loose Talk" – 4:20
8. "Sexomatic" – 5:21

== Charts ==
Chart (1984)	Peak position
Billboard Top Pop Albums	52
Billboard Top Black Albums	7

=== Singles ===
Year	Single	Chart positions	
Year	Single	US Hot 100	US R&B
1984	"Freakshow on the Dancefloor"	73	2
1984	"Sexomatic"	-	12
1984	"Dirty Dancer"	-	17
