= Injoy =

Studio album by the Bar-Kays
- Released: October 1979
- Recorded: 1979
- Studio: Ardent (Memphis, Tennessee)
- Genre: Funk; disco
- Length: 37:11
- Label: Mercury
- Producer: Allen Jones

The Bar-Kays chronology
Light of Life (1978)	Injoy (1979)	As One (1980)

Injoy is an album by the Memphis, Tennessee-based funk band the Bar-Kays.

== Critical reception ==
Professional ratings
Review scores
Source	Rating
AllMusic	4/5 stars
The Virgin Encyclopedia of R&B and Soul	2/5 stars

Released on Mercury Records in October 1979, this album reached number two on the Billboard Soul Album chart. It was the band's biggest selling album, and their second to be certified Gold for sales of over 500,000 copies. The album’s first single, "Move Your Boogie Body", was a Top 3 hit on the Billboard R&B singles chart. The album’s third track, "Running In and Out of My Life", also received substantial airplay and was a hit on R&B radio stations. It is one of the few Bar-Kays songs where the lead vocal is not performed by Larry Dodson. Mark Bynum performed the lead vocal with Dodson adding backgrounds.

== Track listing ==
No.	Title	Length
1.	"More and More"	4:27
2.	"Move Your Boogie Body"	6:17
3.	"Running In and Out of My Life"	4:44
4.	"Girl I'm on Your Side"	3:59
5.	"Loving You Is My Occupation"	4:59
6.	"Today Is the Day"	3:11
7.	"You've Been"	4:01
8.	"Up in Here"	5:07
Total length:		37:11

== Charts ==
Chart (1979)	Peak position
U.S. Billboard 200	35
Billboard US Soul	2

=== Singles ===
Year	Single	Chart positions		
Year	Single	US	US R&B	US Dance
1979	"Move Your Boogie Body"	57 (1980)	3	90
1980	"Today Is the Day"	60	25	-

== Certifications ==
Region	Certification	Certified units/sales
United States (RIAA)	Gold	500,000^{^}
^{^} Shipments figures based on certification alone.
