= Propositions (album) =

Studio album by the Bar-Kays
- Released: November 9, 1982
- Recorded: 1982
- Studio: Ardent, Memphis, Tennessee
- Genre: Funk; rock; soul
- Label: Mercury
- Producer: Allen Jones

The Bar-Kays chronology
Nightcruising (1981)	Propositions (1982)	Dangerous (1984)

Professional ratings
Review scores
Source	Rating
AllMusic	3/5 stars

Propositions is an album by the Memphis, Tennessee-based funk band the Bar-Kays, released on Mercury Records in November 1982. The album reached number nine on the Billboard R&B albums chart and contained three hits: the uptempo singles "Do It (Let Me See You Shake)", "She Talks to Me with Her Body", and the ballad "Anticipation".

== Track listing ==
1. "Propositions" – 5:49
2. "Tripping Out" – 4:54
3. "Anticipation" – 5:46
4. "(Busted)" – 2:05
5. "Do It (Let Me See You Shake)" – 6:02
6. "She Talks to Me with Her Body" – 6:06
7. "I Can't Believe You're Leaving Me" – 4:04
8. "You Made a Change in My Life" – 4:18

== Charts ==
Chart (1982)	Peak position
Billboard Top Pop Albums	51
Billboard Top Black Albums	9

=== Singles ===
Year	Single	Chart positions	
Year	Single	US R&B	US Dance
1983	"She Talks to Me with Her Body"	13	62
1983	"Do It (Let Me See You Shake)"	9	-
