= I Feel Like I'm Falling in Love =

I Feel Like I'm Falling in Love or similar variations may refer to:

- "I Feel Like I'm Falling in Love", a 1965 solo single by Jimmy Beaumont of The Skyliners
- "I Feel Like I'm Falling in Love Again" (1969) and "I'm Falling in Love (I Feel Good All Over)" (1973) singles by The Fantastic Four
- "Feelslikeimfallinginlove", a 2024 single by Coldplay
- "Feels Like Im Falling in Love", a 1981 single by the Bar-Kays from Nightcruising

== See also ==
- "Can't Help Falling in Love", a song written by Hugo Peretti, Luigi Creatore, and George David Weiss and notably recorded by Elvis Presley in 1961
- "This Is What Falling in Love Feels Like", 2021 single by Jvke, and title of a 2022 compilation album
