= Money Talks (The Bar-Kays album) =

Studio album by the Bar-Kays
- Released: October 1978
- Recorded: 1972–1975
- Studio: Stax, Memphis, Tennessee
- Genre: Funk
- Length: 34:19
- Label: Stax
- Producer: Allen Jones

The Bar-Kays chronology
Flying High on Your Love (1977)	Money Talks (1978)	Light of Life (1978)

Money Talks is an album by the Memphis, Tennessee-based funk band the Bar-Kays.

== Reception ==
Professional ratings
Review scores
Source	Rating
AllMusic	4/5 stars
The Rolling Stone Album Guide	3/5 stars

Made up of tracks recorded for Stax Records before its 1975 collapse, Money Talks was released on Stax by its new owner, Fantasy Records, in October 1978 to capitalize on the Bar-Kays' newfound success at Mercury Records. This album would chart at number twenty one on the Billboard Soul Album charts. The single "Holy Ghost" would chart at number nine on the Soul Singles Charts.

== Track listing ==
1. "Holy Ghost" – 3:56
2. "Feelin' Alright" – 4:56
3. "Monster" – 6:50
4. "Money Talks" – 6:51
5. "Mean Mistreater" – 5:45
6. "Holy Ghost (Reborn)" – 6:01

Note: The most popular version of "Holy Ghost" was the 8:30 extended disco mix released on 12-inch single.

== Charts ==
Chart (1978)	Peak position
U.S. Billboard 200	72 (1979)
Billboard US Soul	21

=== Singles ===
Year	Single	Chart positions
Year	Single	US R&B
1979	"Holy Ghost"	9
