= As One (The Bar-Kays album) =

Studio album by the Bar-Kays
- Released: November 1980
- Recorded: 1980
- Studio: Ardent, Memphis, Tennessee
- Genre: Funk; disco
- Length: 36:03
- Label: Mercury
- Producer: Allen Jones

The Bar-Kays chronology
Injoy (1979)	As One (1980)	Nightcruising (1981)

Professional ratings
Review scores
Source	Rating
AllMusic	2/5 stars

As One is an album by the Memphis, Tennessee funk band the Bar-Kays released on Mercury Records in November 1980. The album reached number six on the Billboard Soul Albums chart.

== Track listing ==
1. "Boogie Body Land" – 5:49
2. "Say It Through Love" – 3:54
3. "Work It Out" – 4:30
4. "Body Fever" – 4:10
5. "As One" – 4:26
6. "Take the Time to Love Somebody" – 4:09
7. "Open Your Heart" – 4:12
8. "Deliver Us" – 4:53

== Charts ==
Chart (1981)	Peak position
US Billboard 200	57
US Billboard Top Soul Albums	6

=== Singles ===
Year	Single	Chart positions	
Year	Single	US R&B	US Dance
1981	"Body Fever"	42	-
1981	"Boogie Body Land"	7	73
