= King of the Blues Guitar =

Compilation album by Albert King
- Released: 1969
- Recorded: 1966–1968
- Studio: Stax, Memphis, U.S.
- Genre: Blues
- Label: Atlantic
- Producer: Jim Stewart

Albert King chronology
Years Gone By (1969)	King of the Blues Guitar (1969)	Blues for Elvis – King Does the King's Things (1970)

King of the Blues Guitar is a compilation album by American blues guitarist and singer Albert King, released by Atlantic Records in 1969. The album contains songs that Stax Records originally released on singles, including five that were also included on King's 1967 compilation, Born Under a Bad Sign. It reached number 194 on the Billboard 200 album chart in 1969.

When Atlantic re-released King of the Blues Guitar on CD format in 1989, it included an additional six tracks, thus compiling all of King's Stax singles from 1966 to 1968, plus the 1969 Atlantic single "The Hunter", backed with "As the Years Go Passing By".

== Critical reception ==
Professional ratings
Review scores
Source	Rating
The Penguin Guide to Blues Recordings	+ “Crown”

In a review, Dan Forte gave the album AllMusic's highest rating, five out of five stars. He also praised the CD reissue, which includes the balance of the tracks from Born Under a Bad Sign. The Penguin Guide to Blues Recordings awarded the album a “crown”, indicating a recording of exceptional merit.

== Track listing ==
Details are taken from the 1969 Atlantic LP liner notes and may differ from other sources.

Side one
No.	Title	Writer(s)	Length
1.	"Cold Feet"	Albert King, Al Jackson Jr.	2:43
2.	"You're Gonna Need Me"	King	2:45
3.	"Born Under a Bad Sign"	Booker T. Jones, William Bell	2:45
4.	"I Love Lucy"	Bell, Jones	2:45
5.	"Crosscut Saw"	R. G. Ford	2:33
6.	"You Sure Drive a Hard Bargain"	Betty Crutcher, Allen Jones	2:55

Side two
No.	Title	Writer(s)	Length
1.	"Oh, Pretty Woman"	A. C. Williams	2:45
2.	"Overall Junction"	King	2:19
3.	"Funk-Shun"	King	2:30
4.	"Laundromat Blues"	Sandy Jones	3:19
5.	"Personal Manager"	David Porter, King	4:28

For the 1989 CD reissue, Atlantic re-sequenced the album and added six bonus tracks. The bonus tracks are listed in the order they appear, not the actual CD positions.

1989 CD bonus tracks
No.	Title	Writer(s)	Length
1.	"Down Don't Bother Me"	King	2:13
2.	"Kansas City"	Jerry Leiber, Mike Stoller	2:29
3.	"The Very Thought of You"	Ray Noble	3:45
4.	"The Hunter"	Jones, Carl Wells, Steve Cropper, Donald Dunn, Jackson	2:43
5.	"I Almost Lost My Mind"	Ivory Joe Hunter	3:25
6.	"As the Years Go Passing By"	Deadric Malone a.k.a. Don Robey	3:43

== Personnel ==
Details are taken from the 1989 CD reissue.

- Albert King – vocals, lead guitar
- Booker T. Jones – keyboards
- Steve Cropper – guitar
- Donald Dunn – bass
- Al Jackson Jr. – drums
- The Memphis Horns:

- Wayne Jackson – trumpet
- Andrew Love – tenor saxophone
- Unidentified – second tenor saxophone
