= Lovejoy (album) =

Studio album by Albert King
- Released: July 1971
- Recorded: December 1970 – January 1971
- Studio: Skyhill Studios, Hollywood Hills, California; Muscle Shoals Sound Studio, Sheffield, Alabama
- Genre: Blues
- Length: 36:23
- Label: Stax
- Producer: Don Nix

Albert King chronology
| Blues for Elvis – King Does the King's Things (1970) | Lovejoy (1971) | I'll Play the Blues for You (1972) |

Professional ratings
Review scores
| Source | Rating |
|---|---|
| AllMusic | 2.5/5 stars |
| The Encyclopedia of Popular Music | 2/5 stars |
| MusicHound Rock: The Essential Album Guide | 3.5/5 stars |
| The Penguin Guide to Blues Recordings | 3.5/4 stars |
| The Rolling Stone Album Guide | 4/5 stars |

Lovejoy is a studio album by Albert King, released in 1971. The album peaked at No. 188 on the Billboard 200.

== Production ==
The album was produced by Don Nix, who also penned some of the songs. "Lovejoy, Ill." is about Brooklyn, Illinois, which is nicknamed Lovejoy, after Elijah P. Lovejoy. King got his start in Lovejoy.

== Critical reception ==
In Allmusic, Cub Koda gave Lovejoy 5 out of 3.5 stars, calling it "This 1970 studio effort teamed up Albert with producer Don Nix, who supplied the majority of the original material here. Kicking off with a typical reading of the Rolling Stones' "Honky Tonk Woman" and including Taj Mahal's "She Caught the Katy and Left Me a Mule to Ride," the session is split between a Hollywood date with Jesse Ed Davis, Jim Keltner, and Duck Dunn in the band and one at Muscle Shoals with Roger Hawkins, David Hood, and Barry Beckett in the lineup. Although all of this is well-produced, there's hardly any fireworks out of Albert or any of the players aboard, making this an unessential addition for any but Albert King completists."

== Track listing ==
1. "Honky Tonk Woman" (Mick Jagger, Keith Richards) – 3:59
2. "Bay Area Blues" (Donald "Duck" Dunn, Don Nix) – 2:55
3. "Corrina, Corrina" (Don Nix) – 3:45
4. "She Caught the Katy (And Left Me a Mule to Ride)" (Taj Mahal, James Rachell) – 3:56
5. "For the Love of a Woman" (Don Nix) – 4:20
6. "Lovejoy, Ill." (Don Nix) – 3:46
7. "Everybody Wants to Go to Heaven" (Don Nix) – 4:20
8. "Going Back to Iuka" (Don Nix) – 3:58
9. "Like a Road Leading Home" (Don Nix, Dan Penn) – 5:24

== Personnel ==
- Albert King – electric guitar, vocals
- Tippy Armstrong, Jesse Ed Davis, Wayne Perkins – guitar
- Barry Beckett, John Gallie – keyboards
- Donald Dunn, David Hood – bass guitar
- Roger Hawkins, Jim Keltner – drums
- Sandy Konikoff – percussion
- Jeanie Green – backing vocals
- The Mount Zion Singers – backing vocals

Technical

- Larry Hamby, Marlin Greene, Peter Nicholls, Steve Smith – engineer
- John Fry – remix engineer
- Joel Brodsky – photography
