= Green Onions (album) =

Studio album by Booker T. & the M.G.'s
- Released: October 1962
- Recorded: June–August 1962
- Studio: Stax, Memphis, Tennessee
- Genre: R&B; rock; soul
- Length: 34:55
- Label: Stax; Atlantic
- Producer: Jim Stewart

Booker T. & the M.G.'s chronology
Green Onions (1962)	Soul Dressing (1965)

Singles from Green Onions
- 1. "Green Onions" Released: July 1962; 2. "Mo' Onions" Released: January 1964

Professional ratings
Review scores
Source	Rating
AllMusic	4.5/5 stars
BBC Music	favorable
The Encyclopedia of Popular Music	4/5 stars
The Great Rock Discography	9/10
MusicHound R&B	3.5/5 stars
PopMatters	8/10
The Rolling Stone Album Guide	3.5/5 stars
Under the Radar	8/10

Green Onions is the debut album by Booker T. & the M.G.'s, released on Stax Records in October 1962. It reached number 33 on the pop album chart in the month of its release. The title single was a worldwide hit and has been covered by dozens of artists, including the Blues Brothers and Roy Buchanan (both with Steve Cropper on guitar), as well as the Ventures, Al Kooper, the Shadows, Mongo Santamaría, Deep Purple (live and studio versions) and Count Basie.

Three previous Stax LPs – two by the Mar-Keys, one by Carla Thomas – had been issued on Atlantic Records. Green Onions was the first album released on the Stax label. It was also Stax's first charting album, peaking at number 33 on the Billboard 200. The album features only instrumental songs and features Steve Cropper playing a Fender Telecaster.

The cover photo was shot by Irving Schild, who would go on to have a 52-year career as Mad magazine's primary photographer. The album was included in Robert Dimery's 1001 Albums You Must Hear Before You Die.

In 2012, the album was added to the National Recording Registry by the Library of Congress as being "culturally, historically, and/or aesthetically significant".

== Track listing ==
Side One
No.	Title	Writer(s)	Length
1.	"Green Onions"	Booker T. Jones, Steve Cropper, Lewie Steinberg, Al Jackson Jr.	2:53
2.	"Rinky Dink" (Dave "Baby" Cortez cover)	David Clowney, Paul Winley	2:41
3.	"I Got a Woman" (Ray Charles cover)	Ray Charles, Renald Richard	3:35
4.	"Mo' Onions"	Jones, Cropper, Steinberg, Jackson	2:57
5.	"Twist and Shout" (The Top Notes cover)	Phil Medley, Bert Berns	2:13
6.	"Behave Yourself"	Jones, Cropper, Steinberg, Jackson	3:55
Total length:			18:14

Side Two
No.	Title	Writer(s)	Length
7.	"Stranger on the Shore" (Acker Bilk cover)	Acker Bilk	2:22
8.	"Lonely Avenue" (Ray Charles cover)	Doc Pomus	3:30
9.	"One Who Really Loves You" (Mary Wells cover)	Smokey Robinson	2:26
10.	"You Can't Sit Down" (The Bim Bam Boos cover)	Dee Clark, Kal Mann, Cornell Muldrow	2:51
11.	"A Woman, a Lover, a Friend" (Jackie Wilson cover)	Sidney Wyche	2:33
12.	"Comin' Home Baby" (Dave Bailey Quintet cover)	Bob Dorough, Ben Tucker	3:12
Total length:			16:54

== Personnel ==
Booker T. & the M.G.s

- Booker T. Jones – Hammond M3 organ
- Steve Cropper – guitar
- Lewis Steinberg – double bass, bass guitar
- Al Jackson Jr. – drums

Technical

- Haig Adishian – cover design
- Irving Schild – cover photography

== Chart history ==
Name	Chart (1962)	Peak position
Green Onions	U.S. Pop Albums Chart	33
"Green Onions"	U.S. Billboard Hot 100	3
"Green Onions"	U.S. Billboard R&B Singles	1
"Mo' Onions"	U.S. Billboard Hot 100	97
"Mo' Onions"	U.S. Billboard R&B Singles	97
