= Blues for Elvis – King Does the King's Things =

Blues for Elvis - King Does the King's Things

Studio album by Albert King
- Released: 1970
- Recorded: 1969
- Genre: Blues
- Length: 36:41
- Label: Stax
- Producer: Donald "Duck" Dunn, Al Jackson, Jr.

Albert King chronology
King of the Blues Guitar (1969)	Blues for Elvis - King Does the King's Things (1970)	Lovejoy (1971)

Professional ratings
Review scores
Source	Rating
AllMusic	3/5 stars
The Penguin Guide to Blues Recordings	2/4 stars

Blues for Elvis – King Does the King's Things is the fifth studio album by Albert King. The songs in the album are versions of songs previously recorded by Elvis Presley. On the album sleeve there is a review by Albert Goldman, music critic for Life, who says, among other things: "For the first time on record, the King of Blues is meeting the King of Rock ... you're gonna love every minute of this musical feast fit for kings."

== Track listing ==
1. "Hound Dog" (Jerry Leiber, Mike Stoller) – 4:03
2. "That's All Right" (Arthur Crudup) – 4:08
3. "All Shook Up" (Otis Blackwell, Elvis Presley) – 2:29
4. "Jailhouse Rock" (Leiber, Stoller) – 3:36
5. "Heartbreak Hotel" (Mae Boren Axton, Thomas Durden, Presley) – 6:05
6. "Don't Be Cruel" (Blackwell, Presley) – 3:27
7. "One Night" (Dave Bartholomew, Pearl King, Anita Steiman) – 4:18
8. "Blue Suede Shoes" (Carl Perkins) – 3:16
9. "Love Me Tender" (Vera Matson, Presley) – 5:19

== Personnel ==
- Albert King – electric guitar, vocals
- Marvell Thomas – piano, organ
- Donald Dunn – bass guitar and also producer and arranger, with Al Jackson Jr.
- James Alexander – bass guitar
- Willie Hall – drums

Technical

- Terry Manning – audio engineer
- Shirley Glaser – cover portrait
- Honeya Thompson – art direction
