= Nightcruising =

Studio album by Bar-Kays
- Released: November 1981
- Recorded: 1981
- Studio: Ardent, Memphis, Tennessee
- Genre: R&B; dance
- Label: Mercury
- Producer: Allen Jones

Bar-Kays chronology
As One (1980)	Nightcruising (1981)	Propositions (1982)

Singles from Nightcruising
- 1. "Hit and Run" Released: October 1981

Professional ratings
Review scores
Source	Rating
AllMusic	2/5 stars

Nightcruising is an album by the Memphis, Tennessee-based band the Bar-Kays, released on Mercury Records in November 1981. The album reached number six on the Billboard R&B albums chart. The band embraced a more up to date sound with keyboards and synthesizers with this album, and it was much better received by fans than their previous release. Nightcruising is considered one of the Bar-Kays' best albums, and was their third to be certified Gold for sales of over 500,000 copies.

== Track listing ==
All tracks composed by the Bar-Kays and Allen Jones, except where indicated.

1. "Nightcruising" – 4:18
2. "Hit and Run" – 5:51
3. "Feels Like I'm Falling in Love" – 3:50
4. "Freaky Behavior" (Allen Jones, Howard Redmond, Jr.) – 5:10
5. "Touch Tone" – 4:15
6. "Unforgettable Dream" – 4:35
7. "Traffic Jammer" – 5:50
8. "Backseat Driver" – 3:54

== Charts ==
Chart (1981–1982)	Peak position
Billboard Top Pop Albums	55
Billboard Top Soul Albums	6

=== Singles ===
Year	Single	Chart positions	
Year	Single	US R&B	US Dance
1981	"Hit and Run"	5	49 (1982)

== Certifications ==
Region	Certification	Certified units/sales
United States (RIAA)	Gold	500,000^{^}
^{^} Shipments figures based on certification alone.
