= The Mar-Keys =

American studio session band

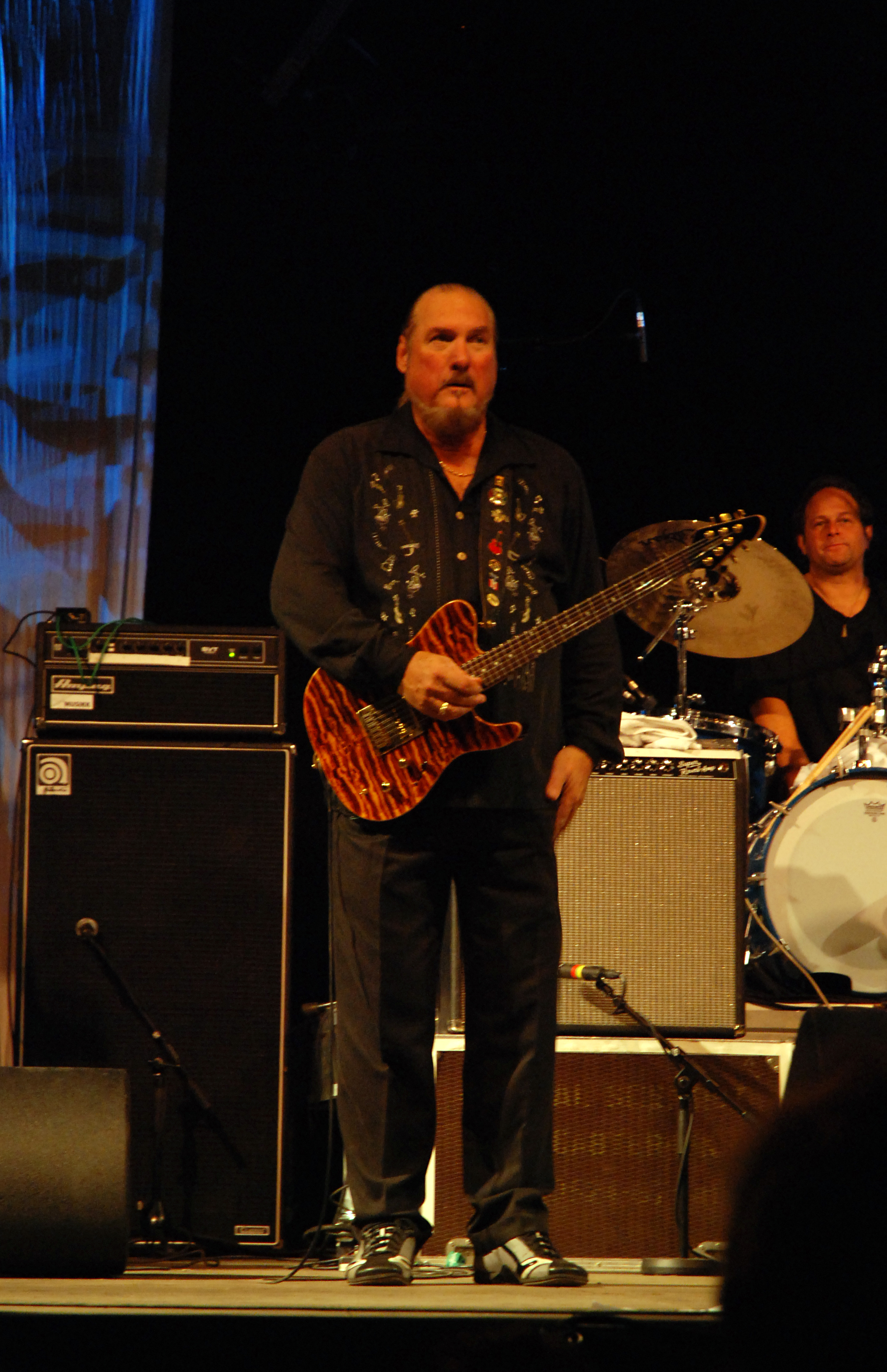
Guitarist Steve Cropper (pictured in 2007) was a founding member of the Mar-Keys

The Mar-Keys were an American studio session band for Stax Records, in Memphis, Tennessee, in the 1960s. Formed in 1958 as the first house band for the label, their backing music formed the foundation for the early 1960s Stax sound.

== Career ==
=== Early success with "Last Night" (1961) ===
The group began as the Royal Spades while its members were in high school. They tried to get a record made for the local Satellite Records (the forerunner of Stax), unsuccessfully, even though the label was owned by the mother and uncle of the group's tenor sax player, Charles "Packy" Axton. When the band eventually made a record, Axton's mother, Estelle Axton, convinced them to change their name, and they became "The Mar-Keys". However, the live lineup of the Mar-Keys was not always the same as the band heard on the recordings.

Their first and most famous recording was the organ- and saxophone-driven single "Last Night", a number three hit nationally in the US in 1961. It sold over one million copies, earning certification as a gold disc. The lineup for this recording included the Royal Spades' Steve Cropper (normally a guitarist, here playing second keyboard; producer Chips Moman did not want a guitar part on the song), Packy Axton (tenor sax), Wayne Jackson (trumpet), and Jerry Lee "Smoochy" Smith (main keyboards), augmented by horn players Floyd Newman (baritone sax), Gilbert Caple (tenor sax) and others. The authorship of the song, credited simply to "Mar-Keys" on the label, is registered with BMI to Axton, Caple, Newman, Smith, and producer Moman.

=== Follow-ups and fragmentation (1961–1966) ===
Singles and albums continued to appear under the Mar-Keys name throughout the 1960s, though none anywhere near as successful as "Last Night". The original all-white band continued to play live dates for a time, but fairly quickly, were largely replaced for studio recordings by session players. This meant that in practice, "The Mar-Keys" became a de facto name for the racially integrated Stax Records house band, which had a floating membership. The most frequent Mar-Keys studio players during this era, subject to change from session to session, were:

- Guitar: Steve Cropper
- Bass: Donald "Duck" Dunn, or occasionally Lewie Steinberg (until 1964).
- Keyboards: Smoochy Smith (occasionally through 1963) and/or Marvell Thomas (frequently through 1963); essentially supplanted by Booker T. Jones (with increasing frequency from 1962) and/or Isaac Hayes (after mid-1964).
- Drums: Howard Grimes (1961–62) or Terry Johnson (occasionally, 1961–62); supplanted by Al Jackson Jr. (from mid-1962).
- Horns: varying combinations of Wayne Jackson, Floyd Newman, Don Nix, Gilbert Caple, Vinny Trauth (through 1963), Packy Axton (through 1964), Andrew Love (from 1964).

These musicians, in addition to being the studio Mar-Keys, served as the backing band on singles and albums by dozens of rock, R&B, and soul music artists who recorded at the Stax studios, including Otis Redding, Carla Thomas, Wilson Pickett, and many others.

==== Booker T. & the M.G.'s ====
While still involved with the Mar-Keys and Stax studio work, Cropper, Steinberg, Jones and Al Jackson Jr. also began recording as Booker T. & the M.G.'s in 1962. Consequently, from then through 1966 instrumental music recorded by the Stax house band was issued under the name of either the Mar-Keys or Booker T. & the M.G.'s, depending on the type of recording: in general, tracks featuring a horn section were credited to the Mar-Keys, and those without horns were credited to Booker T. & the M.G.'s.

Dunn replaced Steinberg in the M.G.'s in 1964, having already played with the Mar-Keys both live and in the studio for several years.

The demise of the group as a singles act occurred due to the success of several of its members. By the time of the 1965 recording "Boot-Leg", singles credited to Booker T. & the M.G.'s were far outselling recordings credited to the Mar-Keys, who had failed to chart in years. Therefore, the decision was made to issue the horn-driven "Boot-Leg" (co-written with Packy Axton and Isaac Hayes) as a track by Booker T. & the M.G.'s, even though it had been conceived of as a Mar-Keys track, and Booker T. Jones himself did not actually play on it.

With the top 40 chart success of "Boot-Leg", by the end of 1966 the Mar-Keys name was no longer appearing on singles.

=== The six-man line-up (1967–1969) ===
Although the Mar-Keys were no longer routinely issuing singles, the name still had a certain amount of marketability, and in the late 1960s the Mar-Keys name was used whenever horn players Andrew Love and Wayne Jackson (later known as the Memphis Horns) teamed with Booker T. & the M.G.'s in live performances. The two groups shared billing on a live album in 1967, Back to Back, from a concert in Paris.

For the 1969 album Damifiknow!, the Mar-Keys were back in the studio, and were explicitly identified in the album credits as the sextet of Steve Cropper, Duck Dunn, Booker T. Jones, Al Jackson, Andrew Love, and Wayne Jackson (no relation to Al). The album was not a chart success, and the Mar-Keys name was essentially retired once again.

=== Final years (1970–1971) ===
For the final album credited to the Mar-Keys, 1971's Memphis Experience Stax simply assembled a number of instrumental cuts from various sources, without regard for group continuity. Three of the album's seven cuts were outtakes from sessions by the Bar-Kays, while the other cuts were performed by various uncredited Memphis musicians with no other ties to the Mar-Keys' past.

=== Legacy and later activity ===
The legacy of the Mar-Keys is that they were key players in the development of Southern soul and Memphis soul.

In 2012, the Mar-Keys regrouped with a lineup consisting of original members Wayne Jackson, Floyd Newman, Don Nix, Smoochy Smith, Terry Johnson, plus former M.G. Lewie Steinberg, and original member Packy Axton's son Chuck.

Terry Johnson (born James Terry Johnson on April 3, 1943, in Memphis, Tennessee) died on March 19, 2016, after a short illness, at age 72.

Jerry Lee "Smoochy" Smith (born November 13, 1939 in East Prairie, Missouri) died on September 6, 2022, in Bartlett, Tennessee, at the age of 82.

== Members ==
- Steve Cropper – guitar
- Charlie "Redman" Freeman – guitar
- Donald "Duck" Dunn - bass guitar
- Howard Grimes – drums
- James "Terry" Johnson – drums, piano
- Wayne Jackson – trumpet, trombone
- Charles "Packy" Axton – tenor saxophone
- Gilbert Caple – tenor saxophone
- Floyd Newman – baritone saxophone, vocals on "Last Night"
- Don Nix – baritone saxophone
- Andrew Love - tenor saxophone
- Gene Parker – tenor saxophone
- Joe Arnold – alto saxophone
- Jerry Lee "Smoochy" Smith – keyboards
- Marvell Thomas – keyboards
- Booker T. Jones – keyboards
- Isaac Hayes – organ
- Al Jackson Jr. – drums
- Billy Purser (aka Gary Burbank) – drums
- Rick Keefer – bass guitar
- Ronnie "Angel" Stoots was the band's lead vocalist when they had gigs on the road.

== Discography ==
=== Albums ===
- 1961: Last Night! (Atlantic SD-8055) August release
- 1962: Do the Pop-Eye with the Mar-Keys (Atlantic SD-8062)
- 1966: The Great Memphis Sound (Stax S-707)
- 1967: Back to Back [live] (Stax S-720) with Booker T. & the M.G.'s
- 1969: Damifiknow! (Stax STS-2025)
- 1971: Memphis Experience (Stax STS-2036)

=== Singles ===
Year	A-side	B-side	Label	Peak chart positions		Album
Year	A-side	B-side	Label	US	US R&B	Album
1961	"Last Night"	"Night Before"	Satellite 107; Stax 107	3	2	Last Night
1961	"Morning After"	"Diana"	Stax 112	60	—	Last Night
1961	"About Noon"	"Sack-O-Woe"	Stax 114	—	—	Last Night
1961	"Foxy"	"One Degree North"	Stax 115	—	—	Non-album single
1962	"Popeye Stroll"	"Po-Dunk"	Stax 121	94	—	Do the Pop-Eye
1962	"Whot's Happenin'!"	"You Got It"	Stax 124	—	—	Non-album single
1962	"Sailor Man Waltz"	"Sack O Woe"	Stax 129	—	—	Do the Pop-Eye
1963	"Bo-Time"	"The Dribble"	Stax 133	—	—	Non-album singles
1964	"Bush Bash"	"Beach Bash"	Stax 156	—	—	Non-album singles
1965	"Banana Juice"	"The Shovel"	Stax 166	121	—	Non-album singles
1965	"Grab This Thing, Pt. 1"	"Grab This Thing, Pt. 2"	Stax 181	111	—	The Great Memphis Sound
1966	"Philly Dog"	"Honey Pot"	Stax 185	89	19	The Great Memphis Sound
1969	"Double or Nothing"	"Knock On Wood"	Stax 0029	—	—	Damifiknow!
"—" denotes releases that did not chart or were not released in that territory.
