= Soul Dressing =

Studio album by Booker T. & the M.G.'s
- Released: March 1965
- Recorded: 1963–1964
- Studios: Stax, Memphis
- Genres: Soul-funk, soul jazz, R&B, instrumental rock
- Length: 31:05
- Label: Stax/Atlantic
- Producer: Jim Stewart

Booker T. & the M.G.'s chronology
Green Onions (1962)	Soul Dressing (1965)	And Now! (1966)

Singles from Soul Dressing
- 1. "Jellybread" Released: 1963; 2. "Home Grown" Released: 1963; 3. "Chinese Checkers" Released: 1963; 4. "Soul Dressing" Released: 1964; 5. "Can't Be Still" Released: 1964

Soul Dressing is the second album by the Southern soul band Booker T. & the M.G.'s, released in 1965. It was their final album with bassist Lewie Steinberg, who was replaced by Donald "Duck" Dunn.

The title track peaked at No. 95 on the Billboard Hot 100.

== Critical reception ==
Professional ratings
Review scores
Source	Rating
AllMusic	3/5 stars
The Encyclopedia of Popular Music	4/5 stars
MusicHound Rock: The Essential Album Guide	3.5/5 stars
The Rolling Stone Album Guide	3/5 stars

The Guardian deemed the album "a classic," writing that it was part of a run of albums that "delighted mods and still represent the epitome of subtle soulfulness."

== Covers ==
The track "Plum Nellie" was recorded by British rock band Small Faces in 1966, and released on their compilation album From the Beginning in 1967.

== Track listing ==
All songs written by Steve Cropper, Al Jackson Jr., Booker T. Jones, and Lewie Steinberg, unless noted

Side one
No.	Title	Writer(s)	Length
1.	"Soul Dressing"		2:28
2.	"Tic-Tac-Toe"		2:34
3.	"Big Train"		2:32
4.	"Jellybread"		2:32
5.	"Aw' Mercy"		2:38
6.	"Outrage"	Cropper, Jackson, Steinberg, William Allan	2:35
Total length:			15:19

Side two
No.	Title	Writer(s)	Length
1.	"Night Owl Walk"		3:14
2.	"Chinese Checkers"		2:29
3.	"Home Grown"		3:14
4.	"Mercy Mercy"	Don Covay, Ronald Alonzo Miller	2:36
5.	"Plum Nellie"		2:07
6.	"Can't Be Still"		1:59

== Personnel ==
Booker T. & the M. G.'s

- Booker T. Jones - piano, Hammond organ, Wurlitzer electronic piano, trombone on "Chinese Checkers"
- Steve Cropper - guitar
- Lewis Steinberg - bass guitar
- Al Jackson Jr. - drums

Additional personnel

- Wayne Jackson - trumpet
- Floyd Newman - baritone saxophone
- Charles "Packy" Axton - tenor saxophone
- Marvin Israel - cover design
