= Irving Schild =

Belgian commercial photographer (born 1931)

Irving Schild (born 1931) is a Belgian commercial photographer who has worked for agencies and clients. He was the primary photographer for MAD Magazine for more than five decades, from 1965 to 2017.

Schild was nine years old when his family fled from Brussels, Belgium to escape the Nazis. Speaking of his father in 2019, Schild recalled, "He said as soon as the first bomb falls in Belgium, we are going to go to France". The Schild family traveled to France, then the Alps, and finally to Rome. Along the way, his father traded drawings for food; after Rome was liberated by the Allies, he drew and sold portraits of the soldiers standing in front of the Colisseum for a dollar. "I inherited his talent," said Schild. After the Allies liberated Rome in 1944, the Schilds were among 1000 carefully selected refugees who were invited to the U.S. by President Roosevelt as guests of the country. When World War II ended, the family opted to apply for immigrant status rather than return to Europe.

While studying art in America, Schild was drafted, joined the Marines, and was sent to a military photography school. Afterward, he settled in New York City, studied graphics design at Cooper Union, freelanced for such publications as Life, Glamour and Esquire, and set up his own photography studio. Mad Magazine cartoonist Sergio Aragones noticed his photos while passing by, and suggested that Schild approach the magazine for work. Schild's first Mad assignment was a 1965 parody of a Kellogg's cereal campaign, featuring Lenny Brenner of Mad's art department dressed as a marching band musician, eating Corn Flakes out of his tuba.

It was Schild's next three assignments, all ad parodies, that solidified his role with the magazine. Decades before Photoshop, he had to devise ways to stage and shoot a washing machine bursting up through a living room floor for a Dash detergent spoof; how to freeze a woman in mid-air who was being propelled through a wooden door by the force of Ajax cleanser; and how to suspend a man crashing violently through the roof of a Hertz Rent-a-Car convertible in an ad titled "The Day They Forgot to Put the Top Down for the Hertz Commercial." (Hertz commercials featured a man flying through the air and gently landing in one of its rental cars.) For the latter assignment, Schild managed to wheedle a real Hertz outlet into letting him damage one of its vehicles' roofs, and to stage the aerial mishap in front of a Hertz location.

Schild also served as chairman of the Photography Department at the Fashion Institute of Technology while continuing to shoot commercial assignments. These included food photography for clients as varied as Bon Appetit magazine and Stax Records, who hired Schild to deliver the cover for the Green Onions album by Booker T. and the MG's.

When Schild began at Mad he used a large, heavy camera that required a tripod at the request of editor Al Feldstein; half a century and nearly 250 photo assignments later, his work was digital.

Perhaps owing to his childhood experiences, his favorite Mad assignment was a roll of toilet paper with a swastika pattern that was used as a poster insert with the slogan "Wipe Out Hate!" "This stands up much more today than even then," Schild said. "It’s amazing how short people's memories are."
