= Out of the Blues (album) =

Studio album by Boz Scaggs
- Released: July 27, 2018
- Recorded: 2018
- Studios: Sunset Sound (Hollywood, California): Fantasy Studios and Opus Studios (Berkeley, California)
- Genres: Blues; rock; R&B
- Length: 39:34 (standard edition)
- Label: Concord
- Producers: Boz Scaggs; Chris Tabarez; Michael Rodriguez

Boz Scaggs chronology
A Fool to Care (2015)	Out of the Blues (2018)	Detour (2025)

Out of the Blues is the nineteenth studio album by American singer-songwriter Boz Scaggs. The album, a mixture of vintage classics and four original compositions by close friend Jack "Applejack" Walroth, is the last in a trilogy that began with 2013's Memphis and continued with 2015's A Fool to Care. The album contains songs by blues musicians including Bobby "Blue" Bland, Jimmy Reed, Magic Sam, and Neil Young. It was released on July 27, 2018, on Concord Records. It reached number one on the Billboard Top Blues Albums chart. It was nominated for the Grammy Award for Best Contemporary Blues Album at the 61st Annual Grammy Awards.

== Critical reception ==
Professional ratings
Review scores
Source	Rating
AllMusic	4/5 stars
American Songwriter	4/5 stars
Elmore	9.3/10
PopMatters	7/10 stars

The Associated Press writes, "Sometimes with more gloss, at times with more grit, but always with great feeling, Boz Scaggs has kept some form of the blues close to the surface during most of his career, which has already sailed past the 50-year milestone."

Something Else writes that Scaggs is, "three for three. Long past the hit-making phenomena of the Silk Degrees years, Scaggs is still providing some very good reasons to keep listening to him."

Charles Donovan on PopMatters writes, "Despite its title, on Out of the Blues, Scaggs actually takes the listener back into the blues. For the third time in a row, he deftly avoids the pitfalls of making these sorts of albums by selecting unpredictable material. In fact, almost half the album is made up of new songs written by musician/friend, Jack Walroth." He continues, "The Walroth material absolutely sparkles, with 'Rock and Stick,' the album opener, having the heat and smoothness of a sports car in the sun, and the kind of groove that will satisfy fans of Silk Degrees. Scagg's voice is affected by age but not to its detriment. It's the same voice with rougher edges, and rougher edges only serve to enhance this kind of music."

== Track listing ==
No.	Title	Writer(s)	Length
1.	"Rock and Stick"	Jack "Applejack" Walroth	4:50
2.	"I've Just Got to Forget You"	Don Deadric Robey	2:57
3.	"I've Just Got to Know"	Jimmy McCracklin	4:10
4.	"Radiator 110"	Jack Walroth	4:08
5.	"Little Miss Night and Day"	Boz Scaggs - Jack "Applejack" Walroth	5:20
6.	"On the Beach"	Neil Young	6:33
7.	"Down in Virginia"	Jimmy Reed - Manny Reed	3:24
8.	"Those Lies"	Jack Walroth	4:31
9.	"The Feeling Is Gone"	Don Deadric Robey	3:36
Total length:			39:34

Target exclusive bonus tracks

No.	Title	Writer(s)	Length
10.	"Good Information"	Jack Walroth	5:11
11.	"25 Years"	Jack Walroth	3:53
12.	"Good Lover"		3:54

Japan issue bonus tracks

No.	Title	Length
10.	"Good Information"
11.	"25 Years"

== Personnel ==
- Boz Scaggs – lead vocals, backing vocals, guitars (4, 7, 12), bass guitar (7), vocoder (10)
- Jim Cox – keyboards
- Jack "Applejack" Walroth – harmonica (1, 4, 12), guitars (4, 11), percussion (4), backing vocals (11)
- Ray Parker Jr. – acoustic guitars, electric guitars
- Doyle Bramhall II – guitars (1, 5–7, 12)
- Charlie Sexton – guitars (3, 5, 8, 10)
- Steve Freund – guitars (4)
- Willie Weeks – bass guitar (1–6, 8–12)
- Jim Keltner – drums (1–3, 5–12), percussion (8)
- Ricky Fataar – drums (4)
- Michael Rodriguez – shaker (11)
- Stephen "Doc" Kupka – baritone saxophone
- Eric Crystal – tenor saxophone
- Tom Politzer – tenor saxophone

=== Production ===
- Boz Scaggs – producer
- Michael Rodriguez – co-producer, engineer, mixing (2, 5–9, 12)
- Chris Taberez – co-producer, engineer, mixing (6)
- Niko Bolas – recording, mixing (1, 3, 4, 10, 11)
- Jim Eno – mixing (2)
- Jim Greer – assistant engineer
- Cody Hamilton – assistant engineer
- David Luke – assistant engineer
- Morgan Stratton – assistant engineer
- Richard Dodd – mastering at Bernie Grundman Mastering (Hollywood, California)
- Cindi Peters – production coordinator
- Fetzer Design – design
- Chris Phelps – photography

== Chart positions ==
Chart	Peak position
Belgian Albums (Ultratop Flanders)	163
Dutch Albums (MegaCharts)	105
Scottish Albums (OCC)	59
US Billboard Blues Albums	1
