= Animal (Bar-Kays album) =

Studio album by the Bar-Kays
- Released: 1989
- Studio: Kiva
- Genre: R&B
- Label: Mercury
- Producer: Kenni Hairston and Trevor Gale (tracks 1, 2 and 8), Harvey Henderson, Larry Dodson and Winston Stewart (co-producers on tracks 1, 2 and 8), James Mtume (tracks 3, 7 and 9), Jerry Goldstein (tracks 4–6), Sly Stone (co-producer on track 7)

The Bar-Kays chronology
Contagious (1987)	Animal (1989)	48 Hours (1994)

Animal is an album by the American R&B band the Bar-Kays, released in 1989.

The album peaked at No. 36 on the Billboard Top Black Albums chart. Its first single was "Struck By You", which peaked at No. 11 on the Hot Black Singles chart. The title track was also released as a single.

== Production ==
Produced at Kiva Studios, in Memphis, the album was recorded by a three-member lineup. Joe Walsh played guitar on the title track. "Just Like a Teeter Totter" was cowritten and coproduced by Sly Stone.

== Critical reception ==
Professional ratings
Review scores
Source	Rating
AllMusic	2/5 stars
The Encyclopedia of Popular Music	3/5 stars
Orlando Sentinel	3/5 stars
The Rolling Stone Album Guide	3/5 stars

The Orlando Sentinel concluded that, "although modern, metallic sounds shape the bouncing, bending rhythm of the title song, for instance, there's a touch of old- fashioned call-and-response interplay in the vocals." USA Today opined that "what's nice about this album, though, is the band's mature, unfunky handling of slow tunes ... 'Leaving You' shows they can be true balladeers." The New York Amsterdam News determined that although Animal "is thigh-high in funk-fortified R&B, the music is never dated."

AllMusic wrote that "it's important to remember that the Bar-Kays never stopped being a good band—it was taste and fashion that twisted the knife and pushed them aside." The Rolling Stone Album Guide thought that "their best cuts resemble lite pastiches of other bands' refinements."

== Track listing ==
No.	Title	Length
1.	"Animal"	5:14
2.	"Struck by You"	5:45
3.	"Stop! Look What You're Missing"	5:15
4.	"Someone Else"	4:49
5.	"Are U Available"	5:37
6.	"Get Your Fingers Wet"	5:45
7.	"Just Like a Teeter Totter"	4:14
8.	"I Adore You"	5:16
9.	"Leaving You"	5:15
