= A Fool to Care =

Studio album by Boz Scaggs
- Released: March 31, 2015
- Recorded: 2015
- Studios: Blackbird (Nashville, Tennessee); The Barn (Napa Valley, California)
- Genres: Blues, rock, rhythm and blues
- Label: 429 Records
- Producer: Steve Jordan

Boz Scaggs chronology
Memphis (2013)	A Fool to Care (2015)	Out of the Blues (2018)

Professional ratings
Review scores
Source	Rating
AllMusic	4/5 stars
Rolling Stone	4/5 stars

A Fool to Care is the eighteenth studio album by American singer-songwriter Boz Scaggs. It was released in the US on March 31, 2015, and in the UK on March 30, 2015, on 429 Records. The album was the second in a three-album series celebrating American roots music (Memphis being released in 2013 and Out of the Blues in 2018). The front cover was by Danny Clinch who photographed Scaggs in Conzelman Road, Sausalito, California.

== Critical reception ==
Rolling Stone writes, "These 12 songs map out a concise history of American soul, with a heavy dose of New Orleans strut... Backed throughout by a stellar group of studio aces — guitarist Ray Parker Jr., bassist Willie Weeks and drummer Steve Jordan, who also produced the album — Scaggs’ well-worn, textured voice deftly navigates this range of styles."

Blues Rock Review writes, "On each song, Scaggs puts his decades of experience and emotional connections to American roots music to work, producing a collection that stands as one of this year’s best blues records to date."

== Track listing ==
No.	Title	Writer(s)	Length
1.	"Rich Woman"	Dorothy LaBostrie, McKinley Millet	2:59
2.	"I'm a Fool to Care"	Ted Daffan	2:06
3.	"Hell to Pay" (featuring Bonnie Raitt)	Boz Scaggs	6:16
4.	"Small Town Talk"	Rick Danko, Robert Guidry	3:41
5.	"Last Tango on 16th Street"	Jack "Applejack" Walroth	6:26
6.	"There's a Storm A' Comin'"	Richard Hawley	4:14
7.	"I'm So Proud"	Curtis Mayfield	3:38
8.	"I Want to See You"	Jack "Applejack" Walroth	5:42
9.	"High Blood Pressure"	Huey "Piano" Smith	3:35
10.	"Full of Fire" (featuring The Love Sponge Strings)	Al Green, Mabon "Teenie" Hodges, Willie Mitchell	4:18
11.	"Love Don't Love Nobody" (featuring The Love Sponge Strings)	Joseph Jefferson, Charles Simmons	5:10
12.	"Whispering Pines" (featuring Lucinda Williams)	Richard Manuel, Robbie Robertson	4:20

Bonus Tracks

No.	Title	Writer(s)	Length
13.	"Gypsy Woman" (featuring The Love Sponge Strings)	Curtis Mayfield	2:57
14.	"Talk to Me, Talk to Me"	Joe Seneca	3:43
15.	"M. P. B."	Cecil Womack, Linda Womack	3:33

== Personnel ==
- Boz Scaggs – lead vocals, rhythm guitar (1, 3), guitars (2, 5, 8, 9, 15), acoustic guitar (4, 14), electric guitar (4), guitar fills (10), bass guitar (14), vibraphone (14)
- Jim Cox – Hammond B3 organ (1, 4, 6–8, 10, 11), acoustic piano (2–6, 9, 11), pump organ (6), Wurlitzer electric piano (7), Rhodes electric piano (13)
- Seth Asarnow – bandoneon (4, 5, 8), pump organ (11)
- Clifford Carter – synthesizers (6)
- Michael Anthony Logan Sr. – keyboards (15), programming (15), drums (15)
- Al Anderson – guitar figure (1), "chunk" guitar (3)
- Ray Parker Jr. – guitars (2, 5–11, 13), rhythm guitar (3), acoustic guitar (4), electric guitar (12)
- Bonnie Raitt – slide guitar (3), lead and harmony vocals (3)
- Paul Franklin – steel guitar (6, 12)
- Reggie Young – guitars (10, 11, 13)
- Willie Weeks – bass guitar (1–13, 15)
- Steve Jordan – drums (1–13), percussion (4, 5, 8), backing vocals (7, 8), horn conductor (10)
- Michael Rodriguez – drum programming (14)
- Jim Hoke – baritone saxophone (1, 2), bass clarinet (2, 8), accordion (4, 6), vibraphone (5, 7, 8), woodwind (5), woodwind arrangements (5), alto flute (8)
- Eric Crystal – alto saxophone (1, 2, 8), tenor saxophone (1, 2, 8), acoustic piano (8), saxophone (14)
- Doug Rowan – tenor saxophone (1, 8), alto saxophone (2)
- Lannie McMillan – tenor saxophone (10)
- Jack Hale – trombone (10)
- Ben Cauley – trumpet (10)
- Quentin Ware – trumpet (10)
- Lester Snell – horn arrangements (10), string arrangements and conductor (10, 11, 13)
- Anthony LaMarchina – cello (10, 11, 13)
- Sarighani Reist – cello (10, 11, 13)
- Monisa Angell – viola (10, 11, 13)
- Kristin Wilkinson – viola (10, 11, 13)
- David Angell – violin (10, 11, 13)
- Wei Tsun Chang – violin (10, 11, 13)
- David Davidson – violin (10, 11, 13)
- Alicia Enstrom – violin (10, 11, 13)
- Tony Lindsay – backing vocals (7, 9, 11)
- Conesha Monét Owens – backing vocals (7, 9, 11)
- Fred Ross – backing vocals (7, 9, 11)
- Lucinda Williams – lead and harmony vocals (12)

=== Production ===
- Steve Jordan – producer, mixing (1)
- Niko Bolas – engineer, mixing (2–13)
- Dave O'Donnell – mixing (1)
- Michael Rodriguez – additional engineer
- Chris Taberez – additional engineer, mixing (14, 15)
- Sean Badum – assistant engineer
- Diego Ruelas – assistant engineer
- Bernie Grundman – mastering
- Jeri Heiden – art direction, design
- Nick Steinhardt – art direction, design
- Danny Clinch – photography

Studios

- Recorded at Blackbird Studio (Nashville, Tennessee) and The Barn (Napa Valley, California).
- Mixed at Capitol Studios (Hollywood, California).
- Mastered at Bernie Grundman Mastering (Hollywood, California).
