= Green Onions =

1962 instrumental composition by Booker T. & the M.G.'s

- Cover of the 1962 US single

Single by Booker T. & the M.G.'s

from the album Green Onions
- B-side: "Behave Yourself"
- Released: July 1962
- Recorded: June 1962, Memphis, Tennessee
- Genre: Instrumental rock; soul; R&B
- Length: 2:52
- Label: Stax
- Songwriters: Booker T. Jones; Steve Cropper; Lewie Steinberg; Al Jackson Jr.
- Producers: Booker T. Jones; Steve Cropper; Lewie Steinberg; Al Jackson Jr.

Booker T. & the M.G.'s singles chronology
"Green Onions" (1962)	"Jellybread" (1962)

Official audio
- "Green Onions" on YouTube

"Green Onions" is an instrumental composition recorded in 1962 by Booker T. & the M.G.'s. One of the most popular rock and soul songs, and one of the best-known R&B instrumentals of its era, it utilizes a twelve-bar blues progression and features a rippling Hammond M3 organ line played by frontman Booker T. Jones, who created it when he was 17 by improvising in the studio.

The track was originally issued on the Volt label (a subsidiary of Stax Records) as the B-side of "Behave Yourself" on Volt 102; it was quickly reissued as the A-side of Stax 127, and it also appeared on the album of the same name that same year. The organ sound of the song became a feature of the "Memphis soul sound".

== Background ==
Booker T. Jones was the keyboard player for the house band of Stax Records with Al Jackson on drums, Lewie Steinberg on bass, and Steve Cropper on guitar. They started jamming in the studio one Sunday when a recording session with another singer, Billy Lee Riley, failed to take place. They played around with a piano groove that Jones had performed in clubs before, although Jones decided to use a Hammond organ because he thought it sounded better on the tune. The owner of Stax, Jim Stewart, became interested in recording the resulting tune, "Behave Yourself". However, the band needed a B-side for this song. Using a riff with a twelve-bar blues bassline that Jones had, the band came up with a song that became "Green Onions". Cropper used a Fender Telecaster on "Green Onions", as he did on all of the M.G.'s instrumentals.

After recording, Cropper contacted Scotty Moore at Sun Records to cut a record. He then took the record to a DJ on the Memphis station WLOK, who played "Green Onions" on air. Due to positive reaction of the public to the song, it was quickly re-released as an A-side.

According to Booker T. Jones the composition was originally to be called "Funky Onions" but Estelle Axton, Stax co-owner and Jim Stewart's sister, thought it "sounded like a cuss word"; it was therefore renamed "Green Onions". According to Cropper, the title is not a marijuana reference; rather, the track is named after a cat named Green Onions, whose way of walking inspired the riff. On a broadcast of the radio program Wait Wait... Don't Tell Me! on June 24, 2013, Jones was asked about the title and said, "The bass player thought it was so funky, he wanted to call it 'Funky Onions', but they thought that was too low-class, so we used 'Green Onions' instead."

== Personnel ==
- Booker T. Jones – Hammond M3 organ
- Steve Cropper – electric guitar
- Lewie Steinberg – bass guitar
- Al Jackson Jr. – drums

== Single track listings ==
Name	Location	Format	Record label	Release date
"Behave Yourself" b/w "Green Onions"	US/UK	7" 45 rpm	Volt Records (US)	May 1962
"Green Onions" b/w "Behave Yourself"	US/UK	7" 45 rpm	Stax Records (US)/London Records (UK)	September 1962
"Green Onions" b/w "Boot-Leg"	United Kingdom	7" 45 rpm	Atlantic Records	March 1967

== Chart performance ==
"Green Onions" entered the Billboard Hot 100 the week ending August 11, 1962, and peaked at No. 3 the week ending September 29, 1962. The single also made it to No. 1 on the R&B singles chart, for four non-consecutive weeks, an unusual occurrence in that it fell in and out of top spot three times. It first appeared on the UK Singles Chart on December 15, 1979, following its use in the film Quadrophenia; it peaked at No. 7 on January 26, 1980, and stayed on the chart for twelve weeks.

=== Weekly charts ===
Chart (1962)	Peak position
Australia (Kent Music Report)	73
Canada (CHUM)	25
US Billboard Hot 100	3
US Billboard Hot R&B Sides	1
US Cash Box	3

Chart (1980)	Peak position
Ireland (IRMA)	9
UK Singles (Official Charts)	7

=== Year-end charts ===
Chart (1962)	Rank
US Billboard Hot 100	53
US Cash Box	34

== Certifications ==
Certifications for "Green Onions"
Region	Certification	Certified units/sales
United Kingdom (BPI)	Gold	400,000^{‡}
United States (RIAA)	Gold	1,000,000^{^}
^{^} Shipments figures based on certification alone.^{‡} Sales+streaming figures based on certification alone.

== Other recordings ==
In 1969, "Green Onions" was covered by Dick Hyman on his album The Age of Electronicus; his version peaked at No. 87 on the Canadian singles charts.

The song was sampled for Maxi Priest and Shaggy's 1996 recording of "That Girl" from Priest's album Man with the Fun.

== Similar recordings ==
Booker T. & the M.G.'s released a follow-up to "Green Onions", titled "Mo' Onions", on the album Green Onions in November 1962, and as a single released in February 1964. It reached No. 97 on both the R&B singles and Billboard Hot 100 charts.

Sonny Boy Williamson's 1963 recording "Help Me" was based on "Green Onions".

== Legacy ==
"Green Onions" was ranked No. 181 by Rolling Stone in its original list of the 500 greatest songs of all time; it was the only instrumental in the list. When the magazine released a 2021 revision of the list, the song was repositioned to number 418, and was no longer the list's sole instrumental song.

In 1999, "Green Onions" was given a Grammy Hall of Fame Award.

It was voted number 5 in the All-Time Top 100 Singles from Colin Larkin's All Time Top 1000 Albums. Larkin stated the song was "an incredible, unrepeatable piece of music, copied by millions but never remotely challenged".

In 2012, as part of the album it was featured on, it was added to the National Recording Registry of the Library of Congress, a list of "culturally, historically, or aesthetically important" American sound recordings.

"Green Onions" was inducted into the Blues Hall of Fame in 2018, as one of the five new entrants in the "Classic of Blues Recording (Song)" category.

It was featured on the soundtrack of the 1993 film The Sandlot and the soundtrack for the 2004 video game Grand Theft Auto: San Andreas.

== See also ==
- List of number-one R&B singles of 1962 (U.S.)
