= Detour (Boz Scaggs album) =

Studio album by Boz Scaggs
- Released: October 17, 2025
- Studio: Davlen Sound Studios (North Hollywood, California); Hollywood Sound Recorders (Hollywood, California)
- Genre: Jazz; blues; soul
- Length: 48:45
- Label: Concord Records
- Producer: Boz Scaggs; Michael Rodriguez

Boz Scaggs chronology
Out of the Blues (2018)	Detour (2025)

Professional ratings
Review scores
Source	Rating
AllMusic	3.5/5 stars
The Arts Desk	4/5 stars
Cryptic Rock	4.5/5 stars

Detour is the twentieth studio album by American singer-songwriter Boz Scaggs. It was released on October 17, 2025, on Concord Records, and serves as the follow-up to Out of the Blues (2018). The album is Scaggs' first studio album in seven years, and contains covers of songs by musicians including Frank Sinatra, Ella Fitzgerald, Irma Thomas, and Lonnie Johnson, as well as a re-recording of "I'll Be Long Gone" from Scaggs' self-titled second album. The album peaked at No. 15 on the Billboard Top Jazz Albums Chart.

== Reception ==
Thom Jurek of AllMusic says the album "is easily Scaggs' definitive standards outing." He states that "the songs deliberately lean into his changing, yet still phenomenal voice and iconic phrasing." Mark Kidel of The Arts Desk praises Scaggs' voice on the album, describing it as "matured – like the best wine (Boz ran a vineyard in Napa for a while), without losing any of its musicality and control." Garrett Richardello of Cryptic Rock says Detour is "a testament to the artistry of subtle interpretation." He then says the album is "not only a collection of standards; it is a map of where Scaggs is now, and perhaps where his future lies."

== Track listing ==
No.	Title	Writer(s)	Length
1.	"It's Raining"	Naomi Neville	4:28
2.	"Angel Eyes"	Earl K. Brent; Matt Dennis	4:46
3.	"Once I Loved"	Antônio Carlos Jobim; Vinícius de Moraes; Ray Gilbert	3:53
4.	"The Very Thought of You"	Ray Noble	5:10
5.	"I'll Be Long Gone"	Boz Scaggs	4:47
6.	"Detour Ahead"	Herb Ellis; Johnny Frigo; Lou Carter	5:24
7.	"I Could Have Told You"	Carl Sigman; Jimmy Van Heusen	4:40
8.	"The Meaning of the Blues"	Bobby Troup; Leah Worth	3:56
9.	"Tomorrow Night"	Sam Coslow; Will Grosz	4:27
10.	"Too Late Now"	Alan Jay Lerner; Burton Lane	3:47
11.	"We'll Be Together Again"	Carl T. Fischer; Frankie Laine	3:23
Total length:			48:45

== Personnel ==
- Boz Scaggs – vocals, guitar
- Seth Asarnow – piano, bass guitar, arrangement
- Jason Lewis – drums
- Jeremy Cohen – violin, viola
- Jim Cox – string arrangement

=== Production ===
- Boz Scaggs – producer
- Michael Rodriguez – producer
- Chris Tabarez – executive producer
- David Luke – engineer
- Adam Muñoz – mixing
- Ken Lee – mastering

== Charts ==
Chart (2025)	Peak position
US Billboard Top Jazz Albums	15
