= Jerry Beach =

American songwriter

- Born: December 11, 1941
- Died: January 10, 2016 (aged 74)
- Occupation: Blues musician

Jerry Marlon Beach (December 11, 1941 – January 10, 2016) was an American blues musician. His father was stationed with the U.S. Army Air Corps in Oklahoma City. He spent his first two years of high school in London where he learned how to play guitar before he and his family settled in Bossier City, Louisiana.

Beach graduated from Bossier High School in 1960, and briefly attended Northwestern State University, but by then he was sitting in with local bands playing guitar and singing. By the mid-1960s, he and Danny Harrelson were headlining local clubs as "Danny and Jerry". He was a favorite on regional music scenes for 56 years in several bands such as: "Jerry Beach Band" or "Robin and the Bluebirds".

He was inducted to the Louisiana Hall of Fame in 1998, but his international fame resulted from his songwriting. In 1972, the late Albert King recorded Beach's "I'll Play the Blues for You", which became a No. 1 US Billboard R&B chart hit and has been covered by many artists. He also was nominated for a Grammy Award for the song.

He was preceded in death in January 2016, by his parents, two brothers, and mother in law. He is survived by his daughter Robin, his former wife Sandy Beach, and two brothers.
