= Packy Axton =

American musician (1941–1974)

- Axton (left) with Don Nix and Steve Cropper in Memphis, c. 1961

Background information
- Birth name: Charles Everett Axton
- Born: February 17, 1941; Memphis, Tennessee, U.S.
- Died: January 20, 1974 (aged 32); Memphis, Tennessee, U.S.
- Occupation: Musician
- Instrument: Saxophone
- Years active: 1959–1973
- Formerly of: The Mar-Keys; The Packers
- Relatives: Estelle Axton (mother); Jim Stewart (uncle)

Charles Everett "Packy" Axton (February 17, 1941 – January 20, 1974) was an American rhythm and blues tenor saxophone player and bandleader, who was a member of the Mar-Keys and later the Packers.

== Early life ==
Charles Everett "Packy" Axton was born in Memphis, Tennessee, the son of Everett and Estelle Axton. Estelle Axton and her brother, Jim Stewart, were the founders of Stax Records. He graduated from Messick High School in 1959.

== Career ==
By 1959, Packy Axton had become a member of the Royal Spades, a group formed by Steve Cropper, Donald "Duck" Dunn, Charlie Freeman and Terry Johnson, which expanded to include a horn section composed of Axton, Don Nix, and Wayne Jackson. In 1961, they renamed themselves the Mar-Keys and had a major hit with "Last Night" (number 3 on the Billboard Hot 100, number 2 on the R&B chart). Axton, Cropper and Jackson were the only members of the band to perform on the record; the other parts were played by session musicians.

The Mar-Keys quickly fractured into what were effectively two separate groups; the Mar-Keys that continued to record in the studio and release material on Stax were often a completely different set of musicians to the Mar-Keys who played live gigs. After Cropper left the live band in 1961, soon followed by Dunn, Axton became the effective leader of the live Mar-Keys. He also worked as a session musician at Stax, working with the studio Mar-Keys (including Cropper and Dunn) on an irregular basis. Axton left Memphis—effectively severing his relationship with the Mar-Keys—in 1965 to live in Los Angeles, reportedly after a series of disagreements with Jim Stewart.

Later in 1965, the Stax Revue performed in Los Angeles, and radio disc jockey Magnificent Montague persuaded Axton to record there with Cropper, Booker T. Jones and Al Jackson, all of Booker T. & the M.G.'s. They recorded an instrumental track together, "Hole in the Wall", which Montague then released as by the Packers; it reached number 43 on the pop chart and number 5 on the R&B chart. Axton formed a pickup group to promote the record.

Axton later returned to Memphis. In 1966/67, he was a member of the Pac-Keys, an instrumental group which released two singles. The first, "Stone Fox", saw some regional chart action, but neither single charted nationally. After 1967, Axton ran the Satellite Record Shop in Memphis, occasionally performing with musicians such as Charlie Rich.

== Personal life and death ==
Axton had one son, Charles Everett Jr. Axton died at St. Joseph's Hospital in Memphis on January 20, 1974, at the age of 32. The cause of death was cirrhosis. He was buried at the Forest Hill Cemetery in Memphis.
