= Years Gone By =

Studio album by Albert King
- Released: May 1969
- Recorded: February 1969
- Genre: Blues
- Length: 33:36
- Label: Stax
- Producer: Al Jackson, Jr.

Albert King chronology
Live Wire/Blues Power (1968)	Years Gone By (1969)	King of the Blues Guitar (1969)

Professional ratings
Review scores
Source	Rating
AllMusic	4.5/5 stars
The Penguin Guide to Blues Recordings	2.5/4 stars
The Rolling Stone Album Guide	4/5 stars

Years Gone By is the third studio album by Albert King, released by Stax Records in 1969. In the same year, the album reached number 46 on Billboard R&B Albums chart and number 133 on Billboard 200.

== Critical reception ==
In AllMusic, Cub Koda said: "King cranked out this solid, if typical, album for the Stax label after the success of Born Under a Bad Sign. With Booker T. & the M.G.'s drummer Al Jackson Jr. producing, the set includes such staples as "You Threw Your Love on Me Too Strong," "Wrapped up in Love Again," and a powerful version of Howlin' Wolf's "Killing Floor." For fans of King's guitar work, the inclusion of the instrumental workouts on "You Don't Love Me" and "Drowning on Dry Land" are a special bonus. Not an essential Albert King album, but one of his good ones."

== Track listing ==
1. "Wrapped Up in Love Again" (Albert King) – 2:18
2. "You Don't Love Me" (instrumental) (Willie Cobbs) – 3:28
3. "Cockroach" (Bettye Crutcher, Deanie Parker) – 3:18
4. "Killing Floor" (Chester Burnett) – 3:05
5. "Lonely Man" (Milton Campbell, Bob Lyons) – 2:39
6. "If the Washing Don't Get You, The Rinsing Will" (Homer Banks, James Cross, Allen Jones) – 2:12
7. "Drownin' on Dry Land" (Mickey Gregory, Allen Jones) – 3:54
8. "Drownin' on Dry Land" (instrumental) (Mickey Gregory, Allen Jones) – 2:38
9. "Heart Fixing Business" (Homer Banks, Allen Jones) – 2:41
10. "You Threw Your Love on Me Too Strong" (Albert King) – 3:14
11. "Sky Is Crying" (Elmore James, Morgan Robinson) – 4:09

== Personnel ==
- Albert King – lead guitar, vocals
- Booker T. Jones – keyboards, piano, organ
- Steve Cropper – rhythm guitar
- Donald Dunn – bass guitar
- Al Jackson Jr. – drums, arrangements

Technical

- Ron Capone – recording engineer
- Honeya Thompson – art direction
- Don Paulsen – cover photography
