= Ben Cauley =

American musician (1947–2015)

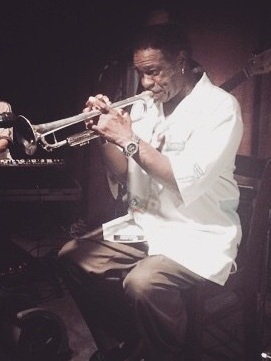
- Cauley performing in 2015

Background information
- Born: Ben Cauley Jr. October 3, 1947; Memphis, Tennessee, U.S.
- Died: September 21, 2015 (aged 67) Memphis, Tennessee, U.S.
- Genres: Soul, funk, R&B
- Occupations: Musician, songwriter, arranger
- Instrument: Trumpet
- Years active: 1960s–2015
- Label: Stax
- Formerly of: The Bar-Kays; The Bo-Keys

Ben Cauley Jr. (October 3, 1947 – September 21, 2015) was an American trumpet player, vocalist, songwriter, and founding member of the Stax recording group the Bar-Kays. He was the only survivor of the 1967 plane crash that killed soul singer Otis Redding and four members of the Bar-Kays.

== Early years ==
Cauley was born in South Memphis, Tennessee. He learned to play trumpet when at school, and formed a band with guitarist Jimmy King, saxophonist Phalon Jones, drummer Carl Cunningham, keyboardist Ronnie Caldwell, and bassist James Alexander. The group was originally named the Imperials, and later changed to the Bar-Kays in the mid-1960s. Cauley started attending LeMoyne College in 1965, before becoming a professional musician.

== The Bar-Kays ==
The Bar-Kays joined the Stax studio by 1966, and were signed on to Stax's subsidiary Volt Records in the beginning of 1967. Al Jackson Jr., the drummer with Booker T & the MGs, took a particular interest in the young members of the Bar-Kays and groomed them to become the second house band for Stax after Booker T and the MGs. As such they appeared as the backing band on numerous recordings for Stax artists such as Otis Redding, Carla Thomas, and Sam and Dave. In fact, Otis Redding took such a liking to the band that he chose them to be his touring back-up band in the summer of 1967.

== Plane crash ==
On December 8, 1967, Otis Redding and the Bar-Kays flew in Redding's twin engine Beechcraft H18 plane to Nashville, Tennessee, for three weekend gigs. The following day, December 9, they took the Beechcraft to Cleveland, where they appeared on Don Webster's Upbeat TV show with Mitch Ryder and the Detroit Wheels.

On December 10, on their commute to Madison, Wisconsin, at 3:28 p.m., the plane, which carried Otis Redding, his partner, and the majority of the Bar-Kays, crashed into Wiicawak Bay (then known as Squaw Bay) in Lake Monona, on the outskirts of Madison. Bar-Kays bassist James Alexander had taken a different flight, as there was not enough room left on Redding's plane. Cauley, who was sitting directly behind Otis Redding in the co-pilot's seat, had fallen asleep on the flight clutching his seat cushion. He awoke when he realized he could not breathe. He said that he then saw bandmate Phalon Jones look out of a window and say "Oh, no!"

Cauley unbuckled his safety belt, which ultimately allowed him to separate himself from the wreckage. Other victims, including Redding, were found still in their seats. According to Jet magazine, which interviewed Cauley and the authorities who assisted in the rescue attempt, the rescue divers could not be in the water for more than 15 minutes at a time due to the freezing temperature of the water. Madison Police Inspector John Harrington was quoted as saying that a person without insulated SCUBA gear "wouldn't live longer than 20 or so minutes" in the icy water.

== After the crash ==
Ben Cauley and James Alexander reformed the Bar-Kays and went on to record with Stax artists such as Isaac Hayes, Rufus Thomas and the Staple Singers, as well as appear at Wattstax, "The Black Woodstock". However, the band made little money, as they did not have much work outside of being a house band for Stax, and frequently needed to tour with the artists they backed. Ben Cauley had two young daughters to support, and he left the group in 1971.

Cauley suffered a debilitating stroke in 1989, but eventually fully recovered, aside from occasional problems with slightly slurred speech and he performed with the choir of Calvary Longview United Methodist Church.

Into the 2000s, Cauley could be heard backing up Liz Lottmann, jazz and blues singer, or performing live at the Memphis club Rum Boogie, located downtown on Beale Street.

On September 9, 2008, Attorney B.J. Wade donated $100,000 to Stax Records that would be used to create the Ben Cauley scholarship, in his honor and to shed light on his accomplishments. On September 12, 2008, the scholarship was founded. On June 6, 2015, Cauley was on hand to be inducted into the Official Rhythm & Blues Music Hall of Fame in Clarksdale, Mississippi, along with the other Bar-Kays.

== Death ==
Cauley died on September 21, 2015, at the age of 67.

== Discography ==
- The Wicked Pickett - Wilson Pickett (1967)
- Boz Scaggs - Boz Scaggs (1969)
- Do the Funky Chicken - Rufus Thomas (1970)
- Candi Staton - Candi Staton (1972)
- 7-Tease - Donovan (1974)
- Two the Hard Way - Gregg Allman, Cher (1977)
- Love Me Tender - B.B. King (1982)
- Levon Helm - Levon Helm (1982)
- Intimate Storm - Shirley Brown (1984)
- Street Language - Rodney Crowell (1986)
- Talk Is Cheap - Keith Richards (1988)
- Red House - Albert King (1991)
- Come On Home - Boz Scaggs (1997)
- Memphis - Boz Scaggs (2013)
- Crosseyed Heart - Keith Richards (2015)
- A Fool to Care - Boz Scaggs (2015)

== See also ==
- Isaac Hayes
- Stax Records
