= Doin' Our Thing =

Studio album by Booker T & the M.G.'s
- Released: February 23, 1968
- Recorded: November 24, 1967 and February 2, 1968
- Studio: Stax, Memphis
- Genre: Southern soul, instrumental rock
- Length: 36:43
- Label: Stax/Atlantic
- Producer: Booker T. & the M.G.'s

Booker T & the M.G.'s chronology
Back to Back (1967)	Doin' Our Thing (1968)	Soul Limbo (1968)

Professional ratings
Review scores
Source	Rating
AllMusic	3/5 stars

Doin' Our Thing is the sixth studio album by R&B band Booker T. & the M.G.'s, released in April 1968. The album was their first self-produced effort and charted at number 176 on the Billboard Top LPs chart.

== Track listing ==
Side 1

1. "I Can Dig It" (Cropper, Dunn, Jones, Jackson) – 2:42
2. "Expressway (to Your Heart)" (Kenny Gamble, Leon Huff) – 3:05
3. "Doin' Our Thing" (Cropper, Dunn, Jones, Jackson) – 4:01
4. "You Don't Love Me" (Willie Cobbs) – 2:49
5. "Never My Love" (Don Addrisi) – 2:47
6. "The Exodus Song" (Ernest Gold) – 2:38

Side 2

1. "The Beat Goes On" (Sonny Bono) – 2:39
2. "Ode to Billie Joe" (Bobbie Gentry) – 4:02
3. "Blue on Green" (Cropper, Dunn, Jones, Jackson) – 2:28
4. "You Keep Me Hanging On" (Lamont Dozier, Eddie Holland, Brian Holland) – 4:50
5. "Let's Go Get Stoned" (Nickolas Ashford, Valerie Simpson, Josephine Armstead) – 2:54

== Personnel ==
Booker T. & the M.G.s

- Booker T. Jones – Hammond organ, guitar, clavinet, piano
- Steve Cropper – guitar
- Donald Dunn – bass guitar
- Al Jackson Jr. – drums, percussion

Technical

- Loring Eutemey – design
- Dan Hersch – digital remastering
- Peter Hujar – photography
- Bill Inglot – digital remastering
- Peter Jujar – photography
- Bill Kington – photography
- The M.G.'s – supervision (producer)

== Charts ==
Chart (1968)	Peak position
US Billboard Top LPs	176
