= Ronnie Caldwell =

- Born: December 27, 1948
- Died: December 10, 1967 (aged 18)
- Formerly of: Bar-Kays

Ronald Louis Caldwell (December 27, 1948 – December 10, 1967) was an American soul and R&B musician.

A keyboard player, Caldwell was the only white member of the Bar-Kays musical group based in Memphis, Tennessee. The group recorded with and also accompanied singer Otis Redding. According to James Alexander, Caldwell was fully accepted within Memphis' African-American community, to the point that Caldwell felt free to go about in public with his African-American girlfriend, despite the attitude of racial segregation prevalent at that time.

Caldwell died two weeks before his 19th birthday, on December 10, 1967, in a plane crash in Lake Monona with Redding and three other band members (Phalon Jones, Carl Cunningham and Jimmie King), their valet Matthew Kelly, and the pilot Richard Fraser while on their way to a performance in Madison, Wisconsin.

Caldwell is interred in the Memorial Park Cemetery in Memphis.
