= Don Nix =

American musician and songwriter (1941–2024)

- Nix, c. 1970s

Background information
- Born: William Donald Nix; September 27, 1941; Memphis, Tennessee, U.S.
- Died: December 31, 2024 (aged 83) Germantown, Tennessee, U.S.
- Genres: Memphis soul; blues; rock
- Occupations: Musician; songwriter; producer
- Instruments: Guitar; vocals; saxophone
- Years active: 1958–2008
- Formerly of: The Mar-Keys

William Donald Nix (September 27, 1941 – December 31, 2024) was an American musician, songwriter, and producer. Nix, who was best known for his song "Going Down," was described by AllMusic as "one of the more obscure figures in Southern soul and rock."

== Biography ==
William Donald Nix was born into a musical family in Memphis, Tennessee, on September 27, 1941. His brother Larry became a mastering engineer for Stax Records and for the Ardent Studios in Memphis. Nix began his career playing saxophone for the Memphis-based Mar-Keys, alongside Steve Cropper and Duck Dunn. The group scored a hit single with "Last Night" in 1961. After leaving the Mar-Keys, Nix worked as a session musician for Stax.

After relocating to Los Angeles in the mid-1960s, Nix worked as a producer and songwriter with such acts as Leon Russell, Gary Lewis and the Playboys, John Mayall and the Bluesbreakers, and Freddie King, among others. Nix's best known composition, "Going Down," was originally released by the band Moloch on their eponymous album (Enterprise ENS-1002) in 1969, and has become a blues-rock standard, having been covered by Freddie King, JJ Cale, the Jeff Beck Group, the Who, the Rolling Stones, and Pearl Jam. In 1971, Nix made the acquaintance of George Harrison, leading to Nix organizing the backup vocalists for the Concert for Bangladesh.

As a solo artist, Nix released ten albums between 1970 and 2008, and published three books.

Nix died at his home in Germantown, Tennessee, on December 31, 2024, at the age of 83.

== Discography ==
- In God We Trust (Shelter, 1970)
- Living by the Days (Elektra, 1971)
- The Alabama State Troupers Road Show (Elektra, 1972)
- Hobos, Heroes and Street Corner Clowns (Enterprise, 1973)
- Gone Too Long (Cream, 1976)
- Skyrider (Cream, 1979)
- Back to the Well (Appaloosa, 1993)
- Goin' Down: The Songs of Don Nix (Evidence, 2002)
- I Don't Want No Trouble! (Section Eight, 2006)
- Passing Through (Section Eight, 2008)

== Bibliography ==
- Road Stories and Recipes (1997), Schirmer Books/Simon & Schuster, New York. ISBN 0-02-864621-5
- Who's That with Don Nix? – A photojournal of Don Nix's personal experiences.
- Memphis Man: Living High, Laying Low (1997, 2015) Sartoris Literary Group, Jackson, Mississippi. ISBN 978-1-941644-39-3
