= Last Night (Mar-Keys composition) =

Single by The Mar-Keys

from the album Last Night!
- B-side: "Night Before"
- Released: June 1961
- Genre: R&B, instrumental rock
- Length: 2:35
- Label: Satellite; 107
- Songwriters: Charles Axton; Jerry Lee Smith; Floyd Newman; Chips Moman; Gilbert C. Caple

"Last Night" is an instrumental recorded by The Mar-Keys. Released in 1961, the track appeared on Last Night!, the first LP released by the Stax label.

== Background ==
The label of the single gives writing credit simply to "Mar-Keys"; it was registered with BMI as having been written by Charles Axton, Floyd Newman, Gilbert C. Caple, Jerry Lee Smith and Chips Moman.

The song is in a twelve-bar blues form, with brief stops, where Floyd Newman intones "Last Night" before his saxophone solo, which is followed by him exclaiming "Oh, yeah!" before the last three choruses, including the pauses, before the song's fade.

According to Steve Cropper, in an interview with Paul Nassari of the Sunday Mail newspaper, in Adelaide, Australia, "Jerry Lee ‘Smoochy’ Smith came up with the piano riff that was played on organ. Since [producer Chips] Moman didn't want a guitar on it for whatever reason, I wound up playing the hold-down on the organ on the root note. It hurts me in the Mar-Keys history when people say I wasn’t in the Mar-Keys because there’s no guitar on Last Night but I have to differ with them."

== Chart performance ==
"Last Night" reached #3 Pop and #2 in the R&B charts in the United States. In Canada, the song reached #21 on the CHUM Charts.

== Cover versions ==
- The Ventures released their take on the 1963 Dolton Records album The Ventures Play Telstar and the Lonely Bull, BST 8019.
- The tune was covered by Georgie Fame on his 1966 Sweet Things album.
- Laurel Aitken & The Soulmen issued a 45 rpm single version in 1966.
- Ace Cannon opened his 1967 album Memphis Golden Hits with his version.
- King Curtis covered the song on his 1967 album King Curtis Plays the Great Memphis Hits.
- Screamin' Jay Hawkins released a risqué rendering titled "Bite it" on his record Because Is in Your Mind in 1970.

== Samples ==
- The tune was sampled in 'Last Night' by Chris Anderson and DJ Robbie, and featured on their 7 versions album of the same name which also features a bonus track named Baby Come On.
- Multiple elements from the track were heavily borrowed in the Duffy's 2008 worldwide hit "Mercy".

Also was used in the Ken Burns "Baseball" ten part PBS Series, 1994

== Use in films, radio and television programs ==
- During the 1960s, "Last Night" became the title tune for the French radio show Salut les Copains on Europe 1.
- The music was used during telecasts of the NBA on CBS in the 1970s (roughly around 1975–76) as the play-by-play announcer gave a preview to the featured game.
- The tune was covered by the jazz ensemble The Bum Notes for the closing credits of the BBC sitcom Bottom in the early 1990s.
- It was also used as the backing music to "Viaduct", a game played on the Chris Moyles radio show.
- It is the theme tune to "The Midweek Special", a weekly show on Hospital Radio DGH in Eastbourne, England.
- KNOE TV-8 in Monroe, Louisiana once utilized the tune as the theme music for the weekly program ‘’Sportscope’’.
- It featured in the 1988 Keanu Reeves film The Night Before.
- It appeared in the 1998 film Blues Brothers 2000, re-recorded by the Blues Brothers Band, and during the closing credits of the 2007 film Rush Hour 3.
- The music was used in the legal comedy-drama Ally McBeal (1999, episode "Sideshow", second season).
- The music was used in the Netflix and Aardman Animated movie ‘’Chicken Run: Dawn of the Nugget’’.
