= Phalon Jones =

American soul and R&B musician

Phalon R. Jones, Jr. (January 1, 1948 – December 10, 1967) was an American soul and R&B musician. He was a saxophonist for musical group the Bar-Kays, which recorded with and also played backup for Otis Redding. Jones and three other members of the Bar-Kays (Ronnie Caldwell, Carl Cunningham, and Jimmie King), their valet Matthew Kelly, and the pilot Richard Fraser, died along with Redding in a plane crash in Lake Monona while on their way to a performance in Madison, Wisconsin.

== Death ==
Ben Cauley, Jones' bandmate in the Bar-Kays, was the sole survivor of the accident. Cauley reported that he had been asleep until just seconds before impact, and recalled that upon waking he observed Jones look out a window and say, "Oh, no!" Cauley said that he then unbuckled his seat belt, and that was his final recollection before finding himself in the frigid waters of the lake, grasping a seat cushion to keep himself afloat. The specific cause of the crash was never determined. Jones was buried in the New Park Cemetery in Memphis, Tennessee.

Noted hip-hop and R&B producer Phalon "Jazze Pha" Alexander, who is James Alexander's son, is named after Jones.
