= Lewie Steinberg =

American musician (1933–2016)

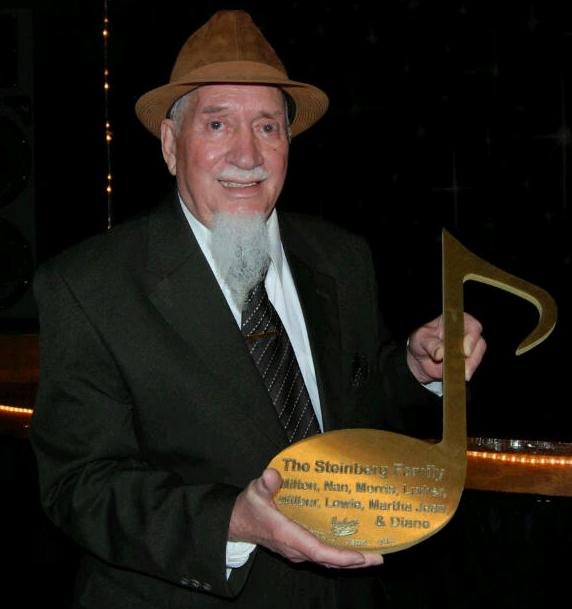
- Lewie Steinberg in November 2010

Background information
- Born: Lewie Polk Steinberg; September 13, 1933; Memphis, Tennessee, U.S.
- Died: July 21, 2016 (aged 82) Memphis, Tennessee, U.S.
- Genres: Soul, R&B, Memphis soul
- Occupation: Musician
- Instrument: Bass guitar
- Formerly of: Booker T. & the M.G.'s

Lewie Polk Steinberg (Note: Steinberg's given name was often recorded incorrectly as "Lewis" or "Louis.") (September 13, 1933 – July 21, 2016) was an American musician best known as the original bass guitar player for the soul music group Booker T. & the M.G.'s.

== Biography ==
=== Early life ===
Steinberg was born in Memphis, Tennessee to Baptist parents.

=== Booker T. & the M.G.'s ===
He joined Booker T. & the MG's in 1962. He was featured on "Green Onions" and its B-side, "Behave Yourself", as well as the albums Green Onions and Soul Dressing. Steinberg left the group in 1965 and was replaced by Donald "Duck" Dunn.

Steinberg was inducted into the Rock and Roll Hall of Fame in 1992, as a member of Booker T. & the M.G.'s.

=== Personal life ===
Steinberg received a Grammy Lifetime Achievement Award in 2007. Steinberg died from cancer on July 21, 2016, in Memphis, at the age of 82.

== Discography ==
=== With Booker T. & the M.G.'s ===
==== Studio albums ====
| Year | Album |
|---|---|
| 1962 | Green Onions |
| 1965 | Soul Dressing |

==== Singles ====
| Year | A-side | B-side | Label | Album |
|---|---|---|---|---|
| 1962 | "Green Onions" | "Behave Yourself" | Volt 102; Stax 127 | Green Onions |
| 1962 | "Jellybread" | "Aw' Mercy" | Stax 131 | Soul Dressing |
| 1963 | "Home Grown" | "Big Train" | Stax 134 | Soul Dressing |
| 1963 | "Chinese Checkers" | "Plum Nellie" | Stax 137 | Soul Dressing |
| 1963 | "Mo' Onions" | "Fannie Mae" | Stax 142 | Green Onions |
| 1964 | "Tic-Tac-Toe" | "Mo' Onions" | Stax 142 | Soul Dressing |
| 1964 | "Soul Dressing" | "MG Party" | Stax 153 | Soul Dressing |
| 1964 | "Can't Be Still" | "Terrible Thing" | Stax 161 | Soul Dressing |
