= Bar-Kays =

American funk band

The Bar-Kays
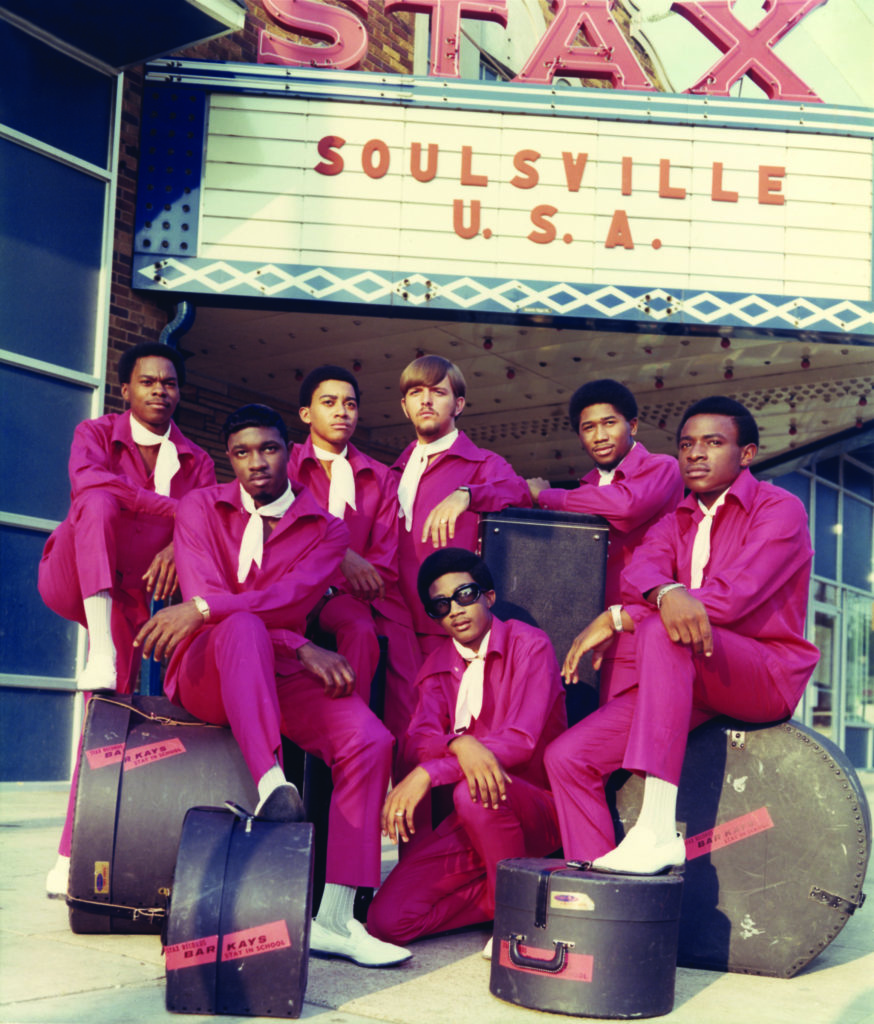
- The Bar-Kays in 1968

Background information
- Origin: Memphis, Tennessee, U.S.
- Genres: Funk; R&B; soul; funk rock; psychedelic soul; disco
- Years active: 1964–1989; 1991–present
- Labels: Stax; Mercury; Rhino; Island
- Members: James Alexander; Chris J; Carlos Sargent; Ez Roc; Bo Dae; Angelo Earl; Darryl Sanford; Devin Crutcher; Katrina Anderson
- Past members: Larry Dodson; Ben Cauley; Ronnie Caldwell; Carl Cunningham; Phalon Jones; Jimmy King; Marcus Price; Vernon Burch; Ronnie Gorden; Michael Toles; Winston Stewart; Charles "Scoops" Allen; Alvin Hunter; Barry Wilkins; Lloyd Smith; Dywane Thomas; Mike Beard; Frank Thompson; Sherman Guy; Larry "LJ" Johnson; Harvey Henderson; Tony Gentry; Archie Love; Bryan Smith; Carl Sims; Daroll Hagen; Mark Bynum

The Bar-Kays is an American funk band formed in 1964. The band had dozens of charting singles from the 1960s to the 1980s, including "Soul Finger" (US Billboard Hot 100 number 17, R&B number 3) in 1967, "Son of Shaft" (R&B number 10) in 1972, and "Boogie Body Land" (R&B number 7) in 1980. The Bar-Kays also served as the backing band for a variety of singers, including Isaac Hayes and Otis Redding.

== History ==
=== Black rock years ===
The Bar-Kays began in Memphis, Tennessee, as a studio session group, backing major artists at Stax Records. In 1967, they were chosen by Otis Redding to play as his backing band, and were tutored for that role by Al Jackson, Jr., Booker T. Jones, and the other members of Booker T. & the M.G.'s. Their first single, "Soul Finger", was issued on April 14, 1967, reaching number 3 on the US Billboard R&B Singles chart and number 17 on the Billboard Hot 100.

On December 10, 1967, Redding and four members of the band—Jimmie King (born June 8, 1949; guitar), Ronnie Caldwell (born December 27, 1948; electric organ), Phalon Jones (born 1948; saxophone), and Carl Cunningham (born 1948; drums)—and their valet, Matthew Kelly, died when their airplane crashed into Lake Monona, near Madison, Wisconsin, while attempting to land at Truax Field. Redding and the band were scheduled to play their next concerts in Madison. Trumpeter Ben Cauley was the only survivor of the crash. Bassist James Alexander was on another plane, as the plane carrying Redding held only seven passengers. Cauley and Alexander rebuilt the group.

The re-formed band consisted of Cauley; Alexander; Harvey Henderson, saxophone; Michael Toles, guitar; Ronnie Gorden, organ; Willie Hall, drums; and later Larry Dodson (formerly of fellow Stax act the Temprees), lead vocals. The group backed dozens of major Stax artists on recordings, including Isaac Hayes on his album Hot Buttered Soul.

Cauley left the group in 1971, leaving Alexander, Dodson (vocals, vibes), Barry Wilkins (guitar), Winston Stewart (keyboards), Henderson (tenor sax, flute), Charles "Scoops" Allen (trumpet), and Alvin Hunter (drums) to create the album Black Rock. Lloyd Smith joined in 1973, and the band changed musical direction during the 1970s, forging a successful career in funk music. With the Stax/Volt label folding in 1975, the group signed with Mercury Records.

=== Funk years ===
In 1976, Dodson (vocals), Alexander (bass), Lloyd Smith (guitar), Allen (trumpet), Henderson (saxophone), Frank Thompson (trombone), Stewart (keyboards), and Mike Beard (drums) brought their "Shake Your Rump to the Funk" track into the R&B top five. In autumn 1977, the group came out with Flying High on Your Love, an album that featured "Shut the Funk Up", a "near-perfect disco song punctuated by the funky horn triumvirate of Charles 'Scoop' Allen, Harvey 'Joe' Henderson, and Frank 'Captain Disaster' Thompson and dominated by vocalist Larry 'D' Dodson's call to 'get on up or just shut the funk up'". The group peaked as a funk band from the late 1970s to the late 1980s. They released singles such as "Move Your Boogie Body" (1979), "Hit and Run" (1981), "Freak Show on the Dance Floor" (1984), "Certified True" (1987), "Struck by You" (1989).

In 1983, Sherman Guy left the group, and Larry 'LJ' Johnson took his place on vocals and percussion. Charles Allen left the group just before it took a more commercial direction. The Bar-Kays continued to have hits on R&B charts well into the 1980s.

=== Later years ===
Guitarist Marcus Price, a member of the band, was murdered in 1984. The crime has never been solved by the Memphis police.

The band took an extended break in the late 1980s but regrouped in 1991, with Alexander once again being the only original member. Since 1991, Larry Dodson, Archie Love, Bryan Smith, and Tony Gentry have been added to the group.

Alexander's son is the award-winning rapper and record producer Phalon "Jazze Pha" Alexander, named after Phalon Jones, who died in the 1967 plane crash. In 2013, the group was inducted into the Memphis Music Hall of Fame. On June 6, 2015, the Bar-Kays were inducted into the Official Rhythm & Blues Music Hall of Fame in Clarksdale, Mississippi.

Trumpeter Ben Cauley died in Memphis on September 21, 2015, at the age of 67. Drummer Michael Beard died in Memphis on August 25, 2025, at the age of 69.

== In popular culture ==
The Bar-Kays appeared in the 1973 film documentary, Wattstax.

"Freakshow on the Dance Floor" was featured in the first breakdance scene in the 1984 movie, Breakin'.

In the 1985 movie, Spies Like Us, starring Dan Aykroyd and Chevy Chase, The Bar-Kays' hit "Soul Finger" was being played by the crew of a Soviet mobile ICBM platform on patrol in the Tajik S.S.R. Their songs "Too Hot To Stop" and "Soul Finger" are featured in the 2007 comedy film, Superbad.

The Sugar Hill Gang's 1979 single "Rapper's Delight" (long version, 14:40) contains lyrics about the Bar-Kays, Farrah Fawcett, DJ Frankie Crocker and Johnny Carson.

== Discography ==
Studio albums

- Soul Finger (1967)
- Gotta Groove (1969)
- Black Rock (1971)
- Do You See What I See? (1972)
- Coldblooded (1974)
- Too Hot to Stop (1976)
- Flying High on Your Love (1977)
- Money Talks (1978)
- Light of Life (1978)
- Injoy (1979)
- As One (1980)
- Nightcruising (1981)
- Propositions (1982)
- Dangerous (1984)
- Banging the Wall (1985)
- Contagious (1987)
- Animal (1989)
- 48 Hours (1994)
- The Real Thing (2003)

Extended plays

- Grown Folks (2012)

=== Singles ===
Year	Title	Peak chart positions					Certifications	Album
Year	Title	US Pop	US R&B	US Dance	CAN	UK	Certifications	Album
1967	"Soul Finger"	17	3	—	13	33	US: Gold	Soul Finger
1967	"Knucklehead"	76	28	—	—	—		Soul Finger
1967	"Give Everybody Some"	91	36	—	—	—		Non-album singles
1972	"Son of Shaft"	53	10	—	—	—		Non-album singles
1976	"Shake Your Rump to the Funk"	23	5	—	—	41		Too Hot to Stop
1977	"Too Hot to Stop"	74	8	—	—	—		Too Hot to Stop
1977	"Spellbound"	—	29	—	—	—		Too Hot to Stop
1978	"Let's Have Some Fun"	—	11	—	—	—		Flying High on Your Love
1978	"Attitudes"	—	22	—	—	—		Flying High on Your Love
1978	"Holy Ghost"	—	9	—	—	—		Money Talks
1978	"I'll Dance"	—	26	—	—	—		Light of Life
1979	"Are You Being Real"	—	61	—	—	—		Light of Life
1979	"Shine"	—	14	—	—	—		Light of Life
1979	"Move Your Boogie Body"	57	3	90	—	—		Injoy
1979	"Today Is the Day"	60	25	—	—	—		Injoy
1980	"Boogie Body Land"	—	7	73	—	—		As One
1980	"Body Fever"	—	42	—	—	—		As One
1981	"Hit & Run"	—	5	49	—	—		Nightcruising
1982	"Freaky Behavior"	—	27	60	—	—		Nightcruising
1982	"Do It (Let Me See You Shake)"	—	9	—	—	—		Propositions
1983	"She Talks to Me with Her Body"	—	13	62	—	—		Propositions
1984	"Freak Show on the Dance Floor"	73	2	—	—	—		Dangerous
1984	"Sexomatic"	—	12	—	—	51		Dangerous
1984	"Dirty Dancer"	—	17	—	—	—		Dangerous
1985	"Your Place or Mine"	—	12	44	—	—		Banging the Wall
1985	"Banging the Walls"	—	67	—	—	—		Banging the Wall
1987	"Certified True"	—	9	—	—	—		Contagious
1987	"Don't Hang Up"	—	56	—	—	—		Contagious
1989	"Struck by You"	—	11	—	—	—		Animal
1989	"Animal"	—	66	—	—	—		Animal
1994	"Mega Mix"	—	96	—	—	—		48 Hours
1995	"The Slide"	—	82	—	—	—		48 Hours
1996	Everyone Wants That Love	—	101	—	—	—		The Best Of The Bar-Kays
2021	"Perfect Gentleman"	—	—	—	—	—		Non-album singles
2022	"Choosey Lover" (featuring Jazze Pha)	—	—	—	—	—		Non-album singles
"—" denotes releases that did not chart or were not released in that territory.
