= Jim Stewart (music producer) =

American record producer and executive (1930–2022)

- Stewart, c. 1960s

Background information
- Birth name: James Frank Stewart
- Born: July 29, 1930; Middleton, Tennessee, U.S.
- Died: December 5, 2022 (aged 92); Memphis, Tennessee, U.S.
- Genres: Soul
- Occupations: Record executive; record producer
- Years active: 1957–1975
- Labels: Stax
- Relatives: Estelle Axton (sister); Packy Axton (nephew)

James Frank Stewart (July 29, 1930 – December 5, 2022) was an American record producer and executive who in 1957 co-founded Stax Records with his sister Estelle Axton. Stax was one of the leading recording companies during soul and R&B music's heyday. The label also scored many hits on the Billboard Hot 100 pop music chart, and internationally, during this time.

== Life and career ==
Stewart was born on July 29, 1930. Raised on a farm in Middleton, Tennessee, he moved to Memphis in 1948 after graduating from high school, then worked at Sears and the First National Bank before being drafted into the United States Army. After serving for two years, Stewart returned to his job as a bank clerk in Memphis in 1953.

Stewart was a part-time fiddle player and joined a local country music group, the Canyon Cowboys. He worked days as a banker at Union Planters Bank. In 1957, Stewart launched his own record label, then called Satellite Records, which issued country music and rockabilly records. His sister, Estelle Axton, mortgaged her home to invest in her brother's venture by buying an Ampex 300 tape recorder. The label's ultimate name "Stax" was derived from Stewart and Axton.

Although Stewart initially recorded country music and some rockabilly, several local R&B musicians, including Rufus Thomas, found their way to Stax and also began recording there. With the success of Thomas' "Cause I Love You", Stewart made a distribution deal in 1960 giving Atlantic first choice on releasing Satellite (later Stax) recordings.

After selling millions of records during its history, Stax went bankrupt in 1976, years after Jerry Wexler got Stewart to sign a bad contract (which Stewart did not read) that made Stax lose 97% of the master recordings of its valuable catalogue of music without any compensation. It would eventually be acquired by Concord Records.

Stewart became reclusive afterwards, but in 2018, he made a rare public appearance at the Stax Museum to donate his fiddle to the museum.

Stewart died on December 5, 2022, at the age of 92.

Prior to his death in 2022, Stewart gave interviews for the HBO documentary Stax: Soulsville U.S.A., which was not released until 2024.

== Work ==
Some of the R & B artists who worked with Stewart include: William Bell, Booker T & the MGs, Eddie Floyd, Isaac Hayes, Otis Redding, Carla Thomas, and Sam & Dave.
