= Estelle Axton =

American record executive (1918–2004)

- Born: Estelle Stewart; September 11, 1918; Middleton, Tennessee, U.S.
- Died: February 24, 2004 (aged 85) Memphis, Tennessee, U.S.
- Occupation: Record executive
- Relatives: Jim Stewart (brother); Packy Axton (son)

Estelle Axton (née Stewart; September 11, 1918 – February 24, 2004) was an American record executive and co-founder of Stax Records, along with her brother Jim Stewart.

== Biography ==
Born in Middleton, Tennessee, Estelle Stewart grew up on a farm. Some of her earliest musical experiences came from playing the organ and piano in church, as well as playing in a quartet with her sister, father, and uncle. She moved to Memphis as a school teacher, married Everett Axton and took his name.

== Career ==
She was working in a bank when, in 1958, her brother Jim Stewart asked for help to develop Satellite Records, which he had set up to issue recordings of local country and rockabilly artists. She convinced her husband that they should remortgage their house, and, in 1959, she joined Satellite as an equal partner. The following year, Axton and Stewart turned the Capitol Theatre, in a black Memphis neighborhood, into a recording studio and record shop, and began making hit records with predominantly black artists.

Satellite was forced to abandon the name in 1961 after it was discovered that a Los Angeles label already owned the title. The owners changed it to Stax, from Stewart and Axton's surnames. Axton was actively involved with selecting and developing the artists on the label, including Rufus Thomas, Otis Redding, Booker T & the MGs, and Isaac Hayes. Axton sold her interest in the company in 1970. After a non-compete agreement expired, Axton formed Fretone Records whose biggest hit, "Disco Duck", by Rick Dees, was licensed for distribution by RSO Records.

In December 2006, the Recording Academy announced that Axton would be honored with a Trustee's Award as part of the upcoming Grammys.

Axton was the founder of the Memphis Songwriters Association in 1973, established to foster the education and advancement of local songwriters.

She went on, with her friend Cordell Jackson, the founder of Moon Records, to work with the Music Industries of Memphis, later named the Memphis Music Association, in the development once again of Memphis music as a global force. Their collaboration and guidance helped launch the first Memphis Demo Derby, the brainchild of the PR director Brett Hamilton, which was designed to present and showcase Memphis musical talent to A&R reps, studio heads, producers and the like. The event, a huge success that continued for several years, was assisted by Joe Savarin, the founder of the Handy Awards, and Wanda Freeman of Tenant Laboratories. The MMA was the umbrella organization for all Memphis music and still exists today.

== Honors ==
In 2012, Axton was inducted into the Memphis Music Hall of Fame, along with her brother and Stax co-founder Jim Stewart.

== Death ==
Axton died on February 24, 2004, at the Saint Francis Hospital hospice, in Memphis. She was buried at the Forest Hill Cemetery East in Memphis.

== See also ==
- Packy Axton
