= James Alexander (musician) =

American soul and R&B musician

- Born: Memphis, Tennessee, U.S.
- Genres: Funk, soul music, R&B
- Occupations: Musician, bassist
- Instrument: Bass
- Years active: 1964–present
- Member of: Bar-Kays

James Alexander is an American soul and R&B musician. He is a longtime member of the band the Bar-Kays, for which he plays bass guitar.

== Early life and family ==
Alexander was born at McLemore Clinic in Memphis, Tennessee. In a 2014 interview, he stated that the clinic was across the street from Stax Records' headquarters, and that he grew up about a block away from Stax. Alexander attended Booker T. Washington High School in Memphis.

He is the father of the hip-hop and R&B producer Phalon "Jazze Pha" Alexander, whom he named after his best friend and late Bar-Kays bandmate, Phalon Jones. Contrary to widespread belief, James Alexander's relationship, which produced his son Phalon, was not with R&B and gospel singer Deniece "Niecy" Williams, but rather with another woman (herself an experienced singer) named Denise Williams.

== Career ==
James Alexander was the bassist for the Bar-Kays when four of the six band members, including Phalon Jones, were killed in the same plane crash that claimed the life of soul singer Otis Redding. Alexander was the only Bar-Kays member not aboard that flight. According to a 2014 news article, before the plane departed, Alexander volunteered to return the band's rental car and take a commercial flight to the band's next engagement. One musician rescued but seven occupants (Redding, four of the Bar-Kays, the pilot and Redding's road manager) were killed.

After the crash, Ben Cauley, the sole survivor among those who were aboard the plane, worked with Alexander to reform the band. Subsequent work included the soundtrack recording of the Academy Award-winning theme song from the 1971 feature film Shaft, on which Alexander played bass guitar.

As of 2018, Alexander was the only original member performing in the still-active Bar-Kays.

== See also ==
- Stax Records
- Mercury Records
- Con Funk Shun
- Funk
