= Allen Jones (music producer) =

American record producer (1940–1987)

Allen Alvoid Jones Jr. (December 29, 1940 – May 5, 1987) was an American record producer and songwriter. Jones produced several albums for Albert King (including I'll Play the Blues for You, The Blues Don't Change and I Wanna Get Funky), and became the producer and manager for the Bar-Kays. He produced all of their records including their last records for Mercury Records. He formed their production company, and produced other acts such as Kwick on EMI and executively produced Ebony Webb, also on EMI.

Jones was also a successful songwriter, with his songs recorded by musicians including Elvis Costello, Sam & Dave, Clarence Carter, and Albert King. Songs he co-composed include "I Can't Stand Up for Falling Down", "Drownin' on Dry Land", "Heart Fixing Business", "If the Washing Don't Get You, The Rinsing Will", and "Hard to Handle".

Jones started out as a bass player, and ended up owning his own recording studio, (Onyx) a.k.a. American Recording Studio, in Memphis, Tennessee. He gave many artists and musicians opportunities to work in the recording industry, long before there were college classes on the music business. Jones knew a hit record and blossomed at Stax Records as a writer, producer and recording engineer. He lived to be in the studio and helped to make a name for Ardent Studios. He stayed in Studio A of Ardent for almost 10 years. He was the producer for Chocolate Milk's 1982 album, Friction and "Blue Jeans". Jones kept the Bar-Kays with songs and production work for their albums and tour dates until the day he died of a heart attack in 1987, aged 46.
