= Albert King discography =

Prominent American blues musician

- Studio albums: 15
- Live albums: 15
- Compilation albums: 22+
- Singles: 47

Albert King (1923–1992) was an American blues guitarist and singer who was active from the late 1940s to 1992. During the earlier part of his career, he recorded several singles for smaller record labels. In 1966, he began an association with Stax Records, where he enjoyed his greatest commercial success with both singles and albums. His 1967 album, Born Under a Bad Sign, has been acknowledged as one of the most important blues albums.

After Stax's bankruptcy in 1975, King recorded for several smaller labels. Meanwhile, his former record companies issued a number of live recordings, compilations, and re-packaged material. This trend accelerated after King's death in 1992, resulting in some charting releases as well as the inevitable redundancies.

== Albums 1962–1992 ==
=== Studio albums ===
List of studio albums with year, title, label, and chart peak
Year	Title	Label (Cat. no.)	Chart peak	
Year	Title	Label (Cat. no.)	R&B	US
1969	Years Gone By	Stax (STS-2010)		133
1969	Jammed Together (with Steve Cropper & Pops Staples)	Stax (STS-2020)		171
1970	Blues for Elvis - King Does the King's Things	Stax (STS-2015)		
1971	Lovejoy	Stax (STS-2040)	29	188
1972	I'll Play the Blues for You	Stax (STS-3009); 2012 reissue: Stax (33716)	11	140
1974	I Wanna Get Funky	Stax (STS-5505)	37	
1976	Truckload of Lovin'	Utopia (BUL 1-1387) (Note: Also issued as Tomato TOM-6003)	26	166
1976	Albert	Utopia (BUL 1-1731) (Note: Also issued as Tomato TOM-6004)	54	
1977	King Albert	Tomato (TOM-6002)		
1977	The Pinch (re-released in 1992 as The Blues Don't Change)	Stax (STX-4101); Stax (8570)		
1978	New Orleans Heat	Tomato (TOM-7022)	74	
1983	San Francisco '83 (re-released in 1992 as Crosscut Saw: Albert King in San Francisco with 2 bonus tracks)	Fantasy (F-9627); Stax (8571)		
1984	I'm in a Phone Booth, Baby	Fantasy (F-9633); Stax (8560)		
1986	The Lost Session (archive release; recorded 1971; with John Mayall)	Stax (8534)		
1991	Red House	Essential! (ESSLP 147)		
A blank space under "Chart peak" indicates a release that did not reach the charts.

=== Live albums ===
List of live albums with year, title, label, and chart peak
Year	Title	Label (Cat. no.)	Chart peak	
Year	Title	Label (Cat. no.)	R&B	US
1968	Live Wire/Blues Power	Stax (STS-2003)	40	150
1972	Wattstax: The Living Word (also various Stax performers)	Stax (STS 2-3010)		
1974	Montreux Festival (also Chico Hamilton and Little Milton)	Stax (STS-5520)		
1977	Albert Live	Utopia (CYL2-2205) (Note: Also issued as Tomato TOM2-7005)		182
1988	Blues at Sunrise (Note: Recorded 1973, Erlewine 1996, p. 148)	Stax (8546)		
1989	I'll Play the Blues for You (also John Lee Hooker; recorded 1977)	Tomato (2696141)		
1990	Wednesday Night in San Francisco (Note: Recorded 1968, Erlewine 1996, p. 148)	Stax (8556)		
1990	Thursday Night in San Francisco (Note: Recorded 1968, Erlewine 1996, p. 148)	Stax (8557)		
A blank space under "Chart peak" indicates a release that did not reach the charts.

=== Compilation albums ===
List of compilation albums with year, title, label, and chart peak
Year	Title	Label (Cat. no.)	Chart peak US
1963	The Big Blues (re-released in 1969 as Travelin' To California)	King (852)	
1967	Born Under a Bad Sign	Stax (S 723); 2013 reissue: Stax (34334)	
1969	King of the Blues Guitar	Atlantic (SD 8213)	194
1969	Door to Door (also Otis Rush)	Chess (LP-1538); 1990 reissue: Chess/MCA (CH-9322)	
1979	Chronicle (also Little Milton)	Stax (STX-4123)	
1982	Masterworks	Atlantic Deluxe (AD 2-4002)	
1986	The Best of Albert King	Stax/Fantasy (FCD-60-005)	
1989	Let's Have a Natural Ball	Modern Blues (MBLP-723)	
A blank space under "Chart peak" indicates a release that did not reach the charts.

== Posthumous albums (since 1993) ==
=== Selected live albums ===
List of live albums with year, title, label, and chart peak
Year	Title	Label (Cat. no.)	Chart peak Blues
1993	Blues at Sunset	Stax (8581)	
1994	Chicago 1978	Charly (754)	
1998	Rainin' in California	Wolf (120.500)	
1999	In Session (with Stevie Ray Vaughan)	Stax (7501); Stax (31423)	1
1999	Live in Canada	Charly (755)	
2001	Godfather of the Blues: His Last European Tour 1992 [DVD release]	P-Vine	
2003	Talkin' Blues	Thirsty Ear (THI 57129.2)	
2003	Live 69	Tomato (TOM-2068)	
2003	Blues from the Road (reissue of Albert Live)	Fuel 2000 (03020 61318 26)	
2014	Live in the '70s	Rockbeat (ROC-3245)	
2015	Live at the Fabulous Forum! 1972	Rockbeat (ROC-3324)	
A blank space under "Chart peak" indicates a release that did not reach the charts.

=== Selected compilation albums ===
Numerous Albert King compilation albums issued by a number of record companies have been released over the years (AllMusic shows over 100 compilations). The following lists some of the more notable and current releases:

List of compilation albums with year, title, label, and chart peak
Year	Title	Label (Cat. no.)	Chart peak Blues
1993	The Ultimate Collection	Rhino (71268)	
1994	The Tomato Years	Rhino (71623)	
1994	Funky London	Stax (8586)	
1996	Hard Bargain	Stax (8594)	
1999	Blues Masters: The Very Best of Albert King	Rhino (75703)	
2001	More Big Blues	Ace (827)	
2001	Guitar Man: An Essential Collection	Fuel 2000 (03020 61129 24)	
2002	Blue on Blues (also Freddie King)	Fuel 2000 (03020 61186 29)	
2004	The Complete King & Bobbin Recordings	Collectables (2887)	
2006	Stax Profiles: Albert King	Stax (8622)	
2007	The Very Best of Albert King	Stax (30296)	13
2011	The Definitive Albert King On Stax	Stax (32765)	
2013	Roadhouse Blues	Stax (34406)	
2017	Stax Classics: Albert King	Stax/Concord (STX-00200)	
A blank space under "Chart peak" indicates a release that did not reach the charts.

== Singles 1954–1992 ==
List of singles with year, title, label, and chart peak
Year	Title A-side / B-side	Label (Cat. no.)	Chart peak	
Year	Title A-side / B-side	Label (Cat. no.)	R&B	US
1954	"Bad Luck Blues" / "Be on Your Merry Way"	Parrot (798)		
1959	"Why Are You So Mean to Me" / "Ooh-Ee Baby"	Bobbin (114)		
1960	"Need You By My Side" / "The Time Has Come"	Bobbin (119)		
1960	"Blues at Sunrise" / "Let's Have a Natural Ball"	Bobbin (126)		
1961	"I Walked All Night Long" / "I've Made Nights by Myself"	Bobbin (129)		
1961	"Don't Throw Your Love on Me So Strong" / "This Morning"	King (5575) (Note: Also issued as Bobbin 131)	14	
1961	"Travelin' to California" / "Dyna-Flow"	King (5588) (Note: Also issued as Bobbin 130 and King 6265)		
1962	"I Get Evil" / "What Can I Do to Change Your Mind"	Bobbin (135)		
1963	"I'll Do Anything You Say" / "Got to Be Some Changes Made"	Bobbin (141)		
1963	"How About that Old Blue Ribbon" / "I've Made Nights by Myself"	Bobbin (143)		
1963	"This Funny Feeling" / "Had You Told It Like It Was"	King (5751)		
1964	"Worrisome Baby" / "C. O. D."	Coun-Tree (1006)		
1964	"Lonesome" / "You Threw Your Love on Me Too Strong"	Coun-Tree (1007)		
1966	"Laundromat Blues" / "Overall Junction"	Stax (190)	29	
1966	"Oh Pretty Woman" / "Funk Shun"	Stax (197)		
1967	"Crosscut Saw" / "Down Don't Bother Me"	Stax (201)	34	
1967	"Born Under a Bad Sign" / "Personal Manager"	Stax (217)	49	
1968	"Cold Feet" / "You Sure Drive a Hard Bargain"	Stax (241)	20	67
1968	"(I Love) Lucy" / "You're Gonna Need Me"	Stax (252)	46	
1968	"Blues Power" / "Night Stomp"	Stax (0020)		
1969	"The Hunter" / "As the Years Go Passing By"	Atlantic (2604)		
1969	"Drowning on Dry Land Pt. I" / "Pt. II"	Stax (0034)		
1969	"Tupelo Pt. I" / "Pt. II"	Stax (0047)		
1969	"Water" / "Opus De Soul"	Stax (0048)		
1969	"Cockroach" / "Wrapped Up in Love Again"	Stax (0058)		
1970	"Can't You See What You're Doing to Me" / "Cold Sweat"	Stax (0069)	50	127
1971	"Everybody Wants to Go to Heaven" / "Lovejoy, Ill."	Stax (0101)	38	103
1972	"Angel of Mercy" / "Funky London"	Stax (0121)	42	
1972	"I'll Play the Blues for You Pt. I" / "Pt. II"	Stax (0135)	31	
1972	"Breaking Up Somebody's Home" / "Little Brother (Make a Way)"	Stax (0147)	35	91
1973	"Playing on Me" / "High Cost of Living"	Stax (0166)		
1974	"That's What the Blues Is All About" / "I Wanna Get Funky"	Stax (0189)	15	
1974	"Flat Tire" / "I Can't Hear Nothing but the Blues"	Stax (0217)		
1974	"Crosscut Saw" / "Don't Burn Down the Bridge"	Stax (0228)		
1974	"Santa Claus Wants Some Lovin'" / "Don't Burn Down the Bridge"	Stax (0234) (Note: Also issued as Stax 3225)		
1975	"I'm Doing Fine" / "Ain't It Beautiful"	Stax (0245)		
1976	"Cadillac Assembly Line" / "Nobody Wants a Loser"	Utopia (10544)	40	
1976	"Sensation, Communication Together" / "Gonna Make It Somehow"	Utopia (10682)	80	
1976	"Guitar Man" / "Rub My Back"	Utopia (10770)	79	
1977	"Ain't Nothing You Can Do" /"I Don't Care What My Baby Do"	Utopia (10879)	95	
1978	"Call My Job" / "Love Shock"	Tomato (10001)	72	
1978	"Chump Change" / "Good Time Charlie"	Tomato (10002)	72	
1978	"The Pinch Paid Off Pt. I" / "Pt. II"	Stax (3203)		
1979	"The Very Thought of You" / "I Get Evil"	Tomato (10009)	87	
1979	"Born Under a Bad Sign" / "I've Got the Blues"	Tomato (10012)		
1983	"Ask Me No Questions" / "Honey Bee"	Fantasy (940)		
1986	"Down the Road I Go" / "Money Lovin' Woman"	Stax (1071)		
A blank space under "Chart peak" indicates a release that did not reach the charts.

== Bibliography ==
- Herzhaft, Gerard (1992). "Albert King". Encyclopedia of the Blues. Fayetteville, Arkansas: University of Arkansas Press. pp. 182–185. ISBN 1-55728-252-8.
- Erlewine, Daniel (1996). "Albert King". In Erlewine, Michael (ed.). All Music Guide to the Blues: The Experts' Guide to the Best Blues Recordings. All Music Guide to the Blues. San Francisco: Miller Freeman Books. pp. 147–149. ISBN 0-87930-424-3.
- Whitburn, Joel (1988). "Albert King". Top R&B Singles 1942–1988. Menomonee Falls, Wisconsin: Record Research. p. 238. ISBN 0-89820-068-7.
