= Hard Bargain =

Hard Bargain may refer to:

- Hard Bargain (Albert King album), 1996
- Hard Bargain (Emmylou Harris album), 2011
- Hard Bargain (Burn Notice), an episode of Burn Notice
- Hard Bargain (Charlottesville, Virginia), a historic home
- Hard Bargain, the capital of Moore's Island, Bahamas
- Hardbargain, a village in Trinidad
- Hard Bargain, a village in North Andros, Bahamas
