= Monthureux =

Monthureux, a French placename derived from Medieval Latin monasteriolum ("little monastery"), may refer to:

- Monthureux-sur-Saône
- Monthureux-le-Sec

== See also ==
- Montreux and Montreuil, other French and Swiss towns named for their growth around small monasteries
