= Midnight Drive =

Midnight Drive may refer to:

== Music ==
- Midnight Drive (Tommy Emmanuel album), a 1997 album originally named Can't Get Enough
- Midnight Drive (The Kinsey Report album), a 1989 album by the Kinsey Report
- Midnight Drive, Stephen Ross's 1991 album featuring Jens Johansson on keyboards
- "Midnight Drive", a song by Rustie from disc 1 of the Warp20 compilation album
- "Midnight Drive", a song from the 2005 music video game Dance Dance Revolution Mario Mix by Nintendo and Konami

== Other ==
- The Midnight Drives, 2007 British comedy-drama film
