= Born Under a Bad Sign =

Studio album by Albert King
- Released: August 1967
- Recorded: March 1966 – June 1967
- Studios: Stax, Memphis, Tennessee
- Genre: Electric blues
- Length: 34:19
- Label: Stax
- Producer: Jim Stewart

Albert King chronology
The Big Blues (1962)	Born Under a Bad Sign (1967)	Live Wire/Blues Power (1968)

Born Under a Bad Sign is the second studio album by American blues musician Albert King, released in August 1967 by Stax Records. It features eleven electric blues songs that were recorded from March 1966 to June 1967, throughout five different sessions. King played with Booker T. & the M.G.'s and the Memphis Horns for these recording sessions. Although the album failed to reach any music chart, it did receive positive reviews from music critics and is often cited as one of the greatest blues albums ever made. Born Under a Bad Sign influenced many guitarists, including Eric Clapton, Mike Bloomfield, Jimi Hendrix, and Stevie Ray Vaughan. Born Under a Bad Sign has been recognized by several music institutions, and has been inducted into the Blues Foundation Hall of Fame, the Grammy Hall of Fame, and the National Recording Registry.

== Recording and music ==
In 1966, King signed with the Memphis-based label Stax Records. The 43-year-old musician had already recorded music for other labels, but outside of his 1961 song "Don't Throw Your Love on Me So Strong", (Note: "Don't Throw Your Love on Me So Strong" reached number fourteen on the Billboard Hot R&B Sides chart.) he had yet to find any commercial success. Throughout five sessions from March 1966 to June 1967, King recorded several songs at Stax Studios with the in-house band Booker T. & the M.G.'s with the Memphis Horns. (Note: The five recording sessions occurred on: March 3, 1966; August 3, 1966; November 2, 1966; May 17, 1967; and June 9, 1967.) Although Jim Stewart is credited as the producer, trumpeter Wayne Jackson said Steve Cropper and Al Jackson Jr. ran the recording sessions. Many of the songs recorded during these sessions were released as singles, and in August 1967, the singles were compiled and released as King's debut album with Stax, titled Born Under a Bad Sign.

"Born Under a Bad Sign"
A sixteen-second sample of "Born Under a Bad Sign", where King sings the chorus.

Born Under a Bad Sign is an electric blues album, with influences of soul and funk. The album's music comprises simple chord progressions, which Jackson noted was due to inexperience. "We didn't know how to play it any better!" said Jackson. King played primarily on the three highest guitar strings and only used a select few phrases throughout the album. In the liner notes for the 2002 reissue of Born Under a Bad Sign, critic Michael Point wrote how King was able to distinguish his guitar play despite only using a few phrases: "His simple but subtle reconfigurations were accomplished through inflections, emphasis, and timing, not via sprinting through scales."

The sharp guitar sound heard throughout the album can be partially attributed to King's unorthodox style of playing. King was left-handed, but chose to play a right-handed Gibson Flying V and not restring it. King pulled strings from above instead of pushing from below, the standard string bending technique. As a result, he was able to bend several strings simultaneously, which allowed for multi-timbral phrasing. When asked about King's style of play, Jackson said: "Albert's guitar was always out of tune with everything else, but he was such a strong man he would just bend the notes back in!"

Side one of Born Under a Bad Sign features six short songs, which are all under three minutes long, while side two features longer, more ballad-like songs. Arguably the most famous song from Born Under a Bad Sign is the album's title track, which was written by William Bell and Booker T. Jones. Bell wanted to write a song about astrology and came up with an unconventional ten-bar guitar line (as opposed to eight-bar and twelve-bar blues) during a jam session. Music historian Rob Bowman called "Born Under a Bad Sign" "one of the most smokingly intense blues recordings of the modern era".

== Release and reception ==
Born Under a Bad Sign was released in August 1967 by Stax Records. It failed to reach any music chart, although three songs from the album—"Laundromat Blues" (1966), "Born Under a Bad Sign", and "Crosscut Saw" (both 1967)—did reach the Hot Rhythm & Blues Singles chart. Rob Bowman believes this was because the rhythm and blues market emphasized 45 rpm singles as opposed to albums. A critic from Billboard magazine awarded the album a "Special Merit Pick" label, and wrote: "Albert King has a way with the blues, a realistic, soulful style which hits the mark as all 11 cuts in his latest Stax album demonstrate."

Born Under a Bad Sign was reissued in 2013 by Stax and Concord Records. The reissue features remastered versions of every song from the original release, as well as four alternative versions, one untitled instrumental piece, and additional liner notes. Neil Kelly of PopMatters felt the additional songs were enough to warrant a repurchase, and highlighted the instrumental piece. Kelly said: "Booker T and the MG's never sounded better, even on a one-off jam that was never supposed to be issued."

The album was reissued on April 21, 2023 by Stax Records on vinyl and SACD, mastered in hi-res from the original stereo tapes.

=== Legacy ===
Retrospective professional reviews
Review scores
Source	Rating
AllMusic	5/5 stars
MusicHound Blues	5/5 stars
PopMatters	10/10 stars
The Rolling Stone Jazz & Blues Album Guide	5/5 stars
The Penguin Guide to Blues Recordings	4/4 stars

Decades after its release, Born Under a Bad Sign's status continues to grow, and it is now considered one of the greatest blues albums ever made. The Rolling Stone Jazz & Blues Album Guide gave Born Under a Bad Sign a perfect score, where author David McGee described it as "a blues monument". Leland Rucker echoed McGee's remark in the MusicHound Blues: The Essential Album Guide book, writing "King's Stax debut Born Under a Bad Sign is an undisputed classic." Stephen Thomas Erlewine of AllMusic highlighted the musicianship between King and the M.G.'s, and wrote: "it's astounding how strong this catalog of songs is".

Erlewine noted how influential the guitar playing on the album was. "[King] unleashed a torrent of blistering guitar runs that were profoundly influential, not just in blues, but in rock & roll". Journalist Sean McDevitt agreed with this statement, and wrote "Born Under a Bad Sign directly influenced legions of guitar players who studied its every subtlety and nuance". Among these guitarists are Eric Clapton, Mike Bloomfield, Jimi Hendrix, and Stevie Ray Vaughan, most of whom covered songs from Born Under a Bad Sign. Clapton copied the guitar solo from "Oh, Pretty Woman" for his band Cream's song "Strange Brew", and Cream covered "Born Under a Bad Sign" for their 1968 album Wheels of Fire. The Paul Butterfield Blues Band also covered "Born Under a Bad Sign" for the 1967 album The Resurrection of Pigboy Crabshaw.

Born Under a Bad Sign has been recognized by several music institutions as an influential album. It has been inducted into the Blues Foundation Hall of Fame and the Grammy Hall of Fame, and the National Recording Registry. The 2002 reissue received a Blues Music Award for "Historical Blues Album of the Year". In 2012, Rolling Stone ranked Born Under a Bad Sign at number 491 on its list of the 500 greatest albums of all time. The list states: "King's first album for the Stax label combines his hard, unflashy guitar playing with the sleek sound of the label's house band, Booker T. and the MG's."

Michael Point believes Born Under a Bad Sign was critical to the modernization of blues music, and catapulted King into mainstream popularity. King went from playing on the Chitlin' Circuit as a relatively unknown musician, to large rock arenas such as the Fillmore and Fillmore East. These performances attracted both black and white audience members, including a large following of hippie fans.

== Track listing ==
Track listing taken from the 1967 vinyl release of Born Under a Bad Sign.

Side one
No.	Title	Writer(s)	Length
1.	"Born Under a Bad Sign"	William Bell, Booker T. Jones	2:47
2.	"Crosscut Saw"	R.G. Ford	2:35
3.	"Kansas City"	Jerry Leiber, Mike Stoller	2:33
4.	"Oh, Pretty Woman"	A.C. Williams	2:48
5.	"Down Don't Bother Me"	Albert King	2:10
6.	"The Hunter"	Booker T. Jones, Carl Wells, Steve Cropper, Donald Dunn, Al Jackson, Jr.	2:45

Side two
No.	Title	Writer(s)	Length
7.	"I Almost Lost My Mind"	Ivory Joe Hunter	3:30
8.	"Personal Manager"	Albert King, David Porter	4:31
9.	"Laundromat Blues"	Sandy Jones	3:21
10.	"As the Years Go Passing By"	Deadric Malone	3:48
11.	"The Very Thought of You"	Ray Noble	3:46

Born Under a Bad Sign – 2013 remastered edition
No.	Title	Length
12.	"Born Under a Bad Sign" (Take 1 - Alternate)	2:52
13.	"Crosscut Saw" (Take 1 - Alternate)	3:01
14.	"The Hunter" (Take 1 - Alternate)	2:48
15.	"Personal Manager" (Take 15 - Alternate)	3:21
16.	"Untitled Instrumental"	2:06

== Personnel ==
- Albert King – lead guitar, vocals
- Booker T. & the M.G.'s
  - Booker T. Jones – keyboards, organ, piano
  - Steve Cropper – rhythm guitar
  - Donald Dunn – bass guitar
  - Al Jackson Jr. – drums
- The Memphis Horns
  - Wayne Jackson – trumpet
  - Andrew Love – tenor saxophone
- Joe Arnold – baritone saxophone, flute
- Raymond Hill – tenor saxophone
