= Blues at Sunset =

Live album by Albert King
- Released: 1993
- Recorded: August 20, 1972 (Wattstax) and July 1, 1973 (Montreux)
- Genre: Blues
- Length: 49:21
- Label: Stax Records
- Producer: Al Bell (Wattstax)

Albert King chronology
Thursday Night in San Francisco (1990)	Blues at Sunset (1993)	Chicago 1978 (1994)

Professional ratings
Review scores
Source	Rating
AllMusic	3/5 stars
The Penguin Guide to Blues Recordings	2.5/4 stars

Blues at Sunset is a blues album by Albert King, recorded live at Wattstax (August 20, 1972) and at the Montreux Jazz Festival (July 1, 1973), and released in 1993. Material recorded at the 1973 Montreux festival had previously been released in his albums Montreux Festival and Blues At Sunrise.

== Track listing ==
1. "Match Box Blues" (Albert King) – 4:41
2. "Got To Be Some Changes Made" (Albert King, Conrad) – 5:31
3. "I'll Play the Blues For You" (Jerry Beach) – 5:40
4. "Killing Floor" (Chester Burnett) – 3:37
5. "Angel of Mercy" (Homer Banks, Raymond Jackson) – 5:02
6. "Match Box Blues" (Albert King) – 5:22
7. "Watermelon Man" (Herbie Hancock) – 2:35
8. "Breaking Up Somebody's Home" (Al Jackson Jr., Timothy Matthews) – 5:02
9. "Stormy Monday" (Aaron "T-Bone" Walker) – 11:51

At Wattstax: #1–5. At Montreux: #6–9.

== Personnel (Wattstax) ==
- Albert King - Electric guitar and vocals
- other personnel unknown

Wattstax recording by Wally Heider Studios.

== Personnel (Montreux) ==
- Albert King - Electric guitar and vocals
- Donald Kinsey - Electric guitar
- Rick Watson - Tenor saxophone
- Norville Hodges - Trumpet
- Wilbur Thompson - Trumpet
- James Washington - Organ
- Bill Rennie - Bass
- Sam King - Drums

Montreux recording by SR (Radio Suisse) staff.

Digital remastering: 1993, Phil de Lancie (Phantasy Studios, Berkeley).
