= Nothing but the blues =

Nothing but the blues may refer to:

- Nothing but the Blues: The Music and the Musicians (New York : Abbeville Press, 1993), a book edited by Lawrence Cohn
- Nothing but the Blues (Herb Ellis album), 1957
- Nothin' but the Blues (Johnny Winter album), 1977
- Nothin' but the Blues (Joe Williams album), 1984
- Nothin' but the Blues (Elkie Brooks album), 1994
- "I Ain't Got Nothin' but the Blues", a 1937 song composed by Duke Ellington, with lyrics written by Don George
- It Ain't Nothin' but the Blues, a musical revue written by Charles Bevel, Lita Gaithers, Randal Myler, Ron Taylor, and Dan Wheetman
- "I Can't Hear Nothing but the Blues", a 1974 song (see Albert King discography)
- Nothing but the Blues (film), a 1995 documentary film about Eric Clapton's career and love for blues music
