= Powerhouse (Kinsey Report album) =

Studio album by the Kinsey Report
- Released: March 5, 1991
- Genre: Blues, rock
- Label: Pointblank

The Kinsey Report chronology
Midnight Drive (1989)	Powerhouse (1991)	Crossing Bridges (1993)

Powerhouse is an album by the American band the Kinsey Report, released on March 5, 1991. They supported it with North American tours that included a stint with labelmates Albert Collins and Larry McCray. The album was named for the Kinseys' grandfather's church, Powerhouse Church of God in Christ.

== Production ==
The band incorporated more of the sounds of their previous work: hard rock from Ralph and Donald's band White Lightnin'; reggae from Donald's time with Peter Tosh and Bob Marley. Family patriarch Big Daddy Kinsey played guitar on "Good Mornin' Mississippi". "Keep On Moving" is about the father's journey from the Mississippi Delta to Gary, Indiana. "I'll Be Singing the Blues" addresses the homelessness crisis of the 1980s.

== Critical reception ==
Professional ratings
Review scores
Source	Rating
All Music Guide to the Blues	3/5 stars
Blade-Citizen	3/4 stars
The Buffalo News	1.5/5 stars
The Cincinnati Post	3.5/5 stars
The Encyclopedia of Popular Music	2/5 stars
The Grove Press Guide to the Blues on CD	3.5/5 stars
MusicHound Blues: The Essential Album Guide	2.5/5 stars
The Philadelphia Inquirer	2/4 stars
The Star-Ledger	3/4 stars

The Chicago Tribune said that the band has "a polished sound that spans classic Chicago blues, reggae ... and hard-driving modern rock." The Houston Post called them "a kind of Living Colour for folks who grew up listening to South Side Chicago blues." The Asbury Park Press concluded that the Kinsey Report "prove there are new ways to combine rock with blues without sounding like Eric Clapton retreads." The Philadelphia Inquirer panned the "serviceable" songs. The Buffalo News stated that "great chops don't necessarily mean compelling—much less moving—music."

== Track listing ==
No.	Title	Length
1.	"Image Maker"
2.	"Teenage Rage"
3.	"I'll Be Singing the Blues"
4.	"Bad Talking"
5.	"Hit the Spot"
6.	"Heart's on Fire"
7.	"Keep On Moving"
8.	"Walk with Balance"
9.	"Jammin' Out Tonight"
10.	"Good Mornin' Mississippi"
