= Marvin Phillip =

Trinidad and Tobago footballer

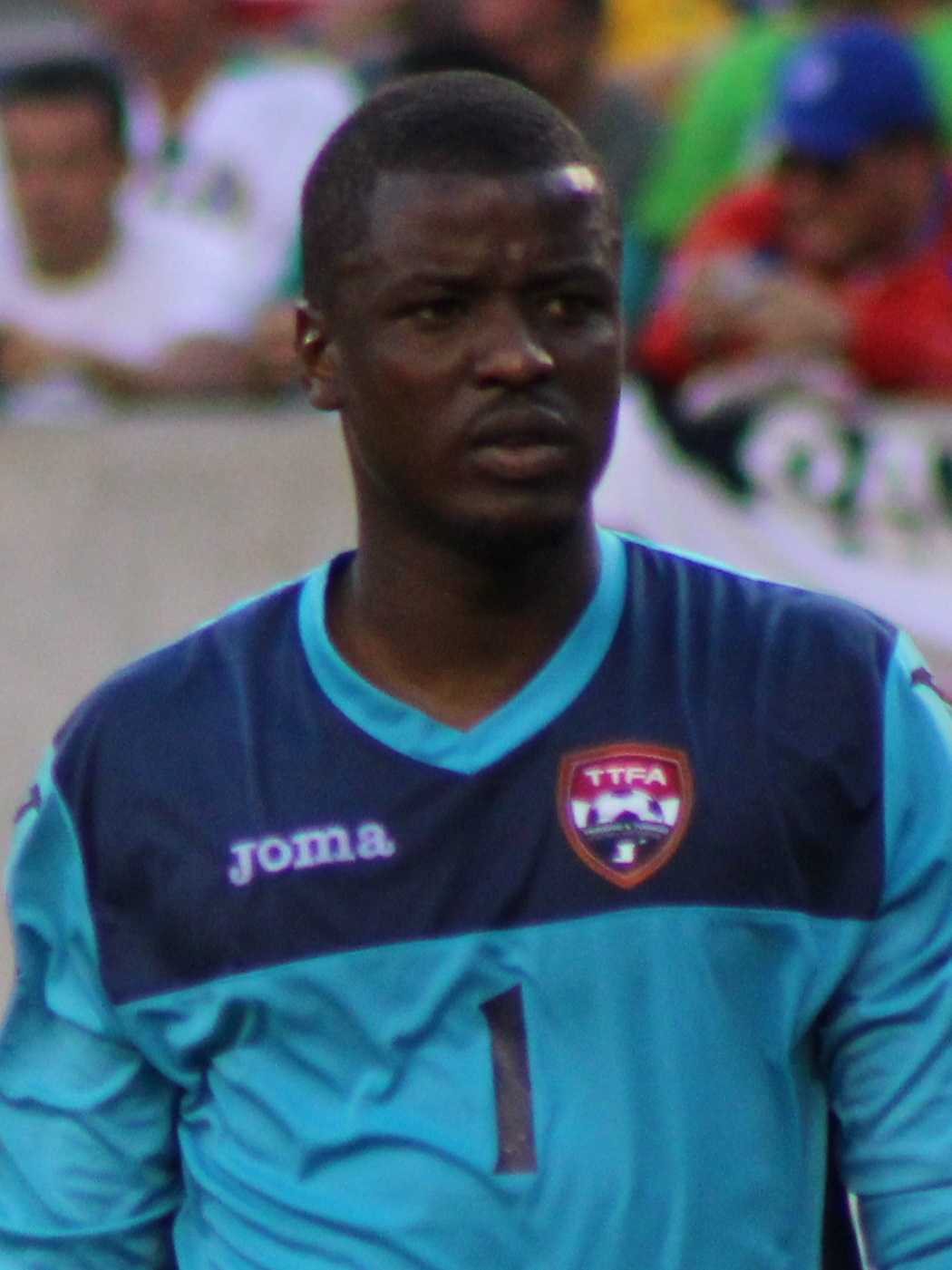
- Phillip with Trinidad and Tobago in 2015

Personal information
- Date of birth: 1 August 1984 (age 42)
- Place of birth: Williamsville, Trinidad and Tobago
- Height: 1.84 m (6 ft 0 in)
- Position: Goalkeeper

Team information
- Current team: AC Port of Spain

Senior career*
Years	Team	Apps	(Gls)
2002–2005	San Juan Jabloteh		
2004	→ Defence Force (loan)		
2006–2007	Starworld Strikers		
2007	North East Stars		
2007–2011	W Connection		
2010	→ Joe Public (loan)		
2011–2012	T&TEC		
2012–2013	Central		
2013–2015	Point Fortin		
2015–2019	Morvant Caledonia United		
2019	NEROCA	14	(0)
2023–	AC Port of Spain		

International career^{‡}
2007–2025	Trinidad and Tobago	92	(0)
- * Club domestic league appearances and goals as of 12 March 2016 ‡ National team caps and goals as of 11:15, 26 May 2025 (UTC)

Marvin Phillip (born 1 August 1984) is a Trinidadian professional footballer who plays as a goalkeeper for AC Port of Spain. He made his debut for Trinidad and Tobago against Panama on 31 January 2007.

== Club career ==
Phillip played as a striker at schoolboy level, but retrained to become a goalkeeper before turning professional. Phillip once played a full season for his college team Presentation College San Fernando as a striker, where he top scored for his school. He has also won domestic titles as a cricketer.

Phillips has played for several domestic clubs in Trinidad and Tobago.

In 2019, he moved to India and signed with I-League side NEROCA on a season-long deal. He appeared in twelve league games as they finished the 2019–20 season on ninth position.

== International career ==
In December 2008, Phillip's international career came into doubt after he was stabbed in the back in Hardbargain, but the goalkeeper made a full recovery and was able to play, in the absence of Clayton Ince, in World Cup qualifying matches in 2009. Phillip was called up and featured in the 2021 Gold Cup for Trinidad.

== Personal life ==
In May 2014, Adella Gill, the mother of Phillip's first child, died from heart failure. In July, his 10-month-old son, Matai, also died.
