= Blues at Sunrise (Albert King album) =

Live album by Albert King
- Released: 1988
- Recorded: July 1, 1973
- Venue: Montreux Jazz Festival, Switzerland
- Genre: Soul blues, electric blues
- Length: 45:49
- Label: Stax
- Producer: Danny Kopelson

Albert King chronology
I'm in a Phone Booth, Baby (1984)	Blues at Sunrise (1988)	I Wanna Get Funky (1989)

Professional ratings
Review scores
Source	Rating
AllMusic	3/5 stars
The Penguin Guide to Blues Recordings	3/4 stars
Select	3/5 stars

Blues at Sunrise is a blues album by Albert King, recorded live at the Montreux Jazz Festival (July 1, 1973), and released in 1988. Material recorded on the 1973 Montreux festival was also released in his albums Montreux Festival and Blues at Sunset.

== Track listing ==
1. "Don't Burn Down the Bridge ('Cause You Might Wanna Come Back Across)" (Allen Jones, Carl Wells) – 4:28
2. "I Believe to My Soul" (Ray Charles) – 4:56
3. "For the Love of a Woman" (Don Nix) – 3:57
4. "Blues at Sunrise" (Albert King) – 10:05
5. "I'll Play the Blues for You" (Jerry Beach) – 6:35
6. "Little Brother (Make a Way)" (Henry Bush, Allen Jones, Carl Smith) – 5:44
7. "Roadhouse Blues" (Albert King) – 10:04

== Personnel ==
- Albert King - electric guitar, vocals
- Donald Kinsey - electric guitar
- Rick Watson - tenor saxophone
- Norville Hodges - trumpet
- Wilbur Thompson - trumpet
- James Washington - organ
- Bill Rennie - bass guitar
- Sam King - drums
