= The Kinsey Report =

American musical group

The Kinsey Report is a Gary, Indiana-based band, established in 1984 by the brothers Donald, Ralph, and Kenneth Kinsey, plus a family friend, Ron Prince. As Big Daddy Kinsey and the Kinsey Report, they effectively backed their father, Big Daddy Kinsey. Lester Davenport played harmonica with the group.

The Kinsey Report's father was instrumental in steering his offspring towards the blues. The older brothers, Donald and Ralph, formed a blues/rock trio called White Lightnin', before the younger children also ended up in the group. Albert King, Bob Marley, Muddy Waters and Big Daddy Kinsey have all toured with the group.

== Discography ==
- Edge of the City (1988)
- Midnight Drive (1989)
- Powerhouse (1991)
- Crossing Bridges (1993)
- Smoke and Steel (1999)
