= Montreux Festival (album) =

Live album by Albert King, Chico Hamilton and Little Milton
- Released: 1974
- Recorded: July 1, 1973
- Venue: Montreux Jazz Festival, Montreux, Switzerland
- Genre: Blues
- Length: 39:12
- Label: Stax
- Producer: Henry Bush

Albert King, Chico Hamilton and Little Milton chronology
I Wanna Get Funky (1974)	Montreux Festival (1974)	The Blues Don't Change (1974)

Professional ratings
Review scores
Source	Rating
AllMusic	3/5 stars

Montreux Festival is a blues album by Albert King, Chico Hamilton and Little Milton, recorded live on July 1, 1973, at the Montreux Jazz Festival.

== Track listing ==
1. "In View" (Barry Finnerty) – 12:20 - Chico Hamilton
2. "Let Me Down Easy" (Morris Dollison) – 6:35 - Little Milton
3. "We're Gonna Make It" (Gene Barge, Billy Davis, Raynard Miner, Carl Smith) – 3:17 - Little Milton
4. "Don't Make No Sense" (Carl Smith, E. Faulkner) – 7:06 - Albert King
5. "Stormy Monday" (Aaron Walker) – 5:27 - Albert King
6. "For the Love of a Woman" (Don Nix) – 4:27 - Albert King

== Personnel ==
- Albert King – electric guitar, vocals
- Little Milton – guitar, vocals
- Donald Kinsey, Barry Finnerty, Jerome Hayes – guitar
- Rick Watson, Wayne Preston, John Polk – tenor saxophone
- Arnie Lawrence, Alex Foster – alto saxophone
- Norville Hodges, Wilbur Thompson, Herbert J. Williams – trumpet
- James Washington – organ
- Bill Rennie, Mike Richmond, Joe Turner – bass
- Sam King, Calep Emphery, Chico Hamilton – drums
