= Monthureux-le-Sec =

- Commune
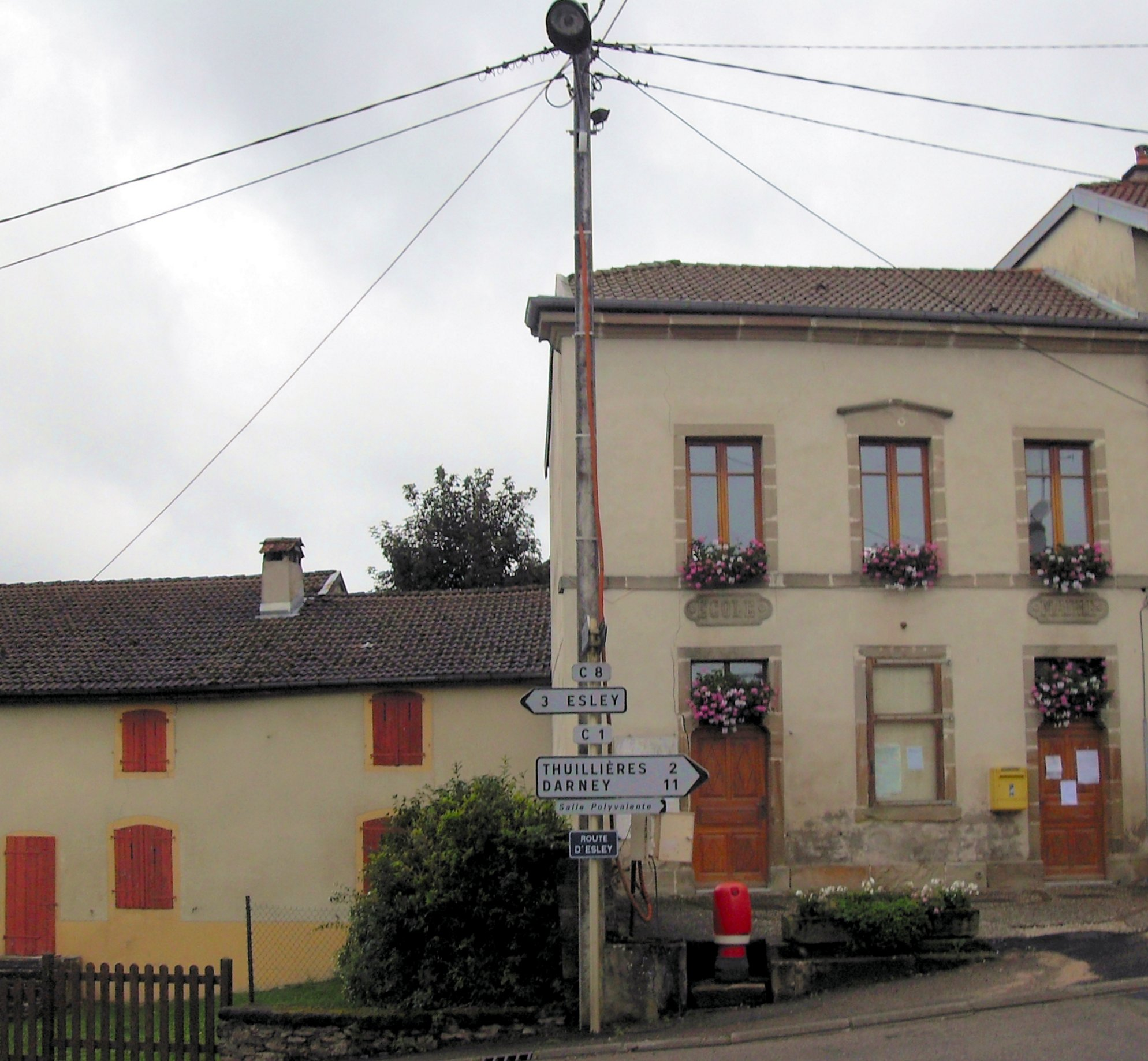
- The town hall and school in Monthureux-le-Sec
- Location of Monthureux-le-Sec
- Location within France Location within Grand Est
- Coordinates: 48°10′19″N 6°01′34″E
- Country: France
- Region: Grand Est
- Department: Vosges
- Arrondissement: Neufchâteau
- Canton: Vittel
- Intercommunality: CC Terre d'eau

Government
  - Mayor (2020–2026): Bernard Pothier
- Area^{1}: 11.36 km^{2} (4.39 sq mi)
- Elevation: 420 m (1,380 ft)
- Highest elevation: 448 m (1,470 ft)
- Lowest elevation: 345 m (1,132 ft)
- Population (2023): 175
  - Density: 15.4/km^{2} (39.9/sq mi)
- Time zone: UTC+01:00 (CET)
  - Summer (DST): UTC+02:00 (CEST)
- INSEE/Postal code: 88309 /88800
- ^{1} French Land Register data, which excludes lakes, ponds, glaciers > 1 km^{2} (0.386 sq mi or 247 acres) and river estuaries.

Monthureux-le-Sec (French pronunciation: [mɔ̃tyʁø lə sɛk]) is a commune in the Vosges department in Grand Est in northeastern France.

In French, its inhabitants are called Monthécursiens.

== Name ==
The French name Monthureux-le-Sec ("Monthureux the Dry") distinguishes this town from Monthureux-sur-Saône on the Saône River. Both names derive from Medieval Latin monasteriolum ("little monastery"), as do numerous other locations known as Montreuil and Montreux.

== Geography ==
The commune contains the meeting point of the three drainage basins of the rivers Rhône, Rhine and Meuse.

== Personalities ==
Célestin Gérard, (1821 - 1885) manufacturer of agricultural machinery and inventor of a mobile Threshing machine and of other steam powered implements, was born at Monthureux-le-Sec.

== See also ==
- Communes of the Vosges department
