= Midnight Drive (The Kinsey Report album) =

Studio album by the Kinsey Report
- Released: 1989
- Studio: Streeterville
- Genres: Blues; rock
- Length: 40:22
- Label: Alligator
- Producers: Bruce Iglauer; Donald Kinsey; the Kinsey Report

The Kinsey Report chronology
Edge of the City (1987)	Midnight Drive (1989)	Powerhouse (1991)

Midnight Drive is the second album by the American band the Kinsey Report, released in 1989. The band supported the album with a North American tour. At the time of its release, Midnight Drive was one of Alligator Records' best selling albums. Issues with patriarch Big Daddy Kinsey, among other problems, led to changes in the Kinsey Report's lineup on subsequent albums.

== Production ==
Midnight Drive was produced by Bruce Iglauer, Donald Kinsey, and the band. The Kinsey Report incorporated more of a rock and funk sound on the album. They wrote eight of its ten songs. "Nowhere to Go, Nothing to Lose" is about a steel worker who loses his job due to automation. "Free South Africa", an anti-apartheid song, reflected Donald Kinsey's admiration for the hopeful messages in many blues and reggae songs. "River's Invitation" is a cover of the Percy Mayfield song.

== Critical reception ==
Professional ratings
Review scores
Source	Rating
Chicago Tribune	3/4 stars
The Cincinnati Post	4/4 stars
MusicHound Blues: The Essential Album Guide	3.5/5 stars
The Penguin Guide to Blues Recordings	2.5/4 stars
St. Petersburg Times	4/5 stars

The Chicago Tribune wrote that "Donald Kinsey, without benefit of special effects, puts on a guitar clinic on the Report's second album that should give pause to better-known gunslingers such as Eddie Van Halen and Stevie Ray Vaughan." Newsday concluded that "the title track, a barrelling number adorned with tight, sharp guitar figures, and 'See Her Again', with its similar power, show what the Kinsey Brothers are made of: blues with rock influences (particularly Jimi Hendrix for the guitarists), not a blues-influenced rock band." The Washington Post opined that "most of the songs seem to offer little more than a flimsy excuse to wail on guitar."

The St. Petersburg Times praised Donald Kinsey and stated that "not since Jimi Hendrix has a black guitarist so effectively blended elements of blues and rock." The Edmonton Journal said that "Kinsey approaches the blues from a devil-may-care stand point—we're almost talking brash, '60s British era Chicken Shack, or forsooth, Fleetwood Mac." The Daily Herald determined that Midnight Drive is "an attempt to take the blues form one solid step farther, and, in doing that, it displays smashing originality and stays close the basics, too."

== Track listing ==
No.	Title	Length
1.	"Midnight Drive"	4:36
2.	"Big Time"	3:20
3.	"Nowhere to Go, Nothing to Lose"	4:21
4.	"See Her Again"	4:01
5.	"Can't Stop Thinking About You"	4:17
6.	"Love's Overdue"	3:31
7.	"Hit Woman"	3:38
8.	"River's Invitation"	3:39
9.	"Get Outta Here"	4:02
10.	"Free South Africa"	4:57
Total length:		40:22
