= Clifford Gibson =

American blues singer and guitarist

Clifford "Grandpappy" Gibson (April 17, 1901 – December 21, 1963) was an American blues singer and guitarist. He is best known for the tracks, "Bad Luck Dice" and "Hard Headed Blues".

Born in Louisville, Kentucky, United States, he moved to St. Louis, Missouri, in the 1920s and lived there for the rest of his life. He played in St. Louis clubs, and in 1929 began recording for the QRS and Victor labels. He is regarded as one of the earliest urban blues performers, with no pronounced rural influences. His guitar playing style resembled that of Lonnie Johnson, with an emphasis on vibrato and improvisation. His playing could be distinguished from Johnson's by a sharper tone resulting from the use of a capo high up the neck, and his use of open tunings. Among the many themes touched on in his songs, "Don't Put That Thing on Me" is notable for its references to hoodoo, an African American form of folk magic.

Gibson accompanied Jimmie Rodgers on a Victor single, "Let Me Be Your Side Track", in 1931, then spent parts of the next three decades playing in the streets around St. Louis. Gibson resurfaced on recordings in 1960 on Little Milton's Bobbin label, and worked another three years in St. Louis' Gaslight Square, before his death from pulmonary edema in 1963.
