= The Big Blues =

Studio album by Albert King
- Released: 1963
- Recorded: 1959–1962
- Genre: Blues
- Length: 34:49
- Label: King

Albert King chronology
The Big Blues (1963)	Born Under a Bad Sign (1967)

The Big Blues is an album by Albert King, released by King Records in 1963. It is his first album and the only one before he signed with Stax Records, where he would record most albums during his career. The album was later reissued under the title Travelin' to California.

== Recording ==
The Big Blues compiles songs previously released as singles by Bobbin Records and King Records between 1959 and 1963. Albert King recorded "Blues at Sunrise" and "Let's Have a Natural Ball" for the Bobbin label (of St. Louis) in 1960, which helped to introduce him to a wider audience.

In October 1961, Albert King released "Don't Throw Your Love on Me So Strong", which included Ike Turner on piano. It did so well locally that King Records (of Cincinnati) leased the record from Bobbin and re-released it the next month. It became King's first appearance on the charts, peaking at number 14 on the Billboard R&B chart.

Professional ratings
Review scores
Source	Rating
AllMusic	4.5/5 stars
The Penguin Guide to Blues Recordings	3/4 stars

== Track listing ==
All songs were written by Albert King, except where noted.

Side 1

1. "Let's Have a Natural Ball" – 2:52
2. "What Can I Do to Change Your Mind?" – 2:48
3. "I Get Evil" – 2:26
4. "Had You Told It Like It Was (It Wouldn't Be Like It Is)" (Sonny Thompson, Gene Redd) – 2:59
5. "This Morning" – 2:10
6. "I Walked All Night Long" – 2:51

Side 2

1. "Don't Throw Your Love on Me So Strong" – 2:55
2. "Travelin' to California" – 3:00
3. "I've Made Nights by Myself" – 2:34
4. "This Funny Feeling" (Rudy Toombs) – 2:32
5. "Ooh-Ee Baby" – 3:52
6. "Dyna Flow" – 2:50

== Personnel ==
- Albert King – guitar, vocals
- Ike Turner – piano on "Don't Throw Your Love On Me So Strong"
- Harold White – tenor saxophone
- Wilbur Thompson – trumpet
- Freddie Robinette – baritone saxophone
- Lee Otis Right – bass
- Kenny Birdell Rice – drums
- Pierre Wooten – cover illustration
