= Montreux (disambiguation) =

Montreux is a municipality in Switzerland.

Montreux may also refer to:

- Montreux, Meurthe-et-Moselle, a town in France
- Montreux Convention Regarding the Regime of the Straits, an international agreement governing the passage of ships through the Bosphorus and Dardanelles Straits
- Montreux Document, a 2008 agreement between countries obligations regarding private military and security companies in war zones
- Montreux Record, a register of wetland sites on the List of Wetlands of International Importance

== Entertainment ==
- Montreux (band), a chamber jazz ensemble
- The Montreux EP by Simply Red
- Montreux Jazz Festival, an annual music festival held in Switzerland
- Montreux Festival (album), a blues album

== See also ==
- Live at Montreux (disambiguation)
