= Donald Kinsey =

American guitarist and singer (1953–2024)

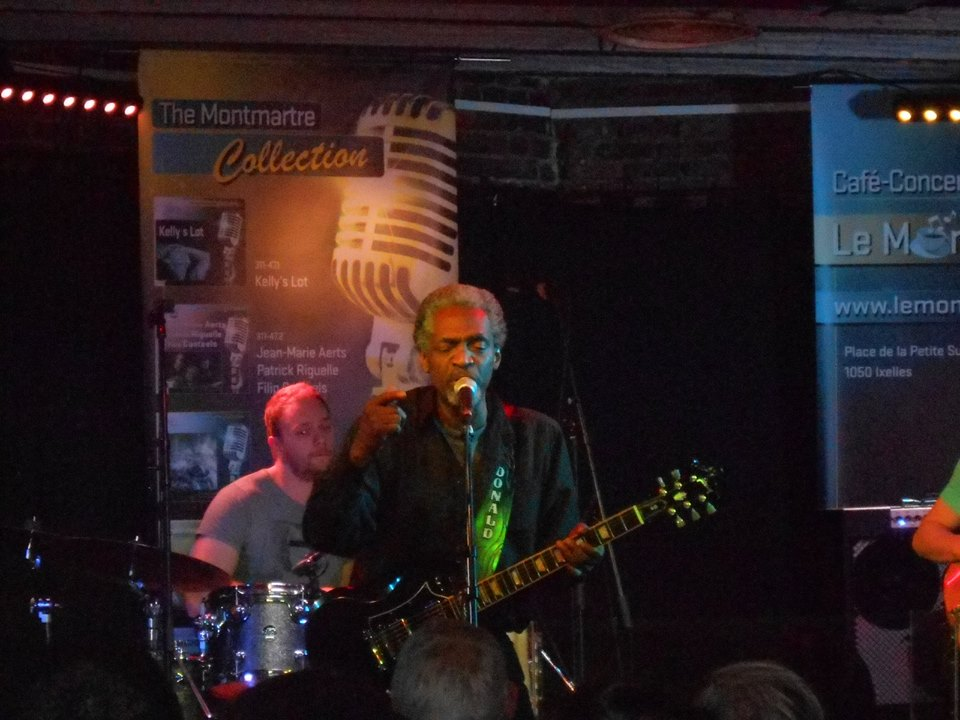
- Kinsey performing in 2014

Background information
- Born: May 12, 1953; Gary, Indiana, U.S.
- Died: February 6, 2024 (aged 70) Merrillville, Indiana, U.S.
- Genres: Blues, blues rock, reggae
- Occupations: Musician, songwriter, singer
- Instruments: Guitar, vocals
- Website: http://donaldkinsey.com/

Donald Kinsey (May 12, 1953 – February 6, 2024) was an American guitarist and singer, best known as a member of the Word Sound and Power Band, the reggae backing group for Peter Tosh.

== Biography ==
Donald Kinsey was one of three sons of Chicago blues performer, Big Daddy Kinsey. He was a member of the Kinsey Report, which he formed in 1984 with his brothers, Ralph Kinsey and Kenneth Kinsey, and Ron Prince. Previously he toured and recorded with Albert King, Peter Tosh, Bob Marley and the Wailers, and Roy Buchanan.

In 1976, days before the Smile Jamaica Concert in Kingston, Jamaica, would-be assassins attempted to murder Bob Marley at his home. The attempt took place during a Wailers rehearsal, while Kinsey was a member of The Wailers. Kinsey had just exited the rehearsal and was standing close to Marley and manager Don Taylor when shots were fired into that area of the house. As stated in Timothy White's Marley biography Catch a Fire: The Life of Bob Marley, Donald used a heavy road case as a shield against the gunfire and was not struck. Two days later, he performed with Marley at the outdoor concert.

In Kinsey's later years, while still regularly appearing with The Kinsey Report, he also toured the United States and Europe extensively with The Wailers Band, a reconstituted version of Bob Marley's backing band, often featuring musicians who had played with Marley in the 1970s. At most performances, Donald was given a feature spot to perform the reggae version of Chuck Berry's "Johnny B. Goode," as popularized by Marley's one-time bandmate, Peter Tosh. In interviews, Kinsey (a staunch Berry fan) recounted how he persuaded Tosh to record the song for his 1982 album Mama Africa, though Tosh at first resisted the idea. Kinsey is quoted as saying he and engineer Chris Kimsey created the fresh arrangement and recorded all of the backing track in Tosh's absence, and Peter arrived later, recording his vocal performance in a single take. The single version would become one of Tosh's biggest hits.

In 2020, The Wailers Band, including Donald, released One World, on Sony Music Latin. Produced by Emilio Estefan, One World was Grammy nominated in the category Best Reggae Album.

Kinsey died in Merrillville, Indiana, on February 6, 2024, at the age of 70. His death came just three weeks after the loss of his older brother, Ralph, who succumbed to cancer on January 17.

== Discography ==
=== With Albert King ===
- Live at the Fabulous Forum 1972
- Blues at Sunset
- Blues at Sunrise
- I Wanna Get Funky
- Funky London/Live at Wattstax

=== With White Lightnin' ===
- White Lightnin'

=== With Bob Marley ===
- Rastaman Vibration
- Live At The Roxy

=== With Burning Spear ===
- Dry & Heavy
- Marcus' Children

=== With Peter Tosh ===
- Bush Doctor
- Equal Rights
- Legalize It
- Mama Africa
- Captured Live
- Live & Dangerous
- Live At The One Love Peace Concert
- Live At The Jamaican World Music Festival

=== With Chosen Ones ===
- Reggae The Night Away [12"]
- Song For Bob [12"]

=== With Heavy Manners ===
- Heavier Than Now

=== With Betty Wright ===
- Wright Back At You

=== With Roy Buchanan ===
- Dancing On The Edge
- Hot Wires

=== With Big Daddy Kinsey ===
- Bad Situation
- Can't Let Go
- I Am The Blues
- Ramblin' Man

=== With The Kinsey Report ===
- Edge Of The City
- Midnight Drive
- Powerhouse
- Crossing Bridges
- Smoke & Steel
- Standing (I'll Be)

=== With Denroy Morgan ===
- Salvation

=== With Morgan Heritage ===
- Full Circle

=== With The Wailers Band ===
- One World

=== Singles ===
- "Jah Is Calling"/"Jah Children"
- "Sweet Emotion"
