= King Albert (album) =

Studio album by Albert King
- Released: 1977
- Recorded: 1977
- Studio: United Sound Systems, Inc., Detroit, MI
- Genre: Blues
- Length: 36:39
- Label: Tomato
- Producer: Don Davis

Albert King chronology
Truckload of Lovin' (1976)	King Albert (1977)	New Orleans Heat (1978)

Professional ratings
Review scores
Source	Rating
AllMusic	2/5 stars
The Penguin Guide to Blues Recordings	1.5/4 stars

King Albert is an album by the American blues musician Albert King, released by Tomato Records in 1977. The singles "Call My Job" and "Chump Change" took 72nd and 72nd place, respectively, in the Billboard R&B Singles chart.

The album was recorded at United Sound Systems in Detroit and produced by Don Davis.

== Background ==
The album was made during King's later career and features a return to a more traditional electric blues sound. Supported by a Detroit-based backing band, King performs a mix of blues and soul-influenced material that highlights his distinctive guitar style and vocals.

Although the album did not achieve major commercial success, it demonstrated Albert King's continued influence in the blues genre.

== Critical reception ==
In AllMusic, Thom Owens said: "Rebounding slightly from the nadir of Albert, Albert King delivered King Albert, a record that at least sticks to the tough, soul-inflected blues that made his reputation. Granted, the sound of the album is entirely too polished, but there is genuine grit in the performances and some strong songs, such as "You Upset Me Baby" and "Good Time Charlie," on the record. That may be enough for some hardcore fans to give a listen, but they should be forewarned that even those inspired moments aren't enough to make King Albert a worthwhile release."

== Track listing ==
No.	Title	Writer(s)	Length
1.	"Love Shock"	Little Sonny	4:40
2.	"You Upset Me Baby"	Maxwell Davis, Joe Josea, B.B. King, Jules Taub	4:15
3.	"Chump Change"	Eric Morgeson, Barry Murphy	3:40
4.	"Let Me Rock You Easy"	Norma Toney	4:56
5.	"Boot Lace"	Don Davis, William Mueller	5:55
6.	"Love Mechanic"	Sonny, Aaron Willis	4:01
7.	"Call My Job"	Detroit Junior, Al Perkins	4:27
8.	"Good Time Charlie"	Gilbert Caples, Deadric Malone, Willie Schofield	4:45
