= Big Daddy Kinsey =

American Chicago blues musician

Lester J. Kinsey Jr., (March 18, 1927 – April 3, 2001) known as Big Daddy Kinsey, was an American Chicago blues singer, guitarist and harmonica player.

He was born near Pleasant Grove, Mississippi. He grew up playing gospel music; his father was a pastor in the Church of God in Christ and disapproved of blues music. However, Kinsey started playing guitar at parties in Mississippi, before moving in 1944 to Gary, Indiana, where he worked in a steel mill. He married and served in the military before returning to work in Gary and raising a family.

In the late 1950s, he started a family band, Big Daddy Kinsey and His Fabulous Sons, with his children, but it dissolved in the early 1970s, and Lester Kinsey began playing harmonica with a local band, the Soul Brothers. His second son, guitarist Donald Kinsey, played in Albert King's band in the 1970s, and later joined Bob Marley and the Wailers, but in 1984 rejoined his father and brothers Ralph and Kenneth to form The Kinsey Report. The band featured Lester "Big Daddy" Kinsey as slide guitarist and harmonica player. They signed for the Rooster Blues label, and in 1985 with Alligator Records, becoming "one of the hottest attractions in contemporary blues". In the early 1990s Kinsey recorded the album I Am the Blues, featuring such musicians as Buddy Guy, James Cotton, and Pinetop Perkins.

As well as leading his band, Lester Kinsey also established a bus company running charter trips to casinos in the southern States. He developed prostate cancer, and died in Gary in 2001 aged 74. His sons have continued to perform as The Kinsey Report.

== Albums ==
- 1985: Bad Situation
- 1990: Can't Let Go
- 1993: I Am the Blues
- 1995: Ramblin' Man
