= Wednesday Night in San Francisco =

Live album by Albert King
- Released: 1990
- Recorded: June 26, 1968
- Venue: Fillmore Auditorium, San Francisco
- Genre: Blues
- Length: 43:21
- Label: Stax
- Producer: Al Jackson Jr.

Albert King chronology
Door to Door (1990)	Wednesday Night in San Francisco (1990)	Thursday Night in San Francisco (1990)

Professional ratings
Review scores
Source	Rating
AllMusic	4.5/5 stars
The Penguin Guide to Blues Recordings	3/4 stars

Wednesday Night in San Francisco is a blues album by Albert King, recorded live in 1968 at the Fillmore Auditorium. This album, together with Thursday Night in San Francisco, contains leftovers recorded live on the same dates as Live Wire/Blues Power. Wednesday Night in San Francisco, released in 1990, contains material recorded on June 26, 1968.

== Track listing ==
Wednesday Night in San Francisco
No.	Title	Writer(s)	Length
1.	"Watermelon Man"	Herbie Hancock	0:44
2.	"Why You So Mean to Me"	Albert King	7:55
3.	"I Get Evil"	King	5:25
4.	"Got to Be Some Changes Made"	King	9:24
5.	"Personal Manager"	King, David Porter	7:21
6.	"Born Under a Bad Sign"	William Bell, Booker T. Jones	4:08
7.	"Don't Throw Your Love On Me So Strong"	King	8:24
Total length:			43:21

== Personnel ==
- Albert King – electric guitar, vocals
- Willie James Exon – guitar
- James Washington – organ
- Roosevelt Pointer – bass
- Theotis Morgan – drums
