= Hard Bargain (Albert King album) =

Studio album by Albert King
- Released: 1996
- Recorded: 1966–1972
- Genre: Blues
- Length: 46:29
- Label: Stax Records

Albert King chronology
Mean Mean Blues (1995)	Hard Bargain (1996)	Born Under A Bad Sign & Other Hits (1997)

Professional ratings
Review scores
Source	Rating
AllMusic	2.5/5 stars
The Penguin Guide to Blues Recordings	2.5/4 stars

Hard Bargain is a blues album by Albert King, released in 1996 with outtakes and previously unreleased material recorded between 1966 and 1972.

== Track listing ==
1. "Overall Junction" (King) – 2:19
2. "Funk-Shun" (King) – 3:43
3. "You Sure Drive a Hard Bargain" (Crutcher, Jones) – 3:17
4. "You're Gonna Need Me" (King) – 2:48
5. "As the Years Go Passing By" (Deadric Malone) – 2:49
6. "Drownin' on Dry Land" (Gregory, Jones) – 4:23
7. "Heart Fixing Business" (Banks, Jones) – 3:26
8. "The Sky Is Crying" (Elmore James) – 5:29
9. "I Get Evil" (King) – 3:29
10. "Shake 'Em Down" (Nix) – 3:09
11. "I Believe to My Soul" (Charles) – 4:36
12. "Got to Be Some Changes Made" (King) – 4:29
13. "Albert's Groove, No. 2" (King) – 2:32

== Personnel ==
- Albert King – Electric guitar and vocals
- Booker T. Jones – Piano and Organ
- Isaac Hayes – Piano
- Steve Cropper – Guitar
- Donald Dunn – Bass
- Al Jackson Jr. – drums
