= Live Wire/Blues Power =

Live Wire / Blues Power

Live album by Albert King
- Released: November 1968
- Recorded: June 26 & 27, 1968
- Venue: Fillmore Auditorium, San Francisco
- Genre: Blues
- Length: 38:16
- Label: Stax
- Producer: Al Jackson Jr.

Albert King chronology
| Born Under a Bad Sign (1967) | Live Wire / Blues Power (1968) | Years Gone By (1969) |

Professional ratings
Review scores
| Source | Rating |
|---|---|
| AllMusic | 4.5/5 stars |
| The Encyclopedia of Popular Music | 4/5 stars |
| Mojo | 4/5 stars |
| MusicHound Rock: The Essential Album Guide | 4/5 stars |
| The Penguin Guide to Blues Recordings | 2.5/4 stars |
| The Rolling Stone Album Guide | 3/5 stars |

Live Wire/Blues Power is a blues album by Albert King. It was recorded live in 1968 at the Fillmore Auditorium. Leftovers from the recordings were released on the albums Wednesday Night in San Francisco and Thursday Night in San Francisco.

The album peaked at No. 150 on the Billboard 200.

== Production ==
The album was produced by Al Jackson Jr.

== Critical reception ==
Rolling Stone called the album "one man’s reworking of a classic format to make an intensely personal statement, invoking all the cliches without becoming for one second a cliche itself." The Encyclopedia of Popular Music deemed it a "classic [that] introduced [King's] music to the white rock audience."

== Track listing ==
1. "Watermelon Man" (Herbie Hancock) – 4:04
2. "Blues Power" (Albert King) – 10:18
3. "Night Stomp" (Raymond Jackson, King) – 5:49
4. "Blues at Sunrise" (King) – 8:44
5. "Please Love Me" (B.B. King, Jules Taub) – 4:01
6. "Look Out" (King) – 5:20

== Personnel ==
- Albert King – electric guitar, vocals
- Willie James Exon – guitar
- James Washington – organ
- Roosevelt Pointer – bass
- Theotis Morgan – drums

Technical

- Bill Halverson, Ron Capone – engineer
- Ivan Nagy – cover photograph

== Charts ==
Chart performance for Live Wire/Blues Power
| Chart (2024) | Peak position |
|---|---|
| Croatian International Albums (HDU) | 33 |
