= Thursday Night in San Francisco =

Live album by Albert King
- Released: 1990
- Recorded: June 27, 1968
- Venue: Fillmore Auditorium, San Francisco
- Genre: Blues
- Length: 54:33
- Label: Stax
- Producer: Al Jackson Jr.

Albert King chronology
Wednesday Night in San Francisco (1990)	Thursday Night in San Francisco (1990)	Albert (1992)

Professional ratings
Review scores
Source	Rating
AllMusic	3.5/5 stars
The Penguin Guide to Blues Recordings	3/4 stars

Thursday Night in San Francisco is a blues album by Albert King, recorded live in 1968 at the Fillmore Auditorium. This album, together with Wednesday Night in San Francisco, contains leftovers recorded live on the same dates as Live Wire/Blues Power. Thursday Night in San Francisco, released in 1990, contains material recorded on June 27, 1968.

== Track listing ==
1. "San-Ho-Zay" (Freddie King, Sonny Thompson) – 0:53
2. "You Upset Me, Baby" (B.B. King, Jules Taub) – 4:53
3. "Stormy Monday" (T-Bone Walker) – 8:37
4. "Every Day I Have the Blues" (Peter Chatman) – 4:17
5. "Drifting Blues" (Charles Brown, Johnny Moore, Eddie Williams) – 8:05
6. "I've Made Nights By Myself" (Albert King) – 6:44
7. "Crosscut Saw" (R.G. Ford) – 3:46
8. "I'm Gonna Move to the Outskirts of Town" (Andy Razaf, Casey Bill Weldon) – 7:41
9. "Ooh-ee baby" (Albert King) – 7:40

== Personnel ==
- Albert King – electric guitar, vocals
- Willie James Exon – guitar
- James Washington – organ
- Roosevelt Pointer – bass
- Theotis Morgan – drums
