= Hard Bargain (Charlottesville, Virginia) =

Historic house in Virginia, United States

- U.S. National Register of Historic Places
- Virginia Landmarks Register
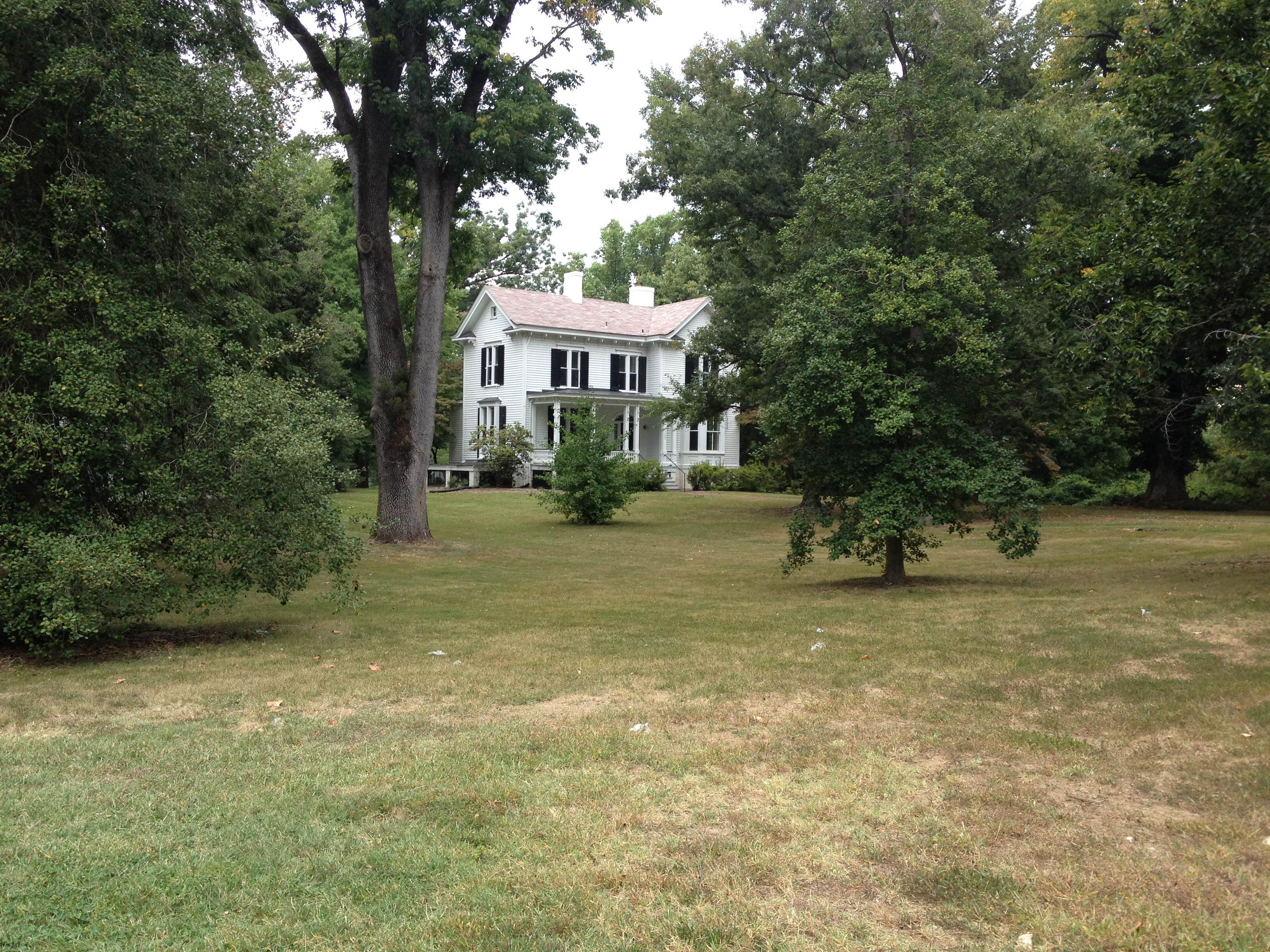

- Location within Virginia Location within the United States
- Location: 1105 Park St., Charlottesville, Virginia
- Coordinates: 38°2′34″N 78°28′17″W
- Area: 3.5 acres (1.4 ha)
- Built: 1878
- Architectural style: Late Victorian
- MPS: Charlottesville MRA
- NRHP reference No.: 84003521
- VLR No.: 104-0210

Significant dates
- Added to NRHP: January 10, 1984
- Designated VLR: October 20, 1981

Hard Bargain is a historic home located at Charlottesville, Virginia. It was built in 1878, and is a two-story, three-bay, Late Victorian style frame dwelling. It is sheathed in weatherboard and sits on a brick English basement. It has a large two-story rear addition (1890s), one-story bay window, and projecting end pavilion. Also on the property are the contributing stone foundation of an old barn and the remains of a mill on Schenk's Branch.

It was listed on the National Register of Historic Places in 1984.
