= Live at Montreux =

Live at Montreux is the name of live concert releases from Montreux Sounds and Eagle Vision, on CD and/or DVD, by various musicians, usually referring to recordings at the Montreux Jazz Festival:

- Tori Amos: Live at Montreux 1991/1992
- The Atlantic Family Live at Montreux (1978)
- Dennis Brown (1957–1999): Live at Montreux
- James Brown (1933–2005): Live at Montreux 1981
- Johnny Cash (1932–2003): Live at Montreux 1994 (DVD)
- Ray Charles (1930–2004): Live at Montreux 1997
- The Chieftains: Live at Montreux 1997 (DVD)
- Eric Clapton (born 1945): Live at Montreux 1986
- Phil Collins (born 1951): Live at Montreux
- Alice Cooper: Live at Montreux (CD/DVD)
- Miles Davis & Quincy Jones: Miles & Quincy Live at Montreux
- Deep Purple:
  - Live at Montreux 1996
  - Live at Montreux 2006
  - Live at Montreux 2011
- Mink DeVille: Live at Montreaux 1982
- Dr. John (1941–2019): Live at Montreux 1995 (DVD)
- The Dubliners: Live at Montreux
- Steve Earle: Live at Montreux 2005
- Bill Evans (1929–1980): Live at Montreux
- Rachelle Ferrell (born 1964): Live in Montreux 1991–97
- Rory Gallagher: Live at Montreux
- Andrew Hill: Live at Montreux
- John Lee Hooker: Live at Montreux 1983 & 1990
- Bobbi Humphrey: Live at Montreux
- Bobby Hutcherson: Bobby Hutcherson Live at Montreux
- Bob James (born 1939): Live at Montreux
- Jamiroquai: Live at Montreux 2003 (DVD)
- Jethro Tull: Live At Montreux 2003 (2CD/DVD)
- King Sunny Adé (born 1946): Live at Montreux 1982
- Rahsaan Roland Kirk: I, Eye, Aye: Live at the Montreux Jazz Festival, 1972
- Korn: Korn: Live in Montreux 2004 (DVD)
- Charles Lloyd: Montreux 82
- Paco de Lucía & John McLaughlin: Paco and John Live at Montreux 1987
- Paco de Lucía: The Montreux Years (tracks #3, #4 and #6)
- Gary Moore:
  - Gary Moore & The Midnight Blues Band – Live at Montreux 1990
  - Live at Montreux 2010
- Les McCann: Live at Montreux
- Carmen McRae (1922–1994): Live at Montreux
- Mingus Dynasty: Live at Montreux
- Modern Jazz Quartet: Together Again: Live at the Montreux Jazz Festival '82 (Pablo, 1982)
- Alanis Morissette: Live at Montreux 2012
- Van Morrison: Live at Montreux 1980/1974
- Mike Oldfield: Live at Montreux 1981
- Rockpile: Live at Montreux 1980
- Nile Rodgers & Chic: Live at Montreux 2004
- Peter Tosh (1944–1987): Live at Montreux 1979
- Bonnie Raitt (born 1949): Live at Montreux 1977 (DVD)
- Run-DMC: Live at Montreux 2001
- Marlena Shaw: Live at Montreux
- Nina Simone (1933–2003): Live at Montreux 1976 (DVD)
- Sun Ra: Live at Montreux
- Stevie Ray Vaughan: Live at Montreux 1982 & 1985
- Stone the Crows: Live in Montreux 1972
- Suzanne Vega (born 1959): Live at Montreux 2004 (DVD)
- Wu-Tang Clan: Live at Montreux 2007
- Yes: Live at Montreux 2003
- ZZ Top: Live at Montreux 2013
