= I Wanna Get Funky =

Studio album by Albert King
- Released: 1974
- Recorded: 1972
- Genres: Electric blues, funk
- Length: 46:00
- Label: Stax
- Producers: Henry Bush, Allen Jones

Albert King chronology
Blues at Sunrise (1973)	I Wanna Get Funky (1974)	Montreux Festival (1974)

Professional ratings
Review scores
Source	Rating
AllMusic	2.5/5 stars
The Penguin Guide to Blues Recordings	3/4 stars

I Wanna Get Funky is the eighth studio album by Albert King, covering various blues tunes with heavy funk overtones, recorded in 1972 and released in 1974. With a rhythm section led by the Bar-Kays and horn arrangements by the Memphis Horns, it is considered by AllMusic as a "another very solid, early-'70s outing".

== Artwork ==
In the artwork, Albert King is seen smoking and playing the guitar.

== Critical reception ==
In Allmusic, Steve Counsel gave I Wanna Get Funky 5 out of 5 stars, calling it "The Album I Wanna Get Funky has some of Alberts best (studio) recorded guitar solos, the band is funky, the songs are soulful, the production beautiful, what an incredible record. It sounds just as good as it did when I first heard it in a record both in a soho record shop as a teenager, I felt I was transported to a sweaty club in the South, Albert blew my mind then and he still does, his playing has such authority he speaks through it in a profound way! No one played like Albert, Stevie Ray Vaughan tried but Jimi took him somewhere else, Albert laid claim to rites of his name on this disc but he didn't shout about it he let others hail him as the King of the blues."

== Track listing ==
1. "I Wanna Get Funky" (Carl Smith) – 4:08
2. "Playing on Me" (Sir Mack Rice) – 3:25
3. "Walking the Back Streets and Crying" (Sandy Jones) – 6:28
4. "'Til My Back Ain't Got No Bone" (Eddie Floyd, Alvertis Isbell) – 7:32
5. "Flat Tire" (Henry Bush, Booker T. Jones, Albert King) – 4:43
6. "I Can't Hear Nothing But the Blues" (Henry Bush, Dave Clark) – 4:16
7. "Travelin' Man" (Albert King) – 2:52
8. "Crosscut Saw" (R.G. Ford) – 7:45
9. "That's What the Blues Is All About" (Bobby Patterson, Jerry Strickland) – 3:53

== Personnel ==
- Albert King – electric guitar, vocals
- Donald Kinsey (name on album credits incorrectly spelled as "Donald Kenzie") – rhythm guitar
- Memphis Symphony Orchestra – strings
- The Memphis Horns – horns
- The Bar-Kays & The Movement – rhythm section
- Hot Buttered Soul, Henry Bush – backing vocals
- Lester Snell – arrangements
- Dale Warren – arrangement on "Walking the Back Streets and Crying"

Technical

- Daryl Williams, Robert Jackson, William C. Brown III – engineer
- Maldwin Hamlin – photography
