= Don't Throw Your Love on Me So Strong =

Single by Albert King
- B-side: "This Morning"
- Released: October 1961 (Bobbin); November 1961 (King)
- Genre: Blues
- Length: 2:55
- Label: Bobbin; King
- Songwriter: Albert King

Albert King singles chronology
"I Walked All Night Long" (1961)	"Don't Throw Your Love on Me So Strong" (1961)	"Travelin' to California" (1961)

Professional ratings
Review scores
Source	Rating
Billboard	4/4 stars

"Don't Throw Your Love on Me So Strong" is a blues song written and recorded by Albert King. The song was first released on Bobbin Records, but it became King's first hit record after its release on King Records in 1961.

== Recording and release ==
King recorded "Don't Throw Your Love on Me So Strong" in St. Louis with Ike Turner on piano. It was originally released on Little Milton's St. Louis-based label, Bobbin Records, in October 1961. When the record sold well locally, it was leased to King Records and reissued in November 1961. The song became Albert King's first hit single. It reached No. 14 on the Billboard R&B chart and No. 34 on the Cash Box R&B chart in December 1961.

The song appeared on King's debut album The Big Blues, released on King Records in 1962.

== Chart performance ==
Chart (1961)	Peak position
US Billboard Hot R&B Sides	14
US Cash Box Top 50 R&B	34
