= Hardbargain =

Village in South Trinidad

Coordinates: 10°19′04″N 61°21′15″W

Hardbargain or Hard Bargain is a village on the island of Trinidad in the Caribbean country Trinidad and Tobago. It is situated on the southern edge of the Central Range.

Hardbargain has a Hindu Mandir called the Triveni Mandir aka the Sisters Road Hindu Temple. This establishment has been in existence since the 1960s. The current structure was officially opened in November 2002. The Triveni Mandir offers a forum to learn various aspects of the Hindu culture and tradition, such as Bhajan singing, Indian dance, Indian music, Chowtaal singing, etc. Hardbargain also has a Roman Catholic school.

The members of the Hardbargain Village Council are the 2006 first-place winners of The Prime Minister's Best Village Trophy Competition in the Devotional and Chutney singing categories.
