= The Fillmore =

Historic music venue in San Francisco, California

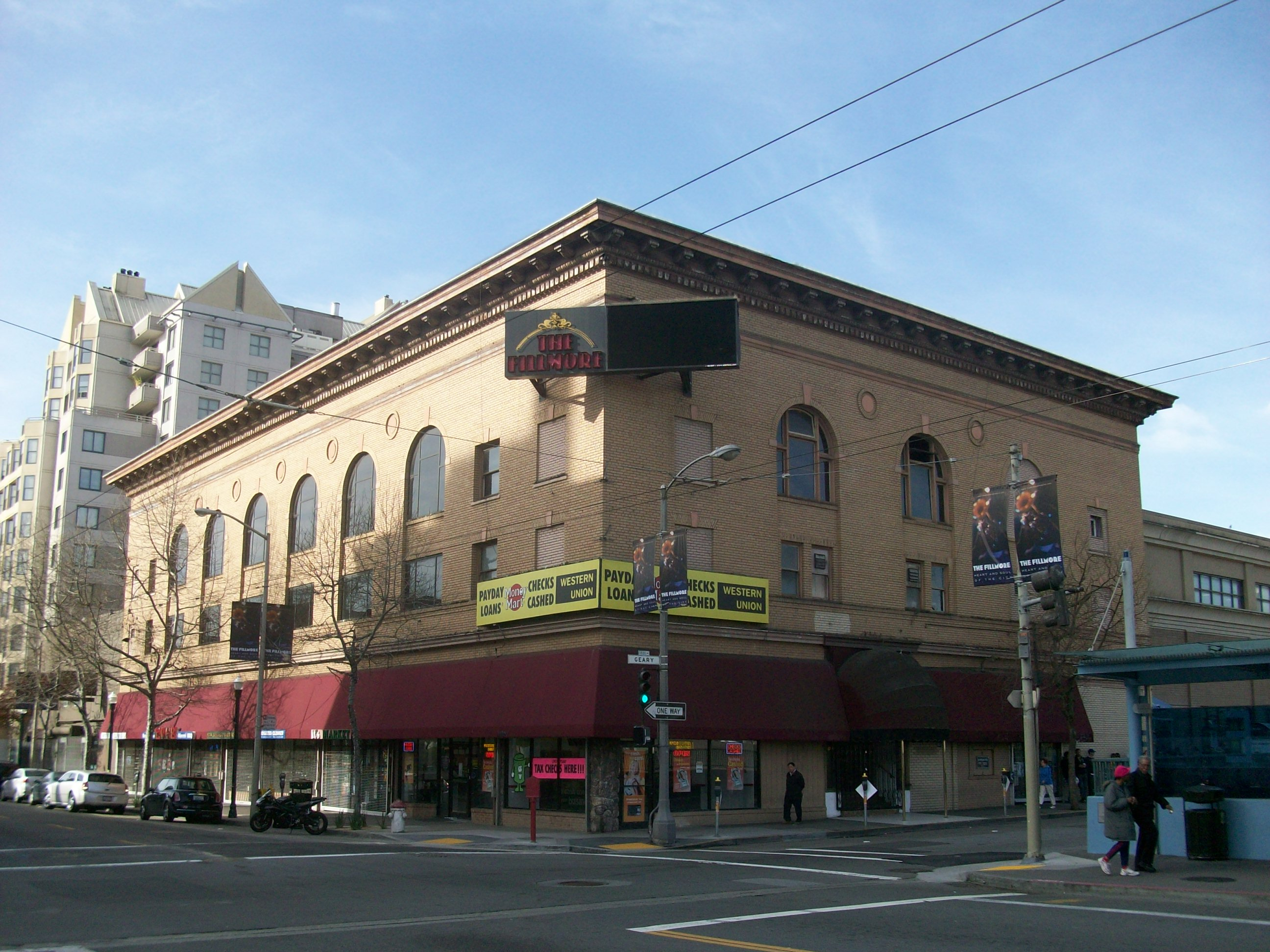
- The Fillmore in 2010

- Location within San Francisco Location within California
- Former names: Majestic Hall
- Address: 1805 Geary Boulevard
- Location: San Francisco, California, United States
- Coordinates: 37.784098°N 122.433132°W
- Owner: Kortz/Bragin Family
- Capacity: 1,315

Construction
- Built: 1912

Website
- thefillmore.com

The Fillmore is a historic music venue in San Francisco, California.

Built in 1912 and originally named the Majestic Hall, it became the Fillmore Auditorium in 1954. It is in Western Addition, on the edge of the Fillmore District and Upper Fillmore neighborhood.

Since 2007, it has been operated by American events promoter and venue operator Live Nation, which has since named new clubs and renamed existing ones after the Fillmore.

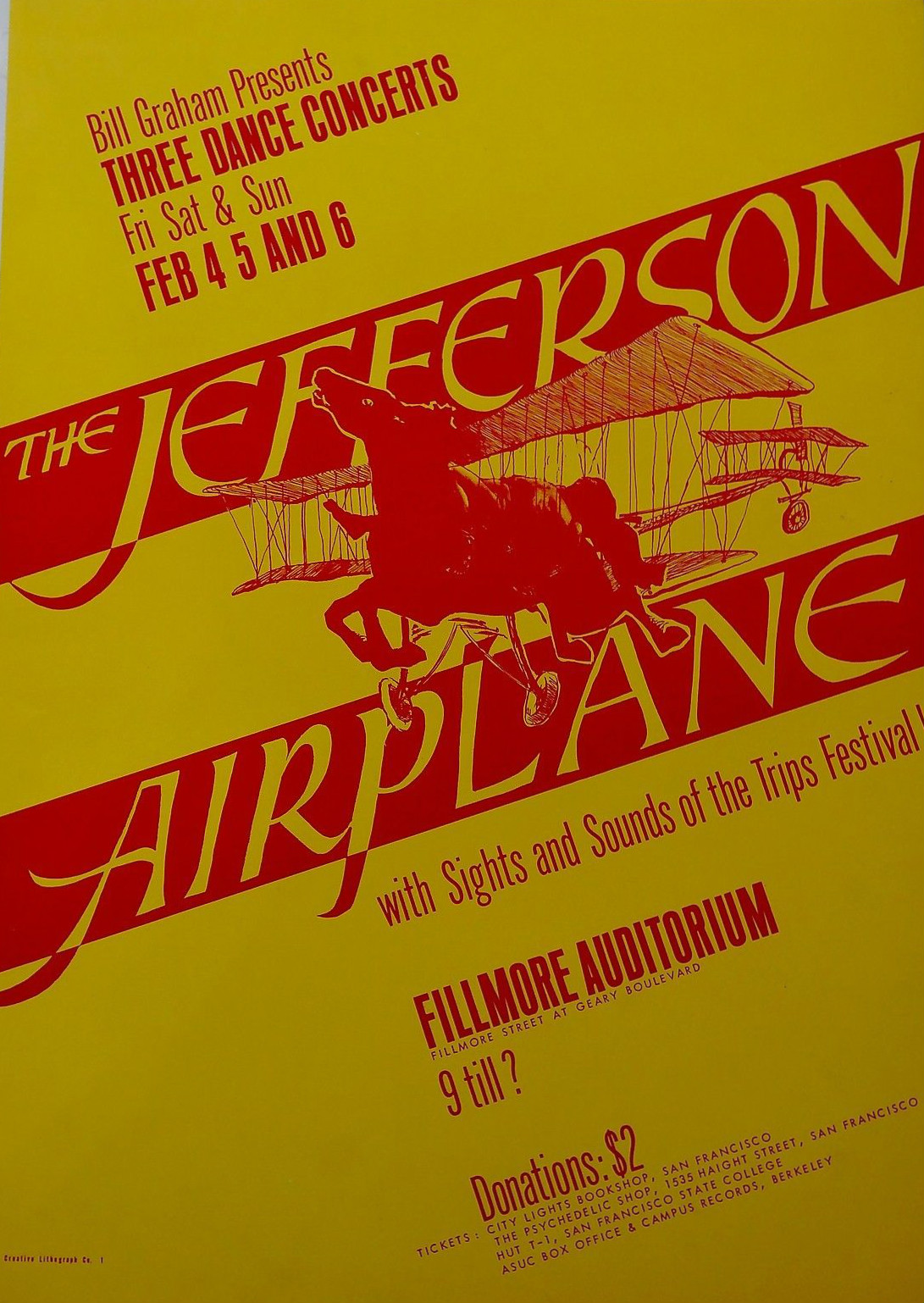
Jefferson Airplane Fillmore poster, February 1966. This was the first non-benefit concert held at the venue.

== History ==
The building which became The Fillmore was built in 1912 and initially housed the Majestic Hall and Academy of Dancing. Its name was changed from the Majestic Hall in 1936 to the Ambassador Dance Hall. From 1939 to 1952, it operated as the Ambassador Roller Skating Rink.

"In 1954, Sullivan took over the lease on a dilapidated dance hall and roller rink named the Majestic Ballroom and christened it the Fillmore Auditorium, hosting integrated dances and booking the biggest names in Black music." - SFGate

In 1954, Charles Sullivan, one of the most successful African-American businessmen in San Francisco at the time, started booking bands and renamed the venue The Fillmore Auditorium. He was the first to allow black attendees there. Charles became the most successful concert promoter on the west coast introducing the biggest black acts to the San Francisco concert scene, such as James Brown, Ike & Tina Turner, Louis Armstrong, Jimi Hendrix, Billie Holiday, and more. In December 1965, Sullivan let Bill Graham use his dance hall permit to book a benefit for the San Francisco Mime Troupe. After that Graham continued to book shows there on dates Sullivan wasn't using the space. In their contract agreement it was stated that Graham would take over the Fillmore if anything unforeseen happened to Sullivan. Sullivan was found shot to death in the early morning hours of August 2, 1966, at the age of 57, the case was never solved even after Senator Diane Feinstein's attempt to reopen the investigation.

On May 27, 28 and 29, 1966, The Velvet Underground and Nico played the Fillmore Auditorium as part of Andy Warhol's Exploding Plastic Inevitable avant-garde multimedia show. Their light show engineer Danny Williams, who pioneered many of today's standard practices in rock music light shows, built a light system at the Fillmore that included stroboscopes, slides and film projections onstage. The system was partially inspired by Jonas Mekas' earlier film projections at concerts held at The Cinematheque in New York. As conceived by Warhol and Williams, the show also included wild, free dancing both in the crowd and onstage. Although The Velvet Underground's proto-punk aesthetics failed to resonate with the incipient San Francisco counterculture, Graham retained Williams to build additional light systems. These innovations were to become part of the Fillmore Auditorium's prestige and image and served as the basis for the systems subsequently used at the Fillmore East and Fillmore West venues.

In the mid-1960s, the Fillmore Auditorium became the focal point for psychedelic music and the counterculture in general, with such acts as the Grateful Dead, the Steve Miller Band, Jefferson Airplane, Quicksilver Messenger Service, Moby Grape, the Doors, Jimi Hendrix Experience, the Byrds, Big Brother and the Holding Company, Santana, Frank Zappa's the Mothers of Invention, and British acts the Who, Cream, and Pink Floyd all performing at the venue. Besides rock, Graham also featured non-rock acts such as Lenny Bruce, Miles Davis, Rahsaan Roland Kirk, Charles Lloyd, Aretha Franklin, and Otis Redding as well as poetry readings. The Grateful Dead played a total of 51 concerts at the venue from 1965 through 1969.

B.B. King's well-received performances at the venue served to introduce many fans to the authentic sounds that inspired the blues rock subgenre. He subsequently became a countercultural icon, appearing at many rock festivals. Albert King also played a series of well-received shows here in 1968, with one of them being released as his first live album Live Wire/Blues Power. Eventually, two additional shows would be released as Wednesday Night in San Francisco and Thursday Night in San Francisco.

The venue was known for its ambience as well as for the musical performances, often with swirling light-show projections, strobe lights and uninhibited dancing. The cultural impact of the Fillmore was very large. It is referenced by Hunter S. Thompson in his 1971 novel Fear and Loathing in Las Vegas in a description of the counterculture of the 1960s in the San Francisco Bay Area.

== Fillmore West, Fillmore East and the New Old Fillmore ==
In the summer of 1968, the continuing socioeconomic deterioration of the surrounding neighborhood and the modest capacity of the venue compelled Graham to abandon the Fillmore Auditorium only two years after his famous association with the venue commenced. That July, he assumed ownership of the Carousel Ballroom at nearby 10 South Van Ness Avenue. The venue had been previously managed as a cooperative venture for several months by the Grateful Dead, Jefferson Airplane and other Bay Area groups. The Carousel subsequently operated as the Fillmore West, paralleling Graham's Fillmore East in New York City's East Village. However, both venues were shuttered by Graham in July 1971 as arena bookings on popular music tours became increasingly prevalent.

For an indeterminate period from 1969 to 1970, the Fillmore Auditorium was operated by new management as the New Old Fillmore; during this period, the Grateful Dead and The Stooges performed at the venue.

== The Elite Club ==
The original Fillmore location became a venue called The Elite Club. For several years in the early 1980s, punk promoters Paul Rat and Wes Robinson booked punk rock shows at this venue. Punk bands that performed at The Elite Club include Crucifix, Discharge, 45 Grave, FEAR, D.O.A, Verbal Abuse, Social Distortion, Bad Religion, Black Flag, Bad Brains, Dead Kennedys, Red Rockers, T.S.O.L., Flipper, Gang of Four, and Public Image Ltd.

== Reopening and national franchise ==
The Fillmore reopened under Graham's management in the mid-1980s, but it was damaged and closed by the Loma Prieta earthquake of October 1989. After Graham died in a helicopter crash in 1991, those close to him decided to carry out his final wish to retrofit and reopen the original Fillmore, which required much structural work. The Fillmore reopened on April 27, 1994, with the band The Smashing Pumpkins playing an unannounced surprise show, and Primus playing the first official reopening show the following night. The Fillmore has once again become a San Francisco hot spot with frequent shows. For a standard show, the capacity of the Fillmore is 1,315 guests.

Since 2007, the Fillmore is leased and operated by Live Nation.

Live Nation has since named several of its existing and new clubs after the Fillmore. This includes clubs in Denver, Detroit, Philadelphia, and the Fillmore at the Jackie Gleason Theater in Miami Beach, Florida. The Fillmore Charlotte opened in June 2009. A Fillmore in the Washington, D.C., suburb of Silver Spring, Maryland, broke ground in 2010 and opened in late 2011. The 2,000-seat Fillmore New Orleans opened in 2019 on the second floor of Harrah's New Orleans casino. The Central, Minneapolis Fillmore venue opened in February 2020.

The Fillmore brand was also attached to Irving Plaza in New York City from 2007 to 2010.

=== Locations ===
==== Current ====
Venue name	Metro vicinity	Location	Address	Opened	Capacity	Notes
The Fillmore	San Francisco Bay Area	Fillmore District	1805 Geary Blvd; San Francisco, CA 94115-3519	1954	1,315	Known as the "Elite Club" during the 1980s
Fillmore Auditorium	Denver Metro	Capitol Hill	1510 Clarkson St; Denver, CO 80210-2702	February 1999	3,900	Formerly known as the "Mammoth Events Center"
The Fillmore Detroit	Metro Detroit	Detroit Theatre District	2115 Woodward Ave; Detroit, MI 48201-3469	June 13, 2007	2,900	Formerly known as the "State Theatre", and the "Palms Theatre"
The Fillmore Miami Beach	Miami metropolitan area	City Center	1700 Washington Ave; Miami Beach, FL 33139-7540	October 10, 2007	3,230	Historically known as the "Jackie Gleason Theatre"
The Fillmore Charlotte	Metrolina	AvidxChange Music Factory	820 Hamilton St; Charlotte, NC 28206-2924	June 19, 2009	2,000	The smaller venue, "The Underground", seats 800
The Fillmore Silver Spring	Washington metropolitan area	Downtown Silver Spring	8656 Colesville Rd; Silver Spring, MD 20910-3915	September 8, 2011	2,000	-
The Fillmore Philadelphia	Greater Philadelphia	Fishtown	29 E Allen St; Philadelphia, PA 19123-1753	October 1, 2015	2,500	The smaller venue, "The Foundry", seats 450, built in the former Ajax Metal Company Plant.
The Fillmore New Orleans	Greater New Orleans	Central Business Dist.	6 Canal St; New Orleans, LA 70130-1641	February 18, 2019	2,200	Located on the second floor of Harrah's New Orleans.
The Fillmore Minneapolis	Twin Cities	North Loop	521 N 5th St; Minneapolis, MN 55401-3366	February 12, 2020	1,850	Located near Target Field.

==== Former ====
Venue name	Metro vicinity	Location	Address	Opened	Capacity	Notes
Fillmore West	San Francisco Bay Area	South of Market	10 S Van Ness Ave; San Francisco, CA 94103-1227	1968	3,000	Closed in 1971
Fillmore East	New York metropolitan area	East Village	105 2nd Ave; New York City, NY 10003-8380	1968	2,654	Closed in 1971
The Fillmore at TLA	Greater Philadelphia	Queen Village	334 South St; Philadelphia, PA 19147-1536	2007	1,000	Returned to its original name, "Theatre of Living Arts", in 2008
Fillmore New York at Irving Plaza	New York metropolitan area	Union Square	17 Irving Plaza; New York City, NY 10003-2392	2007	1,200	Returned to its original name, "Irving Plaza", in 2010

== Traditions ==
The Fillmore is also well known for its psychedelic concert posters by artists who in the 1960s included Wes Wilson and Rick Griffin. Copies of the night's poster are given to fans free of charge as they exit selected, sold-out shows. A collection of these posters is displayed in the auditorium’s upstairs rooms.

Other traditions are carried on to this day at the Fillmore in San Francisco. One is the provision of free apples to concertgoers, a tradition started by Graham. Another is a "greeter" who welcomes each guest as they enter with: "Welcome to the Fillmore!"

== See also ==
- House of Blues
