= I'm in a Phone Booth, Baby =

Studio album by Albert King
- Released: 1984
- Recorded: January 1984
- Studios: Fantasy, Berkeley, CA
- Genre: Blues
- Length: 38:01
- Label: Fantasy
- Producers: Albert King; Tony Llorens; Jim Stewart

Albert King chronology
Crosscut Saw: Albert King in San Francisco (1983)	I'm in a Phone Booth, Baby (1984)	The Best of Albert King (1986)

Professional ratings
Review scores
Source	Rating
AllMusic	3/5 stars
The Encyclopedia of Popular Music	3/5 stars
MusicHound Rock: The Essential Album Guide	3/5 stars
The Penguin Guide to Blues Recordings	3/4 stars

I'm in a Phone Booth, Baby is an album by the American blues musician Albert King. It was released in 1984 by Fantasy Records. The album was nominated for a Grammy Award for "Best Traditional Blues Recording".

== Background ==
By the early 1980s, King was established as one of the most influential electric blues guitarists, known for his work during the 1960s and 1970s, particularly with Stax Records. I'm in a Phone Booth, Baby was recorded in January 1984 at Fantasy Studios in Berkeley, California, during a period when King was focusing on studio work rather than commercial releases.

The album contains a mix of classic blues standards and newer compositions. The title track was written by Robert Cray, Richard Cousins, Michael Vannice, and Dennis Walker. It highlighted King's openness to contemporary blues songwriting while maintaining his signature guitar style.

The album remains rooted in traditional blues themes such as loss, longing, and resilience, supported by horn arrangements and a polished studio production typical of early-1980s blues recordings. Despite its modest commercial impact, the album was well received within blues circles.

== Track listing ==
1. "Phone Booth" (Richard Cousins, Robert Cray, Mike Vannice, Dennis Walker) - 3:54
2. "Dust My Broom " (Elmore James, Robert Johnson) - 3:57
3. "The Sky Is Crying" (James, Clarence Lewis, Morgan Robinson) - 5:39
4. "Brother, Go Ahead and Take Her" (Dennis Walker) - 4:28
5. "Your Bread Ain't Done" (Doug MacLeod) - 3:57
6. "Firing Line (I Don't Play with Your Woman, You Don't Play with Mind)" (Sir Mack Rice) - 3:26
7. "The Game Goes On" (Edward Early) - 3:26
8. "Truck Load of Lovin'" (Jimmy Lewis) - 4:19
9. "You Gotta Sacrifice" (Michael Llorens) - 4:20

== Personnel ==
- Albert King – lead guitar, vocals
- Gus Thornton – bass
- Tony Llorens – piano
- Michael Llorens – drums
- Steve Douglas – tenor and baritone saxophone
- Cal Lewiston – trumpet
