= Bobbin Records =

- Founded: 1958
- Founder: Little Milton and Bob Lyons
- Defunct: 1963
- Status: Defunct
- Distributor: Chess Records
- Genre: R&B, blues, rock and roll
- Location: St. Louis, Missouri, U.S.

Bobbin Records was an American, St. Louis–based independent record label, founded by blues musician Little Milton and KATZ-AM disc jockey Bob Lyons in 1958. The label was instrumental in exposing Milton and other local artist to wider audiences. As the head of A&R, Milton recruited Albert King, Oliver Sain, and Fontella Bass to record for Bobbin. Bobbin was eventually distributed by the Chess Records.

The Bobbin catalog consists of 44 records between 1958 and 1963. The first release on the label was Milton's "I'm A Lonely Man" in 1958 which sold 60,000 copies. Altogether Milton released seven singles on the label, including two that were released after Leonard Chess bout out Lyons and signed Milton and other artists on Bobbin to his Checker Records label.

In October 1961, Bobbin released Albert King's "Don't Throw Your Love on Me So Strong" which featured musician Ike Turner on piano. The single did well enough locally that King Records leased the recording from Bobbin and released it as a single the next month. It became King's first hit, peaking No.14 on the Billboard R&B chart.

In 1996, Ace Records released the compilation CD St. Louis Blues Revue: The Classic Bobbin Sessions.

== Discography highlights ==
Catalog No.	Release date	Single (A-side, B-side)	Artist	Notes
101	Nov 1958	A: "That Will Never Do" B: "I'm A Lonely Man"	Little Milton	
102	Jan 1959	A: "Limited Love" B: "Unlimited Love"	Roosevelt Marks Orchestra With Clayton Love	
103	Feb 1959	A: "Long Distance Operator" B: "I Found Me A New Love"	Little Milton	
105	Mar 1959	A: "Rock And Roll Blues" B: "Gamblin' Man"	Jules Blattner And His Teen Tones	Billboard review (Mar 30, 1959)
106	May 1959	A: "Midnight Jump" B: "Bring Your Clothes Back Home, Baby"	Walter J. Westbrook and his Phantom Five	
108	May 1959	A: "Bye Bye, Baby" B: "Mistreated"	Roosevelt Marks Orchestra With Clayton Love	
112	Sep 1959	A: "Strange Dreams" B: "I'm Tryin'"	Little Milton	
114	Oct 1959	A: "Ooh-Ee Baby" B: "Why Are You So Mean To Me?"	Albert King	Cash Box review (Nov 7, 1959)
117	Nov 1959	A: "Hold Me Tight" B: "Same Old Blues"	Little Milton	Cash Box review (Dec 5, 1959)
124	Sep 1960	A: "It's Best To Know Who You're Talking To" B: "I Don't Want No Woman"	Grandpappy Gibson	
126	Sep 1960	A: "Let's Have A Natural Ball!" B: "Blues At Sunrise"	Albert King	
129	Jan 1961	A: "I Walked All Night Long" B: "I've Made Nights By Myself"	Albert King	Cash Box review (Feb 4, 1961)
131	Oct 1961	A: "Don't Throw Your Love On Me So Strong" B: "This Morning"	Albert King	"Don't Throw Your Love On Me So Strong" was leased to King Records (R&B No. 14)
132	Feb 1962	A: "Give Me Your Love" B: "Gotta Find My Baby"	Delores Johnson	written by Ike Turner produced by Ike & Tina Turner
133	Apr 1962	A: "Hucklebuck Twist" B: "Harlem Nocturne"	Oliver Sain	Billboard review (Apr 21, 1962)
134	Apr 1962	A: "I Don't Hurt Anymore" B: "Brand New Love"	Fontella Bass	Billboard review (Apr 21, 1962)
135	Jun 1962	A: "I Get Evil" B: "What Can I Do To Change Your Mind"	Albert King	
139	Oct 1962	A: "Heavy Sugar" B: "Eastside Blues"	Oliver Sain	
140	Sep 1962	A: "Honey Bee" B: "Bad Boy"	Fontella Bass	with Oliver Sain's Orchestra Billboard review (Sep 15, 1962)
