= Albert (Albert King album) =

Studio album by Albert King
- Released: 1976
- Genre: Blues
- Label: Utopia
- Producer: Bert DeCoteaux

Albert King chronology
Truckload of Lovin' (1976)	Albert (1976)	Albert Live (1977)

Albert is an album by the American musician Albert King, released in 1976. He supported it with a North American tour. The album peaked at No. 54 on Billboard's Soul LP's chart.

== Production ==
Albert was produced by Bert DeCoteaux. It made use of disco and funk rhythms, female backing choruses, and horn sections, in part due to King's popularity with younger rock audiences. As with many of his albums, King chose to record with studio musicians rather than his backing band. "My Babe" and "I'm Ready" were written by Willie Dixon.

== Critical reception ==
Professional ratings
Review scores
Source	Rating
All Music Guide to the Blues	2/5 stars
The Encyclopedia of Popular Music	3/5 stars
The Rolling Stone Jazz & Blues Album Guide	2/5 stars

The New York Times called Albert "a cleverly produced, disco-tinged album". The Oakland Tribune noted that the contemporary production touches "don't intrude on King's growling vocals and biting blues guitar." The Lincoln Journal Star preferred Albert to Truckload of Lovin', saying that "King gets back to a more direct blues approach, still maintaining a modern approach." The Ann Arbor News said that "there are occasional brief flashes of his technique, but most of the numbers here are fairly short".

== Track listing ==
Side A

1. "Guitar Man"
2. "I'm Ready"
3. "Ain't Nothing You Can Do"
4. "I Don't Care What My Baby Do"

Side B

1. "Change of Pace"
2. "My Babe"
3. "Running Out of Steam"
4. "Rub My Back"
5. "(Ain't It) A Real Good Sign"
