= Albert King =

American blues musician (1923–1992)

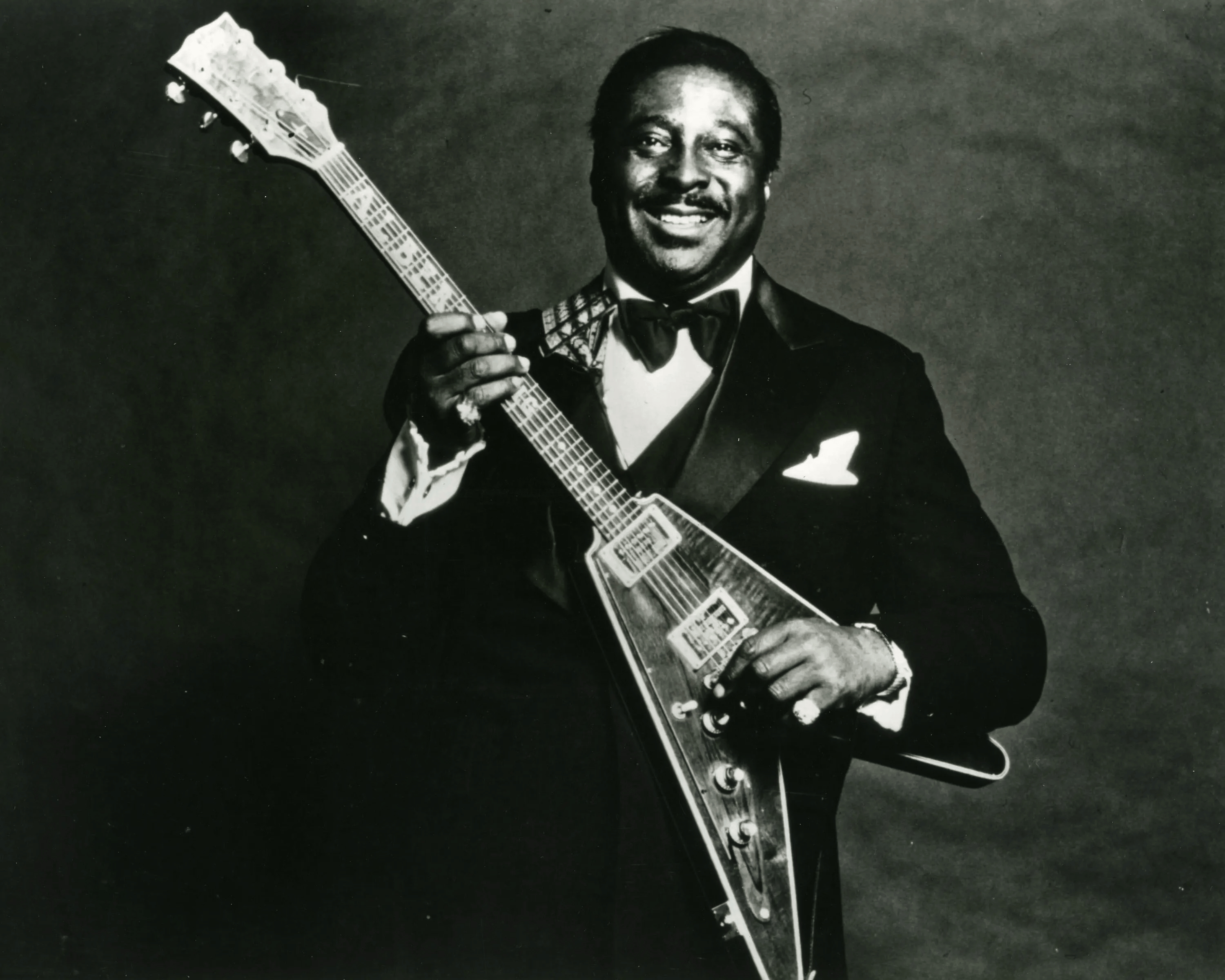
- King in 1976

Background information
- Born: Albert Nelson; April 25, 1923; Indianola, Mississippi, U.S.
- Died: December 21, 1992 (aged 69) Memphis, Tennessee, U.S
- Genres: Blues; rhythm and blues
- Occupations: Musician; songwriter; producer
- Instruments: Guitar; drums; vocals
- Years active: 1949–1992
- Labels: Bobbin; King; Stax; Atlantic

Albert King (né Nelson; April 25, 1923 – December 21, 1992) was an American guitarist and singer, who is often regarded as one of the greatest and most influential blues guitarists ever. He is perhaps best known for his popular and influential album Born Under a Bad Sign (1967) and its title track. B. B. King, Freddie King, and he, all unrelated, were known as the "Three Kings of the Blues". The left-handed Albert King was known for his "deep, dramatic sound that was widely imitated by both blues and rock guitarists".

He was once nicknamed the "Velvet Bulldozer" because of his smooth singing and large size; he stood taller than average, with sources reporting 6 ft 4 in (1.93 m) or 6 ft 7 in (2.01 m), and weighed 250 lb (110 kg), and also because he drove a bulldozer in one of his day jobs early in his career.

King was inducted into the Blues Hall of Fame in 1983. He was posthumously inducted into the Rock and Roll Hall of Fame in 2013. In 2023, he was ranked number 22 on Rolling Stone's 250 Greatest Guitarists of All Time.

== Early life ==
Albert King was born on a cotton plantation in Indianola, Mississippi. During childhood, he sang at a church with a family gospel group, in which his father played the guitar. One of 13 children, he grew up picking cotton on plantations near Forrest City, Arkansas, where the family moved when he was eight years old.

King's identity was a longtime source of confusion. He stated in interviews that he was born in Indianola on April 25, 1923 (or 1924), and was a half-brother of B.B. King (whose hometown was Indianola), but documentation suggests otherwise. He stated that whenever he performed at Club Ebony in Indianola, the event was celebrated as a homecoming, and he cited the fact that B.B.'s father was named Albert King. When he applied for a Social Security card in 1942, though, he gave his birthplace as "Aboden" (most likely Aberdeen, Mississippi) and signed his name as Albert Nelson, listing his father as Will Nelson. Musicians also knew him as Albert Nelson in the 1940s and early 1950s.

He started using the name Albert King in 1953 as an attempt to be associated with B.B. King; he was billed as "B.B. King's brother". He also used the same nickname as B.B. King, "Blues Boy", and he named his guitar "Lucy" (B.B. King's guitar was named "Lucille"). B.B. King later said: "He called his guitar 'Lucy', and for a while he went around saying he was my brother. That bothered me until I got to know him and realized he was right; he wasn't my brother in blood, but he sure was my brother in the blues."

According to King, his father left the family when Albert was five, and when he was eight, he moved with his mother, Mary Blevins, and two sisters to an area near Forrest City, Arkansas. He said his family had also lived in Arcola, Mississippi, for a time. He made his first guitar out of a cigar box, a piece of a bush, and a strand of broom wire. He later bought a real guitar for $1.25. As a left-hander learning guitar on his own, he turned his guitar upside down. He picked cotton, drove a bulldozer, worked in construction, and held other jobs until he was able to support himself as a musician.

== Career ==
King began his professional work as a musician with a group called the Groove Boys in Osceola, Arkansas. During this time, he was exposed to the work of many Delta blues artists, including Elmore James and Robert Nighthawk.

In 1953, he moved north to Gary, Indiana, where he briefly played drums in Jimmy Reed's band and on several of Reed's early recordings. In Gary, he recorded his first single ("Bad Luck Blues" backed with "Be On Your Merry Way"), for Parrot Records. The record sold a few copies, but made no significant impact, and Parrot did not request any follow-up records or sign King to a long-term contract. In 1954, he returned to Osceola and rejoined the Groove Boys for two years.

In 1956, he moved to Brooklyn, Illinois, just across the river from St. Louis, and formed a new band. He became a popular attraction around the St. Louis nightclub scene, alongside Ike Turner's Kings of Rhythm and Chuck Berry. He signed to Little Milton's Bobbin label in 1959, releasing a few singles, but none of them charted. He did catch the attention of King Records, however, which released the single "Don't Throw Your Love on Me So Strong" in November 1961. The recording featured musician Ike Turner on piano and became King's first hit; peaking at number 14 on the Billboard rhythm and blues (R&B) chart. The song was included on his first album The Big Blues in 1962. King left Bobbin in late 1962 and recorded one session for King Records. In 1963, he signed with jazz artist Leo Gooden's Coun-Tree label and cut two records for them, but these failed to chart.

With no apparent career prospects other than touring the club circuit in the South and Midwest, King moved to Memphis, where he signed with the Stax Records label. Produced by Al Jackson Jr., King with Booker T. & the MGs recorded dozens of influential sides, such as "Crosscut Saw" and "As the Years Go Passing By". In 1967, Stax released the album Born Under a Bad Sign, a collection of the singles King recorded at Stax. The title track of that album (written by Booker T. Jones and William Bell) became King's best-known song and has been covered by several artists (including Cream, Paul Rodgers, and Jimi Hendrix). The production of the songs was sparse and clean and maintained a traditional blues sound, while also sounding fresh and thoroughly contemporary. The key to King's success at Stax was giving his songs an upbeat, slick R&B feel that made the songs more appealing and radio-friendly than the slow, traditional blues sound.

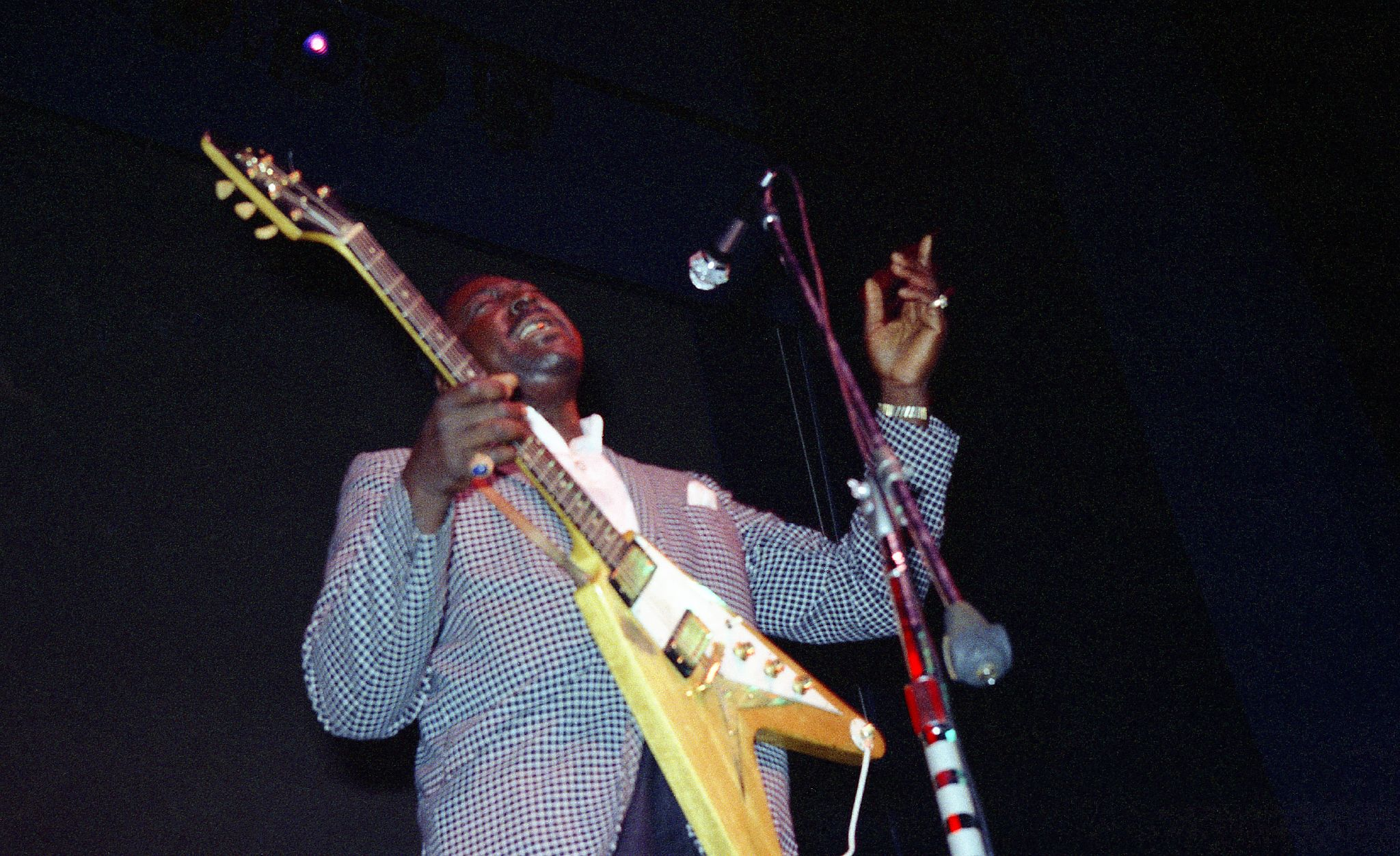
King at Fillmore East, October 1968, with a right handed Gibson Flying V guitar, photo: Grant Gouldon

In 1968, King was performing at Ike Turner's Manhattan Club in East St. Louis when promoter Bill Graham offered him $1,600 to play three nights at the Fillmore Auditorium in San Francisco. One show was reviewed in the 23 March issue of Cash Box. Due to King's drummer having been drafted, Electric Flag drummer Buddy Miles filled in. According to the article, Miles proved to be a valuable asset to King's gig. King released the albums Live Wire/Blues Power, Wednesday Night in San Francisco, and Thursday Night in San Francisco from the concerts.

In 1969, King performed live with the St. Louis Symphony Orchestra. That same year, he released the album Years Gone By. In 1970, he released an Elvis Presley tribute album, Albert King Does the King's Things. It was a collection of Presley's 1950s hits reworked and reimagined in King's musical style, although critics felt the results were mixed.

On June 6, 1970, King joined the Doors on stage at the Pacific Coliseum in Vancouver, BC, Canada. Recordings of this performance were released in 2010 by Rhino Records as Live in Vancouver 1970.

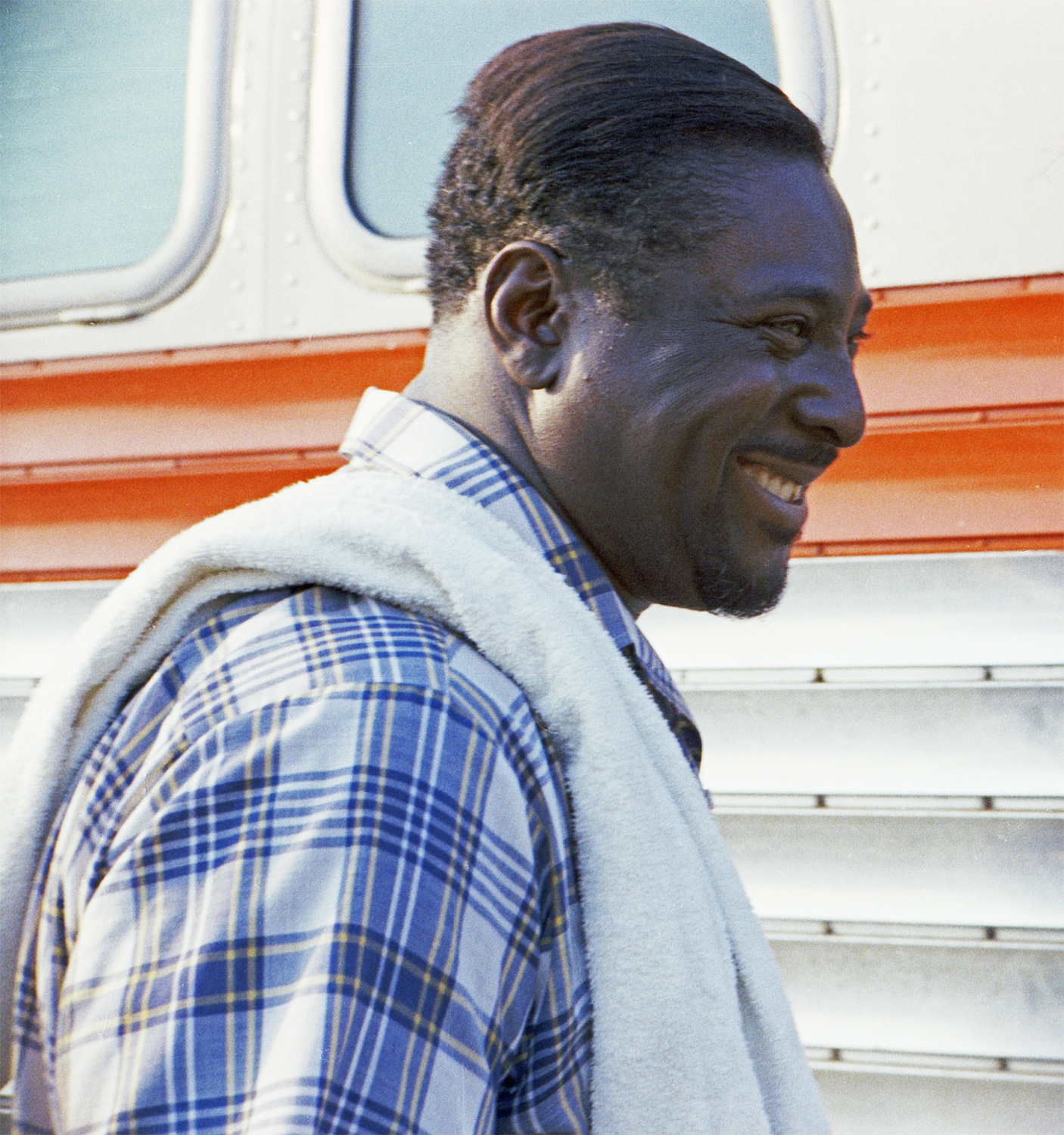
Albert King at the 1970 Ann Arbor Blues Festival

In 1971, he released the album Lovejoy, which notably includes a cover of the Rolling Stones' hit "Honky Tonk Women". To retain his popular appeal, King eagerly embraced the new sound of funk. In 1972, he recorded "I'll Play the Blues for You", which featured accompaniment from the Bar-Kays, the Memphis Horns, and the Movement (Isaac Hayes's backing group). He recorded another album with the Bar-Kays, I Wanna Get Funky (1974). He also made a cameo on an Albert Brooks' comedy album, A Star Is Bought (1975).

In 1975, King's career took a turn downward when Stax Records filed for bankruptcy, after which he moved to the small Utopia label. He then released Albert and Truckload of Lovin' (1976). His third album for Utopia, King Albert (1977), while somewhat more subdued, still lacked any standout material, and King's guitar took a backseat to the background instruments. Clara McDaniel teamed up with King at Ned Love's Club. This led to her touring with King in the Deep South in the 1970s. When McDaniel returned home she managed King's fleet of taxicabs. The last recording King made for Utopia was Live Blues in 1977, from his performance at the Montreux Jazz Festival. The track "As the Years Go Passing By" is noteworthy for his duet with the Irish guitarist Rory Gallagher.

In 1978, King moved to a new label, Tomato Records, for which he recorded the album New Orleans Heat. The label paired him with the R&B producer Allen Toussaint, who had been responsible for scores of hits in that genre in the 1960s and 1970s, but was a novice at working with blues artists. The album was a mix of new songs (including Toussaint's own "Get Out of My Life, Woman") and re-recordings of old material, such as "Born Under a Bad Sign".

King took a four-year break from recording after the disappointing sales of his albums in the late 1970s. During this period, he re-embraced his roots as a blues artist and abandoned any arrangements except straight 12-bar guitar, bass, drums, and piano. In 1983, he released a live album for Fantasy Records, San Francisco '83, which was nominated for a Grammy Award. The same year he recorded a studio television session, more than an hour long, for CHCH Television in Canada, featuring the up-and-coming blues sensation Stevie Ray Vaughan; it was subsequently released as an audio album and later as an audio album plus DVD titled In Session.

In 1984, King released the album, I'm in a Phone Booth, Baby, which was nominated for a Grammy Award. The album included a redo of "Truckload of Lovin'" and two old songs by Elmore James, "Dust My Broom" and "The Sky Is Crying".

King's health problems led him to consider retirement in the 1980s, but he continued regular tours and appearances at blues festivals, using a customized Greyhound tour bus with "I'll Play the Blues for You" painted on the side. His final album, Red House (named after the Jimi Hendrix song) was released in 1991.

At the time of his death, he was planning a tour with B.B. King and Bobby "Blue" Bland. Bland told the Associated Press, "there was never any type of jealousy when we three worked together on a package. One just pushed the others."

== Death ==
King died of a heart attack on December 21, 1992, in his Memphis home. His final concert had been in Los Angeles two days earlier. He was given a funeral procession with the Memphis Horns playing "When the Saints Go Marching In" and was buried in Paradise Gardens Cemetery in Edmondson, Arkansas, near his childhood home. King was not married at the time of his death.

== Artistry ==
In the liner notes of I'll Play the Blues for You, Tom Wheeler of Guitar Player wrote: "Albert King is the Muhammad Ali of blues guitar – a heavyweight with finesse, a bruiser with grace. Float like a butterfly, sting like a bee." King's style is characterized by his use of dynamics. On King's vocals, Wheeler assessed, "Albert's husky voice is a most sensitive blues instrument – sometimes powerful, sometimes gentle, often both. It's an intimate voice, full of experience and humor, and it's just as personal and identifiable as his guitar work." King was a left-handed player, but played right-handed guitars "upside down," which shaped his sound.

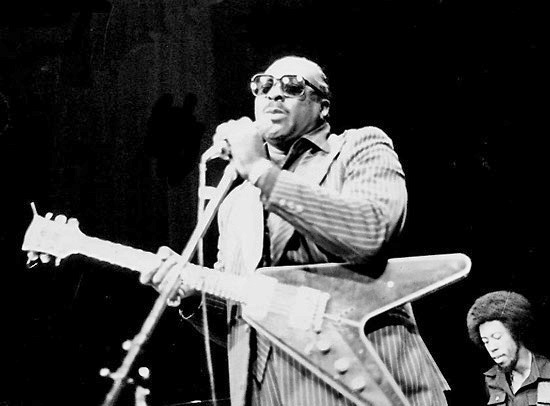
King in Chicago, 1981, left handed Flying V guitar

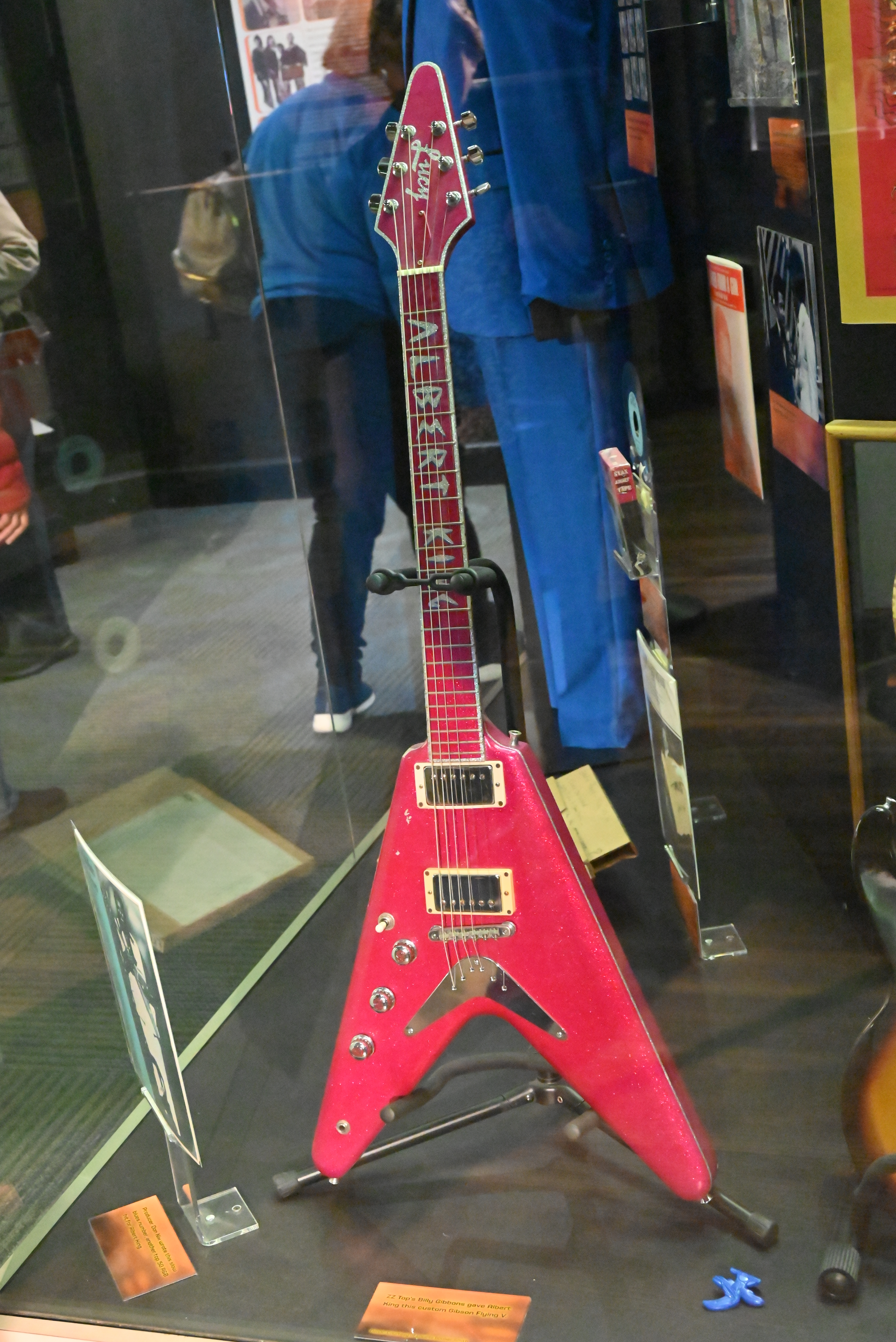
King's "Lucy" custom-made left hand guitar at the Stax Museum of American Soul Music

King's first instrument was a diddley bow. Next, he built himself a cigar box guitar, and eventually he bought a Guild acoustic guitar. The instrument he is usually associated with is a 1958 Gibson Flying V. In 1974, he began using a Flying V built by Dan Erlewine, and after 1980, he also played one built by Bradley Prokopow. After 1987, Albert played a custom Archtop Flying V, built by Tom Holmes upon commission from Billy Gibbons, it was given to King for his 65th birthday. Around 2017, this guitar was sold by Gruhn Guitars to an unknown collector.

King was left-handed, but usually played right-handed guitars flipped upside-down. He used a dropped open tuning, possibly more than one, as reports vary: (C#-G#-B-E-G#-C#) or open E-minor (C-B-E-G-B-E) or open F (C-F-C-F-A-D). Steve Cropper (who played rhythm guitar on many of King's Stax sessions), told Guitar Player that King tuned his guitar to C-B-E-F#-B-E (low to high). The luthier Dan Erlewine said King tuned to C-F-C-F-A-D with light-gauge strings (0.050", 0.038", 0.028", 0.024" wound, 0.012", 0.009"). The lighter-gauge strings, and lower string tension of the dropped tuning, were factors in King's string-bending technique.

For amplification, King used a solid-state Acoustic amplifier, with a speaker cabinet containing two 15-inch speakers and a horn ("which may or may not have been operative"). From the 1980s onwards, King was also known to use a Roland JC-120. Later in his career, he also used an MXR Phase 90.

== Legacy and influence ==
King influenced numerous guitarists, including Jimi Hendrix, Mick Taylor, Derek Trucks, Duane Allman, Eric Clapton, Warren Haynes, Mike Bloomfield, and Joe Walsh (the James Gang guitarist spoke at King's funeral). He also influenced his contemporaries Albert Collins and Otis Rush. He was often cited by Stevie Ray Vaughan as having been his greatest influence. Eric Clapton has said that his work on the 1967 Cream hit "Strange Brew" and throughout the album Disraeli Gears was inspired by King.

Stephen Thomas Erlewine of AllMusic wrote: "Along with B. B. and Freddie King, Albert King is one of the major influences on blues and rock guitar players, and without him, modern guitar music would not sound as it does -- his style has influenced blues players from Otis Rush and Robert Cray to Eric Clapton and Stevie Ray Vaughan. [...] King's massive tone and unique way of squeezing bends out of a guitar string enormously impacted followers, especially in rock & roll, where many players who emulate his style may never have heard of Albert King, let alone heard his music. His style is immediately distinguishable from all other blues guitarists, and he holds the status of one of the most important blues guitarists to ever pick up the electric guitar."

Over the course of his career, King was nominated for two Grammy awards. In 1983, he was nominated for Best Traditional Blues album for San Francisco '83 and the next year he was also nominated for I'm In A Phone Booth, Baby.

In 1983, King was inducted into the Blues Hall of Fame. He received a star on the St. Louis Walk of Fame in 1993. In 2011, King was honored with a marker on the Mississippi Blues Trail in his hometown Indianola. He was inducted into the Memphis Music Hall of Fame in 2013.

King was inducted into the Rock and Roll Hall of Fame in 2013. At the induction ceremony, Gary Clark Jr. performed King's "Oh, Pretty Woman" and was then joined by John Mayer and Booker T. Jones to perform King's "Born Under a Bad Sign".

== Discography ==
=== Studio albums ===
- The Big Blues, also known as Travelin' to California (1963)
- Born Under a Bad Sign (1967)
- Years Gone By (1969)
- Blues for Elvis – King Does the King's Things (1970)
- Lovejoy (1971)
- I'll Play the Blues for You (1972)
- I Wanna Get Funky (1974)
- Albert (1976)
- Truckload of Lovin' (1976)
- King Albert (1977)
- The Pinch, also known as The Blues Don't Change (1977)
- New Orleans Heat (1978)
- San Francisco '83, also known as Crosscut Saw: Albert King in San Francisco (1983)
- I'm in a Phone Booth, Baby (1984)
- The Lost Session (1971, released 1986)
- Red House (1991)

== Videography ==
- Maintenance Shop Blues (VHS), PBS (1981)
- Godfather of the Blues: His Last European Tour 1992 (DVD), P-Vine Records (2001)
- Live in Sweden, Image Entertainment (2004)
- In Session... Albert King with Stevie Ray Vaughan, Stax/Concord Music Group (2010)

== Sources ==
- Bowman, Rob (1997). Soulsville, U.S.A.: The Story of Stax Records. Schirmer Books. ISBN 0-8256-7227-9.
- Gordon, Robert (2001). It Came from Memphis. New York: Atria. ISBN 978-0743410458
- Guralnick, Peter. (1986). Sweet Soul Music: Rhythm and Blues and the Southern Dream of Freedom. New York: HarperCollins. (Back Bay Books, 1999 edition: ISBN 978-0316332736)
