= The Emotions discography =

This discography documents albums and singles released by American R&B/soul group The Emotions.

== Albums ==
=== Studio albums ===
Year	Title	Peak chart positions						Certifications	Record label
Year	Title	US	US R&B	AUS	CAN	B&S UK R&B	B&S Hiplist	Certifications	Record label
1969	So I Can Love You	—	43	—	—	—	—		Volt
1971	Untouched	—	—	—	—	—	—		Volt
1976	Flowers	45	5	—	—	—	—	RIAA: Gold	Columbia
1977	Rejoice	7	1	64	29	—	—	RIAA: Platinum	Columbia
1978	Sunbeam	40	12	—	66	—	—	RIAA: Gold	Columbia
1979	Come into Our World	96	35	—	—	36	—		ARC/Columbia
1981	New Affair	168	46	—	—	—	—		ARC/Columbia
1984	Sincerely	—	33	—	—	—	3		Red Label
1985	If I Only Knew	—	54	—	—	—	11		Motown
"—" denotes a recording that did not chart or was not released in that territory.

=== Compilation albums ===
Year	Title	Peak chart positions		Record label
Year	Title	US	US R&B	Record label
1977	Sunshine	88	39	Stax
1979	Chronicle: Greatest Hits	—	—	Stax
1996	Best of My Love: The Best of the Emotions	—	77	Legacy
1999	Love Songs	—	—	Legacy
2004	Songs of Innocence and Experience...and Then Some!	—	—	Stax
2016	Blessed: The Emotions Anthology 1969-1985	—	—	Big Break

== Singles ==
Year	Title	Peak chart positions									Certifications	Album
Year	Title	US	US R&B	US Dan	US AC	AUS	CAN	NLD	NZ	UK	Certifications	Album
1964	"Good Old Days"	—	—	—	—	—	—	—	—	—		—N/a
1967	"I Can't Stand No More Heartaches"	—	—	—	—	—	—	—	—	—		—N/a
1968	"Somebody New"	—	—	—	—	—	—	—	—	—		—N/a
1968	"I Can't Control These Emotions"	—	—	—	—	—	—	—	—	—		—N/a
1968	"I Love You But I'll Leave You"	—	—	—	—	—	—	—	—	—		—N/a
1969	"So I Can Love You"	39	3	—	—	—	40	—	—	—		So I Can Love You
1969	"The Best Part of a Love Affair"	101	27	—	—	—	—	—	—	—		So I Can Love You
1969	"Stealing Love"	—	40	—	—	—	—	—	—	—		—N/a
1969	"When Tomorrow Comes"	—	40	—	—	—	—	—	—	—		—N/a
1970	"Heart Association"	—	29	—	—	—	—	—	—	—		—N/a
1970	"Black Christmas"	—	—	—	—	—	—	—	—	—		—N/a
1971	"You Make Me Want to Love You"	—	47	—	—	—	—	—	—	—		—N/a
1971	"If You Think It (You May As Well Do It)"	—	—	—	—	—	—	—	—	—		Untouched
1971	"Show Me How"	52	13	—	—	—	—	—	—	—		Untouched
1972	"My Honey and Me"	113	18	—	—	—	—	—	—	—		—N/a
1972	"I Could Never Be Happy"	93	23	—	—	—	—	—	—	—		—N/a
1972	"From Toys to Boys"	112	37	—	—	—	—	—	—	—		—N/a
1973	"Runnin' Back (And Forth)"	—	91	—	—	—	—	—	—	—		—N/a
1973	"Peace Be Still"	—	—	—	—	—	—	—	—	—		—N/a
1973	"What Do the Lonely Do at Christmas"	—	—	—	—	—	—	—	—	—		—N/a
1974	"Put a Little Love Away"	73	53	—	—	—	79	—	—	—		—N/a
1974	"Baby, I'm Through"	—	82	—	—	—	—	—	—	—		—N/a
1974	"There Are More Questions Than Answers"	—	—	—	—	—	—	—	—	—		—N/a
1976	"Flowers"	87	16	—	—	—	—	—	2	59 (Note: Chart position is from the official UK "Breakers List".)	RMNZ: Gold	Flowers
1976	"I Don't Wanna Lose Your Love"	51	13	4	—	—	67	—	—	40		Flowers
1977	"Best of My Love"	1	1	11	—	17	5	21	9	4	RIAA: Platinum; BPI: Gold; RMNZ: Platinum	Rejoice
1977	"Don't Ask My Neighbors"	44	7	—	—	—	88	—	—	—		Rejoice
1977	"Shouting Out Love"	—	31	—	—	—	—	—	—	—		Sunshine
1978	"Baby, I'm Through" (re-release)	—	59	—	—	—	—	—	—	—		Sunshine
1978	"Smile"	102	6	—	—	—	—	—	—	—		Sunbeam
1978	"Whole Lot of Shakin'"	—	44	—	—	—	—	—	—	—		Sunbeam
1979	"Walking the Line"	—	58	—	—	—	—	—	—	—		Sunbeam
1979	"Boogie Wonderland" (with Earth, Wind & Fire)	6	2	14	—	6	11	4	7	4	RIAA: Gold; BPI: Platinum; RMNZ: Platinum	I Am
1979	"What's the Name of Your Love?"	—	30	—	—	—	—	—	—	—		Come into Our World
1979	"I Should Be Dancing"	—	—	—	—	—	—	41	—	—		Come into Our World
1980	"Where Is Your Love?"	—	75	—	—	—	—	—	—	—		Come into Our World
1980	"Come into My World"	—	—	95	—	—	—	—	—	—		Come into Our World
1981	"Turn It Out"	—	48	50	—	—	—	—	—	—		New Affair
1981	"Now That I Know"	—	68	—	—	—	—	—	—	—		New Affair
1984	"You're the One"	—	34	—	—	—	—	—	—	—		Sincerely
1984	"You're the Best"	—	52	33	—	—	—	—	—	—		Sincerely
1984	"Are You Through with My Heart?"	—	87	—	—	—	—	—	—	—		Sincerely
1985	"Miss Your Love"	—	—	—	—	—	—	—	—	—		If I Only Knew
1985	"If I Only Knew Then (What I Know Now)"	—	—	—	—	—	—	—	—	—		If I Only Knew
2003	"All in the Way" (with Earth, Wind & Fire)	—	77	—	25	—	—	—	—	—		The Promise
"—" denotes a recording that did not chart or was not released in that territory.
