= List of songs written by Allee Willis =

This is a partial list of the songs that have been written by American songwriter Allee Willis.

== Songs ==
- "All American Girls" – Sister Sledge (1981)
- "Be There" – The Pointer Sisters (1987)
- "Boogie Wonderland" – Earth, Wind & Fire & The Emotions (1979)
- "Can't Let Go" – Earth, Wind & Fire (1979)
- "Cryin' My Heart Out for You" – Diana Ross (1981)
- "Come Running to Me" – Herbie Hancock (1978)
- "Come What May" – Patti LaBelle (1979)
- "Could It Be Right" – Earth, Wind & Fire (1983)
- "Crazy For Ya" – Narada Michael Walden (1979)
- "Don't You Let Me Lose It" – Sister Sledge (1981)
- "Evil Roy" – Earth, Wind & Fire (1988)
- "God Knows" – Deniece Williams (1979)
- "Got You on My Mind" – Bonnie Raitt (1974)
- "He's Just a Runaway" – Sister Sledge (1981)
- "Hold On, Be Strong" – Randy Crawford (1992)
- "How You Once Loved Me" – Dionne Warwick (1980)
- "I Am Love" – Jennifer Holliday (1983)
- "I Do Love You" – Angela Bofill (1981)
- "I See Home" – Patti LaBelle (1978)
- "I Shoulda Loved Ya" – Narada Michael Walden (1979)
- "(If I Could Only) Change Your Mind" – Al Jarreau (1980)
- "In the Stone" – Earth, Wind & Fire (1979)
- "It's A Lie" – Sharon Redd (1980)
- "I'll Be There for You" – The Rembrandts (1995)
- "Lead Me On" – Maxine Nightingale (1979)
- "Let Your Feelings Show" – Earth, Wind & Fire (1979)
- "Little Girls" – Patti LaBelle (1978)
- "Love Is Gonna Get Ya" – Sharon Redd (1980)
- "Love Me Again" – Patti Austin (1980)
- "Micro-Kid" - Level 42 (1983)
- "Money Tight" – Earth, Wind & Fire (1987)
- "Neutron Dance" – The Pointer Sisters (1984)
- "Never In My Life" – Cherrelle (1991)
- "Next Time You'll Know" – Sister Sledge (1981)
- "Now" – L.T.D. (1981)
- "One More Try" – Billy Preston & Syreeta (1981)
- "Ooh, You Caught My Heart" – Sister Sledge (1981)
- "Perfect Love" – Atlantic Starr (1982)
- "September" – Earth, Wind & Fire (1978)
- "Set Me Free" – The Pointer Sisters (1986)
- "Shelter" – Leon Ware (1982)
- "Star" – Earth, Wind & Fire (1979)
- "Something About You" – Angela Bofill (1981)
- "Stir It Up" – Patti LaBelle (1985)
- "Sunday Morning" – Earth, Wind & Fire (1993)
- "The Movie" – The Emotions (1979)
- "There'll Never Be Another Moment" – The Emotions (1981)
- "There's a Star for Everyone" – Aretha Franklin (1981)
- "Time Will Tell" – Patti LaBelle (1993)
- "Touch and Go" – Stanley Clarke & George Duke (1981)
- "Could It Be Right" – Earth, Wind & Fire (1983)
- "Trust Me" – Herbie Hancock (1979)
- "Try It Out" – Leon Ware (1979)
- "Wait" – Earth, Wind & Fire (1979)
- "What Have I Done to Deserve This?" – Pet Shop Boys & Dusty Springfield (1987)
- "What's the Name of Your Love?" – The Emotions (1979)
- "When Love Begins Friendship Ends" – Bobby Womack (1978)
- "Who Let In the Rain" – Cyndi Lauper (1993)
- "We're Living in Our Own Time" – Earth, Wind & Fire (1983)
- "Why Did You Turn Me On" – Phyllis Hyman (1983)
- "You and I" – Earth, Wind & Fire (1979)
- "You And Me" – Patti LaBelle (1979)
- "You Bet Your Love" – Herbie Hancock (1979)
- "You're the Best" – Joe Esposito (1984)
