= Let's Groove: The Best Of =

Compilation album by Earth, Wind & Fire
- Released: 1996
- Genre: R&B
- Label: Columbia
- Producer: Maurice White, Charles Stepney

Earth, Wind & Fire chronology
Boogie Wonderland: The Very Best of Earth, Wind & Fire (1996)	Let's Groove: The Best Of (1996)	Greatest Hits (1998)

Let's Groove: The Best Of is a compilation album by the band Earth, Wind & Fire released in 1996 on Columbia Records. The album has been certified Gold in the UK by the BPI.

== Tracklisting ==
No.	Title	Length
1.	"Let's Groove"	5:00
2.	"Boogie Wonderland"	4:48
3.	"Saturday Nite"	4:02
4.	"In the Stone"	4:48
5.	"I've Had Enough"	4:28
6.	"Can't Let Go"	3:29
7.	"Fall In Love with Me"	5:50
8.	"Star"	4:26
9.	"September"	3:36
10.	"Jupiter"	3:11
11.	"Got to Get You into My Life"	4:08
12.	"Fantasy"	4:40
13.	"Evil"	5:00
14.	"That's the Way of the World"	5:45
15.	"You Can't Hide Love"	4:10
16.	"Reasons"	5:00
17.	"After the Love Has Gone"	4:30
