= Show Me How =

Show Me How may refer to:

- Show Me How (album), a 2004 album by Lorrie Morgan, or the title song
- "Show Me How" (The Emotions song), 1971
- "Show Me How" (Foo Fighters song), 2023
- "Show Me How", a song by Men I Trust
