= You're the Best (disambiguation) =

"You're the Best" is a 1984 song by Joe Esposito.

It may also refer to:

- You're the Best (album) by Keni Burke, 1981
- "You're the Best" (The Emotions song), 1984
- "You're the Best", a 2016 song by Mamamoo from Melting
- You Are the Best!, a South Korean TV series
- You Are the Best, a 2025 Chinese film
