= If I Only Knew =

If I Only Knew may refer to:

- "If I Only Knew" (song) a song by Rise Robots Rise, covered by Tom Jones
- If I Only Knew (album), a 1985 album by The Emotions
