= Untouched =

Untouched may refer to:

- Untouched (album), by the Emotions, 1971
- "Untouched" (song), by the Veronicas, 2007
- Untouched (film), a 1954 Mexican film
- Untouched, a pirated movie release type
