= Prudence Fenton =

American media producer

- Born: United States
- Occupation: Producer
- Known for: Pee-wee's Playhouse; Liquid Television
- Partner: Allee Willis

Prudence Fenton is an American film, television and music video producer. She won a Grammy for producing and co-creating the music video for Peter Gabriel's 1992 single "Steam".

== Career ==
She began her career creating and animating MTV I.D.s, Pee-wee's Playhouse, and the animated Peter Gabriel rock videos. At the turn of the century she was executive producer for ABC's One Saturday Morning, made up of branded cartoons and live-action bumpers. Fenton also co-created and directed and produced Fat Girl, an animated series of shorts that ran on the Oxygen Media network's X-Chromosome show. She co-created and directed a series for urbanentertainment.com called Driving While Black.

She has won two Emmy Awards for Pee-wee's Playhouse, where she was animation and special effects producer. In 1994, she won a Grammy for producing and co-creating Peter Gabriel's video, "Steam". She also executive produced Peter Gabriel's "Big Time" video, which won Billboard and MTV awards as well. She was executive Producer and Story Editor for the award winning MTV series Liquid Television and with this series brought Beavis and Butt-head to MTV. In 1988, Fenton produced a 20-minute film for Amnesty International illustrating the Universal Declaration of Human Rights using 35 animators from around the world. This film was part of the Sting, Bruce Springsteen, Peter Gabriel Amnesty concert tour that went to many cities and seven continents. The film also won the Lillian Gish award and Los Angeles animation festival award. Fenton has also won many Clio awards for MTV program ids. She is the creator and executive producer of the web series Sub:3 on Shut Up! Cartoons.

In 2024, she appeared in the documentary The World According to Allee Willis about her partner for over 25 years, songwriter Allee Willis.

== Producer ==
- Sub:3 (2012) web series (creator, executive producer, writer)
- Red Eye (2002) TV series (executive producer)
- DIRT (Defiant Inthefaceof Rowdy Tyrants) Squirrel (2005) MTV (supervising producer)
- Drew Carey's Green Screen Show (2004) (animation producer)
- Treasure Planet 2 (2002) (development producer)
- Kronk's New Groove (also known as The Emperor's New Groove 2) (2002) (development producer)
- Fat Girl (1999) (Oh! Network) (co-creator, producer and director)
- One Saturday Morning (1997) (TV series) (executive producer, supervising producer) (... aka Disney's One Saturday Morning)
- "Steam" (music video) (1992) Peter Gabriel (producer, co-director)
- Liquid Television (1991–1993) (TV series) (executive producer, story editor)
- Christmas Special (1988) (TV) (animation producer) ... aka Christmas at Pee Wee's Playhouse ... aka Pee-Wee Herman's Christmas Special ... aka Pee-wee's Playhouse Christmas Special
- Pee-wee's Playhouse (1986–1990) (animation and effects producer)
- The Universal Declaration of Human Rights (Amnesty International) (1988) (producer)
- "Big Time" (music video) (1986) Peter Gabriel (executive producer)

== Director ==
- Driving While Black (2001) (co-creator and director)
- X-Chromosome's Fat Girl (1999) (co-creator, producer and segment director)
- One Saturday Morning (1997) (TV series) … aka Disney's One Saturday Morning (co-executive producer)
- Moonwalker (1986) (feature film) Michael Jackson (Opening segment director)

== Actress ==
- X-Chromosome's Animating Women (herself)
- One Saturday Morning (1997) TV series (Derby the Mouse)

== Special effects ==
- Pee-wee's Playhouse (1986–1990) TV series (special effects director, animation director)
- A Special Evening of Pee-wee's Playhouse (animation director)
- Pee-wee's Playhouse Christmas Special (animation director)
- Disney's One Saturday Morning (titles)
- Unsolved Mysteries (1987–1989) (effects director)

== Artist ==
- In 2006, Fenton's collection of paintings titled "The Space Between" was exhibited at the Los Angeles Ghetto Gloss art gallery

== Awards ==
- 1994 Grammy Award Best short music video Peter Gabriel Video "Steam"
- 1993 MTV Music Video Award Best special effects Peter Gabriel Video "Steam"
- 1991 Emmy Award Outstanding achievement in graphics and title design Pee-wee's Playhouse
- 1989 Lillian Gish Award Women in Film Festival Universal Declaration of Human Rights (Film)
- 1987 Emmy Award Outstanding achievement in graphics and title design Pee-wee's Playhouse
- Los Angeles International Animation Festival Best Film in 30-minute category, Universal Declaration of Human Rights
- 1983 Clio Award For production of MTV program ID "Subway"
- 1982 Clio Award For production of MTV program ID "MTV Sandwich"
- 1982 ASIFA Award MTV ID Concept "Elephant"

== See also ==
- Allee Willis
- Pee-wee's Playhouse
