= Marvell Thomas =

- Born: Ronald Marvell Thomas; August 22, 1941; Memphis, Tennessee, U.S.
- Died: January 23, 2017 (aged 75) Memphis, Tennessee, U.S.
- Genres: Memphis soul
- Occupation: Musician
- Instrument: Keyboards
- Labels: Stax

Ronald Marvell Thomas (August 22, 1941 – January 23, 2017) was an American keyboardist, record producer and arranger known for his work in Memphis Soul.

== Biography ==
Born in Memphis, Tennessee, Thomas's studio career started at the age of 17. He was the first piano player to punch the clock at Stax Records. He played on the label's earliest national hits, including "Burnt Biscuits" (by the short-lived group The Triumphs, later covered by Booker T. & the MGs), childhood friend William Bell's "You Don't Miss Your Water", and the company's first hit "Cause I Love You" (featuring a sixteen-year-old Booker T. Jones on saxophone), a duet by Rufus and Carla Thomas. He also played on some of Wilson Pickett sessions at Stax and at Muscle Shoals. More sessions at Muscle Shoals included Clarence Carter, Eddie Hinton, and Denise LaSalle.

Thomas worked frequently as keyboardist and arranger, appearing on albums by Johnnie Taylor, The Staple Singers, Little Milton, The Emotions, Albert King, Mavis Staples, Yvonne Elliman, and Etta James.

Thomas co-produced and played keyboards on the multi-platinum Isaac Hayes album, Hot Buttered Soul. His touring credits include concerts with The Temptations, and acting as music director for Peabo Bryson, Isaac Hayes, his father Rufus Thomas, and his sister Carla Thomas.

== Personal life ==
His father, Rufus Thomas, was dubbed "Memphis's other King". His sister Carla Thomas was known as the "Memphis Queen" after her breakthrough hit "Gee Whiz (Look at His Eyes)". His youngest sibling, Vaneese Thomas, is also an accomplished recording artist.

Thomas died after a brief illness in Memphis, Tennessee, at the age of 75.
