= The World According to Allee Willis =

- Directed by: Alexis Spraic
- Starring: Lily Tomlin; Allee Willis; Paul Reubens; Prudence Fenton; Julie Brown; Cyndi Lauper; Patti LaBelle; Bruce Vilanch; Paul Feig; Pamela Adlon; Andrae Alexander; Stephen Bray; Mark Cuban; Mark Mothersbaugh; Lesley Ann Warren
- Distributed by: Magnolia Pictures
- Release date: 2024
- Country: United States
- Language: English

The World According to Allee Willis is a 2024 American biographical documentary about the life of songwriter Allee Willis directed by Alexis Manya Spraic.

== Critical reception ==
- Los Angeles Times, "The zesty, illuminating “The World According to Allee Willis” feels like what the showbiz biodoc was meant for, to give voice to someone who was so much more than a ubiquitous album-sleeve credit."
- The New York Times, "“The World According to Allee Willis” shines a light on a musical artist whose creative spirit wasn't limited to one genre or even to music."
- The Hollywood Reporter, "Director Alexis Manya Spraic crafts a documentary that strives to be just as fascinating as its subject."
- Variety, "Alexis Manya Spraic’s documentary feels like a colorful sampler drawn from near-inexhaustible source materials."
