= I Am (Earth, Wind & Fire album) =

Studio album by Earth, Wind & Fire
- Released: June 1979
- Recorded: September 1978-March 1979
- Studios: Hollywood Sound and Sunset Sound Recorders (Hollywood, California); Davlen Sound (North Hollywood, California)
- Genres: R&B; soul; funk; disco
- Length: 37:36
- Labels: ARC; Columbia
- Producers: Maurice White; Al McKay (co. producer on "Boogie Wonderland")

Earth, Wind & Fire chronology
The Best of Earth, Wind & Fire, Vol. 1 (1978)	I Am (1979)	Faces (1980)

Singles from I Am
- 1. "Boogie Wonderland" Released: May 6, 1979; 2. "After the Love Has Gone" Released: July 12, 1979; 3. "In the Stone" Released: October 14, 1979; 4. "Star" Released: December 6, 1979; 5. "Can't Let Go" Released: December 30, 1979

I Am is the ninth studio album by the American band Earth, Wind & Fire. It was released in June 1979 by ARC/Columbia Records. The LP rose to number one on the Billboard Top Soul Albums chart and number three on the Billboard 200 chart. I Am has been certified double Platinum in the U.S. by the RIAA, Platinum in the UK by the BPI, and Platinum in Canada by Music Canada.

I Am was produced by Maurice White. The album features guest appearances by the Emotions and Toto's Steve Lukather.

== Singles ==
"After the Love Has Gone" reached number two on both the Billboard Hot 100 and Hot Soul Songs charts. "After the Love Has Gone" also reached number three on both the Billboard Adult Contemporary Songs and UK Pop Singles charts. The ballad was Grammy-nominated in the Record of the Year and Best R&B Vocal Performance by a Duo or Group categories, and won the latter.

Another single, "Boogie Wonderland", featuring The Emotions, reached number two on the Billboard Hot Soul Songs chart and number 6 on the Billboard Hot 100 chart. "Boogie Wonderland" was also Grammy-nominated in the categories of Best Disco Recording and Best R&B Instrumental Performance. It won the Grammy for the latter category.

== Critical reception ==
Professional ratings
Review scores
Source	Rating
AllMusic	3/5 stars
Robert Christgau	B
Music Week	4/4 stars
MusicHound Rock: The Essential Album Guide	4/5 stars
The Rolling Stone Album Guide	3/5 stars
The Virgin Encyclopedia of R&B and Soul	3/5 stars

Eric Sieger of The Baltimore Sun described I Am as "faultlessly produced." Sieger added, "The album features a horn and string section, synthesizers, congas, and kalimbas and the material ranges from straight boogie to soulful ballads. Lyrically, some of the numbers leave something to be desired, but Earth, Wind & Fire is one group where the musicianship is so sharp and vibrant that the words don't seem to matter quite so much." AllMusic's Alex Henderson noted, "I Am isn't a radical departure from its predecessor, All 'n All. Though not in a class with That's the Way of the World, Spirit, or All 'n All, I Am is a rewarding album that has a lot going for it."

Phyl Garland of Stereo Review wrote: "As Earth, Wind & Fire have strengthened their grip on success, the mystical and extraterrestrial emblems adorning their albums have gained proportionately in grandiosity. This latest one, with a title echoing the majesty of Jehovah and an inside cover featuring a portrait of the group costumed and posed as princes out of fable, is no exception. Such bombast may be considered forgivable in this case, however, because of the excellence of the music on the record. As usual, this astral outfit blasts off in a balls-of-fire flurry of rhythm, which is cleverly varied through the album, even within selections, without losing its driving thrust. There is some evidence of capitulation to disco, particularly on Boogie Wonderland, to which the Emotions lend a few spirited soprano embellishments, but the emphasis throughout is on a dazzling interplay between precision ensemble voices-employed like horns-in rapid, robust exchanges with the group's instruments augmented by a large orchestra."

Rose Riggins of Gannett exclaimed that "I Am is explosive and ready to lift you off your feet to boogie wonderland. Earth Wind & Fire's 10th album, it shows the band is still on the move upward. This is a fine LP, both versatile and creative." Dave Marsh of Rolling Stone said that "I Am is obviously meant to portend something, but who knows what? Is this Maurice White's vision of paradise?" John Rockwell of The New York Times stated: "This flashily theatrical, musically imaginative creation of Maurice White can almost always be counted on for interesting records, and the new I Am album is no exception." Rockwell added, "Mr. White's records reaffirm one of the basic truths about the shifting fashions of black music. All these up‐tempo Idioms are inherently related. Disco and funk and soul and rhythm and blues are all fruits of the same tree—the music of rural black people, growing from African roots and shaped by influences from the dominant white culture, evangelical Christianity and the 'urban experience. A band like Earth, Wind and Fire will enjoy its disco hits. But those hits won't sound like a very significant change in direction because a slight emphasis of the bass line entails only the most modest modification of the basic style."

Allen Weiner of The Morning Call stated, "EW&F's latest effort goes beyond every level of achievement Maurice White's legions have yet attempted. "I Am" is a splendid example of EW&F's ability to create soul with individuality and without cliches, music that is both artistic and commercial." Robert Christgau of the The Village Voice wrote, "Sexy, dancey pop music of undeniable craft, and it doesn't let up. But as we all know, they could be doing a lot better." Connie Johnson of the Los Angeles Times proclaimed that "I Am is freshly innovative for EW&F in that it emphasizes the one-on-one—as opposed to the cosmic—experience, and freely utilizes the skill of other writers to propel that message. The album should also enforce EW&F's image as trend-setters for other rhythm & blues groups seeking to escape the traditional, doo-wop mold." Robot A. Hull of Creem described the LP as "a rhythmic utopia". James Johnson of the Evening Standard stated: "On I Am ... the band's flashy staccato rhythms, their smooth melodies and precise production adds up to another majestic album". Ace Adams of the New York Daily News called the album "a collection of numbers from disco to rhythm and blues and into a little jazz." Adams added that "the group's impressive vocals make this album a must".

NME placed I Am at number sixteen on their albums of the year list for 1979. Melody Maker also placed the album at number eight on their albums of the year list for 1979. Bandleader Maurice White was also Grammy-nominated in the category of Producer of the Year Non-Classical.

=== Accolades ===
Publication	Country	Accolade	Year	Rank
Melody Maker	U.K	Albums of the Year	1979	8
NME	U.K	Albums of the Year	1979	16
The Guardian	U.K	Alternative Top 100 Albums	1999	14
Mojo 1000, the Ultimate CD Buyers Guide	U.K	100 Soul Albums Everyone Should Own	2001	*
Gary Mulholland	U.K	261 Greatest Albums Since Punk and Disco	2007	*

== Track listing ==
=== Original release ===
Side one
No.	Title	Writer(s)	Length
1.	"In the Stone"	Maurice White; Allee Willis; David Foster	4:48
2.	"Can't Let Go"	Billy Meyers; White; Willis	3:28
3.	"After the Love Has Gone"	Foster; Jay Graydon; Bill Champlin	4:26
4.	"Let Your Feelings Show"	White; Willis; Foster	5:24

Side two
No.	Title	Writer(s)	Length
5.	"Boogie Wonderland" (featuring The Emotions)	Jon Lind; Willis	4:48
6.	"Star"	Del Barrio; White; Willis	4:23
7.	"Wait"	White; Willis; Foster	3:39
8.	"Rock That!"	White; Foster	3:07
9.	"You and I"	White; Willis; Foster	3:34
Total length:			37:37

=== 2004 reissue bonus tracks ===
2004 bonus tracks
No.	Title	Writer(s)	Length
10.	"Diana"	M. White; Foster	4:08
11.	"Dirty (Interlude)" (featuring Junior Wells)	M. White	0:52
12.	"Dirty (Junior's Juke)" (featuring Junior Wells)	M. White; Alexander Dutkewych	3:44
Total length:			8:44

== Personnel ==
Earth, Wind & Fire

- Philip Bailey – lead vocals, backing vocals, congas, percussion
- Maurice White – lead vocals, backing vocals, drums, kalimba
- Larry Dunn – acoustic piano, Oberheim synthesizer, Moog synthesizer
- Johnny Graham – guitars
- Al McKay – guitars
- Verdine White – bass
- Fred White – drums
- Ralph Johnson – percussion
- Andrew Woolfolk – tenor saxophone

Earth, Wind & Fire horn section

- Don Myrick – alto saxophone, baritone saxophone, tenor saxophone, sax solo (3)
- Louis Satterfield – trombone
- Rahmlee Michael Davis – trumpet, trumpet solo (6)

Additional musicians

- David Foster – keyboards
- Eddie del Barrio – keyboards
- Bill Meyers – keyboards
- Steve Porcaro – synthesizer programming
- Marlo Henderson – guitars
- Steve Lukather – guitars
- Paulinho da Costa – percussion
- Junior Wells – harmonica (11), lead vocals (11)
- Sir Alexander Dutkewych – harp (12)
- The Emotions – additional vocals (5)

Orchestra

- Jerry Hey – horn arrangements (1, 3, 8, 10–12)
- David Foster – string arrangements (1, 3, 8, 10)
- Thomas "Tom Tom 84" Washington – horn arrangements (2, 4, 6, 9), string arrangements (2, 4, 6, 7, 9)
- Benjamin Wright – horn arrangements (5), string arrangements (5)

Horn section

- Fred Jackson Jr. – saxophones
- Jerome Richardson – saxophones
- Herman Riley – saxophones
- George Bohanon – trombone
- Garnett Brown – trombone
- Benny Powell – trombone
- Bill Reichenbach Jr. – trombone
- Maurice Spears – trombone
- Oscar Brashear – trumpet
- Bobby Bryant – trumpet
- Michael Harris – trumpet
- Steve Madaio – trumpet
- Jerry Hey – trumpet
- Barbara Korn – French horn
- Sidney Muldrow – French horn
- Richard Perissi – French horn
- Marilyn Robinson – French horn

String section

- Delores Bing – cello
- Larry Corbett – cello
- Jan Kelley – cello
- Jacqueline Lustgarten – cello
- Miguel Martinez – cello
- Daniel Smith – cello
- Kevan Torah – cello
- John Walz – cello
- Dorothy Ashby – harp
- Marilyn Baker – viola
- Rollice Dale – viola
- Linda Lipsett – viola
- Virginia Majewski – viola
- James Ross – viola
- Laurie Woods – viola
- Ron Clark – violin
- Marcy Dicterow – violin
- Pavel Farkas – violin
- Henry Ferber – violin
- Pamela Gates – violin
- Harris Goldman – violin
- Joseph Goodman – violin
- Jack Gootkin – violin
- Janice Gower – violin, concertmaster
- William Henderson – violin
- Cynthia Kovaks – violin
- Gina Kronstadt – violin
- Carl LaMagna – violin
- Joseph Livoti – violin
- Jerome Reisler – violin
- Henry Roth – violin
- Sheldon Sanov – violin
- Anton Sen – violin
- Bryana Sherman – violin
- Leeana Sherman – violin
- Haim Shtrum – violin
- Ilkka Talvi – violin
- Judith Talvi – violin
- Rosmen Torfeh – violin
- Jerome Webster – violin

Percussion

- Richard Lepore – timpani

Production

- Maurice White – producer
- Al McKay – producer (5)
- George Massenburg – engineer, remixing
- Tom Perry – engineer
- Ross Pallone – assistant engineer
- Craig Widby – assistant engineer
- Mike Reese – CD mastering at The Mastering Lab (Hollywood, California)
- Roger Carpenter – album design
- Shusei Nagaoka – illustration

2004 reissue

- Steve Berkowitz – Legacy A&R
- Leo Sacks – producer, liner notes
- Maurice White – producer, liner notes
- Paul Klingberg – additional production (10, 12)
- Mark Wilder – mastering at Sony Music Studios (New York City, New York)
- Joy Monfried – project director
- Adam Farber – A&R coordinator
- Patti Matheny – A&R coordinator
- Darren Salmieri – A&R coordinator
- Howard Fritzson – art direction
- Sara Syms – design
- Urve Kuusik – photography (page 3, inner tray card)
- Sandy Speiser – photography (pages 4, 6–7; from cover of Star single)
- Liz Reilly – photo researcher
- Fong Y. Lee – packaging manager
- Wanda Vaughn – liner notes

== Charts ==
=== Weekly charts ===
Year	Chart	Position
1979	US Billboard 200	3
1979	US Billboard Top Soul Albums	1
1979	Norwegian Albums (VG-lista)	2
1979	Sweden Albums (Sverigetopplistan)	3
1979	UK Pop Albums	5
1979	Japanese Albums (Oricon)	10
1979	Finland (Suomen virallinen albumlista)	9

=== Year-end charts ===
Year	Chart	Position
1979	US Billboard 200	65
1979	US Billboard Top Soul Albums	17
1979	Netherlands (Album Top 100)	26
1979	New Zealand Albums (RMNZ)	40
1979	Japanese Albums (Oricon)	42

=== Singles ===
Year	Single	Chart			
Year	Single	US Hot 100	US R&B	US Dance	UK Pop Singles
1979	"Boogie Wonderland" (featuring The Emotions)	6	2	14	4
1979	"After the Love Has Gone"	2	2	-	4
1979	"In the Stone"	58	23	-	53
1979	"Star"	64	47	-	16
1979	"Can't Let Go"	-	-	-	46

== Certifications ==
Certifications for I Am
Region	Certification	Certified units/sales
Canada (Music Canada)	Platinum	100,000^{^}
Japan	—	149,870
Netherlands (NVPI)	Platinum	100,000^{^}
United Kingdom (BPI)	Platinum	300,000^{^}
United States (RIAA)	2× Platinum	2,000,000^{^}
^{^} Shipments figures based on certification alone.

== See also ==
- List of Billboard number-one R&B albums of 1979
