= Don't Ask My Neighbors =

1977 song by The Emotions

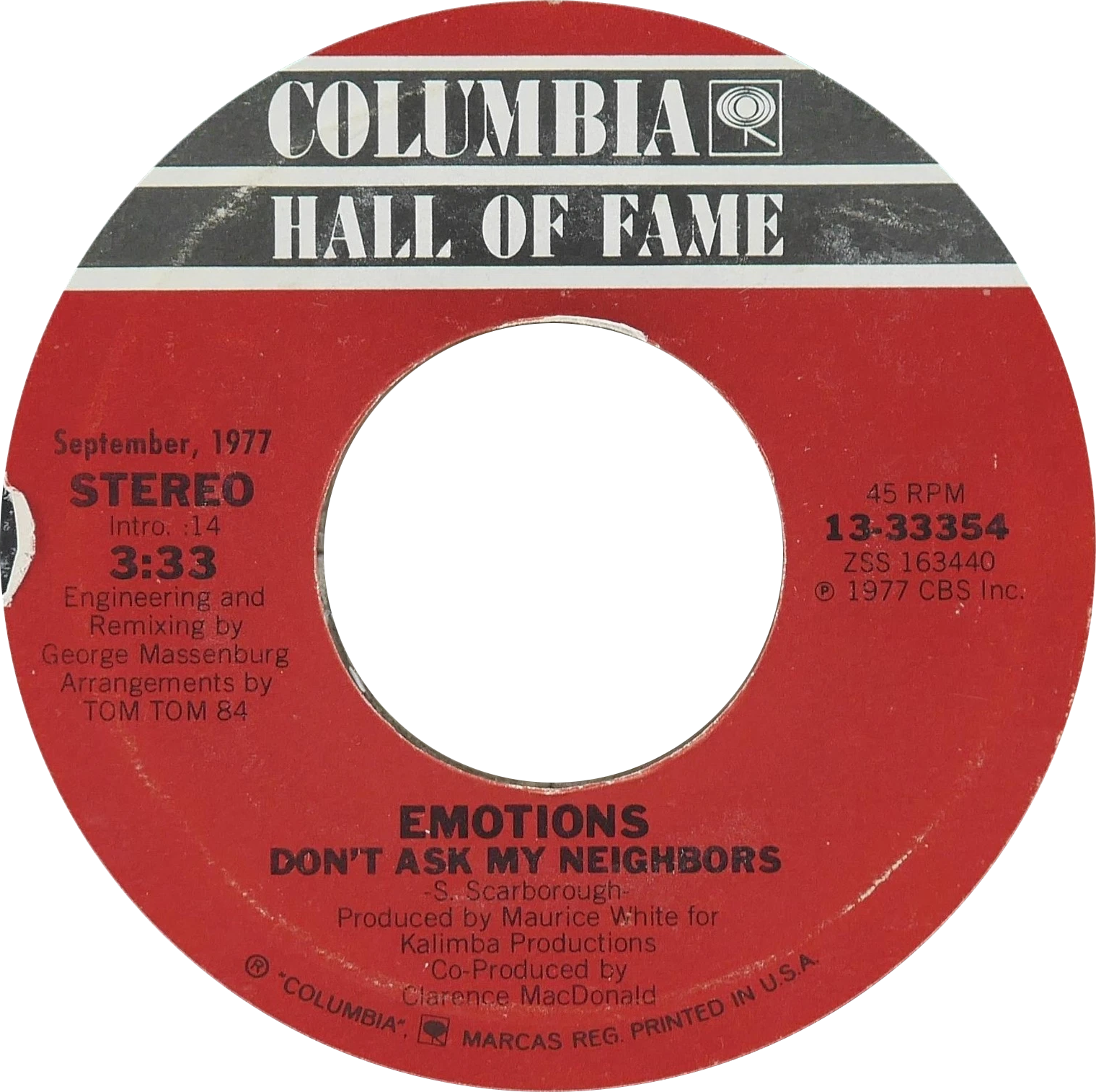
- One of US reissues

Single by the Emotions

from the album Rejoice
- B-side: "Love's What's Happenin'"
- Released: 1977
- Genre: Pop, R&B
- Length: 3:33
- Label: Columbia
- Songwriter: Skip Scarborough
- Producer: Maurice White

The Emotions singles chronology
"Best of My Love" (1977)	"Don't Ask My Neighbors" (1977)	"Shouting Out Love" (1977)

"Don't Ask My Neighbors" is a song recorded by R&B group the Emotions for their album Rejoice, released as a single in 1977 by Columbia Records. The single reached No. 7 on the Billboard Hot Soul Singles chart.

== Overview ==
"Don't Ask My Neighbors" was composed by Skip Scarborough and produced by EWF bandleader Maurice White.

The single's B-side was "Love's What's Happenin'". Both songs came from the Emotions' 1977 album Rejoice.

== Critical reception ==
Craig Lytle of AllMusic stated that "'Don't Ask My Neighbor[s]' came on a mellower note" when compared to the album's "spirited" first single "Best of My Love".

== In other media ==
"Don't Ask My Neighbors" was featured in "#LuvIzLuv (SEXUALITY IS FLUID)", a 2017 season one episode of the series She's Gotta Have It.

== Charts ==
Chart (1977–1978)	Peak position
US Billboard Hot 100	44
US Hot Soul Singles (Billboard)	7

== Notable covers ==
- American female group Jade recorded a version for their debut album Jade to the Max (1992).
- American actresses Tisha Campbell and Tichina Arnold recorded a version together and released it as a single for the soundtrack Sprung (1997).
- American female group Brownstone recorded a version for the soundtrack New York Undercover: A Night At Natalie's (1998).
