= Sunshine (The Emotions album) =

Studio album by the Emotions
- Released: November 1977
- Genre: R&B, soul
- Label: Stax
- Producer: Al Bell (tracks: A1, B1, B4, B3), Al Jackson, Jr. (tracks: A2, A4, A5, B3), Jim Stewart (tracks: A2, A4), Jo Hutchinson (tracks: A3, B2), Marvell Thomas (tracks: A1, B1, B4), Pervis Staples (tracks: A3, A5), William C. Brown III (tracks: A1, B1, B4)

The Emotions chronology
Rejoice (1977)	Sunshine (1977)	Sunbeam (1978)

Sunshine is an album by American girl group the Emotions, released in November 1977 by Stax Records. The album reached No. 39 on the Billboard Top Soul Albums chart. The Emotions covered Bill Withers' "Ain't No Sunshine" and Carla Thomas' "Gee Whiz (Look at His Eyes)" on the album.

== Critical reception ==
Professional ratings
Review scores
Source	Rating
AllMusic	3/5 stars
Record Mirror	3.5/5 stars
Rolling Stone	3/5 stars

Dave Marsh of Rolling Stone called Sunshine "harder edged, more classically soulful than (Rejoice)." John Storm Roberts of High Fidelity wrote: "Fantasy Records has begun reissuing some of the old Stax catalog, and "Sunshine" is part of that venture-a bunch of singles backed by Stax house musicians, none of them previously released on albums. The result is pure and amazingly cohesive joy. Without once departing from the classic framework of female group rhythm & blues, "Sunshine" is as rich and varied as anything I've heard in months. With only one exception, Any Way You Look at It, every number positively drips with tasty touches in arrangement, singing. and playing."

John Shearlaw of Record Mirror said, "Old Emotions, new Emotions-they're just as good." Phyl Garland of Stereo Review commented: "Sunshine sounds amazingly fresh. Vocal artistry prevails over background effects as the Emotions weave their way in and out of cool, melodious songs."

Andrew Hamilton of AllMusic wrote retrospectively: "Sunshine has some excellent cuts and some that don't quite fit the Chicagoans' style."

== Singles ==
The song "Shouting Out Love" peaked at No. 31 on the Billboard Hot Soul Songs chart.

== Track listing ==
No.	Title	Writer(s)	Length
1.	"Shouting Out Love"	Carl Smith	3:15
2.	"Gee Whiz (Look at His Eyes)"	Carla Thomas	3:23
3.	"I Really Miss You"	Wanda Hutchinson	3:17
4.	"Ain't No Sunshine"	Bill Withers	4:45
5.	"Runnin' Back (And Forth)"	Sir Mack Rice, Eddie Floyd	2:56
6.	"Anyway You Look At It"	Carl Smith, Wilkes	3:54
7.	"Baby I'm Through"	Joe Hutchinson	4:12
8.	"Innocent"	Bettye Crutcher, Lester Snell	3:11
9.	"Put a Little Love Away"	Dennis Lambert, Brian Potter	5:18

== Personnel ==
The Emotions

- Sheila Hutchinson - vocals
- Theresa Davis - vocals
- Wanda Hutchinson - vocals

with:

- Bobby Manuel, Michael Toles - guitar
- Donald Dunn, Earl Thomas - bass guitar
- Lester Snell, Marvell Thomas, Ronnie Williams - keyboards
- Willie Hall, Al Jackson Jr. - drums
- The Memphis Horns - brass
- The Detroit Strings - strings
- The Memphis Symphony - orchestra
- Dale Warren, James Mitchell, Johnny Allen - arrangements
