= Star (Earth, Wind & Fire song) =

1979 single by Earth, Wind & Fire

Single by Earth, Wind & Fire

from the album I Am
- B-side: "You and I"
- Released: September 1979
- Recorded: 1978
- Genre: R&B
- Length: 3:40
- Label: ARC/Columbia
- Songwriters: Allee Willis, Eduardo Del Barrio and Maurice White
- Producer: Maurice White

Earth, Wind & Fire singles chronology
"In The Stone" (1979)	"Star" (1979)	"Can't Let Go" (1980)

"Star" is a song by the R&B/funk band Earth, Wind & Fire, released as a single in September 1979 on ARC/Columbia Records. The single reached No. 16 on the UK Singles Chart.

== Overview ==
"Star" was produced by Maurice White and written by White, Allee Willis and Eduardo Del Barrio. The single's b-side was a song called "You and I". Both songs came from EW&F's 1979 studio album I Am.

== Critical reception ==
Ace Adams of the New York Daily News called "Star" one of the album's "best songs". Simon Ludgate of Record Mirror exclaimed "You can take EWF on many different levels. Some call them disco, some see them as cosmic. Whatever, no one will deny they are excellent...That's all, nuff said." Allen Weiner of Morning Call found that "Star a follow-up to EW&F's smash "Shining Star" is a powerful, melodic song that out-boogies such masters of funk as Parliament Funkadelic." Cash Box called it a "crackling pop-funk number, which moves from a somber keyboard intro into a joyous, upbeat rhyme." Record World said that it has Earth, Wind & Fire's "trademark falsetto vocals, spirited horn charts and energetic dance beat." James Johnson of the Evening Standard proclaimed "the slightly curious cosmic overtones of their lyrics remain in evidence on..Star".

== Personnel ==
- Writing, lyrics - Allee Willis, Eddie Del Barrio, Maurice White
- Producer - Maurice White

Producer

- Arranger - Tom Tom 84
- Programmer - Steve Porcaro

=== Engineers ===
- Engineer - George Massenburg, Tom Perry
- Mixing Engineer - George Massenburg
- Assistant engineer - Craig Widby, Ross Pallone

== Charts ==
=== Weekly charts ===
Chart (1979–1980)	Peak position
Belgium (Ultratop 50 Flanders)	25
Netherlands (Dutch Top 40)	9
Netherlands (Single Top 100)	15
UK Singles (OCC)	16
US Billboard Hot 100	64
US Hot R&B/Hip-Hop Songs (Billboard)	47

=== Year-end charts ===
Chart (1979)	Position
Netherlands (Dutch Top 40)	95
