= Sunbeam (album) =

Studio album by the Emotions
- Released: April 7, 1978
- Recorded: 1977–78
- Studio: Sunset Sound, Hollywood, California; Hollywood Sound Recorders, Los Angeles, California
- Genre: R&B, soul
- Label: Columbia
- Producer: Maurice White

The Emotions chronology
Sunshine (1977)	Sunbeam (1978)	Come into Our World (1979)

Sunbeam is the fifth studio album by the girl group the Emotions, issued in April 1978 on Columbia Records. The album rose to No. 12 on the Billboard Top Soul Albums chart and No. 40 on the Billboard 200 chart. Sunbeam has been certified Gold in the US by the RIAA.

== Critical reception ==
Professional ratings
Review scores
Source	Rating
AllMusic	3/5 stars
The Kansas City Star	(favourable)
The Virgin Encyclopedia of R&B and Soul	3/5 stars

John Storm Roberts of High Fidelity stated that "Sunbeam sparkles with good tracks." Phyl Garland of Stereo Review wrote that "Sunbeam is from the same mold as 'Rejoice'—and a very good mold it is—though the outcome here falls just a bit short of the previous opus." Garland also called Sunbeam a "very good" recording with a "polished, but not slick" performance by the Emotions. Glenn Clark of The Morning Call wrote: "The best thing I can say about this LP is that I like it. The Emotions' brand of snappy and upbeat soul is good for my soul. Maurice White, guru of Earth, Wind & Fire, produced this album, and I think he has blended well the talent he has brought together."

Craig Lytle of AllMusic found that, "as White's signature can be detected throughout most of the compositions, he is humble enough to leave room for the Emotions to flourish vocally."

== Track listing ==
Side one
No.	Title	Writer(s)	Length
1.	"Smile"	Maurice White, Al McKay	3:15
2.	"Love Is Right On"	Joseph Hutchinson, Jr., Keith Henderson	4:19
3.	"Time Is Passing By"	Joseph Hutchinson	3:19
4.	"Walking the Line"	Maurice White, Skip Scarborough	5:21
5.	"Ain't No Doubt About It"	Sheila Hutchinson Whitt	3:18

Side two
No.	Title	Writer(s)	Length
6.	"Love Vibes"	Jeanette Hawes, Lonnie Reaves	3:12
7.	"I Wouldn't Lie"	Jon Lind, Fred Tacker	4:33
8.	"My Everything"	Pamela Hutchinson, Wanda Hutchinson, Thomas McClary	3:42
9.	"Spirit of Summer"	Eumir Deodato	2:23
10.	"Whole Lot of Shakin'"	Maurice White, Al McKay	3:18
11.	"Music Box"	Maurice White	0:40

== Personnel ==
The Emotions

- Wanda Hutchinson – vocals
- Sheila Hutchinson Whitt – vocals
- Jeanette Hawes – vocals

Musicians

- Terry L. Mashall, Skip Scarborough – keyboards
- Charles "Chuck-A-Luck" Hosch, Gary Grainger, Verdine White – bass
- Keith Henderson, Marlo Henderson, Jon Lind, Al McKay – guitars
- Donzell Davis, Fred White, Maurice White – drums
- Paulinho da Costa, Earl DeRouen – percussion
- Victor Feldman – vibes
- Oscar Brashear, Rahm Lee Davis, Chuck Findley, Michael Harris – trumpets
- George Bohanon, Louis Satterfield, Maurice Spears – trombones
- Barbara Korn, Sidney Muldrow, Alan Robinson, Gale Robinson, Marilyn Robinson – French horns
- Donald Myrick, George Patterson, Jr. – saxophones
- Murray Adler, Harry Bluestone, Ron Clark, Assa Drori, Ronald Folsom, Frank Foster, Janice Gower, Endre Granat, William Henderson, Davida Lou Johnson, Bernard Kundrell, Joseph Livoti, Joy Lyle, Stanley Plummer, Nathan Ross, Sheldon Sanov, Ilkka Talvi – violins
- Samuel Boghossian, Denyce Buffum, Gareth Nuttycombe – violas
- Armand Kaproff, Dennis Karmazyn, Raymond Kelley – cellos
- Tom Tom 84 (Thomas Washington) – horn and string arrangements

Technical

- Tom Perry – engineer
- Andy Engel – album design
- Jürgen Reisch – photography

== Charts ==
Chart (1978)	Peak
U.S. Billboard Top LPs	40
U.S. Billboard Top Soul LPs	12

Singles

Year	Single	Peak chart positions
Year	Single	US R&B
1978	"Smile"	6
1978	"Whole Lot of Shakin'"	44
1979	"Walking the Line"	58
