= Yamaha Broad Bass =

Yamaha model of bass guitar

- Manufacturer: Yamaha Corporation
- Period: 1977–2015, 2017–present

Hardware
- Pickup(s): Usually a split single-coil, and "blade" single-coil

Colors available
- Rose-burst, natural, white, black, blue, etc.

The Yamaha Broad Bass (often abbreviated as BB), is the third model of bass originally produced by Yamaha, first released in 1977.

== Description ==
The BB Bass is differentiated from the Yamaha Super Bass, a Yamaha version of Fender's Fender Jazz Bass, and the Yamaha Precision Bass, which is Yamaha's version of Fender's Fender Precision Bass by the neck-through body, and the pick-up and body shape.

The Broad Bass was conceived to pander to a western audience, after the SB and PB basses almost only sold in Japan.

== History ==
The Broad Bass 1200 was first released in 1977, the first model of BB, as the premium version of the BB Bass, the BB1000 and BB800 models were also released in different price ranges. All three models of the original BB only had a single-coil split pick-up, similar to the Fender Precision, although this pickup was reverse mounted.

One year later, Yamaha released the BB2000, a higher-end model, with an added "Blade" Jazz-Bass style pick-up. A fretless version was released also.

Four years later, in 1982, Yamaha released the BB3000, an even higher end BB, and the reverse "P" pickup was changed to a regular "P" pickup. Two years after, in 1984, Yamaha released the BB5000, one of the first mass-produced five string basses.

Broad Basses are still produced today, under models like the P34, or 734.

== Notable players ==
- Paul McCartney played a BB1200 in Paul McCartney and Wings from 1977 to 1985, this bass was auctioned off for US$496,100, making it the most expensive auctioned bass guitar ever.
- Peter Hook played a Broad Bass in Joy Division, and plays a BB734a now. Yamaha currently produces a BBPH signature model for him, loosely based on the design of the BB1200.
- Verdine White played a custom BB2000 in Earth, Wind and Fire, with an Egyptian design embedded in the body, as seen in Let's Groove and Boogie Wonderland, he also has used a BB3000 for a performance at the White House.
- Tetsuo Sakurai played a BB2000 in Casiopea from 1980 to 1984, and Yamaha produced a signature model BB for him in 1984, although was never sold commercially.
