= I Don't Wanna Lose Your Love (The Emotions song) =

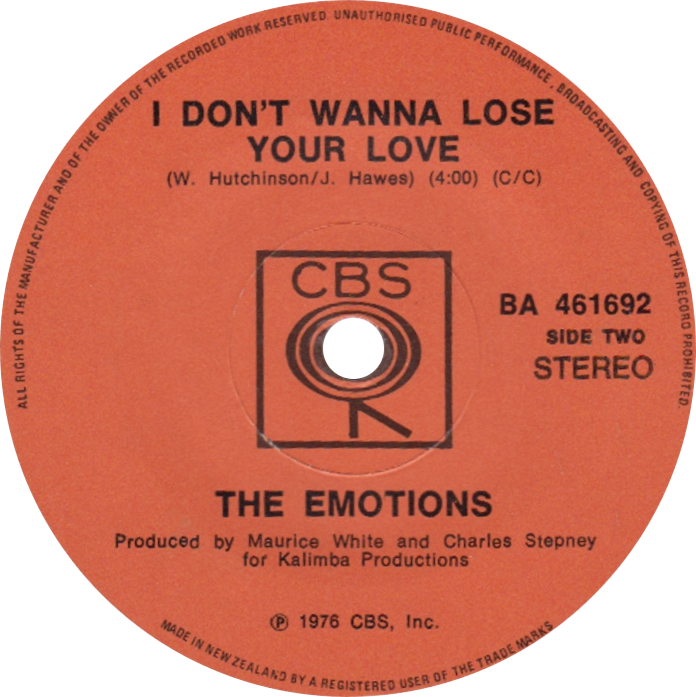
- Side two of the New Zealand single

Single by The Emotions

from the album Flowers
- A-side: "Flowers"
- Released: 1976
- Genre: Pop, R&B
- Length: 4:57
- Label: Columbia
- Songwriters: Wanda Hutchinson, Jeanette Hawes
- Producers: Maurice White, Charles Stepney

The Emotions singles chronology
"Flowers" (1976)	"I Don't Wanna Lose Your Love" (1976)	"Best of My Love" (1977)

"I Don't Wanna Lose Your Love" is a song recorded by R&B group the Emotions for their 1976 album Flowers. It was released a single by Columbia Records, reaching No. 13 on the Billboard Hot Soul Singles chart and No. 4 on the Billboard Hot Dance Club Play chart.

== Overview ==
"I Don't Wanna Lose Your Love" was written by Wanda Hutchinson and Jeanette Hawes.

== Critical reception ==
Amy Hanson of AllMusic described "I Don't Wanna Lose Your Love" as a song that "sizzled with Verdine White's classic, elastic bass".

== Covers and samples ==
"I Don't Wanna Lose Your Love" was covered by B Angie B as the lead single of her self-titled 1991 album. Her version debuted at No. 11 on the US Hot R&B Singles chart, then peaked at No. 54 on the Billboard Hot 100 and No. 2 on the US Hot R&B Singles chart.

The song was also sampled by rock band Primal Scream on the track "Loaded" on their 1991 album Screamadelica.
