= Show Me How (The Emotions song) =

1971 song by The Emotions

Single by The Emotions

from the album Untouched
- B-side: "Boss Love Maker"
- Released: September 1971
- Genre: Soul; R&B
- Length: 3:04
- Label: Volt
- Songwriter(s): Isaac Hayes; David Porter
- Producer(s): Isaac Hayes; David Porter

The Emotions singles chronology
| "Heart Association" (1970) | "Show Me How" (1971) | "Flowers" (1976) |

"Show Me How" is a song recorded by R&B group the Emotions for their 1971 album Untouched. It was released as the album's first single in September 1971 by Volt Records and reached No. 11 on the Cashbox Top R&B Singles chart and No. 13 on the Billboard Hot R&B Singles chart.

== Overview ==
"Show Me How" was produced and arranged by Isaac Hayes who composed the song along with David Porter. With a duration of 3 minutes and 4 seconds the song was arranged by Hayes and Dale Warren.

== Critical reception ==
Cashbox called "Show Me How" an "enticing ballad".

== Samples ==
"Show Me How" was sampled by Awon on the track "Undefeated" from his 2013 album For the Grimy (Searching for Soulville).
