= Gee Whiz (Look at His Eyes) =

1960 single by Carla Thomas

Single by Carla Thomas

from the album Gee Whiz
- B-side: "For You"
- Released: November 1960
- Recorded: August 1960
- Genre: Memphis soul
- Length: 2:15
- Label: Atlantic
- Songwriter: Carla Thomas
- Producer: Chips Moman

Carla Thomas singles chronology
"Cause I Love You" (1960)	"Gee Whiz (Look at His Eyes)" (1960)	"A Love of My Own" (1961)

"Gee Whiz"

Single by Bernadette Peters

from the album Bernadette
- B-side: "I Never Thought I'd Break"
- Released: March 1980
- Recorded: 1979
- Genre: Easy listening
- Length: 2:33
- Label: MCA
- Songwriter: Carla Thomas
- Producer: Brooks Arthur

Bernadette Peters singles chronology
"Heartquake" (1980)	"Gee Whiz" (1980)	"Pearl's a Singer" (1980)

"Gee Whiz (Look at His Eyes)" is a song written and performed by Carla Thomas. It reached #5 on the U.S. R&B chart and #10 on the U.S. pop chart in 1961. It was featured on her 1961 album Gee Whiz.

The song was produced by Chips Moman.

The song ranked #62 on Billboard magazine's Top 100 singles of 1961.

== Other versions ==
- Bernadette Peters released a version of the song as a single in 1980 which reached #3 on the adult contemporary chart and #31 on the U.S. pop chart.
- The Crystals released a version of the song on their 1962 album Twist Uptown.
- The Orlons released a version of the song on their 1963 album Not Me.
- Fontella Bass released a version of the song on her 1966 album The 'New' Look.
- Nella Dodds released a version of the song as a single in 1966, but it did not chart.
- The Casinos released a version of the song on their 1967 album Then You Can Tell Me Goodbye.
- Richard "Dimples" Fields released a version of the song on his 1977 album Ready for Anything.
- The Emotions released a version of the song on their 1977 album Sunshine.
- Cherrelle released a version of the song on her 1991 album The Woman I Am.
