= My Honey and Me =

1972 song by The Emotions

Single by The Emotions
- B-side: "Blind Alley"
- Released: 1972
- Genre: Soul; R&B
- Length: 3:30
- Label: Volt
- Songwriter(s): John Mc Farland; Luther Ingram
- Producer(s): Al Jackson Jr.; Jim Stewart

The Emotions singles chronology
"My Honey and Me" (1972)	"I Could Never Be Happy" (1972)

"My Honey and Me" is a song by R&B group The Emotions released as a single in 1972 on Stax Records.

== Overview ==
My Honey and Me was produced by Al Jackson Jr. and Jim Stewart. The song was also composed by John McFarland and Luther Ingram. The single's b-side was a song called Blind Alley from The Emotions' 1972 album Untouched.

== Reception ==
One of the picks of the week in the 4 March, 1972 issue of Cash Box, the song was described as "Tom-tom percussion on a breeze of ladyfunk harmonies". It was also referred to as a sequel to the success of their other record, "Show Me How".

Listed as one of the Hits of the Week on the front cover of the 4 March issue of Record World, the reviewer said that there was no way that this song won't make it. In her Soul Truth column of the same issue, Dede Dabney noted the soft tonal subtlety that the Emotions were known for. She also predicted it was another hit.

== Chart ==
The single reached No. 18 on the Billboard Hot R&B Singles chart.

With the song making its debut at no. 112 in the Cash Box Looking Ahead chart on the week of 4 March 1972, it had also made its debut at no. 59 in the Cash Box R&B TOP 60 chart. It peaked at no. 24 on the week of 29 April.

The record made its debut at no. 91 in the Cash Box Top 100 chart on the week of 11 March, 1972. It peaked at no. 85 the following week during its three-week chart run.

== Other versions ==
Anthony Swete recorded a version of the song which was backed with "Rainy Night in Georgia". It was released in Australia on RCA Twin Hits PPX-1005 in 1970. Swete's version was also included on the Now Sounds compilation, released on Cornwall Records, Inc. LG101.
