= You're the Best (The Emotions song) =

Single by The Emotions

from the album Sincerely
- Released: 1984
- Genre: Pop, R&B
- Label: Red Label
- Songwriters: Billy Osborne, Zane Giles
- Producers: Billy Osborne, Zane Giles

The Emotions singles chronology
"You're the One" (1984)	"You're the Best" (1984)

"You're the Best" is a song recorded by R&B group the Emotions released as a single in 1984 on Red Label Records. The single reached No. 33 on the Billboard Dance Club Songs chart.

== Background ==
You're the Best was composed and produced by Billy Osborne and Zane Giles. The song came from the Emotions 1984 studio album Sincerely.

== Critical reception ==
Dave Hillson of Blues & Soul called the song an "80s boogie classic".
