= Shouting Out Love =

Single by The Emotions

from the album Sunshine
- B-side: "Baby I'm Through"
- Released: October 1977
- Genre: Pop, R&B
- Length: 3:12
- Label: Stax
- Songwriter(s): Carl Smith
- Producer(s): Al Bell, William Brown, Marvell Thomas

"Shouting Out Love" is a song recorded by R&B group the Emotions issued as a single in October 1977 by Stax Records from the group's album Sunshine. The single reached No. 12 on the Cashbox R&B singles chart and No. 31 on the Billboard Hot Soul Singles chart.

== Overview ==
"Shouting Out Love" was composed by Carl Smith and produced by Al Bell, William Brown and Marvell Thomas.

== Critical reception ==
Andrew Hamilton of AllMusic described "Shouting Out Love" as a song with "a good beat, a great hook, and sensational vocals."

== Appearances in Other Media ==
Shouting Out Love also appeared upon the soundtrack of 2012 feature film The Sapphires.

== Charts ==
Chart (1978)	Peak position
U.S. Cashbox Top R&B Singles	12
U.S. Billboard Hot Soul Singles	31
