= What Do the Lonely Do at Christmas =

1973 song by The Emotions

Single by The Emotions
- B-side: "What Do The Lonely Do At Christmas (Instrumental Version)"
- Released: 1973
- Genre: Soul; R&B
- Length: 3:24
- Label: Stax
- Songwriter(s): Carl Hampton; Homer Banks
- Producer(s): Al Bell

The Emotions singles chronology
"Peace Be Still" (1973)	"What Do the Lonely Do at Christmas" (1973)	"Put a Little Love Away" (1973)

"What Do the Lonely Do at Christmas" is a song recorded by R&B group the Emotions, released in 1973 by Stax Records. The single peaked at No. 2 on the Billboard R&B/Hip-Hop Airplay Recurrents chart in 2006.

== Overview ==
"What Do the Lonely Do at Christmas" was produced by Al Bell. The song was composed by Carl Hampton and Homer Banks. The single's B-side was an instrumental version of "What Do the Lonely Do at Christmas".

"What Do the Lonely Do at Christmas" also appeared on the Emotions 2004 compilation album Songs of Innocence and Experience.

== Critical reception ==
Allen Thayer of Wax Poetics called What Do the Lonely Do at Christmas "a killer soul song that happens to be set at Christmas time and includes some subtle yet tasteful aural accents to give it that wintery, cold, and lonely feel."

== Covers ==
What Do the Lonely Do at Christmas has been covered by Patti LaBelle on her 2007 album Miss Patti's Christmas and Anthony Hamilton on his 2014 album Home for the Holidays.
