= So I Can Love You (song) =

1969 song by the Emotions

Single by The Emotions

from the album So I Can Love You
- B-side: "Got to Be the Man"
- Released: 1969
- Genre: Soul; R&B
- Length: 2:49
- Label: Volt/Stax
- Songwriter: Sheila Hutchinson
- Producers: Isaac Hayes, David Porter

"So I Can Love You" is a song by R&B group The Emotions released as a single in 1969 on Volt/Stax Records. The tune peaked at No. 3 on the US Billboard Hot Rhythm & Blues Singles chart and No. 39 on the Billboard Hot 100.

== Overview ==
"So I Can Love You" was written by group member Sheila Hutchinson and produced by Isaac Hayes and David Porter. The B-side of this single was "Got to Be the Man" with both songs coming from the Emotions' 1969 album So I Can Love You.

== Cover version ==
- The Marvelettes' member Wanda Young recorded the song for their album The Return of The Marvelettes in 1970. Although the song is credited to The Marvelettes, the recording only features Young who is backed by Motown session group The Andantes.
