= Flowers (The Emotions album) =

1976 studio album

Studio album by The Emotions
- Released: June 1976
- Studio: P.S. Recording Studios, Chicago, Illinois
- Genre: R&B, soul
- Length: 28:40
- Label: Columbia/CBS
- Producer: Maurice White, Charles Stepney

The Emotions chronology
Untouched (1971)	Flowers (1976)	Rejoice (1977)

Flowers is a studio album by the American girl group The Emotions, released in 1976 by Columbia Records. The album reached No. 5 on the Billboard Top R&B albums chart. Flowers has been certified Gold in the US by the RIAA.

== Overview ==
The group's first LP on Columbia Records, Flowers was produced by Charles Stepney and Maurice White of Earth, Wind and Fire. The album was reissued with an 8-page booklet, liner notes, and a bonus track in 2012.

== Critical reception ==
Professional ratings
Review scores
Source	Rating
AllMusic	3/5 stars
The Encyclopedia of Popular Music	3/5 stars
Rolling Stone	(favourable)
The Rolling Stone Album Guide	3/5 stars
Village Voice	B
Melody Maker	(favourable)

With a B grade, Robert Christgau of The Village Voice wrote, "Earth, Wind & Fire's girl group--literally. Whether it's Jeanette, Sheila, or Wanda who sounds like Diana Ross at a higher level of consciousness, the effect is exquisite." Amy Hanson of Allmusic, in a retrospective 3-out-of-5-star review, opined "Revamping their classic girl group soul sounds to incorporate the more eclectic nuances of (Maurice) White's production, the resultant brassed-up disco proved to be on target." She added, "With fellow Earth, Wind & Fire members Verdine and Fred White adding their unmistakable chops to the sound, the Emotions ultimately emerged with an absolutely stunning brew that kept their powerful vocal harmonies well spotlighted, while adding more than a little funk to the sound." Jim Arundel of Melody Maker also called Flowers "an incredibly short but definitely sweet album."

== Singles ==
The album's title track got to No.16 on the US Billboard Hot Soul Songs chart and No.2 on the NZ Top 40 Singles chart. Another single, "I Don't Wanna Lose Your Love", reached No. 4 on the US Billboard Dance/Club Play Songs chart and No.13 on the US Billboard Hot Soul Songs chart.

== Track listing ==
Side one
No.	Title	Writer(s)	Length
1.	"I Don't Wanna Lose Your Love"	Wanda Hutchinson, Jeanette Hawes	4:01
2.	"Me for You"	Clarence McDonald, Fritz Baskett	4:17
3.	"You've Got the Right to Know"	Wanda Hutchinson	2:36
4.	"We Go Through Changes"	Wanda Hutchinson, Henry Hicks, Jr.	0:55
5.	"Special Part"	Deniece Williams, Clarence McDonald, Lani Groves	3:52
Total length:			15:41

Side two
No.	Title	Writer(s)	Length
6.	"No Plans for Tomorrow"	Wanda Hutchinson, Henry Hicks, Jr.	3:44
7.	"How Can You Stop Loving Someone"	Wanda Hutchinson	4:14
8.	"Flowers"	Maurice White, Al McKay	4:28
9.	"God Will Take Care of You"	Civilla D. Martin, Walter S. Martin	0:33
Total length:			12:59

2012 remastered bonus track
No.	Title	Length
10.	"Flowers" (Single Version)	3:43

== Personnel ==
The Emotions

- Sheila Hutchinson – vocals
- Wanda Hutchinson – vocals
- Jeanette Hutchinson – vocals

Musicians

- Verdine White – bass
- Larry Dunn – keyboards
- Al McKay, Joe Hutchinson Jr. – guitars
- Fred White – drums, percussion
- Oscar Brashear, Michael Harris – trumpets
- Don Myrick – alto saxophone
- Richard Brown – tenor saxophone
- Louis Satterfield – trombone
- Tom Tom 84 (Thomas Washington) – arranger

Technical

- Recorded by Paul Serrano
- Ron Coro, Tom Steele – design
- Norman Seeff – photography

== Charts ==
Chart (1976)	Peak
U.S. Billboard Top LPs	45
U.S. Billboard Top Soul LPs	5

Singles

Year	Single	Peak chart positions				
Year	Single	US Pop	US R&B	US Dan	NZ	UK Pop
1976	"Flowers"	87	16	—	2	—
1976	"I Don't Wanna Lose Your Love"	51	13	4		40
