= After the Love Has Gone =

1979 single by Earth, Wind & Fire

Single by Earth, Wind & Fire

from the album I Am
- B-side: "Rock That!"
- Released: July 1979
- Genre: R&B; smooth soul
- Length: 4:31 (album); 3:55 (7" single)
- Label: ARC/Columbia
- Composers: David Foster; Jay Graydon
- Lyricist: Bill Champlin
- Producer: Maurice White

Earth, Wind & Fire singles chronology
"Boogie Wonderland" (1979)	"After the Love Has Gone" (1979)	"In the Stone" (1979)

Music video
- "After the Love Has Gone" on YouTube

"After the Love Has Gone" is a song by Earth, Wind & Fire, released in 1979 as the second single from their ninth studio album I Am on ARC/Columbia Records. The song reached No. 2 on both the US Billboard Hot 100 (behind the Knack's "My Sharona") and the Billboard Hot R&B Singles chart, No. 3 on the Billboard Adult Contemporary chart, and No. 4 on the UK Singles Chart. "After the Love Has Gone" was certified gold in the US by the RIAA and silver in the UK by the BPI.

== Background ==
"After the Love Has Gone" was produced by Maurice White and written by David Foster, Jay Graydon, and Bill Champlin. The single's B-side is "Rock That!". Both songs appear on Earth, Wind & Fire's 1979 album I Am.

The song dates back to when David Foster was working on an album for Motown Records singer Jaye P. Morgan. The album was released in Japan and never took off in the United States. Foster later went to Motown to let the executives hear some of the material. Foster was in the middle of a song and ad-libbed the chorus to "After The Love Has Gone", as he had forgotten the words. Foster and Jay Graydon then asked Bill Champlin to write lyrics to the music after Graydon had come up with an idea for the verse. At the time, Foster was producing Champlin's 1978 solo debut Single for Full Moon/Epic Records and was working with Earth, Wind & Fire around the time they were recording their album I Am. Foster then showed Maurice White the song, which White loved and wanted to record. Foster and Graydon later told Champlin that the song would be removed from his album for inclusion on Earth, Wind & Fire's album, which Champlin allowed. According to former manager turned Sony Music Entertainment CEO Tommy Mottola, Foster previously offered the song to Hall and Oates, but they rejected it as they were interested in performing only their own material.

Graydon commented about the song's background:

David and I also recorded the song for the Airplay album, but that was not a problem since the EWF version was released before the Airplay album. By the way, the Airplay version is the original version of the song with the verses in the key of A. The EWF version verses are in the key of F, using a 'shotgun pivot chord' halfway through the B section as to get in the proper key for the choruses. Note that the EWF version features the high harmony part in the choruses, which makes the listener think that is the melody! That always bothered me since it is very difficult for one singer to sing the song as the vocal range is much too wide.

Earth, Wind & Fire bassist Verdine White called "After the Love Has Gone" one of the group's most difficult songs to record:

"The track was based on a vibe. We cut it about six, seven times, and Maurice just said, 'No, it's not right yet. We'll come back and get it tomorrow. It's not right yet.'" And then one day we nailed it, and it was right. The way it felt. It sounded like Earth, Wind & Fire".

== Critical reception ==
Caroline Sullivan of The Guardian described "After the Love Has Gone" as "an exercise in classic songcraft – the horn section's precise jabs and the exquisite harmonies dazzle" Rose Riggins of Gannett wrote Maurice White's "talents are vividly expressed through 'Wait' and 'After The Love is Gone.' But he has yet to recapture the enchantment of the previous recording of 'Love's Holiday' off the All-n-All album." Matthew Greenwald of Allmusic proclaimed that a "simple soul-based melody and groove underlines the bittersweet goodbye message of the lyrics. But it's the arrangement that captured audience's attention, as it combined the group's vocal counterpoint harmony genius in full glory. A swinging saxophone in the song's middle-eight bridge also added an element of jazz". Allen Weiner of Morning Call found that "After The Love Is Gone is perhaps the best ballad EW&F has ever recorded. It's sensitive and warm, and interesting enough to justify its four-minute length." Ace Adams of the New York Daily News called "After the Love Has Gone" one of the album's "best songs". Phyl Garland of Stereo Review noted that the song is "laced with unexpected Wonder-ful progressions". Cash Box said it is an "easy, smooth ballad, with...lush horn and vocal arrangements," "superb harmonies and jazzy sax work." Record World called it a "lovely ballad."

"After the Love Has Gone" was nominated for the Grammy Awards for Record of the Year and Song of the Year, and won Best R&B Vocal Performance by a Duo or Group for the band and Best R&B Song for Champlin, Foster, and Graydon. It also placed on Bruce Pollock's list of "The 7,500 Most Important Songs of 1944-2000".

A record of the single "After the Love Has Gone".

== Appearances in other media ==
The song was heard on an episode of WKRP in Cincinnati in a scene where staffer Bailey Quarters was brooding over being stood up on a planned date with morning drive DJ Johnny Fever.

The Houston Rockets played this song for losses, as would many other professional sports teams, including the Chicago White Sox, Philadelphia Phillies and Charlotte Hornets.

== Covers and samples ==
The original recording of "After the Love Has Gone" by Airplay, a band formed by Foster and Graydon, was released on their 1980 eponymous album following Earth, Wind & Fire's hit version, featuring Champlin on backing vocals. Stanley Turrentine also covered the song on his 1981 album Tender Togetherness.

In 1993, Graydon released a version of the song on his solo album Airplay for the Planet. Phil Perry's rendition of the tune featuring Vesta appeared on his 1994 album Pure Pleasure. David Benoit and Russ Freeman also covered the song on their 1994 collaboration album, The Benoit/Freeman Project. Jazz guitarist Norman Brown's rendition of the tune appeared on his 1996 album Better Days Ahead. 112 covered the tune on the 1998 album New York Undercover: A Night at Natalie's. Tommy Emmanuel and CDB released a version as the lead single from Emmanuel's 1998 album, Collaboration. The song peaked at number 74 in Australia.

British boy band Damage covered the song for their 2001 album Since You've Been Gone which reached No. 42 in the UK. In 2002, Donny Osmond covered the song on his album Somewhere in Time, and Martes 8:30, a Latin jazz group, covered the song on their album Sinceramente; this version is noted for having a female lead vocal and an extended sax solo by Ed Calle. Mint Condition's version appears on their 2007 album Interpretations: Celebrating the Music of Earth, Wind & Fire. Kurt Elling covered this song on his 2011 LP The Gate. Eric Benet's rendition features on his 2014 album From E to U: Volume 1.

== Personnel ==
- Music - David Foster, Jay Graydon
- Lyrics - Bill Champlin
- Producer - Maurice White
- Lead vocals - Maurice White
- Backing vocals - Maurice White and Philip Bailey
- Guitar - Johnny Graham
- Bass - Verdine White
- Drums - Fred White
- Oberheim and Moog synthesizers, piano - Larry Dunn
- Horn arrangement - Jerry Hey
- String arrangement - David Foster
- Alto saxophone solo - Don Myrick

Engineers

- Engineer - George Massenburg, Tom Perry
- Mixing Engineer - George Massenburg
- Assistant Engineer - Craig Widby, Ross Pallone

== Chart performance ==
=== Weekly charts ===
Chart (1979)	Peak position
Australia	62
Canada RPM Top Singles	11
Canada RPM Adult Contemporary	16
Ireland (IRMA)	8
New Zealand (RIANZ)	8
UK Singles Chart	4
U.S. Billboard Hot 100	2
U.S. Billboard Hot R&B Singles	2
U.S. Billboard Adult Contemporary	3
U.S. Cash Box Top 100	3

=== Year-end charts ===
Chart (1979)	Rank
Canada	85
UK	72
U.S. Billboard	38
U.S. Cash Box	42

== Certifications ==
Region	Certification	Certified units/sales
New Zealand (RMNZ)	Gold	15,000^{‡}
United Kingdom (BPI)	Silver	250,000^{^}
United States (RIAA)	Gold	1,000,000^{^}
^{^} Shipments figures based on certification alone.^{‡} Sales+streaming figures based on certification alone.
