= Sincerely (The Emotions album) =

Studio album by The Emotions
- Released: April 16, 1984
- Studio: Kendun, Burbank, California; Artisan, Hollywood, California; Red Wing, Studio City, California; Hollywood Sound, Hollywood, California; Ritesonian Recording Studio, Van Nuys, California
- Genre: R&B, soul
- Length: 1:12:31
- Label: Red Label
- Producer: Billy Osborne, Zane Giles

The Emotions chronology
New Affair (1981)	Sincerely (1984)	If I Only Knew (1985)

Sincerely is the seventh studio album of American vocal trio the Emotions, released in 1984 by Red Label Records. The album reached No. 3 on the UK Blues & Soul Hiplist chart and No. 33 on the US Billboard R&B albums chart.

== Critical reception ==
Professional ratings
Review scores
Source	Rating
AllMusic	3/5 stars
Blues & Soul	7/10

Giving a 7/10 rating Dave Hillson of Blues & Soul found that The Emotions "caught the mood of eighties Soul perfectly". Hugh Wyatt of the New York Daily News wrote "this album is top-shelf".

== Singles ==
"You're the One" reached No. 19 on the UK Blues & Soul Hiplist chart and No. 34 on the US Billboard Hot R&B Songs chart.

"You're the Best" also reached No. 33 on the US Billboard Dance Club Songs chart.

== Track listing ==
No.	Title	Writer(s)	Length
1.	"All Things Come in Time"	Wanda Vaughn, Wayne Vaughn	5:24
2.	"Are You Through with My Heart"	Marlo Henderson, Pat Henderson, Keg Johnson	3:52
3.	"You're the One"	Zane Giles, Billy Osborne	4:02
4.	"Can't Blow out the Candle"		3:56
5.	"Sincerely"	Keith Henderson, Sheila Hutchinson	4:16
6.	"You're the Best"	Zane Giles, Billy Osborne	6:18
7.	"You Know I'm the One"	Keith Henderson	4:57
8.	"Never Let Another"	Sheila Hutchinson, Wayne Vaughn	3:39
9.	"I Can Do Anything"	Wanda Vaughn, Wayne Vaughn	5:35
10.	"Eternally"	Zane Giles, Billy Osborne	4:40
11.	"The Good Times"	Zane Giles, Billy Osborne	4:12
12.	"Giving You All I Got"	Zane Giles, Billy Osborne	4:21
13.	"You're the Best"	Zane Giles, Billy Osborne	8:15
14.	"You're the Best"	Zane Giles, Billy Osborne	9:04
