= What's the Name of Your Love? =

Single by The Emotions

from the album Come into Our World
- B-side: "Layed Back"
- Released: 1979
- Genre: Pop, R&B
- Label: ARC/Columbia
- Lyricists: Allee Willis, David Foster, Maurice White
- Producer: Maurice White

The Emotions singles chronology
"Boogie Wonderland" (1979)	"What's the Name of Your Love?" (1979)	"I Should Be Dancing" (1979)

"What's the Name of Your Love?" is a song by R&B girl group The Emotions issued as a single in 1979 on ARC/Columbia Records. The song peaked at No. 25 on the Cashbox R&B Singles chart and No. 30 on the Billboard Hot Soul Singles chart.

== Overview ==
What's the Name of Your Love? was produced by Maurice White. White also composed the song with Allee Willis and David Foster. With a duration of three minutes and forty five seconds the song has an allegro tempo of 136 beats per minute.

The single's b-side is a song called Layed Back. What's the Name of Your Love? and Layed Back both appeared on the Emotions's 1979 studio album Come into Our World.

== Critical reception ==
Amy Hanson of Allmusic described What's the Name of Your Love? as a song which "combines snappy horns with breathless lyrics and is peppered throughout with very Moroder-esque Euro disco overtones". Billboard also called the song "a briskly paced tune".

== Samples ==
What's the Name of Your Love? was sampled by DJ Premier feat. Bumpy Knuckles and Sy Ari Da Kid on Premier's 2016 track Emoshunal Greed. J Dilla also sampled What's the Name of Your Love? on the song Coastin' off of his 2003 album Vol. 2: Vintage.

== Appearances in other media ==
During January 1980 The Emotions performed What's the Name of Your Love? on The Midnight Special. On February 8, 1980 the girl group also performed What's the Name of Your Love? upon Dinah!.
