= Come into Our World =

Studio album by the Emotions
- Released: October 1979
- Studios: Hollywood Sound, Los Angeles, California; Davlen, Los Angeles, California; Sound City, Los Angeles, California
- Genres: R&B; soul; disco
- Label: ARC/Columbia
- Producer: Maurice White

The Emotions chronology
Sunbeam (1978)	Come into Our World (1979)	New Affair (1981)

Come into Our World is a studio album by the girl group the Emotions, issued in October 1979 on ARC/Columbia Records. The album rose to No. 35 on the US Billboard Top Soul Albums chart and No. 36 on the UK Blues & Soul British Soul Albums chart. Come into Our World was produced by Maurice White, who went on to be Grammy nominated in the category of Producer of the Year Non-Classical.

== Overview ==
Come into Our World was produced by Maurice White. Artists such as David Foster and Ricky Lawson of the Yellowjackets appeared upon the album.

== Critical reception ==
Professional ratings
Review scores
Source	Rating
AllMusic	2.5/5 stars
Cashbox	(favourable)
The Kansas City Star	(favourable)

Phyl Garland of Stereo Review proclaimed that the LP was "made up of the sort of briskly invigorating and tuneful songs that reach right out and grab your ear". Garland added " Still, though White may well be the Svengali behind this trio of Trilbys, none of his magic would work if it were not for the energy and polish supplied and applied by the Emotions." Jon Wall of Melody Maker noted that "throughout Come into Our World The Emotions' superb vocal control, range and harmonic sense are displayed to maximum effect". He also proclaimed that "Come into Our World is one of the most appealing albums I've heard since Off the Wall. I can't get the album off the turntable and I don't want to".

Fred Murphy of Variety called the LP "a slick smooth production and a refreshing change of material for the group." Bill Rhedon of The Baltimore Sun found that "Like many of the 'Sound of Chicago' groups, the Emotions don't rely on audio gimmicks or super-polished stage presence for their success. Their only 'secrets' are great songwriters, who provide three sopranos with excellent material, and their musicians. Beyond that it's simply steady, unvarying 'Coming at You, Soul'. The nice thing about the Emotions on record is their consistent and even performance."

== Singles ==
"What's the Name of Your Love?" rose to No. 30 on the Billboard Hot R&B Songs chart. I Should Be Dancing also reached No. 41 on the Dutch Pop Singles chart.

== Track listing ==
No.	Title	Writer(s)	Length
1.	"What's the Name of Your Love"	Allee Willis, David Foster, Maurice White	3:44
2.	"Cause I Love You"	David Pruitt, Gary Glenn	3:40
3.	"Come into My World"	Wanda Hutchinson, Wayne Vaughn	4:40
4.	"On & On"	David Foster, Maurice White, Sheila Whitt	3:12
5.	"I Should Be Dancing"	Marlo Henderson	4:16
6.	"Where Is Your Love?"	Ross Vannelli	3:57
7.	"The Movie"	Allee Willis, David Foster, David Paich, Maurice White	4:10
8.	"Layed Back"	Wanda Hutchinson, Wayne Vaughn	3:08
9.	"Yes, I Am"	Ross Vannelli	4:04
10.	"My Baby Dance"

== Personnel ==
The Emotions

- Sheila Hutchinson – vocals
- Wanda Hutchinson – vocals
- Jeanette Hutchinson – vocals

Musicians

- Verdine White, Charles "Chuck-A-Luck" Hosch, Keni M. Burke – bass
- Wayne Vaughn, David Foster, David Paich, Gary Glenn, Tennyson Stevens – keyboards
- Roland Bautista, Marlo Henderson – guitars
- Fred White, Ricky Lawson, Steve Ferrone, Leon "Ndugu" Chancler – drums, syndrums, percussion
- Rahmlee Michael Davis, Bobby Bryant, Elmer Brown, Nolan A. Smith, Steve Madaio – trumpets
- Don Myrick, Fred Jackson, Jerome Richardson, Bill Greene– saxophones
- Paulinho da Costa – percussion
- Dorothy Jeanne Ashby – harp
- Alan Robinson, Marilyn Robinson – French horn
- Louis Satterfield, Garnett Brown, Lew McCreary, Maurice Spears – trombone
- Bernard Kundell, Carl LaMagna, David Frisina, David Montagu, Don Palmer, Endre Granat, Enro Neufeld, Frank Foster, Gina Kronstadt, Haim Shtrum, Harris Goldman, Harry Bluestone, Henry Ferber, Henry L. Roth, Ilkka Talvi, Israel Baker, Jack Gootkin, Janice Gower, Jerome Reisler, Jerome Webster, Joseph Goodman, Joy Lyle, Karen Jones, Lya Stern, Marcy Dicterow, Mari Botnick Tsumura, Mark Cargill, Marshall Sasson, Marvin Limonick, Nathan Ross, Norman Car, Pam Gates, Paul Shure, Pavel Farkas, Robert Lipsett, Ron Clark, Ronald Folsom, Tibor Zlig, Bill Henderson – violin
- Allan Harshman, David Schwartz, Gareth Nuttycombe, Herschel Wise, Jan Hlinka, James Ross, Linda Lipsett, Marilyn Baker, Myron Sadler, Patrick Morgan, Virginia Majewski, William Hymanson – viola
- Barbara H. Badgley, Daniel Rothmuller, Edgar Listgarten, Harry Schultz, Jacqueline Lustgarten, Julianna Buffum, Larry Corbett, Miguel Martinez, Ray Kramer, Robert L. Adcock, Ronald Cooper – cello
- Tom Tom 84 (Thomas Washington), Ben Wright, Greg Mathieson, Wade Marcus – arranger

Technical

- Engineered by George Massenburg, Mic Guzauski, Tom Perry
- Produced for Kalimba Productions
- Recorded at: Hollywood Sound Recorders, Davlen Sound Studios and Sound City Studios, Los Angeles, CA
- Mastered at The Mastering Lab

== Charts ==
Year	Chart	Peak
1979	U.S. Billboard Top Soul LPs	35
1979	U.S. Billboard 200	96
1980	U.S. Cashbox Top Soul Albums	23
1980	U.K. Blues & Soul Top British Soul Albums	36
