= So I Can Love You =

Studio album by The Emotions
- Released: 1969
- Studio: Memphis, Tennessee; Muscle Shoals, Alabama
- Genre: R&B; soul
- Label: Volt/Stax
- Producer: David Porter; Isaac Hayes

The Emotions chronology
So I Can Love You (1969)	Untouched (1971)

Singles from So I Can Love You
- 1. "So I Can Love You" Released: 1969; 2. "The Best Part of a Love Affair" Released: 1969

So I Can Love You is the debut studio album by the Emotions, released in 1969 on Volt/Stax Records.

== Reception ==
Professional ratings
Review scores
Source	Rating
AllMusic	3/5 stars
The Encyclopedia of Popular Music	3/5 stars

Ron Wynn of AllMusic stated "(The title track) was a nice bit of gospel-tinged soul, and was an indicator that the sisters weren't going to have any trouble turning to more earthly concerns."

== Singles ==
"So I Can Love You" peaked at No. 39 on the Billboard Hot 100 and No. 3 on the Billboard Hot R&B Singles chart. "The Best Part of a Love Affair" peaked at No. 27 on the Billboard R&B singles chart.

== Track listing ==
No.	Title	Writer(s)	Length
1.	"So I Can Love You"	Sheila Hutchinson	2:49
2.	"Somebody Wants What I Got"	Pervis Staples	3:10
3.	"Going on Strike"	Isaac Hayes, David Porter	2:37
4.	"I Found My Man"	Wanda Hutchinson	2:38
5.	"Got to Be the Man"	Hayes, Porter	2:47

No.	Title	Writer(s)	Length
1.	"The Best Part of a Love Affair"	Hayes, Porter	3:29
2.	"I Like It"	Hayes, Porter	2:27
3.	"My Letter"	Staples	3:44
4.	"Day Dreams"	Staples	3:16
5.	"It's Not Fair"	Joe Hutchinson	3:15
6.	"Two Lovers"	J. Hutchinson	3:02

== Personnel ==
- Shelia Hutchinson – lead vocals Side 1 Track 1- Side 2 Track 1,2,3 and 5
- Wanda Hutchinson – vocals Side 1 lead vocals on track 2 and 3. Shared leads on Tracks 4 and 5. Side 2 Track 6
- Jeanette Hutchinson – vocals Shared lead vocals side 1 Tracks 4 and 5.Lead vocals side 2 track 4

== Charts ==
Chart (1977)	Peak position
U.S. Billboard Top Soul LPs	44

Singles

Year	Single	Peak chart positions	
Year	Single	US	US R&B
1969	"So I Can Love You"	39	3
1969	"The Best Part of a Love Affair"	—	27
