= Smile (The Emotions song) =

Single by The Emotions

from the album Sunbeam
- B-side: "Changes"
- Released: 1978
- Genre: Pop, R&B
- Length: 3:12
- Label: Columbia
- Songwriters: Maurice White, Al McKay
- Producer: Maurice White

The Emotions singles chronology
"Walking The Line" (1978)	"Smile" (1978)	"Whole Lot Of Shakin'" (1978)

Music video
- "Smile" on YouTube

"Smile" is a song recorded by R&B group the Emotions released as a single in 1978 on Columbia Records. The single reached No. 6 on the Billboard Hot Soul Songs chart.

== Overview ==
Smile was produced by Maurice White who also composed the song with Al McKay. The single's b-side was a song called Changes. Both Smile and Changes came from The Emotions 1978 studio album Sunbeam.

== Critical reception ==
Craig Lytle of Allmusic called the song an "aggressively paced number, from the simmering verses to the spellbinding change-up," which "bounces with effervescence." John Storm Roberts of High Fidelity also described Smile as a "tight, unfussy" tune.
