= Best of My Love (The Emotions song) =

1977 single by The Emotions

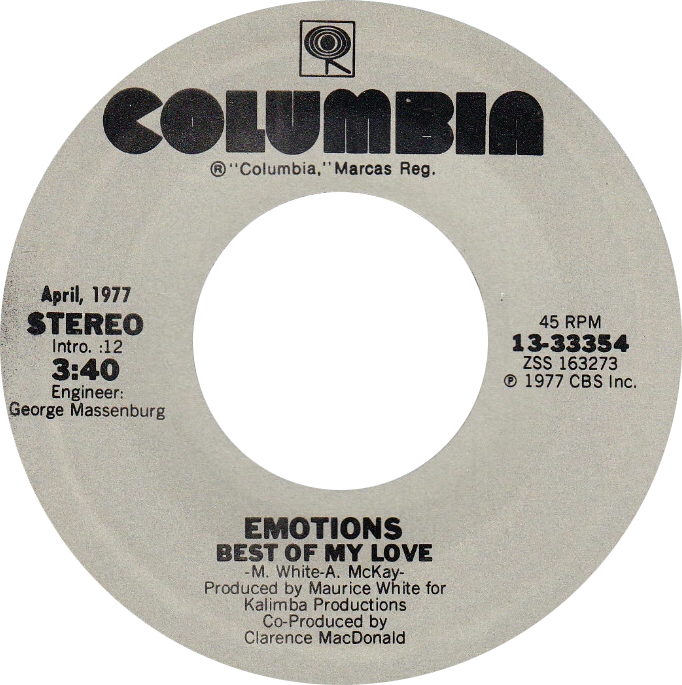
- One of US reissues

Single by the Emotions

from the album Rejoice
- B-side: "A Feeling Is"
- Released: June 9, 1977
- Genre: Disco; gospel; soul; funk
- Length: 3:42
- Label: Columbia
- Songwriters: Maurice White; Al McKay
- Producers: Maurice White; Clarence McDonald

The Emotions singles chronology
| "I Don't Wanna Lose Your Love" (1976) | "Best of My Love" (1977) | "Don't Ask My Neighbors" (1977) |

Music video
- "Best of My Love" on YouTube

"Best of My Love" is a song by American group The Emotions from their fourth studio album Rejoice (1977). Released as the album's lead single on June 9, 1977, the song topped both the US Billboard Hot 100 and US Billboard R&B charts. It also reached the top five in the UK and Canada, the top 10 in New Zealand and the top 20 in Australia.

"Best of My Love" won a Grammy Award for Best R&B Performance by a Duo or Group with Vocals at the 20th Annual Grammy Awards (1977). The song also won an American Music Award for Favorite Soul/R&B Single at the American Music Awards of 1978.

== Background ==
This tune was composed by Maurice White and Al McKay of Earth, Wind & Fire, also produced by White and Clarence McDonald.

"Best of My Love" was originally published in the key of C major in common time with a tempo of 120 beats per minute. The vocals span from C_{4} to A_{5} (although in the outro of the song, one of The Emotions hits a C_{6}).

== Commercial performance ==
The single achieved huge success, remaining on top of the US Billboard Hot 100 chart for five non-consecutive weeks. On the disco chart, "Best of My Love" peaked at number 11. The song was ranked at number 87 on "The Billboard Hot 100 All-Time Top Songs". As well this was 1977's third biggest pop hit and fifth biggest R&B hit. "Best of My Love" has been certified Platinum in the US by the RIAA and Gold in the UK by the BPI.

== Critical reception ==
Craig Lytle of AllMusic said of "Best of My Love", "This spirited cut is seasoned with a fierce arrangement, in particular the horns, and incomparable vocals". Robert Hilburn of the Los Angeles Times described the tune as "one of the year's most delightful singles".

Billboard ranked the song at number one on their 2015 list of the Top 40 Biggest Girl Group Songs of All Time on the Billboard Hot 100 chart. Billboard also ranked the track at number 10 on their 2017 list of 100 Greatest Girl Group Songs of All Time. In 2018, "Best of My Love" was ranked at number six on Heavy's list of Top 51 Best Love Songs: The Heavy Power List.

== Covers and samples ==
"Best of My Love" has been covered by Mary J. Blige, Ella Eyre, Sheena Easton, Unchain and Samantha Jade. It has been sampled by De La Soul, Lisa Lisa and Cult Jam, Girl Talk, Kylie Minogue, C+C Music Factory, Keyshia Cole, Mariah Carey, B-Rock and the Bizz and Tamia. The song was also sampled in Paul Russell's 2023 single, "Lil Boo Thang" from his EP Again Sometime?.

== Personnel ==
- Clarence McDonald – piano, clavinet
- Paulinho da Costa – percussion
- Al McKay – guitar
- Larry Dunn – synthesizer
- Verdine White – bass
- Fred White – drums
- Tom Tom 84 (Thomas Washington) – string and horn arrangements

== Charts ==
=== Weekly charts ===
Weekly chart performance for "Best of My Love"
| Chart (1977) | Peak position |
|---|---|
| Australia (Kent Music Report) | 17 |
| Belgium (Ultratop 50 Flanders) | 27 |
| Belgium (Ultratop 50 Wallonia) | 33 |
| Canada Top Singles (RPM) | 5 |
| Netherlands (Single Top 100) | 21 |
| New Zealand (Recorded Music NZ) | 9 |
| UK Singles Chart (Official Charts Company) | 4 |
| US Billboard Hot 100 | 1 |
| US Billboard Hot Soul Singles | 1 |
| US Billboard Hot Dance/Disco | 11 |
| US Cash Box Top 100 | 1 |

=== Year-end charts ===
Year-end chart performance for "Best of My Love"
| Chart (1977) | Rank |
|---|---|
| Brazil (ABPD) | 6 |
| Canada | 49 |
| UK | 40 |
| US Billboard Hot 100 | 3 |
| US Cash Box Top 100 | 13 |

=== All-time charts ===
All-time chart performance for "Best of My Love"
| Chart (1958–2018) | Position |
|---|---|
| US Billboard Hot 100 | 111 |

== Certifications ==
Certifications for "Best of My Love"
| Region | Certification | Certified units/sales |
|---|---|---|
| New Zealand (RMNZ) | Platinum | 30,000^{‡} |
| United Kingdom (BPI) Physical release | Silver | 250,000^{^} |
| United Kingdom (BPI) Digital release | Platinum | 600,000^{‡} |
| United States (RIAA) | Platinum | 1,000,000^{^} |
^{^} Shipments figures based on certification alone.^{‡} Sales+streaming figures based on certification alone.

== C. J. Lewis version ==
"Best of My Love"

Single by C. J. Lewis

from the album Dollars
- Released: September 26, 1994
- Recorded: 1994
- Genre: Reggae fusion
- Length: 3:47
- Label: Black Market International, MCA
- Songwriters: Maurice White, Al McKay
- Producers: C. J. Lewis, Phillip Leo

C. J. Lewis singles chronology
| "Uptight (Everything's Alright)" (1994) | "Best of My Love" (1994) | "Dollars" (1994) |

British reggae singer C. J. Lewis covered "Best of My Love" for his album Dollars and released it as a single on September 26, 1994. His version reached number 13 on the UK Singles Chart, and peaked at number 11 in New Zealand.

=== Track listings ===
7" Single

1. "Best Of My Love" (Phil's New Mix) 3:47
2. "Two Timer" (Album Version) 3:54

=== Charts ===
| Chart (1994) | Peak position |
|---|---|
| Belgium (Ultratop 50 Flanders) | 28 |
| New Zealand (Recorded Music NZ) | 11 |
| UK Singles (OCC) | 13 |
