= Can't Let Go (Earth, Wind & Fire song) =

Single by Earth, Wind & Fire

from the album I Am
- B-side: "Love Music"
- Released: 1979
- Recorded: 1978
- Genre: R&B, disco
- Length: 3:28
- Label: ARC/Columbia
- Songwriters: Bill Meyers; Maurice White; Allee Willis
- Producer: Maurice White

Earth, Wind & Fire singles chronology
"Star" (1979)	"Can't Let Go" (1979)	"Let Me Talk" (1980)

"Can't Let Go" is a single by R&B/funk band Earth, Wind & Fire released in 1979 on ARC/Columbia Records. The song peaked at No. 12 on the Blues & Soul Top British Soul Singles chart, No. 31 on the Dutch Pop Singles chart and No. 46 on the UK Pop Singles chart.

== Overview ==
"Can't Let Go" was produced by Maurice White and composed by Bill Meyers, Maurice White and Allee Willis. The song was released on the 1979 studio album I Am.

The single's B-side, "Love Music", was first released on the 1978 compilation album The Best of Earth, Wind & Fire, Vol. 1.

== Chart positions ==
Year	Chart	Peak position
1979	UK Singles Chart	46
1979	Dutch Singles Chart	31
1980	Blues & Soul Top British Soul Singles	12
