= Rejoice (The Emotions album) =

Studio album by the Emotions
- Released: June 10, 1977
- Recorded: 1976
- Studios: Sunset Sound, Hollywood, California; Wally Heider, Los Angeles, California; Hollywood Sound, Los Angeles, California
- Genres: Pop, disco, soul, R&B
- Length: 38:48
- Label: Columbia
- Producer: Maurice White

The Emotions chronology
Flowers (1976)	Rejoice (1977)	Sunshine (1977)

Singles from Rejoice
- 1. "Best of My Love" Released: June 9, 1977; 2. "Don't Ask My Neighbors" Released: 1977

Rejoice is an album by American vocal group the Emotions, released in June 1977 on Columbia Records. The album peaked at No. 1 on the US Billboard Top R&B Albums chart and at No. 7 on the US Billboard 200 chart. Rejoice has also been certified Platinum in the US by the RIAA. The album is also the only album to feature all four Hutchinson sisters (Jeanette, Wanda, Sheila, and Pamela).

== Overview ==
The album was produced by Earth, Wind & Fire leader Maurice White. When asked about his favorite non–Earth, Wind & Fire album, White replied: "The Emotions' Rejoice because it had a great vibe, a great ‘feel’. Yeah, I'm proud of that production." Rejoice spent seven weeks atop the Billboard Top R&B Albums chart.

== Critical reception ==
Professional ratings
Review scores
Source	Rating
AllMusic	4/5 stars
The Village Voice	C+
The Virgin Encyclopedia of R&B and Soul	3/5 stars

Ace Adams of the New York Daily News stated that the album "displays the growing talent of these rising stars." People said: "This LP offers no messages, pretensions or sexual innuendos but simple romantic themes by four sisters, Wanda, Sheila, Pamela and Jeanette Hutchinson. Their tight harmonies and polished chords make them logical successors to the original Supremes. Producer Maurice White of Earth, Wind and Fire (with whom the girls have toured) provides lush arrangements and joins lead singer Wanda in a smoothly worked Key to My Heart." Larry Rohter of The Washington Post wrote: "As much because of their material as the(ir) vocal style, the Emotions have been able to inject some life and excitement into a soul format that badly needed it." Phyl Garland of Stereo Review proclaimed: "Though there is nothing here that is truly new in terms of musical format or content, "Rejoice" demonstrates what can be done within the limits of popular style when talent and imagination are applied." Garland described the girl group's performance as "thrice nice" and called Rejoice a "very good" album. Robert Hilburn of the Los Angeles Times commented: "Produced by Earth, Wind & Fire's Maurice White, the album has material that is ideal for the female vocal trio's mostly light, upbeat style. The arrangements, too, are skillfully tailored. Not much adventure here, but solid craftsmanship. That ought to count for something these days."

Craig Lytle of AllMusic found that "the radiance the Emotions impart is heartwarming and uplifting... Their gospel roots bring a welcome spiritual feel to this album, which is a superb effort."

== Singles ==
The first single released, “Best of My Love,” reached number one on both the US Billboard Hot 100 and Hot Soul Songs charts. "Best of My Love" won a Grammy Award for Best R&B Performance By a Duo or Group with Vocals at the 20th Annual Grammy Awards and an American Music Award for Favorite Soul/R&B Single at the American Music Awards of 1978. "Best of My Love" was also certified Platinum in the US by the Recording Industry Association of America.

The second single "Don't Ask My Neighbors” reached No. 7 on the Billboard Hot Soul Singles chart.

== Track listing ==
Side one
No.	Title	Writer(s)	Length
1.	"Best of My Love"	Maurice White, Al McKay	3:40
2.	"A Feeling Is"	Sheila Hutchinson	3:36
3.	"A Long Way to Go"	Barry Mann, Cynthia Weil	3:48
4.	"Key to My Heart"	Verdine White, Robert Wright	5:21
5.	"Love's What's Happenin'"	Sheila Hutchinson	3:18

Side two
No.	Title	Writer(s)	Length
1.	"How'd I Know That Love Would Slip Away"	Deniece Williams, Clarence McDonald, Lani Groves	4:41
2.	"Don't Ask My Neighbors"	Skip Scarborough	4:26
3.	"Blessed"	Maurice White, Jerry Peters	4:36
4.	"Rejoice"	Wanda Hutchinson, Keith Henderson, LaFayette Evans	5:22

== Personnel ==
The Emotions

- Wanda Hutchinson – vocals
- Sheila Hutchinson – vocals
- Pamela Hutchinson – vocals
- Jeanette Hutchinson – vocals

Musicians

- Clarence McDonald – piano, clavinet
- Marlo Henderson (tracks 2–3, 6, 9), Al McKay (1, 4–5, 7–8) – guitar
- David Shields (tracks 2–3, 6, 9), Verdine White (1, 4–5, 7–8) – bass
- James Gadson (tracks 2–3, 6, 9), Fred White (1, 4–5, 7–8) – drums
- Paulinho DaCosta – percussion
- Larry Dunn – synthesizer (tracks 1, 5)
- Maurice White – drums (tracks 7–8), additional vocals (4)
- Jerry Peters (track 8), Skip Scarborough (7) – electric piano
- George Bohanon, Louis Satterfield, Lew McCreary, George Thatcher – trombones
- Oscar Brashear, Steve Madaio, Chuck Findley – trumpets
- Alan Robinson, Marilyn Robinson, Vincent DeRosa, Sidney Muldrow, Richard Perissi – French horns
- Don Myrick – saxophones, flute
- Charles Veal Jr. – concertmaster
- Israel Baker, Arnold Belnick, Janice Gower, Betty LaMagna, Dorothy Wade, Robert Sushel – violins
- Rollice Dale, Denyse Buffum, Paul Polivnick – violas
- Raymond Kelley, Selene Hurford, Dennis Karmazyn – cellos
- Dorothy Ashby – harp
- Tom Tom 84 (Thomas Washington) – horn and string arrangements

== Charts ==
Chart (1977)	Peak
Canada Top Albums/CDs (RPM)	29
U.S. Billboard Top LPs	7
U.S. Billboard Top Soul LPs	1

Singles

Year	Single	Peak chart positions			
Year	Single	US	US R&B	US Dan	UK
1977	"Best of My Love"	1	1	11	4
1977	"Don't Ask My Neighbors"	44	7	—	—

== See also ==
- List of Billboard number-one R&B albums of 1977
