= In the Stone =

Single by Earth, Wind & Fire

from the album I Am
- B-side: "You and I"
- Released: 1979
- Recorded: 1978
- Genre: Disco
- Length: 4:48
- Label: Columbia
- Songwriters: Allee Willis; David Foster; Maurice White
- Producer: Maurice White

Earth, Wind & Fire singles chronology
"After the Love Has Gone" (1979)	"In the Stone" (1979)	"Can't Let Go" (1979)

"In the Stone" is a song by R&B/funk band Earth, Wind & Fire issued as a single in 1979 on Columbia Records. The song rose to No. 23 on the Billboard Hot Soul Songs chart.

== Overview ==
"In the Stone" was produced by Maurice White, who composed the song with Allee Willis and David Foster. The single also came off Earth, Wind & Fire's 1979 album I Am.

== Background and composition ==
In an interview with Questlove Supreme, songwriter Allee Willis explained the story behind the song, saying: "The first thing Maurice (White) ever said to me was, 'What do you know about Eastern philosophies?' and I said I didn't know anything, so he gave me a list of books and sent me to a store in L.A. called The Bodhi Tree. He gave me 10 books and said, 'The one you have to start with is The Greatest Salesman in the World,' and I thought it's about advertising... I got this down, and I opened it up, and it's not about advertising. It's about the prophets, and they're in the old Egypt. I got so confused immediately.

"But 'In the Stone' was supposed to be the song that's got all their philosophy in there, so I never understood it as we were writing. He would basically tell me what he wanted to say, and I would give him 10 different lines that said that. Now, of course, I understand everything. It's very much about the fact that everything is pre-written; there's this mindset for what man is, and he very much believed in past lives and future lives. But that one, I was flying by the seat of my pants."

In Maurice White's autobiography, he explained: "One thing that I wanted Allee (Willis) and all the people who collaborated with me to understand is that non-conformity and curiosity always lead to a heightened creativity. The reason I wanted her to read certain books was twofold. One, it was not so much to hip her to this or that as just to expose her to different things, break her out of the norms of conventional thinking. Inhibitions kill imagination. Mysticism helps keep it alive. Secondly, I wanted to give her a language that would hip her to write lyrics in a philosophical manner, even so-called love songs. That language would really manifest itself in the song 'In the Stone.'"

About the songwriting process, Willis said: "I don't remember with that particular song that I was in the same room at the same time with David Foster. He started it with Maurice, then Maurice brought it to me, and we, like, finished it."

== Critical reception ==
Phyl Garland of Stereo Review wrote, "'In the Stone' is less imaginative than many of Earth, Wind & Fire's previous efforts, but performing gusto compensates for the slim substance." Ace Adams of the New York Daily News called "In the Stone" one of the album's "best songs." Cash Box said it was "an irresistible dancing cut" that "moves to a swinging mixture of catchy percussives and intricately woven harmonies." James Johnson of the Evening Standard proclaimed, "The slightly curious cosmic overtones of their lyrics remain in evidence on... 'In the Stone'."

== In popular culture ==
- This song was used as the opening theme for the Brazilian TV show Porta da Esperança (Door of Hope), produced by SBT.
- Very popular with school marching bands, especially after being featured in the movie Drumline (2002)
- This song was used on the theme song of Chilean music festival Viña del Mar International Song Festival in late 70's and 80's.

== Personnel ==
- Writing, lyrics – Allee Willis, David Foster, Maurice White
- Producer – Maurice White

Production

- Horn arrangement – Jerry Hey
- String arrangement – David Foster
- Programmer – Steve Porcaro

Engineers

- Engineer – George Massenburg, Tom Perry
- Mixing engineer – George Massenburg
- Assistant engineer – Craig Widby, Ross Pallone

Performers

- Saxophone – Fred Jackson Jr., Herman Riley, Jerome Richardson
- Alto saxophone, baritone saxophone – Don Myrick
- Tenor saxophone – Andrew Woolfolk, Don Myrick
- Bass – Meyer Rubin, Susan Ranney, Verdine White
- Drums – Fred White, Maurice White
- Guitar – Al McKay, Johnny Graham, Marlo Henderson, Steve Lukather
- Congas – Philip Bailey
- Keyboards – Bill Myers, David Foster, Eddie Del Barrio
- Percussion – Maurice White, Paulinho Da Costa, Philip Bailey, Ralph Johnson
- Piano, synthesizer – Larry Dunn
- Timpani – Richard Lepore
- French horn - Barbara Korn, Marilyn Robinson, Richard Perissi, Sidney Muldrow
- Trombone – Benjamin Powell, Garnett Brown, George Bohanon, Louis Satterfield, Maurice Spears, William Reichenbach
- Trumpet - Bobby Bryant, Elmer Brown Jr., Jerry Hey, Michael Harris, Oscar Brashear, Rahmlee Michael Davis, Steve Madaio
- Viola - Barbara Thomason, Linda Lipsett, Norman Forrest, Renita Koven
- Violin - Barry Socher, Betty Lamagna, Carl LaMagna, David Stockhammer, Haim Shtrum, Harris Goldman, Jack Gootkin, Lya Stern, Marcia Van Dyke, Mary D. Lundquist, Ronald Clark, Ruth Henry, Sheldon Sanov
- Cello – Daniel Smith, Jan Kelley, Ronald Cooper, Concert Master, Janice Gower
- Harp – Dorothy Jeanne Ashby
- Vocal - Maurice White, Philip Bailey
- Background Vocal – Maurice White, Philip Bailey

== Chart positions ==
Chart (1979—1980)	Peak position
UK singles chart	53
US Billboard Hot 100	58
US Billboard Hot Soul Singles	23
New Zealand RIANZ Top Singles	39
