= If I Only Knew (album) =

Studio album by The Emotions
- Released: January 27, 1985
- Recorded: 20 August–28 November 1984
- Studio: Ritesonian Recording Studios, Van Nuys, California; Hollywood Sound Studios, Hollywood, California
- Genre: R&B, soul
- Label: Motown
- Producer: Billy Osborne, Zane Giles

The Emotions chronology
Sincerely (1983)	If I Only Knew (1985)

If I Only Knew is the eighth studio album of American girl group the Emotions, released in 1985 by Motown Records. The album reached No. 11 on the UK Blues & Soul Hiplist chart.

== Critical reception ==
Professional ratings
Review scores
Source	Rating
AllMusic	3/5 stars
Blues & Soul	8/10
The Philadelphia Inquirer	3/4 stars

AllMusic gave the album a three out of five star rating. With an 8/10 review Blues & Soul found "the album is the kind of statement as to what they've done before and where they're heading off to. The Good Times and Eternally are the kind of classy ballads we've come to expect from the trio while Supernatural dabbles in pop funk and Miss Your Love hits a rock blues vein". Jack Lloyd of The Philadelphia Inquirer in a 3/4 stars review wrote, "Motown-influenced girl groups certainly aren't as hot as they were in the 1960s, but this veteran trio is carrying on the tradition nicely, maintaining the basic sound while updating the production. Lloyd added "the Emotions shift nicely between such soulful, upbeat numbers as "Miss Your Love" and more sophisticated numbers such as "Good Times."

== Track listing ==
No.	Title	Writer(s)	Length
1.	"Supernatural"	Crystal Wilson, Edwin Blackmon, Jamie Parrish, Kenny Pickens, Wanda Vaughn	4:28
2.	"The Good Times"	Billy Osborne, Attala Zane Giles	4:21
3.	"Miss Your Love"	Jack Philpot, Wanda Vaughn	5:05
4.	"If I Only Knew (What I Know Now)"	Jon Lind, Larry John McNally	4:27
5.	"Just A Girl In Love"	Artis Phillips, Bob Staley, Joshua Weaver	4:22
6.	"Shine Your Love On Me"	Wanda Vaughn	5:48
7.	"Giving You All I Got"	Billy Osborne, Attala Zane Giles	4:21
8.	"Closer To You"	David Cochrane, Deborah Thomas	4:08
9.	"Eternally"	Billy Osborne, Attala Zane Giles	4:43

== Charts ==
Chart (1985)	Peak position
US Top R&B/Hip-Hop Albums (Billboard)	54
