= Flowers (The Emotions song) =

1976 song by The Emotions

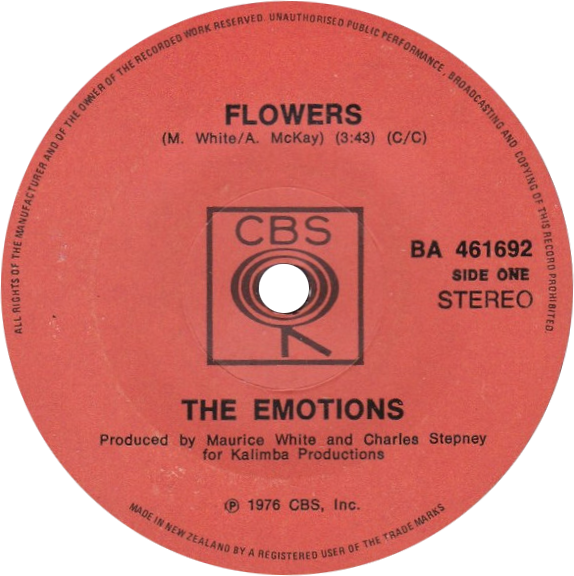
- Side one of the New Zealand single

Single by The Emotions

from the album Flowers
- B-side: "I Don't Wanna Lose Your Love"
- Released: May 1976
- Genre: Pop, R&B
- Length: 3:43
- Label: Columbia
- Songwriters: Maurice White, Al McKay
- Producers: Maurice White, Charles Stepney

The Emotions singles chronology
"Flowers" (1976)	"I Don't Wanna Lose Your Love" (1976)

"Flowers" is a song recorded by R&B group the Emotions, and the title track to their 1976 album. It was released as a single in May 1976 by Columbia Records. The single reached No. 16 on the US Billboard Hot Soul Singles chart and No. 2 on the NZ Top 40 Singles chart.

== Overview ==
"Flowers" was produced by EWF bandleader Maurice White and Charles Stepney. The track was composed by White with Al McKay.

== Critical reception ==
AllMusic described "Flowers" as a song which "smoothes the mood with the girl's sweet R&B vocals.

== Charts ==
Chart (1976)	Peak position
NZ Top 40 Singles	2
U.S. Billboard Hot 100	87
U.S. Hot Soul Singles (Billboard)	16

== Certifications ==
Certifications for "Flowers "
Region	Certification	Certified units/sales
New Zealand (RMNZ)	Gold	15,000^{‡}
^{‡} Sales+streaming figures based on certification alone.
