= You're the One (The Emotions song) =

1984 single by The Emotions

Single by The Emotions

from the album Sincerely
- Released: 1984
- Genre: Pop, R&B
- Label: Red Label
- Songwriter(s): Billy Osborne, Zane Giles
- Producer(s): Billy Osborne, Zane Giles

The Emotions singles chronology
| "Turn It Out" (1981) | "You're the One" (1984) | "You're the Best" (1984) |

"You're the One" is a song recorded by R&B group the Emotions released as a single in 1984 on Red Label Records. The single reached No. 34 on the Billboard Hot Soul Songs chart and No. 11 on the UK Physical Singles chart.

== Background ==
"You're the One" was composed and produced by Billy Osborne and Zane Giles. The song came from the Emotions 1984 studio album "Sincerely".

== Critical reception ==
Hugh Wyatt of the New York Daily News wrote "The Emotions are a threesome, but their sound at times resembles a full choir, particularly on such cuts as the title tune and "You're the One"."
