= Heart Association =

1970 song by The Emotions

Single by The Emotions
- B-side: "The Touch of Your Lips"
- Released: 1970
- Genre: Soul; R&B
- Length: 3:01
- Label: Volt
- Songwriter(s): Vince Willis
- Producer(s): David Porter; Ronnie Williams

The Emotions singles chronology
"When Tomorrow Comes" (1969)	"Heart Association" (1970)	"Black Christmas" (1970)

"Heart Association" is a song by R&B group The Emotions released as a single in 1970 on Stax Records. The single reached No. 29 on the Billboard Hot R&B Singles chart.

== Overview ==
"Heart Association" was produced by David Porter and Ronnie Williams. The song was written by Vince Willis.
