= Boogie Wonderland =

1979 single by Earth, Wind & Fire

Single by Earth, Wind & Fire with the Emotions

from the album I Am
- B-side: "Boogie Wonderland (Instrumental)"
- Released: April 24, 1979
- Recorded: 1978
- Genre: Disco; funk
- Length: 4:49 (LP/7"); 8:15 (12")
- Label: ARC; Columbia
- Songwriters: Allee Willis; Jon Lind
- Producers: Maurice White; Al McKay

Earth, Wind & Fire singles chronology
"September" (1978)	"Boogie Wonderland" (1979)	"After the Love Has Gone" (1979)

The Emotions singles chronology
"Walking the Line" (1979)	"Boogie Wonderland" (1979)	"What's the Name of Your Love?" (1979)

Music video
- "Boogie Wonderland" on YouTube

"Boogie Wonderland" is a song by American band Earth, Wind & Fire with the Emotions, released in April 1979 on Columbia Records as the first single from their ninth album, I Am (1979). The song peaked at number 14 on the US Billboard dance chart, number six on the Hot 100, and number two on Billboard Hot Soul Singles. It was certified gold in the US and platinum in the UK. "Boogie Wonderland" was Grammy-nominated for Best R&B Instrumental Performance and Best Disco Recording; it won the Grammy for Best R&B Instrumental Performance.

== Overview ==
The song was composed by Allee Willis with Jon Lind and produced by EWF leader Maurice White and Al McKay.

Willis wrote the lyrics in response to seeing the 1977 crime drama film Looking for Mr. Goodbar, where Rosanne Quinn, a murdered schoolteacher, tries to paper over her pain and feelings of insecurity with alcohol, drugs, and sex. “Boogie wonderland" described in the song is a magical place, but the lyrics also focus on the dreary reality from which discos provided an escape. The song creates a general vibe of escapism and begins with the unpleasant aftermath of a night out that made life better, but for only for a few hours.

== Critical reception ==
Rose Riggins of Gannett wrote "Boogie Wonderland is the hit. But it is more than just an average pop song. The song is an exploration of times spent at house parties and at discos, when you wanted to be disco queen or king and the spotlight just wouldn't focus on you. You wonder why and look into the mirror and it says, Uh, Uh, baby it don't work you dance to shake the hurt. Like so many of EWFs hits, Boogie Wonderland, is bolstered by the blazing horns that have become the groups trademark. Teamed up with the talented vocal group the Emotions, EWF has created a song that will join the ranks of such past hits as Mighty Mighty, Getaway, Fantasy and September." Dave Marsh of Rolling Stone said Maurice White "takes simple dance formulas like 'Boogie Wonderland' and finds fresh possibilities within them."

James Johnson of the Evening Standard called it a song "couched in a more down-to-earth, dance-floor dialogue." Matthew Greenwald of AllMusic stated: "one of the few records that paired two full-fledged groups successfully, the combination of EWF and the Emotions worked wonders here and it remains a classic of the period." Allen Weiner of Morning Call wrote: "Boogie Wonderland is the LP's most commercial tune, a tribute to both jazz/soul and disco fans that is pulsating and pleasing." Ace Adams of the New York Daily News also found that "The Emotions' Boogie Wonderland gets Earth, Wind & Fire off to a flying start on this album". Cash Box called it a "a standout pop dance track," saying that "sharp, slamming horn intro segues into bright backup singing by the Emotions, blending in perfectly with E, W & F leader Maurice White's vocal."

== Accolades ==
Publication	Country	Accolade	Year	Rank
Gary Mulholland	UK	This Is Uncool: The 500 Greatest Singles Since Punk and Disco	2002	*
Dave Marsh	U.S.	The 1001 Greatest Singles Ever Made	1989	737
Bruce Pollock	U.S.	The 7,500 Most Important Songs of 1944-2000	2005	*
The Guardian	UK	1,000 Songs Everyone Must Hear	2009	*

(*) designates lists that are unordered.

== Personnel ==
- Maurice White – lead and background vocals, drums, kalimba
- Philip Bailey – background vocals, congas, percussion
- Verdine White – bass (Yamaha BB2000)
- Ralph Johnson – percussion
- Al McKay & Marlo Henderson – guitar
- Larry Dunn – Piano & Oberheim and Moog Synthesizers
- Fred White – drums
- Don Myrick – alto, tenor, and baritone Saxophones
- The Emotions (Wanda Hutchinson, Jeanette Hutchinson, Sheila Hutchinson) – backing vocals
- Daniel Smith, Delores Bing, Jacqueline Lustgarten, Jan Kelley, John Walz, Kevan Torfeh, Larry Corbett, Miguel Martinez – cello
- Barbara Korn, Sidney Muldrow, Richard Perissi, Marilyn Robinson – french horn
- George Bohanon, Garnett Brown, Bill Reichenbach Jr., Louis Satterfield, Benjamin Powell, Maurice Spears – trombone
- Johnny Graham – guitar
- Fred Jackson, Jr., Herman Riley, Jerome Richardson – Additional Saxophones
- Richard Lepore – Timpani
- Oscar Brashear, Bobby Bryant, Michael Harris, Jerry Hey, Elmer Brown, Rahmlee Michael Davis, Steve Madaio – trumpets
- James Ross, Laurie Woods, Linda Lipsett, Marilyn Baker, Rollice Dale, Virginia Majewski – viola
- Anton Sen, Sherman Bryana, Carl LaMagna, Cynthia Kovaks, Gina Kronstadt, Haim Shtrum, Harris Goldman, Henry Ferber, Henry Roth, Ilkka Talvi, Jack Gootkin, Jerome Reisler, Jerome Webster, Joseph Goodman, Joseph Livoti, Judith Talvi, Leeana Sherman, Marcy Dicterow, Pamela Gates, Pavel Farkas, Ronald Clarck, Rosmen Torfeh, Sheldon Sanov, William Henderson – violin
- Steve Poskitt – step in drummer for Boogie Wonderland recording

== Charts ==
=== Weekly charts ===
Chart (1979)	Peak position
Australia (Kent Music Report)	5
Belgium (Ultratop 50 Flanders)	4
Canada	11
Finland (Suomen virallinen lista)	10
France (IFOP)	2
Ireland (IRMA)	5
Netherlands (Dutch Top 40)	4
Netherlands (Single Top 100)	4
New Zealand (Recorded Music NZ)	7
Norway (VG-lista)	2
South Africa (Springbok Radio)	17
Sweden (Sverigetopplistan)	7
UK Singles (OCC)	4
US Billboard Hot 100	6
US Hot Soul Singles (Billboard)	2
US Disco Top 80 (Billboard)	14
US Cash Box Top 100	5
West Germany (Official German Charts)	25

Chart (1993)	Peak position
Finland (Suomen virallinen singlelista)	4

Chart (2012)	Peak position
France	39

=== Year-end charts ===
Chart (1979)	Rank
Australia (Kent Music Report)	56
Canada Top Singles	114
New Zealand (Recorded Music NZ)	30
UK Singles (Music Week)	22
US Billboard Hot 100	57
US Cash Box Top 100	33

== Certifications ==
Region	Certification	Certified units/sales
Denmark (IFPI Danmark) Digital	Platinum	90,000^{‡}
Germany (BVMI)	Gold	300,000^{‡}
Italy (FIMI) Sales since 2009	Gold	35,000^{‡}
New Zealand (RMNZ)	2× Platinum	60,000^{‡}
Spain (Promusicae)	Gold	30,000^{‡}
United Kingdom (BPI) Physical	Gold	500,000^{^}
United Kingdom (BPI) Sales since 2015	Platinum	600,000^{‡}
United States (RIAA) Physical	Gold	1,000,000^{^}
^{^} Shipments figures based on certification alone.^{‡} Sales+streaming figures based on certification alone.

== Sampling ==
- "Boogie Wonderland" was the basis for the dance song "I'm Alive" by Stretch & Vern; the song reached number six in the UK in September 1996.
- "Boogie Wonderland" was sampled on the theme song of Chilean local program radio news Noticias a la hora from radio station from Puerto Montt Radio Reloncaví in early 1990s.
