= Untouched (album) =

Studio album by The Emotions
- Released: 1971
- Studio: Muscle Shoals Sound Studios; Universal Recording Studio; Stax Recording Studios
- Genre: R&B, soul
- Label: Volt
- Producer: Isaac Hayes, Ronnie Williams, David Porter

The Emotions chronology
So I Can Love You (1969)	Untouched (1971)	Flowers (1976)

Singles from Untouched
- 1. "If You Think It (You May As Well Do It)" Released: 1971; 2. "Show Me How" Released: 1971

Untouched is the second studio album of American girl group The Emotions released in 1971 by Stax Records.

== Overview ==
Untouched was produced by Isaac Hayes, Ronnie Williams and David Porter. Artists such as the Bar-Kays appeared on the album.

=== Singles ===
Two singles were released from the album: "If You Think It (You May as Well Do It)" and "Show Me How", which peaked at No. 13 on the Billboard Best-Selling Soul Singles chart.

== Critical reception ==
Professional ratings
Review scores
Source	Rating
AllMusic	3/5 stars
Billboard	(favourable)

Richie Unterberger of AllMusic wrote, "Jeanette Hutchinson was replaced by fellow Chicagoan Theresa Davis for the group's second album. But there was little change in the kind of sweet gospel-soul the trio sang--perhaps it was a shade poppier than the first LP, but barely."

== Track listing ==
No.	Title	Writer(s)	Length
1.	"Take Me Back"	William Hart	3:22
2.	"Nothing Seems Impossible"	Jeanette Hutchinson	3:05
3.	"Boss Love Maker"	Joe Hutchinson	3:22
4.	"It's Been Fun"	Jo. Hutchinson	3:02
5.	"Love Ain't Easy Onesided"	David Porter, Ronnie Williams	2:46
6.	"Blind Alley"	Porter	3:04
7.	"Show Me How"	Porter, Isaac Hayes	3:04
8.	"If You Think It (You May as Well Do It)"	Porter, Williams	2:59
9.	"Love Is the Hardest Thing to Find"	Porter, Hayes	2:43
10.	"Tricks Were Made for Kids"	Philip Mitchell	3:43
11.	"Boy, I Need You"	Sheila Hutchinson, Theresa Davis, Wanda Hutchinson	2:57
