= The Emotions =

American soul/R&B vocal group from Chicago, Illinois

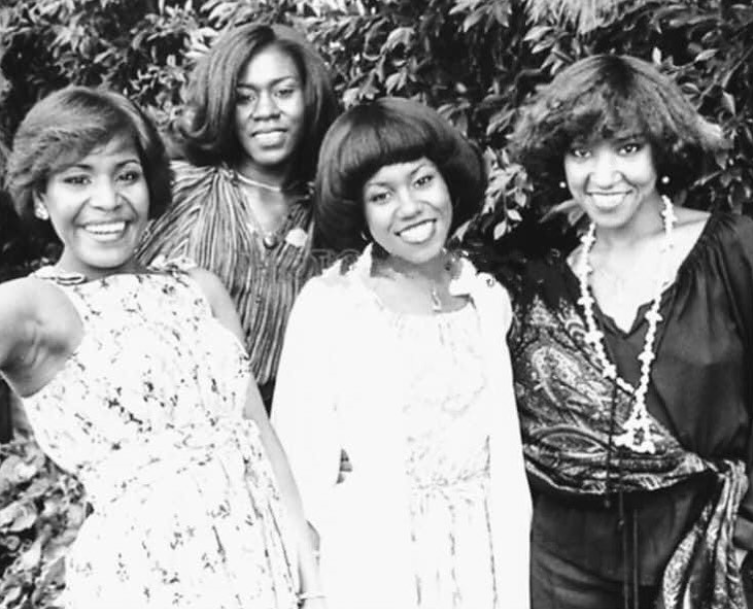
- The Emotions (Sheila, Jeanette, Pamela, and Wanda) in 1977

Background information
- Also known as: The Hutchinson Sunbeams
- Origin: Chicago, Illinois, U.S.
- Genres: R&B; soul; pop; disco; gospel
- Years active: 1957–present
- Labels: Stax; Volt; Columbia; ARC Records; Red Label; Motown
- Members: Wanda Hutchinson; Wyann Vaughn; Wendi Vaughn
- Past members: Sheila Hutchinson; Pamela Hutchinson; Jeanette Hutchinson; Theresa Davis; Adrianne Harris; Crystal Wilson

The Emotions are an American female vocal group from Chicago, Illinois, who achieved mainstream success during the 1970s. The original lineup comprised sisters Wanda Hutchinson, Sheila Hutchinson, and Jeanette Hutchinson. The group debuted on Volt Records with the release of their top-ten R&B single "So I Can Love You" in 1968. Following the decline of Volt Records and its parent company, Stax Records, the group transitioned to Columbia Records in 1975.

During the mid-1970s, the Emotions achieved mainstream success with Wanda and Sheila as lead singers and Maurice White as their production team. The group achieved their first gold-selling album with Flowers in 1976. The following year, they released their album Rejoice to platinum-selling success. The album's single, "Best of My Love", peaked atop the Billboard Hot 100 and earned them a Grammy Award for Best R&B Vocal Performance by a Duo, Group, or Chorus.

Throughout the group's history, the lineup continued to change with later members Theresa Davis, Pamela Hutchinson, and Adrianne Harris. VH1 listed the group as one of the 18 Most Influential Girl Groups of All Time. Their single "Best of My Love" was listed atop Billboard's Most Successful Girl Group Songs of All-Time list.

== History ==
=== 1957–1968: Early beginnings and The Hutchinson Sunbeams ===
The group originally formed as the Hutchinson Sunbeams in 1957, comprising Joe Hutchinson and his daughters Sheila Hutchinson, Wanda Hutchinson, and Jeanette Hutchinson. Based in Chicago, Illinois, they performed gospel songs at local churches and eventually became the opening act for American singer Mahalia Jackson. In 1958, they made their first televised appearance, on The Jerry Van Dyke Show. Over the early years of their career, The Hutchinson Sunbeams went through several name changes, becoming The Sunbeams, The Heavenly Sunbeams, Hutch Stereo's, and Three Ribbons and a Beau.

After graduating from Parker High School, the group moved forward as a trio with their father instead managing the group. While performing in a talent contest at the Regal Theatre in Chicago in 1968, the group secured a recording deal with Stax Records, although some reports state that Pervis Staples brought the group to Stax Records. Upon signing with Stax's subsidiary label Volt Records, the group adopted the name The Emotions.

=== 1969–1974: Career breakthrough and lineup changes ===
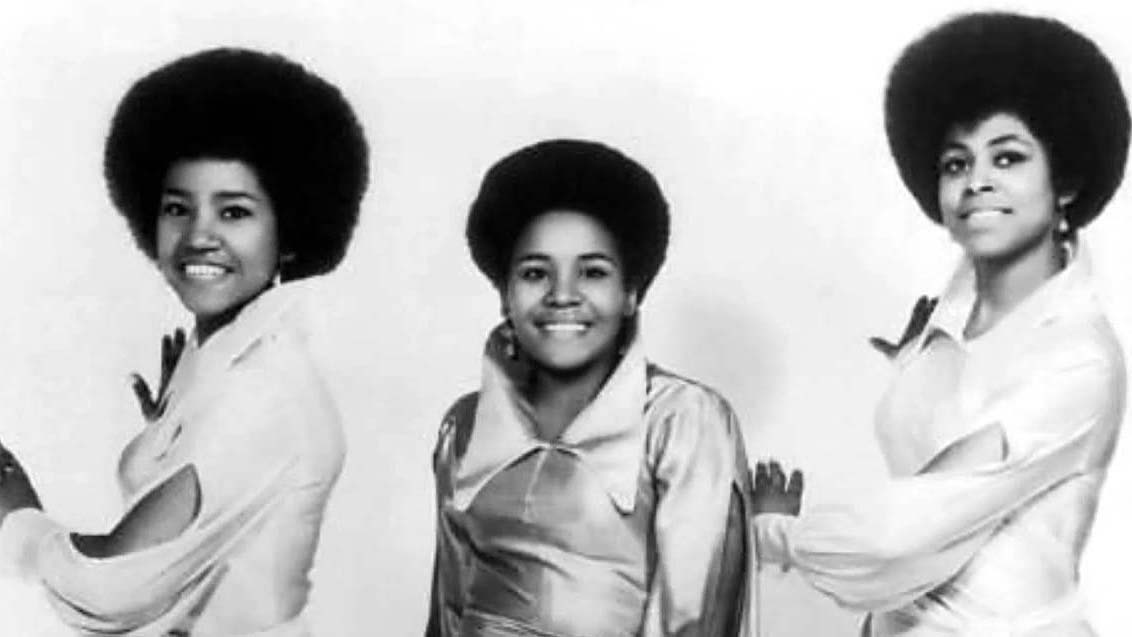
Theresa Davis (right) joined the group in 1970 as replacement for Jeanette.

In 1969, The Emotions released their debut album titled So I Can Love You on Stax, which peaked at number 43 on the Billboard Hot R&B LP's chart. The album's lead single and title-track "So I Can Love You," written by Sheila, was their first major hit, peaking at number 30 on the US Billboard Hot 100 chart and number 3 on the Best Selling Soul Singles chart. The album's second single, "The Best Part of a Love Affair," achieved moderate success by peaking at number 27 on the Best Selling Soul Singles chart. The group began releasing non-album singles: "Stealing Love", "When Tomorrow Comes," and "Heart Association," all of which peaked in the Top 40 on the Best Selling Soul Singles chart. In 1970, Jeanette departed from the group to focus on her marriage and family. She was replaced by her friend Theresa Davis. In 1971, The Emotions released their second album, Untouched. The album's single, "Show Me How", became another successful hit, peaking at number 56 on the Billboard Hot 100 chart and number 13 on the Soul Singles chart. In 1972, they released more singles: "My Honey and Me", "I Could Never Be Happy", and "From Toys to Boys"; all of which peaked in the Top 40 of the Soul Singles chart.

The Emotions perform the gospel song "Peace Be Still" from the pulpit of the Friendly Will Baptist Church in Watts in a sequence shot several weeks after the Wattstax concert in 1973. The group recorded an album titled Songs of Innocence and Experience to be released in 1973, but the album was shelved when Stax Records became financially unstable. Despite this, they continued to release more singles in 1973, including "Runnin' Back (and Forth)", "Peace Be Still", and "What Do the Lonely Do at Christmas". In 1974, they found minor success with the release of the single "Put a Little Love Away", which peaked at number 73 on the US Billboard Hot 100 and number 53 on the Hot Soul Singles chart. By 1975, Stax Records became defunct, and the Emotions briefly disbanded.

=== 1975–1982: Columbia Records and subsequent releases ===
Through an association with Earth, Wind & Fire's Maurice White, the group signed with Columbia Records in November 1975. White worked with the group on their third album, Flowers, which saw the return of Jeanette and was released in June 1976. Flowers marked their first entry on the Billboard 200, peaking at number 45, and their first time charting within the top ten of Soul LP's chart, peaking at number 5. While the album's lead single and title-track "Flowers" became a minor hit in the United States, it became a popular hit in New Zealand, peaking at number two on the New Zealand Top 40 Singles chart and earning a gold certification by the Recording Industry Association of New Zealand (RIANZ). The album's second single, "I Don't Wanna Lose Your Love", peaked at number 13 on the Hot Soul Singles chart and number 4 on the Hot Dance/Disco Club Play chart, marking their first entry on the chart. By January 1977, the album Flowers earned a gold certification by the Recording Industry Association of America (RIAA), selling over 500,000 copies within the United States. In the same year, Jeanette withdrew from public performances with the group, only appearing on the recording of their albums. Her role was filled by her younger sister, Pamela Hutchinson, for concert tours and televised performances.

Wanting to capitalize off of their success, The Emotions began working with Maurice White again on their fourth album, titled Rejoice. Released in June 1977, Rejoice, peaked at number seven on the Billboard 200 and atop of the Soul LP's chart. The album's lead single, "Best of My Love", became their first song to peak at number one on the Billboard Hot 100 and Hot Soul Singles chart. "Best of My Love" was certified platinum by the RIAA. The song also earned a Grammy Award for Best R&B Vocal Performance By A Duo, Group, or Chorus at the 20th Annual Grammy Awards in 1978. "Don't Ask My Neighbors" was issued as the second single and also became successful, peaking at number seven on the Hot Soul Singles chart. In November 1977, Fantasy Records (using the newly-acquired Stax Records name imprint) released Sunshine, a compilation album of previously recorded songs and singles during The Emotions' duration on Stax/Volt Records. The album spawned a single titled "Shouting Out Love" which reached number 31 on the Hot Soul Singles chart.

In April 1978, The Emotions released their fifth album Sunbeam, which rose to number 12 on the Top Soul Albums chart and number 40 on the Billboard 200 chart. The album received gold certication in the US by the RIAA. "Smile", the album's lead single, reached number six on the Hot Soul Songs chart. Continuing their music relationship with Maurice White, the group collaborated with Earth, Wind & Fire on the song "Boogie Wonderland". The song became their second top-ten international hit, and was certified gold in the US by the RIAA and platinum in the United Kingdom by the British Phonographic Industry (BPI). "Boogie Wonderland" received a nomination for Best Disco Recording at the 22nd Annual Grammy Awards in 1980. Hoping to capitalize off of the success of "Boogie Wonderland," the group wanted to include the song on their sixth studio album, Come into Our World, released in October 1979 on Maurice White's ARC Records, a subsidiary of Columbia Records. "Boogie Wonderland," however, was not included on their album, and The Emotions later filed a lawsuit against the group for unpaid royalties. The album, Come into Our World, was not a commercial success and failed to produce any major hits as the single "What's the Name of Your Love?" stalled at number 30 on the Hot R&B Songs chart. The group recorded another album called New Affair, released in 1981 on ARC Records. With the ARC label defunct in 1981 and the decline in disco music, the group's mainstream success began to fade. By 1982, the group was released from Columbia Records.

=== 1983–1990: Label changes ===
In 1983, Wanda and Jeanette went on to appear on Jennifer Holliday's album Feel My Soul, while Wanda and Pamela were featured on Earth, Wind & Fire's album Electric Universe. In 1984, The Emotions reformed with the lineup of Wanda, Sheila, and Pamela. They released their eighth studio album titled Sincerely, on behalf of the newly formed Chicago-based Red Label Records. Although the album peaked higher than its two predecessors on the Top R&B Albums chart (then called the Top Black Albums chart), it produced minor charting singles: "You're the One", "You're the Best", and "Are You Through with My Heart?".

In 1985, Pamela departed from The Emotions as the group signed with Motown Records. She was replaced by Adrianne Harris, and The Emotions released their ninth studio album, If I Only Knew, in January 1985. Their contract with Motown was short-lived when the album produced no charting singles. The Emotions went on to perform background vocals on Tyler Collins' "Whatcha Gonna Do" for her album Girls Nite Out (1989). Jeanette and Wanda performed background vocals on Earth, Wind & Fire's album Heritage (1990). In the same year, The Emotions also performed background vocals on Nancy Wilson's album A Lady with a Song (1990).

=== 1996–1997: Bigger than Bubblegum ===
In 1996, The Emotions (Wanda, Sheila, and Jeanette) released a live album titled Live In '96 on their own record label, Sunbeam Records. In May 1997, the group starred in the stage production titled Bigger than Bubblegum, a musical based on the lives of The Emotions. Bigger than Bubblegum opened at the Pasadena Playhouse in Pasadena, California on May 18, 1997.

=== 1998–present: Recent activities ===
In 1998, they featured on an episode of Motown Live with fellow girl group Divine and made a guest appearance on Smokey Robinson's album Intimate (1999). In 2000, Pamela rejoined the group as Jeanette departed. The Emotions went on to guest on Earth, Wind & Fire's 2003 album The Promise, which was produced by Maurice White. A song from the album featuring The Emotions called "All in the Way" rose to No. 13 on the Billboard Adult R&B Songs chart and No. 25 on the Billboard Adult Contemporary Songs chart. As well, the group appeared on a 2004 PBS soul music special hosted by Patti LaBelle, where they performed "Best of My Love". Within September of that year, Songs of Innocence and Experience was released by Stax Records. The Emotions went on to collaborate with rapper Snoop Dogg on a track called "Life" for his album Tha Blue Carpet Treatment (2006).

In 2009, Sheila departed from the group, and Wanda's daughter Wyann Vaughn was added to the lineup. In 2014, Wanda, Sheila, Pamela, and Theresa appeared in a featured episode of the music documentary program Unsung; chronicling the group's history of success and hardships. In July 2016, Jeanette (now known as Jeanette Marie Hawes) released her first solo album, No Regrets. On September 18, 2020, Pamela Hutchinson died at the age of 61 after battling to health challenges for several years. Following Pamela's death, Wanda's daughter Wendi Vaughn was added to the lineup. In 2022, Crystal Wilson (mother of singer Shanice) was briefly added to the lineup, replacing Wendi Vaughn until 2024.

== Legacy ==
The Emotions have sold more than 5 million records worldwide. The Emotions were named by VH1 as one of the 18 Most Influential Girl Groups of All Time. The Emotions won a Grammy Award for Best R&B Vocal Performance by a Duo, Group or Chorus in 1978 and were nominated for Best Disco Recording in 1980. They were also nominated twice at the American Music Awards, winning the American Music Award for Favorite Soul/R&B Song for "Best of My Love" in 1978 and then receiving a nomination for Favorite Soul/R&B Band/Duo/Group in 1979. On November 8, 2001, they became the honorary recipient of the Pioneer Award by the Rhythm and Blues Foundation. In March 2015, "Best of My Love" was listed atop Billboard's Most Successful Girl Group Songs of All-Time list. In 2025, Billboard ranked the single "Best of My Love" at number 9 on their list of Top 50 Love Songs of All Time. On September 4, 2025, The Emotions were presented with the Lifetime Achievement Award by Project Love Chicago.

The Emotions has been cited as a musical influence or source of inspiration by numerous musical acts, such as En Vogue, Destiny's Child, Anita Baker, Shanice, Regina Belle, Lalah Hathaway, Jade, Erykah Badu, Kirk Whalum, Sheena Easton, Teena Marie and Fantasia. The Emotions have been sampled by rappers such as Big Daddy Kane, Tupac Shakur, LL Cool J, Wu Tang Clan, 50 Cent, Ice Cube, Salt-N-Pepa, De La Soul, Kanye West, A Tribe Called Quest and The Notorious B.I.G. Artists such as Toni Braxton, 112, Mariah Carey, Lisa Lisa and Cult Jam, Mary J. Blige, Ginuwine, Keyshia Cole, Tamia, and Janet Jackson have also sampled the girl group.

== Members ==
Current members

- Wanda Hutchinson (1957–present)
- Wyann Vaughn (2009–present)
- Wendi Vaughn (2019–2022, 2025–present)

Former members

- Sheila Hutchinson (1957–2009)
- Jeanette Hutchinson (1957–1970, 1976–1982, 1996–2000)
- Pamela Hutchinson (1976–1985, 2000–2019; died 2020)
- Theresa Davis (1970–1974)
- Adrianne Harris (1985–1987)
- Crystal Wilson (2022–2024)

== Discography ==
- So I Can Love You (1969)
- Untouched (1971)
- Flowers (1976)
- Rejoice (1977)
- Sunbeam (1978)
- Come into Our World (1979)
- New Affair (1981)
- Sincerely (1984)
- If I Only Knew (1985)

== Accolades ==
=== American Music Awards ===
Year	Nominated work	Category	Result
1978	"Best of My Love"	Favorite Soul/R&B Song	Won
1979	—	Favorite Soul/R&B Band/Duo/Group	Nominated

=== Grammy Awards ===
Year	Nominated work	Category	Result	Ref
1978	"Best of My Love"	Best R&B Vocal Performance By A Duo, Group or Chorus	Won	
1980	"Boogie Wonderland"	Best Disco Recording	Nominated	

=== Honorary Awards ===
Year	Organization	Award
2001	Rhythm & Blues Foundation	Pioneer Award
2025	Project Love Chicago	Lifetime Achievement
