= Allee Willis =

American songwriter (1947–2019)

- Born: Alta Sherral Willis; November 10, 1947; Detroit, Michigan, U.S.
- Died: December 24, 2019 (aged 72) Los Angeles, California, U.S.
- Occupations: Songwriter; art director
- Partner: Prudence Fenton
- Website: alleewillis.com

Alta Sherral "Allee" Willis (November 10, 1947 – December 24, 2019) was an American songwriter and art director. Willis co-wrote hit songs including "September" and "Boogie Wonderland" by Earth, Wind & Fire and "What Have I Done to Deserve This?" by Pet Shop Boys featuring Dusty Springfield. She won two Grammy Awards for Beverly Hills Cop and The Color Purple, the latter of which was also nominated for a Tony Award. She was also nominated for an Emmy Award for "I'll Be There for You", which was used as the theme song for the sitcom Friends. Her compositions sold over 60 million records and she was inducted into the Songwriters Hall of Fame in 2018. In June 2024, Willis was also inducted posthumously into the Women Songwriters Hall of Fame.

== Early life ==
Willis was born and grew up in Detroit, Michigan, where she attended Mumford High School. Her parents were Jewish. Her father, Nathan, was a scrapyard dealer. Her mother, Rose, an elementary school teacher, died suddenly while Willis was a teenager. Willis had a sister, Marlen Frost, and a brother, Kent Willis.

Willis's love of black music and culture developed early. As a teenager, Willis said she liked to hang out outside Motown Records to listen to the music coming through the walls.

She attended the University of Wisconsin-Madison as a journalism major, was a member of the Sigma Delta Tau sorority and later became an activist, "marching and demonstrating" during the 60s. After college, she moved to New York City in 1969 and worked as a secretary at Columbia Records as a copywriter, writing liner notes and advertising material, before turning to songwriting and performing.

== Career ==
Willis' sole album, Childstar, in 1974, did not sell well, and she subsequently stopped performing. The album attracted the interest of Bonnie Raitt, who became the first musician to record one of Willis' songs. After moving to Los Angeles, Willis worked as a songwriter at A&M Records from 1977, and also wrote songs with, and for, Patti LaBelle and Herbie Hancock.

She worked at a comedy club and hung posters for four years. A mutual friend introduced her to Verdine White, and in turn to Maurice White of Earth, Wind & Fire. In the late 1970s she worked with Maurice White on the lyrics for her first big hit, "September", among other songs, and then co-wrote "Boogie Wonderland" with Jon Lind and "In the Stone" with Maurice White and David Foster.

Willis also wrote songs for artists including Debby Boone, Rita Coolidge, Crystal Gayle, Sister Sledge, Jennifer Holliday, Gladys Knight & the Pips, Cyndi Lauper, Crystal Waters, and Taylor Dayne. Songs she co-composed for other artists that became hits include "Lead Me On" by Maxine Nightingale, "Neutron Dance" by the Pointer Sisters, "What Have I Done to Deserve This?" by Pet Shop Boys featuring Dusty Springfield, and "I'll Be There for You" by The Rembrandts. "I'll Be There for You" was used as the theme song of the sitcom Friends and went on to become one of the most popular television theme songs up to that point. Willis jokingly referred to this song as "the whitest song I ever wrote". In 1994 Willis was Emmy-nominated for "I'll Be There for You".

In the 1980s, after starting to paint and make motorized sculptures, she became an art director for music videos, and worked on videos for such musicians as Debbie Harry and The Cars. In 1997, she addressed a U.S. House of Representatives subcommittee, to make the case for the property rights of BMI songwriters. She gave a keynote address at the first Digital World conference in 1992 and lectured on interactive journalism and on self-expression in cyberspace. She also co-wrote the Tony-nominated and Grammy-winning Broadway musical The Color Purple, first performed in 2005. The movie based on the musical was released in 2023.

Willis continued to work as an art director and set designer, and in 2008 won awards for her work with musician Holly Palmer on the music video artwork Allee Willis Presents Bubbles & Cheesecake. As an artist, she created paintings, ceramics and sculptures, and from 2009 she curated the Allee Willis Museum of Kitsch website. She launched a series of fundraising events in Detroit in 2010, with marching bands, in support of the city.

In 2015, Willis appeared as a kitsch expert on episodes of the A&E reality television show Storage Wars assisting Mary Padian.

On September 28, 2017, Willis premiered "The D" , a passion project she wrote, recorded, and produced for her hometown of Detroit, at the Detroit Institute of Arts.

She was the only woman in the year 2018 to be inducted into the Songwriters Hall of Fame. Her compositions are reported to have sold over 60 million records.

Before her death in 2019, she made an appearance on the game show To Tell the Truth. The episode aired on June 18, 2020.

In 2024, The World According to Allee Willis, a biographical documentary by Alexis Manya Spraic, was released.

== Personal life ==
Willis was noted for hosting spectacular parties at her home just outside Hollywood. She said: "I always had a music career, an art career, set designer, film and video, technology. The parties really became the only place I could combine everything."

From 1992 until her death, Willis was in a relationship with Prudence Fenton, an animator and producer.

Willis died of a cardiac arrest in Los Angeles, California on December 24, 2019, at the age of 72.

== Accolades ==
=== Grammy Awards ===
The Grammy Awards are awarded annually by the National Academy of Recording Arts and Sciences of the United States. Willis won two Grammys from three nominations.

Year	Nominee / work	Award	Result
1986	Beverly Hills Cop	Best Soundtrack Album Background Score from a Motion Picture or Television	Won
2006	The Color Purple	Best Musical Show Album	Nominated
2016	The Color Purple	Best Musical Theatre Album	Won

=== Tony Awards ===
Willis was also nominated for a Tony Award.

Year	Category	Nominated work	Result
2006	Original Musical Score	Color Purple	Nominated

=== Emmy Awards ===
Willis was also nominated for an Emmy Award.

Year	Category	Nominated work	Result
1995	Outstanding Individual Achievement in Main Title Theme Music	Friends	Nominated
