= Be Altitude: Respect Yourself =

Studio album by The Staple Singers
- Released: February 14, 1972
- Recorded: 1971–1972
- Studio: Muscle Shoals Sound Studios, Muscle Shoals, Alabama; Ardent Studios, Memphis, TN
- Genre: Soul
- Length: 41:22
- Label: Stax
- Producer: Al Bell

The Staple Singers chronology
The Staple Swingers (1971)	Be Altitude: Respect Yourself (1972)	Be What You Are (1973)

Be Altitude: Respect Yourself is a soul album by The Staple Singers released on February 14, 1972. It includes the hit songs "I'll Take You There" and "Respect Yourself". The musicians are the Muscle Shoals Rhythm Section and the Memphis Horns, augmented by overdubbed guitar, Moog synthesizer, Mellotron and harmonica by Terry Manning.

== Reception ==
Professional ratings
Review scores
Source	Rating
AllMusic	4/5 stars
Christgau's Record Guide	B−

"We the People" was frequently used as a campaign song for U.S. President Joe Biden during the 2020 presidential election in the United States.

== Track listing ==
No.	Title	Writer(s)	Length
1.	"This World"	William Friedman; Herb Schapiro	3:36
2.	"Respect Yourself"	Luther Ingram; Mack Rice	4:54
3.	"Name the Missing Word"	Homer Banks; Bettye Crutcher; Raymond Jackson	4:00
4.	"I'll Take You There"	Alvertis Isbell	4:43
5.	"This Old Town (People in This Town)"	Don Covay; Wilson Pickett; William Stevenson	4:39
6.	"We the People"	Booker T. Jones; Carl Smith	3:50
7.	"Are You Sure"	Banks; Jackson	4:27
8.	"Who Do You Think You Are (Jesus Christ the Superstar)?"	Pops Staples	4:10
9.	"I'm Just Another Soldier"	Banks; Jackson	3:50
10.	"Who"	Jeff Barry; Bobby Bloom	3:13
Total length:			41:22

== Personnel ==
Partial credits from Richard Buskin and Terry Manning.

=== Musicians ===
==== The Staple Singers ====
- Mavis Staples – vocals
- Pops Staples – vocals
- Cleotha Staples – harmony and backing vocals
- Yvonne Staples – harmony and backing vocals

==== Muscle Shoals Rhythm Section ====
- Jimmy Johnson – guitar
- David Hood – bass guitar
- Barry Beckett – keyboards, Wurlitzer electronic piano
- Roger Hawkins – drums

==== Additional musicians ====
- Staple Sisters – harmony and backing vocals
- Terry Manning – guitar, lead guitar, fuzz guitar, Mellotron, Moog synthesizer, vibraphones, marimba, harmonica
- Eddie Hinton – guitar solo on "I'll Take You There"
- Raymond Banks – guitar on "I'll Take You There"
- The Memphis Horns (including Wayne Jackson and Andrew Love – horns (saxophones, trumpets, baritone saxophone, trombone)
- Ben Cauley – horns

=== Production and technical staff ===
- Al Bell – arranger, producer
- Johnny Allen – arranger
- Terry Manning – engineer, additional production (uncredited), additional arrangements (uncredited)
- Jerry Masters – engineer
- Ralph Rhodes – engineer

== Charts ==
Chart (1972)	Peak position
Billboard Pop Albums	19
Billboard Top Soul Albums	3

=== Singles ===
Year	Single	Chart positions	
Year	Single	US Pop	US Soul
1971	"Respect Yourself"	12	2
1972	"I'll Take You There"	1	1
1972	"This World"	38	6
