= The Staple Swingers =

Studio album by The Staple Singers
- Released: June 15, 1971
- Recorded: 1970–1971
- Studios: Ardent Studios in Memphis, Tennessee, and Muscle Shoals Sound Studios in Muscle Shoals, Alabama
- Genre: Pop-soul
- Length: 45:06
- Label: Stax
- Producer: Al Bell

The Staple Singers chronology
We'll Get Over (1970)	The Staple Swingers (1971)	Be Altitude: Respect Yourself (1972)

Professional ratings
Review scores
Source	Rating
AllMusic	3/5 stars
Christgau's Record Guide	B

The Staple Swingers is a soul album by the Staple Singers, released on June 15, 1971.

It was the first Staple Singers album to be produced by Al Bell and recorded in Muscle Shoals. Pervis Staples was replaced by his sister Yvonne Staples prior to the recording of the album. Released in 1971, it charted at number nine on the Billboard Top Soul Albums charts.

== Track listing ==
Side one
No.	Title	Writer(s)	Length
1.	"This Is a Perfect World"	Bettye Crutcher, Mack Rice, Tommy Tate	4:20
2.	"What's Your Thing"	Mack Rice	4:21
3.	"You've Got to Earn It"	Smokey Robinson, Cornelius Grant	3:28
4.	"You're Gonna Make Me Cry"	Deadric Malone	5:04
5.	"Little Boy"	Carson Whitsett	3:25
6.	"How Do You Move a Mountain"	Myrna March, Morris Levy	2:34

Side two
No.	Title	Writer(s)	Length
7.	"Almost"	Harold Thomas, Leroy Mason	4:16
8.	"I'm a Lover"	James Mabone, Charles Bevel	3:43
9.	"Love Is Plentiful"	Bettye Crutcher, Bobby Manuel	2:30
10.	"Heavy Makes You Happy (Sha-Na-Boom Boom)"	Jeff Barry, Bobby Bloom	2:58
11.	"I Like the Things About You"	Martha Stubb, Roebuck "Pops" Staples	3:21
12.	"Give a Hand, Take a Hand"	Barry Gibb, Maurice Gibb	3:55

== Personnel ==
- Cleotha Staples, Mavis Staples, Yvonne Staples – lead and backing vocals
- Roebuck "Pops" Staples – vocals, guitar
- Terry Manning – melodica, guitar, harmonica, vibraphone
- The Memphis Symphony Orchestra – strings, horns
- Muscle Shoals Rhythm Section
- Dale Warren – arrangements
- the Bar-Kays – horn arrangements

Technical

- Jimmy Evans, Larry Hamby, Terry Manning – engineer
- Joel Brodsky – photography

== Charts ==
Chart (1971)	Peak position
Billboard Pop Albums	117
Billboard Top Soul Albums	9

=== Singles ===
Year	Single	Chart positions	
Year	Single	US Pop	US Soul
1970	"Love Is Plentiful"	-	31
1971	"Heavy Makes You Happy (Sha-Na-Boom Boom)"	27	6
1971	"You've Got to Earn It"	97	11
