= Jammed Together =

Studio album by Albert King, Steve Cropper and Pop Staples
- Released: May 1969
- Genre: Blues; soul rock; soul; gospel
- Length: 40:20
- Label: Stax
- Producer: Al Bell; Al Jackson; Albert King; B. T. Jones; David Porter; Homer Banks; Isaac Hayes; Marvell Thomas; Raymond Jackson; Steve Cropper; Terry Manning

Albert King chronology
| Years Gone By (1969) | Jammed Together (1969) | King of the Blues Guitar (1969) |

Steve Cropper chronology
| With a Little Help from My Friends (1969) | Jammed Together (1969) | Playin' My Thang (1971) |

Pop Staples chronology
| Jammed Together (1969) | Peace to the Neighborhood (1992) |

Jammed Together is a collaborative album by the American guitarists Albert King, Steve Cropper and Pop Staples, released by Stax Records in May 1969. The record was spearheaded by Stax executive Al Bell with Al Jackson Jr. and is considered a jam session. Despite this, Cropper says the guitarists did not record together due to their busy schedules, instead recording overdubs. Eleven producers are credited on the packaging.

The album is largely instrumental, although the three musicians sing a song each, and mixes blues, soul and gospel styles, with a hard rock beat and contemporary underground influences, contributing to the overall album's balance of original material and soul and R&B covers. King dominates the music with his string bending and licks, while Cropper employs a more subdued, relaxed style focused on guitar solos, while Staples plays gospel-style tremolo parts.

Peaking at number 171 on the Billboard Top LPs and Tape chart, Jammed Together was one of 27 albums released concurrently by Stax to celebrate their tenth anniversary and new distribution deal with Gulf+Western. Since its release, music critics have contextualized it as a filler release for the guitar album market of the era. Comparisons have been made with contemporary jam albums like Super Blues (1967), Super Session and Grape Jam (both 1968). The album has been re-released several times, including as a budget album in 2001.

== Background ==
Jammed Together is a collaboration between the three most prominent guitarists on Stax Records — blues musician Albert King, gospel artist Pops Staples and Booker T. and the M.G.'s member Steve Cropper. It emerged in a time when Stax encouraged artists, songwriters, producers, engineers and executives associated with the label to work on multiple projects, as a means of keeping the label's product on record shelves; another example of the era was the Boy Meets Girl album, which features Stax artists duetting together, including Staples' siblings and Staples Singers bandmates Mavis, Pervis and Cleotha. Among the contributors to Jammed Together, King had been on Stax's roster since the early 1960s and regularly worked with Cropper and Booker T. Jones on his studio recordings of deep blues music, whereas Cropper was busy throughout 1969, also releasing the solo record With a Little Help from My Friends and working on Johnnie Taylor's Raw Blues, William Bell's Bound to Happen and Delaney & Bonnie's Home.

== Recording and composition ==
Jammed Together is considered a jam session album. Despite this, Cropper says the three guitarists were never in the same room concurrently for the recording the album, deeming it "another rush job". According to Cropper, Stax executive Al Bell spearheaded the project with producer Al Jackson Jr., adding that Bell "brought us in separately to overdub our parts because we were all too busy–Pop and Albert were on the road constantly, and I was in the studio all the time." The critic Peter Wingfield describes it as "a mainly instrumental souped-up jam on whatever material was to hand, produced by whatever staffers were hanging around the studio". Bell, Jackson, King and Cropper are listed as producers for individual tracks alongside Booker T. Jones, David Porter, Homer Banks, Isaac Hayes, Marvell Thomas, Raymond Jackson and Terry Manning.

Although the majority of the material on Jammed Together is instrumental Memphis music, the three guitarists also sing one song each, with the overall album balancing original material and covers of standard soul and R&B songs, including "What I'd Say" and "Baby What You Want Me to Do". It has been categorized as an album of gritty soul-rock which leans heavily on classic jazz blues roots for influence and on a hard rock beat for its hypnotic effect. Beat Instrumental describes the music as an amalgam of soul, gospel and blues styles. King is the lead instrumentalist for much of the album, with Cropper in a more subdued, relaxed role. The former guitarist's work on the record is described by critic John Dougan as "stringbending fury", in contrast to Crooper's intense, simplistic soloing. Cropper's role on the record has also been described as a "session-man filling in the gaps" between Staples' "ringing chordal gospel Fender tremolo", and King, who drowns Staples out with his dominant guitar licks. Horns appear infrequently in a sparing role, sometimes mixed at the front and at other times gentle and "seemingly floating in out of nowhere", a marked contrast to the horn-heavy sound of Cropper's contemporary album With a Little Help from My Friends.

The first side is largely slow and bluesy with a summery feel, whereas the second side is uptempo. The record commences with the Ray Charles cover "What I'd Say", sung by King and spotlighting the interweaving of the three guitarists' work. An ominous version of the John Lee Hooker song "Tupelo" is sung by Staples, who gives the song a sensitive treatment and at one point calls for the other guitarists to take solos. The song's unsettling narrative concerns the Mississippi Flood of 1927, which happened when Staples was living in the area, a fact which Beat Instrumental believe underlines that he is "a real veteran who has seen the evolution of black music and the black American." Cropper recalled: "When Pop song about that 'flood down in Tupelo,' I about died when I heard that, it was so good. But it got lost in all the music we were putting out at the time." "Water" is a rare example of Cropper on vocals, written by him with Eddie Floyd, whereas "Don't Turn Your Heater Down" has been compared to the early work of the Mar-Keys. The critic John Morthland says that the take of "Don't Turn Your Heater Down" is "in serious danger of falling apart in several spots" but is saved by Cropper's discipline and control.

== Release and promotion ==
Priced at $4.79, Jammed Together appeared in the United States in late May 1969, as one of 27 albums that Stax released in the wake of their May 18 sales meeting, celebrating the tenth anniversary of the label. These releases were Stax's first under their new distribution deal with Gulf+Western, and together helped Stax sell a million albums in seven weeks. Another of the albums was Booker T. and the M.G.'s The Booker T. Set. Stax promoted the 27 albums by describing them as "the greatest collection of soul artists ever released anytime, anywhere." Wingfield reflected that Jammed Together was released "as a filler among that absurd 30-album simultaneous release put together when Stax went to the Gulf Corporation." In contrast to the 27 albums that Stax released in late May 1969, the label only released 43 albums from 1961 to 1968 during their partnership with Atlantic Records.

Alongside heavy exposure on FM and R&B radio, Jammed Together reached number 171 on the US Billboard Top LPs and Tape chart, and number 23 on the Best Selling Rhythm & Blues LP's chart. In April 1979, Jammed Together was re-released in the United Kingdom by Stax and EMI, alongside Booker T. and the M.G.'s' Time Is Tight – The Best of... and the Emotions' Heart Association – The Best of.... On September 24, 2001, Ace Records and Stax re-released the album in the UK as a budget album priced at £5.23. Other CD reissues occurred in 1990 and 1991.

== Critical reception ==
Professional ratings
Review scores
| Source | Rating |
|---|---|
| AllMusic | 3/5 stars |
| The Encyclopedia of Popular Music | 3/5 stars |

In a contemporary review, John Morthland of Rolling Stone recommended Jammed Together highly, deeming it more rewarding than other Cropper albums despite some weak points, such as it sounding "a little too slick to be a bona-fide jam session", adding that eleven producers being credited "arouses further suspicions". He adds that although Jammed Together lacks the spontaniety of Moby Grape's Grape Jam (1968), it also avoids the "pretentiousness" of similar collaborations between Mike Bloomfield and Al Kooper, believing that although 'supersessions' were falling out of fashion, "Stax made a wise choice with this one." Record World named it among the magazine's "Pick Hits" and believed that the list of contributing musicians would encourage heavy sales, which "always happens when superstars get together to jam."

In their review, Cash Box described it as "Memphis' answer" to the album Super Session (1968) and opined that it showcased the three leading Stax guitarists "spurring each other on to new entertainment heights", with their combined efforts resulting in a "spectacular" album of straight blues with "artistry lightly touched by underground contemporary influence." More reserved in his assessment, Rex Reed of Stereo Review, who deemed the stereo quality passable, described it as "good listening up to a point" when the guitarists focus on their musicianship, but that listeners would need a high tolerance for "repetitive guitar phrasing and a monotonous drum beat on tightly drawn skins." He criticized the tracks for being "squeezed into one bag and tied together by that infernal drum", advising readers to instead listen to Perez Prado's Voodoo Suite (1955). Bob Dylan called the album "ridiculous" but praised Cropper's "Water" as a "nice song".

Reviewing the 1979 reissue, Melody Maker critic Peter Wingfield described Jammed Together as a "genuine oddity" originally issued as filler to appeal to "the 'guitar hero' rock market of the day". He considered it a patchy album with some novelty appeal, praising several songs but criticizing the guitarists' styles for being incompatible and deeming there to be "too many damn guitar splaying at once", adding that, as with the Chess Records jam album Super Blues (1967), it is "less than the sum of its parts". Reviewing the 2001 reissue, Johnny Chandler of Music Week called it a "fine instrumental album", with "Opus de Soul" being "worth the price of entry alone." John Dougan of AllMusic deemed it less essential than several other Stax records but praised its "loose, raffish appeal", writing that it "never falls into the murk of a boring super-session chopsfest." He added that the musicians were simply having fun playing R&B and soul standards and "wide-open originals", highlighting the strong riffing and Staples' "silky smooth near-falsetto". Miriam DeCosta-Willis considered it one of King's best albums, whereas Rob Bowman called it "an interesting, at times suburb album." In his book Encyclopedia of the Blues (1997), Gérard Herzhaft describes the album as "a breathtaking tour de force of guitars."

== Track listing ==
=== Side one ===
1. "What I'd Say" (Ray Charles) – 5:28
2. "Tupelo" (John Lee Hooker) – 6:00
3. "Opus de Soul" (Alvertis Isbell) – 5:30
4. "Baby, What You Want Me to Do" (Jimmy Reed) – 3:30

=== Side two ===
1. "Big Bird" (Eddie Floyd) – 3:13
2. "Homer's Theme" (Homer Banks, Raymond Jackson) – 2:11
3. "Trashy Dog" (Terry Manning) – 3:00
4. "Don't Turn Your Heater Down" (Isbell, Steve Cropper) – 3:15
5. "Water" (Floyd, Cropper) – 3:06
6. "Knock on Wood" (Floyd, Cropper) – 5:02

== Personnel ==
Adapted from the liner notes of Jammed Together

- Albert King – lead vocals (A1), producer (B6)
- Steve Cropper – lead vocals (B5), producer (B5)
- Pops Staples – lead vocals (A2)
- Al Bell – producer (all tracks)
- Al Jackson – producer (all tracks)
- B. T. Jones – producer (A4, B1)
- David Porter – producer (B4)
- Homer Banks – producer (B2)
- Isaac Hayes – producer (A1, A2, B4)
- Marvell Thomas – producer (A3)
- Raymond Jackson – producer (B2)
- Terry Manning – engineer, producer (B3)
- Bobby Manuel – engineer
- Mickey Buckins – engineer
- Rob Capone – remix engineer

== Chart positions ==
| Chart (1969) | Peak position |
|---|---|
| US Billboard Top LPs & Tape | 171 |
| US Best-Selling Rhythm & Blues LP's | 23 |

== See also ==
- Apple Jam
- Jamming with Edward!
- Jam band
- Memphis soul
