= Be What You Are =

Studio album by The Staple Singers
- Released: September 1973
- Recorded: 1973
- Genre: Soul
- Length: 51:56
- Label: Stax
- Producer: Al Bell

The Staple Singers chronology
Be Altitude: Respect Yourself (1972)	Be What You Are (1973)	City in the Sky (1974)

Professional ratings
Review scores
Source	Rating
AllMusic	3/5 stars
Christgau's Record Guide	B

Be What You Are is a soul album by the Staple Singers, released in September 1973. It reached number 13 on the Billboard Top Soul LPs chart. The first single, "Be What You Are", fared poorly; however, the follow-up, "If You're Ready (Come Go with Me)", was a top ten hit, peaking at number nine on the Billboard Hot 100 and number one on the R&B Singles chart. The third single, "Touch a Hand, Make a Friend" charting at number 23 on the Hot 100 and number three on the R&B chart in 1974.

Guitarist Jimmy Page played acoustic and electric guitars as well as a solo on the last song, "Heaven." Stax engineer Terry Manning was a friend of Page's and worked on Led Zeppelin III.

== Track listing ==
#	Title	Writer(s)	Time
1	"Be What You Are"	Homer Banks, Raymond Jackson, Carl Hampton	5:03
2	"If You're Ready (Come Go with Me)"	Homer Banks, Raymond Jackson, Carl Hampton	4:29
3	"Medley: Love Comes in All Colors/Tellin' Lies"	Bettye Crutcher/Carl Smith	8:51
4	"Touch a Hand, Make a Friend"	Homer Banks, Raymond Jackson, Carl Hampton	4:04
5	"Drown Yourself"	Bettye Crutcher	4:38
6	"I Ain't Raisin' No Sand"	Darryl Carter, Mack Rice	6:33
7	"Grandma's Hands"	Bill Withers	2:43
8	"Bridges Instead of Walls"	Homer Banks, Raymond Jackson, Carl Hampton	4:04
9	"I'm on Your Side"	Homer Banks, Raymond Jackson, Carl Hampton	4:00
10	"That's What Friends Are For"	Mack Rice	4:16
11	"Heaven"	Terry Manning	3:36

== Personnel ==
- Cleotha Staples, Mavis Staples, Yvonne Staples - lead and backing vocals
- Roebuck "Pops" Staples - vocals, guitar
- Jimmy Page - uncredited guitar (on track 11)

== Charts ==
Chart (1973)	Peak position
Billboard Top LPs	102
Billboard Top Soul LPs	13

=== Singles ===
Year	Single	Chart positions	
Year	Single	US Pop	US Soul
1973	"Be What You Are"	66	18
1973	"If You're Ready (Come Go with Me)"	9	1
1974	"Touch a Hand, Make a Friend"	23	3
