= Where Are We Going (Bobby Bloom song) =

Song by Bobby Bloom
- B-side: "Of Yesterday"
- Released: 1970
- Label: Roulette R-7095
- Songwriter: M. L. Lane-J. Linde
- Producer: Vinny Testa

Bobby Bloom singles chronology
"Make Me Happy" (1971)	"Where Are We Going" (1970)	"We're All Goin' Home" (1971)

"Where Are We Going" is a song recorded by Bobby Bloom. Released on the Roulette label, Bloom had a chart hit with it in 1971. Bloom had no credited involvement in the composition or production of the song.

== Background ==
It was reported by Cash Box in the December 19, 1970, issue that Roulette had acquired some Bobby Bloom tapes. From the tapes, the first single "Where Are We Going" was made ready for immediate release. The vice-president for the label's sales and marketing division, Sonny Kirkshen said that there was the possibility of a Bobby Bloom album in the near future.

It was noted by Cash Box in the magazine's January 16, 1971, issue that chart action had grown for Bloom's "Where Are We Going". Due to his hit "Montego Bay", he had established an audience for additional product.

The single was released in Brazil on RCA Victor ROC-11002 as a 33 rpm 7-inch single.

== Reception ==
"Where Are We Going" was reviewed by Cash Box in the magazine's December 19, 1970, issue. It was in the Picks of the Week section. Referring to it as a "teen outing" the reviewer said that it should capture the Top 40 ear and that it would benefit Bloom's status. It was also reviewed in the December 19 issue of Billboard. Taking into account Bloom's current hit status with "Montego Bay", the reviewer called it a potent rocker and said that it had Hot 100 potential.

== Airplay ==
It was noted by Cash Box in the December 19 issue that "Where Are We Going" had been added to the playlist of WPOP in Hartford, Connecticut.

For the week of January 16, his song was at no. 12 in the Cash Box Radio Active chart. 28% of key radio stations had added the song to their program schedule that week. For the week of January 23, the song was added to the playlist of Top 40 station KJR in Seattle.

== Charts ==
=== Cash Box ===
"Where Are We Going" debuted at no. 25 on the Cash Box Looking Ahead Chart on the week of December 26. For the week of January 23, 1971, it was at no. 5 on the chart and had entered the Cash Box Top 100 chart at no. 97.

=== Billboard ===
For the week ending January 2, 1971, "Where Are We Going" was at no 115 in the Billboard Bubbling Under The Hot 100 chart. and debuted at no. 100 on the Billboard Hot 100 chart the following week. On January 30, 1971, the song peaked at no. 84 on the Hot 100.
