= City in the Sky =

Studio album by Staple Singers
- Released: 1974
- Studio: Ardent
- Genre: Soul, pop
- Label: Stax
- Producer: Al Bell

Staple Singers chronology
| Be What You Are (1973) | City in the Sky (1974) | Let's Do It Again (1975) |

City in the Sky is an album by the American music group the Staple Singers, released in 1974. It was the group's final album for Stax Records. The 1990s reissue appended bonus tracks from the group's set at Wattstax.

The title track was released as the first single. The album peaked at No. 125 on the Billboard 200.

== Production ==
City in the Sky was recorded at Ardent Studios in October 1972, during sessions that were originally undertaken in order to construct a double album. It was produced by Al Bell.

== Critical reception ==
Professional ratings
Review scores
| Source | Rating |
|---|---|
| AllMusic | 3/5 stars |
| Robert Christgau | B+ |
| The Commercial Appeal | 4/4 stars |
| The Encyclopedia of Popular Music | 3/5 stars |
| (The New) Rolling Stone Album Guide | 2/5 stars |

Robert Christgau called City in the Sky the group's "toughest and best Stax LP," writing that "though their social vision may be vague, at least they were political before it was commercial, which gives them an edge." The Sacramento Bee deemed "My Main Man" "a happy track steeped deep in reggae, churchy hand-clapping and the unmistakable Latin feel of those old Drifters records."

Reviewing a reissue, The Commercial Appeal wrote that "it's one classic interpretation after another with brilliant socio-political numbers like 'Back Road Into Town', 'Washington We're Watching You' and 'Something Ain't Right'." Record Collector deemed it "a solid soul album without making too many claims to be essential."

== Track listing ==
| No. | Title | Length |
|---|---|---|
| 1. | "Back Road into Town" | 4:19 |
| 2. | "City in the Sky" | 3:51 |
| 3. | "Washington We're Watching You" | 3:54 |
| 4. | "Something Ain't Right" | 3:48 |
| 5. | "Today Was Tomorrow Yesterday" | 4:16 |
| 6. | "My Main Man" | 2:12 |
| 7. | "There Is a God" | 3:01 |
| 8. | "Blood Pressure" | 3:31 |
| 9. | "If It Ain't One Thing It's Another" | 4:22 |
| 10. | "Who Made the Man" | 4:13 |
| 11. | "Getting Too Big for Your Britches" | 4:42 |

== Personnel ==
- Pop Staples – vocals, guitar
- Cleotha Staples – vocals
- Mavis Staples – vocals
- Yvonne Staples – vocals
