= Touch a Hand, Make a Friend =

1974 single by the Staple Singers

Single by the Staple Singers

from the album Be What You Are
- B-side: "Tellin' Lies"
- Released: January 1974
- Recorded: 1973
- Genre: Funk
- Length: 3:26
- Label: Stax
- Songwriters: Homer Banks, Raymond Jackson, Carl Hampton
- Producer: Al Bell

The Staple Singers singles chronology
| "If You're Ready (Come Go with Me)" (1973) | "Touch a Hand, Make a Friend" (1974) | "City in the Sky" (1974) |

"Touch a Hand, Make a Friend" is a song written by Homer Banks, Raymond Jackson and Carl Hampton, and first recorded by The Staple Singers for their album Be What You Are. It was one of The Staple Singers most successful singles and peaked at number three on the Billboard Hot Soul Singles chart and number 23 on its Hot 100 chart in 1973. The single also reached number 27 on the Billboard Adult Contemporary chart.

== The Oak Ridge Boys version ==
The Oak Ridge Boys released the song in August 1985 as the second single from Step On Out. It was their thirteenth number one on the country chart and appeared at number 38 on the Billboard Hot Country Songs 1985 Year-End chart. In Canada, the single topped the RPM Country Tracks chart.
