= The Return of Bruno =

The Return of Bruno may refer to:

- The Return of Bruno (film), a 1987 mockumentary film, starring Bruce Willis
- The Return of Bruno (album), a 1987 album by American actor Bruce Willis
