= Kane Gang =

English music trio (1982–1991)

The Kane Gang
- Origin: Durham, England
- Genres: Pop; sophisti-pop
- Years active: 1982–1991
- Labels: London; Capitol
- Past members: Martin Brammer; Paul Woods; Dave Brewis

The Kane Gang are an English pop trio formed in Durham in 1982. The group comprised Martin Brammer, Paul Woods and Dave Brewis. They scored several UK and US hits in the 1980s. The group announced a 40th anniversary comeback tour, of three dates, on 14 August 2024.

== History ==
Vocalists Martin Brammer (born 13 May 1957, Seaham, County Durham) and Paul Woods, with multi-instrumentalist Dave Brewis, formed the trio in 1982, after meeting while in small local bands, and signed to Kitchenware Records, which led to a deal with London Records in 1984.

Their debut album, The Bad and Lowdown World of the Kane Gang (released in the US as Lowdown), was released the following year. It spawned two UK hit singles: "Closest Thing to Heaven" (No. 12) and a cover of the Staples Singers' "Respect Yourself" (No. 21). The latter was also a hit in Australia, reaching No. 19. The album was co-produced by Pete Wingfield, and featured P. P. Arnold and Sam Brown as backing vocalists. Two tracks "Gun Law" and "Take This Train" were produced by Robin Millar.

The band's next album, Miracle, also co-produced by Pete Wingfield, was released in 1987 and spawned two US hit singles: "Motortown" (No. 36 US / No. 45 UK) and another cover – this time of Dennis Edwards' "Don't Look Any Further" (No. 64 US / No. 52 UK). The latter hit No. 1 on the US Dance Charts.

Woods left the band in 1991 to attempt a solo career. Woods and Brewis also worked on songs leading to releasing an album, Infiniti Drive as Autoleisureland in 2022, named after a 1970s Sunderland car-themed retail unit, and continue to write and record.

It was announced that the Kane Gang would reunite for concerts at Sunderland's The Fire Station music venue on 2 November 2024, at London's Dingwalls on 24 January 2025, and at Glasgow's St. Luke's on 25 February 2025.

== Other works ==
The Kane Gang performed the music for the "Ooh Gary Davies... On Your Radio" jingle for BBC Radio 1. As was the fashion around that time, bands would adapt songs to provide the radio station with a jingle, and embed the hook of the track in the public's consciousness. The Gary Davies jingle was based on their track "Smalltown Creed" (from the LP The Bad and Lowdown World of the Kane Gang). The jingle was also adapted for John Peel, David Jensen, and Richard Skinner, amongst others. The same track was used as the basis for the theme tune of long-running Children's BBC television programme Byker Grove, which launched the careers of Ant & Dec (as PJ & Duncan) and Donna Air.

== Discography ==
=== Studio albums ===
List of albums, with selected chart positions
Title	Album details	Peak chart positions		
Title	Album details	UK	AUS	US
The Bad and Lowdown World of the Kane Gang	Released: March 1985; Label: London Records (820215–1); Also: Kitchenware Records (UK, KWLP2, 1985)	21	65	—
Miracle	Released: March 1987; Label: London Records (828057–1)	41	82	115

=== Compilation albums ===
Title	Album details
The Miracle of the Kane Gang	Released: 2007

=== Singles ===
Year	Single	Peak chart positions				
Year	Single	US Hot 100	US Adult	US Dance	AUS	UK
1983	"Brother Brother"	—	—	—	—	—
1984	"Smalltown Creed"	—	—	—	—	60
1984	"Closest Thing to Heaven"	—	—	—	57	12
1984	"Respect Yourself"	—	—	—	19	21
1985	"Gun Law"	—	—	—	—	53
1987	"Motortown"	36	12	—	87	45
1987	"What Time Is It?"	—	—	—	—	—
1987	"Don't Look Any Further"	64	—	1	—	52
"—" denotes releases that did not chart.

== See also ==
- List of Billboard number-one dance club songs
- List of artists who reached number one on the U.S. Dance Club Songs chart
- List of number-one dance singles of 1988 (U.S.)
- List of one-hit wonders in the United States
- List of performers on Top of the Pops
- Bands and musicians from Yorkshire and North East England
- Now That's What I Call Music 4 (UK series)
