= Sha La Boom Boom =

Song by Bobby Bloom
- A-side: "Sha La La Boom"
- B-side: "Stay On Top"
- Released: 1972
- Length: 2:48
- Label: MGM K 14437
- Composer: Jeff Barry - Bobby Bloom
- Producer: Jeff Barry

Bobby Bloom singles chronology
| "I Really Got It Bad for You" (1972) | "Sha La Boom Boom" (1972) | "Island" (1973) |

"Sha La La Boom Boom" was a single for Bobby Bloom in 1972. Co-written by Bloom with Jeff Barry, it became a hit and reached the Cash Box, Billboard and Record World charts early the following year. It was a new attempt of an earlier song.

== Background ==
"Sha La Boom Boom" backed with "Stay on Top" was released on MGM K 14437 in 1972. It was written by Jeff Barry and Bobby Bloom. Barry also produced it. This was Bloom's final charting song. He died the following year in what was said to be an accidental shooting accident.

According to Sonic Hits, the song is a philosophical song and a way to find joy in something that can get us down. It reaches back to some of the positivity that was around in the late 1960s and early 1970s.

== Reception ==
A Single Pick in the December 9 issue of Record World, the reviewer said "that "Montego Bay" man is back and called the song a "brilliant job".

It was in the Choice Programming section in the December 16 issue of Cash Box.

It was in the Also Recommended section of the Billboard "Radio Action and Pick Singles" page for the week of December 16, 1978.

== Charts ==
=== Cash Box ===
"Sha La Boom Boom" made its debut in the Cash Box Looking Ahead chart at no. 104 on the week of January 27, 1973. The following week (Feb 3) it had entered the Cash Box Top 100 Singles chart at no. 100. On February 10 it was back in the Looking Ahead chart at no. 101. It remained in the Looking Ahead chart until March 3 where it exited at 110.

=== Record World ===
For the week of February 10, the record made its debut in the Record World 101 - 150 chart at number 139. It peaked at no. 136 on the week of February 24, and held the position for another week before exiting at 141 on the week of March 10.

=== Billboard ===
For the week of February 17, the single was at no. 126 on the Billboard Bubbling Under the HOT 100 chart. It was also recorded by Billboard that week that he had a single "We Need Each Other" at no. 14 charting in Rio De Jeneiro. "Sha La Boom Boom" peaked at no. 123 on the Bubbling Under the HOT 100 chart on the week ending March 3, 1973.

| Chart (1973) | Peak position |
|---|---|
| US Cash Box Looking Ahead | 101 |
| US Cash Box Top 100 Singles | 100 |
| Record World 101 - 150 | 136 |
| Bubbling Under The Hot 100 (Billboard) | 123 |

== Other versions ==
Trini Lopez recorded a version that was released in October 1975 as "Sha-La-Boom-Boom-Yeah". Backed with "Satisfaction" it was one of the Picks of the Week. It received a positive review in the October 25 issue of Cash Box with the reviewer saying that Lopez had voice that made a huge contribution to the recording industry and this song could be another "La Bamba". The following week it was reviewed by Record World with the reviewer saying that he had returned the sound that made him so successful in the 60s and had given the song a Latino workout. The producer on Lopez's release was Capitol Records' former A&R director Stan Silverberg.
