= Respect Yourself =

1971 single by the Staple Singers

Single by the Staple Singers

from the album Be Altitude: Respect Yourself
- B-side: "You're Gonna Make Me Cry"
- Released: October 1, 1971
- Recorded: 1971
- Genre: Soul, rock
- Length: 4:54 (album version); 3:30 (single version)
- Label: Stax
- Songwriters: Luther Ingram, Mack Rice
- Producer: Al Bell

The Staple Singers singles chronology
"You've Got to Earn It" (1971)	"Respect Yourself" (1971)	"I'll Take You There" (1972)

"Respect Yourself" is a song by Luther Ingram and Mack Rice recorded by the American R&B/gospel group the Staple Singers. Released in late 1971 from their album Be Altitude: Respect Yourself, the song became a crossover hit. The Staple Singers' version peaked at No. 12 on the Hot 100, No. 2 on the Hot Soul Singles chart, and is one of the group's most recognizable hits. In 2002, the song was inducted into the Grammy Hall of Fame, and in 2010 it was ranked number 468 on the Rolling Stone list of the 500 Greatest Songs of All Time, moving down from number 464 in 2004.

== Writing and recording ==
The song was written by Stax Records singer Luther Ingram and house songwriter Mack Rice. Ingram, who was frustrated with the state of the world at the time, told Rice "black folk need to learn to respect themselves." Rice liked the comment so much that he built a funk groove around it, prepared a demo record, and suggested to record producer Al Bell that the Staple Singers record it. The group agreed.

Bell teamed the group with the Muscle Shoals Rhythm Section of Muscle Shoals, Alabama, musicians who laid down classic tracks for Wilson Pickett and Aretha Franklin, and with engineer/musician Terry Manning for vocals, overdubs, and mixing, in Memphis. The musicians were Barry Beckett (keyboards), Roger Hawkins (drums), Jimmy Johnson (guitar), and David Hood (bass), with lead vocals by "Pops" and Mavis Staples. The horns were overdubbed by Manning after the vocals were recorded, and were played by the Memphis Horns led by Andrew Love and Wayne Jackson. The song had resonance for a burgeoning self-empowerment movement for African-Americans during the post-civil-rights movement of the 1970s.

== Personnel ==
Partial credits from Richard Buskin and Terry Manning.

The Staple Singers

- Mavis Staples - vocals
- Pops Staples - vocals
- Cleotha Staples - harmony and backing vocals
- Yvonne Staples - harmony and backing vocals

Muscle Shoals Rhythm Section

- Jimmy Johnson - guitar
- David Hood - bass
- Barry Beckett - keyboards, Wurlitzer electric piano
- Roger Hawkins - drums

Additional musicians

- Staple Sisters - harmony and backing vocals
- Terry Manning - lead guitar, Moog synthesizer
- The Memphis Horns (including Wayne Jackson and Andrew Love - horns (saxophones, trumpets, baritone saxophone, trombone)
- Ben Cauley - horns

Production and technical staff

- Al Bell – arranger, producer
- Johnny Allen - arranger
- Terry Manning – engineer, additional production (uncredited), additional arrangements (uncredited)
- Jerry Masters – engineer
- Ralph Rhodes – engineer

== Charts ==
Chart (1971–1972)	Peak position
Canada Top Singles (RPM)	17
US Billboard Hot 100	12
US Hot R&B/Hip-Hop Songs (Billboard)	2

== The Kane Gang version ==
"Respect Yourself"

Single by Kane Gang

from the album The Bad and Lowdown World of the Kane Gang
- B-side: "Amusement Park"
- Released: October 29, 1984
- Genre: Pop
- Label: Kitchenware; London
- Songwriters: Mack Rice; Luther Ingram
- Producers: Pete Wingfield; The Kane Gang

Kane Gang singles chronology
"Closest Thing to Heaven" (1984)	"Respect Yourself" (1984)	"Gun Law" (1985)

In 1984, the British pop band the Kane Gang covered the song for their 1985 debut album The Bad and Lowdown World of the Kane Gang. Produced by Pete Wingfield and the band, it was released as the third single from the album. This version charted at number 19 in Australia and number 21 in the UK. The Kane Gang's version changes the lyric "If you don't give a heck about the man with the Bible in his hands" to "If you don't give a damn about the man with the Bible in his hands".

=== Charts ===
Chart (1984–1985)	Peak position
Australia (Kent Music Report)	19
Belgium (Ultratop 50 Flanders)	27
Netherlands (Dutch Top 40)	31
Netherlands (Single Top 100)	28
UK Singles (Official Charts)	21

== Bruce Willis version ==
"Respect Yourself"

Single by Bruce Willis

from the album The Return of Bruno
- B-side: "Fun Time"
- Released: December 1986
- Recorded: 1986
- Length: 3:53
- Label: Motown
- Songwriters: Luther Ingram, Mack Rice
- Producer: Robert Kraft

Bruce Willis singles chronology
"Respect Yourself" (1986)	"Young Blood" (1987)

In 1986, the American actor Bruce Willis (as his fictional alter ego Bruno Radolini) began a short-lived singing career by covering "Respect Yourself" for his 1987 album The Return of Bruno, and the associated mockumentary HBO television special The Return of Bruno. Released in December 1986 as his debut single and produced by Robert Kraft, the song is a faithful rendition of the Staple Singers' original, with the Pointer Sisters singing the main lines, and Willis accompanying them on harmonica and voice. This was Willis's highest-charting song.

=== Charts ===
Chart (1987)	Peak position
Australia (Kent Music Report)	57
Belgium (Ultratop 50 Flanders)	23
Canada Top Singles (RPM)	8
Italy Airplay (Music & Media)	1
Netherlands (Single Top 100)	57
New Zealand (Recorded Music NZ)	26
UK Singles (Official Charts)	7
US Billboard Hot 100	5
US Hot R&B/Hip-Hop Songs (Billboard)	20

Year-end chart (1987)	Position
US Top Pop Singles (Billboard)	89

== Robert Palmer version ==
In 1995, the British singer Robert Palmer covered the song as part of The Very Best of Robert Palmer and released it as a single, both released that October. Palmer's version reached number 45 in the UK and number 170 in Australia.

=== Charts ===
Chart (1995)	Peak position
Australia (Kent Music Report)	170
UK (OCC)	45
