= Sea of Faces (disambiguation) =

Sea of Faces is a 2004 album by the Christian rock group Kutless.

Sea of Faces may also refer to:

- "Sea of Faces (song)", a 1966 single for the group The Ways and Means
- A Sea of Faces, a 1975 album by jazz saxophonist Archie Shepp
