= We're All Goin' Home =

"We're All Goin Home"

Song by Bobby Bloom
- B-side: "Careful Not to Break the Spell"
- Released: 1971
- Label: MGM K 14246
- Songwriter: Barry-Bloom-Goldberg
- Producer: Jeff Barry

Bobby Bloom singles chronology
"Heavy Makes You Happy" (1970)	"We're All Goin Home" (1971)	"We Need Each Other" (1971)

"We're All Goin' Home" was a 1971 single for American singer Bobby Bloom. It became a hit for him registering in the Billboard and Cash Box charts.

== Background ==
Released in April, 1971, "We're All Goin' Home" was composed by Jeff Barry, Bobby Bloom and Neil Goldberg and released on MGM K14246. It was backed with "Careful Not to Break the Spell" which was written by Jeff Barry and Bobby Bloom. Barry produced both sides.

The B side song "Careful Not to Break the Spell" was covered by Geno Washington.

== Reception ==
It was a Top 60 Spotlight single in the 24 April issue of Billboard. With the reviewer calling the song one of the best produced and performed entries for the week, an impact in sales, and a Hot 100 prediction was made.

It was reviewed in the April 24 issue of Record World with the reviewer saying it should do some "Montego Bay-type action.

It was one of the Cash Box Picks of the Week in the magazine's May 1 issue. With the reviewer calling the record a comment on peace and brotherhood, the reviewer also said that the record had "all the ingredients necessary for top 40 appeal".

== Airplay ==
It was noted by Cash Box that the record was added to the playlist of KEYN in Wichita for the week of May 1, 1971. The following week Cash Box noted that it was added to the playlist of WAPE in Jacksonville, and WBBQ in Augusta.

On the KHJ Boss 30 survey chart, the single debuted on May 26, 1971, and peaked at no. 15. The song debuted on KRLA at 24 on 15 June 1971.

== Charts ==
"We're All Goin' Home" debuted on the Billboard Hot 100 chart at no. 95 for the week ending June 26, 1971. It peaked at no. 93 for the week ending 10 July.

For the week of May 15, the record made its debut at no. 30 on the Cash Box Looking Ahead chart.
