= Don't Lose This =

Studio album by Roebuck "Pops" Staples
- Released: 2015
- Studio: Hinge Sound, Chicago, Illinois; The Loft
- Label: dBpm Records
- Producer: Jeff Tweedy, Mavis Staples, Pops Staples

Roebuck "Pops" Staples chronology
| Father Father (1994) | Don't Lose This (2015) |

Don't Lose This is a 2015 posthumous album by American gospel and R&B musician Pops Staples. The album was put together with various musicians, using unfinished tracks from 1998 that were intended for a "lost" album by The Staple Singers. The album was produced by Jeff Tweedy of Wilco. The album reached #16 on the Independent Albums chart.

== History ==
The title of the album comes from words that Staples spoke to his daughter Mavis Staples just prior to his death. He told her, "don't lose this, here," referring to 10 recordings that he made in 1998. Mavis teamed up with Jeff Tweedy in 2014 to produce the tracks and finish the album. Tweedy had previously produced Mavis' albums You Are Not Alone and One True Vine. Tweedy played bass on the album and his son Spencer played drums.

== Track listing ==
All tracks composed by Pops Staples; except where indicated

| No. | Title | Writer(s) | Length |
|---|---|---|---|
| 1. | "Somebody Was Watching" | Brenda Burns | 4:07 |
| 2. | "Sweet Home" | Margaret Allison | 4:14 |
| 3. | "No News is Good News" | | 4:36 |
| 4. | "Love on My Side" | | 4:03 |
| 5. | "Friendship" | Homer Banks, Lester Snell | 4:06 |
| 6. | "Nobody's Fault but Mine" | | 3:07 |
| 7. | "The Lady's Letter" | | 2:19 |
| 8. | "Better Home" | | 4:49 |
| 9. | "Will the Circle Be Unbroken" | | 4:05 |
| 10. | "Gotta Serve Somebody" | Bob Dylan | 3:31 |

== Personnel ==
- Pops Staples - guitar, vocals
- Mavis Staples - vocals on "Sweet Home", "Love on My Side" and "Better Home"
- Jeff Tweedy - guitar on "Sweet Home", "Love on My Side" and "Will the Circle Be Unbroken"; bass
- Tom Grady - bass
- Scott Ligon - piano
- Spencer Tweedy, Tim Austin - drums
- Cleotha Staples, Mavis Staples, Yvonne Staples - backing vocals
