= Uncloudy Day (album) =

Studio album by The Staple Singers
- Released: 1959
- Recorded: 1956–1959
- Genre: Gospel music
- Length: 35:36
- Label: Vee-Jay; VJLP 5000
- Producer: Calvin Carter

The Staple Singers chronology
Uncloudy Day (1959)	Will the Circle Be Unbroken (1960)

Uncloudy Day is a collection of recordings made between 1956 and 1959 by the Staple Singers, many of which that were originally released as 10-inch, 78 rpm shellac discs, that became the first 12-inch Gospel LP released by the Vee-Jay label.

== Critical reception ==
Professional ratings
Review scores
Source	Rating
AllMusic	4.5/5 stars

AllMusic reviewer Opal Nations stated "Classic folk-rooted gospel from this mixed group. Stinging Delta guitar. Stunning harmonies".

== Track listing ==
All compositions by Roebuck Staples except where noted

1. "Uncloudy Day" (Josiah Kelley Alwood) – 3:02
2. "Let Me Ride" – 2:46
3. "God's Wonderful Love" (James Bracken) – 2:46
4. "Help Me Jesus" – 2:45
5. "I'm Coming Home" – 6:45
6. "If I Could Hear My Mother Pray" (Mavis Staples) – 2:52
7. "Low Is the Way" (Alex Bradford) – 2:36
8. "I Had a Dream" – 2:55
9. "On My Way to Heaven" – 2:24
10. "Going Away" – 2:00
11. "I'm Leaning" – 2:21
12. "I Know I Got Religion" – 2:24

== Personnel ==
- Roebuck Staples – vocals, guitar
- Cleotha Staples, Mavis Staples, Pervis Staples, Yvonne Staples – vocals
