= The Bobby Bloom Album =

Studio album by Bobby Bloom
- Released: 1970
- Labels: L&R LR-1035; MGM LR-1035
- Producer: Jeff Barry

Bobby Bloom chronology
The Bobby Bloom Album (1970)	Where Are We Going (1970)

The Bobby Bloom Album was the first album for composer, producer and singer Bobby Bloom. It charted in late 1970 through to early 1971. It contained his hits "Montego Bay" and "Heavy Makes You Happy".

== Background ==
According to Billboard in the July 25, 1970 issue, a promotion had been launched by the Robert Stigwood organization and MGM for "Montego Bay", Bobby Bloom's first release for the label as well as his album. A promo film produced by Gene Weed for television stations around the country was to be made. MGM's West Coast production manager Rick Sidoti was accompanying Bloom on a tour of the West Coast radio stations, one stops and record dealers to promote the single and album.

The album was produced by Jeff Barry and released on L&R LR-1035 in 1970. The L&R label was founded by Joey Levine and Artie Resnick. The L&R label had begun as Earth Records in 1969 but had to change to L&R due to legal action from Motown Records as the Rare Earth label was owned by them. The L&R is a representation of the initials of Joey Levine and Artie Resnik.

Geno Washington covered "Give 'Em a Hand" which was the B side of his single, "Dirty Dirty" which was released in 1972 on Pye. Washington also recorded "Careful Not to Break the Spell" which was unreleased until the late 1990s.

== Reception ==
The album was reviewed in the August 29 issue of Record World. One of the Pick Hits, the reviewer began with "A deep and manly voice to reckon with here". Noting Bloom's and Barry's playing of guitars, piano and drums, the reviewer said there were "all sorts of hits on the album" and that it was "some achievement".

Reviewed by Franko of the What Frank is Listening to blog in September 2014, the picks were "Heavy Makes You Happy (Sha-Na-Boom-Boom)", "Oh, I Wish You Knew", "Give 'Em a Hand" and "Montego Bay".

== Chart performance ==
The album made its debut at no. 130 on the Billboard Top LPs chart for the week ending November 28. It peaked at no. 126.

The album made its debut at no. 99 on the Cash Box Top 100 Albums chart for the week of December 5, 1970. It reached its peak position of no. 95 on the week of December 19. The following week it was at no. 101 in the Cash Box Top 100 Albums 101 to 140 chart. It remained in the 101 to 140 chart until February 6.

== Track listing ==
Side one

1. "Careful Not to Break the Spell" - 5:30
2. "Heavy Makes You Happy" - 3:58
3. "Try a Little Harder" - 3:03
4. "Oh I Wish You Knew" - 2:50
5. "Fanta" - 2:07
6. "Heidi" - 3:45

Side two

1. "This Thing I've Gotten Into" - 2:30
2. "A Little on the Heavy Side" - 2:54
3. "Brighten Your Flame" - 2:43
4. "Give 'Em a Hand" - 4:12
5. "Montego Bay" - 2:53

== Personnel ==
- Producer: Jeff Barry
- Percussion and Lots of the Guitar, Piano, and Drums: Bobby Bloom, Jeff Barry
- Lead Guitar: Jimmy Calvert
- Recording Engineer: Art Polhemus
- Uncredited Brill Building Musicians - Instrumentation
