= Love, Don't Let Me Down =

Song by Bobby Bloom
- Released: May, 1967
- Studio: A&R Studios
- Genre: Pop, R&B
- Length: 2:02
- Label: Kama Sutra KA 223
- Composers: Andreoli, Poncia, Linde, Bloom
- Producers: Artie Ripp, John Linde, Bobby Bloom

Bobby Bloom singles chronology
"I Still Remember" (1965)	"Love, Don't Let Me Down" (1967)	"Count on Me" (1967)

Love, Don't Let Me Down was a 1967 single for US singer Bobby Bloom. A hit for him, its national chart status was recorded in music trade magazines, Cash Box and Record World. It was popular on both pop and r&b stations. The song has also been covered by Kim Weston and Robin Wilson. It has also achieved a degree of popularity on the northern soul scene.

== Background ==
"Love, Don't Let Me Down" / "Where Is the Woman" was released on Kama Sutra KA 223 in March 1967. Bobby Bloom was one of the co-writers as well as a co-producer. The record was cut at A&R Studios. It was reported in the March 25, 1967 issue of Record World that Kama Sutra artist Bobby Bloom had his label behind him and they were pushing for this single to be a hit.

== Reception ==
The single was reviewed in the March 18 issue of Cash Box, Newcomer Picks section. It received a positive review with the review calling it a "strong, throbbing rocker" that could be big with the buyers. The B side "Where is the Woman" was referred to as a lowdown moaner.

It was Hot 100 prediction in the Spotlight Singles section of the March 25 issue of Billboard.

== Airplay ==
According to Johnny Davis an exec. for the label, there was a great national reaction to the record. According to the March 25 issue of Record World, the song was also one of the picks at WDRC.

Along with "The Happening" by The Supremes, "Portrait of My Love" by the Tokens, " Girl, You'll Be a Woman Soon" by Neil Diamond etc., " Love, Don't Let Me Down" was one of WABC's hot prospects on the week of 28 March 1967.

As recorded by Cash Box in the April 1 issue 7% of radio stations surveyed by the magazine had added the single to their program schedule that week.

It was reported in the April 8 issue of Record World that the single had been picked up by some of the top r&b stations. It had also been picked up by twelve major pop stations, stations; WABC, WMEX, CKLW, KLIF, KILT, KIMN, WRKO, WDRC, WDEE, WAVZ, WPRO and WKAK which had given Bloom audiences in N.Y., Boston, Detroit, Dallas, Houston, Denver, Hartford, New Haven, Nashville, and Providence.

== Charts ==
For the week of April 8, 1967, the record made its debut in the Record World Singles Coming Up chart at no. 10. It also made its debut on the Cash Box Looking Ahead chart at no. 45 that same week. It peaked at no. 30 on the Cash Box Looking Ahead chart on the week of April 22. It also peaked at no. 8 on the Record World Singles Coming Up chart that same week.

=== Summary ===
Chart (1967)	Peak position
Singles Coming Up (Record World)	8
Looking Ahead (Cash Box)	30

== Other versions ==
Kim Weston also covered the song which appeared on her Big Brass Four Poster album that was released in 1970. Weston's album was reviewed by Bad Cat Records in the 2000s. With the tracks being rated individually by the site, "Love, Don't Let Me Down" was given two stars with the reviewer saying it sounded like two songs stitched together.

Also in 1970, Robin Wilson's album Ain’t That Something included her version of "Love, Don't Let Me Down". It was produced by Bob Alcivar. The song was on side one, track three.
