= Very Extremely Dangerous =

Studio album by Eddie Hinton
- Released: 1978
- Recorded: 1977
- Studio: Muscle Shoals
- Genre: White soul, R&B
- Label: Capricorn
- Producer: Barry Beckett

Eddie Hinton chronology
Very Extremely Dangerous (1978)	Letters from Mississippi (1987)

Very Extremely Dangerous is the debut album by the American musician Eddie Hinton, released in 1978. It had sold around 20,000 copies before Capricorn Records filed for bankruptcy. Hinton had intended to tour behind it with his backing band, the Rocking Horses.

The album was rereleased in 1997 as part of the Capricorn Classics series. Demos of some of the songs were released in 2000 on the Dear Y'all compilation.

== Production ==
Recorded in 1977, the album was produced by Barry Beckett and recorded at Muscle Shoals Sound Studio. Hinton was backed by the Muscle Shoals Rhythm Section. He wrote or cowrote all the songs aside from "Shout Bamalama", a cover of the Otis Redding song. "We Got It" is a paean to Hinton's wife, Sandra.

== Critical reception ==
Professional ratings
Review scores
Source	Rating
All Music Guide to Soul	5/5 stars
Robert Christgau	B−
The Encyclopedia of Popular Music	2/5 stars
Fort Worth Star-Telegram	3.5/5 stars
Omaha World-Herald	2.5/5 stars
Southern Rock Review	8/10

The Commercial Appeal said that "Hinton's phrasing is classic R&B, full of gut-busting tension". The San Francisco Chronicle concluded, "Without so much as even a passing nod to any rhythm and blues innovation of the past 12 years, the album thumps out of the speakers like a classic r&b work of the period." The Sunday Ledger-Enquirer said that Hinton's "voice seems rough hewn and you get the idea he's worked to get it that way." The Sacramento Union praised the "sweet, rolling musical foundation that is punctuated by some hot horn parts." The Lincoln Journal Star listed Very Extremely Dangerous among the 12 best albums of 1978.

In 1995, Rolling Stone called the album "a fiery blast of white-soul singing". In 1999, the Winston-Salem Journal listed it among 12 of the best "overlooked" albums.

== Track listing ==
Side 1

1. "You Got Me Singing"
2. "Concept World"
3. "I Got the Feeling"
4. "Shout Bamalama"
5. "Get Off in It"

Side 2

1. "Brand New Man"
2. "Shoot the Moon"
3. "We Got It"
4. "Yeah Man"
5. "I Want It All"
