= Closest Thing to Heaven (Kane Gang song) =

1984 single by the Kane Gang

Single by the Kane Gang

from the album The Bad and Lowdown World of the Kane Gang
- B-side: "Mighty Day"
- Released: 1984
- Genre: Sophisti-pop
- Length: 3:52
- Label: Kitchenware; London
- Songwriters: Martin Brammer; David Brewis
- Producer: Pete Wingfield

The Kane Gang singles chronology
"Small Town Creed" (1984)	"Closest Thing to Heaven" (1984)	"Respect Yourself" (1984)

"Closest Thing to Heaven" is a song by English pop band the Kane Gang, released in 1984 as the second single from their debut studio album, The Bad and Lowdown World of the Kane Gang (1985).

== Track listing and formats ==
- UK 7-inch single

A. "Closest Thing to Heaven" – 3:52
B. "Mighty Day" – 3:42

- UK 12-inch single

A. "Closest Thing to Heaven" – 5:02
B1. "Mighty Day" – 3:44
B2. "Bride of Smalltown Mudwrestles with Abbott & Costello in Outer Space" (3D Mad Mix 11 Creed) – 5:06

== Charts ==
Weekly chart performance for "Closest Thing to Heaven"
Chart (1984)	Peak position
Australia (Kent Music Report)	57
Belgium (Ultratop 50 Flanders)	22
Ireland (IRMA)	16
Netherlands (Single Top 100)	32
UK Singles (Official Charts)	12
