= I'll Take You There =

1972 single by The Staple Singers

- Side A of the US single

Single by the Staple Singers

from the album Be Altitude: Respect Yourself
- B-side: "I'm Just Another Soldier"
- Released: February 1972
- Genre: Funk; gospel; soul
- Length: 4:43; 3:16 (7" version)
- Label: Stax
- Songwriter: Al Bell
- Producer: Al Bell

The Staple Singers singles chronology
"Respect Yourself" (1971)	"I'll Take You There" (1972)	"This World" (1972)

"I'll Take You There" is a song written by Al Bell (using his full name Alvertis Isbell), and originally performed by American soul/gospel family band the Staple Singers. The Staple Singers version, produced by Bell, was released on Stax Records in February 1972, and spent a total of 15 weeks on the charts and reached number 1 on the US Billboard Hot 100. By December 1972, it had sold 2 million units and is ranked as the 19th biggest American hit of 1972. It remains one of the best-selling gospel songs of all time.

The song was also a significant chart hit in two later cover versions. A 1991 cover version by BeBe & CeCe Winans, with Mavis Staples featured as a guest artist, made it to number 1 on the R&B chart, and also reached number 90 on the Hot 100. In 1994, the British band General Public released a cover of "I'll Take You There" which peaked at number 22 on the Hot 100. Rap trio Salt-N-Pepa sampled "I'll Take You There" in their 1991 hit "Let's Talk About Sex". In 1997, the song was used by automobile manufacturer Chevrolet in its commercials for the revival of their Chevy Malibu.

== Original Staple Singers version ==
Included on the group's 1972 album Be Altitude: Respect Yourself, "I'll Take You There" features lead singer Mavis Staples inviting her listeners to seek Heaven. The song is almost completely a call-and-response chorus, with the introduction and bassline being lifted—uncredited—from "The Liquidator", a 1969 reggae hit written by Harry Johnson and performed by the Harry J Allstars. The entire song, written in the key of C, contains but two chords, C and F.

A large portion of the song is set aside for Mavis' sisters Cleotha and Yvonne and their father "Pops" to seemingly perform solos on their respective instruments. In actuality, these solos (and all music in the song) were recorded by the Muscle Shoals Rhythm Section. When Mavis Staples says "Daddy, now, Daddy, Daddy" (referring to "Pop's" guitar solo), it is actually Eddie Hinton who performs the solo on the record. Muscle Shoals Rhythm Section bass player David Hood performs the song's bassline. Terry Manning added harmonica and lead electric guitar. Roger Hawkins played drums, Barry Beckett was on Wurlitzer electronic piano, and Jimmy Johnson and Raymond Banks contributed guitar parts.

The horn and string parts were arranged by Detroit arranger Johnny Allen. The horns and strings were recorded at Artie Fields Recording Studios in Detroit Michigan. It was recorded in Sheffield, Alabama, at the famous Muscle Shoals Sound Studios, and overdubbed and mixed at Ardent Studios in Memphis by Engineer Terry Manning.

=== Reception ===
Rolling Stone editor David Fricke described this song as the "epitome of the Muscle Shoals Sound".

Bolstered by a "feel-good" vibe, "I'll Take You There" peaked at number 1 on the Billboard R&B Singles chart for four weeks May 1972. In June, "I'll Take You There" reached the top of the Billboard Hot 100 for one week. Billboard ranked it as the number 19 song for 1972. The song, ranked number 276 on the Rolling Stone list of the 500 Greatest Songs of All Time and inducted into the Grammy Hall of Fame in 1999, remains the most successful and recognizable single of the Staples' half-century-long career.

=== Personnel ===
Partial credits from Richard Buskin and Terry Manning.

The Staple Singers

- Mavis Staples – vocals
- Pops Staples – vocals
- Cleotha Staples – harmony and backing vocals
- Yvonne Staples – harmony and backing vocals

Muscle Shoals Rhythm Section

- Jimmy Johnson – guitar
- David Hood – bass
- Barry Beckett – keyboards, Wurlitzer electric piano
- Roger Hawkins – drums

Additional musicians

- Staple Sisters – harmony and backing vocals
- Terry Manning – lead guitar, guitars, fuzz guitar, Moog synthesizer, harmonica
- Eddie Hinton – lead guitar
- Raymond Banks – guitar
- The Memphis Horns (including Wayne Jackson and Andrew Love – horns (saxophones, trumpets, baritone saxophone, trombone)
- Ben Cauley – horns

Production and technical staff

- Al Bell – arranger, producer
- Johnny Allen – arranger
- Terry Manning – engineer, additional production (uncredited), additional arrangements (uncredited)
- Jerry Masters – engineer
- Ralph Rhodes – engineer

=== Charts ===
==== Weekly charts ====
Chart (1972)	Peak position
Canada Top Singles (RPM)	21
South Africa (Springbok)	7
UK Singles (Official Charts)	30
UK Soul (Disc)	2
US Billboard Hot 100	1
US R&B Songs (Billboard)	1
US Cash Box Top 100	1

==== Year-end charts ====
Chart (1972)	Position
US Billboard Hot 100	19
US Cash Box Top 100	22

=== Certifications ===
Region	Certification	Certified units/sales
New Zealand (RMNZ)	Gold	15,000^{‡}
United Kingdom (BPI)	Silver	200,000^{‡}
United States (RIAA)	Gold	500,000^{‡}
United States 1972 physical sales	—	1,500,000
^{‡} Sales+streaming figures based on certification alone.

== General Public version ==
"I'll Take You There"

Single by General Public
- B-side: Remix "Save It for Later" (live)
- Released: 1994
- Studio: Encore Studios; KROQ
- Genre: Pop; reggae; dancehall; house (remix)
- Length: 4:08
- Label: Epic
- Songwriter: Al Bell
- Producers: General Public; Ralph Sall; Tony Phillips

General Public singles chronology
"In Conversation" (1986)	"I'll Take You There" (1994)	"Rainy Days" (1995)

Music video
- "I'll Take You There" on YouTube

In 1994, British band General Public released a cover of "I'll Take You There" featured in the film Threesome, starring Lara Flynn Boyle, Stephen Baldwin and Josh Charles. The single features an added toasted verse specific to this rendition and was produced by the band with Ralph Sall and Tony Phillips. Released by Epic Records, it peaked at number 22 on the US Billboard Hot 100 and number 95 on its year-end chart. It also peaked at number 73 on the UK Singles Chart and number seven on the Canadian RPM Top Singles chart, ending up as number 38 on its year-end chart. Singer and guitarist Dave Wakeling told in a 1994 interview, "We figured the song would be used in the film for 30 seconds in the background while they were having a pillow fight or something, so we were pleased and a bit shocked and frightened when the label heard it and went, 'Whoa, that's it, we've got a single, we're making the video next week.' It's a lovely way to reintroduce our-selves and a terrific start with Epic."

=== Critical reception ===
Larry Flick from Billboard magazine wrote, "Alternative/dance duo that is best remembered for mid-'80s hits like 'Tenderness' shimmies back into the pop spotlight with a festive, dancehall-juiced rendition of the Staple Singers evergreen. Butt-shaggin' rhythms are matched by a playful but sturdy marriage of toasting and singing. Oh-so-engaging single has the potential to knock down more than a few doors at top 40, while hip-hop and house remixes should tell quite a story on the street." Alan Jones from Music Week gave it a score of three out of five, saying, "A decade after their self-titled single ["General Public" in 1984] was a minor success, General Public are ready for their first fully fledged hit, with this invigorating take on the Staple Singers hit." Pan-European magazine Music & Media noted in their review, that here "gospel has been moved to the background, while a trendy reggae beat is upfront."

=== Track listing ===
- 12-inc single, UK & Europe (1994)

A1. "I'll Take You There" (Sunshine Club Mix) — 8:20
A2. "I'll Take You There" (Satoshie Tomiie Experience) — 9:39
A3. "I'll Take You There" (Baby Says Huh ? Dub) — 5:14
B1. "I'll Take You There" (Sunday School Dub) — 5:24
B2. "I'll Take You There" (Private Version) — 10:00

- 12-inch single, US (1994)

A1. "I'll Take You There" (Extended 7" Mix) — 5:06
A2. "I'll Take You There" (Sunshine Club Mix) — 8:20
B1. "I'll Take You There" (Hoya Tribe Trip) — 9:55
B2. "I'll Take You There" (Baby Says Huh? Dub) — 5:14

- 12-inch maxi-single, Europe (1994)

A1. "I'll Take You There" (Extended 7" Mix) — 5:06
A2. "I'll Take You There" (Sunshine Club Mix) — 8:20
B1. "I'll Take You There" (Hoya Tribe Trip) — 9:55
B2. "I'll Take You There" (Baby Says Huh? Dub) — 5:14

- CD maxi-single, Europe (1994)
1. "I'll Take You There" (7" Version) — 4:08
2. "I'll Take You There" (Sunshine Radio Mix) — 4:30
3. "I'll Take You There" (Hoya Tribe Trip) — 9:55
4. "Save It For Later" (Live) — 5:05
- CD maxi-single, South Africa (1994)
1. "I'll Take You There" (7" Version) — 4:08
2. "I'll Take You There" (Sunshine Radio Mix) — 4:30
3. "I'll Take You There" (Hoya Tribe Trip) — 9:55
4. "I'll Take You There" (Baby Says Huh? Dub) — 5:14
5. "I'll Take You There" (Extended 7" Mix) — 5:06
6. "Save It For Later" (Live) — 5:05
- Cassette single, US (1994)

A. "I'll Take You There"
B. "Save It For Later" (Live)

=== Charts ===
==== Weekly charts ====
Chart (1994)	Peak position
Canada Top Singles (RPM)	7
Canada Dance/Urban (RPM)	9
Europe (European Dance Radio)	18
Europe (European Hit Radio)	28
Germany (GfK)	71
Iceland (Íslenski Listinn Topp 40)	20
New Zealand (Recorded Music NZ)	8
Quebec (ADISQ)	15
Scotland (OCC)	78
UK Singles (OCC)	73
UK Airplay (Music Week)	26
US Billboard Hot 100	22
US Alternative Songs (Billboard)	6
US Hot Dance Club Play (Billboard)	1
US Cash Box Top 100	12

==== Year-end charts ====
Chart (1994)	Position
Brazil (Crowley)	94
Canada Top Singles (RPM)	38
US Billboard Hot 100	95
US Hot Dance Club Play (Billboard)	10

== Other versions ==
In 1991, the song returned to number-one on the US R&B chart when it was covered by BeBe & CeCe Winans, with Mavis Staples featured as a guest artist on the track. The single also peaked at number 90 on the Hot 100 and number 11 on the Holland National Airplay chart.

In 2005, Sammy Hagar and The Waboritas released a cover titled "Let Me Take You There" as the first single from their 2006 album Livin' It Up!

== See also ==
- List of number-one R&B singles of 1972 (U.S.)
- List of Hot 100 number-one singles of 1972 (U.S.)
- List of number-one R&B singles of 1991 (U.S.)
- List of number-one dance singles of 1994 (U.S.)
