= Make Me Happy (song) =

1970 song by Bobby Bloom

Song by Bobby Bloom
- B-side: "This Thing I've Gotten Into"
- Released: 1970
- Length: 2:58
- Label: MGM K-14212
- Songwriter: Jeff Barry - Bobby Bloom
- Producer: Jeff Barry

Bobby Bloom singles chronology
"Montego Bay" (1970)	"Make Me Happy" (1970)	"Where Are We Going" (1971)

"Make Me Happy" is a song by Bobby Bloom, released on MGM in 1970. It was written by Bloom and Jeff Barry. It became a hit for Bloom in early 1971.

== Background ==
"Make Me Happy" was written by Jeff Barry and Bobby Bloom. It was backed with "This Thing I've Gotten Into". Barry also produced the record which was released on MGM K-14212 in 1970.

For the week of January 9, 1971, the single was in the pop section of the Cash Box Location Programming Guide as one of the top releases for coin phonographs.

== Reception ==
The single was reviewed by Billboard for the December 26 issue. A Top 20 Spotlight pick, the reviewer called it an infectious swinger.

The single was reviewed in the January 2, 1971 issue of Record World. The production and the beat of the record were noted with the reviewer calling it a "worthy successor to "Montego Bay".

== Airplay ==
For the week of January 23, the song was at no. 26 on the Cash Box Radio Active chart. It had also been added to the playlist of Radio KJR in Seattle in the previous week. It was also added to the playlists of WIFE in Indianapolis and WBAM in Montgomery, Alabama.

== Charts ==
"Make Me Happy" made its debut at no. 115 in the Record World 101-150 Singles Chart during the week of December 26, 1970. It debuted on the Record World singles chart two weeks later at no. 91 and peaked at no. 68 the week of February 27.

"Make Me Happy" made its chart debut at no. 100 in the Billboard Hot 100 chart for the week ending January 16, 1971, and peaked at no. 80 on February 20, 1971.

The single debuted on the Cash Box Top 100 chart at no. 85 for the week of January 23 and peaked at no. 78 on February 13.

As shown in the Billboard Hits of the World section of the April 17 issue, "Make Me Happy" had entered the Singapore Top Ten at no. 8.
