= The Return of Bruno (album) =

Studio album / soundtrack album by Bruce Willis
- Released: January 20, 1987
- Recorded: 1986
- Studios: Ocean Way Recording (Hollywood, California); Bill Schnee Studios and Weddington Studios (North Hollywood, California); Cherokee Studios and Image Recording Studios (Los Angeles, California)
- Genres: Blues; R&B; soul
- Length: 40:48
- Label: Motown
- Producer: Robert Kraft

Bruce Willis chronology
The Return of Bruno (1987)	If It Don't Kill You, It Just Makes You Stronger (1989)

Singles from The Return of Bruno
- 1. "Respect Yourself" Released: December 1986; 2. "Young Blood" Released: May 1987; 3. "Under the Boardwalk" Released: May 1987; 4. "Secret Agent Man" Released: September 1987; 5. "Comin' Right Up" Released: January 1988

The Return of Bruno is the debut album by the American actor Bruce Willis, singing as his fictional alter ego Bruno Radolini. Released by Motown Records in January 1987, the album shows Willis singing and playing harmonica on a collection of R&B classics plus some new songs. The album was promoted by the HBO special The Return of Bruno which aired shortly after the album's release. A re-issue was distributed by Razor & Tie in 1997.

The album was preceded in December 1986 by the lead single "Respect Yourself" which hit number 5 on the Billboard Hot 100. Willis is backed on the song by the Pointer Sisters who deliver a rendition faithful to the original 1971 soul hit by the Staple Singers. "Respect Yourself" was the only single from the album that received significant US airplay.

The Return of Bruno received mixed reviews. Many fans of Willis's acting career were dissatisfied with their purchase of the album.

== Overview ==
The album peaked at number 14 on the US Billboard 200. In the United Kingdom, the album peaked at number 4 on the UK Albums Chart. Willis was awarded a US Gold album in March 1987.

The lead single "Respect Yourself" reached number 5 on the Billboard Hot 100, number 7 on the UK Singles Chart, and number 8 on the Canadian RPM Top Singles chart. A music video was made depicting Willis as a bartender playing a harmonica, featuring June Pointer singing and dancing, backed by a male doo-wop group. Willis promoted the song by performing it with the Pointer Sisters on their television special The Pointer Sisters – Up All Nite which was broadcast on January 23, 1987. In the storyline, the sisters encounter him playing the harmonica in the Palomino nightclub in North Hollywood, and they join him on stage.

The follow-up singles "Young Blood" and "Under the Boardwalk" did not fare nearly as well, peaking at number 68 and number 59 in the US. "Under the Boardwalk" reached number 2 in the UK charts and became the UK's 12th best-selling single of 1987. Other singles were released in the UK, including "Secret Agent Man" (number 43) and "Comin' Right Up" (number 73).

A TV special (and home video release), titled The Return of Bruno, was released at the same time. It was produced as a "mockumentary" purporting to chronicle the career of Bruno Radolini (Willis). It was directed by Jim Yukich and produced by Paul Flattery for their company, Split Screen. It was nominated for a CableACE Award for writing.

== Reception and legacy ==
Professional ratings
Review scores
Source	Rating
AllMusic	3/5 stars

Reviews of the album were mixed. In February 1987, People magazine gave the album a B+, calling Willis' cover of "Under the Boardwalk" "surprisingly okay", also noting that the album "shows us that he (Willis) can't shout songs quite as well as Don Johnson. So Springsteen he ain't. Funny he is." In a retrospective review, AllMusic observed that Willis was a better singer than his Moonlighting co-star Cybill Shepard, but "doesn't quite have the conviction or skill of the Blues Brothers", adding that The Return of Bruno is today little more than a kitsch artifact.

== Track listing ==
1. "Comin' Right Up" (Brock Walsh) – 3:29
2. "Respect Yourself" (Luther Ingram, Mack Rice) (originally by the Staple Singers) – 3:53
3. "Down in Hollywood" (Ry Cooder, Tim Drummond) (originally by Ry Cooder) – 5:19
4. "Young Blood" (Jerry Leiber, Doc Pomus, Mike Stoller) (originally by the Coasters) – 4:08
5. "Under the Boardwalk" (Kenny Young, Arthur Resnick) (originally by the Drifters) – 3:03
6. "Secret Agent Man / James Bond Is Back" (Steve Barri, P.F. Sloan) / (John Barry) – 4:46
7. "Jackpot (Bruno's Bop)" (Robert Kraft, Bruce Willis) – 4:11
8. "Fun Time" (Allen Toussaint) (originally by Joe Cocker) – 3:36
9. "Lose Myself" (Larry John McNally, Jon Lind) – 3:56
10. "Flirting with Disaster" (Brock Walsh, Jeff Lorber) – 4:27

== Personnel ==
The album liner notes do not list the Pointer Sisters' vocals on track 2. Their contribution is confirmed by Tidal.

- Bruce Willis – lead vocals, harmonica, arrangements (7)
- Alan Pasqua – keyboards (1, 3, 6, 9)
- Steve Thoma – keyboards (1–4, 7–9), arrangements (2–4, 7, 8), backing vocals (4)
- Michael Boddicker – keyboards (2)
- Greg Phillinganes – keyboards (2)
- Booker T. Jones – Hammond organ (6)
- Jeff Lorber – keyboards (10), drum programming (10)
- Danny Grenier – guitars (1–4, 7–9), arrangements (2–4, 7, 8), backing vocals (3, 4)
- Duane Sciacqua – guitars (1–4, 7–9), arrangements (2–4, 7, 8), backing vocals (4)
- James Harrah – guitars (5)
- Dann Huff – guitars (6, 10)
- Buzz Feiten – guitars (9)
- Dave Chamberlain – bass (1–4, 7–9), arrangements (2–4, 7, 8), backing vocals (3)
- Jeff Steele – bass (2)
- Neil Stubenhaus – bass (5, 6)
- Marty Fera – drums (1–4, 7–9), arrangements (2–4, 7, 8)
- Rick Marotta – drums (6)
- Wendel D'Howell Jr. – drums (10)
- Michael Fisher – percussion (1–3, 5, 6, 8, 9)
- Chris Mostert – saxophones (1–4, 7–9), arrangements (2–4, 7, 8)
- Greg Smith – saxophones (1–4, 7–9), arrangements (2–4, 7, 8)
- Joel Peskin – saxophone (6)
- Gary Grant – trumpet (1, 2)
- Jerry Hey – trumpet (1, 2), brass arrangements (1, 2)
- Ken Johnson – SFX (5)
- George Budd – SFX (6)
- Brock Walsh – rhythm arrangements (1), drum programming (10), backing vocals (10)
- Robert Kraft – arrangements (2, 5–7), SFX (5), backing vocals (6)
- Hoogie D'Howell – string arrangements (5)
- Lynn Davis – backing vocals (1, 3, 8, 10)
- Siedah Garrett – backing vocals (1, 3, 8, 10)
- The Pointer Sisters – vocals (2)
- Phillip Ingram – backing vocals (3, 6, 8, 10)
- Daryl Phinnessee – backing vocals (3, 6, 8)
- Rob Trow – backing vocals (3, 6, 8, 9)
- The Temptations – backing vocals (5)
- Rita Bitar – backing vocals (6)
- Bruce Di Mattia – backing vocals (6)
- Shari Dub – backing vocals (6)
- Alexis England – backing vocals (6)
- Jan Gorman – backing vocals (6)
- Jolie Levine – backing vocals (6)
- John Vigran – backing vocals (6)
- Tim Stone – backing vocals (8, 9)
- Jon Lind – backing vocals (9)
- Harry Mulvey – backing vocals (9)

=== Production ===
- Robert Kraft – producer
- John Vigran – recording
- David Lazerus – mixing
- Ron DaSilva – assistant engineer
- David Eaton – assistant engineer
- Dan Garcia – assistant engineer
- Cliff Kane – assistant engineer
- Julie Last – assistant engineer
- Mike Ross – assistant engineer
- David Benson – technical assistant
- Bernie Grundman – mastering at Bernie Grundman Mastering (Hollywood, California)
- Jan Gorman – production assistant
- Jolie Levine – production coordinator
- Bob Hart – project management
- Chip Rachlin – project management
- Johnny Lee – art direction
- Andy Engel – design
- David Alexander – photography

== Certifications ==
Certifications for The Return of Bruno
Region	Certification	Certified units/sales
Canada (Music Canada)	Platinum	100,000^{^}
United Kingdom (BPI)	Gold	100,000^{^}
United States (RIAA)	Gold	500,000^{^}
^{^} Shipments figures based on certification alone.
