= Eddie Hinton =

American songwriter (1944–1995)

Eddie Hinton (15 June 1944 – 28 July 1995) was an American songwriter and session musician, best known for his work with soul music and R&B singers. He played lead guitar for Muscle Shoals Rhythm Section from 1969 to 1971 and after leaving the band, he was replaced by Pete Carr as lead guitarist.

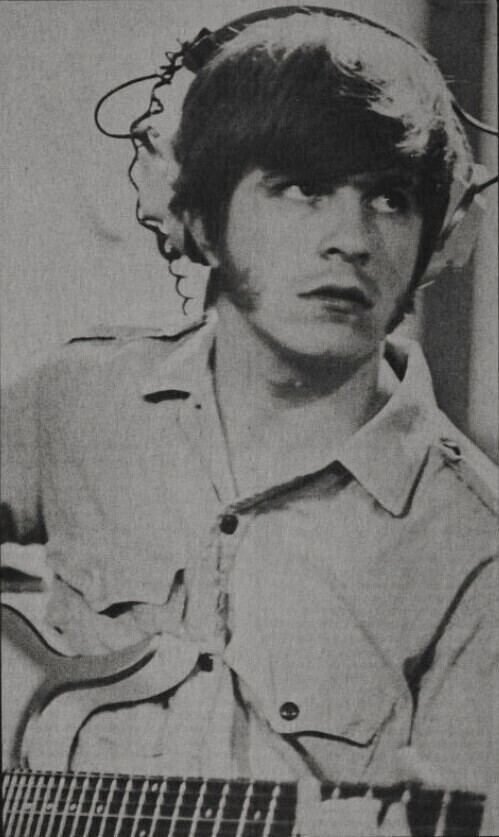
Hinton playing a Danelectro longhorn guitar c. 1970

== Career ==
Hinton was born in Jacksonville, Florida, on June 15, 1944, to Laura Deanie and Horton C. Hinton. Hinton's parents divorced in 1949, and he and his mother moved to Tuscaloosa, Alabama, where his mother later remarried.

He formed the Five Minutes, also known as Five Men-Its, who quickly garnered regional recognition. Two of the members of the group, drummer Johnny Sandlin and keyboardist Paul Hornsby, would join Duane and Gregg Allman in the Hour Glass and later go on to success as record producers. Hinton, Sandlin and Hornsby all spent time working as session players in Muscle Shoals. Hornsby and Sandlin worked at Rick Hall's FAME Studios (Florence Alabama Music Enterprises) and from there went to Capricorn Records in Macon, Ga. Hinton had joined some former FAME players known as the Muscle Shoals Rhythm Section (or "the Swampers") who split off from Hall and started their own studio, Muscle Shoals Sound, in Sheffield. Hinton was replaced at MSS by Wayne Perkins.

As a session guitarist in Muscle Shoals, Hinton played on hit records recorded by Wilson Pickett, Arthur Conley, Aretha Franklin, Joe Tex, Solomon Burke, Percy Sledge, The Staple Singers, The Dells, Bonnie Bramlett, Paul Kelly, Johnny Taylor, The Box Tops, R. B. Greaves, Boz Scaggs, Evie Sands, Looking Glass, Toots Hibbert and Otis Redding.

Hinton was a songwriter in his own right as well. His most well known song is "Breakfast in Bed" which has been recorded many times, most notably by Dusty Springfield and by UB40 with Chrissie Hynde. He also co-wrote "It's All Wrong But It's All Right" sung by Laura Lee. Willy Deville recorded his song "Help Me To Make It (Power of a Woman's Love)" on his album Coup de Grâce.

The song "Sandwiches for the Road" by fellow Alabamians Drive-By Truckers is based on the life of Hinton. It appears on their 1998 debut LP, Gangstabilly.

A documentary of the life and musical career of Hinton called Dangerous Highway was made by New Mexico Filmmakers Deryle Perryman and Moises Gonzalez. Narrated by bluesman Robert Cray, it screened in film festivals across the US and made its European premiere at the 2008 Porretta Soul Festival in Porretta, Italy.

Hinton was the grandson of a preacher and used his gospel influences to weave stories of pain and redemption. He died at his home in Birmingham, Alabama from a heart attack at age 51.

== Dangerous Highway ==
Beginning in 2009, Shake It Records based in Cincinnati, Ohio, began releasing entries from their series Dangerous Highway: A Tribute to the Music of Eddie Hinton. This series featured cover versions of Hinton's songs by artists who were inspired by and continue his legacy. Volumes one and two were released in 2009.

Volume 1 – Greg Dulli
Side A – "Hard Luck Guy"; Side B – "Cover Me"

Volume 2 – Drive-By Truckers
Side A – "Where's Eddie?"; Side B – "Everybody Needs Love"

Volume 3 – Heartless Bastards and Wussy
Side A – "Got Down Last Saturday Night" – Heartless Bastards; Side B – "Breakfast in Bed" – Wussy

Volume 4 – Buffalo Killers
Side A – "Heavy Makes You Happy"; Side B – "Still Water Runs Deep"

== Discography ==
- Very Extremely Dangerous (1978) Muscle Shoals Sound Studio
- Letters From Mississippi (1987) Birdland Recording Studio
- Cry & Moan (1991) Duck Tape Studio
- Very Blue Highway (1993) Birdland Recording Studio
- Hard Luck Guy (1999) Birdland & Duck Tape Recording Studios

== As songwriter ==
- Breakfast in Bed, Dusty Springfield and UB40 with Chrissie Hynde
- Down in Texas, Oscar Tony Jr.
- Cover Me, Jackie Moore
- A Little Bit Salty, Bobby Womack
- Sure as Sin, Candi Staton
- 300 Pounds of Hongry, Tony Joe White
- Masquerade, Don Varner
- Always David, The Sweet Inspirations
- Help Me Make It, Mink DeVille
- Save the Children, Cher
- Every Natural Thing, Aretha Franklin
- If I Had Let You In, The Box Tops

== Session works ==
- Session work with John P. Hammond appears on the re-release of So Many Roads
- Breakfast in Bed, Dusty Springfield and UB40 with Chrissie Hynde
- Down in Texas, Oscar Tony Jr.
- Cover Me, Jackie Moore
- A Little Bit Salty, Bobby Womack
- Sure as Sin, Candi Staton
- 300 Pounds of Hongry, Tony Joe White

== See also ==
- Muscle Shoals Rhythm Section
- Rick Hall
- Muscle Shoals, Alabama
