= John Linde =

American music producer

- Born: Oceanside, New York, U.S.
- Genres: Various
- Occupations: Music executive, music producer, composer
- Years active: 1959–2000s
- Member of: The Chants

John Linde is an American music producer. Musically, he has been involved in genres which include, doo-wop, r&b, soul, pop, and heavy rock. As a producer, his work includes the albums The Beat Goes On for Vanilla Fudge, Sir Lord Baltimore by Sir Lord Baltimore, and A Mouth in The Clouds for The Group Image. He produced the singles, "Where Are We Going" by Bobby Bloom, "A Touch of Baby" for The Tymes, "The Letter" for The Outrage and others. He has also composed hits for Peter Antell, The Percells and Bobby Bloom.

== Background ==
John Linde was born in Oceanside, New York. He also grew up there. While attending high school, he was a percussionist in the school's band.

After leaving school he formed The Chants in 1959. He had a dual role as the band's drummer as well as their manager. The group was made up of Pete Antell on guitar and vocals, Bobby Butts on sax and vocals, Mike DeVivo on lead vocals, John Linde on drums and Mickey Lee Lane on bass. Between 1961 and 1962, the group recorded three singles. The first, "Respectable" bw "Kiss Me Goodbye" was released on Tru Eko 3567 in 1961. It was also released on MGM 13008 the same year. And in the same year, "Dick Tracy" bw "Choo Choo" was released. The following year, "Respectable" was released on U.W.R. 4243.

He would go on to produce recordings for the New York Rock & Roll Ensemble, Mickey Lee Lane, the Purcells and more. He would also take on the role of vice president for the Hempstead, New York located Community Records Inc., and in 1969, was a founder of Hand Music, Ltd. With him were Jack Rieley and Russ Mackie. They were located at 2 Pennsylvania Plaza, Suite 1500, New York, N.Y. 10001.

== Career ==
=== 1960s ===
Linde and Peter Antell wrote the song, "Night Time" for Antell. Released in 1962, it made it to no. 100 in the US.

Linde and Peter Antell wrote the song, "What Are Boys Made Of" which was recorded by The Percells. It made it to no. 53 in the US in 1963.

Linde, Bobby Bloom and Billy Jackson produced the Thom Bell composition, "A Touch of Baby" for The Tymes, which was released on MGM K13631 in 1966. Also that year they composed and produced both sides to a Bobby Mann single, "Make the Radio a Little Louder" / "Heart of Town", which was released on Kama Sutra KA 210. It was a Top 60 prediction on the Billboard HOT 100 Chart. Bobby Mann was actually a pseudonym of Bobby Bloom. An English group, The Ways and Means who were managed and produced by Ron Fairway recorded it as B side to their single, "Sea of Faces" which was released later that year.

Linde co-wrote and co-produced Bobby Bloom's 1967 single, "Love, Don't Let Me Down" which was released on Kama Sutra KA 223. In April that year, it got to no. 8 on the Record World Singles Coming Up chart, and no. 30 on the Cash Box Looking Ahead chart.

It was reported by Record World in the October 4, 1969, issue that new record label, Hand Records had entered into a five-year deal with Tower Records for worldwide distribution of Hand label releases. The label was headed by president Jack Rieley. Linde the vice president was also head of A&R. Linde announced that they had recently signed the King Biscuit Blues Band, a top blues group from the East Coast who were about to have an album produced. Peter Antell had also been signed. According to Linde, Hand Records been in negotiations for Infinity Productions' to purchase the master for Dogood's Life Mobile's recording, "Baby Doll" and the negotiations had just been completed. The recording was due for release in a couple of weeks.

=== 1970s ===
Linde co-wrote the song "Where Are We Going" for Bobby Bloom. The song spent four weeks in the chart, peaking at no. 84 on the week ending, January 30, 1971. Also that year he produced and arranged the Sir Lord Baltimore album by Sir Lord Baltimore which was released on Mercury SRM 1–613.

Linde would work closely with a five-member rock group from New London, Conn. called Baxter. He was pictured with the group in the February 3, 1973, issue of Cash Box. In early 1973, Billboard noted that the Hempstead, New York based Ultra-Sonic Studios who had facilitated the recordings for Vanilla Fudge, had now launched their own music publishing arm. John Linde was named as head of the company. The first copyrights were for the group Baxter who had already recorded a yet to be released album at the facility. Linde produced the single, "Give it All" for Baxter which was released on Paramount 0194 in March that year.
