= Sign of the V =

Song by Bobby Bloom
- A-side: "Sign of the V"
- B-side: "Heidi"
- Released: 1969
- Length: 3:47
- Label: Earth Records E-106
- Composer: J. Barry - J. Levine - K. Resnick - J. Carroll
- Producer: Jeff Barry

Sign of the V was an anti-war song for American singer-songwriter Bobby Bloom. It was a hit for him in 1969.

== Background ==
"Sign of the V" backed with "Heidi" was released on the New York -based label, Earth (cat# 106) in 1969. An article in the 22 November, 1969 issue of Record World had Bobby Bloom pictured with his producer Jeff Barry. The article also explained that the Earth record label was a division of Transcontinental Entertainment Corporation which under the umbrella org T.I.C.. Harold Berkman, Joey Levine and Artie Resnick were the org's heads. It was also reported that the record was scheduled for immediate release.

Prior to the release of the single, Bobby Bloom was a producer and artist with the Kama Sutra record label. This was Bloom's first single for Earth Records.

In an article about Jeff Barry in the December 6 issue of Record World, it was noted that Bobby Bloom's single, "Sign of the V" and his album were due for release. The single was written by Joey Levine, Chris Resnick, Bobby Bloom and Jim Carroll. Barry produced it.

"Sign of the V" is a peace song and draws from the peace sign used at the Woodstock festival.

== Reception ==
Betty Breneman of the Money Music section in the 22 November issue of Record World called the song great. The record was reviewed by Cash Box in the magazine's December 13 issue. Referring to Bloom's vocals and the arrangements as "standout", the reviewer noted the potential to explode into AM and FM. The production with the teen appeal was catch on fire in the Top 40. It is included on the Next Stop Is Vietnam The War on Record: 1961–2008 compilation.

According to Jeff Barry, this song is the best of the Bobby Bloom songs that he produced.

== Charts ==
The single was one of the four Sleeper Picks of the Week by Record World in the 13 December issue.

The single entered the Record World Singles Coming Up chart at no. 17 on 27 December, 1969. The single reached its peak position of no. 10 on the week of January 24. It stayed in the chart until 21 February with its last position being 47. No further charting was available due to the magazine excluding the chart for the next two issues.
