= Sea of Faces (song) =

Song by The Ways and Means
- A-side: "Sea of Faces"
- B-side: "Make the Radio a Little Louder"
- Released: 1966
- Label: Pye 7N 17277
- Composer(s): Parker, Fowley
- Producer(s): Ron Fairway

UK chronology
"Little Deuce Coupe" (1966)	"Sea of Faces" (1966)	"Breaking Up A Dream" (1968)

Sea of Faces was a 1966 single of English group The Ways and Means. Composed by Brian Parker and Kim Fowley, it became a hit for the group in early 1967.

== Background ==
"Sea of Faces" was written by Brian Parker and Kim Fowley. It was intended for the UK group, Unit Four Plus Two. At the time the song was being written, Fowley was living in England with P.J. Proby. Unit Four Plus Two did record the song but it was never released.

Later, it was recorded by The Ways and Means who were managed by producer Ron Fairway, who would be a one-time manager of The Foundations. Backed with the Bobby Bloom, John Linde composition, "Make the Radio a Little Louder", it was released on Pye 7N 17277. It was also released in a picture cover format in Denmark. This was the follow up to their previous single, a Beach Boys cover, "Little Deuce Coupe" bw "The Little Old Lady From Pasadena" which was released on Columbia in 1966.

Ron Fairway put them on a radio show to promote the single. The group also did a promotion for the song at the Tiles club in Oxford Street with Jimi Hendrix who had just released "Hey Joe". The band were actually friends with Noel Redding as well.

Along with the singles, "I Don't Need Anything" by Sandie Shaw, "Sugar Town" by Nancy Sinatra, "Talk Talk" by The Music Machine and "Rosie" by Max Bygraves and Kenny Ball, "Sea of Faces" was noted as one of the Pye Records chart climbers by Disc and Music Echo in the magazine's January 14 issue.

The song brought them a degree of success when it became a minor hit for them in January 1967.

It's possible that the follow up to "Sea of Faces" could have been "Baby, Now That I've Found You". They were offered the song by Tony Macaulay but they felt that it wasn't for them. The Foundations recorded it with Clem Curtis on vocals and the song went to no. 1. They would later regret not taking up the offer.

Their follow up was Breaking Up a Dream" which was released on Barry Class' Trend Label.

Years later, the song was described by AllMusic reviewer Bruce Eder as "beautifully ornate and crunchy".

== Charts ==
"Sea of Faces" made its debut on the Radio City City Sixty chart for the Sunday 25 December 1966 to Sunday 1 January 1967 period. It peaked at No. 39 for the Sunday 1st to Sunday 8 January 1967 period.

On the Radio Caroline Countdown Of Sound chart, it made its debut at no. 50 on the week of Saturday, January 7, 1967 It had moved up no. 44 on the week of Saturday, January 14, 1967. On its third week in the chart, it peaked at no. 41 on the week of Saturday 21 January.

It also debuted at no. 27 on the Radio London Fab Forty chart on the week of January 1, 1967. It held that position for another week before disappearing off the chart by Jan 21.

Chart (1967)	Peak position
Radio City City Sixty	39
Radio Caroline Countdown Of Sound	41
Radio London Fab Forty	27

== Releases ==
Singles
Act	Release	Catalogue	Year	Notes
Ways & Means	"Sea of Faces" / "Make the Radio a Little Louder"	Pye 7N 17217	1966	Yellow label promo
Ways & Means	"Sea of Faces" / "Make the Radio a Little Louder"	Pye 7N 17217	1966	Red label stock
Ways & Means	" Sea Of Faces" / "Make the Radio a Little Louder"	Pye 7N 17217	1966	Denmark picture cover stock release

Various artist compilation appearances
Title	Catalogue	Year	Notes
Butterfly: Ripples, Volume 8	Castle Music, CMRCD 554	2002 / 2003	
Psychedelic Britain: Fuzz and Flowers	Dockland Music 406514 2015899	2023	
