= Bobby Bloom =

American singer-songwriter (1946–1974)

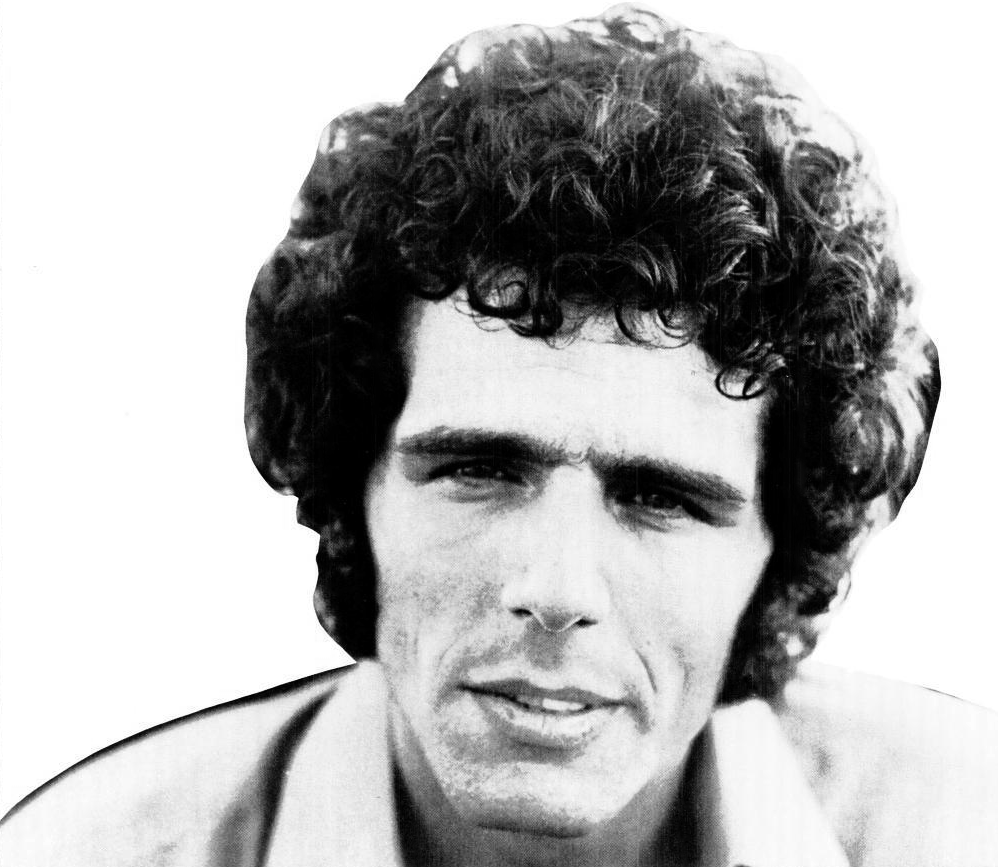
- Bloom in 1970
- Born: Robert Bloom; January 15, 1946; New York City, U.S.
- Died: February 28, 1974 (aged 28); Los Angeles, California, U.S.
- Musical career
- Genres: Pop; calypso; rock
- Occupations: Musician; singer-songwriter
- Instrument: Vocals
- Years active: Early 1960s–1974
- Labels: Polydor; Buddah; Kama Sutra; L&R

Robert Bloom (January 15, 1946 – February 28, 1974) was an American singer-songwriter. He is known best for the upbeat 1970 hit, "Montego Bay", which was co-written with and produced by Jeff Barry.

== Background ==
Bloom was born in 1946 in Brooklyn, NY. In the early 1960s, Bloom had been a member of the doo-wop group, The Imaginations. He received a big break in 1969 when he was awarded a contract to write and record a jingle for Pepsi, paving the way for his later success with "Montego Bay". He also played a role as a songwriter for the Kama Sutra/Buddah group of labels, co-writing "Mony Mony" for Tommy James and the Shondells and, with Jeff Barry, "Sunshine" for The Archies. Bloom co-wrote songs with Jeff Barry and Neil Goldberg for the Monkees' album Changes and their 1971 single "Do It in the Name of Love". He often recorded demos of his songs at the recording studio of MAP City Records, owned by friends Peter Anders and Vincent "Vini" Poncia Jr., with chief engineer Peter H. Rosen at the controls.

The recordings that followed his success with "Montego Bay" in 1970, "Heavy Makes You Happy", which became a hit for the Staple Singers in 1971, "Where Are We Going" and The Bobby Bloom Album all used the same combination of pop, calypso, and rock.

== Career ==
=== 1960s ===
By October, 1965, Bloom's single, "I Still Remember" bw "Rough And Tough" was released on Kapp K-710. According to Cash Box, this was one of the records due for release in Holland that Hans I. Kellerman was very enthusiastic about.

Under the pseudonym of Bobby Mann, he recorded the song, "Make the Radio a Little Louder". Backed with "Heart of Town", it was released on Kama Sutra KA 210. With the production credited to Bloom and Linde, it was in the Billboard Spotlight Singles section for the week ending June 4, 1966. It was predicted to reach the top 60 of the Billboard Chart. It was covered by English group The Ways and Means who were managed and produced by Ron Fairway. It was the B side to their single, "Sea of Faces" which was released later that year.

The single "Count on Me" / Was I Dreamin' was released on Kama Sutra 229 in mid-1967. It was given a four-star rating by Record World with the review saying that it could be counted on to pull in many sales. With the song being called strong, Bloom's strong voice was also noted. It was also noted in the R&B Beat section of Record World in the June 3 issue of Record World that "Count on Me" was about to break according to Fat Daddy in Baltimore.

It was reported in the March 25 issue of Record World that Bobby Bloom's label Kama Sutra was pushing for Bloom's Latest single, "Love, Don't Let Me Down" to be a hit. According to Johnny Davis an exec. for the label, there was a great national reaction to the record. It was also one of the picks at WDRC. It was reported in the April 8 issue of Record World that the single had been picked up by some of the top r&b stations. It had also been picked up by twelve major pop stations. It had also debuted in the Record World Singles Coming Up chart at no. 10.

Bloom and Marty Kupersmith composed the song " You Bring Me to My Knees". Producer Gary Katz was a friend of theirs and as a result the song was brought to Eric Mercury. It was included on Mercury's 1969 album, Electric Black Man. Two other Bloom compositions would be included on the album. One was a sole Bloom composition, "Life Style" and the other, "Again N' Again" was co-written with Linde.

It was reported by Record World in the November 22, 1969 issue that Jeff Barry had produced Bloom's first single "The Sign of the V" for the Earth Label. The single was written by Barry, Barry, Jim Carroll, Joey Levine and Kris Resnick. The song which took its theme from the Woodstock Rock Festival was one of the four Sleeper Picks Of The Week by Record World in the December 13 issue.

=== 1970s ===
In 1970, he had his big hit with "Montego Bay" which got to no. 8 in the US and no. 3 in the UK. His self-titled album entered the Cash Box Top 100 Albums chart at no. 99 on the week of December 5.

On December 7, 1970, Bloom appeared at the Whisky A Go Go in Los Angeles appearing in front of a large crowd. He was on the same bill as a group called Fat Chance. He was backed with a band which included 2 guitars, bass, congas, keyboards and three black female singers. Elliot Teigel of Billboard gave his performance a good review. Tiegel said Bloom he possessed a strong emotion packed voice, but he needed to develop stage presence and movements to go with his strong voice which he likened to a Ray Charles and Bill Medley sound on the fast numbers. He also mentioned a similarity with Neil Diamond when Bloom sang on the slower songs. Rod Baron also noted a similar thing about Bloom's performance. He also said that the female back-up singers needed to rehearse more. He also said that MGM was possibly recording the event for a live LP that would have more than interesting results.

Cash Box reported that Bloom had appeared on the David Frost Show to sing "Montego Bay". After his performance he got together with Frost for a talk and to be photographed.

It was reported by Cash Box in the 19 December 1970 issue that some of Bloom's tapes had been acquired by the Roulette label. From those tapes, the first single "Where Are We Going" was due for immediate release. Sonny Kirkshen, who at the time was vice-president for the label's sales and marketing division said that there was the possibility of a Bobby Bloom album in the near future. "Where Are We Going" was in the Picks of the Week section of the 19 December issue of Cash Box. The reviewer referred to it as a "teen outing" and said that it should capture the Top 40 ear and that it would benefit Bloom's status. It was also reviewed in the December 19 issue of Billboard. Taking into account Bloom's current hit status with "Montego Bay", the reviewer called it a potent rocker and said gave it Hot 100 potential. On January 30, 1971, the song peaked at no. 84 on the Billboard Hot 100.

Bloom had a UK hit with "Heavy Makes You Happy". It was released in the UK on Polydor 2001-122 in 1970. It spent a total of five weeks in the UK charts, peaking at no. 31 on January 31.

Working with Neil Goldberg, Bloom wrote "Do It in the Name of Love" which was recorded by The Monkees. Produced by Jeff Barry, the single was released on the Bell label. A Billboard Top 60 Spotlight for the week of 24 April 1971, the reviewer called it a solid rocker that was loaded with Top 40 potency and could go all the way. His single "We're All Goin' Home" was also reviewed in the same issue. The reviewer wrote that it was one of the best produced, performed entries of the week and that it had a potent rhythm. An impact in sales prediction was also made.

Bobby Bloom appeared on American Bandstand with The Staple Singers. The songs performed by The Staple Singers were, "Heavy Makes You Happy", "You've Got to Earn It". Bloom performed "We're All Goin' Home". The show was aired on May 15, 1971. "We're All Goin' Home" made its debut at no. 112 in the Bubbling Under The HOT 100 chart on the week of June 19, 1971. It was still at the same position the following week. The following week on June 26, it made its debut at 95 in the Billboard Hot 100. On its third week in the chart, it peaked at no. 93 for the week ending July 10.

Later that year, Bloom released the single "We Need Each Other" which he co-wrote with Jeff Barry. Backed with "You Touch Me", it was released on MGM. Reviewed in the September 11 issue of Record World, the reviewer speculated that it could be Bloom's big follow up to "Montego Bay".

His single, "Sha La Boom Boom" was released in 1972. Released on MGM 14437, Billboard had it as a recommended single in the December 16 issue. It debuted at no. 123 in the Billboard US Hot 100 Bubbling Under chart for the week of February 17, 1973. It peaked there and stayed in the chart for a total of three weeks.

Bloom's single, "We Need Each Other" / "Make Me Happy" that was released in Brazil on MGM 2006 176 in 1972 had made the charts in Brazil. On the week of February 17, 1972, Billboard had recorded its progress on the Rio De Jeneiro chart at no. 14.

== Death ==
Towards the end of his life, Bloom struggled with depression. He allegedly died in an accidental shooting while cleaning his gun at his home in Hollywood on February 28, 1974, at the age of 28.

Bloom's family did not believe he would have shot himself, and the investigation never followed up on leads. Jeff Barry learned later he was the sole beneficiary of Bloom's life insurance policy. In a 1995 interview, Barry claimed that Bloom was shot by another man in a fight over a woman.

== Discography ==
=== Albums ===
- 1970: The Bobby Bloom Album (L&R Records) LR-1035, (MGM Records) LR-1035 (US No. 126)
- 1971: Where Are We Going (Buddah) BDS 5072

=== Singles ===
Year	Title	Label	Peak chart positions				
Year	Title	Label	US	US AC	US CB	AUS	UK
1965	"I Still Remember"	Kapp	―	―	―	―	―
1967	"Love, Don't Let Me Down"	Kama Sutra	―	―	130	―	―
1967	"Count On Me"	Kama Sutra	―	―	―	―	―
1968	"All I Wanna Do Is Dance"	White Whale	―	―	―	―	―
1969	"Jill"	Buddah	―	―	―	―	―
1969	"Turn On"	Buddah	―	―	―	―	―
1969	"Sign of the V"	Earth	―	―	―	―	―
1970	"Montego Bay"	L&R	8	18	6	9	3
1970	"Make Me Happy"	MGM	80	―	78	―	―
1971	"Where Are We Going"	Roulette	84	―	97	―	―
1971	"Heavy Makes You Happy"	MGM	―	―	―	―	31
1971	"We're All Goin' Home"	MGM	93	―	105	―	―
1971	"We Need Each Other"	MGM	―	―	―	―	―
1971	"(It's) Emergency"	Map City	―	―	―	―	―
1972	"I Really Got It Bad for You"	MGM	―	―	―	―	―
1972	"Sha La Boom Boom"	MGM	123	―	100	―	―
1973	"Island"	MGM	―	―	―	―	―
"—" denotes releases that did not chart or were not released in that territory.

== See also ==
- List of 1970s one-hit wonders in the United States
