= If You're Ready (Come Go with Me) =

Single by the Staple Singers

from the album Be What You Are
- B-side: "Love Comes in All Colors"
- Released: October 1973
- Genre: Soul
- Length: 4:29 (album version); 3:20 (single version)
- Label: Stax
- Songwriters: Homer Banks, Carl Hampton, Ray Jackson

The Staple Singers singles chronology
"Be What You Are" (1973)	"If You're Ready (Come Go with Me)" (1973)	"Touch a Hand, Make a Friend" (1974)

"If You're Ready (Come Go with Me)" is a song by the Staple Singers. Released from their album Be What You Are, the single spent three weeks at number one on the Billboard magazine's Hot Soul Singles chart in 1973. It peaked at number nine on the Billboard Hot 100 pop singles chart. It became a gold record.

The arrangement, tempo, cadence, and melody reflect more constant uptempo than the group's 1972 number 1 hit "I'll Take You There".

== Chart history ==
Chart (1973–1974)	Peak position
Canada	79
UK Singles (OCC)	34
U.S. Billboard Hot 100	9
U.S. Billboard Hot Soul Singles	1

== Other versions ==
- In 1985, British Jamaican singer Ruby Turner covered this song featuring South African singer-songwriter and guitarist Jonathan Butler. Her version reached #30 in the UK, #29 in Ireland and number three in New Zealand.
- In 1987, American Contemporary Christian singer Steve Archer covered this song for his fourth solo album Off the Page.
- In 1991, Australian singler Wendy Matthews covered it on her live album, The Way It Has to Be
