= Montego Bay (song) =

1970 single by Bobby Bloom

Single by Bobby Bloom

from the album The Bobby Bloom Album
- B-side: "Try a Little Harder"
- Released: September 1970
- Genre: Bubblegum pop
- Length: 2:53
- Label: L&R Records
- Songwriters: Jeff Barry, Bobby Bloom
- Producer: Jeff Barry

Bobby Bloom singles chronology
"Sign of the V" (1969)	"Montego Bay" (1970)	"Make Me Happy" (1970)

Music video
- Bobby Bloom – Montego Bay • TopPop on YouTube

"Montego Bay" is a song co-written and performed by Bobby Bloom about the city in Jamaica of the same name. The song was a top ten hit for Bloom in the Fall of 1970 on both sides of the Atlantic. It reached No. 3 on the UK Singles Chart, No. 5 on the Canadian RPM 100 Singles Chart, No. 7 on the Australian Go-Set Singles Chart and No. 8 on the US Billboard Hot 100. The song was co-written and produced by Jeff Barry. In the master tape of the song, Bloom breaks into a chorus of "Oh, What a Beautiful Mornin'" at the end of the recording. The song features a whistler, as well as Jamaican instruments in a calypso style.

== Chart history ==
=== Weekly charts ===
Chart (1970)	Peak position
Argentina (CAPIF)	7
Australia (Kent Music Report)	9
Australia (Go-Set)	7
Austria (Hitradio Ö3)	12
Belgium (Ultratop 50 Flanders)	12
Belgium (Ultratop 50 Wallonia)	44
Canada RPM Adult Contemporary	15
Canada RPM Top Singles	5
France (IFOP)	43
Ireland (IRMA)	14
Netherlands (Dutch Top 40)	2
Netherlands (Single Top 100)	17
New Zealand (Listener)	12
Singapore Rediffusion, Singapore	1
South Africa (Springbok)	5
UK Singles Chart	3
US Billboard Hot 100	8
US Billboard Easy Listening	18
US Cash Box Top 100	6

Freddie Notes & the Rudies cover

Chart (1970)	Peak position
UK Singles Chart	45

Sugar Cane cover

Chart (1978)	Peak position
UK Singles Chart	54

Jon Stevens cover

Chart (1980)	Peak position
New Zealand (RIANZ)	1

Quarrington/Worthy cover

Chart (1980)	Peak position
Canada RPM Adult Contemporary	15

Allniters cover

Chart (1983)	Peak position
Australia (Kent Music Report)	19

Amazulu cover

Chart (1986–1987)	Peak position
Canada Top Singles (RPM)	6
Ireland (IRMA)	14
South Africa (Springbok)	16
UK Singles Chart	16
US Billboard Hot 100	90

=== Year-end charts ===
Chart (1970)	Rank
Australia	84
Canada	77
UK	41

== Jon Stevens version ==
"Montego Bay"

Single by Jon Stevens

from the album Jezebel
- B-side: "Sha La La"
- Released: January 1980
- Genre: Pop rock
- Label: CBS
- Songwriters: B. Bloom, J. Barry
- Producer: Jay Lewis

Jon Stevens singles chronology
"Jezebel" (1979)	"Montego Bay" (1980)	"Don't Let Love Go" (1980)

In January 1980, New Zealand recording artist Jon Stevens released a version as a single. It peaked at No.1 in New Zealand, allowing Stevens to replace himself at No.1, and stayed there for two weeks.

=== Track listing ===
Vinyl, 7-inch, 45 RPM

1. "Montego Bay" 2:50
2. "Sha La La" 4:25

=== Charts ===
Weekly chart performance for "Montego Bay"
Chart (1980)	Peak position
New Zealand (RIANZ)	1

=== Year-end charts ===
Year-end chart performance for "Montego Bay"
Chart (1980)	Position
New Zealand (RIANZ)	43

== Other recordings ==
- (1970) Freddie Notes & The Rudies – (Trojan Records)
- (1971) The Bar-Kays on their album Black Rock
- (1978) Sugar Cane – a minor UK disco hit for the U.S. male/female vocal group. Highest position in UK Singles Chart – No. 54
- (1983) Allniters – a Top 20 hit for an Australian ska band.
- (1986) Amazulu – reached No. 16 in the UK and No. 6 in Canada and was a minor hit in the U.S. in September 1986

== See also ==
- List of number-one singles from the 1980s (New Zealand)
- List of 1970s one-hit wonders in the United States
