= The Return of Bruno (film) =

1987 comedic short film

The Return of Bruno is a 1987 comedic film, originally aired as a one-hour special on HBO and later released on VHS. The mockumentary stars Bruce Willis as his fictional alter-ego Bruno Radolini, a legendary blues singer/musician who influenced, as the story goes, a number of other famous musicians. Written by Paul Flattery, Bruce V. DiMattia, and Kenny Solms, it was produced by Paul Flattery, directed by Jim Yukich, and narrated by Dick Clark.

Musicians appearing as themselves, paying "tribute" to Bruno, include Phil Collins, Elton John, Ringo Starr, Jon Bon Jovi, Freddie Garrity, Brian Wilson, Grace Slick, Joan Baez, Graham Nash, Stephen Stills, Melvin Franklin, The Bee Gees, Paul Stanley, and Bobby Colomby. The film also features Bill Graham, Wolfman Jack, Michael J. Fox, Clive Davis, Henry Diltz, and Don Cornelius.

The film's songs are taken from the album The Return of Bruno, supplemented with "No One's Home" by Bruce V. DiMattia and "Peter Gunn" by Henry Mancini.

The film was nominated for a 1988 Award for Cable Excellence in the category Writing a Musical Special or Series.
