= Terry Manning =

American musician and recording engineer (1947–2025)

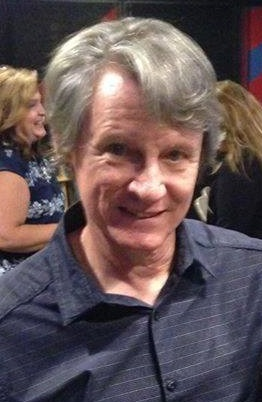
- Manning in 2015

Background information
- Born: Terry Don Manning; December 29, 1947; Oklahoma City, Oklahoma, U.S.
- Died: March 25, 2025 (aged 77) El Paso, Texas, U.S.
- Genres: Rock; new wave; pop rock
- Occupations: Singer-songwriter; multi-instrumentalist; record producer; audio engineer; photographer
- Instruments: Keyboards; guitar; vocals
- Years active: 1963–2025
- Website: terrymanning.com

Terry Don Manning (December 29, 1947 – March 25, 2025) was an American recording engineer, record producer, musician and photographer. In a career spanning more than 50 years, he worked with Led Zeppelin, Iron Maiden, Bryan Adams, ZZ Top, the Tragically Hip, Zeno, Booker T. & the MG's, Shakira, Isaac Hayes, Otis Redding, Rhino Bucket, Johnny Winter, the Fabulous Thunderbirds, Big Star, Johnny Taylor, Jason and the Scorchers, the Staple Singers, Molly Hatchet, George Thorogood, Al Green, Widespread Panic, Shania Twain, Joe Cocker, Joe Walsh, and Lenny Kravitz, among others.

In 2013, Manning was inducted into the International Rockabilly Hall of Fame, the West Texas Music Hall of Fame, and the Bobby Fuller Four and Border Legends Cultural Center of El Paso, Texas. In October 2013, ECR Music Group released Manning's album West Texas Skyline, a tribute to Bobby Fuller. In January 2015, ECR released Manning's album Heaven Knows, and in 2019 ECR released a live Manning album, Playin' in Elvis' House, recorded in Elvis Presley's first home on Audubon Avenue in Memphis, Tennessee.

== Early years ==
Terry Manning was born on December 29, 1947, in Oklahoma City, and lived for a period in El Paso, Texas, before eventually moving in his teenage years to Memphis, Tennessee. At Central High School, Manning showed a talent for sports, and he ran track and was all-city quarterback on the football team. He attended Memphis State University (now University of Memphis), where he was captain of the soccer team and played junior varsity basketball. Before moving to Memphis, Manning worked in the music industry while he was still located in El Paso. While living there, he played guitar and sang with several local bands, including sitting in with Bobby Fuller and leading a local band called the Wild Ones.

== Music career ==
After moving to Memphis, Tennessee, Manning worked for years at both Stax Records and Ardent Studios as an engineer and producer, recording and mixing. He was a principal part of Stax owner Al Bell's production team for the Staple Singers, responsible for such hit records as "Heavy Makes You Happy", "Respect Yourself", and "I'll Take You There".

Manning befriended British guitarist Jimmy Page in 1966 during a US tour by the Yardbirds which was supported by the American band Lawson and Four More with Manning on keyboards. The two spent hours talking about Delta blues. Page sought out Manning's engineering talents during the final mixing of Led Zeppelin III, and when the record company failed to credit Manning's contribution, Page insisted that Atlantic Records destroy the incorrect album cover and print new ones. Manning said this gesture was a great boost for his career.

In 1970, Manning licensed release of his own solo album, Home Sweet Home, on Stax's Enterprise label, re-released with extra tracks by Sunbeam in 2006. In the mid-1980s, Manning moved to London, and worked for a year at EMI's Abbey Road Studios. In 1992, he moved to Nassau, Bahamas, to partner with Chris Blackwell in Compass Point Studios, which he operated for over 20 years.

In October 2013, Manning released the album West Texas Skyline: A Tribute To Bobby Fuller. He released Heaven Knows in 2015, Planets in 2016, and Playin' in Elvis' House in 2019. In January 2025, Manning released Red And Black.

== Photography career ==
Manning was interested and involved in photography almost as long as in music. A close friend starting in the 1960s was William Eggleston, who served as a mentor, as well as introducing young Manning to other photographers such as William Christenberry, Diane Arbus and Lee Friedlander. Although Manning's favorite work was his "evocative urban landscapes," he also photographed Chuck Berry, Procol Harum, Steppenwolf, Terry Reid, Jimi Hendrix, Dusty Springfield, Lenny Kravitz, and many other musical artists of the rock music genre, as both an independent and as a writer/photographer for New Musical Express (NME). He worked as a photojournalist for NME. He photographed Martin Luther King Jr. on April 3, 1968, the day before King was assassinated.

In August 2015, Manning's photography work began showing at art galleries in several cities. Two photography books were released Scientific Evidence Of Life On Earth During Two Millennia, and Cuba Despues Del Tiempo Especial, Antes De Los Americanos, and a number of photography books and new exhibits were planned.

== Personal life and death ==
Manning regularly competed in marathons, including two entries in the New York Marathon. He achieved a ranking of 19th nationally in racquetball, and worked as a racquetball instructor for several years. He completed Bachelor of Arts degrees in Political Science and History.

In 1992, Manning moved to the Bahamas with his wife Sherrie Manning where he worked with Chris Blackwell at his studio. Sherrie died from cancer in 2013 in Nassau. In 2017, Manning married Janet Brunton and returned to El Paso, Texas. Manning had a stepson, Cory, and three children, Lucas, Michael, and Yuri. On March 25, 2025, Manning died following an accidental fall at home, at the age of 77.
