= Pops Staples =

American musician (1914–2000)

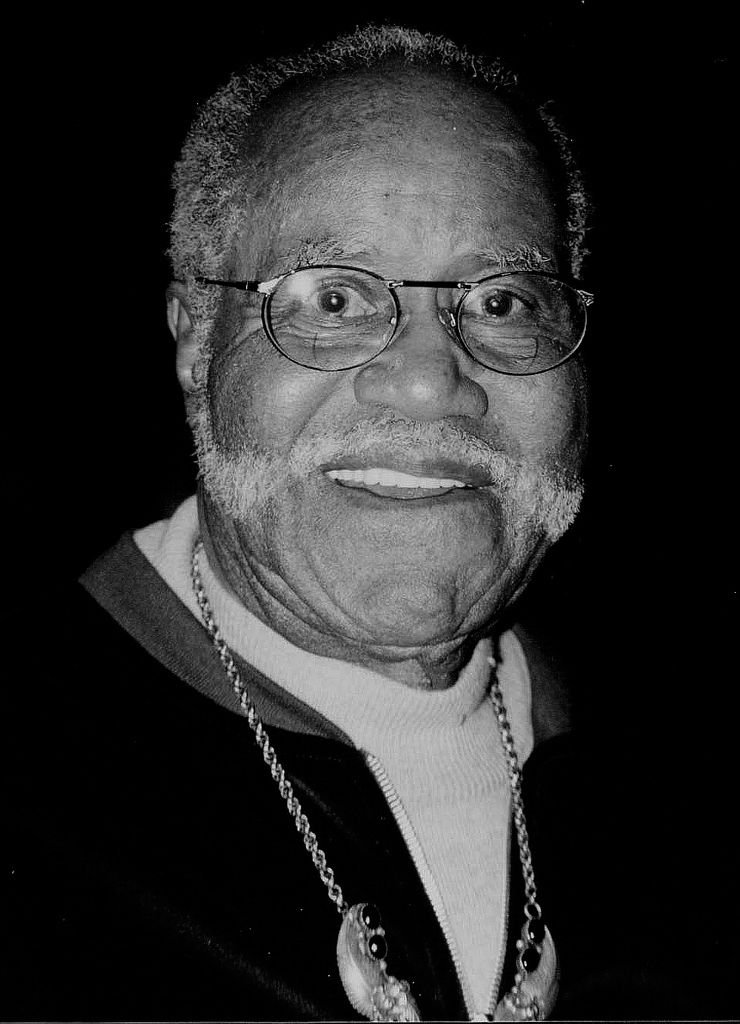
- Staples in 2000

Background information
- Also known as: "Pops"
- Born: Roebuck Staples; December 28, 1914; Winona, Mississippi, U.S.
- Died: December 19, 2000 (aged 85) Chicago, Illinois, U.S.
- Genres: Christian; gospel; R&B; blues
- Occupations: Musician; songwriter
- Instruments: Guitar; vocals
- Years active: 1948–1998
- Labels: United; Vee-Jay; Curtom; Stax; Riverside

Roebuck "Pops" Staples (December 28, 1914 – December 19, 2000) was an American gospel and R&B musician. A "pivotal figure in gospel in the 1960s and 1970s", he was a songwriter, guitarist and singer. He was the patriarch and member of singing group The Staple Singers, which included his son Pervis and daughters Mavis, Yvonne, and Cleotha.

== Life and career ==
Roebuck Staples was born near Winona, Mississippi, the youngest of 14 children. He grew up on a cotton plantation near Drew, Mississippi. From his earliest years he heard, and began to play with, local blues guitarists such as Charlie Patton (who lived on the nearby Dockery Plantation), Robert Johnson, and Son House. He dropped out of school after the eighth grade, then sang with a gospel group before marrying and moving to Chicago in 1935.

There, he sang with the Trumpet Jubilees while working in the stockyards, in construction work, and later in a steel mill. In 1948, Roebuck and his wife Oceola Staples formed The Staple Singers to sing as a gospel group in local churches, with their children. The Staple Singers first recorded in the early 1950s for United and then the larger Vee-Jay Records, with songs including 1955's "This May Be the Last Time" (later adapted by The Rolling Stones as "The Last Time") and "Uncloudy Day". In the 1960s, the Staple Singers moved to Riverside Records, Epic Records, and later Stax Records and began recording protest, inspirational and contemporary music, reflecting the civil rights and anti-war movements of the time. They gained a large new audience with "Respect Yourself" (which featured Pops, nearly 57 at the time, on lead on the long version for more than two minutes), the 1972 US number one hit "I'll Take You There", "If You're Ready (Come Go with Me)", and other hits. "Let's Do It Again" topped the Hot 100 on December 27, 1975, the day before his 61st birthday. Pops Staples (as Pop Staples) also recorded a blues album, Jammed Together, with fellow guitarists Albert King and Steve Cropper.

In 1976, Staples also appeared in the movie documenting The Band's final concert, The Last Waltz (released in 1978). Pops Staples shared vocals with his daughters and with Levon Helm and Rick Danko on "The Weight." The group appeared in the concert on stage, but their later performance shot on a soundstage was used in the final film. It is considered by some fans as the definitive version of the song. After Mavis left for a solo career in the 1980s, Pops Staples began a solo career, appearing at international "blues" festivals (though steadfastly refusing to sing the blues). Over the course of his career, he was nominated for three Grammy Awards, winning the 1995 Best Contemporary Blues Album Grammy for Father, Father.

Staples also tried his hand at acting. In 1986, Roebuck played the role of Mr. Tucker, a voodoo witch doctor, in the Talking Heads film True Stories, during which he performed "Papa Legba". The next year, Oceola died, aged 69. He appeared as himself in the 1997 Barry Levinson film Wag the Dog, singing "Good Old Shoe" with Willie Nelson.

He died after suffering an ultimately fatal concussion in a fall at his home, just nine days shy of his 86th birthday. After his death, his daughters Yvonne and Mavis gave one of his guitars to country and gospel musician Marty Stuart.

== Influence ==
Musicians as diverse as Cannonball Adderley, Ry Cooder, Sandy Bull, Marty Stuart, and Bonnie Raitt have all expressed their respect for Staples.

== Discography ==
=== Solo albums ===
- 1992 – Peace to the Neighborhood
- 1994 – Father Father
- 2015 – Don't Lose This

=== Collaborations ===
- 1969 – Jammed Together – with Steve Cropper & Albert King
- Performed on "Papa Legba" on the 2006 reissue of the True Stories album by Talking Heads. The song appeared on the 2006 CD issue only. The performance of "Papa Legba" by Pops Staples that was included in the 2006 reissue runs a full minute longer than the track included in the "complete soundtrack" version of 2018.

== Awards and honors ==
At the 4th Annual Grammy Awards for musical achievements in 1961, Pops Staples's album Swing Low was nominated in the Best Gospel or Other Religious Recording category.

Staples's 1992 album Peace to the Neighborhood earned a Grammy nomination in the Best Contemporary Blues Album category.

In 1995, he won the Best Contemporary Blues Album Grammy for Father, Father.

In 1998, Pops Staples received a National Heritage Fellowship from the National Endowment for the Arts, which is the highest honor in the folk and traditional arts in the United States.

In 1999, the Staple Singers were inducted into the Rock and Roll Hall of Fame.

In 2010, Staples was honored with a marker on the Mississippi Blues Trail in his hometown of Winona, Mississippi.

In 2018, Staples was inducted into the Blues Hall of Fame.
