= Heavy Makes You Happy =

"Heavy Makes You Happy" was a hit song for Bobby Bloom in 1971. The song was written by Jeff Barry and Bloom, while Barry produced it. It was also a hit for The Staple Singers. Other artists who have recorded it include, The Alabama State Troupers, Gladys Knight & the Pips, Claudja Barry, The Solution and Keb' Mo'.

== Bobby Bloom version ==
"Heavy Makes You Happy"

Song by Bobby Bloom

from the album The Bobby Bloom Album
- A-side: "Heavy Makes You Happy"
- B-side: "Give 'Em a Hand"
- Released: November 27, 1970
- Label: Polydor 2001-122
- Songwriter(s): Barry - Bloom
- Producer(s): Jeff Barry

Bobby Bloom's version was released in the UK by Polydor Records in 1970, in support of the album, The Bobby Bloom Album.

A promo film for the song was aired on BBC1 Top of the Pops on Thursday 21 January 1971.

=== Charts ===
"Heavy Makes You Happy" debuted in the Melody Maker Pop 30 chart at No. 28 for the week of January 30, 1971. On the main UK singles chart, it peaked at No. 31 on January 31.

== Staple Singers version ==
"Heavy Makes You Happy (Sha-Na-Boom Boom)"

Single by The Staple Singers

from the album The Staple Swingers
- B-side: "Love is Plentiful"
- Released: November 1970
- Recorded: 1970
- Studio: Rhythm recorded at Muscle Shoals Sound Studios
- Genre: Soul; bubblegum
- Length: 2:58
- Label: Stax STA-0083
- Songwriter(s): Jeff Barry, Bobby Bloom
- Producer(s): Al Bell

The Staple Singers singles chronology
"Love Is Plentiful" (1970)	"Heavy Makes You Happy (Sha-Na-Boom Boom)" (1970)	"You've Got to Earn It" (1971)

"Heavy Makes You Happy" was recorded by the Staple Singers. It was a hit on the Billboard and Cash Box charts. Backed with a Bettye Crutcher, Bobby Manuel composition, "Love is Plentiful", the single was released on Stax STA 0083 in November, 1970.

=== Airplay ===
The song had some airplay at Top 40 station WQXI in Atlanta for the week of February 6, 1971.

=== Charts ===
"Heavy Makes You Happy (Sha-Na-Boom Boom)" debuted at no. 97 on the Billboard Hot 100 chart on the week of February 6, 1971. It peaked at no. 27 on April 10 and spent a total of 12 weeks in the chart.

It debuted at no. 33 in the Billboard Best Selling Soul Singles chart on the week of February 6. It peaked at no. 6 on April 3 and spent a total of 13 weeks in the chart.

It debuted at no. 93 in the Cash Box Top 100 chart on February 20, 1971. It peaked no. 24 on April 3, and spent a total of ten weeks in the chart.

== Other versions ==
=== 1970s ===
The Alabama State Troupers released a live version of the song in 1972. It was recorded by Gladys Knight & the Pips and released in 1973, Claudja Barry recorded a version which was in 1978.

=== 1980s to 2000s ===
The Solution recorded a version, released in 2007, and Keb Mo released his live version in 2017.
