= Al Bell =

American musical artist and executive (born 1940)

- Birth name: Alvertis Isbell
- Born: March 15, 1940 (age 85); Brinkley, Arkansas, United States
- Genres: Soul, gospel
- Occupation(s): Record producer, songwriter, record executive, disc jockey
- Years active: 1965 – present
- Labels: Stax, Motown, Bellmark

Al Bell (born Alvertis Isbell; March 15, 1940) is an American record producer, songwriter, and record executive. He is best known as having been an executive and co-owner of Stax Records with Jim Stewart based in Memphis, Tennessee, during the latter half of the label's 19-year existence.

A former disc jockey in his hometown of Little Rock, Arkansas, Bell was vital to the careers of Stax's soul stars such as the Staple Singers and Isaac Hayes, the Emotions, the Dramatics, and Mel and Tim. Bell's promotional efforts drove the "Memphis sound" internationally and made Stax the second-largest African-American–owned business in the 1970s. In 2009, the BBC profiled Bell as "one of the icons of soul music" and "the driving force behind Stax Records".

Following his career at Stax, Bell became president of Motown Records Group during its restructuring for sale to MCA and Boston Ventures Group. He later started his own label, Bellmark, whose releases included Tag Team's single "Whoomp! (There It Is)" (1993). Today, Bell works in the independent music scene in Memphis and maintains an online music website and radio show at AlBellPresents.com.

== Biography ==
=== Early career at Stax ===
Bell joined Stax in 1965 as director of promotions and was essential in aiding the growth of the company's revenue. Over the next three years, he rose through the ranks of the company, eventually becoming executive vice president and the most influential figure in the company after co-founder Jim Stewart. In addition to his administrative and promotional work, Bell was often directly involved in the production of the label's music, working as a songwriter and a producer for several acts on the label.

In 1968, following the plane crash that killed Stax's biggest star, Otis Redding, Stax severed its distribution deal with Atlantic Records, who retained the label's back catalog to that point. Bell launched an initiative designed to put out enough albums and singles in an effort to rebuild a catalog for Stax. New signees included gospel stars the Staple Singers as well as newcomers the Emotions and the Soul Children. Bell notably scheduled twenty-seven albums for near-simultaneous release in mid-1969 and produced much of the material himself. One of those albums, Hot Buttered Soul, by Stax songwriter and producer Isaac Hayes, was a significant success, establishing Hayes as a recording artist in his own right. Bell was directly involved in shaping the careers of the Staple Singers, creating for them a new sound which resulted in hits such as "Respect Yourself" and "I'll Take You There," the latter of which he wrote.

=== Stax in the 1970s ===
Bell became co-owner of Stax in 1969 when co-founder Estelle Axton, unhappy with Bell's visions for the company, sold her shares and departed from the label. He therefore became the first African-American to have equity in the label; although Stax specialized in African-American music, both of its founders, Stewart and Axton, were white.

In the 1970s Stewart began turning over more and more of Stax's daily operations to Bell, who began ambitious plans to expand the company's operations, similar to what Berry Gordy, Jr. had been doing at Motown Records. Stax began distributing music from several smaller Memphis labels and produced and released the soundtracks for feature films such as Sweet Sweetback's Baadasssss Song and Shaft (both 1971). In 1972, Al Bell supervised the Wattstax festival, a day-long concert featuring Stax artists which was held in Los Angeles in response to the Watts riots. The 1973 documentary film Wattstax was produced by the label's new film division.

After four years of the label distributing its own records, Bell signed a new distribution deal with CBS Records in 1972. Stax's relationship with CBS was tumultuous at best; with Bell and the Stax staff borrowing heavily from Memphis' Union Planters Bank but CBS withholding records from stores and profits from Stax, the label's fortunes sharply declined until it slid into bankruptcy and was closed by court order in late 1975. Bell was indicted for, and later acquitted of, bank fraud during the Stax bankruptcy proceedings.

=== Later career ===
After Stax folded, Bell returned to Little Rock. He voluntarily stayed away from the music industry for a decade, save for periodic participation in local recordings. In the 1980s, he became head of the Motown Records Group and worked closely with Berry Gordy Jr. in the sale of Motown to the MCA/Boston Ventures Group. After Motown, he discovered the music group Tag Team and through his Bellmark Records label released their hit single "Whoomp! (There It Is)" (1993), which became one of the fastest-selling singles in the music industry history. Bell also released Prince's hit single "The Most Beautiful Girl in the World", after Prince's label Warner Bros. Records turned him down.

After Bellmark Records, Bell returned to Little Rock to begin work on a new web-based venture, Al Bell Presents, for which he hosts a successful online radio program, Al Bell Presents: American Soul Music. In 2009, Bell was profiled in The New York Times and on the BBC as he returned to Memphis to help develop the city's independent music scene.

Bell gave interviews for the HBO documentary Stax: Soulsville U.S.A. (2024).

== Awards ==
Bell has received numerous awards, including:

- Americana Music Association Lifetime Achievement Award for Executive, September 14, 2022
- Induction into the Official Rhythm & Blues Music Hall of Fame in Clarksdale, Mississippi, June 6, 2015
- Inducted into the Arkansas Business Hall of Fame, February 13, 2015
- Induction into the Memphis Music Hall of Fame, 2014
- Grammy Trustees Award, 2011
- Arthur A. Fletcher Lifetime Achievement Award from the National Black Chamber of Commerce
- Alex Haley "Roots Award," Greater Washington, DC Business Center
- National Award of Achievement, U.S. Department of Commerce
- Dare to Soar Award, Mosaic Templars Cultural Center
- Achievement Award, Boy Scouts of America
- 1000 Most Successful Blacks, Ebony Magazine
- 100 Most Influential Black Men, Ebony Magazine
- Entered in "Who's Who in the World"
- Induction into America's Music and Entertainment of Fame
- Induction into the Arkansas Black Hall of Fame
- Member of the Board of Directors, Memphis Chamber of Commerce
- Member of the Board of Directors, Central Arkansas Chapter of the March of Dimes
- Member of the Board of Trustees, Philander Smith College
- Memphis' Legendary Record Producers Award, 2005
- W.C. Handy Lifetime Achievement Award, 2002
- Record Executive of the Year, Impact Magazine, 1994
- Record Executive of the Year, BRE, 1994
- Chairman's Award, Southeast Music, 1994
- NARM Indie Best Seller Award ("Whoomp! There It Is", Tag Team), 1994
- Independent Label of the Year Award, The Urban Network, 1994
- The Spirit of Freedom Award, Freedom Magazine, 1994
- Russell Simmons Award for Executive Excellence, Young Black Programmers' Coalition, 1993
- Black Music Chief Executive of the Year, Impact, 1993
- Living Legend Award, Warner Bros., Reprise Records & Urban Network, 1972 Heroes and Legends Leadership Award, 1991
- Voted Number Five in the 30 All-Time Greatest Executives in Black Music, Impact Magazine Poll, 1985
- Best Documentary (Wattstax), nomination Golden Globe (1973)
- Executive of the Year, Bill Gavin Radio Program Conference, 1971
