= The Staple Singers =

American gospel, soul, and R&B singing group

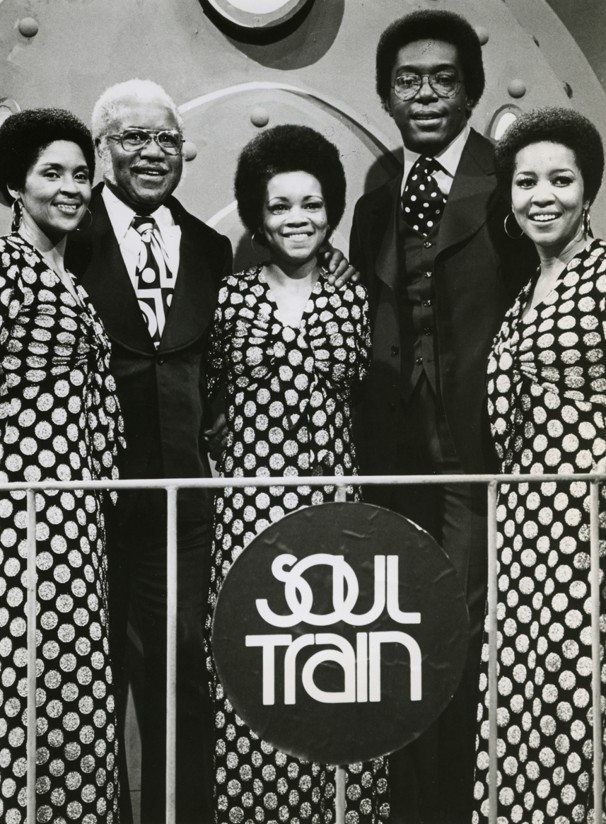
- The Staple Singers with Soul Train host Don Cornelius in 1974.

Background information
- Origin: Chicago, Illinois, United States
- Genres: Soul; blues; funk; R&B; gospel; pop
- Years active: 1948–1994; 1999
- Labels: United; Vee-Jay; Checker; Riverside; Stax; Epic; Columbia; Discos CBS; CBS Records; American Recording Company; Curtom; United Artists; WEA; Warner Bros.; Atlantic; Sony Music
- Past members: Roebuck "Pops" Staples; Cleotha Staples; Mavis Staples; Pervis Staples; Yvonne Staples

The Staple Singers was an American gospel, soul, and R&B singing group. Roebuck "Pops" Staples (December 28, 1914 – December 19, 2000), the patriarch of the family, formed the group with his children Cleotha (April 11, 1934 – February 21, 2013), Pervis (November 18, 1935 – May 6, 2021), and Mavis (b. July 10, 1939). Yvonne (October 23, 1937 – April 10, 2018) replaced her brother when he was drafted into the U.S. Army, and again in 1970. They are best known for their 1970s hits "Respect Yourself", "I'll Take You There", "If You're Ready (Come Go with Me)", and "Let's Do It Again". While the family name is Staples, the group used "Staple" commercially.

== History ==
First child to Roebuck "Pops" Staples and his wife Oceola Staples, Cleotha was born in Drew, Mississippi, in 1934. Two years later, Roebuck moved his family from Mississippi to Chicago. Roebuck and Oceola's children, son Pervis and daughters, Mavis and Yvonne, were born in Chicago. Roebuck worked in steel mills and meatpacking plants while his family of four children grew up. The family began appearing in Chicago-area churches in 1948. Their first public singing appearance was at the Mount Zion Church, Chicago, where Roebuck's brother, the Rev. Chester Staples, was pastor.

They signed their first professional contract in 1952. During their early career, they recorded in an acoustic gospel-folk style with various labels: United Records, Vee-Jay Records (their "Uncloudy Day" and "Will the Circle Be Unbroken?" were best sellers), Checker Records, Riverside Records, and then Epic Records in 1965. "Uncloudy Day" was an early influence on Bob Dylan, who said of it in 2015, "It was the most mysterious thing I'd ever heard ... I'd think about them even at my school desk ... Mavis looked to be about the same age as me in her picture (on the cover of "Uncloudy Day") ... Her singing just knocked me out ... And Mavis was a great singer—deep and mysterious. And even at the young age, I felt that life itself was a mystery."

The move to Epic yielded a run of albums, including the live in-church Freedom Highway album produced by Billy Sherrill; the title track of which was a civil rights movement protest song penned by Pops Staples. It was on Epic that the Staple Singers developed a style more accessible to mainstream audiences, with "Why (Am I Treated So Bad)" and "For What It's Worth" (Stephen Stills) in 1967. In 1968, the Staple Singers signed to Stax Records and released two albums with Steve Cropper—Soul Folk in Action and We'll Get Over, Pervis returning for them. After Cropper left Stax, Al Bell produced their recordings, conducting the rhythm sessions at the famed Muscle Shoals Sound Studio and cutting the overdubs himself with engineer/musician Terry Manning at Memphis's Ardent Studios, moving in a more funk and soul direction. Their song "Brand New Day", written by Al Kooper for the film, was used as the theme song (and for the opening title credits) of The Landlord (1970).

"For most of this decade, Roebuck Staples—born December 28, 1914, about One Year & two weeks after Frank Sinatra—has been the oldest performer with direct access to the hit parade by some twenty-five years, so here's your chance to mind your elders. It's Mavis's lowdown, occasionally undefined growl that dominates, of course; you should hear how secular she gets with an O. V. Wright blues that got buried on The Staple Swingers. But Pops's unassuming moralism sets the tone and his guitar assures the flow."

— The Best of the Staples Singers review in Christgau's Record Guide: Rock Albums of the Seventies (1981)

The Staple Singers' first Stax hit was "Heavy Makes You Happy (Sha-Na-Boom-Boom)" in early 1971. Their late 1971 recording of "Respect Yourself", written by Luther Ingram and Mack Rice, peaked at number two on the Billboard R&B chart and number 12 on the Billboard Hot 100. Both hits sold over one million copies and were each awarded a gold disc by the Recording Industry Association of America. The song's theme of self-empowerment had universal appeal, released in the period immediately following the intense American civil rights movement of the 1960s. In 1972, "I'll Take You There" topped both Billboard charts. In 1973, "If You're Ready (Come Go With Me)" reached number 9 on the Hot 100 and number one on the R&B chart.

After Stax's 1975 bankruptcy, The Staple Singers signed to Curtis Mayfield's label, Curtom Records, and released "Let's Do It Again", produced by Mayfield; the song became their second number-one pop hit in the U.S., and the album was also successful. In 1976, they collaborated with The Band for their film The Last Waltz, performing on the song "The Weight" (which The Staple Singers had previously covered on their first Stax album). However, they were not able to regain their momentum, releasing only occasional minor hits. The 1984 album Turning Point featured a cover of Talking Heads' "Slippery People", which reached the Top 5 on the Dance chart. In 1994, they again performed the song "The Weight" with country music artist Marty Stuart for MCA Nashville's Rhythm, Country and Blues compilation, somewhat re-establishing an audience. The song "Respect Yourself" was used by Spike Lee in the soundtrack to his movie Crooklyn, made in 1994.

In 1999, The Staple Singers were inducted into the Rock and Roll Hall of Fame, where they performed "Respect Yourself" and "I'll Take You There".

Pops Staples died of complications from a concussion suffered in December 2000. Cleotha Staples died in Chicago on February 21, 2013, at the age of 78, after suffering from Alzheimer's disease for over a decade. Mavis Staples has continued to collaborate on both the projects of other artists and her own solo work. In 2022, she released Carry Me Home, a collaboration with Levon Helm, recorded at Helm's Midnight Ramble in 2011. She appeared at Glastonbury in 2015 and 2019, and her 2016 album Livin' on a High Note includes a simple acoustic version of a Martin Luther King sermon in the track "MLK Song". Yvonne Staples died on April 10, 2018, at the age of 80. Pervis Staples died suddenly in his home in Dolton, Illinois, on May 6, 2021, at the age of 85, leaving Mavis as the band's last surviving member.

== Documentary ==
The 2015 documentary film Mavis! recounts the history of The Staple Singers and follows Mavis Staples's solo career after Pops Staples's death. Directed by Jessica Edwards, the film premiered at the 2015 South by Southwest Film Festival and was broadcast by HBO in February 2016.

== Awards ==
The Staple Singers were inducted into the Rock and Roll Hall of Fame in 1999 and the Gospel Music Hall of Fame in 2018. They were also honored with a marker on the Mississippi Blues Trail in Drew, Mississippi. In 2005, the group was awarded the Grammy Lifetime Achievement Award.

== Discography ==
=== Early albums ===
- A Gospel Program (with The Caravans) (Gospel/Savoy MG-3001, 1958)
- Uncloudy Day (Vee Jay VJLP-5000, 1959)
- Will the Circle Be Unbroken (Vee Jay VJLP-5008, 1960)
- Swing Low (Vee Jay VJLP-5014, 1961)
- Hammer and Nails (Riverside RLP-3501, 1962)
- The Twenty-Fifth Day of December (Riverside RLP-3513, 1962)
- This Land (Riverside RM-3524, 1963)
- Swing Low Sweet Chariot (Vee Jay VJLP-5030, 1963)
- Amen! (Epic BN-26132, 1965)
- Freedom Highway (Epic BN-26163, 1965)
- This Little Light (Riverside RM-3527, 1965)
- Why (Epic BN-26196, 1966)
- Pray On (Epic BN-26237, 1967)
- For What It's Worth (Epic BN-26332, 1967)
- What the World Needs Now is Love (Epic BN-26373, 1968)
- Soul Folk in Action (Stax STS-2004, 1968)
- We'll Get Over (Stax STS-2016, 1969)

=== Charted albums ===
Year	Title	Peak chart positions			Record label
Year	Title	US	US R&B	CAN	Record label
1971	The Staple Swingers	117	9	—	Stax
1972	Be Altitude: Respect Yourself	19	3	72	Stax
1973	Be What You Are	102	13	—	Stax
1974	City in the Sky	125	13	—	Stax
1975	Let's Do It Again	20	1	87	Curtom
1976	Pass It On	155	20	—	Warner Bros.
1977	Family Tree	—	58	—	Warner Bros.
1978	Unlock Your Mind	—	34	—	Warner Bros.
1984	Turning Point	—	43	—	Private I
"—" denotes releases that did not chart or were not released in that territory.

=== Charted singles ===
Year	Title	Peak chart positions					Album
Year	Title	US	US R&B	AUS	CAN	UK	Album
1967	"Why? (Am I Treated So Bad)"	95	—	—	—	—	Why
1967	"For What It's Worth"	66	—	—	—	—	For What It's Worth
1970	"Love Is Plentiful"	—	31	—	—	—	The Staple Swingers
1971	"Heavy Makes You Happy (Sha-Na-Boom Boom)"	27	6	—	60	—	The Staple Swingers
1971	"You've Got to Earn It"	97	11	—	—	—	The Staple Swingers
1971	"Respect Yourself"	12	2	—	17	—	Be Altitude: Respect Yourself
1972	"I'll Take You There"	1	1	—	21	30	Be Altitude: Respect Yourself
1972	"This World"	38	6	—	85	—	Be Altitude: Respect Yourself
1973	"Oh La De Da"	33	4	—	—	—	Wattstax: The Living Word
1973	"Be What You Are"	66	18	—	—	—	Be What You Are
1973	"If You're Ready (Come Go with Me)"	9	1	—	79	34	Be What You Are
1974	"Touch a Hand, Make a Friend"	23	3	—	33	—	Be What You Are
1974	"City in the Sky"	79	4	—	—	—	City in the Sky
1974	"My Main Man"	76	18	—	—	—	City in the Sky
1975	"Let's Do It Again"	1	1	97	7	—	Let's Do It Again
1976	"New Orleans"	70	4	—	84	—	Let's Do It Again
1976	"Love Me, Love Me, Love Me"	—	11	—	—	—	Pass It On
1977	"Sweeter Than the Sweet"	—	52	—	—	—	Pass It On
1977	"See a Little Further (Than My Bed)"	—	77	—	—	—	Family Tree
1978	"I Honestly Love You"	—	68	—	—	—	Family Tree
1978	"Unlock Your Mind"	—	16	—	—	—	Unlock Your Mind
1979	"Chica Boom"	—	82	—	—	—	Unlock Your Mind
1984	"H-A-T-E (Don't Live Here Anymore)"	—	46	—	—	—	Turning Point
1984	"Slippery People"	109	22	—	—	78	Turning Point
1984	"This Is Our Night"	—	50	—	—	—	Turning Point
1985	"Are You Ready?"	—	39	—	—	—	The Staple Singers
1985	"Nobody Can Make It on Their Own"	—	89	—	—	—	The Staple Singers
"—" denotes releases that did not chart or were not released in that territory.
