= Billboard Hot Soul Hits =

Compilation album by Various artists
- Released: July 18, 1995
- Genres: Soul, rhythm and blues, pop
- Label: Rhino

Billboard Hot Soul Hits is a series of compilation albums released by Rhino Records in 1995, compiling 50 hit soul music recordings, which were popular in the 1970s. Five albums were released, containing ten songs from a specific year from 1970 through 1974. This series follows Rhino's Billboard Top R&B Hits series which covers the years 1955-1969. It is followed chronologically by Billboard Hot R&B Hits, covering the years 1980-1989, skipping the years 1975-1979.

All tracks on the albums were hits on the Billboard Best Selling Soul Singles chart (renamed "Hot Soul Singles" in 1973). Several of the tracks were crossover hits onto the pop charts.

== 1970 ==
1. "Love on a Two-Way Street" — The Moments 3:46
2. "Thank You (Falettinme Be Mice Elf Agin)" — Sly & the Family Stone 4:52
3. "ABC" — The Jackson 5 2:59
4. "Rainy Night in Georgia" — Brook Benton 3:52
5. "The Thrill Is Gone" — B.B. King 4:02
6. "Didn't I (Blow Your Mind This Time)" — Delfonics 3:23
7. "Patches" — Clarence Carter 3:13
8. "Super Bad (Pts. 1 & 2)" — James Brown 5:04
9. "Call Me" — Aretha Franklin 3:18
10. "Turn Back the Hands of Time" — Tyrone Davis 2:38

== 1971 ==
1. "Want Ads" — Honey Cone 2:46
2. "Smiling Faces Sometimes" — Undisputed Truth 3:18
3. "Have You Seen Her" — Chi-Lites 5:10
4. "Bridge over Troubled Water" — Aretha Franklin 5:32
5. "Don't Knock My Love (Pt. 1)" Wilson Pickett 2:15
6. "(Do The) Push and Pull (Pt. 1)" — Rufus Thomas 3:21
7. "Jody's Got Your Girl and Gone" — Johnnie Taylor 3:01
8. "If I Were Your Woman" — Gladys Knight & The Pips 3:13
9. "Thin Line Between Love and Hate" — The Persuaders 3:23
10. "Hot Pants" — James Brown 3:09

== 1972 ==
1. "If You Don't Know Me by Now" — Harold Melvin & the Blue Notes 3:27
2. "Betcha by Golly, Wow" — The Stylistics with Russell Thompkins Jr. 3:19
3. "I'll Be Around" — The Spinners 3:11
4. "I'm Still in Love With You" — Al Green 3:13
5. "In the Rain" — The Dramatics 4:33
6. "(If Loving You Is Wrong) I Don't Want to Be Right" — Luther Ingram 3:27
7. "Oh Girl" — The Chi-Lites 3:50
8. "Day Dreaming" — Aretha Franklin 2:46
9. "Talking Loud and Saying Nothing" — James Brown 3:15
10. "Outa-Space" — Billy Preston 4:10

== 1973 ==
1. "Why Can't We Live Together" — Timmy Thomas 3:55
2. "Love Jones" — Brighter Side of Darkness 3:20
3. "One of a Kind (Love Affair)" — The Spinners 3:21
4. "The Love I Lost (Pt. 1)" — Harold Melvin & the Blue Notes 3:38
5. "I'm Gonna Love You Just a Little More Baby" — Barry White 4:09
6. "I Believe in You (You Believe in Me)" — Johnnie Taylor 4:34
7. "That Lady (Pt. 1)" — Isley Brothers 3:21
8. "Angel" — Aretha Franklin 3:33
9. "Stoned Out of My Mind" — Chi-Lites 3:03
10. "Space Race" — Billy Preston 3:28

== 1974 ==
1. "TSOP (The Sound of Philadelphia)" — MFSB featuring the Three Degrees 3:36
2. "Can't Get Enough of Your Love, Babe" — Barry White 3:43
3. "Jungle Boogie" — Kool & the Gang 3:06
4. "Sideshow — Blue Magic 4:12
5. "Then Came You" — Dionne Warwick and the Spinners 3:59
6. "Do It ('Til You're Satisfied)" — B. T. Express 3:14
7. "I Feel a Song (In My Heart)" — Gladys Knight & the Pips 3:19
8. "I'm in Love" — Aretha Franklin 2:47
9. "My Thang" — James Brown 4:19
10. "Mighty Love (Pt. 1)" — The Spinners 3:14
