= Funky Chicken =

Funky Chicken may refer to:

- "Do the Funky Chicken", a 1969 song by Rufus Thomas
- The Chicken (dance), a 1960s-era American rhythm and blues dance
- Chicken Dance, an oom-pah song
