= Tuff City Records =

- Founded: 1981
- Founder: Aaron Fuchs
- Genre: Hip hop, doo-wop, dancehall
- Country of origin: U.S.
- Location: New York City
- Official website: www.tuffcity.com

Tuff City Records is a New York–based record label founded by journalist Aaron Fuchs in 1981. Initially concentrating on hip hop music, the label's roster expanded to include doo-wop, dancehall, and hip hop–jazz fusion, and releases included reissues of music from as far back as the 1940s.

== History ==
Aaron Fuchs was a journalist with Cash Box, and Tuff City was one of the earliest hip hop labels, with Fuchs quitting his job as a journalist to run the label. After the label's first two releases, a distribution deal was signed with CBS Associated Records, although Tuff City severed the link after only a year. The label pioneered the release of albums of break beats—the building blocks for others to use in their recordings. Fuchs also bought the rights to earlier recordings that were sampled by others, bringing money into the label via licensing costs. One of these, "Impeach The President" by the Honey Drippers, was the subject of a court case with Fuchs filing a lawsuit against Sony Music and Def Jam Recordings for illegally sampling the track on recordings by LL Cool J and EPMD. The case was settled out of court. In late 1980s and early 1990s Tuff City released a string of new hip hop recordings by ANTTEX, Lakim Shabazz, Mark the 45 King and YZ. In the mid-1990s, Tuff City launched the Ol' Skool Flava sub-label for reissues of classic hip hop material. Another sub-label, Night Train International, was established to re-release Academy, Lucky Four and Magic Touch blues and rhythm and blues music. Works of Professor Longhair, James Booker, Tuts Washington and Lenny LaCour, among others, have been released by the label.

In subsequent years the label began reissue projects in soul with Soul-Tay-Shus Records, funk with Funky Delicacies, and New York Latin music with Andale Records. Via its subsidiary Tufamerica (also stylized TufAmerica), Tuff City became also known for suing artists like Kanye West and the Beastie Boys for their use of samples the rights to which Tuff City acquired for this purpose.

In another case, Tuff City sued EMI records for its failure to pay royalties to Tuff City in connection with songs credited to the late George Patterson. EMI countered that Tuff City did not have proper chain of title. The case is ongoing, but its status is unknown since the subsequent purchase and break-up of EMI by Universal Music in 2013.
