= Eargasm =

1976 studio album by Johnnie Taylor

Studio album by Johnnie Taylor
- Released: March 1976
- Studios: United Sound Systems, Detroit; Muscle Shoals Sound Studios; Sundance Studios, Dallas
- Genres: R&B, soul
- Length: 34:45
- Label: Columbia
- Producer: Don Davis

Johnnie Taylor chronology
Super Taylor (1974)	Eargasm (1976)	Rated Extraordinaire (1977)

Eargasm is an album by the American R&B singer Johnnie Taylor, released in March 1976 on Columbia Records. The album contains "Disco Lady", which was a No. 1 pop hit for four weeks, and achieved the first platinum certification for a single, with two million copies sold. Eargasm was Taylor's first album for Columbia Records, after many years spent recording for Stax.

The album peaked at No. 5 on the Billboard 200; it spent two weeks at No. 1 on the Soul Albums chart, and peaked at No. 41 in Canada. Taylor's most commercially successful album, Eargasm achieved gold status in 1980 and platinum status in 2001. The album's second single, "Somebody's Gettin' It", was also a hit.

The album helped Taylor earn the Southern Christian Leadership Conference's award for the 1976 "Entertainer of the Year".

== Production and marketing ==
The album was produced by Don Davis. Recorded in Dallas, Detroit, and Memphis, the backing musicians included Bernie Worrell and Bootsy Collins.

The scholar Houston Baker contends that "Disco Lady" was among the first R&B singles to be advertised to white record buyers; this was part of a 1970s practice of major labels signing veteran black musicians, and then focusing on crossover hits rather than career growth.

== Critical reception ==
Professional ratings
Review scores
Source	Rating
AllMusic	3/5 stars
Robert Christgau	C+
The Encyclopedia of Popular Music	3/5 stars
The Rolling Stone Album Guide	3/5 stars

Robert Christgau thought that "Taylor's commitment to the traditional soul style remains unimpeachable even when he accedes to material as modish as the likable but lightweight 'Disco Lady'."

AllMusic deemed "Disco Lady" "the song of year", writing that "the rest of the album was standard soul, but this was overlooked in the rush". The Rolling Stone Album Guide determined that "the songwriting is nowhere near as punchy or pointed as on the Stax records; however, Taylor throws down some heavy gospel-style testimony."

The Dallas Observer, reviewing the album's 1999 rerelease on compact disc, called it "a wonderful record ... full of la-de-de, la-da-dum-da choruses and it-don't-hurt-me verses; the man could sing about infidelity and made it signify even among the most faithful." The Fort Worth Star-Telegram concluded that "Taylor had the good sense to mix strings with the sort of horn-based soul that made him a star on Stax in the '60s and come up with a Memphis/Detroit/Philadelphia hybrid." Music Week wrote that "the album is full of classy urban ballads and tidy midtempo grooves, with only 'It Don't Hurt Me Like It Used To' in true disco tempo."

== Track listing ==
Eargasm track listing
No.	Title	Writer(s)	Length
1.	"Disco Lady"	Albert James Vance, Don Davis, Harvey Scales	4:25
2.	"Please Don't Stop (That Song from Playing)"	Don Davis	2:55
3.	"Don't Touch Her Body (If You Can't Touch Her Mind)"	Don Davis	3:13
4.	"I'm Gonna Keep On Loving You"	Don Davis, Richard Morris	4:00
5.	"You're the Best in the World"	Norma Toney	3:18
6.	"Running Out of Lies"	Perry Jordan	4:50
7.	"Somebody's Gettin' It"	Chico Jones, Clarence Coulter, Don Davis	4:01
8.	"It Don't Hurt Me Like It Used To"	Herbert Ross, Perry Jordan	3:13
9.	"Pick Up the Pieces"	Don Davis, Fred Briggs, Kent Barker	4:50
Total length:			34:45

== Personnel ==
- Johnnie Taylor – lead vocals
- Bruce Nazarian, Don Davis, Emmett Smith, Glen Goins, Jimmy Johnson – guitar
- David Hood, Michael Henderson, Bootsy Collins – bass
- Barry Beckett, Bernie Worrell, George Rountree, Melvin Griffin, Rudy Robinson – keyboards
- Jerry Jones, Richard "Pistol" Allen, Roger Hawkins, Zachary Slatter – drums
- Carl Austin and the Detroit Fisher Theatre Strings – strings, horns
- Eli Fontaine – alto saxophone
- Brandye – backing vocals
- Bobby Eaton – backing vocals arrangements
- Bernie Worrell, David Van De Pitte, Don Davis, Wade Marcus, Rudy Robinson, Sonny Sanders – arrangements

== Charts ==
Chart performance for Eargasm
Chart (1976)	Peak position
Canada Top Albums/CDs (RPM)	41
US Billboard 200	5
US Soul Albums (Billboard)	1

== Certifications ==
Region	Certification	Certified units/sales
United States (RIAA)	Platinum	1,000,000^{^}
^{^} Shipments figures based on certification alone.
