= Take Care of Your Homework =

1969 single by American singer Johnnie Taylor

"Take Care Of Your Homework"

Single by Johnnie Taylor
- A-side: "Take Care Of Your Homework"
- B-side: "Hold On This Time"
- Released: 1969
- Genre: Pop
- Length: 5:10
- Label: Stax Records
- Songwriter(s): Homer Banks, Don Davis, Raymond Jackson, T. Kelly

Johnnie Taylor singles chronology
"Who's Making Love" (1968)	"Take Care Of Your Homework" (1969)	"Testify (I Wanna)" (1969)

"Take Care Of Your Homework" is a single recorded by American singer Johnnie Taylor and released on the Stax label in early 1969. The single reached number two on the Billboard Hot R&B Singles chart and number twenty on the Billboard Hot 100. The song was written by Stax staffers Homer Banks, Don Davis, Raymond Jackson, and Thomas Kelly. The B-side featured the song "Hold On This Time", written by Homer Banks, Don Davis and Raymond Jackson.

== Tracks ==
1. "Take Care Of Your Homework" - 2:35
2. "Hold On This Time" - 2:35

== Chart positions ==
Chart (1968)	Peak position
Canada (RPM Top 100)	27
U.S. Billboard Hot 100	20
U.S. Billboard Hot Rhythm & Blues Singles	2
