= That Woman Is Poison! =

Studio album by Rufus Thomas
- Released: 1988
- Genres: Blues, soul
- Length: 36:57
- Label: Alligator
- Producer: Bob Greenlee

Rufus Thomas chronology
Rappin' Rufus (1986)	That Woman Is Poison! (1988)	Can't Get Away from This Dog (1992)

That Woman Is Poison! is an album by the American musician Rufus Thomas. Originally recorded for King Snake Records, the album was released in 1988 via Alligator Records. Thomas was in his seventies when he made That Woman Is Poison!

== Production ==
The backing band was put together by Bob Greenlee, the owner of King Snake. The musicians included the saxophonist Noble "Thin Man" Watts and the harmonica player Lazy Lester. That Woman Is Poison! was recorded in Sanford, Florida. Thomas asked Robert Palmer to write the liner notes. "The Walk" jokingly alludes to both Thomas's age and his previous dance hits "The Funky Chicken" and "Walking the Dog".

== Critical reception ==
Professional ratings
Review scores
Source	Rating
AllMusic	3/5 stars
The Encyclopedia of Popular Music	3/5 stars
The Rolling Stone Album Guide	3/5 stars

The Chicago Reader thought that Thomas "grinds out his blues with a sweaty crunch that puts to shame men 30 years his junior, and his sense of humor is as wicked as ever." The Crisis wrote that "Thomas uses a traditional blues sound, but struts his way through the vocals with a characteristic smirk." The Edmonton Journal determined that Thomas's "voice still contains the same rich textures as in the past, yet it lacks a sense of urgency."

The Globe and Mail called Thomas "still a great singer, with a full, throaty voice and a great sense of comic timing." The Sun Sentinel praised the "blistering" original songs, and wrote that the "horn work and arrangements are first rate." The Chicago Tribune concluded that, "despite his years, Thomas is in top voice and spirit as he blusters, struts, hams it up, deftly draws from both Memphis blues and soul."

AllMusic deemed it "a masterful comeback album from a blues and soul veteran who was assumed to be ready for the retirement home."

== Track listing ==
All tracks are written by Rufus Thomas, except where noted.

No.	Title	Writer(s)	Length
1.	"That Woman Is Poison!"		5:11
2.	"I Just Got to Know"	Bob Geddins, Jimmy McCracklin	3:20
3.	"Big Fine Hunk of Woman"		5:47
4.	"Blues in the Basement"		4:14
5.	"Somebody's Got to Go"	Gatemouth Moore	6:01
6.	"Breaking My Back"		6:02
7.	"The Walk"	Jimmy McCracklin	2:57
8.	"All Night Worker"		3:25

== Personnel ==
- Rufus Thomas – vocals
- Bryan Bassett, Ernie Lancaster – guitar
- Louis Villery – bass guitar
- Bob Greenlee – bass guitar, baritone saxophone
- Lucky Peterson – keyboards
- Danny Best – drums
- Kenny Neal – harmonica
- Noble "Thin Man" Watts – tenor saxophone solos
- Lawson "Buzz" Montsinger – tenor saxophone
- Sylvester Polk – trumpet
