= Bettye Crutcher =

American songwriter (1939–2022)

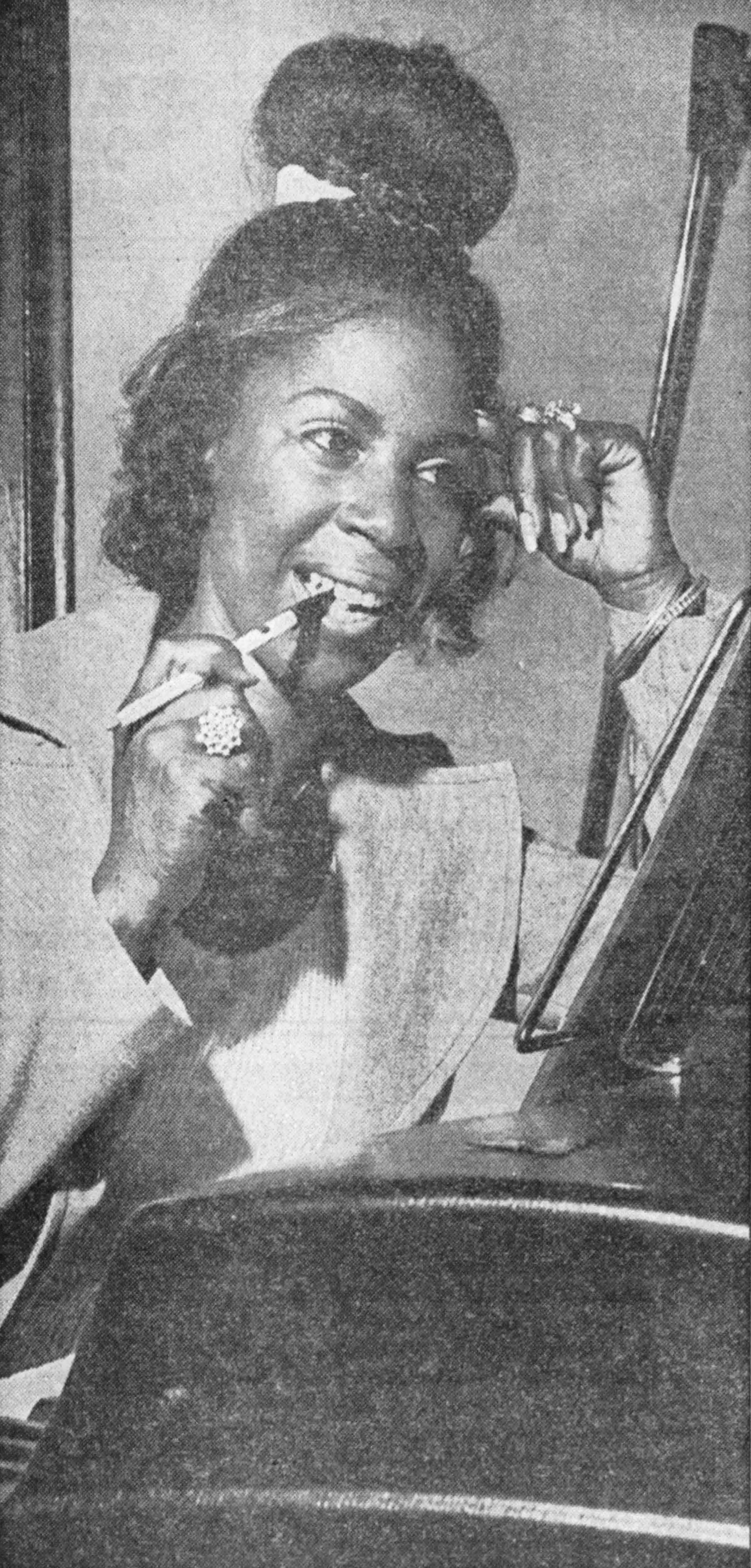
- Crutcher at Stax Recording Studio in 1974

Background information
- Born: Bettye Jean Crutcher; September 16, 1939; Memphis, Tennessee, U.S.
- Died: October 20, 2022 (aged 83) Nashville, Tennessee, U.S.
- Genres: Memphis soul
- Occupations: Singer; songwriter
- Labels: Stax

Bettye Jean Crutcher (September 16, 1939 – October 20, 2022) was an American songwriter. She was a staff writer for Stax Records. Crutcher teamed with Homer Banks and Raymond Jackson as We Three, and co-wrote "Who's Making Love" for Johnnie Taylor, which earned a nomination for the Grammy Award for Best R&B Song. Crutcher also wrote music for the Staple Singers, Sam & Dave, and Albert King.

== Early life and career ==
Crutcher was born in Memphis, Tennessee on September 16, 1939, and started writing poems as a child. She became a nurse and was a single parent of three children when she applied to work for various record labels. After being rejected by other labels, she joined Stax Records as a songwriter in 1967, becoming their only female staffer. In 2019, she said: "Being the only female songwriter for Stax was quite an event [...] They talk about the sexist '60s, and I really think the guys didn't think the girls could do that."

Crutcher wrote "Somebody's Sleeping in My Bed" for Johnnie Taylor, which made the R&B Top 40 in 1967. She teamed with Homer Banks and Raymond Jackson as the songwriting trio We Three. In their first year together, their work accounted for $6 million in sales ($48,580,977 in current dollar terms). We Three wrote "Who's Making Love" for Taylor, which was a Top 5 hit in 1968 and was nominated for Best R&B Song at the 1969 Grammy Awards.

In 1974, Crutcher recorded an album of her own, titled Long as You Love Me. She recorded the album with the Muscle Shoals Rhythm Section and the Memphis Symphony Orchestra and co-produced the album with Mack Rice. Crutcher and Rice also wrote the soundtrack for The Klansman in 1974. In addition, Crutcher wrote music with Marvell Thomas and Bobby Manuel. She wrote "The Ghetto", "We'll Get Over", and "The Challenge" for the Staple Singers, and recommended that "Respect Yourself" by Rice and Luther Ingram would work well for the group. Crutcher also wrote "I Like What You're Doing to Me" for Carla Thomas as well as songs for Sam & Dave, Ann Peebles, Otis Clay, and Albert King. Her songs were covered by Joan Baez, Buddy Guy, Paul Weller, and Sammy Davis Jr., and sampled by the Wu-Tang Clan, Diddy, and Mary J. Blige.

== Later life ==
After Stax went out of business, Crutcher worked in antiques and made jewelry. She moved to Nashville, Tennessee, in the 1980s and wrote songs for B.B. King and Bobby Bland.

Crutcher died in Nashville on October 20, 2022, at age 83.
