= Filet of Soul (Wisconsin band) =

American soul and psychedelic band

Filet of Soul was a Wisconsin-based band, primarily active from 1964 to the mid-1970s. The band is notable as being a white band that mixed soul and psychedelic music, and received airplay on black radio stations. It was also notable as having been produced by Lenny LaCour.

== History ==
The band was formed, as Attila and the Huns, in 1964, and originally based in Thorp, Wisconsin. Band members were drummer Rich Legault, bassist Denny Lewan, singer/guitarist Mike Peace and rhythm guitarist Ben Wisniewski The band became quite popular locally, releasing singles on Sara Records. In 1967, the band placed second in a battle of the bands contest in Wausau, Wisconsin. They were contacted by a manager in Milwaukee, but got lost on their way to see him. They ended up at Kennedy Studios in Milwaukee. They were introduced to Lenny LaCour by the studio's owner, Dave Kennedy. LaCour, who had relocated to Milwaukee from Chicago, was producing and managing local artists, such as Harvey Scales, and liked what he heard from the band.

LaCour was interested in Chess Records in financing the band's recordings. However, Chess refused to release the recordings, which LaCour then licensed and issued under his own record labels. LaCour also persuaded the band to rename themselves Filet of Soul. The first single, "Sweet Lovin", was blue-eyed soul, released in 1969 on LaCour's Dynamic Records, and was an immediate Wisconsin area hit.

In terms of the band's soul music directions, Mike Peace commented as follows:

My band, Attila and the Huns, were so impressed with Harvey Scales' live performance that we decided right then and there that we would start doing more soul music. We eventually became so good at it that we ended up changing the band name to Filet of Soul. Many of the recordings we did managed to fool the black radio station execs into playing our music on solid black stations. This was Lenny's idea. He knew he could promote a white band through his predominately black channels and he knew that he could also get plays on white stations as well.

LaCour released a 1969 follow-up single by the band on LaCour's Magic Touch Records, which was then followed by an album release in 1970, Freedom, on LaCour's Chicago-based Moniquid Records. Most of the songs were written in one evening, and the entire album was recorded in one twelve-hour session. LaCour contributed two songs to the album and co-wrote a third, with Mike Peace. The album is notable for its engineer, Dave Purple, previously a founding member of The Cryan' Shames and at the time working at Chess Records, following his military service. Purple went on to receive a Grammy Award for his engineering of the music to the movie Shaft. The album was reissued on CD in 2011 by Gear Fab Records.

The band's success was hampered by the fact that LaCour was unable to obtain a national distribution contract for his records. He expected that, if the song were popular locally, national distributors would come to him. In the case of Filet of Soul's records and those of other LaCour artists, such national distribution generally did not occur.

By the mid-1970s, the band had changed its name to Filet of Sound. Mike Peace and Denny Lewan later continued as solo acts.
