= The Uniques =

The Uniques may refer to:

- The Uniques (Jamaican group), a vocal group
- The Uniques (doo-wop group), a Chicago-based group
- The Uniques (Louisiana band), a Louisiana-based rock group

== See also ==
- Unique (disambiguation)
