= Uniq (disambiguation) =

uniq is a Unix utility to remove adjacent repetitions of lines.

Uniq may also refer to:

- UNIQ, a Mongolian computer brand
- Uniq plc, a chilled convenience food manufacturer in the UK
- UniQ, a collection of queer student groups at universities/polytechs throughout New Zealand
- uniQ (university), Quisqueya University in Haiti
- U-Niq (born 1976), Dutch rapper
- UNIQ (nightclub), a defunct nightclub in Helsinki, Finland
- UNIQ summer school, a summer school provided by the University of Oxford, UK, to support undergraduate access
- Uniq (band), a Chinese-South Korean boy group
- Ugli fruit, a citrus fruit sometimes called uniq fruit

== See also ==
- Unique (disambiguation)
