= Love-Itis =

Single by Harvey Scales and The Seven Sounds
- Released: 1967
- Genre: Soul
- Label: Magic Touch
- Songwriter(s): Harvey Scales, Albert Vance
- Producer(s): Lenny LaCour

Love-Itis is a song written by Harvey Scales and Albert Vance (with Rudy Jacobs also initially acknowledged as a co-writer), originally recorded by Harvey Scales and The Seven Sounds. The song was later recorded and popularized by The Sonics, Mandala and the J. Geils Band, among others.

== History ==
The song was originally released in 1967 by Harvey Scales and The Seven Sounds, on Magic Touch Records, owned by Lenny LaCour. At the time, the songwriting credit was shared between Harvey Scales and guitarist Rudy Jacobs, with the song published by LaCour's L. LaCour Music Inc. The song was later re-released in 1967 on Atlantic Records

A version of the song was recorded in 1967 by The Sonics, but not officially released at that time. The version was included in a Jerden Records 1996 compilation of Sonics material, Fire and Ice II: The 'Lost' Tapes

In 1968, the song was popularized by Mandala, as a single release from the band's only album, Soul Crusade, in an arrangement similar to that of The Sonics.

The song was popularized in 1975 by the J. Geils Band, being included on their album Hotline. Their version was described by one reviewer as a "barn-burning cover of...(a) soul nugget". It was also included on the band's 1976 live album, Blow Your Face Out. Record World called this performance "a contagious disease like the boogie woogie flu, but it's a bug you won't mind having."
