= Harvey Scales =

American singer-songwriter (1940–2019)

Harvey Scales (September 27, 1940 – February 11, 2019) was an American R&B and soul singer, songwriter, and producer. Scales had been active in the music industry since the 1960s, and composed songs for groups such as The Dells, The Dramatics, and The O'Jays. He is particularly notable for his co-authorship of the songs "Love-Itis" and "Disco Lady". Once called Milwaukee's "Godfather of Soul" by a local reporter, Scales credited James Brown and the sound of "funk" for influencing his music career.

== History ==
Scales was born in Osceola, Arkansas, and grew up in Milwaukee, Wisconsin, where he attended Roosevelt Middle School and North Division High School.

He was well known in Milwaukee, before his big break as a national songwriter. He was known as "Twistin' Harvey", in the early 1960s. In 1961, he and his longtime friend Albert James Vance (1943–2003) formed the group, Harvey Scales & The 7 Sounds, which released several singles.

Harvey Scales & The 7 Sounds initially recorded for Cuca Records, and later for Magic Touch Records, a Wisconsin-based label owned by Lenny LaCour. The band's one hit was "Get Down", backed with "Love-Itis", which reached No. 32 on the R&B charts in 1967.

The band signed with Chess Records in 1969, recording for the Cadet Concept Records division, with LaCour continuing as producer. In 1970, the group had a regional hit with the LaCour-produced "The Funky Yolk". Through his familiarity with producer Don Davis at Chess, Scales met singer Johnnie Taylor, who was at the time recording for Stax Records. Scales then moved from Cadet Concept to Stax, releasing several singles. Scales followed the career of Johnnie Taylor when Taylor moved to Columbia Records. As described by Ed Hogan:

"When Stax became inactive, Taylor signed with Columbia, retaining Davis' services. Recording at Davis' favorite studio (United Sound Studios in Detroit), the producer used the Impressions' "Gypsy Woman" and an African dancer he had seen on a vacation to Spain as a template for a partially finished song ("Disco Baby") that Scales had brought to him. Davis took it to (Bootsy) Collins and (Bernie) Worrell, who honed and tightened up the groove, while veteran arranger David Van De Pitte did the horn arrangements."

Scales received national recognition for co-writing with Don Davis and Albert Vance on the Billboard Hot 100 chart-topping single for Johnnie Taylor, "Disco Lady". "Disco Lady" was the very first platinum single in the history of the Recording Industry Association of America, selling over two million copies. It was certified platinum on April 22, 1976. As a result, Scales became -- and will always be -- one of the co-writers of the first platinum single record in America.

Scales is also notable as being the co-writer of "Love-Itis", a 1967 release by Harvey Scales & The 7 Sounds, which later was covered and was a hit for the Canadian band Mandala in 1968, and the J. Geils Band in 1975. The song was also covered by The Sonics, originally recorded in 1967.

Scales also co-wrote, with Bunny Sigler, "Once Is Not Enough", recorded by The O'Jays and, as sole composer, "Be For Real With Me", which was recorded by The Dells.

The success of "Disco Lady" enabled Scales to obtain a recording contract with Casablanca Records. At Casablanca, Scales recorded the first two albums of his career, Confidential Affair (1978) and Hot Foot: A Funque Dizco Opera (1979). Scales did not release another album for eighteen years, when he released Somebody Else's Somebody on Four Sight Records. In 2009, a compilation album of material by Harvey Scales and The Seven Sounds, recorded for Magic Touch Records, was released by Soul-Tay-Shus Records as Love-Itis: All the Rare & Unreissued 45's from the Vaults of Magic Touch: 1967-1977.

Harvey Scales died on February 11, 2019, at the age of 78.

== Discography ==
=== Studio albums ===
- Somebody Else’s Somebody (1997) (Four Sight)
- Hot Foot: A Funque Dizco Opera (1979) (Casablanca)
- Confidential Affair (1978) (Casablanca)

=== Singles ===
- Cuca
  - J-1132 Harvey (Twistin' Harvey) "The Clock/ Every Step Of The Way"
  - J-1155 Harvey & The Seven Sounds “Glamour Girl/New York City”
  - J-1271 Harvey & The Seven Sounds "Independency/ I Want To Apologize"
  - 1311 Harvey Scales & the Seven Sounds "Bootleg/ Monkeytime ‘67"
- Magic Touch
  - 2007 Harvey Scales & the Seven Sounds "Get Down/ Love-Itis" 1967
  - 16001 Harvey Scales & the Seven Sounds "Broadway Freeze/ I Can’t Cry No More" 1968
  - 2069 Harvey Scales & the Seven Sounds "(It’s Too Good) Too Good To Be True/ Love Is A Gas" 1969
  - 2072 Harvey Scales & the Seven Sounds "Don’t You Ever Let It End/ The Sound Of Soul" 1969
  - 2077 Harvey Scales & the Seven Sounds "Welcome Home/ Trackdown" 1969
  - 3002 Harvey Scales & the Seven Seas "Bump Your Thing/ Trying To Survive"
  - 7006 Harvey Scales "Groove On Sexy Lady/ Rock The World”
  - 9003 Harvey Scales "Follow The Disco Crowd/ Love Thief”
- Chess/Cadet Concept
  - Harvey Scales and the Seven Sounds "The Funky Yolk" 1970
- Earthtone
  - 508014X Harvey Scales "Single Girls/ Spend The Nite Forever"
- Casablanca
  - 954 Harvey Scales "Shake-A-Matic/?"
- Soul-Tay-Shus
  - STS CD 6363 Harvey Scales & the Seven Sounds "Love-Itis: All the Rare & Unreissued 45's from the Vaults of Magic Touch: 1967-1977" 2009
- Mercury
  - 72937 Harvey Scales "Shake Your Power/Sun Won't Come Out.

== Awards & Recognition ==
Scales received national recognition for co-writing with Don Davis and Albert Vance on the Billboard Hot 100 chart-topping single for Johnnie Taylor, "Disco Lady". "Disco Lady" was the very first platinum single in the history of the Recording Industry Association of America, selling over two million copies. It was certified platinum on April 22, 1976. As a result, Scales became -- and will always be -- one of the co-writers of the first platinum single record in America.

Exactly one year after his passing, iconic Milwaukee soul artist Harvey Scales was recognized for his musical achievements. The Milwaukee Mayor's office officially declared Feb. 13, 2020 as "Harvey Scales Day." Scales' son, Harvey Scales Jr., accepted the award on behalf of his late father at the Radio Milwaukee studios.

== Other sources ==
- Carter, Nick. "A Homecoming for R&B's Harvey Scales." (2004, October 1). Milwaukee Journal Sentinel, p. 1.
- Flyth, Shelton L. (2004, June 16). "June is Black Music month: Saluting Harvey Scales." New Journal & Guide, p. 1.
- Get Out - Best bets for the weekend and beyond. (2006, October 27). The Commercial Appeal, p. G.2.3.
