= Who's Making Love =

Single by Johnnie Taylor

from the album Who's Making Love...
- B-side: "I'm Trying"
- Released: October 1968
- Recorded: 1968
- Genre: Southern soul; northern soul
- Length: 2:47
- Label: Stax (STA-0009)
- Songwriter(s): Homer Banks; Bettye Crutcher; Don Davis; Raymond Jackson
- Producer(s): Don Davis

Johnnie Taylor singles chronology
"I Ain't Particular" (1968)	"Who's Making Love" (1968)	"Take Care of Your Homework" (1969)

"Who's Making Love" is a song written by Stax Records staffers Homer Banks, Bettye Crutcher, Don Davis and Raymond Jackson and recorded by singer Johnnie Taylor in 1968.

Released on the Stax label in the late summer of 1968, it became Taylor's breakthrough single, reaching number one on the US Billboard R&B chart and number five on the Billboard Hot 100. It became one of the few singles Taylor would become primarily known for in the mainstream. The song featured the Stax house band, Booker T. & the M.G.'s, and Isaac Hayes (on keyboards). It was Taylor's best-selling single before the release of "Disco Lady" almost a decade later.

According to Bettye Crutcher, the lyrics were inspired by the 1920s novelty song, "Who Takes Care of the Caretaker's Daughter (While the Caretaker's Busy Taking Care)".

== Chart history ==
Chart (1968–69)	Peak position
Canada (RPM Top 100)	7
U.S. Billboard Hot 100	5
U.S. Billboard Hot R&B singles	1

== Cover versions ==
- Tony Joe White covered the song on his 1968 album Black and White.
- Young-Holt Unlimited released a cover on the album Soulful Strut in 1968 and as a single in 1969 (#47 Canada), both on Brunswick Records.
- The Blues Brothers released a cover version as a single in 1980, which reached number 39 on the US chart.
- Christian McBride included the song in his 2013 album Out Here.
- The Nation Funktasia covered the song on their 1991 album In Search of the Last Trump of Funk.
