= Lenny LaCour =

Lenny LaCour (born Leonard James LaCour Sr., April 27, 1932, Bayou Brevelle, Louisiana, United States) is an American record producer, songwriter and performer, particularly active from the mid-1950s to the mid-1970s. He is particularly notable as the producer of the principal recordings of singer Harvey Scales.

== History ==
LaCour was born in 1932 in Louisiana, where his parents were corn and cotton farmers on the Isle of Brevelle. The location, near the Cane River, later became well known as the site location for the film Steel Magnolias.

Lenny LaCour's career in music initially commenced as a performer and songwriter, based in Chicago. LaCour's Creole heritage enabled him to move freely between Chicago's black and white nightclubs during the early 1950s. "There were only two people doing that," LaCour has said. The other was Leonard Chess, owner of Chess Records. In 1952, he auditioned for Leonard Chess, who rejected him, stating in the presence of Muddy Waters and LaCour that Chess Records did not produce white artists. Waters is reported to have said, "Mr. Chess, he's got a whole lot of soul in his voice."

From 1952 to 1956, LaCour released several singles on the Chicago-based All American, Spin and Meteor labels. As described by Dik De Heer:

LaCour's break came in 1956, when he won a Chicago jingle contest for Orange Crush, the soda bottling subsidiary of Pepsi-Cola. Under the name of King Creole, he performed a series of TV and radio spots for Orange Crush and soon singles of "Rock 'n' Roll Romance" were distributed with every Crush sixpack. This project was tied into a recording contract with Frank McGovern's Academy Records label, recording under his given name, Lenny LaCour.

"Rock 'n' Roll Romance" was LaCour's biggest hit, described by LaCour as "the only million seller not to be on the Billboard charts". The record is highly collectible; LaCour no longer owns a personal copy, having sold all of his own copies to a record collector.

LaCour trademarked the name "King Creole" in 1952, and has asserted that a chance meeting with Elvis Presley was the inspiration for the title of the Presley movie King Creole.

In 1958, LaCour established his own publishing company and, in 1959, he started his first record label, Lucky Four Records, where LaCour was the songwriter, arranger, producer and main artist. He recorded under the name "Big Rocker". He also produced other groups, most notably the doo-wop groups the Swinging Hearts and The Uniques. Other labels that LaCour founded in Chicago were Score Records, Busy Bee Records and Dynamic Sound Records.

In 1964, LaCour moved to Milwaukee, Wisconsin, where he founded Magic Touch Records and, subsequently, Dynamic Sound Records. labels, letting Lucky Four Records in Chicago become defunct. In Milwaukee, LaCour had more success recording local acts than in Chicago, particularly in relation to Harvey Scales, who co-wrote and released "Love-Itis" and was the later co-writer of "Disco Lady".

In 1969, LaCour produced the band, Filet of Soul (previously known as Attila and The Huns), which was a white band that mixed soul and psychedelic music.

In the late 1970s, LaCour returned to Chicago, and resurrected the Magic Touch label. He thereafter released a number of unsuccessful disco records on Magic Touch. LaCour continues to operate the label.

The success of LaCour and his artists was hampered by the fact that LaCour was unable to obtain a national distribution contract for his records. He expected that, if the song were popular locally, national distributors would come to him. Such national distribution generally did not occur.

LaCour is also credited with encouraging the career direction of Eddie Blazonczyk. Lacour initially recording Blazonczyk as a rockabilly artist known as Eddie Bell, but encouraged Blazonczyk to return to polka music, at the age of 22. Blazonczyk has said "I took his advice, and never regretted it."

In 2008, the album Walkin' The Bullfrog (Night Train International) was released, which provided a career overview of Lenny LaCour's solo recordings.
