= Another Polka Celebration =

Studio album by Eddie Blazonczyk
- Released: 1986
- Studio: Bel-Aire Recording Studios
- Genre: Polka

Eddie Blazonczyk chronology
A Polka Celebration (1985)	Another Polka Celebration (1986)	Let's Celebrate Again (1987)

Another Polka Celebration is an album by Eddie Blazonczyk. In 1986, the album won Blazonczyk the Grammy Award for Best Polka Recording.

== See also ==
- Polka in the United States
