= Homer Banks =

American soul singer-songwriter (1941–2003)

Background information
- Born: August 2, 1941; Memphis, Tennessee, U.S.
- Died: April 3, 2003 (aged 61) Memphis, Tennessee, U.S.
- Genres: Soul, Northern soul
- Occupations: Singer, songwriter
- Years active: 1957–2003
- Labels: Stax, Minit

Homer Banks (August 2, 1941 – April 3, 2003) was an American songwriter, singer and record producer. Although best known by many for his songwriting for Stax Records in the 1960s and 1970s, some of his own releases from the 1960s are considered classics on the Northern Soul scene. Many of the songs he wrote have become contemporary classics.

== Life ==
Banks was born in Memphis, Tennessee, United States, and at the age of 16 formed the Soul Consolidators gospel group which toured around the southern states, often performing his own material. After military service, he returned to Memphis in 1964, and started a singing career with the small Genie label where he met Isaac Hayes and David Porter. Soon, Stax founder Estelle Axton hired him to work at the record shop attached to the company's Satellite Studios, where he stayed for three years, also recording for the Minit label. His three consecutive releases, "A Lot of Love", "60 Minutes of Your Love" (both 1966), and "Hooked By Love " (1967), all found success in England, eventually becoming Northern soul classics. "A Lot of Love" formed the musical basis of the Spencer Davis Group hit single "Gimme Some Lovin'" released in October 1966. In 1999, "A Lot of Love" was covered by the British band Simply Red and released as "Ain't That a Lot of Love".

Jim Stewart at Stax refused to give Banks a contract as a singer, but eventually Stax did give him a songwriting contract. He began working with co-writer Allen Jones, placing songs with Johnnie Taylor and Sam and Dave, and also writing "I Can't Stand Up for Falling Down", later a UK hit for Elvis Costello. Banks had greater success with the Staple Singers, writing their first Stax single "Long Walk to DC", and then some of their biggest hits including "If You're Ready (Come Go with Me)".

In 1968, he formed a songwriting trio with Bettye Crutcher and Raymond Jackson, calling themselves We Three. Their first song was "Who's Making Love", which was recorded by Johnnie Taylor and became a no. 3 pop hit and no. 1 R&B hit, Stax's biggest. Banks also wrote, with Jackson and Carl Hampton, "(If Loving You Is Wrong) I Don't Want to Be Right", a song first recorded by The Emotions which became a hit when recorded by Luther Ingram, and later recorded by Isaac Hayes and Millie Jackson and many other singers, including Barbara Mandrell, Rod Stewart and Cassandra Wilson.

Banks' twin brother James also worked for Stax, co-writing the company's last big hit, Shirley Brown's "Woman to Woman".

After Stax folded, Homer Banks and Carl Hampton signed a publishing deal with A&M Records and moved to California, where they continued to write but with less success. In 1977, as Banks and Hampton, they recorded the album Passport to Ecstasy for Warner Bros. Records. In the 1980s, Banks formed the Two's Company recording company with Lester Snell, which released albums by J. Blackfoot and Ann Hines. In 1983, Banks, Reginald Jenkins and Chuck Brooks formed Sound Town Records, Inc. and released the top twenty album on J. Blackfoot titled City Slicker. It included the R&B top five single "Taxi" and also debuted on the Billboard Hot 100, which he wrote and produced with Chuck Brooks. Banks and Brooks also produced the Intimate Storm album on the Sound Town Records label, which included four singles that made the Billboard R&B chart. All of these songs were produced for World Production Company formed and owned by Banks, Reginald (Reggie) Jenkins and Chuck Brooks.

Homer Banks died in Memphis of cancer, aged 61.

== Compositions ==
With Carl Hampton, he co-wrote "I've Got a Feeling (We'll Be Seeing Each Other Again)", which was recorded by Al Wilson. The song was produced by Marc Gordon and arranged by H.B. Barnum. The B-side "Be Concerned" was produced by Herbert Santifer. The record made it to number 43 on the Billboard Hot 100 on July 26, 1976. Together, Banks and Hampton also wrote "(Too Little in Common to Be Lovers) Too Much Going to Say Goodbye" for The Newcomers (1974). The track was heavily sampled for Aaliyah's 2001 song "I Care 4 U".
