= I Believe in You (You Believe in Me) =

Single by Johnnie Taylor

from the album Taylored in Silk
- B-side: "Love Depression"
- Released: June 1973
- Genre: Soul
- Length: 4:32 (original single version); 3:58 (second single version); 5:07 (album version)
- Label: Stax
- Songwriter(s): Don Davis
- Producer(s): Don Davis

Johnnie Taylor singles chronology
"Stop Doggin' Me" (1972)	"I Believe in You (You Believe in Me)" (1973)	"Cheaper to Keep Her" (1973)

"I Believe in You (You Believe in Me)" is a song written and produced by Don Davis and recorded by Johnnie Taylor. The single was also certified gold by the RIAA for sales of one million copies.

== Background ==
Davis had originally begun writing the song in 1965. When he found himself two songs short while working to complete Taylor's LP Taylored in Silk, Davis chose "I Believe in You (You Believe in Me)" as one of the songs to fill out the album. The basic track was cut at Muscle Shoals Sound in Alabama with members of its famed rhythm section: bassist David Hood, drummer Roger Hawkins, guitarist Jimmy Johnson, keyboardist Barry Beckett, and Davis later overdubbed strings at United Sound Recording Studio, the recording studio in Detroit that he had bought in 1971.

== Chart performance ==
Released as a single in the summer of 1973, "I Believe in You (You Believe in Me)" was one of the biggest hits of Taylor's career, holding the #1 spot on Billboard's Hot Soul Singles Chart for two weeks, reaching the #11 position on the Billboard Hot 100 chart, and #35 in Canada.
