= Chicken (dance) =

Popular rhythm and blues dance

The chicken is a popular rhythm and blues dance that originated in the United States in the 1950s, in which the dancers flap their arms and kick back their feet in an imitation of a chicken. The dance features lateral body movements. It was used primarily as a change of pace step while doing the twist. The chicken dance gained popularity when Rufus Thomas wrote "Do the Funky Chicken", a hit record in 1970.

== Legacy ==
In the 1960s the Chicken gave rise to The Frug, showcased in Bob Fosse's choreography.

It is featured in the 1980s original Blues Brothers musical comedy film directed by John Landis and starring John Belushi and Dan Aykroyd.

It is mentioned in the 1997 Chicago Tribune column "Advice, like youth, probably just wasted on the young" by Mary Schmich, and in 1999 was made into a well-known song by Baz Luhrmann titled "Wear Sunscreen".
