= All American Records =

All American Records was a record label, originally based in Chicago and ultimately owned by Bill Holmes, who was also the manager and producer of Strawberry Alarm Clock.

Among its artists was Lenny LaCour, who later became a manager, producer and record label owner in his own right. The label included the band Birmingham Sunday, whose sole album, A Message from Birmingham Sunday is a highly sought after item by record collectors.
