= (Do the) Push and Pull =

"(Do The) Push and Pull (Part 1)"

Single by Rufus Thomas

from the album Rufus Thomas Live: Doing the Push & Pull at P.J.'s
- B-side: "(Do The) Push and Pull" (Part 2)
- Released: 1970
- Genre: R&B
- Length: 3:14
- Label: Stax
- Songwriter: Rufus Thomas
- Producers: Al Bell, Tom Nixon

Rufus Thomas singles chronology
| "The Preacher and the Bear" (1970) | "(Do The) Push and Pull (Part 1)" (1970) | "The World Is Round" (1971) |

"(Do The) Push and Pull (Part 1)" is a 1970 single on Stax Records by singer Rufus Thomas. The song was written by Thomas, and the recording was arranged by Carl Hampton, and produced by Al Bell and Tom Nixon.

This was the first and only number-one song for Thomas, who had first hit the R&B chart in 1953. The song was at the top of the Billboard Best Selling Soul Singles chart for two weeks in February 1971. The single also reached the Top 30 on the pop chart, peaking at number 25.

== Chart performance ==
| Chart (1971) | Peak position |
|---|---|
| U.S. Billboard Hot 100 | 25 |
| U.S. Billboard Best Selling Soul Singles | 1 |
