= Eddie Blazonczyk =

American polka musician (1941–2012)

- Born: July 12, 1941; Chicago, Illinois
- Died: May 21, 2012 (aged 70) Palos Heights, Illinois
- Genres: Polka, rockabilly
- Instruments: vocalist, electric bass
- Labels: Bel-Aire Records, Mercury Records, Versa Records, Lucky Four Records

Eddie Blazonczyk, Sr. (July 12, 1941 – May 21, 2012) was an American polka vocalist who joined forces with the band The Versatones. He was inducted into the International Polka Hall of Fame in 1970, and was a 1998 National Heritage Fellowship recipient. He has been called "one of the most important figures in the creation of the contemporary Polish-American polka sound". He released more than 60 albums.

== History ==
Eddie Blazonczyk was born in Chicago, Illinois, to Polish immigrant parents of Goral heritage.

Before becoming a polka artist, and founding Chicago-based Bel-Aire Records in 1963, Eddie Blazonczyk recorded under the name Eddy Bell for Mercury Records, Versa Records, and Lucky Four Records, all three labels based in Chicago. During this period Blazonczyk toured with Buddy Holly, Gene Vincent and Brenda Lee. The records he made for these labels were rockabilly sides, and novelty songs. "The Great Great Pumpkin", released on Lucky Four #1012, is probably the most noteworthy of these recordings. This recording is still occasionally heard around Halloween and is highly sought by record collectors. Lenny LaCour, the owner of Lucky Four Records, encouraged Blazonczyk, at the age of 22, to specialize in polka music, rather than to continue as a rockabilly singer. Blazonczyk has said, "I took his advice, and never regretted it."

He is credited with inventing the rhythmic polka subgenre known as "Chicago push," although ironically the name given to the style comes from bands who came after and were inspired by Blazonczyk, notably the Chicago Push. Musicologist Norm Cohen wrote that "in his illustrious career, Blazonczyk and his Versatones were the primary ambassadors of Polish-American polka, touring constantly and playing well over 200 road gigs per year."

The Versatones played a mix of both traditional and original tunes, with Blazonczyk singing in both Polish and English. The band consisted of a fiddler and concertina player, two trumpeter/clarinetists, a drummer and Blazonczyk himself on vocals and electric bass. Though his focus remained on the polka genre, Blazonczyk was a fan of rock, country, bluegrass and Cajun music and liked to incorporate those styles into his music when he felt it was appropriate.

Blazonczyk retired from performing in 2002. At that time, he turned over responsibility for his band, The Versatones, to his son, Eddie Blazonczyk Jr. The Versatones played their last performance on New Year's Eve, 2011.

== Death ==
Blazonczyk died of multiple organ dysfunction syndrome on May 21, 2012.

== Awards and honors ==
Blazonczyk was nominated for 11 Grammy Awards, and his album Another Polka Celebration won the 1986 Grammy for Best Polka Recording. He was a recipient of the 1998 National Heritage Fellowship awarded by the National Endowment for the Arts, which is the highest honor in the folk and traditional arts in the United States.

== Discography ==
- Live and Kickin' 2001
- Another Day At The Office 2000
- Smokin' Polkas 1999
- Shakin' not Stirred 1998
- Holiday Favorites 1997
- Greatest Hits-Vol 2 1997
- Music, Music, Music 1996
- Polkatime-20 Of The Greatest Hits 1996
- Better Than Ever 1995
- Always, Forever And A Day 1994
- A New Batch Of Polkas 1993
- All American Polkas 1992
- All Around The World 1991
- Everybody Polka 1990
- Good Ol' Days 1989
- 25th Anniversary Album 1988
- Let's Celebrate Again 1987
- Another Polka Celebration 1985 (1986 Grammy Winner)
- Polka Fireworks 1984
- Polka Thriller 1983
- Custom Made Polkas 1982
- Polka Medley Album 1982
- Polka Music's Here To Stay 1981
- Polka Festival 1981
- Hawaiian Polka Tour 1980
- Polka Cruise 1980
- More Honky Style Polkas Vol 3 1979
- Roaring Polkas 1978
- Wide World Of Polkas 1977
- Award Winning Polkas 1977
- Polka Jamboree 1976
- We Were Made For Each Other 1976
- Polka Spotlite 1976
- A Polka Christmas 1975
- Polka Concert 1975
- More Honky Style Polkas Vol 2 1974
- More Country Flavored Polkas Vol 2 1974
- Polka Hits 1973
- Langer Sisters Meet Eddie Blazonczyk's Versatones 1972
- Country Flavored Polkas 1972
- Honkey Style Polkas 1971
- Polka Music Hall Of Fame 1971
- Something A Little Bit Different 1970
- America's Most Wanted Polka Band 1969
- Polkas A Plenty 1969
- Poland European Tour 1968
- Let's Hear A Polka 1967
- Polish Party 1967
- Christmas Time 1966
- Happy Polka Music 1966
- Po Staro Krajsku- Old Country Style Vol 2 1966
- Polka Tour 1965
- Musically Yours 1965
- Po Staro Krajsku- Old Country Style 1964
- Something New Just For You 1964
- Here Come The Versatones 1963
- Polka Parade 1963
