= Unique =

Unique primarily refers to:

- Uniqueness, a state or condition wherein something is unlike anything else
- In mathematics and logic, a unique object is the only object with a certain property, see Uniqueness quantification

Unique may also refer to:

== Companies ==
- Unique Art, an American toy company
- Unique Broadcasting Company, a former name of UBC Media Group, based in London
- Unique Business News a television news channel in Taiwan
- Unique Mobility, a former name of UQM Technologies, a manufacturing company based in the United States
- Unique Pub Company, a pub company based in the United Kingdom, acquired by Enterprise Inns
- Unique Theater, a theater in Minneapolis, Minnesota, United States
- Unique Group, a conglomerate in Bangladesh

== Music ==
- Unique (DJ Encore album)
- Unique (Juliette Schoppmann album)
- Unique (band), a musical group from New York City
- Unique (also known as Darren Styles), British musician
- Unique Records, a former name of RKO/Unique Records
- Unique Recording Studios, a recording studio in New York City
- Unique (musician), a musician and singer-songwriter based in Philippines

== Other ==
- UNIQUe Certification, a label awarded to higher education institutions
- HMS Unique, name of three ships of the Royal Navy
- Operation Unique, code-name of criminal proceedings linked to the Pitcairn sexual assault trial of 2004
- Team Unique, a synchronized skating team from Finland
- Unique, Iowa, a hamlet in Iowa, United States
- Wade "Unique" Adams, a character in the television series Glee

== See also ==
- Essentially unique
- Sui generis
- The Uniques (disambiguation)
- Uniq (disambiguation)
