= The Gardenias =

- Origin: Alton, Illinois, U.S.
- Genres: R&B
- Years active: 1956-1957
- Label: Federal Records
- Past members: Luther Ingram; Archie Ingram; Richard Ingram; Lawrence Witherspoon; Connie Perry

The Gardenias were an American doo-wop group led by singer Luther Ingram. Backed by bandleader Ike Turner, they recorded for Federal Records in 1956.

== History ==
Formed in Alton, Illinois, the group consisted of Luther Ingram singing lead, his brothers Archie Ingram and Richard Ingram, Lawrence Witherspoon, and Connie Perry. They started off as a gospel group known as the Alton Crusaders before venturing into R&B as the Gardenias. On September 13, 1956, they recorded for Federal Records in Cincinnati. The group record four songs: "My Baby's Tops", "Flaming Love", "(All Alone And) Miserable", and "You Found The Time". They were accompanied by Ike Turner and his Kings of Rhythm for the session. Their first and only single "Flaming Love" / "My Baby's Tops" was released in November 1956. After the release, the group occasionally sang with Turner and continued singing gospel until they disbanded the following year.

== Discography ==
=== Singles ===
- 1956: "Flaming Love" / "My Baby's Tops" (Federal 12284)

=== Album appearances ===
- 1991: Ike Turner Kings Of Rhythm – Trailblazer (Charly R&B)
- 2010: Ike Turner – That Kat Sure Could Play! The Singles 1951-1957 (Secret Records Limited)
