= Raymond Jackson (songwriter) =

American songwriter

Raymond Earl Jackson (September 11, 1941 – November 10, 1972) was an American rhythm and blues songwriter, guitarist and record producer. His most successful songs, mostly written at Stax Records in the late 1960s and early 1970s, were "Who's Making Love", co-written with Homer Banks and Bettye Crutcher; "(If Loving You Is Wrong) I Don't Want to Be Right", and "If You're Ready (Come Go With Me)", both co-written with Banks and Carl Hampton.

== Life ==
Jackson grew up in Memphis, Tennessee. With his friend and lifelong musical partner Homer Banks, he formed his first group, the Soul Consolators, in his teens, and the pair wrote the group's songs together. After serving in the US Army between 1966 and 1968, he renewed his songwriting partnership with Banks, who had begun working at Stax Records. They wrote Johnnie Taylor's 1968 single "Next Time", before joining with a new, fellow songwriter Bettye Crutcher to write "Who's Making Love". Jackson also played guitar on the record, which became Taylor's biggest early hit, reaching no. 1 on the Billboard R&B chart and no. 5 on the Hot 100.

The songwriting trio of Jackson, Banks, and Crutcher remained together for the next two years, calling themselves We Three They were able to make more hits with compositions including Taylor's "Take Care Of Your Homework" and "I Could Never Be President"; and Carla Thomas' "I Like What You're Doing (To Me)". Jackson and Banks then worked with Carl Hampton to write further hits for The Staple Singers, Luther Ingram, The Emotions and others. These included "(If Loving You Is Wrong) I Don't Want to Be Right", first recorded by Ingram on Johnnie Baylor's KoKo label, which was distributed by Stax. Ingram's version made no. 1 on the R&B chart in 1972. The song was later recorded by many other artists including (the unrelated) Millie Jackson. Jackson also co-wrote Ingram's "I'll Be Your Shelter (In Time Of Storm)"; and the Staple Singers' "If You're Ready (Come Go With Me)" and "Touch a Hand, Make a Friend".

Raymond Jackson died as a result of a house fire in November 1972, at the age of 31.

== Family ==
Jackson's sons, Raymond Earl Jackson Jr. and Cornelius Jackson, are also musicians, who formed We Three Productions with Jimi Hill in 2020. His brother Robert Jackson worked as an engineer at Stax Records, and later worked at Ardent Studio and as Isaac Hayes' manager.
