= Walking the Dog (album) =

1963 debut studio album by Rufus Thomas

Studio album by Rufus Thomas
- Released: 1963
- Recorded: August 1962, October 1962, August–October 1963
- Genre: Rhythm and blues
- Length: 29:38
- Label: Stax
- Producer: Jim Stewart

Rufus Thomas chronology
Walking the Dog (1963)	Do the Funky Chicken (1970)

Singles from Walking the Dog
- 1. "The Dog" Released: 1963; 2. "Walking the Dog" Released: 1963; 3. "Can Your Monkey Do the Dog" Released: 1964

Professional ratings
Review scores
Source	Rating
AllMusic	4.5/5 stars

Walking the Dog is the debut studio album by American R&B singer Rufus Thomas from Memphis, Tennessee. It was released in 1963 through Stax Records with distribution by Atlantic. The album peaked at number 138 on the Billboard 200 albums chart in the United States. It spawned three hit singles: "The Dog", "Walking the Dog" and "Can Your Monkey Do the Dog", which made it to the Billboard Hot 100 singles chart at No. 87, No. 10 and No. 48 respectively.

== Track listing ==
No.	Title	Writer(s)	Length
1.	"The Dog"	Rufus Thomas	2:33
2.	"Mashed Potatoes"	Dessie Rozier	2:16
3.	"Ooh-Poo-Pah-Doo"	Jessie Hill	2:30
4.	"You Said"	Rufus Thomas	2:30
5.	"Boom Boom"	John Lee Hooker	2:42
6.	"It's Aw'rite"	Rufus Thomas	2:45
7.	"Walking the Dog"	Rufus Thomas	2:30
8.	"Ya Ya"	Lee Dorsey; Morris Levy; Morgan Robinson; Clarence Lewis	2:10
9.	"Land of 1000 Dances"	Chris Kenner; Fats Domino	2:32
10.	"Can Your Monkey Do the Dog"	Rufus Thomas; Steve Cropper	1:53
11.	"Cause I Love You"	Rufus Thomas	2:45
12.	"I Want to Be Loved"	Rufus Thomas	2:32
Total length:			29:38

== Chart history ==
Chart (1964)	Peak position
US Billboard 200	138
