= Carl Hampton =

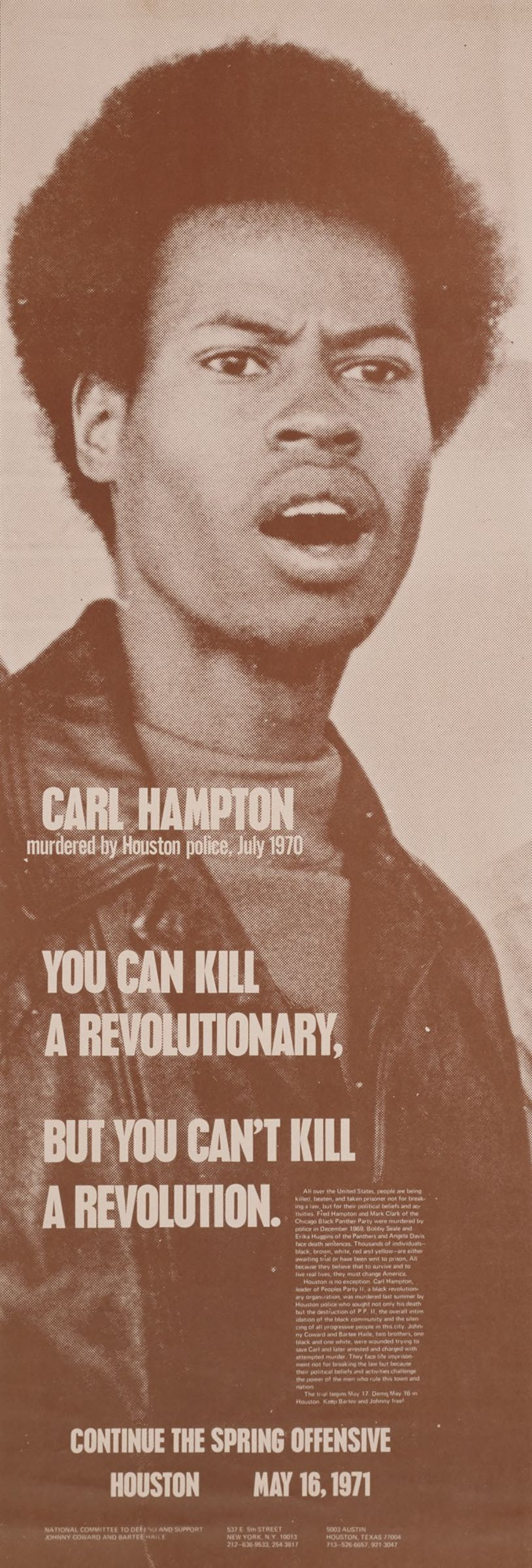
Hampton on a 1971 poster

Carl Hampton (December 17, 1948 – July 26, 1970) was a civil rights leader and head of the People's Party II, a precursor to the Houston chapter of the Black Panther Party. During his time leading the organization, the local chapter established community programs to offer food and medicine to Black Houstonians.

Hampton was killed at the age of 21 by gunfire discharged by Houston Police Department officers from a rooftop near the People's Party II headquarters located at the 2800 block of Dowling Street (known today as Emancipation Boulevard). The incident leading to Hampton's death began on July 17, when police surrounded the headquarters after a series of minor incidents, leading to a ten-day standoff that would end in a gun fight. Throughout the standoff, community members rallied to show support and raise bail for the activists.

Much of Houston's Black community cast doubt on the police version of events surrounding Hampton's death, as more than 30 groups called for, among other demands, the firing of the police chief Herman Short. A grand jury chose not to indict. Discussion of the circumstances of his death continue in the Houston community.
