= Peace Be Still (James Cleveland album) =

Live album by James Cleveland and the Angelic Choir
- Released: 1963
- Recorded: September 19, 1963
- Genre: Gospel
- Length: 44:36
- Label: Savoy Records
- Producer: Fred Mendelsohn

James Cleveland and the Angelic Choir chronology
How Great Thou Art, Vol. 2 (1962)	Peace Be Still (1963)	I Stood on the Banks of the Jordan, Vol. 4 (1964)

Professional ratings
Review scores
Source	Rating
Allmusic	link

Peace Be Still is the live album of gospel singer James Cleveland and The Angelic Choir of the First Baptist Church of Nutley, NJ, a choir directed by Rev. Lawrence Roberts. It was recorded on September 19, 1963, at Trinity Seventh Day Adventist Church in Newark, NJ, and released in 1964 under Savoy Records. With sales of over 1 million copies, it is one of the best-selling gospel albums of all time.

== Track listing ==
All tracks written or arranged by James Cleveland unless noted.

1. "Peace Be Still" - 6:06
2. "Jesus Saves" - 10:26
3. "I Had a Talk with God" - 4:15
4. "Where He Leads Me" (traditional) - 3:31
5. "Shine on Me" (traditional) - 7:09
6. "The Lord Brought Us Out" - 3:47
7. "I'll Wear a Crown" - 5:45
8. "I'll Be Caught Up to Meet Him" - 4:39
9. "Praise God" (traditional) - 2:11
