= Walking the Dog =

1963 single by Rufus Thomas

Single by Rufus Thomas

from the album Walking the Dog
- B-side: "Fine and Mellow"
- Released: September 1963
- Genre: R&B
- Length: 2:30
- Label: Stax
- Songwriter: Rufus Thomas
- Producer: Jim Stewart

Rufus Thomas singles chronology
"The Dog" (1963)	"Walking the Dog" (1963)	"Can Your Monkey Do the Dog" (1964)

Official audio
- " Walking the Dog" on YouTube

"Walking the Dog" (or "Walkin' the Dog") is a song written and performed by Rufus Thomas. It was released on his 1963 album Walking the Dog. It was his signature hit and also his biggest, reaching number 10 on the Billboard Hot 100 in December 1963 and remaining on the chart for 14 weeks.

== Background ==
The start of the Rufus Thomas version quotes the first 14 notes of the Wedding March from Mendelssohn's A Midsummer Night's Dream. This version is noted for Rufus whistling and calling out for his dog, to go walking with him. The lyrics also reference children's nursery rhymes, especially Mary Mack.

== The Dennisons recording ==
The only hit version in the UK was by the Dennisons, whose recording reached number 36 on the UK Singles Chart in 1964.

== Releases ==
The song was recorded several months later by the Rolling Stones in 1964. Unlike most Stones' recordings, the song features harmony vocals on the chorus solely by Brian Jones (most early Stones songs feature Jones and Bill Wyman on backing vocals, with Keith Richards replacing the two not long after), which makes their recording of the song unique in their catalogue. Many other artists have recorded the song, including Aerosmith, Johnny Rivers, John Cale, Georgie Fame and the Blue Flames, Roger Daltrey, Green Day, Hans Theessink, the Flamin' Groovies, the Kingsmen, the Sonics, the Lincolns, Ace Cannon, Jackie Shane, the Trashmen, Luv'd Ones, Bob Paisley and the Southern Grass, and Ratt. It was performed live occasionally by the Grateful Dead in 1966, 1970 and the mid-1980s.

Year	Artist	Album
1963	Rufus Thomas	Walking the Dog
1964	The Rolling Stones	The Rolling Stones
1964	The Excels	45 only
1964	Johnny Rivers	At the Whisky à Go Go
1965	The Kingsmen	The Kingsmen Volume II
1965	The Sonics	Here Are the Sonics
1966	Mitch Ryder and the Detroit Wheels	Breakout...!!!
1966	The Everly Brothers	Beat & Soul
1966	Davy Graham	Midnight Man
1967	Ace Cannon	Memphis Golden Hits
1969	Sandie Shaw	Reviewing the Situation
1971	The Flamin' Groovies	Teenage Head
1973	Aerosmith	Aerosmith
1975	Rick Derringer	Spring Fever
1975	Roger Daltrey	Ride a Rock Horse
1975	Michel Pagliaro	Pagliaro I (and Pagliaro, "Faire le trottoir" in French)
1975	Spirit	Spirit of '76
1976	Dr. Feelgood	Stupidity
1977	Hurriganes	Domestic release: Tsugu Way (International: Use No Hooks)
1977	The New Mickey Mouse Club	The All New Mickey Mouse Club Original TV Cast Album
1979	John Cale	Sabotage/Live
1983	Ratt	Ratt
1983	The Lincolns	
1991	Dave Stewart & Barbara Gaskin	Spin
1993	Green Day	Demos tape for Dookie
1993	Run C&W	Into the Twangy-First Century
1994	Kidsongs	Boppin' with the Biggles
1998	Jason & the Scorchers	Midnight Roads & Stages Seen
1998	The Trashmen	Bird Call!: The Twin City Stomp of the Trashmen
2009	Tony Spinner	Rollin' & Tumblin'
2013	American Dog & Fin	Dogatized (song's title changed to "Rocking the Dog")
2015	Schizophrenic Spacers	Live version from "Macumba: Live at Last"
2017	Jackie Shane	Any Other Way
2025	Amelie	America's Backyard
