= The Uniques (doo-wop group) =

Chicago-based doo-wop group

The Uniques were a Chicago-based doo-wop group, active in the early 1960s, recorded by Lenny LaCour, and signed to Demand/Dot Records.
