= Lucky Four Records =

Lucky Four Records was a Chicago-based record company, located at 5411 W. Diversey Avenue, that existed from 1960 to 1963. The label was founded and owned by Lenny LaCour, who was also a singer, songwriter, and record producer.

Lucky Four Records appears to have released only 45 rpm singles; some by LaCour himself, others by such artists as The Swinging Hearts, The Belvederes, and Eddy Bell. All Lucky Four releases are considered collectible, with #1012, "The Great Great Pumpkin", a Halloween novelty song by Eddy Bell particularly sought after.

== See also ==
- List of record labels
