= Noble "Thin Man" Watts =

Noble "Thin Man" Watts (February 17, 1926 – August 24, 2004) was an American blues, jump blues and rhythm and blues saxophonist. He primarily played tenor saxophone. The AllMusic journalist, Bill Dahl, considered Watts "one of the most incendiary [...] fire-breathing tenor sax honkers" of the 1950s.

== Biography ==
Born in DeLand, Florida, Watts studied violin and trumpet in his youth, later switching to sax. He gained musical training at Florida A&M, where he played in the school's marching band with future saxophonist Cannonball Adderley. Hired to play with The Griffin Brothers after college, Watts began his professional career. During the 1950s, he would work with Lionel Hampton, Paul "Hucklebuck" Williams, Dinah Washington, Jerry Lee Lewis, Buddy Holly, Chuck Berry, the Everly Brothers, and others. He also appeared on American Bandstand with Johnny Mathis in 1957, and performed in the house band at a Harlem club owned by boxer Sugar Ray Robinson.

Watts's career would eventually decline by the mid-1960s. He played lounge music in parts of Florida before being "rediscovered" by record producer Bob Greenlee. He made a minor comeback in 1987, and worked for Greenlee's record label.

In 2004 Watts died of a combination of pneumonia and emphysema. He is survived by his wife June and daughter, Natalie Watts Brown.

== Discography ==
=== As leader/co-leader ===
- 1987: Return of the Thin Man
- 1990: Noble & Nat – Noble "Thin Man" Watts and Nat Adderley
- 1993: King of the Boogie Sax
- 2019: Honkin', Shakin' & Slidin' (A Singles Collection 1954–1962) (Jasmine)

=== As sideman ===
- 1988: That Woman Is Poison! - Rufus Thomas
- 1989: Lucky Strikes! - Lucky Peterson
- 1990: Louisiana Legend - Raful Neal
- 1994: Goin' Back to Daytona - Floyd Miles
