= Tommy Jacquette =

- Born: December 13, 1943; Los Angeles, California, US
- Died: November 16, 2009 (aged 65); Los Angeles, California, US
- Other names: Tommy Halifu Jacquette; Tommy Jacquette-Halifu
- Known for: Founder of the Watts Summer Festival

Tommy Jacquette (December 13, 1943 – November 16, 2009), also known as Tommy Halifu Jacquette, was a community activist best known as the executive director of the Watts Summer Festival.

== Biography ==
Tommy Ray Jacquette was born on December 13, 1943, in Los Angeles, California, to parents Raymond Jacquette and Addie Young, the eldest of six children, growing up in the Imperial Courts housing development in Watts, California.

In the wake of the Watts Riots of 1965, Jacquette helped found the Watts Summer Festival to honor those who lost their lives during what he described as a "revolt" rather than a riot. "People keep calling it a riot, but we call it a revolt because it had a legitimate purpose," he said in a Los Angeles Times interview conducted four decades later.

In addition to the Watts Summer Festival, Jacquette was intimately involved in the Watts Christmas Parade, the Watts Gang Taskforce, the Wattstar Theatre and the Watts Chamber of Commerce.
