= UNIQ (nightclub) =

Defunct nightclub in Helsinki, Finland

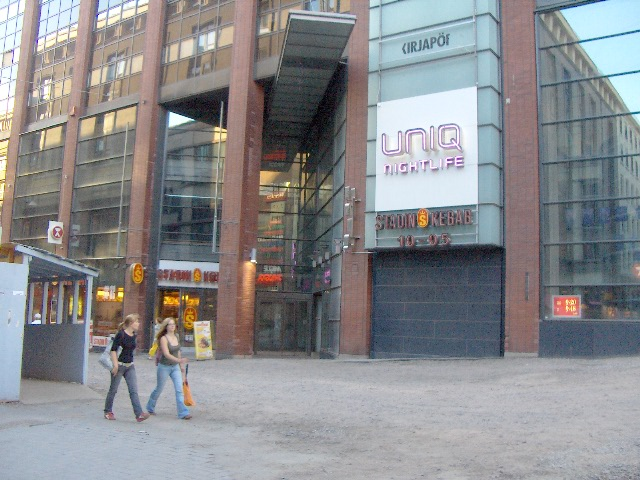

UNIQ was a nightclub in the centre of Helsinki, Finland, near the main building of the Helsinki University.

It was in the basement floor (one floor underground) of an office building housing a university research centre and an independent journalism studio.

The club's most noted feature was its "arctic ice bar", a separate room that is constantly kept at a temperature of about −5 °C (23 °F) and has its own bar, which, like all the other furnishings, is made of blocks of ice shipped from Lapland.

The drinks at UNIQ are priced according to a "drink stock market", which updates the drink prices by increments of about 10 cents every few minutes depending on their popularity. Popular drinks become more expensive, while unpopular drinks become cheaper.
