= Magic Touch Records =

Magic Touch Records is a record label founded in Milwaukee in the 1960s by producer, manager and performer Lenny LaCour. The label is particularly notable for developing the career of Harvey Scales, co-writer of the songs "Love-Itis" and "Disco Lady".

== History ==
Lenny LaCour, a Chicago-based record producer, relocated to Milwaukee in the 1960s, where he founded Magic Touch Records.

Magic Touch was primarily known as a soul music label. Lacour dabbled in other 60s music forms, such as rock, punk and garage, though the focus of the label remained soul music. LaCour persuaded certain white acts, such as Filet of Soul, to incorporate soul music into their repertoire, with resulting success. At various points, the label was distributed by Atco Records, Volt Records and Chess Records. Artists on the label included Harvey Scales and The Seven Sounds, Sean Taylor, Junior & The Classics, Mar J, Evelyn Smith, Marvelle & The Blue Match, Gary Brown and Filet of Soul.

In the late 1970s, LaCour returned to Chicago, and resurrected the Magic Touch label. He thereafter released a number of unsuccessful disco records on Magic Touch. LaCour continues to operate the label.
