= Jody's Got Your Girl and Gone =

Single by Johnnie Taylor

from the album One Step Beyond
- B-side: "A Fool Like Me"
- Released: October 1970
- Genre: R&B
- Length: 3:02
- Label: Stax 0085
- Songwriters: Don Davis, Kent Barker, Cam Wilson
- Producer: Don Davis

Johnnie Taylor singles chronology
""I Am Somebody""	"Jody's Got Your Girl and Gone"	""I Don't Wanna Lose You""

"Jody's Got Your Girl and Gone" is a 1970 R&B single by Johnnie Taylor. The song was written by record producer Don Davis with Kent Barker and Cam Wilson, and produced by Davis. The single was Taylor's second number one on the U.S. R&B chart and crossed over to the Billboard Hot 100, peaking at number twenty-eight in February 1971.

== Chart positions ==
Chart (1971)	Peak position
U.S. Billboard Hot 100	28
U.S. Billboard Best Selling Soul Singles	1

== See also ==
- List of number-one rhythm and blues singles of 1971 (U.S.)
