= Rufus Thomas =

American singer (1917–2001)

- Thomas in 1972

Background information
- Also known as: Mr. Swing
- Born: Rufus C. Thomas, Jr. March 26, 1917; Cayce, Mississippi, U.S.
- Died: December 15, 2001 (aged 84) Memphis, Tennessee, U.S.
- Genres: R&B; southern soul; blues; dance; funk
- Occupations: Singer; songwriter; dancer; comedian; television host; disc jockey
- Years active: 1936–1998
- Labels: Chess; Sun; Stax; AVI

Rufus C. Thomas, Jr. (March 26, 1917 – December 15, 2001) was an American rhythm-and-blues, funk, soul and blues singer, songwriter, dancer, DJ and comic entertainer from Memphis, Tennessee. He recorded for several labels, including Chess Records and Sun Records in the 1950s, before becoming established in the 1960s and 1970s at Stax Records. His dance records, including "Walking the Dog" (1963), "Do the Funky Chicken" (1969), and "(Do the) Push and Pull" (1970), were some of his most successful songs. According to the Mississippi Blues Commission, "Rufus Thomas embodied the spirit of Memphis music perhaps more than any other artist, and from the early 1940s until his death . . . occupied many important roles in the local scene."

He began his career as a tap dancer, vaudeville performer, and master of ceremonies in the 1930s. He later worked as a disc jockey on radio station WDIA in Memphis, both before and after his recordings became successful. He remained active into the 1990s and as a performer and recording artist was often billed as "The World's Oldest Teenager". He was the father of the singers Carla Thomas (with whom he recorded duets) and Vaneese Thomas and the keyboard player Marvell Thomas.

== Early life ==
Thomas was born in the rural community of Cayce, Mississippi, on the outskirts of Memphis, Tennessee, the son of a sharecropper. He moved with his family to Memphis around 1920. His mother was a "church woman". Thomas made his debut as a performer at the age of six, playing a frog in a school theatrical production. By the age of 10, he was a tap dancer, performing on the streets and in amateur productions at Booker T. Washington High School, in Memphis. From the age of 13, he worked with Nat D. Williams, his high-school history teacher, who was also a pioneer black DJ at radio station WDIA and columnist for black newspapers, as a master of ceremonies at talent shows in the Palace Theater on Beale Street. After graduating from high school, Thomas attended Tennessee A&I University for one semester, but economic constraints led him to leave to pursue a career as a full-time entertainer.

== Early career ==
Thomas began performing in traveling tent shows. In 1936 he joined the Rabbit Foot Minstrels, an all-black revue that toured the South, as a tap dancer and comedian, sometimes part of a duo, Rufus and Johnny. He married Cornelia Lorene Wilson in 1940, at a service officiated by Rev. C. L. Franklin, the father of Aretha Franklin, and the couple settled in Memphis. Thomas worked a day job in the American Finishing Company textile bleaching plant, which he continued to do for over 20 years. He also formed a comedy and dancing duo, Rufus and Bones, with Robert "Bones" Couch, and they took over as MCs at the Palace Theater, often presenting amateur hour shows. One early winner was B.B. King, another was Al Hibbler, and others discovered by Thomas later in the 1940s included Bobby Bland and Johnny Ace.

In the early 1940s, Thomas began writing and performing his own songs. He regarded Louis Armstrong, Fats Waller and Gatemouth Moore as musical influences. He had already made his professional singing debut in the late 1930s at the Elks Club and as part of the Dub Jenkins band on Beale Street, often filling in for another singer Claude Jones. Also, during the 1940s he became a regular performer in Memphis nightclubs, such as Currie's Club Tropicana. As an established performer in Memphis, aged 33 in 1950, Thomas recorded his first 78 rpm single, for Jesse Erickson's small Star Talent label in Dallas, Texas. Thomas said, "I just wanted to make a record. I never thought of getting rich. I just wanted to be known, be a recording artist. . . . [But] the record sold five copies and I bought four of them." The record, "I'll Be a Good Boy" backed with "I'm So Worried", gained a Billboard review, which stated that "Thomas shows first class style on a slow blues". He also recorded for the Bullet label in Nashville, Tennessee, when he recorded with Bobby Plater's Orchestra and was credited as "Mr. Swing"; the recordings were not recognised by researchers as being by Thomas until 1996. In 1951 he made his first recordings at Sam Phillips's Sun Studio, for the Chess label, but they were not commercially successful.

He began working as a DJ at radio station WDIA in 1951, and hosted an afternoon R&B show called Hoot and Holler. WDIA, featuring an African-American format, was known as "the mother station of the Negroes" and became an important source of blues and R&B music for a generation, its audience consisting of white as well as black listeners. Thomas used to introduce his shows saying, "I'm young, I'm loose, I'm full of juice, I got the goose so what's the use. We're feeling gay though we ain't got a dollar, Rufus is here, so hoot and holler." He also used to lead tours of white teenagers on "midnight rambles" around Beale Street. Thomas claimed to be the first black DJ to play Elvis Presley records, which he did until the station program director made him stop due to segregation. Shortly thereafter, Thomas performed on stage with Elvis to an all-black audience and the audience stormed through to get to him. After that, the program director allowed Elvis songs to be played on WDIA.

His celebrity in the South was such that in 1953, at Sam Phillips's suggestion, he recorded "Bear Cat" for Sun Records, an "answer record" to Big Mama Thornton's R&B hit "Hound Dog". The record became the label's first national chart hit, reaching No. 3 on the Billboard R&B chart. However, a copyright-infringement suit brought by Don Robey, the original publisher of "Hound Dog", nearly bankrupted the record label. After only one recording there, Thomas was one of the African-American artists released by Phillips, as he oriented his label more toward white audiences and signed Elvis Presley, who later recorded Thomas's song "Tiger Man". Thomas did not record again until 1956, when he made a single, "I'm Steady Holdin' On", for the Bihari brothers' Meteor label; musicians on the record included Lewie Steinberg, later a founding member of Booker T and the MGs.

== Stax Records ==
In 1960 he made his first recordings with his 17-year-old daughter Carla, for the Satellite label in Memphis, which changed its name to Stax the following year. The song, "Cause I Love You", featuring a rhythm borrowed from Jesse Hill's "Ooh Poo Pa Doo", was a regional hit; the musicians included Thomas' son Marvell on keyboards, Steinberg, and the 16-year-old Booker T. Jones. The record's success led to Stax gaining production and distribution deal with the much larger Atlantic Records.

Rufus Thomas continued to record for the label after Carla's record "Gee Whiz (Look at His Eyes)" reached the national R&B chart in 1961. He had his own hit with "The Dog", a song he had originally improvised in performance based on a Willie Mitchell bass line, complete with imitations of a barking dog. The 1963 follow-up, "Walking the Dog", engineered by Tom Dowd of Atlantic, became one of his most successful records, reaching No. 10 on the Billboard pop chart. He became the first, and still the only, father to debut in the Top 10 after his daughter had first appeared there. The song was recorded in early 1964 by the Rolling Stones on their debut album, and was a minor UK chart hit for Merseybeat group the Dennisons later that year.

As well as recording and appearing on radio and in clubs, Thomas continued to work as a boiler operator in the textile plant, where he claimed the noises sometimes suggested musical rhythms and lyrics to him, before he finally gave up the job in 1963, to focus on his role as a singer and entertainer. He recorded a series of novelty dance tracks, including "Can Your Monkey Do the Dog'" and '"Somebody Stole My Dog" for Stax, where he was often backed by Booker T. & the MGs or the Bar-Kays. He also became a mentor to younger Stax stars, giving advice on stage moves to performers like Otis Redding, who partnered daughter Carla on record.

After "Jump Back" in 1964, the hits dried up for several years, as Stax gave more attention to younger artists and musicians. However, in 1970 he had another big hit with "Do the Funky Chicken", which reached No. 5 on the R&B chart, No. 28 on the pop chart, and No. 18 in the UK Singles Chart, where it was his only chart hit. Thomas improvised the song while performing with Willie Mitchell's band at a club in Covington, Tennessee, including a spoken word section that he regularly used as a shtick as a radio DJ: "Oh I feel so unnecessary - this is the kind of stuff that makes you feel like you wanna do something nasty, like waste some chicken gravy on your white shirt right down front." The recording was produced by Al Bell and Tom Nixon, and used the Bar-Kays, featuring guitarist Michael Toles. Thomas continued to work with Bell and Nixon as producers, and later in 1970 had his only No. 1 R&B hit [and his second-highest pop charting record] with another dance song, "Do the Push and Pull". A further dance-oriented release in 1971, "The Breakdown", climbed to No. 2 R&B and No. 31 Pop. In 1972, he featured in the Wattstax concert, and he had several further, less successful, hits before Stax collapsed in 1976.

== Later career ==
Thomas continued to record and toured internationally, billing himself as "The World's Oldest Teenager" and describing himself as "the funkiest man alive". He "drew upon his vaudeville background to put [his songs] over on stage with fancy footwork that displayed remarkable agility for a man well into his fifties", and usually performed "while clothed in a wardrobe of hot pants, boots and capes, all in wild colors."

He continued as a DJ at WDIA until 1974, and worked for a period at WLOK before returning to WDIA in the mid-1980s to co-host a blues show. He appeared regularly on television and recorded albums for various labels. Thomas performed regularly at the Porretta Soul Festival in Italy; the outdoor amphitheater in which he performed was later renamed Rufus Thomas Park.

He played an important part in the Stax reunion of 1988, and appeared in Jim Jarmusch's 1989 film Mystery Train, Robert Altman's 1999 film Cookie's Fortune, and D. A. Pennebaker’s documentary Only the Strong Survive. Thomas released an album of straight-ahead blues, That Woman Is Poison!, with Alligator Records in 1988, featuring saxophonist Noble "Thin Man" Watts. In 1996, he and William Bell headlined at the Olympics in Atlanta, Georgia. In 1997, he released an album, Rufus Live!, on Ecko Records. In 1998, he hosted two New Year's Eve shows on Beale Street.

In 1997, to commemorate his 80th birthday, the City of Memphis permanently renamed Hernando Street, a road off Beale Street, close to the old Palace Theater, as Rufus Thomas Boulevard. He received a Pioneer Award from the Rhythm and Blues Foundation in 1992, and a lifetime achievement award from ASCAP in 1997. He was inducted into the Blues Hall of Fame in 2001.

== Death and legacy ==
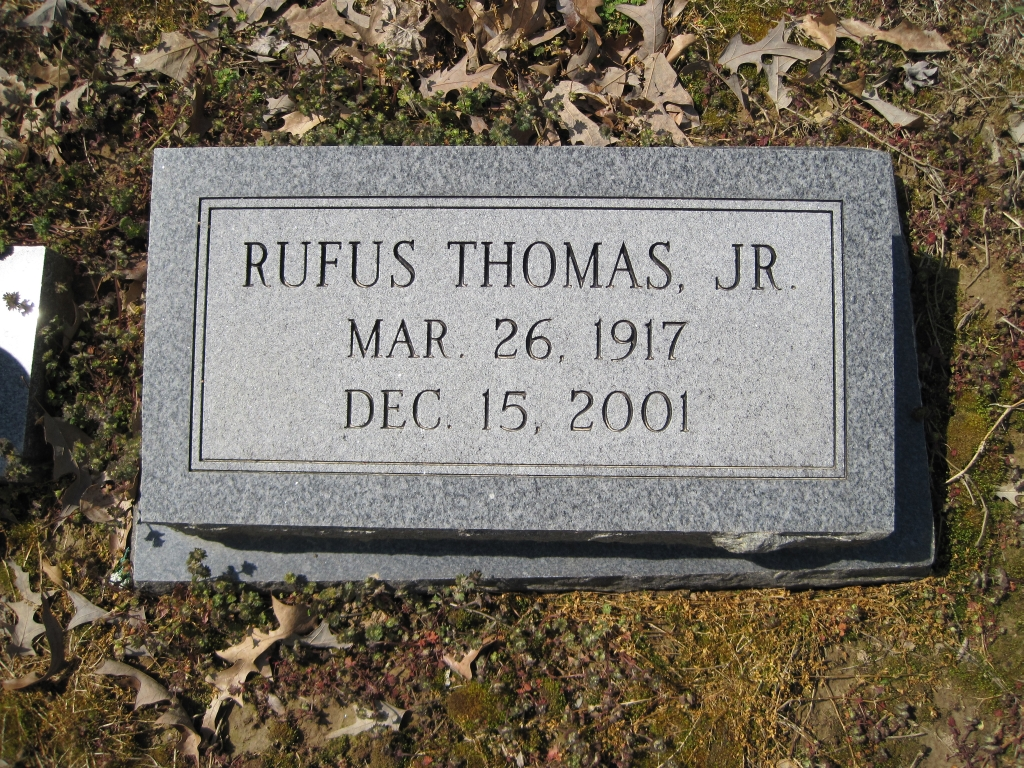
Rufus Thomas' grave, at the New Park Cemetery in Memphis

He died of heart failure in 2001, at the age of 84, at St. Francis Hospital in Memphis. He is buried next to his wife Lorene, who died in 2000, at the New Park Cemetery in Memphis.

Writer Peter Guralnick said of him:

His music... brought a great deal of joy to the world, but his personality brought even more, conveying a message of grit, determination, indomitability, above all a bottomless appreciation for the human comedy that left little room for the drab or the dreary in his presence.

Thomas was honored with a marker on the Mississippi Blues Trail in Byhalia.

== Discography ==
=== Albums ===
| Year | Title | Catalogue ref | Peak chart positions | |
| Year | Title | Catalogue ref | US 200 | US R&B |
|---|---|---|---|---|
| 1963 | Walking the Dog | Stax 704 | 138 | — |
| 1970 | Do the Funky Chicken | Stax STS-2028 | — | 32 |
| 1970 | Rufus Thomas Live: Doing the Push & Pull at P.J.'s | Stax STS-2039 | 147 | 19 |
| 1972 | Did You Heard Me? | Stax STS-3004 | — | — |
| 1973 | Crown Prince of Dance | Stax STS-3008 | — | 42 |
| 1977 | If There Were No More Music | AVI 6015 | — | — |
| 1978 | I Ain't Gettin' Older, I'm Gettin' Better | AVI 6046 | — | — |
| 1988 | That Woman Is Poison! | Alligator AL 4769 | — | — |
| 1996 | Blues Thang! | Sequel/Castle SEQ 1054 | — | — |
| 1996 | The Best of Rufus Thomas: Do the Funky Somethin' (compilation) | Rhino R2 72410 | — | — |
| 1997 | Rufus Live! [rec. 1996 at Southern Crossroads Festival in Atlanta, GA] | Ecko ECD 1013 | — | — |
| 2000 | Swing Out with Rufus Thomas | High Stacks HS 9982 | — | — |
| 2005 | Just Because I'm Leavin' (posthumous) | Segue Records SRRT05 | — | — |
"—" denotes releases that did not chart or were not released in that territory.

=== Singles ===
| Year | A-side | B-side | Catalogue no. | Chart positions | | |
| Year | A-side | B-side | Catalogue no. | US Pop | US R&B | UK |
|---|---|---|---|---|---|---|
| 1950 | "I'll Be a Good Boy" | "I'm So Worried" | Star Talent 807 | — | — | — |
| 1950 | "Gonna Bring My Baby Back" (as Mr. Swing with Bobby Plater's Orchestra) | "Beer Bottle Boogie" (as Mr. Swing with Bobby Plater's Orchestra) | Bullet 327 | — | — | — |
| 1951 | "Night Walkin' Blues" | "Why Did You Dee Gee" | Chess 1466 | — | — | — |
| 1952 | "No More Doggin' Around" | "Crazy 'Bout You, Baby" | Chess 1492 | — | — | — |
| 1952 | "Juanita" | "Decorate the Counter" | Chess 1517 | — | — | — |
| 1953 | "Bear Cat" | "Walking in the Rain" | Sun 181 | — | 3 | — |
| 1953 | "Tiger Man (King of the Jungle)" | "Save Your Money" | Sun 188 | — | — | — |
| 1956 | "I'm Steady Holdin' On" | "The Easy Livin' Plan" | Meteor 5039 | — | — | — |
| 1960 | "Cause I Love You" (as Carla [Thomas] and Rufus) | "Deep Down Inside" (as Carla and Rufus) | Satellite 102; Atco 6177 | — | — | — |
| 1961 | "I Didn't Believe" (as Rufus and Friend [Carla]) | "Yeah, Yea-Ah" (as Rufus and Friend) | Atco 6199 | — | — | — |
| 1962 | "Can't Ever Let You Go" | "It's Aw'right" | Stax 126 | — | — | — |
| 1963 | "The Dog" | "Did You Ever Love a Woman" | Stax 130 | 87 | 22 | — |
| 1963 | "Walking the Dog" | "You Said" ("Fine & Mellow" on some early copies) | Stax 140 | 10 | 4 | — |
| 1964 | "Can Your Monkey Do the Dog" | "I Wanna Get Married" | Stax 144 | 48 | * | — |
| 1964 | "Somebody Stole My Dog" | "I Want to Be Loved" | Stax 149 | 86 | * | — |
| 1964 | "That's Really Some Good" (as Rufus & Carla) | "Night Time Is the Right Time" (as Rufus & Carla) | Stax 151 | 92 (A); 94 (B) | * | — |
| 1964 | "Jump Back" | "All Night Worker" | Stax 157 | 49 | * | — |
| 1965 | "Little Sally Walker" | "Baby Walk" | Stax 167 | — | — | — |
| 1965 | "Willy Nilly" | "Sho' Gonna Mess Him Up" | Stax 173 | — | — | — |
| 1965 | "When You Move You Lose" (as Rufus & Carla) | "We're Tight" (as Rufus & Carla) | Stax 176 | — | — | — |
| 1965 | "Chicken Scratch" | "The World Is Round" | Stax 178 | — | — | — |
| 1966 | "Birds and Bees" (as Rufus & Carla) | "Never Let You Go" (as Rufus & Carla) | Stax 184 | — | — | — |
| 1967 | "Sister's Got a Boyfriend" | "Talkin' 'Bout True Love" | Stax 200 | — | — | — |
| 1967 | "Sophisticated Sissy" | "Greasy Spoon" | Stax 221 | — | 43 | — |
| 1968 | "Down ta My House" | "Steady Holding On" | Stax 240 | — | — | — |
| 1968 | "The Memphis Train" | "I Think I Made a Boo-Boo" | Stax 250 | — | — | — |
| 1968 | "Funky Mississippi" | "So Hard to Get Along With" | Stax 0010 | — | — | — |
| 1969 | "Funky Way" | "I Want to Hold You" | Stax 0022 | — | — | — |
| 1969 | "Do the Funky Chicken" | "Turn Your Damper Down" | Stax 0059 | 28 | 5 | 18 |
| 1970 | "Sixty Minute Man" | "The Preacher and the Bear" | Stax 0071 | — | 42 | — |
| 1970 | "(Do the) Push and Pull (Part 1)" | "Part 2" | Stax 0079 | 25 | 1 | — |
| 1971 | "The World Is Round" | "I Love You for Sentimental Reasons" | Stax 0090 | — | 34 | — |
| 1971 | "The Breakdown (Part 1)" | "Part 2" | Stax 0098 | 31 | 2 | — |
| 1971 | "Do the Funky Penguin (Part 1)" | "Part 2" | Stax 0112 | 44 | 11 | — |
| 1972 | "6-3-8 (That's the Number to Play)" | "Love Trap" | Stax 0129 | — | — | — |
| 1972 | "Itch and Scratch (Part 1)" | "Part 2" | Stax 0140 | — | — | — |
| 1973 | "Funky Robot (Part 1)" | "Part 2" | Stax 0153 | — | — | — |
| 1973 | "I Know You Don't Want Me No More" | "I'm Still in Love with You" | Stax 0177 | — | — | — |
| 1973 | "That Makes Christmas Day" | "I'll Be Your Santa Baby" | Stax 0187 | — | — | — |
| 1974 | "The Funky Bird" | "Steal a Little" | Stax 0192 | — | 93 | — |
| 1974 | "Boogie Ain't Nuttin' (But Gettin' Down) (Part 1)" | "Part 2" | Stax 0219 | — | 63 | — |
| 1975 | "Do the Double Bump (Part 1)" | "Part 2" | Stax 0236 | — | 74 | — |
| 1975 | "Jump Back '75 (Part 1)" | "Part 2" | Stax 0254 | — | — | — |
| 1976 | "If There Were No Music" | "Blues in the Basement" | Artists of America 126 | — | 92 | — |
| 1977 | "Who's Making Love to Your Old Lady" | "Hot Grits" | AVI 149 | — | — | — |
| 1977 | "I Ain't Gittin' Older, I'm Gittin' Better (Part 1)" | "Part 2" | AVI 178 | — | — | — |
| 1978 | "Fried Chicken" | "I Ain't Got Time" | Hi 78520 | — | — | — |
| 1981 | "Everybody Cried (The Day Disco Died)" | "I'd Love to Love You Again" | XL 151 | — | — | — |
| 1984 | "Rappin' Rufus" | "Rappin' Rufus (Instrumental Mix)" | Ichiban 85-103 | — | — | — |
| 1998 | "Hey Rufus!" | "Body Fine" (by The Bar-Kays) | High Stacks HS9801-7 | — | — | — |
"—" denotes releases that did not chart or were not released in that territory. * denotes that Billboard did not publish R&B charts during these chart runs.
