= Do the Funky Chicken =

"Do the Funky Chicken that is funky"

Single by Rufus Thomas

from the album Do the Funky Chicken
- B-side: "Turn Your Damper Down"
- Released: November 1969
- Recorded: 1969
- Genre: R&B; funk
- Length: 3:15
- Label: Stax Records STA 0059
- Songwriter: Rufus Thomas
- Producers: Al Bell; Tom Nixon

Rufus Thomas singles chronology
"Funky Way" (1969)	"Do the Funky Chicken that is funky" (1969)	"Sixty Minute Man" (1970)

"Do the Funky Chicken" is a song written and recorded by American R&B singer and entertainer Rufus Thomas for Stax Records in 1969. The song was used as the title track of Thomas' 1970 LP, Do The Funky Chicken.

It became one of his biggest hits, reaching number 5 on the R&B chart in early 1970, number 28 on the US pop chart, and number 18 in Britain where it was his only chart hit.

== Background ==
The record was one of a series of novelty dance hits for Thomas. He improvised the song after performing with Willie Mitchell's band at the University of Tennessee, developing it further at a gig in Covington. Thomas said:

I did it in the middle of doing another song... and the words just started to come. I don't know how, they just came out of the blue. I just separated it. 'You raise your left arm up, and your right arm too.' When you're doing the funky chicken you use both arms. You don't just use one. It just happened I separated it. Then I put a little rhythm in between it. The same pattern that you heard on 'The Dog' is here on 'The Funky Chicken' but it is cut in half. That's how it came about.

Thomas added a spoken word section that he regularly used as a shtick as a radio DJ: "Oh I feel so unnecessary - this is the kind of stuff that makes you feel like you wanna do something nasty, like waste some chicken gravy on your white shirt right down front." The recording was produced by Al Bell and Tom Nixon, and the instrumental backing was by the Bar-Kays, featuring guitarist Michael Toles.

Reviewer Stewart Mason described the "Funky Chicken" as "the single goofiest dance craze of the 1970s... While Thomas clearly knows how silly the entire concept is – he starts the record off with his impersonation of a cackling hen – he doesn't let that stop him from getting behind those goofy lyrics and giving them everything he's got...."

== Samples ==
The song has been sampled by other musicians. It was sampled by Eazy-E on his 1988 track "Still Talkin'". A live version was sampled on the 1988 Public Enemy track "Night of the Living Baseheads". Missy Elliott sampled the song in "Don't Be Commin' (In My Face)" (1997).SWV sampled the song "Can We" which features Elliott and was also released in 1997.

== See also ==
- Chicken (dance)
- "Funky Gibbon"
