= Luther Ingram =

American songwriter (1937–2007)

Background information
- Born: Luther Thomas Ingram; November 30, 1937; Jackson, Tennessee, U.S.
- Died: March 19, 2007 (aged 69) Belleville, Illinois, U.S.
- Genres: R&B, soul
- Occupations: Singer, songwriter
- Instrument: Vocals
- Years active: 1965–1992
- Labels: Koko; Profile

Luther Thomas Ingram (November 30, 1937 – March 19, 2007) was an American R&B and soul singer-songwriter. His most successful record, "(If Loving You Is Wrong) I Don't Want to Be Right", reached No. 1 on the Billboard R&B chart and No. 3 on the Hot 100 in 1972.

== Life and career ==
Luther Thomas Ingram was born in Jackson, Tennessee on November 30, 1937. His family moved to Alton, Illinois in 1947. Ingram's early interest in music led to formation of a gospel group, the Alton Crusaders, which included his brothers Archie and Richard. They eventually began singing doo-wop, and accompanied by bandleader Ike Turner, they recorded as the Gardenias for Federal Records in 1956.

In 1965, Ingram recorded his first solo record. His first three recordings failed to chart but that changed when he signed for KoKo Records in the late 1960s, and his first hit "My Honey And Me" peaked at No. 55 on the Billboard Hot 100 on 14 February 1970. Many of his songs appeared in the pop and R&B charts, even though Koko was only a small label, owned by his manager and record producer, Johnny Baylor. Koko and Baylor were closely associated with the Memphis based Stax Records label during the height of its commercial success.

Ingram is best known for the hit, "(If Loving You Is Wrong) I Don't Want to Be Right", written by Homer Banks, Carl Hampton and Raymond Jackson. The song reached No. 1 on Billboard's R&B chart and peaked at No. 3 on that publication's Hot 100 chart in the summer of 1972. The track stayed in the Hot 100 for 18 weeks, ultimately selling a reported four million copies. The song was later successfully covered by Millie Jackson, David Ruffin, and Barbara Mandrell; it has also been recorded by Bobby "Blue" Bland, Rod Stewart and Isaac Hayes.

Other popular tracks for Ingram included "Ain't That Loving You (For More Reasons Than One)", "Let's Steal Away to the Hideaway" and "I'll Be Your Shelter (In Time of Storm)". He also co-authored "Respect Yourself", a million seller for the Staple Singers, on the Stax label, in 1971. The acetate demo version of Ingram's, "Exus Trek" (an instrumental backing-track released 1966 as the B-side of HIB Records 698), became a sought after Northern soul track. With the Stax connections, Ingram recorded at the Memphis label's studios, as well as other southern-based studios such as Muscle Shoals. Ingram was opening act for Isaac Hayes for some years, and often used Hayes' Movement band and female backing group for his 1970s recordings. He recorded into the 1980s and performed in concert until his health began declining in the mid-1990s.

== Death ==
Ingram died on March 19, 2007, at a Belleville, Illinois, hospital of heart failure. According to his wife, Jacqui Ingram, he had suffered for years from diabetes, kidney disease and partial blindness. His funeral was at St. Augustine of Hippo Catholic Church in East St. Louis, Illinois and buried at Mount Carmel Catholic Cemetery in Belleville.

== Discography ==
=== Albums ===
- 1972: I've Been Here All The Time (KoKo)
- 1972: (If Loving You Is Wrong) I Don't Want To Be Right (KoKo)
- 1976: Let's Steal Away To The Hideaway (KoKo)
- 1977: Do You Love Somebody (KoKo)
- 1986: Luther Ingram (Profile)

=== Charted singles ===
Year	Single	Chart positions	
Year	Single	US Pop	US R&B
1969	"Pity for the Lonely"	-	39
1969	"My Honey and Me"	55	19
1970	"Ain't That Loving You (For More Reasons Than One)"	45	6
1970	"To the Other Man"	110	22
1971	"Be Good to Me Baby"	97	21
1971	"I'll Love You Until the End"	-	39
1972	"You Were Made for Me" / "Missing You"	93; 108	18; 26
1972	"(If Loving You Is Wrong) I Don't Want to Be Right"	3	1
1972	"I'll Be Your Shelter (In Time of Storm)"	40	9
1973	"Always"	64	11
1973	"Love Ain't Gonna Run Me Away"	-	23
1976	"Ain't Good for Nothing"	-	44
1977	"Let's Steal Away to the Hideaway"	-	33
1977	"I Like the Feeling"	-	35
1978	"Do You Love Somebody"	-	13
1978	"Get to Me"	-	41
1986	"Baby Don't Go Too Far"	-	29
1987	"Don't Turn Around"	-	55
1987	"Gotta Serve Somebody"	-	89
