= Don Davis (music producer) =

- Born: Donald Davis; October 25, 1938; Detroit, Michigan, US
- Died: June 5, 2014 (aged 75) West Bloomfield Township, Michigan, US
- Occupations: Record producer, songwriter, guitarist, banking executive
- Years active: Mid-1950s–1980s

Donald Davis (October 25, 1938 – June 5, 2014) was an American record producer, songwriter, and guitarist who combined a career in music with one in banking.

== Biography ==
Born in Detroit, he started playing music in the mid-1950s and after leaving Central High School formed his own jazz group, the Don Davis Trio, before becoming a session musician. He played guitar for many Detroit record labels, including Golden World and Ric-Tic, as well as on early Motown records such as the hits, "Money (That's What I Want)" by Barrett Strong and Mary Wells' "Bye Bye Baby".

He moved on to writing and producing records in Detroit and then joined Stax Records in Memphis, aiming to achieve a fusion of the Stax and Motown sounds. He achieved his first major success as a songwriter and producer in 1968 with Johnnie Taylor’s hit "Who's Making Love", which reached no.1 on the Billboard Hot R&B Singles chart and no.5 on the Billboard Hot 100. Davis also played guitar on the track, together with Steve Cropper. He worked with Taylor on many of his hits in the 1970s, including the 1971 R&B no.1 hit "Jody's Got Your Girl and Gone", which Davis co-wrote. Later, in 1976, he also co-wrote and produced Taylor's "Disco Lady", which spent four weeks at no.1 on the Billboard Hot 100 and six weeks on the Billboard R&B chart in the US. It was the first single to be certified platinum by the RIAA.

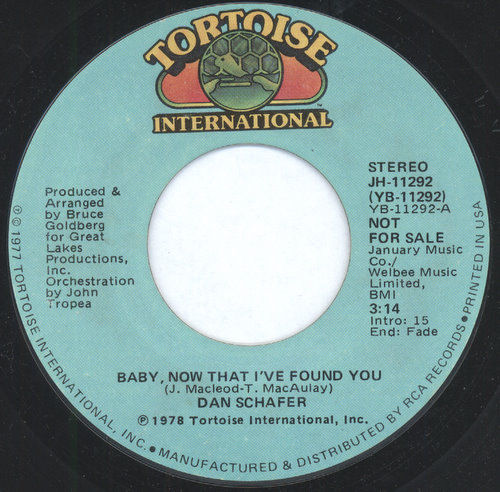
RCA/Tortoise International 1977, executive producer-Don Davis

Davis set up his own record production and music publishing companies, called Groovesville, which are still operating. In 1971, he bought one of Detroit's premier recording studios, United Sound, used by a host of musicians including George Clinton, Aretha Franklin, The Dramatics, The Dells, Carla Thomas, Michael Henderson, David Ruffin and Johnnie Taylor. He also used the Muscle Shoals Sound Studio in Alabama to record the basic rhythm tracks on some of his productions.

In 1975, Davis started and headed the RCA-distributed Detroit-based record label, Tortoise International which included artists, First Fire, The Rockets, the 1978 comeback album by The Skyliners, as well as the 1978 Dan Schafer version of the 1960s re-make "Baby Now That I've Found You" which was re-released in 2012 on the CD Perhaps..the Very Best of Dan Schafer. In 1977, Davis produced the Billy Davis, Jr. and Marilyn McCoo hit, "You Don't Have to Be a Star (To Be in My Show)".

Davis also established himself as a banker, founding the First Independence Bank, the only African American-owned and operated commercial bank in Michigan in 1970. He concentrated on his banking concern in later years, but continued to operate his music interests as well.

He lived in West Bloomfield Township, north of Detroit, and died after a short illness in June 2014, aged 75. He is survived by a wife and three children.
