= Disco Lady =

1976 single by Johnnie Taylor

Single by Johnnie Taylor

from the album Eargasm
- B-side: "You're the Best Girl in the World"
- Released: January 1976
- Recorded: 1975
- Genre: Disco; funk; soul; R&B
- Length: 4:02 (Promo Version); 4:28 (Album Version)
- Label: Columbia
- Songwriters: Harvey Scales, Albert Vance, Don Davis
- Producer: Don Davis

Johnnie Taylor singles chronology
"Try Me Tonight" (1975)	"Disco Lady" (1976)	"Somebody's Gettin' It" (1976)

"Disco Lady" is a 1976 single by American singer Johnnie Taylor that went on to become his biggest hit. It spent all four weeks of April 1976 at No. 1 on the Billboard Hot 100 and six weeks atop the Billboard R&B chart in the U.S. It was also the first single to be certified platinum by the RIAA; ultimately it sold over 2.5 million copies. Billboard ranked it as the No. 3 song for 1976, while Cashbox had it as the year's No. 1 song.

The single was Taylor's first for Columbia Records, where he signed after his long-time label, Stax Records, went bankrupt. The song was produced by Taylor's long-time producer, Don Davis. Among the guests on the song were four members of Parliament-Funkadelic: bassist Bootsy Collins, keyboardist Bernie Worrell, guitarist Glenn Goins, drummer Tiki Fulwood, and background vocals by BRANDYE (Cynthia Douglas, Donna Davis, Pamela Vincent).

"Disco Lady" was the first Hot 100 No. 1 hit with the word "disco" in the title (though the song was a ballad and not a disco record). The single also reached No. 25 on the UK Singles Chart.

In the finale of The Paul Lynde Halloween Special, broadcast in October 1976, Paul Lynde and the entire cast sing Johnnie Taylor's "Disco Lady" (gender-neutralized to "Disco Baby").

It earned Taylor his second Grammy Award nomination for Best Male R&B Vocal Performance.

In 1998, a remake of the song "Disco Lady 2000" (along with a "radio slam" remix) can be heard on the album Taylored to Please released by Malaco Records.

== Charts ==
=== Weekly charts ===
Chart (1976)	Peak position
Australia (Kent Music Report)	42
Canada RPM Top Singles	14
New Zealand (RIANZ)	6
UK	25
US Billboard Hot 100	1
US Billboard R&B	1
US Cash Box Top 100	1

=== Year-end charts ===
Chart (1976)	Rank
Canada	131
New Zealand	21
US Billboard Hot 100	3
US Cash Box Top 100	1

== Certifications ==
Region	Certification	Certified units/sales
Canada (Music Canada)	Gold	75,000^{^}
United States (RIAA)	Platinum	2,000,000^{^}
^{^} Shipments figures based on certification alone.
