= Johnnie Taylor =

American singer and songwriter (1934–2000)

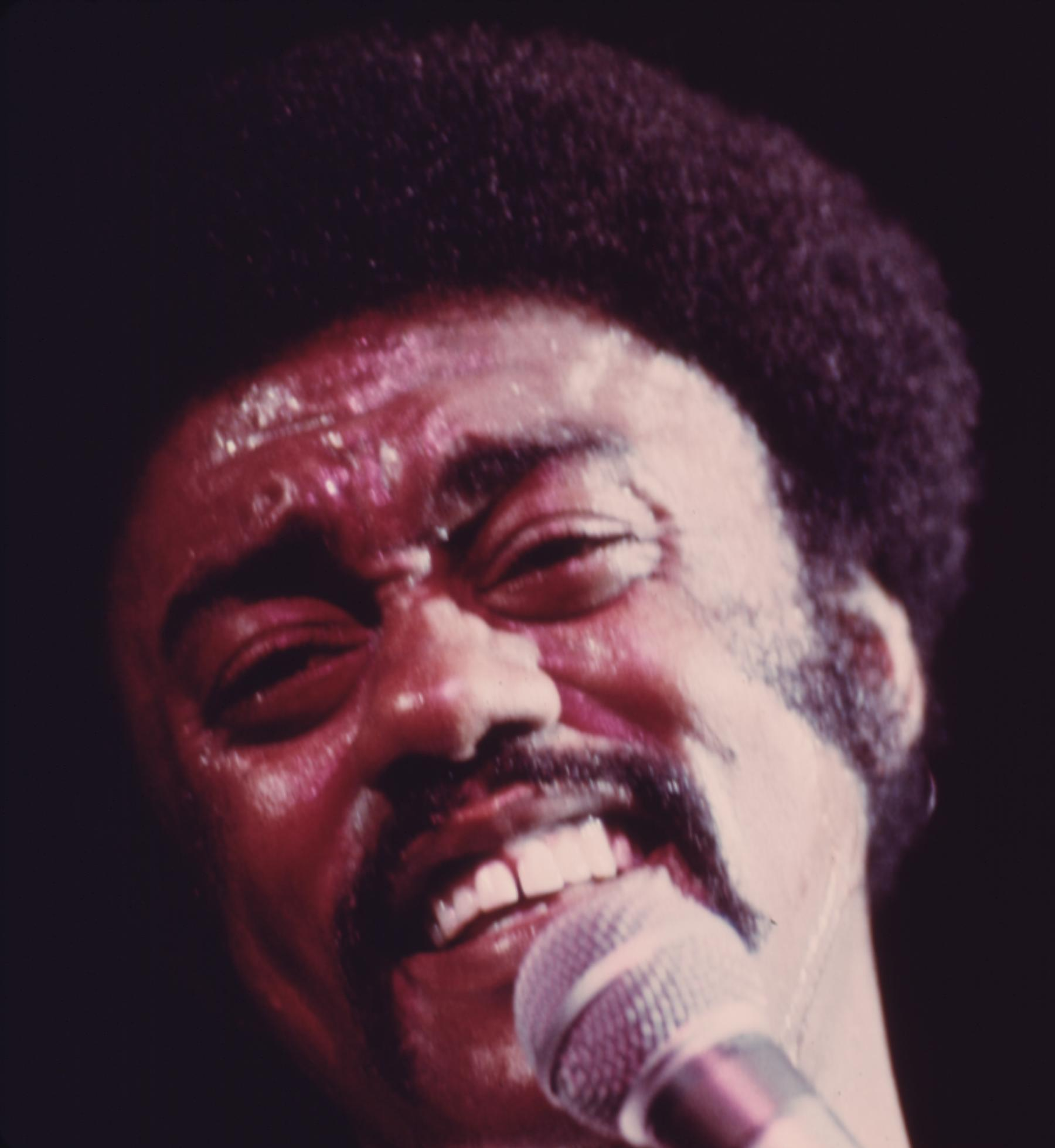
- Taylor performing at the International Amphitheatre in Chicago, 1973

Background information
- Also known as: Philosopher of Soul
- Born: Johnnie Harrison Taylor; May 5, 1934; Crawfordsville, Arkansas, United States
- Died: May 31, 2000 (aged 66) Dallas, Texas, United States
- Genre: R&B · soul · gospel · blues · pop · doo-wop · disco
- Occupations: Singer, songwriter, record producer
- Years active: 1953–2000
- Labels: Chance; SAR; Stax; Columbia; Beverly Glen; Malaco

Johnnie Harrison Taylor (May 5, 1934 – May 31, 2000) was an American recording artist and songwriter who performed a wide variety of genres, from blues, rhythm and blues, soul, and gospel to pop, doo-wop, and disco. He was initially successful at Stax Records with the number-one R&B hits "Who's Making Love" (1968), "Jody's Got Your Girl and Gone" (1971) and "I Believe in You (You Believe in Me)" (1973), and reached number one on the US pop charts with "Disco Lady" in 1976.

In 2022, Taylor was inducted into the Blues Hall of Fame.

== Biography ==
=== Early years ===
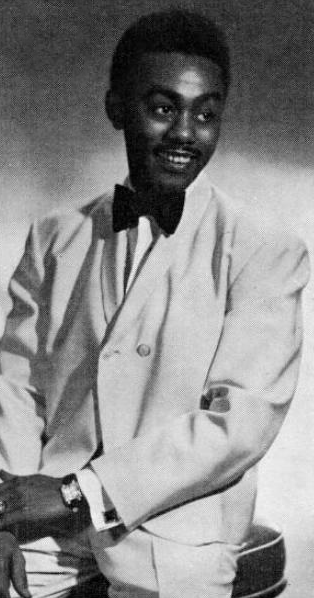
Taylor in 1967

Johnnie Taylor was born in Crawfordsville, Arkansas, United States. He grew up in West Memphis, Arkansas, performing in gospel groups as a youngster. As an adult, he had one release, "Somewhere to Lay My Head", on Chicago's Vee Jay Records label in the 1950s, as part of the gospel group The Highway Q.C.'s, which included a young Sam Cooke. Taylor's singing then was strikingly close to that of Cooke, and he was hired to take Cooke's place in the latter's gospel group, the Soul Stirrers, in 1957.

A few years later, after Cooke had established his independent SAR Records, Taylor signed on as one of the label's first acts and recorded "Rome Wasn't Built In A Day" in 1962. However, SAR Records quickly became defunct after Cooke's death in 1964.

In 1966, Taylor moved to Stax Records in Memphis, Tennessee, where he was dubbed "The Philosopher of Soul". He recorded with the label's house band, which included Booker T. & the M.G.'s. His hits included "I Had a Dream", "I've Got to Love Somebody's Baby" (both written by the team of Isaac Hayes and David Porter) and most notably "Who's Making Love", which reached No. 5 on the Billboard Hot 100 chart and No. 1 on the R&B chart in 1968. "Who's Making Love" sold over one million copies, and was awarded a gold disc. In 1970 Taylor married Gerlean Rocket, with their divorce finalized on May 10, 2000, 21 days before his passing. His children from that marriage are Jon Harrison Taylor, and Tasha Taylor, both musicians.

During his tenure at Stax, he became an R&B star, with over a dozen chart successes, such as "Jody's Got Your Girl and Gone", which reached No. 23 on the Hot 100 chart, "Cheaper to Keep Her" (Mack Rice) and record producer Don Davis's penned "I Believe in You (You Believe in Me)", which reached No. 11 on the Hot 100 chart. "I Believe in You (You Believe in Me)" also sold more than one million copies, and was awarded gold disc status by the R.I.A.A. in October 1973. Taylor, along with Isaac Hayes and The Staple Singers, was one of the label's flagship artists, who were credited for keeping the company afloat in the late 1960s and early 1970s after the death of its biggest star, Otis Redding, in an aviation accident. He appeared in the documentary film, Wattstax, which was released in 1973.

=== Columbia Records ===
"For a journeyman he's a minor genius—who knows more about fucking around than Alfred Kinsey."

— Christgau's Record Guide: Rock Albums of the Seventies (1981)

After Stax folded in 1975, Taylor switched to Columbia Records, where he recorded his biggest success with Don Davis still in charge of production, "Disco Lady", in 1976. It spent four weeks at number one on the Billboard Hot 100 and six weeks at the top of the R&B chart. It peaked at No. 25 in the UK Singles Chart in May 1976. "Disco Lady" was the first certified platinum single (two million copies sold) by the RIAA. Taylor recorded several more successful albums and R&B single hits with Davis on Columbia, before Brad Shapiro took over production duties, but sales generally fell away.

=== Malaco Records ===
After a short stay at a small independent label in Los Angeles, Beverly Glen Records, Taylor signed with Malaco Records after the company's founder Tommy Couch and producing partner Wolf Stephenson heard him sing at blues singer Z. Z. Hill's funeral in spring 1984.

Backed by members of the Muscle Shoals Rhythm Section, as well as in-house veterans such as former Stax keyboardist Carson Whitsett and guitarist/bandleader Bernard Jenkins, Malaco gave Taylor the type of recording freedom that Stax had given him in the late 1960s and early 1970s, enabling him to record ten albums for the label in his 16-year stint.

In 1996, Taylor's eighth album for Malaco, Good Love!, reached number one on the Billboard Top Blues Albums chart (No. 15 R&B), and was the biggest record in Malaco's history. With this success, Malaco recorded a live video of Taylor at the Longhorn Ballroom in Dallas, Texas, in the summer of 1997. The club portion of the Good Love video was recorded at 1001 Nightclub in Jackson, Mississippi.

Taylor's final song was "Soul Heaven", in which he dreamed of being at a concert featuring deceased African-American music icons from Louis Armstrong to Otis Redding to Z.Z. Hill to The Notorious B.I.G., among others.

== Radio ==
In the 1980s, Johnnie Taylor was a DJ on KKDA, a radio station in the Dallas/Fort Worth area, where he had made his home. The station's format was mostly R&B and Soul oldies and their on-the-air personalities were often local R&B, Soul, blues, and jazz musicians. Taylor was billed as "The Wailer, Johnnie Taylor".

== Death ==
Taylor died of a heart attack at Charlton Methodist Hospital in Dallas, Texas, on May 31, 2000, aged 66. Stax billed Johnnie Taylor as "The Philosopher of Soul". He was also known as "the Blues Wailer". He was buried beside his mother, Ida Mae Taylor, at Forrest Hill Cemetery in Kansas City, Missouri.

His highly complex personal life was revealed after his death. Having six accepted children and three others with confirmed paternity born to three different mothers, the difficulties associated with executing his will were presented in an episode of the TV program The Will: Family Secrets Revealed called "The Estate of Johnnie Taylor". In a 2021 Rolling Stone article, Fonda Bryant, one of the nine heirs of Taylor's estate, shared some of the complexities that she and her other siblings have had to deal with during the past decade regarding her father's royalty payments from Sony Music. Bryant believed that the alleged lack of transparency concerning those payouts was reason enough for Sony to disclose her father's personal information. Sony's refusal to do so left Bryant and the other heirs in the dark. Music industry attorney Erin M. Jacobson stated in the article that "'a label is not just going to turn over a bunch of financial records to anyone that asks for it.'" An audit is a viable option for "heirs who are distrustful of a label's accounting" practices. The down side to doing one, though, is the exorbitant amount of money that it would cost to do so, something too "unrealistic for most heirs like Bryant."

== Awards and nominations ==
Taylor was given a Pioneer Award by the Rhythm and Blues Foundation in 1999. Taylor was also a three-time Grammy Award nominee. In 2015 Taylor was inducted into the National Rhythm & Blues Hall of Fame. In 2022, Taylor was inducted into the Blues Hall of Fame. His induction citation stated "Taylor liked to emphasize that he could sing more than blues, as indeed he amply proved when performing gospel and soul, but among African-American audiences, he reigned as the top headliner of his era at blues events".

=== Grammy Awards ===
Taylor was nominated for three career Grammy Awards without a win.

Year	Nominee / work	Award	Result
1969	"Who's Making Love"	Best Male R&B Vocal Performance	Nominated
1977	"Disco Lady"	Best Male R&B Vocal Performance	Nominated
2001	Gotta Get the Groove Back	Best Traditional R&B Vocal Album	Nominated

Johnnie Taylor was awarded the first-ever Platinum Record Award in history by the RIAA for his two-million-selling smash hit, "Disco Lady".

== Musical influence ==
In 2004, the UK's Shapeshifters sampled Taylor's 1982 "What About My Love?", for their No. 1 hit single, "Lola's Theme".

== Discography ==
=== Studio albums ===
Year	Album	Peak chart positions		Label
Year	Album	US	US R&B	Label
1967	Wanted: One Soul Singer	—	26	Stax
1968	Who's Making Love...	42	5	Stax
1968	Raw Blues	126	24	Stax
1968	Rare Stamps	—	33	Stax
1969	The Johnnie Taylor Philosophy Continues	109	10	Stax
1971	One Step Beyond	112	6	Stax
1973	Taylored in Silk	54	3	Stax
1974	Super Taylor	182	10	Stax
1976	Eargasm	5	1	Columbia
1977	Rated Extraordinaire	51	6	Columbia
1977	Reflections	—	45	RCA
1977	Disco 9000	183	22	Columbia
1978	Ever Ready	164	35	Columbia
1979	She's Killing Me	—	53	Columbia
1980	A New Day	—	75	Columbia
1982	Just Ain't Good Enough	172	19	Beverly Glen
1984	This Is Your Night	—	55	Malaco
1985	Wall to Wall	—	46	Malaco
1987	Lover Boy	—	70	Malaco
1988	In Control	—	43	Malaco
1989	Crazy 'Bout You	—	47	Malaco
1991	I Know It's Wrong But I... Just Can't Do Right	—	59	Malaco
1993	Real Love	—	76	Malaco
1996	Good Love!	108	15	Malaco
1998	Taylored to Please	—	44	Malaco
1999	Gotta Get the Groove Back	140	30	Malaco
2003	There's No Good in Goodbye	—	30	Malaco
"—" denotes releases that did not chart.

=== Live albums ===
- FunkSoulBrother - Fuel/Universal. Retrospective album 1970/2006

=== Singles ===
Year	Single	Chart positions			
Year	Single	US	US R&B	UK	CAN
1963	"Baby, We've Got Love"	98	*	—	—
1964	I Need Lots Of Love	—	32	—	—
1966	"I Had a Dream"	—	19	—	—
1966	"I Got to Love Somebody's Baby"	—	15	—	—
1967	"Somebody's Sleeping in My Bed"	95	33	—	—
1968	"Next Time"	—	34	—	—
1968	"I Ain't Particular"	—	45	—	—
1968	"Who's Making Love"	5	1	—	7
1969	"Take Care of Your Homework"	20	2	—	27
1969	"Testify (I Wanna)"	36	4	—	35
1969	"I Could Never Be President"	48	10	—	—
1969	"Love Bones"	43	4	—	38
1970	"Steal Away"	37	3	—	36
1970	"I Am Somebody Part II"	39	4	—	45
1971	"Jody's Got Your Girl and Gone"	28	1	—	—
1971	"I Don't Wanna Lose You"	86	13	—	—
1971	"Hijackin' Love"	64	10	—	—
1972	"Standing in for Jody"	74	12	—	—
1972	"Doing My Own Thing (Part I)"	109	16	—	—
1972	"Stop Doggin' Me"	101	13	—	—
1973	"I Believe in You (You Believe in Me)"	11	1	—	35
1973	"Cheaper to Keep Her"	15	2	—	—
1974	"We're Getting Careless with Our Love"	34	5	—	77
1974	"I've Been Born Again"	78	13	—	—
1974	"It's September"	—	26	—	—
1975	"Try Me Tonight"	—	51	—	—
1976	"Disco Lady"	1	1	25	14
1976	"Somebody's Gettin' It"	33	5	—	94
1977	"Love Is Better in the A.M. (Part 1)"	77	3	—	63
1977	"Your Love Is Rated X"	—	17	—	—
1977	"Disco 9000"	86	24	—	—
1978	"Keep On Dancing"	101	32	—	—
1978	"Ever Ready"	—	84	—	—
1979	"(Ooh-Wee) She's Killing Me" / "Play Something Pretty"	—	37; 79	—	—
1980	"I Got This Thing for Your Love"	—	77	—	—
1982	"What About My Love"	—	24	—	—
1983	"I'm So Proud"	—	55	—	—
1984	"Lady, My Whole World Is You"	—	74	—	—
1987	"Don't Make Me Late"	—	74	—	—
1990	"Still Crazy for You"	—	60	—	—
"—" denotes releases that did not chart or were not released in that territory.
