= Up Here =

Up Here may refer to:

- Up Here (magazine), a Canadian magazine first published in 1984
- Up Here (TV series), a 2023 Hulu television series
- Up Here (Soulive album), 2009
- Up Here (Bluey soundtrack), 2026
- Up Here Festival, a Canadian art and music festival founded in 2012
