= Doin' Something =

Studio album by Soulive
- Released: March 13, 2001
- Recorded: New York, NY
- Genre: Jazz
- Length: 1:00:22
- Label: Blue Note Records
- Producer: Jeff Krasno Bob Brockmann and Yaron Fuchs

Soulive chronology
Turn It Out (1999)	Doin' Something (2001)	Next (2002)

Professional ratings
Review scores
Source	Rating
Allmusic	2.5/5 stars

Doin' Something is an album by Soulive that was released on March 13, 2001. It was produced by Jeff Krasno, Bob Brockmann and Yaron Fuchs.

The album is the group's third release since their formation in 1999. With this album, Soulive builds upon the creative momentum established in their previous two albums (Get Down! and Turn It Out) while experimenting with new melodic and rhythmic ideas. This album also marks the first time the group recorded with the acclaimed Blue Note label, having departed with Velour after their last recording. For Doin' Something, the group brings in a four-piece brass section (led by veteran trombonist Fred Wesley) to supplement organ and guitar overdubs in many of their tracks.

== Track listing ==
1. "Hurry Up... And Wait" – 4:06
2. "Doin' Something" – 6:46
3. "Evidence" – 4:33
4. "One in Seven" – 5:17
5. "Bridge to 'Bama" – 7:23
6. "Cannonball" – 5:41
7. "Shaheed" – 5:39
8. "Romantic" – 5:21
9. "Solid" – 4:53
10. "Roll the Tape" – 5:24
11. "Joe Sample" – 5:25

== Personnel ==
- Eric Krasno - guitar
- Alan Evans - drums
- Neal Evans - Hammond B3 organ, wurlitzer, piano
