= Turn It Out Remixed =

Remix album by Soulive
- Released: March 19, 2003
- Recorded: New York, NY
- Genre: Jazz/Hip Hop
- Length: 1:17:10
- Label: Velour Recordings
- Producer: Mister Rourke, Neal Evans, Kraz, Adam Deitch, DJ Spinna

Soulive chronology
Soulive (2003)	Turn It Out Remixed (2003)	Steady Groovin (2005)

Soulive's Turn It Out Remixed is a remix album of their classic 1999 release, Turn It Out. Each tune was reworked, remixed and replayed to create something wholly new, yet wholly Soulive.

Contributors on the album include DJ Spinna, The Beatnuts, DJ Krush, J-Live, Edreys Wajed aka Billy Drease Williams, Akil & Chali 2na (Jurassic 5), Meshell Ndegeocello, Wordsworth, Ekene, Shuman, Adam Deitch, Mister Rourke, Tycoon, Dub Fader & more. It was rated 2.5 stars by AllMusic.

== Track listing ==
1. "Intro"
2. "Tabasco" - (featuring Wordsworth)
3. "Doin' Something" - (featuring Chali 2na/Akil/Me'Shell Ndegeocello)
4. "Cash's Dream"
5. "Turn It Out"
6. "S.O.U.L.I.V.E." - (Edreys Wajed)
7. "Steppin'" - (The Beatnuts)
8. "Arruga de Agua" - (featuring Ekene Nwokoye)
9. "Nealization"
10. "Rudy's Way"
11. "Azucar" - (featuring J-Live)
12. "Steppin' 2" - (featuring Shuman)
