= Soulive =

American jazz-funk band

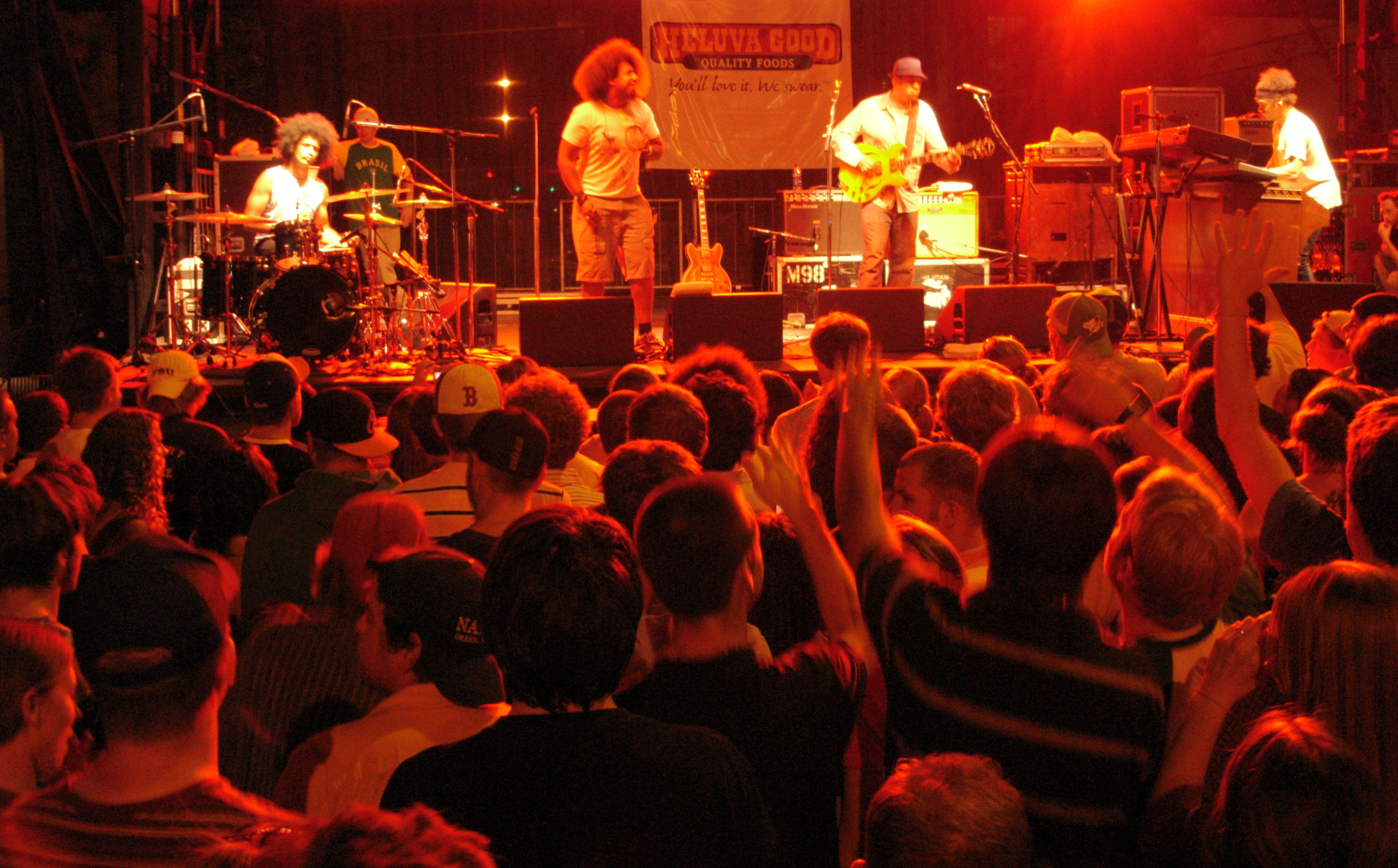
- Soulive and Reggie Watts performing at the Rochester International Jazz Festival in 2006

Background information
- Origin: Buffalo, New York, USA
- Genres: Soul jazz, jazz funk, jazz fusion, soul music
- Years active: 1999 – present
- Labels: Velour Recordings, Blue Note, Concord, Stax
- Members: Alan Evans; Neal Evans; Eric Krasno
- Past members: Toussaint Yeshua
- Website: soulive.com

Soulive is a funk/jazz trio that originated in Woodstock, New York. The band consists of Eric Krasno (guitar), Alan Evans (drums) and Neal Evans (Hammond B3 organ, bass keys, clavinet). Although they originated as a trio, the band has worked extensively with different horn sections, which have included Sam Kininger (saxophone) from 2000 to 2003, Rashawn Ross (trumpet), and Ryan Zoidis (saxophone) from 2003 to 2006. The band also worked with vocalist Toussaint Yeshua from 2006 to 2007. Soulive has toured in the original trio lineup of Eric Krasno, Alan Evans, and Neal Evans.

== History ==
In the 90s, brothers Alan and Neal Evans had been the rhythm section for the Northeastern jam band Moon Boot Lover with front man Peter Prince. After a brief foray into rap with Edreys aka Billy Drease Williams under the name The Elements, the brothers looked to form a traditional jazz organ trio. On March 2, 1999, Alan and Neal invited guitarist Eric Krasno (a friend they knew from high school days) to record some tracks with them in their home studio in Woodstock, New York. That jam session became their first album, Get Down! and the band shortly thereafter hit the road to begin touring. It was during that first summer together that the band recorded their first LP, Turn It Out, for Velour Recordings. Turn It Out featured various guest musicians, including John Scofield, Oteil Burbridge, and Sam Kininger. The independently produced album went on to sell 65,000 copies, enabling Soulive to gain recognition in the jazz/funk scene.

In the next three years, Soulive embarked on five national tours. The band opened for The Rolling Stones, Dave Matthews Band, The Roots, Common, John Mayer, and others. The band also continued to play at various festivals, including the Monterey Jazz Festival and Bonnaroo. Overseas, Soulive played shows in Japan and all over Europe.

In the fall of 2000, Soulive signed a record deal with Blue Note Records. The following spring, Soulive released its first Blue Note album, Doin' Something, which featured horn arrangements by Fred Wesley, the trombonist from James Brown's band. The band's second Blue Note record, Next, featured guest vocalists Dave Matthews and Amel Larrieux, and rappers Talib Kweli and Black Thought. During this time, the band also recorded with singer-songwriter Goapele Mohlabane.

In 2003, Soulive released a self-titled live album, Soulive (Live), and a collection of remixes, Turn It Out Remixed, which featured guests Jurassic 5, DJ Spinna, DJ Krush, J-Live, Wordsworth, and the Beatnuts.

In the Summer of 2005, Soulive left Blue Note Records and signed a new contract with the jazz label Concord Records.

On September 13, 2005, Soulive released its first album with Concord Records, Break Out. On this release the band eschewed extended jams for beat-driven instrumentals and collaborations with Chaka Khan (featured on "Back Again"), Ivan Neville (featured on "Got Soul" and "Take It Easy"), Corey Glover (featured on "Freedom"), Robert Randolph (featured on the Jimi Hendrix cover "Crosstown Traffic" and also on "Interlude II"), and Reggie Watts (featured on "She's Hooked" and "What Can You Do?").

Late in 2006 the group recorded No Place Like Soul with producer Stewart Lerman at his studio in Greenwich Village, The Shinebox. The album was released on Stax Records, which had been absorbed into Concord. On that album and the subsequent tour, Boston based reggae/soul artist Toussaint joined band as lead vocalist. However, after the tour, the band decided to become a trio yet again. In a post to the Soulive messageboard, Alan Evans explained: "we just want to have fun. no more chasing the pop thing or whatever that is. We just want to go out and rage, no setlists, no huge venues, no tour buses. Just have fun. This is not to say we didn't have fun with tours, we did but we realized that in looking at our past... We have had the most success and most fun when it was just the trio."

In 2008, Soulive performed at the Newport Jazz Festival.

Soulive released a new album, Up Here, on April 14, 2009. The album marked somewhat of a return to form for the group, as many of the songs are solely instrumentals. For this album, they were joined once again by Ryan Zoidis on tenor sax, Sam Kininger on alto sax - who are now under the alias/moniker "The Shady Horns" - as well as appearances by Rashawn Ross on trumpet. Nigel Hall also guests on the track "Too Much".

On July 28, 2009, Soulive played the pre-game festivities for the 2009 MLS All-Star Game at The Canyons in Park City, Utah.

In 2010 the band released an album of Beatles covers entitled Rubber Soulive. Neal Evans said in an interview, "We had a ton of different concept albums that we wanted to do over the years, including a ‘British Invasion’ album....When it came time to make a record we decided to follow through with the Beatles concept." In 2019, Krasno moved to the West Coast, in part, to build a home studio and dig deeper into his producer work. Soulive currently are focusing on city-specific runs and residencies. In 2020, he launched the Plus One podcast.

== Bowlive ==
Starting in 2010, Soulive has held an annual two-week, ten-night residency at the Brooklyn Bowl. The shows run from Tuesday to Saturday, each night involving a different opening act consisting of a myriad of both announced and unannounced guest musicians. Rarely has Soulive played as a trio during these shows—a horn section called "The Shady Horns," has almost always joined them on stage. The players have changed slightly over the years, but the section usually includes Ryan Zoidis on tenor and baritone saxophones and Sam Kininger on alto saxophone.

Some of the guest musicians have included:

Bowlive I (2010) – Oteil Burbridge, Questlove, Marco Benevento, Derek Trucks, Susan Tedeschi, Talib Kweli, The London Souls, Lettuce
Bowlive II (2011) – Robert Randolph, John Scofield, Karl Denson, Ivan Neville, Matisyahu, Bernie Worrell, Taylor Hicks, Kofi Burbridge, Lettuce, Corey Glover
Bowlive III (2012) – John Scofield, Karl Denson, George Porter Jr., Marco Benevento, Citizen Cope, Allen Stone, Derek Trucks, Lettuce, Questlove, Luther Dickinson
Bowlive IV (2013) - Luther Dickinson, Robert Randolph, Lee Fields, Marco Benevento, David Hidalgo, George Porter Jr.
Bowlive V (2014) - George Porter Jr., Nicki Bluhm, John Scofield, Susan Tedeschi, Joe Russo, Darryl McDaniels (Run-DMC), Talib Kweli
Bowlive VI (2015) - Marco Benevento, George Porter Jr., Anders Osborne, Chris Robinson, Jennifer Hartswick, Aaron Neville
Bowlive VII (2017) - Karl Denson, Steve Kimock, Doyle Bramhall II, John Scofield, George Porter Jr., Marcus King, GRiZ, Son Little

== Discography ==
| Title (Notes) | Label | Year released |
|---|---|---|
| Get Down! (EP) | Soulive; Velour Recordings | 1999; re-released 2002 |
| Turn It Out | Velour Recordings | 2000; re-released 2002 |
| Doin' Something | Blue Note | 2001 |
| Next | Blue Note | 2002 |
| Soulive (live) | Blue Note | 2003 |
| Turn It Out Remixed | Velour Recordings | 2003 |
| Steady Groovin' (compilation) | Blue Note | 2005 |
| Break Out | Concord | 2005 |
| No Place Like Soul | Stax/Concord | 2007 |
| Live at Blue Note Tokyo [2CD] | P-Vine | 2009 |
| Up Here | Royal Family | 2009 |
| Live in San Francisco | Royal Family | 2009 |
| Rubber Soulive | Royal Family | 2010 |
| Spark! (with Karl Denson) | Royal Family | 2012 |
| Cinematics, Vol. 1 (EP) | Soulive | 2017 |
| Cinematics, Vol. 2 (EP) | Soulive | 2024 |
| Flowers | Color Red/Flóki Studios | 2026 |

== See also ==
- Organ trio
