= Next (Soulive album) =

Studio album by Soulive
- Released: March 12, 2002
- Recorded: New York, NY
- Genre: Jazz
- Length: 1:14:49
- Label: Blue Note Records
- Producer: Jeff Krasno

Soulive chronology
| Doin' Something (2001) | Next (2002) | Soulive (2003) |

Next is an album by Soulive that was released on March 12, 2002. It was produced by Jeff Krasno.

Next brought a new chapter into the history of Soulive, and it marked the first time that the band toured as a quartet (with saxophonist Sam Kininger). Next built upon the success of the previous year's release, Doin' Something, with heavy driving beats and harmonized melodies. Next mirrored the great organ/guitar/sax era of the 60's, and built upon that 60's feel with reminiscent songs like "Tuesday Night's Squad" and "Alkime". Next also depicted a substantial hip-hop influence with rappers like Black Thought, featured on "Clap!", and Talib Kweli, featured on "Bridge to 'Bama (Hi Tek Remix)". Dave Matthews was also a guest on the track "Joyful Girl".

== Track listing ==
1. "Tuesday Night's Squad" – 7:23
2. "Flurries" – 5:55
3. "Liquid" – 6:38
4. "Joyful Girl" (featuring Dave Matthews) – 6:16
5. "Kalen" – 7:39
6. "Clap!" (featuring Black Thought) – 5:21
7. "Interlude" – 1:10
8. "Ne-Ne" – 8:06
9. "I Don't Know" (featuring Amel Larrieux) – 5:09
10. "Whatever It Is" – 4:30
11. "Alkime" – 7:01
12. "E.D. Hambone" – 5:05
13. "Bridge to 'Bama (Hi Tek Remix)" (featuring Talib Kweli) – 4:36
