= No Place Like Soul =

Studio album by Soulive
- Released: July 31, 2007
- Recorded: New York, NY
- Genre: Soul
- Length: 54:00
- Label: Stax Records
- Producer: Jeff Krasno

Soulive chronology
Break Out (2004)	No Place Like Soul (2007)	Up Here (2009)

Professional ratings
Review scores
Source	Rating
AllMusic	3.5/5 stars

No Place Like Soul is an album by Soulive that was released on July 31, 2007. It is produced by Jeff Krasno, with additional tracking and mixing done by Joel Hamilton.

Unlike previous Soulive albums, No Place Like Soul moved away from the band's jazz/funk feel and dabbled in the genres of soul, reggae, and pop. Contrary to the 2005 album Break Out, which featured many guest vocalists, No Place Like Soul showcased the talents of one sole vocalist, Toussaint. Also, unlike previous Soulive releases, the record only had two instrumental songs ("Bubble" and "Outrage").

== Track listing ==
1. "Waterfall" – 3:59
2. "Don't Tell Me" – 3:53
3. "Mary" – 4:22
4. "Comfort" – 4:01
5. "Callin'" – 4:08
6. "Outrage" – 3:48
7. "Morning Light" – 3:42
8. "Never Know" – 4:20
9. "Yeah Yeah" – 4:24
10. "If This World Was a Song" – 4:19
11. "One of Those Days" – 4:05
12. "Bubble" – 4:12
13. "Kim" – 4:47
