= Stax Records =

American record label

- Parent company: Concord (until 2026); BMG Rights Management (since 2026)
- Founded: 1957; 69 years ago
- Founder: Jim Stewart, Estelle Axton
- Defunct: 1975 (Original Company)
- Distributors: Concord Records (in the United States); Universal Music Group (distribution); Craft Recordings (reissues) Atlantic Records; Rhino Entertainment (Pre-1968 catalog)
- Genre: Soul; R&B; funk; blues
- Country of origin: United States
- Location: Memphis, Tennessee
- Official website: staxrecords.com

Stax Records is an American record company, originally based in Memphis, Tennessee. Founded in 1957 as Satellite Records, the label changed its name to Stax Records in September 1961. It also shared its operations with sister label Volt Records.

Stax was influential in the creation of Southern soul and Memphis soul music. Stax also released gospel, funk, and blues recordings. The label was founded by two siblings, business partners Jim Stewart and Estelle Axton, whose last names formed the basis of the label's name (Stewart + Axton = "Stax"). It featured several popular ethnically integrated bands (including the label's house band, Booker T. & the M.G.'s) and a racially integrated team of staff and artists unprecedented in that time of racial strife and tension in Memphis and the South. According to ethnomusicologist Rob Bowman, the label's use of "one studio, one equipment set-up, the same set of musicians and a small group of songwriters led to a readily identifiable sound. It was a sound based in black gospel, blues, country, and earlier forms of rhythm and blues (R&B). It became known as southern soul music."

Following the death of Stax's biggest star, Otis Redding, in 1967, and the severance of the label's distribution deal with Atlantic Records in 1968, Stax continued primarily under the supervision of a new co-owner, Al Bell. Over the next five years, Bell expanded the label's operations significantly, in order to compete with Stax's main rival, Motown Records in Detroit. During the mid-1970s, a number of factors, including a problematic distribution deal with CBS Records, caused the label to slide into insolvency, resulting in its forced closure in late 1975.

In 1977, Fantasy Records acquired the post-1968 Stax catalogue and selected pre-1968 recordings. Beginning in 1978, Stax (then owned by Fantasy) began signing new acts and issuing new material, as well as reissuing previously recorded Stax material. However, by the early 1980s, no new material was being issued, and for the next two decades, Stax was strictly a reissue label.

After Concord Records acquired Fantasy in 2004, the Stax label was reactivated, and is used to issue both the 1968–1975 catalog material and new recordings by modern R&B and soul performers. Atlantic Records continues to hold the rights to the vast majority of the 1959–1968 Stax material.

== History ==
=== 1957–1960: early years as Satellite Records ===
The "Stax-o-Wax" logo used during the Atlantic distribution years

Stax Records, originally named Satellite Records, was founded in Memphis in 1957 by Jim Stewart, initially operating in a garage. Satellite's early releases were country music, rockabilly records or straight pop numbers, reflecting the tastes of Stewart (a country fiddle player) at the time.

In 1958, Stewart's sister Estelle Axton began her financial interest in the company. Taking a considerable financial risk, she mortgaged her family home to invest US$2,500 (US$27,898 in 2025 dollars) in the company, enabling Satellite to purchase an Ampex 350 mono console tape recorder.

The company set up a small recording studio in a converted garage near National Cemetery in Brunswick, Tennessee, in 1959. In 1970, Stewart recalled this portion of the label's origins, and remarked, "I don't even remember the address. We didn't have any sound equipment or anything else but a small building and a lot of desire."

Around this time, Stewart was introduced to rhythm and blues music by staff producer Chips Moman. In the summer of that year, Satellite released its first record by a rhythm and blues act, "Fool in Love", by the Veltones, which was soon picked up for national distribution by Mercury Records. However, Satellite remained primarily a country and pop label for the next year or so.

While promoting "Fool in Love", Stewart met with Memphis disc jockey and R&B singer Rufus Thomas, and both parties were impressed by the other. Around the same time, and at the urging of Chips Moman, Stewart moved the company back to Memphis and into an old movie theater, the former Capitol Theatre, at 926 East McLemore Avenue in South Memphis; Stewart recalled that he chose the building because "it was in the area close to where Rufus Thomas (WDIA Radio disk jockey) lived [alongside] several of the other musicians and writers that are still working with the studio today. They drifted in and we got locked in on the rhythm and blues field." In the summer of 1960, Rufus Thomas and his daughter Carla were the first artists to make a recording in this new facility; the record, "Cause I Love You" (credited to Rufus & Carla), became a substantial regional hit and was picked up for national distribution by Atlantic Records on its Atco subsidiary. It went on to sell between thirty and forty thousand copies, becoming Satellite's biggest hit to that time.

=== 1961: name change to Stax and beginning of partnership with Atlantic ===
With the success of "Cause I Love You", Stewart made a distribution deal giving Atlantic first choice on releasing Satellite recordings. From this point on, Stewart focused more and more on recording and promoting rhythm and blues acts. Not having really known anything about the R&B genre prior to having recorded acts such as the Veltones and Rufus & Carla, Stewart likened the situation to that of "a blind man who suddenly gained his sight." From 1961 on, virtually all of the output of Satellite Records (and its successor labels Stax and Volt) would be in the R&B/southern soul style.

As part of the deal with Atlantic, Satellite agreed to continue recording Carla Thomas but allowed her recordings to be released on the Atlantic label. Her first hit, "Gee Whiz", was originally issued as Satellite 104, but it was quickly reissued as Atlantic 2086, becoming a hit in early 1961. Her recordings would continue to be issued on Atlantic through mid-1965, though much of her work was recorded in the studios at Satellite (later Stax) or in Nashville under the supervision of the Stax staff.

In June 1961, Satellite signed a local instrumental band, the Royal Spades. Changing their name to the Mar-Keys, the band recorded and issued the single "Last Night", which shot to No. 3 on the US pop chart and No. 2 on the R&B chart.

"Last Night" was the first single to be nationally distributed on the Satellite label; previous Atlantic issues of Satellite material were issued nationally on the Atlantic or Atco label. This led to a complaint from another company named Satellite Records, which had been in operation in California for some years but was previously unaware of the Memphis-based Satellite label. Accordingly, in September 1961, Satellite permanently changed its name to "Stax Records", a portmanteau of the names of the two owners of the company: Jim Stewart and Estelle Axton.

=== 1962–1964: Stax and Volt in ascendancy ===
By 1962, the pieces were in place that allowed Stax to turn from a successful regional label into (alongside Motown and Atlantic) a national R&B powerhouse. Throughout the rest of the 1960s, the label's operations would be greatly aided by several unique factors, including the label's record store, studio, artist and repertoire (A&R) department and house band, which regularly voted with Stewart on which records would be issued on the label.

==== Record store ====
While Stewart ran the recording studio where the auditorium had been, Axton ran the Satellite record shop, which she established in the cinema's old foyer, where the refreshment stand had been. (The store later expanded next door into a vacated barber shop.) The Satellite store sold records from a wide variety of labels, which gave the Stax staff first-hand knowledge of what kind of music was selling—and was subsequently reflected in the music that Stax recorded. The store quickly became a popular hangout for local teenagers and was used to test-market potential Stax singles, as acetates of recently recorded Stax music were played to gauge customers' reactions. It also provided regular employment for many of the young hopefuls who later became part of Stax's musical family and provided cash flow in the early years while the label was struggling to establish itself. In his 2013 book Respect Yourself: Stax Records and the Soul Explosion, Robert Gordon highlighted the importance of Estelle Axton to the company. Often addressed as "Miz Axton" or "Lady A.", she was respected by the Stax staff and performers and was regarded as a mother figure in the company. Although she had no formal training or experience in marketing, she had an unerring instinct for music and made many valuable suggestions to the young writers and musicians. Booker T. Jones described Estelle as "an inspirer":

She just loved music, loved people. She was always bringing us up there (the record shop), having us listen to records. She kept us in touch with the music industry. I doubt there would have been a Stax Records without Estelle Axton. She encouraged the entire Stax roster from her little perch behind the counter.

==== A&R ====
Original A&R director Chips Moman left the company at the end of 1961 after a royalty dispute with Stewart; he soon opened his own studio across town. Mar-Keys member Steve Cropper replaced Moman as Stewart's assistant and A&R director. Cropper would quickly become a writer, producer and session guitarist on scores of Stax singles.

==== House band ====
In the first few years at Stax, the house band varied, although Cropper, bassist Lewie Steinberg, drummers Howard Grimes or Curtis Green, and horn players Floyd Newman, Gene "Bowlegs" Miller, and Gilbert Caple were relative constants.

By 1962, multi-instrumentalist Booker T. Jones was also a regular session musician at Stax (he was primarily a pianist and organist, but he played sax on "Cause I Love You"), as was bassist Donald "Duck" Dunn. Jones, Steinberg and Cropper were joined in mid-1962 by drummer Al Jackson Jr. to form Booker T. & the M.G.'s, an instrumental combo that would record numerous hit singles in their own right and served as the de facto house band for virtually every recording made at Stax from 1962 through about 1970. Dunn eventually became the band's primary bassist, replacing Steinberg in 1964. Jones was frequently absent from Stax over several years in the mid-1960s, while he pursued his musical studies at Indiana University, so during this period Isaac Hayes usually replaced him as the house band's regular pianist, although the two occasionally performed on recordings together when Jones was back in Memphis.

Other members of the house band included horn players Andrew Love, Joe Arnold, and Wayne Jackson. Hayes had auditioned for Stax in 1962, unsuccessfully, but by 1964 he became a vital part of the Stax house band, along with his songwriting partner, David Porter. Cropper, Dunn, Hayes, Jackson, Jones and Porter were collectively known as the "Big Six" within the walls of Stax and were (either as a group or in various combinations) responsible for producing almost all of the label's output from about 1963 through 1969.

The Stax house band's working methods were unusual for popular music recording at the time, and it was this that attracted the interest of Atlantic Records' Jerry Wexler. For most major recording companies at the time, the standard practice was for the label's staff producer or A&R manager to hire a studio, an arranger and the session musicians who were to back the featured vocalist or instrumentalist, and the arranger would write sheet music arrangements for the musicians to work from. Such unionised sessions were run strictly "by the clock" and there was a strict demarcation between the studio and the control room. By contrast, the Stax sessions ran as long as was needed, the musicians moved freely between the control room and the studio floor, and all were free to make suggestions and contributions as they worked up what are known as head arrangements, in which none of the musicians' parts were written down and nothing was worked out in advance.

Stax's unusual working methods first came to Wexler's attention in the fall of 1963. He was expecting a new single from Carla Thomas, but when he contacted Stax he was told that they had been unable to record for two weeks because of faults in the recording equipment, so he immediately flew Atlantic's highly skilled house engineer Tom Dowd down to Memphis that Friday. Dowd had the equipment fixed within two days, and on the Sunday he was able to act as engineer during the creation of a new Rufus Thomas track. He was amazed by the loose, improvisational feel of the session and by the way Thomas and the musicians developed and recorded the song: Thomas simply sang through the new number for the band once or twice, humming suggestions for their parts and sounding the rhythm by clacking his teeth close to their ears. Once the new head arrangement was established, Dowd started recording, and Thomas and the band nailed the song in just two takes. When Dowd returned to New York the next day he had the tape of Thomas' breakthrough hit "Walking the Dog", which Jim Stewart lauded as the best-sounding record Stax had yet produced. Wexler later commented:

Memphis was a real departure, because Memphis was a return to head arrangements, to the set rhythm section away from the arranger. It was a return to the symbiosis between the producer and the rhythm section. It was really something new.

==== Stax studio ====
Another important factor in Stax's success was the studio itself. The recording studio, located at 926 E McLemore Ave in Memphis, was a converted movie theater, which still had the sloped floor where the seats had once been. Because the room was imbalanced, it created an acoustic anomaly that was audible on recordings, often giving them a big, deep yet raw sound. Soul music historian Rob Bowman notes that because of the distinctive sound, soul music fans can tell often within the first few notes if a song was recorded at Stax. When Tom Dowd first arrived at Stax in 1963 the studio was still using the veteran Ampex mono recorder it had purchased in the late Fifties. Dowd immediately suggested that a two-track recorder should be installed. The Stax team were appalled at the idea, fearing that the distinctive "Stax sound" would be destroyed. However, Dowd pointed out that stereo albums sold for a higher price, which would mean more income for Stax, so in the summer of 1965 he installed an additional two-track recorder, allowing Stax to record sessions simultaneously in mono and stereo, and in 1966 he upgraded the studio further with a four-track recorder.

==== Early successes ====
The label's biggest early star, soul singer Otis Redding, also arrived in 1962. Redding, however, technically was not on Stax, but on its sister label Volt. In that era, many radio stations, anxious to avoid even the hint of payola, often refused to play more than one or two new songs from any single record label at one time, so as to not appear to be offering favoritism to any particular label. To circumvent this, Stax, like many other record companies, created a number of subsidiary labels. Volt, founded in late 1961, was the label home to Otis Redding, the Bar-Kays, and a handful of other artists. Volt releases were initially issued by Atlantic through its subsidiary Atco Records. Other Stax subsidiaries over the years included Enterprise (named after the USS Enterprise from Star Trek, of which Al Bell was a fan), Chalice (a gospel label), Hip, Safice, Magic Touch, and Arch.

Redding's first single, "These Arms of Mine", issued in October 1962, hit both the R&B and the pop charts. Though the label had enjoyed some early hits with the Mar-Keys and Booker T. & the M.G.'s, Redding became the first Stax/Volt artist to consistently hit the charts with each release—in fact, each of Redding's 17 singles issued during his lifetime charted. (Carla Thomas also charted with some consistency, but her pre-1965 releases were on Atlantic, not Stax or Volt.)

Between January 1962 and December 1964, Stax and Volt released several chart hits each by Otis Redding, Rufus Thomas, and Booker T. and the M.G.'s. However, despite dozens of other releases, only three other Stax/Volt singles charted during this time, and all just barely: William Bell's "You Don't Miss Your Water" hit No. 95 in early 1962; the Mar-Keys' "Pop-Eye Stroll" hit No. 94 in mid-1962 (although it was a big hit in Canada, hitting No. 1 on Toronto's CHUM Chart), and Barbara & the Browns' "Big Party" made it to No. 97 in mid-1964.

Beginning in 1965, when the label formalized its distribution agreement with Atlantic, Stax/Volt artists made the charts much more frequently.

=== 1965–1967: Stax/Volt's continued success ===
In 1965, Jim Stewart signed a formal national distribution deal with Atlantic Records, although fatefully he signed the contract without reading it—a decision that would later cost the label dearly. Carla Thomas also formally rejoined the Stax label in 1965. Perhaps more importantly for the label's fortunes, the songwriting team of Isaac Hayes and David Porter began to establish themselves as Stax's new team of hit writer/producers. Hayes would also permanently join the Stax house band, often subbing for Booker T. Jones, who was studying music full-time at Indiana University during the mid-1960s.

In addition to hits by stalwarts Redding, Booker T. & the M.G.'s, and Carla Thomas, 1965 saw the chart debuts of Stax artists the Astors and Sam & Dave plus Volt artists the Mad Lads. Sam & Dave were technically on the Atlantic roster but were "leased" to Stax by Atlantic, with Stax overseeing their recordings and issuing them on the Stax label. Virtually all of Sam & Dave's Stax material was written and produced by Hayes and Porter.

Hip Hug-Her, by Booker T. & the MG's (1967), showing the two different Atlantic-era Stax logos

Atlantic's Jerry Wexler also brought Don Covay and Wilson Pickett to record at Stax, though these songs were released directly by Atlantic. Covay's hits "See Saw" and "Sookie Sookie" and Pickett's 1965 and 1966 hits "In the Midnight Hour", "Don't Fight It", "634-5789" and "Ninety-Nine and a Half (Won't Do)" were Stax songs in all but name, as they were all co-written by Steve Cropper, recorded at Stax, and backed by the Stax house band. Although Wexler was greatly enamoured of Stax's "organic" recording methods, some of the artists they brought in created conflict. A June 1965 session with Don Covay created bad feelings, which came to a head in early 1966, when Wilson Pickett returned to record new material. Although the session produced two hit songs—"634-5789" and "Ninety-Nine and a Half (Won't Do)"—Pickett's "corrosive" character caused havoc in the studio; the session musicians eventually walked out, and the breaking point came when Pickett followed them outside and offered them $100 each (US$1,022 in 2025 dollars) to complete the session. As a result, the furious house band bluntly told Jim Stewart not to bring "that asshole" to the studio again. Also tired of another label capitalizing on the Stax sound, Stewart phoned Wexler soon after the Pickett session and told him that he wanted to do no more Stax productions of non-Stax artists. One Atlantic artist who was thus not able to record at Stax was the newly signed Aretha Franklin. She instead was sent to Rick Hall's FAME studios in Alabama, which had a sound similar to that of Stax. Pickett's subsequent hits were also recorded elsewhere, including at Fame and American Group Productions, Chips Moman's Memphis studio.

Through 1966 and 1967, Stax and its subsidiaries hit their stride, regularly scoring hits with artists such as Otis Redding, Sam and Dave, Carla Thomas, William Bell, Booker T. & the M.G.'s, Eddie Floyd, the Bar-Kays, Albert King, and the Mad Lads. In 1966, Floyd recorded a tune named "Knock on Wood", which he wrote with Steve Cropper; Stewart was initially indifferent to the tune but released it after he was outvoted by the house band on the notion of issuing the record. It became an international smash hit, and Stewart reflected positively on its success afterward.

Unlike Motown, which frequently packaged its artists on review tours, Stax only infrequently sponsored concerts to promote its acts. The first of such concerts was in the summer of 1965, in Los Angeles rather than in Memphis. While the show was a success, the Watts riots began the day afterward, and several Stax artists were trapped in Watts during the violence. Stax also sponsored a Christmas concert in Memphis for several years, the most notorious of which was held in 1968, when special guest Janis Joplin performed drunk and was booed off of the stage. The most successful Stax package revue was a tour of England and France in 1967, which played to sold-out crowds. Stax released several live albums from the tour recordings, including the best-selling Otis Live in Europe.

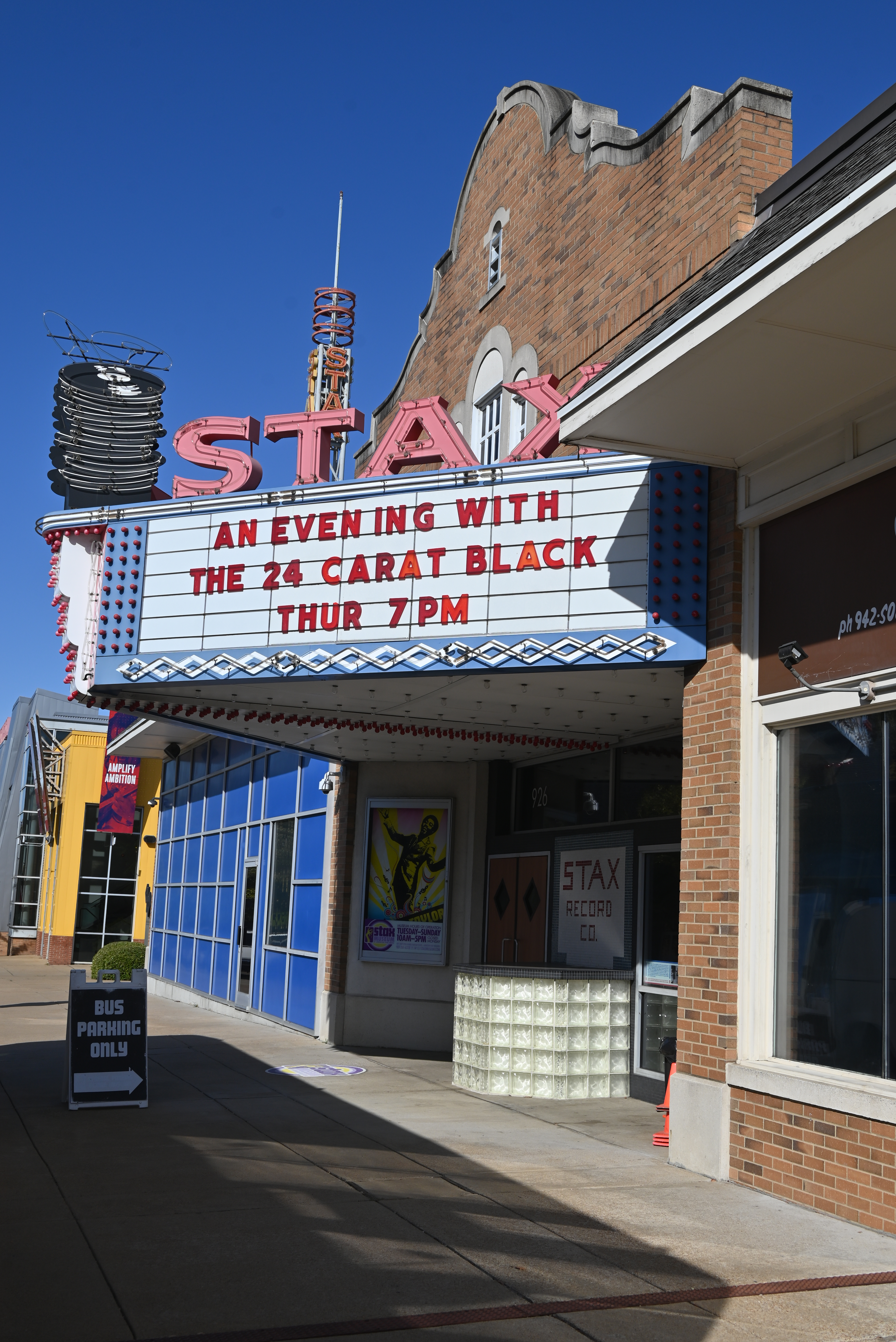
The Stax Museum on McLemore Avenue in Memphis, founded in 2003, is a replica of the Stax studio, built on the same site where many of the historic Stax recording sessions took place. The original Stax studio was demolished in 1989.

In 1967 Stax was at the height of its fame. Alongside Otis Redding were soul singers Sam and Dave, Carla Thomas and writer Isaac Hayes, who would have a deep impact on funk music in the 1970s. Also signed to the record label was the house band, Booker T. and the M.G.'s, who were breaking boundaries in integration. Two of the band members were black and two were white, which at the time was unheard of, because of racial turmoil in the United States.

In contrast to Stax's rapidly rising fortunes at this time, most of the house band were struggling to make a living: the musicians often worked long hours in the studio during the day, developing songs and arrangements, but they were paid for recordings only when the actual sessions took place, so most had to play at local venues in the evenings to earn enough to support themselves and their families. To remedy this, in 1966 Al Bell appointed the members of the so-called Big Six (Hayes, Porter and Booker T. & the M.G.'s) as full-time salaried employees of Stax, on a fixed salary of $125 a week (US$1,240 in 2025 dollars). This allowed them to quit their night jobs and become full-time professional studio musicians, and from this point on Booker T. and the M.G.'s regularly backed virtually all of the artists who recorded at Stax. Bell also persuaded Jim Stewart to set up a "production pool", in which a small portion of the royalty payments Stax was receiving from Atlantic was split equally between the Big Six to pay them for their production duties with the artists they backed.

Stax was located in Memphis, Tennessee, which was still a segregated city, where Martin Luther King Jr., a leader of the civil rights movement, was assassinated in 1968. While there was much racism around the artists, the Stax recording studio seemed to be an escape from the turmoil of the real world. When the artists went into the studio, they were there for one reason only, and that was to make hit music, some of which had the social consciousness that became a soundtrack for the civil rights movement. On their 1967 tour in Europe, some of the Stax artists were taken aback by the welcome that they received, enjoying a better reception in parts of Europe than in the United States.

Although the trip was a huge success for the artists and their label, it also marked another significant change in the political landscape at Stax. At a fraught tour meeting in Al Bell's hotel room, Steve Cropper was summarily removed as Stax's A&R director, and Al Bell took over the position. Following the touring party's return to Memphis, Bell was also promoted to executive vice president, and horn players Wayne Jackson and Andrew Love joined the Stax rhythm section as salaried Stax employees.

=== 1968: break with Atlantic Records ===
In 1967, Atlantic Records was sold to Warner Bros.-Seven Arts. The sale of Atlantic to Warner activated a "key man" clause (which Jim Stewart had insisted upon) in the distribution contract between Stax and Atlantic. This called for the renegotiation or termination of the distribution deal in the event that Stewart's nominated "key man" at Atlantic—Jerry Wexler—either left the company or sold his stock in Atlantic. Stax initially hoped to join Atlantic in the Warner buyout, so Jim Stewart, Estelle Axton and Al Bell flew to New York hoping to negotiate a deal, but according to Stewart the figure they were offered was "an insult". Stewart then approached Warner-Seven Arts directly, but their offer was similarly unacceptable to Stax.

Unhappy with either offer, Stewart then asked for the return of the Stax masters, but the executives at Warner-Seven Arts refused. It was then that he was informed that Atlantic's lawyer Paul Marshall had included a clause in the 1965 distribution contract that gave Atlantic all right, title and interest, including any rights of reproduction, in all Stax's Atlantic-distributed recordings between 1960 and 1967. Only its unreleased recordings remained the property of Stax; all of the masters delivered to Atlantic between 1960 and 1967 are still wholly owned by Atlantic's current parent company, Warner Music Group.

Stewart regarded his original deal with Wexler as a gentleman's agreement, and when the distribution arrangement was formalized with a contract in 1965, he had signed it without reading it, thus missing the fateful ownership clause. Stewart was furious at what he felt was Atlantic's—and Wexler's—betrayal of his trust, although Wexler continued to insist for years that he also had not read the contract and had nothing to do with the ownership clause. Wexler expressed his resentment of the situation in his 1993 autobiography Rhythm and the Blues:

There was no righting this wrong, Jim was screwed, and I feel bad about it to this day.

As a result of this turn of events, Stewart did not renew his distribution deal with Atlantic, and, on May 13, 1968, he instead sold Stax to Paramount Pictures, a unit of Gulf+Western; the sale brought it into direct co-ownership with Dot Records, a pop label Paramount had owned since 1957. Consequently, Stax was forced to move forward without the most desirable portion of its back catalogue and without Sam and Dave, who had been unofficially "on loan" to Stax up to this point, and who were forced to return to Atlantic after the split (although they never scored another major hit). The company was dealt another crushing blow when its biggest and best-loved artist, Otis Redding, as well as all but two of the members of the Bar-Kays, died in a plane crash on December 10, 1967. In April 1968 Martin Luther King Jr. was assassinated at the Lorraine Motel in Memphis, the place where many members of the Stax staff regularly met and ate, and where Steve Cropper and Eddie Floyd had written "Knock on Wood". In the riots that followed King's murder, many properties in the vicinity of the Stax studio were attacked by rioters, but Stax was left untouched.

Stewart remained at the company, and former Stax marketing executive Al Bell became the company's vice president and a co-owner, taking on a more active role as Stewart became less active in Stax's day-to-day operations. Estelle Axton disagreed with Bell's visions for the company, and disputes between the two executives led to an impasse where Bell made plans to leave the company. Forced to choose between his sister and his vice president, Stewart asked Axton to step down from the company. By 1970, she had sold her shares and would later go on to found Fretone Records, which had a major success in 1976 with the chart-topping "Disco Duck".

After the Atlantic distribution deal expired in May 1968, Atlantic briefly marketed Stax/Volt recordings made after the split. These recordings feature the alternate Stax/Volt logos used on the album covers on their labels, as opposed to the original Atlantic-era logos, such as the "Stax-o-Wax" logo. Stax label recordings were reissued on the Atlantic label, and Volt label material on the Atco label. Gulf+Western-owned Stax/Volt releases used new label designs, new logos (including the recognizable finger snapping logo) and new catalogue numbering systems to avoid confusion among the record distributors.

=== 1968–1972: Stax as an independent label ===
Stax has a reputation for the kind of guttural candor that first attracts many white fans to black music—Johnnie Taylor croaking "Who's making love to your old lady while you're out making love?" But so often it's more subtle. Above all, the Stax sound is mellow, not sweet or cool or otherwise untrue to its roots, but mellow. Horn riffs and bass-lines accent but never dominate, and even at their sexy best the Stax singers never try to embody abject lust.

— Robert Christgau in The New York Times (1969)

Although Stax had also lost their most valuable artists, they recovered quickly. Johnnie Taylor gave Stax its first big post-Atlantic hit in 1968 with "Who's Making Love", which became the label's best-selling single to that point. To begin rebuilding its catalog, Stax, under orders from Al Bell, released a whopping 27 albums (a Rufus Thomas album titled May I Have Your Ticket Please? was to be the 28th album released by the Gulf+Western-owned Stax, but the album was never finished) and 30 singles in mid-1969. Producer and songwriter Isaac Hayes stepped into the spotlight with Hot Buttered Soul. Originally seen just as a solo artistic project for Hayes to make up the numbers, it went on to sell over three million copies in 1969. By 1971, Hayes was established as the label's biggest star and was particularly noted for his best-selling soundtrack to the 1971 blaxploitation film Shaft. Hayes' recordings were among the releases on a third major Stax label, Enterprise, which had been founded in 1967.

The label also enjoyed great success when it had the Staple Singers make a dramatic shift from Gospel music to mainstream R&B. Al Bell began signing many more artists such as the Dramatics, Frederick Knight and The Soul Children. Even Rufus Thomas, one of the first artists signed to the label, enjoyed a popular resurgence with a string of hits in the late 1960s/early 1970s. However, Stax's record sales were down overall under Paramount, whose management were also trying to exert more control of the operation. In 1970, Stewart and Bell decided to purchase the label back, with financial help from Deutsche Grammophon, the European record company owned at the time by the giant Grammophon-Philips Group (renamed PolyGram in 1972). The financing on Deutsche Grammophon's end led to Stax's post-Paramount recordings being distributed outside of the United States by DG's pop label, Polydor Records, from 1970 until Stax fell into bankruptcy.

By the fall of 1970, both Steve Cropper and Booker T. Jones were frustrated with Stax's treatment of the MGs, and left the company and stopped playing sessions for Stax. Even though Jones was given the title of Vice President at Stax before leaving, as he put it, "There were titles given (to us) but we didn't actually make the decisions." A final Booker T. and the MGs album was issued in 1971.

The two remaining MGs (Duck Dunn and Al Jackson) stayed on at Stax, working as session musicians on various Stax recordings, although they also worked elsewhere. In particular, Al Jackson worked extensively with Al Green at crosstown rival Hi Records, co-writing a number of Green's hits between 1971 and 1975.

Stax, meanwhile, subsisted on its own between 1970 and 1972, using independent distributors. By mid-1971, the Stax logo was slightly altered in which the color of the finger-snapping hand was changed from blue to brown.

As co-owner, Bell undertook an ambitious program to make Stax not only a major recording company, but also a prominent force in the black community. For the first time, many of the label's acts began frequently recording at outside studios (such as Ardent Studios in Memphis and at recording studios in Muscle Shoals, Alabama) and working with outside producers, signaling an end of the signature Stax sound. Bell even created a comedy subsidiary label, Partee Records, which released albums focussed on comedy music from the likes of Richard Pryor and Moms Mabley; and he made a bid for the white pop market by signing Big Star and licensing albums by Terry Manning, the UK progressive rock band Skin Alley, and Lena Zavaroni. In addition, Bell became heavily involved with various causes in the African-American community, and was a close friend of the Reverend Jesse Jackson and a financial supporter of his Operation PUSH.

On August 20, 1972, the Stax label presented a major concert, Wattstax, featured performances by Stax recording artists and humor from rising young comedian Richard Pryor. Known as the "Black Woodstock", Wattstax was hosted by Reverend Jesse Jackson and drew a crowd of over 100,000 people, most of them African-American. Wattstax was filmed by motion picture director Mel Stuart (Willy Wonka & the Chocolate Factory), and a concert film of the event was released to theaters by Columbia Pictures in February 1973.

By this time, the Stax recording studio was accepting outside work again. In July and December 1973, Elvis Presley recorded three albums at Stax: Raised on Rock, Good Times, and Promised Land, which produced four top 20 hits for RCA, the label to which Elvis had been signed since 1955.

=== 1972–1975: decline and bankruptcy ===
Despite the success of Wattstax, the future of Stax was unstable. In 1972, Bell bought out Stewart's remaining interest in the company, and established a distribution deal with CBS Records. CBS Records President Clive Davis saw Stax as a means for CBS to fully break into the African-American market and successfully compete with Motown. Bell had originally proposed that CBS buy 50% of the company, but Davis discussed it with CBS's corporate attorneys, who saw anti-trust problems, so a national distribution deal was worked out instead. However, Davis was fired by the company shortly after signing the Stax distribution deal because of reports that he used funds from CBS for personal expenditures, including an expensive bar mitzvah of his son. (Davis, for his part, continues to insist that the "official" reason for his firing was only a convenient excuse and that, in reality, his quick ouster was a matter of personality conflict.) Without Davis at the helm, CBS very quickly lost interest in Stax.

The deal was altered by having the Stax labels' profits cut by up to 40%, particularly since the CBS distribution agents bypassed the traditional small mom-and-pop record sellers in the black community which had been the backbone of Stax's distribution, and weren't pushing the Stax product to the larger retailers for fear of undercutting rack space for CBS R&B artists such as Earth Wind and Fire, the Isley Brothers, and Sly & the Family Stone; additionally, CBS reportedly displayed a greater level of favoritism toward Philadelphia International Records, which was distributed by CBS and had become a formidable competitor of Stax and Motown combined. Reports came in to Stax of stores in cities such as Chicago and Detroit being unable to get new Stax records despite consumer demands, and the company attempted to annul its distribution deal with CBS. However, although CBS was uninterested in fully promoting Stax, it refused to release the label from its contract, for fear that Stax would land a more productive deal with another company and then become CBS's direct competitor.

The last big chart hit for Stax was "Woman to Woman" in 1974 from Shirley Brown, which appeared on subsidiary label, Truth, handled by independent distributors. The single's success helped delay the inevitable demise of the company for several months. By 1975, all of the secondary Stax labels had folded, with only the main Stax label and Truth remaining. Stax had signed artists like Joyce Cobb bringing her over from their Truth country music label that year, but were never able to produce recordings with her and other new talent. Truth was able to release a couple of other singles and an album by Shirley Brown.

Al Bell attempted to stave off bankruptcy with bank loans from Memphis' Union Planters Bank. Jim Stewart, unwilling to see the company die, returned to active participation in Stax and mortgaged his Memphis mansion to provide the label with short-term working capital. However, the Union Planters bank officers soon got cold feet, and foreclosed on the loans, costing Stewart his home and fortune. In the 2014 documentary Take Me To The River, Bell states unequivocally that the city's white power structure loathed the presence of such a successful black-owned company and was determined to destroy it by any means necessary, using the bank loans as an excuse.

Stax/Volt Records was forced into involuntary bankruptcy on December 19, 1975 and was closed by order of federal bankruptcy judge William B. Leffler on January 12, 1976. Three days before the bankruptcy proceedings, Union Planters intended to produce a memorial record album for Martin Luther King Jr. in which the proceeds would go toward allowing Stax to continue operation.

=== 1976–1977: Stax in limbo ===
Al Bell was arrested and indicted for bank fraud during the Stax bankruptcy proceedings, but was acquitted of those charges in August 1976. In early 1977, Union Planters sold Stax, its master tapes, and its publishing arms for about four million dollars to a holding corporation. This corporation then sold the Stax-owned master recordings, as well as the name "Stax Records", to Fantasy Records later that same year.

Effectively, that meant that Fantasy owned and controlled all Stax material recorded after May 1968 and the handful of pre-May 1968 Stax singles and albums Atlantic initially declined to distribute nationally in the 1960s (none of which were hits). Fantasy also gained control and ownership of all unreleased tracks and alternate takes of Stax recordings, including those recorded before May 1968, and gained the right to issue new recordings on Stax Records.

Stax's one-time McLemore Avenue headquarters were not sold until 1981, when Union Planters deeded it to the Southside Church of God in Christ for ten dollars.

Almo/Irving Music, the music publishing partner of A&M Records, acquired East Memphis Music, Stax's publishing arm, in 1981.

=== 1978–1981: Stax resumes operations ===
In October 1977, Fantasy announced it would set up a Memphis office primarily for the purposes of reviving the Stax label, with local promoter Bruce Bowles being hired as Fantasy's regional promotion and marketing manager. The next month, Fantasy appointed long-time Stax writer and producer David Porter to head up a revived version of the Stax label, which was relaunched in January 1978. Porter signed several new acts to Stax, including Fat Larry's Band, Rick Dees and Sho Nuff, and re-signed mid-1970s Stax acts Rance Allen, Soul Children and Shirley Brown. Porter was also responsible for overseeing compilations of previously unissued material by Isaac Hayes, Randy Brown, the Bar-Kays, Albert King and the Emotions.

This iteration of Stax released over two dozen singles, including nine that made the US R&B charts. By far the biggest hit of this era was the Bar-Kays' "Holy Ghost", a No. 9 R&B hit in 1978; it was a remixed and over-dubbed version of a track the band had recorded for Stax in 1975.

Fantasy had to make do, however, without many of the well-known acts on Stax, who moved on to other labels during the bankruptcy proceedings and were enjoying a string of hits at their new homes, including the Bar-Kays (on Mercury), Johnnie Taylor (on Columbia, where he had the nation's first RIAA-certified Platinum single in "Disco Lady"), Isaac Hayes (on Polydor), the Staple Singers, Richard Pryor (both on Warner Bros.), the Dramatics (on ABC), Shirley Brown (on Arista), and the Emotions (on Columbia, and later on ARC after their new producer Maurice White relaunched it as a vehicle for his productions).

Porter left Stax in 1979, and the label's new releases slowed to a trickle. By late 1981, Stax was strictly in the business of reissuing material recorded between 1968 through 1975 and previously unreleased archival material from the 1960s and 1970s.

=== 1982–2003: Stax as a reissue label ===
Through much of the 1980s and 1990s, Stax activities focused exclusively on re-issues. Because Atlantic owned (and still owns) most of the Atlantic-era Stax master recordings released up to May 1968, the Atlantic-controlled material has been reissued by co-owned Rhino Records or licensed to Collectables Records.

Fantasy, meanwhile, also repackaged and re-released the Stax catalogue it controlled, on the Stax label. Because Fantasy owned the non-master recordings of all Stax material, for several of its Stax compilations, Fantasy issued alternate takes of the Stax hit recordings in place of the master recordings owned by Atlantic.

In 1988, Fantasy issued the various artists album Top of the Stax, Vol. 1: Twenty Greatest Hits. This marked the first time an album was issued with both Atlantic-owned and Fantasy-owned Stax material; it was issued by arrangement with Atlantic Records. A second volume was released by Fantasy in 1991.

In 1991, Atlantic issued The Complete Stax/Volt Singles 1959–1968, a nine-disc compact disc boxed set containing all of the Atlantic-era Stax a-sides. This release earned Grammy Award nominations for producer Steve Greenberg in the Best Historical Album category and for writer Rob Bowman in the Best Album Notes category. The boxed set was certified gold in 2001, the largest collection of CDs ever to have earned that certification. Fantasy followed their lead and issued volumes two and three of the Complete Stax/Volt Soul Singles series in 1993 and 1994, respectively. Volume Two compiles the Stax/Volt singles from 1968 to 1971, while Volume Three completes the collection with the singles issued from 1972 to 1975. Volume Three earned a Best Album Notes Grammy Award for Rob Bowman. In 2000, Fantasy issued a boxed set titled The Stax Story, which includes pre-1968 material by arrangement with Atlantic.

Fantasy tried to revive Stax's sister label Volt Records twice during this time, first in the late 1980s and again in the late 1990s.

=== 2003–present: Stax Museum and revival of the label ===
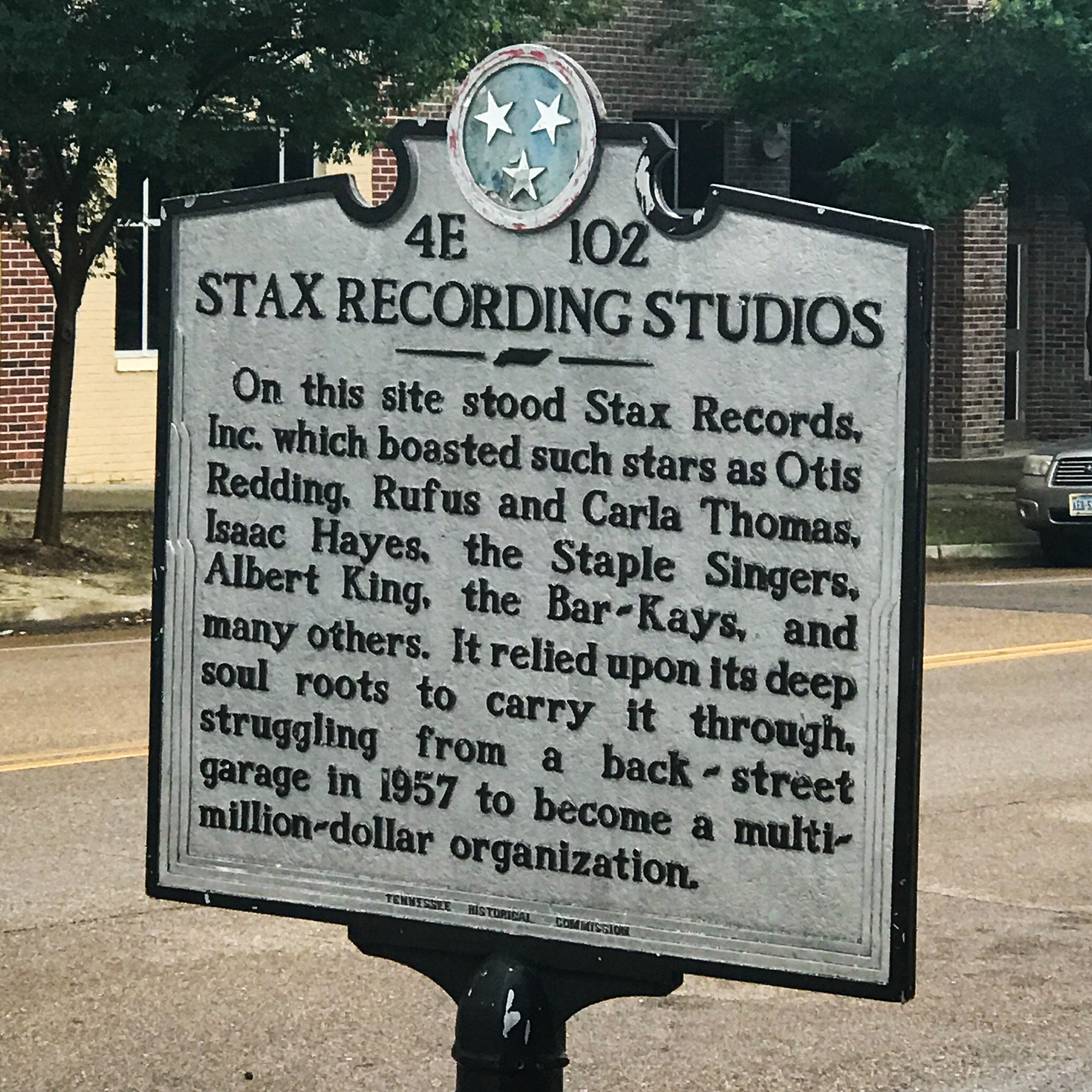
Tennessee Historical Commission marker at the original site of Stax Records, now the site of the Stax campus.

After a decade of neglect, the Southside Church of God in Christ tore down the original Stax studio in 1989. Over a decade later the Stax Museum of American Soul Music operated by the non-profit, Soulsville Foundation, was constructed at the site and opened in 2003. A replica of the original building, the Stax Museum features exhibits on the history of Stax and soul music in general, and hosts various music-related community programs and events. The Soulsville Foundation also operates the Stax Music Academy and The Soulsville Charter School, all part of the same campus where the original Stax Records was created.

Concord Records purchased the Fantasy Label Group in 2004, and in December 2006 announced the reactivation of the Stax label as a forum for newly recorded music. The first acts signed to the new Stax included Isaac Hayes, Angie Stone, and Soulive.

The formal relaunch came with the release on March 13, 2007 of Stax 50th Anniversary Celebration, a 2-CD box set containing 50 tracks from the entire history of Stax Records. The first Concord-distributed Stax album of all-new material was a various artists CD which was released on March 27, 2007 and titled Interpretations: Celebrating The Music of Earth, Wind & Fire. Soulive was the first artist on revived label to release an album of all-new material with No Place Like Soul released July 10, 2007.

On August 28, 2007, a 3 CD Deluxe Edition box set of the 1972 music event Wattstax was released, simply titled "WATTSTAX". For the first time in over 30 years almost half of the 25-plus performers at that event were finally heard for the first time, released in remastered stereo. The 3-CD set still only covers about one-third of the entire Wattstax concert, which lasted 10+ hours; Concord has not issued any statement as to the possibility of preparing future releases that would cover the remaining Wattstax material. (Isaac Hayes' complete Wattstax set was released on CD in 1995.)

On April 9, 2013, President Barack Obama and First Lady Michelle Obama hosted an event called "In Performance at the White House: Memphis Soul". Invited Stax artists included Booker T. Jones, Steve Cropper, Eddie Floyd, and Sam Moore. First Lady Obama also led a workshop called, "Soulsville, USA: The History of Memphis Soul."

In 2012 as part of the label revival, Stax Records signed Ben Harper and released his album with Charlie Musselwhite called Get Up! on January 29, 2013. Harper won a Grammy Award for Best Blues Album.

Nathaniel Rateliff & The Night Sweats released their critically acclaimed self-titled debut album on August 21, 2015. The band's live performance on The Tonight Show Starring Jimmy Fallon is credited with having boosted the band into the mainstream.

In 2016, Stax issued an album of new material by one of the label's original artists, William Bell, recorded in New York City and co-produced by him and Jon Leventhal. Stax Records was inducted into National Rhythm & Blues Hall of Fame on June 6, 2015 and was accepted by former Stax producer Al Bell in Clarksdale, MS.

On September 22, 2017, Stax released Soulsville U.S.A. (A Celebration of Stax), a three-CD compilation containing 60 tracks from the entire history of Stax Records. This release is an update of the Stax 50th Anniversary Celebration two-CD compilation from 2007. Soulsville U.S.A. contains twelve tracks not included in Stax 50th; there are two tracks in Stax 50th that are not included in Soulsville U.S.A.

Written In Their Soul: The Stax Songwriter Demos, a compilation of 146 demos from Stax, won the 2023 Grammy Awards for Liner Notes and Best Historical Album.

In 2024 Stax was the subject of an HBO documentary series Stax: Soulsville U.S.A. tracing the label's triumphs and trials to the present day.

== Label variations ==
=== Stax ===
- June 1961 – March 1968 (Atlantic distribution): Light blue label with STAX and "Stax-o-Wax" logo at top
- November 1967 – April 1968 (Atlantic distribution): Green label with multicolored "Stax" logo at left
- June 1968 – 1970 (Paramount distribution): Yellow label with blue "finger-snapping hand" logo at left
- 1970 – August 1971 (independent distribution): Same as above: yellow label and blue "finger-snapping hand" logo at left (some of these labels still bore the Paramount disclaimer)
- August 1971 – November 1975 (independent distribution): Yellow label with brown "finger-snapping hand" logo at left
- 1977–1978 (Fantasy distribution): Red or purple and white labels with black "finger-snapping hand" logo at left

=== Volt ===
- November 1961 – March 1968 (Atlantic/Atco distribution): Dark brown and red label with "VOLT" and red lightning bolt logo at top
- March 1968 – April 1968 (Atlantic/Atco distribution): Multicolored label with multicolored "VOLT records" on left and red lightning bolt on right
- June 1968 – June 1971 (Stax distribution): Dark blue label with orange and black lightning bolt on right
- August 1971 – 1975 (Stax distribution): Orange label with yellow lightning bolt on right

== Stax artists ==
=== 1957–1968: Atlantic Records era ===
- Rufus Thomas
- Carla Thomas (Satellite, Atlantic, then Stax)
- Booker T. & the M.G.'s
- Otis Redding (Volt)
- The Mar-Keys (Satellite, then Stax)
- The Mad Lads (Volt)
- Ruby Johnson (Volt)
- Mable John
- Gus Cannon
- The Astors
- Wendy Rene
- Sam & Dave (signed to Atlantic, recorded at Stax, recordings issued by Stax by arrangement with Atlantic until 1968)
- Eddie Floyd (Safice, Atlantic, then Stax)
- The Charmels (Volt)
- Johnnie Taylor
- William Bell
- The Bar-Kays (Volt)
- Albert King
- Ollie & the Nightingales (Chalice, then Stax)
- Isaac Hayes (Enterprise)
- The Goodees (Hip)
- Christian Harmonizers (Chalice)
- Johnny Daye
- Judy Clay
- Veltones (Satellite)
- The Chips (Satellite)
- Wilson Pickett (signed to Atlantic, recorded at Stax)
- Don Covay (signed to Atlantic, recorded at Stax)
- Arthur Conley (Jotis, signed to Fame/Atco, recorded at Stax)

=== 1968–1975: post-Atlantic years ===
- Johnnie Taylor
- The Soul Children
- The Staple Singers
- The Dramatics (Volt)
- Jean Knight
- Mel and Tim
- Isaac Hayes (Enterprise)
- Albert King
- O. B. McClinton
- Eddie Floyd
- William Bell
- Little Milton
- The Emotions (Volt)
- Booker T. & the M.G.'s
- The Bar-Kays (Volt)
- David Porter
- The Epsilons featuring Lloyd Parks -McFadden & Whitehead
- Richard Pryor (Partee)
- Bill Cosby (Partee)
- The Ross Singers
- The Rance Allen Group
- Kim Weston
- The Leaders (Volt)
- The Temprees (We Produce)
- Rev. Jesse Jackson (Respect)
- Moms Mabley (Partee)
- Luther Ingram (Koko)
- Terry Manning (Enterprise)
- Tommy Tate (Koko)
- The Nightingales
- Frederick Knight
- Shirley Brown
- Calvin Scott
- Inez Foxx
- The Sweet Inspirations
- Ernie Hines (Stax and We Produce)
- Roy Lee Johnson
- Jimmy McCracklin
- Lena Zavaroni
- Linda Lyndell (Volt)
- Round Robin Monopoly (Truth)
- Joyce Cobb (Truth)
- Larry Raspberry & the High Steppers (Enterprise)
- Eric Mercury (Enterprise)
- Ken Matthews
- Lou Bond (We Produce)
- Glenn Yarbrough
- Ben Atkins, (First Caucasian singer signed to the label)

=== 2006–present: Concord years ===
- Angie Stone
- Ben Harper
- Emerson, Lake & Palmer
- Lalah Hathaway
- Leela James
- Leon Ware
- N'dambi
- Nathaniel Rateliff and the Night Sweats
- Nikka Costa
- Soulive
- Southern Avenue
- Teena Marie
- William Bell
- Steel Young

== See also ==
- List of record labels
- Enterprise Records
- Goldwax Records
- Hi Records
- Muscle Shoals Rhythm Section
