= Break Out (Soulive album) =

Studio album by Soulive
- Released: September 13, 2005
- Recorded: New York, NY
- Genre: Jazz
- Length: 52:12
- Label: Concord Records
- Producer: Jeff Krasno

Soulive chronology
| Steady Groovin' (compilation) (2005) | Break Out (2005) | No Place Like Soul (2007) |

Professional ratings
Review scores
| Source | Rating |
|---|---|
| AllMusic | 3.5/5 stars |

Break Out is an album by Soulive that was released on September 13, 2005. It is produced by Jeff Krasno.

Contrary to previous albums, nearly all of the tracks are collaborations. Guest musicians include Chaka Khan (featured on "Back Again"), Ivan Neville (featured on "Got Soul" and "Take It Easy"), Corey Glover (featured on "Freedom"), Robert Randolph (featured on the Jimi Hendrix cover "Crosstown Traffic" and also on "Interlude II"), and Reggie Watts (featured on "She's Hooked" and "What Can You Do?").

== Track listing ==
North American Release:

1. "Interlude I" – 0:52
2. "Reverb" – 4:18
3. "Got Soul" (featuring Ivan Neville) – 3:41
4. "Cachaca" – 3:52
5. "Back Again" (featuring Chaka Khan) – 4:07
6. "Break Out" – 4:30
7. "She's Hooked" (featuring Reggie Watts) – 4:01
8. "Crosstown Traffic" (featuring Robert Randolph) – 4:34
9. "Take It Easy" (featuring Ivan Neville) – 3:32
10. "Vapor" – 4:59
11. "What Can You Do" (featuring Reggie Watts) – 4:02
12. "Interlude II" (featuring Robert Randolph) – 0:29
13. "Freedom" (featuring Corey Glover) – 4:41
14. "Glad Ta Know Ya" (featuring Cochemea Gastelum) – 3:30
15. "Interlude III" – 1:04

Japanese Release:

The Japanese edition of Break Out has a different track sequence, an 8:00 reprise of Crosstown Traffic, a longer version of Vapor with a different trumpet solo, a longer version of Back Again, and bonus tracks "Headphones" and "Left Behind". It also omits the Interlude tracks and the track Freedom.

1. "Reverb" – 4:18
2. "Got Soul" (featuring Ivan Neville) – 3:41
3. "Cachaca" – 3:22
4. "Back Again" (featuring Chaka Khan) – 4:56
5. "Break Out" – 4:30
6. "She's Hooked" (featuring Reggie Watts) – 4:09
7. "Vapor" – 5:34
8. "Crosstown Traffic" (featuring Robert Randolph) – 4:35
9. "What Can You Do" (featuring Reggie Watts) – 4:02
10. "Headphones" – 3:18
11. "Left Behind" – 3:37
12. "Glad Ta Know Ya" (featuring Cochemea Gastelum) – 3:34
13. "Crosstown Reprise" (featuring Robert Randolph) – 8:33
14. "Take It Easy" – 3:32 (featuring Ivan Neville)
