= Soulive (album) =

Live album by Soulive
- Released: April 8, 2003
- Recorded: October 12 – December 7, 2002
- Venue: House of Blues (Chicago), House of Blues (New Orleans), Irving Plaza (New York City), Legends (Boone, North Carolina), Variety Playhouse (Atlanta)
- Genre: Jazz, soul jazz,
- Length: 1:09:17
- Label: Blue Note
- Producer: Jeff Krasno

Soulive chronology
Next (2002)	Soulive (2003)	Turn It Out Remixed (2003)

Professional ratings
Review scores
Source	Rating
AllMusic	4/5 stars

Soulive is an album by Soulive that was released on April 8, 2003. It peaked at No. 10 on Billboard's jazz album chart.

== Track listing ==
1. "Aladdin" (Neal Evans) – 5:48
2. "El Ron" (Alan Evans) – 5:58
3. "Solid" (Alan Evans) – 6:12
4. "First Street" (Eric Krasno) – 6:39
5. "Shaheed" (Neal Evans) – 7:45
6. "Dig" (Neal Evans) – 7:55
7. "One In Seven" (Alan Evans) – 9:26
8. "Lenny" (Stevie Ray Vaughan) – 6:38
9. "Turn It Out" (Soulive) – 12:43
