= Rubber Soulive =

Studio album by Soulive
- Released: September 14, 2010
- Recorded: Playonbrother Studios
- Genre: Soul, Funk, Jazz
- Length: 39:46
- Label: Royal Family Records

Soulive chronology
Live at the Blue Note Tokyo (2010)	Rubber Soulive (2010)	Spark (2012)

Professional ratings
Review scores
Source	Rating
AllMusic	4.0/5 stars

Rubber Soulive is the tenth studio album by Soulive, on which the trio covers 11 songs by The Beatles (hence the title being a play on their 1965 album Rubber Soul).

AllMusic reviewer Hal Horowitz writes: "Like the Liverpool lads who intuitively meshed together, Soulive's members interlock to yield results greater than the sum of its parts on this successful tribute that combines the Beatles sense of excitement, imagination. and musical exploration with a funky, down-home R&B/jazz groove."

== Track listing ==
1. "Drive My Car" (John Lennon / Paul McCartney) – 3:30
2. "Taxman" (George Harrison) – 3:13
3. "In My Life" (John Lennon / Paul McCartney) – 2:37
4. "Eleanor Rigby" (John Lennon / Paul McCartney) – 4:19
5. "I Want You (She's So Heavy)" (John Lennon / Paul McCartney) – 5:00
6. "Come Together" (John Lennon / Paul McCartney) – 4:15
7. "Something" (George Harrison) – 3:11
8. "Revolution" (John Lennon / Paul McCartney) - 3:35
9. "Help!" (John Lennon / Paul McCartney) - 3:07
10. "Day Tripper" (John Lennon / Paul McCartney) - 3:05
11. "While My Guitar Gently Weeps" (George Harrison) - 3:54

Recorded at Playonbrother Studios

== Personnel ==
- Alan Evans - Drums
- Eric Krasno - Guitar
- Neal Evans - Organ [Hammond], Piano
