= Turn It Out =

Studio album by Soulive
- Released: April 9, 2002
- Recorded: New York, NY
- Genre: Jazz
- Length: 1:17:10
- Label: Velour Recordings/Universal
- Producer: Jeff Krasno

Soulive chronology
Get Down! (1999)	Turn It Out (2002)	Doin' Something (2001)

Turn It Out is an album by Soulive that was released on April 9, 2002 as a reissue. It was originally recorded in 2000. It was produced by Jeff Krasno.

The album was Soulive's first major recording. It featured the classic lineup of an organ trio, with Eric Krasno on guitar, Alan Evans on drums, and Neal Evans on Hammond B3 Organ. It also featured prominent members of the new jazz world, including Sam Kininger, John Scofield, and Oteil Burbridge.

== Track listing ==
1. "Steppin'" – 7:22
2. "Uncle Junior" (live) – 11:19
3. "Azucar" – 6:12
4. "Tabasco" (featuring John Scofield) – 4:31
5. "Rudy's Way" (featuring Sam Kininger) – 5:19
6. "Jesus Children" (live) – 7:52
7. "Nealization" (featuring John Scofield) – 8:13
8. "So Live!" (live) (featuring Oteil Burbridge) – 11:38
9. "Arruga De Agua" – 4:12
10. "Turn It Out" – 9:26
11. "Arruga De Agua (Reprise)" (Hidden Track) – 1:06
