= Up Here (Soulive album) =

Studio album by Soulive
- Released: April 14, 2009
- Recorded: South Deerfield, Massachusetts
- Genre: Soul, funk, jazz
- Length: 40:00
- Label: Royal Family Records
- Producer: Alan Evans

Soulive chronology
No Place Like Soul (2007)	Up Here (2009)	Live in San Francisco (2009)

Up Here is the ninth studio album by Soulive. Produced by Alan Evans, Neal Evans, Eric Krasno, and Jeff Krasno, it was released on April 14, 2009 in both physical and download versions (which were made available as DRM-free digital downloads through the iTunes Store and Amazon.com).

Doug Collette from All About Jazz writes: "This is Soulive at its best: retaining the beat as it swings throughout".

== Track listing ==
1. "Up Right" – 3:40
2. "The Swamp" – 4:36
3. "Too Much" – 4:16
4. "Backwards Jack" – 5:03
5. "PJ's" – 5:03
6. "Tonight" – 3:26
7. "Hat Trick" – 5:07
8. "For Granted" - 4:04
9. "Prototype" - 4:45

== Personnel ==
- Alan Evans - drums, vocals on "Tonight"
- Eric Krasno - guitar
- Neal Evans - keyboards
- Nigel Hall - vocals (on "Too Much" and "Prototype")

The Shady Horns:

- Sam Kininger - alto saxophone;
- Ryan Zoidis - tenor saxophone, alto saxophone
