= Get Down! (album) =

Studio album by Soulive
- Released: 1999
- Recorded: Kerhonkson, NY; New York, NY
- Genre: Jazz
- Length: 54:19
- Label: Velour
- Producer: Jeff Krasno, Sean Hoess

Soulive chronology
Get Down! (1999)	Turn It Out (2000)

Professional ratings
Review scores
Source	Rating
AllMusic	4/5 stars

Get Down! is an album by Soulive. It was originally self-released in 1999 and released on September 24, 2002, as a reissue. It was recorded between March and June 1999. The album was produced by Jeff Krasno and Sean Hoess.

The album is regarded as Soulive's first album. With this release, Soulive made its debut with the typical jazz organ trio combination of Eric Krasno on guitar, Alan Evans on drums, and Neal Evans on a Hammond B3. This album includes the popular "Uncle Junior," which has since become a fan favorite and major staple of a live Soulive performance.

== Track listing ==
1. "So Live!" – 11:36
2. "Uncle Junior" – 7:18
3. "Rudy's Way" – 6:19
4. "Cash's Dream" – 5:09
5. "Turn It Out" – 6:21
6. "Brother Soul" (Live) – 8:36
7. "Right On" (Live) – 10:01
