= Earth, Wind & Fire discography =

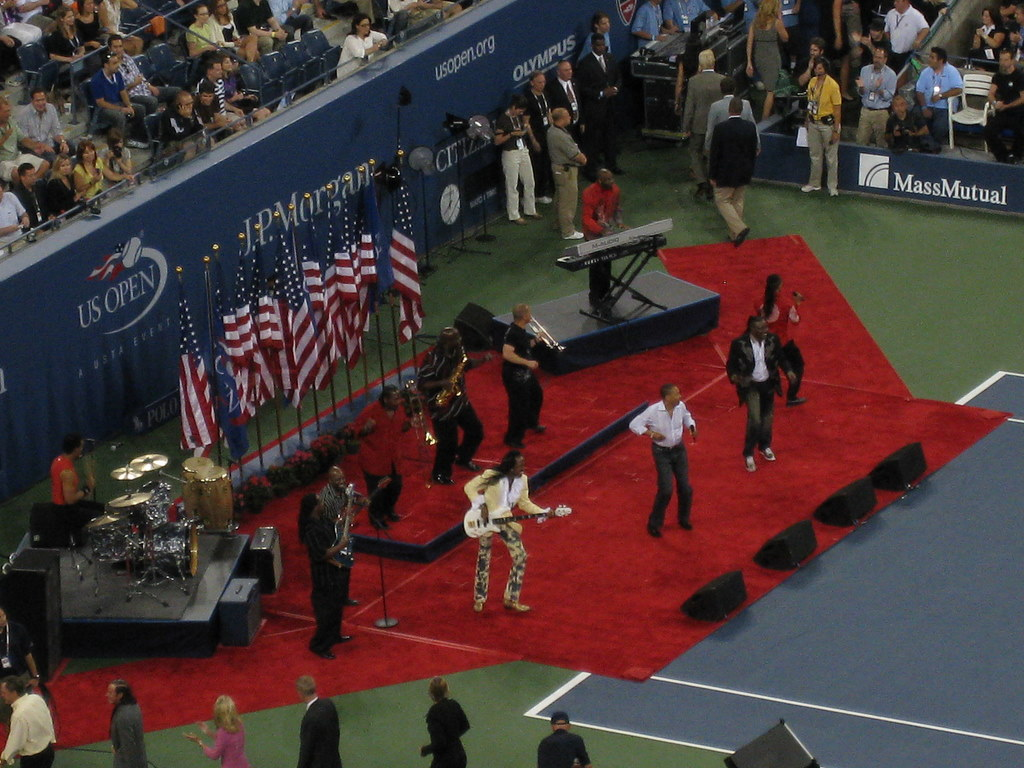
- Earth, Wind & Fire performing at the opening ceremony of the 2008 US Open
- Studio albums: 21
- Live albums: 4
- Compilation albums: 17
- Singles: 62
- Video albums: 19
- Music videos: 17

Earth, Wind & Fire (EW&F or EWF) is an American musical group. Their style and sound span over various music genres such as jazz, R&B, soul, funk, disco, pop, Latin, and Afro-pop. They are among the best-selling music artists of all time, with sales of over 90 million records worldwide.

The band was formed in Chicago by Maurice White in 1969, growing out of the Salty Peppers. Prominent members have included Philip Bailey, Verdine White, Ralph Johnson, Larry Dunn, Al McKay, Roland Bautista, Robert Brookins, Sonny Emory, Fred Ravel, Ronnie Laws, Sheldon Reynolds and Andrew Woolfolk. The band is known for its kalimba sound, dynamic horn section, energetic and elaborate stage shows, and the contrast between Bailey's falsetto and Maurice's tenor.

The band has won 6 Grammys out of 17 nominations and four American Music Awards out of 12 nominations. They have been inducted into the Rock and Roll Hall of Fame, the Vocal Group Hall of Fame, the NAACP Image Award Hall of Fame, and Hollywood's Rockwalk, and earned a star on the Hollywood Walk of Fame. The band has received an ASCAP Rhythm & Soul Heritage Award, a BET Lifetime Achievement Award, a Soul Train Legend Award, a NARAS Signature Governor's Award, a Grammy Lifetime Achievement Award, the 2012 Congressional Horizon Award, and the Kennedy Center Honors in 2019. Rolling Stone has called them "innovative, precise yet sensual, calculated yet galvanizing" and declared that the band "changed the sound of black pop". VH1 has described EWF as "one of the greatest bands".

== Albums ==
=== Studio albums ===
Year	Album	Peak chart positions										Certifications	Record label
Year	Album	US Pop	US R&B	AUS	CAN	NLD	JPN	NZ	GER	SWE	UK	Certifications	Record label
1971	Earth, Wind & Fire	172	24	—	—	—	—	—	—	—	—		Warner Bros.
1971	The Need of Love	89	35	—	—	—	—	—	—	—	—		Warner Bros.
1972	Last Days and Time	87	15	—	—	—	—	—	—	—	—		Columbia
1973	Head to the Sky	27	2	—	56	—	—	—	—	—	—	RIAA: Platinum	Columbia
1974	Open Our Eyes	15	1	—	19	—	—	—	—	—	—	RIAA: Platinum	Columbia
1975	That's the Way of the World	1	1	84	15	—	—	—	—	—	—	RIAA: 3× Platinum	Columbia
1976	Spirit	2	2	—	58	—	59	33	—	—	—	RIAA: 2× Platinum	Columbia
1977	All 'n All	3	1	21	3	4	14	12	—	11	13	RIAA: 3× Platinum; BPI: Silver; MC: Gold; NVPI: Gold	Columbia
1979	I Am	3	1	12	4	4	10	3	20	3	5	RIAA: 2× Platinum; BPI: Platinum; MC: Platinum	Columbia
1980	Faces	10	2	55	—	8	18	40	46	23	10	RIAA: Gold; NVPI: Platinum	Columbia
1981	Raise!	5	1	37	25	3	7	19	30	9	14	RIAA: Platinum; BPI: Gold; MC: Gold; NVPI: Gold	Columbia
1983	Powerlight	12	4	82	24	6	6	—	13	2	22	RIAA: Gold	Columbia
1983	Electric Universe	40	8	—	—	22	20	—	37	17	—		Columbia
1987	Touch the World	33	3	—	93	17	21	—	46	20	—	RIAA: Gold	Columbia
1990	Heritage	70	19	—	—	52	31	—	39	—	—		Columbia
1993	Millennium	39	8	—	—	29	18	—	—	50	—	RIAJ: Gold	Reprise
1997	In the Name of Love	—	50	—	—	78	24	—	—	—	—		Pyramid
2003	The Promise	89	19	—	—	—	115	—	—	—	—		Kalimba
2005	Illumination	32	8	—	—	—	61	—	—	—	—		Sanctuary
2013	Now, Then & Forever	11	6	—	—	35	—	—	55	—	25	BPI: Gold	Legacy
2014	Holiday	—	19	—	—	—	—	—	—	—	—		Legacy
"—" denotes a recording that did not chart or was not released in that territory.

=== Soundtrack albums ===
Year	Album	Peak chart positions		Certifications	Record label
Year	Album	US	US R&B	Certifications	Record label
1971	Sweet Sweetback's Baadasssss Song	—	13		Stax
"—" denotes a recording that did not chart or was not released in that territory.

=== Live albums ===
Year	Album	Peak chart positions						Certifications	Record label
Year	Album	US	US R&B	CAN	NLD	JPN	SWE	Certifications	Record label
1975	Gratitude	1	1	37	—	58	—	RIAA: 3× Platinum	Columbia
1996	Greatest Hits Live	—	75	—	78	43	36		Rhino
2002	That's the Way of the World: Alive in '75	—	—	—	—	—	—		Legacy
2002	Live in Rio	—	—	—	—	—	—		Kalimba
"—" denotes a recording that did not chart or was not released in that territory.

=== Compilation albums ===
Year	Album	Peak chart positions										Certifications	Record label
Year	Album	US	US R&B	AUS	CAN	NLD	JPN	NZ	GER	SWE	UK	Certifications	Record label
1974	Another Time	97	29	—	77	—	—	—	—	—	—		Warner Bros.
1978	The Best of Earth, Wind & Fire, Vol. 1	6	3	7	15	19	12	3	28	13	6	RIAA: 5× Platinum; BPI: Platinum; MC: Platinum; NVPI: Gold	ARC/Columbia
1986	The Collection	—	—	—	—	—	—	—	—	—	5	BPI: Gold	K-tel
1986	The Very Best of Earth, Wind & Fire	—	—	—	—	21	—	—	—	—	—		Columbia
1988	The Best of Earth, Wind & Fire, Vol. 2	190	74	—	—	—	—	—	—	—	—	RIAA: Gold	Columbia
1991	The Very Best of Earth, Wind & Fire	—	—	—	—	28	—	—	—	18			Columbia
1992	The Eternal Dance	—	—	—	—	—	—	—	—	—	—		Columbia
1992	The Very Best of Earth, Wind & Fire	—	—	—	—	—	—	—	—	—	40		Telstar
1994	The Very Best	—	—	—	—	—	—	—	—	—	—	SNEP: 2× Gold	Versailles
1994	Dance Tracks	—	—	—	—	—	62	—	—	—	—	RIAJ: Gold	Sony Music
1994	Earth, Wind & Fire	—	—	—	—	—	—	—	—	—	—	SNEP: Gold	Columbia
1996	Elements of Love: Ballads	—	—	—	—	—	—	—	—	—	—		Columbia
1996	Boogie Wonderland: The Very Best of Earth, Wind & Fire	—	—	—	—	—	—	—	—	—	29		Telstar
1996	Let's Groove: The Best Of	—	—	—	—	—	—	—	—	—	—	BPI: Gold	Columbia
1998	Greatest Hits	40	—	—	—	—	48	—	—	—	—	RIAJ: Gold	Columbia/Legacy
1999	The Ultimate Collection	—	—	—	—	—	—	—	—	—	34		Concept
1999	The Dutch Collection	—	—	—	—	27	—	—	—	—	—	NVPI: Gold	Sony Music
2002	The Essential Earth, Wind & Fire	—	91	60	—	—	—	—	—	—	—	RIAA: Gold	Sony Music/Legacy
2004	Love Songs	—	—	—	—	—	—	—	—	—	—		Sony Music/Legacy
2008	Playlist: The Very Best of Earth, Wind & Fire	—	89	—	—	—	—	—	—	—	—		Sony Music/Legacy
2010	The Greatest Hits	—	—	—	—	—	—	—	—	—	9	BPI: Gold	Sony Music/Legacy
2013	S.O.U.L: Earth, Wind & Fire	—	69	—	—	—	—	—	—	—	—		Sony Music/Legacy
2014	Ultimate Collection	—	—	—	—	—	—	—	—	—	68		Sony Music/Legacy
2015	The Classic Christmas Album	—	34	—	—	—	—	—	—	—	—		Sony Music/Legacy
2017	The Real... Earth, Wind & Fire	—	—	—	—	—	—	—	—	—	—		Sony Music/Legacy
2020	Gold	—	—	—	—	—	—	—	—	—	48		
"—" denotes a recording that did not chart or was not released in that territory.

== Singles ==
Year	Single	Peak chart positions										Certifications	Album
Year	Single	US	US R&B	US AC	US Dan	AUS	CAN	NLD	NZ	SWE	UK	Certifications	Album
1971	"Fan the Fire"	—	—	—	—	—	—	—	—	—	—		Earth, Wind and Fire
1971	"Love Is Life"	93	43	—	—	—	79	—	—	—	—		Earth, Wind and Fire
1972	"I Think About Lovin' You"	—	44	—	—	—	—	—	—	—	—		The Need of Love
1973	"Mom"	—	39	—	—	—	—	—	—	—	—		Last Days and Time
1973	"Evil"	50	25	19	—	—	—	—	—	—	—		Head to the Sky
1973	"Keep Your Head to the Sky"	52	23	—	—	—	45	—	—	—	—		Head to the Sky
1974	"Mighty Mighty"	29	4	—	—	—	38	—	—	—	—		Open Our Eyes
1974	"Kalimba Story"	55	6	—	—	—	63	—	—	—	—		Open Our Eyes
1974	"Devotion"	33	23	—	—	—	55	—	—	—	—		Open Our Eyes
1974	"Hot Dawgit" (with Ramsey Lewis)	50	61	—	—	—	—	—	—	—	—		Sun Goddess
1975	"Shining Star"	1	1	—	—	95	21	14	—	—	—	RIAA: Gold	That's the Way of the World
1975	"Sun Goddess" (with Ramsey Lewis)	44	20	—	—	—	—	—	—	—	—		Sun Goddess
1975	"That's the Way of the World"	12	5	—	—	—	20	—	—	—	—		That's the Way of the World
1975	"Sing a Song"	5	1	—	5	—	13	19	—	—	—	RIAA: Gold	Gratitude
1976	"Can't Hide Love"	39	11	—	—	—	97	—	—	—	—		Gratitude
1976	"Getaway"	12	1	—	12	—	29	—	—	—	—	RIAA: Gold	Spirit
1976	"Saturday Nite"	21	4	—	12	—	—	—	34	—	17		Spirit
1977	"On Your Face"	—	26	—	—	—	—	—	—	—	—		Spirit
1977	"Serpentine Fire"	13	1	—	—	—	13	—	32	—	57 (Note: Chart position is from the official UK "Breakers List".)		All 'n All
1978	"Fantasy"	32	12	—	—	25	37	7	13	8	14	BPI: Silver	All 'n All
1978	"Jupiter"	—	—	—	—	—	—	—	—	—	41		All 'n All
1978	"Magic Mind"	—	—	—	—	—	—	—	—	—	54		All 'n All
1978	"Got to Get You into My Life"	9	1	30	—	—	12	33	20	—	33	RIAA: Gold	The Best of Earth, Wind & Fire, Vol. 1
1978	"September"	8	1	41	—	12	10	19	12	13	3	RIAA: 6× Platinum; ARIA: 8× Platinum; BPI: 5× Platinum; RMNZ: 8× Platinum	The Best of Earth, Wind & Fire, Vol. 1
1979	"Boogie Wonderland" (with The Emotions)	6	2	—	14	6	11	4	7	7	4	RIAA: Gold; BPI: Platinum; RMNZ: Platinum	I Am
1979	"After the Love Has Gone"	2	2	3	—	—	11	11	28	8	4	RIAA: Gold; BPI: Silver; RMNZ: Gold	I Am
1979	"In the Stone"	58	23	—	—	78	76	39	—	53	53		I Am
1979	"Star"	64	47	—	—	—	—	—	15	25	16		I Am
1979	"Can't Let Go"	—	—	—	—	—	—	—	31	—	46		I Am
1980	"Let Me Talk"	44	8	—	85	—	86	—	50	—	29		Faces
1980	"You"	48	10	30	—	—	—	—	—	—	—		Faces
1980	"Back on the Road"	—	—	—	—	—	—	—	—	—	63		Faces
1981	"And Love Goes On"	59	15	—	—	57	—	25	—	—	—		Faces
1981	"Let's Groove"	3	1	—	3	15	7	5	2	—	3	RIAA: Gold; BPI: Platinum; RMNZ: 2× Platinum	Raise!
1982	"Wanna Be with You"	51	15	—	—	—	—	—	—	—	—		Raise!
1982	"I've Had Enough"	—	—	—	3	—	—	—	—	—	29		Raise!
1983	"Fall in Love with Me"	17	4	—	31	—	12	21	49	11	47		Powerlight
1983	"Side by Side"	76	15	—	—	—	—	—	—	—	—		Powerlight
1983	"Spread Your Love"	—	57	—	—	—	—	48	—	—	—		Powerlight
1983	"Magnetic"	57	10	—	36	—	—	18	—	—	92		Electric Universe
1984	"Touch"	—	23	36	—	—	—	—	—	—	—		Electric Universe
1984	"Moonwalk"	—	67	—	—	—	—	—	—	—	—		Electric Universe
1986	"Boogie Wonderland" (Extended Dance Mix)	—	—	—	—	—	—	—	—	—	97		The Collection
1987	"System of Survival"	60	1	—	1	—	—	14	9	—	54		Touch the World
1988	"Thinking of You"	67	3	—	1	—	—	45	—	—	94		Touch the World
1988	"Evil Roy"	—	22	—	38	—	—	—	—	—	—		Touch the World
1988	"You and I"	—	29	—	—	—	—	—	—	—	—		Touch the World
1988	"Turn On (The Beat Box)"	—	26	—	—	—	—	30	—	—	—		The Best of Earth, Wind & Fire, Vol. 2
1990	"Heritage" (featuring The Boys)	—	5	—	—	—	—	—	—	—	—		Heritage
1990	"For the Love of You" (featuring MC Hammer)	—	19	—	—	—	—	—	—	—	—		Heritage
1990	"Wanna Be the Man" (featuring MC Hammer)	—	46	—	—	146	—	—	—	—	—		Heritage
1993	"Sunday Morning"	53	20	35	—	—	33	26	—	—	—		Millennium
1993	"Spend the Night"	—	42	—	—	—	—	—	—	—	—		Millennium
1994	"Two Hearts"	—	88	—	—	—	—	—	—	—	—		Millennium
1994	"Blood Brothers" (Japan only)	—	—	—	—	—	—	—	—	—	—		Millennium
1997	"Revolution"	—	89	—	—	—	—	—	—	—	—		In the Name of Love
1997	"When Love Goes Wrong"	—	—	—	—	—	—	—	—	—	—		In the Name of Love
1999	"September '99"	—	—	—	—	94	—	25	—	48	25		The Ultimate Collection
1999	"Boogie Wonderland 99"	—	—	—	—	—	—	57	—	—	—		The Ultimate Collection
2002	"Remix Sampler"	—	—	—	—	—	—	—	—	—	81		The Essential Earth, Wind & Fire
2003	"All in the Way" (featuring The Emotions)	—	77	25	—	—	—	—	—	—	—		The Promise
2003	"Hold Me"	—	—	—	—	—	—	—	—	—	—		The Promise
2005	"The Way You Move" (featuring Kenny G)	—	—	12	—	—	—	—	—	—	—		Illumination
2005	"Pure Gold"	—	76	23	—	—	—	—	—	—	—		Illumination
2005	"Show Me the Way" (featuring Raphael Saadiq)	—	—	—	—	—	—	—	—	—	—		Illumination
2006	"To You" (featuring Brian McKnight)	—	71	—	—	—	—	—	—	—	—		Illumination
2006	"Change Your Mind"	—	—	—	—	—	—	—	—	—	—		In the Name of Love
2012	"Guiding Lights"	—	—	—	—	—	—	—	—	—			Now, Then & Forever
2013	"My Promise"	—	—	30	—	—	—	—	—	—	—		Now, Then & Forever
2013	"Something About You (Love the World)" (LL Cool J featuring Charlie Wilson, Earth, Wind & Fire and Melody Thornton)	—	—	—	—	—	—	—	—	—	—		Authentic
2014	"Never"	—	—	—	—	—	—	—	—	—	—		The Promise
2015	"Why?"	—	—	—	—	—	—	—	—	—	—		The Promise
2021	"You Want My Love" (featuring Lucky Daye)	—	—	—	—	—	—	—	— (Note: "You Want My Love" did not enter the NZ Top 40 Singles Chart, but peaked at number 37 on the NZ Hot Singles Chart.)	—	—		Non-album single
"—" denotes a recording that did not chart or was not released in that territory.

== Other appearances ==
Year	Song(s)	Source
1983	"Dance Dance Dance"	Rock & Rule soundtrack
1990	"One World"	Music Speaks Louder Than Words
1994	"Frontline of Seduction"	Blood Brothers & More
1996	"Sky" (with Bill Meyers)	All Things in Time
1999	"Holiday"	The PJs soundtrack
2000	"Runaway" (with Wyclef Jean)	The Ecleftic: 2 Sides II a Book
2002	"Whatever Happened"	Undercover Brother soundtrack
2002	"Fun & Free"	The Adventures of Pluto Nash
2004	"Voodoo Child (Slight Return)"	Power of Soul: A Tribute to Jimi Hendrix
2005	"After the Love Has Gone" (with Bill Champlin)	Love Songs
2005	"Gather Round"	Sounds of the Season: The NBC Holiday Collection
2009	"You" (with Chicago)	Serve4: Artists Against Hunger and Poverty
2009	"Get Your Hump on This Christmas" (featuring Cleveland Brown)	The Cleveland Show
2012	"Eyes of Hope" and "Insensitive"	Constellations: The Universe of Earth, Wind & Fire
2015	All	La La Time: The Roots of Earth, Wind & Fire
2016	"September" (with Justin Timberlake & Anna Kendrick)	Trolls soundtrack
2017	"Brazilian Rhyme" (Extended Mix)	single
2020	"I Feel the Light" (with Little Glee Monster)	Bright New World
2020	"Holidays" (with Meghan Trainor)	A Very Trainor Christmas
2022	"There'll Never Be" (with The Isley Brothers and El DeBarge)	Make Me Say It Again, Girl
2023	"Hollywood" (with Victoria Monét and Hazel Monét)	Jaguar II

== Videography ==
=== Video albums ===
Year ↑	Title	Certifications
1975	That's the Way of the World (film)	
1982	Earth, Wind & Fire: In Concert	
1992	The Eternal Vision	
1995	Millennium Concert	
1998	Live In Japan	
2001	Earth, Wind & Fire: Live	RIAA: Gold
	Shining Stars: The Official Story Of Earth, Wind & Fire	
2002	Earth, Wind & Fire: Live By Request	
2004	Earth, Wind & Fire: Live At Montreux 1997	RIAA: Gold
2005	The Collection	
2005	Chicago & Earth, Wind & Fire – Live at the Greek Theatre	RIAA: Platinum; MC: Platinum

=== Music videos ===
Year	Title	Album
1977	"Serpentine Fire"	All 'n All
1978	"September"	The Best of Earth, Wind & Fire, Vol. 1
1979	"Boogie Wonderland" (with The Emotions)	I Am
1979	"After the Love Has Gone"	I Am
1980	"Let Me Talk"	Faces
1981	"Let's Groove"	Raise!
1983	"Fall in Love with Me"	Powerlight
1983	"Magnetic"	Electric Universe
1987	"System of Survival"	Touch the World
1987	"Evil Roy"	Touch the World
1987	"Thinking of You"	Touch the World
1990	"Heritage" (featuring The Boys)	Heritage
1990	"Wanna Be the Man" (featuring MC Hammer)	Heritage
1993	"Sunday Morning"	Millennium
1993	"Spend the Night"	Millennium
2021	"You Want My Love" (featuring Lucky Daye)	non-album

=== Collaboration in a music video ===
Year	Title	Other Performer	Album
2020	"Holidays"	Meghan Trainor	A Very Trainor Christmas
