= Greatest Hits (Earth, Wind & Fire album) =

Compilation album by Earth, Wind & Fire
- Released: November 17, 1998
- Recorded: 1973–1981
- Genre: R&B
- Length: 70:22
- Label: Columbia/Legacy
- Producers: Maurice White; Al McKay; Charles Stepney; Joseph Wissert
- Compiler: Leo Sacks

Earth, Wind & Fire chronology
Let's Groove: The Best Of (1996)	Greatest Hits (1998)	The Ultimate Collection (1999)

Greatest Hits is a greatest hits album by American band Earth, Wind & Fire, released on November 17, 1998, by Columbia/Legacy Records. The album reached No. 40 on the Billboard 200 albums chart. The album was re-issued in 2008 by Columbia/Legacy.

== Critical reception ==
Professional ratings
Review scores
Source	Rating
AllMusic	5/5 stars
Detroit Free Press	4/4 stars

Terry Lawson of the Detroit Free Press called Greatest Hits a "stellar single disc distillation" and a "shimmering state of sonic funk perfection". Stephen Thomas Erlewine of AllMusic described the LP as "a terrifically entertaining and valuable disc". Jim DeRogatis of the Chicago Sun Times also described the album as "worth owning".

== Track listing ==
No.	Title	Writer(s)	Length
1.	"Shining Star" (from That's the Way of the World, 1975)	Philip Bailey, Larry Dunn, Maurice White	2:50
2.	"That's the Way of the World" (from That's the Way of the World)	Charles Stepney, M. White, Verdine White	5:43
3.	"September" (from The Best of Earth, Wind & Fire, Vol. 1, 1978)	Al McKay, M. White, Allee Willis	3:34
4.	"Can't Hide Love" (from Gratitude, 1975)	Skip Scarborough	4:07
5.	"Got to Get You Into My Life" (from Sgt. Pepper's Lonely Hearts Club Band, 1978)	John Lennon, Paul McCartney	4:10
6.	"Sing a Song" (from Gratitude)	McKay, M. White	3:22
7.	"Gratitude" (from Gratitude)	Bailey, Dunn, M. White, V. White	3:27
8.	"Serpentine Fire" (from All 'n All, 1977)	Sonny Burke, M. White, V. White	3:50
9.	"Fantasy" (from All 'n All)	Eduardo DelBarrio, M. White, V. White	4:36
10.	"Kalimba Story" (from Open Our Eyes, 1974)	M. White, V. White	4:00
11.	"Mighty Mighty" (from Open Our Eyes)	M. White, V. White	3:03
12.	"Reasons" (from That's the Way of the World)	Bailey, Stepney, M. White	4:58
13.	"Saturday Nite" (from Spirit, 1976)	Bailey, McKay, M. White	4:01
14.	"Let's Groove" (from Raise!, 1981)	Wayne Vaughn, M. White	5:35
15.	"Boogie Wonderland" (with The Emotions) (from I Am, 1979)	Jon Lind, Willis	4:47
16.	"After the Love Has Gone" (from I Am)	Bill Champlin, David Foster, Jay Graydon	4:24
17.	"Getaway" (from Spirit)	Peter Cor, Beloyd Taylor	3:55

== Personnel ==
- Robert Appere: Engineer
- Dorothy Ashby: Harp
- Philip Bailey: Congas, Percussion, Vocals
- Marilyn Baker: Viola
- Roland Bautista: Guitar
- Delores M. Bing: Cello
- George Bohannon: Trombone
- Oscar Brashear: Trumpet
- Elmer Brown: Trumpet
- Garnett Brown: Trombone
- Sherman Bryana: Violin
- Bobby Bryant: Trumpet
- Denyse Buffum: Viola
- David Campbell: Viola
- Ronald Clark: Violin
- Ronald Cooper: Cello
- Larry Corbett: Cello
- Steve Crimmel: Engineer
- Paulinho Da Costa: Percussion
- Rollice Dale: Viola
- Rahmlee Michael Davis: Flugelhorn, Trumpet
- Eduardo del Barrio: Keyboards, Piano, Synthesizer
- George Del Barrio: Keyboards, Piano, Synthesizer
- Marci Dicterow: Violin
- Assa Drori: Violin
- David Duke: French Horn
- James Dunham: Viola
- Larry Dunn: Associate Producer, Organ, Piano, Programming, Synthesizer
- The Emotions: Vocals (Background)
- Pavel Farkas: Violin
- Marie Fera: Cello
- Henry Ferber: Violin
- Chuck Findley: Trumpet
- David Foster: Keyboards, Piano, String Arrangements, Synthesizer
- Winterton Garvey: Violin
- Pamela Gates: Violin
- Harris Goldman: Concert Master, Violin
- Joseph Goodman: Violin
- Richard Goodman: Engineer
- Jack Gootkin: Violin
- Janice Gower: Concert Master
- Gary Grant: Trumpet
- Mick Guzauski: Engineer
- Michael Harris: Flugelhorn, Trumpet

- Jeanette Hawes: Vocals (Background)
- Jerry Hay: Horn Arrangements
- Marlo Henderson: Guitar
- William Henderson: Violin
- Jerry Hey: Trumpet
- Zakir Hussain: Tabla
- Wanda Hutchinson: Vocals (Background)
- Fred Jackson, Jr.: Saxophone
- Ralph Johnson: Drums, Percussion
- Thomas "Snake" Johnson: Tuba
- Dennis Karmazyn: Cello
- Jan Kelley: Cello
- Rick Kelly: Keyboards, Piano, Synthesizer
- Barbara Korn: French Horn
- Gina Kronstadt: Violin
- Carl LaMagna: Violin
- Azar Lawrence: Keyboards, Piano, Synthesizer
- Richard Lepore: Timpani
- Maxine Lewis: Keyboards, Piano, Synthesizer
- Linda Lipsett: Viola
- Joseph Livoti: Violin
- Charles Loper: Trombone
- Steve Lukather: Guitar
- Jacqueline Lustgarten: Cello
- Joy Lyle: Violin
- Steve Madaio: Trumpet
- Arthur Maebe: French Horn
- Virginia Majewski: Viola
- Miguel Martinez: Cello
- Harvey Mason, Sr.: Percussion
- George Massenburg: Engineer
- Lew McCreary: Trombone
- Al McKay: Guitar, Percussion, Producer, Vocals
- Bill Meyers: Horn Arrangements, String Arrangements
- Sidney Muldrow: French Horn
- Billy Myers: Keyboards, Piano, Synthesizer
- Don Myrick: Saxophone
- Ross Pallone: Engineer
- Richard Perissi: French Horn
- Tom Perry: Engineer
- Jerry Peters: Keyboards, Piano, Synthesizer
- The Phoenix Horns: Band
- Paul Polivnick: Viola
- Steve Porcaro: Keyboards, Piano, Synthesizer

- Benjamin Powell: Trombone
- William Frank "Bill" Reichenbach Jr.: Trombone
- Jerome Reisler: Violin
- Jerome Richardson: Saxophone
- Herman Riley: Saxophone
- Marilyn Robinson: French Horn
- Dean Rod: Engineer
- James Ross: Viola
- Henry Roth: Violin
- Sheldon Sanov: Violin
- Louis Satterfield: Trombone
- Skip Scarborough: Keyboards, Piano, Synthesizer
- Sandy Seemore: Violin
- Anton Sen: Violin
- Leena Sherman: Violin
- Haim Shtrum: Violin
- Harry Shultz: Cello
- Daniel Smith: Cello
- Robert Spano: Engineer
- Maurice Spears: Trombone
- Charles Stepney: Arranger, Associate Producer, Keyboards, Piano, Producer, Synthesizer
- Linn Subotnick: Viola
- Ilka Talvi: Violin
- Judith Talvi: Violin
- Beloyd Taylor: Guitar, Vocals (Background)
- Barbara Thomason: Viola
- Tom Tom 84: Arranger, Horn Arrangements, String Arrangements
- Kevan Torfeh: Cello
- Rosmen Torfeh: Violin
- Wayne Vaughn: Keyboards, Piano, Synthesizer
- Charles Veal: Concert Master
- John Walz: Cello
- Jerome Webster: Violin
- Fred White: Drums, Percussion
- Maurice White: Compilation Producer, Drums, Kalimba, Producer, Timbales, Vocals
- Verdine White: Associate Producer, Bass, Percussion, Vocals
- Sheila Whitt: Vocals (Background)
- Craig Widby: Engineer
- Mark Wilder: Mastering
- Joseph Wissert: Producer
- Larry Woods: Viola
- Andrew Woolfolk: Flute, Percussion, Sax (Soprano), Sax (Tenor)
- Benjamin F. Wright: Horn Arrangements, String Arrangements
- Ken Yerke: Violin

== Charts ==
Year	Chart	Peak position
1999	Japanese Albums (Oricon)	43
2013	US Billboard 200	40
2013	Italian Albums (FIMI)	89
2013	Dutch Midprice Top 50	6
2013	Dutch Combi Album Top 100	55
2016	French Albums	56
2016	Swiss Albums (Hitparade)	89

== Certifications ==
Region	Certification	Certified units/sales
Japan (RIAJ)	Gold	100,000^{^}
^{^} Shipments figures based on certification alone.
