= List of Earth, Wind & Fire band members =

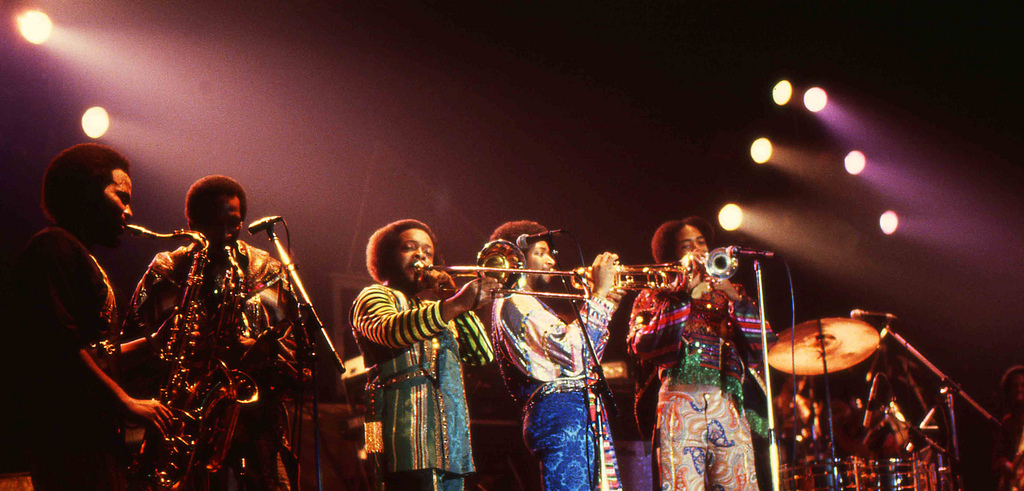
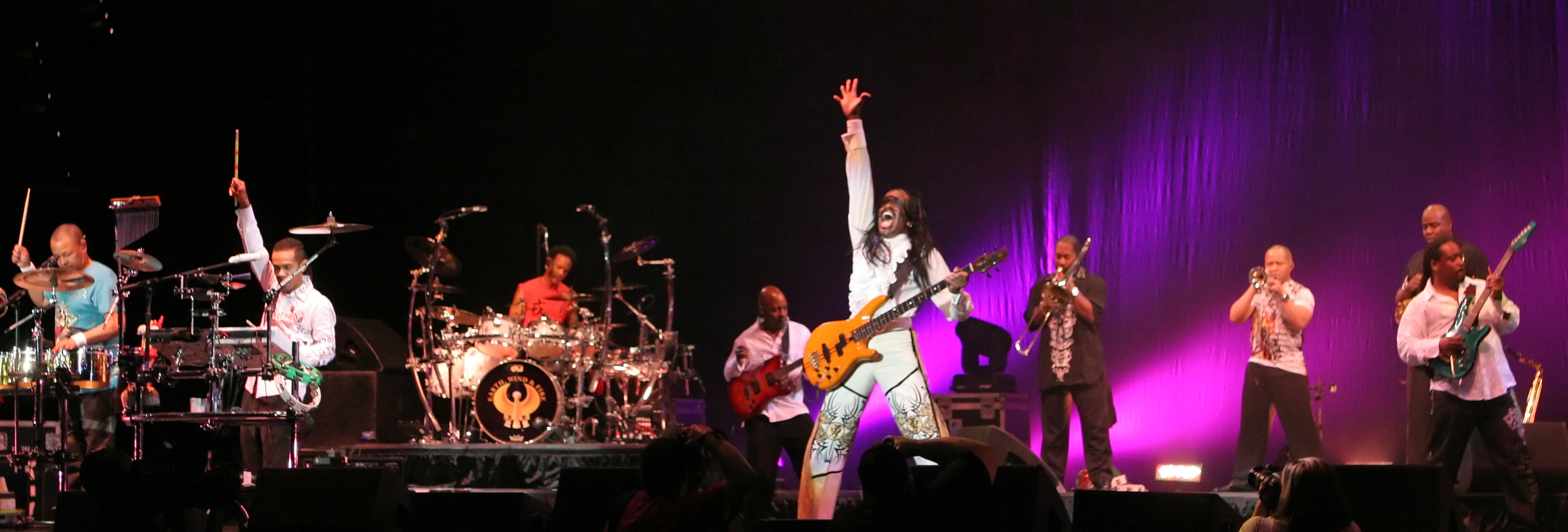

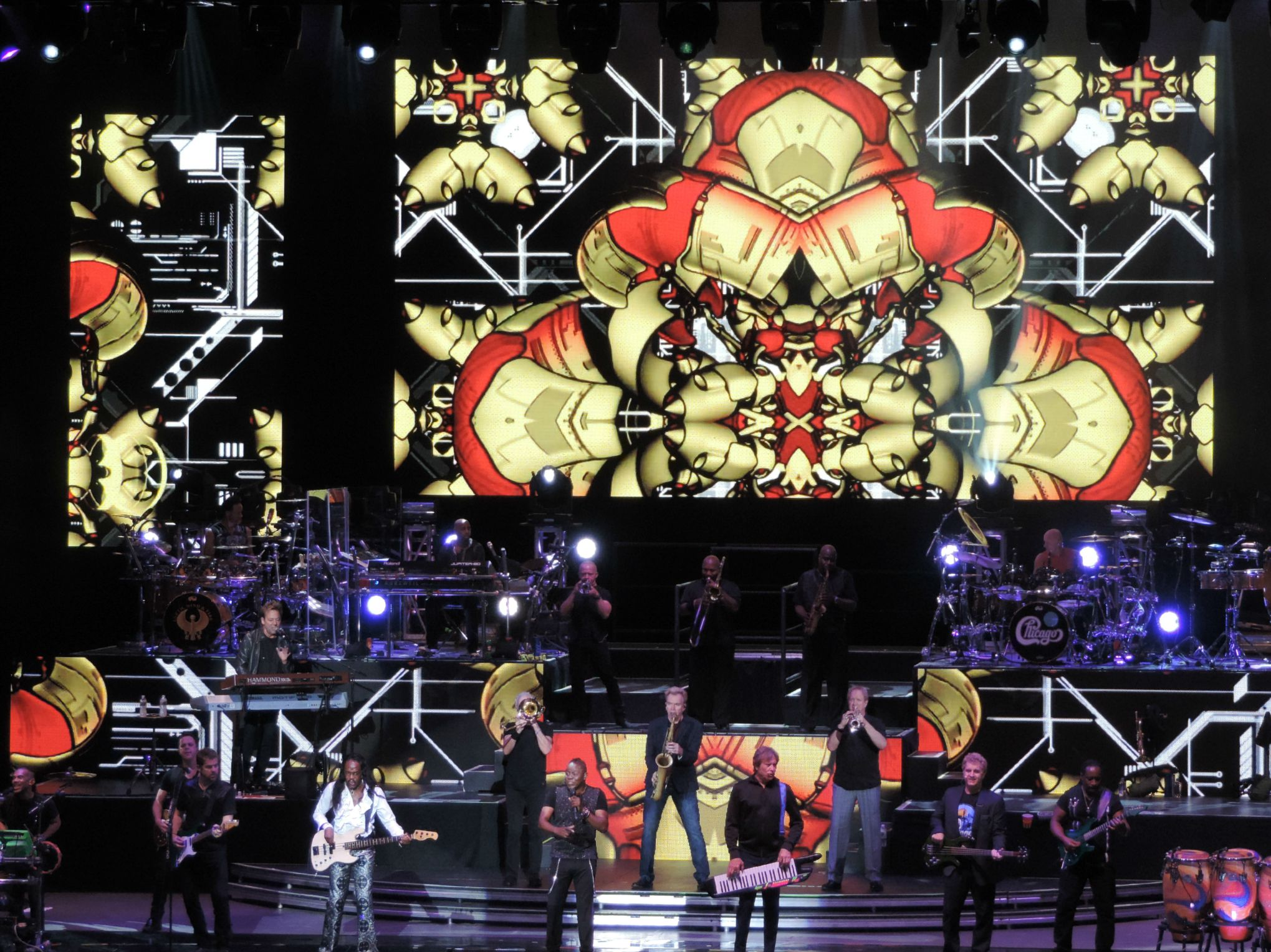
Also with Chicago.

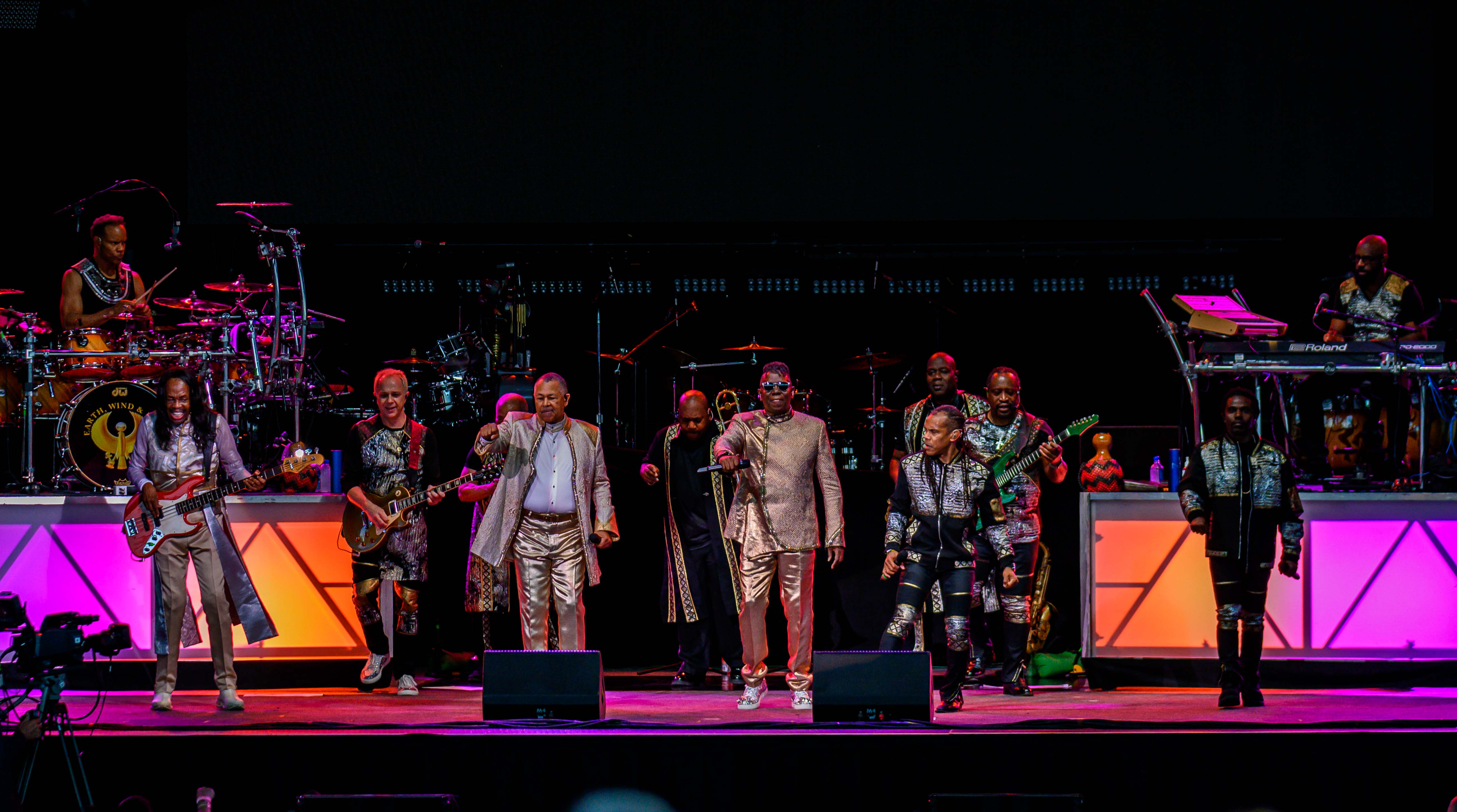
Various line-ups of Earth, Wind & Fire performing in 1982, 2004, 2009, 2015 and 2022

Earth, Wind & Fire is an American multi-genre band, founded by Maurice White (vocals, drums, percussion) in 1969. The band's original lineup included Maurice, his brother Verdine White (bass), guitarist Michael Beal, pianists and vocalists Wade Flemons and Don Whitehead, percussionist Yackov Ben Israel, vocalist Sherry Scott, trumpeter Leslie Drayton, trombonist Alexander Thomas and saxophonist Chester Washington.

The band, since Maurice's death in 2016, currently consists of Verdine (a constant member), vocalists/percussionists Philip Bailey, Ralph Johnson (both since 1972) and B. David Whitworth (since 1996), keyboardist Myron McKinley and drummer John Paris (both since 2001), lead guitarist Morris O'Connor (since 2008), vocalist Oshun Shango Oshunde (born Philip Doron Bailey Jr.) (since 2009), and rhythm guitarist Serg Dimitrijevic (since 2012).

== History ==
1969: Maurice White founded Earth, Wind & Fire with his friends Wade Flemons (vocals) and Don Whitehead (bass and keyboards) as a songwriting trio known as "The Salty Peppers". After releasing two singles the band moved from Chicago to Los Angeles, adding singer Sherry Scott, percussionist Yackov Ben Israel, and Maurice's brother Verdine on bass. The band soon changed its name to Earth, Wind & Fire. After auditioning in L.A., the band added Michael Beal on guitar, Chester Washington on reeds, Leslie Drayton on trumpet, and Alex Thomas on trombone.

1972: After releasing its second album the White brothers completely rebuilt the band, adding vocalist Helena Davis (soon replaced by Jessica Cleaves), woodwind player Ronnie Laws, guitarist Roland Bautista, keyboardist Larry Dunn, vocalist Philip Bailey and percussionist Ralph Johnson. After releasing another album, Laws and Bautista left the band. Laws was replaced by Bailey's school friend Andrew Woolfolk, and Bautista was replaced by Al McKay and Johnny Graham. This lineup recorded a new album.

1973: Following the new album's release, Jessica Cleaves left the band and was not replaced.

1974: the band was joined by Maurice and Verdine's brother Fred White as co-drummer.

1975: the band was expanded to feature a horn section, called the EWF or Phenix Horns, which featured Don Myrick on saxophone, Louis "Lui Lui" Satterfield on trombone, Rahmlee Michael Davis on trumpet, and Michael Harris on trumpet.

1981: Al McKay left and was replaced by the returning Bautista.

1984: After releasing three more albums, Maurice put the band on hiatus.

1987: The band returned with existing members Verdine and Maurice White, Ralph Johnson, Philip Bailey and Andrew Woolfolk, and new members guitarists/vocalists Sheldon Reynolds and Dick Smith, keyboardist Vance Taylor, and drummer Sonny Emory, as well as a new horn section dubbed Earth, Wind & Fire Horns which consisted of Gary Bias on the saxophone, Raymond Lee Brown on the trumpet, and Reggie Young on flugelhorn and trombone.

1991: Smith left the band.

1992–1994, the band was joined by second keyboardist Fred Ravel. Morris Pleasure replaced Vance Taylor in 1993, playing keyboards and bass, and David Romero played percussion between 1993 and 2002.

1996: B. David Whitworth joined on percussion and vocals in 1996.

1998: Robert Brookins joined on second keyboards.

1999: Emory was replaced by Gorden Campbell.

2001: Morris Pleasure left and was replaced by Myron McKinley. Bobby Gonzales joined as second guitarist and John Paris replaced Campbell in 2001.

2002: Sheldon Reynolds, David Romero and Bobby Gonzales all departed, replaced by guitarists John Johnson and Greg "G-Mo" Moore, percussionist Daniel de los Reyes, and Kimberly Brewer as female vocalist.

2004: Reynolds, Romero and Gonzales all left in 2004, along with keyboardist Robert Brookins. Krystal Bailey joined as female vocalist, though she was soon replaced by Kim Johnson.

2004: Vadim Zilbershtein joined as guitarist.

2008: Zilbershtein departed, replaced by Morris O'Connor.

2009: Bailey's son, Oshun Shango Oshunde (born Philip Doron Bailey Jr., also known as Lion From The Moon), joined as a vocalist in 2009.

2014: Moore left.

2012: the band was joined by rhythm guitarist Serg Dimitrijevic.

2016: Founder Maurice White died February 4. He was still a member of the band though he hadn't toured regularly for a few years.

== Members ==
=== Current ===
| Image | Name | Years active | Instruments | Release contributions |
|---|---|---|---|---|
| | Verdine White | 1969–1984; 1987–present | bass; percussion; vocals | all releases |
| | Philip Bailey | 1972–1984; 1987–present | vocals; conga; percussion; kalimba | all releases from Last Days and Time (1972) onwards |
| | Ralph Johnson | 1972–1984; 1987–present | drums; percussion; vocals | all releases from Last Days and Time (1972) onwards |
| | B. David Whitworth | 1996–present | percussion; vocals | The Promise (2003) |
| | Myron McKinley | 2001–present | keyboards; musical director | Illumination (2005); Now, Then & Forever (2013); Holiday (2014) |
| | John Paris | 2001–present | drums; vocals | The Promise (2003); Now, Then & Forever (2013); Holiday (2014) |
| | Morris O'Connor | 2008–present | lead guitar; vocals | Now, Then & Forever (2013); Holiday (2014) |
| | Oshun Shango Oshunde (born Philip Doron Bailey Jr., also known as Lion From The Moon) | 2009–present | vocals; percussion | |
| | Serg Dimitrijevic | 2012–present | rhythm guitar; vocals | Holiday (2014) |

=== Former ===
| Image | Name | Years active | Instruments | Release contributions |
|---|---|---|---|---|
| | Maurice White | 1969–1984; 1987–2016 (until his death) | vocals; kalimba; drums; percussion; band creator and leader | all releases from Earth, Wind & Fire (1971) to The Classic Christmas Album (2015) |
| | Wade Flemons | 1969–1972 (died 1993) | vocals; electric piano | Earth, Wind & Fire (1971); The Need of Love (1971) |
| | Michael Beal | 1969–1972 | guitar; harmonica | Earth, Wind & Fire (1971); The Need of Love (1971) |
| | Leslie Drayton | 1969–1972 | trumpet | Earth, Wind & Fire (1971); The Need of Love (1971) |
| | Yackov Ben Israel (aka Phillard Williams) | 1969–1972 | conga; percussion | Earth, Wind & Fire (1971); The Need of Love (1971) |
| | Sherry Scott | 1969–1972 | vocals | Earth, Wind & Fire (1971); The Need of Love (1971) |
| | Alexander Thomas | 1969–1972 | trombone | Earth, Wind & Fire (1971); The Need of Love (1971) |
| | Chester Washington | 1969–1972 | tenor saxophone | Earth, Wind & Fire (1971); The Need of Love (1971) |
| | Don Whitehead | 1969–1972 | acoustic/electric pianos; vocals | Earth, Wind & Fire (1971); The Need of Love (1971) |
| | Helena Dixon | 1972 | vocals | none |
| | Roland Bautista | 1972–1973; 1981–1984 (died 2012) | lead/rhythm guitar; vocals | Last Days and Time (1972); Raise! (1981); Powerlight (1983); Electric Universe (1983) |
| | Jessica Cleaves | 1972–1973 (died 2014) | vocals | Last Days and Time (1972); Head to the Sky (1973) |
| | Larry Dunn | 1972–1984 | keyboards; synthesizers; minimoog; musical director | Last Days and Time (1972); Head to the Sky (1973); Open Our Eyes (1974); That's the Way of the World (1975); Gratitude (1975); Spirit (1976); All 'n All (1977); Faces (1980); Raise! (1981); Powerlight (1983); Electric Universe (1983); Now, Then & Forever (2013) |
| | Ronnie Laws | 1972–1973 | flute; soprano/tenor saxophones | Last Days and Time (1972) |
| | Johnny Graham | 1973–1981 | lead/rhythm guitar; trumpet; percussion | Head to the Sky (1973); Open Our Eyes (1974); That's the Way of the World (1975); Gratitude (1975); Spirit (1976); All 'n All (1977); I Am (1979); Faces (1980); Raise! (1981) |
| | Al McKay | 1972, 1973–1980 | lead/rhythm guitar; sitar; percussion; vocals | Head to the Sky (1973); Open Our Eyes (1974); That's the Way of the World (1975); Gratitude (1975); Spirit (1976); All 'n All (1977); I Am (1979); Faces (1980) |
| | Andrew Woolfolk | 1973–1984; 1987–1993 (died 2022) | flute; saxophone; percussion | Head to the Sky (1973); Open Our Eyes (1974); That's the Way of the World (1975); Gratitude (1975); Spirit (1976); All 'n All (1977); I Am (1979); Faces (1980); Raise! (1981); Powerlight (1983); Electric Universe (1983); Touch the World (1987); Heritage (1990); Millennium (1993) |
| | Fred White | 1974–1984 (died 2023) | drums; percussion | That's the Way of the World (1975); Gratitude (1975); Spirit (1976); All 'n All (1977); I Am (1979); Faces (1980); Raise! (1981); Powerlight (1983); Electric Universe (1983) |
| | Beloyd Taylor | 1981–1982 (died 2014) | percussion (on tour – played guitar as session musician on albums); vocals | Raise! (1981); Powerlight (1983) |
| | Sonny Emory | 1987–1999 | drums; vocals | Heritage (1990); In the Name of Love (1997) |
| | Sheldon Reynolds | 1987–2002 (died 2023) | lead/rhythm guitar; vocals | Touch the World (1987); Heritage (1990); Millennium (1993); In the Name of Love (1997) |
| | Dick Smith | 1987–1991 | lead/rhythm guitar; vocals | Heritage (1990) |
| | David Lautrec | 1990 | keyboards | none |
| | Mike McKnight | 1987–1999 | technician; keyboards | none |
| | Vance Taylor | 1987–1993 | keyboards; musical director | none |
| | Freddie Ravel | 1993–1994 | keyboards; musical director | Millennium (1993); The Promise (2003) |
| | Morris Pleasure | 1993–2001 | keyboards; bass; musical director | In the Name of Love (1997) |
| | David Romero | 1993–2002 | percussion | In the Name of Love (1997) |
| | Robert Brookins | 1998–2004 (died 2009) | keyboards; vocals; musical director | none |
| | Gorden Campbell | 1999–2001 | drums | none |
| | Bobby Gonzales | 2001–2002 | lead/rhythm guitar; vocals | none |
| | Daniel de los Reyes | 2002–2004 | percussion | The Promise (2003) |
| | John Johnson | 2002–2004 | lead/rhythm guitar; vocals | none |
| | Kimberly Brewer | 2002–2004 | vocals | none |
| | Krystal Bailey | 2004 | vocals | none |
| | Kim Johnson | 2004–2009 | vocals | none |
| | Greg "G-Mo" Moore | 2002–2014 | rhythm guitar; vocals | none |
| | Vadim Zilbershtein | 2004–2008 | lead guitar; vocals | none |

=== Phenix Horns (1975–1983) / Earth, Wind & Fire Horns (1987–present) ===
==== Current ====
| Image | Name | Years active | Instruments | Release contributions |
|---|---|---|---|---|
| | Gary Bias | 1987–present | saxophone; flute | Millennium (1993); The Promise (2003); Illumination (2005); " Now, Then & Forever (2013) |
| | Reggie Young | 1987–present | trombone | Millennium (1993); In the Name of Love (1997); The Promise (2003); Illumination (2005); Now, Then & Forever (2013); Holiday (2014) |
| | Bobby Burns. Jr | 2004–present | trumpet | none |

==== Former ====
| Image | Name | Years active | Instruments | Release contributions |
|---|---|---|---|---|
| | Rahmlee Michael Davis | 1975–1983 | trumpet | I Am (1979); Faces (1980); Raise! (1981); Powerlight (1983) |
| | Michael Harris | 1975–1983 | trumpet | Gratitude (1975); Spirit (1976); All 'n All (1977); I Am (1979); Faces (1980); Raise! (1981); Powerlight (1983) |
| | Don Myrick | 1975–1983 (died 1993) | saxophone | Gratitude (1975); Spirit (1976); All 'n All (1977); I Am (1979); Faces (1980); Raise! (1981); Powerlight (1983) |
| | Louis Satterfield | 1975–1983 (died 2004) | trombone | Gratitude (1975); Spirit (1976); All 'n All (1977); I Am (1979); Faces (1980); Raise! (1981); Powerlight (1983) |
| | Elmer Brown | 1979 | trumpet | none |
| | Raymond Lee Brown | 1987–2004 | trumpet | none |

== Line-ups ==
The following is a complete chronology of the various line-ups of Earth, Wind & Fire, from the group's inception in 1971 until the present day.

| Period | Members | Studio releases |
|---|---|---|
| 1970–1972 | Maurice White – vocals, kalimba, drums, percussion; Verdine White – bass, percussion, vocals; Michael Beal – guitar, harmonica; Leslie Drayton – trumpet; Wade Flemons – electric piano, vocals; Yackov Ben Israel – conga, percussion; Sherry Scott – vocals; Alexander Thomas – trombone; Chester Washington – tenor saxophone; Don Whitehead – acoustic/electric pianos, vocals | Earth, Wind & Fire (1971); The Need of Love (1971) |
| 1972–1973 | Maurice White – vocals, kalimba, drums, percussion; Verdine White – bass, percussion, vocals; Philip Bailey – vocals, conga, percussion, kalimba; Roland Bautista – lead/rhythm guitar, vocals; Helena Davis – vocals; Jessica Cleaves – vocals; Larry Dunn – keyboards, synthesizers, minimoog, musical director; Ralph Johnson – drums, percussion, vocals; Ronnie Laws – flute, soprano/tenor saxophones | Last Days and Time (1972) |
| 1973 | Maurice White – vocals, kalimba, drums, percussion; Verdine White – bass, percussion, vocals; Philip Bailey – vocals, conga, percussion, kalimba; Jessica Cleaves – vocals; Larry Dunn – keyboards, synthesizers, minimoog, musical director; Ralph Johnson – drums, percussion, vocals; Johnny Graham – lead/rhythm guitar, trumpet, percussion; Al McKay – lead/rhythm guitar, sitar, percussion, vocals; Andrew Woolfolk – flute, saxophone, percussion | Head to the Sky (1973); Open Our Eyes (1974) |
| 1973–1981 | Maurice White – vocals, kalimba, drums, percussion; Verdine White – bass, percussion, vocals; Philip Bailey – vocals, conga, percussion, kalimba; Larry Dunn – keyboards, synthesizers, minimoog, musical director; Ralph Johnson – drums, percussion, vocals; Johnny Graham – lead/rhythm guitar, trumpet, percussion; Al McKay – lead/rhythm guitar, sitar, percussion, vocals; Andrew Woolfolk – flute, saxophone, percussion; Fred White – drums, percussion | That's the Way of the World (1975); Gratitude (1975); Spirit (1976); All 'n All (1977); I Am (1979); Faces (1980); Earth, Wind & Fire: In Concert (1982); That's the Way of the World: Alive in '75 (2002); Live in Rio (2002) |
| 1981–1982 | Maurice White – vocals, kalimba, drums, percussion; Verdine White – bass, percussion, vocals; Philip Bailey – vocals, conga, percussion, kalimba; Larry Dunn – keyboards, synthesizers, minimoog, musical director; Ralph Johnson – drums, percussion, vocals; Johnny Graham – lead/rhythm guitar, trumpet, percussion; Andrew Woolfolk – flute, saxophone, percussion; Fred White – drums, percussion; Roland Bautista – lead/rhythm guitar, vocals; Beloyd Taylor – percussion, vocals | Raise! (1981); Powerlight (1983) |
| 1982–1984 | Maurice White – vocals, kalimba, drums, percussion; Verdine White – bass, percussion, vocals; Philip Bailey – vocals, conga, percussion, kalimba; Larry Dunn – keyboards, synthesizers, minimoog, musical director; Ralph Johnson – drums, percussion, vocals; Johnny Graham – lead/rhythm guitar, trumpet, percussion; Andrew Woolfolk – flute, saxophone, percussion; Fred White – drums, percussion; Roland Bautista – lead/rhythm guitar, vocals | Electric Universe (1983) |
| 1984–1987 | Hiatus | |
| 1987–1991 | Maurice White – vocals, kalimba, drums, percussion; Verdine White – bass, percussion, vocals; Philip Bailey – vocals, conga, percussion, kalimba; Ralph Johnson – drums, percussion, vocals; Andrew Woolfolk – flute, saxophone, percussion; Sonny Emory – drums, vocals; Sheldon Reynolds – lead/rhythm guitar, vocals; David Lautrec – keyboards; Dick Smith – lead/rhythm guitar, vocals; Vance Taylor – keyboards | Touch the World (1987); Heritage (1990); Live in Japan (1998) |
| 1991–1992 | Maurice White – vocals, kalimba, drums, percussion; Verdine White – bass, percussion, vocals; Philip Bailey – vocals, conga, percussion, kalimba; Ralph Johnson – drums, percussion, vocals; Andrew Woolfolk – flute, saxophone, percussion; Sonny Emory – drums, vocals; Sheldon Reynolds – lead/rhythm guitar, vocals; Vance Taylor – keyboards | |
| 1992–1993 | Maurice White – vocals, kalimba, drums, percussion; Verdine White – bass, percussion, vocals; Philip Bailey – vocals, conga, percussion, kalimba; Ralph Johnson – drums, percussion, vocals; Andrew Woolfolk – flute, saxophone, percussion; Sonny Emory – drums, vocals; Sheldon Reynolds – lead/rhythm guitar, vocals; Vance Taylor – keyboards, musical director; Fred Ravel – keyboards | Millennium (1993) |
| 1993–1996 | Maurice White – vocals, kalimba, drums, percussion; Verdine White – bass, percussion, vocals; Philip Bailey – vocals, conga, percussion, kalimba; Ralph Johnson – drums, percussion, vocals; Carl Carwell – vocals; Sonny Emory – drums, vocals; Sheldon Reynolds – lead/rhythm guitar, vocals; Fred Ravel – keyboards, musical director; Morris Pleasure – keyboards, bass; David Romero – percussion | In the Name of Love (1997); Greatest Hits Live (1996); Earth, Wind & Fire: Live (2001) |
| 1996–1998 | Maurice White – vocals, kalimba, drums, percussion; Verdine White – bass, percussion, vocals; Philip Bailey – vocals, conga, percussion, kalimba; Ralph Johnson – drums, percussion, vocals; Carl Carwell – vocals; Sonny Emory – drums, vocals; Sheldon Reynolds – lead/rhythm guitar, vocals; Morris Pleasure – keyboards, bass, musical director; David Romero – percussion; Mike McKnight – keyboards; B. David Whitworth – percussion, vocals | |
| 1998–1999 | Maurice White – vocals, kalimba, drums, percussion; Verdine White – bass, percussion, vocals; Philip Bailey – vocals, conga, percussion, kalimba; Ralph Johnson – drums, percussion, vocals; Sonny Emory – drums, vocals; Sheldon Reynolds – lead/rhythm guitar, vocals; Morris Pleasure – keyboards, bass, musical director; David Romero – percussion; Mike McKnight – keyboards; B. David Whitworth – percussion, vocals; Robert Brookins – keyboards | |
| 1999–2001 | Maurice White – vocals, kalimba, drums, percussion; Verdine White – bass, percussion, vocals; Philip Bailey – vocals, conga, percussion, kalimba; Ralph Johnson – drums, percussion, vocals; Sheldon Reynolds – lead/rhythm guitar, vocals; Morris Pleasure – keyboards, bass, musical director; B. David Whitworth – percussion, vocals; Robert Brookins – keyboards; Gorden Campbell – drums | Earth, Wind & Fire: Live By Request (2002) |
| 2001–2002 | Maurice White – vocals, kalimba, drums, percussion; Verdine White – bass, percussion, vocals; Philip Bailey – vocals, conga, percussion, kalimba; Ralph Johnson – drums, percussion, vocals; Sheldon Reynolds – lead/rhythm guitar, vocals; B. David Whitworth – percussion, vocals; Robert Brookins – keyboards, musical director; Bobby Gonzales – lead/rhythm guitar, vocals; Myron McKinley – keyboards; John Paris – drums, vocals; Daniel de los Reyes – percussion | |
| 2002 | Maurice White – vocals, kalimba, drums, percussion; Verdine White – bass, percussion, vocals; Philip Bailey – vocals, conga, percussion, kalimba; Ralph Johnson – drums, percussion, vocals; B. David Whitworth – percussion, vocals; Robert Brookins – keyboards, musical director; Bobby Gonzales – lead/rhythm guitar, vocals; Myron McKinley – keyboards; John Paris – drums, vocals; Daniel de los Reyes – percussion; Kimberly Brewer – vocals; John Johnson – lead/rhythm guitar, vocals | |
| 2002–2004 | Maurice White – vocals, kalimba, drums, percussion; Verdine White – bass, percussion, vocals; Philip Bailey – vocals, conga, percussion, kalimba; Ralph Johnson – drums, percussion, vocals; B. David Whitworth – percussion, vocals; Robert Brookins – keyboards, musical director; Myron McKinley – keyboards; John Paris – drums, vocals; Daniel de los Reyes – percussion; Kimberly Brewer – vocals; John Johnson – lead/rhythm guitar, vocals | The Promise (2003) |
| 2004 | Maurice White – vocals, kalimba, drums, percussion; Verdine White – bass, percussion, vocals; Philip Bailey – vocals, conga, percussion, kalimba; Ralph Johnson – drums, percussion, vocals; B. David Whitworth – percussion, vocals; Myron McKinley – keyboards, musical director; John Paris – drums, vocals; Krystal Bailey – vocals; Kim Johnson – vocals; Greg "G-Mo" Moore – rhythm guitar, vocals; Vadim Zilberstein – lead guitar, vocals | |
| 2004–2008 | Maurice White – vocals, kalimba, drums, percussion; Verdine White – bass, percussion, vocals; Philip Bailey – vocals, conga, percussion, kalimba; Ralph Johnson – drums, percussion, vocals; B. David Whitworth – percussion, vocals; Myron McKinley – keyboards, musical director; John Paris – drums, vocals; Kim Johnson – vocals; Greg "G-Mo" Moore – rhythm guitar, vocals; Vadim Zilberstein – lead guitar, vocals | Illumination (2005) |
| 2008–2012 | Maurice White – vocals, kalimba, drums, percussion; Verdine White – bass, percussion, vocals; Philip Bailey – vocals, conga, percussion, kalimba; Ralph Johnson – drums, percussion, vocals; B. David Whitworth – percussion, vocals; Myron McKinley – keyboards, musical director; John Paris – drums, vocals; Kim Johnson – vocals; Greg "G-Mo" Moore – rhythm guitar, vocals; Oshun Shango Oshunde (born Philip Doron Bailey Jr.) – vocals, percussion; Morris O'Connor – lead guitar, vocals | |
| 2012–2016 | Maurice White – vocals, kalimba, drums, percussion; Verdine White – bass, percussion, vocals; Philip Bailey – vocals, conga, percussion, kalimba; Ralph Johnson – drums, percussion, vocals; B. David Whitworth – percussion, vocals; Myron McKinley – keyboards, musical director; John Paris – drums, vocals; Oshun Shango Oshunde (born Philip Doron Bailey Jr.) – vocals, percussion; Morris O'Connor – lead guitar, vocals; Serg Dimitrijevic – rhythm guitar, vocals | Now, Then & Forever (2013); Holiday (2014); The Classic Christmas Album (2015) |
| 2016–2026 | Philip Bailey – vocals, conga, percussion, kalimba; Verdine White – bass, percussion, vocals; Ralph Johnson – drums, percussion, vocals; B. David Whitworth – percussion, vocals; Myron McKinley – keyboards, musical director; John Paris – drums, vocals; Oshun Shango Oshunde (born Philip Doron Bailey Jr.) – vocals, percussion; Morris O'Connor – lead guitar, vocals; Serg Dimitrijevic – rhythm guitar, vocals | |
| 2026–present | Philip Bailey – vocals, conga, percussion, kalimba; Verdine White – bass, percussion, vocals; Ralph Johnson – drums, percussion, vocals; B. David Whitworth – percussion, vocals; Myron McKinley – keyboards, musical director; John Paris – drums, vocals; Oshun Shango Oshunde (born Philip Doron Bailey Jr.) – vocals, percussion; Morris O'Connor – guitar, vocals | |
