= Earth, Wind & Fire: Live =

Video by Earth, Wind & Fire
- Released: 2001
- Genre: R&B
- Length: 60:00
- Label: Image Entertainment; Polygram Video

Earth, Wind & Fire chronology
The Ultimate Collection (1999)	Earth, Wind & Fire: Live (2001)	Shining Stars: The Official Story Of Earth, Wind & Fire (2001)

Earth, Wind & Fire: Live is a DVD released by the band Earth, Wind & Fire in 2001 on Image Entertainment, and Polygram Video. The DVD has been certified Gold in the US by the RIAA.

== Overview ==
Earth, Wind & Fire: Live was recorded during a 1994 concert by the band in Japan.

== Critical reception ==
Perry Siebert of Allmusic described Earth, Wind & Fire: Live as "a great disc for fans of the band that makes good use of DVD technology with the multiple angle capabilities".

== Set list ==
1. "September"
2. "Let Your Feelings Show"
3. "Let's Groove"
4. "Runnin'"
5. "Boogie Wonderland"
6. "Can't Hide Love"
7. "Fantasy"
8. "Kalimba Interlude"
9. "Evil"
10. "Shining Star"
11. "Keep Your Head to the Sky"
12. "Reasons"
13. "Sing a Song"
14. "That's the Way of the World"
15. "Wouldn't Change a Thing About You"
16. "After the Love Has Gone"
17. "System of Survival"
18. Bonus: Encore - "Sunday Morning"

== Credits ==
- Maurice White -Vocals/timbales/kalimba
- Phillip Bailey- Vocals/percussion
- Verdine White - Bass
- Ralph Johnson - Vocals/percussion
- Sheldon Reynolds - Vocals/guitar
- Sonny Emory - Drums
- Freddie Ravel - Vocals/keyboards/musical direction
- Morris Pleasure - Keyboards
- Raymond Lee Brown - Trumpet
- Gary Bias - Saxophones
- Reggie Young - Trombone
- Michael McKnight - Keyboards
