= Greatest Hits Live (Earth, Wind & Fire album) =

Live album by Earth, Wind & Fire
- Released: October 29, 1996
- Recorded: April 20, 1995
- Venue: Velfarre, Tokyo, Japan
- Genre: R&B
- Label: Rhino
- Producer: Maurice White

Earth, Wind & Fire chronology
Boogie Wonderland: The Very Best of Earth, Wind & Fire (1996)	Greatest Hits Live (1996)	Let's Groove: The Best of Earth, Wind & Fire (1997)

Greatest Hits Live is a live album by American band Earth, Wind & Fire issued in 1996 on Rhino Records.

== Overview ==
Greatest Hits Live was recorded at Velfarre, Tokyo, Japan. The album was previously issued as Plugged in Live and Live in Velfarre.

== Critical reception ==
Professional ratings
Review scores
Source	Rating
AllMusic	2.5/5 stars
Muzik	4.5/5 stars

Leo Stanley of Allmusic gave a 2.5 out of 5 stars rating calling the album "a fun performance for dedicated fans". With a 4.5 out of 5 stars rating Bob Jones of Muzik described Greatest Hits Live as "a faultless collection."

== Track listing ==
Adapted from album's text.

No.	Title	Writer(s)	Length
1.	"In the Stone"	David Foster, Maurice White, Allee Willis	2:42
2.	"September"	Al McKay, Maurice White, Allee Willis	2:27
3.	"Let Your Feelings Show"	David Foster, Maurice White, Allee Willis	1:37
4.	"Let's Groove"	Wayne Vaughn, Maurice White	3:10
5.	"Sun Goddess"	Jon Lind, Maurice White	5:37
6.	"Can't Hide Love"	Skip Scarborough	3:25
7.	"Boogie Wonderland"	Jon Lind, Allee Willis	3:21
8.	"Fantasy"	Eddie DelBarrio, Maurice White, Verdine White	5:23
9.	"Reasons"	Philip Bailey, Charles Stepney, Maurice White	7:38
10.	"That's the Way of the World"	Charles Stepney, Maurice White, Verdine White	5:25
11.	"Africano"	Larry Dunn, Maurice White	5:54
12.	"I'll Write a Song for You"	Philip Bailey, Steve Beckmeier, Al McKay	3:26
13.	"Be Ever Wonderful"	Larry Dunn, Maurice White	3:43
14.	"After the Love Has Gone"	Bill Champlin, David Foster, Jay Graydon	4:42
15.	"Shining Star"	Philip Bailey, Larry Dunn, Maurice White	4:36
16.	"System of Survival"	Skylark	5:48
17.	"Sing a Song"	Al McKay, Maurice White	1:30
18.	"Devotion"	Philip Bailey, Maurice White	5:02

== Personnel ==
Adapted from album's text.

- Philip Bailey: Percussion, vocals
- Ray Brown: Trumpet
- Carl Carlwell: Vocals
- Sonny Emory: Drums
- Scott Mayo: Saxophone
- Mike McKnight: Keyboards
- Morris Pleasure: Keyboards
- Sheldon Reynolds: Guitar, vocals
- David Romero: Percussion
- Maurice White: Kalimba, percussion, vocals
- Verdine White: Bass
- Reggie C. Young: Trombone

== Charts ==
Chart (1996)	Peak position
SWE Sverigetopplistan	36
Japanese Albums (Oricon)	43
UK Blues & Soul Top UK R&B Albums	48
