= The Eternal Dance =

Box set by Earth, Wind & Fire
- Released: September 8, 1992
- Recorded: 1971−1989
- Genres: R&B; Soul; Disco; Funk
- Length: 188:43
- Label: Columbia
- Producers: Maurice White; Charles Stepney; Joseph Wissert

Earth, Wind & Fire chronology
Heritage (1990)	The Eternal Dance (1992)	The Very Best of Earth, Wind & Fire (1992)

The Eternal Dance is a compilation album by American band Earth, Wind & Fire issued in September 1992 on Columbia Records.

== Critical reception ==
Professional ratings
Review scores
Source	Rating
AllMusic	4.5/5 stars
The Baltimore Sun	3/4 stars
Entertainment Weekly	B
Los Angeles Daily News	(favourable)
The New York Times	(favorable)
Philadelphia Inquirer	4/4 stars
Rolling Stone	3.5/5 stars
Select	3/5 medals
The Washington Post	(favourable)

J.D. Considine of The Baltimore Sun declared that "though this set shows off all sides of the EWF sound, its reliance on outtakes and unreleased live material underscores just how much instrumental sparkle this crew could muster." Ann Powers of The New York Times noted "a fan's attention may fade over the course of the album's four hours; but this music always meant to make memories, sounds as nice in the background as it does up close". Stephen Thomas Erlewine of AllMusic called the box set "essential for hardcore Earth, Wind & Fire fans"

Patricia Smith of The Boston Globe also placed The Eternal Dance on her lists of the top ten recordings of both 1992 and 1993.

== Track listing ==
Disc one
No.	Title	Writer(s)	Length
1.	"Fan the Fire"	Wade Flemons, Maurice White, Don Whitehead	4:58
2.	"Love Is Life"	Wade Flemons, Maurice White, Don Whitehead	5:02
3.	"I Think About Lovin' You"	Sherry Scott	5:58
4.	"Interlude*"	Larry Dunn	0:52
5.	"Time Is on Your Side"	Roland Bautista, Maurice White, Verdine White	3:39
6.	"Where Have All the Flowers Gone?"	Pete Seeger	4:52
7.	"Power"	Maurice White	8:11
8.	"Keep Your Head to the Sky"	Maurice White	5:10
9.	"Evil"	Philip Bailey, Maurice White	4:58
10.	"Mighty Mighty"	Maurice White, Verdine White	3:03
11.	"Feelin' Blue"	Kenny Altman	4:25
12.	"Hey Girl (Interlude)*"	Charles Stepney, Maurice White	0:35
13.	"Open Our Eyes"	Leon Lumkins	5:06
14.	"Shining Star (alternate mix)*"	Philip Bailey, Sonny Burke, Larry Dunn, Maurice White, Verdine White	3:24
15.	"Happy Feelin'"	Philip Bailey, Larry Dunn, Al McKay, Maurice White, Verdine White	3:18
16.	"Reasons"	Philip Bailey, Charles Stepney, Maurice White	4:59
17.	"Shining Star (original album version)"	Philip Bailey, Larry Dunn, Al McKay, Maurice White, Verdine White	2:50
18.	"That's the Way of the World"	Philip Bailey, Charles Stepney, Maurice White, Verdine White	5:44

Disc two
No.	Title	Writer(s)	Length
1.	"Kalimba Story/Sing a Message to You [live]**"	Maurice White, Verdine White	7:23
2.	"Head to the Sky/Devotion [live]**"	Philip Bailey, Maurice White	6:28
3.	"Sun Goddess [live]"	Jon Lind, Maurice White	7:37
4.	"Mighty Mighty [live]*"	Maurice White, Verdine White	5:03
5.	"Interlude"	Maurice White	0:27
6.	"Can't Hide Love"	Skip Scarborough	4:07
7.	"Sing a Song"	Al McKay, Maurice White	3:24
8.	"Sunshine"	Philip Bailey, Larry Dunn, Al McKay, Maurice White	4:16
9.	"Getaway***"	Peter Cor, Beloyd Taylor	3:57
10.	"Saturday Nite"	Philip Bailey, Al McKay, Maurice White	4:03
11.	"Spirit"	Larry Dunn, Maurice White	3:11
12.	"Ponta de Areia - Brazilian Rhyme (Interlude)**"	Fernando Brant, Milton Nascimento	2:08
13.	"Fantasy"	Eduardo del Barrio, Maurice White, Verdine White	4:38
14.	"Serpentine Fire"	Sonny Burke, Maurice White, Verdine White	3:51
15.	"I'll Write a Song for You"	Philip Bailey, Steve Beckmeier, Al McKay	3:18
16.	"Be Ever Wonderful"	Larry Dunn, Maurice White	5:07
17.	"Beijo (Interlude) (a.k.a. Brazilian Rhyme)"	Maurice White	1:20
18.	"Got to Get You into My Life"	John Lennon, Paul McCartney	4:10

Disc three
No.	Title	Writer(s)	Length
1.	"September"	Al McKay, Maurice White, Allee Willis	3:35
2.	"Boogie Wonderland"	Jon Lind, Allee Willis	4:48
3.	"After the Love Has Gone"	Bill Champlin, David Foster, Jay Graydon	4:25
4.	"In the Stone"	David Foster, Maurice White, Allee Willis	4:25
5.	"Dirty (Interlude)*"	Maurice White	0:52
6.	"Let Me Talk"	Philip Bailey, Larry Dunn, Ralph Johnson, Al McKay, Maurice White, Verdine White	4:07
7.	"And Love Goes On"	Larry Dunn, David Foster, Brenda Russell, Maurice White, Verdine White	4:03
8.	"Pride"	Philip Bailey, Larry Dunn, Al McKay, Maurice White, Verdine White	4:11
9.	"Demo*"	Barry Mann, Maurice White	1:30
10.	"Let's Groove"	Wayne Vaughn, Maurice White	5:37
11.	"Wanna Be With You"	Wayne Vaughn, Maurice White	4:35
12.	"Little Girl (Interlude)*"		0:17
13.	"Night Dreamin'*"	Wornell Jones, Maxayn Lewis	2:58
14.	"Fall in Love With Me"	Wanda Vaughn, Wayne Vaughn, Maurice White	5:47
15.	"Magnetic"	Martin Page	4:20
16.	"System of Survival"	Skylark	4:59
17.	"Thinking of You"	Wanda Vaughn, Wayne Vaughn, Maurice White	4:39
18.	"Gotta Find Out****"	Victor Hill, Bernard Spears, Billy Young	5:44
19.	"That's the Way of the World [live]^"	Charles Stepney, Maurice White, Verdine White	7:36

Key

- (*) Previously unreleased
- (**) Portions previously unreleased
- (***) Additional unreleased intro
- (****) Released as B-side and international editions of Heritage
- (^) Previously unavailable on album

== Certifications ==
Certifications for The Eternal Dance
Region	Certification	Certified units/sales
New Zealand (RMNZ)	Platinum	15,000^{‡}
^{‡} Sales+streaming figures based on certification alone.

== Accolades ==
Publication	Author	Country	Accolade	Year	Rank
Boston Globe	Patricia Smith	U.S	The Year's Top 10 Recordings	1992	3
Boston Globe	Patricia Smith	U.S	The Year's Top 10 Recordings	1993	*
