= The Best of Earth, Wind & Fire, Vol. 1 =

Greatest hits album by Earth, Wind & Fire
- Released: November 23, 1978
- Genres: R&B; soul; pop; jazz; disco
- Length: 40:22
- Label: ARC/Columbia
- Producers: Maurice White; Charles Stepney

Earth, Wind & Fire chronology
All 'n All (1977)	The Best of Earth, Wind & Fire, Vol. 1 (1978)	I Am (1979)

Singles from Vol. 1
- 1. "Got to Get You Into My Life" Released: July 14, 1978; 2. "September" Released: November 18, 1978

The Best of Earth, Wind & Fire, Vol. 1 is the first greatest hits album by the American band Earth, Wind & Fire issued on November 23, 1978, by ARC/Columbia Records. The album peaked at No. 3 on the Billboard Top Soul Albums chart and No. 6 on the Top LPs chart. The Best of Earth, Wind & Fire, Vol. 1 has been certified quintuple platinum in the US by the RIAA, and platinum in both the UK and Canada, by the BPI and Music Canada, respectively.

== Background ==
Produced by Maurice White, The Best of Earth, Wind & Fire, Vol. 1 was the first album released by ARC Records, his subsidiary record label. A 1999 reissue featured two bonus tracks entitled MegaMix and MegaMix 2000.

== Singles ==
The album produced two new songs: "Love Music" and "September". "September" was released a week prior the album release and peaked at Nos. 1 and 8 on the Billboard Hot Soul Songs and Hot 100 charts, respectively. "September" reached No. 3 on the UK Pop Singles chart.

Another 1978 single, "Got to Get You into My Life", preceded the album by a few months and was first included on the 1978 soundtrack Sgt. Pepper's Lonely Hearts Club Band from the feature film with the same title. The single reached Nos. 1 and 9 on the Billboard Hot Soul Songs and Hot 100 charts, respectively. "Got to Get You into My Life" was Grammy nominated in the category of Best Pop Vocal Performance by a Duo, Group or Chorus. The song went on to win a Grammy for Best Instrumental Arrangement Accompanying Vocalist(s).

== Critical reception ==
Professional ratings
Review scores
Source	Rating
AllMusic	5/5 stars
Los Angeles Times	3/4 stars
The Rolling Stone Album Guide	5/5 stars
The Village Voice	A−

The Los Angeles Times called the album "An excellent package with no extraneous or weak tracks". Steve Huey of AllMusic in a 5/5 review retrospectively remarked, "But even if it's an incomplete hits collection, The Best of Earth, Wind & Fire, Vol. 1 still ranks as a strong encapsulation of EWF the funk innovators. The singles gathered here constitute some of the richest, most sophisticated music the funk movement ever produced; when the absolute cream of the group's catalog is heard in such a concentrated fashion, the effect is dazzling...an excellent listen." Robert Christgau of The Village Voice in an A− review found, "Despite some annoying omissions, notably 'Serpentine Fire,' this sums them up--ten exquisitely crafted pop tunes in which all the passion and resonance of black music tradition are blended into a concoction slicker and more sumptuous than any white counterpart since Glenn Miller". The New York Daily News also claimed "Since its beginning, Earth Wind and Fire have been one of the slickest soul aggregations around, and this record is a well-paced showcase. Sometimes it's hard to believe that the combination of influences, ranging from Sly Stone and Stevie Wonder to the decidedly Chicagoesque horn arrangements, doesn't overcome the group, but its high spirits continually take it over the top." Crispin Cioe of High Fidelity wrote "For pop/r&b mavens, this one's a must."

== Track listing ==
Side one
No.	Title	Writer(s)	Length
1.	"Got to Get You into My Life" (from Sgt. Pepper's Lonely Hearts Club Band, 1978)	John Lennon; Paul McCartney	4:03
2.	"Fantasy (Single Version)" (from All 'n All, 1977)	Del Barrio; Maurice White; Verdine White	3:46
3.	"Can't Hide Love" (from Gratitude, 1975)	Skip Scarborough	4:10
4.	"Love Music" (previously unreleased)	Scarborough	3:55
5.	"Getaway" (from Spirit, 1976)	Peter Cor; Bernard "Beloyd" Taylor	3:46

Side two
No.	Title	Writer(s)	Length
6.	"That's the Way of the World" (from That's the Way of the World, 1975)	Charles Stepney; M. White; V. White	5:46
7.	"September" (previously unreleased)	Al McKay; Allee Willis; M. White	3:36
8.	"Shining Star" (from That's the Way of the World, 1975)	Philip Bailey; Larry Dunn; M. White	2:50
9.	"Reasons" (from That's the Way of the World, 1975)	Bailey; Stepney; M. White	4:59
10.	"Sing a Song" (from Gratitude, 1975)	McKay; M. White	3:23

Reissue bonus tracks
No.	Title	Writer(s)	Length
11.	"MegaMix 2000"	Wayne Vaughn; McKay; M. White; Willis	7:38
12.	"MegaMix" (radio edit)	McKay; M. White	3:23
Total length:			49:55

== Personnel ==
=== Performance ===
- Philip Bailey – vocals, percussion
- Rhamlee Michael Davis – trumpet, flugelhorn
- Larry Dunn – keyboards
- Johnny Graham – guitar, percussion
- Michael Harris – trumpet, flugelhorn
- Alan Hewitt – keyboards
- Ralph Johnson – drums, percussion
- Al McKay – guitar, percussion
- Don Myrick – saxophone
- Louis Satterfield – trombone
- Dick Smith – guitar
- Fred White – drums
- Maurice White – vocals, drums, percussion
- Verdine White – bass
- Andrew Woolfolk – saxophone, flute

=== Production ===
- Philip Bailey – liner notes
- George Calle – producer, audio engineer, audio mixing
- Mauro DeSantis – producer, engineer, mixing
- Larry Dunn – production assistant
- Earth, Wind & Fire – arranger
- Howard Fritzson – art direction
- David Gahr – photography
- Jay Graydon – songwriter
- Alan Hewitt – programming, producer, engineer, mixing
- Paul Klingberg – producer, engineer, mixing
- Art Macnow – director
- Cameron Marcarelli – assistant engineer
- Al McKay – producer
- Shusei Nagaoka – artwork
- Steve Newman – design
- Joseph M. Palmaccio – mastering
- Leo Sacks – producer, liner notes, reissue producer
- Richard Salvato – director
- Jim Shea – photography
- Charles Stepney – arranger, producer
- Tom Tom 84 – horn arrangements, string arrangements
- Chris Walter – photography
- Maurice White – arranger, producer, engineer, liner notes, sixing
- Verdine White – liner notes, production assistant
- Mark Wilder – audio mastering
- Joseph Wissert – producer

== Charts ==
=== Weekly charts ===
Chart performance for The Best of Earth, Wind & Fire, Vol. 1
Chart (1979)	Peak position
Australian Albums (Kent Music Report)	7
Canada Top Albums/CDs (RPM)	15
Finland (Suomen virallinen albumlista)	7
Dutch Albums (Album Top 100)	19
German Albums (Offizielle Top 100)	28
Japanese Albums (Oricon)	12
New Zealand Albums (RMNZ)	3
Swedish Albums (Sverigetopplistan)	13
UK Albums (OCC)	6
US Billboard 200	6
US Top R&B/Hip-Hop Albums (Billboard)	3

=== Year-end charts ===
Chart (1979)	Position
New Zealand Albums (RMNZ)	18
US Billboard 200	24

Singles
Year	Single	Chart	Position
1978	"Got to Get You into My Life"	Billboard Top Soul Singles	1
1978	"Got to Get You into My Life"	Billboard Hot 100	9
1978	"Got to Get You into My Life"	UK Singles	33
1978	"Got to Get You into My Life"	Dutch Single Top 100	33
1979	"September"	Billboard Top Soul Singles	1
1979	"September"	Billboard Hot 100	8
1979	"September"	UK Singles	3
1979	"September"	Swedish Singles (Sverigetopplistan)	13

== Certifications and sales ==
Certifications and sales for The Best of Earth, Wind & Fire, Vol. 1
Region	Certification	Certified units/sales
Canada (Music Canada)	Platinum	100,000^{^}
Japan	—	161,810
Netherlands (NVPI)	Gold	50,000^{^}
United Kingdom (BPI)	Platinum	300,000^{^}
United States (RIAA)	5× Platinum	5,000,000^{^}
^{^} Shipments figures based on certification alone.
