= The Collection (Earth, Wind & Fire album) =

Compilation album by Earth, Wind & Fire
- Released: 1986
- Genre: R&B
- Label: K-Tel
- Producer: Maurice White

Earth, Wind & Fire chronology
Electric Universe (1983)	The Collection (1986)	Touch the World (1987)

Professional ratings
Review scores
Source	Rating
AllMusic	3/5 stars

The Collection is a compilation album by American band Earth, Wind & Fire issued in 1986 on K-Tel Records. The album reached No. 5 on the UK Pop Albums chart and was certified Gold in the UK by the BPI.

== Track listings ==
=== CD ===
1. Boogie Wonderland (featuring The Emotions)
2. Let's Groove
3. Serpentine Fire
4. That's The Way Of The World
5. Shining Star
6. After The Love Has Gone
7. Let Me Talk
8. September
9. Got To Get You Into My Life
10. Saturday Nite
11. Jupiter
12. I've Had Enough
13. Star
14. Can't Let Go
15. Fantasy

=== Double LP ===
Side 1

1. September
2. Serpentine Fire
3. Let Me Talk
4. Fall In Love With Me
5. Can't Let Go
6. Fantasy

Side 2

1. Boogie Wonderland
2. Shining Star
3. That's the Way of the World
4. You And I
5. In the Stone
6. Got To Get You Into My Life

Side 3

1. Let's Groove
2. Jupiter
3. I've Had Enough
4. Be Ever Wonderful
5. Magic Mind
6. Saturday Nite

Side 4

1. After the Love Has Gone
2. Sing a Song
3. Love's Holiday/Brazilian Rhyme (Interlude)
4. Kalimba Tree/You Are a Winner
5. Back on the Road
6. Star

== Charts and certifications ==
=== Charts ===
Chart (1986)	Peak position
UK Pop Albums	5

=== Certifications ===
Region	Certification	Certified units/sales
United Kingdom (BPI)	Gold	100,000^{^}
^{^} Shipments figures based on certification alone.
