= The Greatest Hits (Earth, Wind & Fire album) =

Compilation album by Earth, Wind & Fire
- Released: 2010
- Genre: R&B
- Label: Columbia/Legacy
- Producer: Maurice White, Charles Stepney, Leo Sacks

Professional ratings
Review scores
Source	Rating
Allmusic	4/5 stars
BBC	(favourable)

The Greatest Hits is a compilation album by the band Earth, Wind & Fire issued in 2010 on Sony Music. The album reached No. 9 on the UK Albums and No. 29 on the Scottish Albums chart.

== Tracklisting ==
No.	Title	Writer(s)	Length
1.	"Let's Groove"	Wayne Vaughan, Maurice White	5:37
2.	"Boogie Wonderland"	Allee Willis	4:48
3.	"September"	Al McKay, Maurice White, Allee Willis	3:35
4.	"After the Love Has Gone"	Bill Champlin, David Foster, Jay Graydon	4:25
5.	"Fantasy"	Eduardo del Barrio, Maurice White, Verdine White	3:43
6.	"Star"	Eddie Del Barrio, Maurice White, Allee Willis	4:21
7.	"Saturday Nite"	Philip Bailey, Al McKay, Maurice White	4:03
8.	"Let Me Talk"	Philip Bailey, Larry Dunn, Ralph Johnson, Al McKay, Maurice White, Verdine White	4:07
9.	"I've Had Enough"	Philip Bailey, Jerry Hey, Billy Meyers, Brenda Russell	4:29
10.	"In the Stone"	David Foster, Maurice White, Allee Willis	4:26
11.	"Can't Let Go"	Bill Meyers, Maurice White, Allee Willis	3:29
12.	"Jupiter"	Philip Bailey, Maurice White, Verdine White	3:13
13.	"Got to Get You into My Life"	John Lennon, Paul McCartney	4:11
14.	"Shining Star"	Philip Bailey, Larry Dunn, Maurice White	2:52
15.	"Serpentine Fire"	Sonny Burke, Maurice White, Verdine White	3:52
16.	"That's the Way of the World"	Charles Stepney, Maurice White, Verdine White	5:45
17.	"Reasons"	Philip Bailey, Charles Stepney, Maurice White	5:01

== Certifications ==
Region	Certification	Certified units/sales
United Kingdom (BPI)	Gold	100,000^{‡}
^{‡} Sales+streaming figures based on certification alone.
