= The Very Best (Earth, Wind & Fire album) =

Compilation album by Earth, Wind & Fire
- Released: 1994
- Genre: R&B
- Label: Versailles Records
- Producer: Maurice White

Earth, Wind & Fire chronology
Millennium (1993)	The Very Best (1994)	Elements of Love: Ballads (1996)

The Very Best is a compilation album by American band Earth, Wind & Fire issued in 1994 on Versailles Records. The album was certified Double Gold in France by the SNEP.

== Track listing ==
No.	Title	Writer(s)	Length
1.	"Let's Groove"	Maurice White, Wayne Vaughn, Wanda Vaughn	5:39
2.	"Boogie Wonderland"	Jon Lind, Allee Willis	4:52
3.	"Fantasy"	Eduardo DelBarrio, Maurice White, Verdine White	3:47
4.	"September"	Al McKay, Maurice White, Allee Willis	3:36
5.	"Fall In Love With Me"	Maurice White, Wayne Vaughn, Wanda Vaughn	3:52
6.	"Shining Star"	Maurice White, Larry Dunn, Philip Bailey	2:51
7.	"Serpentine Fire"	Maurice White, Verdine White, Reginald "Sonny" Burke	3:49
8.	"Got to Get You Into My Life"	John Lennon, Paul McCartney	4:01
9.	"After The Love Has Gone"	David Foster, Bill Champlin, Jay Graydon	4:26
10.	"Reasons"	Maurice White, Charles Stepney, Philip Bailey	4:55
11.	"In The Stone"	Maurice White, Allee Willis, David Foster	4:46
12.	"Let Me Talk"	Maurice White, Verdine White, Ralph Johnson, Phillip Bailey, Larry Dunn, Al McKay,	3:59
13.	"Magnetic"	Martin Page	4:15
14.	"Getaway"	Beloyd Taylor, Peter Cor Belenky	3:42
15.	"I've Had Enough"	Philip Bailey, Greg Phillinganes, Brenda Russell	4:32
16.	"Thinking of You"	Maurice White, Wayne Vaughn, Wanda Vaughn	4:38
17.	"Heritage feat. The Boys"	Maurice White, Lestley Pierce and Frankie Blue	4:05
18.	"Megamix: September, Let's Groove, Rock That, Boogie Wonderland"		5:42

== Certifications ==
Region	Certification	Certified units/sales
France (SNEP)	2× Gold	200,000^{*}
^{*} Sales figures based on certification alone.
