= Elements of Love: Ballads =

Compilation album by Earth, Wind & Fire
- Released: June 11, 1996
- Genre: R&B
- Length: 1:06:47
- Label: Columbia
- Producers: Maurice White; Charles Stepney; Joseph Wissert; Leo Sacks

Earth, Wind & Fire chronology
Millennium (1993)	Elements of Love: Ballads (1996)	Boogie Wonderland: The Very Best of Earth, Wind & Fire (1996)

Professional ratings
Review scores
Source	Rating
Allmusic	4/5 stars
The Baltimore Sun	(favourable)

Elements of Love: Ballads is a compilation album by American band Earth, Wind & Fire, issued in June 1996 on Columbia Records. The album got to No. 24 on the Billboard Top R&B/Hip-Hop Catalog Albums chart.

== Critical reception ==
Allmusic called the album "a sparkling, 14-song compilation of ballads". J.D. Considine of The Baltimore Sun described the LP as "a collection emphasizing Earth, Wind & Fire's mellow side".

== Track listing ==
1. "Open Our Eyes" (Lumkins) – 5:06
2. "Keep Your Head to the Sky" (White) – 5:10
3. "Devotion" (Bailey, White) – 4:50
4. "Love's Holiday" (Scarborough, White) – 4:23
5. "Ponta de Areia (Brazilian Rhyme) (Interlude)" – (Brant, Nascimento) 0:53
6. "Be Ever Wonderful" (Dunn, White) – 5:08
7. "All About Love (First Impressions)" (Dunn, White) – 5:31
8. "Can't Hide Love" (Scarborough) – 4:09
9. "I'll Write a Song for You" (Bailey, Beckmeier, McKay) – 5:24
10. "After the Love Has Gone" (Champlin, Foster, Graydon) – 4:26
11. "Imagination" (Bailey, Stepney, White) – 5:15
12. "Side by Side" (Vaughn, White) – 5:32
13. "Spirit" (Dunn, White) – 3:12
14. "Reasons" (Live) (Bailey, Stepney, White) – 8:22
