= Live in Japan (Earth, Wind & Fire video) =

Video by Earth, Wind & Fire
- Released: 1998 (VHS), 2008 (DVD)
- Recorded: 1990
- Venue: Nippon Budokan
- Length: 1:16:26
- Label: Pioneer, Eagle Rock

Live in Japan is a concert by the band Earth, Wind & Fire released on DVD in 2008 by Eagle Rock Entertainment.

== Overview ==
Earth, Wind & Fire: Live in Japan was originally issued in 1998 on VHS by Pioneer Entertainment. The concert was recorded in the Tokyo Dome during the band's "Heritage Tour".

== Critical reception ==
The Urban Music Scene noted "it doesn't get any better than this folks" with Live in Japan. Mark Deming of Allmovie noted that EWF "show they still have talent and charisma to spare in this concert filmed in Japan in 1990". Matt Bauer of Exclaim! also called Live in Japan "mesmerizing".

== Track listing ==
No.	Title	Length
1.	"Intro"
2.	"System of Survival"
3.	"Getaway"
4.	"September"
5.	"Fantasy"
6.	"Shining Star"
7.	"Kalimba Tree"
8.	"After the Love Is Gone"
9.	"For the Love of You"
10.	"Reasons"
11.	"Brazilian Rhyme"
12.	"Let's Groove"
13.	"That's the Way of the World"

== Personnel ==
'Earth, Wind & Fire'

- Maurice White - kalimba, percussion, vocals
- Phillip Bailey - vocals, percussion
- Sheldon Reynolds - vocals, guitar
- Ralph Johnson - percussion, vocals
- Dick Smith - guitar, vocals
- Vance Taylor - keyboard
- Verdine White - bass
- Andrew Woolfolk - saxophone
- Sonny Emory - drums

Earth, Wind & Fire Horns

- Reggie Young - trombone
- Ray Brown - trumpet
- Gary Bias - saxophone
