= All 'n All =

Studio album by Earth, Wind & Fire
- Released: November 21, 1977
- Recorded: August 1977
- Studios: Hollywood Sound Recorders; The Burbank Studios; Sunset Sound
- Genres: R&B; soul; jazz; disco; funk; pop
- Length: 38:46
- Label: Columbia
- Producer: Maurice White

Earth, Wind & Fire chronology
Spirit (1976)	All 'n All (1977)	The Best of Earth, Wind & Fire, Vol. 1 (1978)

Singles from All 'n All
- 1. "Serpentine Fire" Released: October 15, 1977; 2. "Fantasy" Released: January 1978; 3. "Jupiter" Released: April 1978; 4. "Magic Mind" Released: July 1978

All 'n All is the eighth studio album by the American band Earth, Wind & Fire, released in November 1977 by Columbia Records. The album peaked at No. 1 on the US Billboard Top R&B/Hip-Hop Albums chart and No. 3 on the Billboard 200 chart.

All 'n All has also been certified Triple Platinum in the US by the RIAA, Gold in Canada by Music Canada and Silver in the UK by the BPI.

== Background ==
The gatefold of All 'n All

All 'n All was produced by Maurice White for Kalimba Productions. A month-long trip to Argentina and Brazil served as his main source of inspiration. All 'n All was also recorded at the Hollywood Sound Recorders and The Burbank Studios, both located in Los Angeles, California. A 1999 reissue of the album features two demos of "Love's Holiday" and "Runnin'" respectively, as well as a live rendition of "Brazilian Rhyme".

== Singles ==
"Serpentine Fire" reached number one on the Billboard Hot Soul Songs chart and number 13 on the Billboard Hot 100. Another single, "Fantasy", peaked at number 12 on the Billboard Hot Soul Songs chart and number 14 on the UK Pop Singles chart. "Fantasy" also earned a Grammy nomination for Best R&B Song.

== Critical reception ==
Professional ratings
Review scores
Source	Rating
AllMusic	4/5 stars
New Musical Express	(favourable)
Record Mirror	4/5 stars
The Village Voice	B+

Joe McEwen of Rolling Stone opined, "As on past Earth, Wind and Fire records, All 'n All is filled with leaded brotherhood platitudes, Star Trek sci-fi and stiffly poetic love songs. This sounds overwrought and depressing (and maybe it is). But there's a catch: I like the record, for like much current black music, All 'n All elicits a schizophrenic response. If the album represents some of the worst in black music, it also has more than its share of the best." The Los Angeles Times said that "All n All includes only two ballads and for a change both are as nifty as the R&B rockers. Possibly EW&F's finest collection."

Robert Christgau of The Village Voice, in a B+ review, remarked, "Focusing soulful horns, high-tension harmonies, and rhythms and textures from many lands onto a first side that cooks throughout. Only one element is lacking. Still, unsympathetic as I am to lyrics about conquering the universe on wings of thought, they make me shake my fundament anyway." Within a 4/5 stars review, Barry Cain of Record Mirror hailed the album, saying, "the spirit of Maurice White reigns supreme... the singer, writer, and producer casts his giant bird like shadow across every note, every peerless piece of slickery, every eye - blinking device. If anyone can claim to be the Fellini of funk, it's Maurice White" ... "It's an EW&F album and I like it. Unashamedly."

Phyl Garland of Stereo Review noted that "the music is delightfully earthy in its appeal, an aural collage of rich vocal and instrumental textures underscored by highly danceable rhythms that never surrender to triteness. Though the very name of this group partakes of astrological symbolism, and though the lyrics of their songs often hint of galactic mysteries, the nine men who compose Earth, Wind & Fire play a kind of music that might be called neo-progressive soul, for it is a full light-year beyond what most groups are doing these days, soaring to celestial heights while sending out waves of mundane thrills." John Rockwell of The New York Times said, "All 'n All shows Maurice White and his cohorts pushing their music ever more in a febrile jazz-rock direction. There are parallels, here, to white rock groups like Queen and Yes, but the very sophistication and single-mindedness of Earth, Wind and Fire's vision sets it apart from the bulk of rock-and-roll." Monroe Anderson of the Chicago Tribune wrote that "the soul group's latest album release, All 'N All (Columbia), is a rare blend of poetry, passion, and artistic progression...All 'N All is a nice indication that EW&F is trying to expose its fans to other forms of American music and take them across international and cultural borders."

A retrospective review by The Guardian lauded the album, saying, "Maurice White began his career as a drummer, and his band can sound like one enormous kit, where every crash and beat has its funky place... the whole shebang is punctuated beautifully by Milton Nascimento's 'Brazilian Rhyme'." Alex Henderson of AllMusic commented, "Earth, Wind & Fire's artistic and commercial winning streak continued with its ninth album, All 'n All... (the diverse jewel) was a highly rewarding addition to EWF's catalog."

All 'n All won a Grammy for Best R&B Vocal Performance by a Duo, Group or Chorus. The track "Runnin'" won a Grammy for Best R&B Instrumental. All 'n All was also nominated for an American Music Award in the category of Favorite Soul/R&B Album.

=== Accolades ===
Publication	Country	Accolade	Year	Rank
Dave Marsh and Kevin Stein	U.S.	The 40 Best of Album Chartmakers by Year	1981	13
Tom Moon	U.S.	1,000 Recordings to Hear Before You Die	2008	*
The Guardian	U.K.	1,000 Albums to Hear Before You Die	2007	*

(*) designates lists that are unordered.

== Track listing ==
=== Original release ===
Side one
No.	Title	Writer(s)	Length
1.	"Serpentine Fire"	Maurice White; Verdine White; Reginald "Sonny" Burke	3:51
2.	"Fantasy"	M. White; V. White; Eduardo Del Barrio	4:38
3.	"In the Marketplace (Interlude)"	M. White	0:43
4.	"Jupiter"	M. White; V. White; Larry Dunn; Philip Bailey	3:12
5.	"Love's Holiday"	M. White; Skip Scarborough	4:23
6.	"Brazilian Rhyme (Beijo)"	M. White	1:20

Side two
No.	Title	Writer(s)	Length
1.	"I'll Write a Song for You"	Philip Bailey; Al McKay; Steve Beckmeier	5:23
2.	"Magic Mind"	Larry Dunn; Bailey; McKay; Maurice White; Verdine White; Fred White	3:38
3.	"Runnin'"	M. White; Dunn; Eduardo del Barrio	5:50
4.	"Brazilian Rhyme (Ponta de Areia)"	Milton Nascimento	0:53
5.	"Be Ever Wonderful"	M. White; Dunn	5:08

=== 1999 reissue ===
1999 reissue
No.	Title	Writer(s)	Length
1.	"Serpentine Fire"	Reginald "Sonny" Burke; M. White; V. White	3:51
2.	"Fantasy"	M. White; V. White; Del Barrio	4:38
3.	"In the Marketplace (Interlude)"	M. White	0:43
4.	"Jupiter"	Bailey; Dunn; M. White; V. White	3:11
5.	"September"	McKay; M. White; Allee Willis	3:36
6.	"Love's Holiday"	Skip Scarborough; M. White	4:22
7.	"Brazilian Rhyme (Beijo)"	M. White	1:20
8.	"Got to Get You into My Life"	John Lennon; Paul McCartney	4:03
9.	"I'll Write a Song for You"	Bailey; McKay; Beckmeier	5:23
10.	"Magic Mind"	Bailey; Dunn; McKay; M. White; V. White; Fred White	3:38
11.	"Runnin'"	Del Barrio; M. White; Dunn	5:50
12.	"Brazilian Rhyme (Ponta de Areia)"	Nascimento	0:53
13.	"Be Ever Wonderful"	M. White; Dunn	5:07
14.	"Would You Mind"	Scarborough; M. White	2:21
15.	"Runnin' (Original Hollywood Mix)"	Del Barrio; M. White; Dunn	3:19
16.	"Brazilian Rhyme (Beijo) (Recorded Live)"	M. White	2:32
Total length:			58:25

== Personnel ==
Adapted from the liner notes.

- Dorothy Ashby – harp
- Phil Ayling – flute
- Philip Bailey – vocals, percussion, congas
- Blanche Belnick – violin
- Roger Bobo – tuba
- George Bohanon – trombone
- Oscar Brashear – trumpet
- Garnett Brown – trombone
- Ronald Clark – violin
- Ronald Cooper – cello
- Paulinho Da Costa – percussion
- Eduardo del Barrio – piano
- Eumir Deodato – horn arrangement, string arrangement (7, 10)
- Warren Dewey – additional recording engineer
- David Duke – French horn
- Larry Dunn – assistant producer, piano, Moog synthesizer, Oberheim synthesizer
- Chuck Findley – trumpet
- Norman Forrest – viola
- Harris Goldman – violin
- Jack Gootkin – violin
- Janice Gower – violin, concertmaster
- Johnny Graham – guitar solo (5), additional guitars
- Terry Harrington – flute
- Michael Harris – trumpet solo (9), additional trumpets
- Ruth Henry – violin
- Fred Jackson Jr. – flute
- Ralph Johnson – drums
- Jan Kelly – cello
- Richard Klein – French horn
- Paul Klingberg – audio mixing (12–14)
- Renita Koven – viola
- Betty LaMagna – violin
- Carl LaMagna – violin
- Mary D. Lindquist – violin
- Linda Lipsett – viola
- Art Macnow – direction
- Steve Madaio – trumpet
- Cameron Marcarelli – mixing assistant (12–14)
- George Massenburg – recording engineer
- James M. McGee – French horn
- Al McKay – guitar solo (9), additional guitars
- Abe Most – flute
- Don Myrick – saxophone solo (9), alto saxophone, tenor saxophone, baritone saxophone
- Susan Ranney – acoustic bass
- Alan Robinson – French horn
- Gale Robinson – French horn
- Marilyn Robinson – French horn
- Jack Rouben – assistant recording engineer
- Meyer Rubin – acoustic bass
- Leo Sacks – audio mixing (12–14), reissue producer
- Richard Salvato – direction
- Sheldon Sanov – violin
- Louis Satterfield – trombone
- Skip Scarborough – piano
- Haim Shtrum – violin
- Daniel Smith – cello
- Barry Socher – violin
- Lya Stern – violin
- David Stockhammer – violin
- Barbara Thomason – viola
- Tom Tom 84 – horn arrangement, string arrangement
- Marcia Van Dyke – violin
- Fred White – drums
- Maurice White – audio mixing (12–14), original recording producer, vocals, drums, kalimba
- Verdine White – assistant producer, vocals, electric bass
- Mark Wilder – mastering
- Andrew Woolfolk – tenor saxophone

== Charts ==
=== Weekly charts ===
Year	Chart	Peak position
1977	US Top LPs & Tape (Billboard)	3
1977	US Top Soul LPs (Billboard)	1
1977	Canada Top Albums (RPM)	3
1977	Dutch Albums (Dutch Charts)	4
1977	New Zealand Pop Albums	12
1977	Swedish Albums (Sverigetopplistan)	11
1977	UK Pop Albums	13
1977	Japanese Albums (Oricon)	14

=== Year-end charts ===
Year	Chart	Peak position
1978	US Billboard 200	12
1978	US Top Soul Albums (Billboard)	1
1978	Dutch Albums (Dutch Charts)	12
1978	Japanese Albums (Oricon)	31

=== Singles ===
Year	Single	Peak positions			
Year	Single	US Hot 100	US R&B	US Dance	UK Pop Singles
1977	"Serpentine Fire"	13	1	–	–
1978	"Fantasy"	32	12	–	14
1978	"Jupiter"	–	–	–	41
1978	"Magic Mind"	–	–	–	54

== Certifications ==
Certifications for All 'n All
Region	Certification	Certified units/sales
Canada (Music Canada)	Gold	50,000^{^}
Japan	—	127,340
Netherlands (NVPI)	Gold	50,000^{^}
United Kingdom (BPI)	Silver	60,000^{^}
United States (RIAA)	3× Platinum	3,000,000^{^}
^{^} Shipments figures based on certification alone.

== See also ==
- List of Billboard number-one R&B albums of 1977
- List of Billboard number-one R&B albums of 1978
