= Shining Stars: The Official Story Of Earth, Wind & Fire =

2001 film by Kathryn Arnold

Shining Stars: The Official Story of Earth, Wind, & Fire
- Promotional poster
- Directed by: Kathryn Arnold
- Produced by: Stephanie Bennett
- Starring: Philip Bailey, Larry Dunn, Johnny Graham, Ralph Johnson, Al McKay, Fred White, Maurice White, Verdine White, Andrew Woolfolk
- Edited by: Lina Macri; Josh Muscatine
- Distributed by: Eagle Rock Entertainment
- Release date: August 21, 2001
- Running time: 120 minutes
- Country: United States
- Language: English

Shining Stars: The Official Story of Earth, Wind & Fire is a 2001 film biography of the band Earth, Wind & Fire. It was released on August 21, 2001, and was directed by Kathryn Arnold and produced by Stephanie Bennett. It was made with the band's input and has both concert footage and interviews with the members of the group.
