= Millennium (Earth, Wind & Fire album) =

Studio album by Earth, Wind & Fire
- Released: September 14, 1993
- Recorded: 1992–1993
- Studios: Sonic Lab, Capitol Studios and Andora Studios (Hollywood, California); Devonshire Sound Studios, Larrabee Sound Studios and Pacifique Studios (North Hollywood, California)
- Genres: R&B; new jack swing; funk; Minneapolis sound
- Length: 63:55
- Label: Reprise Records
- Producers: Maurice White; Freddie Ravel; Frankie Blue; Bill Meyers

Earth, Wind & Fire chronology
The Very Best of Earth, Wind & Fire (1992)	Millennium (1993)	The Very Best (1994)

Singles from Heritage
- 1. "Spend The Night" Released: 1993; 2. "Sunday Morning" Released: 1993; 3. "Two Hearts" Released: 1993

Millennium is the sixteenth studio album by American band Earth, Wind & Fire released in September 1993 on Warner Bros. Records. The album reached No. 8 on the US Billboard Top R&B Albums chart, No. 39 on the US Billboard 200, No. 18 on the Japanese Pop Albums chart and No. 29 on the Dutch Album Top 100. Millennium has also been certified Gold in Japan by the RIAJ.

== Overview ==
Millennium marked the band's return after 21 years to Warner Bros. Records. The album was also produced by EWF's founder and leader Maurice White.

Artists such as Prince and Ronnie Laws appeared on the LP.

== Critical reception ==
Professional ratings
Review scores
Source	Rating
AllMusic	2/5 stars
Associated Press	(favourable)
Boston Globe	(favourable)
Buffalo News	4/5 stars
Orlando Sentinel	3/5 stars
Dayton Daily News	3.5/4 stars
Detroit Free Press	(favourable)
The Independent	(favourable)
Los Angeles Times	2/4 stars
Morning Call	(favourable)
USA Today	3/4 stars

Within 4/5 stars review the Buffalo News commented "EW&F, one of the few groups that kept black popular music alive when disco ruled, has poured new life into a proven musical formula. Its latest project contains a plethora of kalimbas, blaring horns, and converging Afro-Cuban and Latin rhythms. Add the stratospheric voices of EW&F founder Maurice White, and star-lead vocalist Philip Bailey, and behold: a revamped re-creation of the message-laden, massaging tunes the band was known for in its heyday." Steven Wine of the Associated Press claimed "Millennium is EWF's best record since their artsistic peak in the 1970s, when such albums as Gratitude and That's the Way of the World deftly mixed R&B, funk and jazz." Tom Sinclair of Vibe found EWF "demonstrate they still have the knack for constructing mellifluous R&B on the visonary/romantic tip".

Paul Willistein of The Morning Call wrote "There are more than half a dozen standouts among the disc's 16 tracks, making this a must have for longtime fans." Renee Graham of The Boston Globe noted that Millennium "returns the band to its funk/r&b roots". With a three out of four star rating James T. Jones IV of USA Today found that the band "returned to their trademark sound: snappy horns, kalimba (thumb piano), falsetto harmonies, Afro-Cuban influences, instrumental interludes and philosophical lyrics." Derek Ali of the Dayton Daily News in a 3.5/5 stars review said, "With its Millennium album, Earth, Wind & Fire proves its one of those rare groups that can maintain a musical style for several decades while keeping pace with today's sounds". Gary Graff of the Detroit Free Press wrote "EWF returns to the joyous R&B that made it famous, landing smooth if not exactly landmark results." Andy Gill of The Independent stated "if it's an old-style R&B sensibility you're after, the new Earth, Wind & Fire album may be just the ticket."

The Buffalo News placed the album on its list of the best R&B/Hip-Hop albums of 1993. Millennium was also nominated for a Soul Train Music Award within the category of Best R&B/Soul Album - Group, Band or Duo.

== Singles ==
The track "Sunday Morning", earned a Grammy nomination for Best R&B Vocal Performance by a Duo or Group. Released as a single, it peaked at No. 10 on the Billboard Adult R&B Songs chart, No. 20 on the Hot R&B Singles chart and No. 35 on the Adult Contemporary chart.

The album cut "Spend the Night" reached Nos. 36 and 42 on the Billboard Adult R&B Songs and Hot R&B/Hip-Hop Songs charts, respectively.

== Covers ==
The Prince-penned track, "Super Hero", was covered by the New Power Generation featuring the Steeles for the soundtrack to the film Blankman.

== Track listing ==
No.	Title	Writer(s)	Length
1.	"Even If You Wonder"	Nicky Brown, Jeffrey Cohen, Jon Lind, Maurice White	4:38
2.	"Sunday Morning"	Sheldon Reynolds, Maurice White, Allee Willis	4:39
3.	"Blood Brothers"	Nicky Brown, Jon Lind, Brock Walsh, Maurice White	5:23
4.	"Kalimba Interlude"	Maurice White	0:31
5.	"Spend The Night"	Dawn Thomas	4:24
6.	"Divine"	Philip Bailey, Ken Barken, Roxanne Seeman	4:33
7.	"Two Hearts"	Burt Bacharach, Philip Bailey, Maurice White	5:06
8.	"Honor The Magic"	Freddie Ravel, Maurice White	3:05
9.	"Love Is The Greatest Story"	Faye Freenberg, David Lawrence, Maurice White	4:38
10.	"The "L" Word""	Nicky Brown, Jon Lind, Maurice White, Allee Willis	4:34
11.	"Just Another Lonely Night"	Linda Stokes, Michael Stokes	4:38
12.	"Super Hero"	Prince	4:10
13.	"Wouldn't Change A Thing About You"	Philip Bailey, Frankie Blue	4:47
14.	"Love Across The Wire"	Philip Bailey, Thom Bell, Maurice White	3:34
15.	"Chicago (Chi-Town) Blues"	Nicky Brown, Jon Lind, Brock Walsh, Maurice White	4:58
16.	"Kalimba Blues"	Maurice White	0:35

== Personnel ==
Earth, Wind & Fire

- Philip Bailey – backing vocals (1–3, 5–7, 9–15), lead vocals (3, 6, 7, 11, 13, 14), vocals (8, 12)
- Maurice White – kalimba, percussion, lead vocals (1–3, 5–7, 9–15), backing vocals (1–3, 5–7, 9–15), drum programming (2), vocals (8, 12)
- Sheldon Reynolds – keyboards, guitars, backing vocals (1–3, 5–7, 9–15), synth bass (1, 2), rhythm programming (1, 3, 5, 9, 13, 15), keyboard programming (2), synthesizer programming (2), drum programming (2, 10), additional programming (12), synthesizers (15)
- Verdine White – bass guitar
- Ralph Johnson – percussion
- Andrew Woolfolk – saxophones
- Gary Bias – saxophones
- Reggie C. Young – trombone
- Ray Brown – trumpet

Additional musicians

- Nicky Brown – keyboards (1, 10), synthesizers (3, 15)
- Michael McKnight – synthesizer programming (1–3, 5–7, 9–15), rhythm programming (1, 3, 9, 15), keyboard programming (2), keyboards (7), synth bass (7, 14), drum programming (7, 14), synthesizers (15)
- Bill Meyers – keyboards (4, 16), acoustic piano (5), synthesizers (5, 11, 12, 15), rhythm programming (5), acoustic piano solo (13), synth bass (15)
- Freddie Ravel – synthesizers (5, 8), breath synthesizer solo (5, 8), drums (8), percussion sound design (8)
- Don Wyatt – keyboards (6, 11, 14), synth bass (11)
- Darnell Spencer – synthesizer programming (6), synth bass (6), drum programming (6)
- Rex Salas – keyboards (7), synthesizer programming (7), synth bass (7), drum programming (7)
- Burt Bacharach – additional keyboards (7)
- Claude Gaudette – additional keyboards (7)
- David Lawrence – keyboards (9), rhythm programming (9)
- Prince – keyboards (12), drum programming (12), backing vocals (12)
- Frankie Blue – synthesizers (13), synthesizer programming (13), rhythm programming (13)
- Brad Cole – synthesizers (13)
- Thom Bell – keyboards (14)
- Michael Thompson – guitars (1, 2, 5, 12, 14)
- Jorge Strunz – acoustic guitar (8)
- Dimitric Collins – drum programming (11, 14)
- James "Timbali" Cornwell – percussion (1, 9)
- Paulinho da Costa – percussion (2, 3, 5, 10, 13, 15), additional percussion (8)
- Dan Higgins – saxophones (1, 9, 12)
- Gerald Albright – saxophones (5, 7)
- Larry Williams – saxophones (12)
- Ronnie Laws – sax solo (15)
- Bill Reichenbach Jr. – trombone (1, 9, 12)
- Gary Grant – trumpet (1, 9, 12)
- Jerry Hey – trumpet (1, 9, 12)
- Michael "Patches" Stewart – trumpet (2, 3, 5, 10, 13, 15)

Music arrangements

- Jerry Hey – horn arrangements (1, 9)
- Tom "Tom Tom 84" Washington – horn arrangements (2, 13), string arrangements (3)
- Bill Meyers – string arrangements (5), horn arrangements (5, 10, 12, 15), synth horn and synth string arrangements (11)
- Freddie Ravel – synthesizer arrangements (5), arrangements (8)
- Darnell Spencer – rhythm arrangements (6)
- Maurice White – synth horn arrangements (6, 7), arrangements (8, 14), horn arrangements (12)
- Michael McKnight – synth horn arrangements (7), arrangements (14)
- Rex Salas – rhythm arrangements (7)
- Nicky Brown – rhythm arrangements (10)
- Prince – rhythm arrangements (12)

Strings (tracks 3 & 5)

- Bruce Dukov – concertmaster
- Larry Corbett, Steve Erdody and Suzie Katayama – cello
- Bob Becker, Roland Kato and Herschel Wise – viola
- Ron Clark, Bruce Dukov, Henry Ferber, Armen Garabedian, Berj Garabedian, Endre Granat, Clayton Haslop, Peter Kent, Dimitrie Leivici, Sid Page, Barbra Porter and Haim Shtrum – violin

=== Production ===
- Maurice White – producer (1–14, 16)
- Freddie Ravel – producer (8)
- Frankie Blue – producer (13)
- Bill Meyers – producer (15)
- Paul Klingberg – recording
- Guy DeFazio – additional engineer
- Ray Blair – assistant engineer
- Mark Fergesen – assistant engineer
- Judy Kirschner – assistant engineer
- Keith Kresge – assistant engineer
- Terry Reiff – assistant engineer
- Lee Watters – assistant engineer
- Mick Guzauski – mixing (1–3, 5, 7, 9–11, 13–15)
- Vachik Aghanisntz – mixing (4, 8, 16)
- Keith Cohen – mixing (6, 12)
- Jeff Graham – mix assistant (1–3, 5, 7, 9–11, 13–15)
- Anas Allaf – mix assistant (4, 8, 16)
- Tommy Daugherty – mix assistant (6, 12)
- Steve Hall – mastering at Future Disc (Hollywood, California)
- Art Macnow – project supervisor
- Richard Salvato – album coordinator
- Reiko Yoshida – artwork coordinator
- Kim Champagne – art direction
- Tadanori Yokoo – illustration
- Terushia Tajima – computer supervisor
- Bob Cavallo – management

== Charts ==
Album
Year	Chart	Position
1993	U.S. Billboard 200	39
1993	U.S. Billboard Top R&B Albums	8
1993	Japanese Pop Albums (Oricon)	18
1993	Dutch Albums (Dutch Album Top 100)	29
1993	Sweden Albums (Sverigetopplistan)	50

Singles
Year	Single	Chart	Position
1993	"Spend the Night"	Japanese Pop Singles (Oricon)	33
1993	"Spend the Night"	U.S. Billboard Adult R&B Airplay	36
1993	"Spend the Night"	U.S. Billboard Hot R&B Singles	42
1993	"Sunday Morning"	U.S. Billboard Hot R&B Singles	20
1993	"Sunday Morning"	U.S. Billboard Rhythmic Top 40	31
1993	"Sunday Morning"	U.S. Billboard Adult Contemporary Songs	35
1993	"Sunday Morning"	U.S. Billboard Adult R&B Songs	10
1993	"Sunday Morning"	Canada RPM Top Singles	33
1993	"Sunday Morning"	Dutch Singles (Dutch Single Top 100)	26
1993	"Sunday Morning"	Japanese Pop Singles (Oricon)	2
1993	"Sunday Morning"	U.S. Billboard Mainstream Top 40	34
1993	"Sunday Morning"	U.S. Billboard Hot 100	53
1993	"Blood Brothers"	Japanese Pop Singles (Oricon)	53
1993	"Two Hearts"	U.S. Billboard Hot R&B Singles	88

== Certifications ==
Region	Certification	Certified units/sales
Japan (RIAJ)	Gold	100,000^{^}
^{^} Shipments figures based on certification alone.
