= Gratitude (Earth, Wind & Fire album) =

Live album by Earth, Wind & Fire
- Released: November 11, 1975
- Studios: Atlanta, Georgia (Live Concert); Boston, Massachusetts (Live Concert); Chicago, Illinois (Live Concert); Hollywood Sound Recorders, Inc.; Hollywood, California (Live Concert); New York City, New York (Live Concert); Philadelphia, Pennsylvania (Live Concert); St. Louis, Missouri (Live Concert); Wally Heider Recording Studio, Los Angeles, CA; Washington, D.C. (Live Concert)
- Genres: R&B; funk; soul; jazz-funk
- Length: 66:22
- Label: Columbia/Legacy
- Producers: Maurice White; Charles Stepney; Joe Wissert (Live shows)

Earth, Wind & Fire chronology
That's the Way of the World (1975)	Gratitude (1975)	Spirit (1976)

Singles from Gratitude
- 1. "Sing a Song" Released: November 1975; 2. "Can't Hide Love" Released: March 1976

Gratitude is a double live album by American band Earth, Wind & Fire, issued in November 1975 by Columbia Records. The album spent six weeks atop the Billboard Top Soul Albums chart and three weeks atop the Billboard 200 chart. Gratitude has also been certified Triple Platinum in the US by the RIAA.

== Overview ==
Co-produced by Maurice White and Charles Stepney, Gratitude consists mostly of live tracks together with some newly recorded songs. A 1999 reissue features two interludes together with a live medley of "Serpentine Fire", "Saturday Nite", "Can't Hide Love", and "Reasons". This medley was recorded on February 11, 1978, via CBS, at Natalie Cole's live TV variety special.

== Singles ==
With the LP came "Sing a Song" which rose to No. 1 on the Billboard Hot Soul Songs chart and No. 5 on the Hot 100 chart. Another single, "Can't Hide Love", got to No. 11 on the Billboard Hot Soul Songs chart. "Can't Hide Love" was also nominated for a Grammy in the category of Best Arrangement For Voices.

== Critical reception ==
Professional ratings
Review scores
Source	Rating
AllMusic	4.5/5 stars
Village Voice	(B)
The Rolling Stone Album Guide	5/5 stars
Spin	(favorable)
NME	(favorable)
DownBeat	3/5 stars
New York Times	(favorable)
Uncut	4/5 stars
Chicago Tribune	(favorable)
Pittsburgh Post-Gazette	(favorable)

Within a 4/5 stars review Kit Aiken of Uncut called Gratitude "a kicking live album". Mikal Gilmore of DownBeat in a 3/5 stars review, exclaimed "Earth, Wind and Fire is the penultimate second generation band of the Sly Stone/Stevie Wonder school of funk. Their arrangements and vocals derive largely from Stevie and Sly’s mannerisms, and, similarly, their appeal cuts across all racial, radio, and disco barriers. While they have yet to carve any totally innovative niche for themselves in the musical pantheon, they certainly have provided enough clues to their possible future directions to insure their malleability. In short, EW&F is more interesting than nine-tenths of the current soul-jazz-rock-disco bands, and their musicianship clearly matches their flash. Although a live album was a slightly premature issue on their part, the band needed a release to coincide with the distribution of the film That's The Way Of The World. Gratitude is excellent filler, and EW&F is not above trading in a bit of their overnight mythology to advance their own profile." Henry Edwards of The New York Times declared, "All of the music is carefully tooled, zestfully polished, relentlessly good-natured rhythmic dance music, an amalgam of rhythm‐and‐blues, jazz and middle-of-the-road pop that the group gleefully shouts, croons, squeals and growls. There's showmanship galore here, but strip that showmanship away and one discovers that Earth, Wind & Fire's music is built around one persistently repeated chord‐and not the world's most interesting chord either." Will Smith of the Omaha World-Herald scribed "Gratitude by Earth, Wind & Fire has the soul that so many so-called soul groups lack. The nine-man group manages to keep the interest level high on this two-record set with the inclusion of jazz tinges." Alex Henderson of AllMusic, in a 4.5/5 stars review found "Gratitude brilliantly captures the excitement EWF generated on-stage at its creative peak... one of EWF's finest accomplishments."

Cliff White of NME called Gratitude "Proof at last that EWF deserve all the acclaim that's been heaped on them in the last couple of years. Their previous albums were impressive... but never quite capturing the full spirit of the group as envisaged by leader Maurice White. A little too much technique perhaps, and not quite enough soul. Now we get to hear them at their very best and it's suddenly apparent that they knock most other "progressive" black groups into a cocked hat." Mike Kalina of the Pittsburgh Post-Gazette claimed Gratitude "features a variety of superb rhythm and blues material with plenty of jazz overtones. The group's lyrics may not be the most innovative but they all fit perfectly into the patchwork of funk the group weaves. The musicianship of the group cannot be beat nor can the feeling that this group - my favorite in the R&B idiom - puts out." Tony Green of Spin exclaimed "A frightfully accomplished funk hit machine flexing its muscles live is truly a beautiful thing. And few had as much flex-worthy musical mass as these crossover kings. (EW&F) melded proto-Afrocentricism with self help optimism, filling out their sound with Jazz leanings and swelling summer breeze ballads. An album that's capable at any moment of landing an emotional killer blow." Greg Kot of the Chicago Tribune found "an Ellingtonian fusion of styles on this live masterpiece."

EWF went on to win a Rock Music Award in the category of Best Soul Album for Gratitude. The album's title track was also Grammy nominated in the category of Best R&B Performance by a Duo or Group with Vocals.

=== Accolades ===
Publication	Country	Accolade	Year	Rank
Various writers	United States	Albums: 50 Years of Great Recordings		*
Rickey Vincent	United States	Five Star Albums from "Funk: The Music, The People, and The Rhythm of The One"		*
National Association of Recording Merchandisers and The Rock and Roll Hall of Fame	United States	The Definitive 200	2007	141
New Book of Rock Lists	United States	The 50 Best Number One Albums (1955–93)	1994	*
* denotes an unranked list

== Track listing ==
=== Original release ===
Side one
No.	Title	Writer(s)	Length
1.	"Introduction by MC Perry Jones"	Perry Jones	0:21
2.	"Africano/Power"	Larry Dunn; Maurice White	5:56
3.	"Yearnin' Learnin'"	Philip Bailey; Charles Stepney; White	4:16
4.	"Devotion"	Bailey; White	5:07

Side two
No.	Title	Writer(s)	Length
5.	"Sun Goddess"	Jon Lind; White	7:41
6.	"Reasons"	Bailey; Stepney; White	8:23
7.	"Sing a Message to You"	White	1:19

Side three
No.	Title	Writer(s)	Length
8.	"Shining Star"	Bailey; White; Dunn	4:55
9.	"New World Symphony"	White; Verdine White	9:28
10.	"Sunshine"	White; Bailey; Dunn; Al McKay	4:24

Side four
No.	Title	Writer(s)	Length
11.	"Sing a Song"	McKay; White	3:23
12.	"Gratitude"	Bailey; White; Dunn; V. White	3:23
13.	"Celebrate"	Bailey; Stepney; White	3:06
14.	"Can't Hide Love"	Skip Scarborough	4:10
Total length:			66:22

Note

- Tracks 10–14 indicate studio recordings.

=== 1999 Legacy reissue ===
Legacy CK 65737
No.	Title	Writer(s)	Length
1.	"Introduction by MC Perry Jones"	Jones	0:21
2.	"Africano/Power"	Dunn; White	5:56
3.	"Yearnin' Learnin'"	Bailey; Stepney; White	4:16
4.	"Devotion"	Bailey; White	5:07
5.	"Sun Goddess"	Lind; White	7:41
6.	"Reasons"	Bailey; Stepney; White	8:23
7.	"Sing a Message to You"	White	1:19
8.	"Shining Star"	Bailey; White; Dunn	4:55
9.	"New World Symphony"	White; V. White	9:28
10.	"Musical Interlude #1"		0:15
11.	"Sunshine"	White; Bailey; Dunn; McKay	4:24
12.	"Sing a Song"	McKay; White	3:23
13.	"Gratitude"	Bailey; White; Dunn; V. White	3:23
14.	"Celebrate"	Bailey; Stepney; White	3:06
15.	"Musical Interlude #2"		0:27
16.	"Can't Hide Love"	Scarborough	4:10
17.	"Live Bonus Medley: Serpentine Fire / Saturday Nite / Can't Hide Love / Reasons"	Reginald "Sonny" Burke; V. White; White; McKay; Bailey; Scarborough; Stepney	6:13

Note

- "Live Bonus Medley" recorded live on February 11, 1978, at Hollywood Sunset Sound Recorders in Hollywood, California for a 1978 TV Variety Special starring Natalie Cole.

== Personnel ==
=== Musicians ===
- Philip Bailey – vocals, congas, percussion
- Larry Dunn – organ, piano, Moog synthesizer
- Johnny Graham – guitar
- Michael Harris – trumpet
- Ralph Johnson – drums, percussion
- Perry Jones – talking voice on track 1
- Al McKay – guitar, percussion
- Don Myrick – saxophone
- Louis Satterfield – trombone
- Fred White – drums, percussion
- Maurice White – vocals, drums, timbales, kalimba, percussion
- Verdine White – vocals, bass guitar, percussion
- Andrew Woolfolk – percussion, saxophone

=== Production ===
- Earth, Wind & Fire – arrangers (all tracks)
- Maurice White – audio mixing, remix producer on track 17, original recording producer, original album producer
- Joe Wissert – producer (original recording – live tracks), original album producer
- Charles Stepney – arranger (studio tracks), producer (original recording – studio tracks), original album producer
- Leo Sacks – producer (reissue), audio mixing on track 17
- Joy Gilbert – project director
- Richard Salvato – director, direction
- Art Macnow – direction
- Howard Fritzson – art direction
- Steve Hall – mastering
- Mark Wilder – mastering
- Paul Klingberg – remix producer, audio mixing on track 17
- George Massenburg – recording engineer (all tracks), mixing
- Cameron Marcarelli – assistant engineer, mixing assistant on track 17
- Shusei Nagaoka – artwork
- Steve Newman – design
- David Redfern - photography, inlay photography
- Michael Cimicata – packaging manager

== Charts and certifications ==
=== Weekly charts ===
Chart (1976)	Peak position
Canadian Albums (RPM)	37
Japanese Albums (Oricon)	58
US Billboard 200	1
US Top R&B/Hip-Hop Albums (Billboard)	1

=== Year-end charts ===
Chart (1976)	Position
US Billboard 200	10
US Top R&B/Hip-Hop Albums (Billboard)	2

=== Singles ===
Year	Single	Chart	Position
1976	"Can't Hide Love"	Black Singles	11
1976	"Can't Hide Love"	Pop Singles	39
1976	"Sing a Song/Gratitude"	Club Play Singles	1
1976	"Sing a Song"	Black Singles	1
1976	"Sing a Song"	Pop Singles	5

=== Certifications ===
Country	Award
US (RIAA)	Triple Platinum

== See also ==
- List of Billboard 200 number-one albums of 1976
- List of Billboard number-one R&B albums of 1976
