= The Very Best of Earth, Wind & Fire =

Greatest hits album by Earth, Wind & Fire
- Released: November 1992
- Genre: R&B
- Label: Telstar Records
- Producer: Maurice White

Earth, Wind & Fire chronology
| The Eternal Dance (1992) | The Very Best of Earth, Wind & Fire (1992) | Millennium (1993) |

Alternative cover
- Boogie Wonderland reissue

The Very Best of Earth, Wind & Fire is a compilation album by American band Earth, Wind & Fire released in 1992 on Telstar Records. The album peaked at No. 40 on the UK Albums Chart. It was reissued in 1996 as Boogie Wonderland: The Very Best of Earth, Wind & Fire, reaching No. 29 on that same chart.

== Overview ==
British soul singer Gabrielle listed The Very Best of Earth, Wind & Fire at No. 18 on a list of her top 20 albums of all time.

== Track listing ==
| No. | Title | Writer(s) | Length |
|---|---|---|---|
| 1. | "Boogie Wonderland" | Jon Lind, Allee Willis | 4:52 |
| 2. | "Let's Groove" | Wayne Vaughn, Maurice White | 5:39 |
| 3. | "September" | Al McKay, Maurice White, Allee Willis | 3:36 |
| 4. | "Fantasy" | Eduardo DelBarrio, Maurice White, Verdine White | 3:47 |
| 5. | "Got to Get You into My Life" | John Lennon, Paul McCartney | 4:05 |
| 6. | "Saturday Nite" | Maurice White, Phillip Bailey, Al McKay | 4:05 |
| 7. | "In the Stone" | Maurice White, Allee Willis, David Foster | 3:32 |
| 8. | "Mighty Mighty" | Maurice White, Verdine White | 3:05 |
| 9. | "I've Had Enough" | Philip Bailey, Greg Phillinganes, Brenda Russell | 3:51 |
| 10. | "Love's Holiday" | Skip Scarborough, Maurice White | 4:26 |
| 11. | "Star" | Eddie Del Barrio, Maurice White, Allee Willis | 4:26 |
| 12. | "Reasons" | Philip Bailey, Charles Stepney, Maurice White | 4:58 |
| 13. | "Getaway" | Peter Cor, Beloyd Taylor | 3:47 |
| 14. | "System of Survival" | Skylark | 4:26 |
| 15. | "Spread Your Love" | Azar Lawrence, Beloyd Taylor, Maurice White | 3:53 |
| 16. | "Let Me Talk" | Maurice White; Verdine White; Al McKay; Philip Bailey; Larry Dunn; Ralph Johnson | 3:57 |
| 17. | "After the Love Has Gone" | David Foster, Jay Graydon, Bill Champlin | 4:34 |
| 18. | "Let Your Feelings Show" | Maurice White, Allee Willis, David Foster | 5:19 |

== Charts ==
| Year | Chart | Position |
|---|---|---|
| 1992 | UK Albums Chart | 40 |
