= Skip Scarborough =

American songwriter (1944–2003)

- Born: Clarence Alexander Scarborough; November 26, 1944; Baton Rouge, Louisiana, United States
- Origin: Baton Rouge, Louisiana
- Died: July 3, 2003 (aged 58) Los Angeles, California, United States
- Genres: R&B, funk, soul, disco
- Occupations: Songwriter, arranger, record producer
- Instrument: Keyboards
- Years active: 1960s–2003
- Formerly of: L.T.D., Earth, Wind & Fire, The Emotions, Creative Source, Anita Baker, Con Funk Shun

Clarence Alexander "Skip" Scarborough (November 26, 1944 – July 3, 2003) was an American songwriter, best known for romantic ballads.

== Biography ==
Scarborough was born in Baton Rouge, Louisiana. He lived in Los Angeles most of his life.

A prolific songwriter, Scarborough wrote songs performed by L.T.D., Anita Baker and Earth, Wind & Fire. He co-wrote "Giving You the Best That I Got", which won a Grammy Award in 1988 for Best R&B Song.

Scarborough was a cousin of fellow songwriter and producer Gary Taylor.

Scarborough died of cancer on July 3, 2003 in Los Angeles.

Scarborough is survived by his wife, Alton, of Alton McClain & Destiny, daughters Relana and Candace, son Marc, as well as a host of grandchildren, nieces and nephews.

== Credits ==
- 1970
  - "Love or Let Me Be Lonely" (Friends of Distinction)
- 1973
  - "Love Can Make It Easier" (The Dells, Friends of Distinction)
  - "Stand Up and Show the World" (The Dells)
  - "You Can't Hide Love" (Creative Source)
  - "The World's a Masquerade" (Earth, Wind & Fire)
- 1976
  - "Can't Hide Love", (Earth, Wind & Fire, Carmen McRae, Hummingbird, Dionne Warwick, D'Angelo)
  - "Earth, Wind & Fire" (Earth, Wind & Fire)
  - "Love Ballad" (LTD)
- 1977
  - "Don't Ask My Neighbors" (The Emotions)
  - "Lovely Day" (Bill Withers)
  - "Love's Holiday" (Earth, Wind & Fire)
  - "No One Can Love you More" (Phyllis Hyman)
- 1978
  - "Love Changes" (Mother's Finest)
  - "Love Music" (Earth, Wind & Fire)
  - "Walking the Line" (The Emotions)
- 1979
  - "It's Alright with Me" (Patti LaBelle)
  - "Love Ballad" (George Benson)
- 1982
  - "Love Notes" (Deniece Williams)
- 1983
  - "They Say" (Deniece Williams) & (Phillip Bailey)
- 1988
  - "Giving You the Best That I Got" (Anita Baker)
- 1990
  - "Don't Ask My Neighbors" (Nancy Wilson)
- 1992
  - "Sacrifice of Praise" (Edwin Hawkins)
- 1995
  - "Feel the Funk" (IMx)
