= Sing a Song (Earth, Wind & Fire song) =

Single by Earth, Wind & Fire

from the album Gratitude
- B-side: "Sing a Song (Instrumental)"
- Released: November 1975
- Recorded: 1975
- Genre: R&B; soul; funk; disco
- Length: 3:26
- Label: Columbia
- Songwriters: Maurice White, Al McKay
- Producers: Maurice White, Charles Stepney

Earth, Wind & Fire singles chronology
"That's the Way of the World" (1975)	"Sing a Song" (1975)	"Can't Hide Love" (1976)

Music video
- "Sing a Song" on YouTube

"Sing a Song" is a song recorded by R&B/funk band, Earth, Wind & Fire, which was issued as a single in November 1975 on Columbia Records. The song reached No. 1 on the Billboard Hot Soul Singles chart and No. 5 on the Billboard Hot 100.

== Overview ==
"Sing a Song" spent two weeks atop the Billboard Hot Soul Songs chart. The song was composed by Maurice White with Al McKay and produced by White and Charles Stepney. An instrumental version of Sing a Song was the b-side of the single. Sing a Song also came off the band's 1975 album, Gratitude.

== Critical reception ==
Alex Henderson of AllMusic called Gratitude "uplifting." Record World said that "With vocal parlays reminiscent of early Sly & the Family Stone and a horn section that is as tight as Chicago's, the group should soon be back on top.'" Cliff White of NME exclaimed "Particularly good is a hybrid from Curtis Mayfield's Impressions and The Blackbyrds called "Sing A Song".

== Samples and covers ==
"Sing a Song" was covered by the gospel group Point of Grace on their 1996 album, Life Love & Other Mysteries and jazz guitarist Richard Smith on his 2003 album SOuLIDIFIED. Take 6 also covered the song on their 1996 album, Brothers.

"Sing a Song" was sampled by Beyoncé on the track "Hey Goldmember" from the soundtrack to the 2002 feature film Austin Powers in Goldmember.

== Appearances in other media ==
"Sing a Song" appeared on the soundtrack to the 2000 feature film The Color of Friendship. The song was also featured on the soundtrack to the 2003 feature film Something's Gotta Give.

== Chart history ==
Chart (1975–1976)	Peak position
US Billboard Hot Soul Singles	1
US Billboard Hot 100	5
Belgian Singles (Ultratop 50 Singles)	24
Canada RPM Top Singles	13
Dutch Singles (Dutch Single Top 100)	19

=== Certifications ===
Region	Certification	Certified units/sales
United States (RIAA)	Gold	1,000,000^{^}
^{^} Shipments figures based on certification alone.

== See also ==
- List of number-one R&B singles of 1976 (U.S.)
