= You Can't Hide Love =

1973 single by Creative Source

Single by Creative Source

from the album Creative Source
- B-side: "Lovesville"
- Released: 1973
- Recorded: 1973
- Genre: R&B
- Length: 3:22
- Label: Sussex
- Songwriter: Skip Scarborough
- Producer: Michael Stokes

Creative Source singles chronology
"You Can't Hide Love" (1973)	"You're Too Good To Be True" (1973)

"You Can't Hide Love" is a single by soul group Creative Source released in 1973 on Sussex Records. The song reached No. 48 on the Billboard Hot R&B Singles chart.

== Overview ==
"You Can't Hide Love" was produced by Michael Stokes and composed by Skip Scarborough. The single's B-side was "Lovesville". Both songs came from Creative Source's 1973 self-titled debut studio album.

== Charts ==
Chart (1973)	Peak position
U.S. Billboard Hot Soul Singles	48

== Earth, Wind & Fire version ==
"Can't Hide Love"

Single by Earth, Wind & Fire

from the album Gratitude
- B-side: "Gratitude"
- Released: 1976
- Recorded: 1975
- Genre: R&B, funk
- Label: Columbia
- Songwriter: Skip Scarborough
- Producers: Maurice White, Charles Stepney

Earth, Wind & Fire singles chronology
"Sing a Song" (1975)	"Can't Hide Love" (1976)	"Getaway" (1976)

Earth, Wind & Fire covered the song under the title of Can't Hide Love. This tune was released as a single in 1976 by Columbia Records and reached No. 11 on the US Billboard Hot Soul Songs chart and No. 39 on the US Billboard Hot 100 chart.

=== Overview ===
EWF's version was produced by Maurice White and Charles Stepney. The single's B-side was "Gratitude." Both studio recordings came from the band's 1975 live album Gratitude.

=== Critical reception ===
Record World said that it achieves "just the right mix of vocal harmonies." Within his review of Gratitude Alex Henderson of Allmusic called Can't Hide Love "haunting".

Jason Elias of Allmusic wrote in his review of the song "While on the face this seems like a well-meaning plea, "Can't Hide Love" is filled with teasing, taunts, and a sense of bitterness that gives the song its emotional weight. Maurice White's insinuating lead was great enough, and near the end of the song Phillip Bailey does some great vocal runs. Bailey's riffs near the fade became the rite of passage for all fledging high tenor/falsettos."

=== Accolades ===
"Can't Hide Love" was Grammy nominated in the category of Best Instrumental Arrangement Accompanying Vocalist(s).

During 2008 Prince gave a live performance of "Can't Hide Love" on stage at the Hotel Gansevoort in Manhattan, New York.

=== Samples ===
EWF's rendition was sampled by Raheem DeVaughn on the song "Guess Who Loves You More" from his 2005 album The Love Experience. Along with Drake on his 2009 tune Beautiful Life and Rick Ross on the song Capone Suite from the soundtrack of the 2018 feature film Superfly.

As well the song was sampled by Lucky Daye feat. EW&F on his song “You Want My Love”. What's more, Can't Hide Love was interpolated by rapper Prodigy and duo Silk Sonic.

=== Covers ===
The artists who have covered "You Can't Hide Love" include Victor Wooten, Nancy Wilson, Saul Williams and Wayman Tisdale, as well as Najee, Jaye P. Morgan, Dionne Warwick, John Tropea, Kenny Thomas, Bobby Tench with Hummingbird and Carmen McRae and D'Angelo.

=== Charts ===
Chart (1976)	Peak position
U.S. Billboard Hot 100	39
U.S. Billboard Hot Soul Singles	11
