= That's the Way of the World (Earth, Wind & Fire song) =

Single by Earth, Wind & Fire

from the album That's the Way of the World
- B-side: "Africano"
- Released: June 17, 1975
- Recorded: Autumn 1974
- Genre: R&B; soul; funk
- Length: 3:12 (single version); 5:45 (album version)
- Label: Columbia
- Songwriters: Maurice White; Charles Stepney; Verdine White
- Producer: Maurice White

Earth, Wind & Fire singles chronology
"Sun Goddess" (1975)	"That's the Way of the World" (1975)	"Sing a Song" (1975)

"That's the Way of the World" is a song recorded by the band Earth, Wind & Fire, released as a single in June 1975 on Columbia Records. The song reached No. 5 on the Billboard Hot Soul Singles chart and No. 12 on the Billboard Hot 100.

== Overview ==
The song is the title track of Earth, Wind & Fire's 1975 album of the same name. The track was produced by bandleader Maurice White, who also wrote the song along with Charles Stepney and Verdine White.

== Critical reception ==
Cash Box said that it was "clean, mindbending and soulful." George Chesterton of The Guardian said that the song is "touched with the epic, which emerges as the scope of its message of hope and soulful majesty unfold." Alex Henderson of Allmusic called the song "unforgettable". Stephen Curwood of the Boston Globe wrote "The title cut comes into your consciousness the way a cool air-conditioned breeze rushes over your face when you've been out in the sticky heat. Sometimes the cool goes too dry for our taste, but then, that's a form of sophistication." Daryl Easlea of the BBC also said "That's the Way of the World" "remains irresistible: six minutes of ethereal, bossa nova-influenced soul."

== Chart history ==
Chart (1975)	Peak position
Canada RPM Top Singles	20
U.S. Billboard Hot 100	12
U.S. Billboard Hot Soul Singles	5

== Accolades ==
Publication	Country	Accolade	Year	Rank
Rolling Stone	U.S.	The 500 Greatest Songs of All Time	2004	329
Bruce Pollock	U.S.	The 7,500 Most Important Songs of 1944–2000	2005	*
Mark Ellingham	U.S.	The Rough Guide Book of Playlists: 5,000 Songs You Must Download	2007	*

(*) designates lists that are unordered.

== Covers and samples ==
Soul artist Dwele covered of "That's the Way of the World" on the 2007 compilation album Interpretations: Celebrating the Music of Earth, Wind & Fire. With his rendition of the song, Dwele earned a nomination for the Grammy Award for Best Urban/Alternative Performance at the 50th Annual Grammy Awards. The song has also been sampled by artists Nas, BeBe & CeCe Winans and Cam'ron.
