= Andrew Woolfolk =

American saxophonist (1950–2022)

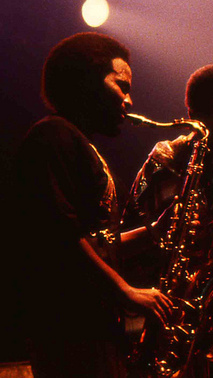
- Woolfolk with Earth, Wind & Fire in 1982

Background information
- Born: Andrew Paul Woolfolk II; October 11, 1950; San Antonio, Texas, U.S.
- Died: April 24, 2022 (aged 71) Aurora, Colorado, U.S.
- Genres: Soul; R&B; disco; gospel; dance; pop
- Occupation: Saxophonist
- Instruments: Saxophone; flute; percussion
- Years active: 1973–2022
- Formerly of: Earth, Wind & Fire

Andrew Paul Woolfolk II (October 11, 1950 – April 24, 2022) was an American saxophonist. Woolfolk was a longtime member of the band Earth, Wind & Fire from 1973 to 1985, and from 1987 to 1993. He also collaborated with artists such as Deniece Williams, Stanley Turrentine, Phil Collins, Twennynine, Philip Bailey, and Level 42.

== Biography ==
Woolfolk attended East High School in Denver, Colorado. In 1972 he joined the band Earth, Wind & Fire as a saxophonist and became a longstanding member. Woolfolk was inducted into the Rock and Roll Hall of Fame as a member of Earth, Wind & Fire in 2000. In 2017, Woolfolk was inducted into the Colorado Music Hall of Fame.

Woolfolk died on April 24, 2022, after a long illness.

== Collaborations ==
Aside from his work with EW&F, Woolfolk played the saxophone on Valerie Carter's 1977 album Just a Stone's Throw Away, Deniece Williams' 1977 LP Song Bird, Twennynine's 1979 album Best of Friends, and Stanley Turrentine's 1981 LP Tender Togetherness.

He later performed on Level 42's 1983 album Standing in the Light, Philip Bailey's 1984 Grammy-nominated LP The Wonders of His Love, and Bailey's 1986 Grammy-winning album Triumph.

Woolfolk also played the saxophone on Tracie Spencer's 1988 self titled album and on Phil Collins' 1996 album Dance Into the Light.
