= Shining Star (Earth, Wind & Fire song) =

Single by Earth, Wind & Fire

from the album That's the Way of the World
- B-side: "Yearnin' Learnin'"
- Released: January 21, 1975
- Recorded: Autumn 1974
- Genre: Progressive soul; funk; disco
- Length: 2:50
- Label: Columbia
- Songwriters: Maurice White; Larry Dunn; Philip Bailey
- Producers: Maurice White; Charles Stepney

Earth, Wind & Fire singles chronology
"Hot Dawgit" (1974)	"Shining Star" (1975)	"Sun Goddess" (1975)

"Shining Star" is a song by American band Earth, Wind & Fire from the album That's the Way of the World, issued as a single in January 1975 on Columbia Records. The song rose to No. 1 on both the Billboard Hot 100 chart and the Billboard Hot Soul Songs chart, becoming their first single to top both charts (and only single to top the former). It has also been certified gold in the US by the RIAA.

== Overview ==
"Shining Star" was produced by Maurice White and composed by White, Larry Dunn and Philip Bailey.

The concept for the song came to Maurice White while strolling at night during the band's recording of That's the Way of the World at Caribou Ranch. He became inspired by looking up at the starry sky and took his ideas about the song to the other band members.

== Critical reception ==
Vibe called "Shining Star" a "treasure". Alex Henderson of AllMusic described the song as "sweaty funk". Gordon Fletcher of Rolling Stone wrote that the song "glow(s) with an incendiary charge that once moved record producer Sandy Pearlman to term EW&F 'the closest thing to a black heavy-metal band'." Daryl Easlea of the BBC found that "'Shining Star' can be seen as much an influence on Prince as anything by James Brown". Stephen Curwood of The Boston Globe noted that the tune "shows off the fabulous range and coordination of this nine-man vocal ensemble and instrumental choir.

"Shining Star" also won a Grammy Award for Best R&B Performance by a Duo or Group with Vocals at the 18th Annual Grammy Awards. In 2008, the song was inducted into the Grammy Hall of Fame.

== Covers and samples ==
The song has been sampled by hip hop artists MC Lyte, Snoop Dogg and Salt-N-Pepa among many other artists. It has also been interpolated in songs by hip-hop groups the Roots and De La Soul.

== Personnel ==
- Maurice White – lead and backing vocals
- Phillip Bailey – lead and backing vocals, congas
- Verdine White – bass, backing vocals
- Ralph Johnson – percussion, drums
- Al McKay – lead guitar
- Johnny Graham – rhythm guitar
- Fred White – drums
- Larry Dunn – clavinet
- Andrew P. Woolfolk – soprano saxophone, tenor saxophone
- George Bohanon – trombone
- Oscar Brashear – trumpet
- Ernie Watts – additional saxophone

== Chart positions ==
Chart (1975–1976)	Peak position
U.S. Billboard Hot 100	1
U.S. Billboard Hot Soul Singles	1
Dutch Singles (Dutch Charts)	14

== Certifications ==
Region	Certification	Certified units/sales
United States (RIAA)	Gold	1,000,000^{^}
^{^} Shipments figures based on certification alone.

== Accolades ==
Publication	Country	Accolade	Year	Rank
Pause & Play	U.S.	Songs Inducted into a Time Capsule, One Album per Week	2008	*
The Recording Academy	U.S.	Grammy Hall of Fame	2008	*
Dave Marsh	U.S.	The 1001 Greatest Singles Ever Made	1989	433
Bruce Pollock	U.S.	The 7,500 Most Important Songs of 1944-2000	2005	*

(*) designates lists that are unordered.
