= Gold (Earth, Wind & Fire album) =

Compilation album by Earth, Wind & Fire
- Released: 2020
- Genre: R&B
- Label: Crimson Recordings
- Producer: Maurice White, Charles Stepney, Leo Sacks

Earth, Wind & Fire chronology
The Classic Christmas Album (2015)	Gold (2020)

Gold is a compilation album by the band Earth, Wind & Fire issued in 2020 through the Crimson Label. The album reached No. 20 on the Scottish Albums chart.

== Track listing ==
Disc 1
No.	Title	Writer(s)	Length
1.	"Boogie Wonderland"	Allee Willis, Jon Lind	4:49
2.	"Let's Groove"	Maurice White, Wayne Vaughn	3:59
3.	"Shining Star"	Philip Bailey, Maurice White, Larry Dunn	2:50
4.	"That's the Way of the World"	Maurice White, Charles Stepney, Verdine White	3:12
5.	"Sing a Song"	Maurice White, Charles Stepney	3:26
6.	"Can't Hide Love"	Skip Scarborough	3:22
7.	"Getaway"	Bernard "Beloyd" Taylor, Peter Cor Belenky	3:47
8.	"Gratitude"	Philip Bailey, Maurice White, Larry Dunn, Verdine White	3:23
9.	"Love's Holiday"	Maurice White, Skip Scarborough	4:23
10.	"Reasons"	Philip Bailey, Charles Stepney, Maurice White	4:59
11.	"Runnin'"	Maurice White, Larry Dunn, Eddie del Barrio	5:50
12.	"Mom"	Maurice White, Verdine White	3:44
13.	"Evil"	Maurice White, Philip Bailey	3:09
14.	"Keep Your Head to the Sky"	Maurice White	3:25
15.	"Mighty Mighty"	Maurice White, Verdine White	3:01
16.	"Kalimba Story"	Joe Wissert, Maurice White	2:58
17.	"Devotion"	Maurice White, Philip Bailey	3:30

Disc 2
No.	Title	Writer(s)	Length
1.	"September"	Al McKay, Maurice White, Allee Willis	3:35
2.	"After the Love Has Gone"	David Foster, Jay Graydon, Bill Champlin	3:55
3.	"Let Your Feelings Show"	Maurice White, Allee Willis, David Foster	4:36
4.	"Jupiter"	Maurice White, Verdine White, Larry Dunn, Phillip Bailey	3:11
5.	"Magic Mind"	Larry Dunn, Philip Bailey, Al McKay, Maurice White, Verdine White, Fred White	3:38
6.	"Star"	Allee Willis, Eduardo Del Barrio and Maurice White	3:40
7.	"Can't Let Go"	Bill Myers, Maurice White, Allee Willis	3:28
8.	"Let Me Talk"	Maurice White, Ralph Johnson, Phillip Bailey, Larry Dunn, Al McKay, Verdine White	3:28
9.	"Side by Side"	Wayne Vaughn, Wanda Vaughn, Maurice White	4:09
10.	"Spread Your Love"	Azar Lawrence, Beloyd Taylor, Maurice White	3:51
11.	"Magnetic"	Martin Page	3:45
12.	"Touch"	Jon Lind, Martin Page	4:54
13.	"System of Survival"	Skylark	4:08
14.	"Thinking of You"	Wayne Vaughn, Wanda Vaughn, Maurice White	3:54
15.	"Let's Groove" (special remixed holiday version)	Wanda Vaughn, Maurice White	6:43

Disc 3
No.	Title	Writer(s)	Length
1.	"Got to Get You into My Life"	John Lennon, Paul McCartney	4:03
2.	"Fantasy"	Maurice White, Verdine White, Eddie del Barrio	3:46
3.	"Saturday Nite"	Maurice White, Al McKay, Philip Bailey	3:42
4.	"Serpentine Fire"	Maurice White, Verdine White, Reginald "Sonny" Burke	3:50
5.	"On Your Face"	Charles Stepney, Maurice White, Philip Bailey	4:34
6.	"You"	David Foster, Brenda Russell, Maurice White	3:56
7.	"And Love Goes On"	David Foster, Larry Dunn, Brenda Russell, Verdine White, Maurice White	3:38
8.	"Back on the Road"	Al McKay, Maurice White	3:33
9.	"Wanna Be with You"	Maurice White, Wayne Vaughn	3:55
10.	"I've Had Enough"	Philip Bailey, Greg Phillinganes, Brenda Russell	4:36
11.	"Fall in Love with Me"	Wayne Vaughn, Wanda Vaughn, Maurice White	3:54
12.	"In the Stone"	Allee Willis, David Foster and Maurice White	4:48
13.	"Boogie Wonderland" (with the Emotions; special disco version)	Al McKay, Maurice White	4:49
