= The Essential Earth, Wind & Fire =

Greatest hits album by Earth, Wind & Fire
- Released: July 30, 2002
- Recorded: 1973–1983
- Genre: R&B; pop-soul
- Label: Columbia/Legacy
- Producer: Maurice White, Al McKay, Charles Stepney, Joseph Wissert, Leo Sacks

Earth, Wind & Fire chronology
That's the Way of the World: Alive in 75 (2002)	The Essential Earth, Wind & Fire (2002)	Live in Rio (2002)

The Essential Earth, Wind & Fire is a compilation album by American band Earth, Wind & Fire issued in July 2002 by Columbia/Legacy. It has been certified Gold in the US by the RIAA.

== Overview ==
With the LP came a sampler which featured remixes of Can't Hide Love and Let's Groove. During October 2002, the remix sampler was issued as a single and got to No. 4 on the UK Dance Singles Chart.

== Critical reception ==
Professional ratings
Review scores
Source	Rating
AllMusic	4.5/5 stars
Blender	4/5 stars
PopMatters	(favourable)
Newsday	(favourable)
SoulTracks	(favourable)

Mark Anthony Neal of PopMatters proclaimed: "The Essential Earth, Wind, and Fire, chronicles the best music of arguably the most popular R&B/soul band of the last three decades." Barry Walters of Blender, who gave the collection a four out of five star rating, opined: "the 34 tracks on The Essential encompass these funky spiritualists’ many sides, from preachy (“All About Love”) to sensual (“Can’t Hide Love”) to ecstatic (“Boogie Wonderland”)." With a 4.5 out of 5 star rating, Stephen Thomas Erlewine of Allmusic wrote: "The single-disc Greatest Hits remains the choice for the casual and the curious listener due to its concise concentration of classics, but anybody who wants a thorough retrospective should choose this." Howard Dukes of SoulTracks called the album "a collection that will definitely get the party started".

== Track listing ==
Disc 1
No.	Title	Writer(s)	Originally from	Length
1.	"Mighty Mighty"	Maurice White, Verdine White	Open Our Eyes, 1974	3:02
2.	"Evil"	M. White	Head to the Sky, 1973	4:56
3.	"Devotion"	Philip Bailey, M. White	Open Our Eyes	4:49
4.	"Keep Your Head to the Sky"	M. White	Head to the Sky	5:09
5.	"Kalimba Story"	M. White, V. White	Open Our Eyes	4:01
6.	"Shining Star"	Bailey, Larry Dunn, M. White	That's the Way of the World, 1975	2:50
7.	"That's the Way of the World"	Charles Stepney, M. White, V. White	That's the Way of the World	5:45
8.	"Yearnin' Learnin'"	Bailey, Stepney, M. White	That's the Way of the World	3:39
9.	"All About Love"	Dunn, M. White	That's the Way of the World	5:30
10.	"Reasons"	Bailey, Stepney, M. White	That's the Way of the World	4:58
11.	"Sing a Song"	Al McKay, M. White	Gratitude, 1975	3:23
12.	"Can't Hide Love"	Skip Scarborough	Gratitude	4:09
13.	"Getaway"	Peter Cor, Beloyd Taylor	Spirit, 1976	3:45
14.	"Saturday Nite"	Bailey, McKay, M. White	Spirit	4:03
15.	"Ponta de Areia (Brazilian Rhyme)/Be Ever Wonderful"	Dunn, Milton Nascimento, M. White	All 'n All, 1977	6:00
16.	"Open Our Eyes"	Leon Lumkins	Open Our Eyes	5:03
17.	"Got to Get You into My Life"	John Lennon, Paul McCartney	Sgt. Pepper's Lonely Hearts Club Band, 1978	4:03

Disc 2
No.	Title	Writer(s)	Originally from	Length
1.	"September"	McKay, M. White, Allee Willis	The Best of Earth, Wind & Fire, Vol. 1	3:35
2.	"Serpentine Fire"	Sonny Burke, M. White, V. White	All 'n All	3:50
3.	"Fantasy"	Eduardo DelBarrio, M. White, V. White	All 'n All	4:36
4.	"I'll Write a Song for You"	Bailey, Steve Beckmeier, McKay	All 'n All	5:22
5.	"Drum Song"	M. White	Open Our Eyes	5:09
6.	"In the Stone"	M. White, David Foster, Willis	I Am, 1979	4:25
7.	"Can't Let Go"	Bill Myers, M. White, Willis	I Am	3:28
8.	"After the Love Has Gone"	Bill Champlin, David Foster, Jay Graydon	I Am	4:25
9.	"Wait"	Foster, M. White, Willis	I Am	3:39
10.	"You and I"	Foster, M. White, Willis	I Am	3:31
11.	"Let Me Talk"	Bailey, Dunn, Ralph Johnson, McKay, M. White, V. White	Faces, 1980	4:08
12.	"And Love Goes On"	Dunn, Foster, Brenda Russell, M. White, V. White	Faces	4:04
13.	"You"	Foster, Russell, M. White	Faces	5:30
14.	"Let's Groove"	Wayne Vaughn, M. White	Raise!, 1981	5:32
15.	"Fall In Love With Me"	Wanda Vaughn, Wayne Vaughn, M. White	Powerlight, 1983	5:49
16.	"Side by Side"	Wayne Vaughn, M. White	Powerlight	5:31
17.	"Boogie Wonderland" (with The Emotions)	Jon Lind, Willis	I Am	4:48

Disc 3 - from Limited Edition 3.0 (2008)
No.	Title	Writer(s)	Originally from	Length
1.	"Sun Goddess"	M. White, Lind	Gratitude	7:41
2.	"Celebrate"	M. White, Bailey, Stepney	Gratitude	3:06
3.	"Spirit"	M. White, Dunn	Spirit	3:12
4.	"On Your Face"	M. White, Stepney, Bailey	Spirit	4:33
5.	"Imagination"	M. White, Stepney, Bailey	Spirit	5:16
6.	"Runnin'"	M. White, Dunn, del Barrio	All 'n All	5:51
7.	"Jupiter"	M. White, V. White, Dunn, Bailey	All 'n All	3:11
8.	"System of Survival"	"Skylark"	Touch the World	5:01

=== 2014 reissue ===
Disc 1
No.	Title	Writer(s)	Originally from	Length
1.	"Mighty Mighty"	M. White, V. White	Open Our Eyes	3:03
2.	"Devotion"	Bailey, M. White	Open Our Eyes	4:50
3.	"Keep Your Head to the Sky"	M. White	Head to the Sky	5:10
4.	"Kalimba Story"	M. White, V. White	Open Our Eyes	4:02
5.	"Shining Star"	Bailey, Dunn, M. White	That's the Way of the World	2:50
6.	"That's the Way of the World"	Stepney, M. White, V. White	That's the Way of the World	5:47
7.	"Reasons"	Bailey, Stepney, M. White	That's the Way of the World	4:59
8.	"Sing a Song"	McKay, M. White	Gratitude	3:24
9.	"Can't Hide Love"	Scarborough	Gratitude	4:11
10.	"Getaway"	Cor, Taylor	Spirit	3:45
11.	"On Your Face"	Bailey, Stepney, M. White	Spirit	4:34
12.	"Saturday Nite"	Bailey, McKay, M. White	Spirit	4:01
13.	"Got to Get You into My Life"	Lennon, McCartney	Sgt. Pepper's Lonely Hearts Club Band	4:03
14.	"September"	McKay, M. White, Willis	The Best of Earth, Wind & Fire, Vol. 1	3:35
15.	"Serpentine Fire"	Burke, M. White, V. White	All 'n All	3:51
16.	"Fantasy"	DelBarrio, M. White, V. White	All 'n All	4:38
17.	"I'll Write a Song for You"	Bailey, Beckmeier, McKay	All 'n All	5:24
18.	"Drum Song"	M. White	Open Our Eyes	5:09

Disc 2
No.	Title	Writer(s)	Originally from	Length
1.	"Boogie Wonderland" (with The Emotions)	Lind, Willis	I Am	4:49
2.	"In the Stone"	M. White, Foster, Willis	I Am	4:25
3.	"Can't Let Go"	Myers, M. White, Willis	I Am	3:29
4.	"After the Love Has Gone"	Champlin, Foster, Graydon	I Am	4:39
5.	"You and I"	Foster, M. White, Willis	I Am	3:33
6.	"Let Me Talk"	Bailey, Dunn, Johnson, McKay, M. White, V. White	Faces	4:08
7.	"And Love Goes On"	Dunn, Foster, Russell, M. White, V. White	Faces	4:05
8.	"You"	Foster, Russell, M. White	Faces	5:31
9.	"Let's Groove"	Wayne Vaughn, M. White	Raise!	5:39
10.	"Fall in Love with Me"	Wanda Vaughn, Wayne Vaughn, M. White	Powerlight	5:52
11.	"Magnetic"	Martin Page	Electric Universe, 1983	4:22
12.	"Dance Dance Dance"	Taylor, M. White	Rock & Rule soundtrack, 1986; released as a digital single in 2012	3:13
13.	"System of Survival"	"Skylark"	Touch the World, 1987	5:00
14.	"Sunday Morning (Radio Mix)"	Sheldon Reynolds, M. White, Willis	Millennium, 1993	4:12
15.	"Pure Gold"	Bobby Avila, Issiah Avila, Tony Tolbert, James Harris III, Terry Lewis	Illumination, 2005	4:41
16.	"The Way You Move"	Patrick Brown, Carlton Mahone, Antwan Patton	Illumination	4:17
17.	"My Promise"	Siedah Garrett, Austin Jacobs, Darrin Simpson	Now, Then & Forever, 2013	3:22

== Personnel ==
- Maurice White – vocals, kalimba, timbales, drums, producer, compilation producer
- Verdine White – vocals, bass, percussion
- Philip Bailey – vocals, congas, percussion
- Larry Dunn – piano, organ, synthesizer, programming
- Ken Yerke – violin
- Harris Goldman – violin
- Rollice Dale – viola
- Dennis Karmazyn – cello
- Harry Schultz – cello
- Fred Jackson Jr. – saxophone
- Herman Riley – saxophone
- Jerome Richardson – saxophone
- Tommy Johnson – tuba
- Harvey Mason – percussion
- Paulinho Da Costa – percussion
- Beloyd Taylor – background vocals
- Joe Wissert – producer
- Charles Stepney – producer
- Al McKay – producer
- Leo Sacks – compilation producer

== Accolades ==
The following accolades attributed to The Essential Earth, Wind & Fire.

Publication	Country	Accolade	Year	Rank
Blender	U.S.	500 CDs You Must Own: Rhythm & Blues	2003	Alphabetical order
