= Love Songs (Earth, Wind & Fire album) =

Compilation album by Earth, Wind & Fire
- Released: January 13, 2004
- Recorded: 1973–1981
- Genre: R&B
- Label: Columbia/Legacy
- Producers: Maurice White, Charles Stepney, Leo Sacks

Earth, Wind & Fire chronology
The Promise (2003)	Love Songs (2004)	Illumination (2005)

Professional ratings
Review scores
Source	Rating
Allmusic	4/5 stars
Baltimore Sun	(favourable)

Love Songs is a compilation album by American band Earth, Wind & Fire. It was released on January 13, 2004 by Columbia/Legacy.

== Critical reception ==
Thom Jurek of Allmusic praised this album saying, "The 14 tracks here are the proof in the pudding that while with Columbia, E,W&F created a body of seductive, sophisticated, warm, bubbling soul that moved their body/mind continuum in a singular fashion from 1975 to 1983."

== Track listing ==
No.	Title	Writer(s)	Length
1.	"Reasons"	Philip Bailey, Charles Stepney, Maurice White	4:59
2.	"Can't Hide Love"	Skip Scarborough	4:09
3.	"Love's Holiday"	Skip Scarborough, Maurice White	4:22
4.	"Be Ever Wonderful"	Larry Dunn, Maurice White	5:07
5.	"Beijo (Interlude)"	Maurice White	1:20
6.	"I'll Write a Song for You"	Philip Bailey, Beckmeier, Al McKay	5:22
7.	"You"	David Foster, Brenda Russell, Maurice White	5:30
8.	"Fantasy"	Eddie Del Barrio, Maurice White, Verdine White	4:36
9.	"Earth, Wind and Fire"	Skip Scarborough, Maurice White	4:40
10.	"Fall in Love with Me"	Wayne Vaughn, Wanda Vaughn, Maurice White	5:49
11.	"Side by Side"	Wayne Vaughn, Maurice White	5:31
12.	"Wait"	David Foster, Maurice White, Allee Willis	3:39
13.	"After the Love Has Gone"	Bill Champlin, David Foster, Jay Graydon	4:25
14.	"Wanna Be With You"	Wayne Vaughn, Maurice White	4:35
