= The Collection (Earth, Wind & Fire video) =

Video by Earth, Wind & Fire
- Released: February 15, 2005
- Genre: R&B
- Length: 1 hr 15 mins
- Label: Sony Music

Earth, Wind & Fire chronology
Earth, Wind & Fire: Live At Montreux 1997 (2004)	The Collection (2005)	Chicago/Earth, Wind & Fire - Live at the Greek Theatre (2005)

The Collection is a DVD released by the band Earth, Wind & Fire on February 15, 2005 on Sony Music. The DVD consists of music videos and live performances of some of the band's songs.

== Track listing ==
No.	Title	Length
1.	"Serpentine Fire"
2.	"Boogie Wonderland (with The Emotions)"
3.	"September"
4.	"Let Me Talk"
5.	"Let's Groove"
6.	"Magnetic"
7.	"Fall in Love with Me"
8.	"System of Survival"
9.	"Thinking of You"
10.	"Evil Roy"
11.	"Heritage"
12.	"September '99 (Phats & Small Remix)"
13.	"Fantasy (Live)"
14.	"Reasons (Live)"
15.	"Sing a Song (Live)"
16.	"I've Had Enough (Live)"
17.	"After the Love Has Gone (Live)"

== Charts ==
Chart (2005)	Peak position
NL Dutch Charts	14
