= Earth, Wind & Fire: Live at Montreux 1997 =

Video by Earth, Wind & Fire
- Released: November 2004
- Length: 106:00
- Label: Eagle Rock Entertainment, Eagle Eye Media
- Producer: Montreux Sounds

Earth, Wind & Fire chronology
Earth, Wind & Fire: Live by Request (2002)	Earth, Wind & Fire: Live at Montreux 1997 (2004)	The Collection (2005)

Earth, Wind & Fire: Live at Montreux 1997 is a DVD by the band Earth, Wind & Fire which was issued in November 2004 by Eagle Rock Entertainment. This DVD has also been certified Gold in the US by the RIAA.

== Overview ==
The DVD showcases the band's performance during both the 1997 and 1998 editions of the Montreux Jazz Festival.

== Critical reception ==
The Other Chad of Blogcritics hailed the DVD saying "Earth, Wind & Fire: Live at Montreux 1997 has been reissued on Blu-Ray by Eagle Rock Entertainment, and the results are excellent." Brandon A. DuHamel of Big Picture Big Sound also exclaimed "Earth, Wind, & Fire: Live at Montreux 1997 keeps the groove movin' with a solid audio and video transfer from Eagle Rock Entertainment capturing an exciting live performance. It's party time, and EWF has the tunes."

== Set list ==
- (1.) "Rock That"
- (2.) "Jupiter"
- (3.) "Saturday Nite"
- (4.) "Revolution"
- (5.) "Gratitude"
- (6.) "September"
- (7.) "Let's Groove"
- (8.) "Rockit"
- (9.) "Sun Goddess"
- (10.) "Can't Hide Love"
- (11.) "That's the Way of the World"
- (12.) "Drum Solo"
- (13.) "Reasons"
- (14.) "Fantasy"
- (15.) "Mo’s Solo"
- (16.) "Boogie Wonderland
- (17.) "After The Love Has Gone"
- (18.) "Sing a Song"
- (19.) "Shining Star"
- (20.) "Devotion"

=== Bonus 1998 Performance ===
- (21.) "Kalimba Funk Intro"
- (22.) "Medley: Pride/Mighty Mighty"
- (23.) "In the Stone"
- (24.) "Solo Percussion"
- (25.) "I'll Write a Song for You"
- (26.) "Love's Holiday"
- (27.) "Getaway"
