= Tamiko Jones =

American singer (born 1945)

- Also known as: Timiko; Tamiko
- Born: Barbara Tamiko Ferguson; 1945 (age 80–81)
- Origin: Kyle, West Virginia, United States
- Genres: R&B, soul, jazz
- Occupation: Singer
- Years active: 1963–1980s
- Labels: Checker, Golden World, Atlantic, A & M, December, Metromedia, Arista, Contempo, Atlantis, Polydor, Sutra

Tamiko Jones (born Barbara Tamiko Ferguson; 1945) is an American singer. Her most successful record was "Touch Me Baby (Reaching Out For Your Love)" in 1975.

== Career ==
Barbara Tamiko Ferguson was born in Kyle, West Virginia, and is of part Japanese, British, and Cherokee descent. Her middle name, Tamiko, is of Japanese origin. She was raised in Detroit where she first started singing she made her professional debut in a club in 1961. She began her career performing pop songs in a jazz style. Her first record release, credited simply as Timiko, was "Is It A Sin?", issued by Checker Records in 1963. She moved to the Atco label, where she recorded "Rhapsody" as Tamiko in 1964.

By 1966 she had moved to the Golden World label, recording "I'm Spellbound". Next she moved to Atlantic Records, where she released several singles during 1967, including "Boy You're Growing On Me". That year, she also recorded the album A Mann and a Woman with jazz flutist Herbie Mann. During the 1960s, she also appeared as an extra in several movies.

In August 1967, after the release of her album with Mann, she was signed by Jimmy Wisner's new label December Records. Wisner had arranged and conducted a number of the tracks on A Mann And A Woman, this resulted in the album Tamiko, released in February 1968.

In 1968, after being hospitalized with polio, she met singer Solomon Burke, and they recorded several duets. Jones became Burke's fiancée and manager for a time, and co-produced his cover of the Creedence Clearwater Revival hit single "Proud Mary".

She also recorded the album I'll Be Anything For You, arranged by Artie Butler, produced by Creed Taylor's for his CTI label, an imprint of A&M Records at the time. All the tracks were short, radio format and resulted in two singles, Ya Ya / Goodnight My Love and Goodnight, My Love / Please Return Your Love To Me. The recording sessions for the album were held in two studios - In June, with Solomon Burke, at the Sam Phillips Phillips Recording studio and in September at the Van Gelder Studio.

In 1969 her album In Muscle Shoals was issued on the Metromedia label.

In the early 1970's she resumed her performing career with appearances in Las Vegas, but these were too strenuous and Jones returned to New York. In 1971, she began an engagement at the Rainbow Room with pianist and conductor, Frank Owens.

Her first chart hit, and most successful record, was "Touch Me Baby (Reaching Out For Your Love)", written by Johnny Bristol and issued by Arista Records, which reached no. 12 on the Billboard R&B chart and no. 60 on the US pop chart in 1975. Its follow-up, "Just You and Me", reached no. 78 on the R&B chart. She also released an album, Love Trip.

In 1976, the single "Let It Flow" (no. 76 R&B) was released on the Contempo Records label, owned by John Abbey, who was also the British founder and editor of Blues & Soul magazine. She and Abbey married in Atlanta, Georgia in 1977.

In 1977, "Cloudy", on the Atlantis label, made no. 92 on the R&B chart, and in 1979 her version of "Can't Live Without Your Love", written and arranged by Randy Muller of Brass Construction and issued on the Polydor label, reached no. 70 on the same chart. Her last R&B chart hit was a version of Marvin Gaye's "I Want You", recorded on the Sutra label and which made no. 81 in 1986. In the early 1990s, Jones worked as Smokey Robinson's manager.

In 2008, "Can't Live Without Your Love" was featured on the soundtrack to the video game Grand Theft Auto IV

Jones vocal tracks continue to be popular today and receive regular remixes and edits. In April 2024, her track "Let It Flow", from the 1976 album Cloudy was remixed by Disco Dandies and released on the High Fashion Music label.

== Discography ==
=== Chart singles ===
Year	Title	US	US AC	US R&B	US Dance
1966	"A Man and a Woman"	88	9	–	–
1975	"Touch Me Baby (Reaching Out for Your Love)"	60	–	12	–
1975	"Just You and Me"	–	–	78	–
1976	"Let It Flow"	–	–	76	39
1977	"Cloudy"	–	–	92	–
1979	"Can't Live Without Your Love"	–	–	70	23
1986	"I Want You"	–	–	81	–

=== Albums ===
- A Mann & A Woman (Atlantic, 1967) with Herbie Mann
- I'll Be Anything For You (CTI, 1968)
- Tamiko (December, 1968)
- In Muscle Shoals (Metromedia, 1969)
- Love Trip (Arista, 1975)
- Cloudy (Atlantis, 1976)

=== As backing vocalist ===
With Herbie Mann

- The Beat Goes On (Atlantic, 1967)
