= Live in Rio (Earth, Wind & Fire album) =

Live album by Earth, Wind & Fire
- Released: November 19, 2002
- Genre: R&B
- Label: Kalimba
- Producer: Maurice White

Earth, Wind & Fire chronology
The Essential Earth, Wind & Fire (2002)	Live in Rio (2002)	The Promise (2003)

Live in Rio is a live album by American band Earth, Wind & Fire released in November 2002 on Kalimba Music.

== Overview ==
The album was recorded during a 1980 performance in Rio de Janeiro, Brazil.

== Critical reception ==
Professional ratings
Review scores
Source	Rating
AllMusic	3/5 stars
Billboard	(favourable)
Boston Globe	(favourable)

Billboard called the album "a colourful, smile generating showcase" adding "the energetic set runs through a series of signature hits and album tracks; throughout, the Rio fans roar with approval." Steve Morse of the Boston Globe found Live in Rio "sounds dated, and some of the sound quality sounds shrill, but the band's boogie down energy still carries the night". With a three out of five stars rating Alex Henderson of AllMusic called the LP "a valuable if imperfect addition to their catalog" though " Live in Rio is still something to celebrate."

== Track listing ==
No.	Title	Writer(s)	Length
1.	"Dialog"	Maurice White, Verdine White	1:13
2.	"Rock That!"	David Foster, Maurice White	0:52
3.	"In the Stone"	David Foster, Maurice White, Allee Willis	4:23
4.	"Serpentine Fire"	Sonny Burke, Maurice White, Verdine White	4:08
5.	"Fantasy"	Eduardo del Barrio, Maurice White, Verdine White	3:58
6.	"Can't Let Go"	Billy Myers, Maurice White, Allee Willis	3:21
7.	"Getaway"	Peter Cor, Beloyd Taylor	5:25
8.	"Brazilian Rhyme (Beijo)"	Toninho Horta	2:09
9.	"Magic Mind"	Philip Bailey, Larry Dunn, Al McKay, Maurice White, Verdine White, Freddie White	3:57
10.	"Runnin'"	Eduardo del Barrio, Larry Dunn, Maurice White	6:05
11.	"After the Love Has Gone"	Bill Champlin, David Foster, Jay Graydon	6:04
12.	"Rio After Dark"	Philip Bailey, Larry Dunn, Al McKay, Maurice White, Verdine White, Freddie White	3:02
13.	"Got to Get You into My Life"	John Lennon, Paul McCartney	4:11
14.	"Boogie Wonderland"	Jon Lind, Allee Willis	3:18
15.	"September"	Al McKay, Maurice White, Allee Willis	3:43

Japanese Release (Bonus track)
No.	Title	Writer(s)	Length
16.	"Ain't No Remedy"	Gary Haase, Larry Loftin	4:38

== Personnel ==
Musicians

- Philip Bailey – percussion, vocals, background vocals
- Sylvia Cox – background vocals
- Rahmlee Michael Davis - trumpet, flugelhorn
- Larry Dunn – keyboards
- Johnny Graham - Guitar
- Michael Harris – trumpet, flugelhorn
- Ralph Johnson– percussion, background vocals
- Judith Jones – background vocals
- Al McKay – guitar, background vocals
- Don Myrick – saxophone
- Louis Satterfield – trombone
- Carla Vaughn – background vocals
- Fred White - drums
- Maurice White – percussion, vocals, background vocals, kalimba
- Verdine White – bass
- Andrew Woolfolk - saxophone

Production

- K.C. Blinn – art direction, cover design
- Robert Ellison – A&R
- Steve Hall – mastering
- Paul Klingberg – mixing
- Cameron Marcarelli – assistant engineer
- Jeffrey Mayer – photography
- Herb Powell – A&R
- Maurice White – executive producer
