= All in the Way =

Single by Earth, Wind & Fire featuring the Emotions

from the album The Promise
- Released: March 2003
- Genre: R&B
- Length: 3:33
- Label: Kalimba Music
- Songwriter(s): Wayne Vaughn, Wanda Vaughn, Wendi Vaughn and Maurice White
- Producer(s): Maurice White

Earth, Wind & Fire singles chronology
"September '99" (1999)	"All in the Way" (2003)	"Hold Me" (2003)

The Emotions singles chronology
"If I Only Knew Then (What I Know Now)" (1985)	"All in the Way" (2003)

"All in the Way" is a song by the band Earth, Wind & Fire featuring the Emotions, released as a single in 2003 on Kalimba Music from the album The Promise. The single peaked at No. 13 on the Billboard Adult R&B Songs chart, No. 25 on the Billboard Adult Contemporary chart, and No. 31 on the UK R&B Singles chart.

"All in the Way" was written by Maurice White, Wayne Vaughn, Wanda Vaughn and Wendi Vaughn, and produced by White.

== Critical reception ==
People described "All in the Way" as a "funky, finger-popping mid-tempo number". David Peschek of The Guardian described the song as "effortlessly feelgood".

== Charts ==
Chart (2003)	Peak position
US Billboard Adult Contemporary	25
US Billboard Adult R&B Songs	13
US Billboard Hot R&B/Hip-Hop Songs	77
UK R&B Singles	31
UK Independent Singles	45
