= Spread Your Love =

Spread Your Love may refer to:

- "Spread Your Love", a song by 2 Unlimited from the 1995 album Hits Unlimited
- "Spread Your Love", a song by Black Rebel Motorcycle Club from their 2001 album B.R.M.C.
- "Spread Your Love", a song by Earth, Wind & Fire from their 1983 album Powerlight
