= Spirit (Earth, Wind & Fire album) =

Studio album by Earth, Wind & Fire
- Released: September 28, 1976
- Recorded: 1976
- Studios: Burbank Studios, Burbank, CA; Hollywood Sound Recorders, Los Angeles, CA; Wally Heider Studios, Los Angeles, CA; Westlake Audio, West Hollywood, California
- Genres: Soul; funk; disco
- Length: 36:32
- Label: Columbia
- Producers: Maurice White, Charles Stepney

Earth, Wind & Fire chronology
Gratitude (1975)	Spirit (1976)	All 'n All (1977)

Singles from Spirit
- 1. "Getaway" Released: July 7, 1976; 2. "Saturday Nite" Released: November 13, 1976; 3. "On Your Face" Released: April 6, 1977

Spirit is the seventh studio album by American band Earth, Wind & Fire, released on September 28, 1976, by Columbia Records. The album rose to No. 2 on both the Billboard 200 and Top Soul Albums charts. Spirit has also been certified Double Platinum in the US by the RIAA.

The band's long time collaborator Charles Stepney died in the midst of its recording sessions; Maurice White went on to mostly arrange and produce the album. The LP was entitled Spirit in dedication to Stepney.

== Singles ==
"Getaway" reached No. 1 on the Billboard Hot Soul Songs chart. The single also rose to No. 12 on both the Billboard Hot 100 and Disco Action Top 30 charts. "Saturday Nite" peaked at No. 4 on the Billboard Hot Soul Songs chart and No. 21 on the Billboard Hot 100 chart. The song also reached No. 12 on Billboard's Disco Action Top 30 chart and No. 17 on the UK Pop Singles chart.

== Critical reception ==
Professional ratings
Review scores
Source	Rating
AllMusic	4.5/5 stars
The New York Times	(favorable)
PopMatters	(favorable)
Music Week	(favorable)
Village Voice	(B)
Blues & Soul	(favorable)
Rolling Stone	(favorable)
Vibe	4.5/5 stars
Variety	(favorable)
The Record	(favorable)

John Abbey of Blues & Soul called Spirit "a mighty, mighty album...(displaying) the power of the nine-piece Earth Wind & Fire conglomeration." Billboard found that the album's "arrangements, songs, sweet floating vocal harmonies and punching instrumental phrases are all best described as impeccable". Joe McEwen of Rolling Stone exclaimed "Though most of Spirit maintains a high level of artistic competence, I find the new album to be like a bean-sprout salad — undeniably nutritious, but hardly filling." Craig Werner of Vibe in a 4.5/5 review, called Spirit "one of the group's defining moments" and "gospel soul for the ages". Within a 4.5/5 stars review Alex Henderson of AllMusic declared, "With That's the Way of the World having enjoyed multi-platinum success, Earth, Wind & Fire had a lot to live up to when the time came for another studio project. And the soul powerhouse didn't let anyone down (either commercially or creatively) on the outstanding Spirit." Joel Vance of Stereo Review dismissed the album opining "Maybe the members of the band are sincere in their beliefs, but they come across here as a sappy group with hackneyed arrangements, fey vocals, and songs loaded with the usual hey -baby -let's -get -it -on -in -the -cosmos twaddle." Robert Christgau of the The Village Voice in B-grade review remarked, "EW&F are the real black MOR...because the post-Sly and harmony-group usages they've had to master are so rich and resilient. Most of these songs are fun to listen to."

Music Week proclaimed "With a more spiritual, ethereal feel than the six albums they had already cut to that point, it really marks a turning point in their career and is crammed with excellent tunes." Simon Warner of PopMatters noted the album's "ear-catching repertoire...(to) confirm EW&F as a world talent, yet its shiny production and its impeccable vocal layering lacks the surprises that Open Our Eyes provides." Rick Atkinson of The Record wrote "Any album that can hit the album charts, the single charts, and discos all at once is a guaranteed success. John Rockwell of The New York Times declared "What is most interesting about Maurice White and his musicians... is their refusal to be locked into any stylistic format. Mr. White's record will be labeled 'disco' in some quarters, and indeed parts of if, would not sound out of place in a disco. But, generally, Earth, Wind and Fire is closer to jazz, or to jazz rock, than to the thumping formulas of disco. And yet the group isn't afraid to slip in a ballad, either." Variety also found "Another solid rhythm and blues session with one of the slickest acts of the genre, Earth, Wind & Fire, which always keeps it together...A couple of instrumentals break up a lot of smooth, polished vocal instrumental trips."

Isaac Hayes called Spirit one of Earth, Wind & Fire's five essential recordings. Rick Atkinson of The Record placed Spirit at number 5 on his list of the top 15 albums of 1976. Spirit was also nominated for an American Music Award for Favorite Soul/R&B Album. The song "Earth, Wind & Fire" was also Grammy nominated in the category of Best Instrumental Composition.

== Track listing ==
=== Original release ===
Side one
No.	Title	Writer(s)	Length
1.	"Getaway"	Peter Cor; Bernard "Beloyd" Taylor	3:47
2.	"On Your Face"	Charles Stepney; Maurice White; Philip Bailey	4:34
3.	"Imagination"	Stepney; White; Bailey	5:15
4.	"Spirit"	Larry Dunn; White	3:12

Side two
No.	Title	Writer(s)	Length
5.	"Saturday Nite"	Al McKay; White; Bailey	4:03
6.	"Earth, Wind & Fire"	Skip Scarborough; White	4:40
7.	"Departure"	Dunn; White	0:27
8.	"Biyo"	White; McKay	3:37
9.	"Burnin' Bush"	Jerry Peters	6:46

=== 2001 reissue ===
Legacy CK 65739
No.	Title	Writer(s)	Length
1.	"Getaway"	Cor; Taylor	3:47
2.	"On Your Face"	Stepney; White; Bailey	4:34
3.	"Imagination"	Stepney; White; Bailey	5:15
4.	"Spirit"	Dunn; White	3:12
5.	"Saturday Nite"	McKay; White; Bailey	4:03
6.	"Earth, Wind and Fire"	Scarborough; White	4:40
7.	"Departure"	Dunn; White	0:27
8.	"Biyo"	White; McKay	3:37
9.	"Burnin' Bush"	Jerry Peters	6:46
10.	"Saturday Nite (Alternate Mix)"	White; McKay; Bailey	4:55
11.	"Seraphim"	White; McKay; Bailey; Dunn	2:06
12.	"Imagination (Angels Mix)"	Stepney; White; Bailey	1:02
13.	"Departure (The Traveler)"	Dunn; White	3:37
14.	"African Symphony"	Dunn; White	1:52

== Personnel ==
- Maurice White – vocals, kalimba, timbales, drums, producer (original recording), audio mixing (10–14)
- Philip Bailey – vocals, congas, percussion
- Verdine White – vocals, bass, percussion
- Larry Dunn – piano, keyboards, organ, Moog synthesizer
- Jerry Peters – piano, keyboards, arranger (8–9)
- Al McKay – guitar, percussion
- Johnny Graham – guitar
- Fred White – drums, percussion
- Ralph Johnson – drums, percussion
- Andrew Woolfolk – saxophone, percussion
- Harvey Mason – percussion
- Don Myrick – saxophone
- George Bohanon – trombone, brass
- Louis Satterfield – trombone, brass
- Charles Loper – trombone, brass
- Lew McCreary – bass trombone, brass
- Oscar Brashear – trumpet, brass
- Charles Findley – trumpet, brass
- Michael Harris – trumpet, brass
- Steve Madaio – trumpet, brass
- David Duke – French horn, brass
- Arthur Maebe – French horn, brass
- Sidney Muldrow – French horn, brass
- Marilyn Robinson – French horn, brass
- Tommy Johnson – tuba, brass
- Charles Veal – concertmaster
- Dorothy Ashby – harp
- Ronald Cooper – cello, strings
- Marie Fera – cello, strings
- Dennis Karmazyn – cello, strings
- Harry Shlutz – cello, strings
- Marilyn Baker – viola, strings
- David Campbell – viola, strings
- Denyse Buffum – viola, strings
- Rollice Dale – viola, strings
- James Dunham – viola, strings
- Paul Polivnick – viola, strings
- Lynn Subotnick – viola, strings
- Barbara Thomason – viola, strings
- Asa Drori – violin, strings
- Winterton Garvey – violin, strings
- Harris Goldman – violin, strings
- Carl LaMagna – violin, strings
- Joy Lyle – violin, strings
- Sandy Seemore – violin, strings
- Haim Shtrum – violin, strings
- Ken Yerke – violin, strings
- Charles Stepney – producer (original recording), arranger (1–3, 5–7)
- Leo Sacks – producer (reissue), audio mixing (10–14)
- Tom Tom 84 – arranger (4)
- George Massenburg – engineer, remix
- Paul Klingberg – audio mixing (10–14)

== Charts and certifications ==
=== Charts ===
Album
Year	Chart	Position
1976	US Billboard Top Soul Albums	2
1976	US Billboard 200	2
1976	UK Blues & Soul Top British Soul Albums	2
1976	New Zealand Albums (RIANZ)	33
1976	Japanese Albums (Oricon)	59

==== Year-end charts ====
Chart (1977)	Position
U.S. Billboard Top Soul Albums	11

=== Singles ===
Singles
Year	Single	Chart	Position
1976	"Getaway/Saturday Nite"	Billboard Dance Club Songs	9
1976	"Getaway"	Billboard Hot Soul Songs	1
1976	"Getaway"	Billboard Hot 100	12
1976	"On Your Face"	Billboard Hot Soul Songs	26
1976	"Saturday Nite"	Billboard Hot Soul Songs	4
1976	"Saturday Nite"	Billboard Hot 100	21
1976	"Saturday Nite"	UK Singles Chart	17
1976	"Saturday Nite"	Official New Zealand Music Chart	34

=== Certifications ===
Country	Award
US (RIAA)	Double Platinum
