= On Your Face =

- Japan release picture sleeve

Single by Earth, Wind & Fire

from the album Spirit
- B-side: "Biyo"
- Released: April 6, 1977
- Recorded: 1977
- Genre: R&B; soul; funk
- Length: 2:59
- Label: Columbia
- Songwriter(s): Maurice White, Charles Stepney, Philip Bailey
- Producer(s): Maurice White, Charles Stepney

Earth, Wind & Fire singles chronology
"Saturday Nite" (1976)	"On Your Face" (1977)	"Serpentine Fire" (1977)

"On Your Face" is a song by R&B/funk band Earth, Wind & Fire, released in 1977 on Columbia Records as the third single from the band's seventh studio album Spirit. The song reached No. 26 on the Billboard Hot Soul Singles chart.

== Overview ==
"On Your Face" was produced by Maurice White and Charles Stepney, and they co-wrote it with Philip Bailey.

== Critical reception ==
Simon Warner of PopMatters described "On Your Face" as one of Spirit's "high points". Alex Henderson of AllMusic defined the song as "optimistic".

== Samples ==
"On Your Face" has been sampled on "Party Ain't a Party" by Queen Pen and "Sixtyten" by Boards of Canada. It was sampled on "Number 1" by Mystery Skulls featuring Brandy and Nile Rodgers, "Be Faithful" by Fatman Scoop featuring Faith Evans and "On Your Face" by MC Hammer featuring Charles Salter & Special Generation.

== Charts ==
Chart (1977)	Peak position
U.S. Billboard Hot Soul Singles	26
