= Electric Universe (album) =

Studio album by Earth, Wind & Fire
- Released: November 14, 1983
- Recorded: 1983
- Studios: The Complex (Los Angeles, California)
- Genres: New wave; synth-pop; R&B; funk
- Length: 37:40
- Label: Columbia
- Producers: Maurice White: Wayne Vaughn (co-producer on Tracks 3 & 6)

Earth, Wind & Fire chronology
| Powerlight (1983) | Electric Universe (1983) | The Collection (1986) |

Singles from Electric Universe
- 1. "Magnetic" Released: November 1983; 2. "Touch" Released: January 1984; 3. "Moonwalk" Released: April 1984

Electric Universe is the thirteenth studio album by American band Earth, Wind & Fire, released in November 1983 on Columbia Records. The album rose to No. 8 on the US Billboard Top Soul Albums chart and No. 40 on the US Billboard 200 chart. Electric Universe also reached No. 17 on the Swedish Pop Albums chart, No. 18 on the UK Blues & Soul Top British Soul Albums chart, No. 20 on the Japanese Pop Albums chart and No. 22 on both the Dutch Pop Albums and Swiss Pop Albums charts.

== Overview ==
Electric Universe was produced by Maurice White for Kalimba Productions. With the album came a unique new wave and synth-pop sound for the band.

Artists such as David Foster, Martin Page, Michel Colombier and Pamela Hutchinson and Wanda Vaughn of The Emotions featured upon the album. The album was also reissued in 2015 with six bonus tracks and two demos.

As well, Electric Universe was featured in an August 2016 episode of Mass Appeal's YouTube series Rhythm Roulette.

== Singles ==
The lead single, "Magnetic" peaked at No. 10 on the Billboard Hot R&B Singles chart and No. 36 on the Billboard Hot Dance Club Play chart. "Touch" reached No. 23 on the Billboard Hot R&B Singles chart and No. 36 on the Billboard Adult Contemporary Songs chart.

== Critical reception ==
Professional ratings
Review scores
| Source | Rating |
|---|---|
| AllMusic | 2/5 stars |
| Knight Ridder | 7/10 |
| The Morning Call | (favorable) |
| Omaha World Herald | 4/5 stars |
| Record Mirror | 3/5 stars |
| Rolling Stone | 3/5 stars |
| The Village Voice | B |

Harry Sumrall of the San Jose Mercury News said "Electric Universe is from first note to last an engaging record." Gary Graff of the Detroit Free Press exclaimed: "Plug in the planets! This is the best disc this outfit has put together in quite some time." Connie Johnson of the Los Angeles Times proclaimed that "the album focuses on dance and romance as opposed to the more serious ideals of cosmic bliss and brotherhood that this eight-member aggregation usually espouses. EWF is still master of the contemporary big-band style: busy but not bloated. The overall feel is jubilant and the Emotions-like harmonies on the bouncy "Moonwalk" are mildly affecting." Lennox Samuels of The Dallas Morning News declared that Electric Universe "shows the bands resilience. Unlike the previous offering Powerlight this LP should please fans." Samuels added "Although most of the cuts here are characterized by mellow overtures, midway through the disc, colourful kalimba choruses and airy harmonies capture the high spirits of this nine member aggregation". While calling the album a "letdown" Robert Christgau of The Village Voice gave a B graded review. Roger Catlin of the Omaha World Herald, in a four out of five star review, declared "Synthesizers and new technology get a workout here, but there is still fine vocalizing at the core - but also too many ballads". With a three out of five stars review Matty Karas of Rolling Stone described Electric Universe as being full of "sensuous, and at times, rock oriented dance material". Pam Lambert of The Wall Street Journal exclaimed "After more than a decade together, Earth, Wind and Fire continue to chart new ground". She added, "In Maurice's otherwordly universe of synthesized sound, individual instruments like guitars and keyboards are drowned into the overall sonic mix. But, by way of compensation, this does focus attention on the group's trademark, their multitextured vocals."

Phyl Garland of Stereo Review wrote "Although 'Electric Universe' does not scintillate with Earth, Wind & Fire's usual brilliance, it's skilfully crafted and worth a listen". Garland noted EW&F's performance was "not among their best", but still called the album a "very good recording". Rick Shefchik of Knight Ridder, in a 7/10 review stated "Fearing more of Maurice White's cosmic pablum, I was glad to notice the shift to concrete r&b on Side One, while the band retains its breathy mix of horns and voices". Shefchik added "White relinquished his songwriting role on the first three songs, and even the ones he did write seem to benefit from a less starry-eyed perspective. Unless, of course, you count Electric Nation and Spirit of a New World." Prentis Rogers of The Atlanta Journal-Constitution wrote: "In fact, the entire album holds up well lyrically and musically with a noticeable but not overpowering rock flavor. It may not signal a return to the group's standard of staying a note or two ahead of its contemporaries, but this is EWF's best album in recent years."

Don McLeese of the Chicago Sun Times also gave Electric Universe an honourable mention in his list of the top ten albums of 1983.

== Track listing ==
Side one
| No. | Title | Writer(s) | Length |
|---|---|---|---|
| 1. | "Magnetic" | Martin Page | 4:19 |
| 2. | "Touch" | Jon Lind, Martin Page | 4:54 |
| 3. | "Moonwalk" | David Porter, Desmond O'Connor | 4:08 |
| 4. | "Could It Be Right" | Allee Willis, David Foster, Maurice White | 5:15 |

Side two
| No. | Title | Writer(s) | Length |
|---|---|---|---|
| 5. | "Spirit of a New World" | Brian Fairweather, David Foster, Martin Page, Maurice White | 4:29 |
| 6. | "Sweet Sassy Lady" | Lisa Vaughn, Maurice White, Wanda Vaughn, Wayne Vaughn | 4:08 |
| 7. | "We're Living in Our Own Time" | Allee Willis, Maurice White, Michel Colombier | 5:18 |
| 8. | "Electric Nation" | Brian Fairweather, Martin Page, Maurice White | 4:30 |

2015 Expanded Edition Bonus Tracks
| No. | Title | Writer(s) | Length |
|---|---|---|---|
| 9. | "Magnetic" (Extended Dance Remix) | Martin Page | 6:24 |
| 10. | "Magnetic" (Instrumental) | Martin Page | 5:49 |
| 11. | "Magnetic" (7" Version) | Martin Page | 3:52 |
| 12. | "Spirit of a New World" (Demo Version) | Maurice White, Martin Page, David Foster, Brian Fairweather | 4:35 |
| 13. | "El Solitario (We're Living in Our Own Time)" (Demo Version) | Maurice White, Michel Colombier, Allee Willis | 5:14 |
| 14. | "Here's to Love" (Instrumental) | Maurice White | 4:22 |
| 15. | "Club Foot" | Maurice White | 3:59 |
| 16. | "Milky Way" | Maurice White | 5:23 |

== Credits ==
Earth, Wind & Fire

- Philip Bailey – lead vocals, backing vocals
- Maurice White – lead vocals, backing vocals, drums
- Larry Dunn – acoustic piano, synthesizers, synthesizer programming
- Roland Bautista – guitars
- Verdine White – bass
- Fred White – drums, percussion
- Ralph Johnson – percussion
- Andrew Woolfolk – tenor saxophone

Additional musicians

- Robbie Buchanan – synthesizers, synthesizer programming
- Michel Colombier – keyboards
- Brian Fairweather – synthesizer programming
- David Foster – keyboards
- Martin Page – synthesizer programming
- Wayne Vaughn – keyboards
- Jerry Hey – synthesizer arrangements
- John Gilston – Simmons drums
- Pamela Hutchinson – backing vocals
- Beloyd Taylor – backing vocals
- Wanda Vaughn – backing vocals

Production

- Maurice White – producer
- Wayne Vaughn – co-producer (3, 6)
- Mick Guzauski – recording, remixing
- George Massenburg – remixing
- Murray Dvorkin – assistant engineer
- Barbara Rooney – assistant engineer
- Bernie Grundman – mastering at A&M Studios (Hollywood, California)
- David Coleman – design, composite illustration
- Image Bank West – photography
- Phil Fewsmith – portrait photography

Reissue

- Tony Culvert – producer
- Sean Brennan – mastering
- Randy Mahon – artist/musician interview coordinator
- Jeff James – reissue coordinator
- Craig Turnbull – release coordinator
- Matt Murphy – production manager
- Roger Williams – package design
- Alex Henderson – liner notes, research

== Charts ==
Albums
| Chart (1983) | Peak position |
|---|---|
| Dutch Albums (Dutch Album Top 100) | 22 |
| German Albums (Offizielle Charts) | 37 |
| Japanese Albums (Oricon) | 20 |
| Sweden Albums (Sverigetopplistan) | 17 |
| Swiss Albums (Swiss Hitparade) | 22 |
| UK Blues & Soul Top British Soul Albums | 18 |
| US Top LPs & Tape (Billboard) | 40 |
| US Top Soul Albums (Billboard) | 8 |

Singles
| Year | Single | Chart | Position |
|---|---|---|---|
| 1983 | "Magnetic" | Belgian Singles Ultratop 50 Singles | 16 |
| 1983 | "Magnetic" | Netherlands Dutch Single Top 100 | 18 |
| 1983 | "Magnetic" | US Billboard Hot 100 | 57 |
| 1983 | "Magnetic" | US Hot R&B Singles (Billboard) | 10 |
| 1983 | "Magnetic" | US Hot Dance/Club Play (Billboard) | 36 |
| 1983 | "Magnetic" | UK Blues & Soul Top British Soul Singles | 23 |
| 1984 | "Electric Nation" | Dutch Single Tip | 7 |
| 1984 | "Touch" | US Hot R&B Singles (Billboard) | 23 |
| 1984 | "Touch" | US Adult Contemporary (Billboard) | 36 |
| 1984 | "Moonwalk" | US Hot R&B Singles (Billboard) | 67 |

== Sales ==
The album sold more than 100,000 units in Japan.
