= Fall in Love with Me =

Fall in Love with Me may refer to:

- "Fall in Love with Me" (song), a 1982 song by Earth, Wind & Fire
- Fall in Love with Me (TV series), a 2014 Taiwanese television series
