= The Promise (Earth, Wind & Fire album) =

Studio album by Earth, Wind & Fire
- Released: May 20, 2003
- Recorded: 2002–2003
- Studios: Magnet Vision Studios (Santa Monica, California); Record Plant and Gold Rush Studios (Los Angeles, California); The Enterprise (Burbank, California); Cardraygee Studios (Oak Park, California); Pacifique Studios (North Hollywood, California)
- Genres: R&B; funk; neo soul; hip hop soul
- Length: 56:42
- Label: Kalimba
- Producers: Maurice White; Wayne Vaughn; Gregory Curtis; Preston Glass; Paul Klingberg; Robert Brookins; Tim & Bob; Ralph Johnson

Earth, Wind & Fire chronology
Live in Rio (2002)	The Promise (2003)	Love Songs (2004)

Reissue cover
- 2009 reissue cover

Singles from The Promise
- 1. "All in the Way" Released: May 2003; 2. "Hold Me" Released: August 2003; 3. "Never" Released: December 2014; 4. "Why?" Released: March 2015

The Promise is the eighteenth studio album by American band Earth, Wind & Fire released in May 2003 on Kalimba Music. The album peaked at No. 19 on the Billboard Top R&B/Hip-Hop Albums chart and No. 5 on the Billboard Top Independent Albums chart.

== Overview ==
The Promise was executively produced by Maurice White. Artists such as Angie Stone, The Emotions, Gerald Albright and Paulinho Da Costa featured on the LP. The album's cover art was also designed by Morito Suzuki.

"Where Do We Go from Here" and "Dirty" were originally recorded during the I Am sessions and remixed for this album. "Dirty", in particular, in its original form with blues legend Junior Wells, already appeared on the 1992 box-set The Eternal Dance.

== Singles ==
The track "All in the Way" featuring The Emotions reached No. 13 on the Billboard Adult R&B Songs chart and No. 25 on the Billboard Adult Contemporary chart.

The songs, "Never" and "Why?" peaked at Nos. 17 and 19, respectively, on the Billboard Smooth Jazz Songs chart. "Hold Me", produced and written by Tim & Bob, reached No. 28 on the Billboard Adult R&B Songs chart. "Hold Me" was also Grammy nominated for Best Traditional R&B Vocal Performance.

== Critical reception ==
Professional ratings
Review scores
Source	Rating
AllMusic	3/5 stars
Blender	3/5 stars
Dayton Daily News	B
The Guardian	4/5 stars
USA Today	3.5/5 stars
Associated Press	(favourable)
Washington Post	(favourable)

People called The Promise a "musically rich 17-track set (including five trademark instrumental interludes) that blows away most of today’s R&B." With a 3/5 stars review, Chairman Mao of Blender proclaimed that EWF "maintains their trademark buoyancy on a classy collection of mid-tempo numbers and sweeping ballads." Rob Theakston of AllMusic in a 3/5 stars review, declared the album is "extremely soulful and soothing". With a 3.5 out of five star rating Steve Jones of USA Today wrote "with horn-kissed ballads and infectious jazz funk grooves, the band seems to have regained its spark". Renee Graham of the Boston Globe claimed, "unfussy and sincere, this is well-crafted R&B for grown ups". David Peschek of The Guardian also in a 4/5 stars review, called The Promise "17 tracks of immaculately smooth, meticulously detailed mid-tempo pop-soul and thoroughly intoxicating in its lushness." Tamara Palmer critic SF Weekly wrote: "Joyous without raising the hackles of cynicism, The Promise honors its vow of delivering songs of the consistent quality that EWF devotees knew were still inside original players Maurice and Verdine White and Philip Bailey."

== Track listing ==
The Promise track listing
No.	Title	Writer(s)	Length
1.	"All in the Way" (featuring The Emotions)	Wayne Vaughn, Wanda Vaughn, Maurice White	4:28
2.	"Betcha'"	Preston Glass, Maurice White	3:43
3.	"Wiggle"	Preston Glass	0:39
4.	"Why?"	Gregory Curtis, Maurice White	4:04
5.	"Wonderland"" (featuring Angie Stone)	Chris Rodriguez, Tommy Sims	4:05
6.	"Where Do We Go from Here?"	Bill Meyers, Ross Vannelli	5:21
7.	"Freedom"	Maurice White	0:42
8.	"Hold Me"	Tim Kelley, Bob Robinson	4:37
9.	"Never"	Gregory Curtis, Maurice White	5:08
10.	"Prelude"		0:40
11.	"All About Love"	Sheila Hutchinson, Wanda Vaughn, Wayne Vaughn	4:24
12.	"Suppose You Like Me"	Scott Storch, Pino Palladino, James Poyser, Questlove, Sir James Bailey	4:37
13.	"The Promise"	Raymond Crossley, Ralph Johnson, Maurice White	0:27
14.	"She Waits"	Marc Harris, Tommy Sims	5:09
15.	"The Promise (Continued)"	Maurice White, Ralph Johnson	0:51
16.	"Let Me Love You"	Gregory Curtis	4:17
17.	"Dirty"	Maurice White	3:47

Japan bonus tracks
No.	Title	Writer(s)	Length
12.	"Soul"	Maurice White, Ralph Johnson, Carlos Rios	3:48
18.	"So Lucky"	Scott Storch, Questlove, Sir James Bailey	4:44

== Personnel ==
Earth, Wind & Fire

- Philip Bailey – backing vocals (1, 2, 16), lead vocals (2, 5, 8, 9, 12)
- Maurice White – lead vocals (1, 4, 5, 8, 11, 14, 16), backing vocals (1, 2, 4, 5, 8, 9, 11, 16), kalimba (1, 13, 15), vocals (13, 15)
- Verdine White – bass (1, 2, 4, 5, 9, 11, 12, 14, 16)
- Ralph Johnson – percussion, backing vocals, drum programming (13, 15)

Additional musicians

- Wayne Vaughn – keyboards (1, 11), drums (1, 11)
- Gregory Curtis – keyboards (2, 4, 5, 9, 16), drum programming (2, 4, 9, 16)
- Preston Glass – keyboard programming (3)
- Alan Hewitt – keyboards (6)
- Bill Meyers – acoustic piano solo (6)
- Tim Kelley – keyboards (8), bass (8), drums (8), drum programming (8)
- Freddie Ravel – acoustic piano (9)
- Robert Brookins – keyboards (12), drum programming (12)
- Raymond Crossley – keyboards (13, 15)
- Wayne Linsey – keyboards (13, 15)
- Myron McKinley – keyboards (14)
- Tom Mgrdichian – keyboards (14)
- Greg "G-Mo" Moore – guitars (1, 11, 12)
- Eric Walls – guitars (2, 16)
- Darrell Crooks – guitars (4, 9)
- Chris Rodriguez – guitars (5)
- Bob Robinson – guitars (8)
- Carlos Rios – guitars (14)
- Cameron Marcarelli – additional drum programming (3, 5)
- John Paris – drums (5, 12, 14)
- Daniel de los Reyes – percussion (2, 16)
- Paulinho da Costa – percussion (4, 9)
- Daryl "Munyungo" Jackson – percussion (11)
- Gary Bias – saxophones (1, 5, 9, 11, 12), flute (11)
- Gerald Albright – alto sax solo (4, 9)
- Valerie King – flute (11)
- George Bohanon – trombone (1, 11)
- Reggie Young – trombone (1, 5, 9, 11, 12, 14)
- Bill Reichenbach Jr. – trombone (5, 9, 12)
- Andy Martin – trombone (14)
- Ray Brown – trumpet (1, 11, 12, 14), flugelhorn solo (12), flugelhorn (14)
- Michael "Patches" Stewart – trumpet (1, 11, 14), flugelhorn (14)
- Gary Grant – trumpet (5, 9, 12)
- Jerry Hey – trumpet (5, 9, 12)
- Oscar Brashear – trumpet (14), flugelhorn (14)
- Tollak Ollestad – harmonica (12, 14)

Music arrangements

- Ray Brown – horn arrangements (1, 5, 14)
- Wayne Vaughn – horn arrangements (1)
- Maurice White – horn arrangements (1, 14)
- Jerry Hey – horn arrangements (5, 9, 12)
- Paul Klingberg – arrangements (6)
- Tim Kelley – arrangements (8)
- Benjamin Wright – horn arrangements (11)
- Myron McKinley – rhythm section arrangements (14)
- Tom Mgrdichian – string arrangements (14)

Background vocalists

- Gregory Curtis – backing vocals (1, 2, 4, 5, 9, 11, 16)
- Sheila Hutchinson – backing vocals (1, 4, 11)
- Howard McCrary – backing vocals (1, 11)
- Wanda Vaughn – backing vocals (1, 5, 11)
- Fred White – backing vocals (4, 12, 14)
- Angie Stone – lead vocals (5)
- Robert Brookins – backing vocals (5, 12)
- B. David Whitworth – backing vocals (5, 12)
- Krystal Johnson – backing vocals (8)

=== Production ===
- Ron Ellison – A&R direction
- Maurice White – executive producer, producer (1, 2, 4–9, 11, 13, 14, 16, 17)
- Philip Bailey – executive producer (8, 12)
- Wayne Vaughn – producer (1, 11)
- Preston Glass – producer (2, 3)
- Gregory Curtis – producer (4, 9, 16)
- Paul Klingberg – producer (7), additional production (13, 17)
- Bob Robinson – producer (8)
- Tim Young – producer (8)
- Robert Brookins – additional production (12)
- Ralph Johnson – producer (13)
- Herb Powell – A&R coordinator
- Richard Salvato – production coordination, management
- ja:Morito Suzuki – cover design
- K.C. Blinn – art direction
- Art Macnow – management

Technical credits

- Steve Hall – mastering at Future Disc (Hollywood, California)
- Dexter Simmons – mixing (1, 2, 16)
- Paul Klingberg – mixing (3–7, 9–15, 17)
- Tim Kelley – mixing (8)
- Cameron Marcarelli – recording, assistant engineer
- Gregory Curtis – additional recording
- Dave Dolimar – additional recording
- Andrew Haller – additional recording
- Will Mercer – additional recording
- Wayne Vaughn – additional recording
- Jason Carson – assistant engineer
- Dmitar Krijnac – assistant engineer

== Charts ==
Weekly chart performance for The Promise
Chart (2003)	Peak position
Japanese Album (Oricon)	115
US Billboard 200	89
US Independent Albums (Billboard)	5
US Top R&B/Hip-Hop Albums (Billboard)	19
