= Hold Me (Earth, Wind & Fire song) =

Single by Earth, Wind & Fire

from the album The Promise
- Released: 2003
- Genre: R&B
- Label: Kalimba Music
- Songwriter: Bob Robinson, Tim Kelley
- Producers: Maurice White (exec.); Phillip Bailey (exec.); Bob Robinson, Tim Kelley

Earth, Wind & Fire singles chronology
"All in the Way" (2003)	"Hold Me" (2003)	"Show Me the Way" (2004)

"Hold Me" is a song by the band Earth, Wind & Fire, released as a single in 2003 by Kalimba Music. The single peaked at No. 28 on the Billboard Adult R&B Songs chart.

== Overview ==
"Hold Me" was executively produced by Maurice White and Phillip Bailey. It was produced and composed by Bob Robinson and Tim Kelley for the band's 2003 studio album The Promise.

== Accolades ==
"Hold Me" was Grammy nominated in the category of Best Traditional R&B Vocal Performance.

== Personnel ==
- Lead vocals – Maurice White, Philip Bailey
- Backing vocals - Krystal Johnson
- Guitar – Bob Robinson
- Keyboards, drum programming, bass, drums – Tim Kelley
- Arranged by Tim Kelley
- Composed by Bob Robinson, Tim Kelley
- Executive Producers – Maurice White, Philip Bailey
- Producers – Bob Robinson, Tim Kelley
