= Earth, Wind & Fire: Live by Request =

Video by Earth, Wind & Fire
- Released: February 26, 2002
- Genre: R&B
- Length: 60:32
- Label: Sony
- Director: Lawrence Jordan

Earth, Wind & Fire chronology
Shining Stars: The Official Story Of Earth, Wind & Fire (2001)	Earth, Wind & Fire: Live by Request (2002)	Earth, Wind & Fire: Live at Montreux 1997 (2004)

Earth, Wind & Fire: Live by Request is a DVD released by the band Earth, Wind & Fire on February 26, 2002 by Sony Music. This DVD showcases the band's appearance, during July 17, 1999 on A&E's live concert series Live by Request.

== Set list ==
1. "Shining Star"
2. "Fantasy"
3. "Let's Groove"
4. "Devotion"
5. "September"
6. "Sing a Song"
7. "Reasons"
8. "Boogie Wonderland"
9. "That's the Way of the World"
10. "Mighty Mighty"
11. "Got to Get You into My Life"
12. "After the Love Has Gone"
13. "Getaway"
14. "In the Stone"
15. "I'll Write a Song for You"
16. "Serpentine Fire"
17. "Keep Your Head to the Sky" (bonus section)
