= Why? (Earth, Wind & Fire song) =

2015 song by Earth, Wind & Fire

Single by Earth, Wind & Fire

from the album The Promise
- Released: March 2015
- Genre: R&B
- Label: Kalimba Music
- Songwriters: Maurice White, Gregory Curtis
- Producers: Maurice White, Gregory Curtis

Earth, Wind & Fire singles chronology
"Never" (2014)	"Why?" (2015)

"Why?" is a song by the band Earth, Wind & Fire, released as a single in 2015 by Kalimba Music. The single peaked at No. 19 on the Billboard Smooth Jazz Songs chart.

== Overview ==
"Why?" was produced and written by Maurice White and Gregory Curtis. The song also came from EW&F's 2003 studio album The Promise.

== Appearances in other media ==
Why? appeared on the soundtrack of the 2002 feature film The Adventures of Pluto Nash.

== Critical reception ==
Chairman Mao of Blender called Why? a "sweeping ballad". Renee Graham of the Boston Globe said Maurice White's "voice is steady and sweet especially on the uptempo ballad, Why".

== Credits ==
- Alto Saxophone – Gerald Albright
- Percussion – Paulinho Da Costa
- Backing Vocals – Fred White, Gregory Curtis, Sheila Hutchinson, Wanda Vaughn
- Bass – Verdine White
- Composer - Maurice White, Gregory Curtis
- Engineer – Cameron Marcarelli
- Guitar - Darrell Crooks
- Keyboards, Drum Programming – Gregory Curtis
- Lead Vocals - Maurice White
- Producer - Maurice White, Gregory Curtis
