= The Classic Christmas Album (Earth, Wind & Fire album) =

Studio album by Earth, Wind & Fire
- Released: October 23, 2015
- Genre: Holiday, R&B
- Length: 67:21
- Label: Legacy
- Producer: Philip Bailey, Myron McKinley, Maurice White

Earth, Wind & Fire chronology
Holiday (2014)	The Classic Christmas Album (2015)	Gold (2020)

The Classic Christmas Album is an expanded reissue of Earth, Wind & Fire's 21st studio album, Holiday, released in 2015 by Sony/Legacy. The album reached No. 34 on the Billboard Top R&B/Hip Hop Albums chart and No. 18 on the Billboard Top R&B Albums chart.

== Critical reception ==
Professional ratings
Review scores
Source	Rating
Robert Christgau	(favourable)
Blogcritics	(favourable)

The album received favourable reviews from critics. Music critic Robert Christgau exclaimed "Why the hell not?"

== Track listing ==
No.	Title	Writer(s)	Length
1.	"Joy to the World"	Isaac Watts	4:12
2.	"Happy Seasons"	Verdine White, Philip Bailey, Larry Dunn, Maurice White, Al McKay	3:58
3.	"O Come All Ye Faithfull"	John Francis Wade, John Reading	6:06
4.	"Winter Wonderland"	Felix Bernard, Richard B. Smith	3:40
5.	"What Child Is This?"	William Chatterton Dix	3:34
6.	"Away in a Manger"	James Ramses Murray	2:54
7.	"The Little Drummer Boy"	Katherine K. Davis	2:50
8.	"Every Day Is Like Christmas"	Roxanne Seeman, Philipp Steinke	3:26
9.	"The First Noël"	Traditional	4:26
10.	"Sleigh Ride"	Leroy Anderson, Mitchell Parish	2:56
11.	"Snow"	Traditional Japanese	2:31
12.	"Jingle Bell Rock"	Joe Beal, Jim Boothe	3:09
13.	"December"	Maurice White, McKay, Allee Willis	3:40
14.	"Gather Round"	Maurice White, David Foster, Philip Bailey	3:38
15.	"Get Your Hump On This Christmas" (featuring Cleveland Brown)		2:42
16.	"I Asked for a Miracle (God Gave You Me)" (featuring Full Force, Philip Bailey)		4:47
17.	"Open Your Heart to Love" (featuring Maurice White)		4:33
18.	"One World"		4:19
Total length:			67:21

== Track information ==
"Gather Round" was originally released on the compilation Sounds of the Season: The NBC Holiday Collection in 2005.

"Get Your Hump On This Christmas" was released as a single in 2009, and featured in The Cleveland Show episode "A Cleveland Brown Christmas", aired on December 13, 2009.

"I Asked for a Miracle (God Gave You Me)" was recorded in 1991, and featured on the 2007 Full Force album Legendary.

"Open Your Heart to Love" was originally released on the compilation 'Tis The Season in 1997.

"One World" was originally released on the compilation Music Speaks Louder Than Words in 1990.
