= Touch (Earth, Wind & Fire song) =

Single by Earth, Wind & Fire

from the album Electric Universe
- B-side: "Sweet Sassy Lady"
- Released: January 1984
- Recorded: 1983
- Studio: The Complex Studios, West Los Angeles, CA
- Genre: R&B
- Length: 4:54
- Label: Columbia
- Songwriter(s): Jon Lind, Martin Page
- Producer(s): Maurice White

Earth, Wind & Fire singles chronology
| ""Magnetic" (1983) | "Touch" (1984) | "Moonwalk" (1984) |

"Touch" is a song by R&B/funk band Earth, Wind & Fire, released as a single in January 1984 by Columbia Records. The song reached No. 23 on the US Billboard Hot R&B Singles chart and No. 36 on the US Billboard Adult Contemporary Songs chart.

== Overview ==
"Touch" was produced by Maurice White and composed by Jon Lind with Martin Page. With a duration of four minutes and fifty four seconds, the song has a tempo of 99 bpm.

The single's B-side is "Sweet Sassy Lady". Both "Touch" and "Sweet Sassy Lady" appear on the band's 1983 album Electric Universe.

== Critical reception ==
Harry Sumrall of the San Jose Mercury-News remarked Touch "sways about to a mild dance beat, with those glorious vocals of White and Phillip Bailey plucking at the emotional strings". Pam Lambert of The Wall Street Journal wrote "vocals, driven ahead by the force of the bass guitar, also carry the..Motowny Touch." Cashbox stated "songs like 'Sweet Sassy Lady' and 'Touch' make their point with popping bass lines and electronic keyboard riffs very much in vogue with today's music." Prentis Rogers of The Atlanta Journal-Constitution said the song has a "mellow, upbeat nature." Paul Bennett of the Times Colonist wrote "The group's specialty of shifting harmonies comes forward especially on Touch". Phyl Garland of Stereo Review called the song "pleasantly listenable". Billboard proclaimed that "Touch" has "the gorgeous production values of 'Magnetic' applied to a midtempo ballad". Charles Schaar Murray of NME noted that "EWF contrive, as ever, to spice up one of their least distinguished ditties with good noises and here some discreet deployment of kalimba and funde drum serve to cushion the disappointment." Lennox Samuels of the Dallas Morning News also declared "particularly" Touch is "characterized by mellow overtures."

== Charts ==
| Chart (1984) | Peak position |
|---|---|
| US Adult Contemporary (Billboard) | 36 |
| US Hot Black Singles (Billboard) | 23 |
| US Top R&B Singles (Cashbox) | 30 |
