= Faces (Earth, Wind & Fire album) =

Studio album by Earth, Wind & Fire
- Released: October 14, 1980
- Recorded: March–July 1980
- Studios: ARC (Los Angeles, California); AIR (Salem, Montserrat); Davlen (North Hollywood, California); George Massenburg Studios (Los Angeles, California); Royce Hall (Los Angeles, California); Filmways/Heider Recording (Hollywood, California)
- Genres: R&B; pop; funk; post-disco
- Length: 65:34
- Label: ARC/Columbia
- Producer: Maurice White

Earth, Wind & Fire chronology
I Am (1979)	Faces (1980)	Raise! (1981)

Singles from Faces
- 1. "Let Me Talk" Released: August 1980; 2. "You" Released: November 1980; 3. "Back on the Road" Released: November 1980; 4. "And Love Goes On" Released: January 1981

Faces is the tenth studio album by the American band Earth, Wind & Fire released on October 14, 1980, on ARC/Columbia Records. The album reached number 10 on the Billboard Top LPs chart, number 2 on the Billboard Top Soul albums chart and number 10 on the UK Albums Chart. Faces was certified Gold in the US by the RIAA.

== Overview ==
Faces was partly recorded in the Caribbean island of Montserrat and produced by EWF leader Maurice White.

Artists such as Fred Wesley and Toto's Steve Lukather guested on the album. This would also be guitarist Al McKay's last album with the band.

When asked in a 2007 interview which Earth, Wind & Fire album is his favorite, White replied, "...probably Faces, because we were really in tune." White also went on to proclaim that on the LP EWF were "playing together and it gave us the opportunity to explore new areas".

== Singles ==
The track, "Let Me Talk", reached No. 8 on the Billboard R&B Singles chart and No. 29 on the UK Pop Singles chart. The song, "You", peaked at Nos. 10 and 30 on the Billboard R&B Singles and Adult Contemporary charts, respectively. A third single, "And Love Goes On", reached No. 15 on the Billboard R&B Singles chart.

== Critical reception ==
Professional ratings
Review scores
Source	Rating
AllMusic	3/5 stars
Chicago Sun Times	3/4 stars
Robert Christgau	C+
DownBeat	3/5 stars
Record Mirror	3/5 stars
Rolling Stone	2/5 stars
Smash Hits	8/10

Dennis Hunt of the Los Angeles Times declared that "Faces is the R&B album of the year." Hunt added "Faces is expertly written, produced and performed and is considerably better than any of this year's hardcore R&B albums. Just about every song on Faces, which is nearly all upbeat, is high quality. Its danceability rating is as high as any you'll find on an album in this post-disco era." Alan Morrison of DownBeat said that Faces "offer(s) an invaluable lesson in pop and jazz orchestration and production techniques. As a treasure trove of the imaginative technical resources available to the modern pop musician, EW&F’s productions continue to be state-of-the-art." Nelson George of Musician stated: "Faces re-affirms EW&F's role as the world's finest progressive soul band. While not an innovative work, the beauty of Faces is the band's feeling of renewed vigour and spirit, qualities that separate them from the many other good self-contained black bands."

Sal Caputo of the Gannett News Service said, "Minus Earth Wind and Fire's peace, love and happiness hype, this is a very good dance album by a tight ensemble which occasionally wanders too far into pretension. The two-record set contains spots of jazz, classic-rhythm and blues harmonies, Latin rhythms, modern funk, rock and soul all mixed together in an attempt to create a sort of "world" music." Paul Sexton of Record Mirror gave three out of five stars, stating "they're burning hot enough, but maybe the wind's all blowing in the same old direction". Phyl Garland of Stereo Review wrote that "Earth Wind & Fire's new release, the two -disc set Faces, has all the impact of a live volcano, but, unlike natural eruptions, this one is carefully controlled and every stunning effect is meticulously calculated." She added "all these forces might have gotten in each other's way and produced a monstrously cluttered set, but the way White has choreographed them everything fits together so well that the listener need only sit (or lie) back and enjoy."

Alan Niester of The Globe and Mail exclaimed: "Maurice White might not be the genius some people think he is, but at least he's a master of his craft, and Faces is another well-honed piece of musical excitement.". Richard Williams of The Times wrote: "Earth, Wind & Fire are arguably the most popular soul band in the world and Faces, following the enormous successes of All n' All and I Am, will certainly reach their unusually broad market. The mixture is familiar: reassuringly melodic songs delivered by the outstanding falsetto of Philip Bailey and the plainer tenor of Maurice White with creamingly opulent arrangements featuring a hair-trigger rhythm section and flashy horns. Faces, is however, a two-record set and for all the brilliance of the playing and recording it is hard to sustain deep interest over the distance." Paul Willistein of The Morning Call wrote that "this group's latest two-record set of 15 exceptional funk, R&B and fusion numbers is simply exhilarating".

Elise Bretton of High Fidelity wrote: "Soul disco like April in Paris cannot be reprised. And when it is transcribed, no matter how accurately, no pianist I know would want to tackle all those syncopated eight and sixteenth notes while singing in the funky, get down style that makes Earth, Wind & Fire the nation's No. 1 nonet." Bev Hillier of Smash Hits gave an 8 out of 10 rating and remarked "Their repertoire ranges from dreamy ballads through funk with a capital F, with numerous other styles incorporated en route. Every member's contribution is vital but Verdine White's bass in particular takes direct control of the feet and the horn section make Dexys sound like the Pied Piper. If you think disco's faceless, you ain't heard this".

Jim Arundel of Melody Maker praised the album, writing: "Earth, Wind &Fire's Faces is fascinating." Gary Bradford of The Pittsburgh Press exclaimed "Faces gets excessive in places, but Earth, Wind and Fire keep a strong afro-groove running". With three out of four stars Chuck Pratt of the Chicago Sun Times exclaimed "this fine funk soul group puts its best face forward on this ambitious and generous double pocket set of intricately produced, high gloss funk".

Isaac Hayes called Faces one of Earth, Wind & Fire's five essential recordings. Music journalist Mike Freedberg also named Faces in his ballot for The Village Voice's 1980 Pazz & Jop critics poll.

=== Accolades ===
Publication	Country	Accolade	Year	Rank
Soultracks	U.S.	The 75 Best Soul Albums of the 80s	2009	29

== Track listing ==
=== Original release ===
Side one
No.	Title	Writer(s)	Length
1.	"Let Me Talk"	Philip Bailey; Larry Dunn; Ralph Johnson; Al McKay; Maurice White; Verdine White	4:09
2.	"Turn It Into Something Good"	Valerie Carter; James Newton Howard; M. White	4:10
3.	"Pride"	Bailey; Dunn; McKay; Fred White; M. White; V. White	4:11
4.	"You"	David Foster; Brenda Russell; M. White	5:10

Side two
No.	Title	Writer(s)	Length
5.	"Sparkle"	Bailey; Eduardo del Barrio; M. White	3:50
6.	"Back on the Road"	McKay; M. White	3:33
7.	"Song in My Heart"	Garry Glenn; Russell; M. White	4:17
8.	"You Went Away"	Bailey; Ross Vannelli	4:24

Side three
No.	Title	Writer(s)	Length
9.	"And Love Goes On"	Dunn; Foster; Russell; M. White; V. White	4:05
10.	"Sailaway"	Bailey; del Barrio; Roxanne Seeman; M. White	4:37
11.	"Take It to the Sky"	Dunn; Glenn; M. White	3:50
12.	"Win or Lose"	Jean Hancock; Jerry Peters	3:53

Side four
No.	Title	Writer(s)	Length
13.	"Share Your Love"	Glenn; M. White	3:17
14.	"In Time"	Arlene Matza; Howard McCrary; M. White	4:13
15.	"Faces"	Bailey; Dunn; M. White; V. White	8:02
Total length:			60:37

=== 2010 reissue bonus tracks ===
No.	Title	Writer(s)	Length
1.	"Let Me Talk" (12" Long Version)	Bailey; Dunn; Johnson; McKay; M. White; V. White	6:45
2.	"You" (Alternative mix)	Foster; Russell; M. White	3:47
3.	"And Love Goes On" (Alternative mix)	Dunn; Foster; Russell; M. White; V. White	3:38
Total length:			14:10

=== Columbia Masters reissue ===
Side one
No.	Title	Writer(s)	Length
1.	"Let Me Talk"	Bailey; Dunn; Johnson; McKay; M. White; V. White	4:09
2.	"Turn It Into Something Good"	Carter; Howard; M. White	4:10
3.	"Pride"	Bailey; Dunn; McKay; F. White; M. White; V. White	4:11
4.	"You"	Foster; Russell; M. White	5:10

Side two
No.	Title	Writer(s)	Length
5.	"Sparkle"	Bailey; del Barrio; M. White	3:50
6.	"Back on the Road"	McKay; M. White	3:33
7.	"Song in My Heart"	Glenn; Russell; M. White	4:17
8.	"You Went Away"	Bailey; Vannelli	4:24

Side three
No.	Title	Writer(s)	Length
9.	"And Love Goes On"	Dunn; Foster; Russell; M. White; V. White	4:05
10.	"Sailaway"	Bailey; del Barrio; Seeman; M. White	4:37
11.	"Take It to the Sky"	Dunn; Glenn; M. White	3:50
12.	"Win or Lose"	Hancock; Peters	3:53

Side four
No.	Title	Writer(s)	Length
13.	"Share Your Love"	Glenn; M. White	3:17
14.	"In Time"	Matza; McCrary; M. White	3:47
15.	"Oriental (interlude)"	Matza; McCrary; M. White	0:27
16.	"Faces"	Bailey; Dunn; M. White; V. White	7:38
17.	"Pipe Organ (interlude)"	Bailey; Dunn; M. White; V. White	0:25
Total length:			59:58

== Personnel ==
=== Earth, Wind & Fire ===
- Philip Bailey – lead vocals, backing vocals, congas, percussion
- Maurice White – lead vocals, backing vocals, drums, kalimba
- Larry Dunn – acoustic piano, synthesizers, synthesizer programming
- Johnny Graham – guitars, guitar solo (11)
- Al McKay – guitars
- Verdine White – bass
- Fred White – drums, percussion
- Ralph Johnson – percussion

EWF horns

- Don Myrick – alto saxophone, baritone saxophone, tenor saxophone, sax solo (4, 15)
- Andrew Woolfolk – tenor saxophone
- Louis Satterfield – trombone, trombone solo (10)
- Rahmlee Michael Davis – trumpet, flugelhorn, trumpet solo (15)

=== Additional musicians ===
- David Foster – keyboards
- Garry Glenn – keyboards
- Jerry Peters – keyboards, organ
- Marlo Henderson – guitars
- Steve Lukather – guitars, guitar solo (6, 8)
- Paulinho da Costa – percussion
- Gary Coleman – orchestra bells
- Jeff Clayton – saxophones (uncredited)

Additional horns

- Jerry Hey – arrangements (1–4, 7, 9, 14, 15)
- Tom "Tom Tom 84" Washington – arrangements (5, 6, 8, 11–13)
- Erich Bulling – arrangements (8, 10)
- Fred Jackson Jr. and Larry Williams – flutes, saxophones
- George Bohanon, Bill Reichenbach Jr. and Fred Wesley – trombone
- Oscar Brashear, Bobby Bryant, Chuck Findley, Gary Grant, Michael Harris, Jerry Hey, Steve Madaio and Nolan Smith – trumpet
- Tommy Johnson – tuba
- Vincent DeRosa, Art Maebe, George Price, Alan Robinson and Marylin Robinson – French horn

Strings

- David Foster – arrangements (1, 4, 7, 9, 14, 15)
- James Newton Howard – arrangements (2)
- Tom "Tom Tom 84" Washington – arrangements (5, 6, 8, 11–13)
- Erich Bulling – arrangements (8, 10)
- Jerry Peters – arrangements (12)
- Assa Drori, Harris Goldman and Janice Gower – concertmasters
- Ronald Cooper, Larry Corbett, Nina Deveritch, Albert Gill, Dennis Karmazyn, Ray Kelley, Jacqueline Lustgarten, Earl Madison, Miguel Martinez, Nils Oliver, Frederick Sekorya, Marston Smith and Mary Louise Zeyen – cello
- Buell Neidlinger – double bass
- Dorothy Ashby – harp
- Marilyn Baker, Brenton Banks, Rollice Dale, Allan Harshman, Harry Hymas, Roland Kato, Renita Koven, Patricia Matthews, Gareth Nuttycombe, Jimbo Ross, David Schwartz, Bryana Sherman, Leanna Sherman, Ron Strauss, Barbara Thomason, Herschel Wise and Laury Woods – viola
- Mark Cargill, Norman Carr, Rob Clark, Isabelle Daskoff, Glenn Dicterow, Harold Dicterow, Assa Drori, Robert Dubow, Pavel Farkas, Henry Ferber, Ronald Folsom, Irving Geller, Harris Goldman, Joseph Goodman, Jack Gootkin, Janice Gower, Endre Granat, William Henderson, Reginald Hill, Karen Jones, Robert Jung, Gina Kronstadt, Bernard Kundell, William Kurasch, Janet Lakatos, Marvin Limonick, Robert Lipsett, Mary Lundquist, Joy Lyle, Michael Markman, Michael Nowak, Sid Page, Donald Palmer, Jerome Reisler, Henry Roth, Sheldon Sanov, Sid Sharp, Arkady Shindelman, Joseph Shoenbrun, Haim Shtrum, Barry Socher, Vicki Sylvester, Mari Tsumura, Jerome Webster, John Wittenberg and Shari Zippert – violin

Production

- Maurice White – producer
- Ken Fowler – recording, mixing
- George Massenburg – recording, mixing
- Franklin Allen – engineer
- Jeff Borgesen – engineer
- Ray Gonzales – engineer
- Geoff Irons – engineer
- Steve Jackson – engineer
- George Morgan – engineer
- Reuben – engineer
- Ron Pendragon – engineer
- Ernie Sheesley – engineer
- John Silcott – engineer
- Tchad Thompson – engineer
- Mark Touhy – engineer
- Robert Wolstein – engineer
- Mike Reese – mastering at The Mastering Lab (Hollywood, California)
- Roger Carpenter – art direction, design
- Jim Wood – typographic design
- Kathy Knowles – casting
- Francie Moore – photographic stylist
- Jim Shea – outside cover photography, poster photography
- Bruce Talamon – inside cover photography
- C. Ness – photography assistant
- Kenvin Lyman – photo light illustration

== Charts ==
=== Weekly charts ===
Year	Chart	Position
1980	U.S. Billboard Top Soul Albums	2
1980	U.S. Billboard 200	10
1980	UK Pop Albums chart	10
1980	Dutch Albums (Dutch Album Top 100)	8
1980	Norwegian Albums (VG-Lista	15
1980	Sweden Albums (Veckolista Album)	23
1980	New Zealand Albums Chart	40
1980	German Albums (Offizielle Top 100)	46

=== Singles ===
Singles
Year	Single	Chart	Position
1980	"Let Me Talk"	U.S. Billboard Hot Soul Singles	8
1980	"Let Me Talk"	U.S. Billboard Hot Dance Club Play	85
1980	"Let Me Talk"	U.S. Billboard Hot 100	44
1980	"Let Me Talk"	UK Pop Singles	29
1980	"You"	U.S. Billboard Hot 100	48
1980	"You"	U.S. Billboard Hot Soul Singles	10
1980	"You"	U.S. Billboard Adult Contemporary	30
1981	"And Love Goes On"	N.L. Dutch Single Top 100	25
1981	"And Love Goes On"	U.S. Billboard Hot Soul Singles	15
1981	"And Love Goes On"	B.E. Belgian Singles (Ultratop 50 Singles)	26
1981	"And Love Goes On"	U.S. Billboard Hot Dance Club Play	57
1981	"And Love Goes On"	U.S. Billboard Hot 100	59

== Certifications ==
Region	Certification	Certified units/sales
Japan	—	52,950
United States (RIAA)	Gold	500,000^{^}
^{^} Shipments figures based on certification alone.
