= Wanna Be with You =

Single by Earth, Wind & Fire

from the album Raise!
- B-side: "Kalimba Tree Instrumental" (US) "My Love" (UK)
- Released: December 1981
- Recorded: May 1981
- Genre: R&B
- Length: 4:41
- Label: ARC/Columbia
- Songwriters: Maurice White; Wayne Vaughn
- Producer: Maurice White

Earth, Wind & Fire singles chronology
"Let's Groove" (1981)	"Wanna Be with You" (1981)	"I've Had Enough" (1982)

"Wanna Be with You" is a song by R&B band Earth, Wind & Fire issued as a single in December 1981 by ARC/Columbia Records. The single rose to No. 15 on the US Billboard Hot Soul Singles chart, No. 7 on the UK Blues & Soul Top British Soul Singles chart and No. 40 on the RPM Canadian Pop Singles Chart.

== Overview ==
"Wanna Be with You" was produced by Maurice White and composed by White with Wayne Vaughn. The single's US b-side was an instrumental of an interlude called Kalimba Tree with its UK b-side being a song called My Love. Wanna Be With You, Kalimba Tree and My Love came from EWF's 1981 studio album Raise!.

== Critical reception ==
Don Palmer of Musician proclaimed that "Wanna Be with You" is a relaxed shuffle bump boogie based around a ten note piano vamp. The handclaps provide a solid back beat while the horns and altered vocal yelps exclaim the obvious". Tim de Lisle of Smash Hits called Wanna Be with You "a pleasant surprise, an excellent melody given a fresh jazzy treatment.

"Wanna Be with You" won a Grammy Award in the category of Best R&B Performance by a Duo or Group with Vocals.

== Covers ==
Wanna Be with You was covered by the jazz group Urban Knights on their 1995 album Urban Knights I.

== Personnel ==
- Writing - Maurice White, Wayne Vaughn
- Producer - Maurice White
- Assistant producer - Larry Dunn, Verdine White
- Programmer - Larry Dunn
- Arranger - Jerry Hey

=== Engineers ===
- Assistant engineer - Tom Perry
- Mixing engineer - Mick Guzauski, Tom Perry
- Recording engineer - Ken Fowler, Mick Guzauski, Ron Pendragon

== Chart positions ==
Chart (1982)	Peak position
U.S. Billboard Hot Soul Singles	15
U.S. Cashbox Top R&B Singles	17
UK Blues & Soul Top British Soul Singles	7
RPM Canadian Top Singles Chart	40
U.S. Billboard Hot 100	51
