= Tamiko =

Tamiko is a feminine Japanese given name. In Kanji, it is written 民子, meaning "child of the people". It can also be written 多美子, meaning "many, beauty, child", hence "child of many beauties". Notable people with the name include:

- Tamiko Butler (born 1991), Antiguan cyclist
- Tamiko Jones (born 1945), American singer
- Tamiko Nash (born 1979), American actress
- Tamiko Thiel (born 1957), American artist
- Tamiko Yasui (born 1942), Japanese fencer

== Middle name ==
- Baby Pozzi (Maria Tamiko Pozzi; born 1963), Italian former pornographic actress
- Sophie Tamiko Oda (born 1991), Japanese-American actress

== Fictional characters ==
- Tamiko Ridley fictional character from the animated show Inside job

== See also ==
- A Girl Named Tamiko, film
