= John Abbey (producer) =

British record label owner and producer

John Ernest Abbey (born 8 July 1945) is a British-born record label owner, record producer, music agent and writer, who has been based in the United States since the 1970s.

== Biography ==
He was born in London. In 1966 he founded the magazine initially called Home of the Blues, but soon renamed as Blues & Soul. The magazine became the leading black music journal in the UK, and Abbey remained its editor until the late 1970s.

Abbey founded music label Action Records in London in 1968, and specialist soul music label Contempo Records in 1973. 57 singles and 12 LP's were issued as Action Records. Contempo Records also operated as a small speciality record store from its headquarters at 42 Hanway Street in central London, which became known as an early source of American soul music for British customers. Both labels licensed R&B recordings from independent US labels for release in the UK. Contempo had hits with Tami Lynn's "I'm Gonna Run Away From You", and Dorothy Moore's "Misty Blue" and "Funny How Time Slips Away".

Abbey also worked as European A&R and promotions manager for Atlantic and Stax Records, promoting such artists as Aretha Franklin, Isaac Hayes and the Staple Singers to British and European audiences.

He married singer Tamiko Jones in 1977, and moved to Atlanta, Georgia, in 1978. He set up international tours for musicians including Curtis Mayfield and Clarence Carter. Abbey and Jones later divorced, and Abbey married Nina Easton, who had worked for CBS in Scandinavia. The pair established Ichiban Records in Atlanta in 1985, with a roster that expanded from soul music into blues, gospel, rock and hip-hop. Ichiban closed in the late 1990s.

After closing Ichiban Records, Abbey focused on arranging tours and promoting music to international audiences. He worked with a Japanese company to bring American artists such as Ben E. King to Japan. He also studied accounting and law. Abbey later managed The Three Degrees. In 2015, he was appointed CEO of Connor Ray Music, based in Houston, Texas, responsible for artists including Trudy Lynn.
