= Let Me Talk =

Single by Earth, Wind & Fire

from the album Faces
- B-side: "Let Me Talk" (Instrumental)
- Released: August 1980
- Recorded: 1980
- Genre: Funk; R&B; post-disco
- Length: 4:08 (Album version); 3:45 (7" version); 4:26 (7" instrumental version); 6:40 (12" version)
- Label: ARC, Columbia
- Songwriters: Maurice White; Ralph Johnson; Phillip Bailey; Larry Dunn; Al McKay; Verdine White
- Producer: Maurice White

Earth, Wind & Fire singles chronology
"Can't Let Go" (1979)	"Let Me Talk" (1980)	"You" (1980)

Music video
- "Let Me Talk" on YouTube

"Let Me Talk" is a song by American band Earth, Wind & Fire, released in August 1980 by ARC/Columbia Records as the first single from their tenth album, Faces (1980). It reached No. 8 on the US Billboard Hot R&B Singles chart and No. 29 on the UK Pop Singles chart.

== Overview ==
Let Me Talk was produced by EWF leader Maurice White. As well the song was composed by White, Ralph Johnson, Phillip Bailey, Larry Dunn, Al McKay and Verdine White.

The B-side of the single was an instrumental version of Let Me Talk. The song has an allegro tempo of 112 beats per minute. Let Me Talk also came off EWF's 1980 album Faces.

== Music video ==
With a duration of four minutes, a music video to accompany the single, was released in September 1980.

== Critical reception ==
Paul Rambali of NME found that the song is "without a recognisable disco beat. Just goes to show that modern soul music is alive and kicking harder at conformity than its recently revived predecessor. Let Me Talk commits the usual Earth, Wind & Fire crime of spoiling the funk with some Vegas showtime horn arrangements, but these are thankfully at a minimum and entirely outweighed by an irresistible riff". Rambali added "This record gives off such a compulsive, joyous, frenzied noise that it's hard to sit still and type, but I can't resist pointing out that amongst more than a few lyrical platitudes it contains the sharpest admonishment of modern culture you're likely to hear from any source. Earth, Wind & Fire narrow it down to just one line, pointing the finger to people who Try to find excitement in the labels that they wear! And that doesn't just mean the labels in clothes, either." Robert Christgau of the Village Voice said "Let Me Talk," is too political in its fluffy way to break down the racism to today's top 40". Mike Nicholls of Record Mirror declared the song "sets off at a punishing pace which is never relinquished. That means it'll be fine for those wishing to slip a disc in discos but home relaxation? Only if you've got shares in Valium. Positively frantic dahling".

Alan Morrison of DownBeat praised the song saying Let Me Talk "feature(s) the band at its churning best. EW&F excels at string funk as well as horn funk; when they get it all together with cleverly programmed synthesizer funk, as in Talk, the result is overwhelming. It also contains one of the few lyrics on the album that really communicates something beyond the catchwords "love." "space" and "vibrations": "We're all the same, with different names/Will you play your role, just as you're told?" Nelson George of Musician proclaimed "Let Me Talk is in the tradition of distinctive singles like Shining Star, Serpentine Fire and Getaway. Opening with a swirl of Larry Dunn's synthesizer and Al McKay's chucky rhythm guitar, it shifts effortlessly between two grooves while presenting an aggressive lyric filled with references to inflation, Arab oil and the pseudo-chic (trying to find excitement in the labels that you wear) articulated by Maurice White's husky baritone. Gary Bradford of The Pittsburgh Press called the song "searing funk". David Hepworth of Smash Hits exclaimed "Earth, Wind & Fire come over like a warm breeze of simple pleasure, spraying their champagne jazz all over the place and grabbing your heart feet first. This, I have decided, is because there isn't a manjack in that band who isn't hopelessly in love with the sound his instrument makes. More power to them." Paul Willistein of The Morning Call called the song an "enjoyable, though sometimes preachy tune, calling for universal brotherhood". What's more Patrick MacDonald of the Seattle Times described Let Me Talk as a "good tune".

"Let Me Talk" also received an honourable mention from NME in their top singles list of 1980.

== Charts ==
Chart (1980)	Peak position
Finland (Suomen virallinen lista)	29
UK Singles (OCC)	29
UK Top British Soul Singles (Blues & Soul)	26
US Billboard Hot 100	44
US Hot Dance Club Play (Billboard)	85
US Hot Soul Singles (Billboard)	8
US R&B Singles (Cash Box)	10
