= Kyle, West Virginia =

Kyle
- Unincorporated community
- Location within the state of West Virginia Kyle (the United States)
- Coordinates: 37°24′29″N 81°25′32″W
- Country: United States
- State: West Virginia
- County: McDowell
- Elevation: 1,775 ft (541 m)
- Time zone: UTC-5 (Eastern (EST))
  - Summer (DST): UTC-4 (EDT)
- ZIP code: 24855
- Area codes: 304 & 681
- GNIS feature ID: 1554898

Kyle is an unincorporated community in McDowell County, West Virginia, United States. Kyle is along U.S. Route 52, 1 mile (1.6 km) southeast of Northfork. Kyle has a post office with ZIP code 24855.

The community was named after Jim Kyle, a railroad promoter.
