= Back on the Road (Earth, Wind & Fire song) =

Single by Earth, Wind & Fire

from the album Faces
- B-side: "Take It to the Sky"
- Released: 1980
- Recorded: 1980
- Genre: Funk; rock; R&B
- Length: 3:33
- Label: Columbia
- Songwriter(s): Al McKay and Maurice White
- Producer(s): Maurice White

Earth, Wind & Fire singles chronology
"You" (1980)	"Back on the Road" (1980)	"And Love Goes On" (1981)

"Back on the Road " is a single for R&B/funk band Earth, Wind & Fire that was written by Al McKay and the band's leader Maurice White. Released from their studio album Faces, it was a moderate hit on the UK charts rising to no. 68.

== Overview ==
"Back On the Road" was produced by Maurice White. Guitarist Steve Lukather from Toto also featured on the song.

The b-side of the single was a song called "Take It to the Sky". "Take It to the Sky" and "Back on the Road" also came upon EWF's 1980 album Faces.

== Critical reception ==
Nelson George of Musician wrote "Among the album's other pleasures are..Steve Lukather's melodic rock guitar on Back on the Road.

== Covers ==
Jazz drummer Billy Cobham covered the single's b-side "Take It to the Sky" on his 1982 album Observations & Reflections.

== Chart positions ==
Chart (1980)	Peak position
UK Singles Chart	63
