= Magnetic (Earth, Wind & Fire song) =

Single by Earth, Wind & Fire

from the album Electric Universe
- B-side: "The Speed of Love"
- Released: November 1983
- Recorded: 1983
- Studio: The Complex Studios, West Los Angeles, CA
- Genre: Synth-pop; R&B
- Length: 3:45 (single version); 4:19 (album version)
- Label: Columbia
- Songwriter: Martin Page
- Producer: Maurice White

Earth, Wind & Fire singles chronology
"Spread Your Love" (1983)	"Magnetic" (1983)	"Touch" (1983)

Music video
- "Magnetic" on YouTube

"Magnetic" is a song by American band Earth, Wind & Fire, released in November 1983 on Columbia Records as the first single from their thirteenth studio album, Electric Universe (1983). It reached No. 10 on the US Billboard Hot R&B Singles chart, No. 36 on the Billboard Dance Club Play chart and No. 23 on the UK Blues & Soul Top British Soul Singles chart. "Magnetic" also reached No. 16 on the Belgian Pop Singles chart and No. 18 on the Dutch Pop Singles chart.

== Overview ==
"Magnetic" was written by Martin Page and produced by Maurice White for Kalimba Productions. The song is four minutes and twenty one seconds long with an allegro tempo at 141 beats per minute.

"Magnetic" is from Earth, Wind & Fire's 1983 studio album Electric Universe. The single's B-side is "The Speed of Love", a track from the album Powerlight, released earlier that year.

During December 1983, "Magnetic"'s accompanying music video was issued by Columbia. Charlie Jane Anders of io9 proclaimed that "of all the neon-dystopia music videos that came out after Blade Runner, my favorite is probably 1983's "Magnetic" by Earth Wind & Fire".

== Critical reception ==
Pam Lambert of The Wall Street Journal proclaimed "vocals, driven ahead by the force of the bass guitar, also carry the charged single Magnetic." Prentis Rogers of the Atlanta Journal-Constitution acclaimed "the catchy hooks of magnetic". Cash Box wrote "This elemental aggregation has been yo-yo-ing on the charts of late, and this preview track from the forthcoming 'Electric Universe' LP bursts with a fresh, energetic dance verve that ought to re-solidify their star stature. White is unshy about bringing a hot electric guitar into the mix, and its presence is reinforced by the repeated line, 'Don't break the circuit'. Human contact is the thrust here, as the band’s new approach provides a modern street and dance floor soundtrack." Billboard declared that "a densely layered arrangement billows around hard edged group vocals and driving rhythm" on Magnetic." The magazine also stated "EWF continues to keep abreast of the newest sounds without compromising its musical identity". Harry Sumrall of the San Jose Mercury-News noted on Magnetic a "clank, bump and shudder along with theme lines that are popish and dance funky".

Paul Willistein of The Morning Call said "EW&F leaves behind the cosmic subject matter, the usual arrangements and harmonies and gets physic(s)al with its dance/funk hit Magnetic". Willistein added "with Magnetic, EW&F using a techno funk mix and lyrics that are, well downright earthy, has produced one of the most exciting cuts of its long career". Paul Bursche of Number One called Magnetic "A fiery uptempo working". Lennox Samuels of The Dallas Morning News found that "High Priest Maurice White effectively blends lyrics of love and concerns of the nuclear age on 'Spirit of a New World' and 'Magnetic', using a musical strategy that includes sythesizer settings and handclaps". Robert Palmer of The New York Times proclaimed that "the rich vocal harmonies and lapidary pop craftsmanship listeners have learned to expect from Earth, Wind & Fire are still in evidence, but the group's instrumental sound has been radically stripped down and rethought."

Music critic Robert Christgau of The Village Voice also placed the song at number 20 on his dean's list of 1983.

== Credits ==
- Producer: Maurice White
- Composer: Martin Page
- Saxophone: Andrew Woolfolk
- Guitar: Roland Bautista
- Drums & percussion: Fred White
- Percussion: Ralph Johnson
- Bass: Verdine White
- Piano, keyboards, synth: Larry Dunn
- Background vocals: Pamela Hutchinson, Wanda Hutchinson, Bernard “Beloyd” Taylor, Philip Bailey & Maurice White
- Lead vocals: Philip Bailey & Maurice White

== Accolades ==
Year	Country	Publication	Accolade	Rank
1983	US	Village Voice	Dean's List	20

== Charts ==
Chart (1983–1984)	Peak position
Belgium (Ultratop 50 Singles)	16
Finland (Suomen virallinen lista)	25
Netherlands (Dutch Top 40)	10
Netherlands (Dutch Single Top 100)	18
UK Singles Chart	92
UK Top British Soul Singles (Blues & Soul)	23
US Billboard Hot 100	57
US Hot R&B Singles (Billboard)	10
US Hot Dance Club Play (Billboard)	36
US Top R&B Singles (Cash Box)	13
