= And Love Goes On =

Single by Earth, Wind & Fire

from the album Faces
- B-side: "Win or Lose" (US) "Faces" (UK)
- Released: January 1981
- Recorded: 1980
- Genre: Disco, R&B
- Length: 4:05
- Label: ARC/Columbia
- Songwriters: David Foster; Larry Dunn; Brenda Russell; Verdine White; Maurice White
- Producer: Maurice White

Earth, Wind & Fire singles chronology
"Back on the Road" (1980)	"And Love Goes On" (1981)	"Let's Groove" (1981)

"And Love Goes On" is a single by the American R&B band Earth, Wind & Fire released in January 1981 by ARC/Columbia Records. The single got to No. 15 on both the US Billboard Hot R&B Singles and UK Blues & Soul Top British Soul Singles charts. "And Love Goes On" also reached No. 25 on the Dutch Pop Singles chart and No. 26 on the Belgian Pop Singles chart.

== Overview ==
And Love Goes On was produced by Maurice White. The song was also composed by White, David Foster, Larry Dunn, Brenda Russell and Verdine White.

The b-side of this single was a song called "Win or Lose." Both "And Love Goes On" and Win or Lose came upon EWF's 1980 studio album Faces.

== Critical reception ==
New Musical Express proclaimed "And Love Goes On is a very good record indeed." Jason Elias of Allmusic called And Love Goes On a "splashy track" and noted that "Maurice White's vocal is flawless here; it doesn't really matter what platitudes o' love he's pushing here. Given the song's odd melody, vocalist Phillip Bailey's multi tracked backing vocals are particularly sparkling". Sal Caputo of the Gannett News Service described the tune as "a syrupy love song that's redeemed by its lack of pretension". Paul Willistein of The Morning Call called And Love Goes On "pure EWF, characterized by White's whispery vocals and the band's percussive, Latin midtempo style". Billboard also described the song as an "uptempo track highlighted by a fluid vocal, percussive beat and accumulated with a tasty arrangement".

== Chart positions ==
Year	Chart	Peak position
1981	U.S. Billboard Hot R&B Singles	15
1981	U.S. Cashbox Top R&B Singles	18
1981	UK Blues & Soul Top British Soul Singles	15
1981	N.L. Dutch Single Top 100	25
1981	B.E. Belgian Singles (Ultratop 50 Singles)	26
1981	U.S. Billboard Hot 100	59
1981	U.S. Billboard Hot Dance Club Play	57
