= Raise! =

Studio album by Earth, Wind & Fire
- Released: October 23, 1981
- Recorded: May–September 1981
- Studios: ARC/George Massenburg Studio (Los Angeles, California), Sunset Sounds Recording Studio (Los Angeles, California)
- Genres: R&B; soul; funk; post-disco
- Length: 38:08
- Label: ARC/Columbia
- Producer: Maurice White

Earth, Wind & Fire chronology
| Faces (1980) | Raise! (1981) | Powerlight (1983) |

Singles from Raise!
- 1. "Let's Groove" Released: September 1981; 2. "Wanna Be with You" Released: December 1981; 3. "I've Had Enough" Released: January 1982

Back cover
- The back cover of Raise!

Raise! is the eleventh studio album by the American band Earth, Wind & Fire, released in October 1981, by ARC/Columbia Records. The album spent 11 weeks atop the Billboard Top R&B albums chart and peaked at No. 5 on the Billboard 200 chart. Raise! has been certified Platinum in the US by the RIAA, Gold in the UK by the BPI and Gold in Canada by Music Canada.

== Production ==
The album art was designed by Roger Carpenter and Raise! was illustrated by Shusei Nagaoka. The front cover of Raise! features a presumed female Black Egyptian figure. The name of the band is present on the front cover, but the title is not.

On the back cover there is an illustration of a female figure in a sarcophagus, which is also divided into a purple left side and a blue right side. The sarcophagus appears to be hyper-modern. The title of the album is presented in the top left corner of the back cover.

Raise! was produced by bandleader Maurice White. The album marked the return of rhythm guitarist Roland Bautista, who last played on 1972's Last Days and Time. The LP was also reissued in 2015 with seven bonus tracks.

== Singles ==
Off the album came the single "Let's Groove", which reached No. 1 on the Billboard Hot R&B Singles chart and No. 3 on the Billboard Hot 100 chart. The song "I've Had Enough" peaked at No. 29 on the UK Pop Singles chart.

Another song entitled "Wanna Be with You" rose to No. 15 on the Billboard Hot Soul Singles chart. "Wanna Be with You" also won a Grammy for Best R&B Vocal Performance by a Duo or Group.

== Critical reception ==
Professional ratings
Review scores
| Source | Rating |
|---|---|
| AllMusic | 2/5 stars |
| LA Weekly | B− |
| The Philadelphia Inquirer | 3/5 stars |
| Record Mirror | 4/5 stars |
| Rolling Stone | 4/5 stars |
| Smash Hits | 7/10 |
| The Village Voice | B+ |

The Philadelphia Inquirer gave a 3/5 star rating, stating "And while there are no surprises here, the group offers another session of class music, fortified by strong melodies and appealing lyrics. The skilled blend of classic funk and mainstream values guarantees wide acceptance for this release. The groups shifts nicely from mellow ballads such as 'My Love' to upbeat material such as 'Let's Groove'." With a 7/10 rating Fred Dellar of Smash Hits found that "White's production is impeccable; the vocals float and flare, the horns urge you onto the dance-floor and the rhythms make you stay there". Hugh Wyatt of the New York Daily News described the LP as "a real gem". With a 4/5 stars rating Ken Tucker of Rolling Stone said "With each new album, Earth, Wind and Fire remain relatively true to their original sound: elaborate, neatly orchestral funk, influenced equally by American and African sources. But the band also keeps its ear to the radio. Accordingly, Raise! reflects the current wave of street-gritty black pop, from Lakeside to Rick James. Most of the tracks crank up the bass and feature rattling percussion that scrapes against the beat." Tucker added "On Raise!, White’s romanticism is slinkier, more seductive." With a four out of five stars rating Alan Coulthard of Record Mirror found that Raise! "sizzles from start to finish". People exclaimed EW&F's "New Age songs are ingenious sonic tapestries that blend tribal chants, zesty horns, brilliantly varied percussion, funky-flavored guitar rhythms and 2001-ish synthesizer sounds. Here an instrumental called Kalimba Tree melds into the LP's best cut, You Are a Winner, which has White's lead vocals bobbing and weaving with Philip Bailey's. The lyrics are mostly power-of-positive-thinking messages that might thrill Norman Vincent Peale but are no match for the music’s complexity."

Richard Williams of The Times wrote "Paring away the overachievement of Faces, EW&F return to something like their best form". Variety noted that "breathtaking production and a perscussive, non stop fusion of funk and rock power light up the entire album". Barney Hoskyns of NME said "Raise! is a thundering collection of the best noises around, urgent, controlled and meticulously glossy. Horns pump and spurt in golden ecstasy, percussion stamps and cracks through the usual mass of nibbling guitars and synthesizers, and White's voice is as strong and soaring as ever". The Village Voice's Robert Christgau proclaimed EWF "turn their sparkling harmonies and powerful groove into a pure, contentless display of virtuosity". J.D. Considine of the Baltimore Sun wrote, "Raise! puts Earth, Wind & Fire back on the rock and roll road".

Mitchell Feldman of the Atlanta Journal Constitution placed Raise! upon his own list of 1981's best albums. Music critic Nelson George also placed Raise! in his ballot for the 1981 Village Voice Pazz and Jop poll.

== Track listing ==
Side one
| No. | Title | Writer(s) | Length |
|---|---|---|---|
| 1. | "Let's Groove" | Wayne Vaughn, Maurice White | 5:37 |
| 2. | "Lady Sun" | Bernard "Beloyd" Taylor | 3:39 |
| 3. | "My Love" | Wayne Vaughn, Maurice White | 4:35 |
| 4. | "Evolution Orange" | David Foster, Nan O'Byrne, M. White | 4:37 |

Side two
| No. | Title | Writer(s) | Length |
|---|---|---|---|
| 5. | "Kalimba Tree" | Maurice White, Verdine White, Jerry Hey | 0:25 |
| 6. | "You Are a Winner" | Beloyd Taylor | 4:09 |
| 7. | "I've Had Enough" | Philip Bailey, Greg Phillinganes, Brenda Russell | 4:36 |
| 8. | "Wanna Be with You" | Wayne Vaughn, Maurice White | 4:36 |
| 9. | "The Changing Times" | Beloyd Taylor, Wayne Vaughn, Maurice White | 5:54 |

2015 expanded version bonus tracks
| No. | Title | Writer(s) | Length |
|---|---|---|---|
| 10. | "Wanna Be with You" (single version) | Wayne Vaughn, Maurice White | 3:58 |
| 11. | "Kalimba Tree" (12" long version) | Jerry Hey, M. White | 3:49 |
| 12. | "Let's Groove" (special remixed holiday version) | Wayne Vaughn, Maurice White | 6:44 |
| 13. | "Let's Groove" (single version) | Wayne Vaughn, Maurice White | 4:07 |
| 14. | "Let's Groove" (instrumental) | Wayne Vaughn, Maurice White | 4:01 |
| 15. | "I've Had Enough" (7" version) | Philip Bailey, Greg Phillinganes, Brenda Russell | 3:53 |
| 16. | "The Changing Times" (7" version) | Beloyd Taylor | 4:45 |

== Personnel ==
=== Earth, Wind and Fire ===
- Maurice White – lead vocals, backing vocals, kalimba, drums
- Philip Bailey – lead vocals, backing vocals, percussion
- Larry Dunn – acoustic piano, synthesizers, synthesizer programming
- Roland Bautista – guitars, guitar solos
- Johnny Graham – guitars
- Verdine White – bass guitar, additional backing vocals
- Fred White – drums, percussion
- Ralph Johnson – percussion, additional backing vocals
- Andrew Woolfolk – tenor saxophone

The Phenix Horns

- Don Myrick – alto saxophone, tenor saxophone, sax solos
- Louis Satterfield – trombone, trombone solos
- Rahmlee Michael Davis – trumpet
- Michael Harris – trumpet

=== Additional musicians ===
- Michael Boddicker – synthesizers, vocoder
- David Foster – keyboards
- Bill Meyers – keyboards
- Greg Phillinganes – keyboards
- Wayne Vaughn – keyboards
- Marlo Henderson – guitars
- Beloyd Taylor – guitars, additional backing vocals
- Paulinho da Costa – percussion
- Wanda "Ms. Pluto" Vaughn – additional backing vocals

Additional horns

- Bill Meyers – arrangements (1, 3, 7)
- Jerry Hey – arrangements (2, 4, 6, 8, 9)
- Tom Saviano – saxophones
- George Bohanon, Dick Hyde, Charles Loper, Lew McCreary and Bill Reichenbach Jr. – trombone
- Oscar Brashear, Chuck Findley, Gary Grant, Larry G. Hall and Jerry Hey – trumpet

Strings

- Bill Meyers – arrangements (1, 3, 7)
- David Foster – arrangements (4)
- Assa Drori and James Getzoff – concertmasters
- Selene Burford, Larry Corbett, Paula Hochhalter, Jerome Kessler, Frederick Seykora and Mary Louise Zeyen – cello
- Alan DeVeritch, Pamela Goldsmith, Allan Harshman, Virginia Majewski and Gareth Nuttycombe – viola
- Arnold Belnick, Denyse Buffum, Thomas Buffum, Henry Ferber, Ronald Folsom, Irving Geller, Endre Granat, Reginald Hill, William Hymanson, Myra Kestenbaum, William Kurasch, Betty LaMagna, Brian Leonard, Norman Leonard, Marvin Limonick, Jerome Reisler, Nathan Ross, Sheldon Sanov, Anton Sen, Arkady Shindelman, Haim Shtrum, Mari Tsumura-Botnick and John Wittenbert – violin

== Production ==
- Maurice White – original recording producer
- Philip Bailey – co-producer (7)
- Tony Calvert – reissue producer
- Ken Fowler – recording engineer
- Ron Pendragon – recording engineer
- Stephen McManus – assistant engineer
- Mick Guzauski – engineer (horn and string overdubs), mixing
- Tom Perry – engineer (vocal overdubs), mixing
- The Mastering Lab (Hollywood, California) – mastering location
- Larry Dunn – production assistant
- Verdine White – production assistant
- Roger Carpenter – art direction, design
- Shusei Nagaoka – illustration
- Cavallo, Ruffalo & Fargnoli – management

== Charts ==
Album
| Year | Chart | Position |
|---|---|---|
| 1981 | US Billboard Top Soul Albums | 1 |
| 1981 | US Billboard 200 | 5 |
| 1981 | Dutch Albums (Dutch Album Top 100) | 3 |
| 1981 | Finland (Suomen virallinen albumlista) | 5 |
| 1981 | Japanese Albums (Oricon) | 7 |
| 1981 | Sweden Albums (Veckolista Album) | 9 |
| 1981 | UK Pop Albums | 11 |
| 1981 | Norwegian Albums (VG-lista) | 18 |
| 1981 | Canada RPM 50 Albums | 25 |
| 1981 | German Albums (Offizielle Top 100) | 30 |
| 1982 | New Zealand Albums Chart | 19 |

Singles
| Year | Single | Chart | Position |
|---|---|---|---|
| 1981 | "Let's Groove/I've Had Enough" | US Billboard Dance Club Songs | 3 |
| 1981 | "Let's Groove" | US Billboard Hot Soul Songs | 1 |
| 1981 | "Let's Groove" | US Billboard Hot 100 | 3 |
| 1981 | "Let's Groove" | UK Pop Singles | 3 |
| 1981 | "Let's Groove" | Dutch Singles (Dutch Single Top 100) | 5 |
| 1981 | "Let's Groove" | Belgian Singles (Ultratop 50 Singles) | 9 |
| 1982 | I've Had Enough" | UK Pop Singles | 29 |
| 1982 | "Wanna Be With You" | Billboard Hot Soul Songs | 15 |
| 1982 | "Wanna Be With You" | Billboard Hot 100 | 51 |

== Certifications ==
| Region | Certification | Certified units/sales |
|---|---|---|
| Canada (Music Canada) | Gold | 50,000^{^} |
| Japan | — | 291,610 |
| Netherlands (NVPI) | Gold | 50,000^{^} |
| Switzerland (IFPI Switzerland) | Gold | 25,000^{^} |
| United Kingdom (BPI) | Gold | 100,000^{^} |
| United States (RIAA) | Platinum | 1,000,000^{^} |
^{^} Shipments figures based on certification alone.

== Accolades ==
| Publication | Country | Accolade | Year | Rank |
|---|---|---|---|---|
| NME | United Kingdom | Albums of the Year | 1981 | 16 |
| The Village Voice | United States | Dean's List | 1981 | 49 |

== See also ==
- List of number-one R&B albums of 1981 (U.S.)
- List of number-one R&B albums of 1982 (U.S.)
- Billboard Year-End
