= Spread Your Love (Earth, Wind & Fire song) =

Single by Earth, Wind & Fire

from the album Powerlight
- B-side: "(US) Freedom Of Choice (EU) Hearts to Heart"
- Released: June 1983
- Recorded: 1982
- Genre: Pop; R&B
- Length: 3:51
- Label: Columbia
- Songwriter(s): Azar Lawrence; Beloyd Taylor; Maurice White
- Producer(s): Maurice White

Earth, Wind & Fire singles chronology
"Side by Side" (1983)	"Spread Your Love" (1983)	"Magnetic" (1983)

"Spread Your Love" is a song recorded by R&B/funk band Earth, Wind & Fire and released as a single in June 1983 by Columbia Records. The single reached No. 48 on the Dutch Pop Singles chart and No. 57 on the US Billboard Hot R&B Singles chart.

== Overview ==
"Spread Your Love" was produced by EWF bandleader Maurice White and composed by White, Azar Lawrence and Beloyd Taylor. The single's b-side was a tune called Hearts to Heart. Both songs came from Earth, Wind & Fire's 1983 studio album Powerlight.

== Critical reception ==
Chip Stern of Musician noted that "Robert Greenidge's slithery steel drums featured on the Eastern-tinged Spread Your Love". Craig Lytle of Allmusic proclaimed "the (song's) sonically aggressive special effects are contrasted with a soothing chanting chorus."

== Charts ==
Chart (1983)	Peak position
Dutch Pop Singles	48
US Billboard Hot R&B Singles	57
