= Powerlight =

Studio album by Earth, Wind & Fire
- Released: February 3, 1983
- Recorded: July–November 1982
- Studios: The Complex (Los Angeles); Ocean Way (Hollywood)
- Genres: R&B; funk; post-disco
- Length: 41:23
- Label: Columbia
- Producer: Maurice White

Earth, Wind & Fire chronology
Raise! (1981)	Powerlight (1983)	Electric Universe (1983)

Singles from Powerlight
- 1. "Fall in Love with Me" Released: January 1983; 2. "Side by Side" Released: April 1983; 3. "Spread Your Love" Released: June 1983

Powerlight is the twelfth studio album by American band Earth, Wind & Fire, released in February 1983 by Columbia Records. The album rose to No. 4 on the Billboard Top R&B Albums chart and No. 12 on the Billboard 200 chart. Powerlight was also certified Gold in the US by the RIAA.

== Overview ==
Powerlight was produced by EWF leader Maurice White. According to White the LP's title has to do with "the chakras -- the centers of the body that connect us with cosmic power." Artists such as Robert Greenidge, Maxayn Lewis and Zakir Hussain also appeared on the album.

== Singles ==
The album cut "Fall in Love with Me" rose to No. 17 on the Billboard Hot 100 chart and No. 4 on the Billboard Hot R&B Songs chart. "Fall in Love with Me" was also Grammy nominated for Best R&B Performance by a Duo or Group with Vocals.

"Side by Side" got to No. 15 on the Billboard Hot R&B Songs chart. "Straight from the Heart" was released as a single in the Netherlands.

== Critical reception ==
Professional ratings
Review scores
Source	Rating
AllMusic	4/5 stars
Knight Ridder	7/10
The Philadelphia Inquirer	3/5 stars
Rolling Stone	2/5 stars
Smash Hits	8/10
Stereo Review	(favourable)
The Village Voice	A−

Robert Palmer of The New York Times noted "Mr. (Milton) Nascimento, and Brazilian pop in general, combine African-derived rhythms that tend to be more flowing and buoyant than their North American funk counterparts with a melodious pop lyricism based on relatively complex, jazzy harmonies, and Maurice White has done something very similar on Earth, Wind and Fire's Powerlight album." Vanity Fair found that "Earth, Wind & Fire's oddysey of uplift, Powerlight is, impossible as it may seem, even more relentlessly cheerful than its predecessor Raise!, a concoction designed to do precisely that to listeners' spirit". Tony Prince of the Daily Mirror called Powerlight the album of the week exclaiming "The worst you can say about Earth, Wind & Fire are their high standards of arrangements are predictable. They just can't get any better!" Robert Christgau of The Village Voice proclaimed with an A− grade that "Their sonic affluence and showtime groove encompass whispering strings no less perfect than their JB guitar beats, Funkafunnies harmonies no less schmaltzy than their Lionel Richie homages, and when the synthesis is this catchy it's the best argument for universalism they'll ever make." Craig Lytle of AllMusic in a four out of 5 star review found "Many groups lose the steam that propelled them to the top; Earth, Wind & Fire, contemporary sound and all, were still blazing when this album was released." Lytle continued saying "Throughout the entire album, White's unifying message is fueled by the aggressive rhythms and relaxing melodies." Connie Johnson of the Los Angeles Times wrote that Powerlight "does show why EWF is one of the masters of studio pop." Johnson added that "EWF mostly keeps the rhetoric in check focusing instead on assertive rockers that give everyone in this nine-member unit a chance to flex his muscles There is less cosmic emphasis but the EWF formula—heavy on the richly textured vocals horns and rhythm—is still intact. And surprisingly still fresh."

With a 3 out of 5 stars rating, Ken Tucker of The Philadelphia Inquirer wrote "Earth, Wind and Fire's new collection of Utopian funk, "Powerlight" (Columbia), has a glossy sheen that manages to coat even the banal songs with a pretty surface that's pleasing." Rick Shefchik of Knight Ridder in a 7/10 review wrote, "The title suggests a further descent into hip spiritualism, but the record itself has all the elements of E,W&F's best work - punchy horns, clean riffs, hard dance rhythms and soaring group vocals." Chip Stern of Musician claimed "Powerlight stands both as a testament to White's absolute mastery of production and EW&F's renewed vigour as a band." Dave Marsh gave Powerlight 4 out of 5 stars and claimed that it's mostly "notable for the power of the playing." David Hepworth of Smash Hits gave the album an 8/10 rating and declared EWF are "firing on all cylinders." Hepworth added "They weld their massive sound together with such precision that their whole ensemble can provide a rhythm as spare and compulsive as a snapping finger, they write production numbers instead of songs and never allow the momentum to flag for a second, they're soppy as hell and, when they produce records like 'Powerlight', there's absolutely nothing wrong with that". Hugh Wyatt of the New York Daily News found "Earth, Wind & Fire gives new meaning to the word classy, and I like it".

Issac Hayes called Powerlight one of Earth, Wind & Fire's five essential recordings. Powerlight was also placed by music critic Robert Christgau of The Village Voice at No. 36 on his dean's list of 1983.

== Track listing ==
Side one
No.	Title	Writer(s)	Length
1.	"Fall in Love with Me"	Maurice White, Wayne Vaughn, Wanda Vaughn	5:54
2.	"Spread Your Love"	Maurice White, Beloyd Taylor, Azar Lawrence	3:51
3.	"Side by Side"	Maurice White, Wayne Vaughn, Wanda Vaughn	5:57
4.	"Straight from the Heart"	Philip Bailey, Eduardo del Barrio, Roxanne Seeman, Freddie Washington	4:42

Side two
No.	Title	Writer(s)	Length
5.	"The Speed of Love"	Maurice White, Wayne Vaughn, Wanda Vaughn, Tony Haynes	3:36
6.	"Freedom of Choice"	Maurice White, Beloyd Taylor, Azar Lawrence	4:10
7.	"Something Special"	Maurice White, Wayne Vaughn, Wanda Vaughn	4:23
8.	"Hearts to Heart"	Maurice White, Beloyd Taylor, Azar Lawrence	3:45
9.	"Miracles"	Maurice White, Eddie Del Barrio, Jon Lind, Mary D'Astgues	4:58

== Personnel ==
Earth, Wind & Fire

- Philip Bailey – lead vocals, backing vocals, percussion
- Maurice White – lead vocals, backing vocals, drums, kalimba
- Larry Dunn – acoustic piano, synthesizers, synthesizer programming
- Roland Bautista – guitars, guitar solo (6, 8)
- Verdine White – bass guitar
- Fred White – drums, percussion
- Ralph Johnson – percussion
- Andrew Woolfolk – tenor saxophone

Additional musicians

- Eddie del Barrio – keyboards
- George Del Barrio – keyboards
- Rick Kelly – keyboards
- Skip Scarborough – keyboards
- Wayne Vaughn – keyboards
- Azar Lawrence – Prophet-5
- Maxanne Lewis – acoustic piano
- Beloyd Taylor – guitars, backing vocals
- Paulinho da Costa – percussion
- Robert Greenidge – steel drums (3)
- Zakir Hussain – tabla
- Don Myrick – soprano sax solo (5)
- Wanda "Ms. Pluto" Vaughn – backing vocals

Horns

- Bill Meyers – arrangements (1, 2)
- Thomas "Tom Tom 84" Washington – arrangements (3)
- George Del Barrio – arrangements (4, 9)
- Jerry Hey – arrangements (6–9)
- Don Myrick – saxophones
- George Bohanon, Charles Loper, Lew McCreary, Bill Reichenbach Jr. and Louis Satterfield – trombone
- Oscar Brashear, Rahmlee Michael Davis, Chuck Findley, Gary Grant, Michael Harris and Jerry Hey – trumpet

Strings

- Bill Meyers – arrangements (1, 2)
- Tom Tom 84 – arrangements (3)
- George Del Barrio – arrangements (4, 9)
- Assa Drori and David Frisina – concertmasters
- Ronald Cooper, Larry Corbett, Douglas Davis, Suzie Katayama, Earl Madison and Frederick Seykora – cello
- Arni Egilsson – double bass
- Dorothy Remsen – harp
- Rollice Dale, Alan Deveritch, Pamela Goldsmith, Allan Harshman, Roland Kato, Milton Kestenbaum, Carole Mukogawa, David Schwartz, Joel Soultanian and Linn Subotnick – viola
- Brenton Banks, Myer Bello, Arnold Belnick, Harry Bluestone, Nicole Bush, Ron Clark, Bill Hybel, Anatol Kaminsky, George Kast, Janet Lakatos, Robert Lipsett, Karen Jones, Stanley Plummer, Nathan Ross, Bob Sanov, Sheldon Sanov, Haim Shtrum, Marshall Sosson, Robert Sushel, Pam Tompkins, Miwako Watanabe and Shari Zippert – violin

=== Production ===
- Maurice White – producer
- Mick Guzauski – recording, mixing
- Steve Crimmel – assistant engineer
- Robert Spano – assistant engineer
- Tom Perry – additional mixing
- Bernie Grundman – mastering at A&M Studios (Hollywood, California)
- Roger Carpenter – art direction
- Monte White – art direction, production staff
- Shusei Nagaoka – illustration
- Leonard Smith – production staff
- Geri White – production staff

== Charts and certifications ==
=== Charts ===
==== Albums ====
Year	Chart	Peak position
1983	US Top LPs & Tape	12
1983	US Top Soul LPs	4
1983	Sweden Albums (Veckolista Album)	2
1983	Dutch Albums Dutch Album Top 100	6
1983	Japanese Albums (Oricon)	6
1983	Norwegian Albums (VG-Lista)	7
1983	German Albums (Offizielle Top 100)	13
1983	UK Pop Albums	22
1983	CA RPM Canadian Pop Albums	24

==== Singles ====
Year	Single	Chart	Position
1983	"Fall in Love with Me"	US Hot R&B Singles	4
1983	"Fall in Love with Me"	US Dance Club Play	31
1983	"Fall in Love with Me"	US Hot 100	17
1983	"Fall in Love with Me"	CA RPM Canadian Pop Singles	14
1983	"Fall in Love with Me"	UK Pop Songs	47
1983	"Fall in Love with Me"	Blues & Soul Top British Soul Singles	20
1983	"Side by Side"	US Hot R&B Singles	15
1983	"Side by Side"	US Hot 100	76
1983	"Spread Your Love"	US Hot R&B Singles	57
1983	"Spread Your Love"	Dutch Singles	48

=== Certifications ===
Region	Certification	Certified units/sales
Japan	—	141,730
United States (RIAA)	Gold	500,000^{^}
^{^} Shipments figures based on certification alone.

== Accolades ==
Publication	Country	Accolade	Year	Rank
Village Voice	U.S	Dean's List	1983	36
