= Jupiter (Earth, Wind & Fire song) =

Single by Earth, Wind & Fire

from the album All 'N All
- B-side: "Runnin'"
- Released: April 1978
- Genre: R&B
- Length: 3:11 (single version); 3:55 (album version)
- Label: Columbia
- Songwriter(s): Maurice White; Verdine White; Larry Dunn; Phillip Bailey
- Producer(s): Maurice White

Earth, Wind & Fire singles chronology
"Fantasy" (1978)	"Jupiter" (1978)	"Magic Mind" (1978)

"Jupiter" is a song by the band Earth, Wind & Fire that was issued as a single in April 1978 on Columbia Records. The single rose to No. 26 on the UK Blues & Soul Top British Soul Singles chart and No. 41 on the UK Pop Singles chart.

== Overview ==
Jupiter was written by EWF leader Maurice White and Verdine White, Larry Dunn and Phillip Bailey. The single's b-side was a song called Runnin'. Both Jupiter and Runnin' came off the band's 1977 studio album All 'N All.

== Critical reception ==
Alex Henderson of Allmusic noted that on Jupiter EWF are "tearing into the hardest of funk".

== Chart positions ==
Year	Chart	Peak position
1978	UK Pop Singles	41
1978	UK Blues & Soul Top British Soul Singles	26
1978	N.L. Dutch Single Tip	24
