= Side by Side (Earth, Wind & Fire song) =

Single by Earth, Wind & Fire

from the album Powerlight
- B-side: "Something Special"
- Released: April 1983
- Recorded: 1982
- Genre: Electro; boogie; R&B; post-disco
- Length: 4:09 (single version); 5:57 (album version)
- Label: Columbia
- Songwriter(s): Wayne Vaughn; Wanda Vaughn; Maurice White
- Producer(s): Maurice White

Earth, Wind & Fire singles chronology
"Fall in Love with Me" (1982)	"Side by Side" (1983)	"Spread Your Love" (1983)

"Side by Side" is a song by the band Earth, Wind & Fire released as a single in April 1983 on Columbia Records. The song reached No. 15 on the Billboard R&B Singles chart.

== Overview ==
"Side by Side" was produced by Maurice White and composed by White, Wayne Vaughn and Wanda Vaughn of The Emotions. The single is four minutes and nine seconds long with a tempo of adante moderato at 104 beats per minute.

The B-side of the single is the song "Something Special" which also appears on the album Powerlight.

== Critical reception ==
Joel Elias of Allmusic called Side by Side a "lush and romantic song". He also noted "For a group that was always known for their maverick spirit, steel drums, and Tom 84's horn and string arrangements, that makes this sound like EWF but even more adventurous, eclectic, and sensual." Cashbox proclaimed that "EWF honcho Maurice White blends his band's signature sound with strings and adds a dash of steel drums to cook up this midtempo ballad". Chip Stern of Musician noted that "Robert Greenidge's slithery steel drums featured on..the gospel-y Side by Side".

Billboard described the song as a "blending of jazz vocals and chords in the funk of a rhythm ballad". Cash Box described it as blending the "band’s hot signature sound with strings and...a dash of steel drums"

== Samples ==
"Side by Side" was sampled by Common on the track "Charms Alarm", off his 1992 debut album Can I Borrow a Dollar?. British band Childhood also sampled "Side by Side" on their 2016 track "This Rendezvous". As well Something Special was sampled by Will Smith featuring Lisa "Left Eye" Lopes on the title track of Smith's 1997 album Big Willie Style.

== Credits ==
- Producer: Maurice White
- Composer: Wanda Hutchinson, Maurice White & Wayne Vaughn
- Lead Vocals: Maurice White
- Steel Drums: Robert Greenidge
- String Arrangement: Tom Tom 84
- Horn Arrangement: Tom Tom 84

== Charts ==
Chart (1983)
US Billboard Hot Black Singles	15
US Cashbox R&B Singles	15
