= I've Had Enough (Earth, Wind & Fire song) =

1982 single by Earth, Wind & Fire

Single by Earth, Wind & Fire

from the album Raise!
- B-side: "Kalimba Tree (Instrumental)"
- Released: January 1982 (UK)
- Recorded: 1981
- Genre: Post-disco
- Length: 4:36
- Label: Columbia
- Songwriters: Philip Bailey; Greg Phillinganes; Brenda Russell
- Producer: Maurice White

Earth, Wind & Fire singles chronology
"Wanna Be with You" (1982)	"I've Had Enough" (1982)	"Fall in Love with Me" (1982)

Live video
- "I've Had Enough" on YouTube

"I've Had Enough" is a single by the band Earth, Wind & Fire issued in January 1982 on Columbia Records. The song peaked at No. 29 on the UK Pop Singles chart.

== Overview ==
I've Had Enough was written by Philip Bailey, Greg Phillinganes and Brenda Russell. The song was included on the band's 1981 studio album Raise!.

== Critical reception ==
Barney Hoskyns of New Musical Express proclaimed "I've Had Enough is a perfect strike-out". Alan Coulthard of Record Mirror wrote "The other highlight is I've Had Enough, this set's successor to that pair of classics September and Fantasy. The intoxicating horn section and Philip Bailey's falsetto vocal transfer a song of unexceptional proportions into the realms of excellence". Guy-Manuel de Homem Christo of Daft Punk said in an interview that this is his favorite song.

== Samples ==
I've Had Enough was later sampled by German house producer and DJ Tonka in 1998 in his song "Security".

== Charts ==
Chart (1982)	Peak position
UK Pop Singles	29
