= You (Earth, Wind & Fire song) =

Single by Earth, Wind & Fire

from the album Faces
- B-side: "Share Your Love"
- Released: November 1980
- Recorded: 1980
- Genre: Funk; R&B
- Length: 3:56 (7" version); 5:09 (album version)
- Label: ARC/Columbia
- Songwriters: David Foster; Brenda Russell; Maurice White
- Producer: Maurice White

Earth, Wind & Fire singles chronology
"Let Me Talk" (1980)	"You" (1980)	"Back on the Road" (1980)

"You" is a song by the band Earth, Wind & Fire, released as a single in November 1980 on Columbia Records. The single reached No. 10 on the Billboard Hot Soul Singles chart and No. 30 on the Billboard Adult Contemporary chart.

== Overview ==
You was produced by Maurice White and composed by White, David Foster and Brenda Russell. The song also came upon EWF's 1980 album Faces.

== Critical reception ==
Billboard described the song as "a smooth ballad with lush strings and a tight production that make it appealing". Paul Sexton of Record Mirror called You an "After The Love Has Gone clone" Stephen Holden of Rolling Stone called You an example of "Bee Gees-influenced pop romanticism". Phyl Garland of Stereo Review also called "You, the (album's) standout." Garland went on to state that "You is every bit as good as After the Love Has Gone on I Am which is saying quite a lot".

== Cover versions ==
Jazz singer Nancy Wilson covered "You" on her 1983 album I'll Be a Song.

== Charts ==
Chart (1980–81)	Peak position
U.S. Billboard Hot 100	48
U.S. Billboard Hot Soul Singles	10
U.S. Billboard Adult Contemporary	30
U.S. Cashbox Top Soul Singles	10
