= Fall in Love with Me (song) =

"Fall In Love With Me"

Single by Earth, Wind & Fire

from the album Powerlight
- B-side: "Lady Sun"
- Released: January 21, 1983
- Recorded: 1982
- Genre: Electro; post-disco; boogie; R&B
- Length: 3:54 (single version); 5:54 (album version)
- Label: Columbia
- Songwriters: Wayne Vaughn; Wanda Vaughn; Maurice White
- Producer: Maurice White

Earth, Wind & Fire singles chronology
"I've Had Enough" (1982)	"Fall In Love With Me" (1983)	"Side by Side" (1983)

Music video
- "Fall in Love with Me" on YouTube

"Fall in Love with Me" is a song by American band Earth, Wind & Fire, released in January 1983 by Columbia Records as the first single from their twelfth album, Powerlight (1983). It rose to No. 4 on the US Billboard R&B Singles chart, No. 17 on the Billboard Hot 100 chart, and No. 14 on the Canadian RPM Top Singles chart. "Fall In Love With Me" was Grammy nominated for Best R&B Performance by a Duo or Group with Vocals.

== Overview ==
"Fall in Love with Me" was produced by Maurice White and composed by White, Wayne Vaughn, and Wanda Vaughn of The Emotions. As well the song came upon EWF's 1983 studio album Powerlight.

The single's b-side was a song called Lady Sun from EWF's 1981 studio album Raise!.

A music video was also released in 1983 to accompany the single.

== Critical reception ==
Dave Marsh of the Philadelphia Daily News exclaimed "Jimi Hendrix and Eric Clapton should get a hold of the solo Roland Bautista plays on Fall in Love with Me, which simply rips the song's already skyrocketing energy level to another dimension." Charles McCollum of the Hartford Courant found that "Fall in Love with Me -the set's new single - is particularly striking with a fine, quasi-scat vocal from (Maurice) White." Vanity Fair wrote "Fall in Love With Me, the single, is a classic disco throbber, with Maurice White inviting listeners to help yourself to all of me".

Connie Johnson of the Los Angeles Times noted that "Fall in Love with Me and The Speed of Love allow for scatty rude-boy vocals from (Maurice) White. They're also packed with the chiming, multilayered backup vocals and complex melodic development that are quintessential EWF." Christopher Connelly of Rolling Stone exclaimed "A bit of the grit that surfaced on Raise! gives 'Fall in Love with Me' a needed push". Chip Stern of Musician wrote "Fall in Love With Me featur(es) White's gruff but kindly midrange". Craig Lytle of AllMusic proclaimed that the song has "a festive rhythm and sauntering vocals".

== Charts ==
=== Weekly charts ===
Chart (1983)	Peak position
Belgium (Ultratop)	18
Canada Top Singles (RPM)	14
Finland (Suomen virallinen lista)	4
France (IFOP)	22
Netherlands (Dutch Top 40)	11
Netherlands (Dutch Single Top 100)	21
Sweden (Sverigetopplistan)	11
US Billboard Hot 100	17
US Hot Black Singles (Billboard)	4
US Hot Dance/Disco (Billboard)	31

=== Year-end charts ===
Year-end chart (1983)	Rank
US Top Pop Singles (Billboard)	100
