= Saturday Nite =

Single by Earth, Wind & Fire

from the album Spirit
- B-side: "Departure"
- Released: 1976
- Recorded: 1976
- Genre: R&B, funk
- Length: 4:03 (album version); 3:42 (7" Version)
- Label: Columbia
- Songwriter(s): Maurice White; Al McKay; Philip Bailey
- Producer(s): Maurice White

Earth, Wind & Fire singles chronology
"Getaway" (1976)	"Saturday Nite" (1976)	"On Your Face" (1977)

"Saturday Nite" is a song by R&B band Earth, Wind & Fire which was issued as a single in 1976 by Columbia Records. The song reached numbers 4 and 21 on Billboard Hot Soul Songs and Hot 100 charts, respectively. "Saturday Nite" also rose to No. 17 on the UK Singles chart - their first hit in the United Kingdom.

== Overview ==
"Saturday Nite" was written by Maurice White with Philip Bailey and Al McKay. The single's b-side is a tune called Departure. Both songs came from EWF's 1976 studio album Spirit.

== Critical reception ==
Blues and Soul called Saturday Nite a "gem". Cashbox noted that "shouting 1,2,3,4 - horns come wailing in followed by a snappy synthesizer. The vocals are full, the group utilizes a winning variety of vocal styles, funky and smooth". Music Week also described Saturday Nite as "easy-paced, and much more of a two hander, with the wonderful Maurice White..trading vocals with (Philip) Bailey, while the backing track is powerful and brassy." Record World said it is "in an uptempo groove that is fine for any nite."

== Samples ==
"Saturday Nite" was sampled by the Spice Girls on their 1996 single "Say You'll Be There".

== Chart positions ==
Chart (1976)	Peak position
US Billboard Hot 100	21
US Billboard Hot Soul Singles	4
UK Singles Chart	17
