= Phyllis T. Garland =

Black American writer and professor (1935–2006)

Phyllis "Phyl" T. Garland (1935 – November 7, 2006) was an academic, journalist and music critic known for her contributions to the formalization of arts journalism and for becoming the first Black and first female member of faculty to earn tenure at the Columbia University Graduate School of Journalism.

== Personal life ==
Phyllis Garland was born in McKeesport, Pennsylvania, in 1935. Her father was Percy Garland, one of the first Black men with a career in industrial photography, and her mother was Hazel Garland, the first African-American woman to serve as editor-in-chief of a nationally circulated newspaper chain.

Garland graduated from McKeesport High School in 1953. In 1987, she was made a charter member of the McKeesport High School's Hall of Fame.

Garland attended Northwestern University in Evanston, Illinois and studied in the Medill School of Journalism graduating in 1957 with a Bachelors of Science in Journalism.

Garland died from complications of cancer at Calvary Hospice in Brooklyn, New York on November 7, 2006 at age seventy-one and was buried at the McKeesport and Versailles Cemetery after a funeral service at the Bethlehem Baptist Church in McKeesport.

== Journalism career ==
Garland returned to McKeesport, Pennsylvania, and began working at the Pittsburgh Courier in 1957. She worked there as a reporter, and later as an editor, until 1965. During her employment at the Courier, Garland wrote about Black issues including the March on Washington, the Civil Rights Movement, and discrimination in housing, education and the arts, earning her a Golden Quill Award in 1962. Garland also became the first Black journalist to write a regular television column, called "Video Vignettes".

In 1965, Garland joined the Chicago staff of Ebony Magazine as a contributing editor and music critic. In 1969, she became the New York editor, serving until 1972. During this time, Garland also served as Director of Editorial Operations for Johnson Publishing Company in New York.

Garland was also a contributing editor to numerous other pop culture and music publications, such as the Stereo Review, where she wrote on Black pop music from 1978 to 1994.

== Education career ==
Garland was an assistant professor of Black Studies at the State University of New York at New Paltz from 1971 to 1973, during which she was also the acting Chairwoman of the Black Studies Department.

In 1973, Garland joined the faculty of Columbia University as an assistant professor in the Graduate School of Journalism. When she earned tenure in 1981, Garland became both the first Black faculty member and the first female faculty member of the Graduate School of Journalism. She taught courses on Cultural Affairs Reporting and Writing, and was an advisor to student Masters projects. She founded and was the administrator of the National Arts Journalism Program, which brought professional journalists to New York to study and write on the performing arts. Garland was known as a tenacious teacher, believing that the arts should be researched and reported as thoroughly and professionally as other traditional journalism subjects. Students and colleagues noted her deep love for Black music, referring to her very large personal jazz record collection and the listening parties she hosted at her apartment on 8th Street in Greenwich Village. In 2004, Garland retired from Columbia University.

== Publications ==
On June 1, 1969, Garland published The Sound of Soul: The Story of Black Music. She was hosted by Studs Terkel in a radio interview about the book on November 25, 1968, where they discussed the role of music in civil rights, the roles of Black churches in soul music, and other topics from the book.

In 1984, Garland published Michael: in Concert, With Friends, At Play, about the Black pop star Michael Jackson.

In 1989, Garland was a writer on the documentary film Adam Clayton Powell.

== Legacy and honors ==
In 1992, Garland received the Distinguished Achievement Award from the Black Musicians Conference.

In 1998, Garland was awarded an honorary doctorate of Human Letters from Point Park University in Pittsburgh, Pennsylvania, where she was a frequent guest lecturer.

She also served on the Board of Trustees for the Jazzmobile (New York), the Rhythm and Blues Foundation, the Michael Jackson and Janet Jackson Scholarship Funds, and the Modern School; and on the Advisory Board for the New York Association of Black Journalists.

After her death, the Columbia University Graduate School of Journalism renamed their scholarship from the Black Alumni Network Scholarship Fund, to the Black Alumni Network/Phyllis Garland Scholarship Fund, in 2007.
