= Kalimba Music =

Record label

- Founded: 1996
- Founder: Maurice White
- Status: Defunct
- Genre: R&B, jazz
- Country of origin: United States
- Location: Sherman Oaks, California
- Official website: www.kalimba-music.com

Kalimba Music was an American record label. The company was established in 1996 by musical artist Maurice White (frontman of Earth, Wind and Fire). Kalimba Records was based in Sherman Oaks, California.

== Overview ==
The record label was originally launched in 1996 as Kalimba Records and based in Santa Monica, California. During 2003 the label changed its title to Kalimba Music and moved to Sherman Oaks in Los Angeles. At the label is a recording studio known as Magnet Vision which's there from its inception. Kalimba Music has also featured Earth, Wind & Fire and jazz artists such as Paula Atherton and Adam Hawley upon its roster.
