= Getaway (Earth, Wind & Fire song) =

Single by Earth, Wind & Fire

from the album Spirit
- B-side: "Getaway (Instrumental)"
- Released: July 7, 1976
- Recorded: 1976
- Genre: R&B; funk; disco
- Length: 3:47
- Label: Columbia
- Songwriters: Bernard "Beloyd" Taylor, Peter Cor Belenky
- Producers: Maurice White, Charles Stepney

Earth, Wind & Fire singles chronology
"Can't Hide Love" (1976)	"Getaway" (1976)	"Saturday Nite" (1976)

"Getaway" is a song by R&B/funk band Earth, Wind & Fire, released in 1976 on Columbia Records as the first single from the band's seventh studio album Spirit. The song reached No. 1 on the Billboard Hot Soul Songs chart and No. 12 on the Billboard Hot 100 chart. "Getaway" also peaked at No. 12 on the Billboard Dance Singles charts. A remixed version appears on the soundtrack for Gran Turismo 4.

== Overview ==
"Getaway" was produced by Maurice White and Charles Stepney and composed by Beloyd Taylor and Peter Cor Belenky.

An instrumental version of "Getaway" was included as the single's B-side.

== Critical reception ==
Joe McEwen of Rolling Stone said "'Getaway', a current pop smash, is EWF at its best. The theme is in line with urban escapist classics like 'Up on the Roof' and 'World of Fantasy', with pyramid mumbo-jumbo temporarily laid aside. A propulsive funk track laced with dizzying changes makes the song one of the most sophisticated pop hits in recent memory". Record World said that "A tapestry of electronics and syncopated vocals provides an inertia that should send the song skyrocketing to the top." Ed Hogan of AllMusic described "Getaway" as a "fantastically frantic jam". He also noted that "listen to the opening horn blasts which could be termed assaultive if this wasn't such a cut as well as the earth-shaking energy that's released on the track, it's easily one of the band's most sensational sides." Music Week declared that the song "opens proceedings in fine style, with Philip Bailey's falsetto sweetening its funky rhythms".

== Chart history ==
Chart (1976–1977)	Peak position
Canada RPM Top Singles	29
U.S. Billboard Hot 100	12
U.S. Billboard Hot Dance Club Play	12
U.S. Billboard Hot Soul Singles	1

== Certifications ==
Region	Certification	Certified units/sales
United States (RIAA)	Gold	1,000,000^{^}
^{^} Shipments figures based on certification alone.

== Samples ==
- "Getaway" was sampled by Poor Righteous Teachers on the song "Strictly Ghetto".
- The song was also sampled by Papoose and Sheek Louch Featuring Busta Rhymes, Raekwon and Young Chris on the song "Power Cypher".
- It was also sampled on the Boards of Canada album Music Has the Right to Children, on the track "Sixtyten".
