= Wayne Vaughn =

- Born: June 6, 1953 (age 73)
- Genres: Soul; funk; R&B
- Occupations: Musician; singer; songwriter; record producer; arranger
- Instruments: Vocals; piano; keyboards
- Years active: 1978-present

Wayne Lee Vaughn is an American producer, keyboardist and arranger best known for his work with the band Earth, Wind & Fire. Vaughn has also worked with other preeminent artists such as the Brothers Johnson, Patti LaBelle, Jennifer Holliday, Troop and Terrace Martin.

== Biography ==
Wayne Vaughn was born and raised in Los Angeles, California. When he was nine years old he started playing the flute at primary school. At the age of 13, he began playing a piano which his parents had bought for him. After graduating from UCLA with a bachelor's degree in Music and Composition in 1976, he met Quincy Jones, the Brothers Johnson's producer. Vaughn eventually performed as a keyboardist on the Brothers Johnson's 1978 album Blam!. Blam has been certified platinum in the US by the RIAA.

During 1978, Vaughn met Maurice White, the leader of Earth, Wind & Fire. Within the next year, he collaborated with Aretha Franklin on her album La Diva and Patti LaBelle on her album It's Alright with Me. He eventually worked with Earth, Wind & Fire as a producer, composer and keyboardist on their 1981 LP Raise! and 1983 album Powerlight.

Vaughn later collaborated with Jennifer Holliday on her 1983 album Feel My Soul and Earth, Wind & Fire on their 1983 LP Electric Universe. Vaughn went on to perform on Maurice White's 1985 self-titled album and compose on Patrice Rushen's 1986 album Watch Out. He then collaborated with Earth, Wind & Fire on their 1987 LP Touch the World. Touch the World has been certified gold in the US by the RIAA.

Vaughn also worked with Vesta Williams on her 1988 album Vesta 4 U and Troop on their 1988 LP Troop. Troop has been certified gold in the US by the RIAA.

Vaughn went on to collaborate with Earth, Wind & Fire on their 2003 album The Promise and Terrace Martin on his 2016 LP Velvet Portraits.
