= Blues & Soul =

British music magazine

- Editor: Pete Lewis
- Categories: Music
- Publisher: Claire Tyler (Daniell)
- Founder: John Abbey
- Founded: 1966
- First issue: October 1967; 59 years ago
- Company: Blues & Soul Limited
- Country: United Kingdom
- Based in: Croydon
- Language: English
- Website: bluesandsoul.co.uk
- ISSN: 0959-6550

Blues & Soul is a British music magazine, established in 1967 by John Abbey. The Independent has noted Blues & Soul as being the equal of magazines such as NME and Q. Billboard magazine has called Blues & Soul "a respected publication."

As of 2024, Blues & Soul has published some 1100 issues and is still based in Croydon, London. The publisher is Blues & Soul Limited. It publishes five issues per year in both print and digital format, edited by Pete Lewis. The publisher has a growing online archive of back issues and images published by the magazine.

== History ==
John Abbey, a devotee of American R&B music, established a magazine entitled Home of the Blues in 1966. This came about while Abbey was working for a travel agency in London. The magazine went on to publish its own musical charts, cover events and clubs and feature reviews, interviews and other musical articles. Blues & Soul's R&B charts were compiled via a poll record sales throughout Britain. The publication soon gained further popularity in the UK and Europe covering genres of music such as soul, R&B, Funk, dance, jazz, hip hop, reggae and world music. With issue number 12 the magazine's title was changed to Blues & Soul.

In addition to Abbey's contributions, material was provided by writers such as former Motown press officer Sharon Davis and British soul fan Dave Godin. Within a June 1970 column of Blues & Soul, Godin went on to coin the term "Northern soul". The business gradually expanded and Abbey set up an associated record label called Contempo Records, which released the UK's first 12-inch singles. Abbey moved to Atlanta, Georgia in the mid-1970s and established Ichiban Records, while the editorship of the magazine was taken over by Bob Killbourn in 1979. Another important contributor, David Nathan, began writing for Blues & Soul in the early 1970s, first in London, then from 1975 as the magazine's principal New York correspondent.

Blues & Soul's charts, from the start of such, became increasingly popular within the UK. During 1979, DJ Pete Tong started being a journalist at Blues & Soul. Within the following year, he became the features editor of the magazine. Fellow UK publication Black Music was also absorbed in April 1984 by Blues & Soul. Blues & Soul has also, from its inception, bestowed awards to artistes based upon an annual readers poll.

By 2006, the magazine had published 1000 issues. The magazine returned in printed form in August 2010 with a special vintage edition.

In July 2011, Blues & Soul was relaunched as an in print twice-monthly magazine alongside its ongoing presence online, helmed by then editor Lee Tyler plus assistant editor (and long-time contributor) Pete Lewis.
