= The Eternal Vision =

Video by Earth, Wind & Fire
- Released: November 24, 1992
- Genre: R&B
- Length: 45 mins
- Language: English
- Label: Sony Music

Earth, Wind & Fire chronology
Earth, Wind & Fire: In Concert (1982)	The Eternal Vision (1992)	Live in Japan (1994)

The Eternal Vision is a compilation of music videos and live performances by the band Earth, Wind & Fire. The Eternal Vision was released on November 24, 1992, by Sony Music on VHS.

== Track listing ==
1. "Serpentine Fire"
2. "September"
3. "Boogie Wonderland"
4. "After The Love Has Gone (Live)"
5. "Let Me Talk"
6. "Let's Groove"
7. "Reasons (Live)"
8. "Fantasy (Live)"
9. "System of Survival"
10. "Thinking of You"
11. "Evil Roy"
12. "Wanna Be the Man"
