= List of awards and nominations received by Earth, Wind, & Fire =

Earth, Wind, & Fire awards and nominations
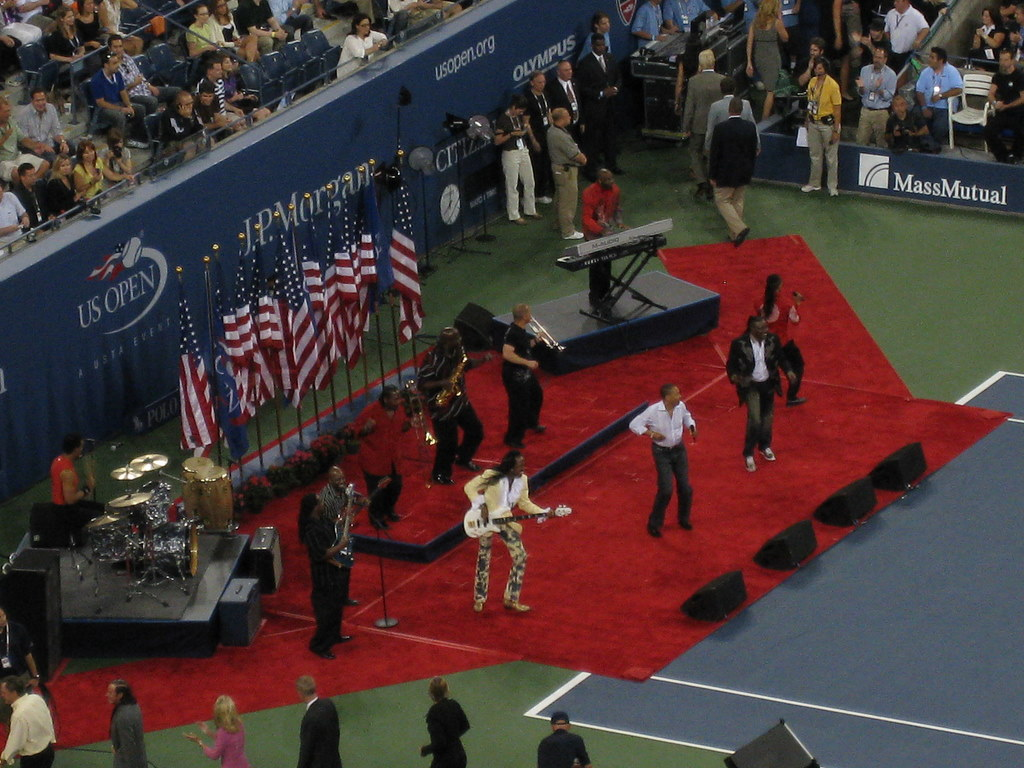
- Earth, Wind & Fire performing at the opening ceremony of the 2008 US Open on August 25, 2008
Awards and nominations
| Award | Wins | Nominations |
| American Music Awards | 4 | 12 |
| BET | 1 | 1 |
| Grammy | 7 | 19 |
| NAACP | 1 | 3 |
| Soul Train | 1 | 5 |

Totals (Note: Certain award groups do not simply award one winner. They acknowledge several different recipients, have runners-up, and have third place. Since this is a specific recognition and is different from losing an award, runner-up mentions are considered wins in this award tally. For simplification and to avoid errors, each award in this list has been presumed to have had a prior nomination.)
- Wins: 14
- Nominations: 40

This page includes the achievements, nominations and awards of the band Earth, Wind, & Fire.

Earth, Wind & Fire (EW&F or EWF) is an American musical group. Their style and sound span over various music genres such as jazz, R&B, soul, funk, disco, pop, Latin, and Afro-pop. They are among the best-selling music artists of all time, with sales of over 90 million records worldwide.

The band was formed in Chicago by Maurice White in 1969, growing out of the Salty Peppers. Prominent members have included Philip Bailey, Verdine White, Ralph Johnson, Larry Dunn, Al McKay, Roland Bautista, Robert Brookins, Sonny Emory, Fred Ravel, Ronnie Laws, Sheldon Reynolds and Andrew Woolfolk. The band is known for its kalimba sound, dynamic horn section, energetic and elaborate stage shows, and the contrast between Bailey's falsetto and Maurice's baritone.

The band has won 6 Grammys out of 17 nominations and four American Music Awards out of 12 nominations. They have been inducted into the Rock and Roll Hall of Fame, the Vocal Group Hall of Fame, the NAACP Image Award Hall of Fame, and Hollywood's Rockwalk, and earned a star on the Hollywood Walk of Fame. The band has received an ASCAP Rhythm & Soul Heritage Award, a BET Lifetime Achievement Award, a Soul Train Legend Award, a NARAS Signature Governor's Award, a Grammy Lifetime Achievement Award, the 2012 Congressional Horizon Award, and the Kennedy Center Honors in 2019. Rolling Stone has called them "innovative, precise yet sensual, calculated yet galvanizing" and declared that the band "changed the sound of black pop". VH1 has described EWF as "one of the greatest bands".

== American Music Awards ==
The American Music Awards is an annual awards ceremony created by Dick Clark in 1973. Earth, Wind, & Fire has won four awards from twelve nominations.

| Year | Nominee / work | Award | Result |
|---|---|---|---|
| 1975 | Earth, Wind, & Fire | Favorite Soul, R&B Band, Duo or Group | Won |
| 1975 | Earth, Wind, & Fire | Favorite Pop, Rock Band, Duo or Group | Nominated |
| 1975 | That's The Way Of The World | Favorite Soul/R&B Album | Nominated |
| 1976 | Earth, Wind, & Fire | Favorite Soul, R&B Band, Duo or Group | Won |
| 1976 | Earth, Wind, & Fire | Favorite Pop, Rock Band, Duo or Group | Nominated |
| 1976 | That's The Way Of The World | Favorite Soul/R&B Album | Nominated |
| 1976 | Spirit | Favorite Soul/R&B Album | Nominated |
| 1977 | Earth, Wind, & Fire | Favorite Soul, R&B Band, Duo or Group | Won |
| 1978 | Earth, Wind, & Fire | Favorite Soul, R&B Band, Duo or Group | Won |
| 1978 | All 'N All | Favorite Soul/R&B Album | Nominated |
| 1979 | Earth, Wind, & Fire | Favorite Soul, R&B Band, Duo or Group | Nominated |
| 1980 | Earth, Wind, & Fire | Favorite Soul, R&B Band, Duo or Group | Won |

== BET Awards ==
The BET Awards were established in 2001 by the Black Entertainment Television network to celebrate African Americans and other minorities in music, acting, sports, and other fields of entertainment over the past year. On June 25, 2002, Earth, Wind & Fire received the BET Lifetime Achievement Award.

| Year | Nominee / work | Award | Result |
|---|---|---|---|
| 2002 | Earth, Wind & Fire | Lifetime Achievement Award | Won |

== Grammy Awards ==
The Grammy Awards are awarded annually by the National Academy of Recording Arts and Sciences of the United States. Earth, Wind, & Fire has received 7 awards from 19 nominations. In 2016 they were the recipients of the Grammy Lifetime Achievement Award.

| Year | Nominee / work | Award | Result |
|---|---|---|---|
| 1975 | "Shining Star" | Best R&B Performance by a Duo or Group with Vocals | Won |
| 1976 | Gratitude | Best R&B Performance by a Duo or Group with Vocals | Nominated |
| 1976 | "Can't Hide Love" | Best Instrumental Arrangement Accompanying Vocalist(s | Nominated |
| 1978 | All 'N All | Best R&B Performance by a Duo or Group with Vocals | Won |
| 1978 | "Got to Get You into My Life" | Best Pop Performance by a Duo or Group with Vocals | Nominated |
| 1978 | "Runnin'" | Best R&B Instrumental Performance | Won |
| 1979 | "Boogie Wonderland" | Best Disco Recording | Nominated |
| 1979 | "Boogie Wonderland" | Best R&B Instrumental Performance | Won |
| 1979 | "After the Love Has Gone" | Best R&B Performance by a Duo or Group with Vocals | Won |
| 1979 | "After the Love Has Gone" | Record of the Year | Nominated |
| 1981 | Let's Groove" | Best R&B Performance by a Duo or Group with Vocals | Nominated |
| 1982 | "Wanna Be With You" | Best R&B Performance by a Duo or Group with Vocals | Won |
| 1983 | "Fall in Love with Me" | Best R&B Performance by a Duo or Group with Vocals | Nominated |
| 1993 | "Sunday Morning" | Best R&B Performance by a Duo or Group with Vocals | Nominated |
| 2003 | "Hold Me" | Best Traditional R&B Vocal Performance | Nominated |
| 2004 | "Show Me the Way" feat. Raphael Saadiq | Best R&B Performance by a Duo or Group with Vocals | Nominated |
| 2005 | Illumination | Best R&B Album | Nominated |
| 2016 | Earth, Wind & Fire | Grammy Lifetime Achievement Award | Won |
| 2024 | "Hollywood" (with Victoria Monét & Hazel Monét) | Best Traditional R&B Performance | Nominated |

== Hollywood Walk of Fame ==
The Hollywood Walk of Fame is a sidewalk along Hollywood Boulevard and Vine Street in Hollywood, California, with more than 2,000 five-pointed stars to honor artists for their achievement in the entertainment industry. Earth, Wind & Fire received a star on September 14, 1995. It is located at 7080 Hollywood Blvd.

| Year | Nominee / work | Award | Result |
|---|---|---|---|
| 1995 | Earth, Wind & Fire | Recipient | Won |

== NAACP Image Award ==
An NAACP Image Award is an accolade presented by the American National Association for the Advancement of Colored People to honor outstanding people of color in film, television, music, and literature. Earth, Wind & Fire has received 2 nominations. In 1994 they received the Hall of Fame Award.

| Year | Nominee / work | Award | Result |
|---|---|---|---|
| 1988 | Earth, Wind & Fire | Best Vocal Group | Nominated |
| 1994 | Earth, Wind & Fire | Hall of Fame Award | Won |
| 2006 | Earth, Wind & Fire | Outstanding Duo or Group | Nominated |

== Rock and Roll Hall of Fame ==
The Rock and Roll Hall of Fame is a museum located on the shores of Lake Erie in downtown Cleveland, Ohio, United States, dedicated to the recording history of some of the best-known and most influential artists, producers, and other people who have influenced the music industry. On March 6, 2000, Earth, Wind & Fire was inducted into the Rock and Roll Hall Of Fame.

| Year | Nominee / work | Award | Result |
|---|---|---|---|
| 2000 | Earth, Wind & Fire | Inducted | Won |

== Songwriter's Hall of Fame ==
Earth, Wind & Fire's Maurice White, Phillip Bailey, Verdine White, Al McKay and Larry Dunn were inducted on June 17, 2010.

| Year | Nominee / work | Award | Result |
|---|---|---|---|
| 2010 | Earth, Wind & Fire | Inducted | Won |

== Soul Train Music Awards ==
The Soul Train Music Awards is an annual award show which previously aired in national television syndication, and honors the best in Black music and entertainment. Earth, Wind & Fire has received a sum of 4 nominations. During 2011 they were bestowed with the Soul Train Legend Award.

| Year | Nominee / work | Award | Result |
|---|---|---|---|
| 1988 | Touch the World | Album of the Year - Group or Band | Nominated |
| 1988 | System of Survival | Best Single, Group or Band | Nominated |
| 1994 | Millennium | R&B Album of the Year, by Group, Band or Duo | Nominated |
| 2006 | Illumination | R&B Album of the Year, by Group, Band or Duo | Nominated |
| 2011 | Earth, Wind & Fire | Legend Award | Won |

== Vocal Group Hall of Fame ==
During 2003 Earth, Wind & Fire was inducted into the Vocal Group Hall of Fame.

| Year | Nominee / work | Award | Result |
|---|---|---|---|
| 2003 | Earth, Wind & Fire | Inducted | Won |

== Other awards ==
- First black performers to receive the Madison Square Garden Gold Ticket Award for selling more than 100,000 tickets.
- First black performers to receive the Columbia Records Crystal Globe Award for selling more than five million albums in foreign markets.
- On Monday, June 17, 2002, Earth Wind & Fire received the ASCAP Rhythm & Soul Heritage Award.
- Earth, Wind & Fire were inducted into Hollywood's RockWalk on Monday, July 7, 2003
- On Tuesday June 8, 2004, Earth, Wind & Fire received the National Academy of Recording Arts and Sciences Signature Governor's Award by the Los Angeles chapter of the Academy.
- During 2004 as an album "That's the Way of the World" was inducted into the Grammy Hall of Fame
- In 2007 "Shining Star" was inducted into the Grammy Hall Of Fame
- On May 10, 2008, Maurice White and Philip Bailey received honorary doctorates from the Berklee College of Music.
- On May 18, 2008, Maurice White, Ralph Johnson, Philip Bailey and Verdine White each received an honorary degree from the Arts and Media College at Columbia College Chicago during the college's 2008 commencement exercises.
- In 2009 Earth, Wind & Fire won the Entertainer Award at the 2009 TV Land Awards and the Daniel L. Stephenson Humanitarian Award for Lifetime Achievement in Music at the 15th Temecula Valley International Film Festival.
- In 2012 Earth, Wind & Fire were the recipients of the Lifetime Achievement Award at the Trumpet Awards.
- In 2012 Earth, Wind & Fire received Major League Baseball's Beacon of Change award at the Beacon Awards Banquet.
- In 2019 the single "September" was selected by the Library of Congress for preservation in the National Recording Registry for being "culturally, historically, or aesthetically significant".
- Earth, Wind & Fire were included with Sesame Street, Sally Field, Michael Tilson Thomas, and Linda Ronstadt among the 42nd Annual Kennedy Center Honors in December 2019.
