= Heritage (Earth, Wind & Fire album) =

Studio album by Earth, Wind & Fire
- Released: February 17, 1990
- Recorded: 1988–1989
- Studios: The Hit Factory (New York City, New York): Fantasy Studios (Berkeley, California); Devonshire Sound Studios (North Hollywood, California); Ocean Way Recording (Hollywood, California); Control Center Studios, Ignited Production, Lion Share Recording Studios and Record One (Los Angeles, California)
- Genres: R&B; funk; new jack swing; go-go; EDM
- Length: 51:16
- Label: Columbia
- Producers: Maurice White: Frankie Blue; Les Pierce; Robert Brookins; Ian Prince; Bill Meyers; Morris "Butch" Stewart

Earth, Wind & Fire chronology
The Best of Earth, Wind & Fire, Vol. 2 (1988)	Heritage (1990)	The Eternal Dance (1992)

Singles from Heritage
- 1. "Heritage" Released: February 1990; 2. "For the Love of You" Released: May 1990; 3. "Wanna Be The Man" Released: August 1990

Heritage is the fifteenth studio album by American band Earth, Wind & Fire, released in February 1990 on Columbia Records, and was their final release of new music for the label. The album reached No. 19 on the US Billboard Top R&B Albums chart and No.18 on the UK Blues & Soul Top British Soul Albums chart. Heritage also got to No. 31 on the Japanese Oricon Albums Chart and No. 39 on both the Finland Suomen virallinen albumilista and the German Pop Albums chart.

== Overview ==
Heritage was produced by Maurice White. White stated in an interview with the Associated Press that tributes are paid to Fats Waller and Charlie Parker on the album. He also added "The album was a germ in my mind, its very interesting watching it evolve and come to fruition. It starts as an idea, and all of a sudden its a giant thing. I was thinking, first of all of musical heritage, the things we had drawn from. And we wanted to bring to our fans attention things to appreciate, things to be drawn from." As well Heritage features guest appearances by artists such as Wanda Vaughn and Jeanette Hawes of The Emotions, Sly Stone, MC Hammer and The Boys.

== Singles ==
The title track features The Boys and reached No. 5 on the Billboard R&B Singles chart. The single, "For the Love of You" featuring MC Hammer, peaked at No. 19 on the same chart.

== Critical reception ==
Professional ratings
Review scores
Source	Rating
AllMusic	2/5 stars
Spin	(favourable)
Rolling Stone	3/5 stars
People	(favourable)
LA Weekly	(favourable)
Boston Globe	(favourable)
Chicago Tribune	3/4 stars
Baltimore Sun	(favourable)
New York Daily News	(favourable)
USA Today	(favourable)
NME	(9/10)

Lynell George of LA Weekly scribed "Heritage doesn't eschew the familiar; we get horns, harmonies and the grand-scale opulence (most notably the finale, "Welcome"). There are the hidden heirlooms as well: Sly Stone's voice unfolds out of mothballs, he's wound tight and is especially raw and cranky. The whole is randomly interspersed with brief interludes "Soweto." "Bird," "Faith" representing Africa, the jazz tradition and unwavering religious allegiance, all cornerstones of the African-American experience. A little busy, hmmm?". J.D. Considine of The Baltimore Sun declared "Earth, Wind & Fire has not only kept its sound current, but on Heritage actually seems invigorated by the process of change". John Milward of Rolling Stone called Heritage "an album that finds these soulful survivors proving that their old-fashioned strengths can still sound fresh in the most modern sense of the word". James T. Jones IV of USA Today exclaimed "The band made a comeback in '87 with Touch the World, but the new Heritage.. is better. EWF cockily flexes its muscles at musically inept teen rivals in instrumental interludes, but the first half is mainly rap-influenced..Die-hard EWF fans will prefer the second half. It showcases more of the group's characteristic vocal harmonies, horn-driven funk and thoughtful ballads."

Pablo Guzmán of the New York Daily News praised the album, saying "What Maurice White, Verdine White, Philip Bailey, Andrew Woolfolk, and Ralph Johnson set out to accomplish two years ago by re-forming the band - to be taken seriously again as purveyors of new music - they have managed successfully, as the new album, "Heritage," shows". Don Palmer of Spin noted "EWF's newest kicks with some genuine enthusiasm". Simon Witter of NME wrote "Celebrity sidetracks aside, 'Heritage' is virtually flawless". Witter summed up his review of the album by exclaiming " 'Heritage' is a stunning album, a triumph of talent and creative openness over fickle fashion and the ravages of time." Mitchell May of the Chicago Tribune, in a 3 out of 4-star review, found "For their latest album, Earth, Wind & Fire updates its sound in an attempt to win over a new audience largely unfamiliar with the hits that made the group an R&B giant in the '70s. The once mighty horn section has been reduced to a few perfunctory solos; Verdine White's thumping bass lines have been muted; and the band's two drummers have been ditched in favor of the synthesized drum-beats-from-a-can approach." Paul Robicheau of The Boston Globe also described Heritage as a "fresh and funky outing". As well Lynden Barber of The Sydney Morning Herald placed Heritage at No. 7 on his list of the top ten albums of 1990.

== Track listing ==
No.	Title	Writer(s)	Length
1.	"Interlude: Soweto"	Maurice White	0:36
2.	"Takin' Chances"	Frankie Blue, Lestley R. Pierce	3:30
3.	"Heritage (feat. The Boys)"	Frankie Blue, Lestley R. Pierce, Maurice White	4:05
4.	"Good Time (feat. Sly Stone)"	Robert Brookins, Sly Stone, Maurice White	4:05
5.	"Interlude: Body Wrap"		0:23
6.	"Anything You Want"	Ian Prince	4:46
7.	"Interlude: Bird"	Gary Bias	0:36
8.	"Wanna Be the Man (feat. MC Hammer)"	MC Hammer, Patterson, Sheldon Reynolds, Maurice White, Verdine White	4:20
9.	"Interlude: Close to Home"	Lyle Mays	1:35
10.	"Daydreamin'"	Victor Hill, Bernard Spears, Maurice White, Billy Young	4:02
11.	"King of Groove"	Morris Stewart	5:21
12.	"I'm in Love"	Victor Hill, Bernard Spears, Billy Young	4:02
13.	"For the Love of You (feat. MC Hammer)"	Robert Brookins, MC Hammer, Stephanie Mills, Maurice White	4:27
14.	"Gotta Find Out*"	Victor Hill, Bernard Spears, Billy Young	4:10
15.	"Motor"	Frankie Blue, Lestley R. Pierce, Maurice White	3:44
16.	"Interlude: Faith"	Billy Young	1:01
17.	"Welcome"	Ralph Johnson, Maurice White, Billy Young	4:03
18.	"Soweto (Reprise)"	Maurice White	0:38

== Personnel ==
Earth, Wind & Fire

- Philip Bailey – backing vocals (2–4, 8, 10–13, 17), lead vocals (12)
- Sheldon Reynolds – guitars (3, 4, 6, 8, 11, 13, 15, 17), backing vocals (3, 4, 8, 17), drum programming (8)
- Verdine White – bass (3, 8, 11)
- Sonny Emory – drums (17)
- Ralph Johnson – percussion
- Maurice White – percussion (1, 6, 8, 10, 11, 15, 17), lead vocals (2–4, 6, 8, 10, 11, 13, 15, 17), backing vocals (3, 4, 8, 10–13, 17), vocoder (15), kalimba (15)
- Andrew Woolfolk – alto saxophone (2–4, 11, 15), tenor saxophone (2–4, 6, 8, 10, 11, 15, 17)
- Gary Bias – tenor saxophone (2–4, 6, 8, 11, 15), alto saxophone (3, 4, 7, 10, 11, 15, 17)
- Reggie C. Young – trombone (2, 3, 6, 8, 10, 11, 15, 17)
- Ray Brown – trumpet (2, 4, 6, 8, 10, 11, 17)

Additional musicians

- Les Pierce – keyboards (2, 3, 15), synthesizers (2, 3, 15), drum programming (2, 3), additional keyboards (13)
- Robert Brookins – keyboards (4, 13), synthesizers (4, 13), drum programming (4, 13), synthesizer programming (13)
- Billy Savage – synthesizer programming (4)
- Ian Prince – keyboards (6), synthesizers (6), synthesizer programming (6), drum programming (6)
- Michael McKnight – synthesizer programming (6, 8, 9, 16), keyboards (8), synthesizers (8)
- Bill Meyers – keyboards (8, 10, 12), synthesizers (8–10, 12), acoustic piano (9), synthesizer programming (10)
- Billy Young – keyboards (10, 12, 16), synthesizers (10, 12, 16), synthesizer programming (10, 12), drum programming (10, 12)
- Morris "Butch" Stewart – keyboards (11), synthesizers (11), synthesizer programming (11), drum programming (11)
- Frankie Blue – guitars (2, 3, 15), percussion (15)
- Dick Smith – guitars (10, 17)
- Kuk Harrell – percussion (11)
- Michael "Patches" Stewart – trumpet (2, 8, 10, 11, 17)
- Oscar Brashear – trumpet (3, 4, 6, 15), flugelhorn (6)
- Jerry Hey – trumpet (3, 15)
- The Boys – backing vocals (3)
- Sylvester "Sly Stone" Stewart – lead vocals (4)
- Jeanette Hawes – backing vocals (6, 13, 15)
- Josie James – backing vocals (6, 15)
- Wanda Vaughn – backing vocals (6, 15)
- MC Hammer – rap (8, 13)

Music arrangements

- Les Pierce – arrangements (2, 3, 15)
- Morris "Butch" Stewart – horn arrangements (2), arrangements (11)
- Bill Meyers – horn arrangements (3, 4, 6, 10, 15), arrangements (8)
- Robert Brookins – arrangements (4, 13)
- Maurice White – horn arrangements (4), arrangements (8, 10, 12, 17)
- Ian Prince – arrangements (6)
- Billy Young – arrangements (12)

=== Production ===
- Bobby Colomby – executive producer
- Maurice White – producer
- Frankie Blue – co-producer (2, 3, 15)
- Les Pierce – co-producer (2, 3, 15)
- Robert Brookins – producer (4, 13)
- Ian Prince – co-producer (6)
- Bill Meyers – producer (9)
- Morris "Butch" Stewart – co-producer (11)
- Richard Salvato – studio coordinator
- Charles Freeman – production assistant
- Angela E. Bland – production secretary
- David Coleman – art direction
- Todd Gray – inside cover photography
- Chris Cuffaro – additional photography
- Von Thomas – additional photography
- Dennis Trantham – additional photography
- Louis Wells – wardrobe stylist
- Larry Fisher – hair stylist
- Tara Posey – make-up
- Tom Hulett – management

Technical credits

- Eddy Schreyer – mastering at Future Disc (Hollywood, California)
- Jon Gass – mixing at Elumba Recording (Los Angeles, California)
- Donnell Sullivan – mix assistant
- John Agnello – recording
- Frankie Blue – recording
- Mitch Gibson – recording
- Jesse Kanner – recording, assistant engineer
- Paul Klingberg – recording
- David Luke – recording
- Robert Macias – recording
- Les Pierce – recording
- Dave Rideau – recording
- Bryan Bunyan – assistant engineer
- Bob Loftus – assistant engineer
- Ray Pyle – assistant engineer
- Rail Rogut – assistant engineer
- Billy Savage – assistant engineer
- Jeff Welch – assistant engineer

== Charts ==
=== Weekly charts ===
Chart (1990)	Peak position
Dutch Albums (Album Top 100)	52
German Albums (Offizielle Top 100)	39
Finland Suomen virallinen albumilista	39
Japanese Albums (Oricon)	31
UK Blues & Soul Top British Soul Albums	18
US Billboard 200	70
US Top R&B/Hip-Hop Albums (Billboard)	19

=== Year-end charts ===
Chart (1990)	Position
US Top R&B/Hip-Hop Albums (Billboard)	100

Singles
Year	Single	Chart	Position
1990	"For the Love of You"	Billboard Hot R&B Singles	19
1990	"Heritage"	Billboard Hot R&B Singles	5
1990	"Heritage"	Japanese Pop Singles (Oricon)	4
1990	"Wanna Be the Man"	Billboard Hot R&B Singles	46
1990	"Wanna Be the Man"	Japanese Pop Singles (Oricon)	65

== Accolades ==
Author	Publication	Country	Accolade	Year	Rank
Lynden Barber	Sydney Morning Herald	Australia	Blue Hot Numbers	1990	7
