= Reverence (Nathan East album) =

Studio album by Nathan East
- Released: January 20, 2017
- Studios: CA Fisher Lane Farm Studios, UK; Castle Oaks Studio, Calabasas, California; Move Studio, Woodland Hills, California; NRG Studios, North Hollywood, California; Ocean Way Studios, Nashville, Tennessee; The Tracking Room, Nashville, Tennessee; United Recording Studios, Hollywood, California; Yahama Entertainment Group Studios, Franklin, Tennessee
- Genre: Jazz
- Length: 57:53
- Label: Yamaha Entertainment Group
- Producers: Nathan East, Chris Gero, Marcel East

Nathan East chronology
The New Cool (2015)	Reverence (2017)

Reverence is an album by American bass player Nathan East, released in 2017 on Yamaha Entertainment Group.

The album peaked at No. 1 on both the Billboard Top Jazz Albums and Top Contemporary Jazz Album charts and No. 23 on the Billboard Independent Albums chart.

== Critical reception ==
Professional ratings
Review scores
Source	Rating
AllMusic	4/5 stars

Andy Kellman of AllMusic noted "One inspiration for the title of bassist Nathan East's second album for Yamaha -- third if the Grammy-nominated Bob James collaboration The New Cool is counted -- was the passing of Maurice White. The Earth, Wind & Fire leader is twice paid explicit tribute on Reverence ... Given East's continued predilection for uplifting wordless melodies, and the frequent use of bright horns, the uplifting spirit of EW&F flows through much of the album."

== Singles ==
A cover of "Serpentine Fire" featuring EWF's Philip Bailey, Verdine White and Ralph Johnson reached No. 17 on the Billboard Smooth Jazz Songs chart.

== Track listing ==
No.	Title	Writer(s)	Length
1.	"Love's Holiday"	Maurice White, Skip Scarborough	06:01
2.	"Lifecyle"	Nathan East, Tom Keane	05:55
3.	"Elevanate"	Chuck Loeb	05:24
4.	"Serpentine Fire"	Reginald Burke, Maurice White, Verdine White	05:13
5.	"Feels Like Home"	Randall Stuart Newman	06:14
6.	"Higher Ground"	Stevie Wonder	05:06
7.	"The Mood I'm In"	Nathan East, Tom Keane	04:21
8.	"Over the Rainbow"	Harold Arlen, E.Y. "Yip" Harburg	03:11
9.	"Shadow"	Lendell Black, Nathan East, Chris Gero	05:44
10.	"Pasan"	Andrés Beeuwsaert	03:34
11.	"Why Not This Sunday"	Howard McCrary
12.	"Until We Meet Again"	Nathan East	01:25

== Charts ==
Chart (2017)	Peak position
US Billboard Top Jazz Albums	1
US Billboard Top Contemporary Jazz Albums	1
US Billboard Top Independent Albums	23
