= Nathan East (album) =

Studio album by Nathan East
- Released: March 25, 2014
- Studio: Yamaha Entertainment Group Studios (Franklin, Tennessee); Ocean Way Nashville (Nashville, Tennessee); Ocean Way Recording (Hollywood, California); House of Blues (Encino, California); Pyramid Studios (Studio City, California); Studio 101 (Tarzana, California); British Grove Studios (London, UK).
- Genre: Jazz, funk, instrumental, vocal
- Length: 1:05:35
- Label: Yamaha Entertainment Group
- Producer: Chris Gero, Marcel East, Nathan East

Nathan East chronology
Nathan East (2014)	The New Cool (2015)

Nathan East is the debut album by American bass guitarist Nathan East, released in March 2014 by the Yamaha Entertainment Group. The album reached No. 1 on the Billboard Contemporary Jazz Albums chart and No. 2 on the Billboard Jazz Albums chart.

== Overview ==
This album features vocal performances by Eric Clapton, Sara Bareilles and Michael McDonald. Stevie Wonder also plays the harmonica on an instrumental cover of his hit single "Overjoyed". Another cover on the album was an instrumental reimagining of Wonder's "Sir Duke".

As East is best known for his bass guitar skills, the album contains many bass guitar led melodies. The cover of the 1965 Beatles song "Yesterday" features East's son Noah East on piano. While largely an album of covers, including those of East's band Fourplay and Steve Winwood's "Can't Find My Way Home", which East had previous played on tours with Clapton, there are also original works, such as "Daft Funk", a play on words on East's work with French group Daft Punk, and "Madiba", a tribute to former South African president Nelson Mandela.

== Critical reception ==
As an album Nathan East was Grammy nominated in the category of Best Contemporary Instrumental Album.

== Track listing ==
No.	Title	Writer(s)	Length
1.	"101 Eastbound"	Marcel East, Nathan East	5:24
2.	"Sir Duke"	Stevie Wonder	4:05
3.	"Letter From Home"	Pat Metheny	4:02
4.	"Moondance" (Featuring Michael McDonald)	Van Morrison	4:20
5.	"I Can Let Go Now" (Featuring Sara Bareilles)	Michael McDonald	2:47
6.	"Daft Funk" (Featuring Mr. TalkBox)	N. East, Michael Thompson	4:47
7.	"SeveNate"	Chuck Loeb	3:39
8.	"Can't Find My Way Home" (Featuring Eric Clapton)	Steve Winwood	5:32
9.	"Moodswing"	Bob James	5:08
10.	"Overjoyed" (Featuring Stevie Wonder)	Stevie Wonder	4:26
11.	"Yesterday"	John Lennon, Paul McCartney	3:14
12.	"Madiba"	N. East, Chris Gero	8:22
13.	"America the Beautiful"	Katharine Lee Bates, Samuel A. Ward	4:34
14.	"Finally Home"	Chris Gero, Oda Kazumasa, N. East	5:15
Total length:			1:05:35

== Personnel ==
- Nathan East – bass (1–8, 10, 12–14), vocals (1–3, 7, 8, 11, 12, 14), arrangements (1–3, 6, 8, 10, 12, 13), upright bass (9, 11)
- Jeff Babko – acoustic piano (1, 3, 5–8), keyboards (1, 2, 6, 10, 14), Hammond B3 organ (2), arrangements (2, 8), acoustic piano solo (12), Moog synthesizer (12, 14)
- Chris Gero – additional keyboards, additional programming, arrangements (2, 3, 6, 8, 12, 13), guitars (12)
- Greg Phillinganes – keyboards (4, 10)
- Tim Carmon – Hammond B3 organ (6, 8, 10, 12), Rhodes piano (12)
- David Paich – keyboards (8), Wurlitzer electric piano (8, 12), Hammond B3 organ (12)
- Bob James – acoustic piano (9), arrangements (9)
- Noah East – acoustic piano (11)
- Billy Childs – acoustic piano (14)
- Ray Parker Jr. – guitars (1, 2, 6)
- Michael Thompson – guitars (1–3, 6, 8, 10, 12), arrangements (1, 6), electric guitar (7)
- Andrew Synoweic – guitars (4)
- Chuck Loeb – acoustic guitar (7), electric guitar (7), guitar solo (7), arrangements (7), acoustic bass (14)
- Eric Clapton – guitars (8)
- Ricky Lawson – drums (1–3, 6–8, 10, 12, 14)
- Vinnie Colaiuta – drums (4)
- Rafael Padilla – percussion (1, 2, 6–8, 10, 12, 14)
- Paulinho da Costa – percussion (10)
- Tom Scott – saxophone (1, 2, 4, 6), horn arrangements (1, 2, 4), arrangements (4)
- Joel Peskin – baritone saxophone (1, 2, 4), tenor saxophone (1, 2, 4)
- Andy Martin – trombone (1, 2, 4)
- Chuck Findley – trumpet (1, 2, 4)
- Sara Sant'Ambrosio – cello (9)
- Kristin Wilkinson – viola (9)
- David Angell – violin (9)
- David Davidson – violin (9)
- Stevie Wonder – harmonica (10)
- Steve Hill – arrangements (11)
- Lendell Black – arrangements (3, 5, 13)
- Michael McDonald – vocals (4)
- Sara Bareilles – vocals (5)
- Mr. TalkBox – talkbox vocals (6)
- Carmen Cuesta – vocals (7)
- Janice Gaines – backing vocals (8)
- Gale Mayes – backing vocals (8)
- Debi Selby – backing vocals (8, 12)
- Ricky Braddy – backing vocals (12)
- Ashley Guilbert – backing vocals (12)
- Jenn Helvering – backing vocals (12)
- Jacob Hubbard – backing vocals (12)
- Shelly Justice – backing vocals (12)
- Cersle Keenan – backing vocals (12)
- Melodie Kirkpatrick – backing vocals (12)
- Maureen Murphy – backing vocals (12)
- Andrew Thompson – backing vocals (12)
- Ricky Braddy, Janice Gaines, Gale Mayes, Kim Mont, Jon Reddick and Debi Selby – America choir (13)

The Nashville Recording Orchestra (Tracks 3, 5, 12 & 13)

- Nathan East – arrangements
- Lendell Black – arrangements, conductor, orchestrations (12, 13)
- Chris Gero – arrangements, orchestrations (12)
- David Davidson – concertmaster
- David Angell – contractor
- Barry Green and Prentiss Hobbs – trombone
- Jennifer Kummar and Patrick Walle – French horn
- Sam Bacco – percussion
- John Catchings, Anthony LaMarchina, Carole Rabinowitz and Julie Tanner – cello
- Craig Nelson – string bass
- Monisa Angell, Seanad Chang, Jim Grosjean and Kristin Wilkinson – viola
- David Angell, Carolyn Bailey, Zeneba Bowers, Weitsun Chang, Janet Darnall, David Davidson, Alison Gooding, Erin Hall, Elizabeth Lamb, Bruce Wethey and Karen Winklemann – violin

== Production ==
- Nathan East – producer
- Chris Gero – producer
- Marcel East – producer (10), additional engineer
- Bryan Lenox – engineer, mixing
- Moogie Canazio – additional engineer
- Alan Douglas – additional engineer
- Elliott Eicheldinger – additional engineer
- Ken Freeman – additional engineer
- Tom Keane – additional engineer
- Rouble Kapoor – assistant engineer
- Tanner Lenox – assistant engineer
- Max Moon – assistant engineer
- Wesley Seidman – assistant engineer
- Nick Spezia – assistant engineer
- Dave Kutch – mastering at The Mastering Palace (New York City, New York)
- JoAnn Tominaga – production coordinator
- Anderson Design Group – design, layout
- Kharen Hill – photography
