= The Best of Earth, Wind & Fire, Vol. 2 =

Greatest hits album by Earth, Wind & Fire
- Released: November 1988
- Genre: R&B
- Length: 54:33
- Label: Columbia/Legacy
- Producers: Maurice White; Rhett Lawrence; Joseph Wissert; Charles Stepney; Leo Sacks; Al McKay

Earth, Wind & Fire chronology
Touch the World (1987)	The Best of Earth, Wind & Fire, Vol. 2 (1988)	Heritage (1990)

Singles from The Best of Earth, Wind & Fire, Vol. 2
- 1. "Turn on (The Beat Box)" Released: November 14, 1988

The Best of Earth, Wind & Fire, Vol. 2 is the second greatest hits album by American band Earth, Wind & Fire, released in November 1988 on Columbia Records. This album has been certified Gold in the US by the RIAA.

== Overview ==
The album is the follow-up to the Quintuple Platinum album The Best of Earth, Wind & Fire, Vol. 1, containing singles from the band's later career throughout the late 1970s and the 1980s. It also features the song "Serpentine Fire", which was not included on Vol 1., as well as the album version of "Fantasy".

Alongside the singles, the album contained a previously unreleased song entitled "Turn on (The Beat Box)", which was released as a single and reached number 26 on the Billboard Hot R&B Singles chart.

== Critical reception ==
Professional ratings
Review scores
Source	Rating
AllMusic	4.5/5 stars
PopMatters	(favorable)
Village Voice	(A−)
Billboard	(favorable)
New York Daily News	(favorable)
Cincinnati Post	4/5 stars
Tom Hull – on the Web	(A−)

Ron Wynn of AllMusic in a 4.5 out of five stars review wrote, "If you enjoyed their disco and late '70s cuts more than the early tracks, this anthology is worth getting". Ben Varkentine of Popmatters noted "Earth, Wind & Fire Vol. II can't be reviewed so much as announced. If you want this CD, you know what at least some of it sounds like, if not, you don't." David Browne of the New York Daily News exclaimed, "Not as solid as Vol. I, but separates the wheat from the chaff of their later albums. 'After the Love Is Gone' and 'Boogie Wonderland' are here, but last year's comeback, 'System of Survival', isn't. With a 4 out of 5 star review Larry Nager of the Cincinnati Post claimed "Like most second-volume best-ofs the set is second best but with the sweet vocals of Philip Bailey the uncompromising groove of Maurice White and the EWF horns..second best is more than good enough." With an A− grade, Robert Christgau of the Village Voice described the album as "some slick, soulful fun".

== Track listing ==
No.	Title	Writer(s)	Length
1.	"Turn on (The Beat Box)" (Previously unreleased)	Rhett Lawrence, Martin Page, Maurice White	4:39
2.	"Let's Groove" (From Raise!, 1981)	Wayne Vaughn, Maurice White	5:34
3.	"After the Love Has Gone" (From I Am, 1979)	Bill Champlin, David Foster, Jay Graydon	4:24
4.	"Fantasy" (From All 'n All, 1977)	Eduardo del Barrio, Maurice White, Verdine White	4:36
5.	"Devotion" (From Open Our Eyes, 1974)	Philip Bailey, Maurice White	4:48
6.	"Serpentine Fire" (From All 'n All, 1977)	Sonny Burke, Maurice White, Verdine White	3:49
7.	"Love's Holiday" (From All 'n All, 1977)	Skip Scarborough, Maurice White	4:21
8.	"Boogie Wonderland" (From I Am, 1979)	Jon Lind, Allee Willis	4:47
9.	"Saturday Nite" (From Spirit, 1976)	Philip Bailey, Al McKay, Maurice White	3:59
10.	"Mighty Mighty" (From Open Our Eyes, 1974)	Maurice White, Verdine White	3:01

Bonus Tracks
No.	Title	Writer(s)	Length
11.	"Keep Your Head to the Sky" (From Head to the Sky, 1973)	Maurice White	5:10
12.	"I'll Write a Song for You" (From Spirit, 1976)	Philip Bailey, Steve Beckmeier, Al McKay	5:23

== Charts ==
=== Albums ===
Year	Chart	Peak position
1988	US Billboard 200	190
1988	US Billboard Top R&B Albums	74

=== Singles ===
Singles
Year	Title	Chart	Position
1988	Turn on (The Beat Box)	US Billboard Hot R&B Singles	26
1988	Turn on (The Beat Box)	N.L. Dutch Singles (Dutch Single Top 100)	30

== Certifications ==
Region	Certification	Certified units/sales
United States (RIAA)	Gold	500,000^{^}
^{^} Shipments figures based on certification alone.
