= Heritage (song) =

Single by Earth, Wind & Fire featuring The Boys

from the album Heritage
- B-side: "Gotta Find Out"
- Released: February 1990
- Genre: R&B; new jack swing; funk
- Length: 4:05
- Label: Columbia
- Songwriters: Maurice White; Lestley Pierce; Frankie Blue
- Producer: Maurice White

Earth, Wind & Fire singles chronology
| "Turn on (The Beat Box)" (1988) | "Heritage" (1990) | "For the Love of You" (1990) |

The Boys singles chronology
| "Lucky Charms" (1989) | "Heritage" (1990) | "Crazy" (1990) |

Music video
- "Heritage" on YouTube

"Heritage" is a song by American band Earth, Wind & Fire featuring Suns of Light (as the Boys), released in February 1990 by Columbia Records as the first single from their fifteenth studio album. The single reached No. 5 on the US Billboard Hot R&B Singles chart, No. 5 on the Cash Box Top R&B Singles chart, No. 4 on the Japanese Pop Singles (Oricon) chart and No. 23 on the Finland Suomen virallinen singlelista.

== Overview ==
"Heritage" was produced by Maurice White and written by White, Lestley Pierce and Frankie Blue. With a duration of four minutes and five seconds the song has a prestissimo tempo of 207 beats per minute.

The single's B-side was a song called "Gotta Find Out". Both "Heritage" and "Gotta Find Out" came upon EWF's 1990 studio album Heritage.

A music video was also issued in 1990 to accompany the single.

== Critical reception ==
May Mitchell of The Chicago Tribune proclaimed that "guest appearances are made by the Boys who lend a nice choral touch to the funky title track". Billboard called "Heritage" "a solid funky jam strong on complex harmonies and prideful lyrics" with "youthful zest". Peter Kinghorn of the Newcastle Chronicle found a "Throbbing dance beat with the Boys helping out on harmonies." John Milward of Rolling Stone declared that the "prideful title tune even throws in the kind of admonition — “This is a party, y’all,” courtesy of the Boys — favored by Earth, Wind and Fire's more radical old rivals in Parliament-Funkadelic". Pablo Guzman of the New York Daily News also exclaimed that EWF "jumps into radioactive with Takin' Chances and Heritage, the latter featuring the Boys. The union is a kicking one". James T. Jones IV of USA Today found that "EWF smartly gets help from..The Boys on the muscular title track, a song of racial pride."

== Credits ==
- Producer: Frankie Blue, Lestley R. Pierce & Maurice White
- Composer: Maurice White, Lestley R. Pierce & Frankie Blue
- Arranger: Lestley R. Pierce
- Horn Arranger: Bill Meyers
- Synthesizer: Lestley R. Pierce
- Saxophone: Gary Bias & Andrew Woolfolk
- Trombone: Reggie Young
- Trumpet: Jerry Hey & Oscar Brashear
- Drum Programming: Lestley R. Pierce
- Synthesizer Programming: Lestley R. Pierce
- Keyboards: Lestley R. Pierce
- Guitar: Frankie Blue & Sheldon Reynolds
- Bass: Verdine White
- Background Vocals: The Boys, Sheldon Reynolds, Philip Bailey & Maurice White
- Lead Vocals Maurice White

== Charts ==
| Chart (1990) | Peak position |
|---|---|
| Japanese Pop Singles (Oricon) | 4 |
| Finland (Suomen virallinen singlelista) | 23 |
| US Hot R&B Singles (Billboard) | 5 |
| US Top R&B Singles (Cash Box) | 5 |
