= For the Love of You (Earth, Wind & Fire song) =

Single by Earth, Wind & Fire featuring MC Hammer

from the album Heritage
- B-side: "Motor"
- Released: May 1990
- Genre: R&B
- Length: 4:27
- Label: Columbia
- Songwriters: Maurice White; Robert Brookins; Stephanie Mills; MC Hammer
- Producers: Maurice White, Robert Brookins

Earth, Wind & Fire singles chronology
"Heritage" (1990)	"For the Love of You" (1990)	"Wanna Be the Man" (1990)

MC Hammer singles chronology
"Have You Seen Her" (1990)	"For the Love of You" (1990)	"Pray" (1990)

"For the Love of You" is a song recorded by the American band Earth, Wind & Fire (EWF) featuring MC Hammer for EWF's 1990 studio album Heritage. It was released as a single in May 1990 by Columbia Records, peaking at No. 19 on the Billboard Hot R&B Singles chart and No. 12 on the Cashbox Top R&B Singles chart.

== Overview ==
"For the Love of You" was produced by Earth, Wind & Fire leader Maurice White and Robert Brookins, and written by White, Brookins, Stephanie Mills and MC Hammer. With a duration of four minutes and twenty seven seconds, the song has a tempo of 106 bpm.

== Critical reception ==
John Milward of Rolling Stone said For the Love of You is "spun on a skeletal rhythm suggestive of Cameo". Andy Gill of The Independent said "Fortunately, the sinuous funk workouts like 'For the Love of You', 'King of Groove' and 'Gotta Find Out' are as good as ever." Mitchell May of the Chicago Tribune wrote "Hammer`s clipped delivery meshes so well with EWF's leaner sound that they might want to consider hiring him full-time". James T. Jones IV of USA Today found "EWF smartly gets help from MC Hammer on the hard edged.. (For) The Love of You."

== Credits ==
- Featuring: MC Hammer
- Producer: Robert Brookins & Maurice White
- Composer: Maurice White, Stephanie Mills, MC Hammer & Robert Brookins
- Additional keyboards: Lestley R. Pierce
- Drum programming: Robert Brookins
- Synthesizer programming: Robert Brookins
- Synthesizers: Robert Brookins
- Keyboards: Robert Brookins
- Guitar: Sheldon Reynolds
- Background vocals: Robert Brookins, Jeanette Hawes, Philip Bailey & Maurice White
- Lead vocals: Maurice White
- Arranger: Robert Brookins

== Charts ==
Chart (1990)	Peak position
U.S. Billboard Hot R&B Singles	19
U.S. Cashbox Top R&B Singles	12
