= Spend the Night =

Spend the Night may refer to:

- Spend the Night (The Donnas album), 2002
- Spend the Night (Isley Brothers album), 1989
- "Spend the Night" (Danny J Lewis song), 1998
- "Spend the Night" (Earth, Wind & Fire song), 1993
- "Spend the Night in Love", a song by the Four Seasons, 1980
- "Spend the Night", a song by the Cool Notes, 1985
- "Spend the Night", a song by E-40 from the album Revenue Retrievin': Night Shift, 2010
- "Spend the Night", a song by Plies from the album Da REAList, 2008

== See also ==
- "Beetain Na Beetain Raina" (lit. 'Will the night be spent'), a song by Bhupen Hazarika and Asha Bhosle from the 1993 Indian film Rudaali
