= Sunday Morning (Earth, Wind & Fire song) =

Single by Earth, Wind & Fire

from the album Millennium
- B-side: "The L Word"
- Released: August 1993
- Genre: R&B; new jack swing
- Length: 4:10
- Label: Reprise Records
- Songwriters: Sheldon Reynolds; Maurice White; Allee Willis
- Producer: Maurice White

Earth, Wind & Fire singles chronology
"Wanna Be the Man" (1990)	"Sunday Morning" (1993)	"Spend the Night" (1993)

Music video
- "Sunday Morning" on YouTube

"Sunday Morning" is a song recorded by American band Earth, Wind & Fire, released in August 1993 by Reprise Records as the second single from their sixteenth album, Millennium (1993). The song reached No. 10 on the US Billboard Adult R&B Songs chart, No. 20 on the Billboard Hot R&B Singles chart and No. 35 on the Billboard Adult Contemporary Songs chart. "Sunday Morning" also reached No. 26 on the Dutch Pop Singles chart and No. 33 on the Canadian RPM Top Singles chart. The song was Grammy nominated in the category of Best R&B Vocal Performance by a Duo or Group.

== Overview ==
"Sunday Morning" was produced by Maurice White and arranged by Tom Tom 84. The song was composed by White, Sheldon Reynolds and Allee Willis. The b-side of the single was a track called "The L Word". Both "Sunday Morning" and "The L Word" also came off EWF's 1993 studio album Millennium.

With a duration of four minutes and eleven seconds the song has a vivace tempo of 159 bpm. A music video for the song was also released by Warner Bros. in September 1993.

== Critical reception ==
Larry Flick from Billboard magazine described "Sunday Morning" as a "midtempo jewel from (EWF's) new Millennium opus", "an excellent way to close the summer season" and a "delicious" tune. Andy Gill of The Independent proclaimed EWF "open in high gear with 'Even If You Wonder' and 'Sunday Morning'" on Millennium. The Buffalo News said in acclaim "Tracks like 'Sunday Morning' and 'Blood Brothers' bring back the EW&F spirit without dragging up carbon copies of past hits".

== Charts ==
Chart (1993)	Peak position
Canada Top Singles (RPM)	33
Europe (European Hit Radio)	21
Netherlands (Dutch Top 40)	25
Netherlands (Single Top 100)	26
UK Airplay (ERA)	72
US Billboard Hot 100	53
US Adult Contemporary (Billboard)	35
US Adult R&B Airplay (Billboard)	10
US Hot R&B Singles (Billboard)	20
US Mainstream R&B/Hip-Hop (Billboard)	17
US Rhythmic Top 40 (Billboard)	31
US Top 40 Mainstream (Billboard)	34
US Cash Box Top 100	40
