= Turn on (The Beat Box) =

Single by Earth, Wind & Fire

from the album The Best of Earth, Wind & Fire, Vol. 2
- B-side: "Turn On (The Beat Box)" (Instrumental)
- Released: 1988
- Genre: Pop, funk
- Length: 4:15 (single version) 4:39 (album version)
- Label: Columbia
- Songwriters: Maurice White; Rhett Lawrence; Martin Page
- Producers: Maurice White, Rhett Lawrence

Earth, Wind & Fire singles chronology
"Evil Roy" (1988)	"Turn on (The Beat Box)" (1988)	"Heritage" (1990)

"Turn On (The Beat Box)" is a song by American band Earth, Wind & Fire, released in 1988 by Columbia Records as a single from their second greatest hits compilation, The Best of Earth, Wind & Fire, Vol. 2 (1988). The song reached No. 26 on the US Billboard Hot Black Singles chart, No. 12 on the Dutch Top 40 chart, and No. 30 on the Dutch Single Top 100 chart.

== Overview ==
"Turn On (The Beat Box)" was produced by Maurice White and Rhett Lawrence, who both wrote the song with Martin Page. The song was featured on the soundtrack to the 1988 film Caddyshack II.

== Critical reception ==
Billboard called the song "a light, pop inflected chugger".

== Charts ==
Chart (1988–1989)	Peak position
Finland (Suomen virallinen singlelista)	30
Netherlands (Dutch Top 40 Tipparade)	12
Netherlands (Dutch Single Top 100)	30
Japanese (Oricon Singles Chart)	43
US Hot Black Singles (Billboard)	26
