= To You (Earth, Wind & Fire song) =

Single by Earth, Wind & Fire featuring Brian McKnight

from the album Illumination
- Released: 2005
- Genre: R&B
- Label: Sanctuary
- Songwriter(s): Brian McKnight
- Producer(s): Brian McKnight

Earth, Wind & Fire singles chronology
"Pure Gold" (2005)	"To You" (2005)	"Change Your Mind" (2006)

"To You" is a song by the band Earth, Wind & Fire featuring Brian McKnight, released as a single in 2005 on Sanctuary Records. The song was written by McKnight for the band's 2005 album Illumination.

== Chart performance ==
The song reached No. 16 on the Billboard Adult R&B Songs chart and No. 29 on the Billboard Smooth Jazz Songs chart.

== Critical reception ==
Rob Theakston of AllMusic stated that McKnight makes an "eloquent appearance" on the song.
