= Chris Gero =

American music executive

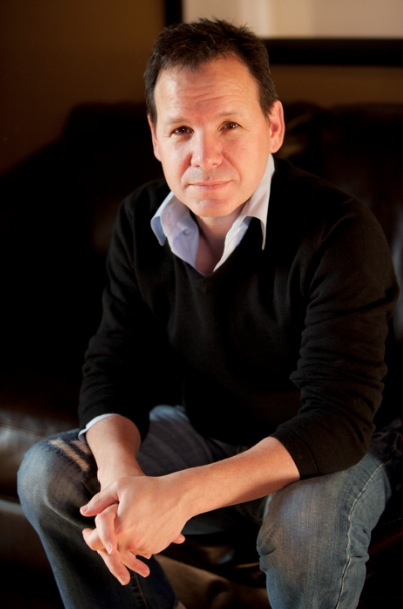
- Chris Gero - Founder of Yamaha Entertainment Group of America
- Occupations: Chief Artist Relations Executive of Yamaha Artist Relations Group, Founder of Yamaha Entertainment Group, Songwriter, Record Label Executive, Concert Producer, Film Director and Record Producer

Chris Gero is a Grammy nominated American music industry executive, concert producer, record producer, songwriter, film director and composer, founder of the Yamaha Entertainment Group of America, and Chief Artist Relations Executive for Yamaha Artist Relations Group. He is responsible for the management and branding of Yamaha's global roster, having signed more than 3,600 artists to contract to date. Gero oversees Yamaha's artist collaborations, including Elton John, Alicia Keys, Paul McCartney, Norah Jones, Josh Groban, Sarah McLachlan, Sheryl Crow, John Legend, and Ben Folds.

Upon its founding by Gero in 2012, Yamaha Entertainment Group is the succession of Yamaha Corporate Artist Affairs, which Gero also founded in 2001.

== History ==
Chris Gero's career at Yamaha began in the early 1990s as a sponsored artist. When that agreement ended, he began working with them in a consulting role which led to a permanent position, focused on artist services. Gero then developed a revived artist services platform that found ways to support artists through materials and services, e.g., equipment and marketing, and to strengthen Yamaha's brand in the world of music. This direction ultimately led to the production of films, records, promo videos and large format concerts.

A 25-year veteran of the business, Gero is based in Franklin, Tennessee but oversees additional offices in New York, Indianapolis and Los Angeles. As Chief Artist Relations Executive of Yamaha, he oversees branding and marketing partnerships with over 3,600 North American acts including those mentioned above, as well as Robin Thicke, Sara Bareilles, John Legend, Luke Bryan, Brad Paisley, Lady Antebellum's Dave Haywood, Michael W. Smith and Michael McDonald, Colbie Caillat, Zac Brown, Graham Nash, Dave Koz, Rodrigo Y Gabriela, David Foster, Jason Mraz, Richard Marx, Mindi Abair, Jon McLaughlin and Ingrid Michaelson, among others.

In 2000, Gero launched Yamaha's "All Access" Magazine, publishing its premiere issue in the summer of that year. In January 2009, the magazine expanded to include online behind-the-scenes content. Gero's efforts have facilitated the use of Yamaha pianos at several NFL Super Bowl performances - Paul McCartney in 2005, Alicia Keys in 2013 and John Legend in 2015.

In September 2012, Yamaha created a new division, Yamaha Entertainment Group of America, under Gero's direction. With the establishment of Yamaha Entertainment Group, the company now offers recording and video production studios to help artists record, produce, and market their original content, as a means to expand the collaboration efforts and enhance the global brand messaging. Gero states that the Yamaha Entertainment Group is a unique entity within Yamaha, not just because of its focus, but because of its small size and personal nature. Being able to maintain such a working environment in a conservative corporation resulted from years of successful results from Gero's (and his staff's) artist and industry relationships. Yamaha Entertainment Group of America has partnered with ADA (Alternative Distribution Alliance) for the marketing, promotion and distribution of the label's releases. The record label's artist roster includes Nathan East, Bob James, Jason Webb, Frederic Chiu, LEOGUN and Pull Start Rockets. Yamaha Entertainment Group has also produced and directed several film projects, including Elton John's The Million Dollar Piano and "The Making of Elton John's The Million Dollar Piano," "Nathan East: For The Record," "The Making of Leogun By The Reins," the Emmy Award-winning short film "The Gift", and behind-the-scenes exclusives for Yamaha's All Access magazine.

== Concert Production ==
Gero is known for his large scale productions, which typically feature lavish elements such as a house band, full orchestral accompaniments, 100-piece gospel choirs, and elaborate set and lighting designs. Gero has produced shows and events for artists including Ray Charles, Stevie Wonder, Elton John, Tony Bennett, Michael McDonald, Norah Jones, Brad Paisley, Natalie Cole and John Legend.

In 2000, Gero produced "Michael McDonald: A Gathering of Friends." The concert was hosted by Jeff Bridges, with McDonald performing duets with Patti LaBelle, Christopher Cross, James Ingram, Kenny Loggins, The Doobie Brothers and Jeff Bridges himself. The accompanying DVD was released on Image Entertainment in 2001, and the concert became a PBS Special.

In 2003, Gero produced the NAMM Foundation Concert Honoring Sir Elton John, presented by Yamaha, which raised $330,000 to benefit music education and research. Beneficiaries of the funds raised by the event include The American Music Conference (AMC), The International Foundation for Music Research (IFMR) and The Museum of Making Music. The star-studded benefit was held January 17, 2003 at the Arrowhead Pond in Anaheim. Hosted by Emmy Award winning actor Eric McCormack, some of the world's most popular artists participated in the concert, each performing an Elton John classic. The concert rundown featured Nikka Costa ("Levon"), Rufus Wainwright ("Goodbye Yellow Brick Road"), Eric McCormack ("Captain Fantastic"), Bruce Hornsby ("Burn Down The Mission"), Jewel ("Your Song"), Brian McKnight ("Rocket Man"), Norah Jones ("Tiny Dancer"), Brian Wilson ("Someone Saved My Life Tonight"), Randy Newman ("Benny And The Jets"), Diana Krall ("Border Song"), Take 6 ("Philadelphia Freedom"), Vanessa Carlton ("Don't Let the Sun Go Down on Me"), Ray Charles ("Sorry Seems To Be The Hardest Word"), Michael McDonald ("Take Me To the Pilot"), Carmen Twillie and the Circle of Life Choir (tribute to "The Lion King") and John Mayer (a duet with Elton John on "Sacrifice"). Elton John then hit the stage, entertaining the audience for more than an hour with a selection of songs, after which all the performers returned to the stage for the grand finale, "Crocodile Rock."

On January 14, 2010, Gero produced Yamaha's 50th Anniversary Dealer Concert - held in conjunction with the Winter NAMM event - at Disney California Adventure Park's Hyperion Theater. The show's lineup of performers included Natalie Cole, Jason Mraz, Michael McDonald, Vince Gill, John Ondrasik of Five for Fighting, Jon McLaughlin and the band Pull Start Rockets, including a special surprise appearance by comedian Damon Wayans.

In 2013, Gero produced a concert for Yamaha's 125th anniversary featuring Elton John, which earned the reputation as the "concert heard around the world". Using Yamaha's patented Disklavier technology, which allows live performances to be measured by a computer and instantly reproduced on remote acoustic pianos in participating cities, audiences from around the world (including Moscow, Vancouver, Seoul and 56 other cities throughout the globe) were able to see, hear, and be a part of this live interactive and fully immersive concert experience. This was the first instance where Disklaviers were used to play live performances, not recorded ones. Gero has stated, "the hope is that live communication between instruments will go beyond spectacles like this concert, and that, for instance, a master class can be taught in Tokyo, taught to 500 kids around the world, and it be completely tactile. This technology is changing the way music is made and performed." Other artists who performed that night include Amy Grant, Chaka Khan, Dave Grusin, David Foster, Earth, Wind & Fire, Jackson Browne, James Newton Howard, LEOGUN, Lucy Schwartz, Michael McDonald, Sarah McLachlan, Sinbad and Toto. Elton John was accompanied by with a 60-piece orchestra, under the musical direction of Yamaha artist and award-winning bassist Nathan East.

To date, Gero has produced shows featuring Steven Tyler with his Nashville-based band Loving Mary, Joe Walsh, The Fray, John Rezenik of the Goo Goo Dolls, Jason Isbell, Alex Newell, Colbie Caillat, James Blunt, Jamie Cullum, Bob James, Jonathan Butler, Nathan East, The Piano Guys, David Paich, Steve Porcaro, Sinbad, Patti Austin, Ben Folds, Josh Groban, Summer Horns, Michael McDonald, Wynonna Judd, Elton John, Sarah McLachlan, Lucy Schwartz, Landon Pigg, LEOGUN, Chaka Khan, Earth, Wind & Fire, Amy Grant, Dave Grusin, Lee Ritenour, Toto, David Foster, James Ingram, Todd Alsup, Vanessa Carlton, Jon McLaughin, Greg Sczebel, Michael Bolton, Sheryl Crow, Sara Bareilles, Ingrid Michaelson, Natalie Cole, Vince Gill, Jason Mraz, John Ondrasik of Five for Fighting, Pull Star Rockets, Damon Wayans, Mickey Mouse, The Manhattan Transfer, Gordon Goodwin's Big Phat Band, John Legend, Jon Anderson, Craig Ferguson, Gabe Dixon, Chantal Kreviazuk, Ben Kweller, Kenny Loggins, Travis Tritt, Heather Bradley, Richard Marx, Dr. John, Dennis DeYoung, Tommy Sims, Teddy Geiger, Wayne Brady, Judith Owen, Brad Paisley, Gavin DeGraw, Brian Wilson, K.D. Lang, Randy Jackson, Beth Hart, Phil Vassar, Al Green, Robert Randolph, the USC Trojan Marching Band, Ray Charles, Nikka Costa, Bruce Hornsby, Jewel, Norah Jones, Diana Krall, John Mayer, Brian McKnight, Randy Newman, Take 6, Rufus Wainwright, Carmen Twillie, Eric McCormack, Tony Bennett, David Benoit, Al Jarreau, Rick Braun, Dave Koz, Brenda Russell, Tower of Power, Carlos D'L Puerto, Patti LeBelle, Christopher Cross, The Doobie Brothers, Billy Dean, James Newton Howard, Edwin McCain, David Pack, Alan Parsons, Boz Scaggs, SHeDaisy, The Wilkinsons, Steve Winwood, Jeff Bridges, the Yellowjackets, Martin Taylor, Bela Fleck & The Flecktones, CeCe Winans, Keith Sweat, Jude Cole, Kirk Franklin, Gary Chapman, Avery Sunshine, Grace Kelly, Lindsey Stirling, Johnny Mathis, Loren Allred, Stephen Schwartz, Melissa Etheridge, Butch Walker, Larry Mullen Jr. of U2, Marc Broussard, Shoshana Bean, Ray Parker Jr., Sheléa, Randy Brecker, Ruben Studdard, Caroline Campbell, Sam Moore, James Francies, Mindi Abair, Jeff Coffin, Fourplay, Byron "Mr. TalkBox" Chambers and James "J.T." Taylor, among others.

== UNITE To Face Addiction Rally and Concert ==
In 2015, Gero served as Executive Producer for Facing Addiction's UNITE to Face Addiction Rally. The rally was a six-hour-long event that featured statements from celebrities, public officials and advocates as well musical performances by top artists. Rich Vos, from the hit comedy show "Last Comic Standing," hosted the event. President Barack Obama made remarks about treatment, prevention and recovery through a pre-recorded message shown at the event. The monumental rally was free to the public and took place on the National Mall in Washington, D.C. Attendees enjoyed musical performances by Joe Walsh, Steven Tyler with his Nashville-based band, Loving Mary, Sheryl Crow, Jason Isbell, The Fray, John Rzeznik of the Goo Goo Dolls, Jonathan Butler, Tommy Sims, Nathan East and Alex Newell of Glee. Guests also heard impactful messages from a variety of different speakers including U.S. Surgeon General Dr. Vivek H. Murthy, Director of National Drug Control Policy at the White House Michael Botticelli, Dr. Mehmet Oz, Allison Janney, Chuck Lorre, Darryl Strawberry, Patrick Kennedy, Chris Herren, Pat O'Brien, William Cope Moyers, Christopher Kennedy Lawford, Tara Conner, Dr. David Satcher, Senator Ed Markey, Senator Rob Portman, Dr. Lena Wen, Carol McDaid, Senator Angus King, Tom Coderre, John Silverman, Governor Bill Weld, Chef Natalie Young, Councilwoman Rosie Mendez, Elisa Hallerman, members of the Substance Abuse and Mental Health Services Administration (SAMHSA), National Institute on Drug Abuse (NIDA), and Food and Drug Administration (FDA), among others. In addition, Paul McCartney, Ringo Starr, Ozzy Osbourne, Michael McDonald, Kristin Davis, Glenn Beck, Chaka Khan, Andrew Zimmern, Colin Quinn, Laurie Dhue, Dr. John, Jodie Sweetin, Kristen Johnston, Craig Ferguson, Richie Sambora and Scott Stapp all filmed personal messages that were shown at the event. Yamaha Entertainment Group of America was a sponsor for the event, which was aired on PBS affiliate stations the following year.

== Recording & Album Production ==
Gero is GRAMMY nominated for Nathan East and an Emmy award winner for "The Gift." Gero has produced several albums, including LEOGUN's album, By The Reins, which was released in June 2013, LEOGUN's self-titled EP released in 2012, as well as an album from Pull Start Rockets released in July 2013.

Gero co-produced the solo debut album for bassist Nathan East, which was released on March 25, 2014 Nathan East features collaborations with Eric Clapton ("Can't Find My Way Home"), Stevie Wonder ("Overjoyed"), Michael McDonald ("Moondance"), Sara Bareilles ("I Can Let Go Now"), Ray Parker Jr. ("Daft Funk"), Bob James and Chuck Loeb of Fourplay, David Paich of Toto, Michael Thompson, Tom Scott, Jeff Babko and more. The album debuted at the top of Billboard's jazz charts and spent an unprecedented 36 weeks at the top of the SmoothJazz.com Top 50 chart, features the No. 1 jazz single and video "Daft Funk," and the single "101 Eastbound." It was nominated for a GRAMMY for Best Contemporary Instrumental Album. Gero and East teamed up again to produce East's second solo album Reverence, which was released in January 2017. The album received wide critical acclaim upon its release, and has since landed the number one spot on both the iTunes and Billboard jazz charts.

Gero produced the 2015 release The New Cool alongside GRAMMY honored jazz luminaries, keyboardist Bob James and bassist Nathan East, on Yamaha Entertainment Group. Recorded entirely in Nashville, Tennessee, the album was released on September 18, 2015. The New Cool initially debuted at No. 2 on Billboard's Current Contemporary Jazz Chart and jumped to the No.10 spot on JazzWeek's Top 50 Jazz Chart. The album is centered around piano and bass duets by James and East with a few handpicked classics, such as a new rendition of Willie Nelson's hit, "Crazy" which includes vocals from Vince Gill. The track "Ghost of a Chance" received a GRAMMY Award nomination under the Best Arrangement, Instrumental or A Cappella category.

== Film Direction ==
In 2000, Gero produced "Michael McDonald: A Gathering of Friends," a concert hosted by Jeff Bridges. The show consisted of McDonald performing duets with a variety of well known artists, including Patti LaBelle, Christopher Cross, James Ingram, Kenny Loggins, The Doobie Brothers and Jeff Bridges himself. A DVD of the concert was released on Image Entertainment a year later in 2001 and went on to become a PBS Special.

On September 29, 2012, Gero oversaw the filming of Sarah McLachlan's special encore performance for a Disklavier TV broadcast from her house in Canada. The performance footage was hosted on Disklavier TV so people who own Yamaha Disklavier pianos can have the piano reproduce her performance in their own homes.

Gero produced and directed the full length concert film of Elton John's "The Million Dollar Piano", which was released through Cinema Live on March 18 and March 26, 2014 in 1,200 movie theaters throughout the world. Gero also produced and directed the 2014 DVD "Making The Million Dollar Piano," an hour-long documentary on the making of the custom-designed Yamaha piano featured in Elton John's Las Vegas show, "Million Dollar Piano." A short form of the DVD is part of a bundle package with John's album "The Diving Board," released by Best Buy. Yamaha Entertainment Group also produced a DVD release of the live show. The DVD was released July 1, 2014 and distributed by Eagle Rock Entertainment.

Gero directed and produced "Nathan East For the Record" – a documentary about Nathan East, one of the most recorded bass players in the history of music. The 80-minute film showcases the recording of Nathan East's No.1 debut solo album, 30 years in the making. Eric Clapton, Quincy Jones, Phil Collins, Lionel Richie, Michael McDonald, Kenny Loggins, Vince Gill, David Foster and Don Was are among those featured. "Nathan East For the Record" has gone on to win over 15 awards to date.

== Philanthropy ==
Gero regularly supports a number of charities and charitable events through Yamaha Entertainment Group of America, including the Elton John AIDS Foundation, VH1 Save the Music Foundation, the TJ Martell Foundation, Autism Speaks, Heifer International and NAMM charities. In 2015, Gero was elected as President of the Sarah McLachlan School of Music Board of Directors.

Gero received the 2015 Noble Globe Award at the 4th Annual Heifer International Beyond Hunger: A Place At The Table gala event; an award honoring supporters of Heifer International who embody the charity's core values. The annual event focuses on raising awareness and resources for marginalized women and their families around the world. Heifer recognizes the integral role women have in feeding the world and believe there is no development strategy more beneficial to society than one that includes women as central players.

== Awards and recognition ==
| Year | Award | Project | Category | Result |
|---|---|---|---|---|
| 2015 | Accolade Global Film Competition | The Gift | Award of Excellence, Best Original Score (Composer) | Won |
| 2015 | Aurora Awards | The Gift | Platinum Award, Best Original Score (Composer) | Won |
| 2015 | Aurora Awards | The Gift | Platinum Award, Best of Show (Composer) | Won |
| 2015 | DAVEY Awards | The Gift | Best Music, Commercial Film (Composer) | Won |
| 2015 | DAVEY Awards | The Gift | Best Music, Online Video (Composer) | Won |
| 2015 | Emmy Awards | The Gift | Music Composer/Arranger | Won |
| 2015 | Hermes Creative Awards | The Gift | Platinum Award - Best Original Score (Composer) | Won |
| 2015 | IndieFest Film Awards | The Gift | Award of Excellence (Director) | Won |
| 2015 | MarCom Awards | The Gift | Best Original Music (Composer) | Won |
| 2015 | Videographer Awards | The Gift | Platinum Award, Best Original Score (Composer) | Won |
| 2016 | Albuquerque Film & Music Experience | Chris Gero | Visionary Award | Won |
| 2016 | Emmy Awards | Caroline Campbell - Yamaha Electric Violin | Director, Short Form | Won |
| 2016 | Emmy Awards | Caroline Campbell - Yamaha Electric Violin | Arts | Won |
| 2016 | Emmy Awards | Facing Addiction - It's Time | Community/Public Service Spot | Nominated |
| 2016 | Emmy Awards | The Company We Keep | Promo Spot/Image | Nominated |
| 2016 | Emmy Awards | The Company We Keep | Music Composer/Arranger | Nominated |
| 2016 | Flagler Film Festival | Nathan East: For The Record | Best Director | Nominated |
| 2016 | Nice International Film Festival | Nathan East: For The Record | Best Director | Nominated |
| 2017 | Emmy Awards | Heart of Inspiration | Music Composer/Arranger | Won |
| 2017 | Emmy Awards | Heart of Inspiration | Entertainment | Nominated |
| 2017 | Emmy Awards | Heart of Inspiration | Audio | Nominated |
| 2017 | Emmy Awards | Three Masters | Arts | Nominated |
| 2017 | Emmy Awards | The Right Note | Arts | Nominated |
| 2018 | Emmy Awards | The Passion for Music | Audio | Won |
| 2018 | Emmy Awards | The Passion for Music | Director/Short Form | Won |
| 2018 | Emmy Awards | The Passion for Music | Music Composer/Arranger | Won |
| 2018 | Emmy Awards | The Passion for Music | Entertainment | Nominated |
| 2018 | Emmy Awards | The Alchemy of Larry Mullen Jr. | Arts | Nominated |
| 2018 | Hermes Creative Awards | The Passion for Music | Platinum Award, Audio (Original Music) | Won |
| 2018 | Communicator Awards | The Passion for Music | Audio, Original Music | Won |
| 2018 | Communicator Awards | The Passion for Music | Online Video, Use of Music | Won |
| 2018 | Communicator Awards | The Passion for Music | Online Video, Branded Music | Won |
| 2018 | Telly Awards | The Passion for Music | Silver Award, Non Broadcast (Use of Music) | Won |
| 2018 | Telly Awards | The Passion for Music | Bronze Award, Branded Content (Use of Music) | Won |
| 2018 | Golden Award of Montreux | The Passion for Music | Gold Medal, Corporate Films (Music) | Won |
| 2018 | Aurora Awards | The Passion for Music | Platinum Best of Show. Original Music/Use of Music | Won |
