= 23rd GLAAD Media Awards =

Annual US media awards ceremony

The 23rd GLAAD Media Awards was the 2012 annual presentation of the GLAAD Media Awards, presented by the Gay & Lesbian Alliance Against Defamation honoring the 2011 season. The awards seek to honor films, television shows, musicians and works of journalism that fairly and accurately represent the LGBT community and issues relevant to the community. The 23rd Annual GLAAD Media Awards honored nominees in 25 English-language categories and 10 Spanish-language categories.

Awards were presented in three separate ceremonies: in New York City on March 24, 2012; in Los Angeles on April 21, 2012; and in San Francisco on June 2, 2012. The New York City awards were hosted by Naya Rivera and Cory Monteith, with special performances by Todd Alsup, Corey Craig, Whitney Day, and The Rockettes.

== Nominees ==
Winners are presented in bold.

=== English-language categories ===
Award	Winners and nominees
Outstanding Film - Wide Release	Albert Nobbs; **Beginners**; J. Edgar
Outstanding Film - Limited Release	**Pariah**; Circumstance; Gun Hill Road; Tomboy; Weekend
Outstanding Drama Series	Degrassi: The Next Generation; **Grey's Anatomy**; Pretty Little Liars; Shameless; Torchwood: Miracle Day
Outstanding Comedy Series	Exes and Ohs; Glee; Happy Endings; **Modern Family**; The Big C
Outstanding Individual Episode (in a series without a regular LGBT character)	"Acceptance" of Man Up!; **(tie) "Beards" of Hot in Cleveland**; **(tie) "Prom" of Drop Dead Diva**; "Recruited" of NCIS; "The Boy Has Style" of Are We There Yet?
Outstanding TV Movie or Mini-Series	**Cinema Verite**
Outstanding Documentary	**Becoming Chaz**; The Strange History of Don't Ask, Don't Tell; The World's Worst Place to be Gay?; Two Spirits; We Were Here
Outstanding Reality Program	**Dancing with the Stars**; Girls Who Like Boys Who Like Boys; The Glee Project; The Real L Word; The Voice
Outstanding Talk Show Episode	**"Coming Out on the Oprah Show: 25 Years of Unforgettable Guests" of The Oprah Winfrey Show**; "Chaz Bono" of Late Show with David Letterman; "Children & Teens Caught in the Wrong Bodies" of Anderson; "The Wedding of Scott Cronick & David Gorshein" of Conan; "Zach Wahls" of The Ellen DeGeneres Show
Outstanding Daily Drama	All My Children; **Days of Our Lives**
Outstanding TV Journalism - News Magazine	**"The 'Sissy Boy' Experiments" of Anderson Cooper 360**; "Day One" of The Rachel Maddow Show; "Finding Home" of In the Life; "GLBT in Texas" of Spotlight; "They Call it Corrective Rape" of World's Untold Stories
Outstanding TV Journalism Segment	**"Battle Against Bullying" of ABC World News with Diane Sawyer**; "Children of LGBT Parents" of MSNBC News Live; "Gay Dads Adopt 12 Kids" of Good Morning America; "Kye Allums" of Outside the Lines; "Split by Potential Deportation" of CNN Newsroom
Outstanding Newspaper Article	**"Led by the Child Who Simply Knew" by Bella English, The Boston Globe**; "AIDS @ 30" (series), Windy City Times [Chicago, Ill.]; "Coming Out to America," by Melanie Asmar, Westword [Denver, Colo.]; "Even on Religious Campuses, Students Fight for Gay Identity" by Erik Eckholm, The New York Times; "Local Lesbian Couple Navigates Life’s Daily Challenges as Parents" by Najla Amundson, The Forum of Fargo-Moorhead [Fargo, N.D.]
Outstanding Newspaper Columnist	**Frank Bruni, The New York Times**; Alfred Doblin, The Record [Bergen, N.J.]; Craig Wilson, USA Today; Maureen Dowd, The New York Times; Peg McEntee, The Salt Lake Tribune
Outstanding Newspaper Overall Coverage	**The New York Times**; Pioneer Press [St. Paul, Minn.]; The Boston Globe; The Oregonian [Portland, Ore.]; The Salt Lake Tribune
Outstanding Magazine Article	**(tie) "15th Anniversary of the Passage of the Defense of Marriage Act" (series) by Chris Geidner, Metro Weekly**; **(tie) "Black & Gay in Corporate America" by Carolyn M. Brown, Black Enterprise**; "Making It Work" by Rod McCullom, Ebony; "The Secret I Don't Want to Keep Anymore" by Janet Mock as told to Kierna Mayo, Marie Claire; "Transitions" by Eliza Gray, The New Republic
Outstanding Magazine Overall Coverage	**The Advocate/Out**; Entertainment Weekly; People; Time; US Weekly
Outstanding Digital Journalism Article	**"Adam and Pete: Love in a Time of War" by Max J. Rosenthal, HuffingtonPost.com**; "Black and Transgender: A Double Burden" by Kellee Terrell, TheRoot.com; "Soldier Leaves Legacy Much Larger Than 'He Was Gay'" by Wayne Drash, CNN.com; "The Rainbow Struggle" (series) GlobalPost.com; "What are Little Boys Made Of" by Jim Burroway, BoxTurtleBulletin.com
Outstanding Digital Journalism - Multimedia	**"Injustice at Every Turn" ITLMedia.org**; "Breaking Boundaries" by Eliza Gray, Joe Heroun and Margy Slattery, TheNewRepublic.com; "Coming Out" by Sarah Kramer and Nicole Bengiveno, NYTimes.com; "Glamorous Gay Dance Scene a 'Family Affair'" by Brooke Sopelsa, Drew Katchen and David Britt-Friedman, MSNBC.com; "Transgender: A Special Report" (series) TimesUnion.com [Albany, N.Y.]
Outstanding Blog	**(tie) Mombian**; **(tie) Towleroad**; Bilerico Project; New Civil Rights Movement; Rod 2.0
Outstanding Music Artist	**Lady Gaga, Born This Way, Interscope Records**; Beverly McClellan, Fear Nothing, Oarfin Records; Girl in a Coma, Exits & All the Rest, Blackheart Records; Hunx and His Punx, Too Young to Be in Love Hardly Art; MEN, Talk About Body, IAMSOUND Records
Outstanding Comic Book	**Batwoman by J.H. Williams III and W. Haden Blackman, DC Comics**; Avengers: The Children's Crusade by Allan Heinberg, Marvel; Secret Six by Gail Simone, DC Comics; Veronica Presents: Kevin Keller by Dan Parent, Archie Comics; X-Factor by Peter David, Marvel Comics
Outstanding Los Angeles Theatre	**No Word in Guyanese for Me by Wendy Graf**; Bonded by Donald Jolly; House of the Rising Son by Tom Jacobson; Killer Queen: The Story of Paco the Pink Pounder by Peter Griggs; Who's Your Daddy? by Johnny O'Callaghan
Outstanding New York Theatre: Broadway and Off-Broadway	**The Intelligent Homosexual's Guide to Capitalism and Socialism with a Key to the Scriptures by Tony Kushner**; Maple & Vine by Jordan Harrison; Priscilla Queen of the Desert: The Musical by Stephan Elliott and Allan Scott; Sons of the Prophet by Stephen Karam; Unnatural Acts: Harvard's Secret Court of 1920 conceived by Tony Speciale
Outstanding New York Theatre: Off-Off Broadway	**Southern Comfort, book and lyrics by Dan Collins, music by Julianne Wick Davis**; She Kills Monsters by Qui Nguyen; The Dog and Pony Show (Bring Your Own Pony) by Holly Hughes; The Escape Artist, book by John Kelly, songs by John Kelly & Carol Lipnik; The Momentum by Boo Killebrew, Geoffrey Decas O'Donnell & Jordan Seavey
Vito Russo Award	**Craig Zadan and Neil Meron**
Special Recognition Award	**Katy Butler**

=== Spanish-language categories ===
Award	Winners and nominees
Outstanding Novela	El Último Matrimonio Feliz Telefutura; **Las Aparicio Mun2**; Los Exitosos Gome$ Telemundo
Outstanding Daytime Talk Show Episode	**"Lesbianas celebran 10 años" Caso Cerrado, Telemundo**; "Por la novia de mi hija" Casos de Familia Univision; "Quiero su perdón antes de morir" ¿Quién Tiene la Razón? Telefutura
Outstanding Talk Show Interview	**"Entrevista con Raquel Gómez y Mony Ruiz Velasco" Al Punto, Univision**; "Brasil legaliza uniones civiles" Panorama Mundial CNN En Español; "Entrevista con Ricky Martin" Don Francisco Presenta Univision; "Entrevista con Ricky Martin" Noticiero con Paola Rojas Galavisión; "¿Asunto civil o religioso?" Conclusiones CNN En Español
Outstanding TV Journalism - News Magazine	**"Asesino" Primer Impacto, Univision**; "Conmovidos por la muerte de Jamey Rodemeyer" Paparazzi Magazine Mega TV; "Imperio Samy" Aquí y Ahora Univision; "Lo que los jóvenes callan" Despierta América Univision; "Peña Blaugrana de Gays y Lesbianas" SportsCenter: Reportaje Especial ESPN Deportes
Outstanding TV Journalism Segment	**"Ángeles del cambio" Noticiero 34, KMEX TV-34 [Los Angeles, California]**; "Luchan por igualdad" Noticiero Telemundo Telemundo; "Primer día" Noticiero Univision Univision; "Salir del clóset" Noticiero con Paola Rojas Galavisión; "Víctima de crimen de odio enfrenta deportación" Al Rojo Vivo Telemundo
Outstanding Newspaper Article	**(tie) "Casamiento e hijos biológicos para pareja gay hispana de EEUU" by Claudia Torrens, Associated Press**; **(tie) "Madre hay una sola, no necesariamente" by Virginia Gaglianone, La Opinión**; "'Cómplices del silencio' los gays en política electoral" by Israel Rodríguez, El Nuevo Día; "Contentos con el derecho para casarse" by Catalina Jaramillo, El Diario la Prensa; "Tensión migratoria de las parejas gay" by Fabiola Pomareda, La Raza
Outstanding Magazine Article	**"Nueva York ♥ la igualdad" by Michelle Oyola, People en Español**; "Perez Hilton el bloguero más popular en Hollywood" by Alejandra Chaparro, TV y Notas
Outstanding Digital Journalism Article	**"Las 7 señales de un niño transgénero" by Paula Andalo, Univision.com**; "Matrimonio gay es la pareja más atractiva de México" peopleenespanol.com; "Pareja gay en lucha migratoria de vida o muerte" Univision14.com; "Ricky Martin: salir del clóset le trajo éxito" peopleenespanol.com
Outstanding Music Artist	**Ricky Martin, Música + Alma + Sexo, Sony Music Latin**; Rita Indiana & Los Misterios, El Juidero Premium Latin Music
Special Recognition	**El Diario la Prensa**
