= Illumination (Earth, Wind & Fire album) =

Studio album by Earth, Wind & Fire
- Released: September 20, 2005
- Studios: The Village Recorder (Los Angeles, California); Magnet Vision Studios and Flyte Tyme West (Santa Monica, California); Blakeslee Recording Company and Larrabee North (North Hollywood, California); Paramount Recording Studios (Hollywood, California); Glenwood Place Studios and The Enterprise (Burbank, California); Firehouse Studios (Pasadena, California); Luminous Sound (Dallas, Texas); The Dungeon Recording Studios and Dungeon East (Atlanta, Georgia); MixStar Studios (Virginia Beach, Virginia); KeffenDeez Place (Philadelphia, Pennsylvania)
- Length: 60:04
- Label: Sanctuary
- Producers: Maurice White; Phillip Bailey; will.i.am; Jimmy Jam and Terry Lewis; Raphael Saadiq; Darren Henson & Keith Pelzer; Brian McKnight; Organized Noize

Earth, Wind & Fire chronology
| Love Songs (2004) | Illumination (2005) | Playlist: The Very Best of Earth, Wind & Fire (2008) |

Singles from Illumination
- 1. "The Way You Move" Released: 2004; 2. "Show Me The Way" Released: 2004; 3. "Pure Gold" Released: 2005; 4. "To You" Released: 2005

Illumination is the nineteenth studio album by American band Earth, Wind & Fire. It was released on September 20, 2005 by Sanctuary Records. Guest artists Big Boi, Kenny G, Kelly Rowland, will.i.am, Floetry and Brian McKnight are featured on Illumination. The album rose to number eight on the US Top R&B/Hip-Hop Albums chart and number 32 on the US Billboard 200 chart. Illumination was also Grammy nominated within the category of Best R&B Album. It is the final Earth, Wind & Fire album to feature their founder and co-lead vocalist Maurice White.

== Promotion ==
"The Way You Move" featuring Kenny G was issued as the album's lead single. it reached number 12 on the US Billboard Adult Contemporary Songs chart. Second single "Show Me the Way" featuring Raphael Saadiq rose to number 16 on the Adult R&B Songs chart. "Pure Gold," Illumination's third single, rose to number 23 on Billboard's Adult Contemporary singles chart and number 15 on the Adult R&B Songs chart. The fourth and final single "To You," which featured Brian McKnight, reached number 16 upon the US Adult R&B Songs chart and number 29 on the US Smooth Jazz Songs chart.

== Critical reception ==
Professional ratings
Aggregate scores
| Source | Rating |
|---|---|
| Metacritic | 79/100 |
Review scores
| Source | Rating |
| About | 4/5 stars |
| AllMusic | 4/5 stars |
| The Guardian | 4/5 stars |
| Rolling Stone | 3/5 stars |
| The Times | 4/5 stars |
| USA Today | 3/4 stars |

Illumination was met with generally positive reviews. At Metacritic, which assigns a normalized rating out of 100 to reviews from professional publications, the album received an average score of 79, based on 12 reviews. Bill Lamb of About gave the album a four out of five star rating. He found that Illumination was a "truly classic package" that "effortlessly straddles the divide between classic and contemporary R&B." Dave Simpson of The Guardian gave a four out of five star rating, describing the album as "an often storming return to form." Steve Jones of USA Today noted that with Illumination Earth, Wind & Fire was "as vibrant as ever." Jim Farber of The New York Daily News felt that "their latest work features production and/or guest appearances from current hit makers like Will I. Am from the Black Eyed Peas, Big Boi from OutKast, Kelly Rowland from Destiny's Child, plus Jimmy Jam and Terry Lewis, Raphael Saadiq and others. All these guests haven't overwhelmed Maurice White's great band. They've just freshened it up. Singer Philip Bailey sounds as buttery as ever, and the band's tart horn arrangements and melodies extend the buoyancy and pleasure of their hits."

Ben Thompson of The Daily Telegraph wrote "Illumination does find them successfully holding their own alongside some of the biggest names of the 21st century." David Wild of Rolling Stone proclaimed "Illumination, taps into Santana's now-familiar Supernatural formula: Give a veteran great a hip replacement by surrounding it with lots of gifted youngbloods. On Illumination, the formula works well largely because the parties involved — including Jimmy Jam and Terry Lewis, Raphael Saadiq and Black Eyed Peas' Will.i.am — seem to sincerely treasure the EWF sound. " Geoffrey Himes, writing for Washington Post, found that Illumination has "the right material and the right producers [...] The Earth, Wind & Fire voices and horns are given contagious hooks for their retro sound, while underneath, the producers cook up new beats for a new century." Raymond Fiore of Entertainment Weekly declared Illumination "a fluid, unforced marriage of modern beats and retro, horn-lined soul," while Antony Hatfield of BBC Music called the album a "great all star team effort, which should appeal to fans of all concerned."

=== Accolades ===
Illumination was Grammy nominated in the category of Best R&B Album. The album was also nominated for a Soul Train Music Award in the category of Best R&B/Soul Album – Group, Band or Duo. As well Earth, Wind & Fire was nominated for an NAACP Image Award in the category of Outstanding Duo or Group. "Show Me the Way" was also Grammy nominated in the category of Best R&B Performance by a Duo or Group with Vocals.

== Commercial performance ==
The album debuted and peaked at number 32 on the US Billboard 200 and number eight on the Top R&B/Hip-Hop Albums chart, with first week sales of 29,000 copies. It was Earth, Wind & Fire's highest-charting album since 1987's Touch the World. The album also peaked at number 61 on the Oricon Charts in Japan.

== Uses in other media ==
"This Is How I Feel" was featured in the movie Hitch and "Love's Dance" was featured in the feature film Robots. "Pure Gold" was featured in the movie Roll Bounce.

== Track listing ==
Illumination track listing
| No. | Title | Writer(s) | Producer(s) | Length |
|---|---|---|---|---|
| 1. | "Lovely People" (featuring will.i.am) | will.i.am; Keith Harris | will.i.am; Harris | 4:28 |
| 2. | "Pure Gold" | James Harris III; Terry Lewis; Tony L. Tolbert; Bobby Ross Avila; Issiah J. Avila | Jimmy Jam and Terry Lewis; Bobby Ross Avila & IZ | 4:40 |
| 3. | "A Talking Voice (Interlude)" (all vocals performed by Philip Bailey) | Bailey | Bailey | 0:19 |
| 4. | "Love's Dance" | Harris; Lewis; Tony L. Tolbert | Jimmy Jam and Terry Lewis | 4:28 |
| 5. | "Show Me the Way" (featuring Raphael Saadiq) | Saadiq; Taura Jackson | Saadiq | 7:47 |
| 6. | "This Is How I Feel" (featuring Kelly Rowland, Big Boi & Sleepy Brown) | Patrick Brown; Antwan Patton; Marqueze Ethridge; Ray Murray; Rico Wade | Organized Noize | 4:21 |
| 7. | "Work It Out" | Sir James Bailey; Jackson; Saadiq; Kelvin Wooten | Saadiq | 4:29 |
| 8. | "Pass You By" | Jackson; Saadiq | Saadiq | 4:59 |
| 9. | "The One" | Brandon "Shug" Bennett; Patrick Brown; Samuel Christian; Murray; Wade | Organized Noize | 5:11 |
| 10. | "Elevated" (featuring Floetry) | Marsha Ambrosius; Natalie Stewart; Darren Henson; Keith Pelzer | Henson; Pelzer | 4:37 |
| 11. | "Liberation" | Vikter Duplaix; Junius Bervine | Duplaix | 5:25 |
| 12. | "To You" (featuring Brian McKnight) | McKnight | McKnight | 4:37 |
| 13. | "The Way You Move" (with Kenny G) | Antwan Patton; Carlton Mahone Jr.; Brown | Saadiq | 4:36 |
| Total length: | | | | 60:04 |

Bonus tracks
| No. | Title | Writer(s) | Producer(s) | Length |
|---|---|---|---|---|
| 14. | "Love Together" (featuring Raphael Saadiq) | Saadiq; Harris | Saadiq | 4:18 |
| 15. | "Autumn" (featuring Musiq Soulchild) | | | 4:37 |
| 16. | "Let Me Love You" (featuring Floetry) |

2020 Reissue
| No. | Title | Writer(s) | Producer(s) | Length |
|---|---|---|---|---|
| 13. | "Love Together" | Kelvin Wooten; Saadiq; Rodney Smith | Saadiq | 4:18 |
| 14. | "The Way You Move" (with Kenny G) | Patton; Mahone; Brown | Saadiq | 4:36 |

Bonus tracks
| No. | Title | Writer(s) | Producer(s) | Length |
|---|---|---|---|---|
| 15. | "Lovely People" (instrumental) | will.i.am; Keith Harris | will.i.am; Harris | 4:29 |
| 16. | "Elevated" (instrumental) | Ambrosius; Stewart; Henson; Pelzer | Henson; Pelzer | 4:37 |

== Credits and personnel ==
Earth, Wind & Fire

- Philip Bailey – lead vocals (1, 2, 4, 8, 10, 13), backing vocals (1, 2, 4, 5, 8–10, 12, 13), percussion (1, 5, 11), all vocals (3, 7, 11), bongos (6)
- Maurice White – lead vocals (1, 2, 5, 8, 9, 12, 13), backing vocals (1, 2, 4, 5, 8, 9, 12, 13), kalimba (1, 4, 10), "Doca da Bella" (11)
- Myron McKinley – keyboards (11)
- Greg "G-Moe" Moore – guitars (11)
- Verdine White – bass (1, 2, 4, 6, 8, 11, 12)
- Ralph Johnson – additional percussion (11)
- Gary Bias – saxophones (1, 2, 4–9, 13)
- Reggie Young – trombone (1, 2, 4–9, 13)

Guest musicians

- will.i.am – programming (1)
- Keith Harris – keyboards (1), drums (1)
- Bobby Ross Avila – Rhodes electric piano (2), keyboards (2, 4), guitars (2, 4)
- Jimmy Jam – Rhodes electric piano (4)
- Kelvin Wooten – keyboards (5, 7), bass (7)
- Dave Robbins – keyboards (6)
- Organized Noize – music programming (6, 9), drum programming (6, 9)
- Sleepy Brown – acoustic piano (9)
- Darren Henson – all other instruments (10)
- Keith Pelzer – all other instruments (10)
- Junius Bervine – additional keyboards (11)
- Vikter Duplaix – additional keyboards (11), synth bass (11), drum programming (11)
- Brian McKnight – keyboards (12), guitars (12)
- Walter Afanasieff – keyboards (13), Hammond B3 organ (13), rhythm programming (13)
- Emanuel Kiriakou – programming (13), electric guitar (13)
- Raphael Saadiq – guitars (5, 7, 8), bass (5), percussion (5), acoustic piano (8), additional bass (8)
- Shorty B – guitars (6)
- Vadim Zilberstein – additional guitars (12)
- Preston Crump – additional bass (6)
- Issiah J. "IZ" Avila – drums (2, 4), percussion (2, 4)
- Khari Parker – drums (5)
- Bobby Ozuna – drums (7, 8), percussion (7, 8)
- Prescott "Glenn P" Ellison – drums (12)
- Neal Pogue – additional percussion (6)
- Peter Michael Escovedo – percussion (13)
- Kenny G – soprano saxophone (13)
- Jeff Bradshaw – trombone (10)
- Gary Grant – trumpet (1, 2, 4, 6, 9, 13)
- Jerry Hey – trumpet (1, 2, 4, 6, 9, 13)
- Bobby Rodriguez – trumpet (5)
- Nolan Shaheed – trumpet (7, 8)
- Matt Cappy – trumpet (10)
- South Central Chamber Orchestra – strings (9)

Background and Guest vocalists

- will.i.am – lead vocals (1), backing vocals (1)
- Prof T. – backing vocals (2, 4)
- Raphael Saadiq – lead vocals (5, 14), backing vocals (5, 8)
- Ron "Doc" Holiday – backing vocals (5, 8, 12)
- Big Boi – rap (6)
- Sleepy Brown – lead vocals (6), backing vocals (9)
- Kelly Rowland – lead vocals (6)
- Chimere Scott – backing vocals (9)
- Marsha Ambrosius (of Floetry) – backing vocals (10)
- Natalie Stewart (of Floetry) – lead vocals (10)
- Brian McKnight – lead vocals (12), backing vocals (12)

Music arrangements

- Keith Harris – horn arrangements (1)
- Jerry Hey – co-horn arrangements (1, 2, 4), horn orchestrations (6, 9), horn arrangements (13)
- Jimmy Jam – horn arrangements (2, 4)
- Bill Meyers – horn arrangements (5), orchestration arrangements (12)
- Kelvin Wooten – string arrangements (5)
- Raphael Saadiq – horn arrangements (7, 8)
- Ray Brown – horn orchestrations (7)
- Charles Veal Jr. – orchestral arrangements (9)
- Jeff Bradshaw – horn arrangements (10)
- Matt Cappy – horn arrangements (10)
- Walter Afanasieff – arrangements (13)

== Production ==
- Damien Smith – executive producer, A&R direction
- Philip Bailey – executive producer
- Maurice White – executive producer
- Montina Cooper – vocal producer for Kelly Rowland (6)
- Glenn Standridge – production coordinator (5, 7, 8)
- Dee Dee Murray – production coordinator (6, 9)
- Goldfinger C.S. – design
- Heavyweight – cover art
- Pamela Springsteen – photography, album image inspiration
- Davett Singletary – marketing consultant
- Mark Young – publicist
- Wayman Jones – promotion

Technical credits

- Brian Gardner – mastering at Bernie Grundman Mastering (Hollywood, California)
- Cameron Marcarelli – recording (1, 6, 9, 11, 12), horn recording (2, 4), mixing (11)
- Neal Pogue – mixing (1, 6, 9), recording (6, 9)
- Ian Cross – recording (2, 4)
- Matt Marrin – mixing (2, 4)
- Gerry Brown – recording (5)
- John Tanksley – recording (5)
- Manny Marroquin – mixing (5)
- Danny Romero – mixing (5, 7, 8), recording (7, 8)
- Chris Bell – recording (6, 9)
- Sean Davis – recording (6, 9)
- Cha Cha Jones – recording (6, 9)
- Ray Murray – recording (6, 9)
- Jimi Randolph – recording (6, 9, 12)
- Darren Henson – recording (10)
- Keith Pelzer – recording (10)
- Serban Ghenea – mixing (10)
- Chris Wood – recording (12)
- Dave Pensado – mixing (12)
- James Tanksley – assistant engineer (5, 7, 8)
- Chris Lowry – recording assistant (6)
- Alex Reverberi – recording assistant (6, 9)
- Tim Wentzlaff – assistant engineer (7)
- Nicolas Fournier – mix assistant (6, 9)
- John Hanes – mix assistant (10)
- Mary Ann Souza – assistant engineer (12)

== Charts ==
Weekly chart performance for Illumination
| Chart (2005) | Peak position |
|---|---|
| French Albums (SNEP) | 193 |
| Italian Albums (FIMI) | 87 |
| Japanese Album (Oricon) | 61 |
| US Billboard 200 | 32 |
| US Top R&B/Hip-Hop Albums (Billboard) | 8 |
