= Todd Alsup =

American singer-songwriter

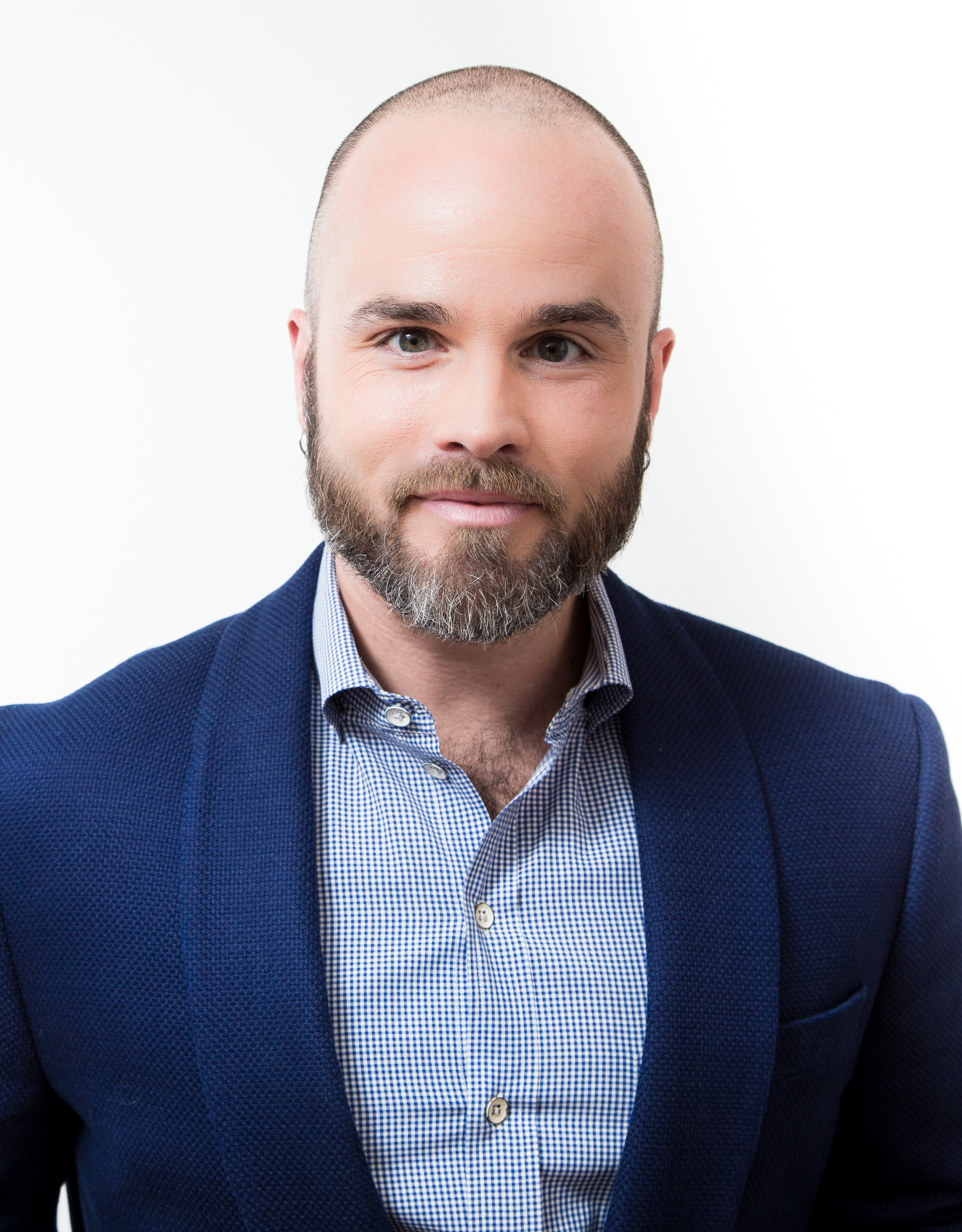
- Alsup in 2015

Background information
- Born: Pontiac, Michigan, United States
- Origin: New York City, United States
- Genres: pop, soul, singer-songwriter
- Occupations: singer-songwriter, pianist
- Instruments: voice, piano
- Years active: 2008–present
- Website: toddalsup.com

Todd Alsup is an American pianist and singer-songwriter based in New York City. He has been profiled in Billboard and Performing Songwriter and featured on MTV, PBS, and Sirius XM Radio. He has toured throughout the United States and Europe.

== Early life and education ==
Alsup was born and raised in Waterford, Michigan and began studying piano at the age of 11. He graduated from Waterford Mott High School and moved to New York City where he attended the Steinhardt School at New York University, graduating with a Bachelor of Music in vocal performance.

== Career ==
Alsup began performing his original songs in Manhattan clubs in 2007. His first EP release, Facts & Figures, was produced by Major Who Media and received favorable press, including features in Billboard and Performing Songwriter. In 2008, Alsup was selected to be a Yamaha Corporate Artist representing the Yamaha brand. In 2009, he began touring colleges and universities up and down the East Coast.

Alsup's follow-up LP, Todd Alsup (released in 2011), was produced by Steve Greenwell, Jeremy Sklarsky and James Walsh. The album features the singles "How I'm Made," "The Only Thing," and "Let's Have A Party" (which was featured on MTV's "The Real World: New Orleans).

In November 2010, Alsup's song "How I'm Made" became a Top 12 Finalist in the 5th Annual Songwriters Circle Contest in New York City. The song placed in the Top 5, prompting music industry blogger Bob Lefsetz to wrote, "If you think this guy has no talent you know nothing ... If this record came out when I was in college everybody would know who Todd Alsup was".

A club remix of the single "The Only Thing," produced by DJ Richard Cutmore was released in 2011, and "The Only Thing" won the 2012 OutMusic Award for "Pop Song of the Year."

In March 2012, Alsup was invited to perform at the 23rd GLAAD Media Awards in New York City. The following month he was invited by Yamaha to showcase at the company's annual entertainment conference.

Alsup is currently in the studio completing his third studio album. The project was funded in part by fans (known as the Todd Squad) via a successful Kickstarter campaign in April 2015. The work on this project was done across continents with Swiss producer Orlando Ribar. Much of the recording was done in Switzerland and additional recording was done at Threshold Studios in New York City.

== Discography ==
- 2008: Facts & Figures (EP)
- 2011: Todd Alsup (LP)
- 2011: The Only Thing (Cutmore Mixes)
- 2012: Todd Alsup Live at Sirius XM (EP)
