= Pure Gold (song) =

2005 single by Earth, Wind & Fire

Single by Earth, Wind & Fire

from the album Illumination
- Released: 2005
- Recorded: 2004
- Genre: R&B
- Length: 3:56
- Label: Sanctuary Records
- Songwriters: Bobby Ross Avila; Issiah J. Avila; Tony L. Tolbert; James Harris III; Terry Lewis
- Producer: Jimmy Jam & Terry Lewis

Earth, Wind & Fire singles chronology
"Show Me the Way" (2004)	"Pure Gold" (2005)	"To You" (2005)

"Pure Gold" is a song by the band Earth, Wind & Fire, released as a single in 2005 by Sanctuary Records. The song reached No. 23 on the Billboard Adult Contemporary chart and No. 15 on the Billboard Adult R&B Songs chart.

== Overview ==
"Pure Gold" was written by Bobby Ross Avila, Issiah J. Avila, Tony L. Tolbert, Jimmy Jam and Terry Lewis. The song also came off Earth, Wind & Fire's 2005 album Illumination.

== Critical reception ==
David Wild of Rolling Stone called the song "dreamy". Gene Stout of the Seattle Post Intelligencer described Pure Gold as a "soaring" tune. Bill Lamb of About proclaimed that "midway through Pure Gold, the (album)'s second track, the listener realizes once again what a gorgeous instrument Philip Bailey's voice is."

== Use in other media ==
"Pure Gold" appeared on the soundtrack of the 2005 feature film Roll Bounce.

== Charts ==
Chart (2005)	Peak position
U.S. Billboard Adult Contemporary	23
U.S. Billboard Hot R&B/Hip-Hop Songs	76
U.S. Billboard Adult R&B Songs	15
