= Earth, Wind & Fire: In Concert =

Video by Earth, Wind & Fire
- Released: 1982
- Recorded: 1981
- Length: 60 min.
- Label: Vestron, Eagle Rock Entertainment
- Director: Michael Schultz

Earth, Wind & Fire chronology
Earth, Wind & Fire: In Concert (1982)	The Eternal Vision (1992)

Earth, Wind & Fire: In Concert is a concert by the band Earth, Wind & Fire that was issued on video. The concert rose to No. 40 on the Billboard Top Music Video Sales chart.

== Overview ==
Earth, Wind & Fire: In Concert was recorded at the Oakland Coliseum on December 30–31, 1981.

The concert was at first broadcast in August 1982 on HBO and later released in 1984 on VHS by Vestron Video. As well the concert was re-issued on DVD in 2008 by Eagle Rock Entertainment.

== Critical reception ==
Richard Marcus of Blogcritics noted that Earth, Wind & Fire: In Concert was "everything I could have hoped [sic] for". Heather Phares of Allmusic gave the DVD a three out of five star rating and exclaimed that "In Concert should please diehards looking to add another EW&F concert video (along with Live in Japan) to their collection." Jeffrey Kauffman of DVD Talk proclaimed "EW&F cut such a wide swath through so many genres in its heyday that this concert DVD may well appeal to an audience outside of core EW&F fans. Though it's a bit dated, the music is so strong that any occasional silliness in the visual presentation is easily overcome. Recommended."

== Set list ==
No.	Title	Length
1.	"Kalimba Tree (interlude)/ Let Your Feelings Show"
2.	"In The Stone"
3.	"Fantasy"
4.	"Sing a Song"
5.	"Reasons"
6.	"Remember The Children, Where Have All The Flowers Gone, Shining Star, Keep Your Head to the Sky, Devotion"
7.	"Gratitude"
8.	"That's the Way of the World"
9.	"I've Had Enough"
10.	"Jupiter (The Battle)"
11.	"Let's Groove"
