= Spend the Night (Earth, Wind & Fire song) =

Single by Earth, Wind & Fire

from the album Millennium
- B-side: "Even If You Wonder"
- Released: 1993
- Genre: R&B
- Label: Reprise
- Songwriter: Dawn Thomas
- Producer: Maurice White

Earth, Wind & Fire singles chronology
"Wanna Be the Man" (1990)	"Spend the Night" (1993)	"Sunday Morning" (1993)

"Spend the Night" is a song recorded by American band Earth, Wind & Fire, released in 1993 by Reprise Records as the first single from their sixteenth album, Millennium (1993). The song reached No. 36 on the US Billboard Adult R&B Songs chart and No. 33 on the Oricon Japanese Pop Singles chart.

== Overview ==
"Spend the Night" was produced by Maurice White and composed by Dawn Thomas. The single's B-side was "Even If You Wonder". Both tracks are from the group's 1993 studio album Millennium.

== Critical reception ==
Larry Flick of Billboard called the song "A shining moment from the group's fine Millennium album". Derek Ali of the Dayton Daily News noted "Cult fans can still mouth the words to classic Earth, Wind & Fire hits..Now they can learn the words to...Spend the Night."
