= The New Cool (Bob James and Nathan East album) =

Studio album by Bob James and Nathan East
- Released: September 18, 2015
- Recorded: 2014–2015
- Studio: Yamaha Entertainment Group Studios (Franklin, Tennessee); Blackbird Studios, House of Blues, The Tracking Room and Ocean Way Nashville (Nashville, Tennessee)
- Genre: Jazz
- Label: Yamaha Entertainment Group
- Producer: Bob James, Nathan East, Chris Gero, Bryan Lenox

Bob James chronology
Rhodes Scholar: Jazz-Funk Classics 1974-1982 (2013)	The New Cool (2015)	Silver (Fourplay) (2015)

Nathan East chronology
Nathan East (2014)	The New Cool (2015)	Silver (Fourplay) (2015)

The New Cool is a jazz album by pianist Bob James and bassist Nathan East, both members of the group Fourplay released in September 2015 by the Yamaha Entertainment Group. The album reached No. 2 on the Billboard Contemporary Jazz Albums chart and No. 5 on the Billboard Jazz Albums chart.

== Track listing ==
All tracks composed by Bob James; except where indicated

1. “The New Cool” - 7:08
2. “Oliver’s Bag” (Nathan East, Jeff Babko) - 5:07
3. “All Will Be Revealed” - 4:32
4. “Midnight Magic/Love Me As Though There Were No Tomorrow” (James/Harold Adamson, Jimmy McHugh) - 5:14
5. “Crazy” (featuring Vince Gill) (Willie Nelson) - 5:04
6. “How Deep Is the Ocean” (Irving Berlin) - 4:35
7. “Canto Y La Danza” (East, Babko) - 5:06
8. “Waltz for Judy” (East, Babko) - 3:27
9. “Seattle Sunrise” - 4:10
10. “Ghost of a Chance” (Bing Crosby, Ned Washington, Victor Young) - 5:23
11. “Turbulence” - 3:51
12. “House of Blue” (U.S. bonus track)

== Personnel ==
- Bob James – acoustic piano, keyboards, arrangements and conductor
- Nathan East – bass, vocals
- Scott Williamson – drums
- Rafael Padilla – percussion
- David Davidson – concertmaster
- The Nashville Recording Orchestra – orchestra
- Vince Gill – vocals (5)

=== Production ===
- Nathan East – producer
- Bob James – producer
- Chris Gero – producer
- Bryan Lenox – producer, recording, mixing
- Austin Atwood – assistant engineer
- Sean Badum – assistant engineer
- Moogie Canazio – assistant engineer
- Jasper LeMaster – assistant engineer
- Christopher Wilkinson – assistant engineer
- Bernie Grundman – mastering at Bernie Grundman Mastering (Hollywood, California)
- Sterling Koerpel – record coordinator
- Sonny Abelardo Management – management
- Henry Somero – personal manager
- Debbie Johnson – personal assistant
- Alysse Gafkjen – photography
- Amy Fucci – packaging layout, design
- Julie Callihan – stylist, hair, make-up
