= Concert production =

Concert production is the act of putting on a concert or a live music performance. As an individual's role, this refers to the person coordinating all the staff and equipment necessary to make a concert happen; they monitor the schedule, pay the staff, act as a hub for communication between team members, and generally make sure the event runs smoothly. The role of a concert producer or concert promoter is best filled by a person with good organizational skills, a diplomatic demeanor, and plenty of charisma. As a company's role, concert production may also include the responsibility of booking the musicians, marketing the concert, and the financial loss or gain of the event. Over the last 10 years, the number of independent concert producers in the United States has diminished greatly due to acquisition of smaller firms by large national companies.
