= Show Me the Way (Earth, Wind & Fire song) =

Single by Earth, Wind & Fire feat. Raphael Saadiq

from the album Illumination
- Released: September 2004
- Recorded: 2004
- Genre: R&B
- Length: 4:40
- Label: Sanctuary
- Songwriters: Raphael Saadiq, Taura Jackson
- Producer: Raphael Saadiq

Earth, Wind & Fire singles chronology
"The Way You Move" (2004)	"Show Me the Way" (2004)	"Pure Gold" (2005)

Raphael Saadiq singles chronology
"Chic Like You" (2004)	"I Want You Back" (2004)

"Show Me the Way" is a song recorded by the band Earth, Wind & Fire featuring Raphael Saadiq that was released as a single in September 2004 by Sanctuary Records. from their 2005 album Illumination. The single reached No. 16 on the Billboard Adult R&B Songs chart.

== Critical reception ==
David Wild of Rolling Stone described the song as "characteristically dreamy". Rob Theakston of AllMusic noted that "the crown jewel of the album is unquestionably the eight-minute jam "Show Me the Way". Anthony Hatfield of the BBC called the track "a highlight with its easy groove packaged in a neat, modern arrangement". People described "Show Me the Way" as a "lush ballad".

== Accolades ==
The band was nominated for a Grammy in the category of Best R&B Performance by a Duo or Group with Vocals for their performance of the song.
