= Thinking of You (Earth, Wind & Fire song) =

Single by Earth, Wind & Fire

from the album Touch the World
- B-side: "Money Tight"
- Released: January 1988
- Recorded: 1987
- Genre: R&B; dance-pop
- Length: 3:54 (single version); 4:41 (album version)
- Label: Columbia
- Songwriters: Wayne Vaughn; Wanda Vaughn; Maurice White
- Producer: Maurice White

Earth, Wind & Fire singles chronology
"You and I" (1987)	"Thinking of You" (1988)	"Evil Roy" (1988)

Music video
- "Thinking of You" on YouTube

"Thinking of You" is a song by American band Earth, Wind & Fire, released in January 1988 on Columbia Records as the third single from their fourteenth studio album, Touch the World (1987). It reached number one on the US Billboard Hot Dance Music/Club Play chart and number three on the Billboard Hot Soul Singles chart.

== Overview ==
"Thinking of You" was produced and arranged by Maurice White. White also composed the song alongside Wayne Vaughn and Wanda Vaughn of the Emotions. Thinking of You came off EWF's 1987 album Touch The World.

"Thinking of You" spent two weeks atop the Billboard Hot Dance/Club Play chart in 1988.

During January 1988 a four minute long music video was issued by Columbia. The video was directed by David Hogan.

== Critical reception ==
Phyl Garland of Stereo Review declared "and for that one unforgettably great song that graces every EW&F album, the candidate this time is Thinking of You, with its strutting rhythms, sassy horns and spirited vocal interplay". Harry Sumrall of the San Jose Mercury-News wrote "Thinking of You, is one of those seamless pop items that the group has always churned out with effortless ease."Jon Pareles of the New York Times also discerned "a midtempo groove and the sound of a kalimba (thumb piano) now synthesized".

== Personnel ==
- Maurice White: songwriter, arranger, producer, lead vocals
- Wanda Vaughn: songwriter, background vocals
- Wayne Vaughn: songwriter, arranger, sequence programming
- Rhett Lawrence: drum programming, synthesizer, Fairlight CMI programming
- Ray Fuller: guitar
- Philip Bailey, Jeanette W. Williams: background vocals

== Charts ==
Chart (1988)	Peak position
Finland (Suomen virallinen lista)	23
UK Top Pop (Music Week)	94
US Billboard Hot 100	67
US Hot Dance Club Play (Billboard)	1
US Hot Dance Music/Maxi-Singles Sales (Billboard)	1
US Hot Black Singles (Billboard)	3
