= Serpentine Fire =

1977 single by Earth, Wind & Fire

Single by Earth, Wind & Fire

from the album All 'N All
- B-side: "Serpentine Fire (Instrumental)"
- Released: October 15, 1977
- Recorded: 1977
- Genre: Funk
- Length: 3:50
- Label: Columbia
- Songwriters: Maurice White; Verdine White; Reginald "Sonny" Burke
- Producer: Maurice White

Earth, Wind & Fire singles chronology
| "On Your Face" (1977) | "Serpentine Fire" (1977) | "Fantasy" (1978) |

Music video
- "Serpentine Fire" on YouTube

"Serpentine Fire"
Earth, Wind & Fire's "Serpentine Fire" from All 'N All

"Serpentine Fire" is a single by Earth, Wind & Fire that was issued in October 1977 by Columbia Records. The single rose to numbers 1 and 13 on the Billboard Hot Soul Songs and Hot 100 charts, respectively.

== Overview ==
"Serpentine Fire" spent seven weeks atop the Billboard Hot Soul Songs chart and was named the R&B single of the year by Billboard. The song was produced by bandleader Maurice White for Kalimba Productions and arranged by Tom Tom 84. "Serpentine Fire" was composed by Maurice, Verdine White and Reginald 'Sonny' Burke. An instrumental version of "Serpentine Fire" was the b-side of this single. "Serpentine Fire" came off of EWF's 1977 album All 'n All.

During October 1977, the music video for "Serpentine Fire" was issued by Columbia.

== Critical reception ==
The Guardian declared "songs such as Serpentine Fire and Jupiter run on sheer adrenaline". Ed Hogan of AllMusic called the tune "a poppin mid-tempo jam". Joe McEwen of Rolling Stone exclaimed "Serpentine Fire, a song about the spinal life-center philosophy of many Eastern religions, is a simple tango spiced by a subtle funk base and the incessant clanging of a cowbell." Phyl Garland of Stereo Review also described the song as "a high stepper guaranteed to set even the most sluggish soul into motion". Record World said that "The sound is the thing here, with percussion, guitars and brass creating an infectious rhythmic environment for a basic, frequently-repeated lyric."

== Charts ==
| Year | Chart | Peak position |
|---|---|---|
| 1977 | U.S. Billboard Hot 100 | 13 |
| 1977 | U.S. Billboard Hot R&B Singles | 1 |
| 1977 | New Zealand Pop Songs | 32 |
| 1978 | RPM Top Canadian Singles | 13 |

== Accolades ==
| Publication | Country | Accolade | Year | Rank |
|---|---|---|---|---|
| Dave Marsh | U.S. | The 1001 Greatest Singles Ever Made | 1989 | 307 |
| Bruce Pollock | U.S. | The 7,500 Most Important Songs of 1944-2000 | 2005 | * |
| pc muñoz | U.S. | Verse-Chorus-Verse: A Column Dedicated to Great Songs | 2005 | * |
| Mark Ellingham | U.S. | The Rough Guide Book of Playlists: 5,000 Songs You Must Download | 2007 | * |

(*) designates lists that are unordered.

== Cover versions ==
=== Nathan East version featuring Philip Bailey, Verdine White and Ralph Johnson ===
"Serpentine Fire"

Single by Nathan East featuring Philip Bailey, Verdine White and Ralph Johnson

from the album Reverence
- Released: 2016
- Label: Yamaha Entertainment Group
- Songwriters: Maurice White, Verdine White, Reginald "Sonny" Burke

In December 2016, bass guitarist Nathan East released a cover of "Serpentine Fire" featuring Philip Bailey, Verdine White and Ralph Johnson as a single via Yamaha Entertainment Group. The song reached No. 17 on the Billboard Smooth Jazz Songs chart.

==== Critical reception ====
Andy Kellman of AllMusic proclaimed "Serpentine Fire" gets an ornate update with Bailey and EW&F partners Verdine White and Ralph Johnson. Phil Collins' drums and Eric Clapton's guitar are dredged from the master recording of an abandoned project, lost for 25 years, that was found in Patti Austin's basement by East's engineer."

==== Charts ====
| Year | Chart | Peak position |
|---|---|---|
| 2016 | US Billboard Smooth Jazz Songs | 17 |

=== Other covers ===
"Serpentine Fire" has also been covered by artists such as Jimmy Smith on his 1978 album Unfinished Business and Tom Scott on his 1990 album Them Changes. Brian Culbertson covered the song on his 2003 album Come On Up and Jack DeJohnette recorded another version with Ravi Coltrane and Matthew Garrison for his 2015 album In Movement.
