= Wanna Be the Man =

1990 song by Earth, Wind & Fire

Single by Earth, Wind & Fire featuring MC Hammer

from the album Heritage
- Released: 1990
- Genre: R&B
- Length: 4:08
- Label: Columbia
- Songwriters: Kellee Patterson; MC Hammer; Maurice White; Sheldon Reynolds; Verdine White
- Producer: Maurice White

Earth, Wind & Fire featuring MC Hammer singles chronology
"For the Love of You" (1990)	"Wanna Be the Man" (1990)	"Spend the Night" (1993)

Music video
- "Wanna Be The Man" on YouTube

"Wanna Be the Man" is a single by the band Earth, Wind & Fire featuring MC Hammer, issued in 1990 on Columbia Records. The single peaked at No. 41 on the Cashbox Top R&B Singles chart and No. 46 on the Billboard Hot R&B Singles chart.

== Critical reception ==
John Milward of Rolling Stone said the song is "sweetened by a buoyant vocal-group hook". Mitchell May of the Chicago Tribune wrote "Hammer's clipped delivery meshes so well with EWF's leaner sound that they might want to consider hiring him full-time". Bruce Britt of the Los Angeles Daily News wrote "'Wanna Be The Man' is great feel-good funk complete with a rapid fire rap by M.C. Hammer". J.D. Considine of the Baltimore Sun exclaimed "Take a tune like 'Wanna Be the Man' with its bouncy chorus, tight falsetto harmonies and intoxicating swirl of percussion, it has all the earmarks of an EW&F classic. Yet by toughening up the beat and tossing in a little rapping (by M.C. Hammer, no less), it seems as vital as anything on the charts. Now, how's that for understanding your heritage?". Pablo Guzman of the New York Daily News said "The pairing with M.C. Hammer on Wanna Be The Man" is "a kicking one". James T. Jones IV of USA Today found that "EWF smartly gets help from MC Hammer on the hard-edged Wanna Be the Man".
