= Evil Roy =

Single by Earth, Wind & Fire

from the album Touch the World
- B-side: "Evil Roy (Instrumental)"
- Released: 1988
- Recorded: 1987
- Genre: R&B
- Length: 4:01 (single version); 4:54 (album version)
- Label: Columbia
- Songwriter(s): Philip Bailey; Attala Zane Giles; Allee Willis
- Producer(s): Maurice White

Earth, Wind & Fire singles chronology
| "Thinking of You" (1988) | "Evil Roy" (1988) | "Turn on (The Beat Box)" (1988) |

"Evil Roy" is a single by R&B/funk band Earth, Wind & Fire issued in 1988 by Columbia Records. The song rose to No. 22 on the Billboard Hot R&B/Hip-Hop Singles & Tracks chart and No. 38 on the Billboard Dance Club Songs chart.

== Overview ==
"Evil Roy" was produced by EWF bandleader Maurice White and composed by Philip Bailey, Attala Zane Giles and Allee Willis. The song came off the band's 1987 studio album Touch the World.

A music video was issued in 1988 to accompany the single.

== Critical reception ==
David Emerson of The Boston Globe described "Evil Roy" as having "a menacing bass line". Harry Sumrall of the San Jose Mercury-News stated "Evil Roy, gets down, just as the title cut assumes a loftier tone, lyrically, while funking out."

== Personnel ==
- Maurice White: lead vocals, background vocals
- Philip Bailey: songwriter, lead vocals, background vocals
- Allee Willis: songwriter
- Attala Zane Giles: songwriter, producer, synthesized bass, synthesizer, synth arranger, guitar, percussion programming, background vocals
- Sheldon Reynolds: guitar
- Rhett Lawrence: Fairlight CMI programming, sequencing, drum programming

== Chart positions ==
| Chart (1988) | Peak position |
|---|---|
| U.S. Hot Dance Music/Club Play | 38 |
| U.S. Billboard Hot R&B/Hip-Hop Singles & Tracks | 22 |
