= System of Survival =

Single by Earth, Wind & Fire

Single by Earth, Wind & Fire

from the album Touch the World
- B-side: "Writing on the Wall"
- Released: September 22, 1987
- Recorded: 1987
- Genre: R&B
- Length: 4:08 (single version); 4:59 (album version)
- Label: Columbia
- Songwriter: Skylark
- Producers: Maurice White, Preston Glass

Earth, Wind & Fire singles chronology
"Boogie Wonderland (Remix)" (1986)	"System of Survival" (1987)	"You and I" (1987)

Music video
- "System of Survival" on YouTube

"System of Survival" is a song by the band Earth, Wind & Fire issued as a single in September 22, 1987 on Columbia Records. The single reached number one on both the Billboard Hot Dance Music/Club Play chart and Billboard Hot R&B Singles chart. "System of Survival" also reached No. 9 on the New Zealand Pop Singles chart, No. 14 on the Dutch Pop Singles chart and No. 25 on the Belgian Pop Singles chart.

== Overview ==
"System of Survival" was produced by Maurice White and Preston Glass and written by a black songwriter known as Skylark, who gave a demo tape containing the song to White while sitting in his Cadillac in the Studio D parking lot.

The single's B-side was a non-album song called "Writing on the Wall". "System of Survival" was released on EWF's 1987 studio album Touch the World.

== Critical reception ==
Jon Pareles of the New York Times described the song as having "a groove out of James Brown by way of Prince". Andrew Panos of Number One gave the song a four out of five star rating saying "The layoff has seen the EWF lads gain a bit of a social conscience as they sing here of the sufferings of the world and what a depressing place it is. You can however, ease your troubles if you have a nip out onto the dancefloor once in a while and jig along to splendid thumping disco tunes such as this". John Milward of USA Today proclaimed that the song "boasts a clean dance groove". Richard Lowe of Smash Hits wrote "now they've back with a thumping great funk thing called System of Survival which is all about how terrible a place the world is and all that and how strutting one's 'stuff' is quite a good way of enjoying yourself despite it all. Just to make it more modern and 'trendy' they've got this bit with someone talking on the radio on it, and its going to be a roaring success, which is only right and 'proper'."

Chris Heim of the Chicago Tribune found that "the ebullient celebration of everyone as a Shining Star has given way to the grimmer task of constructing a System of Survival". Robert Christgau of the Village Voice called the tune "the strongest protest this seminal pop transcendentalist has ever gotten down. Dave Hill of The Independent exclaimed "System of Survival is a blissfully erudite single." Harry Sumrall of the San Jose Mercury-News exclaimed "System of Survival is a scathing political/social commentary in the context of boiling rhythms and lithe vocal acrobatics." Connie Johnson of the Los Angeles Times declared that the tune is "packed with energy and passion". Simon Witter of NME called the song "horn parping, electro-bass romping, nasal howl-rolling bliss". Roe Hoeburger of Rolling Stone also described the song as "a Stayin' Alive for the eighties".

== Credits ==
- Producer: Preston Glass & Maurice White
- Composer: Skylark
- Additional Background Vocals: Skylark
- Background Vocals: Philip Bailey & Maurice White
- Lead Vocals: Philip Bailey & Maurice White
- Horns: Marc Russo, Wayne Wallace, Gary Grant & Jerry Hey
- Horn Arrangement: Jerry Hey
- Additional Drum Programming: Preston Glass
- Synthesizer: Preston Glass
- Guitar: Preston Glass
- Synthesizer Programming: Skylark
- Drum Programming: Skylark

== Charts ==
Chart (1987)	Peak position
Belgian Singles Ultratop 50	25
Blues & Soul Top British Soul Songs	17
Dutch Single Top 100	14
Italy Airplay (Music & Media)	6
New Zealand RIANZ Top 40 Singles	9
UK Singles	52
U.S. Billboard Hot 100	60
U.S. Billboard Hot Dance Club Play	1
U.S. Billboard Hot Dance Music/Maxi-Singles Sales	1
U.S. Billboard Hot Black Singles	1

== Accolades ==
Year	Country	Publication	Accolade	Rank
1987	U.S	Village Voice	Dean's List	19
