= Touch the World =

Studio album by Earth, Wind & Fire
- Released: October 30, 1987
- Recorded: 1987
- Studios: Studio Ultimo (Los Angeles, California): Studio D (Sausalito, California); Different Fur (San Francisco, California); Soundcastle (Hollywood, California); Larrabee, Amigo, and Lighthouse (North Hollywood, California)
- Genres: R&B; dance
- Length: 42:47
- Label: Columbia
- Producers: Maurice White: Preston Glass; Bill Meyers; Philip Bailey (co-producer); Wayne Vaughn (co-producer)

Earth, Wind & Fire chronology
The Collection (1986)	Touch the World (1987)	The Best of Earth, Wind & Fire, Vol. 2 (1988)

Singles from Touch the World
- 1. "System of Survival" Released: September 22, 1987; 2. "You and I" Released: December 1, 1987; 3. "Thinking of You" Released: January 5, 1988; 4. "Evil Roy" Released: March 22, 1988

Touch the World is the fourteenth studio album by American band Earth, Wind & Fire, released on October 30, 1987, through Columbia Records. The album reached No. 3 on the Billboard Top R&B Albums chart and No. 33 on the Billboard Top Pop Albums chart. Touch the World was certified Gold in the US by the RIAA.

== Overview ==
Touch the World was produced by Earth, Wind & Fire leader Maurice White. Artists such as George Duke, Marc Russo and Ricky Lawson of Yellowjackets, Jeff Porcaro of Toto and Edwin Hawkins, Walter Hawkins, and Lynette Hawkins Stephens with the Hawkins Family appeared on the album.

This LP ended a four-year hiatus for the band, with Maurice White reforming the group by bringing back longtime members Verdine White, Philip Bailey, Andrew Woolfolk and Ralph Johnson. Touch the World marked the debut of former Commodores guitarist Sheldon Reynolds to the lineup while Sonny Emory went on to fill the drum chair.

== Singles ==
"System of Survival" was written by a black songwriter known as Skylark that gave a demo tape containing the song to White while sitting in his Cadillac in the Studio D parking lot. Coming off the album as a single, the tune reached number one on both the Billboard Hot R&B Songs and Dance Club Songs charts. System of Survival was also nominated for a Soul Train Award for Best R&B/Soul Single – Group, Band or Duo. Another single, "Thinking of You" reached number one on the Billboard Dance Club Songs chart and peaked at number 3 on the Billboard Hot R&B Songs chart.

== Reception ==
Professional ratings
Review scores
Source	Rating
AllMusic	3/5 stars
Los Angeles Times	3/4 stars
New Musical Express	7/10
The Philadelphia Inquirer	3/4 stars
Record Mirror	3/5 stars
Rolling Stone	3/5 stars
San Jose Mercury News	3/4 stars
Stereo Review	(favourable)
USA Today	(favourable)
The Village Voice	B+

David Emerson of The Boston Globe called Touch the World "one of their toughest and most convincing records ever". With a 3 out of 4 stars rating Connie Johnson of the Los Angeles Times declared "Touch the World, while not great, is still good enough to further secure EWF's niche in pop/funk history". Chris Heim of the Chicago Tribune wrote: "Sweet and silky ballads, the distinctive vocals of Maurice White and Philip Bailey, and an overall air of humanitarian concern continue to be obvious group hallmarks. But there is a tougher, sadder and more predictible atmosphere here as the group discovers it hasn`t been so easy to Getaway from grim realities." People described the LP as "a class operation and an attractive return" that "can stand on its own merits." With a 3 out of 4 stars rating Ken Tucker of The Philadelphia Inquirer called Touch the World "the best album this vocal group has released since 'That's the Way of the World".

Jon Pareles of The New York Times noted that "Touch the World aims for hits by grafting old Earth, Wind and Fire trademarks..onto up to date arrangements and current concerns". David Quantick of New Musical Express stated "the toughness of the title track pervades much of the..LP and to the good". He also pointed out that "you the hipster can buy this record and liven up your evenings no end." Roe Hoeburger of Rolling Stone gave a 3 out of 5 stars rating and found "Bailey’s falsetto sounds as pure and piercing as ever, but he often needs White’s sly, low counterpunch to bring him back from the stratosphere." Hoeburger added "Yet White and Bailey’s words were always simple, delivered with a lot of pride and passion, enough of which they’ve regained to make Earth, Wind and Fire once more significant and timely." With a three out of four star rating Harry Sumrall of the San Jose Mercury News wrote "Touch the World is a potent reminder of what funk is all about. Maurice White and his mates have made a record that hits at the solar plexus - like all funk should - but also at the mind and ear." Pamela Bloom of High Fidelity proclaimed "Touch the World is nothing if not contemporary (but)..the message, as always, is stop, step back, and turn up your light".

Robert K. Oermann of USA Today ranked the album at No. 6 on his list of 1987's top 50 R&B albums. Touch the World was nominated for a Soul Train Award in the category of Best R&B/Soul Album – Group, Band or Duo.

== Track listing ==
Side one
No.	Title	Writer(s)	Length
1.	"System of Survival"	Skylark	4:59
2.	"Evil Roy"	Philip Bailey, Attala Zane Giles, Allee Willis	4:51
3.	"Thinking of You"	Wayne Vaughn, Wanda Vaughn, Maurice White	4:41
4.	"You and I"	Mark Mueller, Robbie Nevil	4:03
5.	"Musical Interlude: New Horizons"	Bill Meyers	2:01

Side two
No.	Title	Writer(s)	Length
6.	"Money Tight"	Danny Sembello, Maurice White, Allee Willis	4:36
7.	"Every Now and Then"	Jon Lind, Brock Walsh	4:21
8.	"Touch the World"	Rev. Oliver W. Wells	5:15
9.	"Here Today and Gone Tomorrow"	Philip Bailey, Marti Sharron, Glen Ballard	3:59
10.	"Victim of the Modern Heart"	Ian Prince	3:48

== Credits ==
Earth, Wind & Fire

- Philip Bailey – lead vocals (1, 2, 4, 8, 9), backing vocals (1–4, 6, 7, 9, 10)
- Maurice White – lead vocals (1–3, 6–8, 10), backing vocals (1, 2, 4, 6, 7, 9, 10), vocoder (1)
- Sheldon Reynolds – guitars (2, 8–10), lead guitar (6)
- Verdine White – bass (pictured in group photo but does not play on the album)
- Andrew Woolfolk – saxophone solo (5)

Additional musicians

- Skylark – synthesizer programming (1), drum programming (1), additional backing vocals (1)
- Preston Glass – synthesizers (1), electric guitars (1), additional drum programming (1)
- Rhett Lawrence – Fairlight programming (2, 4, 7–9), Fairlight CMI (3), synthesizers (3), drum programming (3), synthesizer programming (7–9)
- Wayne Vaughn – sequencing (3)
- Bill Meyers – acoustic piano (4, 7), keyboards (5), synthesizer programming (5), drum programming (5)
- Larry Williams – additional programming (4, 7)
- Dan De Souza – keyboards (5), synthesizer programming (5), drum programming (5)
- Steve Lindsey – keyboards (6)
- Danny Sembello – synthesizer programming (6), drum programming (6)
- George Duke – acoustic piano (8, 9)
- Ian Prince – synthesizer programming (10), drum programming (10)
- Attala Zane Giles – additional guitars (2), drum programming (2), additional vocals (2)
- Ray Fuller – guitars (3)
- Paul Jackson Jr. – guitars (4, 7)
- Nathan East – bass (4, 7–9)
- Jeff Porcaro – drums (4, 7)
- Ricky Lawson – drum overdub (6), drums (8, 9)
- Marc Russo – horns (1)
- Wayne Wallace – horns (1)
- Gary Grant – horns (1, 6, 10)
- Jerry Hey – horns (1, 6, 10)
- Dan Higgins – horns (6, 10)
- Bill Reichenbach Jr. – horns (6, 10)
- Wanda Vaughn – backing vocals (3)
- Jeanette Williams – backing vocals (3)
- The Hawkins Family – backing vocals (8)
- Walter Hawkins, Edwin Hawkins and Lynette Hawkins Stephens – additional lead vocals (8)

Music arrangements

- Jerry Hey – horn arrangements (1, 6, 10)
- Attala Zane Giles – arrangements (2), synthesizer arrangements (2)
- Wayne Vaughn – arrangements (3)
- Maurice White – arrangements (3, 10)
- Bill Meyers – arrangements (4, 5, 7)
- Rev. Oliver Wells – arrangements (8), synthesizer arrangements (9)
- Philip Bailey – synthesizer arrangements (9)
- George Duke – rhythm arrangements (9)
- Ian Prince – arrangements (10)

Production

- Maurice White – producer (1–4, 6–10)
- Preston Glass – producer (1)
- Philip Bailey – co-producer (2, 9, 10)
- Attala Zane Giles – additional production (2)
- Wayne Vaughn – co-producer (3)
- Bill Meyers – producer (5)
- Acar Key – engineer (1)
- Tom Lord-Alge – engineer (1–4, 6–10), mixing (1–4, 6–10)
- Dave Rideau – engineer (2, 3, 6, 8–10), tracking engineer (4, 7), mixing (5)
- Paul Brown – engineer (5)
- Red Davidson – additional assistant engineer (1)
- Jeff Lorenzen – assistant engineer (1–4, 6–10)
- Jim "Watts" Vereecke – assistant engineer (1)
- Les Cooper – assistant engineer (2–4, 6–10)
- Mitch Zelezny – assistant engineer (2–4, 6–10)
- Liz Cluse – assistant engineer (4, 7)
- Jeffrey "Woody" Woodruff – assistant engineer (5)
- Mark Slagle – assistant engineer (8)
- Tony Lane – art direction
- Nancy Donald – art direction
- Max Aguilera Hellweg – photography

== Charts and certifications ==
=== Charts ===
==== Albums ====
Year	Chart	Peak position
1987	Billboard 200	33
1987	Billboard Top Soul Albums	3
1987	Blues & Soul Top British Soul Albums	16
1987	Dutch Album Top 100	17
1987	Sweden Albums (Sverigetopplistan)	20
1987	Japanese Albums (Oricon)	21
1987	Swiss Albums (Hit Parade)	25
1987	Finland (Suomen virallinen albumlista)	39
1987	German Albums (Offizielle)	42

==== Singles ====
Year	Single	Chart	Position
1987	"System of Survival"	Billboard Dance Club Songs	1
1987	"System of Survival"	Billboard Hot Dance Music/Maxi-Singles Sales	1
1987	"System of Survival"	Billboard Hot R&B Songs	1
1987	"System of Survival"	New Zealand RIANZ Top 40 Singles	9
1987	"System of Survival"	Dutch Single Top 100	14
1987	"System of Survival"	Blues & Soul Top British Soul Songs	17
1987	"System of Survival"	Belgian Singles Ultratop 50	25
1987	"System of Survival"	UK Pop Singles	52
1987	"System of Survival"	Billboard Hot 100	60
1987	"Evil Roy"	Billboard Dance Club Songs	38
1987	"Evil Roy"	Billboard Hot R&B Songs	22
1987	"Thinking of You"	Billboard Dance Club Songs	1
1987	"Thinking of You"	Billboard Hot Dance Music/Maxi-Singles Sales	1
1987	"Thinking of You"	Billboard Hot R&B Songs	3
1987	"Thinking of You"	Billboard Hot 100	67
1987	"You & I"	Billboard Hot R&B Songs	29

=== Certifications ===
Region	Certification	Certified units/sales
United States (RIAA)	Gold	500,000^{^}
^{^} Shipments figures based on certification alone.
