= Pablo Guzmán (reporter) =

American television journalist (1950–2023)

Paul Guzman (August 17, 1950 – November 26, 2023), better known as Pablo Guzmán, was an American television personality who worked as a reporter for WCBS-TV in New York City. He joined CBS 2 News in 1995 and was made a senior correspondent for the station. Before WCBS-TV, he was a reporter for Metromedia Channel 5 WNEW-TV (Now FOX 5 WNYW-TV) from 1984 to 1992 and at WNBC-TV from 1992 to 1995. He won two regional Emmy Awards.

== Life and career ==
Pablo Guzmán was born to Raul Guzmán and Sally Guzmán (née Palomino) in the South Bronx, New York, where they lived in the Melrose Housing Projects. He graduated from the Bronx High School of Science (class of 1968) and attended the State University of New York at Old Westbury. He was also one of the founders of the Young Lords party.

Guzmán worked as a journalist writing for publications such as the Village Voice, Essence, Rolling Stone, Musician, Downbeat, Billboard, and the New York Daily News before becoming a television news reporter. He was also featured in the 1992 film, Juice.

Guzmán was of Puerto Rican and Cuban descent. He married Debbie Guzmán (née Corley) in September 1990. Together they have two children: a daughter Angela, born in 1991, and a son Daniel, born in 1997.

In 2013, following severe blood clotting in his legs, Guzmán was diagnosed with normal pressure hydrocephalus.

Pablo Guzmán died in Westchester County, New York, on November 26, 2023, at the age of 73.
