= James T. Jones IV =

American music journalist and critic

James T. Jones IV (c. 1959/1960-March 13, 1996) was an American music journalist and critic who covered R&B, jazz, and hip hop music for USA Today.

== Biography ==
The nephew of Betty Carter, Jones was born in Detroit, Michigan. He received his master's degree from Western Michigan University, after which he went on to work for the Detroit News. In addition to his work in music journalism, he became a successful bass guitarist in his own right. He began working for USA Today in 1988. While working there, he interviewed such prominent musicians as Miles Davis, Anita Baker, Gladys Knight, and Stevie Wonder. He also did one of the last interviews that Eazy-E gave before the latter died of HIV/AIDS in 1995. In 1994, he received a Contributor award for journalism from the International Association of African-American Music. His article "Racism & Jazz" ran as the cover story in the March 1995 issue of the magazine Jazz Times.

=== Death and legacy ===
Jones died on March 13, 1996, at his home in Jersey City, New Jersey, at the age of thirty-six. At the time of his death, he was working as music/television editor for USA Today. USA Today itself reported that he had died of "an apparent heart attack". Vibe, to which Jones had also been a contributor, subsequently stated that he had died of "a heart attack and kidney failure". The James T. Jones IV Music Scholarship Fund was established in his memory at Howard University, and the International Association of African-American Music renamed one of its awards the James T. Jones IV Journalist Award in his honor.
