= Yamaha Entertainment Group =

Yamaha Entertainment Group of America
- Type: Division
- Industry: Music
- Founded: 2001; 25 years ago
- Founder: Chris Gero
- Headquarters: Franklin, Tennessee, U.S.
- Area served: United States
- Parent: Yamaha of America
- Website: hub.yamaha.com/artists/

Yamaha Entertainment Group of America is a division of the American subsidiary of Yamaha Corporation. It is based in Franklin, Tennessee and was created and developed in 2001 by Vice President Chris Gero. YEG is responsible for the development and advancement of Yamaha brand name through numerous artist-related activities worldwide, which includes endorsements, artist imaging, artist marketing, concert production, media operations, piano logistics, tour support, product placement, artist related publications, artist website development and strategic alliances.

== History ==
A 25-year veteran in the music industry, Chris Gero has spent the last 15 years spearheading Yamaha's artist branding. In 2001, he officially created and developed Yamaha Corporate Artist Affairs. In May 2007, YCAA became a company subsidiary of the Yamaha Corporation of America and became known as Yamaha Corporate Artist Affairs, Inc. Chris Gero, who was serving as the YCAA corporate director, assumed the position of vice president. More than 3,000 artists have been signed to contracts and the largest concerts in Yamaha's 110-year history have been produced under his direction. In 2009, YCAA became officially known as Yamaha Artist Services, Nashville. In 2011, Yamaha Artist Services, Nashville became a part of Yamaha Entertainment Group (YEG), and Chris Gero became the Vice President of YEG.

== Endorsements ==
The primary function of Yamaha Entertainment Group is the endorsement management of more than 3,000 artists and musicians around the globe. Yamaha Entertainment Group manages the Yamaha endorsement relationships of Paul McCartney, Elton John, Norah Jones, Alicia Keys, John Legend, Sheryl Crow, James Blunt, Justin Timberlake, Josh Groban, Sara Bareilles, Jamie Cullum, Chick Corea, Sarah McLachlan, and Gavin DeGraw, just to name a few.

== Product support and placement ==
Yamaha Entertainment Group also supports all levels of product support and product placement, including TV, film and stage placement. Not only is Yamaha the largest music manufacturer in the world, Yamaha is also one of the most recognized musical name brands in the world. YEG works to support the needs and requests of artists who earn a living using Yamaha products.

== Concert production ==
Another facet of Yamaha Entertainment Group is concert production, which showcases Yamaha artists and the products they use. YEG is a full-service concert production team composed of industry veterans that have put on everything from small clinic tours to elaborate arena shows. YEG has developed and produced the largest artist concerts in Yamaha's 110-year history.

In 2003, Yamaha produced "A Tribute to Elton John," a philanthropic effort which brought together some of today's most popular artists to pay tribute to Sir Elton John and raise money for music education. The event raised $330,000. More than 16,000 people attended the concert at the Arrowhead Pond in Anaheim, California. Some of the artists that lent their talents to this special night included Elton John, Ray Charles, Bruce Hornsby, Jewel, Norah Jones, Diana Krall, John Mayer, Michael McDonald, Randy Newman, Take 6 and many more.

In 2000, Los Angeles' historic Shrine Auditorium was the setting for YEG's (formerly YASN) Michael McDonald tribute concert, "Michael McDonald – A Gathering of Friends," which is available on DVD. Performers on this night included Michael McDonald, Patti LaBelle, Edwin McCain, James Ingram, Kenny Loggins, Christopher Cross and The Doobie Brothers.

Other artists who have participated in Yamaha produced concerts include: Stevie Wonder, Tony Bennett, Sarah McLachlan, John Legend, Brad Paisley, Jason Isbell, Sheryl Crow, Butch Walker, Larry Mullen Jr., Jamie Cullum, Josh Groban, Gavin DeGraw, Al Jarreau, Natalie Cole, k.d. lang, Donna Summer, Al Green, Alicia Keys, Peter Frampton, Delbert McClinton, Kirk Franklin, Vanessa Carlton, Chaka Khan, Keb Mo, Phil Vassar, Five for Fighting, Sara Bareilles, The Fray, and Earth, Wind & Fire.

== All Access ==
Yamaha Entertainment Group is responsible for the development and production of All Access magazine. The award-winning Yamaha artist branded magazine reaches over 300,000 readers biannually and provides a sneak peek into the lives of Yamaha artists.

In January 2009, YASN (now YEG) debuted behind-the-scenes videos of the artists during the photo shoots. A contest to win a guitar signed by the cover artist Jason Mraz was also launched.

== Film ==
Yamaha Entertainment Group also produces films, ranging from short opening videos for Yamaha concerts to featurettes showcasing Yamaha's elite line-up of artists and documentaries.

Yamaha Entertainment Group produced a full length concert film of Elton John's "The Million Dollar Piano", which was released through Cinema Live on March 18 and March 26, 2014 in 1,200 movie theaters throughout the world. YEG also produced and directed the 2014 DVD "Making The Million Dollar Piano," an hour-long documentary on the making of the custom-designed Yamaha piano featured in Elton John's Las Vegas show, "Million Dollar Piano." A short form of the DVD is part of a bundle package with John's album "The Diving Board," released by Best Buy. Yamaha Entertainment Group also produced a DVD release of the live show. The DVD was released July 1, 2014 and distributed by Eagle Rock Entertainment.

Yamaha Entertainment group created "Nathan East For The Record," a documentary about Nathan East, one of the most recorded bass players in the history of music. The 80-minute film showcases the recording Nathan East's phenomenal No.1 debut solo album, 30 years in the making. Eric Clapton, Quincy Jones, Phil Collins, Lionel Richie, Michael McDonald, Kenny Loggins, Vince Gill, David Foster and Don Was are among those featured.

On September 29, 2012, Yamaha Entertainment group filmed Sarah McLachlan's special encore performance for a Disklavier TV broadcast from her house in Canada. The performance footage was hosted on Disklavier TV so people who own Yamaha Disklavier pianos can have the piano reproduce her performance in their own homes.

In the Fall of 2014, Yamaha Entertainment Group was commissioned to produce a short film to represent the Yamaha brand, titled "The Gift." In early 2015, it premiered on Yamaha Corporation of America's Facebook page on Feb. 25, 2015. Now critically acclaimed, it has won nine awards, including:

Telly Awards 2015 Silver Award: "The Gift" for Online Video - Online Commercial - Use of Music/Jingle 2015 Silver Award: "The Gift" for Online Video - Branded Content & Entertainment - Promotional Branding 2015 Bronze Award: "The Gift" for Online Video - Online Video – Editing

Golden Award of Montreux 2015 Gold Award for "The Gift" for Music in Corporate Film

Summit Creative Awards 2015 Gold Award for "The Gift" for Corporate Image/Public Relations Video

Hermes Creative Awards 2015 Platinum Award for "The Gift" for Web Element - Video for the Web 2015 Platinum Award for "The Gift" for Video – Corporate Image 2015 Platinum Award for "The Gift" for Video – Public Relations 2015 Platinum Award for "The Gift" for Audio – Original Music

In 2017, Yamaha Entertainment Group and was nominated for five Emmy awards, and took home the award for Best Arts Spot (Caroline Campbell - Yamaha Electric Violin) as well as the award for Best Director/Short Form (Chris Gero, Caroline Campbell - Yamaha Electric Violin). Yamaha Entertainment Group was also nominated for Best Promo Spot and Music Composition & Arrangement for their short film The Company We Keep (directed and composed by Chris Gero), plus Best PSA Spot for Facing Addiction: It's Time.

== See also ==
- Yamaha Artist Services, Inc.
