= Philip Bailey discography =

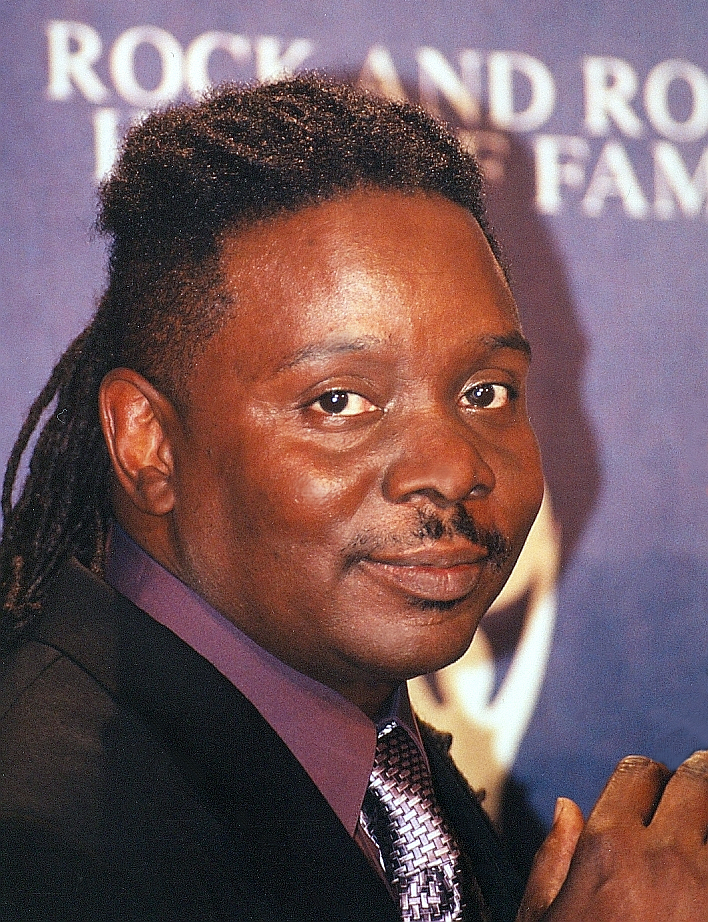
- Studio albums: 11
- Compilation albums: 1
- Singles: 10

This is the discography of the singer Philip Bailey, who has released 11 studio albums, one compilation album, and 10 singles.

== Albums ==
=== Studio albums ===
| Year | Album details | Peak chart positions | | | | | | | | | Certifications (sales thresholds) |
| Year | Album details | US | US R&B | US Jazz | US Con. Jazz | US Gos. | US Chr. | NLD | SWE | SWI | Certifications (sales thresholds) |
|---|---|---|---|---|---|---|---|---|---|---|---|
| Continuation | Released: 1983; Label: Columbia | 71 | 19 | — | — | — | — | 36 | 31 | — | |
| The Wonders of His Love | Released: 1984; Label: Myrrh | — | — | — | — | 17 | 13 | — | — | — | |
| Chinese Wall | Released: 1984; Label: Columbia | 22 | 10 | — | — | — | — | 12 | 45 | 22 | RIAA: Gold; MC: Gold |
| Triumph | Released: 1986; Label: Word | — | — | — | — | 33 | 18 | — | — | — | |
| Inside Out | Released: 1986; Label: Columbia | 84 | 30 | — | — | — | — | 74 | 30 | 29 | |
| Family Affair | Released: 1989; Label: Word | — | — | — | — | 37 | — | — | — | — | |
| Philip Bailey | Released: 1994; Label: Zoo Entertainment | — | 100 | — | — | — | — | — | — | — | |
| Life and Love | Released: 1998; Label: Eagle | — | — | — | — | — | — | — | — | — | |
| Dreams | Released: 1999; Label: Heads Up | — | — | 43 | — | — | — | — | — | — | |
| Soul on Jazz | Released: 2002; Label: Heads Up | — | — | 45 | — | — | — | — | — | — | |
| Love Will Find a Way | Released: 2019; Label: Verve | — | — | 1 | 1 | — | — | — | — | — | |

=== Compilations ===
| Title | Details |
|---|---|
| The Best of Philip Bailey: A Gospel Collection | Released: 1991; Label: Sony |

== Singles ==
| Title | Year | Peak chart positions | | | | | | | Certifications | Album |
| Title | Year | US | US R&B | US Adult R&B | US Jazz | BEL | NLD | UK | Certifications | Album |
|---|---|---|---|---|---|---|---|---|---|---|
| "I Know" | 1983 | — | 10 | — | — | — | — | — | | Continuation |
| "Trapped" | 1983 | — | 43 | — | — | — | — | — | | Continuation |
| "Photogenic Memory" / "Children of the Ghetto" | 1984 | — | 61 | — | — | — | — | — | | Chinese Wall |
| "Easy Lover" (with Phil Collins) | 1984 | 2 | 3 | — | — | 4 | 2 | 1 | RIAA: Gold; BPI: 2× Platinum; MC: Platinum | Chinese Wall |
| "Walking on the Chinese Wall" | 1985 | 46 | 56 | — | — | — | 25 | 34 | | Chinese Wall |
| "State of the Heart" | 1986 | — | 20 | — | — | — | — | — | | Inside Out |
| "Twins" (featuring Little Richard) | 1988 | — | — | — | — | 30 | 16 | 82 | | Twins soundtrack |
| "Here with Me" | 1994 | — | 66 | 33 | — | — | — | — | | Philip Bailey |
| "Fool for You" (Cee Lo Green featuring Melanie Fiona or Philip Bailey) | 2010 | — | 13 | 1 | — | — | — | — | | The Lady Killer |
| "Serpentine Fire" (Nathan East featuring Philip Bailey, Verdine White and Ralph Johnson) | 2017 | — | — | — | 17 | — | — | — | | Reverence |
"—" denotes a title that did not chart, or was not released in that territory.

== Other charted songs ==
| Title | Year | Peak chart positions | | | | Certifications | Album |
| Title | Year | US | AUS | CAN | NLD | Certifications | Album |
|---|---|---|---|---|---|---|---|
| "Stop Trying to Be God" (Travis Scott featuring Kid Cudi, James Blake, Philip Bailey, and Stevie Wonder) | 2018 | 27 | 87 | 19 | 94 | RIAA: Platinum; ARIA: Gold; MC: Platinum; BPI: Silver | Astroworld |
