= Walking on the Chinese Wall =

- Front cover of North American 7″ vinyl

Single by Philip Bailey

from the album Chinese Wall
- B-side: "Children of the Ghetto"
- Released: March 1985 (US)
- Recorded: 1984
- Studio: Townhouse Studios, London; Ocean Way Recording, Los Angeles; The Complex, Los Angeles
- Genre: Progressive rock; jazz fusion; progressive soul
- Length: 5:10
- Label: Columbia/CBS
- Songwriters: Roxanne Seeman; Billie Hughes
- Producer: Phil Collins

Philip Bailey singles chronology
"Easy Lover" (1984)	"Walking on the Chinese Wall" (1985)	"State of the Heart" (1986)

Alternative cover
- Front cover of UK 12″ vinyl

Music video
- "Walking On The Chinese Wall" on YouTube

"Walking on the Chinese Wall" is a song by American singer Philip Bailey released as the title track and third single from his 1984 studio album Chinese Wall produced by Phil Collins. The song features Collins on drums and background vocals and was later released by Collins on his 2018 Plays Well with Others box set. Written by Roxanne Seeman and Billie Hughes, it is an ode to the mystical and mercurial nature of life and love, inspired by Dream of the Red Chamber (Chinese: 紅樓夢; pinyin: Hónglóumèng), Chinese philosophy and the I Ching.

The recording sessions took place at The Townhouse recording studio in London, Ocean Way Recording and The Complex in Los Angeles, with George Massenburg engineering and mixing.

"Walking on the Chinese Wall" was released May 1985 by Columbia Records as the third single, peaking at number 46 on the Billboard Hot 100. The song received significant airplay internationally, charting in European territories, Australia and New Zealand.

A music video with Bailey in the Chinese countryside and a Chinese sage contemplating and throwing the I Ching coins, also went into heavy rotation.

Bailey received a Grammy nomination for Best R&B Vocal Performance, Male, for his performance on the Chinese Wall album, at the 28th Annual Grammy Awards, 1986.

Concurrent with the September 28, 2018 launch of Collins' Not Dead Yet Tour, Collins released Plays Well with Others, a box set featuring tracks recorded by artists he collaborated with, which includes "Walking on the Chinese Wall" as track 4 on disc 2.

In 1998, Sony Germany released a Bailey compilation album titled Walking on the Chinese Wall.

== Background ==
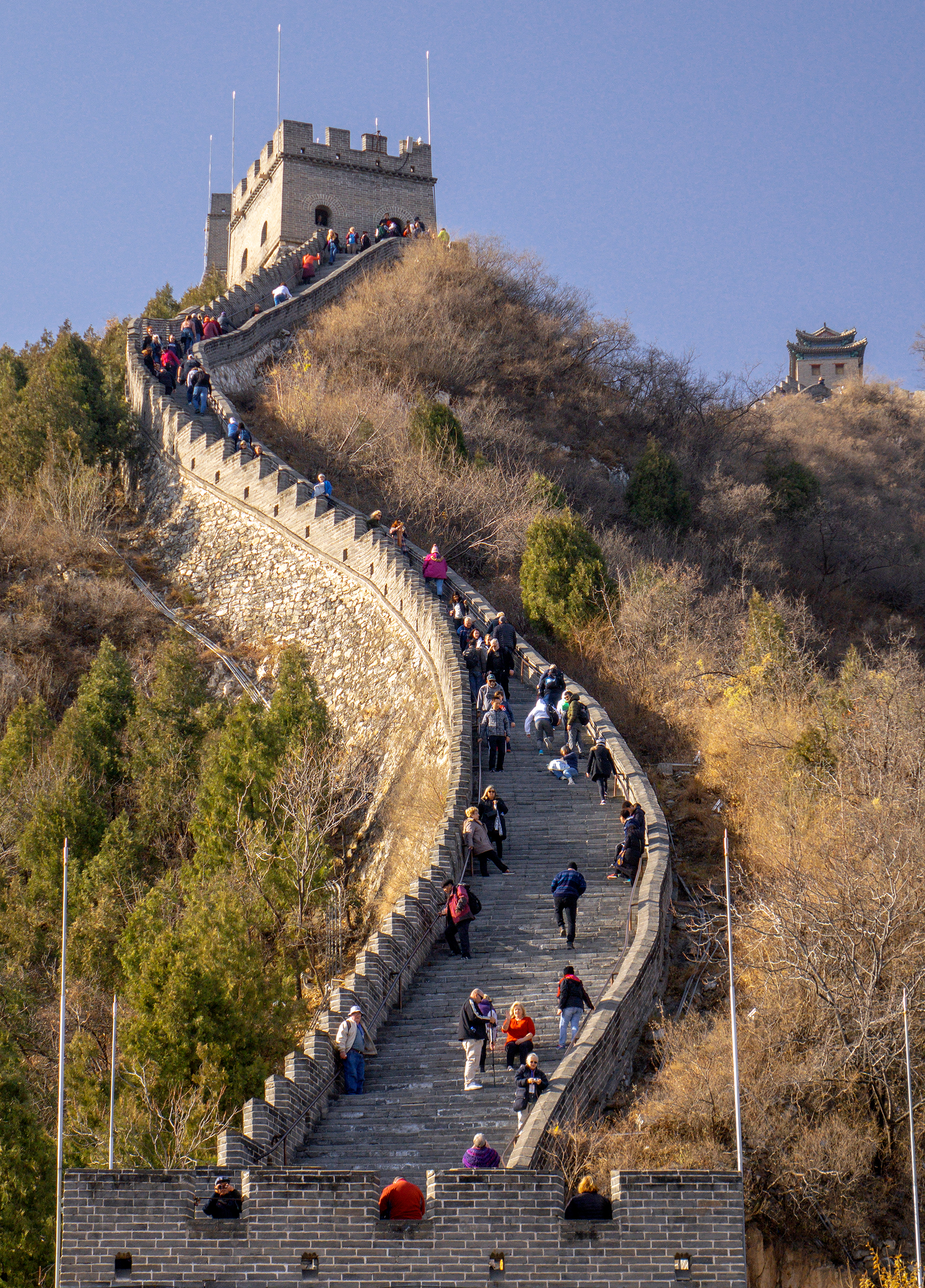
The Juyongguan Gate of The Great Wall of China

In 1982, after having studied Chinese arts and literature at Columbia University, Seeman went on a tour of China, where she walked on the Northern Juyongguan Gate of the Great Wall outside of Beijing. She returned to Los Angeles where she met Billie Hughes, a recording artist who had been writing songs for his own albums, and they began writing songs together. In 1983, Hughes went to Japan for four months, performing in a club in Osaka.

Upon Hughes' return, they began a partnership and bought recording equipment. The first song Hughes composed on the Oberheim OB-8 synthesizer and DMX drum machine was inspired with a feeling of the East. For the lyrics, Hughes asked Seeman to "write me something Chinese".

Seeman, who had written "Sailaway" with Philip Bailey for Earth, Wind & Fire's Faces album, called Bailey in Denver, Colorado, to tell him about the song before flying with Hughes to New York.

One year before, while in London with Earth, Wind & Fire on a European tour, Bailey had met Phil Collins and talked about the possibility of working together.

Bailey asked Seeman and Hughes to meet him with a chord chart at JFK airport, where he would be changing planes on his way to London to record with Collins at The Townhouse. At the airport, Hughes gave Bailey the chord chart, written out with a gold-ink pen, and Seeman gave Bailey a cassette of the song, along with the Sony Walkman it was in.

Asked about how the album got its name, Bailey explained:

I was about to fly from LA to London to record the album when I got a call from Roxanne Seeman in New York (...). She said she had a song she wanted me to hear. I had a stopover in New York, so Roxanne came out to the airport and played the song for me on her Walkman. The minute I heard it, I knew I wanted it (…). I guess this is one case where China got some good out of a Japanese invention.

— Philip Bailey

== Inspiration, composition and lyrical interpretation ==
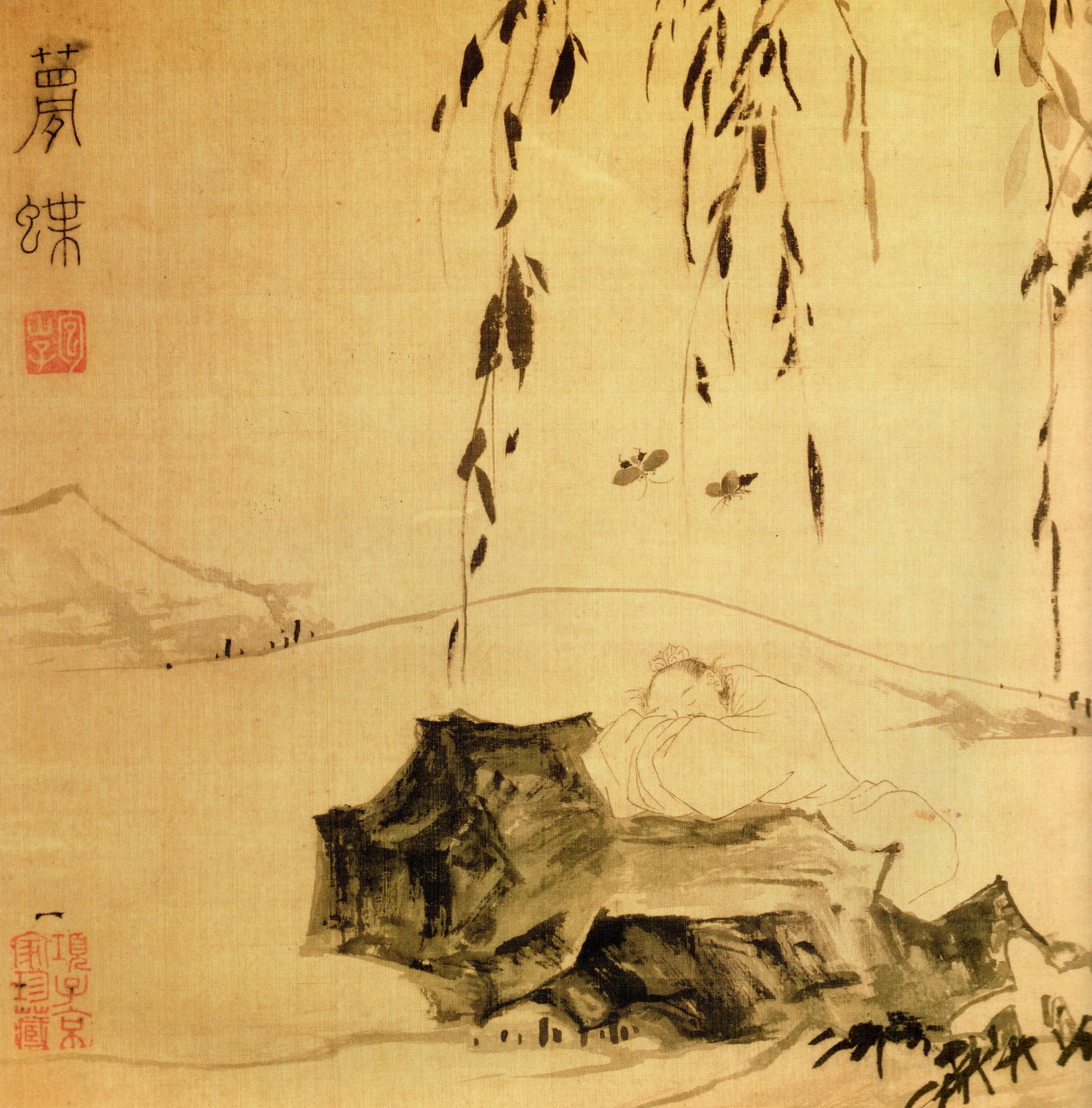
Zhuangzi dreaming of a butterfly

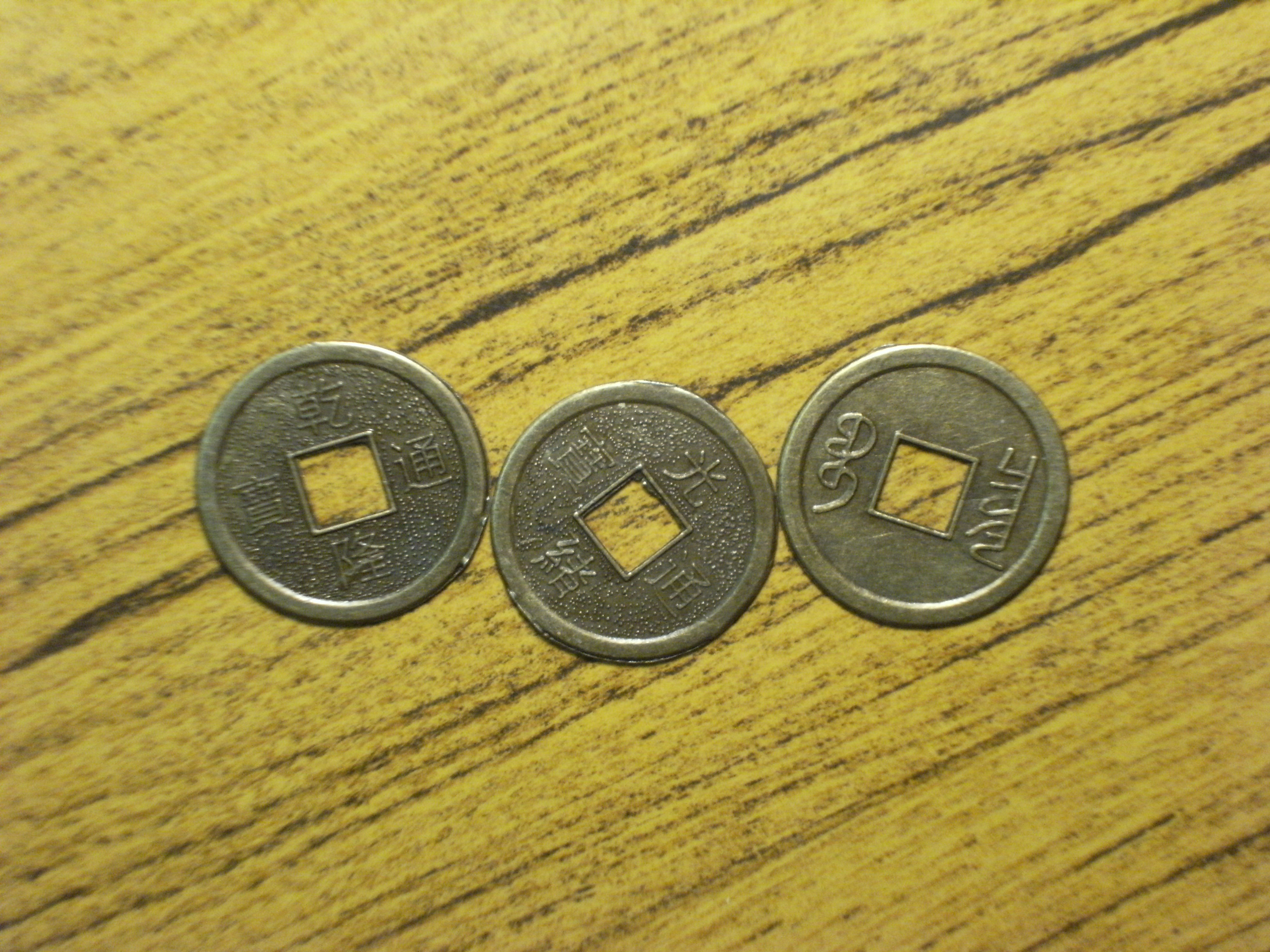
I Ching coins

"Walking on the Chinese Wall"
Sample from "Walking on the Chinese Wall"

In writing the lyrics, Seeman drew from her studies, making symbolic references to literature, art and philosophy in Chinese culture.

The song opens with Bailey singing "Butterfly spread your painted wings for an answer from the Ching" referencing Taoism and "The Butterfly Dream" passage from the Zhuangzi.

The following verse "By the stream, stretching on the rocks, tiger on the mountaintop" creates a yin and yang visual of mountains and water, and of the majestic tiger, symbolic of power, luck, and protection, leading the way into the chorus.

Seeman spent several months writing the lyrics. While reflecting on her China travels, she came up with the title and hookline "Walking on the Chinese Wall".

The second line of the chorus "watching for the coins to fall", references the tossing of I Ching coins, visualizing how randomly they will fall, as is the unpredictability of the future, to form the hexagrams in the I Ching ("Book of Changes"), read and interpreted for guidance in making decisions.

The lyrics "Red chamber dream, from the sky above, ancient tales of hidden Chinese love" are inspired by "Dream of The Red Chamber", one of China's Four Great Classical Novels. The lyrics touch on the Buddhist and Taoist philosophies of romantic love and the transitory nature of life thematic in the novel, also called "Story of The Stone”. The story follows a stone "From the sky above" in the Nonesuch Bluff begging a Taoist priest and Buddhist monk to bring it down to the Red Dust, to know life on earth. Granting the wish, a boy named Pao-yu is born with a jade stone in his mouth, beginning its earthly existence and the "ancient tales of Chinese love" inside the red chambers of the Jia family compound.

假作真時真亦假，

無為有處有還無。

Truth becomes fiction when the fiction's true; Real becomes not-real where the unreal's real.

— Dream of the Red Chamber

== Recording ==
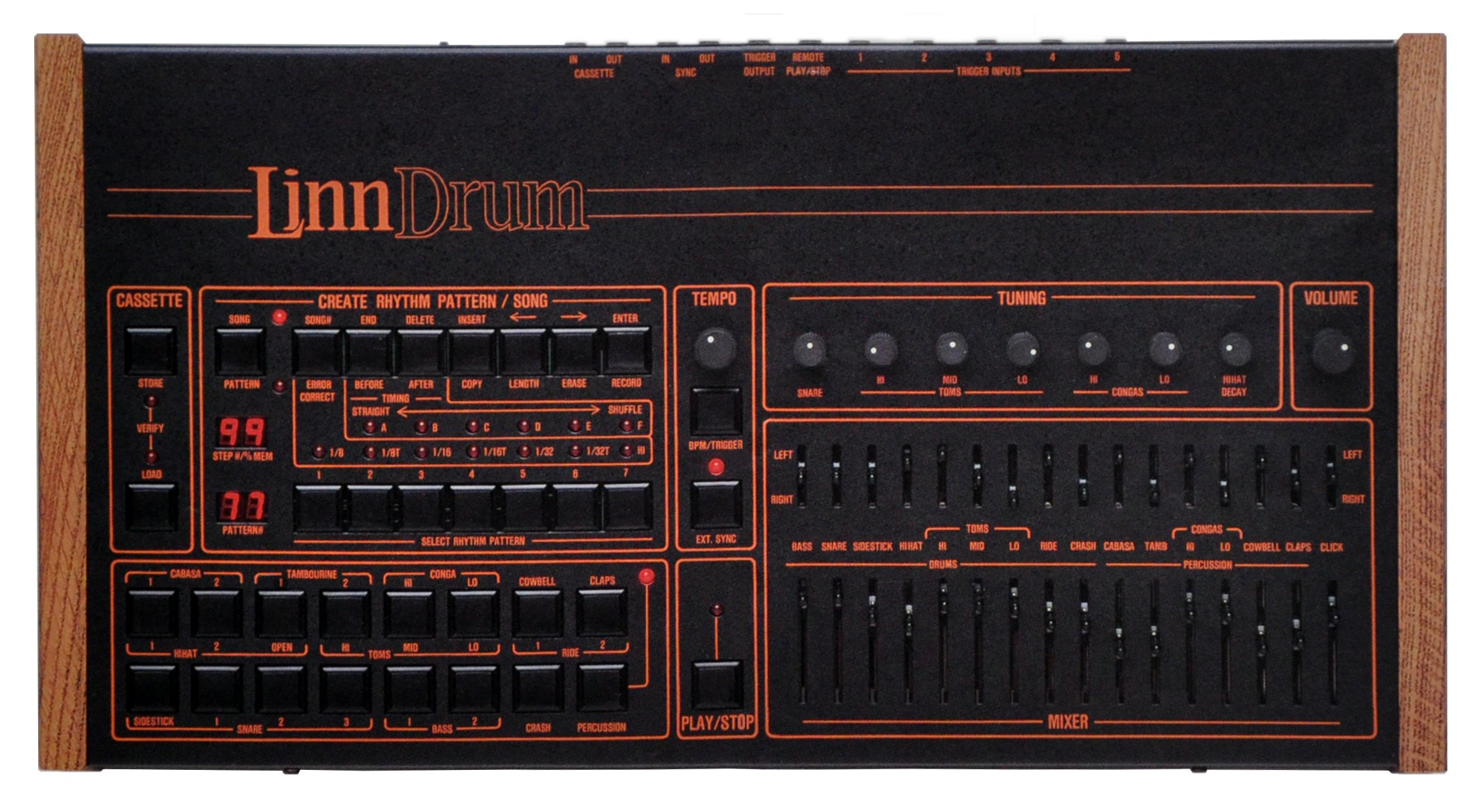
LinnDrum digital drum machine

Bailey arrived in London on May 8, staying at The Bramley Grange Hotel in Guildford for two months. Nathan East, bass, and Lessette Wilson, keyboards, also came from the US to record. Guitarist, Daryl Stuermer, played electric and acoustic. Phil Collins played drums, LinnDrum and keyboards.

The album "Chinese Wall" was recorded at the Townhouse Studios in London. The horns were recorded at Ocean Way Recording in Hollywood.

Bailey described his experience:

When two people are excited about working together that's when you get special moments in a studio. Music is very mystic and when you're surrounded by people who are equally in love with the art, unique moments happen. Moments that can only happen once and can never be done again even on stage. That's the kind of atmosphere I had with Phil.

— Philip Bailey

== Critical reception ==
The song received critical acclaim from music critics. Writing for The Voice, music journalist Nelson George praised the song in his album review: "The centerpiece is the title cut...inspired by a passage in Dream of the Red Chamber, an 18th century Chinese novel." He described the imagery of the lyrics as "exotic and graceful", quoting "Come down the clouds to the sea of flames/From the mountain hear the cry of pain". George commented on "the mesh of Daryl Stuermer's acoustic and electric guitars, Lessette Wilson's keyboards and the Phenix Horns" as being as "exotic and graceful" as the imagery of the lyrics, and of the vocal interpretation: "Bailey uses his heavenly falsetto in counterpart to his Maurice baritone for a mix of philosophical meditation and street-corner logic."

Cashbox magazine described the song as a "slow grooving track which has all the instrumental earmarks of Collins' deft hand. Big drum sound, punch horns and a breezy chorus melody all contribute to this gem…majestic vocals and arrangement". Billboard called it "an enigmatic, upper-register mood piece, in which the Collins-signature (and pop orientation) are almost as clear as on 'Easy Lover'". The Gavin Report features "Walking on the Chinese Wall" on Dave Sholin Personal Picks on March 15, 1985: "throw away the cookie cutter 'cause here's something totally new. Title song from Bailey's LP ... has a little bit of everything for everybody. ... Phil Collins' influence as producer comes through loud and clear".

Playboy praised the song, calling it "the best collaboration of the two Phils is on the album's title cut, which sounds - believe us - like Earth, Wind & Fire and Genesis all in one song." In The Washington Post, Joe Brown wrote: "Bailey's falsetto soars ethereally (and sometimes scrapes earthily) over Collins' glistening wall of exotic percussion and electronic textures" and called the song "otherworldly". Tom McCarthey of The Salt Lake Tribune wrote: "it is 'Walking On The Chinese Wall' that rises above the rest...horns, soulful vocals, rich instrumental textures and an Oriental feel that makes it a winner".

John Griffin of the Montreal Gazette praised the song for "Bailey's tremendous vocal talent". Paul Sexton of Record Mirror described the recordings as "very rock-rooted...with plenty of Collins hallmarks". William Ruhlmann of AllMusic said the tune "better represent(s) Bailey's ability to handle a variety of material from ballads to techno dance tracks with his elastic falsetto."

Lou Papineau of the Boston Globe described "Walking on the Chinese Wall" as "atmospheric". Volker Thormaehlen of NDR Hamburg predicted "Walking on the Chinese Wall" as a "sure hit" in April 1985. Music & Media included the video clip on its video hits list on May 13, 1985.

Eric Schafer of Press & Sun-Bulletin commended Bailey's wonderfully emotive delivery, writing "He can paint a breathtaking picture with it…the words float by in beautiful colors."

== Music video ==
The video for "Walking on the Chinese Wall" was directed by Duncan Gibbins. It was produced by Beth Broday and Steven Buck. Filming took place in the Santa Monica Mountains in an attempt to capture the "natural mystery and age-old beauty of the Chinese countryside."

Greg Burliuk of The Kingston Whig-Standard described the music video as “a visually beautiful and sensual rendition” Marianne Meyer for The Chilliwack Progress described “stylized clip features former Earth, Wind & Fire vocalist amid a dream-like collage of Oriental workers, the proverbial Chinese wiseman, falling I Ching pieces and martial arts-like dancers.” Lydia Kolb On Videos for The Paducah Sun wrote "very oriental…scenes of martial arts, I Ching, farming and Chinese extras dressed in their native attire make for a magical video…the music flows with the visual"

== Personnel ==
- Philip Bailey – lead and backing vocals
- Phil Collins – keyboards, drums, LinnDrum, backing vocals
- Lesette Wilson – keyboards
- Daryl Stuermer – guitars
- Nathan East – bass
- Josie James – backing vocals
- The Phenix Horns – horns
  - Don Myrick – saxophone
  - Louis Satterfield – trombone
  - Rahmlee Michael Davis – trumpet
  - Michael Harris – trumpet
- Tom Tom 84 – horn arrangement
- George Massenburg – engineer, mixing
- Phil Collins – producer
- Tony Lane and Nancy Donald – art direction and design
- Ellen Land-Weber and Randee St. Nicholas

== Chart performance ==
Chart performance for "Walking On The Chinese Wall"
Chart (1985)	Peak position
Australia (Kent Music Report)	26
Netherlands	25
Europe (Eurochart Hot 100)	32
European Airplay (Music & Media)	13
Germany	25
New Zealand	18
UK Singles Chart	34
US Billboard Hot 100	46
US Hot R&B/Hip-Hop Singles & Tracks	56

== Televised performances ==
- Black Gold Awards (1985)
- American Bandstand
- Solid Gold
- Rose d’Or, Montreux Rock festival

== Cover versions ==
September 25, 2004, Alicia Keys headlined the Wall of Hope concert on the Northern Gate Juyongguan section of the Great Wall of China, commemorating the 20th anniversary of the Great Wall of China's restoration project. Sylvia Tosun, Nellie McKay and Cyndi Lauper performed the song live as a trio. Bailey's recording of "Walking on the Chinese Wall" was the finale of the event.
