= Here with Me (Philip Bailey song) =

1994 song by Philip Bailey

Single by Philip Bailey

from the album Philip Bailey
- Released: 1994
- Genre: R&B, soul
- Label: Zoo
- Songwriter(s): B. Barnes, Brian McKnight
- Producer(s): Brian McKnight, Robert Brookins

Philip Bailey singles chronology
"Twins" (1989)	"Here with Me" (1994)	"Fool for You" (2010)

"Here with Me" is a song recorded by singer Philip Bailey and released as a single in 1994 by Zoo Entertainment. It was produced by Brian McKnight and Robert Brookins. The song peaked at No. 33 on the Billboard Adult R&B Airplay chart.

== Critical reception ==
Langston Wertz Jr. of Knight Ridder wrote "There's nothing show-stopping here, but nothing bad either. Brian McKnight wrote and produced four tracks, including the lead single Here With Me." Dan Kening of the Chicago Tribune said "Here with Me shows (Bailey's) four octave voice is still potent."

== Personnel ==
- Lead vocals – Philip Bailey
- Backing vocals – Brian McKnight, Philip Bailey
- Recording engineer (remix) – Donnell Sullivan
- Recording engineer – Christopher Wood, Paul Clinberg
- Produced, vocal arrangements and all instruments performed by Brian McKnight
- Additional production by, keyboards and drums (remix) – Robert Brookins
- Programmed by Brian McKnight, Mike McKnight
- Remix – Donnell Sullivan, Robert Brookins
