= Dazz Band =

American R&B and funk band

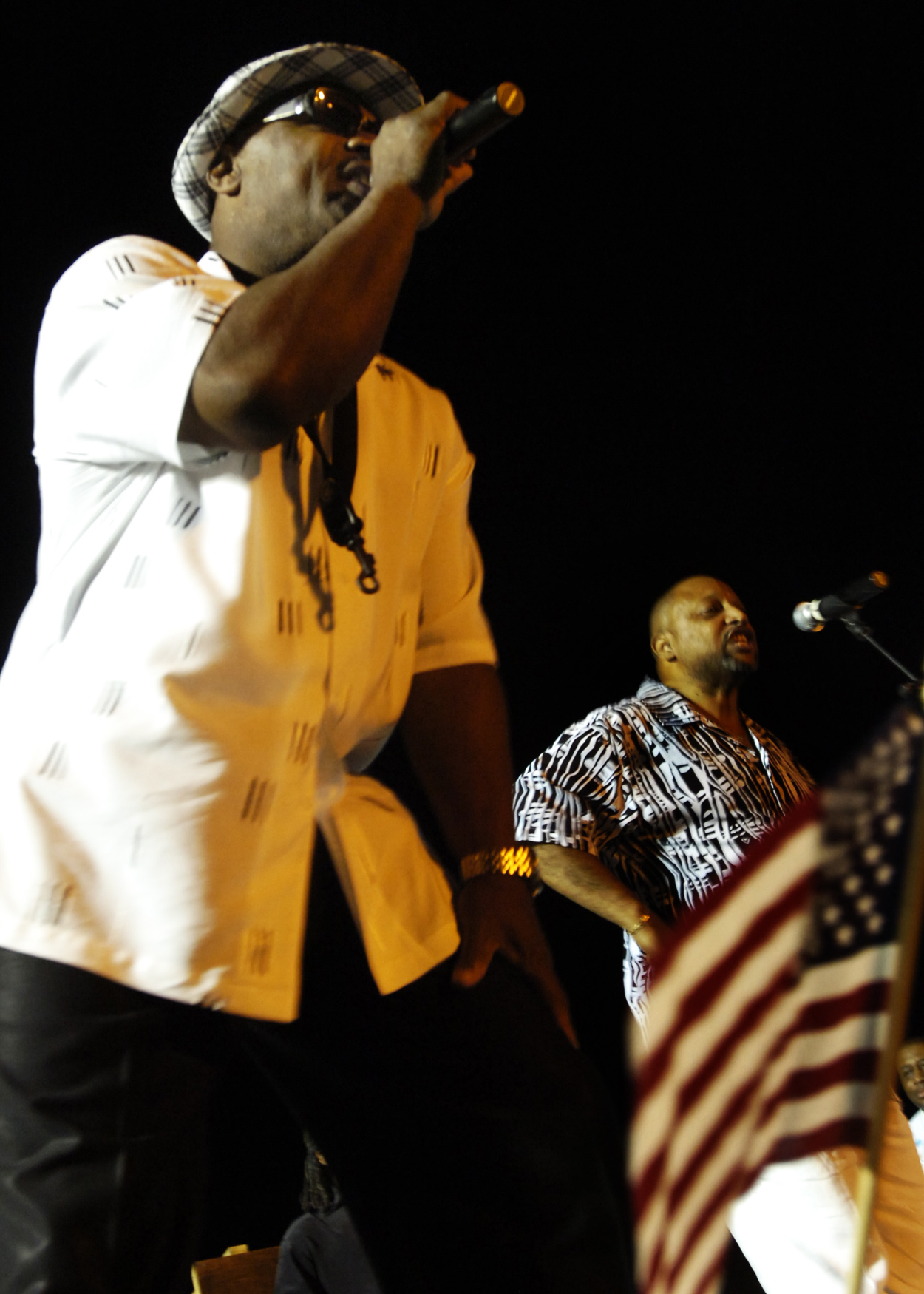
- Bobby Harris performing in 2008

Background information
- Also known as: Kinsman Dazz (1976–80)
- Origin: Cleveland, Ohio, U.S.
- Genres: Funk; soul; R&B
- Years active: 1976–present
- Labels: Motown; Geffen; Intersound
- Members: Bobby Harris; Marlon McClain; Raymond Calhoun; Keith Harrison; SNCR; Maurice Smith; Walter Barnes; Alvin Frazier
- Past members: Sennie "Skip" Martin; Donny Sykes; Les Thaler; Ed Meyers; Michael Wiley; Isaac Wiley Jr.; Michael Calhoun; Kevin Kendrick; Steve Cox; Eric Fearman; Pierre DeMudd; Juan Lively; Kenny Pettus; Jerry Bell; Terry Stanton; Nathaniel Philips; Michael G. Jackson

Dazz Band is an American R&B/funk band most popular in the early 1980s. Emerging from Cleveland, Ohio, the group's biggest songs include "Let It Whip" (1982), "Joystick" (1983), and "Let It All Blow" (1984). The name of the band is a portmanteau of the description "danceable jazz".

== History ==
Dazz Band formed in Cleveland, Ohio, in 1976, stemming from the jazz fusion band Bell Telefunk. Founded by Bobby Harris, Dazz Band has performed since 1976 and continues to perform today. Original Kinsman Dazz/ Dazz Band members included Bobby Harris (saxophonist, vocalist), Kenny Pettus (lead vocalist, percussions), Isaac "Ike" Wiley Jr. (drums), his brother Michael Wiley (bassist), and Michael Calhoun (songwriter/guitarist). The group was originally named Kinsman Dazz at the suggestion of Ray Calabrese, who later became its manager along with Sonny Jones, owner of The Kinsman Grill, located near the street Harris grew up on, and where the band worked as a house band.

Kinsman Dazz was signed to 20th Century Records in 1976, and the group expanded from the original quintet consisting of Harris, Calhoun, Pettus, and the Wiley brothers and added newcomers Ed Meyers (trombone), Wayne Preston (saxophonist), and Les Thaler (trumpet). In 1977, the group went to Los Angeles to record with producer Marvin Gaye. Due to illness, Gaye was unable to complete the project. Harris requested and got Philip Bailey, the vocalist of Earth, Wind & Fire, to produce the group's first album Kinsman Dazz. They released their first single, "I Might as Well Forget About Loving You" in 1978. Philip Bailey made significant contributions to the group's vocal arrangements and overall sound. He also co-produced the second album Dazz in 1979, when the band achieved their second charting hit, "Catchin' Up on Love".

In 1980, the Kinsman Dazz changed its name to Dazz Band, after being signed to Motown Records, which simultaneously included a re-organization of members. Wayne Preston and Les Thaler were no longer with the group, and Sennie "Skip" Martin, (trumpet, vocals), Pierre DeMudd (trumpet, vocals; April 20, 1953 – May 10, 2017), and Kevin Kendricks (keyboards) were added. In 1981, guitarist Eric Fearman was also added.

Dazz Band's first album for Motown was Invitation to Love (1980). The album's title track began a string of hits starting in March 1981. The group's next album Let the Music Play (1981) featured the single "Knock! Knock!" which reached the top 50. Dazz Band's breakthrough came with the hit "Let It Whip", written and produced by Reggie Andrews, from their Keep It Live (1982) album. "Let It Whip" reached No. 1 on the US Billboard R&B chart and won a Grammy Award for Best R&B Performance by a Duo or Group with Vocals. Members of the Grammy Award winning Dazz Band included: Sennie "Skip" Martin, Pierre DeMudd, Bobby Harris, Eric Fearman, Kenny Pettus, Steve Cox, Keith Harrison, Michael Wiley and Isaac Wiley.

On December 31, 1982, during Dazz Band's New Year's Eve concert at the Front Row Theatre in Cleveland, Mayor George V. Voinovich presented Bobby Harris and Dazz Band the Key to the city with proclamations from the State of Ohio. Dazz Band continued to score R&B hits with the songs such as "Party Right Here" (1983), "On the One for Fun" (1983) "Joystick" (1983), and "Let It All Blow" (also their biggest UK hit single, peaking at No. 12 in 1984).

Andrews produced five Dazz Band albums: Let the Music Play (1981), Keep It Live (1982), On the One (1983), Joystick (1983) and Jukebox (1984), all on the Motown label. Harris was the associate producer on all five albums, and producer of the album Hot Spot (1985), also on Motown. After winning the Grammy in 1982, Keith Harrison (1983) (vocalist, keyboards) was added to the group. In 1985, both Eric Fearman and Sennie "Skip" Martin (trumpet, vocalist) left the group and were replaced by guitarist Marlon McClain; and the search began for additional vocalists that would match the Dazz Band sound. In 1986, Dazz Band recorded Wild & Free (1986), which featured Jerry Bell as lead vocalist, and was released by Geffen Records.

Dazz Band signed with RCA Records in 1988 and released the album Rock the Room, which charted with the single "Anticipation" featuring vocals from Juan Lively. From 1994 until 2001, Terry Stanton (vocalist) contributed on its albums Funkology (1994) and Under the Streetlights (1995). After serving as lead vocalist with Kool & the Gang for many years, Sennie "Skip" Martin returned to performing and recording with Dazz Band in 1997, and recorded on Double Exposure (1997), recorded live in Seattle, Washington, and shared lead vocals with Terry Stanton on Time Traveler (2001) on Major Hits Records. In 2014, Harris added vocalist Donny Sykes to the band who performed consistently with the band for ten years. The band independently released "Drop It" in 2019, their first single in almost 20 years. Cleveland native, vocalist and multi-instrumentalist Alvin Frazier was added to the group in 2021. In 2024 Skip Martin retired from the Dazz Band, and new vocalists Maurice Smith and SNCR (pronounced sin-cere) were added. In 2026 they celebrates 50 Years of Dazz: The Legacy Lives LOUD with performances across the US.

=== 1990s revival ===
Following the infusion of rap into American music, many classic funk/R&B/soul acts in the US began performing abroad. In the late 1990s, Harris, along with the support of business entrepreneur Bo Boviard and long time friend and band member Marlon McClain, decided to revitalize funk in America and called upon members from the Bar-Kays, Con Funk Shun, Charlie Wilson of the Gap Band, the S.O.S. Band, and Dazz Band, for a project entitled 'United We Funk All-Stars'. A studio album followed that included Roger Troutman of Zapp. The concept was a success, and was captured on a live CD (Major Hits Records) promoted by syndicated radio host Tom Joyner.

== Trademark dispute ==
In November 2012, former Kinsman Dazz member Michael Calhoun applied for registration of the Kinsman Dazz Trademark along with Raymon W. Phillips. Michael Calhoun was released from the group in 1981. Two years later, in January 2014 Michael Calhoun again applied for trademark, this time going after the Dazz Band name along with former vocalist Jerry Bell, (Wild & Free) former trombone player Ed Meyers, Robert Young, and Larry Blake (both unknown to Harris). In March 2015, their mark was registered with the United States Patent and Trademark Office (USPTO). Upon learning of both registrations, Harris secured legal representation from former US Trademark Trial and Appeal Board Judge, Gary Krugman, at Sughrue Mion in Washington D.C. Petitions to cancel both fraudulent marks were filed with the United States Trademark Trial and Appeal Board. After two years of legal filings, and a series of unsuccessful attempts to stop Dazz Band performances the fraudulent Dazz Band mark was cancelled in April 2017 by the USTTAB, and then granted to its rightful owner Leader/ Founder Robert "Bobby" Harris. Petition to cancel the Kinsman Dazz mark held by Michael Calhoun and Raymon Philips was granted in August 2015, by the United States Trademark Trial and Appeal Board.

== Members ==
=== Current ===
- Bobby Harris – saxophone, clarinet, vocals (1976–present)
- Keith Harrison – keyboards, vocals (1982–1988; 2020–present)
- Marlon McClain – guitars (1984–2014; 2019–present)
- Raymond Calhoun – drums (1998–2001; 2019–present)
- SNCR (pronounced sin cere)- vocals (2025-present)
- Maurice Smith- vocals (2025-present)
- Walter Barnes- bass (2024-present)
- Alvin Frazier – background vocals (2021–present)

=== Past ===
- Sennie "Skip" Martin – trumpet, lead vocals (1980–1985; 1997–2024)
- Donny Sykes – lead vocals (2014–2024)
- Wayne Preston – saxophone (1976–1979)
- Les Thaler – trumpet (1976–1979)
- Michael G. Jackson – keyboards (1976–1979; died 1997)
- Ed Meyers – trombone (1976–1981)
- Michael Wiley – bass guitar, vocals (1976–1988; died 1993)
- Isaac Wiley Jr. – drums (1976–1985; died 2023)
- Michael Calhoun – guitars, vocals (1976–1981)
- Kenny Pettus – percussion, vocals (1976–1986; 1998–2001)
- Kevin Kendrick – keyboards (1980–1981; 1998–2001)
- Pierre DeMudd – trumpet, vocals (1980–1988; 1998–2001; died 2017)
- Eric Fearman – guitars (1980–1985)
- Steve Cox – synthesizer (1981–1988)
- Jerry Bell – lead vocals (1984–1999, 2011)
- Juan Lively – lead vocals (1988–1993)
- Terry Stanton – lead vocals (1994–2001; died 2006)
- Nathaniel Philips – bass (1995–1998)

== Discography ==
Dazz Band discography
- Studio albums: 15
- Singles: 20

=== Albums ===
| Year | Title | Peak chart positions | | Certifications | Record label |
| Year | Title | US | US R&B | Certifications | Record label |
|---|---|---|---|---|---|
| 1980 | Invitation to Love | — | 53 | | Motown |
| 1981 | Let the Music Play | 154 | 36 | | Motown |
| 1982 | Keep It Live | 14 | 1 | RIAA: Gold | Motown |
| 1982 | On the One | 59 | 12 | | Motown |
| 1983 | Joystick | 73 | 12 | | Motown |
| 1984 | Jukebox | 84 | 18 | | Motown |
| 1985 | Hot Spot | 114 | 24 | | Motown |
| 1986 | Wild & Free | 178 | 37 | | Geffen |
| 1988 | Rock the Room | — | 91 | | RCA |
| 1995 | Under the Streetlights | — | 42 | | Lucky |
| 1998 | Here We Go Again | — | 99 | | Intersound |
| 2001 | Time Traveler | — | — | | Major Hits Records |
"—" denotes releases that did not chart.

=== Singles ===
| Year | Title | Chart positions | | | | | Album |
| Year | Title | US | US R&B | US Dance | AUS | UK | Album |
|---|---|---|---|---|---|---|---|
| 1980 | "Shake It Up" | — | 65 | 75 | — | — | Invitation to Love |
| 1981 | "Invitation to Love" | 109 | 51 | — | — | — | Invitation to Love |
| 1981 | "Knock Knock" | — | 44 | — | — | — | Let the Music Play |
| 1982 | "Let It Whip" | 5 | 1 | 2 | 97 | — | Keep It Live |
| 1982 | "Keep It Live (On the K.I.L.)" | — | 20 | — | — | — | Keep It Live |
| 1983 | "On the One for Fun" | — | 9 | 52 | — | — | On the One |
| 1983 | "Cheek to Cheek" | — | 76 | — | — | — | On the One |
| 1983 | "Party Right Here" | — | 63 | — | — | — | On the One |
| 1983 | "Joystick" | 61 | 9 | — | — | — | Joystick |
| 1984 | "Swoop (I'm Yours)" | — | 12 | — | — | — | Joystick |
| 1984 | "Let It All Blow" | 84 | 9 | 3 | — | 12 | Jukebox |
| 1985 | "Heartbeat" | 110 | 12 | — | — | 79 | Jukebox |
| 1985 | "Hot Spot" | — | 21 | 33 | — | — | Hot Spot |
| 1986 | "L.O.V.E. M.I.A." | — | 48 | — | — | — | Wild & Free |
| 1986 | "Wild and Free" | — | 44 | — | — | — | Wild & Free |
| 1988 | "Anticipation" | — | 38 | — | — | — | Rock the Room |
| 1988 | "Single Girls" | — | 19 | 38 | — | — | Rock the Room |
| 1988 | "Open Sesame" | — | 83 | — | — | — | Rock the Room |
| 1998 | "Ain't Nuthin' but a Jam Y'all" | — | 58 | — | — | — | Time Traveler |
| 1998 | "Girl Got Body" | — | 81 | — | — | — | Here We Go Again |
"—" denotes releases that did not chart.

== Awards ==
- Grammy Award for Best R&B Performance by a Duo or Group with Vocal - 1982 - "Let It Whip".

== See also ==
- List of jazz fusion artists

== Bibliography ==
- Thompson, Dave (2001). Funk. Backbeat Books. pp. 243–245. ISBN 0-87930-629-7.
