= Sailaway =

Song by Earth, Wind & Fire

from the album Faces
- Published: 1980 by Sony/ATV Music Publishing, Saggifire Music, Sir & Trini Music, Criga Music, Noa Noa Music
- Released: October 14, 1980
- Recorded: March – July 1980
- Studio: George Massenburg Studio The Complex/ARC Studios, AIR Studios Montserrat
- Genre: R&B
- Length: 4:08
- Label: ARC/Columbia
- Songwriters: Maurice White; Eddie del Barrio; Philip Bailey; Roxanne Seeman
- Producer: Maurice White

"Sailaway" is a song written by Maurice White, Eddie del Barrio, Philip Bailey, and Roxanne Seeman and recorded by American R&B band Earth, Wind & Fire for their 1980 album Faces. It was produced by White and recorded during the Faces sessions in Montserrat at George Martin's AIR Studios and in Los Angeles at The Complex/ARC Studios 1980, engineered and mixed by George Massenburg.

"Sailaway" was released as a vinyl 12" maxi disc with "Back on the Road" in 1980 by Columbia Records.

Philip Bailey covered "Sailaway" under the title "Sail Away" on his jazz album Dreams issued in 1999 by Heads Up International.

== 1980 promo disc ==
=== Track listing ===
No.	Title	Writer(s)	Length
1.	"In Time"	Arlene Matza, Howard McCrary, Maurice White	3:44
2.	"Sailaway"	Philip Bailey, Eddie del Barrio, Roxanne Seeman, White	4:08
3.	"Back On the Road"	Al McKay, White	3:33
4.	"Win Or Lose"	Jean Hancock, Jerry Peters	3:55

== Composition and lyrics ==
This song is a waltz in ¾ time and recorded in the key of G Major.

For the Faces album, White and Bailey invited lyricists from outside of the band to collaborate with them "to polish our songs and take them to the next level." In the liner notes written by Christian John Wikane for the 2010 UK reissue of "Faces" released by Big Break Records, Wikane quoted Roxanne Seeman recounting:

“Philip called me one day and said, Do you want to write a song for The Fire?...I went over to his place. They had cut a beautiful rhythm track that Maurice had written with Eddie del Barrio. Philip gave it to me. We did some of it together. I went home, did some more of it, came back, and then we did more of it together.”

== Production ==
The rhythm track for Sailaway was recorded at George Martin's Air Montserrat studios. Vocals, horns, strings and overdubs were recorded at The Complex, designed by George Massenburg with custom-built equipment and board for Maurice White's ARC facility in Los Angeles.

Horns and strings were arranged by Eric Bulling. The recording includes a trombone solo performed by Louis Satterfield. The song was recorded and mixed by George Massenberg and Ken Fowler. It was mastered by Michael Reese.

== Critical reception ==
Phyl Garland of Stereo Review in her review of the album, praised the song saying "especially fine items among the fifteen selections on these four sides include 'Sailaway', a rhapsodically beautiful little tidbit". Sal Caputo of Gannett also described Sailaway as "reminiscent of the best of The Dells (and oddly enough The Beach Boys)".

== Philip Bailey solo version ==
Philip Bailey recorded a solo version of "Sailaway", entitled "Sail Away", on his jazz album Dreams, released in June 1999 on Heads Up International Records. The track was produced by Erik Huber.
