= Joystick (song) =

Single by Dazz Band

from the album Joystick
- Released: 1983
- Genre: R&B; funk; electro; disco
- Length: 5:20
- Label: Motown
- Songwriters: Eric Fearman; Bobby Harris
- Producer: Reggie Andrews

"Joystick" is a 1983 hit single by the Dazz Band, and was co-written by Bobby Harris, and Eric Fearman who were the singer and guitarist of the group. "Joystick" was the group's second biggest hit of three Top 100 singles, where it reached number 61 on the Billboard Hot 100 and number 9 on the Black Singles Chart.

== Background ==
The title of the song is double entendre for the male phallus (and is a common slang term used in the United Kingdom). The band adopted hip-hop production techniques, favoring keyboards and drum machines over horns, echoing the popularity of the electro-funk style. The single became a dancefloor favorite following its release.

== In popular culture ==
- The song can be heard in the Namco Museum 50th Anniversary compilation.
- It is included in the PlayStation 4, Xbox One, and Microsoft Windows versions of Grand Theft Auto V on the radio station Space 103.2.
- In Chile, the song was used of promo Chilean channel Telenorte in 1991.
