= Dazz (album) =

Studio album by Kinsman Dazz
- Released: 1979
- Studio: Filmways/Wally Heider Studios
- Genres: R&B, soul
- Label: 20th Century Records
- Producers: Pat Glasser, Tommy Vicari

Kinsman Dazz chronology
Kinsman Dazz (1978)	Dazz (1979)

Professional ratings
Review scores
Source	Rating
AllMusic	3/5 stars

Dazz is a 1979 album by R&B band Kinsman Dazz released on 20th Century Records. The album reached No. 62 on the Billboard Top R&B Albums chart.

== Overview ==
Artists such as Philip Bailey appeared upon the album.

The lead single, "Catchin' Up on Love" peaked at No. 33 on the Billboard Hot R&B Singles chart.

== Critical reception ==
Andrew Hamilton of AllMusic found "Producer Philip Bailey couldn't help tossing in some Earth, Wind & Fire vibes and grooves...Nine songs, three more than 20th Century tacked on their debut (album), makes this more fulfilling than the first, but not by much."

== Track listing ==
1. Dancin' Free (Ed Myers, Michael Calhoun) 7:00
2. I Searched Around (Calhoun) 4:39
3. Love Design (Isaac Wiley, Robert Harris, Wayne Preston) 6:14
4. Keep On Rockin' (Michael Jackson, Calhoun) 6:41
5. Catchin' Up on Love (Harris) 5:09
6. Can't Get Enough (Beloyd Taylor, Calhoun) 7:14

== Personnel ==
=== Dazz ===
- Kenny Pettus: Vocals
- Michael Calhoun: Lead Guitar
- Reggie Stewart: Acoustic and Rhythm Guitars
- Michael Wiley: Bass
- Isaac Wiley: Drums, Backing Vocals

=== Horns ===
- Bobby Harris: Tenor and Soprano Sax
- Wayne Preston: Backing Vocals, Alto Sax
- Les Thaler: Trumpet
- Ed Myers: Trombone

=== Additional Personnel ===
  - Listed as "Friends"
- Richard Baker: Keyboards and Synthesizers
- Joachime Young: Piano
- Paulinho Da Costa: Percussion
