= Philip Bailey (album) =

Studio album by Philip Bailey
- Released: March 29, 1994
- Recorded: June 1992–December 1993
- Studio: Aire L.A. Studios and Backroom Studios (Glendale, California); Friends Only Studio (Northridge, California); The Lighthouse (North Hollywood, California); Hollywild Studios (Hollywood, California); Tisway Recording Studios (Paradise Valley, Arizona); Soundtrack Studios (New York City, New York)
- Genre: Pop
- Length: 54:59
- Label: Zoo Entertainment
- Producer: Philip Bailey; Chuckii Booker; Robert Brookins; Brian McKnight; P.M. Dawn; Waymon Tisdale; Roxanne Seeman

Philip Bailey chronology
| The Best of Philip Bailey: A Gospel Collection (1991) | Philip Bailey (1994) | Life and Love (1995) |

Philip Bailey is the seventh studio album by American R&B and soul singer Philip Bailey, issued in March 1994 by Zoo Entertainment.

== Overview ==
Artists such as Brian McKnight, Chuckii Booker, PM Dawn and Robert Brookings and Wayman Tisdale appeared on the album.

=== Singles ===
A tune titled, "Here with Me", peaked at No. 33 on the Billboard Adult R&B Airplay chart.

== Critical reception ==
Professional ratings
Review scores
| Source | Rating |
|---|---|
| AllMusic | 2.5/5 stars |
| Indianapolis Star | 3/4 stars |
| Dayton Daily News | 3/4 stars |
| Newsday | (favourable) |
| Toledo Blade | (favourable) |
| Orange County Register | (favourable) |
| Knight Ridder | (favourable) |
| Rolling Stone | (favourable) |

Carol Cooper of Newsday praised the album saying, "Philip Bailey marks the return to form of one of the most distinctive voices in R & B. Thanks to a shrewd selection of producer/songwriters, Bailey sounds neither freeze-dried in '70s atavisms or like some aging "new jack" wannabe. Dawn, Robert Brookins and Brian McKnight each creates a divergent yet appropriate context for Bailey's powerful upper range. And Chuckii Booker's stylistic debt to the Minneapolis sound serves notice of how much Prince once borrowed from the Emotions and Earth, Wind & Fire." David Montero of the Orange County Register said, "Bailey has crafted an album that will appeal to his old fans from his days with Maurice White and company, and he may attract some new ones with songs that stand above much of what is played on urban contemporary radio. The cover is misleading because he looks like a young, up-and-coming hip-hop homeboy a la the members of Another Bad Creation. But Bailey has some solid tracks that are catchy and well-produced." Montero added "In a sense this is a theme album, as every track deals with romance — hardly a new topic in pop. But Bailey manages to avoid the cliches and has made an album that is as enjoyable to listen to as some of his early stuff from his Earth, Wind and Fire days." Lynn Dean Ford of the Indianapolis Star in a 3/4 stars review, noted, "He's back again with a self-titled album that may not spawn as big a hit as his 1984 'Easy Lover' duet with Phil Collins, but it's good nonetheless. You'll find some very engaging pop-soul here, much of it produced by singer-songwriters Chuckii Booker and Brian McKnight. Bailey's falsetto doesn't soar as it once did on EW&F standards like 'Reasons' and 'Write a Song For You,' but his vocals seem more expressive when he isn't pushing to reach those stratospheric notes. And he can still weave some soul into a song, particularly on 'Love Me Tonight' and 'Just Like Summer.'"

Michael Eric Dyson of Rolling Stone stated, "In the hands of a lesser talent, some of these songs might barely seep through the cracks, less than memorable fare conjured up to please a legend. But Bailey's grace and magic, apparent throughout, redeem the recordings." Dyson added "What's remarkable above all on this album is that Bailey's brilliant falsetto retains its sweet purity, even as he employs more of a pleasing baritone than he has revealed before. While that alone doesn't compensate for some of the just-OK stuff he has to work with, it delights nonetheless." With a 3 out of 4 stars rating, Derek Ali of the Dayton Daily News wrote, "There's "something" for just about every musical taste among the 12-tracks, while a unity in sound is maintained throughout the album." Ali added, "If you listen closely, there are hints of every step of Bailey's musicial [sic] life on the album. The music is pure."

== Track listing ==
| No. | Title | Writer(s) | Length |
|---|---|---|---|
| 1. | "Stay Right Here" | Philip Bailey, Chuckii Booker | 5:07 |
| 2. | "Just Like Summer" | Philip Bailey, Robert Brookins | 5:10 |
| 3. | "Here with Me" | Brian McKnight | 4:22 |
| 4. | "A Diamond Just Like You" | Philip Bailey, Attrell Cordes | 4:53 |
| 5. | "I'm Ready" | Brian McKnight | 4:43 |
| 6. | "Love Me Tonight" | Philip Bailey, Robert Brookins, Wayman Tisdale | 4:58 |
| 7. | "I Won't Open My Arm" | Philip Bailey, Attrell Cordes | 3:48 |
| 8. | "Crazy Things You Do for Love" | Brian McKnight | 4:23 |
| 9. | "Live It Up" | Philip Bailey | 4:47 |
| 10. | "Yours" | Philip Bailey, Roxanne Seeman, Chuck Wild | 4:02 |
| 11. | "Call Me" | Brian McKnight | 4:30 |
| 12. | "Something's Missing" | Philip Bailey | 4:16 |

Japan release

A duet between Philip Bailey and Dee Dee Bridgewater, called People And Places", was a bonus track on the album's Japanese release. This tune which also featured upon 1994 French film La Vengeance d'une Blonde's soundtrack.

== Personnel ==
- Philip Bailey – lead vocals, backing vocals (1–3, 8–12), vocal arrangements (1, 9, 12)
- Chuckii Booker – all instruments (1, 9, 12), vocal arrangements (1, 9, 12), backing vocals (9)
- Robert Brookins – keyboards (2, 3, 5, 6, 8, 11), drums (3, 5, 6, 8, 11), arrangements (6)
- Brian McKnight – all instruments (3, 5, 8, 11), programming (3, 8, 11), backing vocals (3, 8, 11), vocal arrangements (3, 8, 11)
- Michael McKnight – programming (3, 8, 11)
- Oji Pierce – keyboards (4, 7)
- Rex Rideout – keyboards (4, 7)
- Michael Fossenkemper – programming (4, 7)
- Chuck Wild – keyboards (10)
- Frank Gambale – guitar solo (2)
- Cameron Grieder – guitars (4)
- Jerry Barnes – bass (4)
- Wayman Tisdale – bass (6), arrangements (6)
- Etienne Lytel – bass (7)
- John Paris – drums (2)
- Demetric Collins – drum programming (10)
- Jeff Haynes – percussion (4)
- Diane Lesser – English horn (4)
- Scott Mayo – saxophone solo (5)
- David Boruff – alto saxophone (10)
- Bill Meyers – string arrangements (2)
- Max Ellen – horn and string arrangements (4), concertmaster (4)
- Joseph Gianono – orchestration (4)
- Eddie del Barrio – string arrangements (10)
- Valerie Davis – backing vocals (1, 12)
- Sheldon Reynolds – backing vocals (1, 12)
- Alex Brown – backing vocals (2)
- Karen Bernod – backing vocals (4, 7)
- Robbie Jenkins – backing vocals (4, 7), BGV co-arrangements (7)
- Prince Be – BGV arrangements (7)
- Nadirah Ali – lead and backing vocals (10)

Strings (Tracks 2, 4 & 10)

- Eugene Moye and Fred Zlotkin – cello
- Alfred Brown and Mitsue Takayama – viola
- Abe Appleman, Charles Libove, Gene Orloff, John Pintavalle, Matthew Raimondi, Elliot Rosoff, Richard Sortomme, Marti Sweet and Marilyn Wright – violin

=== Production ===
- James Mack – executive producer
- Bill Preskill – executive producer
- James Hunter – A&R
- Chuckii Booker – producer (1, 9, 12)
- Robert Brookins – producer (2, 6), additional producer (3, 5, 8, 11)
- John Paris – co-producer (2)
- Brian McKnight – producer (3, 5, 8, 11)
- P.M. Dawn – producers (4, 7)
- Wayman Tisdale – producer (6)
- Philip Bailey – producer (10)
- Roxanne Seeman – producer (10)
- Valicia Franklin – project coordinator
- K. Lee Hammond – art direction
- Nancy Ogami – design
- Michael Halsband – photography
- Cathy Arquilla – stylist
- Bennett Freed for One Love Management – management

Technical credits

- Guy DeFazio – engineer (1, 9, 12), assistant engineer (1, 9, 12)
- Anthony Jeffries – engineer (1, 9, 12), assistant engineer (1, 9, 12)
- Greg Burbidge – mixing (1, 9)
- Donnell Sullivan – engineer (2, 3, 6), mixing (2, 6, 10), remix engineer (3, 5, 8, 11)
- Paul Klingberg – engineer (3, 5, 8, 11)
- Chris Wood – engineer (3, 5, 8, 11)
- Robert Brookins – remix engineer (3, 5, 8, 11), engineer (6)
- Michael Fossenkemper – engineer (4, 7), mixing (4, 7)
- Troy Halderson – horn and string engineer (4)
- Chuck Wild – recording (10)
- Susan Becker – assistant engineer (1, 9, 12), mix assistant (1, 9, 11)
- Ray Silva – assistant engineer (1, 9, 12)
- Dominic Barbera – assistant engineer (4, 7)
- Scott Canto – assistant engineer (4, 7)
- Robert Friedrich – assistant horn and string engineer (4)

== Charts ==
| Chart (1994) | Peak position |
|---|---|
| US Top R&B Albums (Billboard) | 100 |
