= Chinese Wall (album) =

Studio album by Philip Bailey
- Released: October 18, 1984
- Recorded: Townhouse Studios, London, England; The Complex, Los Angeles, California; Ocean Way Recording, Los Angeles, California
- Genres: Pop; soul; rock
- Length: 50:17
- Label: Columbia
- Producer: Phil Collins

Philip Bailey chronology
The Wonders of His Love (1984)	Chinese Wall (1984)	Triumph (1986)

Singles from Chinese Wall
- 1. "Photogenic Memory" / "Children of the Ghetto" Released: October 1984; 2. "Easy Lover" Released: November 1984; 3. "Walking on the Chinese Wall" Released: March 1985

Chinese Wall is the third solo studio album by American singer Philip Bailey, released on the Columbia Records label in October 1984. The album reached number 22 on the Billboard 200 and number 10 on the Billboard Top R&B/Hip-Hop Albums charts respectively. The album was Grammy nominated in the category of Best R&B Vocal Performance, Male. Chinese Wall has also been certified gold in the US by the RIAA.

== Background ==
The album was produced by English musician Phil Collins, who also played drums, keyboards, co-wrote and sang co-lead vocals. Collins recalled first meeting Bailey during his The Hello, I Must Be Going Tour in late 1982 through The Phenix Horns (formerly the EWF horns); as per Collins, Bailey liked how the former presented himself as a drummer & singer and thought he would be a good match for a future project. They crossed paths again in Los Angeles in Summer 1983, whilst Phil was touring with Robert Plant for The Principle of Moments; it was then that they discussed working on Bailey's next album, which Collins agreed to do in London.

He started work on the album after completing work on Eric Clapton's album Behind the Sun in Spring 1984. The recording took two months to complete. However, Collins recalled a difficult start to the project whilst rehearsing; he felt that Bailey was confiding more in bassist Nathan Watts than him as the producer, and they were trying to make an R&B record at first which Collins was not comfortable with. He considered stepping down as producer, but was eventually persuaded to continue, with Bailey agreeing to do an album of what they did best as opposed to a pure R&B record.

Collins later said, "Bailey got a lot of flak for being produced by someone who is white. There was this paranoia that the album would not be played by black stations...The reason I was on the video for "Easy Lover" is that I knew it wouldn't be shown if it was just Phil Bailey."

== Singles ==
The album's smash pop hit was "Easy Lover", a duet with Phil Collins. The song also got a Grammy nomination for Best Pop Performance by a Duo or Group With Vocals.

The album's second single was "Photogenic Memory", released in 1984. Released in March 1985, the third and final single "Walking on the Chinese Wall" reached number 46 on the Billboard Hot 100.

== Critical reception ==
Professional ratings
Review scores
Source	Rating
AllMusic	4/5 stars
Christgau's Record Guide	B+
Rolling Stone	3/5 stars

Joe Brown of The Washington Post commented, "The spirit of Earth, Wind and Fire goes one step beyond on his second solo effort, guided masterfully by Phil Collins, who can't seem to make a misstep these days. Bailey's falsetto soars ethereally (and sometimes scrapes earthily) over Collins' glistening wall of exotic percussion and electronic textures". With a 3 out of 5 stars rating, James Henke of Rolling Stone stated, "This is not as funky as Earth, Wind and Fire, but it's a hundred times more appealing."

Writing for The Voice, music journalist Nelson George praised Chinese Wall, declaring it "the most solid album by a black male since Purple Rain". He described "the Phenix Horns' stratospheric horn chart...Collins drumming (this white boy is funky) and Arif Mardin's impeccable string charts", saying Bailey "singing breathier and deeper – projects his sensitivity in a more muscular baritone."

Gary Graff of the Detroit Free Press wrote "Earth, Wind & Fire singer Bailey makes a wise bet by enlisting Collins to produce and play on his album. Besides a strong duet, "Easy Lover," the performances lift the album's quality above some inconsistent songwriting." Lou Papineau of The Boston Globe found that, "This is a likable, undemanding album of lively uptempo struts and warm ballads."

== Track listing ==
Chinese Wall – Standard edition
No.	Title	Writer(s)	Length
1.	"Photogenic Memory"	Jerry Knight, Davitt Sigerson, Lillie Mae Clarke	5:26
2.	"I Go Crazy"	Philip Bailey, Glen Ballard, Marti Sharron	4:48
3.	"Walking on the Chinese Wall"	Billie Hughes, Roxanne Seeman	5:08
4.	"For Every Heart That's Been Broken"	Ballard, Clif Magness	4:15
5.	"Go"	Nathan East, Ralph Johnson	4:30
6.	"Easy Lover" (with Phil Collins)	Bailey, Phil Collins, East	5:05
7.	"Show You the Way to Love"	Bailey, Ballard, Sharron	4:41
8.	"Time Is a Woman"	Barry Blue, Julian Littman, Robin Smith	4:31
9.	"Woman"	Steve Mitchell, Sharron, Gary Skardina	5:04
10.	"Children of the Ghetto"	Chris Amoo, Eddie Amoo	6:49
Total length:			50:16

Chinese Wall – 2011 remastered edition (bonus tracks)
No.	Title	Length
11.	"Easy Lover" (Extended Dance Remix)	6:19
Total length:		56:35

== Personnel ==
- Philip Bailey – lead vocals, backing vocals, percussion (10)
- Lesette Wilson – keyboards, acoustic piano solo (10)
- George Massenburg – synthesizer programming
- Godfrey Wang – synthesizer programming
- Daryl Stuermer – guitars, guitar solo (4, 6)
- Nathan East – bass guitar, bass pedals (4), kalimba (4), keyboards (5)
- Phil Collins – drums (1–9), vocoder (1), LinnDrum (1, 3, 5), Simmons (2, 8, 9), keyboards (3, 6), backing vocals (3, 6, 8), lead vocals (6), percussion (10)
- Paulinho da Costa – percussion (7, 10)
- The Phenix Horns – horns (3, 5, 7–9)
  - Don Myrick – saxophones (3, 5, 7–9), sax solo (5)
  - Louis Satterfield – trombone (3, 5, 7–9)
  - Michael Harris – trumpet (3, 5, 7–9), trumpet solo (9)
  - Rahmlee Michael Davis – trumpet (3, 5, 7–9)
  - Tom-Tom 84 – horn arrangements (3, 5, 7–9)
- Arif Mardin – string arrangements (5, 7, 9)
- Josie James – backing vocals (3, 4, 8)
- Carl Carwell – backing vocals (7, 10)
- Winston Ford – backing vocals (7, 10)
- Nigel Martinez – backing vocals (8)

== Production ==
- Phil Collins – producer
- George Massenburg – engineer
- Steve Chase – assistant engineer
- Judy Clapp – assistant engineer (percussion, horns, strings)
- Murray Dvorkin – assistant engineer (percussion, horns, strings)
- Tom Perry – assistant engineer (percussion, horns, strings)
- Tony Lane – art direction
- Nancy Donald – art direction
- Ellen Land-Weber – back cover photography
- Randee St. Nicholas – front cover photography
- Cavallo, Ruffalo and Fargnoli Management – management

== Charts and certifications ==
=== Weekly charts ===
Chart (1985)	Peak position
Australian Albums (Kent Music Report)	13
Dutch Albums (Album Top 100)	12
German Albums (Offizielle Top 100)	39
New Zealand Albums (RMNZ)	30
Swedish Albums (Sverigetopplistan)	45
Swiss Albums (Schweizer Hitparade)	22
UK Albums (Official Charts)	29
US Billboard 200	22
US Top R&B/Hip-Hop Albums (Billboard)	10

=== Year-end charts ===
Chart (1985)	Position
Dutch Albums (Album Top 100)	60
US Billboard 200	63
US Top R&B/Hip-Hop Albums (Billboard)	44

=== Certifications ===
Region	Certification	Certified units/sales
United States (RIAA)	Gold	500,000^{^}
Canada (Music Canada)	Gold	50,000^{^}
^{^} Shipments figures based on certification alone.

=== Singles ===
Year	Single	Chart	Position
1984	"Photogenic Memory"	Hot R&B/Hip-Hop Songs (Billboard)	61
1984	"Easy Lover"	The Billboard Hot 100	2
1984	"Easy Lover"	Hot R&B/Hip-Hop Songs (Billboard)	3
1984	"Easy Lover"	Mainstream Rock Songs (Billboard)	5
1985	"Easy Lover"	Adult Contemporary (Billboard)	15
1985	"Easy Lover"	Dance Club Songs (Billboard)	7
1985	"Easy Lover"	Hot Dance Music/Maxi-Singles Sales (Billboard)	3
1985	"Easy Lover"	UK Singles (Official Charts Company)	1
1985	"Walking on the Chinese Wall"	Hot R&B/Hip-Hop Songs (Billboard)	56
1985	"Walking on the Chinese Wall"	The Billboard Hot 100	46
