= The Best of Philip Bailey: A Gospel Collection =

Greatest hits album by Philip Bailey
- Released: March 12, 1991
- Genre: Gospel
- Length: 60:32
- Label: Word
- Producer: Philip Bailey, Rev. Oliver W. Wells

Philip Bailey chronology
Family Affair (1989)	The Best of Philip Bailey: A Gospel Collection (1991)	Philip Bailey (1994)

The Best of Philip Bailey: A Gospel Collection is a gospel compilation album by Philip Bailey which was released in 1991 by Word Records.

== Critical reception ==
Professional ratings
Review scores
Source	Rating
Allmusic	4.5/5 stars
Chicago Tribune	3/4 stars

Lynn Van Matre of the Chicago Tribune gave a 3 out of 4 stars rating saying "The emphasis here is on lavishly produced, uptempo contemporary gospel songs with an unabashedly slick, pop feel-you could even dance to a lot of them. Bailey's silky, seductive falsetto is as appealing as ever, and the mood is joyfully uplifting throughout." With a 4 out of 5 stars rating William Rhulmann of Allmusic wrote "Bailey brings the same creamy pop production and warm falsetto singing to his inspirational work that he does to his solo albums and to Earth, Wind & Fire, although he is far gentler here (except when he's being religiously righteous on "Call To War")."

== Track listing ==
No.	Title	Writer(s)	Length
1.	"The Wonders of His Love"	Philip Bailey, Eduardo del Barrio, Teri DeSario Purse	5:45
2.	"He Don't Lie"	Skip Scarborough	4:58
3.	"The Love of God"	Rev. Oliver W. Wells	3:13
4.	"All Soldiers"	Keithen Carter, Patrick Leonard	4:48
5.	"Lonely Broken Hearted People"	Philip Bailey, Richard Smallwood, Rev. Oliver W. Wells	4:09
6.	"Marvelous"	Philip Bailey, George Duke	4:24
7.	"Come Before His Presence"	Ingram, Margaurite	4:31
8.	"I Am Gold"	Philip Bailey, Terry McFaddin, Jerry Peters	5:05
9.	"I Will No Wise Cast You Out"	Philip Bailey, Tony Haynes, Skip Scarborough	4:40
10.	"No Compromise"	Philip Bailey, Rev. Oliver W. Wells	3:40
11.	"Call to War"	Philip Bailey, Richard Smallwood, Rev. Oliver W. Wells	5:14
12.	"The Other Side"	Keithen Carter, Patrick Leonard	4:39
13.	"Thank You (Extended Remix)"	Bobby Nunn	5:26

== Credits ==
- Philip Bailey – Producer
- Steve Hall – Remastering
- Rev. Oliver W. Wells – Producer
