= Love Will Find a Way (Philip Bailey album) =

Studio album by Philip Bailey
- Released: November 2019
- Recorded: June 2018 – August 2019
- Studio: Brooklyn Recording (Brooklyn, New York); Record Plant (Los Angeles, California); Mungo Bungo Studio (Rancho Cucamongo, California); Harvey Mason Media (North Hollywood, California)
- Genre: Jazz
- Length: 55:43
- Label: Verve
- Producer: Philip Bailey; Robert Glasper; Chick Corea; Christian McBride; will.i.am; Herman Jackson

Philip Bailey chronology
| Soul on Jazz (2002) | Love Will Find a Way (2019) |

Love Will Find a Way is a jazz album by Philip Bailey released in November 2019 on Verve Records. The album reached No. 1 on both the Billboard Top Jazz Albums chart and the Billboard Contemporary Jazz Albums chart.

== Overview ==
Love Will Find a Way was produced by Philip Bailey. Artists such as Bilal, Chick Corea, Kamasi Washington, will.i.am and Robert Glasper also featured on the album.

== Critical reception ==
Professional ratings
Review scores
| Source | Rating |
|---|---|
| AllMusic | 4/5 stars |
| Financial Times | 4/5 stars |
| Jazz Journal | 4/5 stars |
| Jazz Times | (favourable) |
| Record Collector | 4/5 stars |
| The Times | 4/5 stars |

With a four out of five stars rating Mike Hobart of the Financial Times wrote "The 12th solo album from Earth Wind and Fire's lead singer underscores his octave-spanning falsetto with generation-crossing, jazz-heavy support. The A-list collaborators include Chick Corea, Kamasi Washington and Christian Scott aTunde Adjuah alongside drummers Steve Gadd and Kendrick Scott. With pianist Robert Glasper heavily involved in production, the jazz influence goes deeper than the instrumental breaks which embellish most tracks." Andrew Gilbert of Jazz Times exclaimed "Bailey sounds energized by the contributions of 21st-century jazz players steeped in the EWF catalog like bassist Derrick Hodge, drummer Kendrick Scott, and keyboardist Robert Glasper." Gilbert added "Amid a resurgence of the spiritual jazz sound, Bailey offers a welcome reminder that the L.A.-based EWF played a vital role in its creation." Daryl Easlea of Record Collector who gave a four out of five star rating wrote, "Earth Wind & Fire mainstay Philip Bailey’s first solo album in 17 years is a remarkable dive into contemporary jazz." Simon Adams of Jazz Journal also opined "this set is a youthful return to form."

Music critic Ann Powers of NPR placed Love Will Find a Way at No. 5 on her list of the Top Ten Albums of 2019. Phil Freeman of Stereogum also gave Love Will Find a Way an honourable mention in his list of the Ten Best Jazz Albums of 2019.

== Track listing ==
| No. | Title | Writer(s) | Length |
|---|---|---|---|
| 1. | "Billy Jack" | Curtis Mayfield | 6:57 |
| 2. | "You're Everything" | Chick Corea; Neville Potter | 4:50 |
| 3. | "We're a Winner" (featuring Bilal) | Mayfield | 5:32 |
| 4. | "Stairway to the Stars" | Christian McBride; Christian Scott; Philip Bailey; Will.i.am | 4:56 |
| 5. | "Brooklyn Blues" | Philip Bailey; Robert Glasper | 2:56 |
| 6. | "Once in a Lifetime" | Brian Eno; Chris Frantz; David Byrne; Jerry Harrison; Tina Weymouth | 5:53 |
| 7. | "Just to Keep You Satisfied" | Anna Gaye; Elgie Stover; Marvin Gaye | 5:17 |
| 8. | "Sacred Sounds" | Philip Bailey; Philip D. Bailey; Glasper | 8:16 |
| 9. | "Long as You're Living" | Julian Priester; Oscar Brown Jr.; Tommy Turrentine | 4:40 |
| 10. | "Love Will Find a Way" (featuring Casey Benjamin) | Bedria Sanders | 6:31 |

== Personnel ==
- Philip Bailey –vocals, backing vocals, percussion, arrangements
- Kenny Barron – acoustic piano
- Chick Corea – keyboards
- Robert Glasper – keyboards, arrangements
- Casey Benjamin – vocoder (10), saxophone (10)
- Adam Hawley – guitars
- Lionel Loueke – guitars
- Adam Rogers – guitars
- Mike Severson – guitars
- Alex Al – bass
- Carlos del Puerto – bass
- Derrick Hodge – bass
- Christian McBride – bass, backing vocals, arrangements
- Teddy Campbell – drums
- Steve Gadd – drums
- will.I.am – drums, arrangements
- Jerome Jennings – drums
- Kendrick Scott – drums
- Manolo Badrena – percussion
- Luisito Quintera – percussion
- Kevin Richard – percussion
- Steve Wilson – flute, saxophone
- Miguel Gandelman – tenor saxophone
- Kamasi Washington – saxophone
- Garrett Smith – trombone
- Ray Monteiro – trumpet
- Christian Scott – trumpet
- Alisha Bauer – cello
- Ginger Murphy – cello
- Daphne Chen – violin
- Lisa Dondlinger – violin, concertmaster
- Herman Jackson – arrangements
- Valerie Bailey – backing vocals
- Bridgette Bryant – backing vocals
- Joey Diggs – backing vocals
- Bilal – lead and backing vocals (3)

== Production ==
- Philip Bailey – executive producer, producer, liner notes
- Trinity Bailey – executive producer
- Robert Glasper – producer (1, 3, 5, 8)
- Chick Corea – producer (2)
- Christian McBride – producer (4, 9)
- will.I.am – producer (4)
- Herman Jackson – producer (6, 7, 10)
- Harvey Mason, Jr. – vocal producer
- Russell Elevado – recording, mixing
- Bernie Kirsh – recording
- Keith Lewis – recording
- Brian Montgomery – recording
- David Rideau – recording
- Alex DeTurk – mastering at The Bunker (Brooklyn, New York)
- Rafaela Hernández – production manager
- Ferni Onafowokan – A&R administration
- Natalie Weber – A&R manager
- Philip Doran Bailey – project consultant
- Josh Cheuse – creative director
- Tishaun Dawson – A&R direction, design
- Jabari Jacobs – photography
