= Family Affair (Philip Bailey album) =

Studio album by Philip Bailey
- Released: 1989
- Studio: Hollywood Sound Recorders and Ignited, (Hollywood, California); Le Gonks West (West Hollywood, California); Wildcat, Studio 55, and Valley Center (Los Angeles, California); Mastersound, Soundscape, Southern Living, and Huff Recording (Atlanta, Georgia)
- Genre: Gospel
- Length: 39:29
- Label: Word
- Producer: Philip Bailey; Oliver Wells

Philip Bailey chronology
Inside Out (1986)	Family Affair (1989)	The Best of Philip Bailey: A Gospel Collection (1991)

Family Affair is an album by American musician Philip Bailey, released through Word Records in 1989.

== Critical reception ==
Professional ratings
Review scores
Source	Rating
AllMusic	2/5 stars
Calgary Herald	B

The Calgary Herald noted that "most of the music here would not be out of place on the pop charts."

== Track listing ==
No.	Title	Writer(s)	Length
1.	"This Is How the Work Gets Done"	Charlie Peacock	4:09
2.	"Family Affair"	Philip Bailey, Pamela Phillips-Oland, Monty Seward	4:45
3.	"No Compromise"	Bailey, Rev. Oliver W. Wells	3:40
4.	"Lonely Broken Hearted People"	Philip Bailey, Richard Smallwood, Rev. Oliver W. Wells	4:10
5.	"Oasis"	Bailey, Wells	1:07
6.	"Where Can I Go?"	Bailey, Wells	4:39
7.	"Let's Talk About Jesus"	Bailey, Smallwood, Wells	3:12
8.	"Love That Lasts"	Wells	3:46
9.	"Call to War"	Bailey, Smallwood, Wells	5:20
10.	"Lord You Reign"	Bailey, Smallwood, Wells	4:41

== Personnel ==
Musicians

- Philip Bailey – lead vocals, drum programming (7, 9)
- Oliver Wells – keyboards, synthesizer programming
- Morgan Winters – Synclavier programming, additional synthesizer programming (5)
- Monty Seward – keyboards (2), synthesizer programming (2), additional rhythm track arrangements (2)
- Billy Savage – synthesizer programming (4, 9)
- Bruce Allen – Hammond B3 organ (7)
- Richard Smallwood – acoustic piano (7, 10), additional rhythm track arrangements (7)
- Steve Deutsch – additional synthesizer programming (8)
- Ricky Keller – additional synthesizer programming (8)
- Pat Buchanan – guitars (1)
- Sheldon Reynolds – guitars (2, 7)
- A. Ray Fuller – guitars (3, 4, 6, 8, 9)
- Andrew Gouche – bass (7)
- Scott Meeder – drums (1), drum programming (1)
- David Huff – drum programming (3, 4, 6–9)
- Kirk Whalum – tenor sax solo (5), soprano sax solo (9)

Orchestra on "Lord You Reign

- Oliver Wells – orchestra arrangements and conductor
- Sandy Arenz – oboe
- Brice Andrus – French horn
- Thomas Witte – French horn
- Jere Flint – cello
- Nancy Maddox – cello
- Ruth Ann Little – violin
- Oscar Pereira – violin
- Willard Shull – violin
- Marie Yadzinski – violin
- Jack Bell – percussion, timpani

Background vocalists

- John Askew – backing vocals (1)
- Robin Brown – backing vocals (1)
- William Croom – backing vocals (1)
- Taj Harmon – backing vocals (1)
- Joseph N. Johnson – backing vocals (1)
- Carl Caldwell – backing vocals (2–4, 6, 8, 9)
- Renée Crutcher – backing vocals (2–4, 6)
- Jean Johnson – backing vocals (2–4, 6)
- Rick Nelson – backing vocals (2–4, 6)
- Alfie Silas – backing vocals (2–4, 6)
- Philip Bailey – backing vocals (3, 4, 6, 10)
- The Williams Brothers – backing vocals (7)
- Melvin Williams – additional BGV arrangements (7)
- Daryl Coley – vocal conductor (8, 9), additional BGV arrangements (8), choir conductor (10), backing vocals (10)
- Lucretia Berkins – backing vocals (8–10)
- Robert Craig – backing vocals (8–10)
- Mittie Dawson-Allen – backing vocals (8–10)
- Gina Dowell – backing vocals (8–10)
- Andrea Hurst – backing vocals (8, 9)
- Ed Marshall – backing vocals (8, 9)
- Beverly Nelson-Brown – backing vocals (8–10)
- Shannon Sterling – backing vocals (8–10)
- Tina Sterling – backing vocals (8–10)
- Keila Stewart – backing vocals (8–10)
- Eddie Williams – backing vocals (8, 9)
- Leon Patillo – backing vocals (9)
- Oliver Wells – backing vocals (9)
- Gwendolyn Culp – backing vocals (10)

Production

- Dan Posthuma – executive producer
- Philip Bailey – producer, arrangements
- Oliver Wells – producer, arrangements
- Dan Garcia – mixing (1, 5, 7, 10)
- Dean Burt – mixing (2–4, 6, 8, 9), engineer
- Jeff Balding – engineer
- Ron Christopher – engineer
- Tony D'Amico – engineer
- Maureen Droney – engineer
- David Huff – engineer
- Ricky Keller – engineer
- Paul Klingberg – engineer
- Al Phillips – engineer
- Chris Rich – engineer
- Martin Schmelzle – engineer
- Josh Schneider – engineer
- Jim Zumpano – engineer
- David Bates – second engineer
- Scott Carter – second engineer
- Reid Hall – second engineer
- Doug Sax – mastering at The Mastering Lab (Hollywood, California)
- Laurie Fink – art direction
- Nellie Prestwood – design
- Randee St. Nicholas – photography
- Louis Wells – stylist
- Terence Finnigan – make-up
- Cassandra Rachel – hair

== Charts ==
Chart (1989)	Peak position
US Top Gospel Albums (Billboard)	37
