= Dreams (Philip Bailey album) =

Studio album by Philip Bailey
- Released: June 22, 1999
- Recorded: November 1998–March 1999
- Genre: Jazz
- Length: 47:20
- Label: Heads Up International
- Producers: Philip Bailey; Robert Brookins; Erik Huber; Morris Pleasure

Philip Bailey chronology
Life and Love (1995)	Dreams (1999)	Soul on Jazz (2002)

Professional ratings
Review scores
Source	Rating
AllMusic	3/5 stars
All About Jazz	(favourable)
Philadelphia Daily News	(favourable)
Chicago Sun-Times	3/5 stars

Dreams is a studio album by American singer Philip Bailey released on Heads Up International Records in June 1999. The album peaked at No. 43 on the Billboard Top Jazz Albums chart.

== Overview ==
Dreams features guest appearances by artists such as Grover Washington Jr., George Duke, Kirk Whalum, Gerald Veasley, Marcus Miller, and Gerald Albright. On the album, Bailey covered Pat Metheny's "Something to Remind You", Bread's "Make It with You" and Earth, Wind & Fire's "Sailaway" which was featured on the band's 1980 album Faces.

== Critical reception ==
Paula Edelstein of All About Jazz found "Philip sings with the spiritual essence from on high and with the finesse and soul of the Song Master that he is. This CD is worth the wait". Johnthan Widran of Allmusic claimed "Legendary falsetto-voiced Earth, Wind & Fire vocalist Philip Bailey invites quite a guest list of smooth jazz stars to this party, which marks a strong adult contemporary turn from his solo gospel recordings... A little more groove next time might be cool, but Bailey's still got enough of the old fire burning."

Regina Robinson of the Chicago Sun-Times declared "Philip Bailey has the kind of voice that can move gracefully from the funky Earth, Wind & Fire sound, which he has been a part of for nearly three decades, to the jazzy vocals that are his first love. And so he does, quite well, on his latest solo effort, "Dreams." Al Hunter Jr. of the Philadelphia Daily News wrote ""Dreams" is an excellent showcase for Bailey" adding "Bailey serves up a jazz-flavored disc that is as impressive as his four-octave singing range."

== Track listing ==
No.	Title	Writer(s)	Length
1.	"Waiting for the Rain"	Erik Huber	4:15
2.	"Moondance"	Van Morrison	5:00
3.	"Dream Like I Do"	Erik Huber	4:50
4.	"Something"	Erik Huber	3:34
5.	"Make It with You"	David Gates	4:15
6.	"Sail Away"	Philip Bailey, Eddie del Barrio, Roxanne Seeman, Maurice White	3:45
7.	"The Masquerade Is Over"	Herbert Magidson, Allie Wrubel	5:35
8.	"Are We Doing Better Now"	Philip Bailey, Sir Bailey, Robert Brookins	4:55
9.	"Something to Remind You"	Lyle Mays, Pat Metheny	5:45
10.	"Strength to Love You"	Philip Bailey, Sir Bailey, Robert Brookins	5:26

== Personnel ==
Musicians

- Philip Bailey – vocals
- Erik Huber – keyboards (2, 3, 5, 6), programming (2, 3, 5, 6), additional keyboards (4)
- Joe McBride – acoustic piano (2)
- Steve Scalfati – keyboards (4), programming (4), guitars (4)
- Morris Pleasure – keyboards (7, 9), programming (7, 9), acoustic piano (10)
- Robert Brookins – keyboards (8, 10), programming (8, 10)
- George Duke – acoustic piano (8), synth solo (8)
- Peter White – acoustic guitar (1, 2)
- Pat Metheny – guitars (9)
- Gerald Veasley – bass (2)
- Marc Miller – bass (5)
- Douglas Barnett – acoustic bass (7, 9)
- Mark Ivester – drums (7, 9)
- Luis Conte – percussion (2)
- Everette Harp – soprano saxophone (1)
- Kirk Whalum – saxophone (3)
- Grover Washington, Jr. – saxophone (5)
- Gerald Albright – saxophone (7)
- Donald Hayes – saxophone (10)
- Randy Brecker – flugelhorn (2)
- Darnel Alexander – backing vocals (1–6)
- Valerie Davis – backing vocals (9)

Production

- Dave Love – executive producer
- Erik Huber – producer (1–6), engineer
- Steve Scalfati – associate producer (4)
- Philip Bailey – producer (7, 8, 10), vocal producer
- Morris Pleasure – producer (7, 9)
- Robert Brookins – producer (8, 10), vocal producer, engineer
- Gerald Albright – engineer
- Rick Braun – engineer
- Wayne Holmes – engineer
- Denny Jiosa – engineer
- Mark Knox – engineer
- Scott Noll – engineer
- Joe Primeau – engineer
- Reed Ruddy – engineer
- Martin Walters – engineer
- Peter White – engineer
- Erik Zobler – engineer
- Bob Belden – overdub supervisor
- Louis F. Hemsey – mastering at GKS Mastering (Hollywood, California)
- Peter Figen – photography
- Wendi Marafino – photography assistant
- www.dietzdesign.com – design
- Louis Wells – wardrobe
- Jan Golden – make-up
- Bennett Freed – management
