= The Wonders of His Love =

Studio album by Philip Bailey
- Released: 1984
- Recorded: June–October 1983
- Studio: Bill Schnee Studio and Mama Jo's Recording Studio (North Hollywood, California); Hollywood Sound Recorders (Hollywood, California)
- Genre: Gospel
- Length: 43:49
- Label: Myrrh
- Producer: Philip Bailey

Philip Bailey chronology
Continuation (1983)	The Wonders of His Love (1984)	Chinese Wall (1984)

The Wonders of His Love is the second studio album by American singer Philip Bailey, released in 1984 on Myrrh Records. It was his first gospel album, peaking at No. 13 on the Billboard Top Christian Albums chart and No. 17 on the Billboard Top Gospel Albums chart.

== Critical reception ==
Professional ratings
Review scores
Source	Rating
AllMusic	2/5 stars
Musician	(favourable)

The Wonders of His Love was nominated for a Grammy Award in the category of Best Inspirational Performance.

== Track listing ==
Side one
No.	Title	Writer(s)	Length
1.	"I Will No Wise Cast You Out"	music: Skip Scarborough, Tony Haynes; lyrics: Philip Bailey	4:41
2.	"I Want to Know You"	music: George Duke; lyrics: Philip Bailey	4:32
3.	"God Is Love"	Leonard Caston	4:58
4.	"Sing a New Song"	music: Jerry Peters; lyrics: Annester Davis, Jerry Peters	4:58
5.	"Safe in God's Love"	Leonard Caston	3:45

Side two
No.	Title	Writer(s)	Length
1.	"I Am Gold"	music: Jerry Peters, Philip Bailey; lyrics: Terri McFaddin, Philip Bailey	5:04
2.	"He Don't Lie"	Skip Scarborough	4:59
3.	"The Wonders of His Love"	music: Eduardo del Barrio, Philip Bailey; lyrics: Teri DeSario Purse	5:05
4.	"Make Us One"	music: Jerry Peters, Terri McFaddin; lyrics: Terri McFaddin	5:47

== Personnel ==
=== Musicians ===
- Philip Bailey – lead vocals
- Alan Pasqua – synthesizers (1, 5, 7, 9)
- Skip Scarborough – keyboards (1, 7)
- George Duke – keyboards (2, 8), synthesizers (2)
- Jerry Peters – keyboards (3, 4), organ (3, 4), synthesizers (4)
- Leonard Caston Jr. – keyboards (5)
- Charles Williams – keyboards (6, 9)
- Paul Jackson Jr. – guitars (1, 3–8)
- Dann Huff – guitars (2)
- James Jamerson, Jr. – bass (1–3, 5, 7, 9)
- Freddie Washington – bass (4, 6)
- Abraham Laboriel – bass (8)
- Gerry Brown – drums
- Paulinho da Costa – percussion (1, 2, 6, 8)
- Ralph Johnson – percussion (3, 7)
- Don Myrick – saxophone (1)
- Andrew Woolfolk – saxophone (2)
- Rahmlee Michael Davis – trumpet (8)
- Charles Veal Jr. – concertmaster (1, 6, 7, 9)

Background and Guest vocalists

- Philip Bailey – backing vocals
- Carl Carwell – backing vocals (1–7, 9)
- Jeanette Hawes – backing vocals (1–7, 9), vocal solo accompaniment (3)
- Carolyn Caston – backing vocals (3, 5)
- Leonard Caston Jr. – backing vocals (3, 5)
- Margaret Briggs – backing vocals (4, 6)
- Gwen Brown – backing vocals (4, 6, 9)
- Julia Tillman Waters – backing vocals (4, 6, 9)
- Greg Walker – backing vocals (4, 6, 9)
- Winston Ford – backing vocals (7)
- Teri DeSario – lead vocals (8), backing vocals (8)

Music arrangements

- Jerry Peters – horn arrangements (1, 6, 9), string arrangements (1, 6, 7, 9)
- Leonard Caston Jr. – synthesizer arrangements (5)

=== Production ===
- Philip Bailey – producer
- Jack Joseph Puig – recording engineer
- Ross Palone – mixing, second recording engineer
- Steven Ford – second recording engineer
- David Schober – second recording engineer
- Mike Wuellner – mix assistant
- Doug Sax – mastering at The Mastering Lab (Hollywood, California)
- Julius West – liner notes

== Charts ==
Album – Billboard
Year	Chart	Peak position
1984	Billboard Top Contemporary Christian Albums	13
1984	Billboard Top Gospel Albums	17
