= Soul on Jazz =

Studio album by Philip Bailey
- Released: April 23, 2002
- Recorded: September 2001–January 2002
- Studios: Bennett Studios (Englewood, New Jersey); O'Henry Sound Studios (Burbank, California)
- Genre: Jazz
- Length: 51:04
- Label: Heads Up International
- Producers: Philip Bailey; Bob Belden; Scott Kinsey; Myron McKinley

Philip Bailey chronology
Dreams (1999)	Soul on Jazz (2002)	Love Will Find a Way (2019)

Professional ratings
Review scores
Source	Rating
Allmusic	3/5 stars
Jazz Times	(favourable)
Vibe	4/5 stars
All About Jazz	(favourable)
Associated Press	(favourable)

Soul on Jazz is a studio album by American singer Philip Bailey. It was released in April 2002 on Heads Up International Records. The album reached No. 45 on the Billboard Jazz Albums chart.

== Critical reception ==
Christopher Loudon of Jazz Times noted "This new solo effort from Earth, Wind and Fire’s estimable frontman should really be called Soul on the Periphery of Jazz. Like a martini so dry that the vermouth is barely detectable, Bailey's latest is pure soul infused with just a hint of jazz." Loudon added "Reinterpreting jazz treasures both familiar and lesser-known, he moves from triumph to triumph." Ed Hogan of AllMusic gave a 3 out of 5 star rating and wrote "More jazz-oriented than Dreams, Soul on Jazz benefits from the sharing of production chores with Myron McKinley, Bob Belden, and Scott Kinsey. The album is definitely on track." The Associated Press declared "His new solo compilation, mixes two of the most creative forms of music.".."After more than 30 years, Bailey's sound is more innovative than ever."

== Overview ==
On the album, Bailey covers Thelonious Monk's "Ruby, My Dear", Earth, Wind & Fire's "Keep Your Head to the Sky", Joe Zawinul's "Mercy, Mercy, Mercy", Chick Corea's Sometime Ago, Les McCann's "Compared to What" and Herbie Hancock's "Tell Me a Bedtime Story".

== Track listing ==
No.	Title	Writer(s)	Length
1.	"My Indiscretions"	Sir Bailey, Joe Zawinul	4:25
2.	"Dear Ruby (Ruby, My Dear)"	Thelonious Monk, Sally Swisher	4:42
3.	"Compared to What"	Gene McDaniels	4:59
4.	"Nature Boy"	Eden, Ahbez	4:57
5.	"Bop-Skip-Doodle"	Sir Bailey, Wayne "Dj Smash" Cobbs	4:24
6.	"Unrestrained"	Sir Bailey, Myron McKinley	3:48
7.	"Mercy, Mercy, Mercy"	Johnny "Guitar" Watson, Larry Williams, Joe Zawinul	4:51
8.	"Keep Your Head to the Sky"	Maurice White	4:56
9.	"Sometime Ago"	Chick Corea, Neville Potter	3:47
10.	"Tell Me a Bedtime Story"	Herbie Hancock, Jean Hancock	5:14
11.	"On the Red Clay"	Freddie Hubbard, Mark Murphy	5:01

== Personnel ==
=== Musicians ===
- Philip Bailey – lead vocals, handclaps (1), timbales (3), backing vocals (6)
- Scott Kinsey – keyboards (1, 4, 5, 9, 11), handclaps (1), programming (5, 11), acoustic piano (9), electric piano (10)
- Myron McKinley – acoustic piano (2–4, 6, 7), keyboards (2, 3, 6–8), melodica (2, 6)
- DJ Smash – programming (5)
- Mike “Dino” Campbell – guitars (1–5, 7–9, 11) [Not the same Mike Campbell that played with Tom Petty].
- Alan Burroughs – acoustic guitar (2)
- John Hart – lead guitar (9, 11), guitars (10)
- David Dyson – bass guitar (2, 3, 6, 7)
- Ira Coleman – acoustic bass (4, 5, 8–11)
- Billy Kilson – drums
- Don Alias – congas (1–4, 8–10), percussion (1, 2, 4, 6, 8–10), handclaps (1)
- Dave Love – handclaps (1)
- Daniel de los Reyes – congas (7)
- Bob Belden – soprano saxophone (1), handclaps (1)
- Lou Marini – alto saxophone (3, 7)
- Ronnie Cuber – baritone saxophone (3)
- Scott Wendholt – trumpet (1, 4)
- Billy Baker – backing vocals (1, 5)
- Charmaine Cousins – backing vocals (1–3, 5–8, 11)
- David Whitworth – backing vocals (1, 2, 5, 6, 11)
- Don Corey Washington – backing vocals (2, 3, 7, 8, 11)
- Robert Brookins – backing vocals (6)

Music arrangements

- Scott Kinsey – arrangements (1, 5, 9, 11), orchestration (4)
- Myron McKinley – arrangements (2, 3, 6–8)
- David Whitworth – BGV arrangements (3, 7, 8)
- Bob Belden – arrangements (4, 10)
- Philip Bailey – arrangements (5, 6, 8)

=== Production ===
- Dave Love – executive producer
- Philip Bailey – producer
- Bob Belden – producer (1, 4, 5, 9–11)
- Scott Kinsey – producer (1, 4, 5, 9–11)
- Myron McKinley – producer (2, 3, 6–8)
- Robert Friedrich – engineer, mixing
- Dave Kowlaski – BGV recording
- Andy Ackland – technical engineer
- Mark Fraunfelder – assistant engineer
- Tim Stritmater – assistant engineer
- Tim Lauber – mix assistant
- Louis F. Hemsey – mastering at GKS Mastering (Hollywood, California)
- Robert Hoffman – art direction, design
- Peter Figen – cover photography
- R. Andrew Lepley – inner sleeve photography
- Trinity Bailey – stylist
- Bennett Freed – management
