= Continuation (album) =

Studio album by Philip Bailey
- Released: January 1983
- Recorded: June–October 1982
- Studios: Le Gonks West (West Hollywood, California); Ocean Way Recording (Hollywood, California); The Complex and Record Plant (Los Angeles, California); Soundcastle (Santa Monica, California)
- Genre: R&B
- Length: 36:37
- Label: Columbia
- Producer: George Duke

Philip Bailey chronology
Continuation (1983)	The Wonders of His Love (1984)

Continuation is the debut solo album by American singer Philip Bailey, released in January 1983 on Columbia Records. The album peaked at No. 19 on the US Billboard Top Soul Albums chart, No. 36 on the Dutch Pop Albums chart and No. 31 on the Swedish Pop Albums chart.

== Critical reception ==
Professional ratings
Review scores
Source	Rating
AllMusic	3/5 stars
Boston Globe	(favourable)
Morning Call	(favourable)
Blues & Soul	(favourable)
Stereo Review	(favourable)
New York Daily News	(favourable)

Martin Basch of the Boston Globe claimed "This Is the rare R&B dance album where each cut is outstanding. He added "the album will seduce you with its charm and beat." Ross Bossineau of AllMusic said "Expatriate Earth, Wind & Fire vocalist Philip Bailey stepped out on his own with Continuation, his first solo recording. Here Bailey got to explore some less-cluttered grooves than in EWF, and he also sang in his natural tenor rather than being limited to his falsetto." Phyl Garland of Stereo Review wrote "'Continuation,' Bailey's debut solo album, is not as consistently excellent as some of his previous collaborations. There is a somewhat lower level of musical imagination in the material he sings here (some of his own compositions). But the album does demonstrate that he is an artist with a singular and highly polished vocal style who is capable of generating considerable heat through his incisive attack, zestful delivery, and firm professionalism. There's not a sloppy note to be heard here".

Hugh Wyatt of the New York Daily News stated "The first mistake singer Philip Bailey has made in his first solo album is in using many people associated with Earth, Wind and Fire, the band with whom he has performed as co-lead singer for the last 12 years. Thus, there isn't anything significantly new despite the fact that it's a top-notch recording. Bailey's voice remains one of the most spectacular instruments in contemporary rhythm 'n' blues." Connie Johnson of the Los Angeles Times found Continuation "contains the kind of brash wit that usually escapes EWF. Bailey, co-lead singer of EW&F, decorates the lyrics with a striking jazz-colored touch." Sharon Davis of Blues & Soul found that "With George Duke producing and vocal support from Sister Sledge, Jeffrey Osborne, and others, the music here is rich and layered; totally immersing itself into emotional experiences delivered by one of soul music's finest voices."

== Track listing ==
Side one
No.	Title	Writer(s)	Length
1.	"I Know"	Gerard McMahon	4:04
2.	"Trapped"	Philip Bailey, Tony Haynes, Robert Brookins	5:29
3.	"It's Our Time" (Duet with Deniece Williams)	Garry Glenn	3:51
4.	"Desire"	Jerry Knight	5:29

Side two
No.	Title	Writer(s)	Length
5.	"I'm Waiting For Your Love"	David Wolinski	4:16
6.	"Vaya (Go With Love)"	George Duke, Philip Bailey, Nathan East, Nan O'Byrne	4:20
7.	"The Good Guy's Supposed To Get The Girls"	Philip Bailey, Tony Haynes, Robert Brookins	4:16
8.	"Your Boyfriend's Back"	Philip Bailey, David Wolinski, Marti Sharron	4:55

== Personnel ==
- Philip Bailey – lead vocals, backing vocals (1–3, 5–8), LinnDrum (6), percussion (7)
- George Duke – acoustic piano (1, 3), Prophet-5 (1, 3, 4, 6, 8), Rhodes electric piano (3, 4, 6), Moog bass (4), marimba (4), LinnDrum (6), backing vocals (6)
- Robert Brookins – Rhodes electric piano (2, 7), Minimoog (2, 7) Korg Polysix (2, 7), LinnDrum (7)
- David "Hawk" Wolinski – Rhodes electric piano (5, 8), Roland Jupiter 8 (5, 8), LinnDrum (5, 8), Roland MC-4 Microcomposer (8)
- Neiman Tillar – sound effects (8)
- Paul Jackson Jr. – guitars (1, 5, 8)
- Michael Sembello – guitars (2–4)
- David Williams – guitars (6)
- Irvin Kramer – guitars (7)
- Roland Bautista – guitar solo (8)
- Nathan East – bass (1, 6, 8)
- Freddie Washington – bass (2, 3)
- James Gadson – drums (1)
- Ricky Lawson – drums (2–4)
- Paulinho da Costa – percussion (2, 6, 7)
- David Boruff – alto saxophone solo (5)
- Larry Williams – tenor saxophone (7, 8)
- Lew McCreary – trombone (7, 8)
- Gary Grant – trumpet (7, 8)
- Jerry Hey – trumpet (7, 8)
- Lynn Davis – backing vocals (3)
- Jeffrey Osborne – backing vocals (3)
- Deneice Williams – lead vocals (3)
- Sister Sledge – backing vocals (4)
- Carl Caldwell – backing vocals (5, 7)
- Julius Carey – backing vocals (5, 7)
- Winston Ford – backing vocals (5, 7)

Music arrangements

- Philip Bailey – rhythm arrangements
- George Duke – rhythm arrangements
- Robert Brookins – rhythm arrangements (2)
- David "Hawk" Wolinski – rhythm arrangements (5, 8)
- Nathan East – rhythm arrangements (6)
- Jerry Hey – horn arrangements (7, 8)

String section (Tracks 2, 3 & 7)

- George Del Barrio – string arrangements and conductor
- Bill Hughes – string contractor
- Gerald Vinci – concertmaster
- Ron Cooper, Ray Kelley, Earl Madison and Fred Seykora – cello
- Catherine Gottholfer – harp
- Rollice Dale, Pam Goldsmith, Allan Harshman and Dave Schwartz – viola
- Murray Adler, Issy Baker, Brenton Banks, Sherrill Baptist, Tom Buffum, Ron Clark, Ron Folsom, Reg Hill, Marv Limonick, Irma Neuman and Bob Sushel – violin

== Production ==
- Larkin Arnold – executive producer
- George Duke – producer
- Tommy Vicari – recording, remixing
- Peter Chaikin – additional engineer
- Tom Perry – additional engineer
- Barbara Rooney – assistant basic track engineer (2, 3)
- Steve Crimmel – assistant string engineer (2, 3, 7)
- Kevin Eddy – assistant dum engineer (4)
- Nick Spigel – assistant engineer (all vocals and instrumental overdubs), assistant tracking engineer (5–8)
- Mitch Gibson – assistant mix engineer, assistant horn engineer (7, 8)
- Brent Averill – studio technician for Le Gonks West
- Erik Zobler – two-track sequencing and editing
- Brian Gardner – mastering at Allen Zentz Mastering (San Clemente, California)
- Cheryl R. Brown – production assistant
- Lane/Donald – design
- Bobby Holland – photography
- Julius West – liner notes
- Cavallo, Ruffalo and Fargnoli Management – exclusive representation

== Charts ==
Year	Chart	Position
1983	US Billboard Top Soul Albums	19
1983	Dutch Pop Albums	36
1983	Swedish Pop Albums	31
1983	US Billboard 200	71

Singles
Year	Single	Chart	Position
1983	"I Know"	US Billboard Hot R&B Singles	10
1984	"Trapped"	US Billboard Hot R&B Singles	43
