= I Know (Philip Bailey song) =

Single by Philip Bailey

from the album Continuation
- B-side: "The Good Guy's Supposed to Get the Girls"
- Released: 1983
- Genre: R&B, soul
- Label: Columbia
- Songwriter: Gerard McMahon
- Producer: George Duke

Philip Bailey singles chronology
"I Know (Philip Bailey song)" (1983)	"Trapped" (1984)

"I Know" is the debut solo single by American singer-songwriter Philip Bailey, released in 1983 by Columbia Records. The song reached No. 10 on the Billboard Hot Black Singles chart.

== Overview ==
"I Know" was produced by George Duke and composed by Gerard McMahon.

The single's B-side is "The Good Guy's Supposed to Get the Girls". Both "I Know" and "The Good Guy's Supposed to Get the Girls" are from Bailey's 1983 album Continuation.

== Critical reception ==
Eleanor Levy of Record Mirror claimed, "This first solo single from Earth, Wind & Fire's lead singer is just what you'd expect - a pleasant melody, beautifully performed. No surprises but a lot of class." Paul Willistein of The Morning Call proclaimed that George Duke's "keyboard and synthesizer part turn I Know into (Continuation)'s best cut".

== Personnel ==
- Philip Bailey – lead vocals, backing vocals
- George Duke – piano [acoustic], synthesizer [Prophet V]
- Nathan East – bass
- James Gadson – drums
- Paul Jackson Jr. – guitar
