= Easy Lover =

1984 single by Philip Bailey and Phil Collins

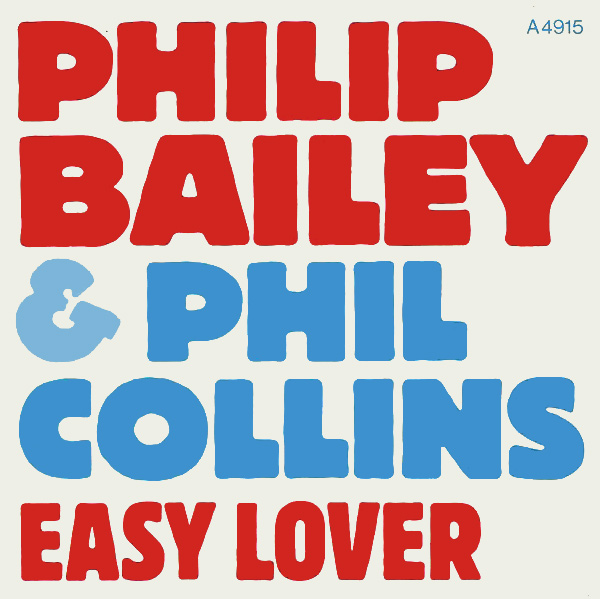
- Front cover of the UK 7" single.

Single by Philip Bailey and Phil Collins

from the album Chinese Wall
- B-side: "Woman"
- Released: 6 November 1984
- Recorded: 1984
- Studio: Townhouse (London); The Complex (Los Angeles); Ocean Way Recording (Los Angeles)
- Genre: Pop rock; dance-rock; pop; soul
- Length: 4:54 (single version); 5:03 (album version)
- Label: Columbia
- Songwriters: Philip Bailey; Phil Collins; Nathan East
- Producer: Phil Collins

Philip Bailey singles chronology
"Photogenic Memory" (1984)	"Easy Lover" (1984)	"Walking on the Chinese Wall" (1984)

Phil Collins singles chronology
"Against All Odds (Take a Look at Me Now)" (1984)	"Easy Lover" (1984)	"Sussudio" (1985)

Music video
- "Easy Lover" on YouTube

"Easy Lover" is a song performed by Philip Bailey of Earth, Wind & Fire and Phil Collins of Genesis, jointly written and composed by Bailey, Collins, and Nathan East. The song first appeared on Bailey's 1984 solo album, Chinese Wall. Collins has performed the song in his live concerts, and it appears on his 1990 album, Serious Hits... Live! (with Fred White and Arnold McCuller performing Bailey's original part), his 1998 compilation album, ...Hits, and his 2016 career-spanning compilation The Singles. It is Bailey's only US top 40 hit as a solo artist.

The song was a No. 1 hit in several countries, including Canada, the Netherlands, Ireland, and the United Kingdom. In the U.S., it spent 23 weeks on the Billboard Hot 100 chart, including 7 weeks in the top 10, and peaked at No. 2 during the weeks of 2 February 1985 and 9 February 1985, behind "I Want to Know What Love Is" by Foreigner. On the UK Singles Chart, it reached No. 1, staying there for four weeks. The single sold over a million copies in the U.S. and was certified Gold in March, 1985, as the RIAA requirement for a platinum single disc was not lowered to one million units until 1989. In addition, "Easy Lover" has been certified platinum by the British Phonographic Industry (BPI) and Music Canada. Despite Collins' popularity in Australia, its lowly position on that country's chart was because of a record company dispute.

"Easy Lover" won an MTV Video Music Award for Best Overall Performance in a Video in 1985 and was Grammy Award nominated for Best Pop Performance by a Duo or Group with Vocals in 1986.

The song was used by the World Wrestling Federation as the theme for the first WrestleMania in March 1985 at Madison Square Garden.

== Background ==
In 1984, Phil Collins was hired as the producer for Philip Bailey's solo album, Chinese Wall. According to Collins, Bailey approached him at the end of the sessions for the album and asked him to write a song together as filler for the album (according to Casey Kasem on AT40s year end countdown that year). In "Phil Collins: My Life in 15 Songs", a 2016 interview he gave to Rolling Stone magazine, Collins said of the song: "So we just started having a jam one night, and went round and round and turned it into a verse and a chorus. We recorded it that night so we wouldn't forget it. That song doesn't sound like any particular era. It's just fantastic." According to the official sheet music, the song is in the key of F minor and has a tempo of 105 BPM, though the studio recording has a tempo of 130 BPM.

== Music video ==
The song's music video, filmed at Ewarts Studios, London, England, humorously depicts the making of a music video. It was produced by Paul Flattery and directed by Jim Yukich.

== Track listings ==
UK 7-inch single

- "Easy Lover"
- "Woman" – 5:04

UK 12-inch

- "Easy Lover" (extended re-mixed version) – 6:18
- "Woman" – 5:04

European 7-inch

- "Easy Lover" – 5:05
- "Woman" – 5:05

Hong Kong 12-inch

- "Easy Lover" (extended dance remix) – 6:21
- "Woman" – 5:05

== Personnel ==
- Philip Bailey – lead and backing vocals
- Phil Collins – lead and backing vocals, drums, keyboards, production
- Daryl Stuermer – electric lead & rhythm guitar
- Nathan East – bass guitar
- Lesette Wilson – keyboards

== Charts ==
=== Weekly charts ===
Weekly chart performance for "Easy Lover"
Chart (1985)	Peak position
Australia (Kent Music Report)	74
Austria (Ö3 Austria Top 40)	21
Belgium (Ultratop 50 Flanders)	4
Brazil (ABPD)	2
Canada Retail Singles (The Record)	1
Canada Top Singles (RPM)	1
Canada Adult Contemporary (RPM)	16
Europe (European Top 100 Singles)	1
Europe (European Airplay Top 50)	1
Finland (Suomen virallinen lista)	5
France (SNEP)	14
Ireland (IRMA)	1
Italy (Musica e dischi)	21
Netherlands (Dutch Top 40)	1
Netherlands (Single Top 100)	2
New Zealand (Recorded Music NZ)	2
South Africa (Springbok Radio)	6
Spain (AFYVE)	11
Sweden (Sverigetopplistan)	10
Switzerland (Schweizer Hitparade)	8
UK Singles (Official Charts)	1
UK Airplay (Music & Media)	1
US Billboard Hot 100	2
US Adult Contemporary (Billboard)	15
US Dance Club Songs (Billboard)	7
US Dance Singles Sales (Billboard)	3
US Hot R&B/Hip-Hop Songs (Billboard)	3
US Mainstream Rock Airplay (Billboard)	5
US Cash Box Top 100	1
US Top 100 Black Singles (Cash Box)	4
West Germany (GfK)	5

=== Year-end charts ===
Year-end chart performance for "Easy Lover"
Chart (1985)	Position
Belgium (Ultratop 50 Flanders)	26
Canada Top Singles (RPM)	4
Netherlands (Dutch Top 40)	11
Netherlands (Single Top 100)	22
New Zealand (RIANZ)	42
UK Singles (Gallup)	12
US Billboard Hot 100	12
US 12-inch Singles Sales (Billboard)	47
US Hot Black Singles (Billboard)	33
US Cash Box Top 100	7
US Top 100 Black Contemporary Singles (Cash Box)	27
West Germany (Media Control)	41

== Certifications ==
Certifications for "Easy Lover"
Region	Certification	Certified units/sales
Canada (Music Canada)	Platinum	100,000^{^}
Denmark (IFPI Danmark)	Gold	45,000^{‡}
New Zealand (RMNZ)	Platinum	30,000^{‡}
Spain (Promusicae)	Gold	30,000^{‡}
United Kingdom (BPI) Sales since 2004	2× Platinum	1,200,000^{‡}
United States (RIAA)	Gold	1,000,000^{^}
^{^} Shipments figures based on certification alone.^{‡} Sales+streaming figures based on certification alone.
