= Ellen Land-Weber =

American photographer and author (born 1943)

- Born: March 16, 1943 (age 83); Rochester, New York
- Education: Brown University and University of Iowa
- Occupations: Photographer; author
- Website: ellenlandweber.com

Ellen Land-Weber (born 1943) is an American photographer and author.

In 2000, she authored the book To Save a Life: Stories of Jewish Rescue.

Her work is included in the collections of the National Gallery of Canada and the Smithsonian American Art Museum. and numerous permanent collections.

Exhibited widely since the 1970s, she was known for working with alternative technologies such as the first color copy machine, 3M Color in Color, (solo exhibition at San Francisco Museum of Modern Art, 1978).

She was one of 24 photographers commissioned by the Seagram company to document every county courthouse for the US Bicentennial, now housed in the U.S. Library of Congress Seagram County Courthouse.

As a member of the photography collective “Water in the West” she has been documenting the Arcata Marsh and Wildlife Refuge since the 1990s, archived at the Center for Creative Photography, University of Arizona, Tucson Arizona.

She has been the recipient of numerous Artists Grants from the Polaroid Corporation, working in every format from SX70 to 20x24.

She held leadership positions in the Society for Photographic Education, Treasurer 1979–1981, Secretary 1981–1983.

== Works, permanent collections and exhibitions ==
=== Works ===
- The Passionate Collector, 1980 ISBN 978-0671252540
- To Save a Life: Stories of Holocaust Rescue, University of Illinois Press, 2000 ISBN 978-0252025150
- Percy Faith Corazon album cover photo collage by Ellen Land-Weber
- Herb Pedersen Southwest album cover photo by Ellen Land-Weber
- High Voltage (4) High Voltage album cover photo by Ellen Land-Weber

=== Permanent collections ===
- U.S. Library of Congress Seagram County Courthouse Archive
- Smithsonian American Art Museum
- Norton Simon Museum, Pasadena, California
- The Museum of Fine Arts, Houston, Texas
- The Art Institute of Chicago
- George Eastman Museum, Rochester, NY
- Visual Studies Workshop, Rochester, New York
- National Gallery of Canada

=== Solo exhibitions ===
- Sheldon Museum of Art, Lincoln, Nebraska, 1975
- San Francisco Museum of Modern Art, 1978
- University Museum and Galleries, California State University Long Beach, 1982
- Todd Madigan Gallery, CSU Bakersfield, California, 1992
- Richard J. Daley Center, Chicago, Illinois, 1998
- Morris Graves Museum of Art, Eureka California, 2001

=== Group exhibitions ===
- SF Camerawork gallery Archives 1977 "The Instant Image" Ellen Land-Weber, Ted Orland and Barbara Astman
- FotoFest 2004, Houston Texas March 12-April 12, 2004
- Humboldt State University First Street Gallery Village of Old Believer's, Siberia, 2008
- Humboldt State University Third Street Gallery, "A Moment in Time" October 2013

== Awards ==
- National Endowment for the Arts Individual Artist Grants: 1975, 1979, 1982
- Fulbright Senior Fellowship 1993
- Humboldt State University Scholar of the Year 2005

== Press ==
- The Passionate Collector, Art Forum, December 1980
- Ellen Land-Weber in "Proof: Los Angeles Art and the Photograph 1960–1980", text by Charles Desmarais, published by Fellows of Contemporary Art, Los Angeles, 1992
- "Images of Altruism" by Bob Doran, North Coast Journal Weekly, October 5, 2000
- "Visions: An afternoon with Ellen Land-Weber", by Bob Doran, North Coast Journal Weekly, February 3, 2005
- Scotia Past: A trip back in time to a company town at the crossroads, Ellen Land-Weber, North Coast Journal Weekly, March 22, 2007
- "Altruistic Personality? How Rescue in the Holocaust Was Not Entirely Selfless,"
- Melanie Parker, on Ellen Land-Weber’s “To Save A Life,” March 14, 2008
- "Facing Others: Portraits from New Guinea" at F Street Gallery, Times Standard, Eureka California May 31, 2018
- "Scotia Past" illustrated cover story by Ellen Land-Weber, about the company town Scotia, published in North Coast Journal of Politics, People and Art: March 22–28, 2007 vol. 18, No.13
