= Twins (Philip Bailey and Little Richard song) =

"Twins (Philip Bailey song)"

Single by Philip Bailey & Little Richard

from the album Twins Soundtrack
- Released: 1988
- Genre: R&B, soul
- Label: Epic Records
- Songwriter(s): Skip Scarborough, Lorrin Bates
- Producer(s): Rhett Lawrence

"Twins" is a song by Philip Bailey & Little Richard released as a single in 1988 by Epic Records. The song reached No. 16 on the Dutch Pop Singles chart and No. 36 on the Belgian Pop Singles chart.

== Overview ==
Twins was produced by Rhett Lawrence and composed by Skip Scarborough with Lorrin Bates. The song also came off the soundtrack to the 1988 feature film Twins.

== Accolades ==
"Twins" was nominated for a Golden Globe in the category of Best Original Song.

== Credits ==
- Backing Vocals – Alexandra Brown, Marlena Jeter, Maxi Anderson, Philip Bailey
- Electric Guitar, Lead Guitar, Soloist – Michael Landau
- Engineer – Jeffrey 'Woody' Woodruff
- Keyboards [Additional] – Jeff Lorber
- Keyboards, Drum Programming, Bass [Moog], Synthesizer [Fairlight], Programmed By – Rhett Lawrence
- Producer – Rhett Lawrence
- Producer [Additional], Mixed By – Keith Cohen, Steve Beltran
- Producer [Assisted By] – Liz Cluse
- Written-By – Lorrin "Smokey" Bates, Skip Scarborough
