= Philip Bailey =

American musician (born 1951)

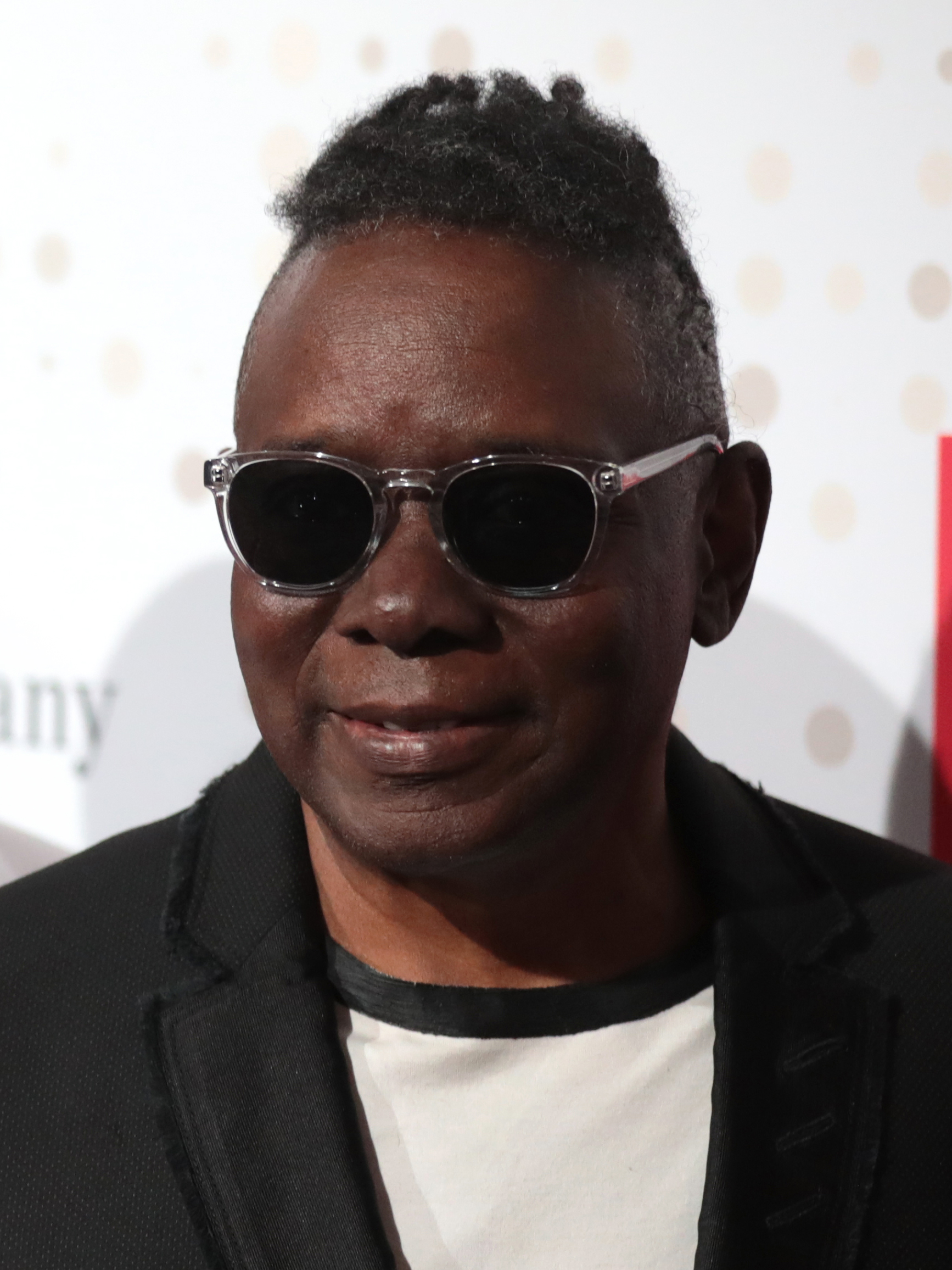
- Bailey in 2023

Background information
- Born: Philip James Bailey; May 8, 1951 (age 75); Denver, Colorado, U.S.
- Genres: R&B; jazz; gospel; soul; pop; funk; rock
- Occupations: Singer; songwriter; musician; actor
- Instruments: Vocals; percussion; kalimba
- Years active: 1970–present
- Labels: Columbia; Myrrh; Word; Heads Up; Verve
- Member of: Earth, Wind & Fire
- Website: philipbailey.com

Philip James Bailey (born May 8, 1951) is an American singer, songwriter and percussionist, best known as an early member and one of the two lead singers (along with group founder Maurice White) of the band Earth, Wind & Fire. Noted for his four-octave vocal range and distinctive falsetto register, Bailey was inducted into the Rock and Roll Hall of Fame and the Vocal Group Hall of Fame as a member of Earth, Wind & Fire. Bailey was also inducted into the Songwriters Hall of Fame for his work with the band.

Bailey has released several solo albums, the most notable being Chinese Wall, released in 1984, which earned a Grammy nomination for Best R&B Vocal Performance, Male. This LP included the hit single, "Easy Lover", a duet with Phil Collins, who also produced the album. The track won an MTV Video Music Award for Best Overall Performance in a Video in 1985, was nominated for an American Music Award in the category of Favorite Pop/Rock Video, and earned a Grammy nomination for Best Pop Performance by a Duo or Group With Vocals. Bailey has in all won seven Grammys out of 21 nominations.

In May 2008, Bailey was bestowed with an honorary Doctorate of Music from Berklee College of Music. During the 2008 commencement ceremony at Berklee, he gave the commencement speech. He was later inducted, in November 2017, to the Colorado Music Hall of Fame.

== Life and career ==
=== Early days ===
Bailey was born and raised in Denver, Colorado. He attended Denver's East High School. He later attended the Metropolitan State University of Denver and the University of Colorado thereafter. Bailey was also in a local R&B band called Friends & Love. Some of Bailey's early influences included jazz musicians such as Miles Davis, John Coltrane and Max Roach, the Motown sound, in particular the music of Stevie Wonder, and he was also largely influenced by female singers such as Sarah Vaughan and Dionne Warwick.

=== Earth, Wind & Fire ===
In 1972, while attending the University of Colorado, Bailey was invited to join the band Earth, Wind & Fire by founder and bandleader Maurice White. Soon afterwards he solely sang lead vocals with his falsetto on songs such as "Devotion", "Keep Your Head to the Sky", "Reasons", "Fantasy", "Star", "I've Had Enough", "Turn on (The Beat Box)", "When Love Goes Wrong", "Guiding Lights", and "My Promise". Bailey also shared lead vocals with White on tunes like "Shining Star", "Getaway", "September", "Sing a Song", "Serpentine Fire", "Saturday Nite", "Can't Hide Love", "That's the Way of the World", and "Boogie Wonderland" with The Emotions.

During the mid-1990s Maurice White largely ended his touring days, leading to Bailey then becoming the on-stage frontman of Earth, Wind & Fire. As of now he still shares the stage with longtime group members, bassist Verdine White and vocalist/percussionist Ralph Johnson. With his four octave vocal range, Bailey mostly sings in his falsetto, and sometimes alike the tenor of Maurice White, whilst illustrating his vocal versatility.

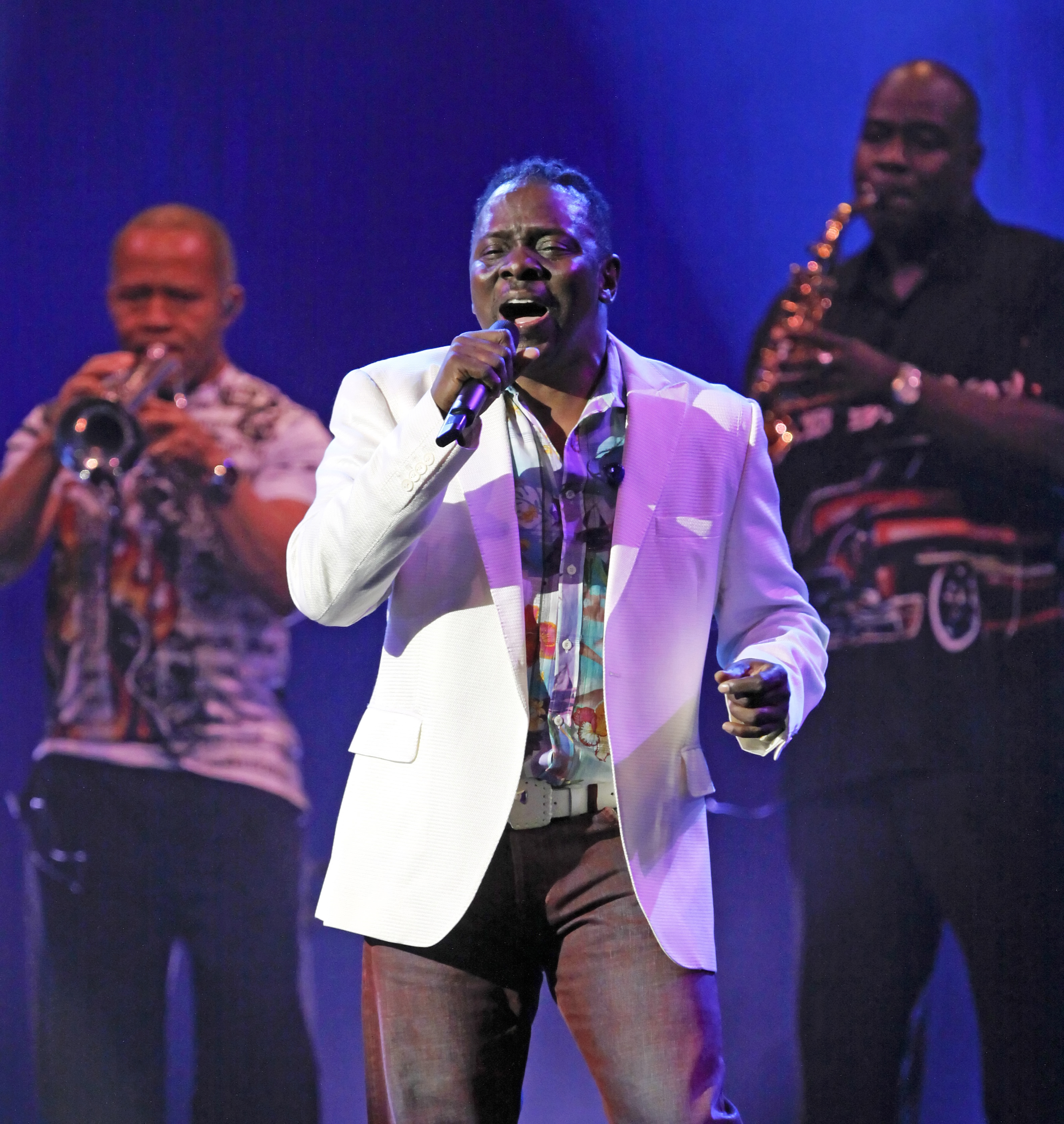
Bailey performing in 2008

=== Solo albums ===
In 1983, Bailey dropped his debut studio album Continuation, on Columbia Records. The album reached No. 19 on the US Billboard Top R&B Albums chart, No. 36 on the Dutch Pop Albums chart and No. 31 on the Swedish Pop Albums chart. Martin Basch of the Boston Globe declared "this is the rare R&B dance album where each cut is outstanding". Hugh Wyatt of the New York Daily News also called Continuation "a top-notch recording". A single off the album titled "I Know" rose to No. 10 on the US Billboard Hot R&B Songs chart.

The following year, Bailey released his third solo — and second secular — album Chinese Wall on Columbia. The album reached No. 22 on the Billboard 200 chart and No. 10 on the Billboard Top R&B/Hip-Hop Albums chart. The album was certified Gold in the US by the RIAA. The album produced Bailey's biggest solo hit "Easy Lover", a duet with Phil Collins that rose to No. 1 on the UK Singles Chart and No. 2 on the Billboard Hot 100 chart. The single "Walking On the Chinese Wall" reached No. 46 on the Billboard Hot 100 and No. 34 on the Billboard Hits of the World Britain.

During 1986 Bailey went on to issue his fourth studio album, titled Inside Out on Columbia. The album reached No. 30 on the US Billboard Top R&B Albums chart, No. 29 on the Swiss Pop Albums chart and No. 30 on the Swedish Pop Albums chart. Carlo Wolff of the Boston Globe wrote "Bailey's most coherent and relaxed solo album chronicles walk through city streets, his eyes turned toward the heavens". Thom Duffy of the Orlando Sentinel said "on this new album, Bailey aims for a polished yet punchy funk and ballad style."

A single from the album entitled "State of the Heart" reached No. 20 on the US Billboard Hot R&B Songs chart.

During 1994, Bailey issued his self titled fifth studio album on Zoo Entertainment. Artists including Brian McKnight, Chuckii Booker and PM Dawn guested on the LP. Carol Cooper of Newsday wrote, "Philip Bailey takes another step forward for neo-traditionalism in black music, with the sensitive gentleman-crooner triumphantly ascendant." Michael Eric Dyson of Rolling Stone stated "In the hands of a lesser talent, some of these songs might barely seep through the cracks, less than memorable fare conjured up to please a legend. But Bailey's grace and magic, apparent throughout, redeem the recordings." Dyson added "What's remarkable above all on this album is that Bailey's brilliant falsetto retains its sweet purity, even as he employs more of a pleasing baritone than he has revealed before. While that alone doesn't compensate for some of the just-OK stuff he has to work with, it delights nonetheless."

A single called "Here With Me" rose to No. 33 on the Billboard Adult R&B Songs chart.

Bailey went on to release his first jazz album, titled Dreams in 1999 on Heads Up International records. The album featured artists such as Gerald Albright, Grover Washington, Jr. and Pat Metheny. It reached No. 43 on the Billboard Jazz Albums chart. Paula Edelstein of All About Jazz said "Philip sings with the spiritual essence from on high and with the finesse and soul of the Song Master that he is. This CD is worth the wait". Al Hunter Jr. of the Philadelphia Daily News wrote ""Dreams" is an excellent showcase for Bailey" adding "Bailey serves up a jazz-flavored disc that is as impressive as his four-octave singing range." During 2002 he released Soul on Jazz, his sophomore jazz album once again on Heads Up. The album rose to No. 45 upon the Billboard Jazz Albums chart. Christopher Loudon of Jazz Times proclaimed "reinterpreting jazz treasures both familiar and lesser-known, he moves from triumph to triumph." The Associated Press declared "His new solo compilation, mixes two of the most creative forms of music.".."After more than 30 years, Bailey's sound is more innovative than ever."

Bailey then issued in 2019 his third jazz album entitled Love Will Find A Way on Verve Records. That album reached No. 1 on both the Billboard Top Jazz Albums chart and the Billboard Contemporary Jazz Albums chart.

Music critic Ann Powers of NPR placed Love Will Find a Way at No. 5 on her list of the Top Ten Albums of 2019. Phil Freeman of Stereogum gave Love Will Find a Way an honorable mention in his list of the Ten Best Jazz Albums of 2019. Bailey also won Soul Act of the Year at the 2020 Jazz FM Awards.

=== Gospel ===
Bailey featured on Andraé Crouch's 1979 Grammy winning album I'll Be Thinking of You and alongside Maurice White on Walter Hawkins' 1980 Grammy nominated album, The Hawkins Family.

In 1980, Bailey joined friends, Deniece Williams, Billy Davis and Marilyn McCoo to present a gospel show, called "Jesus At the Roxy", at a Los Angeles club named The Roxy. Williams later said "God did something miraculous. Over three hundred people were saved." After that, both Bailey and Williams decided to pursue careers in Christian music.

During 1984, Bailey issued his first gospel album titled The Wonders of His Love on Myrrh Records. The album reached No. 13 on the Billboard Christian Albums chart and No. 17 on the Billboard Top Gospel Albums chart. The Wonders of His Love was also Grammy nominated in the category of Best Inspirational Performance.

His second gospel album Triumph was released in 1986 on Horizon Records. The LP reached No. 18 on the Top Christian Albums chart and No. 33 on the Billboard Top Gospel Albums chart. Triumph also won a Grammy for Best Gospel Performance, Male.

During 1989 he released his third gospel album titled Family Affair on Myrrh Records. The album reached No. 37 on the Billboard Top Gospel Albums chart.

Bailey later played percussion and sang on the King Baptist Church Mass Choir's 1990 album Holding on to Jesus' Hand.

=== Work with other artists ===
Bailey sang on Jazz bassist Alphonso Johnson's 1976 LP Yesterday's Dreams. He later played percussion alongside Verdine White on bass upon the track "Tahiti Hut" composed by both Maurice White and Eumir Deodato from Deodato's 1978 album Love Island. He also sang on Ronnie Laws' 1978 album Flame.

Bailey went on to produce Free Life's lone self-titled album and Kinsman Dazz's debut LP Kinsman Dazz both in 1978 and work as an arranger and guest artist on their sophomore 1979 album Dazz. As a band, Kinsman Dazz later became known as the Dazz Band. Bailey also collaborated as a vocalist with Ramsey Lewis on his 1980 LP Routes, Stanley Turrentine on his 1981 album Tender Togetherness and Deniece Williams on her 1983 Grammy nominated album I'm So Proud.

As well he guested on Stevie Wonder's 1985 In Square Circle album, Kenny Loggins' 1985 LP Vox Humana, Ray Parker Jr.'s 1987 album After Dark and Anita Pointer's 1987 LP Love for What It Is. Bailey also collaborated with Julio Iglesias on his 1988 album Non Stop and Deniece Williams on her 1988 album As Good As It Gets. Bailey then collaborated with Little Richard on the title tune of the soundtrack to the 1988 feature film Twins. That song reached No. 16 on the Dutch Pop Singles chart and No. 36 on the Belgian Pop Singles chart. "Twins" was also nominated for a Golden Globe in the category of Best Original Song.

He later featured on Nancy Wilson's 1989 LP A Lady with a Song, Dianne Reeves' 1990 album Never Too Far and George Duke and Stanley Clarke's 1990 LP 3. Bailey also guested on jazz group Fourplay's 1991 self-titled debut album, Ronnie Laws' 1992 LP Deep Soul, George Duke's 1992 album Snapshot, Fourplay's 1993 sophomore LP Between the Sheets and Chante Moore's 1994 album A Love Supreme.

Bailey then featured on Keiko Matsui's 1994 LP Doll, Doc Powell's 1996 album Inner City Blues, George Duke's 2000 Grammy nominated album Cool, Boney James's 2006 LP Shine, Deniece Williams' 2007 album Love Niecy Style and Gerald Albright's 2008 Grammy nominated LP Sax for Stax.

He later appeared on the song "Fool for You" from CeeLo Green's 2010 album The Lady Killer. "Fool for You" got to No. 1 on the Billboard Adult R&B Songs chart and No. 13 on the Billboard Hot R&B/Hip-Hop Songs chart. That song also won two Grammy Awards in the categories of Best Traditional R&B Performance and Best R&B Song. Bailey also sang on Nathan East's 2017 LP Reverence. A cover of "Serpentine Fire" from that album featuring Bailey, Verdine White and Ralph Johnson reached No. 17 on the Billboard Smooth Jazz Songs chart. Bailey thereafter made a guest appearance on Chick Corea's 2018 album Chinese Butterfly.

He also provided vocals on Travis Scott's "Stop Trying to Be God", which also features fellow musicians Stevie Wonder, Kid Cudi, and James Blake and appeared on Scott's 2018 album Astroworld.

=== In other media ===
Bailey appeared in a 1995 Chicago staging of Raisin, the Broadway musical based on A Raisin In The Sun.

On October 27, 2007, Bailey sang "God Bless America" during the seventh-inning stretch in Game 3 of the 2007 World Series held at Coors Field, Denver, Colorado. This was the first World Series game that was ever played in his hometown of Denver. He also threw out the ceremonial first pitch on June 30, 2012, in an MLB game between the Tampa Bay Rays and the Detroit Tigers held at Tropicana Field, St. Petersburg, Florida.

== Accolades ==
=== Grammy Awards ===
The Grammy Awards are awarded annually by the National Academy of Recording Arts and Sciences. Bailey has received one award out of four solo nominations.

Year	Category	Nominated work	Result
1983	Best Inspirational Performance	The Wonders of His Love	Nominated
1985	Best R&B Vocal Performance, Male	Chinese Wall	Nominated
1985	Best Pop Performance by a Duo or Group with Vocal	"Easy Lover"	Nominated
1985	Best Gospel Performance, Male	Triumph	Won

== Discography ==
- Continuation (1983)
- The Wonders of His Love (1984)
- Chinese Wall (1984)
- Triumph (1986)
- Inside Out (1986)
- Family Affair (1989)
- Philip Bailey (1994)
- Life and Love (1998)
- Dreams (1999)
- Soul on Jazz (2002)
- Love Will Find a Way (2019)

== Bibliography ==
- Bailey, Philip; Keith Zimmerman; Kent Zimmerman (2014). Shining Star: Braving the Elements of Earth, Wind & Fire. New York: Viking. ISBN 9780670785889. OCLC 852221287.
