= Helen Reddy discography =

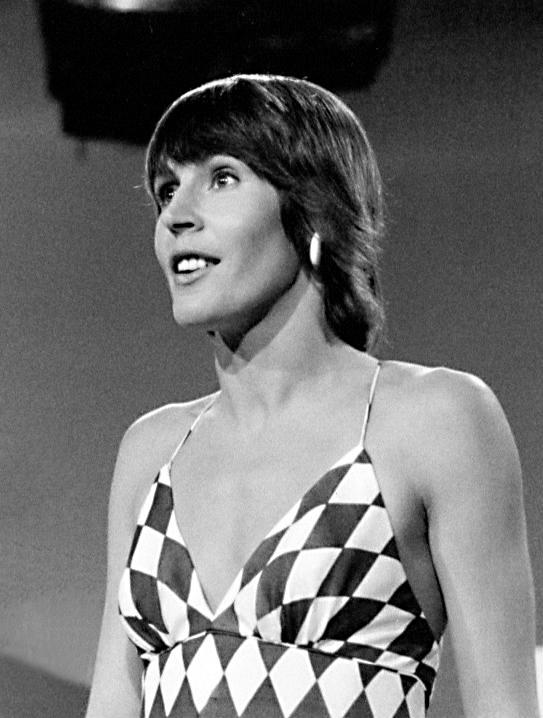
- Reddy in 1973
- Studio albums: 18
- Soundtrack albums: 1
- Live albums: 1
- Compilation albums: 15
- Singles: 31
- Video albums: 1

Australian-American singer Helen Reddy (1941–2020), often referred to as the "Queen of 70s Pop", recorded 18 studio albums, seven of which have achieved sales of 500,000 units in the US for which they were awarded Gold certification by the Recording Industry Association of America. One of those seven, I Am Woman, eventually went Platinum by reaching sales of one million copies, and her first compilation album, Helen Reddy's Greatest Hits, was awarded Double Platinum status in 1992 for hitting the two million sales mark. The respective US and Canadian album charts in Billboard and RPM magazine each had appearances by 10 of these LPs during the 1970s.

Reddy's singles had the most success on what was then Billboard's Easy Listening chart (later known as Adult Contemporary), where eight of her 24 entries reached number one. Of those 24, 20 also made the Billboard Hot 100, with six of those hitting the top 10, including three ("I Am Woman", "Delta Dawn", and "Angie Baby") that reached number one. Of those 20 Hot 100 entries, 19 were also Canadian pop hits in RPM, and four of them – the three number ones and her number three hit "Leave Me Alone (Ruby Red Dress)" – earned Gold certification from the RIAA for the sales of one million copies that was the requirement for singles at that time.

== Capitol years (1971–1980) ==
Capitol Records executive Artie Mogull sensed that a hit record could be made with the song "I Don't Know How to Love Him" from the 1970 musical Jesus Christ Superstar, and since Reddy's then-husband/manager, Jeff Wald, was tenacious in contacting him about getting Reddy her first recording session in the United States, he decided to give Reddy her big break. The success of the single led to a 1971 album of the same name and a 10-year stay with the label. That album included her first recording of "I Am Woman", which was only released as a single after being rerecorded for the 1972 film Stand Up and Be Counted. The new recording became the first of her three songs to reach number one on the Hot 100 in addition to providing the title of her third album. It also reached number two Adult Contemporary in the US, as did its follow-up, "Peaceful", which got as high as number 12 pop.

The five consecutive studio LPs that Reddy recorded between 1973 and 1976 all achieved Gold certification and peaked in the top 20 slots on the album charts in both the US and Canada. The two singles from the first of those five, Long Hard Climb, both had impressive chart runs and achieved their own Gold certification a few months after release in the US. In addition to topping the US pop chart, the first of the two, "Delta Dawn", also made it to number one Adult Contemporary there, and the second, "Leave Me Alone (Ruby Red Dress)", echoed that showing on the latter chart and got as high as number three on the Hot 100. Her first 1974 album, Love Song for Jeffrey, also had two AC number ones, "Keep on Singing" and "You and Me Against the World", that respectively peaked at 15 and 9 on the pop chart. Another two AC number ones came from her second 1974 release, Free and Easy. The first, "Angie Baby", also went to number one pop and achieved Gold certification, while the second, "Emotion", only reached number 22 on the Hot 100.

"Bluebird" was the lead single from her 1975 studio LP No Way to Treat a Lady and only peaked at number 5 Adult Contemporary and number 35 pop, but her next two singles from that album had better showings. "Ain't No Way to Treat a Lady" was yet another AC number one and made it to number eight on the Hot 100, and "Somewhere in the Night" also did well (numbers two AC and 19 pop). Her last Gold album, 1976's Music, Music, included the last of her Adult Contemporary number ones, "I Can't Hear You No More", which had a lower pop chart showing than the previous two, at number 29. That album's second and final single, "Gladiola", was a number 10 AC hit but also became her first domestic single that failed to reach the Hot 100.

Her 1977 album Ear Candy not only ended her hot streak as it stalled at number 75 on Billboard's ranking of the top 200 albums; it also became her last to appear there at all. The first song released from it as a single, "You're My World", became her last Hot 100 entry to make the top 40 and her last Adult Contemporary hit to make the top 10. Her final projects with the label included a concert album (Live in London) and studio efforts flavored by disco (Reddy) and rock (Take What You Find).

== Post-Capitol years (1981–2020) ==
Reddy switched to MCA Records in 1981 and recorded Play Me Out, which yielded "I Can't Say Goodbye to You", her last song to reach either of Billboard's pop or Adult Contemporary charts. When her 1983 follow-up LP Imagination failed to get any attention, she received a letter from MCA notifying her that she was being dropped from the label.

In 1990 Reddy recorded jazz interpretations of several of her hit songs along with new material for Feel So Young, a project she initially released herself that was later repackaged and retitled by other independent labels. 1998's Center Stage was her interpretation of some of her favorite songs from musicals, and her most recent studio effort was the holiday release The Best Christmas Ever in 2000.

== Albums ==
=== Studio albums ===
Title	Album details	Peak chart positions					Certifications
Title	Album details	AUS	CAN	NZ	UK	US	Certifications
I Don't Know How to Love Him	Released: 10 May 1971; Label: Capitol (ST-762)	51	40	—	—	100	RIAA: Gold
Helen Reddy	Released: 8 November 1971; Label: Capitol (ST-857)	—	—	—	—	167	
I Am Woman	Released: 13 November 1972; Label: Capitol (ST-11068)	10	7	—	—	14	AUS: Gold; RIANZ: Gold; RIAA: Platinum
Long Hard Climb	Released: 23 July 1973; Label: Capitol (ST-11213)	16	14	—	—	8	AUS: Gold; RIAA: Gold; RIANZ: Gold
Love Song for Jeffrey	Released: 25 March 1974; Label: Capitol (SO-11284)	20	6	—	—	11	RIAA: Gold
Free and Easy	Released: 22 October 1974; Label: Capitol (ST-11348)	33	9	16	17	8	BPI: Silver; RIAA: Gold; RIANZ: Gold
No Way to Treat a Lady	Released: July 1975; Label: Capitol (ST-11418)	65	13	13	—	11	RIAA: Gold
Music, Music	Released: August 1976; Label: Capitol (ST-11547)	—	14	—	—	16	RIAA: Gold
Ear Candy	Released: April 1977; Label: Capitol (SO-11640)	—	84	—	—	75	
We'll Sing in the Sunshine	Released: July 1978; Label: Capitol (SO-11759)	—	—	—	—	—	
Reddy	Released: July 1979; Label: Capitol (SO-11949)	—	97	—	—	—	
Take What You Find	Released: May 1980; Label: Capitol (SOO 12068)	—	—	—	—	—	
Play Me Out	Released: October 1981; Label: MCA (MCA-5202)	—	—	—	—	—	
Imagination	Released: February 1983; Label: MCA (MCAC 5376)	—	—	—	—	—	
Feel So Young	Released: August 1990; Label: Prestige (CDSGP0124)	—	—	—	—	—	
Center Stage	Released: September 1998; Label: Varèse Sarabande (VSD-5962)	—	—	—	—	—	
The Best Christmas Ever	Released: July 2000; Label: Select Media Concepts (CD-1006)	—	—	—	—	—	
"—" denotes a title that did not chart or was not released in that territory.

=== Live albums ===
Title	Album details
Live in London	Released: 1978; Label: Capitol (SKBO-11873)

=== Compilation albums ===
Title	Album details	Peak chart positions					Certifications
Title	Album details	AUS	CAN	NZ	UK	US	Certifications
Helen Reddy's Greatest Hits	Released: 1975; Label: Capitol (ST 23610)	42	9	1	5	5	ARIA: Gold; BPI: Gold; RIAA: 2× Platinum; RIANZ: Gold
No Way to Treat a Lady	Released: 1984; Label: Capitol (4XL-9025)	—	—	—	—	—	
The Best of Helen Reddy	Released: 1984; Label: EMI (PLAY.260079)	29	—	—	—	—	
Lust for Life	Released: 1984; Label: EMI (PLB-72056)	—	—	—	—	—	
Feel So Young – The Helen Reddy Collection	Released: 1989; Label: Pickwick Music (PWKM 4072)	—	—	—	—	—	
All-Time Greatest Hits	Released: 1991; Label: Capitol (CDL-57400)	—	—	—	—	—	
Basic: Original Hits	Released: 1995; Label: Disky (BA 860932)	—	—	—	—	—	
When I Dream	Released: 1996; Label: Varèse Sarabande (VSD-5683); Notes: songs from Play Me Out and Imagination (1981 & 1983)	—	—	—	—	—	
Love Songs	Released: 1997; Label: EMI Gold (72438562362-2)	—	—	—	—	—	
I Am Woman: The Essential Helen Reddy Collection	Released: September 1998; Label: Razor & Tie (7930182180-2)	—	—	—	—	—	
The Collection	Released: 2000; Label: HMV Easy / EMI (72435294472-9)	—	—	—	—	—	
Absolutely the Best of Helen Reddy	Released: 2003; Label: Varèse Sarabande	—	—	—	—	—	
Come with Me: The Rest of Helen Reddy	Released: 2006; Label: Helen Reddy, Inc.	—	—	—	—	—	
The Woman I Am: The Definitive Collection	Released: 2006; Label: Capitol (09463576132-0)	—	—	—	—	—	
Rarities from the Capitol Vaults	Released: 2009; Label: Collectors' Choice (CCM 2014)	—	—	—	—	—	
"—" denotes a title that did not chart or was not released in that territory.

== Singles ==
Title	Year	Peak chart positions											Album
Title	Year	AUS	CAN	IRE	MEX	NLD	NZ	SA	SWE	UK	US	US AC	Album
"One Way Ticket"	1968	83	—	—	—	—	—	—	—	—	—	—	non-album single
"I Don't Know How to Love Him"	1971	2	8	—	—	23	—	—	14	—	13	12	I Don't Know How to Love Him
"Crazy Love"	1971	66	35	—	—	—	—	—	—	—	51	8	I Don't Know How to Love Him
"No Sad Song"	1971	—	51	—	—	29	—	—	—	—	62	32	Helen Reddy
"Summer of '71"	1972	—	—	—	—	—	16	—	—	—	—	—	Helen Reddy
"I Am Woman"	1972	2	1	—	—	—	—	—	—	—	1	2	I Am Woman
"Peaceful"	1973	36	12	—	—	—	—	—	—	—	12	2	I Am Woman
"Delta Dawn"	1973	1	1	—	—	—	1	13	—	—	1	1	Long Hard Climb
"Leave Me Alone (Ruby Red Dress)"	1973	1	5	—	—	—	4	—	—	—	3	1	Long Hard Climb
"Keep on Singing"	1974	22	10	—	—	—	17	—	—	—	15	1	Love Song for Jeffrey
"You and Me Against the World"	1974	55	9	—	—	—	—	—	—	—	9	1	Love Song for Jeffrey
"Angie Baby"	1974	13	3	5	—	—	7	—	—	5	1	1	Free and Easy
"Emotion"	1975	—	25	—	—	—	—	—	—	—	22	1	Free and Easy
"Free and Easy"	1975	82	—	—	—	—	1	—	—	—	—	—	Free and Easy
"Bluebird"	1975	100	51	—	—	—	40	—	—	—	35	5	No Way to Treat a Lady
"Ain't No Way to Treat a Lady"	1975	94	2	—	—	—	12	—	—	—	8	1	No Way to Treat a Lady
"Somewhere in the Night"	1975	—	27	—	—	—	27	—	—	—	19	2	No Way to Treat a Lady
"I Can't Hear You No More" b/w "Music Is My Life"	1976	— —	36	— —	— —	— —	— —	— —	— —	— —	29^{[A]}	1 —	Music, Music
"Gladiola"	1976	—	—	—	—	—	—	—	—	—	—	10	Music, Music
"You're My World"	1977	—	13	—	4^{[B]}	—	—	—	—	—	18	5	Ear Candy
"The Happy Girls"/ b/w "Laissez Les Bontemps Rouler"	1977	— —	65 —	— —	— —	— —	— —	— —	— —	— —	57 —	14 —	Ear Candy
"Candle on the Water"	1977	—	—	—	—	—	—	—	—	—	—	27	Pete's Dragon soundtrack
"We'll Sing in the Sunshine"	1978	—	—	—	—	—	—	—	—	—	—	12	We'll Sing in the Sunshine
"Ready or Not"	1978	—	70	—	—	—	—	—	—	—	73	28	We'll Sing in the Sunshine
"Make Love to Me"	1979	—	57	—	—	—	—	—	—	—	60	41	Reddy
"Let Me Be Your Woman"	1979	—	—	—	—	—	—	—	—	—	—	43	Reddy
"Take What You Find"	1980	—	—	—	—	—	—	—	—	—	—	—	Take What You Find
"I Can't Say Goodbye to You"	1981	—	—	16	—	—	—	—	—	43	88	42	Play Me Out
"Don't Tell Me Tonight"	1983	—	—	—	—	—	—	—	—	—	—	—	Imagination
"Imagination"	1983	—	—	—	—	—	—	—	—	—	—	—	Imagination
"Voices That Care" (as part of the collective Voices That Care)	1991	—	—	—	—	—	—	—	—	—	11	6	non-album single
"Surrender"	1998	—	—	—	—	—	—	—	—	—	—	—	Center Stage
"—" denotes a title that did not chart or was not released in that territory.

- ^{A} The B-side, "Music Is My Life", was eventually listed on the Hot 100 alongside "I Can't Hear You No More" as a "tag along" to indicate that some radio stations were opting to play the flip side of the original hit that charted.
- ^{B} On "You're My World" producer Kim Fowley's website is a note that the song "was number one (#1) in Mexico (Billboard) in 1977," but in the 17 nonconsecutive weekly appearances that the song made during its chart run on Billboard's "Hits of the World" list of the top 10 songs in Mexico in the issues dated between 15 October 1977, and 8 April 1978, the highest position that the song achieved was number four.

== Music videos ==
Title	Year	Director
"I Am Woman"	1972	unknown
"Angie Baby"	1974	John D. Wilson
"Imagination"	1983	Traci Wald Donat
"Voices That Care" (Various)	1991	David S. Jackson
