= All-Time Greatest Hits (Helen Reddy album) =

Compilation album by Helen Reddy
- Released: 1991
- Recorded: 1971–1977
- Length: 32:30
- Label: EMI-Capitol Special Markets
- Producers: Tom Catalano; Kim Fowley; Earle Mankey; Larry Marks; Jay Senter; Joe Wissert

Helen Reddy chronology
Feel So Young (1990)	All-Time Greatest Hits (1991)	The Best of Helen Reddy (1991)

Professional ratings
Review scores
Source	Rating
AllMusic	4/5 stars

All-Time Greatest Hits is a compilation album by Australian-American pop singer Helen Reddy that was released in 1991 by EMI-Capitol Special Markets and reissued by various labels with different covers on multiple occasions since.

== Reception ==
Stephen Thomas Erlewine of AllMusic writes, "All-Time Greatest Hits is a budget-priced, 10-track selection of Helen Reddy's best-known material from the '70s, and while there are some essential items missing [such as 'Keep On Singing', 'Emotion', and 'I Can't Hear You No More'], it still functions as a good, affordable sampler."

== Track listing ==
1. "I Don't Know How to Love Him" (Tim Rice, Andrew Lloyd Webber) – 3:15
2. "I Am Woman" (Ray Burton, Helen Reddy) – 3:24
3. "Peaceful" (Kenny Rankin) – 2:50
4. "Delta Dawn" (Larry Collins, Alex Harvey) – 3:08
5. "Leave Me Alone (Ruby Red Dress)" (Linda Laurie) – 3:26
6. "You and Me Against the World" (Kenny Ascher, Paul Williams) – 3:08
7. "Angie Baby" (Alan O'Day) – 3:29
8. "Ain't No Way to Treat a Lady" (Harriet Schock) – 3:26
9. "Somewhere in the Night" (Will Jennings, Richard Kerr) – 3:31
10. "You're My World" (Umberto Bindi, Gino Paoli, Carl Sigman) – 2:45

== Personnel ==
- Helen Reddy – vocals
- Tom Catalano – producer (except as noted)
- Larry Marks – producer ("I Don't Know How to Love Him")
- Jay Senter – producer ("I Am Woman")
- Joe Wissert – producer ("Angie Baby", "Ain't No Way to Treat a Lady", "Somewhere in the Night")
- Kim Fowley – producer ("You're My World")
- Earle Mankey – producer ("You're My World")
