= Helen Reddy's Greatest Hits =

Compilation album by Helen Reddy
- Released: 1975
- Length: 32:11
- Label: Capitol
- Producers: Tom Catalano; Larry Marks; Jay Senter; Joe Wissert

Helen Reddy chronology
No Way to Treat a Lady (1975)	Helen Reddy's Greatest Hits (1975)	Music, Music (1976)

Professional ratings
Review scores
Source	Rating
AllMusic	4/5 stars
Billboard	positive
Christgau's Record Guide	B−
Tom Hull – on the Web	B+

Helen Reddy's Greatest Hits is a compilation album by Australian-American pop singer Helen Reddy. It was released in 1975 by Capitol Records.

== Release and reception ==
On 5 December 1975, the Recording Industry Association of America awarded the album with Gold certification for sales of 500,000 copies in the United States, and both Platinum and Double Platinum certifications were issued on 5 February 1992. The album debuted on Billboard's Top LP's & Tapes chart in the issue dated the day following Gold certification, 6 December 1975, and made it to number five during its 51 weeks there. In Canada's RPM magazine it reached number 9, and on the album chart in the UK (where it was renamed The Best of Helen Reddy) it matched its number five US showing.

In 1987 an expanded edition that was given the title Helen Reddy's Greatest Hits (And More) was the first release of the original compilation on compact disc, and on 14 April 1997, that edition was reissued with the title Love Songs.

== Track listing ==
No.	Title	Writer(s)	Length
1.	"I Am Woman" (from I Am Woman, 1972)	Ray Burton; Helen Reddy	3:24
2.	"I Don't Know How to Love Him" (from I Don't Know How to Love Him, 1971)	Tim Rice; Andrew Lloyd Webber	3:15
3.	"Leave Me Alone (Ruby Red Dress)" (from Long Hard Climb, 1973)	Linda Laurie	3:26
4.	"Delta Dawn" (from Long Hard Climb)	Larry Collins; Alex Harvey	3:26
5.	"You and Me Against the World" (from Love Song for Jeffrey, 1974)	Kenneth Ascher; Paul Williams	3:08
6.	"Angie Baby" (from Free and Easy, 1974)	Alan O'Day	3:29
7.	"Emotion" (from Free and Easy)	Véronique Sanson; Patti Dahlstrom	2:52
8.	"Keep on Singing" (from Love Song for Jeffrey)	Bobby Hart; Danny Janssen	3:03
9.	"Peaceful" (from I Am Woman)	Kenny Rankin	2:50
10.	"Ain't No Way to Treat a Lady" (from No Way to Treat a Lady, 1975)	Harriet Schock	3:26

1987 re-release bonus tracks
No.	Title	Writer(s)	Length
1.	"Somewhere in the Night" (from No Way to Treat a Lady)	Will Jennings; Richard Kerr	3:31
2.	"I Can't Hear You No More" (from Music, Music, 1976)	Gerry Goffin; Carole King	2:48
3.	"You're My World" (from Ear Candy, 1977)	Umberto Bindi; Gino Paoli; Carl Sigman	2:45
4.	"The Happy Girls" (from Ear Candy)	Kim Fowley; Rick Henn; Earle Mankey; Reddy	4:00
5.	"Make Love to Me" (from Reddy, 1979)	Michael Tinsley; Steven Voice; Peter Yellowstone	3:49

== Personnel ==
- Helen Reddy – vocals
- Francesco Scavullo – photography
- Roy Kohara – art direction

LP release

- Tom Catalano – producer (except as noted)
- Larry Marks – producer ("I Don't Know How to Love Him")
- Jay Senter – producer ("I Am Woman")
- Joe Wissert – producer ("Angie Baby", "Emotion", "Ain't No Way to Treat a Lady")

CD bonus tracks

- Frank Day – producer ("Make Love to Me")
- Kim Fowley – producer ("You're My World", "The Happy Girls")
- Earle Mankey – producer ("You're My World", "The Happy Girls")
- Joe Wissert – producer ("Somewhere in the Night", "I Can't Hear You No More")

== Charts ==
=== Weekly charts ===
Chart (1975–1976)	Peak position
Australian Albums (Kent Music Report)	42
Canadian Albums (RPM)	9
New Zealand Albums (RMNZ)	1
UK Albums (Official Charts)	5
US Billboard 200	5

Chart (2020)	Peak position
Australian Albums (ARIA)	48

=== Year-end charts ===
Chart (1976)	Position
US Billboard 200	27

== Certifications ==
Region	Certification	Certified units/sales
Australia (ARIA)	Gold	20,000^{^}
Canada (Music Canada)	Platinum	100,000^{^}
Hong Kong (IFPI Hong Kong)	Gold	10,000^{*}
New Zealand (RMNZ)	Gold	7,500^{^}
United Kingdom (BPI)	Gold	100,000^{^}
United States (RIAA)	2× Platinum	2,000,000^{^}
^{*} Sales figures based on certification alone.^{^} Shipments figures based on certification alone.
