= I Am Woman: The Essential Helen Reddy Collection =

Compilation album by Helen Reddy
- Released: 1998
- Recorded: 1971–1981
- Length: 73:54
- Label: Razor & Tie
- Producers: Tom Catalano; Joel Diamond; Kim Fowley; Earle Mankey; Larry Marks; Lou Reizner; Jay Senter; Joe Wissert

Helen Reddy chronology
The Best of Helen Reddy (1991)	I Am Woman: The Essential Helen Reddy Collection (1998)	Center Stage (1998)

Professional ratings
Review scores
Source	Rating
AllMusic	4.5/5 stars

I Am Woman: The Essential Helen Reddy Collection is a compilation album by Australian-American pop singer Helen Reddy that was released in 1998 by Razor & Tie and, in addition to the title track, includes three additional songs written or cowritten by Reddy ("Best Friend", "More Than You Could Take", and "I Think I'll Write a Song") as well as rare compilation appearances by "Bluebird", "The Fool on the Hill", and two recordings from her brief time with MCA Records ("I Can't Say Goodbye to You" and "Never Say Goodbye").

== Reception ==
On AllMusic Charles Donovan asserts that this collection "is a compilation that lives up to its name -- everything anyone could need to know about Helen Reddy's heyday is included, and more. Dwelling largely on her years at Capitol, and concentrating almost exclusively on single releases, I Am Woman is a more comprehensive round-up than 1975's Greatest Hits."

== Track listing ==
1. "I Am Woman" (Ray Burton, Helen Reddy) – 3:24
2. "Best Friend" (Ray Burton, Helen Reddy) – 2:17
3. "I Don't Know How to Love Him" (Tim Rice, Andrew Lloyd Webber) – 3:15
4. "Crazy Love" (Van Morrison) – 3:16
5. "More Than You Could Take" (Helen Reddy) – 2:41
6. "Peaceful" (Kenny Rankin) – 2:50
7. "Delta Dawn" (Larry Collins, Alex Harvey) – 3:08
8. "Leave Me Alone (Ruby Red Dress)" (Linda Laurie) – 3:26
9. "Keep On Singing" (Bobby Hart, Danny Janssen) – 3:03
10. "The West Wind Circus" (Adam Miller) – 4:25
11. "You and Me Against the World" (Kenny Ascher, Paul Williams) – 3:08
12. "Angie Baby" (Alan O'Day) – 3:29
13. "I Think I'll Write a Song" (Peter Allen, Helen Reddy) – 2:22
14. "Emotion" (Patti Dahlstrom, Véronique Sanson) – 4:10
15. "Bluebird" (Leon Russell) – 2:46
16. "Somewhere in the Night" (Will Jennings, Richard Kerr) – 3:31
17. "Ain't No Way to Treat a Lady" (Harriet Schock) – 3:26
18. "I Can't Hear You No More" (Gerry Goffin, Carole King) – 2:48
19. "The Fool on the Hill" from All This and World War II (John Lennon, Paul McCartney) – 3:49
20. "You're My World" (Umberto Bindi, Gino Paoli, Carl Sigman) – 2:45
21. "Candle on the Water" from Pete's Dragon (Joel Hirschhorn, Al Kasha) – 3:10
22. "I Can't Say Goodbye to You" (Becky Hobbs) – 3:46
23. "Never Say Goodbye" from Continental Divide (Carole Bayer Sager, Michael Small) – 3:08

== Personnel ==
- Helen Reddy – vocals
- Tom Catalano – producer (except as noted)
- Joel Diamond – producer ("I Can't Say Goodbye to You", "Never Say Goodbye")
- Kim Fowley – producer ("You're My World")
- Earle Mankey – producer ("You're My World")
- Larry Marks – producer ("Best Friend", "Crazy Love", "I Don't Know How to Love Him", "More Than You Could Take")
- Jay Senter – producer ("I Am Woman")
- Joe Wissert – producer ("Angie Baby", "Emotion", "I Think I'll Write a Song", "Bluebird", "Ain't No Way to Treat a Lady", "Somewhere in the Night", "I Can't Hear You No More")
