= The Best of Helen Reddy =

Compilation album by Helen Reddy
- Released: 1991
- Recorded: 1971–1975
- Length: 63:11
- Label: EMI
- Producers: Tom Catalano; Larry Marks; Jay Senter; Joe Wissert

Helen Reddy chronology
All-Time Greatest Hits (1991)	The Best of Helen Reddy (1991)	I Am Woman: The Essential Helen Reddy Collection (1998)

Professional ratings
Review scores
Source	Rating
AllMusic	3/5 stars

The Best of Helen Reddy is a compilation album by Australian-American pop singer Helen Reddy that was released in 1991 by EMI and focuses exclusively on her first seven LPs. The 20 songs selected are evenly balanced between chart hits such as "I Am Woman", "Delta Dawn", and "Angie Baby", and lesser-known album tracks, including "Summer of '71" and "Tulsa Turnaround".

== Reception ==
AllMusic's Bruce Eder notes that this compilation, "has the virtue of a very low list price (especially as a 20-song disc) and good sound -- plus the presence of one song that Reddy isn't much known for doing, but which she did extremely well, 'How Can I Be Sure,' cut on her (largely ignored) very first LP."

== Track listing ==
1. "I Am Woman" (Ray Burton, Helen Reddy) – 3:24
2. "I Don't Know How to Love Him" (Tim Rice, Andrew Lloyd Webber) – 3:15
3. "You and Me Against the World" (Kenny Ascher, Paul Williams) – 3:08
4. "Emotion" (Patti Dahlstrom, Véronique Sanson) – 4:10
5. "Summer of '71" (Jack Conrad, Helen Reddy) – 2:36
6. "And I Love You So" (Don McLean) – 4:00
7. "Somewhere in the Night" (Will Jennings, Richard Kerr) – 3:31
8. "Tulsa Turnaround" (Larry Collins, Alex Harvey) – 3:24
9. "I Believe in Music" (Mac Davis) – 3:14
10. "Free and Easy" (Tom Jans) – 2:46
11. "Delta Dawn" (Larry Collins, Alex Harvey) – 3:08
12. "Angie Baby" (Alan O'Day) – 3:29
13. "Ain't No Way to Treat a Lady" (Harriet Schock) – 3:26
14. "How Can I Be Sure" (Eddie Brigati, Felix Cavaliere) – 2:50
15. "The Old Fashioned Way" (Georges Garvarentz, Joel Hirschhorn, Al Kasha) – 2:56
16. "Hit the Road Jack" (Percy Mayfield) – 2:18
17. "Leave Me Alone (Ruby Red Dress)" (Linda Laurie) – 3:26
18. "Keep On Singing" (Bobby Hart, Danny Janssen) – 3:03
19. "Peaceful" (Kenny Rankin) – 2:50
20. "Until It's Time for You to Go" (Buffy Sainte-Marie) – 2:17

== Personnel ==
- Helen Reddy – vocals
- Tom Catalano – producer (except as noted)
- Larry Marks – producer ("How Can I Be Sure", "I Believe in Music", "I Don't Know How to Love Him", "Summer of '71", "Tulsa Turnaround")
- Jay Senter – producer ("I Am Woman")
- Joe Wissert – producer ("Angie Baby", "Emotion", "Free and Easy", "Ain't No Way to Treat a Lady", "Somewhere in the Night")

== Charts ==
Chart (1984)	Peak position
Australian Albums (Kent Music Report)	29
