= Live in London (Helen Reddy album) =

Live album by Helen Reddy
- Released: December 1978
- Recorded: 11–13 May 1978
- Venues: London Palladium, London, England
- Length: 68:01
- Label: Capitol
- Producers: John Palladino; Helen Reddy

Helen Reddy chronology
| We'll Sing in the Sunshine (1978) | Live in London (1978) | Reddy (1979) |

Professional ratings
Review scores
| Source | Rating |
|---|---|
| AllMusic | 3/5 stars |
| Billboard | positive |

Live in London is the first live album by Australian-American pop singer Helen Reddy that was released in 1978 by Capitol Records and, as with her previous release, did not reach Billboard magazine's Top LP's & Tapes chart. On 25 June 2002, the album was released for the first time on compact disc.

== Background ==
Reddy had announced in the summer of 1977 that Kim Fowley, producer of her recent album release Ear Candy, would produce an upcoming live album for the singer: it was anticipated that the album would be a recording of Reddy's 8 November 1977 concert at Radio City Music Hall. However, Reddy herself—collaborating with John Palladino—would produce her live album, which was recorded at her three-night plus one matinée gig at the London Palladium in May 1978.

== Repertoire ==
Eight of Reddy's US Top 40 hits were performed at the Palladium in a penultimate twelve minute medley which also featured the top-40 shortfall "Crazy Love" and two songs featured on albums by Reddy: "I Believe in Music" and "The Last Blues Song". In 1978 only one of Reddy's singles had reached the UK singles chart – which until May 1978 was a top 50 ranking – "Angie Baby" having reached number 5 in the UK in 1975, and that song was performed in its entirety at the Palladium: throughout her performing career Reddy would habitually not truncate "Angie Baby" in concert due to its being a story song. (Two of Reddy's singles: "I am Woman" and "Leave Me Alone (Ruby Red Dress)", had almost reached the UK top 50 but were performed at the Palladium on in the medley.) Also performed in full at the Palladium: "You're My World", Reddy's most recent US top-40 hit (proving to be her last) which was a remake of a 1964 UK number-one hit (by Cilla Black); the Leon Russell composition "Bluebird", a 1975 US top-30 shortfall for Reddy, which the singer would apparently always enjoy performing live; and "I Can't Hear You No More", a lesser 1976 US hit for Reddy, which at the Palladium served as a frame for Reddy introducing her band members to the audience.

Featuring four additional songs from the singer's past albums: "This Masquerade", "The West Wind Circus", "I'll Be Your Audience" (which served as the concert finale) and "Hold Me in Your Dreams Tonight" (on which Reddy played piano) and also "Candle on the Water" from the 1977 film Pete's Dragon, Reddy's Palladium set-list also introduced five songs from her upcoming album release We'll Sing in the Sunshine: the title track, the disco track "Ready or Not" issued as UK single the month of the Palladium concert (May 1978), "Mama", "Poor Little Fool", and "Rhythm Rhapsody" – the last-named, which served as the concert's opening number, would in fact be cut from Reddy's We'll Sing in the Sunshine album. Live in London would include two songs never featured on an original studio album release by Reddy: besides "Rhythm Rhapsody", Reddy's Palladium set-list featured her (truncated) rendition of the Billy Joel number "The Entertainer".

The live recordings of "Mama" and "The West Wind Circus" became the respective A-side and B-side of a single from the album but had no showings on Billboard's pop or Easy Listening charts. Reddy commented on both songs in the liner notes of her singles compilation The Woman I Am: The Definitive Collection. Of the former she wrote, "Another great composition from Harriet Schock and one I sang every Mother's Day," and of the latter, "Although I was never in a circus, I have known families who were...Around the time I first heard this emotional work by Adam Miller, there was news of an aerialist in a well-known circus family falling to his death. This was a song I simply had to sing."

== Reception ==
AllMusic's Joe Viglione wrote retrospectively: "Producers John Palladino and Helen Reddy do a commendable job of capturing so many instruments and vocals and putting them into a wonderful mix. The album gets high marks for sound quality and performance...For the fans of Helen Reddy this is a treat and a very necessary part of her collection." In Billboard's review of the 2002 release of the album on compact disc, Mitchell Paoletta asks, "Ready for the flashback of a lifetime? If so, give a listen to Live in London, which has lost none of its sheen" and stresses that Reddy's "classy renderings of Billy Joel's 'The Entertainer' and Leon Russell's 'This Masquerade' should not be overlooked."

== Track listing ==
Side 1

1. "Rhythm Rhapsody" (Ralph Schuckett, John Siegler) – 3:43
2. "This Masquerade" (Leon Russell) – 3:49
3. "Bluebird" (Leon Russell) – 2:35
4. "Candle on the Water" from Pete's Dragon (Joel Hirschhorn, Al Kasha) – 3:10
5. "Hold Me in Your Dreams Tonight" (Marie Cain) – 2:46

Side 2

1. "Angie Baby" (Alan O'Day) – 3:29
2. "Poor Little Fool" (Jeff Lynne) – 4:40
3. "Ready or Not" (Amber DiLena, Jerry Keller) – 3:46
4. "The West Wind Circus" (Adam Miller) – 5:10

Side 3

1. "We'll Sing in the Sunshine" (Gale Garnett) – 3:37
2. "Mama" (Harriet Schock) – 4:31
3. "You're My World" (Umberto Bindi, Gino Paoli, Carl Sigman) – 2:27
4. "I Can't Hear You No More" (Gerry Goffin, Carole King) – 4:13
5. "The Entertainer" (Billy Joel) – 2:07

Side 4

1. Medley introduction – 1:25
2. Medley – 12:20
  a. "I Don't Know How to Love Him" (Tim Rice, Andrew Lloyd Webber)
  b. "I Believe in Music" (Mac Davis)
  c. "Crazy Love" (Van Morrison)
  d. "Peaceful" (Kenny Rankin)
  e. "You and Me Against the World" (Kenny Ascher, Paul Williams)
  f. "Delta Dawn" (Larry Collins, Alex Harvey)
  g. "Ain't No Way to Treat a Lady" (Harriet Schock)
  h. "Leave Me Alone (Ruby Red Dress)" (Linda Laurie)
  i. "The Last Blues Song" (Barry Mann, Cynthia Weil)
  j. "Keep On Singing" (Bobby Hart, Danny Janssen)
  k. "I Am Woman" (Ray Burton, Helen Reddy)
3. "I'll Be Your Audience" (Lewis Anderson, Becky Hobbs) – 4:05

== Personnel ==
- Guitar: Lenny Coltun, Richie Zito
- Bass: Dave Parlato
- Keyboards: Tom Hensley
- Drums: Ron Tutt
- Trumpet: Rick Baptist
- Backing vocals: Onike, Karin Patterson, Verna Richardson
- Accompaniment: The Gordon Rose Orchestra
