= Feel So Young =

Studio album by Helen Reddy
- Released: November 1990
- Recorded: August 1990
- Studios: Groove Masters Studio, Santa Monica, California
- Length: 34:30
- Labels: Helen Reddy, Inc.
- Producers: Dan Garcia; Milton Ruth

Helen Reddy chronology
Imagination (1983)	Feel So Young (1990)	All-Time Greatest Hits (1991)

Feel So Young is the fifteenth studio album by Australian-American pop singer Helen Reddy, released in 1990 by her own record label, Helen Reddy, Inc.. The album included new recordings of some of her hits ("Ain't No Way to Treat a Lady", "Angie Baby", "I Am Woman", and "You and Me Against the World") and two songs from her 1983 Imagination album ("Let's Go Up" and "Looks Like Love") as well as four new songs. It has been reissued by many other independent labels under various names and with varying track lists, some of which include some or all of three additional re-recordings of "Delta Dawn", "I Don't Know How to Love Him", and "Leave Me Alone (Ruby Red Dress)".

== Background ==
Since Helen Reddy's acrimonious divorce from American manager Jeffrey Wald in 1983 due to a custody battle with their son, she became her own manager and booking agent by forming her eponymous production company and record label, Helen Reddy Inc., at Santa Monica, California, to exert artistic and legal controls and "own the masters to these songs". The album Feel So Young was conceived as "a record of how they sounded now", in Reddy's words, which contains new recordings of previous hits. The album was recorded at Jackson Browne's Groove Masters Studio, Santa Monica, California in August 1990.

At the time of the initial release, the album was distributed primarily in the United States, Japan and England by Helen Reddy Records, Alfa Records and Pickwick Records, respectively, on CD and cassette tapes. In the United States, the album was released as a mail order in an "environmentally sensitive packaging", as stated in one of her advertisements.

=== Reissue history ===
Title	Country	Date	Label	Format	Catalogue number
Feel So Young: The Best of Helen Reddy	United Kingdom	8 March 2002	Prestige Elite Records	CD	CDSGP 0124
Greatest and Latest	United States	5 November 2002	Goldenlane Records/Cleopatra Records	CD	1261
The Best of Helen Reddy	Australia	12 November 2002	Masters / Intercontinental Records	CD	1267
Angie Baby	United Kingdom	14 November 2002	Delta Music	CD	CD 4153
The Collection	Australia	20 December 2002	Performax	CD	MAX081
I Am a Woman	United Kingdom and Germany	9 September 2003	Brilliant	CD	BT 33088
Classics	United States and Canada	20 September 2003	Madacy Records	CD	4483
Helen Reddy	The Netherlands	6 December 2004	United Audio Entertainment	CD	615
Greatest Hits	United States	6 September 2005	Delta Distribution/Laserlight	CD	32612
Helen Reddy	United States	6 December 2007	KRB	CD	KRB8165-2

== Reception ==
Critic Al Campbell of AllMusic wrote retrospectively: "While a few of the remakes are adequate, the majority are not in the same league as the originals." He also advises, "Other compilations are available containing the definitive versions of these hits so don't waste your money on this set."

== Track listing ==
1. "Feel So Young" (Mack Gordon, Josef Myrow) – 3:03
2. "Ain't No Way to Treat a Lady" (Harriet Schock) – 4:01
3. "Let's Go Up" (Franne Golde, Peter Ivers) – 4:14
4. "Angie Baby" (Alan O'Day) – 4:00
5. "Here in My Arms"(Mary Ekler) – 4:42
6. "Looks Like Love" (Keith Stegall) – 2:55
7. "You and Me Against the World" (Kenny Ascher, Paul Williams) – 3:55
8. "Lost in the Shuffle" (Gary Rue) – 3:11
9. "I Am Woman" (Ray Burton, Helen Reddy) – 2:57
10. "That's All" (Alan Brandt, Bob Haymes) – 4:27

Reissue bonus tracks

1. "Leave Me Alone (Ruby Red Dress)" (Linda Laurie) – 3:26
2. "I Don't Know How to Love Him" (Tim Rice, Andrew Lloyd Webber) – 3:15
3. "Delta Dawn" (Larry Collins, Alex Harvey) – 3:08

== Personnel ==
Musicians

- Helen Reddy – vocals
- Milton Ruth – drums
- Wally Minko – piano
- Bill Breland – bass; background vocals
- Teresa Russell – guitar; background vocals
- Doug Norwine – alto and tenor sax
- Rick Baptist – flugelhorn and trumpet
- Jessica Williams – solo background vocalist

Production

- Helen Reddy – executive producer
- Milton Ruth – producer
- Dan Garcia – producer; recording engineer; mixing engineer
- Paul Dieter – assistant engineer
