= Ear Candy (Helen Reddy album) =

Studio album by Helen Reddy
- Released: 25 April 1977
- Recorded: February 1977
- Studios: Brother Studios, Santa Monica
- Length: 34:30
- Label: Capitol
- Producers: Kim Fowley, Earle Mankey

Helen Reddy chronology
Music, Music (1976)	Ear Candy (1977)	We'll Sing in the Sunshine (1978)

Professional ratings
Review scores
Source	Rating
AllMusic	3/5 stars

Ear Candy is the ninth studio album by Australian-American pop singer Helen Reddy, released on 25 April 1977 by Capitol Records. The album included a modern take on the doo-wop genre ("Long Distance Love"), a Cajun number that gave the Melbourne native her first and only appearance on Billboard magazine's Country chart ("Laissez les Bontemps Rouler"), and a dark self-parody on which Reddy proclaims: "I don't take no shit from nobody" ("Baby, I'm a Star"). Unusually, half of the songs recorded for Ear Candy were co-written by Reddy herself, including the second single, "The Happy Girls", Reddy's first self-penned A-side single since "I am Woman". The album's first single, a remake of the 1964 Cilla Black hit "You're My World", gave Reddy a final top 40 hit.

== Recording and release history ==
Ear Candy debuted on the Billboard 200 album chart in the 21 May 1977 issue of Billboard. It was on the chart for nineteen weeks; it stalled at number 75. RPM, the music trade magazine for Canada, would afford Ear Candy an album chart peak of number 84. Although Reddy would have five more studio albums released – and also the 1978 Live in London concert album - before retiring as a career recording artist after her 1983 album release Imagination Ear Candy would afford Reddy her final charting album in Billboard. Reddy would be afforded one more charting album in Canada: Reddy (number 97).

Ear Candy was recorded at Brother Studios (Santa Monica, California) in early February 1977 with production by Kim Fowley, assisted by Earle Mankey. Although Reddy's precedent 1976 album Music, Music had been certified Gold its second single release "Gladiola" had been Reddy's first Billboard Hot 100 shortfall since her 1971 Hot 100 debut with "I Don't Know How to Love Him" (of Reddy's fifteen 1971-76 Hot 100 entries all but two had reached the Top 20 affording her ten Top 20 hits). Jeff Wald, then Reddy's husband and manager, would state in 1977: "Helen has enough hits to be established in the public mind...but it still shakes you when you're suddenly not on the charts". Wald therefore had not wanted Reddy's ninth studio album to be (quote) "just another Helen Reddy album[:] I let it be known on the street that whoever came to me with the right material, with a hit song, was going to produce Helen Reddy"..."I wanted hit singles and something a little different" ..."I called every publisher in town: listened to 800-900 songs"..."I let a dozen producers walk into this office and play me a song. I called Kim Fowley"- "I've always thought he was bright"- "and let him know I would like to hear from him, what his ideas were"; "Of the several producers who played me stuff he was the best prepared...He played me five songs, four of which I liked immediately".

Wald further said of Fowley: "He doesn't read a note of music, he doesn't work a dial in that studio, but he's a catalyst. He worked completely opposite from any way we've [previously] worked [on Reddy's albums] we've always picked the ten songs before we've gone into the studio, worked on all ten of them [til they're] down perfect and then recorded them. But it wound up on ['Ear Candy'] that five of the songs were written in the studio. Helen has always had a writer's block but this time she wrote or co-wrote five songs. Kim loosened her up in the studio and he let her take chances."

Fowley, then known primarily for his involvement in the Los Angeles proto-punk scene, would explain his surprising assignment of producing Helen Reddy - cited by Fowley (quoting Alice Cooper) as "the queen of housewife rock" - thus: "Jeff [Wald] wanted us to get together and I simply wanted to have fun", with Fowley likening his producing a Helen Reddy album to "Bloody Sam" Peckinpah directing a movie starring Julie Andrews. However Fowley also stated "I see Helen Reddy as the great American voice. [Her voice] is easily accepted and digested by large groups of people. I'm not trying to compromise her position but extend it in the same way Simon & Garfunkel went from the 'Sounds of Silence'to 'Mrs Robinson'. It was still Simon & Garfunkel but in a different perspective."

Reddy began promotion of her upcoming album with a performance of the track "One More Night" on The Tonight Show episode broadcast 21 February 1977, with an unspecified advance single release anticipated within the upcoming two weeks; however the track "You're My World" was not issued as a single until 4 April 1977. Reddy would reminisce about the song "You're My World": "I used to sing along with Cilla Black on the radio when they played this song back in the early 1960s. When it was suggested [in 1977] as a track for me to record, I leapt like a trout to the fly." The Ear Candy album itself was released on 25 April 1977, with its 21 May 1977 Hot 100 debut closely followed by Reddy's performing four songs featured on the album - "Aquarius Miracle", "The Happy Girls", "Midnight Skies" and "You're My World" - on the 6 May 1977 broadcast of The Midnight Special.

"You're My World" debuted on the Billboard Easy Listening Top 50 dated 16 April 1977, to reach a number 5 peak within a 21-week chart tenure "You're My World" would return Reddy to the Billboard Hot 100 as of the chart dated 30 April 1977 with a Top 40 comeback effected on the Hot 100 dated 11 June 1977; the single would peak at number 18 on Hot 100 charts dated 23-&-30 July 1977 with an overall Top 40 tenure of 12 weeks while an overall Hot 100 tenure of 22 weeks would tie "You're My World" with Reddy's signature number 1 hit "I am Woman" as Reddy's longest-lasting Hot 100 entry.

"You're My World" also reached number 13 on the Canadian pop chart. The potential for further international success for Reddy's version of "You're My World" was narrowed by the concurrent release of a remake by UK pop group Guys 'n' Dolls which was a number 1 hit in the Netherlands and Flemish Belgium. Although the Guys 'n' Dolls version was unsuccessful in the British Isles, its release there did cause Capitol UK to make Ear Candy's lead single the track "Long Distance Love" with "You're My World" as B-side, while in the Netherlands Reddy's co-write "Midnight Skies" was the choice for single (with "Long Distance Love" as B-side) with neither local release affording Reddy any success. In Reddy's native Australia a remake of "You're My World" had been a number 1 hit in January 1975 for Daryl Braithwaite factoring into the Australian release of Reddy's version being unsuccessful.

The second single from Ear Candy, the Reddy co-write "The Happy Girls", began a seven-week Hot 100 tenure with 8 October 1977 chart with an eventual peak of number 57, the 8 October 1977 issue of Billboard also inaugurated the eleven-week Easy Listening chart tenure of "The Happy Girls", the Easy Listening peak of which was number 14. The single's B-side, "Laissez les Bontemps Rouler", afforded Reddy a unique Hot Country Songs chart appearance with a one-week tenure at number 98 reported in the 22 October 1977 issue of Billboard. In November 1977, "The Happy Girls" reached number 65 on the Canadian pop chart.

Cash Box magazine afforded "You're My World" a number 16 chart peak in Top 100 singles chart dated 6 August 1977 and afforded the track a six-week Top 20 tenure, as opposed to the three weeks over which the track ranked in the Billboard Hot 100. Conversely "The Happy Girls" fared less well on the Cash Box singles chart than in Billboard, the Cash Box peak for "The Happy Girls" being number 75 with a four-week tenure.

Reddy had announced in the summer of 1977 that she intended to record her next studio album with Fowley as producer and also that Fowley would helm a Helen Reddy live album, with the latter tentatively announced as a recording of Reddy's 8 November 1977 concert at Radio City Music Hall. However the production duties on Reddy's tenth studio album, the 1978 release We'll Sing in the Sunshine, were split between Fowley (helming six tracks) and veteran easy listening producer Nick De Caro (helming four). Although De Caro had not previously produced Reddy, he had been arranger and conductor on Reddy's 1971 breakout hit "I Don't Know How to Love Him", on her 1975 number 1 hit "Angie Baby", and also her final hit to reach the Top Ten of the Billboard Hot 100, "Ain't No Way to Treat a Lady" (1975). De Caro had also been arranger/ conductor on Reddy's lesser hits "Bluebird" (1975), "Somewhere in the Night" (1975) and "I Can't Hear You No More" (1976). Also Reddy's concert album would be the Live in London - recorded at the London Palladium in May 1978 - with production by Reddy herself collaborating with John Palladino.

On 23 February 2010, Ear Candy was released for the first time on compact disc as one of two albums on one CD, the other album being Reddy's tenth studio album release: We'll Sing in the Sunshine (1978).

== Track listing ==
Side 1

1. "You're My World" (Umberto Bindi, Gino Paoli, Carl Sigman) – 2:41
2. "One More Night" (Stephen Bishop) – 3:32
3. "Long Distance Love" (Becky Hobbs) – 2:56
4. "If It's Magic" (Stevie Wonder) – 3:50
5. "Aquarius Miracle" (Kim Fowley, Toni Lamond, Helen Reddy) – 2:36

Side 2

1. "Laissez les Bontemps Rouler" (Julie Didier, Casey Kelly) – 2:28
2. "The Happy Girls" (Kim Fowley, Rick Henn, Earle Mankey, Helen Reddy) – 5:02
3. "Midnight Skies" (Kim Fowley, Rick Henn, Helen Reddy) – 3:32
4. "Baby, I'm a Star" (Kim Fowley, Rick Henn, Earle Mankey, Helen Reddy) – 4:03
5. "Thank You" (Kim Fowley, Rick Henn, Earle Mankey, Helen Reddy) – 4:00

== Personnel ==
- Guitar: Richard Bennett, Dennis Budimir, Chris Darrow, John Etheridge, Mitch Holder, Bernie Leadon,
  John Perez, Frank Reckard, Doug Rohen
- Bass guitar: Chris Darrow, Jim Hughart, Mike Porcaro
- Keyboards: David Carr, Alan Lindgren, Mike Melvoin
- Drums: Hal Blaine, Rick Henn, Jeff Porcaro
- Percussion: Emil Richards
- Saxophone: Bob Henderson
- Woodwinds: Gene Cipriano
- Horns: Arthur Amabe, Dave Duke, Gary Grant, Dick Hyde, Bobby Shew, Ernie Tack, Bill Watrous
- Strings: Dorothy Ashby, Alfred Barr, Arthur Brown, Denyse Buffum, Stella Castellucci, Ronald Cooper,
  Richard Dickler, Assa Drori, Winterton Garvey, Nathan Gershman, Harris Goldman, John Hornschuch,
  Dennis Karmazyn, Louis Kievman, Leonard Malarsky, Gordon Marron, Alex Neiman, Paul Polivnick,
  Jerome Reisler, Dale Rollice, Henry Roth, Sheldon Sanov, Jack Shulman, Marshall Sosson,
  Gloria Strassner, Robert Sushel, Charles Veal, Dorothy Wade, John Wittenberg
- Backing vocals: Curt Boettcher, Joe Chemay, Laura Creamer, Pat Henderson, John Joyce,
  Myrna Matthews, Brent Nelson, Stacey O'Brien, Stacey O'Brien, Nigel Olsson

== Charts ==
Chart (1977)	Peak position
Canadian Albums (RPM)	84
US Billboard 200	75
