= No Way to Treat a Lady =

No Way to Treat a Lady may refer to:

- No Way to Treat a Lady (novel), a 1964 novel by William Goldman
  - No Way to Treat a Lady (film), a 1968 film adaptation of the novel, starring Rod Steiger
  - No Way to Treat a Lady (musical), a 1987 American musical by Douglas J. Cohen
- No Way to Treat a Lady (album), a 1975 album by Helen Reddy

== See also ==
- "Ain't No Way to Treat a Lady", a 1974 song by Harriet Schock, covered by Helen Reddy
