= David Castle (musician) =

- David Castle in his home recording studio

Background information
- Born: David Dean Castle; November 28, 1952; Overton, Texas, U.S.
- Died: May 8, 2019 (aged 66) Los Angeles, California, U.S.
- Genres: Pop rock; adult contemporary; soft rock
- Occupations: Singer-songwriter, musician, producer, composer
- Instruments: Vocals; keyboards; organ; piano
- Years active: 1977–2019
- Label: Parachute Records
- Website: DavidCastle.net (dead link)

David Dean Castle (November 28, 1952 – May 8, 2019) was an American singer-songwriter and film and television composer. His goal was to "combine classical music values with pop's energy."

== Early years ==
Castle was born in Overton, Texas, United States. Castle is the younger of two sons of a minister and a schoolteacher. His schoolteacher mother played piano, and began teaching Castle the piano at an early age. He moved to Hollywood, California in his early 20s, and became a staff writer for United Artists Music Publishing. His first credit was songwriter of "Ten to Eight" from Helen Reddy's 1975 album, No Way to Treat a Lady, which was also used as the B-side to her "Somewhere in the Night" 7-inch single. His first A-side was "If You Feel the Way I Do" (co-written with Graham Dee), the lead track on the Lettermen's 1975 album, The Time Is Right.

He contributed to the ABC-TV miniseries Rich Man, Poor Man and participated in the "Great Golden Hits of the Monkees" tour in 1976.

== Castle in the Sky ==
The following year, Castle became the first artist signed to Parachute Records, a new subsidiary of Casablanca Records headed by record mogul, Russ Regan. His debut album, Castle in the Sky was the label's first release in August 1977, and a rerecording of "Ten to Eight" b/w "Finally" was the label's first single. It spent seven weeks on the Billboard Hot 100 chart, peaking at number 68. He performed "Ten to Eight" on the BBC music chart television program Top of the Pops on February 9, 1978. The follow-up single, "The Loneliest Man on the Moon" b/w "Pretending", peaked at number 89 in early 1978. Follow-up singles, "All I Ever Wanna Be Is Yours" b/w "With Love & with Care" and "You're Too Far Away" b/w "Pretending" failed to chart.

== "Istanbul Blues" ==
In 1978, he contributed a track called "Istanbul Blues" to Oliver Stone's Midnight Express. In the film, Randy Quaid & John Hurt sing "Istanbul Blues," but on the soundtrack album, Castle performs it. Midnight Express (Music from the Original Motion Picture Soundtrack) was composed by Giorgio Moroder, and won the Golden Globe Awards and the Academy Award for Best Original Score in 1979. It was also up for a Grammy Award for Best Score Soundtrack for Visual Media, but lost to Close Encounters of the Third Kind. "Istanbul Blues" was the lead track on side two of the LP, and was used as the B-side to Moroder's "Chase" single.

== Love You Forever ==
His second album, Love You Forever was released in September 1979. Love You Forever featured Castle's signature style of layered vocals, and had more of a rock and roll feel than Castle in the Sky, but suffered from poor timing, as it was released just as Parachute Records was folding. Castle and songwriting colleague Jack Keller produced the album. The album's lone single, "Hold Me Just a Little Bit Longer" (two different versions, b/w "I'll Always Be There When You Need Me" and "No Matter What"), failed to chart. A promo of "At One with the Universe and You" was also released to radio stations.

Also in 1979, he appeared in the motion picture Where the Buffalo Roam, starring Bill Murray and Peter Boyle. He was credited as the "Longhair Kid" (one of the featured "hippies").

== 1980s ==
Shortly after the release of Love You Forever, Parachute Records dissolved. Castle set up a recording studio in his home and focused more on composing and orchestrating music for commercials, television, and film. He scored music for the following: Vicki!, The Jenny Jones Show, the HBO Rodney Dangerfield special Opening Night at Rodney's Place, the Hallmark Hall of Fame special Home Fires Burning (January 29, 1989), Chuck Workman's The Beats, the Star Trek: The Original Series video episode "The City on the Edge of Forever", a California Army National Guard promotional film entitled California the Beautiful, and an LAPD drunk-driving spot entitled It Could Happen (starring Teri Garr). He also served as music supervisor on The Whoopi Goldberg Show.

== Late career ==
He independently release his third album, Voice in the Wind, in 1994. While working as an executive at Sony Pictures Television, Castle began working on a project entitled "Conversations", that evolved into his fourth album, Music for Your Soul (released on May 16, 2006).

On June 5, 2012, he released the single "I See the Clouds Go By", which was dedicated to recently deceased Monkee Davy Jones. On July 15, 2012, his song, "Conversations", appeared in the season five premiere of Breaking Bad. His final single was "Christmas Every Day," released in time for Christmas 2015.

== Private life ==
He married his third wife, Ann Karen Castle, on November 11, 2011. After a long battle with cancer, Castle died on May 8, 2019, in Los Angeles, California, shortly after being moved into hospice care. He had no children, but left behind a widow, a step-son, and two step grandchildren.
