= I Am Woman (disambiguation) =

"I Am Woman" is a 1972 single by Helen Reddy.

I Am Woman may also refer to:

- I Am Woman (album), Reddy's 1972 album of the same name
- I Am Woman (film), a 2019 biopic about Helen Reddy
- "I Am Woman" (Barbra Streisand song), 1964
- "I Am Woman" (Jordin Sparks song), 2011
- "I Am Woman" (Emmy Meli song), 2021
- I Am Woman, a 1988 book by Indigenous feminist author Lee Maracle

== See also ==
- I Am Woman awards, a platform created by the Karan Gupta Education Foundation and IE Business School which celebrates and awards the inspiration of women
- I Am Woman: The Essential Helen Reddy Collection, a 1998 compilation album by Helen Reddy
- "I Am Not a Woman, I'm a God", a 2021 song by Halsey
- "I'm a Woman" (song), a 1962 song by Peggy Lee
