= No Way to Treat a Lady (album) =

Studio album by Helen Reddy
- Released: June 1975
- Recorded: 1975
- Length: 31:04
- Label: Capitol
- Producer: Joe Wissert

Helen Reddy chronology
Free and Easy (1974)	No Way to Treat a Lady (1975)	Helen Reddy's Greatest Hits (1975)

Singles from No Way to Treat a Lady
- 1. "Bluebird" Released: June 1975; 2. "Ain't No Way to Treat a Lady" Released: July 1975; 3. "Somewhere in the Night" Released: 17 November 1975

Professional ratings
Review scores
Source	Rating
AllMusic	3/5 stars

No Way to Treat a Lady is the seventh studio album by Australian-American pop singer Helen Reddy that was released in June 1975 by Capitol Records and found Reddy tackling country pop ("You Don't Need a Reason"), bossa nova ("Ten to Eight") and blues ("Long Time Looking"). The album debuted on Billboard's Top LP's & Tapes chart in the issue dated 12 July 1975, and peaked at number 11 over the course of 34 weeks, and on the album chart in Canada's RPM magazine it got as high as number 13. On 19 January 1976, the Recording Industry Association of America awarded the album with Gold certification for sales of 500,000 copies in the United States, and on 23 August 2005, it was released for the first time on compact disc as one of two albums on one CD, the other album being her 1976 release, Music, Music.

== Singles ==
The advance single from the album issued in June 1975 paired the tracks "You Don't Need a Reason" and "Bluebird", the former – written by Alex Harvey who had penned Reddy's number 1 hit "Delta Dawn" – being the intended A-side. However a week after the single's release Capitol Records with Reddy's husband/manager Jeff Wald issued a statement announcing that "Bluebird" – a Leon Russell composition – would be promoted as the A-side. "Bluebird" would debut on the Billboard's Hot 100 dated 5 July, with a parallel debut on the magazine's Easy Listening Top 40, only to become the least successful lead single from a Reddy album since "No Sad Song" from her second album Helen Reddy peaked at number 62 in 1972. Capitol Records evidently had misgivings about both sides of the advance single from No Way to Treat a Lady, as parallel with the album's June 1975 release the track "Ain't No Way to Treat a Lady" was rush released as a single, with "Bluebird" resultantly stalling at number 35 on the Hot 100 to drop off that chart after only six weeks. "Bluebird" did manage to rise as high as number 5 in the top ten on the Billboard Easy Listening Top 40 in an eight-week chart tenure, and was also a minor hit in both Canada (number 51) and New Zealand (number 40). Despite its statistically low profile in her repertoire, "Bluebird" would be spoken of fondly by Reddy: "I love Leon Russell's writing and I love this song. It was an integral part of my repertoire for nearly 30 years, and I never tired of singing it."

The second single "Ain't No Way to Treat a Lady" – which was "written by the talented Harriet Schock, a fine singer in her own right, [and] really struck a nerve with many listeners" – debuted on the Billboard Hot 100 dated 9 August 1975, rising as high as number 8 in its 16 week chart tenure. After debuting on the Easy Listening Top 40 dated 23 August, "Ain't No Way..." would become the seventh of Reddy's eight number 1 Easy Listening hits, with a chart tenure of 11 weeks. On the Canadian hit parade as ranked by RPM, "Ain't No Way..." rose as high as number 2, making it Reddy's highest-charting Canadian hit after "I am Woman" and "Delta Dawn", both of which reached the number 1 position on the RPM chart (from which "Ain't No Way..." was kept first by "Third Rate Romance" by the Amazing Rhythm Aces and then by "I'm Sorry" by John Denver). "Ain't No Way..." was also a hit (number 12) in New Zealand and became Reddy's final chart item in her native Australia at number 94. The song also earned Reddy her final Grammy nomination, in the category of Best Pop Vocal Performance, Female (the category would be won by Janis Ian for "At Seventeen").

No Way to Treat a Lady became Reddy's first album to yield a third single release when "Somewhere in the Night" was issued on 17 November 1975, to debut 29 November on the Easy Listening Top 40, where its tenure was 14-weeks with a number 2 peak. Debuting on the Hot 100 of 6 December, "Somewhere in the Night" would peak at number 19 in a 14-week tenure. No Way to Treat a Lady would be Reddy's last album to yield more than one top-40 hit. In Canada "Somewhere in the Night" charted with a number 27 peak. "Barry Manilow also recorded this song but graciously conceded that he thought my version was better," said Reddy. "I don't think it possible for anyone to make a bad recording of such a great tune."

== Track listing ==
Side 1
No.	Title	Writer	Length
1.	"Ain't No Way to Treat a Lady"	Harriet Schock	3:26
2.	"Bluebird"	Leon Russell	2:46
3.	"Don't Let It Mess Your Mind"	Phil Cody, Neil Sedaka	2:42
4.	"Somewhere in the Night"	Will Jennings, Richard Kerr	3:31
5.	"You Don't Need a Reason"	Alex Harvey	2:59

Side 2
No.	Title	Writer	Length
6.	"Ten to Eight"	David Castle	3:39
7.	"Birthday Song"	Don McLean	3:16
8.	"You Know Me"	Kenny Ascher, Paul Williams	2:44
9.	"Nothing Good Comes Easy"	Barry Mann, Cynthia Weil	3:15
10.	"Long Time Looking"	Peter Allen, Carole Bayer Sager	2:46
Total length:			31:04

== Personnel ==
- Helen Reddy – vocals
- Joe Wissert – producer
- Nick DeCaro – arranger and conductor
- Tom Perry – recording engineer
- Doug Sax – mastering engineer
- Mike Reese – mastering engineer
- Francesco Scavullo – photography
- Roy Kohara – art direction

== Charts ==
Chart (1975)	Peak position
Australian Albums (Kent Music Report)	65
Canadian Albums (RPM)	13
New Zealand Albums (RMNZ)	13
US Billboard 200	11
