= Music, Music =

Studio album by Helen Reddy
- Released: 8 July 1976
- Recorded: February – March 1976
- Length: 30:04
- Label: Capitol
- Producer: Joe Wissert

Helen Reddy chronology
Helen Reddy's Greatest Hits (1975)	Music, Music (1976)	Ear Candy (1977)

Professional ratings
Review scores
Source	Rating
Allmusic	3/5 stars

Music, Music is the eighth studio album by Australian-American pop singer Helen Reddy that was released in July 1976 by Capitol Records and later described by J. Scott McClintock for AllMusic: "There are breezy, Bacharach-ian excursions ('Gladiola,' 'You Make It So Easy'), bluesy numbers ('Get Off Me Baby,' 'Ladychain'), light country ('Mama'), jazzy ballads (Paul Williams' torchy contribution, 'Nice to Be Around'), and even a little Philly soul ('I Can't Hear You No More')." On 2 August 1976, the Recording Industry Association of America awarded the album with Gold certification for sales of 500,000 copies in the United States.

It debuted on Billboard's Top LP's & Tapes chart that same month, in the issue dated 14 August, and got as high as number 16. It stopped at number 36 in Cash Box magazine and number 30 in Record World, but made it to number 14 in Canada's RPM magazine. The third album recorded by Reddy with producer Joe Wissert, Music, Music was cited in 1977 by Reddy as a personal favourite from among her albums. On 23 August 2005, Music, Music was released for the first time on compact disc as one of two Helen Reddy albums on one CD, the other album being her 1975 studio release, No Way to Treat a Lady.

== Singles ==
"I Can't Hear You No More" was released in the United States on 26 July 1976, and debuted on Billboard's Hot 100 in the issue of the magazine dated 7 August, eventually making it to number 29 over the course of nine weeks. In the following issue, dated 14 August, it made its first appearance on the magazine's Easy Listening chart, where it spent 11 weeks, one of which was at number one. In RPM magazine the song got as high as number 36 pop.

In Billboard's 28 August issue the single's B-side, "Music Is My Life", started to be listed on the Hot 100 alongside "I Can't Hear You No More" as a "tag along" to indicate that some radio stations were opting to play the flip side of the original hit that charted. While "Music Is My Life" did not have any showings on the list of Easy Listening hits, a third song from the album, "Gladiola", began a 12-week chart run there in the issue dated 13 November of that year that included a number 10 peak position but saw no activity on the pop chart.

== Track listing ==
Side 1

1. "Music, Music" (Pamela Polland) – 3:14
  - Jeff Porcaro – drums
  - David Hungate – bass guitar
  - Fred Tackett – guitar
  - David Paich – piano
  - Bobbye Hall – congas
2. "Gladiola" (Alan Gordon) – 3:27
  - Harvey Mason – drums
  - Reini Press – bass guitar
  - Dean Parks – guitar
  - Mark Jordan – piano
  - Victor Feldman – percussions
  - Tom Scott – alto sax solo
3. "Mama" (Harriet Schock) – 4:03
  - Harvey Mason – drums
  - Scotty Edwards – bass guitar
  - Ray Parker Jr. – guitar
  - Clarence McDonald – piano
4. "Hold Me in Your Dreams Tonight" (Marie Cain) – 2:42
  - Harvey Mason – drums
  - Reini Press – bass guitar
  - Dean Parks – guitar
  - Mark Jordan – piano
  - Victor Feldman – percussions
5. "Get Off Me Baby" (Jeff Langley, Holly Near) – 4:58
  - Harvey Mason – drums
  - Scotty Edwards – bass guitar
  - Ray Parker Jr. – guitar
  - Clarence McDonald – piano

Side 2

1. "I Can't Hear You No More" (Gerry Goffin, Carole King) – 2:49
  - Harvey Mason – drums
  - Dean Parks – guitar
  - Scotty Edwards – bass guitar
  - Larry Muhoberac – piano
2. "Ladychain" (Marcia Waldorf) – 3:58
  - Harvey Mason – drums
  - Scotty Edwards – bass guitar
  - Ray Parker Jr. – guitar
  - Clarence McDonald – piano
  - Tom Scott – alto sax solo
3. "Music Is My Life" (Alan Gordon) – 2:29
  - Jeff Porcaro – drums
  - David Hungate – bass guitar
  - Fred Tackett – guitar
  - David Paich – piano
  - Victor Feldman – percussions
4. "Nice to Be Around" (John Williams, Paul Williams) – 2:58
  - Harvey Mason – drums
  - Reini Press – bass guitar
  - Dean Parks – guitar
  - Mark Jordan – piano
  - Tom Scott – alto flute solo
5. "You Make It So Easy" (Helen Reddy, Carole Bayer Sager) – 2:23
  - Harvey Mason – drums
  - Dean Parks – guitar
  - Scotty Edwards – bass guitar
  - Larry Muhoberac – piano

== Personnel ==
- Helen Reddy – vocals
- Joe Wissert – producer
- Nick DeCaro – arranger and conductor
- Tom Perry – recording engineer
- Mike Reese – mastering engineer
- Francesco Scavullo – photography
- Roy Kohara – art direction

Additional musicians

- Gary Grant – trumpet
- Chuck Findley – trumpet
- Bob Findley – trumpet
- Steve Madiao – trumpet
- Jay Daversa – trumpet
- Don Menza – saxophone
- Tom Scott – saxophone
- Bill Perkins – saxophone
- Jay Migliori – saxophone
- Jack Nimitz – saxophone
- Dick "Slyde" Hyde – trombone
- Lou McCreary – trombone
- Earl Dumler – oboe
- Harry Bluestone – string concertmaster
- Carolyn Willis – background vocals
- Jim Gilstrap – background vocals
- Myrna Matthews – background vocals
- Oren Waters – background vocals
- Lisa Roberts – background vocals
- Nick DeCaro – background vocals
- Frank DeCaro – contractor

== Charts ==
Chart (1976)	Peak position
Canadian Albums (RPM)	14
US Billboard 200	16
