= Snuff (American band) =

American country rock band

Snuff were an American country rock band based in Southern Virginia and active during the 1970s and early 1980s. They released a pair of albums and scored a minor hit on the US pop chart with "Bad, Bad Billy" in 1983. The band disbanded due to being unable to find success after "Bad, Bad Billy".

== Career ==
Snuff initially formed in the 1970s and began as an acoustic trio featuring guitarist James Gray "Jimbo" Bowling, guitarist Bill Wampler, and vocalist Mike Jones. However, the group gradually incorporated more of an electric sound into their repertoire, and by the 1980s, they had evolved into a six-member outfit, including Bowling, guitarist Robbie House, lead vocalist/acoustic guitarist Chuck "Coyote" Larson, bassist C. Scott Trabue, violinist Cecil Hooker, and drummer/percussionist Michael A. Johnson.

The group released their eponymous debut album in 1982. Featuring a country sound infused with elements of rock, Snuff featured a minor country hit, "(So This is) Happy Hour", which peaked at number 71 on the Country music charts.

The following year, the band released their follow-up album, an EP titled NightFighter. This release featured six tracks, including what would become the band's biggest hit, "Bad, Bad Billy". This song would be the group's only ever song to crack the Billboard Hot 100, peaking as high as No. 88 in August 1983. Penned by House, Larson, and Bowling, "Bad, Bad Billy" was also the only original tune on the EP, as the remaining tracks were covers of country and rockabilly songs. Another track from NightFighter, "United or Divided" was later featured in the 1985 film Tomboy.

The group was popular in the Virginia area, as well as Washington, DC into the early 1980s. Later in the decade, Robbie House left the group to form the band Street Talk, and he was replaced by guitarist Norman Harrell. However, they could not duplicate the success they achieved with "Bad, Bad Billy", and the group faded from public view.

== Currently ==
Larson and House, who had originally comprised the duo Coyote and Robbie prior to joining Snuff, join regularly with Norman Harrell and other musicians to perform under the Snuff moniker.

In early September 2013, Larson, House, and Harrell reunited with Cecil Hooker and Michael Johnson from the classic Snuff lineup to perform at Hampton, Virginia's annual Bay Days festival.

== Band members ==
=== Classic lineup ===
- James Gray "Jimbo" Bowling - Six-string acoustic and electric guitars, vocals (now deceased)
- Robbie House - Acoustic and electric guitars, vocals
- Cecil Hooker - Violins (4- and 5-string)
- C. Scott Trabue - Bass guitar
- Michael A. Johnson - Drums, percussion, vocals
- Chuck "Coyote" Larson - Acoustic guitar, banjo, Lead Vocals

==== Later member ====
- Norman Harrell - Guitars, bass, Drums, vocals (replaced Robbie House; also played with the band prior to the "Classic lineup" days)

=== Earlier members ===
- Mike Jones - Vocals
- Bill Wampler - Guitars, vocals

== Discography ==
=== Albums ===
- 1982: Snuff (Elektra)
- 1983: NightFighter (E.P.) (Curb Records)

=== Singles ===
- 1982: "Boys in Oklahoma"
- 1982: "When Jokers Are Wild"
- 1982: "(So This is) Happy Hour"
- 1983: "Bad, Bad Billy"
- 1985: "United or Divided"
