= Reddy (album) =

Studio album by Helen Reddy
- Released: 1979
- Recorded: 1979
- Studios: Conway (Hollywood, California)
- Genre: Disco
- Length: 33:52
- Label: Capitol
- Producer: Frank Day

Helen Reddy chronology
Live In London (1978)	Reddy (1979)	Take What You Find (1980)

Reddy is the eleventh studio album release by Australian-American pop singer Helen Reddy. Between 1971 and 1978, Reddy had ten studio albums released by Capitol Records, the label also having issued her Greatest Hits album and a concert album: Live in London, the latter issued in December 1978 – which same month Reddy filed suit claiming Capitol Records had shortchanged her $1,793,000, the suit being an apparent bid to win release from the label. However Reddy, issued in June 1979, would be released by Capitol Records, Reddy's tenure with the label extending to include her twelfth studio album: Take What You Find, issued in 1980.

Reddy was noted by Billboard magazine for what set it apart from its predecessors: "It's the three disco tracks on the first side of this album that will probably draw the most attention, but more interesting from the point of view of Reddy's artistic growth are covers of soul ballads by Gamble & Huff ('Sing My Heart Out') and Eugene Record ('Trying to Get to You') and rock material by the likes of The Doobie Brothers ('Minute by Minute')." That same review from the issue dated 2 June of that year also mentioned the exposure she received from The Helen Reddy Special, which had just aired on ABC on 22 May, but, as with her previous two releases, Reddy did not reach Billboard's Top LP's & Tapes chart. It was also her last album to chart in Canada's RPM magazine when it peaked at number 97 there in August of that year.

== Singles ==
May 1979 saw the release of the track "Make Love to Me" as both a twelve-inch single featuring the entire seven-minute album cut and as a 3:48 7" single edit: the former was lauded in Billboard's "Disco Mix" column: "Reddy belts out this song with the right combination of orchestration and arrangements that have no need for a break as the tune never lets down in energy level through its 7:02-minute length." The 7" single debuted on the Hot 100 in the 19 May issue of Billboard to rise to a number 60 peak during a ten-week tenure: debuting on Billboard's Adult Contemporary chart dated 9 June, "Make Love to Me" would there spend five weeks reaching number 41 showings. "Make Love to Me" also provided Reddy with her only hit on Billboard's R&B with a seven week tenure from 28 July 1979 and a peak of number 59.

"Make Love to Me" also afforded Reddy her final Canadian hit parade appearance, peaking at number 57 on the RPM singles chart. In Australia the June 1979 release of the Reddy album was accompanied by the single release of the track "Minute by Minute" rather than "Make Love to Me", the original version of the latter by Scottish singer Kelly Marie being still then in the Top 40 of the national Australian hit parade after peaking at number 5 in March. However "Make Love to Me" would be issued as Reddy's second Australian single – and second Australian chart shortfall – in August 1979 (which month the Kelly Marie version ended its Australian chart tenure of 41 weeks).

In the US, "Let Me Be Your Woman" – a ballad first recorded by Linda Clifford – would be the second single from Reddy and would reach number 43 Adult Contemporary during a five-week run from 10 November 1979, becoming a Hot 100 shortfall.

== Reception ==
Professional ratings
Review scores
Source	Rating
AllMusic	3/5 stars

Both AllMusic and Billboard suggested that this should have been Reddy's comeback album, the latter noting that her "album sales have tapered off in the past few years, but this LP proves that she is staying on top of trends rather than being content to stay in a cozy but confining MOR rut." AllMusic's Charles Donovan writes retrospectively: "Her Top Ten days were over, but on the strength of this set, they shouldn't have been." Other critics were less enthused: Peter Reilly of Stereo Review dismissed Reddy as "a disco album that goes like clockwork - and is about as interesting. [Reddy's] sound and performances are Precise, Rigid and, above all, Accurate..'Make Love to Me' ([a potentially] engaging empty headed piece of fluff) is about as feverish and abandoned as John Travolta's agent closing a deal. 'Let Me Be Your Woman' has the properly improperly lustiness of disco passion in its lyrics, but Reddy's performance [implies the] unspoken condition: only if your finish your oatmeal first. The album is engineered so that her adenoinal, girdled voice always rises above it all. Would that the listener could do the same." Christine Hogan of the Sydney Morning Herald similarly branded Reddy "a vocal technician [who] presents material in much the same fashion and with about as much feeling as a computer. [While] she sings well [on 'Reddy] particularly on songs such as..'Minute by Minute' but on 'Make Love to Me' and 'Perfect Love Affair' a hard edge creeps into her voice. She might do better controlling herself a little less".

== Track listing ==
Side 1

1. "Trying to Get to You" (Eugene Record) – 3:36
  - Danny Seraphine – drums
  - Teddy Randazzo – keyboards
  - Jai Winding – keyboards
  - Ira Newborn – guitar
  - Bill Neale – guitar
  - Thom Rotella – guitar
  - Chuck Rainey – bass guitar
  - Ernie Watts – sax solo
2. "Perfect Love Affair" (Pat Upton) – 3:34
  - James Gadson – drums
  - Teddy Randazzo – keyboards
  - Pete Robinson – keyboards
  - Paul Jackson Jr. – guitar
  - Robert Bowles – guitar
  - Eddie Watkins, Jr. – bass guitar
  - Ernie Watts – sax solo
3. "The Magic Is Still There" (Garry Paige, Mark Punch) – 2:58
  - Ed Greene – drums
  - Teddy Randazzo – keyboards
  - Jai Winding – keyboards
  - Robert White – guitar
  - Bill Neale – guitar
  - Scott Edwards – bass guitar
4. "Make Love to Me" (Michael Tinsley, Steven Voice, Peter Yellowstone) – 7:00
  - James Gadson – drums
  - Teddy Randazzo – keyboards
  - Pete Robinson – keyboards
  - Paul Jackson Jr. – guitar
  - Robert Bowles – guitar
  - Thom Rotella – guitar
  - Eddie Watkins, Jr. – bass guitar

Side 2

1. "Minute by Minute" (Lester Abrams, Michael McDonald) – 3:50
  - Danny Seraphine – drums
  - Teddy Randazzo – keyboards
  - Jai Winding – keyboards
  - Ira Newborn – guitar
  - Bill Neale – guitar
  - Chuck Rainey – bass guitar
2. "Let Me Be Your Woman" (Ed Fournier) – 3:00
  - Ed Greene – drums
  - Bill Cuomo – keyboards
  - Thom Rotella – guitar
  - Eddie Watkins, Jr. – bass guitar
3. "You're So Good" (Fred Freeman, Harry Nehls) – 2:59
  - James Gadson – drums
  - Teddy Randazzo – keyboards
  - Paul Jackson Jr. – guitar
  - Robert Bowles – guitar
  - Eddie Watkins, Jr. – bass guitar
  - Tower of Power horn section – horns
  - Lenny Pickett – sax solo
4. "Words Are Not Enough" (Garry Paige, Mark Punch) – 3:07
  - Ed Greene – drums
  - Chet McCracken – drums
  - Robert Lamm – keyboards
  - Teddy Randazzo – keyboards
  - Robert White – guitar
  - Bill Neale – guitar
  - Thom Rotella – guitar
  - Chuck Rainey – bass guitar
  - Leon Gaer – bass guitar
  - James Pankow – horns
  - Lee Loughnane – horns
  - Ernie Watts – horns
5. "Sing My Heart Out" (Kenny Gamble, Leon Huff) – 3:48
  - Danny Seraphine – drums
  - Jai Winding – keyboards
  - Ira Newborn – guitar
  - Bill Neale – guitar
  - Chuck Rainey – bass guitar

Rarities from the Capitol Vaults tracks

In 2009 EMI Music Special Markets released Rarities from the Capitol Vaults, a 12-track CD of mostly what were previously unreleased Reddy recordings. One of the songs included was taken from the recording sessions for Reddy:

- "Exhaustion" (Robin Sinclair) – 2:28

== Personnel ==
- Helen Reddy – vocals
- Frank Day – producer; basic track arranger ("Let Me Be Your Woman", "You're So Good")
- Bruce Sperling – associate producer
- McKinley Jackson – arranger
- John Florez – basic track producer ("Let Me Be Your Woman", "You're So Good")
- D'Arneill Pershing – basic track arranger ("Let Me Be Your Woman", "You're So Good")
- James Pankow – horn arranger ("Words Are Not Enough")
- Greg Adams – horn arranger ("You're So Good")
- Buddy Brundo – recording and mixing engineer
- Cris Gordon – assistant engineer
- Phil Moores – assistant engineer
  - recording and mixing at Conway Recording Studios, Hollywood, California
- Ken Perry – mastering
  - mastered at Capitol Studios, Hollywood, California
- Claude Mougin – photography
- Roy Kohara – art direction
- Ben Barrett – contractor
- Robert Lamm – background vocals
- Jon English – background vocals
- Dan Hamilton – background vocals
- Brenda Jones – background vocals
- Shirley Jones – background vocals
- Valorie Jones – background vocals
- The Sweet Inspirations – background vocals
- Lee Loughnane – trumpet
- Steve Kupka – trumpet; trombone
- Greg Adams – trumpet
- Ricky Baptist – trumpet
- Steve Madio – trumpet
- Oscar Brashear – trumpet
- Jerry Hey – trumpet
- Gary Grant – trumpet
- Alan Kaplan – trumpet
- James Pankow – trombone
- Charles Loper – trombone
- Jack Redmond – trombone
- Lew McCreary – trombone
- Emilio Castillo – saxophone
- Lenny Pickett – saxophone
- Mic Gillette – saxophone
- Bill Green – saxophone
- Terry Harrington – saxophone
- Ernie Watts – saxophone
- Harry Bluestone – string concertmaster
- Laudir de Oliveira – percussion

== Charts ==
Chart (1979)	Peak position
Canadian Albums (RPM)	97
