= You're My World =

1964 single by Cilla Black

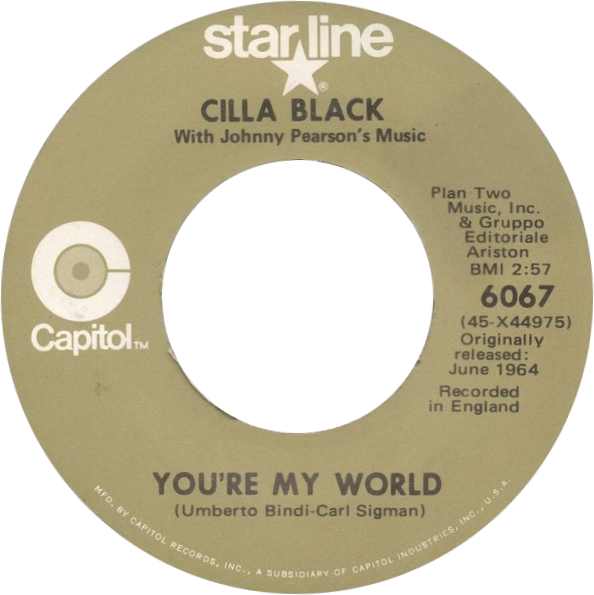
- US reissue of the Cilla Black recording

Single by Cilla Black

from the album The Best of Cilla Black
- B-side: "Suffer Now I Must"
- Released: May 1964
- Recorded: 3 April 1964
- Studio: Abbey Road, London
- Genre: Easy listening
- Length: 2:58
- Label: Parlophone (most countries); Capitol (US/Canada)
- Songwriters: Umberto Bindi, Gino Paoli, Carl Sigman
- Producer: George Martin

Cilla Black singles chronology
"Anyone Who Had a Heart" (1964)	"You're My World" (1964)	"It's for You" (1964)

Official audio
- "You're My World" by Cilla Black on YouTube

Performance video
- "You're My World" (live) by Cilla Black on YouTube

Video
- "You're My World" by Cilla Black on YouTube

"You're My World" is a cover of Italian ballad originally recorded in 1963 as "Il mio mondo" ("My World") by Umberto Bindi, who co-wrote the original version with Gino Paoli. Subsequently, an English version was commissioned, and the lyrics were written by Carl Sigman as "You're My World". The song reached No. 1 in Australia (twice), Belgium, Mexico, Netherlands, South Africa and the United Kingdom in recordings by Cilla Black, Daryl Braithwaite, Guys 'n' Dolls and Helen Reddy. Black's and Reddy's versions reached the US Top 40 in 1964 and 1977, respectively. The song also reached No. 1 in France and Spain in the respective translations "Ce monde" and "Mi Mundo", both sung by Richard Anthony.

== 1960s hit versions ==
=== Cilla Black ===
Although the original Italian version by composer Umberto Bindi was not a hit, even in Italy, the song came to the attention of UK record producer George Martin, who commissioned an English version to be recorded by his protégée Cilla Black. The English lyrics were written by Carl Sigman whose son Michael Sigman recalled: "Inspired by Umberto Bindi's haunting melody, Carl evoked Gino Paoli's Italian title ('Il Mio Mondo' or 'My World'). But he created a wholly original English lyric."

Black cut the song "You're My World"—as Carl Sigman entitled his English language rendering of the song—in a session at Abbey Road Studios with Johnny Pearson conducting his orchestra on 3 April 1964 and The Breakaways providing background vocals. Black has said that her road manager and future husband Bobby Willis also sang on the track. Judd Proctor was the lead guitarist on the session which also featured drummer Kenny Clare.

"You're My World" reached No. 1 in Britain on the chart dated 30 May 1964 and remained there for a total of four weeks, one week more than Black's preceding single "Anyone Who Had a Heart". Although Black returned to the UK Top Ten eight times, the song was her final No. 1 hit.

Black's "You're My World" was also No. 1 in Australia for two weeks that July when it also spent three weeks at No. 2 in New Zealand, while in South Africa the disc was the second biggest hit for the year 1964. A top twenty hit in Denmark and a top thirty hit in the Netherlands, the track also reached No. 12 in Canada, No. 2 in Ireland, No. 8 in Norway and No. 7 in Sweden.

"You're My World" was the first track by Black to be released in the US, where the singer was signed to Capitol Records. Peaking at No. 26 in August 1964, the song was Black's only Top 40 hit in the United States. She also reached number four on the Easy Listening chart.

An alternative take from the recording sessions which yielded the Cilla Black hit version of "You're My World" was later issued, with the opening notes being likened to be the sound of musicians tuning up. Both the 1964 versions, however, remain faithful to Bindi's strong vocal delivery and the instrumentation of his original recording in Italian.

Black remade the song in 1985 for her Surprisingly Cilla album and then again in 1993 for her Through the Years album; both tracks attempted to capture the original's orchestral quality via synthesizers. Over the Christmas season of 2008 Black came out of retirement for her professional swansong playing the Fairy Godmother in the Cinderella panto at the Liverpool Empire Theatre, each presentation of which concluded with Black joined by her castmates in a performance of You're My World.

Reportedly when the hearse bearing Black's body arrived at St Mary's Church, Woolton for her 20 August 2015 funeral mass, "hundreds of fans broke into Cilla's 1964 hit 'You're My World'". The grave marker beneath the headstone on Black's burial plot in Allerton Cemetery is inscribed with the second and third stanzas of "You're My World": lyrics from Black's hits "Step Inside Love" and "Alfie" also appear on the marker. (The black marble headstone and marker were installed 18 April 2016 some eight months after Black's 1 August 2015 passing: following the December 2015 theft of its original bronze nameplate Black's grave remained unmarked until drier weather permitted the installation of the marble headstone and marker.)

On 16 January 2017 a bronze statue of Cilla Black was unveiled on Mathew Street in Liverpool being positioned outside the entrance of the Cavern Club where Black was discovered: Black is represented standing on an oversize depiction of a 45" single copy of "You're My World".

==== Personnel ====
- Cilla Black – vocals
- The Breakaways – backing vocals
- Bobby Willis – backing vocals

=== Also ===
Subsequent to the success of Cilla Black's "You're My World" in the English-speaking world, Richard Anthony recorded a translation for release in France as "Ce Monde", which was No. 1 for six weeks in the summer of 1964 and that autumn reached No. 3 in Belgium (Wallonia). Anthony also made the song a hit in its original Italian format, taking "Il Mio Mondo" into the Italian charts for the first time with a No. 20 peak in 1964/5. Anthony, who recorded the English rendition under the title "You Are My World", also reached No. 1 in Spain in January 1965 with the rendering "Mi Mundo" which afforded Anthony a concurrent Top Ten hit in Argentina despite a local version by Juan Ramón (es)—entitled "En Mi Mundo"—having reached the Argentine Top 20 in the autumn of 1964.

Ria Bartok Columbia ESRF 1509
A1/ Ce Monde • A2/ Ne M'Appelle Plus Jamais
B1/ Tu As Perdu La Tête • B2/ Tu Peux Pas Savoir
Ria Bartok Pathé 77-519
Ce Monde b/w Tu As Perdu La Tête

Paris-based German-born songstress Ria Bartok (fr) recorded "Ce Monde" for a four track EP released by Columbia/EMI (France) in September 1964: that same month the track was issued as 7" single Pathé 77–519 in Canada where it reached No. 1 on that nation's French-language chart. Bartok also included "Mi Mundo" on a Spanish-language EP she recorded. "Ce Monde" was also featured on the 1965 album release Ria Bartok Pathé PAM 67.214

The success of the Cilla Black version of "You're My World" in South Africa did not preclude the success of a local cover version by Ray Walter which rose as high as No. 2 on South Africa's weekly hit parade.

The Finnish language rendering of "You're My World" entitled "Olet kaikki" has become a pop music standard in Finland due to its success on the Finnish hit parade as recorded by Johnny Liebkind (fi) on October 26, 1968.

== 1970s hit versions ==
=== Daryl Braithwaite ===
"You're My World"

Single by Daryl Braithwaite
- B-side: "Princess"
- Released: October 1974
- Recorded: October 1974
- Studio: Armstrong's Studios, Melbourne
- Length: 3:05
- Label: Infinity
- Producer: Tweed Harris

Daryl Braithwaite singles chronology
"You're My World" (1974)	"Cavalry" (1975)

Audio
- "You're My World" by Daryl Braitwaite on YouTube

Daryl Braithwaite of Sherbet remade "You're My World" as his first solo recording; released in October 1974 the track entered the Australian chart dated November 11, 1974 following Braithwaite's performing of "You're My World" on the debut episode of the iconic Australian pop music show Countdown broadcast November 8, 1974. Produced by Tweed Harris, Braithwaite's "You're My World" spent the first three weeks of 1975 at No. 1 on the Australian chart. At the 1975 Australian Record Awards, the song won Braithwaite Male Vocal Single of the Year. The song was certified gold in Australia and sold over 90,000 copies.

It was Braithwaite's version of "You're My World" that inspired a young Tina Arena who heard her sister's copy of Braithwaite's single; Arena's impromptu performance of "You're My World" at a wedding led to her launching her performing career at age 7 on the TV show "Young Talent Time". However Arena has never recorded "You're My World". Daryl Braithwaite remade "You're My World" for his 2008 album The Lemon Tree which featured acoustic remakes of several of his hits.

==== Tracklisting ====
7" (Infinity – K-5705)

- Side A "You're My World" – 3:05
- Side B "Princess" – 3:10

==== Charts ====
===== Weekly charts =====
Chart (1974/75)	Peak position
Australia (Kent Music Report)	1

===== Year-end charts =====
Chart (1974)	Position
Australia (Kent Music Report)	43
Chart (1975)	Position
Australia (Kent Music Report)	18

==== Certifications ====
Region	Certification	Certified units/sales
Australia (ARIA)	Gold	90,000

=== Helen Reddy ===
"You're My World"
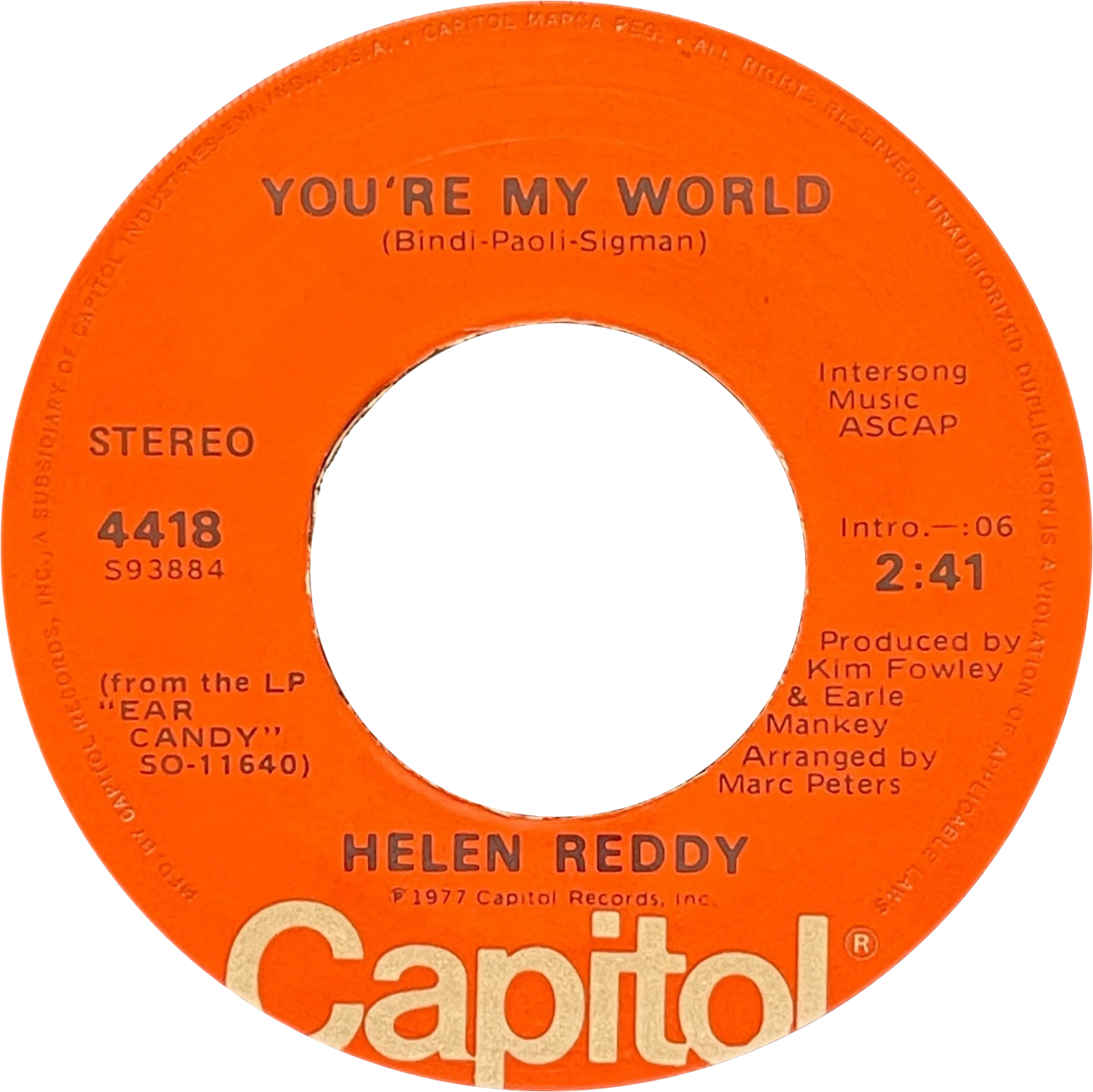
- US single of the Helen Reddy recording

Single by Helen Reddy

from the album Ear Candy
- B-side: "Thank You"
- Released: 4 April 1977
- Genre: Easy listening
- Length: 2:41
- Label: Capitol
- Songwriters: Umberto Bindi, Gino Paoli, Carl Sigman
- Producers: Kim Fowley, Earle Mankey

Helen Reddy singles chronology
"Gladiola" (1976)	"You're My World" (1977)	"The Happy Girls" (1977)

"You're My World" became a Top 20 hit in the US in 1977 via a remake by Helen Reddy introduced on Ear Candy, her ninth studio album, whose February 1977 recording at Brother Studios in Santa Monica was helmed by veteran producer Kim Fowley with the assistance of Earle Mankey with arranging/conducting duties carried out by David Carr. Ritchie Blackmore has been credited with playing guitar on Reddy's recording of "You're My World": Deep Purple, the group Blackmore had fronted, had been managed by Jeff Wald who in 1977 was Helen Reddy's manager and husband (Blackmore's name does not appear in the official credits listed on the Ear Candy album).

Although Reddy's eighth studio album Music, Music (1976) had been certified gold, its second single release "Gladiola" had been Reddy's first Billboard Hot 100 shortfall since her 1971 Hot 100 debut with "I Don't Know How to Love Him" (of Reddy's fifteen 1971–1976 Hot 100 entries all but two had reached the Top 20 affording her ten Top 20 hits). Jeff Wald, then Reddy's husband and manager, stated in 1977: "Helen has enough hits to be established in the public mind ... but it still shakes you when you're suddenly not on the charts". Wald therefore had not wanted Reddy's ninth studio album to be (quote) "just another Helen Reddy album[:] I let it be known on the street that whoever came to me with the right material, with a hit song, was going to produce Helen Reddy ... I wanted hit singles and something a little different": "I called every publisher in town: listened to 800–900 songs"; "I let a dozen producers walk into this office and play me a song. I called Kim Fowley and let him know I would like to hear from him, what his ideas were and of all the guys who walked into my office he had the most material that I liked": "He played me five songs, four of which I liked immediately".

Reddy recalled singing along to radio play of Cilla Black's 1964 hit version of "You're My World": (quote) "When it was suggested [in 1977] as a track for me to record, I leapt like a trout to the fly."

Reddy gave her debut televised performance of "You're My World" on the 6 May 1977 broadcast of The Midnight Special. During the year 1977 Reddy promoted "You're My World" via performances on five episodes of The Tonight Show.

A smash hit in Chicago (chart peak: #4), Reddy's "You're My World" otherwise failed to break in any first-tier metropolitan market: the track did reach #1 in Buffalo—where WKBW-AM ranked "You're My World" as the #5 hit of 1977—and received moderate support in a number of regional markets, reaching a Billboard Hot 100 peak of #18 in July 1977. "You're My World" was thus Reddy's highest-charting single since "Ain't No Way to Treat a Lady" almost two years previously, besting the #29 peak of "I Can't Hear You No More" the lead single off Reddy's precedent Music, Music album: however "You're My World" proved to be Reddy's last Top 40 hit. With a debut on the Hot 100 dated 30 April 1977 and final appearance 24 September 1977, "You're My World" ties with Reddy's signature #1 hit "I am Woman" as the singer's longest-running Hot 100 hit. Commenting on the lengthy chart tenure of the Top Ten shortfall "You're My World", Jeff Wald stated: "As busy as [Capitol Records] are with ten [or] eleven acts with [rising chart hits] they didn't lose the Helen Reddy record, they didn't give up on it ... There's not many [major labels] that would stay with the record of an established artist, not a new artist that they're trying to break, stay with a record for nineteen [or so] weeks like that and pound it and pound it and pound it."

"You're My World" fell short of "I Can't Hear You No More"'s #1 peak on the Billboard Easy Listening Top 50 which afforded "You're My World" a peak of #5: however "You're My World" was overall a more substantial Easy Listening hit than "I Can't Hear You No More", as evidenced by Billboard's ranking "You're My World" as the #12 Easy Listening hit for the year 1977: "I Can't Hear You No More" had placed on Billboard's annual Easy Listening tally for 1976 at #39. Reddy placed seven more tracks in the Easy Listening Top 50, the most successful of which was her 1978 remake of "We'll Sing in the Sunshine" (peak #12).

"You're My World" also reached number #13 on the Canadian pop chart. The potential for further international success for Reddy's version of "You're My World" was narrowed by the concurrent release of a remake by UK pop group Guys 'n' Dolls which was a #1 hit in the Netherlands and Flemish Belgium: although the Guys 'n' Dolls version was unsuccessful in the British Isles its release there did cause Capitol UK to make Ear Candy's lead single the track "Long Distance Love" with "You're My World" as B-side, while in the Netherlands Reddy's co-write "Midnight Skies" was the choice for single (with "Long Distance Love" as B-side) with neither local release affording Reddy any success. In Reddy's native Australia a remake of "You're My World" had been a #1 hit in January 1975 for Daryl Braithwaite factoring into the Australian release of the spring 1977 Australian release of Reddy's version being unsuccessful. "You're My World" did afford Reddy a #1 hit in Mexico, with the track remaining in that nation's Top Ten from October 1977 to March 1978.

Reddy's 1978 concert album Live in London, recorded at the London Palladium, features the singer performing "You're My World".

Reddy's studio recording of "You're My World" is heard at the opening of the 2019 biopic I Am Woman.

==== Chart performance ====
U.S. charts (1977)		Highest weekly ranking	Year-end tally
Billboard	Hot 100	18	56
Billboard	Easy Listening Top 50	5	12
Cash Box Top 100		16	65
Record World Singles Chart		23	did not rank

International charts (1977)		Highest weekly ranking	Year-end tally
Canada	RPM 100 Singles	13	119
Canada	RPM Adult Oriented Playlist	13	n/a
Mexico		1	n/a

=== Guys 'n' Dolls version ===
A remake of "You're My World" by the British group Guys 'n' Dolls was overlooked in the UK but reached No. 1 in the Netherlands for four weeks in May and June 1977 with a #4 ranking on the year-end tally for the Netherlands' hit parade: the track also reached No. 1 in Belgium and was a minor hit in Germany (No. 48) (in its release in the two last-named territories, the track was identified as "You Are My World"). Dominic Grant sang lead on the Guys 'n' Dolls version of "You're My World" with Martine Howard's vocals also prominently featured.

== Miscellany ==
A thirty-three second outtake from an Abbey Road Studios session by the Beatles dated 3 June 1964 is said to be a snippet of "You're My World". It is presumed that the recording is still in the Abbey Road vaults; it has not been released or bootlegged.

Elvis Presley kept a copy of the Cilla Black single of "You're My World" in his personal jukebox. When the Beatles visited Presley at his Bel Air home on 27 August 1965 the group jammed with Presley in an impromptu rendition of "You're My World". Reportedly, the song was deemed a tribute to Presley's intended wife Priscilla Beaulieu, as its singer Cilla Black's full first name was Priscilla.

Miss America 1986 Susan Akin (Miss Mississippi 1985) sang "You're My World" in the talent competition of the Miss America Pageant broadcast on NBC 14 September 1985 from Convention Hall in Atlantic City.

== See also ==
- List of 1960s one-hit wonders in the United States
