= I Can't Hear You No More =

1964 single by Betty Everett

"I Can't Hear You"
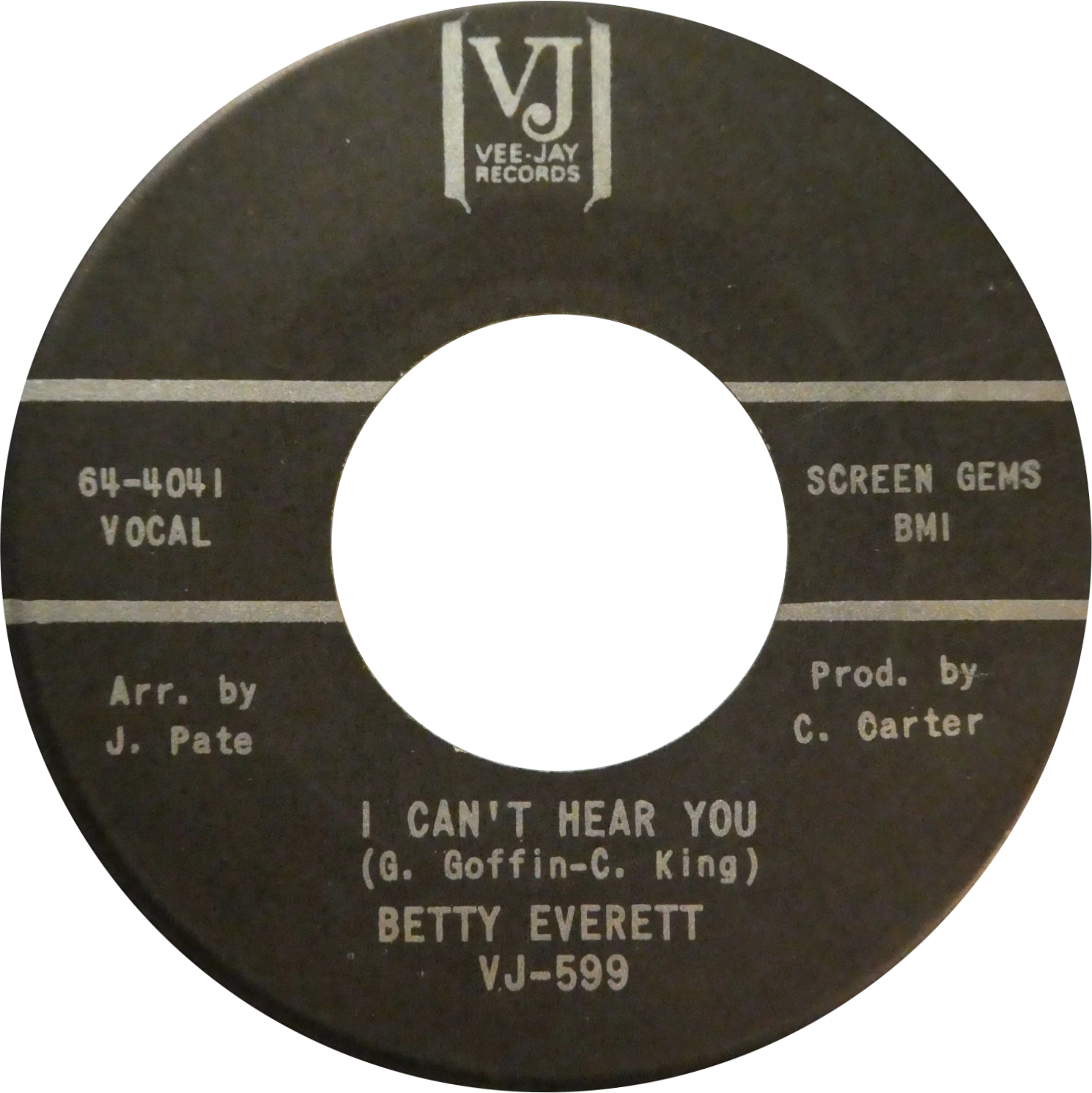
- US single of the Betty Everett recording

Single by Betty Everett
- B-side: "Can I Get to Know You"
- Released: 1964
- Recorded: May 13, 1964
- Genre: R&B
- Length: 2:36
- Label: Vee-Jay
- Songwriters: Gerry Goffin, Carole King

Betty Everett singles chronology
"The Shoop Shoop Song (It's in His Kiss)" (1964)	"I Can't Hear You" (1964)	"Let It Be Me" (1964)

"I Can't Hear You No More" is a composition written by Gerry Goffin and Carole King. It was originally recorded as "I Can't Hear You" in 1964 by Betty Everett. The most successful version was the 1976 top 40 single by Helen Reddy.

== Betty Everett's original version ==
The Betty Everett version was released in the summer of 1964 as the follow-up to her top ten song "The Shoop Shoop Song". Robert Pruter in his book Chicago Soul describes "I Can't Hear You" as a "surprisingly weak [song] for Goffin-King that did not give the Vee Jay [Records] staff [musicians] much to work with" and dismisses Everett's single with its number 39 R&B chart (as reported in Cash Box magazine) as "essentially a non-hit." "I Can't Hear You" appeared on the Billboard Hot 100 with a peak of number 66, and number 85 on the Cash Box Pop 100.

== Lulu version ==
In the UK, Lulu recorded "I Can't Hear You No More" as the follow-up to her breakthrough hit "Shout"; produced by Peter Sullivan and released as "Can't Hear You No More" on 28 August 1964. The single fell short of the UK Singles Chart.

== Dusty Springfield version ==
Dusty Springfield's version of "I Can't Hear You No More" appears on her Ev'rything's Coming Up Dusty UK album release, and on its US equivalent You Don't Have to Say You Love Me. Having premiered her version of "I Can't Hear You No More" on the 28 April 1965 Ready Steady Go! 'Sound of Motown' broadcast, with Martha and the Vandellas providing background vocals and a pre-recorded track by Motown's Funk Brothers, Springfield recorded "I Can't Hear You No More" in a 2 July 1965 session at Philips Studios in Marble Arch, with Philips owner Johnny Franz credited as producer (Springfield has stated she herself produced all her mid-1960s recordings). The session, conducted by Ivor Raymonde and featuring Madeline Bell and Doris Troy on background vocals, is a rare instance of Springfield recording with her touring band the Echoes.

== Carole King version ==
Carole King herself recorded "I Can't Hear You No More" for her debut solo album Writer in 1970. In his book The Words and Music of Carole King, James Perone says the song "works well enough for King, but the style of the song and the arrangement" - Perone calls the arrangement "Philadelphia soul influenced" - "are such that it doesn't have the impact of some of King's later compositions that were designed around her physical and rhetorical voice."

== Helen Reddy version ==
"I Can't Hear You No More"
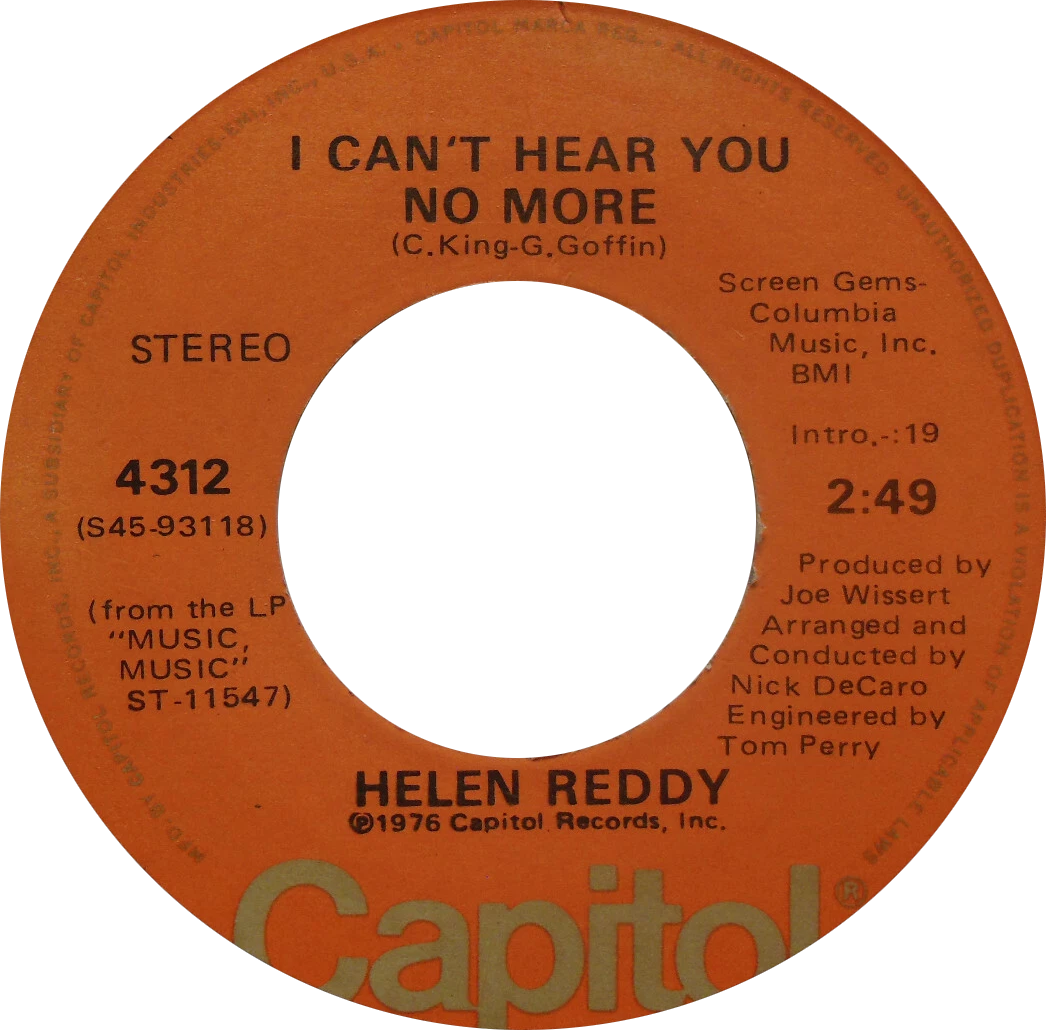
- US single of the Helen Reddy recording

Single by Helen Reddy

from the album Music, Music
- B-side: "Music Is My Life"
- Released: 1976
- Genre: Easy listening
- Length: 2:49
- Label: Capitol
- Songwriters: Gerry Goffin, Carole King
- Producer: Joe Wissert

Helen Reddy singles chronology
"Somewhere in the Night" (1975)	"I Can't Hear You No More" (1976)	"Gladiola" (1976)

The 1976 Helen Reddy version was the most successful version which was released as the lead single for her album release Music, Music. The musicians included Victor Feldman (percussion), Harvey Mason and Jeff Porcaro (drums), David Paich (keyboards), Ray Parker Jr. (guitar) and Tom Scott (saxophone). The albums's credited background vocalists include Jim Gilstrap, Myrna Matthews, Lisa Freeman and Carolyn Willis. Reddy unhappily recorded "I Can't Hear You No More" at the strong suggestion of Capitol Records who hoped a disco influenced song might boost Reddy's career. Ironically "I Can't Hear You No More" became a number 1 Easy Listening hit - Reddy's eighth and last and was also her next to last Billboard Top 40 hit with a number 29 peak. Record World and Cash Box both ranked the track at a number 41 peak).

== Other versions ==
The song was also recorded by various groups:

- The Newbeats as the B-side to their 1965 single, "Little Child".
- The song is featured in the 1969 film The Reckoning in a live performance by the band "The Spectrum" (Keith Forsey on drums) and featured a lead vocal by actress and vocalist Patricia Gratton.
- The Move also have a fast paced version of this song on their Anthology 1966-1972 compilation album (2008).

== See also ==
- List of number-one adult contemporary singles of 1976 (U.S.)
