= Somewhere in the Night (Helen Reddy song) =

1975 single by Helen Reddy

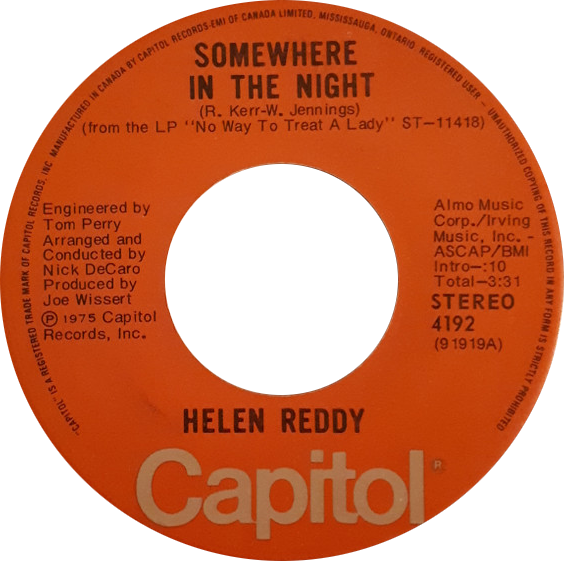
- Canadian single of the Helen Reddy recording

Single by Helen Reddy

from the album No Way to Treat a Lady
- B-side: "Ten to Eight"
- Released: November 1975
- Recorded: 1975
- Genre: Easy listening
- Length: 3:31
- Label: Capitol
- Songwriters: Richard Kerr, Will Jennings
- Producer: Joe Wissert

Helen Reddy singles chronology
| "Ain't No Way to Treat a Lady" (1975) | "Somewhere in the Night" (1975) | "I Can't Hear You No More" (1976) |

"Somewhere in the Night"
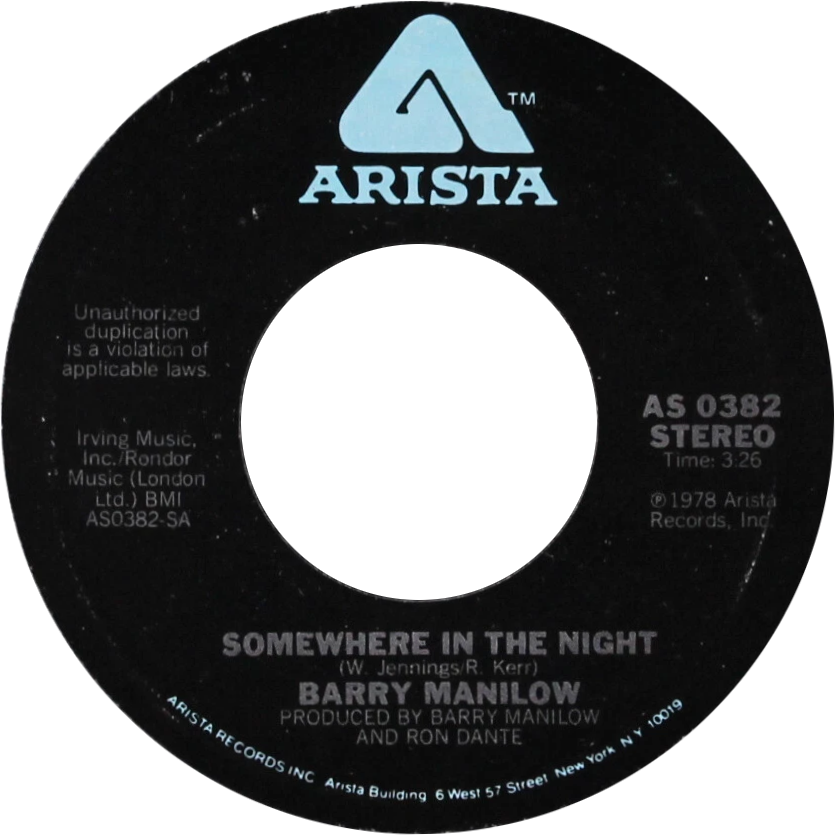
- US single of the Barry Manilow recording

Single by Barry Manilow

from the album Even Now
- A-side: "Somewhere in the Night" (US/Canada); "Copacabana" (UK)
- B-side: "Leavin' in the Morning" (US/Canada) "Somewhere in the Night" (UK)
- Released: 7 July 1978
- Recorded: 1978
- Genre: Easy listening
- Label: Arista
- Songwriters: Richard Kerr; Will Jennings
- Producers: Barry Manilow; Ron Dante

Barry Manilow singles chronology
| "Ready to Take a Chance Again" (1978) | "Somewhere in the Night" (1978) | "Ships" (1979) |

"Somewhere in the Night" is a ballad written by Richard Kerr and lyricist Will Jennings which was a US Top 20 hit for both Helen Reddy and Barry Manilow.

The first song composed by Kerr and Jennings as a team, "Somewhere in the Night" appeared on four 1975 album releases: You Are a Song by Batdorf & Rodney, Rising Sun by Yvonne Elliman, No Way to Treat a Lady by Helen Reddy released July 1975 and Kim Carnes' November 1975 eponymous album release. The Yvonne Elliman version was released as a single in August 1975 which month also saw the release of a "Somewhere in the Night" single recorded by the song's co-writer Richard Kerr: Kerr's version would have its UK release in January 1976 when it also served as the title cut of an album release by Kerr. However, "Somewhere in the Night" did not appear on any chart until the Batdorf & Rodney version was issued as a single in October 1975 and reached #69 on the Billboard Hot 100.

The qualified success of the Batdorf & Rodney version did not preclude the December 1975 release of Helen Reddy's version of "Somewhere in the Night" as the follow-up single to her hit "Ain't No Way to Treat a Lady". Unique as a third single released from a Helen Reddy album - the first single from the No Way to Treat a Lady album, "Bluebird", had an abbreviated release - "Somewhere in the Night" hit #2 at Easy Listening radio and #19 on the Billboard Hot 100 in early 1976. Reddy would have one subsequent single reach the Top 20, that being "You're My World" in 1977. "Somewhere in the Night" would also reach #27 in New Zealand in February 1976, affording Reddy her final hit in that territory.

Barry Manilow, whose breakout #1 hit "Mandy" had been written by Scott English and Richard Kerr, and who later reached #1 with the Kerr/Jennings composition "Looks Like We Made It", recorded "Somewhere in the Night" for his 1978 album Even Now. In July 1978 Manilow's version of "Somewhere in the Night" was issued as the flip of Manilow's single "Copacabana" for its release in the UK where both sides of the single received airplay although the single only reached a UK chart peak of #42. In December 1978 "Somewhere in the Night" became the fourth track from Even Now to be given single release in the US, reaching #9 on Billboard's Hot 100 in early 1979.

According to liner notes on the Even Now album, personnel on Manilow's recording include:

- Barry Manilow – vocals, piano
- Jeff Mironov – guitar
- Bob Babbitt – bass
- Paul Shaffer – electric piano
- Jimmy Young – drums
- Jimmy Maelen – percussion
- Dick Behrke - orchestration

Cash Box said that Manilow's version "develops into an emotional, dramatic work which climaxes at the chorus."

Charted versions of Somewhere in the Night (Kerr/ Jennings)
| Artist/ year of recording | Chart & peak |
|---|---|
| Batdorf & Rodney/ 1975 | U.S. Billboard Hot 100 #69; U.S. Billboard Easy Listening #24 |
| Helen Reddy/ 1975 | U.S. Billboard Hot 100 #19; U.S. Billboard Easy Listening #2; Canada RPM Top Singles #27; Canada Adult Contemporary #2; New Zealand #27 |
| Barry Manilow/ 1978 | U.S. Billboard Hot 100 #9; U.S. Billboard Easy Listening #4; Canada RPM Top Singles #10; Canada Adult Contemporary #3 Ireland #16, UK #42*^{1}, Australia #81 |
Footnote
^{*1}Double A-side chart item with "Copacabana"
