= Richard Kerr (songwriter) =

- Born: Richard Buchanan Kerr; 14 December 1944
- Died: 8 December 2023 (aged 78)
- Genres: Pop
- Occupation(s): Singer, songwriter, composer

Richard Buchanan Kerr (14 December 1944 – 8 December 2023) was an English singer-songwriter and composer, who co-wrote "Mandy", "Looks Like We Made It", and "Somewhere in the Night" (all of which became hit singles for Barry Manilow) and "I'll Never Love This Way Again", for Dionne Warwick.

== Life and career ==
Richard Buchanan Kerr was born on 14 December 1944.

Kerr began his education at Bedford School. After gaining an interest in music at school he went into songwriting. In the UK, he collaborated with musicians in the late 1960s and early 1970s such as Peter Green, Don Partridge and Scott English. The last pairing resulted in the song "Brandy", which English released in 1971. This song later become a worldwide hit under the title "Mandy" for Barry Manilow in 1974, although Don Partridge's "Blue Eyes" was Kerr's first hit as a songwriter.

In 1976, Kerr's solo album, Richard Kerr (re-titled Somewhere in the Night in some territories) was released by Epic Records, and in 2014 it was released digitally on iTunes. Kerr's album Welcome to the Club (1978, A&M Records) featured songs co-written with John Bettis, Gary Osborne, and Will Jennings. Kerr's other albums include From Now Until Then, No Looking Back, Songwriter, and Reflections of Richard Kerr.

His most important collaboration was with the American lyricist Will Jennings. They wrote such popular songs as "Looks Like We Made It", a No. 1 hit for Barry Manilow, "Somewhere in the Night", which was a hit for Helen Reddy and later for Barry Manilow (1978), and "I'll Never Love This Way Again" for Dionne Warwick.

In 1997, along with lyricist Don Black, Kerr wrote "You Stayed Away Too Long", sung by 18-year-old Joanne May, one of the four finalists in the Great British Song Contest, the UK heat for the Eurovision Song Contest. It came third.

Kerr died on 8 December 2023, at the age of 78.

== Discography (as main artist) ==
- From Now Until Then (1973), Warner Bros.
- Reflections of Richard Kerr (1974), Rondor Music
- Richard Kerr (re-titled Somewhere in the Night in some territories) (1976), Epic (album was reissued on iTunes in 2014 from the master tapes)
- Welcome to the Club (1978), A&M
- Songwriter (1981), Almo Irving Music (promotional LP only)
- No Looking Back (1982), A&M

== Hit compositions ==
- "Mandy" – Barry Manilow (No. 1 US), Westlife (No. 1 UK), Scott English (under the original title "Brandy") (No. 12 UK), Johnny Mathis, Andy Williams, Donny Osmond
- "Looks Like We Made It" – Barry Manilow (No. 1 US)
- "I'll Never Love This Way Again" – Dionne Warwick (No. 5 US), Cheryl Ladd, Tom Jones, Billie Jo Spears, Regine Velasquez, The Nolans, Mijares, Yuri.
- "Somewhere in the Night" – Barry Manilow (No. 9 US), Helen Reddy (No. 19 US), Kim Carnes, Yvonne Elliman, and Batdorf & Rodney (No. 24 AC US)
- "No Night So Long" – Dionne Warwick (No. 23 US, No. 1 AC US)
- "Shine On" – L.T.D. (No. 40 US)
- "I'm Dreaming" – Jennifer Warnes (No. 50 US, No. 9 AC US)
- "Where Did We Go Wrong" – Frankie Valli & Chris Forde (No. 4 AC US)
- "A Little Bit of Heaven" – Natalie Cole (No. 11 AC US)
- "Don't Close Your Eyes Tonight" – John Denver (No. 37 AC US)
- "Blue Eyes" – Don Partridge (No. 3 UK)
- "I Am What I Am" – Greyhound (No. 20 UK)

== Other recorded songs ==
- "In Another World" – Barry Manilow
- "Life Will Go On" – Barry Manilow
- "Where Are They Now?" – Barry Manilow
- "Dance Away" – Barry Manilow, Elkie Brooks, Shelly West
- "When The Good Times Come Again" – Barry Manilow, Dionne Warwick
- "You Made Me Want To Love Again" – Dionne Warwick
- "Age of Miracles" – Dionne Warwick
- "I Can't Afford That Feeling Anymore" – Rita Coolidge, David Soul, Clodagh Rodgers
- "Congratulations" – Jeffrey Osborne
- "Love The Way You Do" – Kenny Rogers
- "Stand Up to The Night" – Bonnie Raitt
- "The Last Place God Made" – Peter Cetera
- "You Made It Beautiful" – Oak Ridge Boys
- "You Make It Beautiful" - Cheryl Ladd & Frankie Valli (duet)
- "In the Real World" – Roy Orbison
- "You May Feel Me Crying" – Roy Orbison
- "We're Playing Games Again" – Tanya Tucker
- "What Do You Do with the Love" – Johnny Mathis
- "This One's For Me" – Herb Alpert
- "You Will Never Know" – Cliff Richard, Cliff DeYoung
- "A Fool's Affair"- Laura Branigan, Melissa Manchester, Glenn Medeiros, Millie Jackson
- "Making the Best of a Bad Situation" – Millie Jackson
- "Is It So Wrong" – The Righteous Brothers, De Blanc, Jimmy Helms
- "As Long As There's Laughter" – Gene Cotton
- "Young Lover" – Gene Cotton
- "Songs I Sing" – Nigel Olsson, Jimmy Helms
- "Love, What Took You So Long" – Mary MacGregor
- "No One Cries Anymore" – Michael Ball
- "Holland Park" – Michael Ball
- "It's Still You" – Michael Ball
- "Whatever It Takes" – Michael Ball
- "We Break Our Own Hearts" – Michael Ball
- "This Is Your Captain Calling" – Colin Blunstone, Bo Donaldson and the Heywoods
- "I'll Never Forget You" – Colin Blunstone
- "I Can't Let Go of You" – Jim Photoglo
- "It's Not the Same Old You" – Johnny Rodriguez
- "More Than That" – Vicky Leandros, Jimmy Helms
- "Blue Skies Forever" – Frankie Miller
- "Silver and Gold" – Terry Sylvester
- "The World Is Going To Be a Better Place" – Edwin Hawkins Singers, Friendship
- "A Million Hearts" – Friendship
- "I Am What I Am" – Lois Fletcher
- "I'm Dreaming" – Andrea Marcovicci
- "Shine On" – Benjy Myaz
- "That's Alright By Me" – Sylvia McNeill
