= Harriet Schock =

American singer

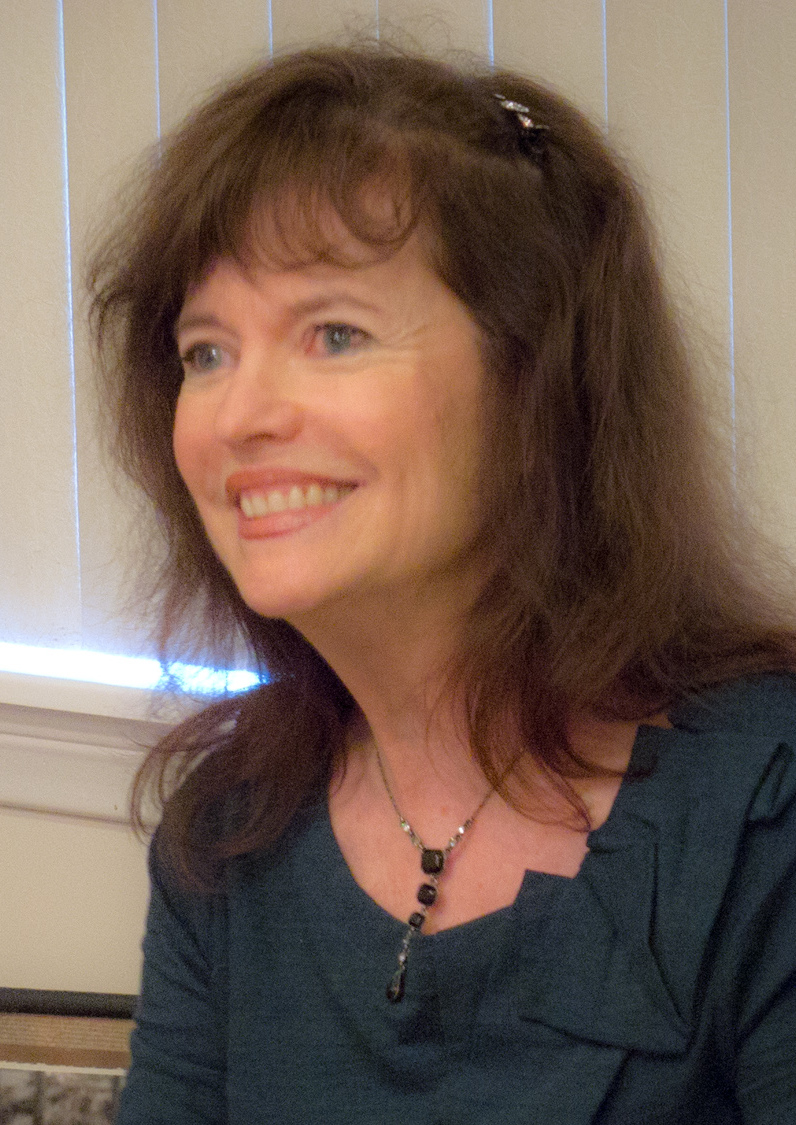
- Schock in 2012

Background information
- Born: Harriet Schoch; January 24, 1941 (age 85); Dallas, Texas, U.S.
- Genre: Pop
- Occupations: Singer, songwriter
- Years active: 1973–present
- Labels: 20th Century Records; Evening Star; Future Schock
- Website: harrietshock.com

Harriet Schock (born January 24, 1941) is an American singer and songwriter. She made three albums for a major label in the 1970s, scoring gold and platinum awards for her Grammy-nominated "Ain't No Way to Treat a Lady". She later moved into teaching and soundtrack work. In the 1990s, she resumed her recording career.

== Biography ==
=== Early years ===
Harriet Schock – née Schoch – was born in Dallas, Texas and raised in North Dallas, one of the two children of dermatologist Arthur Schoch and his wife the former Elizabeth Lubbes. The couple also have an older daughter, Sandra. Schock was taught by her father to play the piano by ear at age 4, then formally studied the piano throughout her school years. She wrote her first song in the seventh grade, and went on to write music for skits performed at her high school. She attended the Hockaday School, graduating in 1958. While earning her BA in English from UT Austin, Schock wrote songs for campus shows. After completing her BA in 1962, Schock worked as a copywriter, first in Dallas and then in Los Angeles. In the middle of the 1960s, she married Dallas-based actor Warren Hammack, and the two later relocated to Los Angeles.

=== Music ===
Schock had intended to use her university background as a dramatist, but after moving to Los Angeles she began to perform her original compositions at local clubs. At a songwriting workshop sponsored by ASCAP, Schock met Roger Gordon of the publishing arm of Colgems Records. After Gordon scouted one of her club gigs, she was signed as a songwriter to Colgems. At this point she left her final copywriting job. According to Schock, she wrote her first two albums by composing songs over the weekends and then taking her songs in to Colgems the following Monday. Her first recorded composition: "That's the Way It is With You", was recorded for the Partridge Family album Bulletin Board which was released in 1973. That same year Schock's divorce from Hammack was finalized.

She was scouted by 20th Century Records at the Ice House in Pasadena, after her inaugural recording deal with Columbia Records fell through. She signed with 20th Century Records in 1974, and went on to record three albums for the label: Hollywood Town, She's Low Clouds (both 1974), and You Don't Know What You're In For (1976). She was named as Cashbox's Best New Female Artist two times. Her songwriting expertise was reviewed in 1977 by Roger Cromelin of the Los Angeles Times: "Schock offers a sort of applied feminism [via] lyrics which [without] rhetoric...cut to the heart of contemporary fears and uncertainties. She deals primarily in the area of love relationships...with a gratifying openness, vulnerability and integrity. Schock's solid, melodic pop music is efficient but not mechanical [with] strong choruses and assured dynamic variations."

In 1975, Helen Reddy scored a No. 8 Billboard Hot 100 with a Schock composition: "Ain't No Way to Treat a Lady". Reddy's success alerted several other artists to the potential of Schock's compositions, which then appeared on albums by Charlene, Roberta Flack, Howard Johnson, Jeannie Kendall, Abbe Lane, Manfred Mann's Earth Band, Johnny Mathis, and Snuff.

Apart from "Ain't No Way to Treat a Lady", Schock's most high-profile composition is "First Time On A Ferris Wheel". She wrote the lyrics after hearing the tune written by Misha Segal. The song was composed during Schock's tenure as a staff writer for Motown Records publishing firm Jobete. "First Time on a Ferris Wheel" was written after Motown president Berry Gordy had assigned Schock and Segal to compose a song for the soundtrack of the upcoming TriStar Pictures release The Last Dragon which Gordy was co-producing. Smokey Robinson and Syreeta were heard singing "First Time on a Ferris Wheel" when the film was released in 1985. Schock recalled that when she and Segal brought a demo of the song to Gordy's home "he [initially] said [the film] didn't need a love song [but once] he [had] heard it [he] called the head of TriStar Pictures at 3 am and told him they were reshooting the end of the film [to accommodate] the song." "First Time on a Ferris Wheel" became a signature tune for Carl Anderson, the singer of the demo played for Berry Gordy. Besides recording "First Time on a Ferris Wheel" as a duet with Gloria Loring for his eponymous 1986 album for Epic Records, Anderson performed the song with Nancy Wilson at Wilson's Carnegie Hall concert of June 25, 1987, which was taped as the 1990 video release Nancy Wilson at Carnegie Hall. The song was also recorded by Rebecca Parris for her 1993 album Spring, and as a solo track by Nancy Wilson for her 1994 album Love, Nancy. According to Schock, "First Time on a Ferris Wheel" had been sung by more than 35 singers.

Schock resumed her own recording career with two albums produced by Nik Venet – American Romance (1995) and Rosebud (1999). In 2010, she released her seventh album, Breakdown on Memory Lane.

She taught songwriting at the University of Southern California from 1986 to 1988, after which, she moved into private tuition. In the late 1990s, her songwriting manual, Becoming Remarkable, was published by Blue Dolphin.

=== Film and television music ===
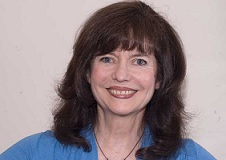
Schock in 2010

Schock has written songs for film and television since the 1970s. Among the films are Delta Force 2: The Colombian Connection, The Last Dragon and The New Adventures of Pippi Longstocking. Television shows include The Partridge Family, The Benny Hill Show and the Jane Seymour TV movie Matters of the Heart.

Schock wrote the theme song for the PBS series Jakers! The Adventures of Piggley Winks, and then provided music for the Henry Jaglom films Going Shopping, Hollywood Dreams (2006), and Irene in Time (2009).

Schock sang a song titled "The Calling" over the opening and closing credits of the 1983 comedy/parody film Hysterical. Part of the song is heard over the opening credits; the full song is heard over the closing credits.

=== Acting ===
Schock appeared with her band in Henry Jaglom's Irene in Time (2009).

In 2009 and 2010, Schock took a role in the Henry Jaglom play Just 45 Minutes from Broadway and also appeared in the 2012 film version.

=== Personal life ===
Schock is a Scientologist, and has reached Operating Thetan VIII, the highest level.

== Discography ==
=== Albums ===
- Hollywood Town (20th Century, T-437, 1974)

Produced by Roger Gordon

- She's Low Clouds (20th Century, T-460, 1974)

Produced by Roger Gordon

- You Don't Know What You're in For (20th Century, T-499, 1976)

Produced by Gene Page and Billy Page. Arranged by Gene Page.

- American Romance (Future Schock, FSD-19201-2, 1992)

Produced by Nik Venet

- Rosebud (Evening Star, E*SRNKV 2002, 1997)

Produced by Nik Venet

- Live – from Fairfax to Pasadena (Thunder Digital, TDD-10107-2, 2001)

Produced by Phil Appelbaum

- Breakdown On Memory Lane (Future Schock, 2010)

Produced by Travis Allen

- Paintings (Future Schock, 2024)

Produced by Edward Auslender and Jefferson Harman

== Bibliography ==
- Becoming Remarkable: For Songwriters and Those Who Love Songs, Blue Dolphin 1999 ISBN 978-1-57733-034-9
