= Angie Baby =

1974 song written by Alan O'Day

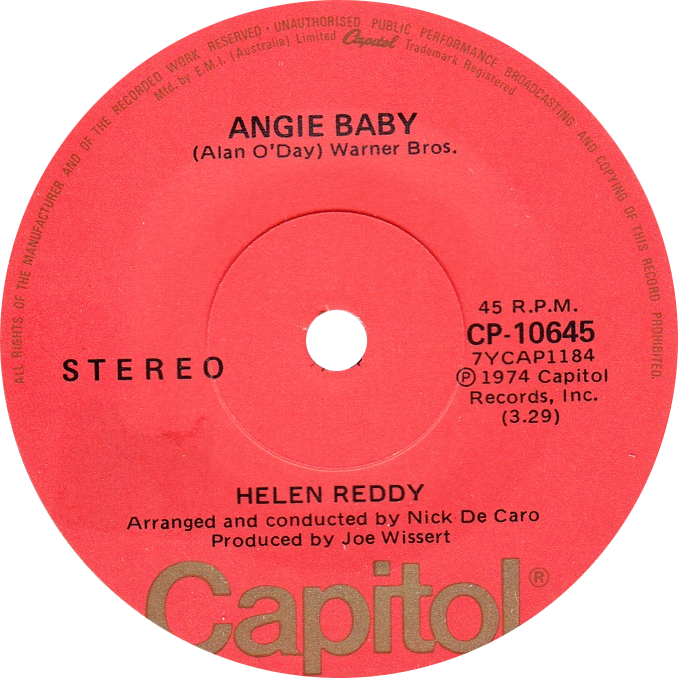
- Side A of the Australian single

Single by Helen Reddy

from the album Free and Easy
- B-side: "I Think I'll Write a Song"
- Released: 1974
- Genre: R&B; psychedelic pop; soft rock
- Length: 3:29
- Label: Capitol
- Songwriter: Alan O'Day
- Producer: Joe Wissert

Helen Reddy singles chronology
"You and Me Against the World" (1974)	"Angie Baby" (1974)	"Emotion" (1974)

"Angie Baby" is a song written by American singer-songwriter Alan O'Day which became a hit for Australian singer Helen Reddy. The song reached #1 on the U.S. Billboard Hot 100 chart December 28, 1974, and became one of Reddy's biggest-selling singles. The song also topped the U.S. adult contemporary chart, Reddy's fifth #1 on this chart.

The song's cryptic lyrics have inspired a number of listener theories as to what the song is really about. Reddy never said what her interpretation of the storyline was, partly because she said she enjoyed hearing listeners' interpretations. Reddy also said that "Angie Baby" was the one song she never had to push radio stations into playing.

== Lyrics story ==
The song tells the story of Angie, a teenage girl who "lives [her] life in the songs" she hears on "rock and roll radio," her mental disturbances leading to her being removed from school and having no friends. She then spends most of her time listening to the radio, imagining lovers entering her room and then disappearing when her father knocks on the door. One day, a neighbor arrives at Angie's house with intent to seduce her, but once he enters Angie's room he is disoriented by the loud music. The song then turns surreal when, as Angie turns the volume of the radio down, the boy begins to shrink and is pulled into the radio. The closing verse describes the disappearance of the boy and the townsfolk's speculation that he was dead, but nobody asks Angie for an explanation; the lyrics imply that the boy has become her "secret lover."

Though not an official video, John D. Wilson of Fine Arts Films made an accompanying animated short film for the song when it appeared on The Midnight Special (broadcast October 31, 1975), as well as on The Sonny & Cher Show in the mid-1970s (Wilson made many other animated shorts for various hit records of the era and his work became a prominent regular feature of the show). The film does not feature Reddy herself but is a literal interpretation of the song's lyrics.

== Background ==
In an article he wrote in 2006, Alan O'Day said the song took three months to write. Originally it was loosely based on the character in the Beatles' "Lady Madonna". In order to make the character more interesting, O'Day decided to make her abnormal, and he thought of a young next door neighbor girl he had known who had seemed "socially retarded". O'Day said he also thought of his own childhood. As an only child who was often ill, many of his days were spent in bed with a radio to keep him company. He named the character Angie, possibly inspired by the Rolling Stones' 1973 hit song "Angie".

Originally the character was portrayed as mentally "slow", but while writing the song, O'Day showed it to his therapist, who pointed out that the character's reactions in the song were not those of a mentally disabled person, so O'Day changed the lyric from "slow" to "touched," and the character's image changed from being mentally disabled to being "crazy". This expanded to her living in a dream world of lovers, inspired by the songs on her radio. When a "neighbor boy with evil on his mind" tries to enter her room to take advantage of the girl, he is instead drawn into her reality, with weird and unexpected consequences. The intent was to show that the Angie character had more power than he or the listener expected; she shrank him down into her radio, where he remained as her slave whenever she desired him to come out.

== Interpretation of lyrics ==
O'Day's lyrics inspired a great deal of speculation about their meaning. The song was compared to Bobbie Gentry’s "Ode to Billie Joe" (which had a mystery about "something" thrown off the Tallahatchie Bridge). Some also thought of it as a "Women's Lib" song along the line of Reddy's other hits, like her other #1's, "I Am Woman" and "Delta Dawn", though O'Day says that that was not his intent, and that he was not consciously making a public statement.

O'Day revealed in 1998 that the "crazy" heroine in the song had "magic power" and "special abilities", and that he had deliberately blurred the lines between fantasy and reality. Reddy joked that the boy had become "a sound wave", an explanation that O'Day later denied.

== Recording history ==
Jeff Wald, who at the time was Reddy's husband and manager, would recall being bowled over upon first hearing the demo of "Angie Baby": "I heard 'Angie...' at 11 am...By noon, Helen had heard it. By three, we were beginning to put an arrangement together. Eight days later it was on the street. Her biggest hit. It had story, melody, everything."

"Angie Baby" became Helen Reddy's first charting single in the British Isles reaching #5 in both the UK and Ireland in February 1975; Reddy would chart again once in both nations with "I Can't Say Goodbye to You" - (#43 UK/ #16 Ireland) - in 1981. "Angie Baby" was also Reddy's final major hit in her native Australia at #13 while affording Reddy her sole charting single in Italy at #36.

== Charts ==
=== Weekly charts ===
Chart (1974–1975)	Peak position
Australia (Kent Music Report)	13
Canada RPM Adult Contemporary	1
Canada RPM Top Singles	3
Ireland (IRMA)	5
New Zealand (Listener)	8
UK (OCC)	5
US Billboard Hot 100	1
US Billboard Easy Listening	1
US Cash Box Top 100	1

=== Year-end charts ===
Chart (1974)	Rank
Canada	128
US Cash Box Top 100	68

Chart (1975)	Rank
Australia (Kent Music Report)	67
Canada	52
US Billboard Hot 100	27

== Later uses ==
The song was also featured as the sole Helen Reddy track as part of a promotional-only compilation album issued by Capitol Records entitled "The Greatest Music Ever Sold" (Capitol SPRO-8511/8512), which was distributed to record stores during the 1976 Holiday season as part of Capitol's "Greatest Music Ever Sold" campaign, promoting 15 "Best Of" albums that were released by the record label.
