= Ain't No Way to Treat a Lady =

Song covered by Helen Reddy in 1975

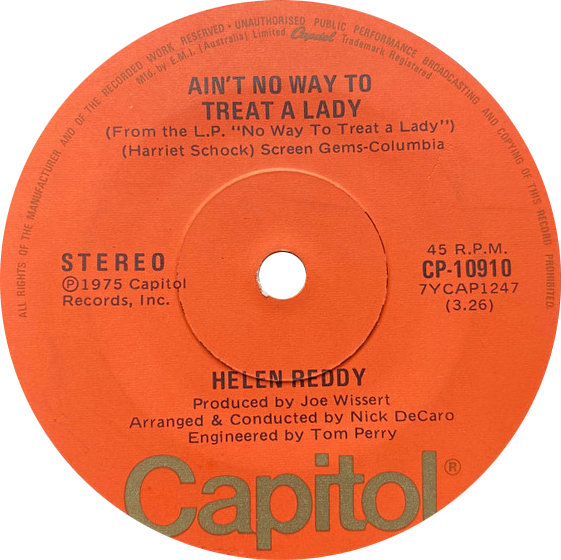

Single by Helen Reddy

from the album No Way to Treat a Lady
- B-side: "Long Time Looking"
- Released: August 1975
- Genre: Easy listening
- Length: 3:26
- Label: Capitol
- Songwriter: Harriet Schock
- Producer: Joe Wissert

Helen Reddy singles chronology
"Bluebird" (1975)	"Ain't No Way to Treat a Lady" (1975)	"Somewhere in the Night" (1976)

"Ain't No Way to Treat a Lady" is a 1974 song written and first recorded by American singer-songwriter Harriet Schock. It was covered by various other artists, and saw its greatest success when it was covered by Helen Reddy, whose 1975 rendition became a top 10 hit.

== Writing and early versions ==
The Los Angeles Times on feminism in Harriet Schock's lyrics
"Schock [in her oeuvre] offers a sort of applied feminism [via] lyrics which [without] rhetoric...cut to the heart of contemporary fears & uncertainties. She deals primarily in the area of love relationships...with a gratifying openness, vulnerability & integrity."

An apparent farewell to a self-absorbed lover, "Ain't No Way to Treat a Lady" was written by Harriet Schock, who recalled writing the song while in the process of "leaving someone for... one of the last times I left him for the last time". The song's title and first verse lyrics occurred to Schock while she was flying home from a Las Vegas vacation and she jotted them down on a napkin. The lyrics and melody were ultimately completed at Schock's Los Angeles home.

Schock included the song on her 1974 album Hollywood Town, and it was issued as a single in the summer of 1974. Schock recalled that a music director of a key Top 40 station in Los Angeles indicated that he would playlist the track if it had a more uptempo arrangement. A customized remix of the track was sent on a Friday to both the Los Angeles station and a San Francisco station, both of which purportedly aired the track on Monday. However, according to Schock, on Sunday the music director in Los Angeles had a fight with the station's director and left his job, and any interest that station - and also the one in San Francisco - had in Schock's single evidently departed with him.

"Ain't No Way to Treat a Lady" also had a single release - concurrent with that of Schock's version - as recorded by the studio group LAX, and was recorded by Vikki Carr for her 1974 album One Hell of a Woman.

== Helen Reddy version ==
=== Overview ===
Helen Reddy recorded "Ain't No Way to Treat a Lady" for her August 1975 Capitol Records album No Way to Treat a Lady. According to Schock, Reddy had heard the composer's version either as inflight music or on the radio. Although the choice for advance single release (in mid-June) from No Way to Treat a Lady went to the Leon Russell composition "Bluebird" - which would swiftly ascend into the Top 40 on the Billboard Hot 100 - Capitol Records were moved to rush release a single release of "Ain't No Way to Treat a Lady" parallel with the release of its parent album, leaving "Bluebird" to stall at No.35, becoming the least successful lead single from a Helen Reddy album since "No Sad Song", from Reddy's second album Helen Reddy, which hit No.62 in 1972.

"Ain't No Way to Treat a Lady" afforded Reddy a sixth and final top ten hit on Billboard's Hot 100 and - on 4 October 1975 - became the seventh of her eight singles to reach No.1 on the magazine's Easy Listening chart. On the Canadian hit parade as ranked by RPM, "Ain't No Way to Treat a Lady" rose to No.2, making it Reddy's highest charting Canadian hit after "I am Woman" and "Delta Dawn", both of which reached the No.1 position on the RPM chart. ("Ain't No Way to Treat a Lady" was kept from first by "Third Rate Romance" by the Amazing Rhythm Aces and then by "I'm Sorry" by John Denver). "Ain't No Way to Treat a Lady" was also a hit (No.12) in New Zealand, and became Reddy's final chart item in her native Australia at No.94.

==== Chart performance ====
===== Weekly charts =====
Chart (1975)	Peak position
Australia	94
Canada RPM Top Singles	2
Canadian RPM Adult Contemporary	2
New Zealand Singles Chart	12
U.S. Billboard Hot 100	8
U.S. Billboard Easy Listening	1
U.S. Cash Box Top 100	5

===== Year-end charts =====
Chart (1975)	Rank
Canada RPM Top Singles	62
Canada RPM Adult Contemporary	21
U.S. Billboard Hot 100	89
U.S. Cash Box	56

=== Harriet Schock's perspective ===
Composer Harriet Schock has suggested that while her intent in writing "Ain't No Way to Treat a Lady" was to reference a specific personal experience, the song has come to be seen as a statement of how women are generally treated by men "because it was a hit by [Helen Reddy], the same artist who spoke so widely for all women in 'I Am Woman'...[and] apparently other women wanted to say [what Schock's song says] to someone. I received a number of calls from women telling me it was just the kick they needed to get that divorce."

=== Later releases ===
"Ain't No Way to Treat a Lady" as performed live at the London Palladium in May 1978 may be heard on the 1978 Helen Reddy concert album release Live in London, the song being one of eleven performed as a medley.

In 2005, Raven Records Australia reissued the song as a two-fer with "One Way Ticket" included as a bonus track.

== Other versions ==
A disco version of "Ain't No Way to Treat a Lady" was recorded by Gonzalez and issued as the followup to their 1979 hit "Haven't Stopped Dancin' Yet" but it was not a success. The song has also been recorded by Singaporean singer Anita Sarawak and – in IsiXhosa – by South African singer Letta Mbulu. A Finnish rendition of the song, "Sä Tunnet Mun", was recorded by Eija Merilä (fi), while the French rendition "Je Veux T'aimer Comme Une Femme" was recorded by Mireille Mathieu. The song also appeared on Bonnie Tyler's 2013 album The Collection.

== See also ==
- List of number-one adult contemporary singles of 1975 (U.S.)
