= Joe Wissert =

American record producer

- Born: Philadelphia, Pennsylvania, U.S.
- Genres: Pop; soul; rock; R&B; funk
- Occupations: Songwriter; record producer

Joe Wissert (born c. 1942 in Philadelphia, Pennsylvania) is an American record producer. Wissert has worked with artists such as Earth, Wind & Fire, Boz Scaggs, Helen Reddy, The Lovin' Spoonful, Gordon Lightfoot and The Turtles.

== Overview ==
Wissert was born and raised in Philadelphia, Pennsylvania. He graduated from Bishop Neuman High School. At the age of 15 he started his career in the music business by getting a job at a record company called Cameo Parkway. A year later he started producing albums though in an uncredited manner. During 1964 he left Cameo Parkway, moving to New York. He later worked as a producer with Warner Bros. Records. Wissert eventually produced Gordon Lightfoot on his 1970 LP Sit Down Young Stranger and his 1971 album Summer Side of Life. Wissert also worked with the band Earth, Wind & Fire, producing their 1971 self-titled debut LP and their 1971 follow-up album The Need of Love. Wissert then produced 1972's Last Days and Time and 1973's Head to the Sky. He also produced along with EWF leader Maurice White on the band's 1974 album Open Our Eyes, and Janis Ian’s self-titled 1978 album.

Wissert later produced Helen Reddy on her 1976 album Music, Music. He also produced Boz Scaggs on his 1976 album Silk Degrees and his 1977 LP Down Two Then Left. During his career he has also worked with artists such as The J. Geils Band, The Lovin' Spoonful and The Turtles and Gang Gajang.

== Personal life ==
Wissert migrated from the US to Australia in 1986 but has since returned to the U.S. and is now living in Santa Monica, CA.

== Accolades ==
=== Grammy Awards ===
The Grammy Awards are awarded annually by the National Academy of Recording Arts and Sciences of the United States.

| Year | Nominee / work | Award | Result |
|---|---|---|---|
| 1976 | Silk Degrees | Album of the Year | Nominated |
| 1976 | "Joe Wissert" | Producer of the Year | Nominated |
