= The Woman I Am: The Definitive Collection =

Compilation album by Helen Reddy
- Released: 2006
- Recorded: 1971–1998
- Length: 71:55
- Label: Capitol
- Producers: Tom Catalano; Kim Fowley; Kasha, Lloyd & Curb; Bruce Kimmel; Earle Mankey; Larry Marks; John Palladino; Helen Reddy; Jay Senter; Joe Wissert

Helen Reddy chronology
Absolutely the Best of Helen Reddy (2003)	The Woman I Am: The Definitive Collection (2006)	Rarities from the Capitol Vaults (2009)

Professional ratings
Review scores
Source	Rating
AllMusic	4.5/5 stars

The Woman I Am: The Definitive Collection is a compilation album by Australian-American pop singer Helen Reddy that was released in 2006 by Capitol Records in conjunction with the publication of her autobiography The Woman I Am: A Memoir. Unique to this best-of disc are the live recordings of "The West Wind Circus" and "Mama" from her 1978 concert LP Live in London and the Sunset Boulevard tune "Surrender" from her 1998 album Center Stage.

== Reception ==
In his Allmusic review of this compilation, Rob Theakston says, "Complete with liner notes from Reddy herself, this is quite possibly the most comprehensive collection of her material that a casual fan could possibly ever need, and something which die-hard fans will enjoy having around, if only to have all of her most important works together in one volume."

== Track listing ==
1. "I Don't Know How to Love Him" (Tim Rice, Andrew Lloyd Webber) – 3:15
2. "Crazy Love" (Van Morrison) – 3:16
3. "Best Friend" (Ray Burton, Helen Reddy) – 2:17
4. "I Am Woman" (Burton, Reddy) – 3:24
5. "Peaceful" (Kenny Rankin) – 2:50
6. "Delta Dawn" (Larry Collins, Alex Harvey) – 3:08
7. "Leave Me Alone (Ruby Red Dress)" (Linda Laurie) – 3:26
8. "Keep On Singing" (Bobby Hart, Danny Janssen) – 3:03
9. "You and Me Against the World" (Kenny Ascher, Paul Williams) – 3:08
10. "I Think I'll Write a Song" (Peter Allen, Helen Reddy) – 2:22
11. "Angie Baby" (Alan O'Day) – 3:29
12. "Emotion" (Patti Dahlstrom, Véronique Sanson) – 4:10
13. "Bluebird" (Leon Russell) – 2:46
14. "Ain't No Way to Treat a Lady" (Harriet Schock) – 3:26
15. "Somewhere in the Night" (Will Jennings, Richard Kerr) – 3:31
16. "I Can't Hear You No More" (Gerry Goffin, Carole King) – 2:48
17. "You're My World" (Umberto Bindi, Gino Paoli, Carl Sigman) – 2:45
18. "Candle on the Water" from Pete's Dragon (Joel Hirschhorn, Al Kasha) – 3:10
19. "We'll Sing in the Sunshine" (Gale Garnett) – 3:34
20. "The West Wind Circus" (live) (Adam Miller) – 5:10
21. "Mama" (live) (Harriet Schock) – 4:31
22. "Surrender" from Sunset Boulevard (Don Black, Christopher Hampton, Andrew Lloyd Webber) – 3:46

== Personnel ==
Original albums

- Helen Reddy – vocals
- Tom Catalano – producer (except as noted)
- Kim Fowley – producer ("You're My World", "We'll Sing in the Sunshine")
- Kasha, Lloyd & Curb – producer ("Candle on the Water")
- Earle Mankey – producer ("You're My World")
- Larry Marks – producer ("Best Friend", "Crazy Love", "I Don't Know How to Love Him")
- John Palladino – producer ("Mama", "The West Wind Circus")
- Helen Reddy – producer ("Mama", "The West Wind Circus")
- Jay Senter – producer ("I Am Woman")
- Joe Wissert – producer ("Angie Baby", "Emotion", "I Think I'll Write a Song", "Bluebird", "Ain't No Way to Treat a Lady", "Somewhere in the Night", "I Can't Hear You No More")

Compilation

- Kevin Flaherty – producer
- Peter Borsari – photography
- Gunther – photography
- Douglas Kirkland – cover photo, photography
- Susan Lavoie – art direction
- David McEowen – mastering
- Helen Reddy – track notes
- Steve Silvas – design
- Jordan Sommers – music consultant
- mastered at Capitol Mastering Studios, Hollywood, California
