= Absolutely the Best of Helen Reddy =

Compilation album by Helen Reddy
- Released: 2003
- Recorded: 1971–1978
- Length: 47:47
- Label: Varèse Sarabande
- Producers: Tom Catalano; Kim Fowley; Larry Marks; Jay Senter; Joe Wissert

Helen Reddy chronology
The Best Christmas Ever (2000)	Absolutely the Best of Helen Reddy (2003)	The Woman I Am: The Definitive Collection (2006)

Professional ratings
Review scores
Source	Rating
AllMusic	4/5 stars

Absolutely the Best of Helen Reddy is a compilation album by Australian-American pop singer Helen Reddy that was released in 2003 by Varèse Sarabande and includes both the original and hit single versions of "I Am Woman" in addition to several of her other popular recordings.

== Reception ==
Tim Sendra of AllMusic finds that this compilation "lives up to its title" and "works as a quick and easy entry into her body of work."

== Track listing ==
1. "I Am Woman" (hit single version) (Ray Burton, Helen Reddy) – 3:24
2. "Delta Dawn" (Larry Collins, Alex Harvey) – 3:08
3. "Angie Baby" (Alan O'Day) – 3:29
4. "Leave Me Alone (Ruby Red Dress)" (Linda Laurie) – 3:26
5. "Ain't No Way to Treat a Lady" (Harriet Schock) – 3:26
6. "You and Me Against the World" (Kenny Ascher, Paul Williams) – 3:08
7. "I Don't Know How to Love Him" (Tim Rice, Andrew Lloyd Webber) – 3:15
8. "Peaceful" (Kenny Rankin) – 2:50
9. "I Can't Hear You No More" (Gerry Goffin, Carole King) – 2:48
10. "We'll Sing in the Sunshine" (Gale Garnett) – 3:34
11. "This Masquerade" (Leon Russell) – 3:35
12. "Get Off Me Baby" (Jeff Langley, Holly Near) – 4:58
13. "The West Wind Circus" (Adam Miller) – 4:25
14. "I Am Woman" (original version) (Ray Burton, Helen Reddy) – 2:15

== Personnel ==
- Helen Reddy – vocals
- Tom Catalano – producer (except as noted)
- Kim Fowley – producer ("We'll Sing in the Sunshine")
- Larry Marks – producer (" I Am Woman" (original version), "I Don't Know How to Love Him")
- Jay Senter – producer ("I Am Woman" (hit single version))
- Joe Wissert – producer ("Angie Baby", "Ain't No Way to Treat a Lady", "I Can't Hear You No More", "Get Off Me Baby")
