= Rarities from the Capitol Vaults =

Compilation album by Helen Reddy
- Released: 21 July 2009
- Recorded: 1971–1980
- Length: 42:49
- Label: EMI Music Special Markets
- Producers: Tom Catalano; Frank Day; Kim Fowley; Ron Haffkine; Larry Marks; Jay Senter

Helen Reddy chronology
The Woman I Am: The Definitive Collection (2006)	Rarities from the Capitol Vaults (2009)

Professional ratings
Review scores
Source	Rating
AllMusic	3.5/5 stars

Rarities from the Capitol Vaults is a compilation album by Australian-American pop singer Helen Reddy that was released in 2009 by EMI Music Special Markets and boasts 10 previously unreleased songs (tracks 1–10) as well as two lesser-known recordings.

== Reception ==
Stephen Thomas Erlewine of AllMusic writes, "The biggest surprise here is that a fair number of the unreleased songs tend to have a prominent backbeat -- usually some sort of play on disco, but 'Tell Jack' is a pretty terrific slice of Elton John-styled glam rock."

== Track listing ==
1. "I Am Woman" (alternate version) (Ray Burton, Helen Reddy) – 2:24
  - from sessions for the 1971 album I Don't Know How to Love Him
2. "Me and My Love" (Bruce Roberts, Carole Bayer Sager) – 3:28
  - from sessions for the 1978 album We'll Sing in the Sunshine
3. "Together" (Charles Fox, Norman Gimbel) – 3:23
  - from sessions for the 1978 album We'll Sing in the Sunshine
4. "Rhythm Rhapsody" (Ralph Schuckett, John Siegler) – 4:15
  - from sessions for the 1978 album We'll Sing in the Sunshine
5. "Blue" (alternate version) (Joe Raposo) – 4:34
  - from sessions for the 1978 album We'll Sing in the Sunshine
6. "Tell Jack" (Phil Galdston, Peter Thorn) – 4:24
  - no recording information provided
7. "Exhaustion" (Robin Sinclair) – 2:28
  - from sessions for the 1979 album Reddy
8. "Don't Mess with a Woman" (alternate version) (Michael Curtis, Richard Curtis, Patty Moan) – 3:38
  - from the session in which "I Am Woman" was rerecorded for single release
9. "Lullaby" (Helen Reddy, Carole Bayer Sager) – 3:02
  - no recording information provided
10. "Songs" (alternate version) (Barry Mann, Cynthia Weil) – 3:11
  - from sessions for the 1974 album Love Song for Jeffrey
11. "Take What You Find" (extended mix) (Julie Didier, Casey Kelly) – 5:01
  - promotional-only, extended 12" disco edition
12. "Plus de Chansons Tristes (No Sad Song)" (Carole King, Toni Stern) – 3:01
  - English-language version appears on the 1971 album Helen Reddy

== Personnel ==
Original albums

- Helen Reddy – vocals
- Tom Catalano – producer ("Songs")
- Frank Day – producer ("Exhaustion")
- Kim Fowley – producer ("Me and My Love", "Together", "Rhythm Rhapsody", "Blue")
- Ron Haffkine – producer ("Take What You Find")
- Larry Marks – producer ("I Am Woman", "Plus de Chansons Tristes")
- Jay Senter – producer ("Don't Mess with a Woman")

Compilation

- Kevin Flaherty – producer
- Peter Borsari – photography
- Gunther – photography
- Douglas Kirkland – cover photo, photography
- Susan Lavoie – art direction
- David McEowen – mastering
- Helen Reddy – track notes
- Steve Silvas – design
- Jordan Sommers – music consultant
- Jim Pierson – compilation producer
- Matt Tunia – associate producer
- Gordon Anderson – executive producer
- mastered at Capitol Mastering Studios, Hollywood, California
