= Long Hard Climb =

Studio album by Helen Reddy
- Released: 23 July 1973
- Recorded: 1973
- Length: 29:28
- Label: Capitol
- Producer: Tom Catalano

Helen Reddy chronology
I Am Woman (1972)	Long Hard Climb (1973)	Love Song for Jeffrey (1974)

Singles from Long Hard Climb
- 1. "Delta Dawn" Released: 11 June 1973; 2. "Leave Me Alone (Ruby Red Dress)" Released: 29 October 1973

Professional ratings
Review scores
Source	Rating
AllMusic	4/5 stars
Christgau's Record Guide	C

Long Hard Climb is the fourth studio album by Australian-American pop singer Helen Reddy, released on 23 July 1973 by Capitol Records and, aside from its primary focus on Top 40-friendly material, had her trying out New Orleans jazz ("Lovin' You") and the English-language version of a recent Charles Aznavour standard ("The Old Fashioned Way"). It debuted on Billboard's Top LP's & Tapes chart in the issue dated 11 August 1973, and reached number eight during its 43 weeks there, and in Canada's RPM magazine it peaked at number 14. On September 19 of that year, the Recording Industry Association of America awarded the album with Gold certification for sales of 500,000 copies in the United States. On 22 July 2003, it was released for the first time on compact disc as one of two albums on one CD, the other album being her 1972 release I Am Woman.

== Singles ==
"Delta Dawn" was released as the first single from the album on 11 June 1973, debuted on Billboard's Hot 100 later that month, in the issue of the magazine dated 23 June, and enjoyed 20 weeks there, one of which was at number one. That same issue also marked its first appearance on the magazine's Easy Listening chart, where it lasted for 16 weeks, with two of those being in the top spot. On 30 August of that year the song earned Gold certification from the RIAA for sales of the one million copies that was the requirement for singles at that time. It also had three weeks at number one on RPM's singles chart in Canada. The single was certified Gold in Australia in March 1974.

"Leave Me Alone (Ruby Red Dress)" was released as a single on 29 October of that year and had 16 weeks on the pop chart that began in the 3 November issue and eventually included two weeks at number three. It also spent 16 weeks on the Easy Listening chart that started in the 10 November issue and included four weeks at number one. On 8 January 1974, it received Gold certification, and it peaked at number five in Canada in the issue of RPM dated 12 January.

== Track listing ==
Side 1

1. "Leave Me Alone (Ruby Red Dress)" (Linda Laurie) – 3:26
2. "Lovin' You" (John Sebastian) – 2:49
3. "A Bit O.K." (Peter Allen, Carole Bayer Sager) – 2:07
4. "Don't Mess with a Woman" (Michael Curtis, Richard Curtis, Patty Moan) – 3:04
5. "Delta Dawn" (Larry Collins, Alex Harvey) – 3:08

Side 2

1. "The West Wind Circus" (Adam Miller) – 4:25
2. "If We Could Still Be Friends" (Paul Williams) – 2:17
3. "Long Hard Climb" (Ron Davies) – 2:59
4. "Until It's Time for You to Go" (Buffy Sainte-Marie) – 2:17
5. "The Old Fashioned Way" (Georges Garvarentz, Joel Hirschhorn, Al Kasha) – 2:56

Alternate version of "Don't Mess with a Woman"

In 2009 EMI Music Special Markets released Rarities from the Capitol Vaults, a 12-track CD of mostly what were previously unreleased Reddy recordings, which included an alternate version of "Don't Mess with a Woman".

== Personnel ==
- Helen Reddy – vocals
- Tom Catalano – producer (except as noted)
- Al Capps – arranger and conductor ("Leave Me Alone (Ruby Red Dress)", "Delta Dawn", "Long Hard Climb")
- Lee Holdridge – arranger and conductor ("The West Wind Circus", "If We Could Still Be Friends", "The Old Fashioned Way")
- Armin Steiner – engineer
- Jay Senter – producer ("Don't Mess with a Woman")
- Jim Horn – horn arrangements ("Don't Mess with a Woman")
- Doug Sax – cutting engineer
- Jeff Wald – management
- Norman Seeff – photography
- John Hoernle – art direction

== Charts ==
Chart (1973)	Peak position
Australian Albums (Kent Music Report)	16
Canadian Albums (RPM)	14
US Billboard 200	8

== Certifications ==
Region	Certification	Certified units/sales
Australia (ARIA)	Gold	20,000^{^}
New Zealand (RMNZ)	Gold	7,500^{^}
^{^} Shipments figures based on certification alone.
