= Borsari =

Borsari is a surname. Notable people with the surname include:

- Nino Borsari (1911–1996), Italian cyclist
- Peter Borsari (1939–2006), American-Swiss photographer
- Pietro Borsari (1894–1959), Swiss sculptor

== See also ==
- Borsari's sign, dermatological sign
- Porta Borsari, ancient Roman gate in Verona, Italy
