= Absolutely the Best =

Absolutely the Best may refer to:

- Absolutely the Best (Odetta album), 2000
- Absolutely the Best of Helen Reddy, 2003
