= Larry Collins (guitarist) =

American musician, songwriter

- 2016 Collins single cover

Background information
- Born: October 4, 1944; Tulsa, Oklahoma, U.S
- Died: January 5, 2024 (aged 79) Santa Clarita, California, U.S.
- Genres: Rockabilly; country; outlaw country; country rock; rock and roll
- Occupations: Musician; songwriter
- Instrument: Guitar
- Years active: 1954–2024
- Formerly of: The Collins Kids

Lawrence Collins (October 4, 1944 – January 5, 2024) was an American guitarist, best known for being a part of The Collins Kids duo with his sister Lorrie, being mentored by Joe Maphis, and for his fast and energetic playing.

When The Collins Kids initially split up in 1961, Collins continued to perform as a solo artist, and most notably co-wrote the 1972 hit "Delta Dawn".

== The Collins Kids ==
Collins was a member of The Collins Kids, with his sister Lorrie (1942-2018). Their hits in the 1950s included "Hop, Skip and Jump", "Beetle Bug Bop", and "Hoy Hoy". The Collins Kids became regular performers on Town Hall Party in 1954, appeared on the Grand Ole Opry, and on the syndicated for television version of the show, Tex Ritter's Ranch Party in the late 1950s.

Collins and his mentor, country star Joe Maphis, recorded an album together for Columbia Records, titled Fire on the Strings, released in 1957. The Collins siblings continued to perform together until 1961 when they separated. The duo reunited for a rockabilly revival concert in England in 1993 and performed together until Lorrie's death in 2018.

== Later works ==
When he was not a part of The Collins Kids, Collins continued to perform as a solo artist. Collins went on to write and produce hits for many well known country music stars, and is most notable for co-writing the 1972 hit "Delta Dawn" with Alex Harvey and the 1981 country hit "You're the Reason God Made Oklahoma" with Sandy Pinkard.

== Equipment ==
Collins was known for playing a double-neck Mosrite guitar like his mentor, Joe Maphis.

== Personal life and death ==
Lawrence Collins was born in Tulsa, Oklahoma, on October 4, 1944, and died of natural causes in Santa Clarita, California, on January 5, 2024, at the age of 79.
