= Helen Reddy (album) =

Studio album by Helen Reddy
- Released: 8 November 1971
- Recorded: August–September 1971
- Studio: Capitol (Hollywood)
- Length: 33:08
- Label: Capitol
- Producer: Larry Marks

Helen Reddy chronology
I Don't Know How to Love Him (1971)	Helen Reddy (1971)	I Am Woman (1972)

Singles from Helen Reddy
- 1. "No Sad Song" Released: November 1971

Professional ratings
Review scores
Source	Rating
AllMusic	3.5/5 stars
Christgau's Record Guide	A−
Tom Hull – on the Web	B+

Helen Reddy is the second studio album by Australian-American pop singer Helen Reddy, released on 8 November 1971 by Capitol Records. It debuted on Billboard magazine's Top LP's chart in the issue dated 4 December 1971, and had a seven-week chart run in which it peaked at 167.

On 29 March 2005, the album was released for the first time on compact disc as one of two albums on one CD, the other being I Don't Know How to Love Him, Reddy's 1971 debut album.

== Single ==
Billboard's 4 December 1971 issue also marked the first appearance of the single from the album, "No Sad Song", on the magazine's Hot 100, where it spent eight weeks and peaked at number 62, Three weeks later, the song hit the Easy Listening chart, where it reached number 32. It also reached number 51 on the pop chart in Canada's RPM magazine.

== Reception ==
The Village Voice critic Robert Christgau highlighted "a scathing death-of-a-cocksman song that Carole King somehow left off Music, a John Lennon autotherapy that sounds inquisitive instead of foolish, and a frolicsome sisterhood ditty that [Reddy] wrote herself." Joe Viglione of AllMusic retrospectively describes the album as "a pleasant listening experience, though it was the only one of her early albums not to find representation on her Greatest Hits. Because there was no big hit on the record, it is not as well-known as her other recordings, but it definitely has charm and is an essential part of her collection of music."

== Track listing ==
Side 1

1. "Time" (Paul Parrish) – 3:38
2. "How?" (John Lennon) – 3:33
3. "Come on John" (David Blue) – 4:21
4. "Summer of '71" (Jack Conrad, Helen Reddy) – 2:36
5. "I Don't Remember My Childhood" (Leon Russell) – 3:32

Side 2

1. "No Sad Song" (Carole King, Toni Stern) – 3:11
2. "I Think It's Going to Rain Today" (Randy Newman) – 2:27
3. "Tulsa Turnaround" (Larry Collins, Alex Harvey) – 3:24
4. "More Than You Could Take" (Helen Reddy) – 2:41
5. "New Year's Resovolution" (Donovan) – 3:40

In 2009, for the French market, EMI-Capitol Special Markets released Rarities from the Capitol Vaults, a 12-track CD of previously unreleased Reddy recordings, including "Plus De Chansons Tristes", the French version of "No Sad Song".

== Personnel ==
- Guitar: John Brennan, Dennis Budimir, David Cohen, Dean Parks
- Steel guitar: Sneaky Pete Kleinow
- Guitar, mandolin: Larry Carlton
- Bass guitar: Joe Osborn, Jerry Scheff, Leland Sklar
- Keyboards: Nick DeCaro, Craig Doerge, Tom Hensley, Larry Knechtel, Paul Parrish
- Drums: John Guerin, Russ Kunkel, Ron Tutt
- Percussion: Milt Holland

== Charts ==
Chart (1972)	Peak position
US Billboard 200	167
