= I Am Woman (album) =

Studio album by Helen Reddy
- Released: 13 November 1972
- Recorded: April, September–October 1972
- Studios: Sound Labs (Los Angeles); Sunwest (Los Angeles)
- Genre: Pop
- Length: 31:44
- Label: Capitol
- Producers: Tom Catalano, Jay Senter

Helen Reddy chronology
Helen Reddy (1971)	I Am Woman (1972)	Long Hard Climb (1973)

Singles from I Am Woman
- 1. "I Am Woman" Released: 22 May 1972; 2. "Peaceful" Released: 29 January 1973

Professional ratings
Review scores
Source	Rating
AllMusic	4/5 stars
Billboard	positive
Christgau's Record Guide	B

I Am Woman is the third studio album by Australian–American pop singer Helen Reddy, released on 13 November 1972 by Capitol Records. The album included her second recording of the song that gave the album its name, which was also the version that spent a week at number one on the Billboard Hot 100.

The album debuted on the Billboard Top LPs & Tape chart in the issue dated 9 December 1972, and reached number 14 during a 62-week run, It reached number 12 in Cash Box and number 7 on Canada's RPM magazine. On 7 March 1973, the Recording Industry Association of America awarded the album with Gold certification for sales of 500,000 copies in the United States, and Platinum certification for sales of one million copies came on 5 December 1991. On 22 July 2003, it was released for the first time on compact disc as one of two albums on one CD, the other album being her 1973 release Long Hard Climb.

== Background ==
=== Singles ===
The song "I Am Woman" was originally written for and included on Reddy's 1971 debut album, I Don't Know How to Love Him, but, because of its length and arrangement, she thought it "clearly was not hit-single material." When it was selected for use in the 1972 film Stand Up and Be Counted, her record company wanted a longer version to release as a 45 in conjunction with the opening of the film. The new recording of the song, produced by Jay Senter, was done at Sunwest Recording Studio, Los Angeles, California, on 23 April 1972, and was made available on 22 May of that year. Reddy has summarized the response to the song from most disc jockeys that she experienced as, "'I can't stand this record! I hate this song! But you know, it's a funny thing, my wife loves it!'". Her husband-manager Jeff Wald landed her 19 appearances on various television shows where she could perform it, and "women began calling radio stations and requesting the song, thereby forcing airplay." Other tracks, such as "Peaceful", were recorded at recording engineer Armin Steiner's Sound Labs Studio, Los Angeles, California, for Reddy's album, which would be named after her aforementioned single.

It wasn't until almost seven months later, in the 9 December issue of Billboard magazine, that it sat atop the list of the 100 most popular songs in the US, and on 18 December it earned Gold certification for sales of the one million copies that was the requirement for singles at that time. It also spent two weeks at number two on the magazine's Easy Listening chart over the course of the 22 weeks that it was there and three weeks at number one on RPM's list of Canada's top 100 hit songs. A second single, "Peaceful", was released on 29 January 1973, and started a run of 17 weeks on the pop chart in the 3 February issue that eventually took the song to number 12. Its debut on the Easy Listening chart came two weeks later, in the 17 February issue, and, as with the title song, it also enjoyed two weeks at number two there. In RPM it also reached number 12 pop.

== Reception ==
Billboard's reviewer wrote that "the powerful stylist offers by far her finest package, artistically and commercially." Charles Donovan of AllMusic retrospectively noted that, except for the cover of 'Hit the Road Jack', the album was "a fine collection of light pop and ballads" and that the second single was "everything easy listening should be: undemanding, sweet and flawlessly produced."

=== Grammy Award ===
In Thomas O'Neil's book The Grammys: The Ultimate, Unofficial Guide to Music's Highest Honor, O'Neil writes, "The most famous acceptance speech in the history of the Grammys was given [in 1973] by Helen Reddy when she picked up the trophy for Best Pop Vocal Performance, Female for 'I Am Woman'." Reddy concluded her speech by thanking "'God because She makes everything possible,'" and "was flooded with protest letters from religious fundamentalists" afterwards.

== Track listing ==
Side one

1. "Peaceful" (Kenny Rankin) – 2:50
2. "I Am Woman" (Ray Burton, Helen Reddy) – 3:24
3. "This Masquerade" (Leon Russell) – 3:35
4. "I Didn't Mean to Love You" (Artie Butler, Karen Philipp) – 4:00
5. "Where Is My Friend" (Daniel Meehan, Bobby Scott) – 3:10

Side two

1. "And I Love You So" (Don McLean) – 4:00
2. "What Would They Say" (Paul Williams) – 2:45
3. "Where Is the Love" (Ralph MacDonald, William Salter) – 3:01
4. "Hit the Road Jack" (Percy Mayfield) – 2:18
5. "The Last Blues Song" (Barry Mann, Cynthia Weil) – 2:41

== Recording dates ==
From the liner notes for the 2020 CD I Am Woman/Long Hard Climb:

- 23 April 1972 – "I Am Woman"
- 20 September 1972 – "This Masquerade", "Where Is My Friend", "And I Love You So", "Where Is the Love"
- 9 October 1972 – "Peaceful", "I Didn't Mean to Love You", "What Would They Say"
- 10 October 1972 – "Hit the Road, Jack", "The Last Blues Song"

== Personnel ==
=== Musicians ===
Personnel per the Melbourne Sunday Herald Sun and Capitol Records.

All tracks except I Am Woman

- Helen Reddy – vocals
- Artie Butler – arranger and conductor

I Am Woman

- Helen Reddy – vocals
- Mike Deasy – guitars
- Jim Gordon – drums
- Mike Melvoin – piano
- Leland Sklar – bass
- Dick Hyde – trombone, string and horn arrangements
- Don Menza – saxophone
- Kathy Deasy – backing vocals

=== Production ===
- Tom Catalano – producer (except as noted)
- Armin Steiner – engineer (except as noted)
- Jay Senter – producer on "I Am Woman"
- Buck Herring – engineer on "I Am Woman"
- Jeff Wald – management

== Charts ==
Chart (1972–73)	Peak position
Australian Albums (Kent Music Report)	10
Canadian Albums (RPM)	7
US Billboard 200	14

== Certifications ==
Region	Certification	Certified units/sales
Australia (ARIA)	Gold	20,000^{^}
New Zealand (RMNZ)	Gold	7,500^{^}
United States (RIAA)	Platinum	1,000,000^{^}
^{^} Shipments figures based on certification alone.
