= Lorrie Collins =

American country singer-songwriter (1942–2018)

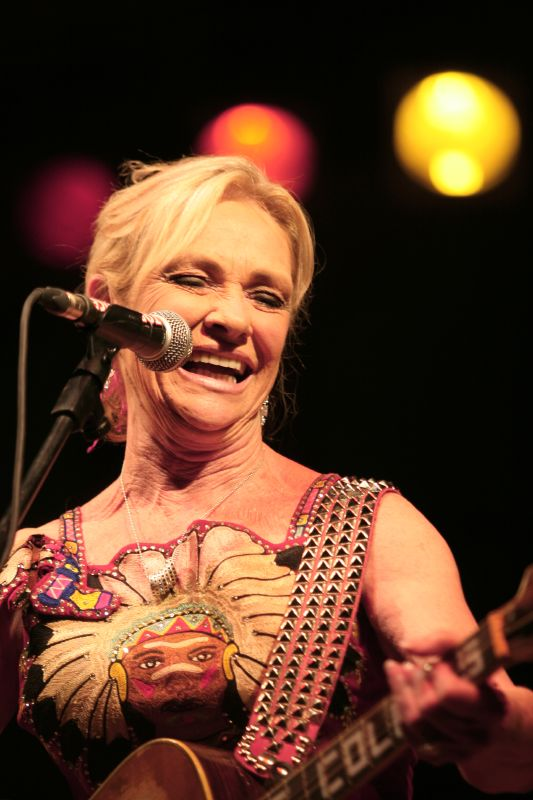
- Collins performing in August 2006

Background information
- Birth name: Lawrencine May Collins
- Born: May 7, 1942; Near Sapulpa, Oklahoma, U.S.
- Died: August 4, 2018 (aged 76); Reno, Nevada, U.S.
- Genres: Country; rockabilly; rock
- Instrument: Guitar
- Years active: 1952–2018
- Formerly of: The Collins Kids

Lawrencine May "Lorrie" Collins (May 7, 1942 – August 4, 2018) was an American country, rockabilly and rock and roll singer. Beginning in the mid-1950s, she and her brother, Larry Collins, performed as the Collins Kids.

== Early life ==
Born in Creek County, Oklahoma, near Sapulpa, Collins and her brother Larry were individually musically talented as young children. Their parents relocated them to Southern California to develop their music. They soon became paired as a musical duo.

== Career ==
In the late 1950s, Collins was the girlfriend of television star and teen idol Ricky Nelson on both the Nelson family's top-rated show The Adventures of Ozzie & Harriet and in private life. She made her debut on January 22, 1958, in an episode titled "The Picture in Rick's Notebook" in which she played the dual role of sisters (the older one being David Nelson's; the younger sister, not yet even in high school, being Ricky's potential paramour). In this first episode, Nelson and Lorrie performed a duet of "Just Because", which had been one of the Collins Kids' signature songs (Lorrie played her own guitar and covered the name Collins on the neck with her left hand). A month later, her brother made a guest appearance on the show in an episode titled "Who Is Betty?", which aired on February 19, 1958.

In 1959, when Collins was 17, she married Stu Carnall, who was Johnny Cash's manager and twice her age. She continued acting and singing with Nelson on television and recording and touring with her brother until 1961 when she gave birth to her first child. The Collins duo continued to perform into the 1960s, appearing as regulars in the 1963 Canadian music series Star Route, and later made appearances on The Jackie Gleason Show and The Hollywood Palace as late as 1967. Many of their performances on Town Hall Party were released on DVD by Bear Family Records of Germany; a CD of their work on the show Rockin' on T.V. was released in 1993 on the Krazy Kat label in Europe.

With her brother, Collins is a member of the Rockabilly Hall of Fame.

She and her brother performed together again in 1992 and 1993, mostly at music festivals.

== Death ==
Collins died on August 4, 2018, in Reno, Nevada, from complications of a fall at the age of 76.
