= Borsari's sign =

Dermatologic sign present in scarlet fever

- Differential diagnosis: Scarlet fever

Borsieri's sign or Borsieri's line is a dermatological sign that consists of pressure by a sharp object (such as a fingernail) producing a white line on the skin that quickly turns red. It is present in scarlet fever. It was first described by French physician Giovanni Battista Borsieri de Kanifeld.
