= I Don't Know How to Love Him (album) =

Studio album by Helen Reddy
- Released: 10 May 1971
- Recorded: 4 December 1970 – February–March 1971
- Genre: Pop
- Length: 30:30
- Label: Capitol
- Producer: Larry Marks

Helen Reddy chronology
I Don't Know How to Love Him (1971)	Helen Reddy (1971)

Singles from I Don't Know How to Love Him
- 1. "I Don't Know How to Love Him" Released: 4 January 1971; 2. "Crazy Love" Released: July 1971

Professional ratings
Review scores
Source	Rating
AllMusic	3/5 stars
Christgau's Record Guide	B

I Don't Know How to Love Him is the debut studio album by Australian-American pop singer Helen Reddy, released on 10 May 1971 by Capitol Records. I Don't Know How to Love Him included her first (and lesser known) recording of "I Am Woman". The album made its first appearance on Billboard magazine's Top LP's chart in the issue dated 5 June 1971, and remained there for 37 weeks, peaking at number 100, and got as high as number 40 on the album chart in Canada's RPM magazine. On 27 November 1974, the album received Gold certification from the Recording Industry Association of America, and on 29 March 2005, it was released for the first time on compact disc as one of two albums on one CD, the other album being Reddy's eponymous follow-up that originally came out in the fall of 1971.

== Singles ==
Jeff Wald, Reddy's husband and manager, was persistent in contacting Capitol Records executive Artie Mogull with the hope that he would give his wife her first chance at recording in the US. When Mogull felt inspired to make a hit out of "I Don't Know How to Love Him" from Jesus Christ Superstar in 1970, he finally came around to giving her that chance. Her recording of the song was released on 4 January 1971, and Wald's strategy then became contacting disc jockeys across the country about giving the single airplay. It entered the Billboard Hot 100 the following month, in the issue of the magazine dated February 20, and remained there for 20 weeks, during which time it peaked at number 13 and "encouraged Capitol to produce an album." The title song also went on to reach number 12 on the magazine's list of the 50 most popular Easy Listening records in the US, and number 10 on the pop chart in Canada's RPM magazine. A second single, a cover of Van Morrison's "Crazy Love", made it to number eight Easy Listening and number 51 pop in the US and number 35 in Canada.

== Reception ==
AllMusic's Charles Donovan noted retrospectively that "the moment of triumph here is an early version of 'I Am Woman,' which wasn't to be a success for another couple of years. Even in this restrained, embryonic incarnation, it was an anthem just waiting to happen -- rousing, catchy and timely." Robert Christgau wrote that she "applies a lean pop voice almost devoid of grit or melisma to what are basically rock songs--that is, songs conceived grittily and melismatically."

== Track listing ==
Side 1

1. "Crazy Love" (Van Morrison) – 3:16
2. "How Can I Be Sure" (Eddie Brigati, Felix Cavaliere) – 2:50
3. "Our House" (Graham Nash) – 2:58
4. "I Am Woman" (music: Ray Burton; lyrics: Helen Reddy) – 2:15
5. "L.A. Breakdown" (Larry Marks) – 3:38

Side 2

1. "A Song for You" (Leon Russell) – 3:03
2. "Don't Make Promises" (Tim Hardin) – 3:02
3. "I Believe in Music" (Mac Davis) – 3:14
4. "Best Friend" (Ray Burton, Helen Reddy) – 2:17
5. "I Don't Know How to Love Him" (Tim Rice, Andrew Lloyd Webber) – 3:15

Alternate version of "I Am Woman"

In 2009 EMI Music Special Markets released Rarities from the Capitol Vaults, a 12-track CD of mostly what were previously unreleased Reddy recordings, which included a second arrangement of "I Am Woman" that used the same vocal track that she recorded for the version released on this album. The hit version of the song was released in 1972 as both a 7-inch single and a track on the album of the same name.

Alternate version of "Best Friend"

In 1974, Reddy appeared in the film Airport 1975. In the character of Sister Ruth, Reddy performed a solo acoustic version of "Best Friend" to an ailing passenger, played by Linda Blair.

== Charts ==
Chart (1971)	Peak position
Australia (Kent Music Report)	41
Canada Albums (RPM)	40
US Billboard 200	100

== Personnel ==
- Helen Reddy – vocals
- Larry Marks – producer
- Nick DeCaro – arranger ("I Believe in Music", "I Don't Know How to Love Him")
- Jimmie Haskell – strings and horns ("I Am Woman", "L.A. Breakdown", "How Can I Be Sure")
- Bob Thompson – strings and woodwinds ("Our House", "A Song for You", "Don't Make Promises")
- Lillian Roxon – liner notes
