= Center Stage (Helen Reddy album) =

Studio album by Helen Reddy
- Released: 22 September 1998
- Recorded: 1998
- Studios: Westlake (Los Angeles, California)
- Length: 47:05
- Label: Varèse Sarabande
- Producer: Bruce Kimmel

Helen Reddy chronology
I Am Woman: The Essential Helen Reddy Collection (1998)	Center Stage (1998)	The Best Christmas Ever (2000)

Professional ratings
Review scores
Source	Rating
AllMusic	3/5 stars
Billboard	positive

Center Stage is the sixteenth studio album by Australian-American pop singer Helen Reddy that was released in 1998 by Varèse Sarabande. Reddy describes the album as the perfect melding of two areas of her career: "the recording studio and the theatrical stage. I tried to select songs from various songwriters in different eras. I've also included (of course) a song from each of the musical shows I've performed in."

== Singles ==
The album version of "Surrender" and a longer dance version were released together as a CD single but did not have any appearances on Billboard's Hot 100 or Adult Contemporary charts. Of the album version, Reddy writes, "Andrew Lloyd Webber is very rigid about his songs being sung exactly as written. I gave him his due in the first pass at this song from Sunset Boulevard (originally sung over the body of a dead monkey). However, my need for self-expression found its voice in the second half."

== Reception ==
Joe Viglione of Allmusic described the album as "masterful" and writes, "The song selection is tremendous, and the performance is a milestone for a singer who has already conquered other formats. Center Stage is a delightful treat and will be a considered a classic years down the road, on that you can be sure." Billboard clarifies, "It's not that she has refashioned her vocal approach -- it remains an affecting ballad voice. But it's employed in the interest here of classy, mostly rarely recorded ballads from the world of musical theater." They conclude, "Reddy makes daring choices throughout this album and meets the challenge every time."

== Track listing ==
1. "Blow, Gabriel, Blow" from Anything Goes (Cole Porter) – 3:06
2. "I Still Believe in Love" from They're Playing Our Song (Marvin Hamlisch, Carole Bayer Sager) – 3:04
3. "A Boy Like You" from Street Scene (Langston Hughes, Kurt Weill) – 2:38
4. "The Writing's on the Wall" from Drood (Rupert Holmes) – 2:41
5. "With Every Breath I Take" from City of Angels (Cy Coleman, David Zippel) – 3:25
6. "Knowing When to Leave" from Promises, Promises (Burt Bacharach, Hal David) – 2:10
7. "Love, Look Away" from Flower Drum Song (Oscar Hammerstein II, Richard Rodgers) – 4:02
8. "Surrender" from Sunset Boulevard (Don Black, Christopher Hampton, Andrew Lloyd Webber) – 3:46
9. "You're Just in Love" from Call Me Madam (performed with Richard Hillman) (Irving Berlin) – 4:25
10. "Tell Me It's Not True" from Blood Brothers (Willy Russell) – 4:05
11. "Speak Low" from One Touch of Venus (Ogden Nash, Kurt Weill) – 3:52
12. "My Friend" from The Life (performed with Jessica Williams) (Cy Coleman, Ira Gasman) – 3:26
13. "Fifty Percent" from Ballroom (Alan and Marilyn Bergman, Billy Goldenberg) – 3:26
14. "The Party's Over" from Bells Are Ringing (Betty Comden, Adolph Green, Jule Styne) – 2:59

== Personnel ==
- Helen Reddy – vocals
- Bruce Kimmel – producer
- Ron Abel – arranger and conductor (except as noted)
- Steven Orich – orchestrations (except as noted); music preparation
- Joseph Baker – arranger and orchestrations ("Tell Me It's Not True")
- Vincent Cirilli – engineer
- Michael Parnin – assistant engineer
- Markus Ulibarri – assistant engineer
- Joe Gastwirt – mastering
- Brian Giorgi – album coordinator
- Esther Monk – assistant to the producer
- Kevin Merrill – photography
- Samantha Weaver – hair and makeup stylist
- Michael Caprio – CD package design
- Peyce Byron, Sabrina Cowans, Michele Mais, Brenda Silas Moore, Wayne Moore – "Surrender" vocal ensemble
- recorded at Westlake Audio, Los Angeles, California
- mastered at OceanView Digital Mastering, Los Angeles, California
