= Leave Me Alone (Ruby Red Dress) =

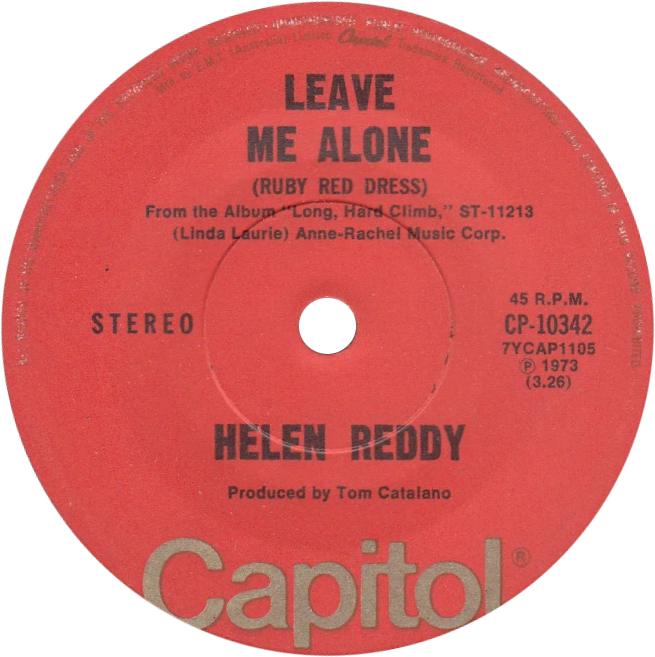
- Side A of the Australian single

Single by Helen Reddy

from the album Long Hard Climb
- B-side: "The Old Fashioned Way" (US); "Don't You Mess With a Woman" (Aus)
- Released: October 1973 (US)
- Recorded: 1973
- Genre: Pop
- Length: 3:26
- Label: Capitol
- Songwriter: Linda Laurie
- Producer: Tom Catalano

Helen Reddy singles chronology
"Delta Dawn" (1973)	"Leave Me Alone (Ruby Red Dress)" (1973)	"Keep On Singing" (1974)

"Leave Me Alone (Ruby Red Dress)" is a 1973 song written and first recorded by American singer-songwriter Linda Laurie. It was famously covered by Australian-American singer Helen Reddy several months later; Reddy's cover was a million-selling, Gold-certified hit single.

Laurie recorded "Leave Me Alone (Ruby Red Dress)" for MCA Records in the summer of 1973. The song was shopped to Helen Reddy who recorded it for her Long Hard Climb album which was released August 1973, and the track was issued as a single that October.

== Helen Reddy version ==
Capitol Records issued "Leave Me Alone" as the follow-up single to Reddy's No. 1 hit "Delta Dawn" despite the misgivings of Reddy herself who felt "Leave Me Alone" was a thematic retread of "Delta Dawn" as both songs concern a Southern woman - alliteratively named - whose reason has been undermined by an ill-fated tryst. As well, Reddy found the song's chorus with its repetition of the phrase "leave me alone" monotonous.

Capitol Records was correct in believing the resemblance to Reddy's precedent hit would work in "Leave Me Alone"'s favor as the song reached the American Top Ten chart six weeks after its single release. It hit No.1 in Cash Box and rose to No. 3 on the Billboard Hot 100, making Long Hard Climb the only one of Reddy's albums to feature two Top Ten songs.

"Leave Me Alone" became Reddy's third US single release to be certified Gold for sales of over one million units and was also the second of Reddy's six consecutive No. 1 songs on the Billboard Easy Listening Chart. She would eventually score eight No.1 Billboard Easy Listening/Adult Contemporary songs overall.

In Australia, "Leave Me Alone" followed "Delta Dawn" as Reddy's second consecutive - and final - No. 1 ranked song, topping the charts dated 7 & 14 January 1974. "Leave Me Alone" was the first Helen Reddy single to build momentum in the UK with six weeks in February and March 1974 spent approaching the UK Top 50; however the single ultimately failed to reach the chart.

The song was the subject of a nationwide contest in America in which listeners would submit to their local radio station their estimation of how many times Reddy sang the phrase "leave me alone" in the song; submissions of the correct answer - which Reddy states is 43 - were eligible for a trip for two to see Helen in concert.

Reddy sang this song as a skit on The Carol Burnett Show, with the show's cast (Vicki Lawrence, Harvey Korman, and Tim Conway) singing the chorus, which gets interrupted by Reddy, who tells the guests that they all sounded "TERRIBLE".

When Reddy came out of retirement in 2013, playing US club dates with an act focused on songs she'd recorded which were not released as singles, she cited "Leave Me Alone (Ruby Red Dress)" as "one song I will never ever sing again" disparaging its lyrical repetitiveness: "that sort of songwriting doesn’t do much for me, but it was a hit. However, I don’t have to sing it anymore if I don’t want to, and I don’t want to."

=== Charts ===
==== Weekly charts ====
Chart (1973–1974)	Peak position
Australia (Kent Music Report)	1
Canada RPM Top Singles	5
Canada RPM Adult Contemporary	1
New Zealand (Listener)	13
US Billboard Hot 100	3
US Billboard Adult Contemporary	1
US Cash Box Top 100	1

==== Year-end charts ====
Chart (1973)	Rank
Canada RPM Top Singles	136

Chart (1974)	Rank
Australia (Kent Music Report)	8
US Billboard Hot 100	71
US Billboard Adult Contemporary	4
US Cash Box Top 100	38

== Other covers ==
Country music artist Arlene Harden covered "Leave Me Alone (Ruby Red Dress)" in a Nashville session produced by Frank Jones on 10 May 1974 with the track serving as her debut release on Capitol Records that June; it fell short of hit status with a No. 72 peak on the Billboard C&W chart in August 1974.

Samantha Sang recorded "Leave Me Alone (Ruby Red Dress)" for her 1975 debut album Samantha Sang and Rocked the World.

== See also ==
- List of number-one singles in Australia during the 1970s
- List of number-one adult contemporary singles of 1973 (U.S.)
