= Peaceful (song) =

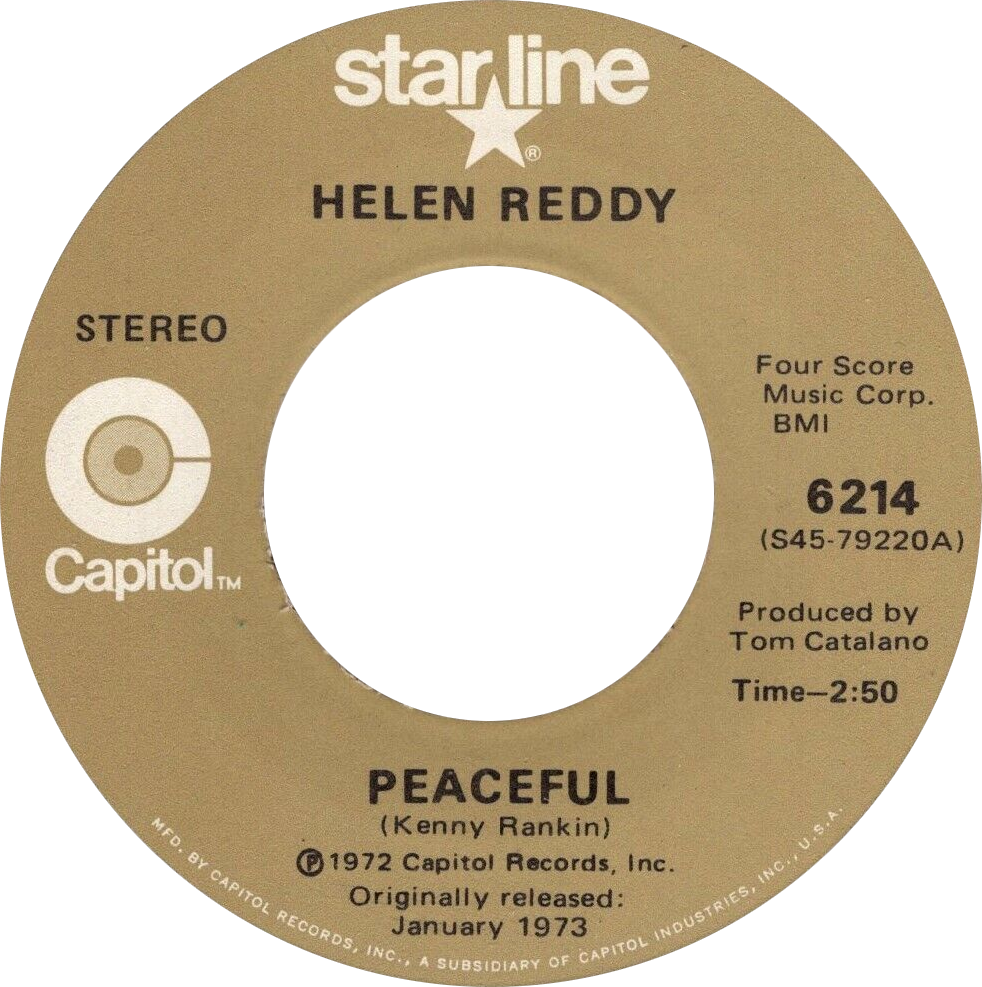
- One of US reissues

Single by Helen Reddy

from the album I Am Woman
- B-side: "What Would They Say"
- Released: January 1973
- Recorded: 1972
- Length: 2:50
- Label: Capitol Records
- Songwriter: Kenny Rankin
- Producer: Tom Catalano

Helen Reddy singles chronology
"I Am Woman" (1972)	"Peaceful" (1973)	"Delta Dawn" (1973)

"Peaceful" is a song written by Kenny Rankin, and recorded by several artists. It is best known as hit singles for Georgie Fame (1969) and Helen Reddy (1973).

Introduced by Rankin on his 1967 debut album Mind Dusters on Mercury Records, "Peaceful" was recorded by Bobbie Gentry for her 1968 album Local Gentry on Capitol Records. A 1969 single recording by Georgie Fame, produced by Mike Smith and arranged/conducted by Keith Mansfield for CBS, reached number 16 in the UK that summer. Fame's version of "Peaceful" had a concurrent single release in the US by Epic Records, prompting Mercury to issue Rankin's original track as a single, but neither single charted. "Peaceful" was also recorded in 1969 by the Friends of Distinction for their Grazin' album on RCA.

Rankin re-recorded the song in 1972, in a new arrangement for his album Like a Seed, his Atlantic Records debut and first chart appearance. That same year, Helen Reddy recorded "Peaceful" for her 1972 I Am Woman album. Issued as the follow-up to the number 1 hit "I Am Woman" in February 1973, Reddy's version of "Peaceful" peaked at number 12 on the Billboard Hot 100 that May. "Peaceful" also became Reddy's second consecutive number 2 Easy Listening hit: the follow-up "Delta Dawn" would be Reddy's first Easy Listening #1 (the first of six consecutive and eight overall). In Canada, "Peaceful" spent two weeks at number 1 on the Adult Contemporary chart.

In September 1996, Rhino issued a retrospective Kenny Rankin album with "Peaceful" as the title cut, the full title being Peaceful: The Best of Kenny Rankin.

== Chart performance ==
Georgie Fame version

Chart (1969)	Peak position
UK Singles	16

Helen Reddy version

=== Weekly charts ===
Chart (1973)	Peak position
Australia	36
Canada RPM Top Singles	12
Canadian Adult Contemporary	1
US Billboard Hot 100	12
US Billboard Adult Contemporary	2
US Cash Box Top 100	14

=== Year-end charts ===
Chart (1973)	Rank
Canada	168
US Billboard Hot 100	81
