= Delta Dawn =

1972 song written by Larry Collins and Alex Harvey

Promotional single by Alex Harvey

from the album Alex Harvey
- Released: 1971
- Genre: Country, folk rock
- Length: 4:02
- Label: Capitol
- Songwriters: Larry Collins; Alex Harvey
- Producer: Michael Sunday

Alex Harvey singles chronology
"To Make My Life Beautiful" (1971)	"Delta Dawn" (1971)	"Old Fashioned Feeling" (1972)

"Delta Dawn" is a song written by musician Larry Collins and country songwriter Alex Harvey. (Note: Harvey more often went by the name Alexander Harvey in later years, to avoid being confused with Glaswegian rocker Alex Harvey.) The first notable recording of the song was in 1972 by American singer and actress Bette Midler for her debut album The Divine Miss M. However, it is best known as a 1972 top ten country hit for Tanya Tucker and a 1973 US number one hit for Helen Reddy.

== Titling ==
The title character is a faded former Southern belle from Brownsville, Tennessee, who, at 41, is obsessed with the long-ago memory of a suitor who jilted her. The lyrics describe how the woman regularly "walks downtown with a suitcase in her hand/looking for a mysterious dark-haired man" who she says will be taking her to "his mansion in the sky".

=== Writing ===
Alex Harvey said he wrote the song about his mother:

My mother had come from the Mississippi Delta and she always lived her life as if she had a suitcase in her hand but nowhere to put it down.

Ten years before Harvey wrote the song, he was performing on TV and told his mother not to come, lest she get drunk and embarrass him. That night she died in a car crash, and Harvey believed it was suicide caused by his rejection.

For years Harvey suffered from guilt over the incident, until a cathartic incident the night he wrote the song. He was at fellow songwriter Larry Collins' house, who was asleep while Harvey noodled around on his guitar. He believed his mother then came to him in a vision:

I looked up and I felt as if my mother was in the room. I saw her very clearly. She was in a rocking chair and she was laughing...I really believe that my mother didn't come into the room that night to scare me, but to tell me, 'It's okay,' and that she had made her choices in life and it had nothing to do with me. I always felt like that song was a gift to my mother and an apology to her. It was also a way to say 'thank you' to my mother for all she did.

After writing the first few lines of the song, Harvey woke Collins and they finished it together.

== Cover versions ==
The first recording of "Delta Dawn" was made by Harvey for his album Alex Harvey released in November 1971. Harvey had performed as the opening act for Helen Reddy at the Troubadour in January 1972, but at that time Reddy (who also was signed with the Capitol Records label) made no connection with any of Harvey's compositions.

=== Bette Midler version ===
"Delta Dawn"
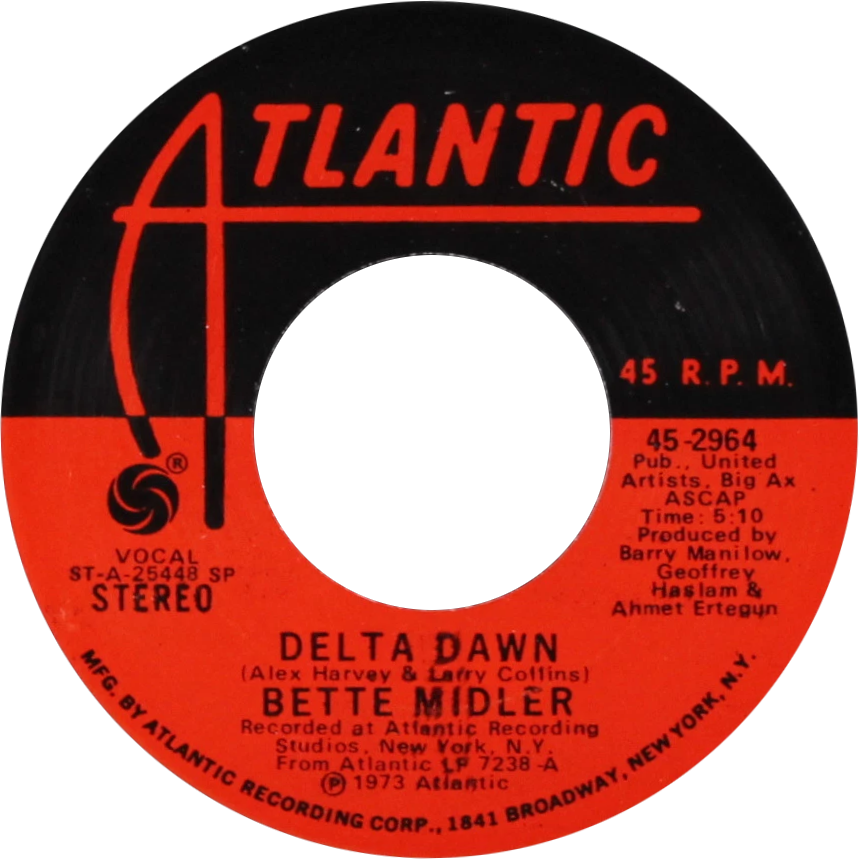
- US release of the Bette Midler recording

Single by Bette Midler

from the album The Divine Miss M
- A-side: "Boogie Woogie Bugle Boy"
- Released: May 1973
- Studio: Atlantic Recording Studios, New York, New York
- Genre: Pop rock
- Length: 5:18
- Label: Atlantic
- Songwriters: Larry Collins; Alex Harvey

During the time Tanya Tucker’s and Helen Reddy’s recordings of the song were being produced, Bette Midler recorded "Delta Dawn" for her The Divine Miss M debut album, for which her bluesy version was planned as the lead single. Reddy's single was released June 1973, two days after Midler's. The preemption required a marketing change for Midler, so the original B-side "Boogie Woogie Bugle Boy" was shopped to radio, itself becoming a top ten hit.

The song was also included on Midler's 1977 live album Live at Last which was recorded at the Cleveland Music Hall in Cleveland, Ohio.

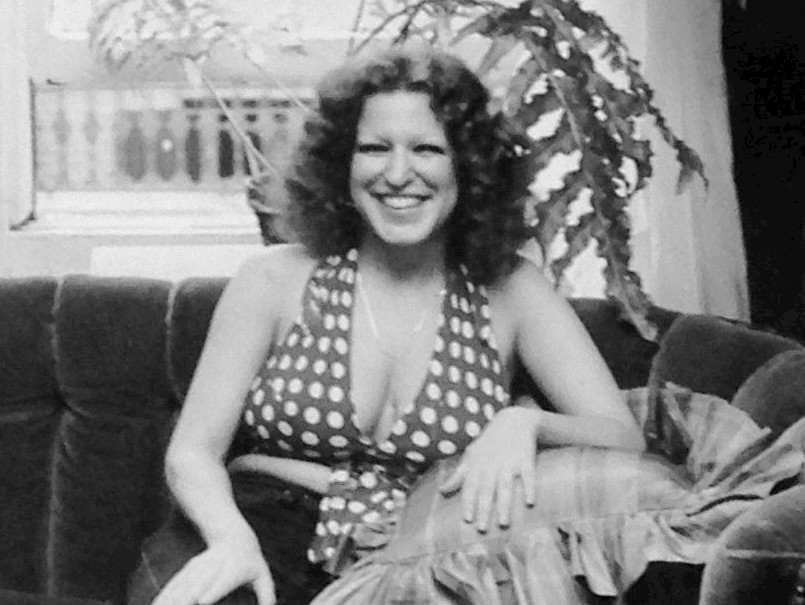
Bette Midler, 1973

=== Tanya Tucker version ===
"Delta Dawn"
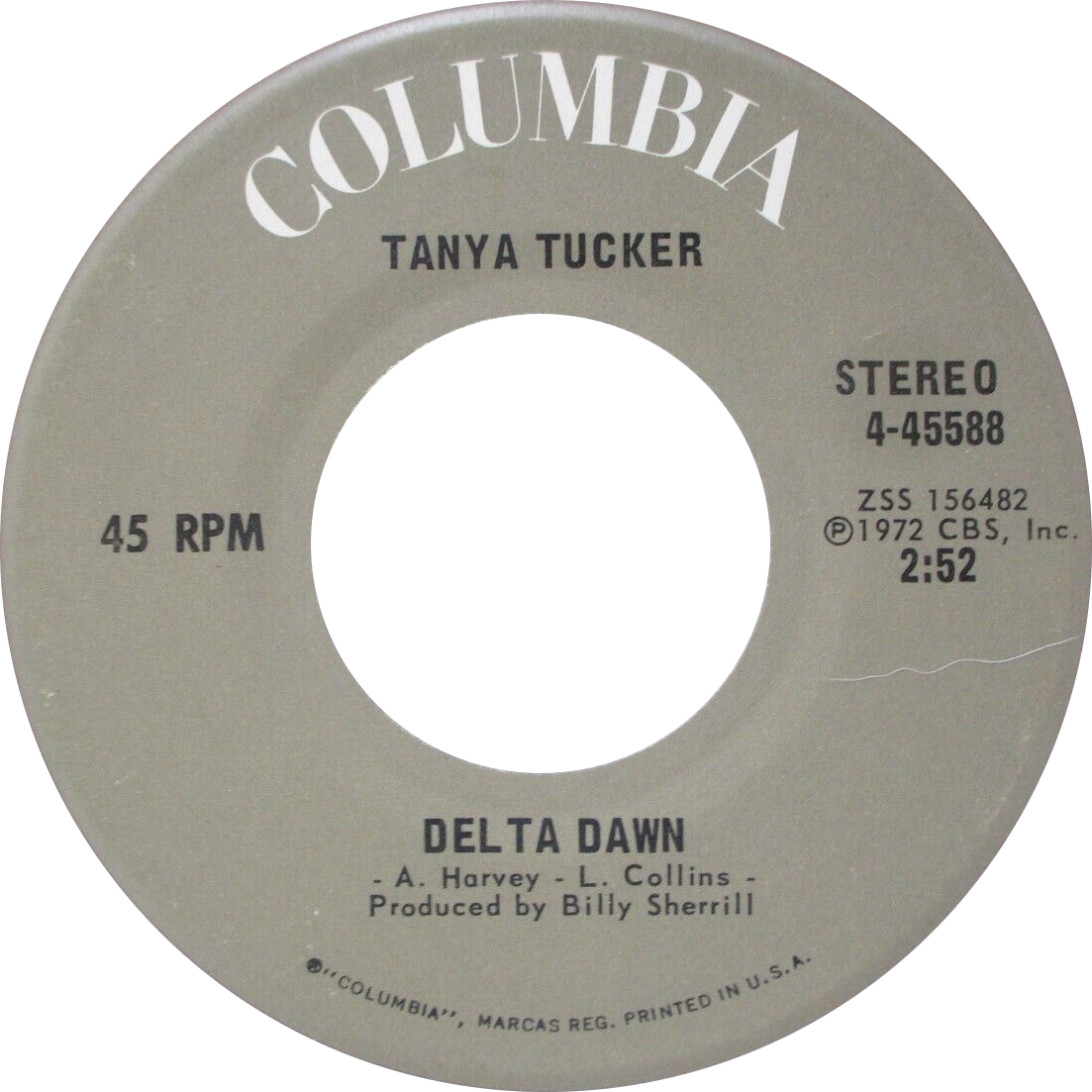
- One of side-A labels of the US single

Single by Tanya Tucker

from the album Delta Dawn
- B-side: "I Love the Way He Loves Me"
- Released: April 10, 1972
- Recorded: March 17, 1972
- Studio: Columbia Studios, Nashville, Tennessee
- Genre: Country
- Length: 2:59
- Label: Columbia
- Songwriters: Larry Collins; Alex Harvey
- Producer: Billy Sherrill

Tanya Tucker singles chronology
"Delta Dawn" (1972)	"Love's the Answer/The Jamestown Ferry" (1972)

Before Bette Midler's recording, Nashville-based producer Billy Sherrill heard her sing "Delta Dawn" on The Tonight Show and wanted to sign Midler to Epic Records and have her record it. Upon finding that Midler already signed with Atlantic Records, Sherrill cut the song with Tanya Tucker, who was newly signed to Columbia, at the Columbia Studios in Nashville, Tennessee. Tucker's version was released in April 1972; it reached number six Country that spring.

While Harvey's original version started with the first verse, Sherrill suggested starting with the chorus instead, done a cappella – a term unknown to 13-year-old Tucker. This distinction became a signature of her version.

Chart (1972)	Peak position
US Billboard Hot 100	72
US Hot Country Songs (Billboard)	6
Canadian RPM Country Tracks	3

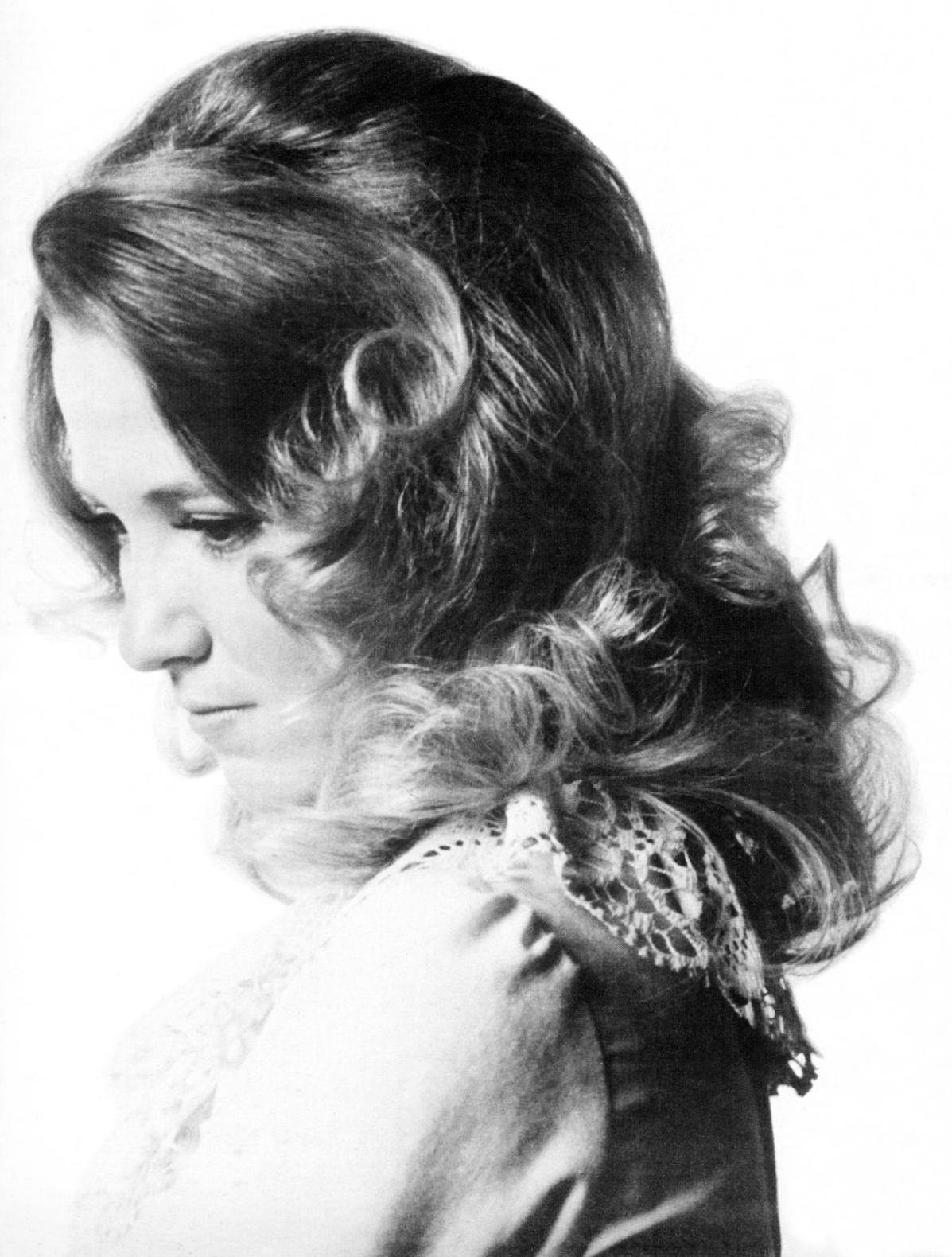
Tanya Tucker, 1973

=== Helen Reddy version ===
"Delta Dawn"
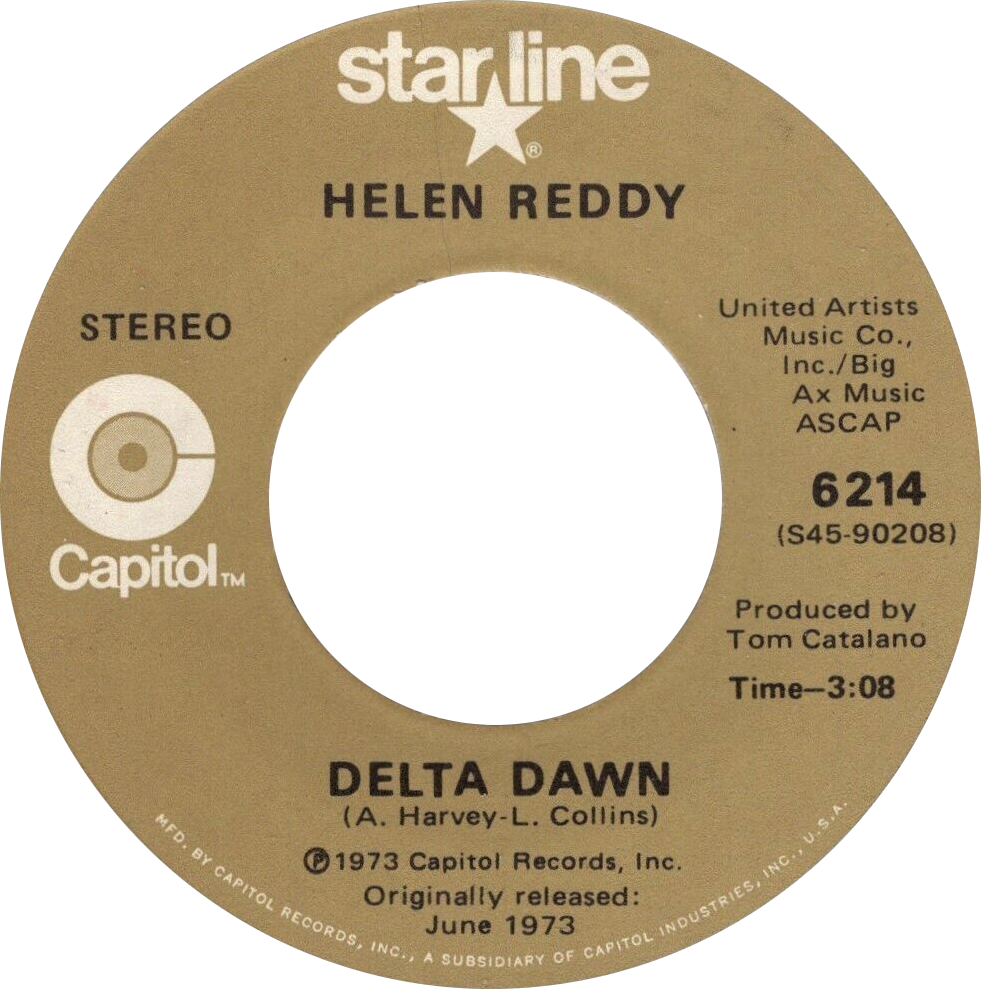
- One of US reissues

Single by Helen Reddy

from the album Long Hard Climb
- B-side: "If We Could Still Be Friends"
- Released: June 1973
- Recorded: 1972
- Genre: Pop
- Length: 3:08
- Label: Capitol
- Songwriters: Larry Collins, Alex Harvey
- Producer: Tom Catalano

Helen Reddy singles chronology
"Peaceful" (1973)	"Delta Dawn" (1973)	"Leave Me Alone (Ruby Red Dress)" (1973)

Record producer Tom Catalano created an instrumental track of "Delta Dawn." Catalano first offered the vocal track to Barbra Streisand, but she refused; after this he gave the vocal to Reddy.

Reddy's version, which added upward modulation to Tucker's cold intro and nonstop vocals throughout, entered the top ten on 18 August 1973, on its way to its lone week at number one on the main Billboard Hot 100 chart, on 15 September 1973. It remained in the top 10 for eight weeks, and was ranked as the No. 14 song for 1973 according to Billboard. "Delta Dawn" was also the first of Reddy's six consecutive—and eight overall—number one hits on the Billboard Easy Listening chart. The song also topped the Cash Box chart on 8 September 1973, remaining at number one for two weeks.

Reddy had reached number two with both "I Don't Know How to Love Him" and "I Am Woman" in her native Australia; "Delta Dawn" became her first number one hit there, spending five weeks at the top of the Kent Music Report in August and September 1973. "Delta Dawn" also marked Reddy's only chart appearance in South Africa, reaching number 13 in the autumn of 1973.

==== Weekly charts ====
Chart (1973)	Peak position
Australia (Kent Music Report)	1
Canada RPM Top Singles	1
Canada RPM Adult Contemporary	1
New Zealand (Listener)	1
South Africa (Springbok Radio)	13
US Billboard Hot 100	1
US Billboard Easy Listening	1
US Cash Box Top 100	1

===== Year-end charts =====
Chart (1973)	Rank
Australia	6
Canada RPM Top Singles	2
US Billboard Hot 100	14
US Billboard Easy Listening	1
US Cash Box Top 100	3

==== Certifications ====
Certifications for the Helen Reddy version
Region	Certification	Certified units/sales
Australia (ARIA)	Gold	50,000^{^}
New Zealand (RMNZ)	Gold	10,000^{*}
United States (RIAA)	Gold	1,000,000^{^}
^{*} Sales figures based on certification alone.^{^} Shipments figures based on certification alone.

=== Sylvie Vartan version (French) ===
"Toi le garçon"

Single by Sylvie Vartan
- Language: French
- English title: You're the boy
- B-side: "L'amour au diapason"
- Released: October 1973
- Genre: Pop
- Length: 3:24
- Label: RCA
- Songwriters: Larry Collins; Alex Harvey; Michel Mallory

Sylvie Vartan singles chronology
"L’homme que tu seras" (1973)	"Toi le garçon" (1973)	"Bye Bye Leroy Brown" (1973)

In 1973, the song was adapted into French by Michel Mallory as "Toi le garçon" (meaning "You're the boy"). It was recorded by French pop singer Sylvie Vartan and released as a non-album single in October 1973. Vartan's version peaked at Number 22 on the French Belgian charts on March 9, 1974.

Chart (1974)	Peak position
Belgium (Ultratop 50 Wallonia)	22

=== Other versions ===
Nola Francis released a version of the song in 1973. It peaked at number 98 in Australia.

American country group Home Free released the a capella version of "Delta Dawn" together with country singer and songwriter Brooke Eden in 2023.

== See also ==
- List of number-one adult contemporary singles of 1973 (U.S.)
- List of Hot 100 number-one singles of 1973 (U.S.)
