= Douglas Kirkland =

Canadian photographer (1934–2022)

- Born: Douglas Morley Kirkland; August 16, 1934; Toronto, Ontario, Canada
- Died: October 2, 2022 (aged 88); Los Angeles, California, U.S.
- Occupation: Photographer

Douglas Morley Kirkland (August 16, 1934 – October 2, 2022) was a Canadian-born American photographer. He was noted for his photographs of celebrities, especially the ones he took of Marilyn Monroe several months before her death.

== Early life ==
Kirkland was born in Toronto on August 16, 1934. He was raised in nearby Fort Erie, where his father managed a small store that sold suits. He later recounted how he developed his penchant for photography while perusing the Life magazines his father brought back from his store. Kirkland attended Seneca Vocational High School in Buffalo, New York, before immigrating to the United States permanently.

== Career ==
Kirkland first worked for a printing studio in Richmond, Virginia. He then served as Sherwin Greenberg's assistant for a year starting in 1957. He was subsequently employed by Look magazine. It was in that capacity that he was allocated a photo session with Marilyn Monroe in 1961. The photos, taken only a few months prior to her death, became some of the most noteworthy ones of her, thereby kick-starting his career.

Over the years, various notable persons later posed for Kirkland, from the great photography innovator Man Ray and photographer/painter Jacques Henri Lartigue to Dr. Stephen Hawking. Entertainment celebrities he photographed included Romy Schneider, Audrey Hepburn, Mick Jagger, Sting, Björk, Arnold Schwarzenegger, Morgan Freeman, Orson Welles, Andy Warhol, Oliver Stone, Mikhail Baryshnikov, Angelina Jolie, Leonardo DiCaprio, Coco Chanel, Marlene Dietrich, Brigitte Bardot, Judy Garland, Elizabeth Taylor, Sophia Loren, Catherine Deneuve, Michael Jackson, Paris Hilton, and Diana Ross. Kirkland's portrait of Charlie Chaplin is at the National Portrait Gallery in London.

Kirkland was contracted for work around the world and worked in the motion picture industry as a special photographer on more than 150 films. These included 2001: A Space Odyssey, The Sound of Music, Sophie's Choice, Out of Africa, The Pirate Movie, Butch Cassidy and the Sundance Kid, Romancing the Stone, Titanic, and Moulin Rouge!. Some of his famous film shots include John Travolta in the dance sequence from Saturday Night Fever, a portrait of Judy Garland crying, and the March 1976 Playboy pictorial of Margot Kidder. In 1995 Kirkland received a Lifetime Achievement Award from the American motion pictures Society of Operating Cameramen.

Kirkland's picture book, Titanic (1998), was the first of its kind to reach No.1 on the New York Times Best Seller list and did so on both the hardcover and paperback lists. He followed this with the book project titled A Life in Pictures, which was released in 2013.

== Personal life ==
Kirkland was married to Françoise until his death. He had three children: Karen, Lisa, and Mark, who is a director of The Simpsons. They resided in Hollywood Hills during his later years.

== Bibliography ==
In 1993, Kirkland presented the illustrated book titled: "ICONS: Creativity with Camera and Computer", published by Collins Publishers, which consisted of sixty-six original photographs of famous people that were modified digitally to result in a new creation, each accompanied by a commentary paragraph. Many of the pictures were of well-known actresses and actors from Hollywood. It also included music entertainers like Michael Jackson, Grace Jones, and Billy Idol, and fashion models; it also shows a couple of compositions of the physicist Stephen Hawking. The cover of the book was based on a 1969 portrait of Andy Warhol.
