= Peter Borsari =

American-Swiss photographer (1939–2006

- Born: 1939; Zürich
- Died: May 29, 2006 (aged 66–67); Los Angeles
- Citizenship: America
- Occupation: Photographer
- Years active: 1965-1995

Peter C. Borsari (1939 in Zürich – May 29, 2006 in Los Angeles) was an American-Swiss photographer.

Borsari photographed people, places and events from 1965 to 1995, with subjects including Presley and Nixon.

Peter estimated his archive contained approximately two million images; including transparencies, negatives, prints and contact sheets. Roughly 80% of these images feature celebrities in the entertainment industry. The remainder consists primarily of prominent politicians (e.g. Nixon), athletes (e.g. Ali), events (e.g. Malibu fire), sports (e.g. Formula One) and travel destinations (e.g. Switzerland).

== Work ==
He established his success with a recording of Elizabeth Taylor and Richard Burton in Mexico. The Hollywood studios Columbia, Tri-Star, Warner Bros. and Universal hired Borsari to record parties and weddings, such as those of Natalie Wood and Robert Wagner or Harry Hamlin and Nicollette Sheridan.

Recordings of Marlon Brando, Sophia Loren, Francis Ford Coppola, Clint Eastwood, Elvis Presley, Frank Sinatra, Elizabeth Taylor and Jack Nicholson, for example, became famous and were published all over the world. From the 1990s, Borsari worked together with Laura Luongo and lived mainly from the marketing of his extensive archive.

Borsari died after a surgical procedure at Cedars-Sinai Medical Center in Los Angeles, California, and was buried in Zurich, Switzerland, at his own request.
