= Linda Laurie =

American singer (1941–2009)

- Born: Linda Gertz; May 26, 1941; New York City, US
- Died: November 20, 2009 (aged 68); Santa Barbara, California, US
- Occupations: Songwriter, singer
- Years active: 1959–2009

Linda Maxine Laurie (May 26, 1941 – November 20, 2009) was an American singer and songwriter, best known for the novelty record "Ambrose (Part 5)", which went to #52 on the Billboard chart in 1959 while she was in high school.

== "Ambrose (Part 5)" ==
While attending Abraham Lincoln High School in Brooklyn, New York, Laurie wrote and recorded a number of demo records, including "Sunglasses" which Linda recorded with her friend Linda Yellin as the "Knott Sisters"; the song failed to chart.

Another of Linda's songs was an odd tale of a girl walking through a dark subway tunnel with her boyfriend Ambrose, who implores her to "just keep walking." She recorded the number for Glory Records in late 1958 and took it around to radio stations, who liked the deep-throated Ambrose (which Laurie voiced herself) and bizarre non-sequiturs like, "We haven't got a color telephone."

"Ambrose (Part 5)" (despite the name, there were no parts one through four) entered the Billboard charts in January 1959 and peaked at #52 in March. (The flip side, "Ooh, What A Lover", also received some airplay.) The song's notoriety was enough to get young Linda on the February 10, 1959, edition of To Tell the Truth; only two of the four panelists correctly identified her. A follow-up, "Forever Ambrose", in which the pair leave the subway tunnel and Ambrose even sings, failed to hit the charts.

From 1960-64, she made a number of other recordings for various small labels: "Stay with Me" (Andie 5015); "Chico" (Keetch 6001); "Lucky" (Recona 3502); "Prince Charming" (Rust 5022); and "Stay-At-Home Sue" (Rust 5042), a musical rejoinder to Dion's "Runaround Sue." In 1962, Linda reconnected with Ambrose in "The Return of Ambrose" (Rust 5061).

== Later years ==
After relocating to the West Coast, Laurie wrote a number of songs for other artists, including Bobby Vinton ("I'm Comin' Home Girl"), Sonny and Cher ("Crystal Clear, Muddy Waters" and "I Love What You Did With The Love I Gave You", which she co-wrote with Annette Tucker), Cher solo ("When You Find Out Where You're Going, Let Me Know"), Nancy Sinatra (with Frank Sinatra; "Life's a Trippy Thing") and Love Unlimited ("I Did It For Love").

However, her biggest hit as a songwriter came with "Leave Me Alone (Ruby Red Dress)," which went to #3 for Helen Reddy in late 1973. Laurie's version was issued by MCA Records earlier in the year. She also wrote the theme song for the 1970s Saturday-morning show "Land of the Lost," which was featured in the 2009 movie featuring Will Ferrell. The band Everclear recorded the tune on their all-covers album The Vegas Years.

Her music was rediscovered in the 1990s through various hip-hop songs; "I Did It for Love" has been sampled in such hits as Puff Daddy's "It's All About the Benjamins" (later parodied by "Weird Al" Yankovic as "It's All About the Pentiums"), Mariah Carey's "Miss You," Shyne's "The Gang," Swizz Beats' "Money in the Bank," and more.

Laurie served as executive director for Theatre of Life for Children, designed "to provide an accessible, community-based, multi-cultural performing arts program dedicated to healing and developing the talents and passion in children."

Laurie died of cancer at a hospital in Santa Barbara, California on November 20, 2009, at the age of 68.
