= Helen Reddy =

Australian and American singer, actress, TV host, and activist (1941–2020)

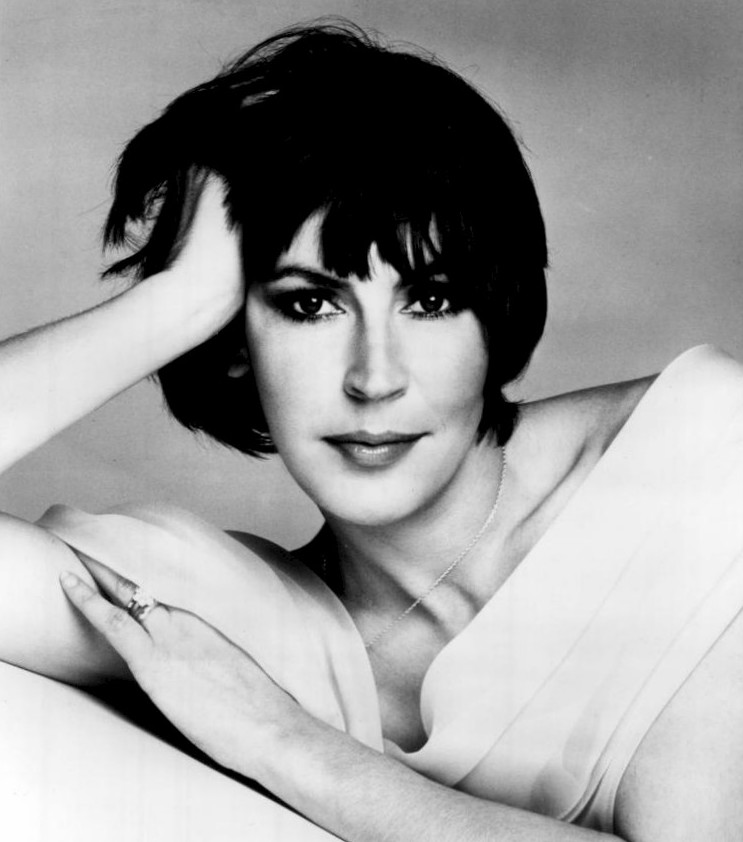
- Reddy in 1975
- Born: Helen Maxine Reddy; 25 October 1941; Melbourne, Victoria, Australia
- Died: 29 September 2020 (aged 78); Los Angeles, California, US
- Citizenship: Australia; United States
- Occupations: Singer; actress; activist; television host
- Years active: 1965–2002; 2011–2017
- Known for: "I Am Woman"
- Political party: Democratic
- Spouses: Claude Weate (m. 1961; div. 1966) Jeff Wald (m. 1968; div. 1983) Milton Ruth (m. 1984; div. 1995)
- Children: 2
- Relatives: Toni Lamond (half-sister); Tony Sheldon (nephew); Patsy Reddy (cousin)
- Musical career
- Genres: Pop; easy listening
- Instrument: Vocals
- Labels: Fontana/PolyGram; Capitol/EMI; MCA; Helen Reddy Inc.; Varèse Sarabande

Helen Maxine Reddy (25 October 1941 – 29 September 2020) was an Australian-American singer, actress, television host, and activist. Born in Melbourne to a show business family, Reddy started her career as an entertainer in vaudeville at age four. She sang on radio and television and won a talent contest on the television program Bandstand (Note: Not to be confused with Dick Clark's television program American Bandstand; here Bandstand refers to the variety program hosted by Australian presenter Brian Henderson.) in 1966; her prize was a ticket to New York City and a record audition, which was unsuccessful. After a short and unsuccessful singing career in New York, she eventually moved to Chicago, and subsequently, Los Angeles, where she made her debut singles "One Way Ticket" and "I Believe in Music" in 1968 and 1970, respectively. The B-side of the latter single, "I Don't Know How to Love Him", reached number eight on the pop chart of the Canadian magazine RPM. She was signed to Capitol Records a year later.

During the 1970s, Reddy enjoyed international success, especially in the United States, where she placed 15 singles on the top 40 of the Billboard Hot 100. Six made the top 10 and three reached number one, including her signature hit "I Am Woman". She placed 25 songs on the Billboard Adult Contemporary chart; 15 made the top 10 and eight reached number one, six consecutively. In 1974, at the inaugural American Music Awards, she won the award for Favorite Pop/Rock Female Artist. On television, she was the first Australian to host a one-hour weekly primetime variety show on an American network, along with specials that were seen in more than 40 countries.

Between the 1980s and 1990s, as her single "I Can't Say Goodbye to You" (1981) became her last to chart in the US, Reddy acted in musicals and recorded albums such as Center Stage before retiring from live performance in 2002. She returned to university in Australia, earned a degree, and practised as a clinical hypnotherapist and motivational speaker. In 2011, after singing "Breezin' Along with the Breeze" with her half-sister, Toni Lamond, for Lamond's birthday, Reddy decided to return to live performing.

Reddy's song "I Am Woman" played a significant role in popular culture, becoming an anthem for second-wave feminism. She came to be known as a "feminist poster girl" or a "feminist icon". In 2011, Billboard named her the number-28 adult contemporary artist of all time (the number-9 woman). In 2013, the Chicago Tribune dubbed her the "Queen of '70s Pop".

== Early years ==
Helen Maxine Reddy was born into a well-known Australian showbusiness family in Melbourne. Her mother was Stella Campbell (née Lamond), an actress, singer and dancer; her father was Maxwell David Reddy, a writer, producer and actor. Reddy was born during World War II. Her father was a sergeant in the Australian Army with a unit of entertainers, serving in New Guinea with one of his actor friends, Peter Finch, at the time of Reddy's birth. Her father returned to service during the Korean War. Her mother performed at the Majestic Theatre in Sydney and was best-known as a regular cast member on the television programs Homicide (1964), Bellbird (1967) and Country Town (1971). During Reddy's childhood, she was educated at Tintern Grammar and later Stratherne Girls' School in Hawthorn for a short time (mostly to study drama). Her half-sister Toni Lamond and her nephew Tony Sheldon are actor-singers.

Reddy had Irish, Scottish and English ancestry. Her great-great-grandfather, Edward Reddy, was born in Dublin, Ireland, in 1855. Her Scottish great-grandfather, Thomas Lamond, was a one-time mayor of Waterloo, New South Wales, whose patron was Hercules Robinson, 1st Baron Rosmead. Patsy Reddy, a former New Zealand governor-general, is a distant cousin.

At age four, Reddy joined her parents on the Australian vaudeville circuit, singing and dancing; she recalled: "It was instilled in me: 'You will be a star'. So between the ages of 12 and 17, I got rebellious and decided this was not for me. I was going to be a housewife and mother." At age 12, owing to her parents' constant touring nationwide and their arguing, Reddy went to live with her paternal aunt, Helen "Nell" Reddy, "who was her role model"; as her aunt, "she gave her niece stability, a sense of morality, and strength" for her future career as a singer who motivated women. The younger Helen's teenaged rebellion in favour of domesticity manifested as marriage to Kenneth Claude Weate, a considerably older musician and family friend; divorce ensued, and to support herself as a single mother to daughter Traci, she resumed her performing career, concentrating on singing, since health problems precluded dancing (she had a kidney removed at 17). She sang on radio and television, eventually winning a talent contest on the Australian pop music TV show Bandstand, the prize ostensibly being a trip to New York City to cut a single for Mercury Records. After arriving in New York in 1966, she was informed by Mercury that her prize was only the chance to "audition" for the label and that Mercury considered the Bandstand footage to constitute her audition, which was deemed unsuccessful. Despite having only US$200 (equivalent to $1,985 in 2025) and a return ticket to Australia, she decided to remain in the United States with three-year-old Traci and pursue a singing career.

== Music career ==
=== 1966–1968: Early career ===
Reddy recalled her 1966 appearance at the Three Rivers Inn in Syracuse, New York—"[T]here were like twelve people in the audience"—as being typical of her early US performing career. Her lack of a work permit made it difficult to obtain singing jobs and she was forced to make trips to Canada which did not require work permits for citizens of Commonwealth countries. In 1968, Martin St James, an Australian stage hypnotist she had met in New York City, threw Reddy a party with an admission price of US$5 (equivalent to $46.29 in 2025) to enable Reddy—then down to her last US$12 (equivalent to $111.1 in 2025)—to pay her rent. On this occasion, Reddy met her future manager and husband, Jeff Wald, a 22-year-old secretary at the William Morris Agency who crashed the party. Reddy told People in 1975, "[Wald] didn't pay the five dollars, but it was love at first sight."

Wald recalled that Reddy and he married three days after meeting and, along with daughter Traci, the couple took up residence at the Hotel Albert in Greenwich Village. Reddy later stated that she married Wald "out of desperation over her right to work and live in the United States". According to New York Magazine, Wald was fired from William Morris soon after having met Reddy and "Helen supported them for six months doing $35-a-night hospital and charity benefits. They were so broke that they snuck out of a hotel room carrying their clothes in paper bags." Reddy recalled: "When we did eat, it was spaghetti, and we spent what little money we had on cockroach spray." They left New York City for Chicago, where Wald landed a job as talent coordinator at Mister Kelly's. While in Chicago, Reddy gained a reputation singing in local lounges, including Mister Kelly's, and in 1968 she landed a deal with Fontana Records, a division of major-label Chicago-based Mercury Records. Her first single, "One Way Ticket", on Fontana was not an American hit but it did give Reddy her first appearance on any chart as it peaked at number 83 in her native Australia.

=== 1969–1975: "I Am Woman" era and stardom ===
Within a year, Wald moved Reddy and Traci to Los Angeles, where he was hired at Capitol Records, the label under which Reddy was to attain stardom; however, Wald was hired and fired the same day. At the same time, in 1969, Reddy enrolled at the University of California Los Angeles to study psychology and philosophy part-time.

Reddy became frustrated as Wald found success managing acts such as Deep Purple and Tiny Tim without making any evident effort to promote her; after 18 months of career inactivity, Reddy gave Wald an ultimatum: "he [must] either revitalise her career or get out... Jeff threw himself into his new career as Mr. Helen Reddy. Five months of phone calls to Capitol Records executive Artie Mogull finally paid off; Mogull agreed to let Helen cut one single if Jeff promised not to call for a month. She did "I Believe in Music" penned by Mac Davis backed with "I Don't Know How to Love Him" from Tim Rice and Andrew Lloyd Webber's Jesus Christ Superstar. The A-side fell flat, but then some Canadian DJs flipped the record over and it became a hit – number 13 in June 1971 – and Helen Reddy was on her way."

Reddy's stardom was consolidated when her single "I Am Woman" reached number one on the Billboard Hot 100 in December 1972. The song was co-written by Reddy with Ray Burton; Reddy attributed the impetus for writing "I Am Woman" and her early awareness of the women's movement to expatriate Australian rock critic and pioneer feminist Lillian Roxon. Reddy is quoted in Fred Bronson's The Billboard Book of Number One Hits as having said that she was looking for songs to record which reflected the positive self-image she had gained from joining the women's movement but could not find any, so "I realised that the song I was looking for didn't exist, and I was going to have to write it myself." "I Am Woman" first appeared on her debut album I Don't Know How to Love Him, released in May 1971. A new recording of the song was released as a single in May 1972 but barely dented the charts. Female listeners soon adopted the song as an anthem and began requesting it from their local radio stations in droves, resulting in its September chart re-entry and eventual number-one peak. "I Am Woman" earned Reddy a Grammy Award for Best Female Pop Vocal Performance. At the awards ceremony, Reddy concluded her acceptance speech by famously thanking God "because She makes everything possible". The success of "I Am Woman" made Reddy the first Australian singer to top the US charts. In 2025, the Library of Congress selected "I Am Woman" for inclusion as a single in the National Recording Registry.

Three decades after her Grammy, Reddy discussed the song's iconic status: "I think it came along at the right time. I'd gotten involved in the women's movement, and there were a lot of songs on the radio about being weak and being dainty and all those sort of things. All the women in my family, they were strong women. They worked. They lived through the Depression and a world war, and they were just strong women. I certainly didn't see myself as being dainty", she said.

Over the next five years following her first success, Reddy had more than a dozen US top-40 hits, including two more number-one hits. These tracks included Kenny Rankin's "Peaceful" (number 12), the Alex Harvey country ballad "Delta Dawn" (number one), Linda Laurie's "Leave Me Alone (Ruby Red Dress)" (number three), Danny Janssen & Bobby Hart's "Keep on Singing" (number 15), Paul Williams' "You and Me Against the World" (featuring daughter Traci reciting the spoken bookends) (number 9), Alan O'Day's "Angie Baby" (number one), Véronique Sanson and Patti Dahlstrom's "Emotion" (number 22), Harriet Schock's "Ain't No Way to Treat a Lady" (number eight) and the Richard Kerr/Will Jennings-penned "Somewhere in the Night" (number 19). She also had two Australian number-one singles, while "Angie Baby" was her only UK top-40 hit.

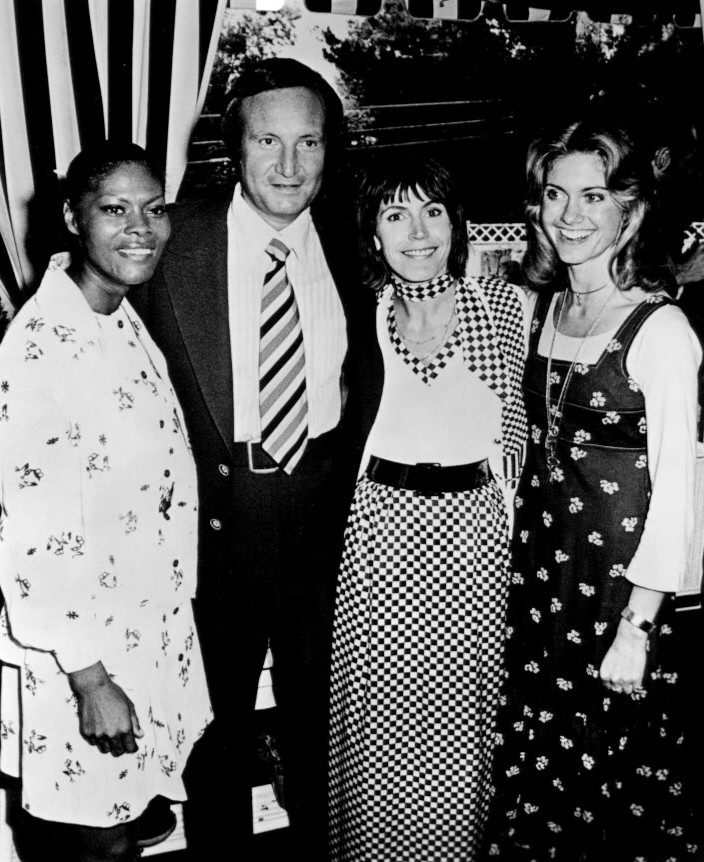
From left to right: Dionne Warwick, Don Kirshner, Reddy and Olivia Newton-John in 1974

On 23 July 1974, Reddy received a star, located at 1750 Vine Street, on the Hollywood Walk of Fame for her work in the music industry.

In August–September 1974, Reddy, along with Rolf Harris and many other entertainers and performers, to perform at Expo '74 in Spokane, Washington. On Tuesday 24 September Australia held a "national day", with Reddy singing the national anthem.

In late 1975, Reddy toured East Asia, Australia and New Zealand and collected 16 gold records, including 6 gold records in Australia and 6 gold records in New Zealand.

At the height of her fame in the mid 1970s, Reddy was a headliner, with a full chorus of backup singers and dancers to standing-room-only crowds on the Las Vegas Strip. Among her opening acts were Joan Rivers, David Letterman, Bill Cosby and Barry Manilow. In 1976, Reddy recorded the Beatles' song "The Fool on the Hill" for the musical documentary All This and World War II.

Reddy was also instrumental in supporting the career of friend Olivia Newton-John, encouraging her to move from England to the United States in the early 1970s, giving her professional opportunities that did not exist in the UK. At a dinner party at Reddy's house, Newton-John met producer Allan Carr, who offered her the starring role in the hit film version of the musical Grease.

=== 1976–1990: Career decline ===
Reddy was most successful on the Easy Listening chart, scoring eight number-one hits there over a three-year span, from "Delta Dawn" in 1973 to "I Can't Hear You No More" in 1976. However, the latter track evidenced a sharp drop in popularity for Reddy, with a number-29 peak on the Billboard Hot 100. Reddy's 1977 remake of Cilla Black's 1964 hit "You're My World" indicated comeback potential, with a number-18 peak, but this track – co-produced by Kim Fowley – would prove to be Reddy's last top-40 hit. Its source album, Ear Candy, Reddy's 10th album, became her first album to not attain at least gold status since her second full-length release, 1972's Helen Reddy.

In 1978, Reddy sang as a backup singer on Gene Simmons's solo album on the song "True Confessions". That year also saw the release of Reddy's only live album, Live in London, recorded at the London Palladium.

Of Reddy's eight subsequent single releases on Capitol, five reached the Easy Listening top 50 – including "Candle on the Water", from the 1977 Disney film Pete's Dragon (which starred Reddy). Only three ranked on the Billboard Hot 100: "The Happy Girls" (number 57) – the follow-up to "You're My World", and besides "I Am Woman", Reddy's only chart item that she co-wrote – and the disco tracks "Ready or Not" (number 73) and "Make Love to Me" (number 60), the latter a cover of an Australian hit by Kelly Marie, which gave Reddy a lone R&B chart ranking at number 59. Reddy also made it to number 98 on the Country chart with "Laissez les bon Temps Rouler", the B-side to "The Happy Girls".

Without the impetus of any major hits, Reddy's four Capitol album releases subsequent to Ear Candy failed to chart. In 1981, she said: "I signed [with Capitol] ten years ago ... And when you are with a company so long you tend to be taken for granted. For the last three years, I didn't feel I was getting the support from them."

May 1981 had the release of Play Me Out, Reddy's debut album for MCA Records, which she said had "made me a deal we [Reddy and Wald] couldn't refuse"; "we shopped around and felt the most enthusiasm at MCA". Reddy's new label affiliation would result in only one minor success; her remake of Becky Hobbs's 1979 country hit "I Can't Say Goodbye to You" returned her for the last time to the Billboard Hot 100 at number 88; it also returned Reddy to the charts in the UK and Ireland (her sole previous hit in both was "Angie Baby"). Her 14 November 1981 Top of the Pops performance brought "I Can't Say Goodbye to You" into the UK top 50; the track would rise there no higher than number 43, but in Ireland reached number 16, giving Reddy her final high placing on a major national chart. MCA released one further Reddy album, Imagination, in 1983; it would prove to be Reddy's final release as a career recording artist.

The unsuccessful Imagination was released just after the finalisation of Reddy's divorce from Wald, whose alleged subsequent interference in her career she blamed for the decline of her career profile in the mid-1980s: "Several of my performing contracts were cancelled, and one promoter told me he couldn't book me in case a certain someone 'came after him with a shotgun'." Reddy states that she was effectively being blacklisted from her established performance areas, which led to her pursuing a career in theatre where Wald had no significant influence.

=== 1990s–2000: Later recordings ===
In 1990, Reddy issued Feel So Young on her own label – an album that includes remakes of her repertoire favourites. Meanwhile, her one recording in the interim had been the 1987 dance maxisingle "Mysterious Kind", on which Reddy had vocally supported Jessica Williams. The 1997 release of Center Stage was an album of show tunes which Reddy recorded for Varèse Sarabande; the track "Surrender" – originating in Sunset Boulevard – was remixed for release as a dance maxisingle. Reddy's final album was the 2000 seasonal release The Best Christmas Ever. In April 2015, Reddy released a cover of the Beatles' "All You Need Is Love" for the album Keep Calm and Salute The Beatles on the Purple Pyramid label.

=== 2002–2010: Retirement ===
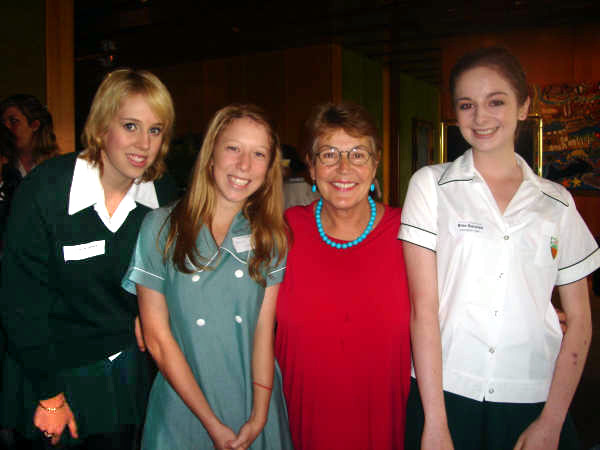
Reddy (second from right) in early 2007 with students at a women's leadership conference in Sydney

Reddy announced her retirement from performing in 2002, giving her farewell performance with the Edmonton Symphony Orchestra. The same year, she moved from her longtime residence in Santa Monica, California, back to her native Australia to spend time with her family, living first on Norfolk Island before taking up residence in Sydney.

Reddy also earned a degree in clinical hypnotherapy and neuro-linguistic programming. She was a practising clinical hypnotherapist and patron of the Australian Society of Clinical Hypnotherapists.

At a ceremony in August 2006, Reddy was inducted into the Australian Recording Industry Association (ARIA) Hall of Fame by actress singer, Toni Collette, who described her song, "I Am Woman", as "timeless". The song was performed by fellow Australian, Vanessa Amorosi.

In April 2008, Reddy was reported to be living "simply and frugally off song royalties, pension funds, and social security ... [renting] a 13th-floor apartment with a 180° view of Sydney Harbour". Her apartment had been recently appraised, causing Reddy concern over its future affordability; however, the New York-based landlord learned his tenant's identity and wrote her: "I had no idea it was the Helen Reddy who was living in my unit. Because of what you have done for millions of women all over the world, I will not sell or raise your rent. I hope you'll be very happy living there for years to come."

For several years, Reddy maintained that she would not return to the stage. In 2008, she stated, "It's not going to happen. I've moved on". She said that her voice had deepened to a lower key and she was not sure if she would be able to sing some of her hits. She also said that she had simply lost interest in performing, saying that "I have very wide-ranging interests". In 2011 she was interviewed by Australian television and said she was very happy to be retired from show business.

=== 2011–2020: Brief comeback to concerts ===
In 2011, Reddy decided to return to performing after being buoyed by the warm reception she received when she sang at her sister's 80th birthday party. "I hadn't heard my voice in 10 years, and when I heard it coming over the speaker, it was like: 'Oh, that's not bad. Maybe I should do that again,'" Reddy explained in 2013.

Being more in control of her performances also appealed to Reddy, who said, "I have more leeway in the songs that I choose to sing. I'm not locked into what the record company wants." She explained, "One of the reasons that I'm coming back to singing is because I'm not doing the greatest hits. I'm doing the songs that I always loved. So many are album cuts that never got any airplay, and they're gorgeous songs." She also performed many of her best-known songs, including, "Angie Baby", "You and Me Against the World", a medley of "Delta Dawn"/"Ain't No Way to Treat a Lady", and "I Am Woman", reasoning on the latter that the audience "comes to hear" it.

She said she refused to sing "Leave Me Alone (Ruby Red Dress)" because she disliked the monotony of the repeated chorus. "They used to have a contest on the radio that you could get two free tickets to Helen Reddy's show if you could tell us how many times she sang "leave me alone". I think it was like 42 times," she said.

Reddy appeared in downtown Los Angeles at the 2017 Women's March on 21 January. The march for women's rights and unity following the inauguration of Donald Trump brought out 750,000 people. Reddy was introduced by actress Jamie Lee Curtis and sang an a cappella version of "I Am Woman".

In August 2015, unnamed sources revealed that Reddy was diagnosed with dementia and had moved into the Motion Picture and Television Fund's Samuel Goldwyn Center, where she was cared for by family and friends.

== Film, theatre and television ==
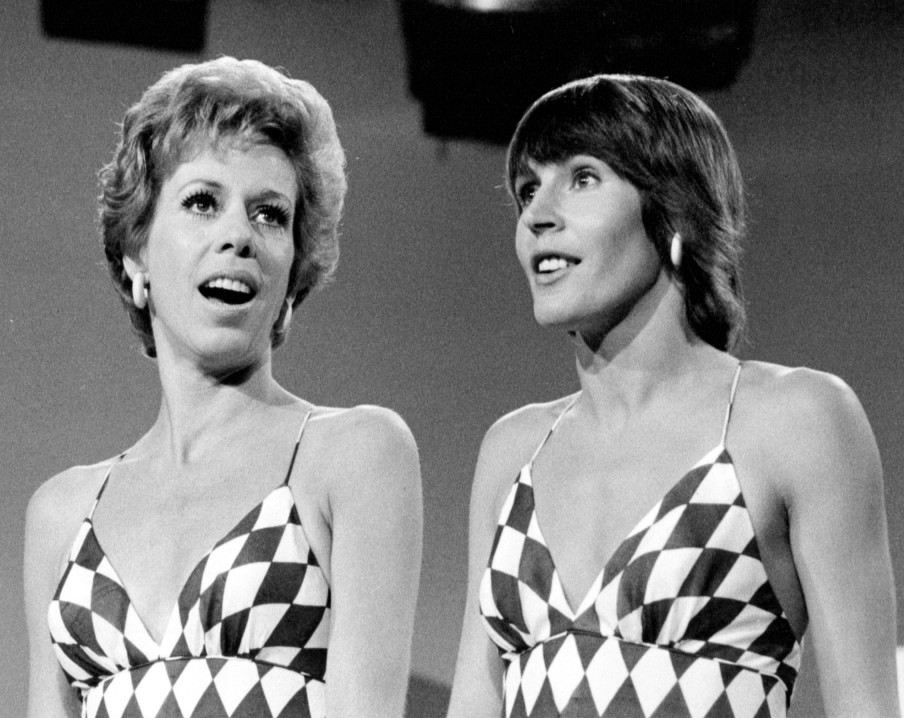
Reddy (right) with Carol Burnett, 1973

A frequent guest on talk shows and variety programs of the 1970s and early 1980s – with credits including The Bobby Darin Show, The Carol Burnett Show and The Muppet Show – Reddy helmed the 1973 summer replacement series for The Flip Wilson Show (Reddy had become friends with Flip Wilson when she worked the Chicago club circuit early in her career); the series, The Helen Reddy Show, provided early national exposure for Albert Brooks and the Pointer Sisters. She also served as the semiregular host of the late-night variety show The Midnight Special in 1975 and 1976.

Reddy's film career included a starring role in Walt Disney's Pete's Dragon, introducing the Oscar-nominated song "Candle on the Water" and the role of a nun in Airport 1975, singing her own composition "Best Friend". For her part in Airport 1975, Reddy was nominated for a Golden Globe for Most Promising Newcomer – Female. Reddy was one of many musical stars featured in the all-star chorale in the film Sgt. Pepper's Lonely Hearts Club Band (1978). She later played cameo roles in the films Disorderlies (1987) and The Perfect Host (2010).

Despite her late 1970s decline on the music charts, Reddy still had sufficient star power in 1979 to host The Helen Reddy Special, broadcast that May on ABC-TV, of which Jeff Wald was the producer. In September 1981, Reddy announced she would be shooting the pilot for her own TV sitcom, in which she would play a single mother working as a lounge singer in Lake Tahoe, but the project was abandoned. She was an occasional television guest star as an actress, appearing on the television programs The Love Boat, Fantasy Island, The Jeffersons (as herself), Diagnosis: Murder and BeastMaster.

In the mid-1980s, Reddy embarked on a new career in the theatre. She mostly worked in musicals, including Anything Goes, Call Me Madam, The Mystery of Edwin Drood and – both on Broadway and the West End – Blood Brothers. She also appeared in four productions of the one-woman show Shirley Valentine.

Reddy's notable stage roles included:

- Shirley Valentine – as Shirley, which she performed in numerous venues across the US in 1997.
- Blood Brothers – as Mrs Johnstone – Broadway (1995), West End and Liverpool.
- Love, Julie – as Gail Sinclair.
- The Mystery of Edwin Drood – as Edwin Drood/Miss Alice Nutting – Sacramento Music Circus.
- Call Me Madam – as Mrs Sally Adams – Sacramento Music Circus (August 1986).
- Anything Goes – as Reno Sweeney
  - Long Beach Civic Light Opera (July 1987).
  - Sacramento Music Circus (July 1985).
- Senior Entourage – as Helen – (May 2021).

In 2007, Reddy had a voice cameo as herself in the Family Guy television show's Star Wars parody, "Blue Harvest". In 2011, she guest-starred on Family Guy again, singing the opening theme song for the show's fictional Channel 5 News telecast.

== Personal life ==
=== Political service, citizenship ===
Reddy became a naturalised American citizen in 1974, saying after the ceremony, "I feel like I'd like to have a cup of tea and a good cry." She resumed her Australian citizenship subsequently, when the opportunity to maintain dual American–Australian citizenship became available.

Reddy was active in community affairs:

- In the 1970s, she helped raise millions of dollars for Democratic political candidates.
- In July 1977, Californian governor Jerry Brown appointed Reddy to the nine-member commission overseeing the California Department of Parks and Recreation. Her nomination was unanimously approved. She served on the commission until 1980.

=== Family ===
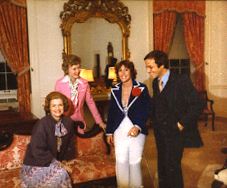
Reddy and Wald with Betty Ford in 1976

Three of Reddy's forebears left Ireland and went to Canada, Australia and New Zealand. A distant cousin, former New Zealand governor-general Patsy Reddy, is descended from their mutual New Zealand forebear.

Reddy was an enthusiastic genealogist; she researched her family's history extensively and founded the Tasmanian Genealogical Society. "Genealogy is addictive; it begins as an interest, becomes a hobby, then a passion, and finally an obsession. Not only with each generation uncovered does the number of people to investigate double, but so too does the desire to understand the forces that shaped them," she wrote in her autobiography. She was asked in an interview whether her name had any connection to the Reddy caste from India. Her response was: "I have done some research on my father's side; most of my research has been done on my mother's side. His father was born in Ireland, but his great-grandfather served with an Irish regiment stationed in India, so it is possible that I have Indian ancestry. But it has not yet been established."

At age 20, Reddy married Kenneth Claude Weate, an older musician and family friend whom she says she wed to defy her parents, who wished her to follow them into show business. The couple separated not long after the birth of their daughter, Traci.

In 1968, she married Jeff Wald, a native of the Bronx. She converted to Judaism before marrying Wald, with whom she had a son, Jordan, (Note: Original name Jordan Wald, 1972, currently Jordan Sommers) born in 1972.

A tribute on the back cover of her 1974 album Love Song for Jeffrey reads: "In memory of my mother, Stella Lamond Reddy, July 1973, my father, Max Reddy, September 1973, and my beloved aunt, Helen Reddy Sr., January 1974."

In a 1975 People interview, Reddy admitted that her relationship with then-husband and manager Wald was volatile, with the couple having "huge, healthy fights", but that she owed her success (she was then the world's biggest-selling female vocalist for two consecutive years) to Wald: "He runs it all. Naturally, when the moment of performance comes I have to deliver – but everything else is him. It's not my career; it's our career."

By 2 January 1981, Reddy and Wald had separated and he had moved into a Beverly Hills treatment facility to overcome an eight-year cocaine addiction, a US$100,000-per-year habit (US$333,621 in 2025). Reddy subsequently filed for divorce, yet withdrew her petition the day after filing it, stating: "After 13 years of marriage, a separation of one month is too short to make a decision." In 1982, after finding evidence of Wald's continued substance abuse, Reddy again separated from him and initiated divorce proceedings, which this time went through in January 1983. They agreed to shared custody of their son Jordan, but later became embroiled in a court battle after both filed for sole custody. Her son later changed his surname to Sommers and became her assistant.

In June 1983, she married Milton Ruth, a drummer in her band; the couple divorced in 1995.

=== Death ===
Reddy died at the Motion Picture & Television Country House and Hospital in Los Angeles on 29 September 2020, at age 78. She suffered from Addison's disease and dementia in her later years. No cause of death was given.

Reddy's second husband and former manager, Jeff Wald, died on 12 November 2021 at age 77.

== Portrayals ==
A biographical film about Reddy titled I Am Woman was released in 2019, in which Reddy is played by Tilda Cobham-Hervey.

The Chuck E. Cheese character Helen Henny is named after Reddy.

== Awards ==
=== American Music Awards ===
The American Music Awards (AMAs) is an annual American music awards show that commenced in 1974. Reddy won one award from four nominations.

Year	Nominee / work	Award	Result
1974	Helen Reddy	Favorite Pop/Rock Female Artist	Won
1975	Helen Reddy	Favorite Pop/Rock Female Artist	Nominated
1976	Helen Reddy	Favorite Pop/Rock Female Artist	Nominated
1977	Helen Reddy	Favorite Pop/Rock Female Artist	Nominated

=== APRA Awards ===
The APRA Awards are presented annually from 1982 by the Australasian Performing Right Association (APRA), "honouring composers and songwriters".

Year	Nominee / work	Award	Result
2021	Helen Reddy	Ted Albert Award for Outstanding Services to Australian Music	Posthumously awarded

=== ARIA Music Awards ===
The ARIA Music Awards is an annual awards ceremony since 1987 that recognises excellence, innovation, and achievement across all genres of Australian music.

Year	Nominee / work	Award	Result
2006	Helen Reddy	ARIA Hall of Fame	inducted

=== Australian Women in Music Awards ===
The Australian Women in Music Awards is an annual event that celebrates outstanding women in the Australian Music Industry who have made significant and lasting contributions in their chosen field. It commenced in 2018.

Year	Nominee / work	Award	Result
2018	Helen Reddy	AWMA Honour Roll	inducted

=== Grammy Awards ===
The Grammy Awards is an award presented annually by the Recording Academy since 1959 to recognise achievements in the music industry. Reddy has won one award from two nominations.

Year	Nominee / work	Award	Result
1973	"I Am Woman"	Best Female Pop Vocal Performance	Won
1976	"Ain't No Way to Treat a Lady"	Best Female Pop Vocal Performance	Nominated

=== People's Choice Awards ===
The People's Choice Awards is an American awards show, recognising people in entertainment, voted online by the general public and fans. The show has been held annually since 1975.

Year	Nominee / work	Award	Result
1975	Helen Reddy	Favorite Female Performer	Nominated

== Recognition ==
In December 2020, Reddy was listed at number 35 in Rolling Stone Australia's "50 Greatest Australian Artists of All Time" issue.

== Filmography ==
=== Film ===
Year	Title	Role	Notes
1974	Airport 1975	Sister Ruth	
1977	Pete's Dragon	Nora	
1978	Sgt. Pepper's Lonely Hearts Club Band	Our Guests At Heartland	
1987	Disorderlies	Happy Socialite	
2010	The Perfect Host	Cathy Knight	
2021	Senior Entourage	Helen	

=== Television ===
Year	Title	Performance	Type
1962	In Melbourne Tonight	Herself / Singer	TV series, Australia
1962	Sunnyside Up	Herself / Singer	TV series Australia, 1 episode
1965–1966	Bandstand	Herself / Singer	TV series Australia, 4 episodes
1968–1979	The Mike Douglas Show	Herself - Co-host / Herself - Singer	TV series US, 13 episodes
1970–1981	The Tonight Show with Johnny Carson	Herself / Herself - Musical Guest / Herself - Host / Herself - Guest Hostess / Herself - Guest	TV series US, 31 episodes
1970	The Sound of Music	Herself/Performer	TV series, 1 episode, Australia
1971	The Virginia Graham Show	Herself - Guest	TV series US, 1 episode
1971–1980	Dick Clark's American Bandstand	Herself / Guest / Musical Guest	TV series US, 5 episodes
1971	Make Your Own Kind Of Music!	Herself - Guest	TV series US, 1 episode
1971	The David Frost Show	Herself - Guest	TV series US, 2 episodes
1972–1977	The Carol Burnett Show	Herself - Guest / Various characters / Herself	TV series US, 6 episodes
1972–1973	The Merv Griffin Show	Herself - Guest	TV series US, 5 episodes
1972	Love! Love! Love!	Herself	TV special, US
1972	The Glen Campbell Goodtime Hour	Herself - Guest	TV series US, 1 episode
1972	The Talk of the Town	Herself - Guest	TV series US, 1 episode
1972	The John Byner Comedy Hour	Herself - Guest	TV series US, 1 episode
1972	Rollin' On The River	Herself - Guest	TV series US, 1 episode
1973	The Bobby Darin Show	Herself - Guest	TV series US, 1 episode
1973–1977	The Midnight Special	Herself - Host / Herself - Hostess / Herself - Singer	TV series US, 17 episodes
1973	Morecombe and Wise	Herself - Guest	TV series UK, 1 episode
1973	The New Bill Cosby Show	Herself - Guest	TV series US, 1 episode
1973	The 15th Annual Grammy Awards	Herself - Winner song of the year "I Am Woman"	TV special, US
1973	The Helen Reddy Show	Herself - Hostess	TV series US, 8 episodes
1973	Jerry Lewis MDA Labor Day Telethon	Herself	TV series US, 1 episode
1973	Flip	Herself	TV series US, 2 episodes
1974	American Music Awards	Herself - Host	TV special, US
1974	GTK	Herself	ABC TV series Australia, 1 episode
1974	The 16th Annual Grammy Awards	Herself	TV special, US
1974–1975	The Mac Davis Show	Herself - Guest	TV series US, 2 episodes
1975	American Guild Of Variety Artists 5th Annual Entertainer Of The Year Awards	Herself - Honoree Female Vocalist	TV special, US
1975	The Don Rickles Show - Mr. Warmth	Herself	TV special, US
1975	The Flip Wilson Special	Herself	TV special, US
1975	The 47th Annual Academy Awards	Herself - Audience member	TV special, US
1975	The Glen Campbell Music Show	Herself - Guest	TV series US, 1 episode
1975	Sammy And Company	Herself	TV series US, 1 episode
1975	Sunday Special	Herself	TV series US, 1 episode
1975–1976	Dinah!	Herself	TV series US, 3 episodes
1975	Tattletales	Herself & Jeff Wald	TV series US, 5 episodes
1975–1985	Top of the Pops	Herself - Singer	TV series UK, 5 episodes
1975	Adesso musica	Herself	TV series Italy/Germany, 1 episode
1975	Helen Reddy In Concert	Herself - Singer	TV special, UK
1975	Some Of My Best Friends Are Men	Herself	TV series US, 1 episode
1975	Helen Reddy Concert	Herself	TV Concert special, AUSTRALIA
1976	Friars Club Tribute To Gene Kelly	Herself - Performer	TV special, US
1976	Celebration: The American Spirit	Herself	TV special, US
1976	The Tonight Show With Johnny Carson	Herself - Host / Singer with Olivia Newton-John "Never Fall In Love Again"	TV series US, 1 episode
1976	The 18th Annual Grammy Awards	Herself	TV special, US
1977	The American Music Awards	Herself - Host	TV special, US
1977	Neil Diamond: Love At The Greek	Herself (uncredited)	TV special, US
1977	All You Need Is Love: The Story Of Popular Music	Herself	TV series US, 1 episode
1977	Good Morning America	Herself - Guest	TV series US, 2 episodes
1977	The National Tribute To Hubert H. Humphrey	Herself	TV special
1977	Willesee At Seven	Herself	TV series Australia, 1 episode
1978	All-Star Salute To Women's Sports	Herself	TV special, US
1978	Thank You, Rock 'N' Roll: A Tribute To Alan Freed	Herself	TV special, US
1978	The Muppet Show	Herself - Special Guest Star sings "Blue" / "We'll Sing In The Sunshine"	TV series US, 1 episode
1978	Live Wednesday	Herself	TV series US, 1 episode
1978	Sesame Street	Herself sings "Grow"	TV series US, 1 episode
1978	Australian Music To The World	Herself	TV special, Australia
1979	The 6th Annual American Music Awards	Herself	TV special, US
1979	George Burns' 100th Birthday Party	Herself	TV special, US
1979	The Helen Reddy Special	Herself - Hostess	TV special, US
1979	60 Minutes	Herself	TV series, 1 episode Australia
1980	The American Sportsman	Herself - Narrator	TV series US, 1 episode
1980	The 52nd Annual Academy Awards	Herself - Performer "It's Easy to Say" (from '10') with Dudley Moore	TV special, US
1980	The Tim Conway Show	Herself	TV series US, 1 episode
1980	The Love Boat	Elinor Green	TV series US, 1 episode
1980	The Royal Charity Gala Concert	Herself - Performer	TV special, Australia
1980	The Val Doonican Show	Herself	TV series UK, 1 episode
1980	Horas doradas	Herself	TV series Spain, 1 episode
1980	John Newcombe's Australian Stars In The States	Herself at Her home	TV special, Australia
1981	The American Music Awards	Herself	TV special, US
1981	The John Davidson Show	Herself	TV series, 1 episode
1981	Channel Nine Celebrates: 25 Years Of Television	Herself - archive clip 'Bandstand'	TV special, AUSTRALIA
1981	Solid Gold	Herself - Co-host	TV series, 2 episodes
1981	Television: Inside And Out	Herself	TV series US, 1 episode
1982	Grace Kennedy	Herself	TV series US, 1 episode
1982	Fantasy Island	Suzi Swann	TV series US, 1 episode
1982	Australian Music Stars Of The 60s	Herself - Archive clips	TV special, Australia
1982	I Love Liberty	Herself	TV special, US
1983	The American Music Awards	Herself	TV special, US
1983	The Mike Walsh Show	Guest - Herself	TV series, 1 episode
1983	Ladies Night Out	Herself	TV series UK, 1 episode
1983	Wogan	Herself - Guest	TV series UK, 1 episode
1983	Paul Squire Esq	Herself - Guest	TV series UK, 1 episode
1983	The 25th Annual Grammy Awards	Herself	TV special, US
1983	Salute!	Herself	TV series US, 1 episode
1984	Match Game/Hollywood Squares Hour	Herself - Panelist	TV series US, 5 episodes
1984	Celebrity Chefs	Herself - Guest	TV series US
1985	Puttin' On The Hits	Herself - Judge	TV series US, 1 episode
1985	American Bandstand's 33 1/3 Celebration	Herself	TV special, US
1985	The Jeffersons	Helen Reddy	TV series US, 1 episode
1986	Television: The First 30 Years	Herself	TV special, Australia
1987–1988	Hour Magazine	Herself	TV series, 2 episodes
1988	Lou Rawls Parade Of Stars	Herself	TV series US, 1 episode
1990	Home For Easter	Herself - Hostess	TV movie
1990	The Martha Warfield Show	Herself - Guest	TV series US, 1 episode
1991	Voices That Care	Herself - Choir member	TV special, US
1992	Hollywood Fantasy Christmas	Herself	TV special, US
1993	Vicki!	Herself - Guest	TV series US, 1 episode
1993	Maury Povich	Herself - Guest	TV series US, 1 episode
1995	The First 100 Years Of Cinema	Herself	TV special, US
1997	The Rosie O'Donnell Show	Herself	TV series US, 1 episode
1997; 2003	This Is Your Life? Judith Durham	Herself	TV series Australia, 1 episode
1997	When Rock Was Young: The 70s	Herself - Archive clip "I Am Woman"	TV special, Australia
1998	Intimate Portrait	Herself	TV series US, 1 episode
1998	Denise	Herself - Guest	TV series Australia, 1 episode
1998; 1999	Good Morning Australia	Herself - Guest	TV series Australia, 2 episodes
1999	M.U.G.E.N	Herself - Voice	Video Game
1999	Good Morning Australia	Herself & sister Toni Lamond sing "Breezin Along With The Breeze"	TV series Australia, 1 episode
2000	BeastMaster	The Seer	TV series US/Australia/Canada, 1 episode
2000	Diagnosis: Murder	Danielle Marsh	TV series US, 1 episode
2001	Burke's Backyard	Herself - Celebrity Gardener	TV series Australia, 1 episode
2003	This Is Your Life? Helen Reddy	Herself	TV series Australia, 1 episode
2003	Love Is In The Air	Herself	ABC TV series Australia, 1 episode "She's Leaving Home"
2003; 2011	Today Tonight	Herself - Guest	TV series Australia, 1 episode
2005	Today	Herself - Guest	TV series Australia, 1 episode
2005	Sunrise	Herself - Guest	TV series Australia, 1 episode
2005	Mornings With Kerri-Anne	Herself - Guest	TV series Australia, 1 episode
2006	The Aria Hall Of Fame	Herself - Inductee	TV special, Australia
2007; 2011	Family Guy	Channel 5 Jingle Singer / Helen Reddy	TV series US, 2 episodes
2010	Mother Of Rock Lillian Roxon	Herself	Film documentary, Australia
2010	Talking Heads	Herself - Guest	ABC TV series Australia, 1 episode
2011	Today Tonight	Herself	TV series Australia, 1 episode
2012	A Carol Burnett Christmas	Herself	Video
2013	Marie	Herself - Guest	TV series US, 1 episode
2013	Studio 10	Herself - Guest	TV series Australia, 1 episode
2013	Time Of My Life	Herself	TV Special, Australia
2014	The Morning Show	Herself - Guest	TV series Australia, 1 episode
2014	The Daily Edition	Herself - Guest	TV series Australia, 1 episode
2015	Studio 10	Herself - Health Report	TV series Australia, 1 episode
2016	The Beatles And World War II	Herself	Film documentary, UK
2017; 2018	Studio 10	Herself	TV series, 1 episode
2018	Studio 10	Herself - Archive clips	TV series Australia, 1 episode
2019	Sunrise	Herself (G'Day USA Gala)	TV series Australia, 1 episode
2019	Today	Herself (G'Day USA Gala)	TV series Australia, 1 episode
2019	The Morning Show	Herself (G'Day USA Gala)	TV series Australia, 1 episode
2019	Studio 10	Herself & Melinda Schneider (G'Day USA Gala)	TV series Australia, 1 episode
2019; 2020	10 News First	Herself & Melinda Schneider (G'Day USA Gala)	TV series Australia, 1 episode
2019; 2020	Nine News	Herself (G'Day USA Gala)	TV series Australia, 1 episode
2019; 2020	Seven News	Herself (G'Day USA Gala)	TV series Australia, 1 episode
2019; 2020	Sky News	Herself (G'Day USA Gala)	TV series Australia, 1 episode
2019; 2020	ABC News	Herself (G'Day USA Gala)	TV series Australia, 1 episode

== Discography ==
- I Don't Know How to Love Him (1971)
- Helen Reddy (1971)
- I Am Woman (1972)
- Long Hard Climb (1973)
- Love Song for Jeffrey (1974)
- Free and Easy (1974)
- No Way to Treat a Lady (1975)
- Music, Music (1976)
- Ear Candy (1977)
- We'll Sing in the Sunshine (1978)
- Reddy (1979)
- Take What You Find (1980)
- Play Me Out (1981)
- Imagination (1983)
- Feel So Young (1990)
- Center Stage (1998)
- The Best Christmas Ever (2000)

== Books ==
- Reddy, Helen (2006). The Woman I Am. Penguin Books. ISBN 978-1-58542-489-4.
