= The Collins Kids =

American rockabilly duo

The Collins Kids were an American rockabilly duo featuring Lawrencine "Lorrie" Collins (May 7, 1942 – August 4, 2018) and her younger brother Lawrence "Larry" Collins (October 4, 1944 – January 5, 2024). Their hits in the 1950s as youngsters, such as "Hop, Skip and Jump", "Beetle Bug Bop" and "Hoy Hoy", were geared towards children, but their infectious singing and playing crossed over generations. Larry, a lightning-fingered guitar whiz at age ten, was known for playing a double-neck Mosrite guitar like his mentor, Joe Maphis.

== Career ==
In 1955, the Collins Kids signed to Columbia Records. The Collins Kids became regular performers on Town Hall Party in 1954 and on the syndicated for television version of the show, Tex Ritter's Ranch Party, which ran from 1957 to 1959.

It was on Town Hall Party that Ricky Nelson first saw Lorrie Collins, and soon after they began dating. In a 1958 episode of The Adventures of Ozzie and Harriet, Lorrie played both Ricky's girlfriend and that girlfriend's sister. Ricky unsuccessfully lobbied to make Lorrie a part of the show.

In 1959, the Collins Kids were touring with Johnny Cash, when Lorrie met Cash's manager and future husband Stu Carnall.

The Collins siblings continued to perform together in the mid-1960s, appearing as regulars on the Canadian music program Star Route and making a guest appearance on the 8 September 1965, edition of Shindig!. (Note: As of 6 September 2010, clips of these performances were available on YouTube.)

Larry wrote a number of well-known songs including "Delta Dawn" and "You're the Reason God Made Oklahoma"; some in partnership with songwriter Alexander Harvey. (Note: Harvey was originally listed as “Alex Harvey” in the song credits, but now goes by “Alexander” to avoid confusion with Scottish rocker Alex Harvey.)

=== Reunion ===
The duo reunited for a rockabilly revival concert in England in 1993 and performed together until Lorrie's death in 2018. They appeared at Deke Dickerson's Guitar Geek Festival in Anaheim, California on January 19, 2008, with their nephew Dakota Collins, who played upright bass as an addition to the Collins band.

== Selected discography ==
- Rockin' Rollin' Collins Kids [LP] (Bear Family BFX-15074, 1981)
- The Collins Kids, Vol. 2 [LP] (Bear Family BFX-15108, 1983)
- Introducing Larry And Lorrie: The Collins Kids [LP/CD] (Epic PE-38457, 1983)
- Hop, Skip & Jump [2CD] (Bear Family BCD-15537, 1991)
- The Rockin'est [CD] (Bear Family BCD-16250, 1997)
- Rockin' And Boppin' [CD] (Jasmine JASMCD-3709, 2018)
