= I Am Woman =

Single by Helen Reddy

from the album I Am Woman
- B-side: "More Than You Could Take"
- Released: May 1972
- Recorded: 1971 (original); 23 April 1972 (re-release)
- Genre: Pop; soft rock
- Length: 3:24
- Label: Capitol
- Songwriters: Ray Burton; Helen Reddy
- Producer: Jay Senter

Helen Reddy singles chronology
"No Sad Song" (1972)	"I Am Woman" (1972)	"Peaceful" (1973)

Alternative release
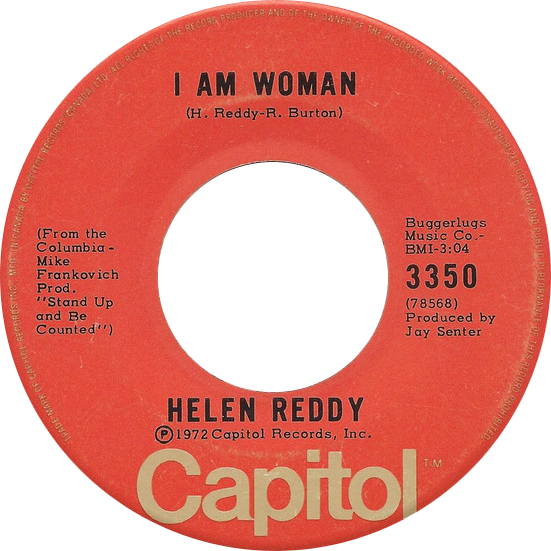
- One of Canadian pressings

"I Am Woman" is a song written by Australian musicians Helen Reddy and Ray Burton. Performed by Reddy, the first recording of "I Am Woman" appeared on her debut album I Don't Know How to Love Him, released in May 1971, and was heard during the closing credits for the 1972 film Stand Up and Be Counted. A new recording of the song was released as a single in May 1972 and became a number-one hit later that year, eventually selling over one million copies. The song came near the apex of the counterculture era and, by celebrating female empowerment, became an enduring feminist anthem for the women's liberation movement. Following Reddy's death in September 2020, the song peaked at number 2 on the Australian digital sales chart. In 2025, the 1972 re-recording of "I Am Woman" was selected by the United States Library of Congress for preservation in the National Recording Registry.

== Inspiration for the song ==
After securing a recording contract in 1971 with Capitol Records that yielded the hit "I Don't Know How to Love Him", Reddy – then living in Los Angeles – was asked for an album. She gave the label a set of 10 jazz-tinged pop songs. Nestled among the Leon Russell, Graham Nash and Van Morrison songs were two Reddy and Ray Burton originals. "I Am Woman" was one of them. The composition was the result of Reddy's search for a song that would express her growing passion for female empowerment. In a 2003 interview in Australia's Sunday Magazine (published with the Sunday Herald Sun and Sunday Telegraph), she explained:

I couldn't find any songs that said what I thought being woman was about. I thought about all these strong women in my family who had gotten through the Depression and world wars and drunken, abusive husbands. But there was nothing in music that reflected that. The only songs were "I Feel Pretty" or that dreadful song "Born a Woman". (The 1966 hit by Sandy Posey had observed that if you're born a woman "you're born to be stepped on, lied to, cheated on and treated like dirt. I'm glad it happened that way".) These are not exactly empowering lyrics. I certainly never thought of myself as a songwriter, but it came down to having to do it.

Reddy's own long years on stage had also fuelled her contempt for men who belittled women, she said. "Women have always been objectified in showbiz. I'd be the opening act for a comic and as I was leaving the stage he'd say, 'Yeah, take your clothes off and wait for me in the dressing room, I'll be right there'. It was demeaning and humiliating for any woman to have that happen publicly."

Reddy credits the song as having supernatural inspiration. She said: "I remember lying in bed one night and the words, 'I am strong, I am invincible, I am woman', kept going over and over in my head. That part I consider to be divinely inspired. I had been chosen to get a message across." Pressed on who had chosen her, she replied: "The universe." The next day she wrote the lyric and handed it to Australian guitarist Ray Burton to put it to music.

== Collaboration with Ray Burton ==
Burton, 26 at the time and playing in Los Angeles with Australian rock band the Executives (and later the founding member of Ayers Rock), was a friend who had often worked with Reddy in live venues across Australia. He has a different recollection of the song's beginning. He told Sunday Magazine that he spoke to Reddy after she hosted a series of regular women's meetings at which he says they would "sit around and whine about their boyfriends".

I said to Helen, 'If you're so serious about the whole thing, why don't you jot down some lyrics and I'll make it a song?' And that's pretty much what happened. She gave me lyrics scribbled down on a piece of paper and I went home that Sunday night and wrote the whole song in about three hours. Her lyrics were more in prose or poetic form, so I rewrote a few bits of it. I had a bit of a melody in my head anyway, so I reconstructed it, then moulded the lyrics to fit that melody. I did a demo on a Revox reel-to-reel tape. She really liked it and she recorded it on an album for Capitol Records. I never thought of it as being one of my better songs. It had commercial potential and I knew the women's lib thing was bubbling and coming to the boil in the U.S.A.. The life of a songwriter from Australia in Los Angeles was not very lucrative, so I figured it was a way to make a few dollars and up the quality of my life. I had a hunch that it was bound to be a hit. Then it went on the Capitol album and just sat there as a "sleeper" and I thought, 'Well, maybe I was wrong'.

Reddy insists Burton did not change a word of the lyrics.

== Making of the single ==
Reddy had no expectations for the track. "It clearly was not hit-single material and got no airplay at all. I used it as an opening song whenever I performed live, and it was always well received: I also noticed that the song was being singled out for mention in fan mail." But more than a year later, the song was picked to run behind the opening credits of Stand Up and Be Counted, a lightweight Hollywood women's lib comedy starring Jacqueline Bisset, Loretta Swit and Steve Lawrence. "The decision-makers at Capitol Records thought that, in case the film was a hit, they should release 'I Am Woman' as a single." In its initial form, the original version ran to little more than two minutes, so Reddy was asked to write an additional verse and chorus. The extra verse inserted the song's only reference to men ("Until I make my brother understand").

The recording session for this new version took place on 23 April 1972. Reddy told Sunday Magazine she remembered nothing about it and did not know which musicians played on the song. In fact, she had some of the best LA session musicians backing her:

- Mike Deasy: guitar
- Jim Horn: woodwind; strings and horns arrangement
- Jim Gordon: drums
- Michael Melvoin: piano
- Leland Sklar: bass
- Dick "Slide" Hyde: trombone
- Don Menza: saxophone
- Kathy Deasy (whose credits included Johnny Rivers, Kenny Loggins and the Byrds): backup vocals

Producer Jay Senter assembled the rhythm section at SunWest Studios for a 7:00 p.m. downbeat (start) but since he had planned on tracking without Reddy, she was not told to arrive until 9:00 p.m. Reddy and (then) husband Jeff Wald arrived thinking they were going to track (record) live with the band, but Senter and the band had already recorded the track as well as its intended B-side, "Don't Mess with a Woman". Wald and Reddy were furious in the control room. Senter was clearly not happy, either, and voices were raised, but he did not quit the project. Reddy put her voice on the track that Senter produced, and she and Wald left the studio. That release triggered a five-figure payment to Reddy, which at the time was sorely needed, according to Wald.

Immediately after that, guitarist Deasy played the riff on his 12-string electric guitar that became the signature sound for the song. Senter then asked friend and sax man Jim Horn to write string and horn charts to be recorded the following week, while Senter went into the studio with Clydie King, Venetta Fields and Shirley Matthews (the Blossoms) and layered the background vocals.

== Success ==
As it turned out, "it was the original recording of 'I Am Woman' that was featured on the soundtrack" of the film, which "opened and closed the same week" in May 1972. The new recording of the song was released as a single on the 22nd of the month, and Wald – who had worked the phones for 18 hours a day urging radio stations to play "I Don't Know How to Love Him" – again put his promotional skills to use. He lined up gigs for Reddy – by now heavily pregnant with son Jordan – to sing on 19 TV talk and variety shows, and "women began calling radio stations and requesting the song, thereby forcing airplay."

Despite the chord it was striking with television viewers, the song's trek to the top of the charts was still a long, hard climb. It first entered the Billboard Hot 100 at number 99 in the issue of the magazine dated 24 June 1972, peaked at number 97 two weeks later, fell off the Hot 100, re-entered at number 87 two months later in the 16 September issue, and reached number one three months later, in the 9 December issue.

Upon the release of the single, Record World called it a "typically sensitive, professional performance from the fine Australian songstress."

"I Am Woman" was the first number one single for Capitol Records since "Ode to Billie Joe" by Bobbie Gentry five years earlier, in 1967. It was the first number one hit on the Billboard chart by an Australian-born artist and the first Australian-penned song to win a Grammy Award (in her acceptance speech for Best Female Performance, Reddy thanked "God, because She makes everything possible"). It also became the second Helen Reddy hit – after "I Don't Know How to Love Him" – to peak at number two in her native Australia. Overlooked in its original UK release, "I Am Woman" was given a 1975 reissue to serve as the follow-up to Reddy's number five UK hit "Angie Baby" but did not gain enough momentum to reach the UK Top 50.

== Impact and legacy ==
In the year that Gloria Steinem's Ms. magazine was launched in the US and Cleo in Australia, the song quickly captured the imagination of the burgeoning woman's movement. National Organization for Woman founder Betty Friedan was later to write that in 1973, a gala entertainment night in Washington DC at the NOW annual convention closed with the playing of "I Am Woman". "Suddenly," she said, "women got out of their seats and started dancing around the hotel ballroom and joining hands in a circle that got larger and larger until maybe a thousand of us were dancing and singing, 'I am strong, I am invincible, I am woman.' It was a spontaneous, beautiful expression of the exhilaration we all felt in those years, women really moving as women."

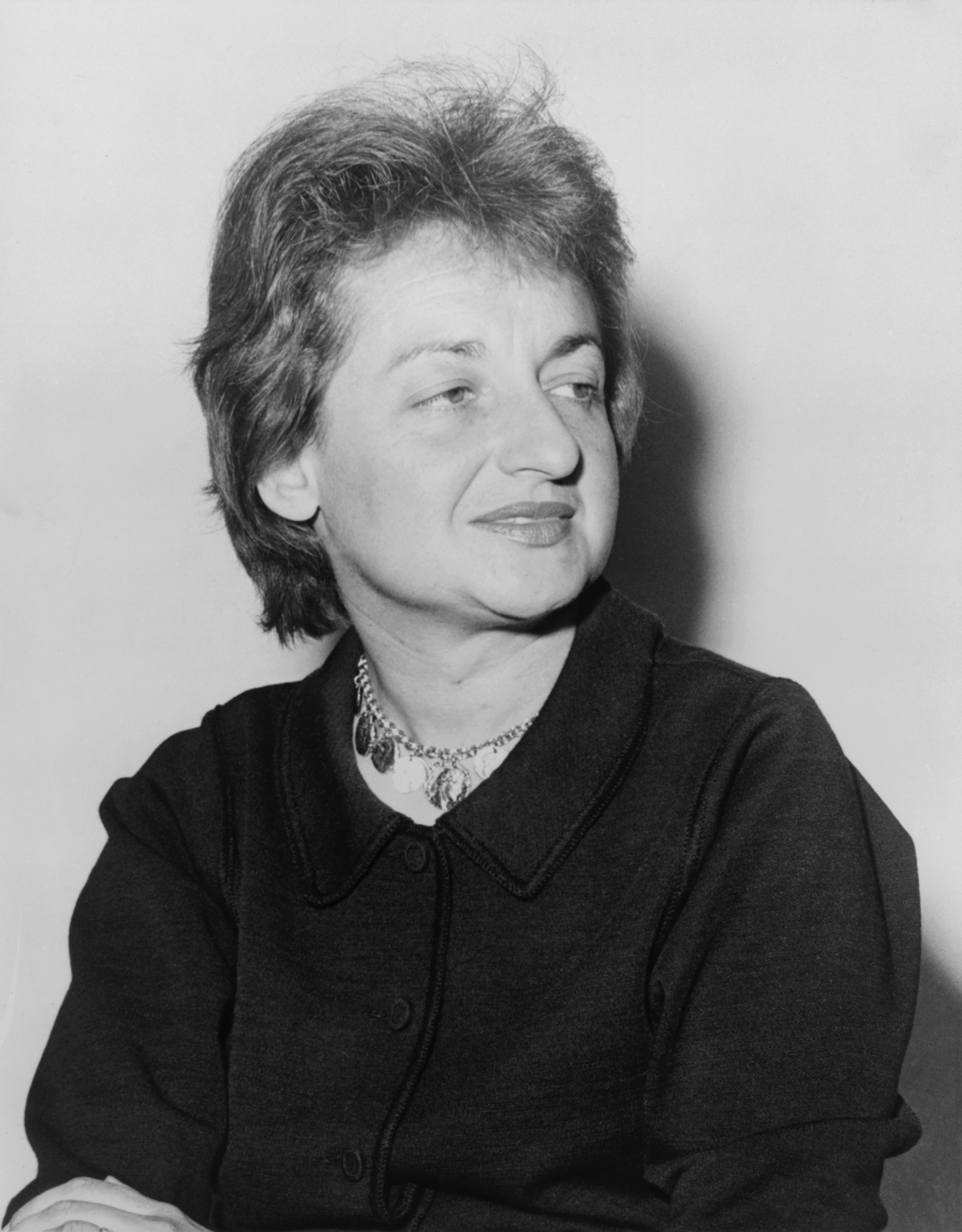
Betty Friedan, 1960

Some feminists took exception to the lyrics, "I'm still an embryo, with a long, long way to go," identifying the women's liberation movement with a pregnancy. This was particularly true after the 1973 U.S. Roe v. Wade Supreme Court decision was bookended by Paul Anka's 1974 number-one hit, "Having My Baby."

To Reddy, the song's message reaches beyond feminism. "It's not just for women," she said. "It's a general empowerment song about feeling good about yourself, believing in yourself. When my former brother-in-law, a doctor, was going to medical school he played it every morning just to get him going." In 2002, however, she said, "I had no idea what the song was destined to become. If I'd known, I would have been far too intimidated to have written it."

The song brought greater exposure to Reddy, paving the way for a succession of hit singles. It also generated tremendous wealth, which the couple flaunted with a gaudy lifestyle of mansions, limousines, jewelry and speedboats. In her tell-all Hollywood book, You'll Never Eat Lunch in This Town Again, Julia Phillips claimed that by the time the couple completed their acrimonious divorce in 1982 they had blown most of the $40 million they had made.

When Reddy's performance of the song at the 1981 Miss World contest infuriated feminists, she responded: "Let them step forward and pay my rent and I'll stay home. What I'm doing is advertising a product I wouldn't use."

Reddy had been quoted as saying, "To this day I get mail from women who say, I went to law school because of your song. But I would hate to think out of the wide spectrum of things I have done in my career, that's all I would be remembered for." But in her autobiography, The Woman I Am: A Memoir, she recalls a 2000 encounter with a friend's high-school-aged nephew who said that "in his assigned Modern American History textbook, in a section on the rise of feminism in the 70s, I was mentioned along with the printed lyrics to 'I Am Woman'." It became her excuse for what, in 2002, she called her retirement: "I thought, 'Well, I'm part of history now. And how do I top that? I can't top that.' So, it was an easy [decision to stop singing]." But in a 2014 interview celebrating her return to the stage, Ernie Manouse asked about the song, "Ever regret it because it's so iconic? Does it overshadow everything else? Because people forget how many hit songs you had, and yet this song becomes so big. Is it ever too much to have on your back?" Reddy begins, "No, no," and after a pause says, "I'm proud of it."

The song's opening line, "I am woman, hear me roar" has become widely referenced in media. In a 1975 episode of The Carol Burnett Show, guest Jean Stapleton played a feminist who proudly announces, "I am woman!" to which Harvey Korman's character replies, "I know. I heard your roar." During the 2000 Republican presidential campaign of Elizabeth Dole one GOP consultant complained that, "she has to have a message beyond 'I am woman, hear me roar.'"

A biopic of Reddy's life, titled after the song, was announced in mid-2016 with Unjoo Moon as director, and finally saw release in 2020. At the 2020 ARIA Music Awards held in late November, the song was performed in tribute to the late Reddy by an ensemble of Australian female singers. They were introduced by former Prime Minister, Julia Gillard, and were backed by a virtual choir of more than twenty female singers.

== Fallout with Burton ==
Expelled from the US in 1971 because of work-permit problems, Ray Burton watched the song's rise in the US from a distance. Burton ended up living on unemployment benefits. "It could have been the launching pad for a writing and singing career," he said. "They took advantage of the fact I wasn't there."

He claimed he was forced to take legal action against the singer in 1998 to recover a portion of songwriter royalties that had been withheld from him since 1972. He said: "I got some money out of it, but nothing like it would have been in the '70s when it was riding high."

Reddy disputes Burton's claims. "There was a buyout 25 or 30 years ago," she told Sunday Magazine. "Neither of us had any idea the song would become what it became. About 10 years ago he got in touch with me because he was in financial difficulties. I felt sorry for him and reinstated his songwriter royalties. His passport problems ended any hope he had of a career in the States and somehow that bitterness got transferred to me. I wish him well. I bear him no animosity."

Today he performs again in venues on the Queensland Gold Coast, where he lives. Sometimes he includes it in his set, raising a laugh from audiences by saying, "Here's a song I wrote in the '70s, with a twist." He sings it as, "She is woman, hear her roar".

== In popular culture ==
Reddy's description of the "typical DJ reaction" to the song is quoted in The Billboard Book of Number One Hits: 'I can't stand this record! I hate this song! But you know, it's a funny thing, my wife loves it!'

During the Audience Talent Show Night segment of the episode of Late Show with David Letterman dated 20 April 1995, Reddy was seated in the back of the audience and asked by Letterman what her talent was. She replied, "Hit it, Paul," as she took the mic from Letterman's hand and began singing "I Am Woman." The audience responded enthusiastically as the host cut to a commercial, but Reddy interrupted at several points throughout the show in different locations to break into her signature song: first in the window behind Letterman's desk and then during an interview with Nicolas Cage, a supposed commercial, and a performance by Blues Traveler. Whenever the music cut off and she was dismissed from the stage, she would always smile, wave and say, "Thank you."

In 2006, Burger King released an ad campaign titled "Manthem" featuring "I Am Man", a parody of Helen Reddy's song, to promote its Texas Double Whopper hamburger.

In 2010, the song was performed by the main characters of Sex and the City 2 during a karaoke scene.

== Charts ==
=== Weekly charts ===
Chart (1972–1973)	Peak position
Australia (Kent Music Report)	2
Canada (RPM) Top Singles	1
Canada (RPM Adult Contemporary)	4
US (Billboard Hot 100)	1
US (Billboard Adult Contemporary)	2
US Cash Box Top 100	1

Chart (2020)	Peak position
Australia Digital Song Sales (Billboard)	2

=== Year-end charts ===
Chart (1972)	Rank
Australia	13
Canada Top Singles (RPM)	7
US (Joel Whitburn's Pop Annual)	14

== Certifications ==
Region	Certification	Certified units/sales
United States (RIAA)	Gold	1,000,000^{^}
^{^} Shipments figures based on certification alone.

== Other versions ==
"I Am Woman" was a minor C&W hit for Bobbie Roy who like Reddy was on the Capitol Records roster; Roy's version of "I Am Woman" reached #51 on the US C&W chart and #85 in Canada in February 1973.

An instrumental arrangement of the song was played at the 82nd Academy Awards as the exit music for Kathryn Bigelow after she won the Best Director Oscar for the 2009 film The Hurt Locker, the first time a woman won the award.
