= Another Time (Earth, Wind & Fire album) =

Compilation album by Earth, Wind & Fire
- Released: September 1974
- Recorded: 1970–1971
- Genres: Funk; soul; jazz fusion
- Length: 63:42
- Label: Warner Bros.
- Producer: Joe Wissert

Earth, Wind & Fire chronology
Open Our Eyes (1974)	Another Time (1974)	That's the Way of the World (1975)

Another Time is the first compilation album by American band Earth, Wind & Fire, released in September 1974 on Warner Bros. Records. It reached No. 29 on the Billboard Top Soul Albums chart.

== Overview ==
Another Time was issued as a double album that reissues the band's first two albums, Earth, Wind & Fire (1971) and The Need of Love (1971) in their entirety, albeit in a different running order, and adds the previously unreleased track, "Handwriting on the Wall".

== Critical reception ==
Professional ratings
Review scores
Source	Rating
Allmusic	3/5 stars
Billboard	(favourable)

Ron Wynn of Allmusic described the songs on Another Time as "certainly worth hearing again". Billboard called the album "enjoyable".

== Track listing ==
No.	Title	Writer(s)	Original album	Length
Side one
1.	"Fan The Fire"	Wade Flemons, Maurice White, Don Whitehead	Earth, Wind & Fire	4:59
2.	"Moment of Truth"	Wade Flemons, Maurice White, Don Whitehead	Earth, Wind & Fire	3:08
3.	"Love Is Life"	Wade Flemons, Maurice White, Don Whitehead	Earth, Wind & Fire	5:02
4.	"Help Somebody"	Wade Flemons, Maurice White, Don Whitehead	Earth, Wind & Fire	3:37
Side two
5.	"C'mon Children"	Michael Beal, Wade Flemons, Maurice White, Verdine White, Don Whitehead	Earth, Wind & Fire	3:08
6.	"Handwriting On The Wall"	Michael Beal, Wade Flemons, Maurice White, Verdine White, Don Whitehead	Previously unreleased	4:04
7.	"This World Today"	Wade Flemons, Maurice White, Don Whitehead	Earth, Wind & Fire	3:33
8.	"Bad Tune"	Michael Beal, Wade Flemons, Maurice White, Verdine White, Don Whitehead	Earth, Wind & Fire	4:31
Side three
9.	"I Can Feel It In My Bones"	Wade Flemons, Maurice White, Don Whitehead	The Need of Love	5:04
10.	"I Think About Lovin' You"	Sherry Scott	The Need of Love	5:59
11.	"Everything Is Everything"	Richard Evans, Ric Powell, Phil Upchurch	The Need of Love	6:42
Side four
12.	"Beauty"	Wade Flemons, Maurice White, Don Whitehead	The Need of Love	4:15
13.	"Energy"	Wade Flemons, Sherry Scott, Maurice White, Don Whitehead	The Need of Love	9:40

== Personnel ==
Credits adapted from album's text.

- Maurice White - vocals, kalimba, drums, percussion
- Wade Flemons - vocals
- Don Whitehead - piano, electric piano and vocals
- Sherry Scott - vocals
- Verdine White - bass
- Michael Beal - guitar, harmonica
- Yakov Ben Israel - congas, percussion
- Chet Washington - tenor sax
- Alex Thomas - trombone

== Charts ==
Chart (1974)	Peak position
US Top LPs & Tape (Billboard)	97
US Top Soul LPs (Billboard)	29
