= That's the Way of the World: Alive in '75 =

Live album by Earth, Wind & Fire
- Released: April 23, 2002
- Recorded: May 10–24, 1975
- Studios: Nassau Coliseum, Long Island, New York, NY; Baltimore Civic Center, Baltimore, Maryland
- Genre: R&B
- Length: 54:33
- Label: Columbia/Legacy
- Producers: Maurice White, Paul Klingberg, Leo Sacks

Earth, Wind & Fire chronology
The Ultimate Collection (1999)	That's the Way of the World: Alive in '75 (2002)	The Essential Earth, Wind & Fire (2002)

That's the Way of the World: Alive in '75 is a live album by American band Earth, Wind & Fire issued in April 2002 on Columbia/Legacy records.

== Critical reception ==
Professional ratings
Review scores
Source	Rating
Allmusic	3/5 stars
PopMatters	(favorable)
Detroit Free Press	3/4 stars

Mark Anthony Neal of Popmatters called the album "a worthwhile investment." With a 3 out of 5 star rating Stephen Thomas Erlewine of Allmusic noted "That's the Way of the World may not have the ebb and flow of a proper live set, but it does have the advantage of burning bright consistently throughout the record." He also called the album "a fun record, something that the group's fans -- particularly those who loved the group's early peak years -- will surely dig."

== Track listing ==
No.	Title	Writer(s)	Length
1.	"Overture"	Maurice White	0:56
2.	"Shining Star"	Philip Bailey, Larry Dunn, M. White	5:34
3.	"Happy Feelin'"	Bailey, Dunn, Al McKay, M. White, Verdine White	5:37
4.	"Yearnin' Learnin'"	Bailey, Charles Stepney, M. White	4:55
5.	"Sun Goddess featuring Ramsey Lewis"	Jon Lind, M. White	7:38
6.	"Interlude"	M. White	0:54
7.	"Evil"	Bailey, M. White	3:01
8.	"Kalimba Story"	M. White, V. White	6:58
9.	"Reasons"	Bailey, Stepney, M. White	9:40
10.	"Mighty Mighty"	M. White, V. White	4:48
11.	"That's the Way of the World"	Stepney, M. White, V. White	8:30
