= That's the Way of the World =

Soundtrack album / Studio album by Earth, Wind & Fire
- Released: March 3, 1975
- Recorded: September 16 – October 2, 1974
- Studios: Caribou Ranch (Nederland, Colorado); Sunset Sound (Los Angeles); Hollywood Sound Recorders (Hollywood); The Burbank Studios (Burbank, California)
- Genres: Soul; funk; progressive soul; pop
- Length: 38:23
- Label: Columbia
- Producers: Maurice White, Charles Stepney

Earth, Wind & Fire chronology
Another Time (1974)	That's the Way of the World (1975)	Gratitude (1975)

Singles from That's the Way of the World
- 1. "Shining Star" Released: January 21, 1975; 2. "That's the Way of the World" Released: June 17, 1975

That's the Way of the World is the sixth studio album by American band Earth, Wind & Fire, released on March 3, 1975, by Columbia Records. This was also the soundtrack for a 1975 motion picture of the same name. The album rose to No. 1 on both the Billboard 200 and Top Soul Albums charts. That's the Way of the World has also been certified Triple Platinum in the U.S. by the RIAA.

== Overview ==
That's the Way of the World was produced by both EWF leader Maurice White and Charles Stepney. The album spent three weeks atop the Billboard 200 chart. That's the Way of the World also stayed on top of the Billboard Top Soul Albums chart for five weeks altogether.

That's the Way of the World was reissued in 1999 with a new song called "Caribou Chaser (Jazzy Jam)". As well as four bonus demos and three live tracks. A live version of the album, recorded in 1975 and entitled That's the Way of the World: Alive in '75, was released in 2002. The album took nine months to record and mix.

== Singles ==
The single "Shining Star" reached number one on both the Billboard Hot 100 and Hot Soul Singles charts. "Shining Star" went on to win a Grammy Award for Best R&B Performance by a Duo or Group with Vocals at the 18th Annual Grammy Awards. The album's title track reached No. 5 on the Billboard Hot Soul Singles chart and No. 12 on the Hot 100 chart.

== Critical reception ==
Professional ratings
Review scores
Source	Rating
Allmusic	4.5/5 stars
Variety	(favorable)
Village Voice	(B+)
Boston Globe	(favourable)
Rolling Stone	(mixed)
Vibe	(favorable)
LA Weekly	(favourable)
Stereo Review	(favorable)
Chicago Tribune	(favourable)
BBC	(favourable)

Stephen Curwood of the Boston Globe said "these guys are great and this is a sound you shouldn't miss". Variety exclaimed "Earth, Wind & Fire turn their multi-voiced big soul sound loose on eight solid numbers". Daryl Easlea of the BBC wrote "Seen as a meditation on the rules of living, the album is nothing less than a spiritual soul masterpiece." He added "leader Maurice White synthesised all the elements of the group so far – straight-up funk, African mysticism, jazz and sublime balladry, and made a brief, focused album." Chris Albertson of Stereo Review described the band's performance as a "disco delight" and the recording itself as "excellent". Alex Henderson of Allmusic noted That's the Way of the World is "EWF's crowning achievement". Gordon Fletcher of Rolling Stone said "Lousy production works to this LP's detriment — Maurice White has surprisingly chosen to have the entire album sound hot." Fletcher added "Great tunes (particularly the dynamic "Africano") and great musicianship are not what this one lacks — hopefully the next time out White will be able to tone things down accordingly in the places where a little under-statement is appropriate." LA Weekly called the LP "Serious romantic music to wear silk bellbottom slacks to." Clarence Page of the Chicago Tribune wrote "Their new album That's the Way of the World [Columbia], exploits the moods, if not the explosive instrumental power, that made their last platter 'Open Our Eyes,' a smash hit." Robert Christgau of the Village Voice found that "Here ethnomusicology and colloquial homiletics are tacked onto the funk and soul and doowop and jazz, which makes for an instructive contrast -the taped-in-Africa Matepe Ensemble, whose spontaneous laughter closes out the coda, versus Maurice White, whose humorless platitutdes prove there's more to roots than turning a mbira into an ersatz vibraphone." Vibe also proclaimed "That's the Way of the World coursed effortlessly through a myriad of genres, from rock to jazz to funk to heavy African influences".

That's the Way of the World was nominated in 1976 and 1977 for an American Music Award for Favorite Soul/R&B Album. EWF also won a Rock Music Award for That's the Way of the World in the category of Best Rhythm and Blues Album.

In 2004, That's the Way of the World was inducted into the Grammy Hall of Fame. In 2012, Rolling Stone placed the album at 486 on its list of the 500 greatest albums of all time, calling it "make-out music of the gods". For the 2020 update of the list, the album's rank climbed to number 420.

== Track listing ==
=== Original issue ===
Side one
No.	Title	Writer(s)	Length
1.	"Shining Star"	Philip Bailey, Larry Dunn, Maurice White	2:50
2.	"That's the Way of the World"	Charles Stepney, Verdine White, M. White	5:45
3.	"Happy Feelin'"	Al McKay, V. White, P. Bailey, L. Dunn, M. White	3:35
4.	"All About Love"	L. Dunn, M. White	6:35

Side two
No.	Title	Writer(s)	Length
5.	"Yearnin' Learnin'"	P. Bailey, C. Stepney, M. White	3:39
6.	"Reasons"	P. Bailey, C. Stepney, M. White	4:59
7.	"Africano"	L. Dunn, M. White	5:09
8.	"See the Light"	Louise Anglin, P. Bailey, L. Dunn	6:18

1999 Legacy reissue
No.	Title	Writer(s)	Length
1.	"Shining Star"	P. Bailey, L. Dunn, M. White, V. White, S. Burke	2:50
2.	"That's the Way of the World"	C. Stepney, V. White, M. White	5:45
3.	"Happy Feelin'"	A. McKay, V. White, P. Bailey, L. Dunn, M. White	3:35
4.	"All About Love"	L. Dunn, M. White	6:35
5.	"Yearnin' Learnin'"	P. Bailey, C. Stepney, M. White	3:39
6.	"Reasons"	P. Bailey, C. Stepney, M. White	4:59
7.	"Africano"	L. Dunn, M. White	5:09
8.	"See the Light"	L. Anglin, P. Bailey, L. Dunn	6:18
9.	"Shining Star (Future Star) [Original Sketches]"	L. Dunn, M. White, P. Bailey	1:05
10.	"All About Love (First Impression) [Original Sketches]"	L. Dunn, M. White	3:12
11.	"Happy Feelin' (Anatomy of a Groove) [Original Sketches]"	P. Bailey, L. Dunn, A. McKay, M. White, V. White	3:31
12.	"Caribou Chaser (Jazzy Jam) [Original Sketches]"	L. Dunn, M. White	1:39
13.	"That's the Way of the World (Latin Expedition) [Original Sketches]"	C. Stepney, M. White, V. White	1:41

That's the Way of the World Live
No.	Title	Writer(s)	Length
1.	"Shining Star" (Live 1975)	P. Bailey, L. Dunn, M. White	4:56
2.	"That's the Way of the World" (Live in Houston, Texas - 1982)	C. Stepney, V. White, M. White	7:37
3.	"Happy Feelin'" (Live at the Civic Arena, Pittsburgh, Pennsylvania - May 1975)	A. McKay, V. White, P. Bailey, L. Dunn, M. White	5:37

== Personnel ==
- Bass – Verdine White
- Conductor – Saini Murira (track 8)
- Congas – Philip Bailey
- Drums – Fred White, Maurice White, Ralph Johnson
- Flute, Soprano saxophone, Tenor saxophone – Andrew P. Woolfolk
- Guitar – Al McKay, Johnny Graham
- Kalimba – Maurice White
- Moog synthesizer, Piano, Organ, All Keyboards – Larry Dunn
- Percussion – Al McKay, Fred White, Maurice White, Philip Bailey, Ralph Johnson, Verdine White
- Additional Saxophone – Ernie Watts
- Strings – Saini Murira & Matepe Ensemble (track 8)
- Trombone – George Bohanon
- Trumpet – Oscar Brashear
- Vocals – Maurice White, Philip Bailey, Verdine White

== Production ==
- Producer – Maurice White (Original), Leo Sacks (Reissue)
- Co-producer – Charles Stepney (Original)
- Recording Engineer – George Massenburg (1–8), Curt Wittig (8)
- Mixing – George Massenburg (1–8), Maurice White (9–13), Paul Klingberg (9–13), Leo Sacks (9–13)
- Mixed at Hollywood Sound Recorders (Hollywood, California).
- Mastered at Kendun Recorders (Burbank, California).
- Art Direction – Howard Fritzen
- Design – Stephen Newman and Shusei Nagaoka
- Photography – Norman Seeff
- Musical Arrangements – Earth, Wind & Fire and Charles Stepney

== Charts and certifications ==
=== Charts ===
Album
Chart (1975)	Peak position
US Top LPs & Tape (Billboard)	1
US Top Soul LPs (Billboard)	1
Canada RPM Top Albums	15

==== Year-end charts ====
Chart (1975)	Peak position
US Top Soul LPs (Billboard)	1

Singles
Year	Single	Chart	Position
1975	"Shining Star"	Billboard Hot Soul Singles	1
1975	"Shining Star"	Billboard Hot 100	1
1975	"That's the Way of the World"	Billboard Hot Soul Singles	5
1975	"That's the Way of the World"	Billboard Hot 100	12

=== Certifications ===
Country	Award
US (RIAA)	Triple Platinum

== Accolades ==
Publication	Accolade	Year	Rank
Pause & Play	Albums Inducted into a Time Capsule, One Album per Week	2008	*
Robert Dimery	1001 Albums You Must Hear Before You Die	2005	*
Rolling Stone	The 500 Greatest Albums of All Time	2012	486
Rolling Stone	The 500 Greatest Albums of All Time	2020	420
The Recording Academy	Grammy Hall of Fame	2004	*
Vibe Magazine	51 Albums Representing a Generation, a Sound and a Movement	2004	*
Rickey Vincent	Five Star Albums from Funk: The Music, The People, and The Rhythm of The One	1996	*
National Association of Recording Merchandisers and The Rock and Roll Hall of Fame	The Definitive 200	2007	187
Soultracks	The Greatest Soul Albums of the 1970s	2009	1
(*) designates lists that are unordered.

== See also ==
- List of number-one albums of 1975 (U.S.)
- List of number-one R&B albums of 1975 (U.S.)
- Billboard Year-End
