= Mom (Earth, Wind & Fire song) =

Single by Earth, Wind & Fire

from the album Last Days and Time
- B-side: "Power"
- Released: November 1972
- Recorded: 1972
- Genre: R&B; soul
- Length: 5:49 (album version); 3:44 (single version)
- Label: Columbia
- Songwriters: Maurice White; Verdine White
- Producer: Joe Wissert

Earth, Wind & Fire singles chronology
"I Think About Lovin' You" (1971)	"Mom" (1972)	"Evil" (1973)

"Mom" is a song by the band Earth, Wind & Fire released as a single in November 1972 by Columbia Records. The song peaked at No. 39 on the Cashbox Top R&B Songs chart.

== Overview ==
"Mom" was produced by Joe Wissert and composed by Maurice White with Verdine White. The single's b-side was a song called Power. Both Mom and Power came from Earth, Wind & Fire's 1972 album Last Days and Time.

== Critical reception ==
Billboard called Mom "a fine blues ballad". Record World described the song as a "soulful swinger". Paul Sexton of Record Mirror called Mom "one of the (album's) highlights." Robert Christgau of the Village Voice described the song as "their best tune" on the album. Ovid Goode Jr. of the Los Angeles Daily News also noted that "A little sentimentality is expressed on the album with 'Mom', a song expressing the love and dedication that only a mother can give."

== Samples ==
"Mom" was sampled by DJ Quik on "Speed" off his 1998 album Rhythm-al-ism and by Three 6 Mafia on I'm So Hi from the group's 2000 album When the Smoke Clears: Sixty 6, Sixty 1. The single's b-side Power, was sampled by Mac Miller on the track BDE Bonus from his 2011 album Best Day Ever. As well by Pete Rock featuring Freddie Foxxx on the song Mind Frame from Rock's 2011 album PeteStrumentals (2nd Edition).
