= The Ultimate Collection (Earth, Wind & Fire album) =

Compilation album by Earth, Wind & Fire
- Released: July 1999
- Genres: R&B, disco
- Label: Columbia Records
- Producers: Maurice White, Charles Stepney

Earth, Wind & Fire chronology
Greatest Hits (1998)	The Ultimate Collection (1999)	That's the Way of the World: Alive in 75 (2002)

Singles from The Ultimate Collection
- 1. "September 99" Released: 1999

The Ultimate Collection is a compilation album by American band Earth, Wind & Fire released in July 1999 on Columbia Records. The album reached No. 34 upon the UK Albums Chart.

== Singles ==
The album cut "September '99" reached No. 1 on the RPM Canadian Dance Songs chart, No. 4 on the UK Dance Singles chart and No. 25 on the UK Pop Singles chart.

== Critical reception ==
Professional ratings
Review scores
Source	Rating
AllMusic	3.5/5 stars
The Guardian	5/5 stars
Uncut	5/5 stars
Mixmag	4/5 stars

With a 5 out of 5 stars rating Kit Aiken of Uncut called the album "near perfect" and "invaluable". Andy Kellman of AllMusic gave a 3.5 out of 5 stars rating and noted "A truly "ultimate" Earth, Wind & Fire compilation would offer a larger assortment of highlights from the band's catalog, but this is a decent one-disc/20-track overview." With a 4 out of 5 stars rating, Toby Manning of Mixmag wrote "Earthy, Fiery? No just elemental." Caroline Sullivan of The Guardian also gave a 5 out of 5 stars rating and declared "in fact, apart from ballads like 'That's the Way of the World', its hard to find a track on The Ultimate Collection that doesn't sparkle on the dance floor."

== Track listing ==
No.	Title	Length
1.	"Boogie Wonderland"	4:49
2.	"Shining Star"	2:50
3.	"That's the Way of the World"	5:43
4.	"After the Love Has Gone"	4:25
5.	"Can't Hide Love"	4:08
6.	"September"	3:35
7.	"Got to Get You into My Life"	4:10
8.	"Sing a Song"	3:22
9.	"Gratitude"	3:27
10.	"Serpentine Fire"	3:50
11.	"Fantasy"	4:37
12.	"In the Stone"	4:26
13.	"Reasons"	4:59
14.	"Saturday Nite"	4:02
15.	"Let's Groove"	5:36
16.	"Getaway"	3:57
17.	"September '99 (Phats & Small Remix)"	3:43
18.	"Let's Groove (Merchant of Menace remix)"	3:45
19.	"Boogie Wonderland (Stretch/Vern remix)"	3:43

== Charts ==
Chart (1999)	Peak position
UK Pop Albums	34
