= September (song) =

1978 song by Earth, Wind & Fire

Single by Earth, Wind & Fire

from the album The Best of Earth, Wind & Fire, Vol. 1
- B-side: "Love's Holiday"; "Can't Hide Love"
- Released: November 18, 1978
- Recorded: September 1978
- Genre: Disco; funk; R&B
- Length: 3:35
- Label: ARC/Columbia
- Composer: Al McKay
- Lyricists: Allee Willis; Maurice White
- Producer: Maurice White

Earth, Wind & Fire singles chronology
"Got to Get You into My Life" (1978)	"September" (1978)	"Boogie Wonderland" (1979)

Music video
- "September" on YouTube

"September" is a song by the American band Earth, Wind & Fire and released as a single on November 18, 1978, by ARC/Columbia Records. The song was written by Allee Willis and Maurice White, based on a music sequence developed by guitarist Al McKay. The song was included as one of two new tracks on the compilation album The Best of Earth, Wind & Fire, Vol. 1, "September" was very successful commercially and reached No. 1 on the US Billboard Hot R&B Songs chart, No. 8 on the US Billboard Hot 100, and No. 3 on the UK Singles Chart. The song remains a staple of the band's body of work and has been sampled, covered, remixed, and re-recorded numerous times.

It was added to the Library of Congress's National Recording Registry list of sound recordings that "are culturally, historically, or aesthetically important" in 2018.

== Composition ==
"September" has a funk groove based on a four-measure pattern that is consistent between verses and choruses, built on a circle of fifths.

Written in the key of A major, and using a chord progression written by Earth, Wind & Fire guitarist Al McKay, vocalist Maurice White and songwriter Allee Willis wrote the song over one month. Willis was initially bothered by the gibberish "ba-dee-ya" lyric White used through the song, and begged him to rewrite it: "I just said, 'What the fuck does "ba-dee-ya" mean?' And he essentially said, 'Who the fuck cares?' I learned my greatest lesson ever in songwriting from him, which was never let the lyric get in the way of the groove." The song was included on the band's first compilation—The Best of Earth, Wind & Fire, Vol. 1—solely to boost sales with original content.

The lyrics ask, "Do you remember the 21st night of September?". Maurice White claimed he simply chose the 21st due to how it sounded when sung. However, in a 2019 interview with The Wall Street Journal, his wife Marilyn White explains that September 21 was the expected birthdate of their son Kahbran. Recounting hearing the song for the first time, Marilyn said, "My whole body smiled. It was like a secret message between us and our son. I said, 'Oh my God, you remembered.' 'Yeah,' Maurice said, 'Yeah, I did.'"

== Reception ==
"September" has been one of the biggest commercial and critical successes of Earth, Wind & Fire's career, and vocalist Philip Bailey considers it one of the group's best songs. The song was certified silver by the British Phonographic Industry and certified gold in the US (until the RIAA lowered the sales levels for certified singles in 1989, a Gold single equaled 1 million units sold.) "September" was later certified Gold for digital sales by the RIAA, and has sold over 2 million digital copies in the US as of September 2017. Record World called it a "smooth, quick song that captures the mood of autumn nostalgia, and should capture radio audiences too." In 2021, Rolling Stone included "September" at No. 65 on their updated list of the "500 Greatest Songs of All Time".

"September" is one of the group's biggest hits in several decades of performing. A 2005 retrospective on Earth, Wind & Fire by Billboard ranked this song sixth on their top singles. Earth, Wind & Fire recorded a new version of the song, retitled "December", for their 2014 Christmas album Holiday; this version changes the date reference in the lyric to "the 25th night of December" to make the song a Christmas song but is otherwise identical to the original recording.

=== Cultural impact ===
"September" has had renewed interest in the 21st century and has been an Internet meme as well as the source of original content by social media users. Every September 21 for six years, Demi Adejuyigbe released a series of popular video with remixed versions of the song, emphasizing the date. CBS set the date in 2025 to air a Grammy special honoring Earth, Wind, & Fire. VTuber Gigi Murin livestreamed herself singing the song for eight hours straight in September 2024.

The song has been featured in many films: Sisqó and Vitamin C cover the song during the closing credits of the film Get Over It (2001), Night at the Museum (2006) has it in the last scene before the end credits, and a version featuring the band accompanied by Anna Kendrick and Justin Timberlake is featured in the 2016 film Trolls. The 2019 film Polar features the song playing during its opening sequence, with the characters singing along to it together after pulling off a successful hit. The 2023 film Robot Dreams uses the song multiple times, including to accompany the climax.

In the United Kingdom the song has been popular as the basis of football chants at a number of clubs: according to a Guardian article this originated at Newcastle United F.C. where fans started singing a chant about player Chancel Mbemba in the autumn of 2015. It was also adapted by fans of the England national football team at the 2018 FIFA World Cup in Russia: "Woah, England are in Russia / Woah, drinking all the vodka / Woah, England's going all the way".

The "December" version from Holiday appears in a 2022 Christmas TV commercial for Kohl's.

== Personnel ==
Earth, Wind & Fire

- Maurice White – lead and backing vocals, production
- Philip Bailey – lead and backing vocals, congas
- Al McKay – backing vocals, guitar
- Johnny Graham – guitar
- Larry Dunn – Rhodes, piano
- Verdine White – bass
- Fred White – drums
- Ralph Johnson – drums, percussion
- Andrew Woolfolk – soprano saxophone

Additional musicians

- Rahmlee Michael Davis – trumpet
- Michael Harris – trumpet
- Louis Satterfield – trombone
- Paulinho da Costa – percussion

Technical personnel

- Tom "Tom Tom 84" Washington – string, background vocal, and horn arrangements

== Charts ==
=== Weekly charts ===
Weekly chart performance for "September"
Chart (1978–1979)	Peak position
Australia (Kent Music Report)	12
Belgium (Ultratop 50 Flanders)	19
Canada Singles (Canadian Recording Association)	8
Canada Top Singles (RPM)	10
Canada Dance/Urban (RPM)	14
Finland (Suomen virallinen lista)	13
France (IFOP)	6
Ireland (IRMA)	8
Netherlands (Dutch Top 40)	18
Netherlands (Single Top 100)	19
New Zealand (Recorded Music NZ)	12
Norway (VG-lista)	6
South Africa (Springbok Radio)	18
Sweden (Sverigetopplistan)	13
UK Singles (Official Charts)	3
US Adult Contemporary (Billboard)	41
US Billboard Hot 100	8
US Hot Soul Singles (Billboard)	1
US Cash Box Top 100	6
West Germany (GfK)	20

Weekly chart performance for "September"
Chart (2008–2009)	Peak
Japan (Japan Hot 100)	31

Weekly chart performance for "September"
Chart (2020–2024)	Peak
Global 200 (Billboard)	60

Weekly chart performance for "September"
Chart (2026)	Peak position
Canada Hot 100 (Billboard)	49
Israel International Airplay (Media Forest)	17

=== Year-end charts ===
Annual sales chart performance for "September"
Chart (1979)	Position
Australia (Kent Music Report)	80
Canada Top Singles (RPM)	108
UK Singles (OCC)	41
US Billboard Hot 100	78
US Hot R&B/Hip-Hop Songs (Billboard)	33
US Cash Box	54

== Certifications ==
Certifications for "September"
Region	Certification	Certified units/sales
Australia (ARIA)	8× Platinum	560,000^{‡}
Denmark (IFPI Danmark)	2× Platinum	180,000^{‡}
Germany (BVMI)	3× Gold	900,000^{‡}
Italy (FIMI)	2× Platinum	200,000^{‡}
Japan (RIAJ) Full-length ringtone	Gold	100,000^{*}
Mexico (AMPROFON)	3× Platinum+Gold	210,000^{‡}
New Zealand (RMNZ)	8× Platinum	240,000^{‡}
Spain (Promusicae)	2× Platinum	120,000^{‡}
United Kingdom (BPI)	5× Platinum	3,000,000^{‡}
United States (RIAA) Physical release	Gold	1,000,000^{^}
United States (RIAA)	6× Platinum	6,000,000^{‡}
Streaming
Japan (RIAJ)	Gold	50,000,000^{†}
^{*} Sales figures based on certification alone.^{^} Shipments figures based on certification alone.^{‡} Sales+streaming figures based on certification alone.^{†} Streaming-only figures based on certification alone.

== "September '99" ==
"September '99"

Single by Earth, Wind & Fire

from the album The Ultimate Collection
- Released: 1999
- Genre: Dance-pop, house
- Length: 3:43
- Label: Columbia
- Composer: Al McKay
- Lyricists: Allee Willis; Maurice White
- Producer: Maurice White

Earth, Wind & Fire singles chronology
"When Love Goes Wrong" (1997)	"September '99" (1999)	"All in the Way" (2003)

Music video
- "September 99" on YouTube

A remix of the song by English dance music duo Phats & Small called "September '99" was issued in 1999 on the compilation album The Ultimate Collection. The single reached No. 1 on the RPM Canadian Dance Songs chart, No. 4 on the UK Dance Chart and No. 25 on the UK Singles Chart.

=== Track listing ===
The compact disc single from INCredible Records (catalogue code INCR24CD) features:

1. "September '99" (radio edit) – 3:45
2. "September '99" (Mutant disco vocal mix) – 6:44
3. "September '99" (Mutant disco dub) – 6:11

=== Charts ===
==== Weekly charts ====
Weekly sales chart performance for "September '99"
Chart (1999)	Peak
Belgium (Ultratop 50 Flanders)	32
Denmark (IFPI)	20
Europe (Eurochart Hot 100)	65
France (SNEP)	64
Germany (GfK)	40
Iceland (Íslenski Listinn Topp 40)	27
Ireland (IRMA)	28
Netherlands (Dutch Top 40)	12
Netherlands (Single Top 100)	25
Norway (VG-lista)	15
Scottish Singles Sales (Official Charts)	28
Sweden (Sverigetopplistan)	48
Switzerland (Schweizer Hitparade)	33
UK Singles (Official Charts)	25
UK Dance (Official Charts)	4

Weekly sales chart performance for "September '99"
Chart (2011)	Peak
France (SNEP)	29
UK Pop (Music Week)	14

==== Year-end charts ====
Annual sales chart performance for "September '99"
Chart (1999)	Position
Netherlands (Dutch Top 40)	109

== Kirk Franklin version ==
"September"

Single by Kirk Franklin

from the album Interpretations: Celebrating the Music of Earth, Wind & Fire
- Released: 2007
- Genre: R&B, gospel
- Label: Stax
- Composer: Al McKay
- Lyricists: Allee Willis; Maurice White
- Producer: Maurice White

Kirk Franklin singles chronology
"Look at Me Now" (2006)	"September" (2007)	"Declaration (This Is It)" (2007)

Music video
- "September" on YouTube

Kirk Franklin released a cover of "September" in 2007 on Stax Records. The song reached No. 17 on the Billboard Adult R&B Songs chart and No. 26 on the Billboard Hot Gospel Songs chart. Franklin's rendition was produced by Maurice White and appears on the 2007 tribute album Interpretations: Celebrating the Music of Earth, Wind & Fire, and was released as the lead single to promote the album.

=== Critical reception ===
Steve Jones of USA Today wrote: "Franklin turns the energetic 'September' into a gospel-fueled romp." James Christopher Monger of AllMusic found "Kirk Franklin offering up an impeccable, if nearly identical rendition of 'September'." Mike Joseph of PopMatters said "Kirk Franklin takes the band's 'September' (literally, by sampling the original version) and refashions it into an anthem of survival, using 'September' as a metaphor for a time when things aren't going so well, and using his talented choir of singers to give the lyrics a jubilant reading." People exclaimed "Kirk Franklin turns 'September' into a rousing celebration of faith."

== See also ==
- 21 September – Significant events that occurred on 21 September
- List of best-selling singles

== Bibliography ==
- The Best of Earth, Wind & Fire Songbook, published by Hal Leonard LLC (1989) ISBN 9781495083716
