= Last Days and Time =

Studio album by Earth, Wind & Fire
- Released: October 1972
- Recorded: April 1972
- Studios: Sunset Sound Studios, Hollywood, California
- Genres: R&B; funk; jazz fusion
- Length: 39:54
- Label: Columbia
- Producer: Joe Wissert

Earth, Wind & Fire chronology
Sweet Sweetback's Baadasssss Song (1971)	Last Days and Time (1972)	Head to the Sky (1973)

Singles from Last Days and Time
- 1. "Mom" Released: November 1972

Last Days and Time is the third studio album by American band Earth, Wind & Fire, released in October 1972 by Columbia Records. The album reached No. 15 on the US Billboard Top Soul Albums chart and No. 9 on the UK Blues & Soul Top British Soul Albums chart.

== Overview ==
Last Days and Time was produced by Joe Wissert and recorded at Sunset Sound Studios in Hollywood, California.

The album includes covers of Bread's "Make It with You" and Pete Seeger's "Where Have All the Flowers Gone?".

== Singles ==
The song, "Mom", reached No. 39 on the Cashbox Top R&B Singles chart.

== Critical reception ==
Professional ratings
Review scores
Source	Rating
AllMusic	3/5 stars
Billboard	(favourable)
Village Voice	C+
Los Angeles Daily News	(favourable)
Record Mirror	3/5 stars
Variety	(favourable)
The Plain Dealer	(favourable)
Sounds	3/5 stars

Barry Lazell of Sounds gave Last Days and Time, in his words "an early set never before available in the (UK)", a 3 out of 5 stars review." Variety called the album "pulsating". William Ruhlmann of Allmusic in a 3/5 stars review proclaimed, "Earth, Wind & Fire were nothing if not ambitious, and by the time of their third album they had forged an individual sound by absorbing nearly everything that had gone before them in the previous ten years. It was as if they were trying to encapsulate every eclectic foray pursued by Motown, from catchy, rhythmic pop to churning funk, and even from Stevie Wonder singing borrowed folk songs like "Blowin' in the Wind" (here, Philip Bailey did "Where Have All the Flowers Gone?") to the schmaltzy, string-filled pop that spelled legitimacy to Motown. Not only that, they wanted to incorporate Sly & the Family Stone's horn-filled, gutbucket R&B and some of the fusion style of Weather Report. On Last Days and Time, they succeeded in pulling all that into their orbit". Billboard found "Earth, Wind & Fire's dynamic soul rock style is the main ingredients" of the album.

Paul Sexton of Record Mirror in a 1979 3/5 stars review wrote, "Musical historians and EW&F fans alike will welcome the release, for the first time in this country, of EW&F's first CBS album...Maurice White was still the wallah, even in those days, but the band hadn't really established their sound, although the material they used was not enormously different. The lush production, and White's domination of the vocals are not there, and there's greater reliance on other people's material. Such as David Gates "Make It With You" and even more unlikely, Pete Seeger's "Where Have All the Flowers Gone?." Edward Hill of the Plain Dealer said "Released a year after What's Going On, the disc used jazz-like instrumental experimentation expanding on Gaye's vision of the coming desolation." Ovid Goode Jr. of The Los Angeles Daily News declared "There are many groups around today capitalizing on the rock-jazz sound which has become so popular. The only problem is that many of the groups are beginning to sound alike, both in their styles and in their material. However, take the same two ingredients, rock and jazz, add a pound of soul and a whole new sound is born, reflected in the music of Earth, Wind and Fire. The group's first album on Columbia, Last Days and Time, sprouts forth with a fresh sound that sets it apart from many of the ho-hum aggregations around today. The album consists of eight moving tunes".

== Legacy ==
Producer Jimmy Jam became a fan of EWF after listening to Last Days and Time. Hip Hop artist Nas was also inspired by the LP's cover art while British singer Gabrielle named the album as one of her favorites.

== Track listing ==
Side one
No.	Title	Writer(s)	Length
1.	"Time Is on Your Side"	Roland Bautista, Maurice White, Verdine White	3:41
2.	"Interlude"	Maurice White	0:23
3.	"They Don't See"	Mark Davis	3:31
4.	"Interlude"	Maurice White	0:23
5.	"Make It with You"	David Gates	3:26
6.	"Power"	Maurice White	8:14

Side two
No.	Title	Writer(s)	Length
7.	"Remember the Children"	Roland Bautista, Maurice White, Verdine White	4:03
8.	"Interlude"	Maurice White	0:52
9.	"Where Have All the Flowers Gone?"	Pete Seeger	4:52
10.	"I'd Rather Have You"	Skip Scarborough	4:40
11.	"Mom"	Maurice White, Verdine White	5:49

== Personnel ==
- Maurice White – vocals, drums, kalimba
- Verdine White – vocals, bass, percussion
- Philip Bailey – vocals, congas, percussion
- Jessica Cleaves – vocals
- Roland Bautista – acoustic and electric guitars
- Larry Dunn – piano, organ, clavinet
- Ronnie Laws – flute, soprano and tenor saxophones
- Ralph Johnson – drums, percussion

=== Production ===
- Producer – Joe Wissert
- Engineers – Kent Nebergall and Al Schmitt
- Remix – Al Schmitt
- Mastered by Johnny Golden and Bob MacCloud Jr. at Artisan Sound Recorders (Hollywood, California)
- Design – Mati Klarwein
- Photography – Roland Charles

== Charts ==
Album

Year	Chart	Peak Position
1973	US Billboard Top Soul Albums	15
1973	US Billboard Top LPs & Tape	87
1973	US Cashbox Top 100 Albums	33
1979	UK Blues & Soul Top British Soul Albums	9

Singles

Year	Single	Chart	Peak Position
1973	"Mom"	Cashbox R&B Singles	39
