= Kalimba Story =

1974 song by Earth, Wind, & Fire

- Japan release picture sleeve

Single by Earth, Wind & Fire

from the album Open Our Eyes
- B-side: "Tee Nine Chee Bit"
- Released: July 1974
- Recorded: 1973
- Genre: Funk, R&B
- Length: 4:03 (album version); 2:58 (single version)
- Label: Columbia
- Songwriter(s): Maurice White, Verdine White
- Producer(s): Joe Wissert, Maurice White

Earth, Wind & Fire singles chronology
"Mighty Mighty" (1974)	"Kalimba Story" (1974)	"Devotion" (1974)

"Kalimba Story" is a song by R&B band Earth, Wind & Fire released as a single in 1974 on Columbia Records.

== Overview ==
Kalimba Story was produced by Maurice White and Joe Wissert and composed by Maurice and Verdine White. The song also came off EWF's 1974 album Open Our Eyes

== Critical reception ==
Record World said that "What Stevie Wonder has done for the clavinet, this group does for the African thumb piano, the 'kalimba.'"

Alex Henderson of Allmusic called "Kalimba Story" a "treasure".

== Chart performance ==
The single reached number six on the Billboard Hot Soul Singles chart, and number fifty-five on the Hot 100. In Canada the song reached number 63.

== Samples ==
"Kalimba Story" was sampled by hip hop duo Gang Starr on their 1990 track Jazz Thing (Movie Mix).
