= Keep Your Head to the Sky =

Single by Earth, Wind & Fire

from the album Head to the Sky
- B-side: "Build Your Nest"
- Released: October 1973
- Recorded: 1973
- Genre: R&B
- Length: 5:00 (album version); 3:25 (single version)
- Label: Columbia
- Songwriter: Maurice White
- Producer: Joe Wissert

Earth, Wind & Fire singles chronology
"Evil" (1973)	"Keep Your Head to the Sky" (1973)	"Mighty Mighty" (1974)

"Keep Your Head to the Sky" is a song recorded by American R&B band Earth, Wind & Fire for their 1973 album, Head to the Sky. It was released as a single by Columbia Records, peaking at No. 23 on the Billboard Hot Soul Singles chart.

== Overview ==
"Keep Your Head to the Sky" was written by Maurice White and produced by Joe Wissert. The single's b-side was a tune called "Build Your Nest". Both songs came from Earth, Wind & Fire's 1973 studio album Head to the Sky.

== Critical reception ==
Vince Aletti of Rolling Stone proclaimed that "Keep Your Head to the Sky", "with the gentle admonition to keep your head in faith’s atmosphere, has a luscious, luminous quality". Alex Henderson of Allmusic also called the tune "hauntingly pretty".

== Personnel ==
- Producer: Joe Wissert
- Lead Vocal: Philip Bailey
- Composer: Maurice White
- Saxophone: Andrew Woolfolk
- Percussion: Johnny Graham, Verdine White, Ralph Johnson, Philip Bailey & Al McKay
- Guitar: Johnny Graham & Al McKay
- Kalimba: Maurice White
- Organ, Piano: Larry Dunn
- Vocals: Verdine White, Philip Bailey, Maurice White & Jessica Cleaves
- Sitar: Al McKay
- Engineer: Robert Appere
- Drums: Ralph Johnson & Maurice White
- Congas: Philip Bailey
- Clarinet: Larry Dunn
- Bass Guitar: Verdine White

== Samples ==
"Keep Your Head to the Sky" was sampled by Lisa "Left Eye" Lopes on Head to the Sky on her 2001 album Supernova. As well by Jay Z on his 1994 track "Reach the Top". Along with Guru featuring Amel Larrieux on "Guidance" from his 2000 album Guru's Jazzmatazz, Vol. 3: Streetsoul. The song was also sampled by Kirk Franklin on "Keep Your Head" from his 2005 album Hero and by DMX on "Head Up" from his 2012 album Undisputed.

Keep Your Head To The Sky was interpolated by Mary J. Blige on Keep Your Head off her 1998 live album The Tour.

== Chart positions ==
Chart (1973)	Peak position
U.S. Billboard Hot 100	52
U.S. Billboard Hot Soul Singles	23
