= Head to the Sky =

Studio album by Earth, Wind & Fire
- Released: May 1973
- Recorded: 1973
- Studio: Clover Recorders, Hollywood, California
- Genre: Progressive soul; jazz fusion
- Length: 36:51
- Label: Columbia
- Producer: Joseph Wissert

Earth, Wind & Fire chronology
Last Days and Time (1972)	Head to the Sky (1973)	Open Our Eyes (1974)

Singles from Open Your Eyes
- 1. "Evil" Released: June 1973; 2. "Keep Your Head to the Sky" Released: October 1973

Head to the Sky is the fourth studio album by American band Earth, Wind & Fire, released in May 1973 on Columbia Records. The album rose to No. 2 on the Billboard Top Soul Albums chart and No. 27 on the Billboard 200 chart. Head to the Sky has also been certified Platinum in the US by the RIAA.

== Overview ==
Head to the Sky was produced by Joe Wissert with bandleader Maurice White serving as a musical director on the album. The LP was also recorded at Clover Recorders Studios, Hollywood, California.

== Singles ==
"Evil" peaked at No. 19 on the Billboard Adult Contemporary Songs chart and No. 25 on the Billboard Hot Soul Songs chart. "Keep Your Head to the Sky" also reached No. 23 on the Billboard Hot Soul Songs chart.

== Critical reception ==
Professional ratings
Review scores
Source	Rating
Allmusic	3/5 stars
Rolling Stone	(favorable)
Village Voice	(B−)
Billboard	(favourable)
Variety	(favourable)
Pittsburgh Press	(favourable)

Tony Palermo of the Pittsburgh Press noted "Folks like to compare this bunch with War, but the first difference that hits you with E,W&F's brand of jazz-rhythm and blues is the smoothness of Jessica Cleaves' vocal work. Then, the extra slug of R&B in their style". Billboard noted that the band "does everything well" on the LP. Vince Aletti of Rolling Stone declared "Been having a lot of music dreams lately but this one’s not too surprising since I’ve been playing the Earth, Wind & Fire album pretty constantly for the past week, certainly beyond all expectations. With a cover like this one — the eight men in the group shirtless, the one woman all in white, surrounded by a starburst arrangement of cut flowers, repeated with slight variations in the centerfold — I’m surprised I even broke the shrinkwrap. And this group started in Chicago?".

Robert Christgau of the Village Voice in a B− review claimed, "Most of the first side keeps up the good work..But the mood jazz excursion on side two exposes White's essential fatuousness. "Zanzibar," it's called, as befits a travelogue; its saxophone solo (by Ronnie Laws's replacement, Andrew Woolfolk) could make Alice Coltrane blush." Alex Henderson of Allmusic, in a 3/5 stars review wrote "Maurice White's very spiritual and ambitious brand of soul and funk was starting to pay off commercially...EWF still had what was basically a cult following, but that was beginning to change with Head to the Sky. And when EWF took off commercially in 1974 and 1975, many new converts went back and saw for themselves just how excellent an album Head to the Sky was." Variety also described the record as "a movin' new package.

Issac Hayes called Head to the Sky one of Earth, Wind & Fire's five essential recordings. Erykah Badu paid tribute to the album within the music video of her 2008 single "Honey".

== Track listing ==
Side one
No.	Title	Writer(s)	Length
1.	"Evil"	Philip Bailey, Maurice White	5:00
2.	"Keep Your Head to the Sky"	Maurice White	5:10
3.	"Build Your Nest"	Maurice White, Verdine White	3:17
4.	"The World's a Masquerade"	Skip Scarborough	4:48

Side two
No.	Title	Writer(s)	Length
5.	"Clover"	Larry Dunn, Maurice White	5:27
6.	"Zanzibar"	Edu Lobo	13:09

== Personnel ==
- Verdine White – vocals, bass, percussion
- Philip Bailey – vocals, congas, percussion
- Maurice White – vocals, drums, kalimba, leader
- Jessica Cleaves – vocals
- Johnny Graham – guitar, percussion
- Al McKay – guitar, sitar, percussion
- Larry Dunn – clarinet, piano, organ
- Ralph Johnson – drums, percussion
- Andrew Woolfolk – soprano saxophone, flute
- Oscar Brashear – guest trumpet on "Zanzibar"

== Charts and Certifications ==
=== Weekly charts ===
Chart (1973)	Peak position
US Cashbox Top 100 Albums	29
US Billboard 200	27
US Top R&B/Hip-Hop Albums (Billboard)	2

=== Year-end charts ===
Chart (1973)	Rank
US Billboard 200	71
US Top R&B/Hip-Hop Albums (Billboard)	24

Singles – Billboard
Year	Single	Chart	Position
1973	"Evil"	Billboard Adult Contemporary Songs	19
1973	"Evil"	Billboard Black Singles	25
1973	"Evil"	Billboard Hot 100	50
1973	"Keep Your Head To The Sky"	Billboard Black Singles	23
1973	"Keep Your Head To The Sky"	Billboard Hot 100	52

=== Certifications ===
Country	Award
US (RIAA)	Platinum
