= Earth, Wind & Fire (album) =

Studio album by Earth, Wind & Fire
- Released: March 1971
- Recorded: 1970
- Studio: Sunset Sound Studios, Hollywood
- Genre: Funk; soul; jazz fusion
- Length: 28:08
- Label: Warner Bros.
- Producer: Joe Wissert

Earth, Wind & Fire chronology
Earth, Wind & Fire (1971)	The Need of Love (1971)

Singles from Earth, Wind & Fire
- 1. "Fan the Fire" Released: January 1971; 2. "Love Is Life" Released: March 1971; 3. "Help Somebody" Released: May 1971 (UK)

Earth, Wind & Fire is the debut studio album by American band Earth, Wind & Fire, released in March 1971 by Warner Bros. Records. The album peaked at No. 24 on the Billboard Top Soul Albums chart.

== Overview ==
The album was produced by Joe Wissert. Hip hop artist Ludacris has also named this LP as one of his five favorite records which he considers forerunners of hip-hop.

== Singles ==
The track "Love Is Life" reached No. 43 on the Billboard Hot Soul Songs chart.

== Critical reception ==
Professional ratings
Review scores
Source	Rating
Allmusic	4.5/5 stars
Village Voice	(C+)
Rolling Stone	(favourable)
Chicago Sun Times	(favourable)
Detroit Free Press	(favourable)
Jazz Journal	3.5/5 stars
DownBeat	5/5 stars

Lester Bangs of Rolling Stone found a "heavy Sly influence" and the "smooth harmonies" of The Fifth Dimension on the album. Robert Christgau of The Village Voice in a C+ review declared, "This postsoul big band isn't as messy as the sum of its cross-references...(sometimes) the expert vocal harmonies neither fit the concept nor assert any personality of their own." Larry Ridley of DownBeat, in a 5/5 stars review declared, "(Maurice White) has assembled here a strong musical organization. They are a tight, well- knit instrumental and vocal group...The vocal voicings are somewhat reminiscent of the Fifth Dimension, but this is not to imply imitation, for Earth, Wind and Fire are just that...Any further critical analysis is unwarranted and my only other comment at this point is go out and buy this record and keep your eyes and ears open to Earth, Wind and Fire."

Al Rudis of the Chicago Sun Times found "Earth, Wind and Fire brings to mind Bossa nova, Sly and the Family Stone, Ray Conniff, Afro-Cuban music and The 5th Dimension". John Bush of AllMusic in a 4.5/5 stars review exclaimed, "The debut for the nine-member Earth, Wind & Fire was as assured as that of any rock band from the '60s and early '70s. Already fluent with the close harmonies of the classiest soul groups, the deep funk of James Brown, and the progressive social concerns and multiple vocal features of Sly & the Family Stone, the group added (courtesy of auteur Maurice White) a set of freewheeling arrangements, heavy on the horns, that made Earth Wind and Fire one of their finest albums". Bob Talbert of the Detroit Free Press also wrote "I'm not sure what to call this group. Afro-gospel-jazz-blues-rock? Must there be a label?...could be a forerunner of musical styles-sort of a Black Blood, Sweat and Tears or Chicago. BS&T with soul maybe".

Isaac Hayes called Earth, Wind & Fire one of the band's five essential recordings.

== Track listing ==
All songs written by Wade Flemons, Maurice White, and Don Whitehead, unless otherwise noted.

Side one
No.	Title	Length
1.	"Help Somebody"	3:34
2.	"Moment of Truth"	3:05
3.	"Love Is Life"	5:04
4.	"Fan the Fire"	5:11

Side two
No.	Title	Writer(s)	Length
5.	"C'mon Children"	Michael Beal, Wade Flemons, Maurice White, Verdine White, Don Whitehead	3:08
6.	"This World Today"		3:28
7.	"Bad Tune"	Beal, Flemons, M. White, V. White, Whitehead	4:38

== Personnel ==
=== Musicians ===
- Michael Beal – guitars
- Leslie Drayton – trumpet
- Wade Flemons – electric piano, vocals
- Sherry Scott – vocals
- Alexander Thomas – trombone
- Chet Washington – reeds
- Maurice White – percussion, drums, vocals, electric kalimba
- Verdine White – bass
- Don Whitehead – acoustic piano, electric piano, vocals
- Doug Carn – Hammond organ
- Phillard Williams – percussion, conga

=== Production ===
- Producer: Joe Wissert
- Recording engineer: Bruce Botnick
- Arranger: Earth, Wind & Fire
- Horn arrangements: Leslie Drayton
- Art direction: Ed Thrasher
- Design: Mary Ann Dibs
- Artwork: Russ Smith

== Charts ==
Album

Year	Chart	Peak Position
1971	Billboard Best Selling Soul LP's	24
1971	Billboard Top LPs	172
