= Evil (Earth, Wind & Fire song) =

Single by Earth, Wind & Fire

from the album Head to the Sky
- B-side: "Clover"
- Released: June 1973
- Recorded: 1973
- Genre: R&B
- Length: 3:09 (single version) 5:00 (album version)
- Label: Columbia
- Songwriters: Maurice White, Philip Bailey
- Producer: Joe Wissert

Earth, Wind & Fire singles chronology
| "Mom" (1972) | "Evil" (1973) | "Keep Your Head to the Sky" (1973) |

"Evil" is a single by the band Earth, Wind & Fire which was issued in June 1973 by Columbia Records. The song peaked at No. 19 on the Billboard Easy Listening chart and No. 25 on the Hot Soul Singles chart.

== Overview ==
Evil was produced by Joe Wissert and written by EWF bandleader Maurice White with Philip Bailey. The b-side of this single was a song called Clover. Both Evil and Clover came off the band's 1973 studio album, Head to the Sky.

== Critical reception ==
Robert Christgau of the Village Voice described Evil as having a "catchy title" with "sweet clear harmonies and sinuous beat". Alex Henderson of Allmusic also called the tune "latin influenced".

== Chart positions ==
| Chart (1973) | Peak position |
|---|---|
| U.S. Billboard Hot 100 | 50 |
| U.S. Billboard Hot Soul Singles | 25 |
| U.S. Billboard Easy Listening | 19 |

== Samples ==
"Evil" was sampled by Deee-Lite on Say Ahhh... from the group's 1994 album Dewdrops in the Garden. David Byrne. Fatboy Slim sampled the song on How are You? from the duo's 2010 soundtrack album Here Lies Love. As well Evil was sampled by Amerie feat. Carl Thomas on a tune called Can We Go from her 2005 album Touch.
