= Mighty Mighty (song) =

Single by Earth, Wind & Fire

from the album Open Our Eyes
- B-side: "Drum Song"
- Released: February 1974
- Recorded: 1973
- Genre: Funk, R&B
- Length: 3:01
- Label: Columbia
- Songwriters: Maurice White, Verdine White
- Producers: Joe Wissert, Maurice White

Earth, Wind & Fire singles chronology
"Keep Your Head to the Sky" (1973)	"Mighty Mighty" (1974)	"Kalimba Story" (1974)

"Mighty Mighty" is a song by R&B band Earth, Wind & Fire, released as a single in 1974 on Columbia Records. The single reached No. 4 on the Billboard Hot Soul Singles chart and No. 29 on the Billboard Hot 100.

== Overview ==
Mighty Mighty was produced by Maurice White and Joe Wissert and composed by Maurice and Verdine White. Mighty Mighty came off EWF's 1974 album Open Our Eyes.

== Critical reception ==
Simon Warner of Popmatters described the song as "an infectious rhythm track built on a chunky guitar line, riddled with snaking, Sly-like horn refrains, and edged with the multiple vocal harmonies." Alex Henderson of Allmusic called Mighty Mighty "a gritty funk smoker". The San Antonio Express also praised the song saying "A mighty soulful hit for this talented group. They've certainly got the right elements."

== Chart positions ==
Chart (1974)	Peak position
U.S. Billboard Hot 100	29
U.S. Billboard Hot Soul Singles	4
