= The Need of Love =

Studio album by Earth, Wind & Fire
- Released: November 1971
- Recorded: 1971
- Studio: Sunset Sound Studios, Hollywood
- Genre: Funk; soul; jazz fusion
- Length: 31:41
- Label: Warner Bros.
- Producer: Joe Wissert

Earth, Wind & Fire chronology
Earth, Wind & Fire (1971)	The Need of Love (1971)	Sweet Sweetback's Baadasssss Song (1971)

Singles from The Need of Love
- 1. "I Think About Lovin' You" Released: January 1972

The Need of Love is the second studio album by American band Earth, Wind & Fire, released in November 1971 by Warner Bros. Records. The album reached No. 35 on the Billboard Top Soul Albums chart. The Need of Love would be the band's final album for Warner Bros. until 1993's Millennium on Reprise Records.

== Overview ==
The Need of Love was produced by Joe Wissert and recorded at Sunset Sound Studios, Hollywood.

Artists such as Jean Carne sang on the album.

The track, "Everything Is Everything", is a cover of the Donny Hathaway song.

== Singles ==
"I Think About Lovin' You" reached No. 44 on the Billboard Hot Soul Singles chart.

== Critical reception ==
Professional ratings
Review scores
Source	Rating
AllMusic	3/5 stars
Village Voice	(C+)
Billboard	(favourable)
Chicago Sun-Times	(favourable)
Jazz Journal	3.5/5 stars

Al Rudis of the Chicago Sun-Times wrote "Their second album, The Need of Love again displays some unusual music that might be called avant garde were it not so melodic and entrancing. The nine-member group mixes excellent jazzy instrumentals with harmony singing and chanting, some big band sounds and some free-form parts as well as solid soul beats. It all works beautifully, and while the elements of Earth, Wind and Fire aren't new, this mixture of them is a unique sound." Within a 3/5 stars review, John Bush of AllMusic found "The ambitions of Earth, Wind & Fire only increased after their stellar debut, and the group brought an abstract sense of composition to their sophomore record, The Need of Love...Compared to the debut, The Need of Love lacks a sense of exuberance as well as a passel of solid songs and performances.".

Billboard found "Behind the lead voice of Sherry Scott the group display good potential, soul and pop". Bruce Lindsay of Jazz Journal, in a 3.5/5 stars review, noted "as evidence of a tight, stylish, band in the early stages of its career this is a worthwhile album".

== Track listing ==
Side one
No.	Title	Writer(s)	Length
1.	"Energy"	Wade Flemons, Sherry Scott, Maurice White, Don Whitehead	9:39
2.	"Beauty"	Wade Flemons, Maurice White, Don Whitehead	4:14

Side two
No.	Title	Writer(s)	Length
3.	"I Can Feel It In My Bones"	Wade Flemons, Maurice White, Don Whitehead	5:04
4.	"I Think About Lovin' You"	Sherry Scott	6:02
5.	"Everything Is Everything"	Richard Evans, Phil Upchurch	6:46

== Personnel ==
- Sherry Scott – vocals
- Wade Flemons – vocals
- Jean Carne – vocals, backing vocals
- Chet Washington – tenor saxophone
- Alex Thomas – trombone
- Michael Beal – guitar, harmonica
- Don Whitehead – acoustic and electric pianos, vocals
- Doug Carn – Hammond B3 organ
- Verdine White – bass
- Maurice White – drums, vocals, percussion, kalimba
- Yackov Ben Israel – percussion, congas
- Oscar Brashear – trumpet solo

== Charts ==
Chart (1972)	Peak position
US Billboard Top LPs & Tape	89
US Billboard Top Soul LPs	35
US Cashbox Top 100 Albums	141
