= Open Our Eyes =

Studio album by Earth, Wind & Fire
- Released: March 25th, 1974
- Recorded: August 1973, Caribou Ranch, Nederland, Colorado, U.S.
- Genre: Progressive soul; funk; jazz
- Length: 39:52
- Label: Columbia/Legacy
- Producer: Maurice White, Joe Wissert

Earth, Wind & Fire chronology
| Head to the Sky (1973) | Open Our Eyes (1974) | Another Time (1974) |

Singles from Open Your Eyes
- 1. "Mighty Mighty" Released: February 1974; 2. "Kalimba Story" Released: July 1974; 3. "Devotion" Released: September 1974

Open Our Eyes is the fifth studio album by American band Earth, Wind & Fire, released March 25th, 1974 on Columbia Records. The album rose to No. 1 on the Billboard Top Soul Albums chart and No. 15 on the Top Pop Albums chart. Open Our Eyes has been certified Platinum in the US by the RIAA.

== Overview ==
Open Our Eyes was produced by Maurice White and Joe Wissert and recorded at Caribou Ranch in Nederland, Colorado, US. During 2001, Open Our Eyes was reissued with four bonus tracks.

== Singles ==
The track, "Mighty Mighty", peaked at No. 4 on the Billboard Hot Soul Songs chart and No. 29 on the Billboard Hot 100 chart. "Kalimba Story" reached No. 6 on the Billboard Hot Soul Songs chart. Another single, "Devotion", peaked at No. 23 on the Billboard Hot Soul Songs chart and No. 33 on the Billboard Hot 100 chart.

== Critical reception ==
Professional ratings
Review scores
| Source | Rating |
|---|---|
| AllMusic | 3/5 stars |
| Billboard | (favourable) |
| Buffalo News | (favourable) |
| PopMatters | (favourable) |
| Rolling Stone | (favorable) |
| Village Voice | (A−) |
| Vibe | 4.5/5 stars |
| The Times | (favourable) |
| Tom Hull – on the Web | B+ |

Rolling Stone called Open Our Eyes "a pleasant miscellany of Africana, Latin rhythms, well-mannered funk, smooth jazz, Sly Stone, Stevie Wonder and the Fifth Dimension". Dale Anderson of the Buffalo News declared "Open Our Eyes is worthy of the attention of progressive music fans everywhere". The Village Voice's Robert Christgau also described Side 1 as "A very pleasant surprise" and Side 2 as a complete "tour de force".

Music journalist Vince Aletti named Open Our Eyes in his ballot for The Village Voice's 1974 Pazz & Jop critics poll.

== Track listing ==
=== Original release ===
Side one
| No. | Title | Writer(s) | Length |
|---|---|---|---|
| 1. | "Mighty Mighty" | Maurice White, Verdine White | 3:01 |
| 2. | "Devotion" | M. White, Philip Bailey | 4:50 |
| 3. | "Fair But So Uncool" | Rick Giles, Charles Stepney | 3:39 |
| 4. | "Feelin' Blue" | Kenny Altman | 4:28 |
| 5. | "Kalimba Story" | M. White, V. White | 4:03 |

Side two
| No. | Title | Writer(s) | Length |
|---|---|---|---|
| 6. | "Drum Song" | M. White | 5:10 |
| 7. | "Tee Nine Chee Bit" | M. White, C. Stepney, P. Bailey | 3:45 |
| 8. | "Spasmodic Movements" | Eddie Harris | 1:50 |
| 9. | "Rabbit Seed" | M. White | 0:31 |
| 10. | "Caribou" | C. Stepney, R. Giles | 3:25 |
| 11. | "Open Our Eyes" | Leon Lumpkins | 5:06 |

=== 2001 Reissue ===
| No. | Title | Writer(s) | Length |
|---|---|---|---|
| 1. | "Mighty Mighty" | Maurice White, Verdine White | 3:03 |
| 2. | "Devotion" | M. White, Philip Bailey | 4:50 |
| 3. | "Fair But So Uncool" | M. White, Rick Giles, Charles Stepney | 3:39 |
| 4. | "Feelin' Blue" | Kenny Altman | 4:28 |
| 5. | "Kalimba Story" | M. White, V. White | 4:03 |
| 6. | "Drum Song" | M. White | 5:10 |
| 7. | "Tee Nine Chee Bit" | M. White, C. Stepney, P. Bailey | 3:45 |
| 8. | "Spasmodic Movements" | Eddie Harris | 1:50 |
| 9. | "Rabbit Seed" | M. White | 0:31 |
| 10. | "Caribou" | C. Stepney, R. Giles | 3:25 |
| 11. | "Open Our Eyes" | Leon Lumpkins | 5:06 |
| 12. | "Ain't No Harm To Moan (Slave Song)" | M. White, Larry Dunn | 5:21 |
| 13. | "Fair But So Uncool (Walkin' In N'Awlins Mix)" | C. Stepney, R. Giles, M. White | 3:37 |
| 14. | "Step's Tune" | M. White, C. Stepney | 2:33 |
| 15. | "Dreams" | M. White, C. Stepney, L. Dunn | 3:23 |

== Personnel ==
- Philip Bailey - vocals, congas, percussion
- Larry Dunn - Moog synthesizer, piano, organ
- Johnny Graham - guitar, percussion
- Ralph Johnson - drums, percussion
- Al McKay - vocals, guitar, percussion
- Maurice White - vocals, drums, kalimba
- Verdine White - vocals, bass, percussion
- Andrew Woolfolk - soprano saxophone, flute

=== Production ===
- Earth, Wind & Fire - Musical arrangements
- Maurice White - Producer (Original recording), Audio Mixing (12–15)
- Bruce Botnick - Recording Engineer, Remix
- Paul Klingberg - Audio Mixing (12–15)
- Leo Sacks - Producer (Reissue), Audio Mixing (12–15)
- Charles Stepney - Associate Producer (Original recording), Musical arrangements
- Joe Wissert - Producer (Original recording)

== Charts and Certifications ==
=== Weekly charts ===
| Chart (1974) | Peak position |
|---|---|
| US Cashbox Top 100 Albums | 10 |
| US Billboard 200 | 15 |
| US Top R&B/Hip-Hop Albums (Billboard) | 1 |

=== Year-end charts ===
| Chart (1974) | Rank |
|---|---|
| US Billboard 200 | 38 |
| US Top R&B/Hip-Hop Albums (Billboard) | 10 |

Singles
| Year | Single | Chart | Position |
|---|---|---|---|
| 1974 | "Devotion" | Billboard Hot Soul Songs | 23 |
| 1974 | "Devotion" | Billboard Hot 100 | 33 |
| 1974 | "Kalimba Story" | Billboard Hot Soul Songs | 6 |
| 1974 | "Kalimba Story" | Billboard Hot 100 | 55 |
| 1974 | "Mighty Mighty" | Billboard Hot Soul Songs | 4 |
| 1974 | "Mighty Mighty" | Billboard Hot 100 | 29 |

=== Certifications ===
| Country | Award |
|---|---|
| US (RIAA) | Platinum |

== See also ==
- List of number-one R&B albums of 1974 (U.S.)
