= I Think About Lovin' You =

Single by Earth, Wind & Fire

from the album The Need of Love
- B-side: "Cmon' Children"
- Released: January 1972
- Recorded: 1971
- Genre: R&B, soul
- Length: 6:02
- Label: Warner Bros.
- Songwriter: Sherry Scott
- Producer: Joe Wissert

Earth, Wind & Fire singles chronology
"Love Is Life" (1971)	"I Think About Lovin' You" (1972)	"Mom" (1972)

"I Think About Lovin' You" is a song by the band Earth, Wind & Fire released as a single in January 1972 by Warner Bros. Records. The song peaked at No. 44 on the Billboard Hot Soul Singles chart.

== Overview ==
"I Think About Lovin' You" was produced by Joe Wissert and composed by Sherry Scott. The song came off EWF's 1971 studio album The Need of Love.

== Critical reception ==
Billboard described I Think About Lovin' You as "a soulful blues ballad".

== Samples ==
The song was sampled by the Fugees on the track "Nappy Heads", which was featured on their 1994 album Blunted on Reality.
