= Wade Flemons =

American soul singer (1940–1993)

- Born: Wade Herbert Flemons; September 25, 1940; Coffeyville, Kansas, Kansas, U.S.
- Died: October 13, 1993 (aged 53) Battle Creek, Michigan, U.S.
- Genres: Soul
- Occupations: Soul singer, songwriter and musician
- Formerly of: Earth, Wind & Fire

Wade Herbert Flemons (September 25, 1940 – October 13, 1993) was an American soul singer, songwriter, and musician. He was a founding member of the band Earth, Wind & Fire.

== Early life ==
He was born in Coffeyville, Kansas, to Samuel and Kathyrine Flemons. His father was a minister, who introduced him to gospel music. After his parents' marriage ended in divorce, Wade moved to Battle Creek, Michigan, where his mother was living, in 1955.

== Career ==
While attending Battle Creek Central High School, Flemons came up with his first hit tune entitled "Here I Stand", a song which he wrote and recorded with his band, the New Comers. Released in 1958 by Chicago-based Vee-Jay Records under his own name, the tune peaked at No. 19 on the Billboard Hot Soul Songs chart and No. 80 on the Billboard Hot 100. "Here I Stand"'s success soon earned him appearances upon both American Bandstand and the Alan Freed Show. A follow-up single from his self-titled debut solo album, "Easy Lovin'" cracked the top ten hit on the Hot Soul Songs chart, while peaking at No. 70 on the Billboard Hot 100, becoming his most commercially successful solo single. His later rendition of Percy Mayfield's "Please Send Me Someone to Love," also reached No. 20 on the Billboard Hot Soul Songs chart.

Flemons eventually started working as a musician and vocalist at Chicago recording studios, gaining a reputation as a prolific songwriter. During his career, he wrote as many as 200 songs for both himself and other musicians. An early songwriting partner of his was Maurice White, later the founder of Earth, Wind & Fire. Having a good rapport with White, in 1969 he became part of his band called the Salty Peppers. Flemons subsequently went on to join White in his next musical venture, becoming one of the lead vocalists – and part-time keyboardist – in Earth, Wind, & Fire. He performed and composed upon the band's 1971 debut LP and 1972 sophomore album. Following disagreements with White, Flemons left the group soon after their second LP was released and was soon followed by most of his original EWF bandmates.

Some of Flemons' solo songs are still revered, upon the UK's Northern soul scene.

== Personal life ==
Flemons married in 1980; he and his wife Brenda had a daughter and three sons. He died from cancer in Battle Creek, Michigan, at the age of 53. A United States Army veteran who served in the Vietnam War, he was buried at the Fort Custer National Cemetery in Augusta, Michigan.

One of his sons, Brian Wade Flemons, followed in his father's footsteps and also became a musician.

== Discography ==
=== Studio albums ===
- Wade Flemons (1959), VeeJay LP 1011

=== Singles ===
| Year | Title | Peak chart positions | | B-side | Album |
| Year | Title | US | US R&B | B-side | Album |
|---|---|---|---|---|---|
| 1958 | "Here I Stand" (2:22) | 80 | 19 | "My Baby Likes to Rock" (2:21) | Wade Flemons (1959) |
| 1959 | "Slow Motion" (2:07) | — (Note: "Slow Motion" never charted on the Hot 100, but peaked at number 1 on the Bubbling Under Hot 100) | — | "Walking by the River" (Note: This B-side does not appear on the album.) (2:40) | Wade Flemons (1959) |
| 1959 | "What's Happening" (2:21) | 94 | — | "Goodnite It's Time to Go" (2:14) | Wade Flemons (1959) |
| 1960 | "Easy Lovin'" (2:16) | 70 | 10 | "Woops Now" (2:21) | Wade Flemons (1959) |
| 1961 | "Please Send Me Someone to Love" (2:10) | — | 20 | "Keep On Loving Me" (2:16) | —N/a |

=== Other releases ===
1960

- "Little John Green" (with Bobby Hendricks)
- "Ain't That Lovin' You Baby" / "I'll Come Runnin"

1961

- "At the Party" / "Devil in Your Soul"

1962

- "I Hope, I Think, I Wish" / "Ain't These Tears?"
- "Half a Love" / "Welcome Stranger"

1963

- "I Came Running (Back From the Party)" / "That Time of Year"

1964

- "I Knew You When" / "That Other Place"
- "Watch Over Her" / "When It Rains It Pours"

1965

- "Empty Balcony" / "Where Did You Go Last Night"

1968

- "Jeanette" / "What A Price to Pay"
- "Two of a Kind" / "I Knew You'd Be Mine"
