= Devotion (song) =

- Spain single cover sleeve

Single by Earth, Wind & Fire

from the album Open Our Eyes
- B-side: "Fair But So Uncool"
- Released: September 1974
- Recorded: 1973
- Genre: R&B
- Length: 4:50 (album version); 3:30 (single version)
- Label: Columbia
- Songwriters: Maurice White, Philip Bailey
- Producers: Joe Wissert, Maurice White

Earth, Wind & Fire singles chronology
"Kalimba Story" (1974)	"Devotion" (1974)	"Hot Dawgit" (1974)

"Devotion" is a single by R&B band Earth, Wind & Fire released in 1974 on Columbia Records. "Devotion" peaked at No. 23 on the Billboard Hot Soul Songs chart and No. 33 on the Billboard Hot 100 chart.

== Overview ==
Devotion was produced by Joe Wissert and Maurice White and composed by White and Philip Bailey, who handled lead vocals. The single's b-side was a song called "Fair But So Uncool". Both songs appeared on the band's 1974 studio album Open Our Eyes.

== Critical reception ==
Alex Henderson of Allmusic called "Devotion" "unforgettable". Simon Werner of Popmatters wrote "the softer, reflective shades of "Devotion", represents a line of spiritual evangelism that would also prosper, and draw on a rich range of influences such as Christian and African mysticism and particularly the symbolism of Egyptology." Craig Werner of Vibe stated "Devotion" is "inspired by Afrocentric consciousness".

Record World said that "speaking of the metaphysical in soft funky terms, the visual act delivers a substantial soul ballad."

== Credits ==
- Johnny Graham - guitar
- Al McKay - guitar, vocals
- Verdine White - bass, vocals
- Larry Dunn - piano
- Fred White - drums
- Ralph Johnson - drums
- Maurice White - drums, vocals
- Philip Bailey - lead vocals

== Chart positions ==
Chart (1974)	Peak position
U.S. Billboard Hot 100	33
U.S. Billboard Hot Soul Singles	23

== Covers and samples ==
Jazz fusion/contemporary jazz group Pieces of a Dream featuring Tracy Hamlin covered the song on their 2004 release No Assembly Required. R&B artist Ledisi covered Devotion on the 2007 tribute album Interpretations: Celebrating the Music of Earth, Wind & Fire.

"Devotion" was sampled by Yo-Yo featuring Ice Cube on the track "You Can't Play with My Yo-Yo" from her 1991 album Make Way for the Motherlode. In 1996, rap group Mo Thugs sampled the song in their single “Thug Devotion” from the album “Family Scriptures”. CeeLo Green featuring Jazze Pha and T.I. sampled "Devotion" on a tune called The One from Green's 2004 album Cee-Lo Green... Is the Soul Machine. Mack 10 sampled Devotion on the song Mozi Wozi from his 1995 self titled album. Drake featuring Kanye West also sampled "Devotion" on the track "Glow" from Drake's 2017 mixtape More Life.

The single's b-side, Fair But So Uncool, was later covered by D'Angelo.
