= Earth, Wind & Fire =

American musical group

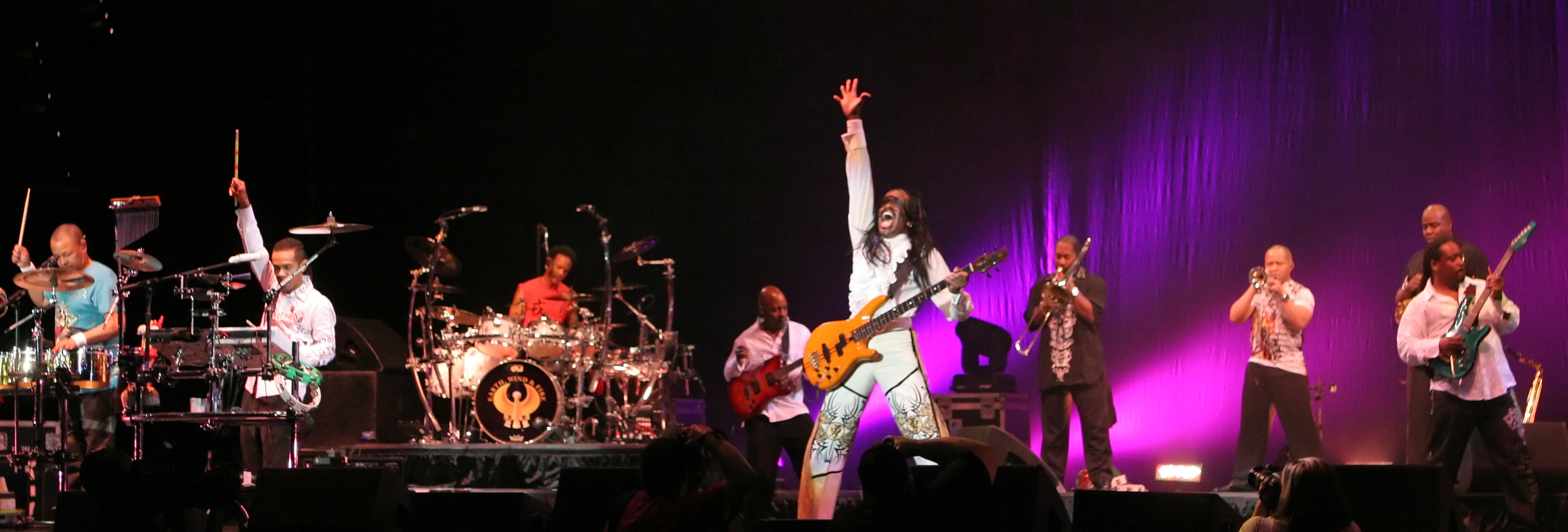
- Earth, Wind & Fire performing in 2009

Background information
- Also known as: EW&F; EWF
- Origin: Chicago, Illinois, U.S.
- Genres: R&B; soul; funk; pop; disco; progressive soul
- Years active: 1969–1984; 1987–present
- Labels: Warner Bros.; ARC; Columbia; Kalimba; Sanctuary
- Spinoff of: The Ramsey Lewis Trio
- Members: Philip Bailey; Verdine White; Ralph Johnson; B. David Whitworth; Oshun Shango Oshunde (born Philip Doron Bailey Jr.); Myron McKinley; John Paris; Morris O'Connor; Serg Dimitrijevic; Earth, Wind & Fire Horns
- Past members: Maurice White; Fred White; Wade Flemons; Don Whitehead; Sherry Scott; Yackov Ben Israel (a.k.a. Phillard Williams); Jessica Cleaves; Ronnie Laws; Roland Bautista; Larry Dunn; Andrew Woolfolk; Al McKay; Sheldon Reynolds; The Phenix Horns; Doug Carn; Sonny Emory; Dick Smith; Vance Taylor; David Lautrec; Greg Moore; Morris Pleasure; Robert Brookins; Freddie Ravel; Daniel de los Reyes; Kimberly Brewer; Kim Johnson; Krystal Bailey; Johnny Graham
- Website: earthwindandfire.com

Earth, Wind & Fire (abbreviated as EW&F or EWF) is an American band formed in Chicago, Illinois, in 1969. Their music spans multiple genres, including jazz, R&B, soul, funk, disco, pop, Latin and Afro-pop. They are among the best-selling bands ever, with sales of over 90 million records worldwide.

The band was formed by Maurice White, originating out of the Salty Peppers; its history includes a hiatus from mid-1984 to mid-1987. Prominent members have included Philip Bailey, Verdine White, Ralph Johnson, Larry Dunn, Al McKay, Roland Bautista, Robert Brookins, Sonny Emory, Ronnie Laws, Sheldon Reynolds and Andrew Woolfolk. The band is known for its kalimba sound, dynamic horn section, energetic and elaborate stage shows, and the contrast between Bailey's falsetto and Maurice's tenor vocals.

The band has won six Grammy Awards out of 17 nominations and four American Music Awards out of 12 nominations. They have been inducted into the Rock and Roll Hall of Fame, the Vocal Group Hall of Fame, the NAACP Image Award Hall of Fame, and Hollywood's Rockwalk, and earned a star on the Hollywood Walk of Fame. The band has also received an ASCAP Rhythm & Soul Heritage Award, a BET Lifetime Achievement Award, a Soul Train Legend Award, a NARAS Signature Governor's Award, a Grammy Lifetime Achievement Award, the 2012 Congressional Horizon Award, and the Kennedy Center Honors in 2019. Rolling Stone has called them "innovative, precise yet sensual, calculated yet galvanizing" and declared that the band "changed the sound of black pop". VH1 has described EWF as "one of the greatest bands".

== History ==
=== 1969–1970: Beginnings ===
In 1969, Maurice White, a former session drummer for Chess Records and former member of the Ramsey Lewis Trio, joined two friends in Chicago, Wade Flemons and Don Whitehead, as a songwriting team. They wrote songs and commercials in the Chicago area. The three friends got a recording contract with Capitol Records. Calling themselves The Salty Peppers, they had a marginal hit single in the Midwest titled "La La Time".

The Salty Peppers' second single, "Uh Huh Yeah", did not fare as well. Maurice moved from Chicago to Los Angeles. He added singer Sherry Scott and percussionist Yackov Ben Israel, both from Chicago, to the band. He asked his younger brother Verdine to join and on June 6, 1970, Verdine moved from Chicago to LA to become the band's bassist. Maurice began shopping demo tapes featuring Donny Hathaway to various record labels and the band eventually signed to Warner Bros. Records.

=== 1970–1974: Formation and early years ===
Maurice White's astrological sign, Sagittarius, has a primary elemental quality of fire and seasonal qualities of earth and air, according to classical triplicities. Sagittarius in the northern hemisphere occurs in the autumn, whose element is earth, and in the southern hemisphere, it is spring, whose element is air. Hence the omission of water, the fourth classical element. Based on this, he changed the band's name, to Earth, Wind & Fire. White held further auditions in L.A, adding Michael Beal on guitar, Chester Washington on reeds, and Leslie Drayton on trumpet. White was a percussionist and lead vocalist. Drayton served as the group's arranger. Trombonist Alex Thomas completed the then ten-man lineup. Warner Bros. designated Joe Wissert to be the band's producer.

==== Earth, Wind & Fire ====
The band's self-titled debut album was released in March 1971 on Warner Bros. The album got to No. 24 on the Billboard Top Soul Albums chart and was certified Gold in France by the SNEP.

Larry Ridley of DownBeat, in a 5/5 stars review declared, "(Maurice White) has assembled here a strong musical organization. They are a tight, well- knit instrumental and vocal group...The vocal voicings are somewhat reminiscent of the Fifth Dimension, but this is not to imply imitation, for Earth, Wind and Fire are just that...Any further critical analysis is unwarranted and my only other comment at this point is go out and buy this record and keep your eyes and ears open to Earth, Wind and Fire." Bob Talbert of the Detroit Free Press, with praise wrote, "I'm not sure what to call this group. Afro-gospel-jazz-blues-rock? Must there be a label?...could be a forerunner of musical styles-sort of a black Blood, Sweat and Tears or Chicago. BS&T with soul maybe".

==== Sweet Sweetback's Baadassss Song ====
EWF then performed on the soundtrack of Melvin Van Peebles 1971 feature film Sweet Sweetback's Baadasssss Song. The soundtrack, entirely composed by Van Peebles, was released in June 1971 on Stax Records. Ian McCann of udiscovermusic.com found "Today, though, you couldn't find a record, soundtrack, or otherwise, as freewheelin' and funky as this." Jamie Atkins of Record Collector also proclaimed the soundtrack is "Well worth checking out...(where their) hippified psych soul...crossed over into relentless, harder-edged funk." The album reached No. 13 on the Billboard Top R&B Albums chart.

==== The Need of Love ====
In November 1971, EWF's second album, titled The Need of Love, was issued. The LP got to No. 35 on the Billboard Top Soul Albums chart. Bruce Lindsay of Jazz Journal said "as evidence of a tight, stylish, band in the early stages of its career this is a worthwhile album". Al Rudis of the Chicago Sun-Times wrote "Their second album, The Need of Love again displays some unusual music that might be called avant garde were it not so melodic and entrancing. The nine-member group mixes excellent jazzy instrumentals with harmony singing and chanting, some big band sounds and some free-form parts as well as solid soul beats. It all works beautifully, and while the elements of Earth, Wind and Fire aren't new, this mixture of them is a unique sound".

A single from the album called "I Think About Lovin' You" reached No. 44 on the Billboard Hot Soul Songs chart.

The band became popular on college campuses, although some members started to become restless and the band eventually split. With only Verdine left, Maurice decided to re-form the group.

During 1972, Maurice added vocalist Helena Davis, Ronnie Laws on the flute and saxophone, rhythm guitarist Roland Bautista, keyboardist Larry Dunn, vocalist Philip Bailey and percussionist Ralph Johnson. Davis was soon replaced by Jessica Cleaves, a former member of the R&B group The Friends of Distinction.

The band successfully auditioned for managers Bob Cavallo and Joe Ruffalo. Cavallo's management of John Sebastian led to a series of gigs as his opening act. A performance at New York's Rockefeller Center introduced EWF to Clive Davis, then-President of Columbia Records. Davis was impressed and bought their contract from Warner Bros. Wissert went along with the band.

==== Last Days and Time ====
Their debut album on CBS/Columbia Records, Last Days and Time, was issued in October 1972. The album got to No. 15 on the US Billboard Top Soul Albums chart and No. 9 on the UK Blues & Soul Top British Soul Albums chart. Paul Sexton of Record Mirror, in a 1979 review proclaimed, "Musical historians and EWF fans alike will welcome (Last Days and Time)". Ovid Goode Jr. of The Los Angeles Daily News declared "Last Days and Time, sprouts forth with a fresh sound that sets it apart from many of the ho-hum aggregations around today. The album consists of eight moving tunes". Hip-hop artist Nas was also inspired by the album's cover art while British singer Gabrielle also named Last Days and Time as one of her favorites.

A single called "Mom" got to No. 39 on the Cashbox Top R&B Singles chart.

Soon thereafter, Roland Bautista and Ronnie Laws left. Denver native Philip Bailey recommended former East High School classmate, saxophonist Andrew Woolfolk, as a replacement for Laws. Woolfolk had been busy in New York studying sax with sax maestro Joe Henderson and was due to start a career in banking at the time. To fill the void created by Bautista's departure, rhythm guitarists Al McKay and Johnny Graham were added. Graham previously played with New Birth, while McKay was a former member of the Ike and Tina Turner Revue and The Watts 103rd St. Rhythm Band.

==== Head to the Sky ====
EWF's fourth studio album, Head to the Sky, was released in May 1973. The album rose to No. 2 on the Billboard Top Soul Albums chart and No. 27 on the Billboard 200 chart. Head to the Sky was certified Platinum in the US by the RIAA.

Vince Aletti of Rolling Stone declared "Been having a lot of music dreams lately but this one's not too surprising since I've been playing the Earth, Wind & Fire album pretty constantly for the past week, certainly beyond all expectations". Aletti also noted EWF "sound like a cosmic choir and generate a Sly Stone effect" on the album. Tony Palermo of the Pittsburgh Press wrote "Folks like to compare this bunch with War, but the first difference that hits you with E,W&F's brand of jazz-rhythm and blues is the smoothness of Jessica Cleaves' vocal work. Then, the extra slug of R&B in their style".

A single off the LP titled "Evil" got to No. 19 on the Billboard Adult Contemporary Songs and No. 25 on the Billboard Hot Soul Songs charts respectively. Another single called "Keep Your Head to the Sky" rose to No. 23 on the Billboard Hot Soul Songs chart. Jessica Cleaves left after the album release.

==== Open Our Eyes ====
The band's follow-up album was co-produced by Maurice and Wissert. This LP was recorded at James William Guercio's Caribou Ranch Studio and Open Our Eyes was released in March 1974. Ken Emerson of Rolling Stone called Open Our Eyes "a pleasant miscellany of Africana, Latin rhythms, well-mannered funk, smooth jazz, Sly Stone, Stevie Wonder and the Fifth Dimension". The Village Voice's Robert Christgau described the album as a complete "tour de force". The album rose to No. 1 on the Billboard Top Soul Albums chart and No. 15 on the Billboard 200 chart. Open Our Eyes was certified US Platinum.

A single from the LP called "Mighty Mighty" reached No. 4 on the Billboard Hot Soul Songs chart and No. 29 on the Billboard Hot 100 chart. "Kalimba Story" rose to No. 6 on the Billboard Hot Soul Songs chart. "Devotion" got to No. 23 on the Billboard Hot Soul Songs chart and No. 33 on the Billboard Hot 100 chart.

After Open Our Eyes was issued, Maurice's younger brother, Fred White, joined the band. He had previously played in Chicago clubs as a drummer with Donny Hathaway and Little Feat.

On April 6, 1974, EWF performed at the California Jam, a West Coast rock festival that attracted an audience of 200,000. The concert was televised in the US on May 10, 1974, by ABC.

==== Another Time ====
In September 1974, a compilation double album titled Another Time, comprising songs from EWF's first two studio albums, was released by Warner Bros. The album got to No. 29 on the Billboard Top Soul Albums chart.

The band collaborated with Ramsey Lewis on his album Sun Goddess, which was produced by Maurice and issued in October 1974 by Columbia. The album got to No. 1 on the Billboard Top Soul Albums chart and No. 12 on the Billboard 200 chart. The LP's title track rose to No. 20 on the Billboard Hot Soul Songs chart. Sun Goddess was certified US Gold.

=== 1975–1980: Ornate sound ===
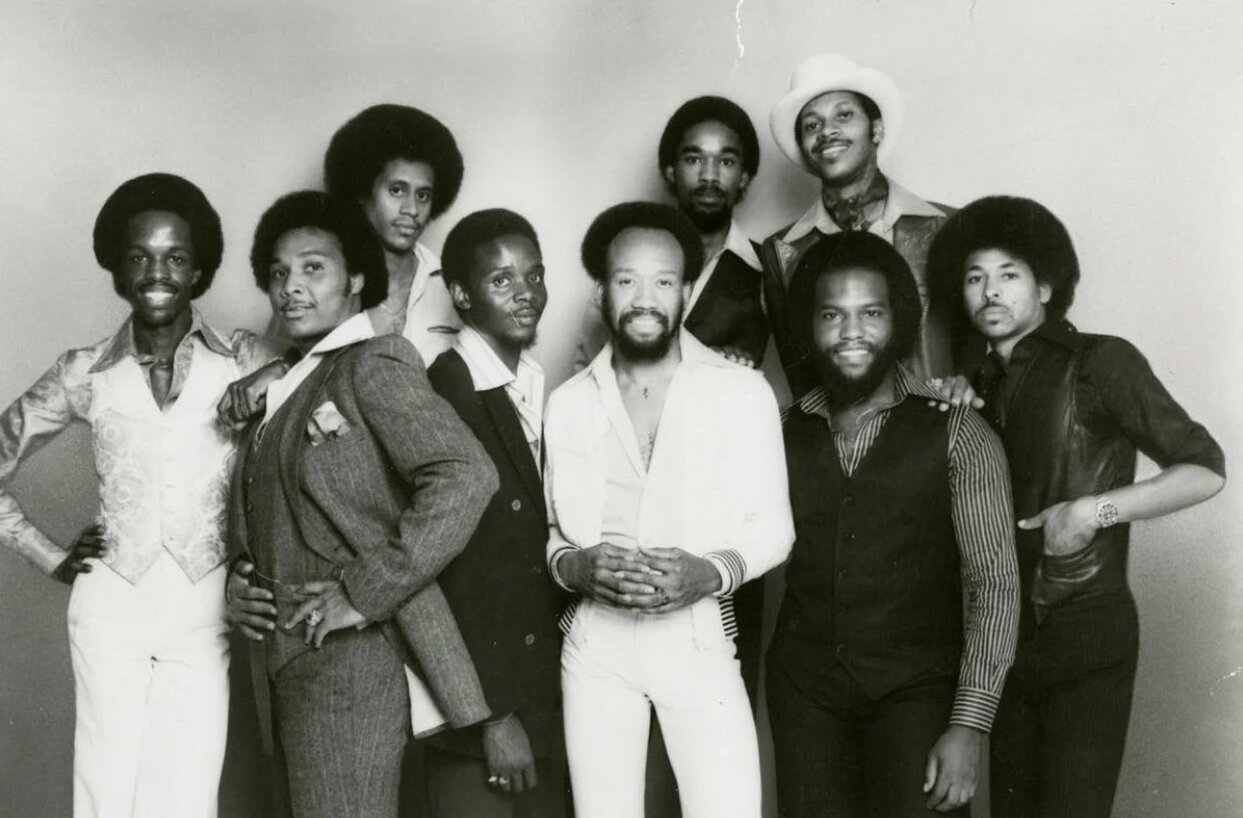
Earth, Wind, & Fire c. 1977. Front, from left: Verdine White, Al McKay, Philip Bailey, Maurice White, Andrew Woolfolk, Ralph Johnson. Back, from left: Larry Dunn, Fred White, Johnny Graham.

==== That's the Way of the World ====
During 1975, EWF was approached by Sig Shore, producer of Super Fly, to record the soundtrack of a new film called That's the Way of the World. With a screenplay from Robert Lipsyte, the film was produced and directed by Shore. The movie starred Harvey Keitel, Ed Nelson, EWF as "The Group" and Maurice as Early, "The Group"'s leader. Keitel played the role of a record producer who's wowed by a performance of "The Group".

When the band saw the film they were unimpressed and convinced it would be an eventual box office bomb. EWF therefore released the soundtrack before the film's premiere. Produced by both White and Charles Stepney, the album was recorded at the Caribou Ranch Studio. Stepney previously worked with artists such as the Dells, Terry Callier, Minnie Riperton and the Rotary Connection. His writing and production style also included a more ornate, orchestral flourish, which influenced EWF's sound then onwards.

That's the Way of the World was eventually released in March 1975 by Columbia. The album rose to No. 1 on both the Billboard 200 and Billboard Top Soul Albums charts. Stephen Curwood of The Boston Globe called the LP "a sound you shouldn't miss." Daryl Easlea of the BBC described That's the Way of the World as a "soul masterpiece". The album was certified US triple platinum.

From the LP came the single "Shining Star", which rose to No. 1 on both the Billboard Hot 100 and Hot Soul Singles charts. This made EWF the first black act to top both the Billboard album and singles charts. The song won a Grammy Award for Best R&B Performance by a Duo or Group with Vocals. The album's second single was title track "That's the Way of the World". It reached No. 5 on the Billboard Hot Soul Singles chart and No. 12 on the Hot 100 chart.

With the album's success the band could now craft their own horn section, entitled the Phenix Horns. They were composed of saxophonist Don Myrick, trombonist Louis Satterfield, and trumpeters Rahmlee Davis and Michael Harris. Both Myrick and Satterfield previously worked with Maurice during his days as a drummer at Chess Records.

==== Gratitude ====
After their first European tour, EWF returned to the studio in June 1975. The band eventually came away with an album of mostly live concert material together with some new recorded tunes. As a double album Gratitude was released in November 1975. Gratitude rose to No. 1 on both the Billboard 200 and Top Soul Albums charts respectively. Kit Aiken of Uncut called Gratitude "a kicking live album". Greg Kot of the Chicago Tribune found "an Ellingtonian fusion of styles on this live masterpiece." The album was certified US triple platinum.

With the LP came "Sing a Song", which rose to numbers 1 and 5 on the Billboard Hot Soul Songs and Hot 100 charts, respectively. "Can't Hide Love" got to No. 11 on the Billboard Hot Soul Songs chart. "Can't Hide Love" was Grammy nominated for Best Arrangement For Voices. The album's title track was also nominated for a Grammy in the category of Best R&B Performance by a Duo or Group with Vocals.

During 1975, White established a production company called Kalimba Productions. He signed artists such as his former bandleader Ramsey Lewis, singer Deniece Williams, a former member of Stevie Wonder's "Wonderlove" backup singers, and girl group the Emotions. Maurice also loaned out the Phenix Horns and other band members to various musical projects. Artists aligned with Kalimba Productions also regularly toured with EWF.

Alongside Maurice, Stepney began co-producing EWF's next album and Williams's debut LP, This Is Niecy. What's more, Ramsey Lewis's Salongo, and the Emotions' Flowers, their premiere album on Columbia Records. Suddenly Stepney died of a heart attack on May 17, 1976, in Chicago at the age of 45.

==== Spirit ====
After Stepney's passing, White went on to complete production of the band's new album. Eventually entitled Spirit as a tribute to Stepney, this LP was released in October 1976. The LP rose to No. 2 on both the Billboard Top Pop Albums and Top Soul Albums charts. Music Week proclaimed "With a more spiritual, ethereal feel than the six albums they had already cut to that point, it really marks a turning point in their career and is crammed with excellent tunes." John Abbey of Blues & Soul called Spirit "a mighty, mighty album...(displaying) the power of the nine-piece Earth Wind & Fire conglomeration." Spirit was certified US double platinum.

"Getaway" reached No. 1 on the Billboard Hot Soul Songs chart. The song also rose to No. 12 on both the Billboard Hot 100 and Dance Club Play charts. "Saturday Nite" reached numbers 4 and 21 on the Billboard Hot Soul Songs and Hot 100 charts, respectively. "Saturday Nite" rose to No. 12 on both the Billboard Dance Club Songs and UK Pop Singles charts, respectively. The track "Earth, Wind and Fire" was Grammy nominated for Best Instrumental Composition.

At the time EWF concerts became renowned for lots of pyrotechnics, magic, lasers, levitating guitarists and a flying pyramid. Magician Doug Henning worked on many of EWF's tours with then assistant and eventual successor, David Copperfield. George Faison also began choreographing their stage shows.

==== All 'n All ====
In November 1977, EWF released All 'n All, their eighth studio album. This record was inspired by Maurice's month-long trip throughout Argentina and Brazil. The album rose to No. 1 on the Billboard Top Soul Albums chart and No. 3 on the Billboard 200 chart. John Rockwell of The New York Times declared "All 'n All shows Maurice White and his cohorts pushing their music ever more in a febrile jazz‐rock direction." Monroe Anderson of the Chicago Tribune found "a rare blend of poetry, passion, and artistic progression...All 'N All is a nice indication that EW&F is trying to expose its fans to other forms of American music and take them across international and cultural borders."

All 'n All won a Grammy for Best R&B Vocal Performance By A Duo, Group Or Chorus. The album was certified US triple platinum.

"Serpentine Fire" rose to No. 1 on the Billboard Hot Soul Songs chart and No. 13 on the Billboard Hot 100. "Fantasy" reached No. 12 on the Billboard Hot Soul Songs chart and No. 14 on the UK Singles Chart. "Fantasy" was Grammy-nominated for Best R&B Song. "Runnin" won a Grammy for Best R&B Instrumental.

Thereafter the band performed a medley on a musical special hosted by Natalie Cole which aired in April 1978 on CBS. EWF later appeared in the July 1978 feature film Sgt. Pepper's Lonely Hearts Club Band, an eventual commercial failure. During the film EWF rendered a cover of the Beatles' "Got to Get You into My Life". This tune was the biggest hit single from the movie's soundtrack, reaching No. 1 on the US Billboard R&B songs chart and No. 9 on the US Billboard Pop singles chart. "Got to Get You into My Life" earned a Grammy nomination for Best Pop Vocal Performance by a Duo, Group or Chorus and won a Grammy in the category of Best Instrumental Arrangement Accompanying Vocalist(s). The film's soundtrack was also certified US platinum.

==== The Best of Earth, Wind & Fire, Vol. 1 ====
In 1978, White established a subsidiary label of CBS titled ARC Records (ARC). Alongside sound engineer George Massenburg, he thereafter launched a new recording studio called The Complex, in West Los Angeles. In November 1978, EWF released a compilation album entitled The Best of Earth, Wind & Fire, Vol. 1 on ARC/Columbia. This album rose to No. 3 on the Billboard Top Soul Albums chart and No. 6 on the Billboard 200 chart. The New York Daily News claimed "Since its beginning, Earth Wind and Fire have been one of the slickest soul aggregations around, and this record is a well-paced showcase. Sometimes it's hard to believe that the combination of influences, ranging from Sly Stone and Stevie Wonder to the decidedly Chicagoesque horn arrangements, doesn't overcome the group, but its high spirits continually take it over the top." Crispin Cioe of High Fidelity wrote "For pop/r&b mavens, this one's a must." The album was certified quintuple platinum in the US by the RIAA.

A new song called "September" was released as a single, peaking to No. 1 on the Billboard Hot Soul Songs chart and No. 8 on the Billboard Hot 100. "September" also reached No. 3 on the UK Singles Chart.

In January 1979, the band performed "September" and "That's the Way of the World" at the Music for UNICEF Concert. The concert was broadcast worldwide from the United Nations General Assembly. Other artists who performed at the event were ABBA, Andy Gibb, the Bee Gees, Olivia Newton-John, Donna Summer and Rod Stewart. The concert was Emmy-nominated in the category of Outstanding Individual Achievement - Special Class.

==== I Am ====
During June 1979, EWF issued their ninth studio album, I Am. The LP rose to No. 1 on the Billboard Top Soul Albums chart and No. 3 on the Billboard 200 chart. I Am was certified US double platinum.

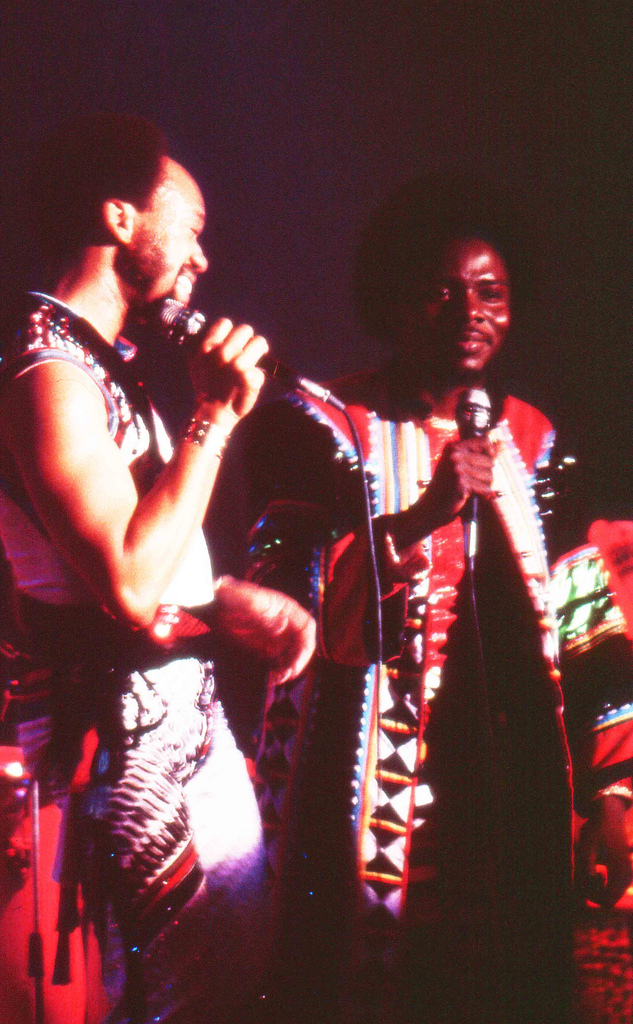
Earth, Wind, and Fire's Maurice White and Philip Bailey performing in 1979 at the Ahoy Rotterdam, The Netherlands

Eric Sieger of The Baltimore Sun called I Am "faultlessly produced...The album features a horn and string section, synthesizers, congas, and kalimbas and the material ranges from straight boogie to soulful ballads." James Johnson of the Evening Standard hailed the album saying, "On I Am..the band's flashy staccato rhythms, their smooth melodies and precise production adds up to another majestic album".

"Boogie Wonderland", featuring the Emotions, got to No. 2 on the Billboard Hot Soul Songs chart and No. 6 on the Billboard Hot 100. The song was also Grammy nominated in the categories of Best Disco Recording and Best R&B Instrumental Performance.

"After the Love Has Gone" reached No. 2 on both the Billboard Hot 100 and Hot Soul Songs charts. The song made No. 3 on both the Billboard Adult Contemporary Songs and UK Pop Singles charts. The ballad was Grammy-nominated in the category of Record of the Year. "After the Love Has Gone" won a Grammy for the Best R&B Vocal Performance by a Duo or Group.

==== Faces ====
During October 1980, EWF released a double album entitled Faces. Faces was rooted in the emerging post-disco style and partly recorded on the Caribbean island of Montserrat. The album rose to No. 2 on the Billboard Top Soul Albums chart and No. 10 on both the Billboard 200 and UK Albums charts. Faces was certified US gold.

In a 2007 interview, when asked which EWF album was his favorite, Maurice White replied: "Probably Faces because we were really in tune...and it gave us the opportunity to explore new areas." Soon after its release, longtime rhythm guitarist Al McKay left the band.

Dennis Hunt of the Los Angeles Times declared Faces is the R&B album of the year...Faces is expertly written, produced and performed and is considerably better than any of this year's hardcore R&B albums. Just about every song on Faces, which is nearly all upbeat, is high quality. Its danceability rating is as high as any you'll find on an album in this post-disco era. Chuck Pratt of the Chicago Sun Times exclaimed "this fine funk soul group puts its best face forward on this ambitious and generous double pocket set of intricately produced, high gloss funk."

A song off the LP titled "Let Me Talk" reached No. 8 on the Billboard R&B Singles chart and No. 29 on the UK Singles Chart. Another single called "You" got to No. 10 on the Billboard Hot R&B Singles chart and No. 30 on the Billboard Adult Contemporary Songs chart. "And Love Goes On" also rose to No. 15 on the Billboard R&B Singles chart.

=== 1981–1996: Electric sound ===
==== Raise! ====
White decided that, given the changing musical landscape, the band needed to incorporate into their work more of the electronic sound which was popular at the time. As a result, EWF's eleventh album, Raise!, was influenced by this new electronic sound and released in the Autumn of 1981. With this album rhythm guitarist Roland Bautista returned to EWF. Bautista went on to give the band's sound a bit of a hard rock feel with his playing. Raise! rose to No. 1 on the Billboard Top R&B Albums chart and No. 5 on the Billboard 200 chart. Raise was certified US Platinum.

Ken Tucker of Rolling Stone described Raise! as a reflection of "street-gritty black pop". J.D. Considine of The Baltimore Sun noted that the album puts "Earth, Wind & Fire back on the rock and roll road".

"Let's Groove" reached No. 1 on the Billboard Hot R&B Songs chart and No. 3 on the Billboard Hot 100 chart. This song was nominated for a Grammy in the category of Best R&B Performance by a Duo or Group with Vocals.

"I've Had Enough", got to No. 29 on the UK Pop Singles chart. "Wanna Be With You" also rose to No. 15 on the Billboard Hot Soul Singles chart. "Wanna Be With You" won a Grammy for Best R&B Performance by a Duo or Group with Vocals. On October 30, 1981, EWF appeared at American Bandstand's 30th Anniversary Special, where they performed "Let's Groove".

In 1981, the Phenix Horns also began collaborations with Phil Collins and Genesis.

==== Powerlight ====
During February 1983, EWF issued a studio album titled Powerlight. The album rose to No. 4 on the Billboard Top R&B Albums chart and No. 12 on the Billboard 200 chart. Powerlight was certified US Gold.

Hugh Wyatt of the New York Daily News found "Earth, Wind & Fire gives new meaning to the word classy, and I like it". Tony Prince of the Daily Mirror also called Powerlight the album of the week exclaiming "The worst you can say about Earth, Wind & Fire are their high standards of arrangements are predictable. They just can't get any better!".

"Fall in Love with Me" rose to No. 17 on the Billboard Hot 100 chart and No. 4 on the Billboard Hot R&B Songs chart. "Fall in Love with Me" was Grammy-nominated for Best R&B Performance by a Duo or Group with Vocals. "Side by Side" got to No. 15 on the Billboard Hot R&B Songs chart.

EWF went on to appear on the soundtrack of the April 1983 animated feature film Rock & Rule with the song "Dance, Dance, Dance". Artists such as Debbie Harry of Blondie, Lou Reed and Cheap Trick also featured on the soundtrack. LA Weekly noted the "standout track" is "Earth, Wind & Fire's funky club jam Dance, Dance, Dance". Rock & Rule was the first feature film of Nelvana Studios. Spin called Rock & Rule "the greatest oddball scifi musical ever committed to animation cels". Keith Breese of Contact Music described the movie as "a masterpiece of outré animation and wildly ambitious vision and remains a triumph in animated feature film". Rock & Rule has also gone on to become a cult classic.

==== Electric Universe ====
During November 1983, EWF issued their thirteenth studio album, titled Electric Universe. With this album a uniquely distinct new wave and synth pop sound came into being. The album got to No. 8 on the Billboard Top Soul Albums chart and No. 40 on the Billboard 200 chart.

Matty Karas of Rolling Stone opined "Electric Universe marks Earth, Wind & Fire's leap into the 80s. Horns are out, keyboards and synthesizers are in, and the group's romantic jazz-oriented funk has been dropped in favor of more sensuous, and at times, rock oriented dance material". Pam Lambert of The Wall Street Journal exclaimed "After more than a decade together, Earth, Wind and Fire continue to chart new ground". She added, "In Maurice's otherwordly universe of synthesized sound, individual instruments like guitars and keyboards are drowned into the overall sonic mix. But, by way of compensation, this does focus attention on the group's trademark, their multitextured vocals." Don McLeese of the Chicago Sun Times also gave Electric Universe an honorable mention in his list of the top ten albums of 1983.

"Magnetic" rose to No. 10 on the Billboard Hot R&B Songs chart and No. 36 on the Billboard Dance Club Songs chart. Music critic Robert Christgau of The Village Voice placed the song at number 20 on his dean's list of 1983. Another single, "Touch" got to No. 23 on the Billboard Hot R&B Songs chart.

==== Hiatus ====
Maurice thereafter decided the band needed a break, so he put EWF on hiatus in 1984.

During the hiatus, Maurice produced Barbra Streisand's 1984 album Emotion. He produced Ramsey Lewis on his 1985 album Fantasy. The album reached No. 13 on the Cashbox Jazz Albums chart. White released a self-titled solo album in 1985 on Columbia. The album rose to number 12 on the Billboard Top R&B Albums chart. A cover of Ben E. King's "Stand by Me" got to No. 6 on the Billboard Hot R&B Singles chart and No. 11 on the Billboard Adult Contemporary Songs chart. Another single, "I Need You", rose to No. 20 on the Billboard Adult Contemporary Songs chart and No. 30 on the Billboard Hot R&B Singles chart. White co-produced Pieces of a Dream's 1986 LP Joyride. The album reached No. 3 on the Billboard Traditional Jazz Albums chart and No. 18 on the Billboard Top Soul Albums chart. He then produced Neil Diamond on his 1986 album Headed for the Future. White later made a guest appearance on guitarist Lee Ritenour's 1986 Grammy-nominated album Earth Run and produced Ramsey Lewis on his 1987 album Keys to the City.

Philip Bailey issued his second solo album, Chinese Wall, in 1984 on Columbia. What's more in 1984 his debut gospel album, the Grammy nominated The Wonders of His Love was released. Bailey then made a guest appearance on Kenny Loggins' 1985 album Vox Humana. In 1986 Bailey released his third studio album entitled Inside Out along with his second Gospel LP, the Grammy winning Triumph. Bailey later appeared on Stevie Wonder's 1986 album In Square Circle and Ray Parker Jr.'s 1987 LP After Dark.

Ralph Johnson produced The Temptations on their 1984 album Truly for You. Verdine White also promoted go-go bands such as Trouble Funk and E.U. during this timespan A compilation album dubbed The Collection was released in 1986. The Collection peaked at No. 5 on the UK Pop album charts and was certified Gold by the British Phonographic Industry.

==== Touch the World ====
During 1987, Maurice went about reconvening the band. Coming back into the fold were Verdine, Johnson, Bailey and Woolfolk, while new members guitarist/vocalist Sheldon Reynolds, keyboardist Vance Taylor and drummer Sonny Emory completed the lineup. A new horn section dubbed Earth, Wind & Fire Horns was established, comprising Gary Bias on the saxophone, Raymond Lee Brown on the trumpet, and Reggie Young on flugelhorn and trombone.

With this came the studio album Touch the World which was issued in November 1987. Touch the World rose to No. 3 on the Billboard Top R&B Albums chart and No. 33 on the Billboard 200 chart. Touch the World was also certified US Gold.

Roe Hoeburger of Rolling Stone found "Bailey's falsetto sounds as pure and piercing as ever, but he often needs White's sly, low counterpunch to bring him back from the stratosphere." Pamela Bloom of High Fidelity proclaimed "Touch the World is nothing if not contemporary (but)..the message, as always, is stop, step back, and turn up your light". Touch the World was also nominated for a Soul Train Award in the category of Best R&B/Soul Album of the Year - Group, Band or Duo.

Skylark penned "System of Survival" for the album. It became a hit single, going to number one on both the Billboard R&B and Dance charts. "System of Survival" was nominated for a Soul Train Award in the category of Best R&B/Soul Single – Group, Band or Duo. "Thinking of You" got to No. 1 on the Billboard Dance Club Songs chart and No. 3 on the Billboard Hot R&B/Hip-Hop Songs chart.

==== The Best of Earth, Wind & Fire, Vol. 2 ====
During November 1988, EWF issued a compilation album titled The Best of Earth, Wind & Fire, Vol. 2. The album was certified US Gold. A new single, from the album, called "Turn on (The Beat Box)" reached No. 26 on the Billboard Hot R&B Songs chart. EWF went on to be nominated for an NAACP Image Award in the category of Best Vocal Group.

==== Heritage ====
During February 1990, EWF issued their fifteenth studio album, entitled Heritage. The album rose to No. 19 on the Billboard Top R&B Albums chart and No. 18 on the UK Blues & Soul Top British Soul Albums chart.

J.D. Considine of The Baltimore Sun declared "Earth, Wind & Fire has not only kept its sound current, but on Heritage actually seems invigorated by the process of change". Paul Robicheau of The Boston Globe also described Heritage as a "fresh and funky outing". As well Lynden Barber of The Sydney Morning Herald placed Heritage at No. 7 on his list of the top ten albums of 1990.

The title track, featuring The Boys, got to No. 5 on the Billboard Hot R&B Songs chart. "For the Love of You", featuring MC Hammer, rose to No. 19 on the Billboard Hot R&B Songs chart.

The band appeared on the compilation album Music Speaks Louder Than Words released in 1990 on Epic Records. Artists such as Phoebe Snow, Roberta Flack, Cyndi Lauper, Patti LaBelle, Animotion, Atlantic Starr, and Anne Murray appeared on the album. With songs composed by both American as well as Soviet musicians and songwriters. Some of the album's royalties also went to the AFS Intercultural Programs, a globally based student exchange organization.

==== The Eternal Dance ====
During 1992, EWF issued a compilation album called The Eternal Dance. The LP was the band's first ever boxset. The Boston Globe placed The Eternal Dance on their lists of the top ten recordings of both 1992 and 1993. On July 30, 1993, former Phenix Horns saxophonist Don Myrick was fatally shot by an officer of the Santa Monica Police Department.

==== Millennium ====
During September 1993, came the release of the band's 16th studio album, Millennium issued on Warner Bros. Records. Artists such as Ronnie Laws and Prince appeared on the LP. The album also rose to No. 8 on the Billboard Top R&B Albums chart and No. 39 on the Billboard 200 chart. Millennium was certified Gold in Japan by the RIAJ.

Andy Gill of The Independent stated "if it's an old-style R&B sensibility you're after, the new Earth, Wind & Fire album may be just the ticket." Renee Graham of The Boston Globe noted that Millennium "returns the band to its funk/r&b roots". The Buffalo News placed Millennium on its list of the best R&B/Hip-Hop albums of 1993. Millennium was also nominated for a Soul Train Music Award in the category of Best R&B/Soul Album - Group, Band or Duo.

"Sunday Morning" got to No. 10 on the US Billboard Adult R&B Songs chart, No. 20 on the US Billboard Hot R&B Songs chart, No. 35 on the US Billboard Adult Contemporary Songs chart, and No. 33 on the RPM Top Canadian Singles chart. It was nominated for a Grammy in the category of Best R&B Vocal Performance by a Duo or Group. "Spend the Night" rose to No. 36 on the Billboard Adult R&B Songs chart.

On October 13 of that year, former lead vocalist Wade Flemons died from cancer in Battle Creek, Michigan.

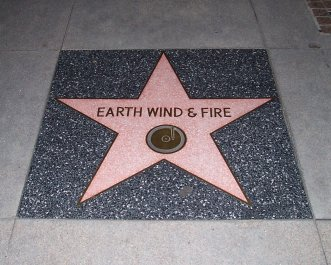
Earth, Wind & Fire star on the Hollywood Walk of Fame

In November 1993, EWF performed at the American Music Awards 20th anniversary special. During 1994, EWF was inducted into the NAACP Image Award Hall of Fame. On September 14 of the following year, the band received another tribute in the form of a star on the Hollywood Walk of Fame. With Maurice, Sonny Emory, Sheldon Reynolds, Bailey, Johnson, Woolfolk and Verdine attending the said inauguration ceremony.

=== 1996–present: Neo period ===
During 1996, Maurice launched a new label titled Kalimba Records based in Santa Monica, California. With the launch of this said label also came into being a recording studio known as Magnet Vision.

==== In the Name of Love ====
EWF's follow-up studio album, In the Name of Love, was released in 1997 on Rhino Records. The album went on to be noted as one with a digitised neo soul sound and style. Phyl Garland of Stereo Review wrote "with this set of skillfully shaped songs, White has positioned Earth, Wind & Fire to move into the next century". Dan Glaister of The Guardian described In the Name of Love as "a scorching album". The LP reached No. 19 on the UK R&B Albums chart. From the album, a track titled "When Love Goes Wrong" got to No. 33 on the Billboard Adult R&B Songs chart. Another song called "Change Your Mind" was issued as a single in 2006 by Kalimba. "Change Your Mind" rose to No. 26 on the Billboard Adult R&B Songs chart.

During the previous year, Maurice stopped regularly touring, but still appeared on stage occasionally. He explained that he wanted rest from the rigors of the road. Bailey took the role of on stage leader. Maurice maintained executive control.

The band appeared on Wu Tang Clan offshoot Sunz of Man's 1998 debut album The Last Shall Be First. EWF gave an encore performance at the 1997 and 1998 Montreux Jazz Festivals.

During Spring 1999, EWF appeared on the soundtrack of the animated sitcom The PJs.

==== The Ultimate Collection ====
The band issued a compilation album titled The Ultimate Collection on Columbia. The album reached No. 34 upon the UK Pop Albums Chart. A remix by UK dance duo Phats and Small called "September '99" got to No. 1 on the Canadian Dance Songs chart and No. 25 on the UK Pop Singles chart.

In 1999, the group performed on the A&E Network show Live by Request. Website Startalk.org was set up in 1999 in Maurice's honor. Maurice later spoke of a mild affliction with Parkinson's disease. Artists such as Steven Tyler of Aerosmith, Boyz II Men, Smokey Robinson, Isaac Hayes, Michael Jackson, Eric Clapton and Tom Morello of Rage Against the Machine posted messages on the site for White. Maurice, however, had the disease under control, so much so that he occasionally made appearances at EWF performances, and continued to write, record, produce and develop new recordings.

On March 6, 2000, EWF was inducted into the Rock and Roll Hall of Fame by hip-hop artist Lil' Kim to a standing ovation during the 15th annual ceremony held at New York's Waldorf-Astoria Hotel. Maurice, Bailey, Verdine, and Johnson, as well as former EWF members Al McKay, Larry Dunn, Woolfolk, Fred White and Johnny Graham attended the ceremony. At the gala they performed "Shining Star" and "That's the Way of the World".

EWF was a specially-invited music guest at the June 20, 2000 White House state dinner hosted by President Bill Clinton on the South Lawn of the White House, in honor of His Majesty Mohammed VI, King of Morocco, and Her Royal Highness Princess Lalla Meryem. So impressed was the king by the band's performance that he made a personal request for EWF to perform in Morocco for his 37th birthday celebration on August 21, 2000. EWF collaborated with Wyclef Jean on his second studio album, The Ecleftic: 2 Sides II a Book, which was issued in August 2000.

In 2001, a biographical documentary of the band titled Shining Stars: The Official Story Of Earth, Wind & Fire was released, directed by Kathryn Arnold. Following the September 11 attacks of that year, the band members donated $25,000 to the American Red Cross at a September 13 show at Virginia's Verizon Wireless Virginia Beach Amphitheater, the band's first concert following those events. February 24, 2002, saw EWF performing at the closing ceremonies of the 2002 Winter Olympics held in Salt Lake City, Utah. On June 17, 2002, EWF was bestowed with the ASCAP Rhythm & Soul Heritage Award at the Beverly Hilton Hotel in Beverly Hills, California. The award was presented by ASCAP President and Chairman Marilyn Bergman, Stevie Wonder, and Jimmy Jam. On June 25, 2002, EWF was bestowed with a BET Lifetime Achievement Award.

==== The Essential Earth, Wind & Fire ====
Within July 2002 a compilation album titled The Essential Earth, Wind & Fire was issued by Columbia. Howard Dukes of SoulTracks called the album "a collection that will definitely get the party started". Barry Walters of Blender, opined "the 34 tracks on The Essential encompass these funky spiritualists' many sides, from preachy ("All About Love") to sensual ("Can't Hide Love") to ecstatic ("Boogie Wonderland")." The album was certified US Gold. A remix sampler of both "Can't Hide Love" and "Let's Groove" was released as a single from the LP. The remix sampler got to No. 4 on the UK Dance Singles Chart. A live album of the band's 1980 performance in Rio de Janeiro, Brazil, titled Live In Rio, was later released in November 2002.

==== The Promise ====
During May 2003, EWF issued The Promise. The album peaked at No. 19 on the Billboard Top R&B/Hip-Hop Albums chart and No. 5 on the Billboard Top Independent Albums chart. David Peschek of The Guardian described The Promise as "17 tracks of immaculately smooth, meticulously detailed mid-tempo pop-soul and thoroughly intoxicating in its lushness." Steve Jones of USA Today wrote "with horn-kissed ballads and infectious jazz funk grooves, the band seems to have regained its spark".

Guest artists such as Angie Stone, The Emotions and Gerald Albright appeared on the album. "All in the Way", featuring The Emotions, got to No. 13 on the Billboard Adult R&B Songs chart, No. 25 on the Billboard Adult Contemporary Songs chart and No. 31 on the UK R&B Singles chart. Another single, "Hold Me" reached No. 28 on the Billboard Adult R&B Songs chart. "Hold Me" earned a Grammy nomination in the category of Best Traditional R&B Vocal Performance.

On July 7, 2003, the band was inducted into Hollywood's Rockwalk. In September 2003, EWF were inducted into the Vocal Group Hall of Fame. On February 8, 2004, Earth, Wind Fire performed in a tribute to funk, along with Parliament Funkadelic, OutKast, and Robert Randolph and the Family Band, at the 46th annual Grammy Awards held at the Staples Center, Los Angeles, California. At first EWF sang "Shining Star", with Outkast's request collaborated on "The Way You Move" and Robert Randolph and the Family Band then performed their new single "I Need More Love". All of those said groups thereafter joined Parliament Funkadelic to warble "Give Up the Funk (Tear the Roof off the Sucker)".

On the May 2004 tribute album Power of Soul: A Tribute to Jimi Hendrix, EWF covered Jimi Hendrix's "Voodoo Child (Slight Return)". The band was later bestowed with the NARAS Signature Governors Award on June 8, 2004, at Los Angeles' Beverly Hills Hotel. On September 27, 2004, former Phenix Horns trombonist Louis Satterfield died at the age of 67.

On December 11, 2004, EWF was honored at the first annual Grammy Jam held at Los Angeles's Wiltern Theater. Artists such as Stevie Wonder, Yolanda Adams, India Arie, George Benson, Sheila E., Kirk Whalum, George Duke, Usher, Boney James and Jill Scott paid performing tributes to the band. With celebs like Victoria Rowell, Pamela Anderson, Cherrelle, Jimmy Jam and Terry Lewis, Tim Allen, Prince, Regina King, Dawn Robinson of En Vogue, Nick Cannon, Suzanne De Passe, and Traci Bingham also attending this inaugural Grammy Jam. EWF performed on Dick Clark's New Year's Rockin' Eve on December 31, 2004. The February 6, 2005, Super Bowl XXXIX pregame show in Jacksonville, Florida saw the band teaming with The Black Eyed Peas to sing "Where Is the Love?" and "Shining Star".

During both 2004 and 2005, Earth, Wind & Fire and Chicago embarked upon consecutive joint national summer tours. A filmed concert held at Los Angeles' Greek Theater in June 2004 was issued on DVD in June of the following year. As well this concert entitled Chicago & Earth, Wind & Fire – Live at the Greek Theatre was eventually certified Platinum in the US by the RIAA.

Chicago and EWF later collaborated for a new recording of Chicago's ballad "If You Leave Me Now", that was included on Chicago's 2005 compilation album Love Songs. At the 57th Primetime Emmy Awards held on September 18, 2005, at Los Angeles' Shrine Auditorium, the band performed as the opening act with The Black Eyed Peas.

==== Illumination ====
During September 2005, Illumination, EWF's 19th studio album, was issued on Sanctuary Records. On this album EWF collaborated with artists such as will.i.am, Kelly Rowland, Outkast's Big Boi, Floetry and Brian McKnight. Illumination reached No. 8 on the Billboard Top R&B/Hip-Hop Albums chart and No. 32 on the Billboard 200 chart.

Ben Thompson of The Daily Telegraph found the "E,W&F blend of taut horns, expansive bass-playing and psychedelic harmonies keeps on shining through." Jim Farber of the New York Daily News said "Their latest work features production and/or guest appearances from current hit makers like Will I. Am from the Black Eyed Peas, Big Boi from OutKast, Kelly Rowland from Destiny's Child, plus Jimmy Jam and Terry Lewis, Raphael Saadiq and others. All these guests haven't overwhelmed Maurice White's great band. They've just freshened it up. Singer Philip Bailey sounds as buttery as ever, and the band's tart horn arrangements and melodies extend the buoyancy and pleasure of their hits." Illumination received a Grammy nomination for Best R&B Album and a Soul Train Music Award nomination in the category of Best R&B-Soul Album. EWF received an NAACP Image Award nomination for Outstanding Duo or Group.

A song from the album, called "Pure Gold", reached No. 23 on the Billboard Adult Contemporary Songs chart. EWF also covered Outkast's "The Way You Move" featuring saxophonist Kenny G. The single got to No. 12 on the Billboard Adult Contemporary Songs chart. Another single titled "Show Me The Way", featuring neo soul singer Raphael Saadiq got to No. 16 on the Billboard Adult R&B Songs chart. Show Me The Way was also Grammy nominated in the category of Best R&B Performance by a Duo or Group with Vocals.

In 2006, Maurice worked with Maurice Hines, brother of famed entertainer Gregory Hines, to release the Broadway play Hot Feet. This was a jukebox musical with the theme of the music of Earth, Wind & Fire. Maurice co-wrote with Allee Willis several new songs for the play. On February 11, 2007, EWF performed "Runaway Love" alongside Mary J. Blige and Ludacris at the 49th Grammy Awards held at Los Angeles's Staples Center.

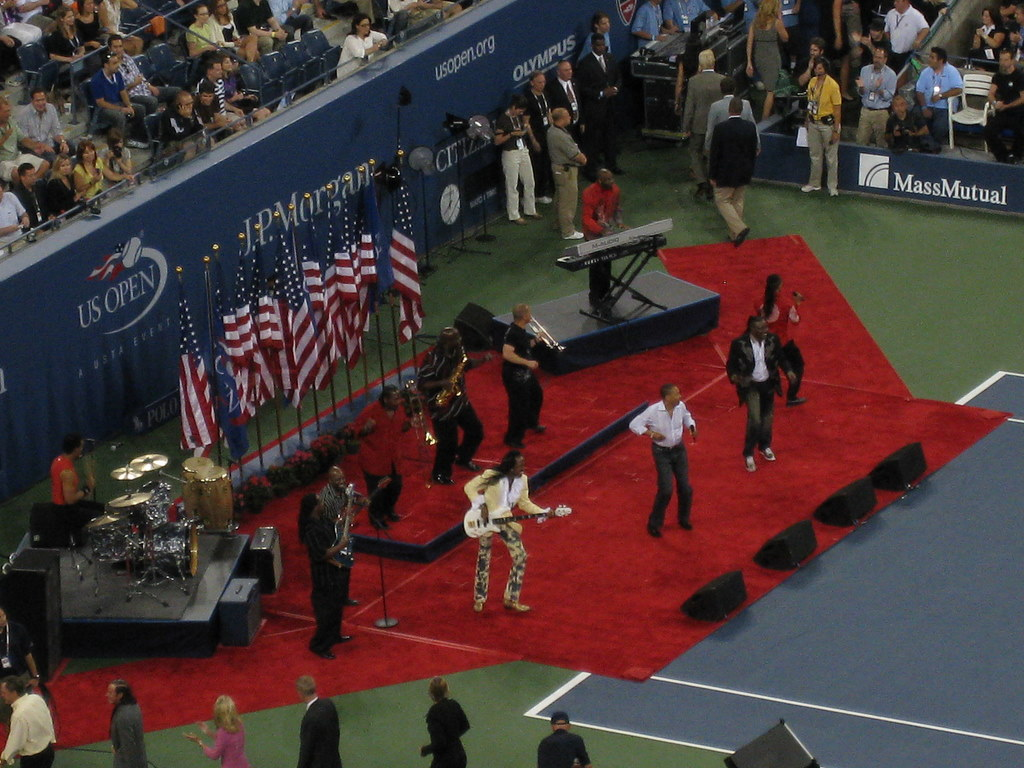
Earth, Wind & Fire performing at the opening ceremony of the 2008 U.S. Open August 25, 2008

Interpretations: Celebrating the Music of Earth, Wind & Fire, an album featuring cover versions of EWF's material, was released in March 2007 on Stax Records. Executively produced by Maurice, the LP featured artists such as Chaka Khan, Kirk Franklin, Lalah Hathaway, Mint Condition, Dwele, Meshell Ndegeocello, and Angie Stone. The album rose to no. 28 on the Billboard Top R&B/Hip-Hop Albums chart. Kirk Franklin's cover of September reached No. 17 on the Billboard Adult R&B Songs chart and No. 26 on the Billboard Hot Gospel Songs chart. Dwele's rendition of "That's the Way of the World" and Meshell Ndegeocello's cover of "Fantasy" were each nominated for Grammies in the category of Best Urban/Alternative Performance.

On April 25, 2007, EWF performed as the opening act at a special edition of American Idol entitled "Idol Gives Back". At the gala the band performed a medley of "Boogie Wonderland", "Shining Star" and "September". At the Nobel Peace Prize Concert in Oslo, Norway, on December 11, 2007, EWF performed "Fantasy" and "September". The concert was broadcast to over 100 countries. Artists such as Melissa Etheridge, Alicia Keys, Annie Lennox, and Kylie Minogue also performed at the concert.

During February 2008, EWF performed on the opening night of one of the oldest and largest musical festivals in Latin America, Chile's Viña del Mar Festival. The audience at the gala was so impressed by EWF's performance that the band was bestowed with the Gaviota de Plata (The Silver Seagull), the festival's highest performance award. EWF's song "In the Stone" has been used for several years as the introductory theme for festival broadcasts.

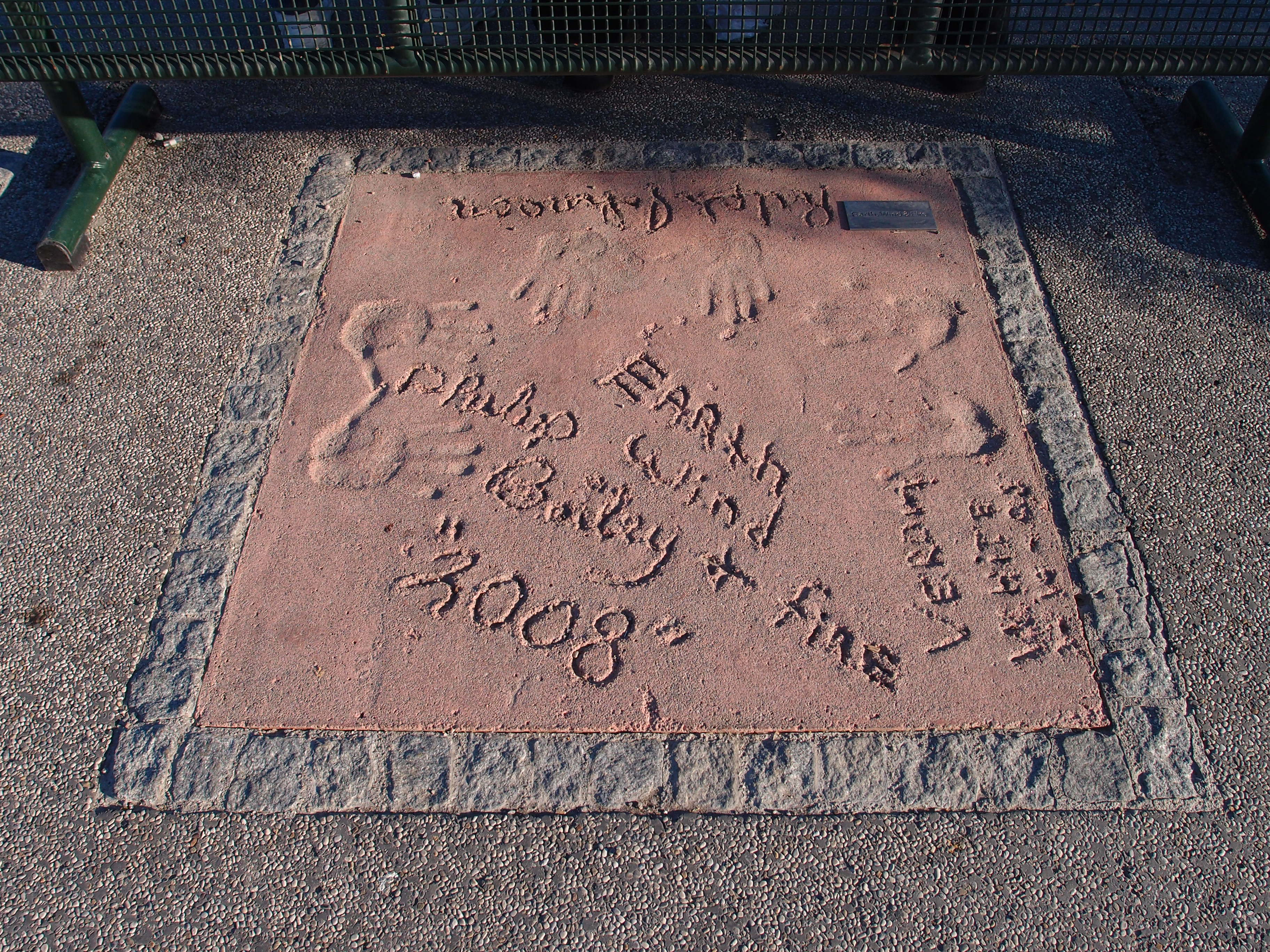
Earth, Wind & Fire tribute, Munich Olympic Walk of Stars on April 9, 2011

On March 10, 2008, the band was inducted into the Munich Olympic Walk Of Stars. During May 2008 EWF performed at the Apollo Theater's fourth annual Hall of Fame induction ceremony. Maurice and Verdine, Johnson, and Bailey each received an honorary degree from the Arts and Media College at Columbia College Chicago's 2008 commencement exercises. During the ceremony Verdine and Johnson both gave acceptance speeches before the four gave an impromptu performance of "Shining Star". EWF performed at the opening ceremony of the 2008 US Open, which was hosted by Forest Whitaker and served to commemorate the 40th anniversary of the founding of tennis' Open Era with a parade of more than 25 former US Open singles champions.

EWF performed at the White House on February 22, 2009, for the Governors' Dinner; they were the first musical artists to perform there after Barack Obama took office. During April 2009 former EWF keyboardist Robert Brookins died from a heart attack, at the age of 46. On April 26, 2009, EWF appeared at the 39th New Orleans Jazz & Heritage Festival. The band aligned with Chicago once again for a joint tour. In September 2009 EWF were bestowed with the Daniel L. Stephenson award for lifetime achievement in music at the Temecula Valley International Film and Music Festival.

During February 2010 the band participated in the recording of the "We Are the World 25 for Haiti" single. Within that year Maurice, Verdine, and Bailey together with former EWF members McKay and Dunn were inducted into the Songwriter's Hall of Fame.

In November 2011, the band received the Legend Award at the Soul Train Awards at Atlanta, Georgia's Fox Theatre. In 2012, EWF were bestowed with a Lifetime Achievement Award at the 20th Annual Trumpet Awards, held at Cobb Energy Performing Arts Centre in Atlanta. On February 29, 2012, former EWF rhythm guitarist Roland Bautista died, at the age of 60.

EWF, along with former Pussycat Doll Melody Thornton and Charlie Wilson, guested on the LL Cool J track "Something About You". The song appeared on his 2013 album Authentic.

==== Now, Then & Forever ====
Now, Then & Forever, the group's first album in eight years, was released on September 10, 2013, by Legacy Recordings/Sony Music. Artists such as Siedah Garrett, former bandmate Larry Dunn and Terrence Blanchard made guest appearances upon the LP. The album was also the first without musical input from founder Maurice White, although he contributed to its liner notes. The album reached No. 25 on the UK Pop Album Charts, No. 11 on the US Billboard 200 and No. 6 on the US Top R&B/Hip-Hop Albums chart. Now, Then & Forever was also certified Gold in the UK by the BPI.

Emerys Baird of Blues & Soul called the album a "glorious return to form. EW&F have produced an incredibly well balanced body of work, a set full of contrast and colour, sublime stuff." Elias Leight of Popmatters also wrote "Now, Then & Forever has all the old colors and grooves, an impeccable rhythm section, prominent guitars, and indomitable horns that trace and re-trace motifs, dancing rings around everything."

A song from the album called "Guiding Lights" was released as a single and rose to No. 16 on the Billboard Smooth Jazz Songs chart and No. 30 on the Billboard Adult R&B Songs chart. Another single, "My Promise", reached No. 28 on the Billboard Adult R&B Songs chart and No. 30 on the Billboard Adult Contemporary Songs chart.

Singles Never and Why?, from The Promise, were later issued in 2014. "Never" rose to No. 17 on the Billboard Smooth Jazz Songs chart. "Why?" got to No. 19 on the Billboard Smooth Jazz Songs chart.

==== Holiday ====
On January 13, 2014, former percussionist Beloyd Taylor, who co-wrote the band's 1976 hit "Getaway", died. During February 2014, EWF performed alongside Pharrell, Janelle Monae at the 2014 NBA All-Star Game. On May 2, former lead vocalist Jessica Cleaves died at age 65.

On September 13, 2014, EWF performed at Proms in the Park at Hyde Park with the BBC Concert Orchestra. On October 21, 2014, EWF released their first ever holiday album, titled Holiday. Randy Lewis of the Los Angeles Times gave the album a 3 out of five stars rating and wrote "The venerable R&B band does what it does best here: lays on the hard and heavy funk with fat horn accents and thick rhythmic riffs to propel a batch of time-tested holiday favorites." Brett Milano of OffBeat also proclaimed "If you need to funkify your holiday mix..this will do fine." Holiday rose to No. 26 on the Billboard Top R&B/Hip Hop Albums chart and No. 8 on the Billboard Holiday Albums chart. On December 8, 2014, EWF performed at the Kennedy Center Honors, honoring Al Green. On December 14, 2014, the band performed at the Christmas in Washington event.

Maurice White died on February 4, 2016. He was survived by his wife, his two sons, daughter and his brothers Verdine and Fred. Along with EWF, Maurice was posthumously bestowed with a Grammy Lifetime Achievement Award at the annual Grammy Awards ceremony on February 15, 2016. At the ceremony Stevie Wonder and Pentatonix performed a rendition of "That's the Way of the World" in tribute to White. On December 4 of that year, the band were also honoured with a Ebony Lifetime Achievement Award at the Ebony Power 100 Gala held in the Beverly Hilton in Beverly Hills, California.

On June 6, 2017, EWF performed in downtown Nashville, Tennessee at the CMT concert series program, CMT Crossroads, with artists such as Dan + Shay, Martina McBride, Rascall Flatts, Antebellum, Darius Rucker and Sara Evans. A performance of "September" with Antebellum on the show was nominated for a CMT Music Award in the category of Performance of the Year. During Summer 2017 the band went on a North American tour entitled, 2054-The Tour, with Chic.

EWF went on to perform on the forum float at the 2018 Rose Parade held in Pasadena, California. On May 2, 2018, the band started a Las Vegas Residency at the Venetian Theatre, Las Vegas, Nevada.

On September 10, 2019, The Los Angeles City Council declared that September 21 would be dedicated Earth, Wind & Fire Day. On November 22 of that year the band received the Portrait of a Nation Prize at the Smithsonian's American Portrait Gala. EWF were one of the inductees at the 42nd Kennedy Center Honors that took place on December 7, 2019. EWF became the first Black group to be inducted into Kennedy Honors. The band later guested on Meghan Trainor's October 2020 Christmas studio album A Very Trainor Christmas. A song off the album called Holidays rose to No. 10 on the Billboard Holiday Digital Song Sales chart and No. 35 on the Billboard Canadian Adult Contemporary chart.

During September 2021, EWF reached the top 10 of Billboard's Adult R&B Airplay chart for the first time in 28 years with their new single "You Want My Love", featuring Lucky Daye. On April 24, 2022, former saxophonist Andrew Woolfolk died at the age of 71. The band later embarked on a joint summer tour with Carlos Santana and made a guest appearance on the Isley Brothers' September 2022 album Make Me Say It Again, Girl.

On January 1, 2023, it was announced that former drummer Fred White had died at the age of 67.

In March 2023, Earth, Wind & Fire IP, LLC filed a lawsuit for copyright infringement and trademark dilution against Substantial Music Group and Stellar Communications which had launched an Earth, Wind & Fire Legacy Reunion group. In March 2024, a federal judge in Miami ruled in favor of the trademarked Earth, Wind & Fire group against the tribute group, which contains former side musicians and has no original members.

Earth, Wind & Fire later announced a joint tour, due to occur in summer 2023, with Lionel Richie. The band later appeared on Victoria Monét's 2023 album Jaguar II. A song off the album called, "Hollywood" featuring EW&F and Monet's daughter Hazel, earned a Grammy nomination in the category of Best Traditional R&B Performance.

On August 3, 2025, Earth, Wind & Fire appeared as guests of Sabrina Carpenter during her headline set at Lollapalooza, where they sang "Let's Groove" and "September".

On August 6, 2026, the band postponed its San Francisco show after drummer John Paris suffered a cardiac incident and was rushed to the hospital, where he was listed as in critical condition. The group's tour subsequently continued with former drummer Sonny Emory standing in for Paris.

== Legacy ==
=== Influence ===
EWF has influenced artists such as Alicia Keys, Usher, Janet Jackson, will.i.am, Janelle Monáe, Mary J. Blige, Prince, Kelly Rowland, India Arie, Jon Secada, and Wyclef Jean. They have also been influential to musical acts like Angie Stone, Patrice Rushen, Pharrell Williams, The All-American Rejects, Nelly Teena Marie, Musiq Soulchild, Solange Knowles, Babyface, Taylor Dayne, Will Gregory of Goldfrapp, Outkast, and Gloria Estefan.

Other artists such as Jamiroquai, Melissa Etheridge, Pitbull, Lenny Kravitz, Vanessa Williams, Joe Jonas of the Jonas Brothers, Justice Omarion, Rob Bourdon of Linkin Park, Jill Scott, and Justin Timberlake have also proclaimed being influenced by EWF. The band has also influenced musical acts such as Bonnie Raitt, Mark Ronson, Erykah Badu, Jamie Foxx, Common, Patrick Stump of Fall Out Boy, Lalah Hathaway, Amy Winehouse, and Meghan Trainor.

=== Acclaim via contemporaries ===
Miles Davis described EWF as his "all time favorite band", saying, "they have everything (horns, electric guitar, singers and more) in one band". Quincy Jones proclaimed himself to be the "biggest fan of Earth, Wind & Fire since day one." Dionne Warwick named Earth, Wind & Fire her favorite group of all time.

=== Theatrical depictions ===
In the movie Baadasssss!, actor Khalil Kain portrayed a young Maurice White leading the earliest incarnation of Earth, Wind & Fire. Released at the 2004 Sundance Film Festival, the film was based on Melvin Van Peebles' struggle to film and distribute the motion picture Sweet Sweetback's Baadasssss Song and was directed by his son Mario Van Peebles. Baadasssss! earned an NAACP Image Award nomination in the category of Outstanding Independent Motion Picture.

Hot Feet, a jukebox musical based on the Earth, Wind & Fire song catalog, opened on Broadway in April 2006. It closed in July of that year, losing its entire $8 million investment.

== Members ==
- Verdine White – bass, backing vocals (1969–1984, 1987–present)
- Philip Bailey Sr. – lead vocals, conga, percussion, kalimba (1972–1984, 1987–present)
- Ralph Johnson – percussion, backing vocals (1972–1984, 1987–present); drums (1972–1979)
- B. David Whitworth – percussion, vocals (1996–present)
- Myron McKinley – keyboards, musical director (2001–present)
- John Paris – drums, vocals (2001–present)
- Morris O'Connor – lead guitar, vocals (2008–present)
- Oshun Shango Oshunde (born Philip Doron Bailey Jr., also known as Lion From The Moon) – vocals, percussion (2009–present)
- Serg Dimitrijevic – rhythm guitar, vocals (2012–present)

== Discography ==
Studio albums

- Earth, Wind & Fire (1971)
- The Need of Love (1971)
- Last Days and Time (1972)
- Head to the Sky (1973)
- Open Our Eyes (1974)
- That's the Way of the World (1975)
- Gratitude (1975)
- Spirit (1976)
- All 'n All (1977)
- I Am (1979)
- Faces (1980)
- Raise! (1981)
- Powerlight (1983)
- Electric Universe (1983)
- Touch the World (1987)
- Heritage (1990)
- Millennium (1993)
- In the Name of Love (1997)
- The Promise (2003)
- Illumination (2005)
- Now, Then & Forever (2013)
- Holiday (2014)

== See also ==
- List of best-selling music artists
- List of number-one hits (United States)
- List of artists who reached number one in the United States
- List of number-one dance hits (United States)
- List of artists who reached number one on the U.S. dance chart
