= Imagination (Helen Reddy album) =

Studio album by Helen Reddy
- Released: February 1983
- Recorded: 1982
- Studios: Hollywood Sound Recorders; Hollywood, California
- Length: 35:22
- Label: MCA
- Producer: Joe Wissert

Helen Reddy chronology
Play Me Out (1981)	Imagination (1983)	Feel So Young (1990)

Professional ratings
Review scores
Source	Rating
AllMusic	4/5 stars

Imagination is the fourteenth studio album by Australian-American pop singer Helen Reddy and was released in February 1983 as her second LP for MCA Records. As with the first of the two, 1981's Play Me Out, it did not reach Billboard magazine's Top LP's & Tapes chart. MCA ended their contract with her afterward; in her 2006 autobiography, The Woman I Am: A Memoir, Reddy wrote, "I was not surprised when I received a form letter from [MCA]'s legal department telling me that I'd been dropped from the label."

== History ==
The path from the planning stages for the album to its appearance on store shelves was not a smooth one. A story on Reddy from the September 19, 1981, issue of Billboard detailed some of what she had in mind for this second MCA project: "'I'll work on my next album around the end of the year or in January or February so it'll be ready for an Easter [1982] release,'" she told the magazine, but it didn't come out until 1983. She also told them that "Joel Diamond, who produced the first MCA project, will also handle production on the next LP," but that job went to Joe Wissert.

In the liner notes of Reddy's 1996 compilation CD When I Dream, Brian Giorgi explains that the changes in the music industry in 1983 that sealed the fate of this album were not just in top 40 radio programming. "Changes were also taking place within her record company. The top level management which had brought her to MCA Records was gone." Reddy concurred: "Between the time of recording and the time of release of the Imagination album there was a major shakeup in the executive offices at MCA records," and instead of the person "who would have known how to market and promote the new album to my demographic, I was now dealing with someone of much lower stature in the industry." She found out how much lower when the album arrived in stores:

The day that the Imagination album was released I went to Tower Records in Westwood to see what sort of promotion MCA was doing. At the entrance to the store I ran into a young couple who had written one of the songs on the album. They were anxious to buy a copy. It took the three of us, searching independently, 15 minutes to find one. There were no store displays of any kind. It was not filed under New Releases. It was not to be found under my name in the pop female vocal section or any other category. My new album was finally located in the back of the store in a bin marked Nostalgia and filed under the letter R. It had been successfully "buried."

Reddy on the cover of the 16 May 1983 issue of People

The fact that Reddy was divorcing Jeff Wald, who had also been her manager since the late 1960s, and that they were in a custody dispute over their 10-year-old son became of greater interest to entertainment reporters. "In preparation for the release of the album, my publicist had arranged for an article in People magazine. I had gone to their photographer's studio to have pictures taken to accompany the story." Later when she flew to New York for what was to be a promotional appearance on Good Morning America, the news of the divorce got out. "While I was in the air, the latest edition of People magazine was hitting the stands. I didn't know it yet, but the interview intended as publicity for the album was now a cover story, complete with a smiling picture of me, on 'Hollywood's Dirtiest Custody Case.'"

On the way from the airport to the studio for the Good Morning America interview she received a call from the show's talent coordinator. "I had already done the customary pre-interview over the phone from L.A.... I had told her I would be happy to discuss anything except the custody case because a gag order had been placed on those concerned. If I were to discuss the subject in any way, I would be in contempt of court." Nevertheless, GMA was insistent on taking advantage of the opportunity to discuss the split. "The talent coordinator informed me that there was no point in my coming on the show if I wasn't going to talk about the custody battle because 'our viewers don't care about your music. They just want to hear about your personal life.'" Reddy had the driver turned around and take her back to the airport. "I needed to find another way to earn a living. I couldn't do this anymore." She wouldn't record another album for seven years.

== Singles ==
The release of "Don't Tell Me Tonight" as a single coincided with a performance of the song on Solid Gold, and Reddy also had a video made for the title track from the album, which also came out in the 7-inch format. "My daughter, Traci, was about to graduate from USC Film School... and with music videos now the rage, I had asked her if she had any ideas for a new album. She certainly did. With the help of her classmates and a loan from the bank, she made a most imaginative film out of the song 'Imagination' for only $15,000." Neither song made it onto Billboard's Hot 100 or Adult Contemporary charts.

Ironically, the reason that Reddy left Capitol Records for MCA was that she didn't feel that she was being supported by them during the last few years that she recorded there. But each of her MCA albums had at least one song that the label neglected to recognize for its hit potential that was later popularized by someone else. On Play Me Out it was "Save Me", which Louise Mandrell took to number six on the Country chart two years after Reddy's version came out. On this album it was "Let’s Go Up", which peaked at number 77 on the Hot 100 in 1984 for Diana Ross, and "Heartbeat", a cover of a song by Wendy Waldman that became Don Johnson's debut single and reached number five pop and number 26 on Billboard's Album Rock Tracks chart in 1986.

== Reception ==
Cashbox gave the album a positive review at the time of its release, commenting that "while there are some moments when Reddy does get a little hard-edged and gutsy...this is a package geared primarily towards Reddy’s AC fans" and that the horn and string arrangements enhanced her "self-confident vocals"; the songs "Handsome Dudes" and "Yesterday Can't Hurt Me" were recommended to radio stations that programmed "mellow pop".

AllMusic's Joe Viglione had extensive retrospective praise for the album. "The Dane Jeffries title track might as well be The Go-Go's or Missing Persons; it's a really great new wave pop tune, served up on a vinyl 12-inch with an extended dance remix for good measure." He emphasized that this update in her sound has expanded the singer artistically: "Side two is more of this new-styled radio pop, and both 'Looks Like Love' and 'The Way I Feel' are among the best work Helen Reddy has ever created. Both songs should have been huge hits, and the entire album is more sophisticated in idea and execution than any that came before except, perhaps, Live in London." On her recording of what became Don Johnson's hit "Heartbeat" he wrote, "It's another snappy, moving, modern-sounding delight," and concluded, "With superb songwriting, crisp production, and her best rock performance on record, Imagination is one of Helen Reddy's finest albums. Not as popular as those which contained her chart hits, Imagination is worth seeking out. It's a sleeper that deserves another shot at success."

== Track listing ==
Side 1

1. "Handsome Dudes" (Barry Mann, Cynthia Weil) – 4:22
  - Ricky Lawson – drums
  - Nathan East – bass and synth bass
  - Martin Walsh – guitar
  - Paul Jackson Jr. – guitar
  - Robbie Buchanan – piano and synthesizers
2. "Don't Tell Me Tonight" (Antonina Armato, Gary Benson, Frank Wildhorn) – 3:07
  - David L. Kemper – drums
  - Neil Stubenhaus – bass
  - Robbie Buchanan – GSI keyboard, Yamaha and acoustic piano
  - Martin Walsh – guitar
  - Lori B. Williams – alto sax solo, background vocals
3. "A Winner in Your Eyes" (Randy Goodrum, Candy Parton) – 3:24
  - Vinnie Colaiuta – drums
  - Nathan East – bass
  - Martin Walsh – guitar
  - Robbie Buchanan – piano
  - Kenny Watson – vibes
4. "Let's Go Up" (Franne Golde, Peter Ivers) – 3:56
  - Vinnie Colaiuta – drums
  - Nathan East – bass
  - Martin Walsh – guitar
  - Robbie Buchanan – piano
  - Arnold McCuller – background vocals
  - David Lasley – background vocals
  - Michael McDonald – background vocals
5. "Imagination" (Dane Jeffries) – 4:12
  - Robbie Buchanan – keyboard and synthesizers
  - Paulinho da Costa – timbales
  - Richard Walley – didgeridoo
  - Robert Greenidge – steel drums
  - Helen Reddy – background vocals

Side 2

1. "Looks Like Love" (Keith Stegall) – 2:50
  - Ricky Lawson – drums
  - Nathan East – bass and synth bass
  - Martin Walsh – guitar
  - Paul Jackson Jr. – guitar
  - Robbie Buchanan – piano and synthesizers
  - Helen Reddy – background vocals
2. "The Way I Feel" (Eric Kaz, Wendy Waldman) – 3:23
  - John Robinson – drums
  - Neil Stubenhaus – bass
  - Robbie Buchanan – GSI keyboard, Yamaha and Fender Rhodes
  - Martin Walsh – guitar
3. "Guess You Had to Be There" (Barbara Ann Suber) – 3:40
  - Ricky Lawson – drums
  - Nathan East – bass and synth bass
  - Martin Walsh – guitar
  - Paul Jackson Jr. – guitar
  - Robbie Buchanan – Wurlitzer electric piano and acoustic piano
  - Kenny Watson – vibes
4. "Yesterday Can't Hurt Me" (Dennis Lambert, Brian Potter) – 3:07
  - John Robinson – drums
  - Nathan East – bass
  - Martin Walsh – guitar
  - Robbie Buchanan – keyboards
5. "Heartbeat" (Eric Kaz, Wendy Waldman) – 3:21
  - David L. Kemper – drums
  - Neil Stubenhaus – bass
  - Robbie Buchanan –acoustic piano
  - Martin Walsh – guitar

== Personnel ==
- Helen Reddy – vocals; background vocals
- Joe Wissert – producer
- Nick DeCaro – arranger and conductor
- Larry Williams – horn arranger ("Handsome Dudes", "Let's Go Up")
- Tom Perry – recording engineer; mixing engineer
- Ross Pallone – recording engineer; assistant mixing engineer
- Mike Reese – disc mastering
- Frank DeCaro – contractor
- Michael Gardner Co. – management
- George Hurrell – photography
- Vartan – art direction
- Taki Ono – graphics
- Arnold McCuller – background vocals
- Charlotte Crossley – background vocals
- Carmen Grillo – background vocals
- Jo Ann Harris – background vocals
- David Lasley – background vocals
- Michael McDonald – background vocals
- Lori B. Williams – background vocals
- Larry Williams – horn
- Jerry Hey – horn
- Bill Reichenbach Jr. – horn
- Kim Hutchcroft – horn
- Gary Grant – horn
- Lori B. Williams – horn
- Harry Bluestone – concertmaster and violin
- Sheldon Sanov – violin
- Reginald Hill – violin
- Marvin Limonick – violin
- Stanley Plummer – violin
- Sid Page – violin
- William Hymanson – violin
- Henry Ferber – violin
- Ronald Folsom – violin
- Vicki Sylvester – violin
- Denyse Buffum – viola
- Dan Neufeld – viola
- Armand Kaproff– cello
- Paula Hochhalter – cello

- Recorded at Hollywood Sound Studios, Los Angeles, California
