= Save Me (Clodagh Rodgers song) =

Single by Louise Mandrell

from the album Close Up
- B-side: "Trust Me"
- Released: February 26, 1983
- Genre: Country
- Length: 3:21
- Label: RCA
- Songwriter(s): R.C. Bannon, Doug Flett, Guy Fletcher
- Producer(s): Eddie Kilroy

Louise Mandrell singles chronology
"Romance" (1982)	"Save Me" (1983)	"Too Hot to Sleep" (1983)

"Save Me" is a country-influenced pop song written by Guy Fletcher and Doug Flett. It was originally recorded in 1976 by Northern Irish singer Clodagh Rodgers, for her album of the same title, and released as a single. The song's narrator describes feeling bored and out of place at a party, and slipping out with the only man she is attracted to.

Rodgers's recording was featured on Top of the Pops on 6 January 1977, unusually for the show, prior to charting, with the evident expectation of doing so. However, UK chart success eluded this version, although it did chart at number 21 in Capital Radio's Top 30 London chart.

Also two versions released in the US the following year appeared in Billboard magazine. A recording of the song by Merrilee Rush debuted on the magazine's Hot 100 in the issue dated June 11, 1977, and reached number 54 during its seven weeks there. Her version also had a two-week run to number 49 on the magazine's Easy Listening chart that began the following month, in the issue dated July 2. That same issue also marked the first appearance of a recording of the song by Donna McDaniel that made it to number 90 pop over the course of five weeks.

In 1977 in Sweden Brian Chapman's version of "Save Me" entered the charts at number 12 and reached a high of number 5 on the Swedish Charts in February 1978, and held a number 5 position for a total of 2 weeks, making his version of the song, the highest-charting hit version to date. The song remained in the Swedish charts for a total of 10 weeks.

The same year, Petula Clark released a French-language version Sauve-moi with unrelated lyrics written by Didier Barbelivien. This version charted at 19 in France and number one in the Canadian province of Quebec.

In 1979 the South African group Clout reached the top ten with the song in South Africa and other countries. And in 1981 Australian-American Helen Reddy recorded it for her album Play Me Out.

"Save Me" was covered again in 1983 by American country music artist Louise Mandrell. It was released in February as the second single from her album Close Up, and Mandrell's then-husband, R.C. Bannon, is credited as a co-writer for rewriting the verses on her version. The song reached number six on Billboard's Hot Country Singles chart and was also her first Billboard top 10 single.

== Chart performance ==
Chart (1983)	Peak position
US Hot Country Songs (Billboard)	6
Canadian RPM Country Tracks	2
