= The Essential (Don Johnson album) =

Greatest hits album by Don Johnson
- Released: January 20, 1997
- Genre: Rock
- Label: Sony
- Producer: Keith Diamond, Chas Sandford

Don Johnson chronology
Let It Roll (1989)	The Essential (1997)

The Essential is the sole greatest hits album by Don Johnson, released in 1997 on the Sony Music Media Record Label.

== Track listing ==
1. "Tell It Like It Is"
2. "Voice on a Hotline"
3. "Heartbeat"
4. "Other People's Lives"
5. "Heartache Away"
6. "What If It Takes All Night"
7. "Can't Take Your Memory"
8. "Angel City"
9. "Star Tonight"
10. "Lost in Your Eyes"
11. "Coco Don't"
12. "Gotta Get Away"
13. "Your Love Is Safe with Me"
14. "Lonely Too Long"
15. "Last Sound Love Makes"
16. "A Better Place" (duet with Yuri)
