= Maybe My Baby =

Single by Louise Mandrell

from the album Maybe My Baby
- B-side: "Are You Just Playing With Me"
- Released: March 30, 1985
- Genre: Country
- Length: 2:58
- Label: RCA
- Songwriter: Eric Carmen
- Producer: R.C. Bannon

Louise Mandrell singles chronology
"This Bed's Not Big Enough" (1985)	"Maybe My Baby" (1985)	"I Wanna Say Yes" (1985)

"Maybe My Baby" is a song written by Eric Carmen, included on his 1984 LP, Eric Carmen. The song was later recorded by American country music artist Louise Mandrell. It was released in March 1985 as the first single and title track from the album Maybe My Baby. The song reached number 8 on the Billboard Hot Country Singles & Tracks chart.

== Chart performance ==
Chart (1985)	Peak position
US Hot Country Songs (Billboard)	8
Canadian RPM Country Tracks	23
