= Barbara Mandrell & the Mandrell Sisters =

U.S. variety television show (1980–82)

- Genre: Variety
- Directed by: Bob Henry; Jack Regas
- Starring: Barbara Mandrell; Irlene Mandrell; Louise Mandrell
- Country of origin: United States
- Original language: English
- No. of seasons: 2
- No. of episodes: 36

Production
- Producers: Ernest Chambers; Sid and Marty Krofft; Donald Loughery; David J. Nash; Frank Peppiatt

Original release
- Network: NBC
- Release: November 18, 1980 – June 26, 1982

Barbara Mandrell & the Mandrell Sisters is an American variety show starring American country artist Barbara Mandrell, along with her sisters Irlene Mandrell and Louise Mandrell. The show ran for two seasons on the NBC network between November 1980 and June 1982. The program mixed both music and comedy sketches. The siblings often engaged in sketches involving their family relationship. The music of the show featured the sisters singing and playing a variety of musical instruments. Guest performers were also a part of every show. The show ended its run after Barbara Mandrell decided to step away due to the constant workload.

== Background ==
Barbara Mandrell was considered by writers to be one of country music's most successful music artists during the late 1970s and early 1980s. She had a series of number one and top ten country singles, a handful of which crossed over to the pop charts. During this period, Mandrell also became known for her high production concert shows that often included costume changes and choreography. Her performance style attracted the attention of NBC producer Marty Krofft, who offered Mandrell her own television show. She originally turned down his offer. "My father was in agreement with me, I would never do a network television show. We thought that was sudden death to a recording artist," she later told The Tennessean. However, she ultimately accepted the role after multiple offers.

== Format ==
The program was hosted by Barbara Mandrell, along with her younger sisters Irlene and Louise. It was co-produced by Sid and Marty Krofft, along with Ernest Chambers and Frank Peppiatt. It was directed by Bob Henry and Jack Regas. Music for the variety show was arranged by the Dennis McCarthy Orchestra and Mandrell's touring band The Do Rites. It ran on the NBC network weekly for a total of 60 minutes for two seasons. A total of 36 episodes were aired. The show was taped at the Sunset Gower Studios in Los Angeles, California. The show originally aired on Tuesday nights on the NBC network but was adjusted to Saturday nights until February 1982. That year, the show was moved back to the network's Tuesday night lineup before being moved back to Saturday nights for the final two months of its run.

Barbara Mandrell & the Mandrell Sisters mixed both music and comedy sketches. The comedy sketches were often built around the relationship of the Mandrell sisters. The siblings were described as "engaging in a certain amount of tongue-in-cheek sibling rivalry", according to writers Tim Brooks and Earle Marsh, who also observed that Barbara was portrayed as the "serious, pushy sister", while Irlene was portrayed as "the sexy, vain one". The show also centered around music.

The program often showcased the sisters' musician skills on multiple instruments. Barbara was often seen playing the banjo, steel guitar, piano and saxophone. Sister Louise was shown playing the banjo and fiddle. Irlene was routinely featured playing the drums. The show also included guests performers that ranged in style and genre. Among their featured guests were Ray Charles, Bob Hope, and Glen Campbell. The program often ended with a traditional medley of gospel music.

== Cancellation ==
Although the show was planning to continue on the network, Barbara Mandrell chose to leave the program after only two seasons. The demand of keeping both a singing and television career drove her towards exhaustion. "The one and only reason I will not is because I was under severe strain in my throat ... The hours -- some days 14 and some days 16 -- were unbelievable," she explained in 1982. The strain of Mandrell's voice prompted her to take cortisone shots so she could tape the program. Doctors convinced her to quit, stating that it would cause permanent vocal damage. At the time of the show's cancellation, the program was said to have attracted 40 million viewers.

In 2007, the show was offered in a DVD format and was sold under the title Best of Barbara Mandrell and the Mandrell Sisters Show.

== Nielsen ratings/broadcast schedule ==
Season	Time slot (ET)	Rank	Rating
1 (1980–81)	Tuesday at 10:00–11:00 PM (November 1980); Saturday 8:00–9:00 PM (November 1980–January 1982)	Not in top 30	NA
2 (1981–82)	Saturday 8:00–9:00 PM (November 1980–January 1982); Saturday 9:00–10:00 PM (January–February 1982); Tuesday 10:00–11:00 PM (January–February 1982); Saturday 9:00–10:00 PM (April–June 1982)	Not in top 30	NA

== Guest stars ==
Guest stars are adapted from the credits of the DVD the Best of Barbara & the Mandrell Sisters.

- Alabama
- Hoyt Axton
- Paul Anka
- R.C. Bannon
- Glen Campbell
- June Carter Cash
- Johnny Cash
- Ray Charles
- Gail Davies
- Phyllis Diller
- Tennessee Ernie Ford
- Dale Evans
- Andy Gibb
- Terri Gibbs
- Bobby Goldsboro
- Bob Hope
- Tom Jones
- Gladys Knight & the Pips
- Brenda Lee
- The Oak Ridge Boys
- Donny Osmond
- Dolly Parton
- Minnie Pearl
- Charley Pride
- Debbie Reynolds
- Marty Robbins
- Kenny Rogers
- Roy Rogers
- Jim Stafford
- Sha-Na-Na
- Ray Stevens
- John Schneider
- The Statler Brothers
- Sylvia
- Fran Tarkenton
- Mel Tillis
- B.J. Thomas
- Conway Twitty
- Bobby Vinton
- Dottie West
- Andy Williams
