= Too Hot to Sleep (song) =

Single by Louise Mandrell

from the album Too Hot to Sleep
- B-side: "We Put on Quite a Show"
- Released: July 16, 1983
- Genre: Country
- Length: 3:36
- Label: RCA
- Songwriter(s): R.C. Bannon, John Bettis
- Producer(s): Eddie Kilroy

Louise Mandrell singles chronology
"Save Me" (1983)	"Too Hot to Sleep" (1983)	"Runaway Heart" (1983)

"Too Hot to Sleep" is a song written by R.C. Bannon and John Bettis, and recorded by American country music artist Louise Mandrell. It was released in July 1983 as the first single and title track from the album Too Hot to Sleep. The song reached number 10 on the Billboard Hot Country Singles & Tracks chart.

== Chart performance ==
Chart (1983)	Peak position
US Hot Country Songs (Billboard)	10
Canadian RPM Country Tracks	26
