= I Wanna Say Yes =

Single by Louise Mandrell

from the album Maybe My Baby
- B-side: "There'll Never Be Another for Me"
- Released: August 17, 1985
- Genre: Country
- Length: 3:23
- Label: RCA
- Songwriter(s): R.C. Bannon
- Producer(s): R.C. Bannon

Louise Mandrell singles chronology
"Maybe My Baby" (1985)	"I Wanna Say Yes" (1985)	"Some Girls Have All the Luck" (1986)

"I Wanna Say Yes" is a song written by R.C. Bannon, and recorded by American country music artist Louise Mandrell. It was released in August 1985 as the second single from the album Maybe My Baby. The song was the highest-charting single of Mandrell's career, reaching number 5 on Billboard Hot Country Singles & Tracks.

== Chart performance ==
Chart (1985)	Peak position
US Hot Country Songs (Billboard)	5
Canadian RPM Country Tracks	3
