= Come Back and Shake Me =

Single by Clodagh Rodgers
- B-side: "I Am a Fantasy"
- Released: 1969
- Genre: Pop
- Length: 2:28
- Label: RCA Victor
- Songwriter: Kenny Young
- Producer: Kenny Young

Clodagh Rodgers singles chronology
"Come Back and Shake Me" (1969)	"Goodnight Midnight" (1969)

"Come Back and Shake Me" is a song and single written and produced by Kenny Young, performed by Clodagh Rodgers and released in 1969.

Of Rodgers' six hit singles in the UK, this was her first and biggest hit. It reached No. 3 on the UK Singles Charts in 1969 staying in the charts for 14 weeks. It was a bigger hit in Ireland, reaching No. 2 on the Irish Charts. It peaked at No. 13 on the Australian KMR Chart, entering the chart in June 1969, and spent 13 weeks in the Australian Top-100.

== Origin ==
Rodgers' previous two singles for RCA Records had not charted. In 1968, she was seen by songwriter Kenny Young when she appeared with Honeybus on the TV programme Colour Me Pop. Young met Rodgers and her husband and manager, Johnny Morris, and agreed to write and produce for her; "Come Back and Shake Me" was their first collaboration.

== Charts ==
Chart (1969)	Peak position
Ireland (IRMA)	2
New Zealand (Listener)	10
UK Singles (OCC)	3
West Germany (GfK)	39
