= Play Me Out (Helen Reddy album) =

Studio album by Helen Reddy
- Released: 1981
- Recorded: 1981
- Studios: Devonshire Sound Studios, Los Angeles, California
- Length: 33:33
- Label: MCA
- Producer: Joel Diamond

Helen Reddy chronology
Take What You Find (1980)	Play Me Out (1981)	Imagination (1983)

Professional ratings
Review scores
Source	Rating
People	negative

Play Me Out is the thirteenth studio album by Australian-American pop singer Helen Reddy that was released in 1981 by MCA Records. Having recorded 12 studio albums at Capitol Records over a 10-year period, she felt the move was "'long overdue... For the last three years I didn't feel I was getting the support from them.'" Whatever support she received from the new label was not enough to get the album onto Billboard magazine's Top LPs & Tape chart.

== Single ==
The album includes the song that was her last to reach Billboard's Hot 100 and Adult Contemporary charts. "I Can't Say Goodbye to You" made its pop chart debut in the issue of the magazine dated May 23, 1981, and peaked at number 88 during its three weeks there. That same issue also marked its first appearance on the Adult Contemporary chart, where it spent four weeks and got as high as number 42. It also reached number 43 on the UK singles chart.

The album's producer, Joel Diamond, had helmed a recording of "Save Me" by Donna McDaniel in 1977 that got as high as number 90 on the Hot 100, but MCA did not release Reddy's cover from this album as a single. Country artist Louise Mandrell did, however, have a number six Country hit with it two years after the release of this album, in 1983.

== Track listing ==
Side 1

1. "Optimism Blues" (Allen Toussaint) – 3:10
2. "Do It Like You Done It When You Meant It" (Howard Greenfield, Neil Sedaka) – 3:28
3. "I Can't Say Goodbye to You" (Becky Hobbs) – 3:46
4. "Save Me" (Guy Fletcher, Doug Flett) – 3:10
5. "You Don't Have To Say You Love Me" (Pino Donaggio, Simon Napier-Bell, Vicki Wickham) – 2:43

Side 2

1. "The Stars Fell on California" (Johnny Bristol) – 3:54
2. "I Don't Know Why (I Love That Guy)" (Becky Hobbs) – 2:35
3. "When I Dream" (Sandy Mason) – 3:54
4. "Let's Just Stay Home Tonight" (Lotti Golden, Richard Scher) – 3:09
5. "Play Me Out" (Lesley Gore, Carol Hall) – 3:07

== Personnel ==
- Helen Reddy – vocals
- Joel Diamond – producer; rhythm track arranger; arranger and conductor for strings, horns and background vocals ("Play Me Out")
- Artie Butler – arranger and conductor for strings, horns and background vocals ("I Can't Say Goodbye to You", "Save Me")
- Charles Calello – arranger and conductor for strings, horns and background vocals ("Optimism Blues", "You Don’t Have to Say You Love Me", "I Don't Know Why (I Love That Guy)", "Let's Just Stay Home Tonight")
- Gene Page – arranger and conductor for strings, horns and background vocals ("Do It Like You Done It When You Meant It", "The Stars Fell on California", "When I Dream")
- Bill Halverson – recording engineer
- Russell Schmitt – assistant engineer
- Doug Kirkland – photography
- George Osaki – art direction
- Michael Kevin Lee – graphics
- Jeff Wald – management
- Denise Maynelli – background vocals
- Marti McCall – background vocals
- Myrna Matthews – background vocals
- Julia Waters Tillman – background vocals
- Maxine Waters Willard – background vocals
- Clydene Jackson – background vocals
- Oren Waters – background vocals
- Luther Waters – background vocals

Rhythm Players

- John Guerin – drums
- Gary Coleman – percussion
- Robben Ford – guitar
- Thom Rotella – guitar
- Waddy Wachtel – guitar
- Timothy May – guitar
- Larry Klein – bass
- John Barnes – keyboards
- Ron Fever – keyboards
- Eddie "Bongo" Brown – congas and bongos
- Jim Horn – sax solo ("Let's Just Stay Home Tonight")
- Ernie Watts – sax solo ("The Stars Fell on California")
- Rick Baptist – trumpet solo ("Play Me Out")
- Helen Reddy and Rhythm Section – tambourine and hand claps ("Play Me Out")

- recorded at Devonshire Sound Studios, Los Angeles, California
