= Let It Roll (Don Johnson album) =

Studio album by Don Johnson
- Released: September 20, 1989
- Studio: Right Track (New York City); Soundtrack (New York City); Unique (New York City); Skyline (New York City); Lion Share (Los Angeles); Cherokee (Los Angeles); New River (Fort Lauderdale); Audio Vision Recording (Miami)
- Genre: Rock
- Length: 44:10
- Label: Epic
- Producer: Keith Diamond

Don Johnson chronology
Heartbeat (1986)	Let It Roll (1989)	The Essential (1997)

Professional ratings
Review scores
Source	Rating
AllMusic	2.5/5 stars

Let It Roll is the second (and to date final) studio album by American actor and singer Don Johnson, released on September 20, 1989, by Epic Records. Barbra Streisand contributed background vocals to "What If It Takes All Night". It also includes Johnson's rendition of "Tell It Like It Is".

== Track listing ==
No.	Title	Writer(s)	Length
1.	"Other People's Lives"	Diane Warren	5:25
2.	"Tell It Like It Is"	Lee Diamond; George Davis	4:30
3.	"Your Love Is Safe with Me"	Scott Cutler; Dennis Morgan	4:22
4.	"A Better Place" (duet with Yuri)	John Capek; Marc Jordan; Amy Sky	5:25
5.	"When You Only Loved Me"	Jeff Daniels; Harold Allen	3:55
6.	"Angel City"	Don Johnson; Keith Diamond; Michael Des Barres; Dave Resnik	4:22
7.	"Lonely Too Long"	Marty Robbins	4:20
8.	"Let It Roll"	Johnson; Diamond	4:21
9.	"What If It Takes All Night"	Clyde Lieberman; Jeff Pescetto; Richard James Burgess	4:06
10.	"Little One's Lullaby"	Johnson; Diamond	3:24

== Personnel ==
Credits adapted from the liner notes of Let It Roll.

=== Musicians ===
- Don Johnson – lead vocals (all tracks); background vocals (tracks 1, 4, 6); guitars (track 10)
- Omar Hakim – drums (tracks 1, 9)
- Paul Pesco – bass (track 1); guitars (tracks 2–4, 7–10); guitar solo (track 3); acoustic guitar solo (track 9)
- Ira Siegel – guitars (tracks 1–3, 6, 7); guitar solo (track 1)
- Keith Diamond – keyboards (tracks 1, 3–10); bass (tracks 2, 4, 6, 8); Hammond B3 organ, acoustic piano (track 2); keyboard solo (track 5); Fairlight, fingersnaps, percussion (track 9); arrangements (tracks 1–3, 5–8, 10)
- Joe Lynn Turner – background vocals (track 1)
- Michael Camacho – background vocals (track 1)
- Curtis King – background vocals (track 1)
- Tracy Amos – background vocals (tracks 1, 6)
- Kennan Keating – additional guitars (track 1)
- Terry Silverlight – drums (tracks 2, 4, 8)
- Danny Wilensky – sax, horn solo, horn arrangements (track 2); solo saxes, horn arrangements (track 6)
- Chris Botti – trumpet (track 2); solo trumpet (track 6)
- Mike Davis – trombone (track 2)
- B.J. Nelson – background vocals (track 2)
- Janice Dempsey – background vocals (tracks 2, 6–9)
- Cindy Mizelle – background vocals (tracks 2, 8)
- Audrey Wheeler – background vocals (tracks 2, 9)
- John Keane – drums (tracks 3, 6, 7)
- John Pierce – bass (track 3)
- Dave Resnik – guitars (tracks 3, 6, 7)
- Bruce Kulick – guitars, additional solo guitars (track 3)
- Steve Jones – guitars (tracks 3, 6, 7)
- Ron Schwartz – keyboards (tracks 3, 6, 7)
- Liz Constantine – background vocals (track 3)
- N'Dea – background vocals (track 3)
- Laura Creamer – background vocals (track 3)
- Jill Dell'Abate – background vocals (tracks 3, 9)
- Yogi Lee – background vocals (tracks 3, 6, 9)
- Chrissy Faith – background vocals (tracks 3, 6, 7)
- EBN – Fairlight (tracks 4, 9)
- Yuri – featured vocals, background vocals (track 4)
- Jeff Daniels – guitars (track 5)
- Acar Key – cymbals (track 5)
- Leon Pendarvis – horn arrangements (tracks 5, 9); string arrangements, string and horn conducting
- Carl James – bass (tracks 6, 7)
- Bashiri Johnson – percussion (track 6)
- Kent Smith – trumpet (track 6)
- Rock Wilk – background vocals (track 6)
- Lauren Kinhan – background vocals (tracks 7, 8)
- Larry Russell – bass (track 8)
- Louis Merlino – background vocals (track 8)
- Wayne Brathwaite – bass (track 9)
- Mike Jewel – keyboards (track 9)
- Barbra Streisand – background vocals (track 9)
- Debbe Cole – background vocals (track 9)
- Jesse Levy, Frederick Zlotkin, Eugene Moya, Lewis Eley, Julien C. Barber, Harold Coletta, Alfred V. Brown, Jesse L. Levine, Harry Lookofsky, Charles Libove, Regis Iandiorio, Gerald Tarack, Max Ellen – strings
- George Young, Alex Foster, Joseph J. Shepley, Jeffrey Kievit – horns

=== Technical ===
- Keith Diamond – production
- Acar Key – engineering
- Eddie Garcia, Bob Ross, Peter Robbins – additional engineering
- Debbie Cornish, George Karras, Laura Livingston, John McGlain – engineering assistance

=== Artwork ===
- Nancy Donald – art direction
- David Coleman – art direction
- Randee St. Nicholas – photography

== Charts ==
=== Weekly charts ===
Weekly chart performance for Let It Roll
Chart (1989)	Peak position
Austrian Albums (Ö3 Austria)	23
Dutch Albums (Album Top 100)	19
European Albums (Music & Media)	11
Finnish Albums (Suomen virallinen lista)	17
German Albums (Offizielle Top 100)	2
Swedish Albums (Sverigetopplistan)	35
Swiss Albums (Schweizer Hitparade)	6

=== Year-end charts ===
Year-end chart performance for Let It Roll
Chart (1989)	Position
European Albums (Music & Media)	64
German Albums (Offizielle Top 100)	32

== Certifications ==
Certifications for Let It Roll
Region	Certification	Certified units/sales
Germany (BVMI)	Gold	250,000^{^}
Switzerland (IFPI Switzerland)	Gold	25,000^{^}
^{^} Shipments figures based on certification alone.
