= Heartbeat (Wendy Waldman song) =

1982 single by Wendy Waldman

Single by Wendy Waldman

from the album Which Way to Main Street
- Released: 1982
- Genre: Rock
- Length: 3:30
- Label: Epic
- Songwriters: Eric Kaz; Wendy Waldman
- Producer: Eddie Kramer

Wendy Waldman singles chronology
"Does Anybody Want to Marry Me" (1982)	"Heartbeat" (1982)	"Living in Hard Times" (1987)

"Heartbeat" is a 1982 song written by Eric Kaz and Wendy Waldman. It was first recorded by Waldman and released on her 1982 album Which Way to Main Street. That same year, Australian-American singer Helen Reddy recorded the song for her 1983 album Imagination, the song failed to chart.

The most famous rendition of the song is a 1986 cover of the song by Don Johnson, which was released as a single and included on Johnson's album Heartbeat. Johnson's cover became an international hit, peaking at number five on the Billboard Hot 100, and charting highly in many European countries. The song's popularity led to Johnson being named "the best new vocalist of 1986" in a Rolling Stone readers poll, and he released a music video interpreting the song, filmed with actress Lori Singer.

== Helen Reddy version ==
"Heartbeat"

Song by Helen Reddy

from the album Imagination
- Released: February 1983
- Recorded: 1982
- Studio: Hollywood Sound Recorders Inc., Hollywood, California
- Genre: Pop rock
- Label: MCA
- Songwriters: Eric Kaz, Wendy Waldman
- Producer: Joe Wissert

In 1982, Australian-American singer Helen Reddy, who also has performed other songs from Kaz and Waldman covered the song for her 1983 studio album Imagination. It was recorded at Hollywood Sound Recorders Inc. in Hollywood, California, and was produced by Joe Wissert. This was also one of her final songs on MCA Records Despite Imagination and 1981's Play Me Out failed to chart.

=== Personnel ===
- David L. Kemper - drums
- Neil Stubenhas - bass
- Robbie Buchanan - acoustic piano
- Martin Welsh - guitar

== Don Johnson version ==
"Heartbeat"

Single by Don Johnson

from the album Heartbeat
- B-side: "Can't Take Your Memory"
- Released: August 19, 1986
- Recorded: 1985
- Genre: Pop rock
- Length: 4:18
- Label: Epic
- Songwriters: Eric Kaz; Wendy Waldman
- Producer: Chas Sandford

Don Johnson singles chronology
"Heartbeat" (1986)	"Heartache Away" (1986)

Music video
- "Heartbeat" on YouTube

In 1986, American actor and singer Don Johnson recorded the song and included it on his debut album of the same name, releasing it as his debut single. The rendition was produced by Chas Sandford. It was released as the album's lead single on August 19, 1986 by Epic Records. It is the most successful version of the song, as well as becoming an international hit, peaking at number five on the Billboard Hot 100, and charting highly in many European countries. A music video was released featuring actress Lori Singer interpreting the song.

=== Track listings ===
7" single

1. "Heartbeat" - 4:18
2. "Can't Take Your Memory" - 4:30

12" single

1. "Heartbeat" - 4:18
2. "Can't Take Your Memory" - 4:30
3. "Coco Don't" - 3:33

=== Weekly charts ===
Weekly chart performance for "Heartbeat"
Chart (1986–1987)	Peak position
Australia (Kent Music Report)	26
Austria (Ö3 Austria Top 40)	3
Belgium (Ultratop 50 Flanders)	5
Canada Top Singles (RPM)	10
Europe (European Hot 100 Singles)	46
Finland (Suomen virallinen lista)	4
Ireland (IRMA)	21
Netherlands (Dutch Top 40)	5
Netherlands (Single Top 100)	10
New Zealand (Recorded Music NZ)	13
Norway (VG-lista)	5
Sweden (Sverigetopplistan)	16
Switzerland (Schweizer Hitparade)	6
UK Singles (Official Charts)	46
US Billboard Hot 100	5
US Mainstream Rock (Billboard)	26
US Top 100 Singles (Cash Box)	4
West Germany (GfK)	6

=== Year-end charts ===
1986 year-end chart performance for "Heartbeat"
Chart (1986)	Position
Belgium (Ultratop 50 Flanders)	34
Canada Top Singles (RPM)	80
Netherlands (Dutch Top 40)	33
Netherlands (Single Top 100)	40
US Top 100 Singles (Cash Box)	53

1987 year-end chart performance for "Heartbeat"
Chart (1987)	Position
Austria (Ö3 Austria Top 40)	16
West Germany (Media Control)	39
