= I'm Not Through Loving You Yet (Louise Mandrell song) =

Single by Louise Mandrell

from the album I'm Not Through Loving You Yet
- B-side: "A New Girl in Town"
- Released: March 24, 1984
- Genre: Country
- Length: 2:55
- Label: RCA
- Songwriter(s): Holly Dunn, Tom Shapiro, Chris Waters
- Producer(s): Eddie Kilroy

Louise Mandrell singles chronology
| "Runaway Heart" (1983) | "I'm Not Through Loving You Yet" (1984) | "Goodbye Heartache" (1984) |

"I'm Not Through Loving You Yet" is a song written by Holly Dunn, Tom Shapiro and Chris Waters, and recorded by American country music artist Louise Mandrell. It was released in March 1984 as the first single and title track from the album I'm Not Through Loving You Yet. The song reached number 7 on the Billboard Hot Country Singles & Tracks chart.

== Chart performance ==
| Chart (1984) | Peak position |
|---|---|
| US Hot Country Songs (Billboard) | 7 |
| Canadian RPM Country Tracks | 8 |
