= Smoky Mountain Opry Theater =

Theater in Pigeon Forge, Tennessee, US

- Louise Mandrell Theater; The Miracle Theater

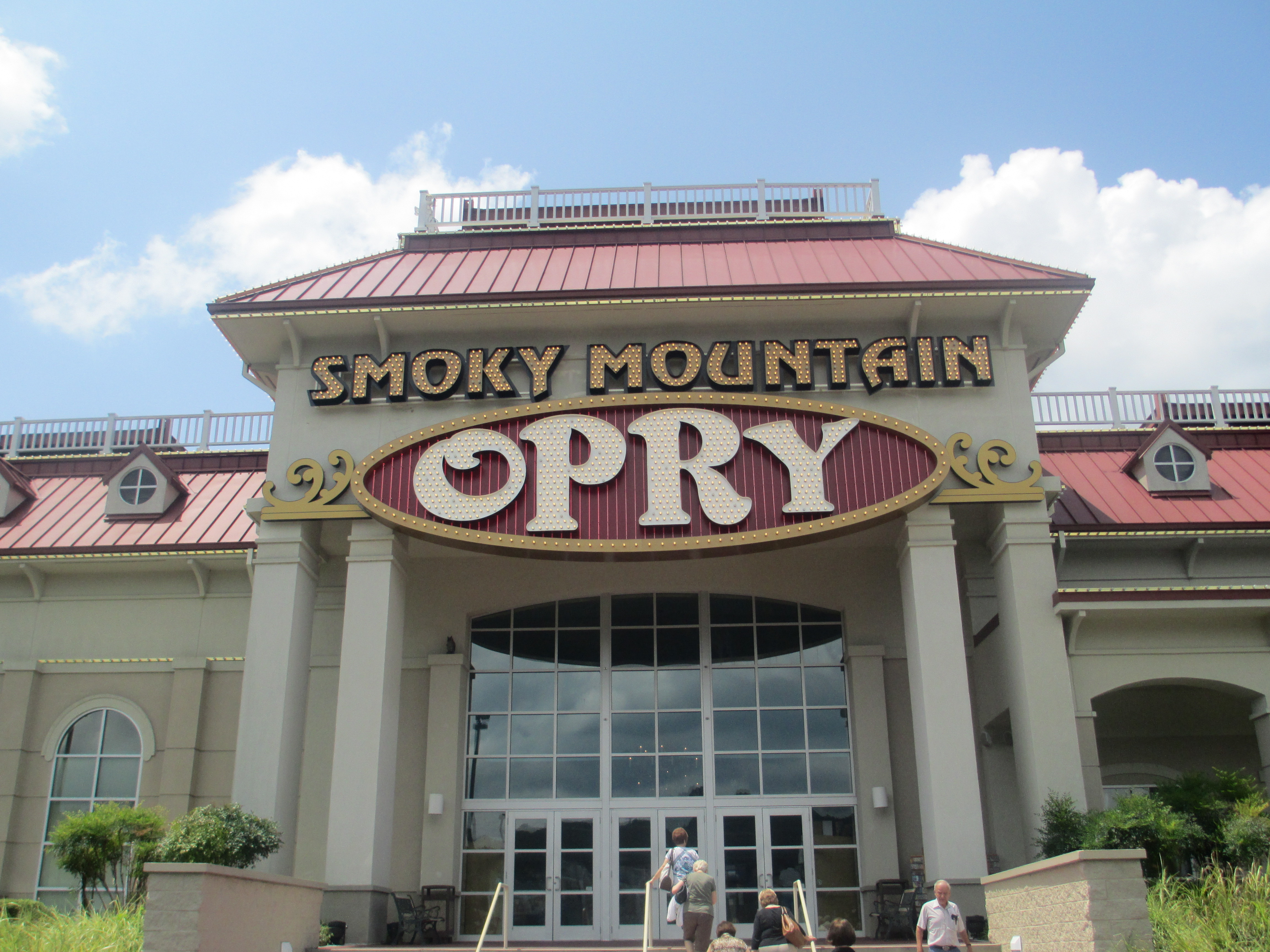
- Smoky Mountain Opry Theater in 2012
- Interactive map of Smoky Mountain Opry Theater
- Address: 2046 Parkway; Pigeon Forge, Tennessee; United States
- Coordinates: 35°49′28″N 83°34′43″W
- Owner: World Choice Investments, LLC
- Capacity: 1,400
- Type: Theater

Construction
- Opened: 1997
- Closed: May 2020

The Smoky Mountain Opry Theater (formerly known as The Miracle Theater and Louise Mandrell Theater) was a theater established in 1997 in Pigeon Forge, Tennessee, United States.

== History ==
In Fall 1997, the theater was opened as stage for country singer Louise Mandrell. In 2005, the theater was purchased by The Fee Hedrick Family Entertainment Group, while Mandrell performed her last show on New Year's Eve that same year. After a $15 million installation, the theater was reopened as "The Miracle Theater" on April 13, 2006. Its main play, "The Miracle" was performed from its opening in 2006 to its closing on October 22, 2011. The musical was about the life of Jesus Christ. The musical consisted of live animals, sword-fights, and wire-harnessing angels and was composed by David Legg and written by Linda Nell Cooper. Other shows that were performed at the Miracle Theater included the Andrew Lloyd Webber musical, Joseph and the Amazing Technicolor Dreamcoat. In September 2007, the Miracle Theater received national attention when it spent about $90,000 on a USA Today advertisement, which indirectly criticized Kathy Griffin's Primetime Emmy Award acceptance speech. On November 7, 2011, the theater re-opened as "Smoky Mountain Opry Theater" with a "Christmas at the Opry" show. A variety show was also added in the beginning of the 2012 season. At the end of 2018, World Choice Investments, the owner of Dolly Parton's Stampede, purchased Fee Hedrick Entertainment (and therefore the Smoky Mountain Opry) for an undisclosed amount.

In May 2020, spokesperson Pete Owens announced that the theater would be closed during the entire season due to the COVID-19 pandemic. Although intended to be a temporary closure, the theater was never reopened.

In August 2023, it was announced that The Crayola Experience and The Nerf Action Xperience would be replacing the venue, both attractions were originally expected to open by Fall 2024. In June 2026, nearly three years after the attraction's official announcements, the Nerf Action Xperience would be constructed - with Crayola being replaced with other Hasbro brands.
