= Clodagh Rodgers =

Northern Irish singer (1947–2025)

- Born: 5 March 1947; Warrenpoint, County Down, Northern Ireland
- Died: 18 April 2025 (aged 78) Cobham, Surrey, England
- Genres: Pop
- Occupation: Singer
- Years active: 1961–2015
- Labels: Decca, Columbia (EMI), RCA, Precision Records
- Spouse(s): John Morris (m. 1968; div. 1979) Ian Sorbie (m. 1987; died 1995)

Clodagh Rodgers (5 March 1947 – 18 April 2025) was a Northern Irish (Note: Sources referring to her as Northern Irish include:) singer, best known for her hit singles including "Come Back and Shake Me", "Goodnight Midnight" and "Jack in the Box" and albums including You Are My Music, It's Different Now and Save Me.

Rodgers was born in County Down in 1947 and started singing at the age of 13. She made her television debut in September 1962. She represented the United Kingdom at the Eurovision Song Contest 1971 with "Jack in the Box", and finished in fourth place. After the contest, the single reached #4 on the UK singles chart.

After her divorce in 1979, Rodgers stopped making new music and reduced her live appearances. She released two final singles in 1980 and her last overall release was a 2012 CD. Rodgers lived the last years of her life in Surrey in relative obscurity until her death in 2025.

== Early life ==
Rodgers was born in Warrenpoint and began her professional singing career at the age of 13, when she opened for Michael Holliday.

== Career ==
Her father, a dancehall tour promoter, helped her sign with Decca in 1962, where her earliest singles were produced by Shel Talmy. Her UK TV debut came on 26 September 1962, appearing as a guest on BBC TV's Adam Faith Show performing Let's Jump the Broomstick. She made four singles with Decca, before moving to EMI's Columbia label in 1965, where 'Cloda Rogers' made the 1966 single "Stormy Weather"/"Lonely Room". Although none of her Decca or Columbia singles made the UK Singles Chart, Rodgers became a regular face on British television and appeared in the musical films Just for Fun (1963) and It's All Over Town (1964). She also appeared in various song festivals, finishing third in the European Song Cup competition in Greece with "Powder Your Face With Sunshine". In November 1963, she flew to Nashville, Tennessee at the invitation of the American singer Jim Reeves, to perform at the Grand Ole Opry. On his Irish tour earlier that year, he had recognised that Rodgers was a promising artist with a bright future.

Rodgers appeared with Honeybus on BBC2's music programme Colour Me Pop on 12 October 1968. Her career changed dramatically when she married John Morris, who became her manager. She signed a three-single deal with RCA in 1968, but the first two failed to chart. When producer and songwriter Kenny Young saw her on Colour Me Pop he telephoned the BBC to find out who she was. Rodgers had chart success in 1969 under his creative wing and with Morris' management (Morris also later managed The Rubettes, Kenny and Fox), – "Come Back and Shake Me" was the first hit, reaching #3 (the song reached #2 in Ireland) and "Goodnight Midnight" followed later in the year reaching #4 – the two songs made her the best-selling female singles artist of 1969.

The same year, she won 'The Best Legs' in British showbusiness and insured her voice for one million pounds. Her next two single releases "Biljo" and "Everybody Go Home, The Party's Over" were both hits, "Biljo" being Rodgers third Top 20 hit.

She also recorded "Scrapbook", penned by Billy Ritchie, which appeared on her 1969 album Midnight Clodagh. In 1970, she recorded the Labi Siffre song "Give Me Just a Little More Line" with Young under the name Moonshine; though it achieved airplay and critical notice, it failed to chart. Rodgers picked this track as one of her eight favourite discs when she appeared as the featured castaway on the BBC's Desert Island Discs in March 1971.

In May 1970, Rodgers appeared on the bill at the NME poll-winner's concert, hosted by presenters, Tony Blackburn and Jimmy Savile. She was voted favourite female singer for 1969.

=== Eurovision ===
Rodgers became a television star and a household name and in 1970, she was asked to represent the United Kingdom in the Eurovision Song Contest 1971 to be celebrated in Dublin. The BBC were concerned over the reaction the UK entrant would get on the stage from the Irish public. As a Roman Catholic female from Northern Ireland, she received death threats from the IRA who regarded her as a traitor, as a result of her appearing for the UK.

Heralded by two separate front-cover features on the BBC listing's magazine, the Radio Times, Rodgers appeared as the resident guest on It's Cliff Richard, a prime-time variety show hosted by Cliff Richard on BBC1 from January 1971, performing one shortlisted song a week for six weeks, followed by a performance of all six on week seven and with a repeat of the six songs immediately after. Viewers would normally have been asked to send in postcard votes for their favourites, but because of a postal strike, regional juries decided the winner, with "Jack in the Box", written by John Worsley and David Myers, being named the winner the following week.

For the first time in the Eurovision Song Contest, broadcasters were required to prepare a 'preview' video of the song for broadcast in all the participating Eurovision countries to help promote the songs before the contest. For the performance in Dublin, Rodgers wore a pink frilly top and spangled hot pants. She finished in fourth place, behind Monaco, Spain and Germany.

After Eurovision, the single reached #4 on the UK Singles Chart, her third UK Top 10 success. It remains her most famous hit. The record was also successful all over Europe.

At Eurovision, Rodgers' sister Lavinia joined The Breakaways as her four backing vocalists. Lavinia was almost part of a backing group called Three’s a Crowd. In 1982, Lavinia and brother Louis attempted to represent the UK in the contest with "Every Day of My Life" as part of the group Good Looks, but finished second to Bardo in the A Song For Europe contest.

=== Post-Eurovision career ===
Rodgers admitted to Ken Bruce during his eponymous BBC Radio 2 show in an interview broadcast on Friday, 25 May 2012, that the intention had been to release "Another Time, Another Place", which had placed fourth of the six entries in the Song for Europe contest as the follow-up single to "Jack in the Box" and she began promoting it whilst in Dublin for the Eurovision final. However, Engelbert Humperdinck released a cover version before her track was available, denying her the opportunity to release it, but gaining himself a #13 hit single. Despite only one more Top 30 chart single, "Lady Love Bug" in autumn 1971, Rodgers continued to be a major TV star in the UK, guesting on many shows (including playing herself in the BBC sitcom Whack-O!), and appearing successfully in the biggest cabaret clubs throughout the country.

Rodgers also became the face of Bisto gravy, in a series of television advertisements.

On Irish television, The Clodagh Rodgers Show won an award at the Golden Rose TV festival in Montreux. She starred in many other shows, including Sunday Night at the London Palladium in 1974, singing three songs, including her latest single "Get It Together". Rodgers also appeared in Seaside Special for BBC Television in 1975 and The Morecambe and Wise Show in 1970. She was a regular guest of The Two Ronnies. In August 1973, Rodgers hosted the first edition of BBC2's Show Of The Week: The Young Generation Big Top, the forerunner of the later BBC1 series Seaside Special.

Rodgers also made a mark with her impressions of fellow artists such as Cilla Black, often working with Mike Yarwood, Des O'Connor, Tommy Cooper, Bob Monkhouse, and Dickie Henderson in variety. She was a regular performer in UK resorts' summer seasons, sharing the bill with Mike and Bernie Winters in Blackpool and Matt Monro in Great Yarmouth among others.

This success was mirrored on stage, where she starred in London's West End in her own show at the Talk of the Town (breaking Sammy Davis Jr.'s box office record), and in Cinderella at the London Palladium in 1971, which was also a success and ran for months. The Cinderella show (co starring Ronnie Corbett) then ran at the Manchester Palace in 1972 and at the Bristol Hippodrome in 1973.

As part of BBC1's celebration of the UK and Republic of Ireland both joining the European Economic Community on 1 January 1973, Rodgers appeared on Top Of The Year on 31 December 1972, alongside Bruce Forsyth and with Jimmy Tarbuck in The Tarbuck Follies on 1 January 1973 to see in the new year.

Having left RCA in early 1974 (after two well received albums It's Different Now and You are my Music, Rodgers then released a single for the Pye label, "Saturday Sunday" later that year. Numerous TV work supported all these three releases, including Top of the Pops and Pebble Mill At One.

She signed to Polydor Records in 1976. Her 1977 single "Save Me" was in Capital Radio's Top 30, reaching #21. The track was covered in the U.S. by Louise Mandrell, who took it to #6 on the U.S. country chart in 1983. "Save Me" was also covered by the South African all-female band Clout (an SA no. 7 hit in 1979). Other artists who recorded this song included Merrilee Rush and Helen Reddy.

In 1978, Rodgers hosted UK ITV's St. Patrick's Day variety show for the first time, appearing on the cover of the TVTimes to promote the show and at the same time was confirmed as the host for the 1979 show. Later in 1978, Rodgers teamed with Terry Wogan on the ITV game show 3-2-1 in the programme's first Christmas Special Celebrity edition.

She split from her manager/husband not long after their son's birth and opted for motherhood over a musical career; although she released two singles on the Precision label in 1980. One of these tracks was "My Simple Heart", which was placed on a B-side. Shortly after its release, The Three Degrees released their version of it, which reached the UK Top 10. Similarly, Rodgers had released "Stand by Your Man" as the B-side of her 1971 single "Lady Love Bug." "Stand by Your Man" (co-written by Tammy Wynette and Billy Sherrill) had previously been a hit for Tammy Wynette in the United States.

=== Later years ===
Rodgers appeared in two hit musicals in the West End, Pump Boys and Dinettes at the Piccadilly and Albery Theatres (co starring with Joe Brown) and in the lead role of Mrs Johnstone in the long-running hit Blood Brothers at the Phoenix Theatre. She appeared in the UK tour of Blood Brothers between 1995 and 1998. This included shows in York, Liverpool, Bromley and Bristol. Rodgers co-starred with David Cassidy in the Bristol production.

In 1996, the first of two CD retrospectives was issued, bringing Rodgers back into the limelight. In 1998, she made a TV appearance with other former Eurovision artists such as Johnny Logan and Lynsey de Paul, (one of her co stars in Pump Boys and Dinettes) performing on comedian John Shuttleworth's Eurovision parody Europigeon on BBC Two, just before the 1998 contest in Birmingham.

In 1999, Mint Royale issued the track "Shake Me," which sampled Rodgers' original recording of "Come Back And Shake Me"; it was featured on the British television programme Queer As Folk.

In 2001, Rodgers played a recurring character in the ITV police drama series The Bill.

In 2012, Rodgers released a CD The Kenny Young Years. It features all Rodgers' recorded highs with Young.

== Personal life, illness and death ==
Rodgers was married twice. Firstly she married John Morris in 1968, in London; he later became her manager. The marriage, which produced one son, ended in divorce in 1979. Her second husband, guitarist Ian Sorbie, whom she married in 1987 and with whom she had had a son in 1984, died of a brain tumour in 1995, not long after their Paignton-based restaurant business collapsed, leaving them bankrupt. Rodgers' sister Lavinia was also a singer.

Rodgers, who had been ill for around three years, died at her home in Cobham, Surrey, where she had lived for many years, on 18 April 2025, at the age of 78.

== Discography ==
=== Albums ===
- 1969 Clodagh Rodgers – (RCA SF8033) – UK Number 27
- 1969 Midnight Clodagh – (RCA SF8071)
- 1971 Rodgers and Heart – (RCA Victor SF8180)
- 1972 It's Different Now – (RCA SF8271)
- 1973 You Are My Music – (RCA SF8394)
- 1977 Save Me – (Polydor Super 2383473)

=== Compilations ===
- 1971 Clodagh Rodgers (Compilation) – (RCA Camden CDS1094)
- 1973 Come Back and Shake Me (Compilation) – (RCA International 1434)
- 1996 You Are My Music – The Best of Clodagh Rodgers (Compilation CD) – (BMG Camden BM830)
- 1997 The Masters (Compilation CD) – (Eagle EACD076)
- 2012 Come Back & Shake Me: The Kenny Young Years 1969–71 (Compilation CD) – (RPM B006TX26SG)

=== Singles ===
- 1962 "Believe Me I'm No Fool" / "End of the Line" (Decca F11534) [Produced by Shel Talmy]
- 1963 "Sometime Kind of Love" / "I See More of Him" (Decca F11607)
- 1963 "To Give My Love to You" / "I Only Live to Love You" (Decca F11667)
- 1964 "Mister Heartache" / "Time" (Decca F11812)
- 1965 "Wanting You" / "Johnny Come Home" (Columbia DB7468)
- 1966 "Every Day Is Just the Same" / "You'll Come a Running" (Columbia DB7926)
- 1966 "Stormy Weather" / "Lonely Room" (Columbia DB8038)
- 1968 "Room Full of Roses" / "Play the Drama to the End" (RCA 1684)
- 1968 "Rhythm of Love" / "River of Tears" (RCA 1748)
- 1969 "Come Back and Shake Me" / "I Am a Fantasy" (RCA 1792) – UK No.3/IRL No.2/GER No.39/AUS No.13
- 1969 "Goodnight Midnight" / "Together" (RCA 1852) UK No.4/IRL No.7
- 1969 "Biljo" / "Spider" (RCA 1891) UK No.22/AUS No.76
- 1970 "Everybody Go Home the Party's Over" / "Joseph I'm Calling You" (RCA 1930) UK No.47
- 1970 "Give Me Just a Little More Line" / "I Am the Tail" (RCA 1954) (duet with Kenny Young credited as 'Moonshine')
- 1970 "Tangerines, Tangerines" / "Wolf" (RCA 1966)~
- 1971 "Jack in the Box" / "Someone to Love Me" (RCA 2066)~~ UK No.4/IRL No.5/AUS No.67
- 1971 "Lady Love Bug" / "Stand by Your Man" (RCA 2117) UK No.28/AUS No.68 NZ #10
- 1972 "It's Different Now" / "Take Me Home" (RCA 2192)
- 1972 "You Are My Music" / "One Day" (RCA 2298)
- 1973 "Carolina Days" / "Loving You" (RCA 2355)
- 1974 "That's the Way I've Always Heard It Should Be" / "Ease Your Pain" (RCA 5248)
- 1974 "Get It Together" / "Take Me Home" (RCA 5008)
- 1974 "Saturday Sunday" / "Love Is" (PYE 7N 45387)
- 1977 "Save Me" / "Sleepyhead" (Polydor 2058804)
- 1977 "Put It Back Together" / "Lay Me Down" (Polydor 2058887)
- 1977 "Incident at the Roxy" (Polydor 2058864)
- 1977 "Loving Cup" / "Morning Comes Quickly" (Polydor 2058934)
- 1978 "Love Is Deep Inside of Me" / "Candlelight" (Polydor 2058997)
- 1980 "I Can't Afford That Feeling Anymore" / "My Simple Heart" (Precision 109)
- 1980 "Person to Person" / "My Simple Heart" (Precision 119)
- 1999 "Shake Me" (Mint Royale ft. Clodagh Rodgers) (FHCD010)

== UK television appearances ==
=== 1960s ===
- 26 September 1962 – BBCtv: Adam Faith Show – her TV debut singing "Let’s Jump The Broomstick"
- 10 November 1962 – BBCtv: Adam Faith Show
- 3 January 1963 – BBCtv: Like... Music
- 26 February 1963 – BBCtv: The 625 Show
- 11 June 1963 – BBCtv: The 625 Show
- 22 June 1963 – ITV: Thank Your Lucky Stars
- 18 February 1964 – ITV: The Five O'Clock Club
- 12 October 1968 – BBC2: Colour Me Pop
- 20 February 1969 – ITV: Walk Right In
- 26 February 1969 – ITV: Discotheque
- 17 March 1969 – BBC1: Dee Time
- 10 April 1969 – BBC1: Top Of The Pops
- 17 April 1969 – BBC1: Top Of The Pops
- 24 April 1969 – BBC1: Top Of The Pops
- 8 May 1969 – BBC1: Top Of The Pops
- 31 May 1969 – ITV: Set 'Em Up Joe
- 30 June 1969 – ITV: Mike & Bernie's Show
- 3 July 1969 – BBC1: Top Of The Pops
- 5 July 1969 – BBC1: The Roy Castle Show
- 6 July 1969 – ITV: The Golden Shot
- 12 July 1969 – ITV: Set 'Em Up Joe
- 17 July 1969 – BBC1: Top Of The Pops
- 24 July 1969 – BBC1: Top Of The Pops
- 26 July 1969 – BBC1: Dee Time
- 7 August 1969 – BBC1: Top Of The Pops
- 24 August 1969 – ITV: The Golden Shot
- 25 October 1969 – ITV: Frost On Saturday
- 30 October 1969 – BBC1: Top Of The Pops
- 16 November 1969 – ITV: The Golden Shot
- 25 December 1969 – BBC1: Top Of The Pops Christmas Special

=== 1970s ===
- 3 January 1970 – BBC2: Colour Me Pop
- 17 January 1970 – BBC1: The Val Doonican Show
- 1 March 1970 – ITV: Frost On Sunday
- 14 March 1970 – BBC2: Disco 2
- 25 March 1970 – BBC2: Show Of The Week – The Morecambe And Wise Show
- 8 June 1970 – ITV: Mike And Bernie's Scene
- 11 June 1970 – BBC1: Top Of The Pops
- 13 June 1970 – BBC1: The Roy Castle Show
- 14 June 1970 – ITV: Stars On Sunday
- 4 July 1970 – BBC2: The Val Doonican Show (repeat from BBC1)
- 4 July 1970 – ITV: The Des O’Connor Show
- 19 July 1970 – ITV: The Golden Shot
- 16 August 1970 – ITV: Joe (The Joe Brown Show)
- 22 August 1970 – BBC1: It's Lulu
- 5 September 1970 – ITV: Maggie's Place
- 10 October 1970 – BBC1: The Harry Secombe Show
- 29 October 1970 – BBC1: The Morecambe And Wise Show (repeat from BBC2)
- 12 December 1970 – ATV: It's Tarbuck
- 25 December 1970 – BBC1: Christmas Night With The Stars
- 9 January 1971 – BBC1: It's Cliff Richard
- 16 January 1971 – BBC1: It's Cliff Richard
- 23 January 1971 – BBC1: It's Cliff Richard
- 30 January 1971 – BBC1: It's Cliff Richard
- 6 February 1971 – BBC1: It's Cliff Richard
- 13 February 1971 – BBC1: It's Cliff Richard
- 20 February 1971 – BBC1: It's Cliff Richard (A Song for Europe 1971)
- 27 February 1971 – BBC1: It's Cliff Richard
- 27 March 1971 – BBC1: It's Cliff Richard
- 1 April 1971 – BBC1: Top Of The Pops
- 3 April 1971 – BBC1: The Eurovision Song Contest 1971
- 10 April 1971 – BBC2: The Talk Of The Town
- 24 July 1971 – BBC2: The Harry Secombe Show (repeat from BBC1)
- 29 July 1971 – ITV: It's Tarbuck
- 13 September 1971 - ITV: David Nixon's Magic Box
- 16 September 1971 – BBC1: Top Of The Pops
- 9 October 1971 – BBC1: Bruce Forsyth & The Generation Game
- 11 November 1971 – BBC1: Top Of The Pops
- 1 January 1972 – BBC1: Time For Baxter
- 16 February 1972 – BBC1: Whacko!
- 8 April 1972 – BBC1: Tarbuck's Luck
- 20 April 1972 – BBC1: Top Of The Pops
- 29 April 1972 – ITV: Saturday Variety
- 13 May 1972 – ITV: The Rolf Harris Show
- 31 May 1972 – ITV: Des (The Des O'Connor Show)
- 26 August 1972 – ITV: Saturday Variety
- 7 September 1972 – BBC2: Sacha's In Town
- 3 December 1972 – ITV: The Golden Shot
- 10 December 1972 – ITV: The Golden Shot
- 14 December 1972 – BBC1: Top Of The Pops
- 17 December 1972 – ITV: The Golden Shot
- 26 December 1972 – ITV: All The Jokers – Full House
- 31 December 1972 – BBC1: Top Of The Year
- 1 January 1973 – BBC1: Tarbuck Follies
- 10 April 1973 – ITV: It's Tarbuck
- 5 May 1973 – ITV: Mike & Bernie's Show
- 6 May 1973 – ITV: The Golden Shot
- 9 June 1973 – BBC2: They Sold A Million
- 28 June 1973 – ITV: STV Showcase
- 5 August 1973 – ITV: Russell Harty Plus
- 6 August 1973 – BBC2: Show Of The Week – The Young Generation Big Top
- 25 December 1973 – ITV: Tommy Cooper's Christmas
- 3 January 1974 – BBC2: Show Of The Week – The Two Ronnies
- 24 March 1974 – ITV: Sunday Night At The London Palladium (appearance postponed from 10th January)
- 11 May 1974 – BBC1: Look – Mike Yarwood
- 9 June 1974 – BBC2: They Sold A Million
- 11 June 1974 – ITV: The Tommy Cooper Hour
- 26 July 1974 – ITV: Sez Les
- 27 July 1974 – BBC1: The Two Ronnies (repeat from BBC2)
- 28 December 1974 – ITV: It's Norman
- 31 January 1975 – ITV: Russell Harty
- 2 August 1975 – BBC1: Seaside Special
- 13 December 1975 – BBC1: Seaside Special
- 18 December 1976 – ITV (LWT only): Saturday Scene
- 18 December 1976 – ITV: Supersonic
- 6 January 1977 – BBC1: Top Of The Pops
- 8 January 1977 – ITV: Celebrity Squares
- 8 February 1977 – BBC2: The Musical Time Machine
- 26 February 1977 – BBC1: Ronnie Corbett's Saturday Special
- 19 March 1977 – BBC1: This Is Peter Morrison
- 31 October 1977 – BBC2: Des O’Connor Tonight
- 1 February 1978 – ITV: I'm Bob, He's Dickie
- 17 March 1978 – ITV: When Irish Stars Are Smiling
- 13 April 1978 – BBC1: Ronnie Corbett's Thursday Special
- 18 May 1978 – BBC2: Des O’Connor Tonight (repeat from BBC2)
- 25 December 1978 – ITV: 3-2-1 Christmas Special
- 17 March 1979 – ITV: Stars Across The Water
- 27 April 1979 – BBC1: The Ronnie Corbett Special
- 27 October 1979 – BBC1: The Basil Brush Show
- 14 November 1979 – ITV: London Night Out

=== 1980s – 2020s ===
- 12 November 1980 – ITV: London Night Out
- 4 March 1981 – ITV (Granada Only): Live From Two
- 22 June 1981 – ITV: Now For Nookie
- 11 December 1981 – BBC1: Pebble Mill
- 16 January 1982 – BBC1: The Two Ronnies
- 31 March 1983 – Channel 4: Unforgettable
- 3 May 1991 – BBC1: Gloria Live
- 6 September 1993 – BBC1: Whatever Happened To...?
- 24 April 1994 – BBC1: Biteback
- 4 May 1998 – BBC2: Europigeon
- 10 July 1999 – ITV: Moonshot – The Spirit Of '69
- 2002 – BBC Northern Ireland: Music Asides

== See also ==
- List of RCA Records artists
- List of performers on Top of the Pops

== Notes ==
Preceded by Mary Hopkin with "Knock Knock, Who's There?"	UK in the Eurovision Song Contest; 1971	Succeeded by The New Seekers with "Beg, Steal or Borrow"
