= Heartbeat (Don Johnson album) =

1986 studio album by Don Johnson

Studio album by Don Johnson
- Released: September 30, 1986
- Studios: Criteria (Miami, Florida)
- Genre: Pop rock
- Length: 42:16
- Label: Epic
- Producer: Chas Sandford

Don Johnson chronology
| Heartbeat (1986) | Let It Roll (1989) |

Professional ratings
Review scores
| Source | Rating |
|---|---|
| AllMusic | 2.5/5 stars |

Heartbeat is the debut studio album by American actor and singer Don Johnson, released on September 30, 1986, by Epic Records. In the United States, the album peaked at number 17 on the Billboard 200 in October 1986 and was certified Gold by the Recording Industry Association of America (RIAA) the following month. The title track peaked at number five on the Billboard Hot 100.

In 1998, the album was reissued by Razor & Tie with six additional tracks from Johnson's follow-up album, Let It Roll (1989).

== Background ==
In a 1987 interview with the Los Angeles Times, Johnson stated, "I wanted the record to be modern, tough rock and I think I achieved that on some level. I didn't want it to sound like something that other people designed and I just stopped by for a few minutes to do the vocals. And I made it clear to Walter [Yetnikoff, then president and CEO of CBS Records] that I would walk away from it if I didn't think it was credible. I was prepared every step of the way to throw it away and walk away."

Musician reviewer J. D. Considine wrote: "Don Johnson sings as well as Glenn Frey acts." Anita Sarko in Spin commented that with 'Johnson having a voice, should maybe rethink his fascination with Southern boogie and L. A. AOR'.

== Track listing ==
All tracks produced by Chas Sandford, except tracks 11–16, produced by Keith Diamond.

Side one
| No. | Title | Writer(s) | Length |
|---|---|---|---|
| 1. | "Heartbeat" | Eric Kaz; Wendy Waldman | 4:20 |
| 2. | "Voice on a Hotline" | Kathy Wakefield; Bill LaBounty | 4:05 |
| 3. | "The Last Sound Love Makes" | Tony Sciuto; Sam Egorin; John Capek | 4:27 |
| 4. | "Lost in Your Eyes" | Tom Petty | 4:33 |
| 5. | "Coco Don't" | Peter Kaye; Nan O'Byrne | 3:33 |

Side two
| No. | Title | Writer(s) | Length |
|---|---|---|---|
| 6. | "Heartache Away" | Steve Cochran | 4:49 |
| 7. | "Love Roulette" | Don Johnson; Mark Leonard | 4:20 |
| 8. | "Star Tonight" | Bob Seger | 2:54 |
| 9. | "Gotta Get Away" | Chas Sandford | 4:27 |
| 10. | "Can't Take Your Memory" | Johnson; Curly Smith | 4:30 |
| Total length: | | | 42:16 |

1998 reissue bonus tracks
| No. | Title | Writer(s) | Length |
|---|---|---|---|
| 11. | "Other People's Lives" | Diane Warren | 5:28 |
| 12. | "Angel City" | Johnson; Keith Diamond; Michael Des Barres; Dave Resnik | 4:25 |
| 13. | "When You Only Loved Me" | Jeff Daniels; Harold Allen | 3:57 |
| 14. | "Let It Roll" | Johnson; Diamond | 4:21 |
| 15. | "What If It Takes All Night" | Clyde Lieberman; Jeffrey Pescetto; Richard James Burgess | 3:48 |
| 16. | "Little One's Lullaby" | Johnson; Diamond | 3:23 |
| Total length: | | | 67:51 |

== Personnel ==
Credits adapted from the liner notes of Heartbeat.

=== Musicians ===
- Don Johnson – lead vocals (all tracks)
- Chas Sandford – guitar (all tracks); guitar solo (track 1); background vocals (tracks 3, 5, 7); piano, tambourine (track 6)
- Mark Leonard – bass (all tracks)
- Curly Smith – drums (tracks 1–10)
- Charles Judge – keyboards (tracks 1–4, 9, 10)
- Bill Champlin – background vocals (tracks 1–3, 5, 7); keyboards (tracks 2, 5); organ (track 6)
- Tamara Champlin – background vocals (tracks 1–3, 5, 7)
- Dweezil Zappa – guitar solo (track 3)
- Bonnie Raitt – harmony vocals (tracks 4, 6)
- Earl Gardner – horns (tracks 5, 7)
- Lenny Pickett – horns (tracks 5, 7); sax solo (track 5); horn arrangements
- Michael Des Barres – background vocals (track 5)
- Ron Wood – acoustic guitar (track 6); guitars, harmony vocals (track 7)
- Stevie Ray Vaughan – guitar solo (tracks 6, 7)
- Dickey Betts – guitars (track 7)
- Jamie Skylar – background vocals (track 7)
- Willie Nelson – solo, harmony vocals (track 8)
- Mickey Raphael – harmonica (track 8)

=== Technical ===
- Chas Sandford – production, mixing (Note: Mixed at Criteria Recording Studios (Miami, Florida))
- Gary McGachan – engineering, mixing
- Dave Axelbaum – second engineer
- Stephen Marcussen – mastering
- Stuart Furusho – mastering (Note: Mastered at Precision Lacquer (Hollywood, California))

=== Artwork ===
- Frank Olinsky (Manhattan Design) – art direction
- Roberta Ludlow – cover illustration
- Mary Ellen Mark – back cover photo, inside photo (left)
- Stephen Frailey – inside photo (right)
- Jerry Tobias – collage photos, inner sleeve photo
- Glenn Watson – collage photos
- Diane Sillan – collage photos
- Mark Penberthy – inner sleeve illustration

== Charts ==
=== Weekly charts ===
Weekly chart performance for Heartbeat
| Chart (1986–1987) | Peak position |
|---|---|
| Australian Albums (Kent Music Report) | 44 |
| Austrian Albums (Ö3 Austria) | 3 |
| Canada Top Albums/CDs (RPM) | 21 |
| Dutch Albums (Album Top 100) | 20 |
| European Albums (Music & Media) | 22 |
| Finnish Albums (Suomen virallinen lista) | 5 |
| German Albums (Offizielle Top 100) | 3 |
| Norwegian Albums (VG-lista) | 7 |
| Swedish Albums (Sverigetopplistan) | 34 |
| Swiss Albums (Schweizer Hitparade) | 7 |
| US Billboard 200 | 17 |

=== Year-end charts ===
1986 year-end chart performance for Heartbeat
| Chart (1986) | Position |
|---|---|
| Canada Top Albums/CDs (RPM) | 92 |

1987 year-end chart performance for Heartbeat
| Chart (1987) | Position |
|---|---|
| Austrian Albums (Ö3 Austria) | 19 |
| European Albums (Music & Media) | 57 |
| German Albums (Offizielle Top 100) | 28 |
| Norwegian Fall Period Albums (VG-lista) | 9 |

== Certifications ==
Certifications for Heartbeat
| Region | Certification | Certified units/sales |
|---|---|---|
| Canada (Music Canada) | Platinum | 100,000^{^} |
| Finland (Musiikkituottajat) | Gold | 28,470 |
| Germany (BVMI) | Gold | 250,000^{^} |
| Switzerland (IFPI Switzerland) | Gold | 25,000^{^} |
| United States (RIAA) | Gold | 500,000^{^} |
^{^} Shipments figures based on certification alone.
