= You Are My Music =

Studio album by Clodagh Rodgers
- Released: 1973
- Genre: Popular
- Label: RCA
- Producer: Keith Mansfield

Clodagh Rodgers chronology
It's Different Now (1972)	You Are My Music (1973)	Come Back And Shake Me (1973)

You Are My Music is an album by Irish singer and actress Clodagh Rodgers. Her sixth release, it was published in 1973 on the RCA label.

== Track listing ==
1. "Carolina Days" (Junior Campbell)
2. "Ease Your Pain" (Hoyt Axton)
3. "Lean On Me" (Cobb/McCoy)
4. "Children Of My Mind" (Osborne)
5. "All Kinds Of People" (Burt Bacharach/Hal David)
6. "Day By Day" (Stephen Schwartz)
7. "You Are My Music" (Peter Gosling)
8. "Betcha By Golly Wow" (Bell/Creed)
9. "What In The World" (Peter Gosling/Keith Mansfield)
10. "Together We'll Make It" (Peter Gosling/Keith Mansfield)
11. "That's The Way I've Always Heard It Should Be" (Carly Simon)
12. "One Day" (Peter Gosling)

== Production ==
- Recorded at Wessex Sound Studios
- Engineers - Mike Thompson & Geoff Workman
- Assistant Engineer- Roger Ginsley
- Conductor - Pete Smith
- Mastering Engineer - Arun Chakraverty
- Vocal Backing - "Three's A Crowd"
- Photography - James Wedge
