= Irlene Mandrell =

American musician (born 1956)

- Born: Ellen Irlene Mandrell; January 29, 1956 (age 70); Corpus Christi, Texas, U.S.
- Occupation: Musician
- Known for: Younger sister of Barbara and Louise Mandrell
- Notable work: Annual Irlene Mandrell Celebrity Shoot
- Spouses: Ric Boyer (div. 1992) Rob Pincus (m. 1994; div. 2004) Patrick Holt (m. 2015)
- Children: 3
- Parents: Irby Matthew Mandrell (father); Mary Ellen (née McGill) Mandrell (mother)
- Relatives: Barbara Mandrell (sister); Louise Mandrell (sister)
- Website: irlenemandrell.com

Ellen Irlene Mandrell (born January 29, 1956) is an American musician. She is the younger sister of country singers Barbara and Louise Mandrell.

Irlene Mandrell first rose to prominence as a model for CoverGirl, and later gained national attention when she appeared from 1980 to 1982 with her siblings on the highly rated Barbara Mandrell and the Mandrell Sisters TV variety show. Shortly after the show's cancellation, she joined the cast of Hee Haw for a number of years as one of the "Hee Haw Honeys." She also appeared on two episodes of The Love Boat, and worked as a commercial spokesperson for a wide range of products. She has also competed in auto racing.

Since the late 1990s, Mandrell has hosted the annual Irlene Mandrell Celebrity Shoot to raise money for Wish Upon a Star, Inc. and the Boy Scouts of America.

== Early life ==
Ellen Irlene Mandrell was born on January 29, 1956, to Mary Ellen (née McGill; born 1931) and Irby Matthew Mandrell (October 11, 1924 – March 5, 2009) in Corpus Christi, Texas. Sister Barbara is older by seven years; Louise, by a year and a half. Irlene's mother Mary was a homemaker and musician hailing from rural Wayne County, Illinois. Her father Irby was a World War II naval veteran and Texas police officer from Garland County, Arkansas. Irby Mandrell was an accomplished musician and entrepreneur, as well. He used his impeccable social skills and knowledge of the music industry to manage all three of his daughters' careers for over three decades.

Mandrell's early life started off much like her older sisters'. Her family was always musical; her parents came from a musical background. She played the drums as one of the first members of Barbara's band, The Do Rites; she is one of the first commercially significant female drummers. She also played vibraphone and mandolin.

== Career ==
She appeared from 1980 to 1982 with her siblings on the successful Barbara Mandrell and the Mandrell Sisters television variety show. The show had 40 million viewers weekly and was the last successful American primetime TV variety show. Mandrell captured two awards for Comedy Act of the Year from Music City News and later sought opportunities in film, television, and video. Her many fans followed her talents as she joined the cast of Hee Haw, where she had an eight-year run (1983–1991) as one of the "Hee Haw Honeys". Irlene has also made appearances on other television shows, including The Love Boat, The Oprah Winfrey Show, The Tonight Show Starring Johnny Carson, The Mike Douglas Show, and many game shows. She appeared as a celebrity panelist on Password Plus in 1981 and Match Game in 1982.

She co-hosted Bright Lights & Country Nights and This Week in Country Music, and televised benefits with names such as George Lindsey, Bob Hope, and Sammy Davis Jr. Mandrell has been a model for several companies, including Cover Girl shoes, Lanne Skin Care products, and 9West shoes.

On May 23, 2015, Irlene released her first single, "We Will Stand", which went to number 1 on the Indie charts.

== Personal life ==
Mandrell was married to Ric Boyer, whom she divorced in 1992. They have two children. She married Rob Pincus in 1994, with whom she has one child, Christina Mandrell (Christina appeared on “The Bachelor” franchise, where she became engaged after meeting her fiancé Brayden Bowers off-screen). Irlene Mandrell and Pincus were divorced in 2004. In 2015, she married musician Patrick Holt.

She is an accomplished hunter. She has hunted North America extensively (in the U.S. and Mexico) and has taken hunting trips to South America and Africa. Mandrell is proficient with handguns, shotguns, rifles, and crossbows. She is competitive in many sporting events, including as a race car driver. The Irlene Mandrell Celebrity Shoot raises a large amount of money for Wish Upon A Star and the Boy Scouts.

As of 2012, Irlene Mandrell is a celebrity spokesperson for several companies, such as CZ-USA, She Safari, Horton Crossbows, DRT Ammo, Wild Ride Beef Jerky, and Deerassic Park. She has appeared on several outdoor shows, and was featured in "Irlene Mandrell: Straight Shooter", a segment on PBS's Tennessee's Wildside.
