= Don Johnson =

American actor (born 1949)

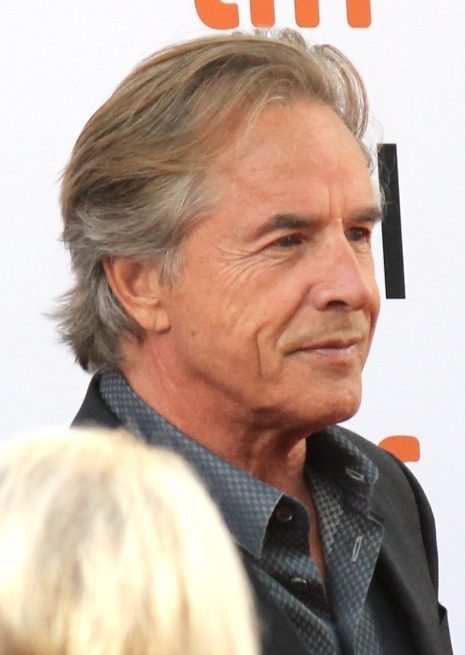
- Johnson in 2019
- Born: Don Wayne Johnson; December 15, 1949 (age 76); Flat Creek, Missouri, U.S.
- Occupations: Actor; producer; singer
- Years active: 1969–present
- Spouses: Unknown spouse (m. 1968; annul. 1968) Another unknown spouse (m. 1973; annul. 1973) Melanie Griffith (m. 1976; div. 1976) (m. 1989; div. 1996) Kelley Phleger (m. 1999)
- Partner: Patti D'Arbanville (1981–1985)
- Children: 5, including Jesse and Dakota

Don Wayne Johnson (born December 15, 1949) is an American actor and singer-songwriter. He played the role of James "Sonny" Crockett in the 1980s television series Miami Vice, for which he won a Golden Globe, and received a Primetime Emmy Award nomination. He also played the titular character in the 1990s series Nash Bridges. Johnson received a star on the Hollywood Walk of Fame in 1996.

Johnson has appeared in films such as A Boy and His Dog (1975), The Hot Spot (1990), Guilty as Sin (1993), Tin Cup (1996), Machete (2010), Django Unchained (2012), Cold in July (2014) and Knives Out (2019). He released the albums Heartbeat (1986) and Let It Roll (1989) as a singer. His cover version of "Heartbeat" peaked at number 5 on the Billboard Hot 100.

== Early life ==
Johnson was born on December 15, 1949, in his grandmother's house in Flat Creek, Missouri. His mother, Nell (née Wilson), was a beautician. His father, Fredie Wayne Johnson, was a farmer. At the time of his birth, Johnson's mother and father were 16 and 19 years old, respectively. Johnson was raised in Wichita, Kansas, where his parents relocated when he was five years old and where his father worked for Boeing Aircraft. He has described his childhood as "incredibly dysfunctional and abusive" as his parents were both frequently absent and stressed. His father subjected the children to corporal punishment. According to Johnson, he was 12 years old when he lost his virginity to his 16-year-old babysitter. Johnson's parents divorced when he was 12. He continued to live with his mother, younger sister and two younger brothers until he was 13, at which time he ended up in juvenile court and was sent to live with his father in Missouri.

He moved back home to Wichita for his senior year of high school, working part-time as a butcher's apprentice and ladies' shoe salesman. He attended Wichita South High School, from which he graduated in 1967. When he was kicked off the school's football team, Johnson enrolled in a drama class to earn enough credits to graduate. Encouraged by his teacher, he played the lead role of Tony in West Side Story. He was also exposed to the plays of Molière, Tennessee Williams and Shakespeare. During his last semester, he auditioned for the summer repertory program at the University of Kansas and won a partial scholarship. He was subsequently awarded a full scholarship to attend as a drama major. There, Johnson, 18, dated his 29-year-old acting teacher. In his sophomore year, he left to San Francisco after passing an audition for the American Conservatory Theater.

== Acting career ==
=== Early years ===
Johnson's first major role was in the 1969 stage production of Fortune and Men's Eyes, in which he played the lead role of Smitty. The play was produced and directed by Sal Mineo at the Coronet Theatre in Los Angeles. It included a "shockingly realistic prison rape" scene portrayed by Johnson. This exposure led to the quickly forgotten film The Magic Garden of Stanley Sweetheart (1970). Johnson continued to work on stage, film and television without breaking into stardom. His notable films from this period were Zachariah (1971), Lollipop and Roses (1971), The Harrad Experiment (1973) (a film in which Johnson displayed frontal nudity) and A Boy and His Dog (1975). In 1976, Johnson was the roommate of Sal Mineo at the time Mineo was murdered.

=== Miami Vice and stardom ===
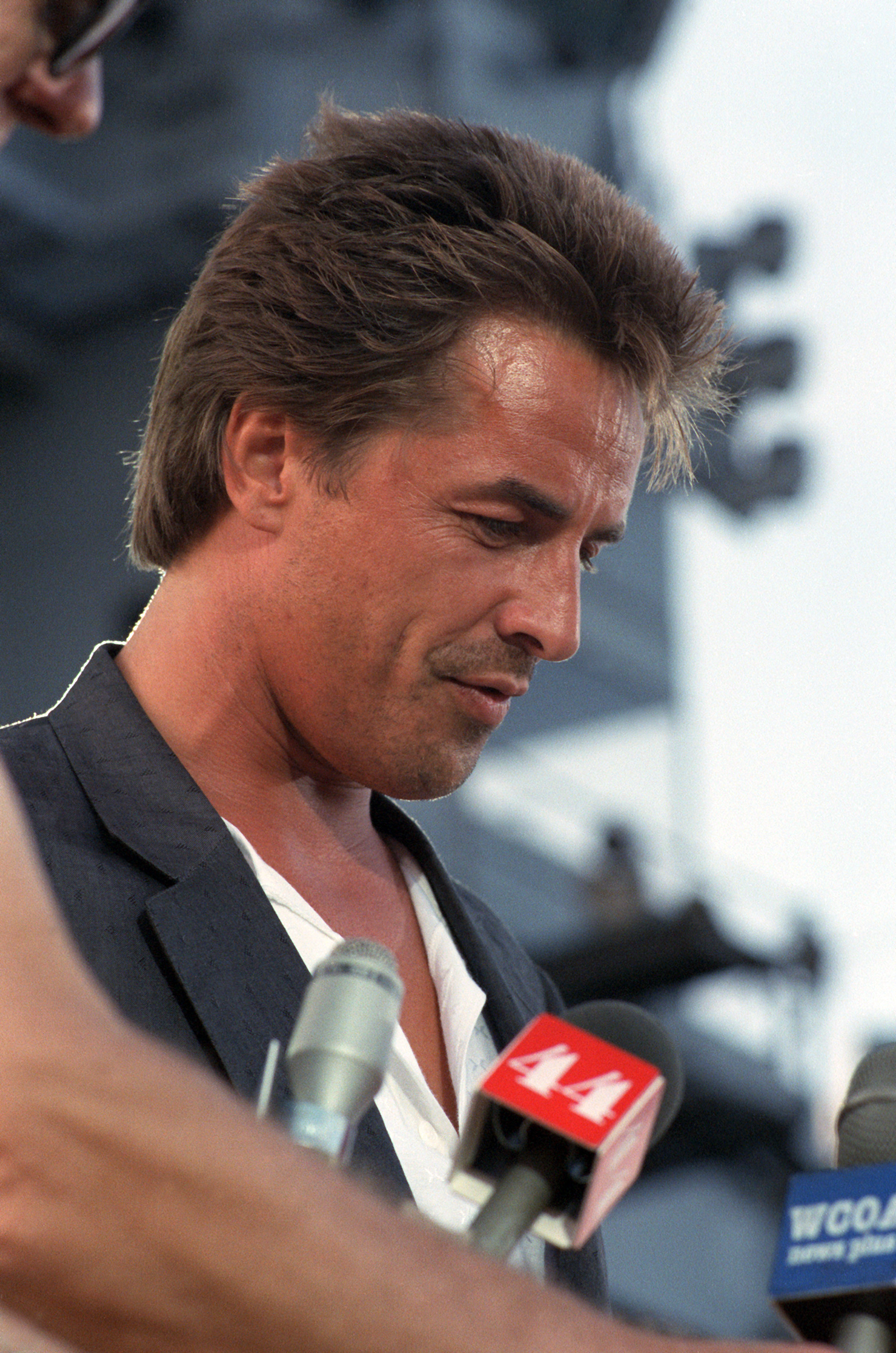
Johnson in 1986

In 1984, after years of struggling to establish himself as a TV actor, Johnson landed a starring role as undercover police detective Sonny Crockett in the Michael Mann/Universal Television cop series, Miami Vice. The show ran from 1984 to 1990. Miami Vice made Johnson "a major international star". According to Rolling Stone, "No one had more swagger in the Reagan era than Don Johnson. As Miami Vice's Sonny Crockett, the undercover detective and professional stubble-cultivator who lived on a houseboat with his pet alligator Elvis, he embodied masculine cool in the era of coke binges and Lamborghinis". The Sonny Crockett character typically wore thousand-dollar Versace and Armani suits over pastel cotton T-shirts, drove a Ferrari, wore expensive timepieces by Rolex and Ebel, and lived on an Endeavour yacht. Miami Vice was noted for its revolutionary use of music and cinematography, and for its glitzy take on the police drama genre. In the show, Crockett's partner was Ricardo Tubbs, played by Philip Michael Thomas.

Johnson's work on Miami Vice earned him a Golden Globe Award for Best Performance by an Actor in a Television Series – Drama, in 1986. He was nominated for the same award in 1987. He was also nominated for a Primetime Emmy Award for Outstanding Lead Actor in a Drama Series in 1985.

Between seasons on Miami Vice, Johnson gained further renown through the TV miniseries The Long Hot Summer (1985), a remake of the 1958 film. During the time he was on Miami Vice, he had set up an hour-long music video/pay cable program with videocassette versions of the programs Johnson had hosted being handled by distributor CBS/Fox Video. The project was a tie-in to his first album Heartbeat, which was released by CBS/Epic Records in 1986.

In 1988, he starred in the romantic comedy Sweet Hearts Dance, alongside Susan Sarandon, Jeff Daniels and Elizabeth Perkins. In 1989 he played the sheriff of Los Angeles County Jerry Beck in John Frankenheimer's film Dead Bang.

In the early 1990s, Johnson played a variety of roles in well-produced films, including the role of drifter and car salesman Harry Maddox in Dennis Hopper's The Hot Spot (1990) opposite Jennifer Connelly and Virginia Madsen. He worked on two films with his wife Melanie Griffith, Paradise (1991) and Born Yesterday (1993). He appeared alongside Mickey Rourke in Harley Davidson and the Marlboro Man (1991), and in Sidney Lumet's thriller Guilty as Sin (1993), opposite Rebecca De Mornay.

=== Nash Bridges ===
Johnson later starred in the 1996–2001 CBS-TV police drama Nash Bridges with Cheech Marin, Jeff Perry, Jaime P. Gomez, Kelly Hu, Wendy Moniz, Annette O'Toole, Jodi Lyn O'Keefe as his daughter Cassidy, and James Gammon as his father Nick. Johnson portrayed the title role, an inspector (later promoted to captain) for the San Francisco Police Department. In Nash Bridges, Johnson was again paired with a flashy convertible car, a yellow 1971 Plymouth Barracuda.

=== 2001–2010 ===
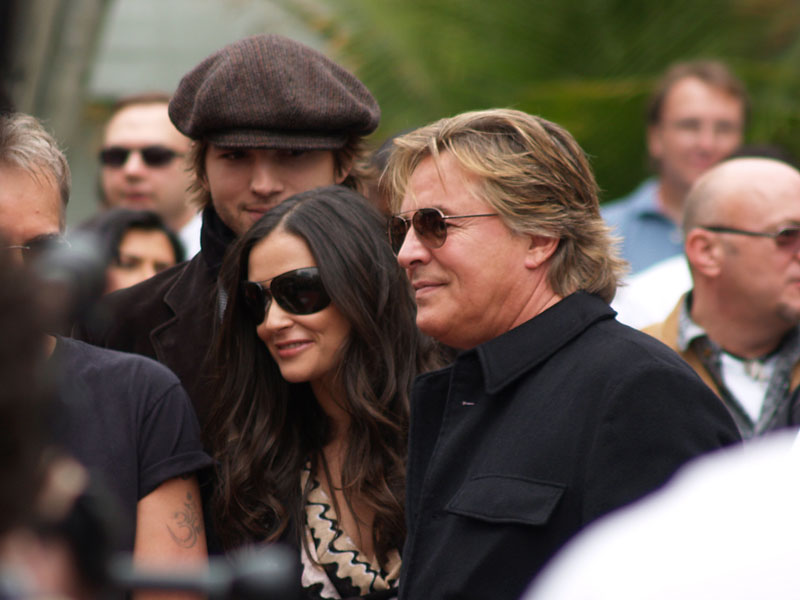
Don Johnson with Demi Moore and Ashton Kutcher at the Hollywood Walk of Fame in 2006

In the fall of 2005, Johnson briefly starred in The WB courtroom television drama show Just Legal as a jaded lawyer with a young and idealistic protégé/partner (Jay Baruchel); the show was canceled in October 2005 after just three of the eight produced episodes aired. In January 2007, Johnson began a run in the West End of London production of Guys and Dolls as Nathan Detroit.

Johnson also had a role in the Norwegian comedy Lange Flate Ballær 2 ("Long Flat Balls II"), directed by Johnson's friend Harald Zwart. Johnson did the movie as a favor to Zwart. The movie was launched on March 14, 2008, in Norway, with Johnson making an appearance at the premiere. He next appeared in When in Rome with Danny DeVito, Anjelica Huston and Kristen Bell.

Johnson had a supporting role in Robert Rodriguez's film Machete. Johnson played Von Jackson, "a twisted border vigilante leading a small army". The film was released on September 3, 2010. In October 2010, he began appearing on the HBO series Eastbound & Down, playing Kenny Powers' long-lost father, going by the alias "Eduardo Sanchez". He also reprised his role as Sonny Crockett for a Nike commercial with LeBron James in which the NBA player contemplates acting and appears alongside Johnson on Miami Vice.

=== 2011–present ===
In September 2011, Johnson had a cameo in the comedy A Good Old Fashioned Orgy with Jason Sudeikis. Johnson had a supporting role in the 2012 Quentin Tarantino film Django Unchained, playing a southern plantation owner named Spencer 'Big Daddy' Bennett. In 2014, Johnson starred as the character "Jim Bob" opposite Sam Shepard and Michael C. Hall in Jim Mickle's critically acclaimed crime film, Cold in July. In 2015, Johnson began starring in the ABC prime time soap opera Blood & Oil.

In 2018, he starred as the character of Arthur, the love interest of Vivian, played by Jane Fonda in Bill Holderman's romantic-comedy Book Club. In 2019, Johnson played the role of Richard Drysdale in Rian Johnson's murder-mystery Knives Out; and starred as Police Chief Judd Crawford in the HBO series Watchmen.

In 2021, Johnson co-starred on Kenan until its cancellation in May 2022. He also appeared in a Nash Bridges television film with co-star Cheech Marin on the USA Network in 2021.

In April 2024, it was announced that Johnson would be starring in the Ryan Murphy drama television series, Doctor Odyssey, which premiered on ABC and Hulu on September 26, 2024. On June 27, 2025, the series was canceled by default after one season after the main cast's options expired.

== Music career ==
Johnson released two albums of pop music in the 1980s. Heartbeat was released in 1986. Let it Roll was released in 1989. His single "Heartbeat" reached No. 5 on the Billboard Hot 100 singles chart.

"Till I Loved You", a duet with then-girlfriend Barbra Streisand, was a top 40 hit on the Billboard Hot 100. It was released on the Columbia Records studio album Till I Loved You on October 25, 1988. The song was re-released on the Streisand album Duets in 2002.

== Personal life ==
=== Reputation ===
Outside his acting career, Johnson developed a reputation for leading a luxurious and hedonistic lifestyle. He was known for his hard-partying and having a large number of romantic relationships. At the height of his Miami Vice fame in the 1980s, he was a frequent drug user, including alcohol, marijuana, and cocaine, as well as Quaaludes. Johnson has described hosting parties where he and friends would invite numerous models through local modeling agencies. He was also a regular at "super-exclusive" parties in Florida attended by politicians, police, drug dealers, and "the best-looking hookers in the business".

=== Relationships and family ===
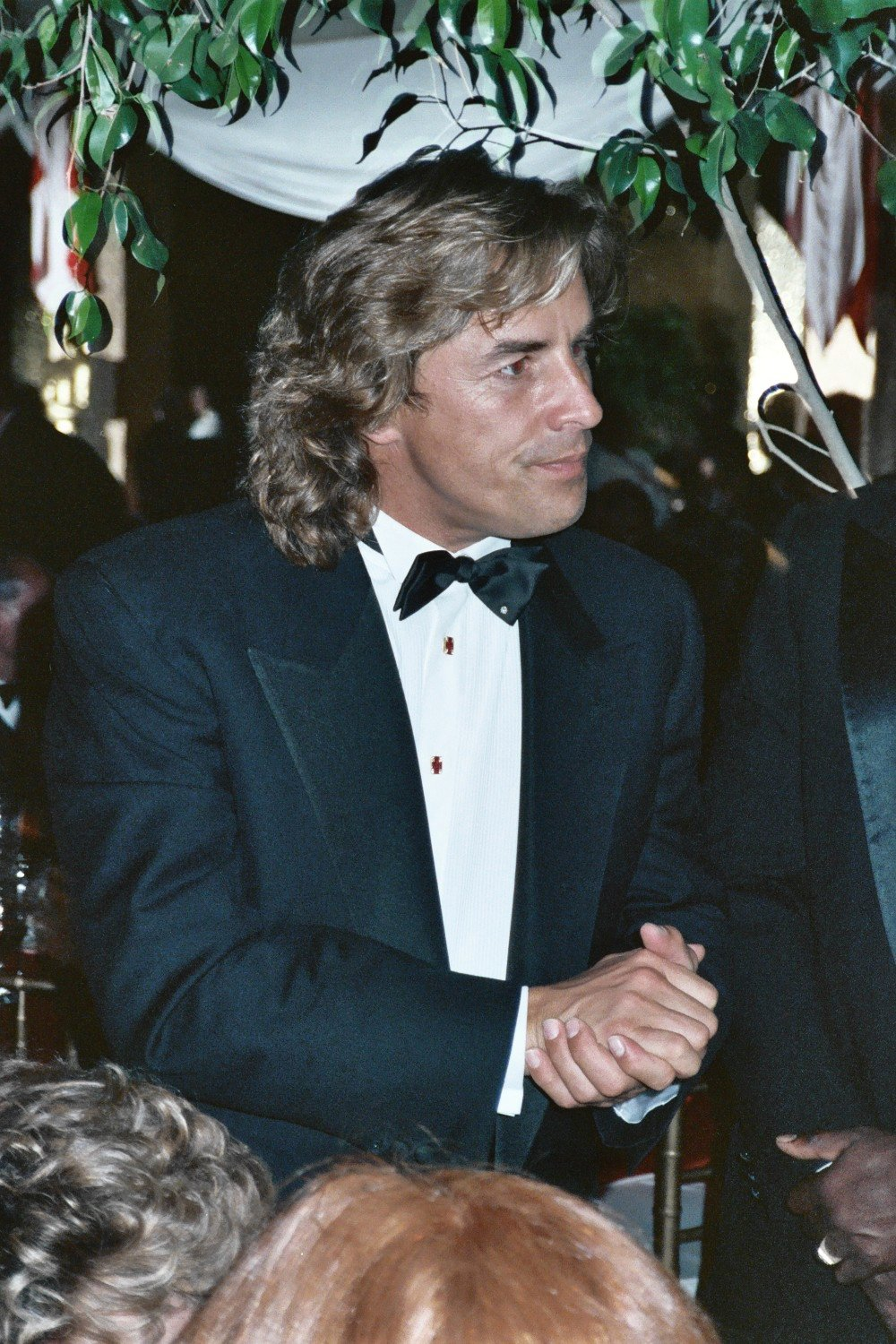
Johnson in 1989

In 1968, at the age of 18, Johnson married a dancer; the marriage was annulled around two months later. Her name has not been made public. Circa 1971, Johnson lived with self-described "groupie" Pamela Des Barres. In 1973, Johnson married his second wife, but the marriage was annulled days later. Her name has also not been made public, though he has called her a "rich bimbo". During the first half of 1972, Johnson met Melanie Griffith, the 14-year-old daughter of his Harrad Experiment co-star Tippi Hedren. The pair moved in together when Griffith was 15 and Johnson was 23. On her 18th birthday they became engaged, and were married in January 1976; they separated that July and divorced in November.

Johnson dated country music singer Tanya Tucker after the two worked together on the 1979 TV movies Amateur Night at the Dixie Bar and Grill and The Rebels. In 1980, Johnson dated Sally Adams, mother of actress Nicollette Sheridan. In January 1981, he split from Tucker after meeting Warhol model Patti D'Arbanville at a Los Angeles restaurant. The pair lived together from 1981 to 1985 but never married. Johnson and D'Arbanville have a son, Jesse Wayne Johnson (born December 7, 1982).

In the early 1980s, Johnson dated model Donya Fiorentino after he moved in next door to her family in Florida. Fiorentino broke up with Johnson but reunited with him in 1986 after she broke up with Andrew Ridgeley. In her 2000 autobiography Cybill Disobedience, Cybill Shepherd wrote of a liaison with Johnson during the making of the television miniseries The Long Hot Summer (1985). Johnson next had a relationship with Barbra Streisand, lasting into at least September 1988. He was briefly involved with his Dead Bang (1989) co-star Penelope Ann Miller.

Just days after breaking up with Streisand, Johnson, then 38, was linked to 18-year-old Uma Thurman. Johnson then reunited with Griffith, who conceived his child close to the start of 1989, Dakota Johnson (born October 4, 1989); they were married again from June of that year until 1996. In 1995, Johnson was romantically linked to model Kari Whitman. In 1996–1997, Johnson dated Jodi Lyn O'Keefe, who played his daughter on Nash Bridges.

On April 29, 1999, Johnson married San Francisco socialite and Montessori nursery school teacher Kelley Phleger, former longtime girlfriend of Gavin Newsom, at the Pacific Heights mansion of Ann and Gordon Getty. Actor Robert Wagner served as best man, and Mayor Willie Brown presided over the civil ceremony. Johnson and Phleger have three children together: a daughter, Atherton Grace (born December 28, 1999), and two sons, Jasper Breckinridge (born June 6, 2002), and Deacon (born April 29, 2006). Johnson was "best friends" with journalist Hunter S. Thompson, who wrote for Nash Bridges, and his daughter Dakota saw Thompson as a "godfather figure." Johnson is also a friend of socialite Denise Hale, the former wife of director Vincente Minnelli. The two were once the subject of reports alleging a romantic relationship, which both denied, stating they were merely friends.

=== Powerboat racing ===
Johnson entered powerboat racing and sometimes raced with Kurt Russell and Chuck Norris. In 1986, Johnson achieved his first motor sport victory. He won a 1,100-mile (1,800 km) powerboat race up the Mississippi River from New Orleans to St. Louis. Characterized by shipmates as an aggressive, fearless pilot who did not make mistakes, Johnson became American Power Boat Association's World Champion of the Offshore World Cup in 1988.

=== Legal matters ===
In April 1997, Johnson was sued by his former chauffeur and a former production assistant for Nash Bridges, both of whom accused him of sexual harassment. Johnson accused them of defamation and alleged they had conspired to extort $1.5 million from him. In January 1998, Johnson and the two women dropped civil charges against each other in a confidential settlement.

In July 2001, a woman sued Johnson, alleging that he grabbed her inappropriately at a sushi bar in San Francisco. The district attorney reviewed the evidence and declined to file criminal charges. Johnson's representatives maintained the accusations were meritless.

In November 2002, German customs officers at the Swiss–German border performed a routine search of Johnson's car. Bank statements evidencing US$8 billion in transactions were found in the trunk of his car. He was accompanied in his black Mercedes-Benz by three men: an investment adviser, a personal assistant, and a third unknown individual who could not be identified. Initially it was thought Johnson was involved in money laundering, but he was cleared of wrongdoing.

In May 2008, within hours of losing his Woody Creek, Colorado, home to foreclosure, Johnson paid off his $14.5 million debt.

In July 2010, a Los Angeles jury awarded Johnson $23.2 million in a lawsuit against production company Rysher Entertainment, from whom Johnson sought a share of profits commensurate with his ownership of half the copyright of Nash Bridges. Rysher announced it would appeal the verdict. In January 2013, Rysher settled the suit with a $19 million payment.

== Filmography ==
=== Film ===
Year	Title	Role	Notes
1970	The Magic Garden of Stanley Sweetheart	Stanley Sweetheart	
1971	Lollipops and Roses	Franky	
1971	Zachariah	Matthew	
1973	The Harrad Experiment	Stanley Cole	
1975	A Boy and His Dog	Vic	
1975	Return to Macon County	Harley McKay	
1981	Swan Lake	Benno	Voice; English version
1981	Soggy Bottom, U.S.A.	Jacob Gorch	
1982	Melanie	Carl	
1982	Aladdin and the Wonderful Lamp	Wazir's Son	Voice; English version
1985	Cease Fire	Tim Murphy	
1987	G.I. Joe: The Movie	Lieutenant Vincent R. Falcone / Lieutenant Falcon	Voice; Direct-to-video
1988	Sweet Hearts Dance	Wiley Boon	
1989	Dead Bang	Jerry Beck	
1990	The Hot Spot	Harry Madox	
1991	Harley Davidson and the Marlboro Man	Robert Lee Edison / The Marlboro Man	
1991	Paradise	Ben Reed	
1993	Born Yesterday	Paul Verrall	
1993	Guilty as Sin	David Edgar Greenhill	
1996	Tin Cup	David Simms	
1998	Goodbye Lover	Ben Dunmore	
2007	Moondance Alexander	Dante Longpre	
2007	Bastardi	Sante Patene	
2008	Lange Flate Ballær 2	Admiral Burnett	
2008	Torno a vivere da solo	Nico	Johnson's voice was dubbed by Roberto Pedicini
2010	When in Rome	Mr. Martin	Uncredited
2010	Machete	Von Jackson	
2011	Four Loko Vineyards	Mr. Four Loko	Short film
2011	A Good Old Fashioned Orgy	Jerry Keppler	Uncredited
2011	Bucky Larson: Born to Be a Star	Miles Deep	
2012	Django Unchained	Spencer 'Big Daddy' Bennett	
2014	Cold in July	Jim Bob Luke	
2014	The Other Woman	Frank Whitten	
2015	Alex of Venice	Roger	
2017	Vengeance: A Love Story	Jay Kirkpatrick	
2017	Brawl in Cell Block 99	Warden Tuggs	
2018	Book Club	Arthur	
2018	Dragged Across Concrete	Lieutenant G. Calvert	
2019	Vault	Gerard 'Gerry The Frenchman' Ouimette	Also executive producer
2019	Knives Out	Richard Drysdale	
2022	A Little White Lie	T. Wasserman	
2022	High Heat	Ray	
2023	Book Club: The Next Chapter	Arthur	
2023	The Collective	Liam	
2024	Unit 234: The Lock Up	Jules	Also executive producer
2024	Rebel Ridge	Sandy Burnne	

=== Television ===
Year	Title	Role	Notes
1971	Sarge	Deloy Coopersmith	Episode: "The Combatants"
1972	Young Dr. Kildare	Ted Thatcher	Episode: "House Call"
1972	The Bold Ones: The New Doctors	Ev Howard	Episode: "Endtheme"
1973	Kung Fu	Nashebo	Episode: "The Spirit-Helper"
1974	The Rookies	Al Devering	Episode: "The Teacher"
1976	The Streets of San Francisco	Officer Larry Wilson	Episode: "Hot Dog"
1976	Barnaby Jones	Wayne Lockwood	Episode: "Renegade's Child"
1976	Law of the Land	Quirt	Television film
1977	The City	Sergeant Brian Scott	Pilot
1977	Cover Girls	Johnny Wilson	Television film
1977	Nashville 99	Mike Watling	Episode: "Sing Me a Song to Die By"
1977	Eight Is Enough	Doug	Episode: "Trial Marriage"
1977	Big Hawaii	Gandy	Episode: "Gandy"
1977	Police Story	Lee Morgan	Episode: "Trigger Point"
1978	What Really Happened to the Class of '65?	Edgar	Episode: "Class Crusader"
1978	The American Girls	Everett Simms	Episode: "A Crash Course in Survival"
1978	Pressure Point	Unknown	Television film
1978	Ski Lift to Death	Mike Sloan	Television film
1978	The Two-Five	Charlie Morgan	Television film
1978	Katie: Portrait of a Centerfold	Gunther	Television film
1978	First, You Cry	Daniel Easton	Television film
1979	Amateur Night at the Dixie Bar and Grill	Cowboy	Television film
1979	The Rebels	Judson Fletcher	2 episodes
1980	Beulah Land	Bonard Davis	Episode: "Part I"
1980	Revenge of the Stepford Wives	Officer Andy Brady	Television film
1980	From Here to Eternity	Private Jefferson 'Jeff' Davis Prewitt	13 episodes
1981	Elvis and the Beauty Queen	Elvis Presley	Television film
1981	The Two Lives of Carol Letner	Bob Howard	Television film
1982	Matt Houston	Terry Spence	Episode: "The Woman in White"
1983	Six Pack	Brewster Baker	Pilot
1984–1989	Miami Vice	Detective James "Sonny" Crockett	Main role (111 episodes)
1985	Tales of the Unexpected	Reeve Baker	Episode: "People Don't Do Such Things"
1985	The Long Hot Summer	Ben Quick	Television film
1988, 2015	Saturday Night Live	Himself	2 episodes
1990	Seriously...Phil Collins	Himself	Television film
1995	In Pursuit of Honor	Sergeant John Libbey	Television film
1996–2001	Nash Bridges	Inspector / Captain Nash Bridges	Main role (122 episodes); also executive producer
2003	Word of Honor	Lieutenant Benjamin Tyson	Television film; also co-executive producer
2005–2006	Just Legal	Grant H. Cooper	Main role (8 episodes)
2010	American Dad!	Mr. McCormick	Voice; episode: "Don't Look a Smith Horse in the Mouth"
2010	Southern Discomfort	Unknown	Pilot
2010–2011	Glenn Martin, DDS	Grandpa Whitey	Voice (4 episodes)
2010–2012	Eastbound & Down	Eduardo Sanchez Powers	5 episodes
2011	A Mann's World	Allan Mann	Pilot
2014–2015	From Dusk till Dawn: The Series	Sheriff Earl McGraw	5 episodes
2015	Blood & Oil	'Hap' Briggs	10 episodes
2016	TripTank	Johnny Bahama	Voice; episode: "The Director"
2017	A Series of Unfortunate Events	Sir	2 episodes
2017	Sick Note	Kenny West	6 episodes
2018	LA to Vegas	Jack Silver	Episode: "Jack Silver"
2018	Daddy Issues	Roman	Pilot
2019	Watchmen	Chief Judd Crawford	4 episodes
2020	Home Movie: The Princess Bride	Humperdinck	Episode: "Chapter Seven: The Pit of Despair"
2021–2022	Kenan	Rick Noble	Main role (20 episodes)
2021	Nash Bridges	Nash Bridges	Television film
2024–2025	Doctor Odyssey	Captain Robert Massey	Main role
2026	Life, Larry and the Pursuit of Unhappiness	Doc Holliday	Episode: "Lincoln"

== Discography ==
=== Studio albums ===
Title	Details	Peak chart positions									
Title	Details	US	AUS	AUT	FIN	FRA	GER	NL	NOR	SWE	SWI
Heartbeat	Release date: November 11, 1986; Label: Epic Records; Formats: CD, cassette, LP	17	44	3	5	—	3	20	7	34	7
Let It Roll	Release date: September 20, 1989; Label: Epic Records; Formats: CD, cassette, LP	—	—	23	17	15	2	19	—	35	6
"—" denotes releases that did not chart

=== Compilation albums ===
Title	Details
The Essential	Release date: January 20, 1997; Label: Sony Music Entertainment; Formats: CD, cassette

=== Singles ===
Year	Single	Peak positions											Album
Year	Single	US	AUS	AUT	FIN	FRA	GER	NL	NOR	SWE	SWI	UK	Album
1986	"Heartbeat"	5	26	3	4	—	6	10	5	16	6	46	Heartbeat
1986	"Heartache Away"	56	—	22	—	—	31	25	—	—	—	126	Heartbeat
1987	"Voice on a Hotline"	—	—	—	—	—	—	59	—	—	—	—	Heartbeat
1989	"Tell It Like It Is"	—	—	13	—	6	2	6	—	—	6	84	Let It Roll
1989	"Other People's Lives"	—	—	—	—	46	57	53	—	—	—	—	Let It Roll
1989	"A Better Place" (with Yuri)	—	—	—	—	—	—	—	—	—	—	—	Let It Roll
"—" denotes releases that did not chart

=== Featured singles ===
Year	Single	Artist	Peak chart positions						Album
Year	Single	Artist	US	AUS	FRA	GER	NL	UK	Album
1988	"Till I Loved You"	Don Johnson and Barbra Streisand	25	34	22	26	4	16	Till I Loved You

== Videography ==
- 1987: Heartbeat - Full Length Video (VHS) - (Release date: May 10, 1987)

== Awards and recognition ==
Year	Result	Award	Category	TV/Film
1975	Won	Saturn Award	Best Actor	A Boy and His Dog
1985	Nominated	Emmy Awards	Outstanding Lead Actor in a Drama Series	Miami Vice
1986	Won	Golden Globe Awards	Best Performance by an Actor in a Television Series – Drama	Miami Vice
1987	Nominated	Golden Globe Awards	Best Performance by an Actor in a Television Series – Drama	Miami Vice
1988	Won	APBA Offshore World Cup	Superboat class	
1996	Included	Hollywood Walk of Fame	Star on the Hollywood Walk of Fame	
