= Save Me (Clodagh Rodgers album) =

Studio album by Clodagh Rodgers
- Released: 1977
- Genre: Popular
- Label: Polydor
- Producer: Guy Fletcher

Clodagh Rodgers chronology
Come Back And Shake Me (1973)	Save Me (1977)	You Are My Music - The Best Of Clodagh Rodgers (1996)

Save Me is the eighth album by Northern Irish singer Clodagh Rodgers released in 1977 on the Polydor label. It was her first album for four years and her last to date, excepting compilation albums.

== Track listing ==
All tracks written by Guy Fletcher and Doug Flett except where indicated.

1. "Save Me"
2. "Morning Comes Quickly"
3. "Leaving"
4. "Incident At The Roxy"
5. "Candlelight"
6. "Discovery" (Sally Kemp)
7. "The Sun's On Sausalito" (John Dawson Read)
8. "The Singer Of The Song"
9. "Put It Back Together"
10. "I Can't Survive"
11. "Loving Cup"

== Production ==
- Recorded at Audio International, London
- Producer - Guy Fletcher for Sweet Water Ltd.
- Engineer - Nick Ryan
- Backing vocals - "Rogue" & "Promises"
- Cover Design - Jo Mirowski
- Photography - Fraser Wood
