= Louise Mandrell =

American country music singer (born 1954)

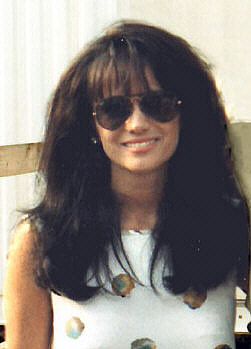
- Mandrell in 1993

Background information
- Also known as: Louise Mandrell
- Born: Thelma Louise Mandrell; July 13, 1954 (age 71); Corpus Christi, Texas, U.S.
- Genres: Country
- Occupations: Singer, entertainer
- Instruments: Vocals; guitar; fiddle; clarinet; drums; saxophone; accordion; keyboard; bass
- Years active: 1977–present
- Labels: Epic; RCA; R&J
- Website: Official website

Thelma Louise Mandrell (born July 13, 1954) is an American country music singer. She is the younger sister of fellow country singer Barbara Mandrell, and older sister of musician Irlene Mandrell. Louise had a successful singing career in country music from the 1970s, with a string of hits during the 1980s.

== Early life ==
Thelma Louise Mandrell was born in 1954, to Mary Ellen (née McGill; born 1931) and Irby Matthew Mandrell (October 11, 1924 – March 5, 2009) in Corpus Christi, Texas, United States. She is the second of three daughters. Sister Barbara is five and a half years older; sister Irlene is one and a half years younger. Her mother, Mary, was a homemaker and musician hailing from rural Wayne County, Illinois. Her father Irby was a World War II naval veteran and Texas police officer from Garland County, Arkansas. Irby Mandrell was an accomplished musician and entrepreneur as well. He used his impeccable social skills and knowledge of the music industry to manage all three of his daughters' careers for over three decades.

Although Louise Mandrell never developed the scale of fan base or the worldwide recognition that her older sister Barbara gained in country music, she is still credited as one of country music's more successful female vocalists of the 1980s. With their parents coming from a musical background, Barbara started off working as a singer, and playing the steel guitar and other instruments, and toured with Patsy Cline in the early 1960s. Mandrell learned to play the guitar and bass. Soon, their parents founded the Mandrell Family Band, which toured the United States and Asia.

Barbara's professional recognition in country music in the early 1970s with hits like "Tonight My Baby's Coming Home" and "The Midnight Oil" gave Louise opportunities at success. She started performing in Barbara's band The DoRites in 1969. Her first time in the studio was on the recording "Always Wanting You", a no. 1 hit for country singer-songwriter and Bakersfield sound pioneer Merle Haggard in 1975. In 1978, she signed with Epic Records.

== Music career ==
Mandrell released her first single in 1978, called "Put It On Me", which appeared in the lower reaches of Billboard magazine’s country music singles chart. In 1979, she released her next single, a cover version of "Everlasting Love", another minor country hit. She started singing duets with her husband R.C. Bannon, such as "I Thought You'd Never Ask," which entered the top 50, and a cover of the pop/R&B number 1 song by Peaches & Herb, "Reunited", which went to number 13, her first significant hit. In 1980, following two more solo efforts that did not see the same success, she joined sisters Barbara and Irlene on the TV variety show Barbara Mandrell and the Mandrell Sisters. This show showcased not only her singing, but her multi-instrumental and comedy talents as well. In 1981, she signed with RCA Records. In 1982, Mandrell had two top 40 hits, as well as the top 20 hit "Some of My Best Friends Are Old Songs".

1983 turned out to be her most successful year. She entered the top 15 with "Runaway Heart," and had the two top 10 hits "Save Me" (originally recorded by Northern Irish singer Clodagh Rodgers) and "Too Hot to Sleep". In 1984, Mandrell had two other Top 40 hits, "Goodbye Heartache" and "I'm Not Through Loving You Yet" (co-written by Holly Dunn), and in 1985 the song "I Wanna Say Yes" entered the top 5.

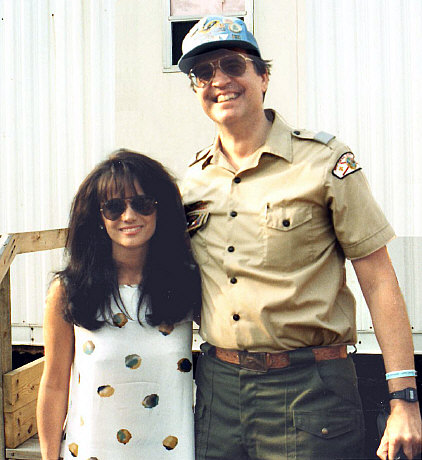
Louise Mandrell and James G. Howes a visiting National Council Representative from the West Central Florida Council at the 1993 National Scout Jamboree, Fort A.P. Hill, Virginia

In 1985, RCA released her first music video for the hit single "Some Girls Have All The Luck", a female-centric cover version of the 1973 hit song recorded by The Persuaders and Rod Stewart.

Mandrell's last studio album Dreamin' was released in 1987, with the single "I Wanna Hear It from Your Lips" and having her last top 40 hit with the single "Do I Have To Say Goodbye". Her last charted single came in 1988 with a cover of the song "As Long As We Got Each Other", a duet with Eric Carmen. The latter was the theme song of the 1985-1992 television sitcom Growing Pains.

RCA and Mandrell parted ways in 1988. During the early 1990s, she released the videos and songs "Jean Paul" (written by R.C. Bannon) and "Down Home Christmas". Both songs are extremely hard to find, and “Jean Paul” appears in Anthology, a 1998 compilation album containing many of her successful hits from the Epic and RCA years, which is also hard to find.

Mandrell was named the official 'Sweetheart of Tennessee.'

She was the unanimous choice of 50 Tennessee city managers -- the first time the city manager's association has so honored anyone. Mandrell accepted 50 inscribed crimson hearts from the managers and, in return, entertained them with a few tunes. She also was named 1981's 'Yellow Rose of Texas' by the Texas state legislature, another first.

== Personal life ==
Her marriage to Ronald Shaw on July 1, 1971, ended in divorce in 1973. She subsequently married Gary Lamar Buck of the country music group The Four Guys on July 23, 1975. They divorced in 1978.

In 1978, Mandrell met R.C. Bannon. They married on February 26, 1979. He co-wrote a few songs for Louise’s sister Barbara. "One of a Kind Pair of Fools" is a 1983 single written by Bannon and John Bettis and recorded by Barbara Mandrell. "Only One Love in My Life," also written by R.C. Bannon and John Bettis, was Ronnie Milsap's 10th number 1.

Mandrell and Bannon adopted Nicole Mandrell Shipley in 1986. The couple divorced in 1991 and she married, for a fourth time, to John Haywood on July 16, 1993.

She became a grandmother for the first time in 2013.

== Theater and writing ==
After leaving RCA Records, Mandrell continued to perform. In 1991, The Nashville Network began re-airing Barbara Mandrell and the Mandrell Sisters.

From 1992 to 1994, she headlined at the 4,000 seat Grand Palace Theatre in Branson, Missouri along with Kenny Rogers. On occasion, she shared the stage with Barbara, Sawyer Brown, Roger Miller, Waylon Jennings, and several other well-known country and pop music entertainers at The Grand Palace.

On September 12, 1997, Mandrell opened her own 1,400-seat theater, The Louise Mandrell Theater in Pigeon Forge, Tennessee, in the heart of the Smoky Mountains in Tennessee, alongside other theaters such as Lee Greenwood's. Mandrell appeared in every performance there and encompassed numerous musical styles, including country, jazz, and big band. It was considered the most attended (non-dinner) show in the Smoky Mountains. The Triumphant Quartet, formerly known as the Integrity Quartet, was the in-house Southern gospel group and back-up singers for Louise. The Louise Mandrell Theater had its last performance, to a sold-out house, on December 31, 2005. Mandrell sold the theater afterwards and it has changed hands twice since. The theater is now home to the "Smoky Mountain Opry."

In 1983, Mandrell co-wrote The Mandrell Family Album with writer Ace Collins. Later, they produced a series of children's books.

In 2012, she performed the title role of "Calamity Jane" at Roger Rocka's Dinner Theatre in Fresno, California through September 16, 2012. Mandrell reprised her role from July until September 15, 2019.

== Later career ==
Mandrell continues to perform at selected special occasions and corporate events. In December 2007, she performed in Washington, D.C., with the National Army band.

Over the Christmas and New Year seasons in 2008 and 2009, Mandrell performed at the Opryland Hotel in Nashville for one month. The multi-instrumental dinner show was entitled "Joy to the World". Mandrell also announced her intention to create a new show in 2010, "The Gift".

In 2009, she signed with Strouadavarious Records and announced her intention to release an album of country classics and a Christmas-themed album.

During 2011 and 2012, Mandrell joined fellow 80s country superstar Lee Greenwood on selected tour dates, including a six-week Branson run at the Welk Resort Theatre from September 12 —- October 22.

Mandrell's final Christmas show at Gaylord Opryland titled "Louise Mandrell's Christmas Dinner Party" took place on November 18 – December 25, 2011.

After 30 years, she released Playing Favorites, her most recent studio album consisting of country standards, on October 4, 2019. It was produced by Buddy Cannon.

Mandrell appeared on the Opry's country classic show in Nashville. The last time she performed on that stage was 50 years ago. The show was broadcast live on the radio program, Opry Country Classics at the Ryman Auditorium, October 3, 2019. She performed on the Grand Ole Opry live from the Ryman on November 30, 2019.

On July 30, 2022, Louise and Irlene joined the special Opry show celebrating the 50th year membership of sister Barbara Mandrell as a Opry member.

Louise once again took to the Opry stage in the Country classics segment on October 13, 2022, December 4, 2022, and March 9, 2023.

== Commercial spokesperson ==
Outside of her musical career, Mandrell served as spokesperson for Sanderson Farms' Miss Goldy Chicken, appearing in several television commercials and print ads for two decades. She also participated in a series of commercials for RC Cola in the mid-1970s, singing the famous "Me and My RC" jingle. Most recently, Mandrell, along with Jimmy Fortune of The Statler Brothers, appeared in a half-hour infomercial for Time-Life, promoting the box set Classic Country (2022 edition).

== Pop culture ==
In the 1980s, the Mandrell sisters were impersonated by the cast of Saturday Night Live on NBC. In 2007, Pam Tillis released a song called "Band in the Window", which name-checks Louise Mandrell ("her name is Louise but not Mandrell, she has 80's hair and fringe"). In 2023, Canadian country artist Lisa Brokop released her female-centric cover version of the George Jones country hit "Who's Gonna Fill Their Shoes" (as "Who's Gonna Fill Their Heels"), and it is where the Mandrell sisters are mentioned among the names of country’s greatest female artists.

== Television appearances ==
- Louise Mandrell appeared in the following TV shows:
  - Super stars and their moms
  - Happy New Year 1985 w/Andy Williams Host
  - The Mike Douglas Show
  - The Today Show
  - 700 club
  - CNN
  - Branson Country Christmas
  - Bright Lights and Country Nights
  - Pop! Goes the Country 1977-78-79*
  - Battle of the Network Stars X 1981
  - Barbara Mandrell and the Mandrell Sisters 1980–1982
  - Hollywood Squares
  - Austin City Limits 1985
  - Hee Haw 1980-82-87-89-90-91 +
  - The Tonight Show 1983–87
  - Crook & Chase most recently 2009 +
  - Children's Miracle Network
  - Lifestyles of the rich and famous
  - Another World 1983
  - Crazy Like a Fox 1986
  - Vicki Lawrence Show
  - Miller and Company (Dan Miller)
  - Prime Time Country +
  - American Almanac with Willard Scott 1995
  - Nashville Now +
  - Louise Mandrell: Diamonds, Gold and Platinum (TV special 1983)
  - Barbara Mandrell Christmas 1986
  - New Country 1987
  - Country Music Spot Light 1994
  - Music City News Awards guest and host
  - Mike Hammer 1987
  - Nashville on the road
  - ACM Awards *
  - CMA Awards *
  - Lee Ann Womack Christmas Special 2003
  - The New Hollywood Squares 1987
  - This Is Your Life 1987
  - Superstars and Their Moms
  - American Revolutions: Country Comedy 2005
  - Intimate Portrait 1999
  - Family Feud
  - Grand Ole Opry *
  - The Tommy Hunter Show Canada
  - The Geraldo Rivera Show
  - The Oprah Winfrey Show *
  - Merry Christmas From the Grand Ole Opry
  - Branson Country Christmas
  - Jerry Reed and Friends 1983
  - Louise Mandrell & Friends Salute the Boy Scouts
  - Hee Haw 20th Anniversary Show
  - Funny Business With Charlie Chase (11/06/91)
  - Christmas in Hollywood
  - CBS' Happy New Year America 1984 & 1985
  - Solid Gold 1985
  - Barbara Mandrell: Country's Do-Right Woman (TV special)
  - National Easter Seal Telethon 1990
  - Ralph Emery 2009
  - Mike Huckabee show 2019
  - Mr Nashville (Larry Ferguson) Web 2020
  - Jerry Lewis telethon
- + was a guest many times

== Discography ==
=== Studio albums ===
Title	Details	Peak positions
Title	Details	US Country
Close Up	Release date: February 1983; Label: RCA Records; Formats: LP, cassette	30
Too Hot to Sleep	Release date: August 1983; Label: RCA Records; Formats: LP, cassette, CD	26
I'm Not Through Loving You Yet	Release date: May 1984; Label: RCA Records; Formats: LP, cassette	54
Maybe My Baby	Release date: May 1985; Label: RCA Records; Formats: LP, cassette, CD	60
Dreamin'	Release date: 1987; Label: RCA Records; Formats: LP, cassette	—
Winter Wonderland	Release date: 1997; Label: Mandrell, inc.; Formats: CD, cassette	—
Personal	Release date: 1998; Label: Mandrell, Inc.; Formats: CD, cassette	—
Playing Favorites	Release date: October 4, 2019; Label: Time–Life; Formats: CD, digital download	—

=== Albums with R. C. Bannon ===
Title	Details	Peak positions
Title	Details	US Country
Inseparable	Release date: 1979; Label: Epic Records; Formats: LP, cassette	—
Love Won't Let Us Let Go	Release date: October 1980; Label: Epic Records; Formats: LP, cassette	—
Me and My R. C.	Release date: 1982; Label: RCA Records; Formats: LP, cassette	20
You're My Super Woman, You're My Incredible Man	Release date: 1982; Label: RCA Records; Formats: LP, cassette	44
"—" denotes releases that did not chart

=== Compilations ===
Title	Details
Louise Mandrell	Release date: July 1981; Label: Epic Records; Formats: LP, cassette
The Best of Louise Mandrell and R. C. Bannon (with R. C. Bannon)	Release date: November 1983; Label: RCA Records; Formats: LP, cassette
Best of Louise Mandrell	Release date: 1987; Label: RCA Records; Formats: LP, cassette
Anthology	Release date: October 13, 1998; Label: Renaissance Records; Formats: CD, cassette
Sisters in Song (with Barbara Mandrell)	Release date: 2001; Label: Sony Special Products; Formats: CD, cassette

=== Singles ===
Year	Single	Peak chart positions		Album
Year	Single	US Country	CAN Country	Album
1978	"Put It on Me"	77	—	Louise Mandrell
1979	"Everlasting Love"	69	—	Louise Mandrell
1979	"I Never Loved Anyone Like I Loved You"	72	—	Louise Mandrell
1980	"Wake Me Up"	63	—	Louise Mandrell
1980	"Beggin' for Mercy"	82	—	Louise Mandrell
1980	"Love Insurance"	61	—	Louise Mandrell
1982	"(You Sure Know Your Way) Around My Heart"	35	40	Me and My R. C.
1982	"Some of My Best Friends Are Old Songs"	20	39	You're My Super Woman, You're My Incredible Man
1982	"Romance"	22	35	You're My Super Woman, You're My Incredible Man
1983	"Save Me"	6	2	Close Up
1983	"Too Hot to Sleep"	10	26	Too Hot to Sleep
1983	"Runaway Heart"	13	10	Too Hot to Sleep
1984	"I'm Not Through Loving You Yet"	7	8	I'm Not Through Loving You Yet
1984	"Goodbye Heartache"	24	29	I'm Not Through Loving You Yet
1984	"This Bed's Not Big Enough"	52	—	I'm Not Through Loving You Yet
1985	"Maybe My Baby"	8	23	Maybe My Baby
1985	"I Wanna Say Yes"	5	3	Maybe My Baby
1985	"Some Girls Have All the Luck"	22	37	Maybe My Baby
1986	"I Wanna Hear It from Your Lips"	35	41	Dreamin'
1987	"Do I Have to Say Goodbye"	28	57	Dreamin'
1987	"Tender Time"	74	—	Dreamin'
1988	"As Long As We Got Each Other" (with Eric Carmen)	51	—	The Best of Louise Mandrell
1991	"Jean Paul"	—	—	—N/a
"—" denotes releases that did not chart

=== Singles with R. C. Bannon ===
Year	Single	Peak chart positions		Album
Year	Single	US Country	CAN Country	Album
1979	"I Thought You'd Never Ask"	46	—	Inseparable
1979	"Reunited"	13	—	Inseparable
1979	"We Love Each Other"	48	—	Inseparable
1981	"Where There's Smoke There's Fire"	35	45	Me and My R. C.
1982	"Our Wedding Band" / "Just Married"	56	45	Me and My R. C.
1983	"Christmas Is Just a Song for Us This Year"	35	—	A Country Christmas
"—" denotes releases that did not chart

=== Music videos ===
Year	Single	Director
1985	"Some Girls Have All the Luck"	Michael Lindsay Hogg
1991	"Jean Paul"	Louise Mandrell
1992	"Down Home Christmas"	Louise Mandrell

== Bibliography ==
- Bufwack, Mary A. (1998). "Louise Mandrell". In The Encyclopedia of Country Music. Paul Kingsbury, Editor. New York: Oxford University Press. p. 324.
