= R.C. Bannon =

American country musician (born 1945)

- Born: Daniel Shipley; May 2, 1945 (age 81)
- Origin: Dallas, Texas, U.S.
- Genres: Country
- Occupation: Singer-songwriter
- Instruments: Vocals, guitar
- Years active: 1950s–present
- Labels: Capitol; Columbia; RCA

R. C. Bannon (born Daniel Shipley; May 2, 1945) is an American country music singer. Active since 1977, Bannon has recorded for the Columbia and RCA labels. He was also married to singer Louise Mandrell from 1979 to 1991, and charted six duets with her in addition to 12 singles of his own. His highest-charting single was his 1979 cover of the Peaches & Herb hit "Reunited," recorded as a duet with Mandrell, that reached number 13 on the country music charts in 1979; his most successful solo single is "Winners and Losers" at number 26. In addition to recording as a solo artist and with Mandrell, Bannon co-wrote songs for Ronnie Milsap, Bobby G. Rice, his former sister-in-law Barbara Mandrell and Steve Azar.

== Biography ==
Bannon was born in Dallas, Texas. There, he sang in his family's church choir as a child, later taking interest in rock music as well as gospel. He also played guitar in several rock bands during the late 1950s and into the 1960s.

In the mid-1960s, Bannnon's family moved to Seattle, Washington, where he performed in nightclubs and sang on a local television program every morning, in addition to working as a disc jockey, for KUUU (today's KLFE), which aired an oldies format at the time. It was during his tenure as a disc jockey that he took the professional name R.C. Bannon. After opening for Marty Robbins, Robbins encouraged him to move to Nashville; Bannon declined at first, and attempted to sign to various labels near California. He briefly signed a contract with Capitol Records, but did not release anything for that label.

== Musical career ==
Finally, in 1976, Bannon moved to Nashville. There, he worked at a discotheque, and later began meeting other singers and songwriters, including one named Harlan Sanders. After signing to a songwriting contract, he had his songs recorded by Robbins, as well as singles released by Bobby G. Rice ("The Softest Touch in Town") and Ronnie Milsap (the Number One "Only One Love in My Life"). In 1977, he signed to Columbia Records, who released his debut album, R.C. Bannon Arrives. Three of the album's cuts made the Hot Country Songs charts, including the No. 33 "It Doesn't Matter Anymore." The album included several songs that Bannon co-wrote, most in collaboration with John Bettis. By 1979, he married Louise Mandrell, with whom he would chart six duets, including the No. 13 "Reunited," his highest-charting single. This led to Academy of Country Music nominations in 1980 for Vocal Group of the Year, Louise also was nominated for Best New Female Vocalist, and R.C. won the Best New Male Vocalist Award. The two released five duets albums between 1979 and 1982. He and Bettis also co-wrote "One of a Kind Pair of Fools" for Louise's sister, Barbara Mandrell. Bannon continued to perform as a musician in Mandrell's show, even after divorcing her in 1991. In the 2000s, Bannon co-wrote Steve Azar's "I Don't Have to Be Me ('Til Monday)." He subsequently married Natalie McGill.

== Discography ==
=== Albums ===
Year	Album information	US Country
1978	R.C. Bannon Arrives: Label: Columbia Records; Released: 1978	—
1979	Inseparable (with Louise Mandrell): Label: Epic Records; Released: December 1979	—
1980	Love Won't Let Us Go (with Louise Mandrell): Label: Epic Records; Released: October 1980	—
1981	Me and My R.C. (with Louise Mandrell): Label: RCA Records; Released: December 1981	20
1982	(You're My) Super Woman/(You're My) Incredible Man (with Louise Mandrell): Label: RCA Records; Released: October 1982	44
1983	The Best (with Louise Mandrell): Label: RCA Records; Released: November 1983	—

=== Singles ===
Year	Single	Chart Positions	Album
Year	Single	US Country	Album
1977	"Southbound"	99	R.C. Bannon Arrives
1977	"Rainbows and Horseshoes"	90	R.C. Bannon Arrives
1977	"It Doesn't Matter Anymore"	33	R.C. Bannon Arrives
1978	"(The Truth Is) We're Livin' a Lie"	64	R.C. Bannon Arrives
1978	"Somebody's Gonna Do It Tonight"	64	singles only
1979	"Winners and Losers"	26	singles only
1980	"Lovely Lonely Lady"	65	singles only
1980	"If You're Serious About Cheatin'"	61	singles only
1980	"Never Be Anyone Else"	36	singles only
1982	"Til Something Better Comes Along"	46	Me and My R.C.

=== Duets with Louise Mandrell ===
Year	Single	Chart Positions		Album
Year	Single	US Country	CAN Country	Album
1979	"I Thought You'd Never Ask"	46	—	Inseparable
1979	"Reunited"	13	—	Inseparable
1979	"We Love Each Other"	48	—	Inseparable
1981	"Where There's Smoke There's Fire"	35	45	Me and My R.C.
1982	"Our Wedding Band"/"Just Married"	56	45	Me and My R.C.

=== Other charted songs ===
Year	Single	Chart Positions	Album
Year	Single	US Country	Album
1982	"Christmas Is Just a Song for Us This Year" (Note: Single was a Double A-side with "Christmas in Dixie" by Alabama.) (w/ Louise Mandrell)	35	Country Christmas

== Awards and nominations ==
Year	Organization	Award	Nominee/Work	Result
1980	Academy of Country Music Awards	Top New Male Vocalist	R.C. Bannon	Won
1980	Academy of Country Music Awards	Top Vocal Group	R.C. Bannon & Louise Mandrell	Nominated
1982	Academy of Country Music Awards	Top Vocal Duet	R.C. Bannon & Louise Mandrell	Nominated
