= The Essential George Duke =

Greatest hits album by George Duke
- Released: 2004
- Length: 2:36:32
- Label: Legacy Recordings

George Duke chronology
Face the Music (2002)	The Essential George Duke (2004)	Duke (2005)

The Essential George Duke is a compilation album by the American keyboardist George Duke, released by Legacy Recordings in 2004. The album covers Duke's From Me to You (1977) to his Stanley Clarke collaboration 3 (1990). The album also features 2 12" single mixes, with the first of the two being labeled as a "special disco version".

== Reception ==
Professional ratings
Review scores
Source	Rating
AllMusic	3/5 stars
The Encyclopedia of Popular Music	4/5 stars
The Guardian	3/5 stars
PopMatters	7/10

Writing for AllMusic, critic Thom Jurek wrote that "fans who abandoned Duke during these years will find little to interest them, but those out there searching used record stores for classic funk and disco recordings will find this a treasure trove of tough, slick groove". PopMatters critic Quentin B. Huff called it a "step in a righteous direction", noting it "reintroduces us to Duke’s exceptional hybrid of disco, funk, jazz, and soul".

== Track listing ==
All tracks are written by George Duke, except where noted.

Disc one
No.	Title	Writer(s)	Original album	Length
1.	"Scuse Me Miss"		From Me to You, 1977	3:34
2.	"Reach for It"		Reach for It, 1977	4:54
3.	"Starting Again"		Don't Let Go, 1978	4:32
4.	"Dukey Stick"		Don't Let Go	6:08
5.	"Movin' On"		Don't Let Go	4:25
6.	"Party Down"		Follow the Rainbow, 1979	3:09
7.	"Say That You Will"		Follow the Rainbow	3:06
8.	"Funkin' for the Thrill"	Byron Miller	Follow the Rainbow	4:50
9.	"Summer Breezin'"		A Brazilian Love Affair, 1980	4:48
10.	"Cravo E Canela"	Milton Nascimento; Ronaldo Bastos	A Brazilian Love Affair	3:05
11.	"Up from the Sea it Arose and Ate Rio in One Swift Bite"		A Brazilian Love Affair	5:22
12.	"Brazilian Love Affair"		A Brazilian Love Affair	7:22
13.	"Every Little Step I Take"		Master of the Game, 1979	3:49
14.	"I Want You All for Myself"		Master of the Game	6:38
15.	"Sweet Baby"		The Clarke/Duke Project, 1981	3:47
16.	"I Just Want to Love You"		The Clarke/Duke Project	3:52
17.	"You"	Cedric Martin; Felton Clyde Pilate II	Dream On, 1982	4:38

Disc two
No.	Title	Writer(s)	Original album	Length
1.	"Shine On"		Dream On	5:13
2.	"Ride On Love"		Dream On	5:25
3.	"Son of Reach for It (The Funky Dream)"	Duke; Byron Miller; Leon Chancler	Dream On	4:25
4.	"Every Reason to Smile"		The Clarke/Duke Project II, 1983	4:22
5.	"Heroes"		The Clarke Duke Project II	4:52
6.	"The Good Times"		The Clarke/Duke Project II	4:39
7.	"Overture"		Guardian of the Light, 1983	1:38
8.	"Reach Out"		Guardian of the Light	4:58
9.	"Give Me Your Love"		Guardian of the Light	4:20
10.	"Silly Fightin'"		Guardian of the Light	5:09
11.	"Got to Get Back to Love"		Rendezvous, 1984	4:20
12.	"She Can Wait Forever"	Geoffrey Leib	Rendezvous	4:01
13.	"Secret Rendezvous"	Jerry Knight	Rendezvous	4:52
14.	"Mothership Connection"		The Clarke/Duke Project III, 1990	5:10
Total length:				2:36:32

Bonus material
No.	Title	Length
1.	"Dukey Stick 12"" (Special disco version)	8:05
2.	"Reach Out! 12""	6:52
