= Josie James =

American singer

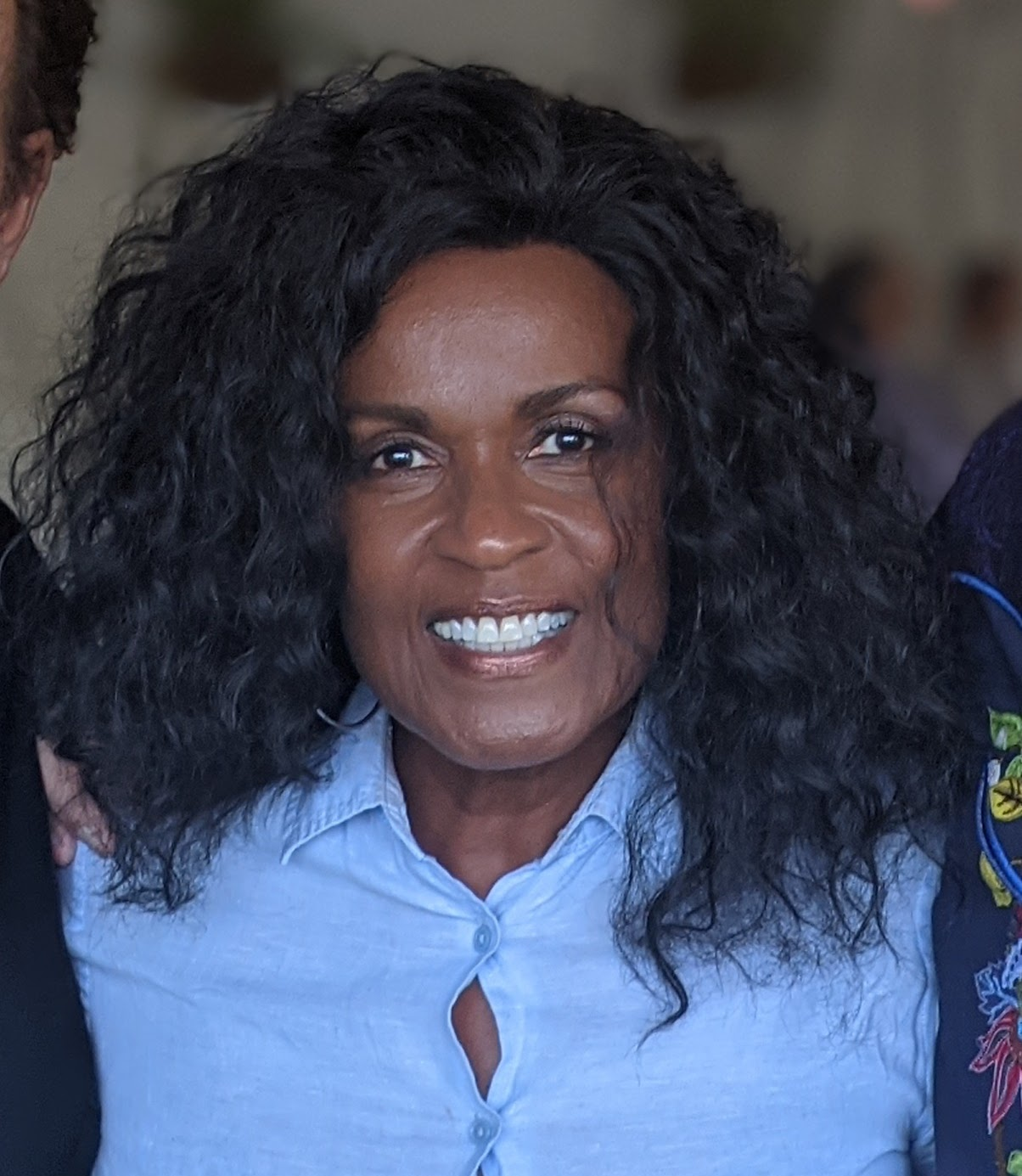

Background information
- Born: Josephine James; Los Angeles, California, U.S.
- Genres: R&B; pop; disco; dance; rock; funk; gospel; jazz; Big band
- Occupations: Singer; songwriter; musician; recording artist; model; voice-over
- Website: josiejamesmusic.com

Josephine James is a Grammy-nominated singer, songwriter, and recording artist. James is best known for her performances on Burt Bacharach's world tours, such as her feature song "Anyone Who Had a Heart". James is also the lead vocalist of George Duke, the band. James' co-wrote her solo albums Candles, Songcity, Hit Factory, and That Jazz with producer Nigel Martinez. James and Martinez also collaborated to release several UK singles: "Dance You Up," "Call Me (When You Need My Love)," "Now or Never," and "It's Up To Me." Her performance on "Street Life" from the album Royal Jam with The Crusaders, B.B. King, and The London Philharmonic Orchestra, recorded live at Royal Festival Hall, was nominated for a Grammy.

Some of her performances include: The International Tribute for a Free South Africa for Nelson Mandela at London's Wembley Arena with George Duke, for an audience of 100,000 people and television audiences worldwide; The Hollywood Bowl as featured artist at the JVC Jazz Festival with guitarist Earl Klugh; several television appearances in England, such as the Jools Holland Show, Selena Scott, London's Jazz Café, and BBC's The One Show; and appearances at North Sea Jazz Festival, Laguna Beach's Festival of the Arts' series Pageant of the Masters, Tokyo Jazz Festival, The Iveagh Gardens, Dublin, Playboy Jazz Festival, Billboard Live, Dick Clark's American Bandstand, and the Jerry Lewis Telethon.

== Early life ==
James was born to Joseph and Ellen James in Los Angeles, California. Her debut performance was at age eight with her father's band at a grocery store opening. She sang "Poison Ivy" while holding her favorite doll. She attended Nevin Avenue Elementary School, participating in school plays and musicals and enrolling in dancing and acting classes at the Ross Snyders Recreation Center. After moving to Compton, James attended Vanguard Junior High School, where she participated in choir, chorus, and musicals including The King and I and Oklahoma! From there she went on to Centennial High School, where she organized dances, concerts, and events as vice president of the socialite "Tomahawk Club," participated in talent shows, and was voted Most Talented Senior Girl.

At age 18, after high school graduation, James, entered KGFJ's Soul Search Contest with "Somebody Loves You" by The Delfonics, winning fourth place out of 400 contestants, all of whom were professional musicians. Following this, James was approached by Motown Records, Barry White, and Wayne Henderson, but turned them down to attend college at California State Polytechnic University in Pomona, California. James received her Bachelor of Science in mass communications arts, with a focus on journalism, television production, radio programming, and announcing. While attending, James won grand prize winner First Place Best Female Solo in the Spring Sing talent contest for all four consecutive years.

== Career ==
=== 1975–1976: Patrice Rushen and Stevie Wonder ===
James' career began in earnest in 1975, when Patrice Rushen wrote "What's the Story" for James to sing on her album Before the Dawn with Prestige Records.

In 1976, Stevie Wonder asked James to record "Another Star", the hit single from his album Songs in the Key of Life. The album reached #1 on Billboard's Top R&B/HipHop chart that year, and "Another Star" reached #2 on Billboard's Dance Club Songs chart. She went on to record on his albums Journey Through the Secret Life of Plants and Hotter Than July.

=== 1977–2013: George Duke and more ===
In 1977, James was recommended to George Duke by Leon "Ndugu" Chancler. James became lead vocalist and percussionist in the original George Duke Band, where she met band members Sheila E., Byron Miller, Sharon Muffy Hendrix, and Charles Icarus Johnson. In 1978, James recorded the album Don't Let Go, including the single "Moving On" with Napoleon Brock. The album reached #5 on Billboard charts. James continued to perform and record with Duke until his death in 2013. Her last recording with Duke was "Jazzmatazz" from Duke's final album Dreamweaver. In addition to Don't Let Go and Dreamweaver, James' other recordings with Duke include: Dukey Treats, Cool, Is Love Enough?, Illusions, Night After Night, 101 North, George Duke, Rendezvous, Follow the Rainbow, Master of the Game, and A Brazilian Love Affair.

In 1984, James sang vocals with Earth, Wind & Fire singer Philip Bailey on his albums Chinese Wall, featuring Phil Collins, and Triumph. James toured Japan with Bailey featuring James on lead vocals for UK single "Dance You Up."

In 1988, James recorded her first of three albums with Al Jarreau, with whom she continued to perform occasionally until his death.

In 1993, James sang backup vocals with Whitney Houston on The Bodyguard Tour.

=== 1998–present: Burt Bacharach and later career ===
James has toured with Burt Bacharach, who noticed her from her solo album Candles, from 1998 to the present day, including in the United States, the United Kingdom, Japan, Australia, New Zealand, Europe, South America, and Canada, where she has received several standing ovations for her rendition of Anyone Who Had a Heart. James headlined with the San Diego Symphony in 2014. James has recorded on Bacharach's albums Here I Am, At This Time, and Live at the Sydney Opera House with the Sydney Symphony Orchestra.

James has developed her career as a jazz vocalist with the Marlonius Jazz Orchestra (MJO). In 2019, James was featured with the orchestra five times - at the Festival of the Arts' series Pageant of the Masters in Laguna Beach, Feinstein's at Vitello's in March and July, and at the Blue Whale Jazz Club in October and March. James debuted with the MJO at a private ceremony at Ambassador Auditorium in 2016.

== Solo work ==
James has recorded several solo albums: Hit Factory, That Jazz, Candles, Morning Glow, Win Your Love, and Songcity. She has also recorded solo singles "Dance You Up," "Call Me (When You Need My Love), Now or Never, and It's Up to Me. Her solo work has been in close collaboration with co-writer, producer, vocalist, and multi-instrumentalist Nigel Martinez.

== Discography ==
Solo artist albums	
Hit Factory U.S.A. (2016)	1. All Day, All Night; 2. World Go Round; 3. Take It to the Limit; 4. Don't Give Up; 5. Be Your Friend; 6. You're so Good; 7. All over Me; 8. I Love You Babe; 9. Lifestyle; 10. You're a Winner
That Jazz (2015)	1. Anyone Who Had a Heart; 2. Coming Back to Your Love; 3. That Jazz; 4. The Fantasy; 5. La Musica; 6. Morning Glow; 7. Win Your Love; 8. Out of Time; 9. My Time; 10. I Wanna Be Your Friend
Candles (1996)	1. Tell Me; 2. I Don't Wanna Lose It; 3. Candles; 4. Looking For A Man; 5. Win Your Love; 6. All Over Me; 7. Take A Little Time; 8. After the Love; 9. Cry; 10. This Time It's Love; 11. Back In My Arms
Songcity (1991)	1. We Can Make It; 2. Love in the Making; 3. You Are All I Need; 4. When Will It Be; 5. Let's Do It; 6. Oh Yeah!; 7. Because We Said Goodbye; 8. Hope for the Future; 9. Tropical Freeway; 10. Take What You Get; 11. The Second Coming; 12. Celebrate
Solo artist singles	
"La Musica" (2017)
"Morning Glow" (1992)
"Win Your Love" (1992)
"Dance You Up" (1986)
"Call Me (When You Need My Love)" (1985)
"Now or Never" (1982)
"It's Up To Me" (1981)

Artist	Albums	Track(s)
George Duke	Dreamweaver (2013)	"Say Hello" "This Lovin'"
George Duke	Dukey Treats (2008)	"Mercy"* "Dukey Treats" "Everyday Hero" "I Tried to Tell You"
George Duke	Cool (2000)	"If You Will"
George Duke	This is Jazz 37 (1998)	"Summer Breezin'"
George Duke	Is Love Enough? (1997)	
George Duke	Illusions (1995)	"Money"
George Duke	Night After Night (1989)	"Jazzmatazz"
George Duke	101 North (1988)	"So Easy"*
George Duke	George Duke (1986)	
George Duke	Rendezvous (1984)	"Secret Rendezvous"
George Duke	Follow the Rainbow (1979)	"Party Down"* "Say That You Will" "Funkin' For The Thrill"* "I Am For Real" "Corine"* "Pluck"
George Duke	Master of the Game (1979)	"Look What You Find"*
George Duke	Don't Let Go (1978)	"Movin' On"* "The Way I Feel"* "Morning Sun"* "Don't Let Go"* "Dukey Stick"*
George Duke	A Brazilian Love Affair (1979)	"I Need You Now"
Stevie Wonder	Hotter than July (1980)	"Happy Birthday"
Stevie Wonder	Journey Through the Secret Life of Plants (1979)	"Race Babbling" "Kese Ye Lolo De Ye"
Stevie Wonder	Songs in the Key of Life (1976)	"Another Star" "Contusion"
Burt Bacharach	At This Time (2005)	"Fade Away"
Burt Bacharach	Here I Am (2003)	"Anyone Who Had a Heart"
Patrice Rushen	Pizzazz (1979)	"Haven't You Heard"
Patrice Rushen	Shout It Out (1977)	"Let There Be Funk"
Patrice Rushen	Before the Dawn (1975)	"What's the Story"*
Stanley Clarke	Hideaway (1986)	"Listen to the Beat of Your Heart"
Stanley Clarke	Rocks, Pebbles and Sand (1980)	"We Supply"
Ndugu Chancler	Old Friends New Friends (1989)	
Ndugu Chancler	Do I Make You Feel Better? (1980)	
Al Jarreau	Tomorrow Today (2000)	
Al Jarreau	So Good (1996)	"So Good"
Al Jarreau	Heart's Horizon (1988)	"So Good"
The Crusaders	Royal Jam (1981)	"Street Life" "Burning Up the Carnival"
The Crusaders	Soul Shadows (1980)	"Burning Up the Carnival (Live Version)"
Peabo Bryson	All My Love (1989)	
Peabo Bryson	Straight from the Heart (1984)	"I Get Nervous"
Randy Hall	Love You Like a Stranger (1988)	"Empty"
Randy Hall	I Belong to You (1984)	
Earth, Wind & Fire	Heritage (1990)	"Anything You Want"
Dee Dee Bridgewater	Bad for Me (1998)	"Don't Say It (If You Don't Mean It)"
Nigel Martinez	So Good (1998)	
Philip Bailey	Chinese Wall (1984)	"Walking on the Chinese Wall"
Lou Rawls	Close Company (1984)	
Patti Austin	Patti Austin (1984)	"I've Got My Heart Set On You"
Leon Haywood	It's Me Again (1983)	
Jeffrey Osborne	Stay With Me Tonight (1983)	"Forever Mine"
Wham!	Fantastic (1983)	"Young Guns (Go For It)"
Light of the World	Check Us Out (1982)	
Billy Ocean	Inner Feelings (1982)	
Heaven 17	Penthouse and Pavement (1981)	
The Brothers Johnson	Light Up the Night (1980)	"Stomp!" "You Make Me Want to Wiggle" "Light Up the Night"
Joe Sample	Voices in the Rain (1980)	"Burnin' Up the Carnival"
La Toya Jackson	La Toya Jackson (1980)	"A Taste of You (Is a Taste of Love)"
The Jacksons	Triumph (1980)	"Can You Feel It"

* = lead vocals
