= The Clarke/Duke Project II =

Studio album by Stanley Clarke & George Duke
- Released: 1983
- Studios: Fantasy, Berkeley, California; Soundcastle
- Genres: Jazz-funk; jazz fusion
- Length: 38:17
- Label: Epic
- Producers: George Duke; Stanley Clarke

Stanley Clarke & George Duke chronology
The Clarke/Duke Project (1981)	The Clarke/Duke Project II (1983)	3 (1990)

Stanley Clarke chronology
Let Me Know You (1982)	The Clarke/Duke Project II (1983)	Time Exposure (1984)

George Duke chronology
Guardian of the Light (1983)	The Clarke/Duke Project II (1983)	Rendezvous (1984)

Professional ratings
Review scores
Source	Rating
AllMusic	1.5/5 stars
The Encyclopedia of Popular Music	4/5 stars

The Clarke/Duke Project II is the second collaborative album by American musicians Stanley Clarke and George Duke. It was released in 1983 through Epic Records. The album peaked at number 146 on the Billboard 200 and at number 44 on the Top R&B/Hip-Hop Albums chart.

== Track listing ==
No.	Title	Writer(s)	Length
1.	"Put It on the Line"	Stanley Clarke	4:22
2.	"Heroes"	George Duke	4:53
3.	"Try Me Baby"	George Duke	3:40
4.	"Every Reason to Smile"	George Duke; Stanley Clarke	4:21
5.	"Great Danes"	George Duke; Stanley Clarke	3:48
6.	"The Good Times"	George Duke; Stanley Clarke	4:39
7.	"You're Gonna Love It"	George Duke; Stanley Clarke	5:02
8.	"Trip You in Love"	Kenneth Ann Parker; Timothy M. Kenelick	3:26
9.	"Atlanta"	Stanley Clarke	4:06
Total length:			38:17

== Personnel ==
- Stanley Clarke – bass, cello, guitar, piccolo, vocals
- George Duke – keyboards, vocals
- Clydene Jackson – vocals
- Lynn Davis – vocals
- Portia Griffin – vocals
- Howard Hewett – vocals
- Jeffrey Osborne – vocals
- Sylvia St. James – vocals
- Deborah Thomas – vocals
- Debra Starr – vocals
- Julia Tillman – vocals
- Maxine Willard Water – vocals
- Cruz Baca Sembello – background vocals
- Billy Cobham – drums
- John "J.R." Robinson – drums
- Narada Michael Walden – drums
- Alphonso Johnson – bass
- Paulinho Da Costa – percussion
- Michael Sembello – guitar
- George Del Barrio – string arrangements
- Allan Harshman – strings
- Barbara Hunter – strings
- Bonnie Douglas – strings
- Brenton Banks – strings
- Dave Schwartz – strings
- Dixie Blackstone – strings
- Edward Green – strings
- Gareth "Garry" Nuttycombe – strings
- Harry Bluestone – strings
- Jan Kelley – strings
- Katie Kirkpatrick – strings
- Murray Adler – strings
- Nathan Ross – strings
- Pat Johnson – strings
- Paul Shure – strings
- Ray Kelley – strings
- Reg Hill – strings
- Robert Sushel – strings
- Ronald Cooper – strings
- Rollice Dale – strings
- William Criss – oboe

Technical

- Michael Herbick – engineer
- Mitch Gibson – engineer
- Nick Spigel – engineer
- Tom Perry – engineer
- Eric Zobler – engineer
- Tommy Vicari – engineer, mixer
- Brian Gardner – mastering
- Vic Anesini – mastering

== Chart history ==
Chart (1983)	Peak position
US Billboard 200	146
US Top R&B/Hip-Hop Albums (Billboard)	44
