= Master of the Game (George Duke album) =

1979 studio album by George Duke

Studio album by George Duke
- Released: 1979
- Studios: Westlake Recording Studios (Los Angeles, California)
- Genres: Crossover jazz; funk
- Length: 42:10
- Label: Epic
- Producer: George Duke

George Duke chronology
Follow the Rainbow (1979)	Master of the Game (1979)	A Brazilian Love Affair (1980)

Singles from Master of the Game
- 1. "I Want You for Myself" Released: 1979; 2. "Every Little Step I Take / Games" Released: 1979

Master of the Game is the thirteenth studio album by American keyboardist and record producer George Duke. It was released in 1979 through Epic Records. Recording sessions for this full-length album took place at Westlake Recording Studios in Los Angeles. The album features contributions from vocalists Lynn Davis, Josie James and Napoleon Murphy Brock, guitarists David Myles, Ray Obiedo and Roland Bautista, bassists Byron Miller and Freddie Washington, drummer Ricky Lawson, percussionist Sheila Escovedo, trombonist Bill Reichenbach, trumpeters Jerry Hey and Gary Grant, and saxophonist Gary Herbig.

== Background ==
In creating of Master of the Game, Duke used a variety of keyboard instruments viz. Fender Rhodes electric piano, Yamaha Acoustic piano, Yamaha Electric grand piano, Wurlitzer electric piano, Hohner Clavinet D6, ARP Odyssey and ARP String Ensemble synthesizers, Minimoog, Oberheim synthesizer, Sequential Circuits Prophet-5 and Crumar synthesizer. David Myles played six and twelve-string acoustic guitars, electric guitar and sitar. The album was mastered by Brian Gardner at Allen Zentz Studio in Los Angeles.

== Release ==
The album peaked at number 125 on the US Billboard 200 album chart and at number 18 on the Top R&B/Hip-Hop Albums chart. Master of the Game spawned two singles: "I Want You for Myself" and "Every Little Step I Take". Its lead single, "I Want You for Myself" featuring Lynn Davis, reached number 23 on both the Hot R&B/Hip-Hop Songs and the Dance Club Songs charts.

The opening of the track "Look What You Find" was used as the theme music for Connecticut Public Television's identification logo in the 1980s.

The track "I Love You More" would later be sampled years later by Daft Punk, for their hit single "Digital Love".

== Critical reception ==
Professional ratings
Review scores
Source	Rating
AllMusic	3/5 stars
Record Mirror	4/5 stars

Alex Henderson of AllMusic claimed, "On the whole, this album isn't in a class with Reach for It, Don't Let Go, or Follow the Rainbow, which are arguably his most essential R&B-oriented albums. But it has more pluses than minuses and is worth having in your collection if you're a serious fans of Duke's late 1970s/early 1980s output."

Paul Sexton of Record Mirror wrote that "the new set boasts a pleasant blend of straight funk with 'Games', hints of rock inflection on 'In the Distance', experimental jazz-funk on 'The Alien Challenges the Stick' (part of an even longer title) and clean, likeable soul-pop."

== Track listing ==
No.	Title	Writer(s)	Length
1.	"Look What You Find"	George Duke	4:44
2.	"Every Little Step I Take"	George Duke	3:49
3.	"Games"	George Duke; Sheila Escovedo	3:14
4.	"I Want You for Myself" (featuring Lynn Davis)	George Duke	6:38
5.	"In the Distance"	George Duke	2:20
6.	"I Love You More"	George Duke	3:06
7.	"Dog-Man"	George Duke	4:40
8.	"Everybody's Talkin'"	George Duke	4:19
9.	"Part 1 - The Alien Challenges the Stick / Part 2 - The Alien Succumbs to the Macho Intergalactic Funkativity of the Funkblasters"	George Duke; Ricky Lawson; Byron Miller; David Myles	9:20
Total length:			42:10

== Personnel ==
- George Duke – vocals, acoustic piano, electric grand piano, electric pianos, clavinet, organ, synthesizers, bells
- David Myles – acoustic guitar, electric guitar, 12-string acoustic guitar, sitar
- Ray Obiedo – guitars (3)
- Roland Bautista – guitars (8)
- Byron Lee Miller – bass (1, 2, 4–9)
- "Ready" Freddie Washington – bass (3)
- Ricky Lawson – drums (1, 2, 4–9)
- Sheila Escovedo – drums (3), percussion
- Gary Herbig – alto saxophone, tenor saxophone, piccolo flute
- Bill Reichenbach Jr. – trombone, bass trombone
- Jerry Hey – trumpet, flugelhorn
- Gary Grant – trumpet (7)
- Napoleon Murphy Brock – vocals
- Lynn Davis – vocals, lead vocals (4)
- Josie James – vocals

=== Production ===
- George Duke – producer, arrangements
- Tommy Vicari – engineer
- Dave Rideau – tracking (3)
- Kerry McNabb – tracking (8)
- Erik Zobler – assistant engineer
- Mitch Gibson – assistant engineer
- Brian Gardner – mastering
- David Fisher – cover artwork

== Chart history ==
Chart (1979)	Peak position
US Billboard 200	125
US Top R&B/Hip-Hop Albums (Billboard)	18
