= Dukey Treats =

2008 studio album by George Duke

Studio album by George Duke
- Released: August 26, 2008
- Studio: Le Gonks West (Los Angeles, California)
- Genre: Jazz-funk; jazz
- Length: 1:04:28
- Label: Big Piano Music; Heads Up International
- Producer: Dave Love (exec.); George Duke (also exec.)

George Duke chronology
In a Mellow Tone (2006)	Dukey Treats (2008)	Deja Vu (2010)

Professional ratings
Review scores
Source	Rating
All About Jazz	4.5/5 stars
AllMusic	3/5 stars
JazzTimes	(favourable)
Chicago Sun-Times	3/5 stars

Dukey Treats is the 29th studio album by American keyboardist and record producer George Duke. This album was released on August 26, 2008, through BPM Records under exclusive license to Heads Up International. Dukey Treats peaked at No. 3 on the US Billboard Top Jazz Albums and No. 29 on the Top Independent Albums charts.

== Critical reception ==
Brian Soergel of JazzTimes favourably found "If you thought George Duke’s trad-jazz In a Mellow Tone was the best thing he’s ever done, Dukey Treats probably isn’t your thing. But if you smile every time Duke’s “Sweet Baby” comes on the radio and shake your skunk rump when Sir Duke launches into “Dukey Stick” at a show, this is your thang."

Thom Jurek of Allmusic claimed, "On Dukey Treats, George Duke returns to the big FONK of the late '70s and early '80s...Dukey Treats is a mixed bag, but it works well. It's the brightest and most enjoyable (as in "fun") record Duke has done in at least a decade."

The Evening Standard praised the album saying "AURAL nutrition for the mind, body and soul is how synth virtuoso and allround groovemaster George Duke describes his latest album and he's not wrong. A crowd-pleaser with a warm personality, he also has a serious side, and the dozen new songs here show the breadth of his artistry and awareness."

Jeff Johnson of the Chicago Sun-Times declared "Keyboardist George Duke describes his "Dukey Treats" as "aural nutrients for the mind, body and soul." He clearly has set out to make his new funk album as much fun as possible for musicians and listeners alike, and he succeeds...A distinctive vocalist in his own right, Duke gets plenty of help courtesy of guests Jonathan Butler, Howard Hewett and Teena Marie. But the real pleasure of this jazz-funk workout is in the groove, and Sir Duke lays it down along with bassist Christian McBride, percussionist Sheila E and a red-hot horn section."

== Track listing ==
All tracks are written by George Duke.

No.	Title	Length
1.	"Everyday Hero"	5:04
2.	"I Tried to Tell You"	4:44
3.	"A Fonk Tail"	4:05
4.	"Dukey Treats"	6:53
5.	"Listen Baby"	5:35
6.	"Mercy"	5:38
7.	"Somebody Laid It on Us"	4:50
8.	"Creepin'"	5:01
9.	"Right on Time"	5:28
10.	"Sudan"	5:10
11.	"Are You Ready"	4:32
12.	"Images of Us"	7:24

== Personnel ==
Musicians

- George Duke – Rhodes electric piano (1, 2, 5, 6, 9–12), clavinet (1, 2, 4, 6), synthesizers (1–4, 6, 7, 9–12), vibraphone (5), acoustic piano (7, 9, 11), keyboards (8)
- Jef Lee Johnson – guitars (1, 2, 4–6, 8–10, 12), acoustic guitar (5)
- John "Jubu" Smith – guitars (5, 7, 11)
- Ray Fuller – guitars (5, 9)
- Wah Wah Watson – guitars (6)
- Michael Manson – bass (1, 2, 10, 12)
- Byron Miller – bass (4, 6)
- Larry Kimpel – bass (5, 9, 11)
- Christian McBride – acoustic bass (8)
- Wayman Tisdale – bass fills (9)
- Ronald Bruner Jr. – drums (1, 2, 10, 12)
- Leon "Ndugu" Chancler – drums (4, 6)
- Vinnie Colaiuta – drums (5, 7)
- "Little" John Roberts – drums (8)
- Teddy Campbell – drums (9, 11)
- Sheila E. – percussion (1, 4, 6, 11)
- Lenny Castro – percussion (5, 7)
- Everette Harp – alto saxophone (1, 2, 4, 6, 11, 12)
- Dan Higgins – tenor saxophone (1, 2, 11)
- Larry Williams – tenor saxophone (4, 6, 12)
- Kamasi Washington – tenor sax solo (6)
- Reggie Young – trombone (1, 2, 11)
- Isley Remington – trombone (4, 6, 12)
- Michael "Patches" Stewart – trumpet (1, 2, 4–6, 11, 12)

Vocalists

- George Duke – vocals (1, 2, 4–10), narration (3), lead vocals (11)
- Rachelle Ferrell – vocals (1, 9)
- Josie James – backing vocals (1), vocals (2, 4, 6, 8), rap (6, 8)
- Lori Perry – vocals (1, 8), rap (8)
- Fred White – backing vocals (1), vocals (11)
- DeeDee Foster – vocals (2)
- Jim Gilstrap – vocals (2, 9)
- Napoleon Murphy Brock – vocals (4, 6), rap (6)
- Darrell Cox – rap (4)
- Lynn Davis – vocals (4, 6), rap (6)
- Leon "Ndugu" Chancler – rap (6, 8), vocals (8)
- Sheila E. – rap (6)
- Byron Miller – rap (6, 8), vocals (8)
- Corine Duke – voice (7)
- Kenya Hathaway – vocals (8), rap (8)
- Howard Hewett – vocals (8), rap (8)
- "Little" John Roberts – vocals (8)
- Jonathan Butler – vocals (10)
- Teena Marie – vocals (10)
- Fiona Frawley – foreign correspondent (10)
- Nigel Martinez – foreign correspondent (10)
- Terry Dexter – vocals (11)
- Lynne Fiddmont – vocals (11)

Production

- George Duke – executive producer, producer
- Dave Love – executive producer
- Erik Zobler – recording, mixing, mastering
- Thai Long Ly – assistant engineer
- Andrew Papastephanou – technician
- Studio Zed Mastering (Porter Ranch, California) – mastering location
- Corine Duke – production coordinator
- Natalie Singer – product manager
- Randall Moses – art direction, design
- Bobby Holland – photography
- Chaz Bowie – photo session stills
- Lalette Littlejohn – hair stylist, make-up
- Jim Wilson – piano tuner

== Chart history ==
Chart (2008)	Peak position
US Billboard 200	192
US Top Jazz Albums (Billboard)	3
US Independent Albums (Billboard)	29
