= Pageant of Our Lord =

Arts pageant in California

The Pageant of Our Lord is an arts pageant produced by Rolling Hills Covenant Church in Rolling Hills Estates, California. The pageant, started in 1986, presents the life of Christ through living art accompanied with narration, a choir, and an orchestra. Performances are held in the weeks leading up to Easter. Since its founding, the show is believed to have been seen by over 160,000 people.

Each year the pageant presents 14 works of art, and over the years the pageant has re-created over 40 art pieces that are stored and rotated through yearly. Works of art recreated in the pageant include Leonardo da Vinci's The Last Supper and Michelangelo's Pietà which, due to popular demand, are included every year. Music to accompany the art includes works such as Handel's Hallelujah Chorus, Modest Mussorgsky's "The Great Gate of Kiev" from Pictures at an Exhibition, and Martin Luther's "A Mighty Fortress is Our God".

The pageant was founded by Music Director David Halverson, who was inspired after seeing a performance of Pageant of the Masters in Laguna Beach, California, to transpose and produce a version with a Christian focus. The first production featured 6 works of art and man challenges to the founders of the pageant.

== See also ==
- Tableau vivant
