= The Clarke/Duke Project =

1981 studio album by Stanley Clarke and George Duke

Studio album by Stanley Clarke & George Duke
- Released: April 9, 1981
- Studios: Fantasy Studios (Berkeley); Westlake (Hollywood); Le Gonks West (Hollywood); A&M (Hollywood)
- Genre: Jazz-funk
- Length: 36:21
- Label: Epic
- Producers: George Duke; Stanley Clarke

Stanley Clarke & George Duke chronology
The Clarke/Duke Project (1981)	The Clarke/Duke Project II (1983)

Singles from The Clarke/Duke Project
- 1. "Sweet Baby" Released: 1981; 2. "Louie Louie" Released: 1981

Stanley Clarke chronology
Rocks, Pebbles and Sand (1980)	The Clarke/Duke Project (1981)	Let Me Know You (1982)

George Duke chronology
A Brazilian Love Affair (1980)	The Clarke/Duke Project (1981)	Dream On (1982)

Professional ratings
Review scores
Source	Rating
AllMusic	1.5/5 stars

The Clarke/Duke Project was the first collaborative album by American jazz musicians Stanley Clarke and George Duke released in 1981 on Epic Records. The Clark/Duke project peaked at No. 33 on the Billboard 200 and at No. 7 on the Top R&B/Hip-Hop Albums chart.

== Background ==
The main recording sessions took place at Studio D of Fantasy Studios in Berkeley, California with additional recording at Le Gonks West, Westlake Studios and A&M Studios in Hollywood, California.

The album's lead single, "Sweet Baby", peaked at No. 19 on the Hot 100.

== Critical reception ==
The Clarke/Duke Project was nominated for Best R&B Performance by a Duo or Group at the 24th Annual Grammy Awards.

== Track listing ==
No.	Title	Lyrics	Music	Length
1.	"Wild Dog"		George Duke; Stanley Clarke	3:29
2.	"Louie Louie"	Richard Berry	Richard Berry	5:05
3.	"Sweet Baby"	George Duke	George Duke	3:45
4.	"I Just Want to Love You"	Stanley Clarke	Stanley Clarke	3:50
5.	"Never Judge a Cover By Its Book"		Stanley Clarke	1:42
6.	"Let's Get Started"		George Duke; Stanley Clarke	3:56
7.	"Winners"	Stanley Clarke	Stanley Clarke	4:01
8.	"Touch and Go"	Allee Willis	Stanley Clarke; George Duke	4:36
9.	"Finding My Way"	George Duke	George Duke	5:36
Total length:				36:21

== Personnel ==
- George Duke – vocals, keyboards, percussion, string arrangement (tracks: 3, 8), bass synthesizer (track 7), producer
- Stanley Clarke – vocals, bass, guitar, sitar, cello, string arrangement (tracks: 4, 8), producer
- Michael Boddicker – bass synthesizer (track 7)
- John Frederick Robinson – drums
- Norman Gary Foster – saxophone (track 3)
- Jerry Hey – piccolo trumpet C (track 8)
- Frederick Seykora – strings
- Israel Baker – strings
- Endre Granat – strings
- Paula Hochhalter – strings
- Barbara Thomason – strings
- Marcia Van Dyke – strings
- Bonnie Douglas – strings
- Selene Hurford – strings
- Denyse Buffum – strings
- Sheldon Sanov – strings
- Kenneth Yerke – strings
- Rollice Dale – strings
- Dorothy Wade – strings
- Nils Oliver – strings
- Assa Drori – strings
- Art Royval – strings
- Charles Veal Jr. – concertmaster
- George Del Barrio – conducting
- Brent Averill – engineering
- Tommy Vicari – engineering
- Dave Concors – engineering
- Jim Cassell – engineering
- Erik Zobler – engineering
- Wally Buck – mixing assistant
- George Horn – mastering
- Kathe Hoffman – album coordinator

== Chart history ==
Chart (1981)	Peak position
US Billboard 200	33
US Top R&B/Hip-Hop Albums (Billboard)	7
