= Granville Redmond =

American painter

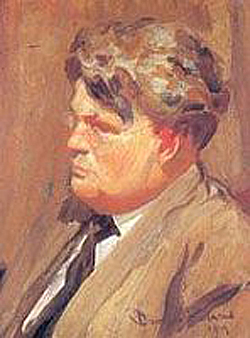
- Self-portrait (1919)
- Born: Granville Richard Seymour Redmond; March 9, 1871; Philadelphia, Pennsylvania
- Died: May 24, 1935 (aged 64); Los Angeles, California
- Education: Impressionism, Tonalism
- Known for: landscape painting

Granville Richard Seymour Redmond (March 9, 1871 – May 24, 1935) was an American landscape painter and exponent of Tonalism and California Impressionism. He was also an occasional actor with his friend Charlie Chaplin.

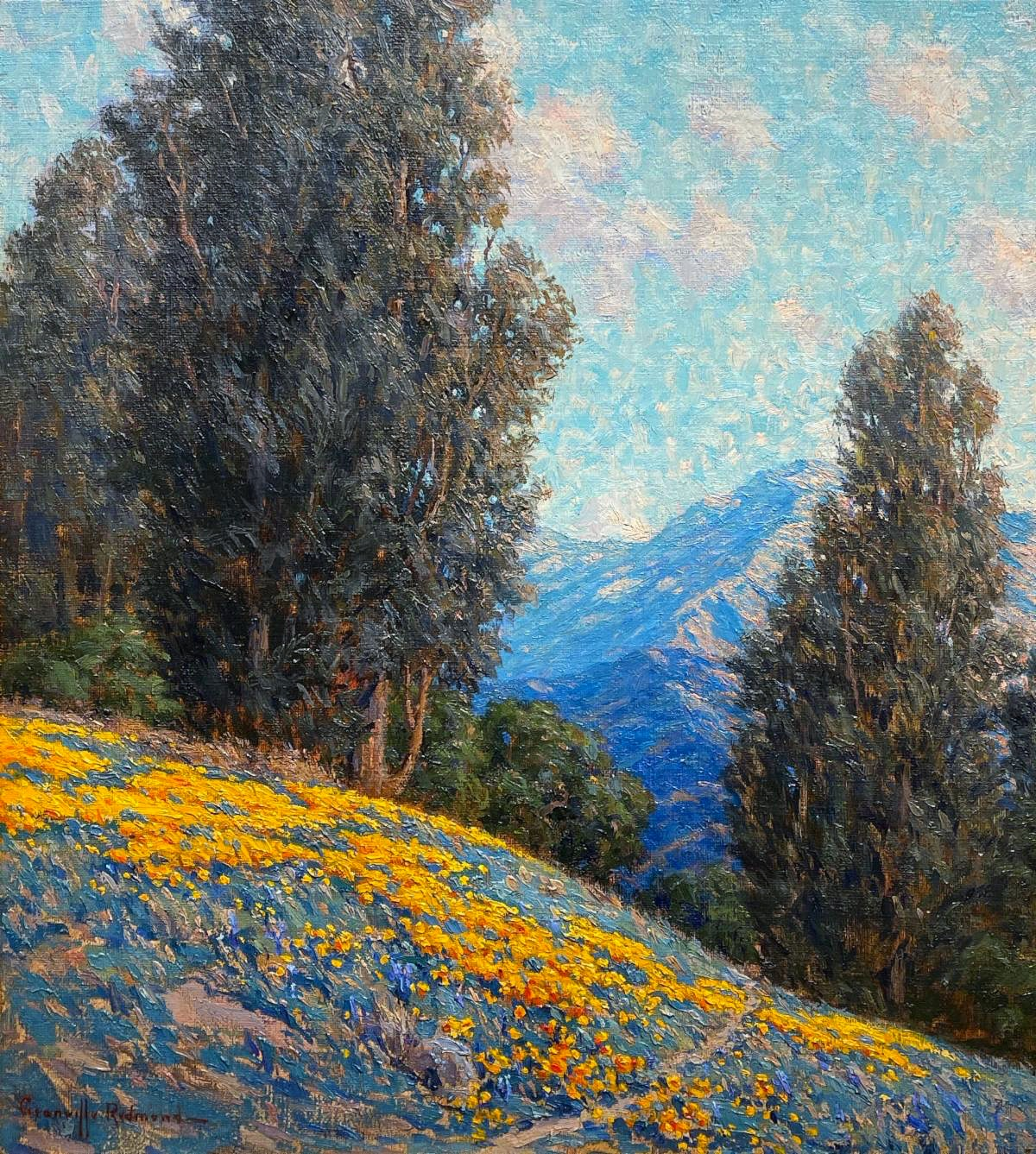
Steven Stern Fine Arts Collection

== Early years ==
Redmond was born in Philadelphia, Pennsylvania on March 9, 1871 to a hearing family. Some sources claim he became Deaf as a result of scarlet fever, which he contracted between the ages of 2½ and 3. However, Guilbert Braddock asserts that Redmond was Deaf from infancy. This change may have prompted his family's decision to move from the East Coast to San Jose, California: possibly for his education at the Berkeley School for the Deaf.

== Study ==
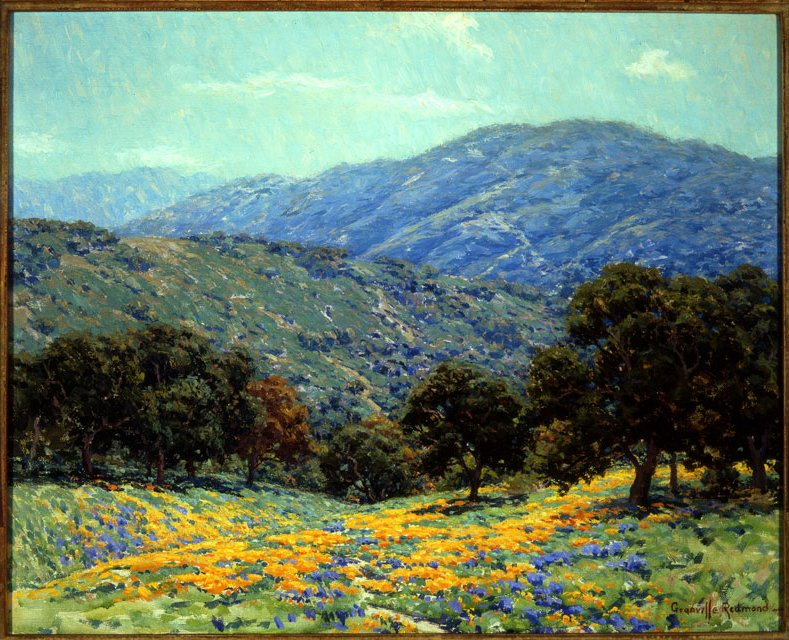
Flowers Under the Oaks (Irvine Museum)

Granville attended the California School for the Deaf (CSD) in Berkeley from 1879 to 1890 where his artistic talents were recognized and encouraged. There his teacher Theophilus d'Estrella taught him painting, drawing and pantomime.

When he graduated from CSD, Redmond enrolled at another CSD: the California School of Design in San Francisco, where he worked for three years with teachers such as Arthur Frank Mathews and Amédée Joullin. He famously won the W.E. Brown Medal of Excellence. He associated with many other artists, including Gottardo Piazzoni and Giuseppe Cadenasso. Piazzoni learned American Sign Language, and he and Redmond became lifelong friends. They lived together in Parkfield, California and Tiburon, California.

In 1893 Redmond won a scholarship from the California School of the Deaf, which made it possible for him to study in Paris at the Académie Julian under teachers Jean-Paul Laurens and Jean-Joseph Benjamin-Constant. He roomed with the sculptor Douglas Tilden, another graduate of the California School for the Deaf. "Tilden was a tremendous help to Redmond, teaching him French and how to get around in Paris; they became best friends for the rest of their lives." In 1895, Redmond's painting Matin d'Hiver was accepted for the Paris Salon.

== Back in California ==
In 1898, he returned to California and settled in Los Angeles. He was married in 1899 to Carrie Ann Jean, a former student of the Illinois School for the Deaf. They had three children.

== Working with Chaplin ==
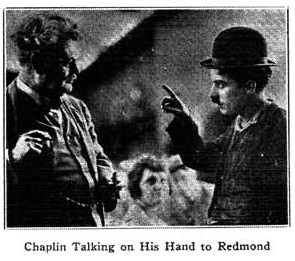
caption="Chaplin Talking on His Hand to Redmond"

While living in Los Angeles, Redmond was introduced to Charles Chaplin by the painter Gottardo Piazzoni. Chaplin admired the natural expressiveness of a deaf person using American Sign Language and asked Redmond to help him develop the techniques Chaplin later used in his silent films. Chaplin, impressed with Redmond's skill, gave Redmond a studio on the movie lot, collected his paintings, and sponsored him in silent acting roles, including the sculptor in City Lights. He told a writer for The Silent Worker of a Redmond painting "I could look at it for hours. It means so many things." Chaplin's famous The Dance of the Oceana Rolls was Redmond-inspired.

During this time Redmond did not neglect his painting. Through Chaplin, he met Los Angeles neighbor artists Elmer Wachtel and Norman St. Clair. They showed works at the Spring Exhibition held in San Francisco in 1904. By 1905, Redmond was receiving considerable recognition as a leading landscape painter and bold colorist.

He died on May 24, 1935 in Los Angeles.

== Selected paintings ==
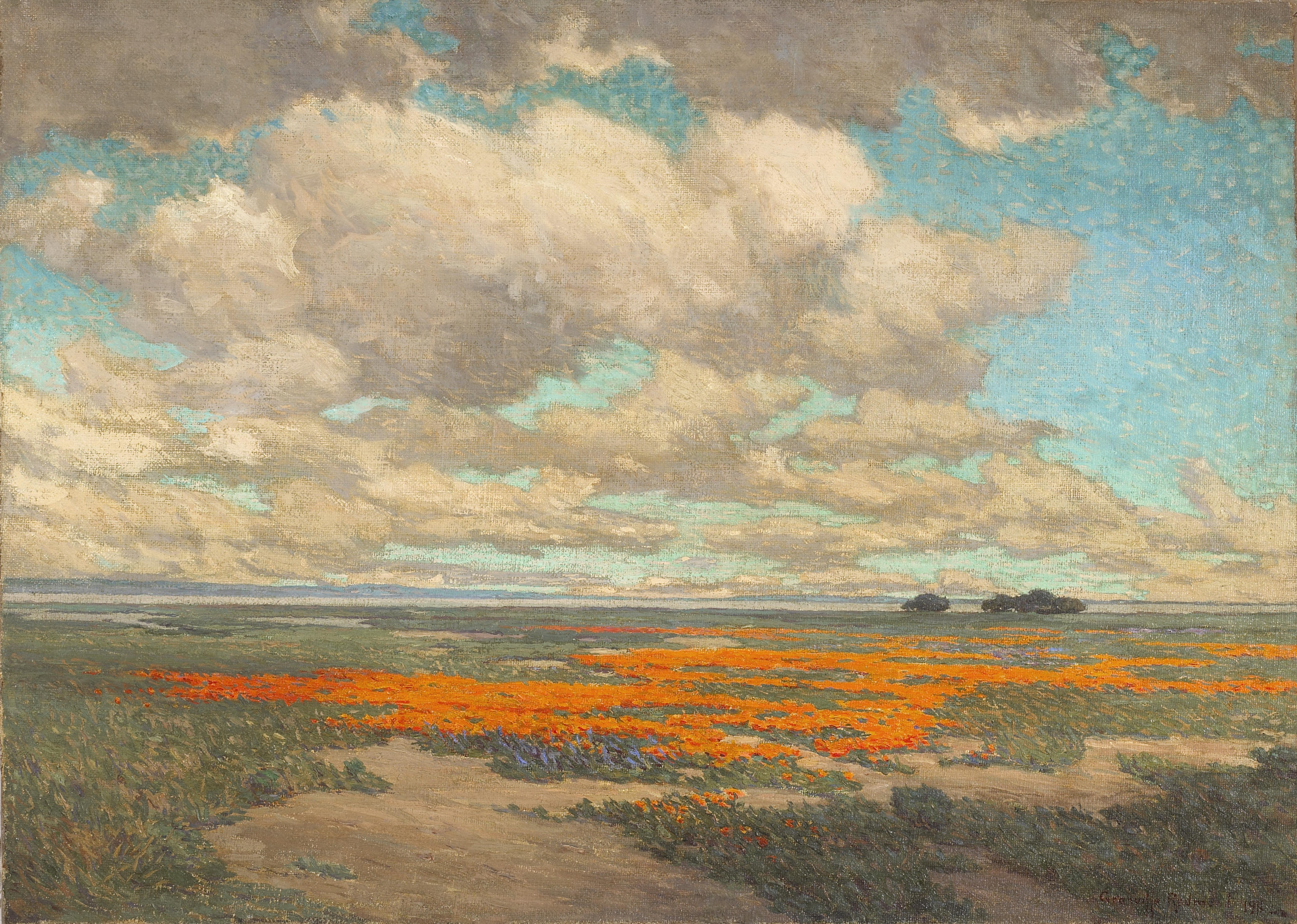
A Field of California Poppies

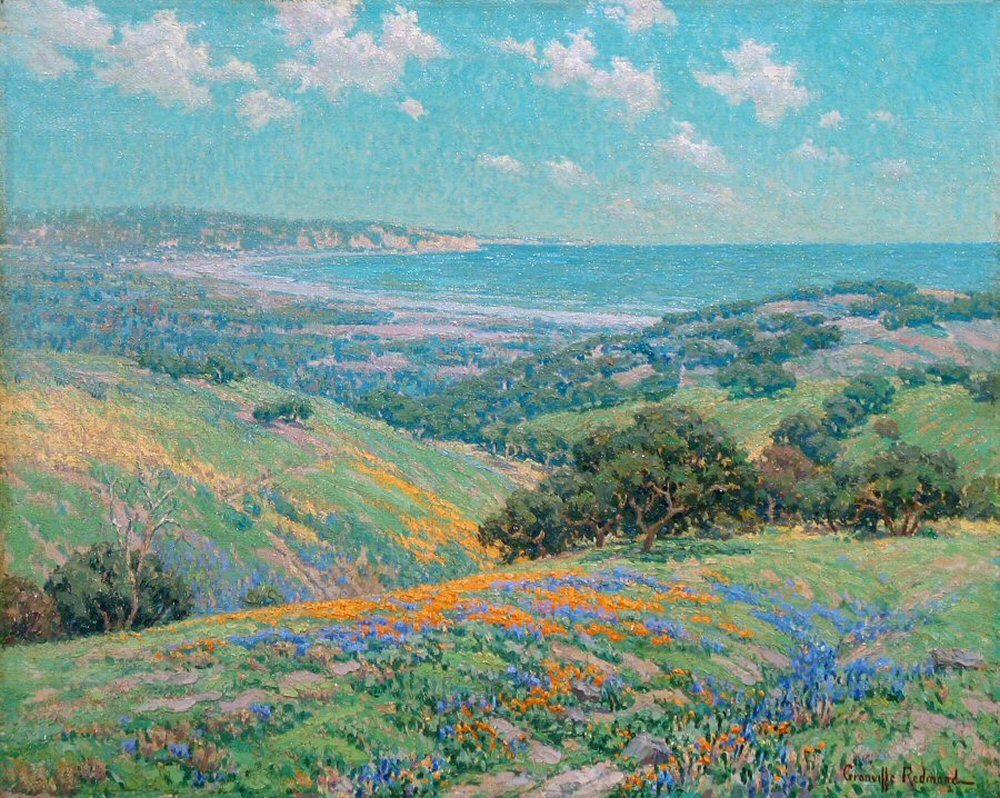
Malibu Coast Spring

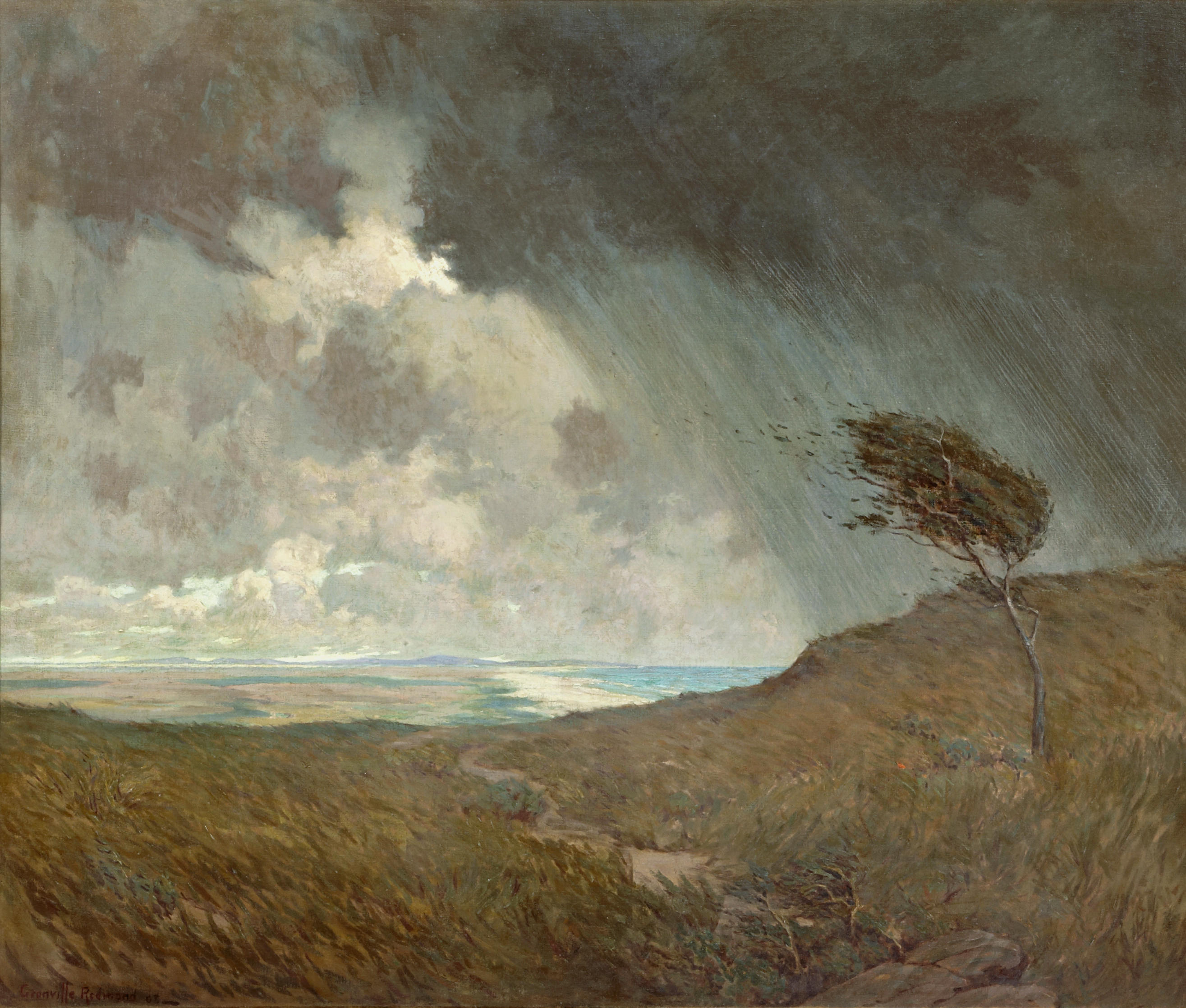
Coastal Storm

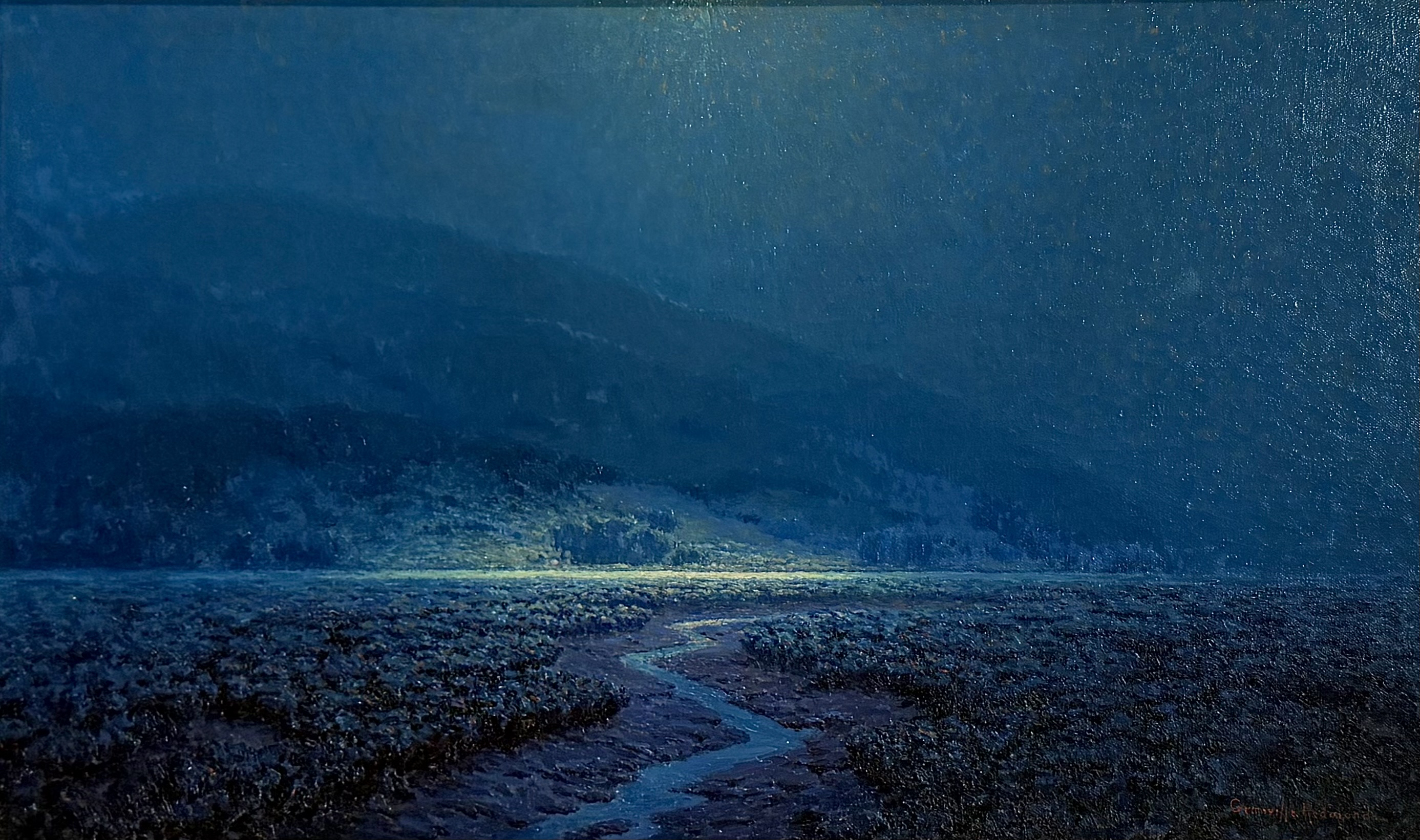
Untitled - Moonlight Marsh Scene

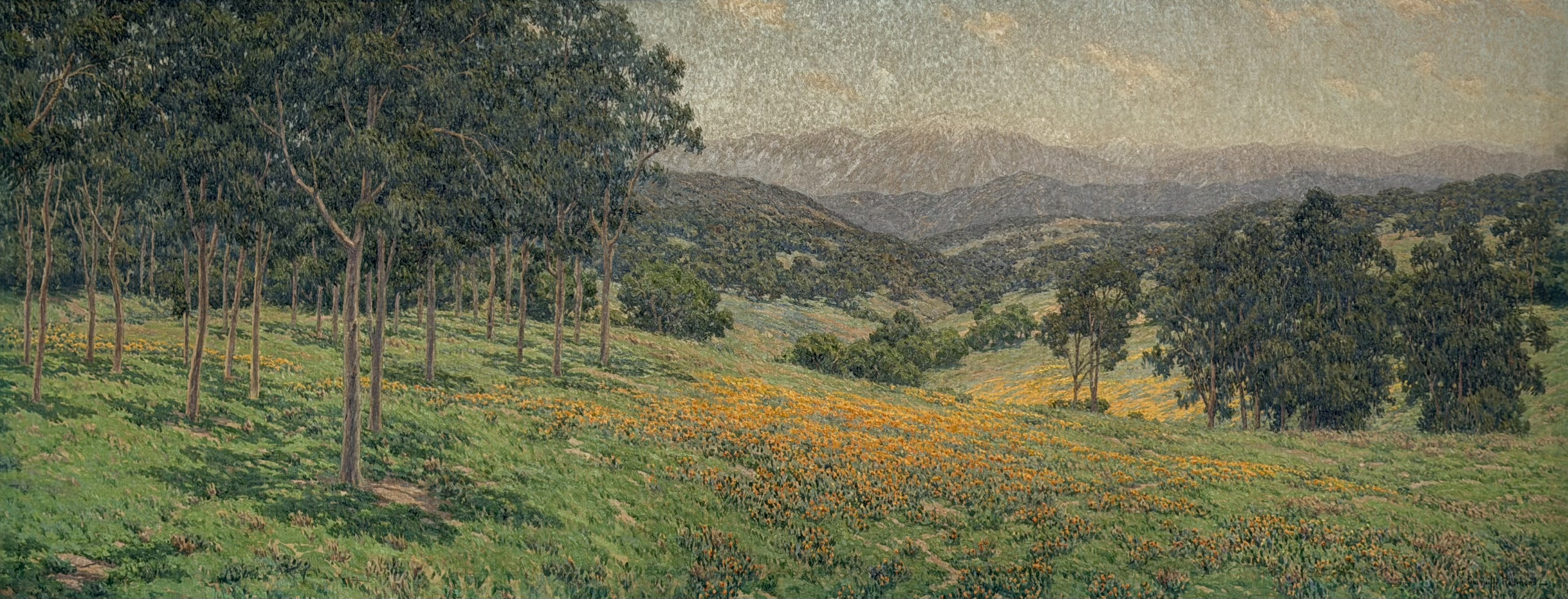
California Landscape with Flowers

== Filmography ==
Year	Title	Role	Notes
1918	A Dog's Life	Dance-hall owner	uncredited
1919	Sunnyside		uncredited
1919	A Day's Pleasure	Boat Passenger	uncredited
1921	The Idle Class	Guest	uncredited
1921	The Kid	The Man's Friend	uncredited
1921	The Three Musketeers	undetermined	uncredited
1923	A Woman of Paris	Man in Nightclub	uncredited
1925	A Regular Fellow	unknown	uncredited
1926	You'd Be Surprised	Grey, the Butler/Deputy Coroner	
1931	City Lights	Sculptor	uncredited

== Collections ==
- Bancroft Library, University of California, Berkeley
- California School for the Deaf, Fremont
- Cantor Arts Center, Stanford
- Crocker Art Museum, Sacramento
- De Young Museum, San Francisco
- Granville Redmond Fine Art, Los Angeles
- Huntington Library, San Marino, California
- Los Angeles County Museum of Art
- K. Nathan Gallery, La Jolla, California
- Museum of the City of New York
- Oakland Museum of California

== Awards ==
- Gold Medal, W. E. Brown Award, California School of Design, 1892
- Medal, Louisiana Purchase Exposition, 1904
- Silver Medal, Alaska-Yukon Pacific Exposition, Seattle, Washington, 1909
