= Dream On (album) =

Studio album by George Duke
- Released: 1982
- Studio: Le Gonks West (Hollywood); Westlake (Hollywood); A&M Studios (Hollywood)
- Genre: Smooth jazz; R&B
- Length: 46:24
- Label: Epic
- Producer: George Duke

George Duke chronology
A Brazilian Love Affair (1979)	Dream On (1982)	Guardian of the Light (1983)

Singles from Dream On
- 1. "Shine On" Released: 1982; 2. "Ride on Love" Released: 1982; 3. "I Will Always Be Your Friend" Released: 1982; 4. "Dream On" Released: 1982

Professional ratings
Review scores
Source	Rating
AllMusic	2.5/5 stars
The Rolling Stone Album Guide	1/5 stars

Dream On is the fifteenth studio album by American keyboardist and record producer George Duke. It was released in 1982 through Epic Records. The recording sessions for the album took place at Le Gonks West Studio in West Hollywood, California, except for horns on "Positive Energy" and strings, which were recorded at Westlake Recording Studios and A&M Studios respectively. It was mastered by Brian Gardner at Allen Zentz Mastering in Hollywood.

The album peaked at #48 on the Billboard 200 and at #17 on the Top R&B/Hip-Hop Albums chart in the United States. It spawned four singles: "Shine On", "Ride On Love", "I Will Always Be Your Friend" and "Dream On". Its lead single, "Shine On", peaked at #41 on the Billboard Hot 100, making it Duke's third charted single after "Reach for It" (#54) from 1977 Reach for It and "Sweet Baby" (#19) from 1981 The Clarke/Duke Project. "Ride on Love" was a minor success, peaking at #83 on the Hot R&B/Hip-Hop Songs chart. "I Will Always Be Your Friend" and "Dream On" weren't charted.

== Track listing ==
No.	Title	Writer(s)	Length
1.	"Shine On"	George Duke	5:12
2.	"You"	George Duke	4:37
3.	"Dream On"	Cedric Martin; Felton Clyde Pilate II	4:01
4.	"I Will Always Be Your Friend"	George Duke	3:27
5.	"Framed"	George Duke	3:18
6.	"Ride on Love"	George Duke	5:25
7.	"Son of Reach for It"	George Duke; Byron Miller; Leon Chancler	4:25
8.	"Someday"	George Duke	3:51
9.	"Positive Energy"	George Duke	3:33
10.	"Let Your Love Shine"	George Duke	4:27
Total length:			48:11

== Personnel ==
- George Duke – Fender Rhodes, acoustic piano (1, 4, 5, 6, 8, 9), Synare (1, 6), Prophet-5 (2–10), vocals (1–10), finger snaps (2), melodion (4), clavinet (5, 6, 9), lead vocals (5), backing vocals (5), Minimoog (6, 8), ARP synthesizer (7), Oberheim synthesizer (7)
- Michael Sembello – guitars (1–4, 6, 9)
- Charles Foster Johnson – guitars (7)
- Byron Miller – bass (1–7, 9)
- Leon "Ndugu" Chancler – drums, vocals (7)
- Paulinho da Costa – percussion (2, 4, 9, 10)
- Larry Williams – tenor saxophone (1), saxophone (2)
- Gary Herbig – saxophone (9)
- Bill Reichenbach, Jr. – trombone (1, 2, 9)
- Gary Grant – trumpet (1, 2, 9), flugelhorn (2)
- Jerry Hey – trumpet (1, 2, 9), flugelhorn (2)
- Carl Caldwell – backing vocals (5)
- Jean Carn – vocals (7)
- Dee Hendricks – vocals (7)
- Flora Purim – vocals (7)
- Deborah Thomas – vocals (7)
- Sybil Thomas – vocals (7)

Strings (3, 4, 6, 10)

- George Duke – conductor
- Charles Veal, Jr. – concertmaster
- Rosemary Veal – contractor
- Julianna Buffum, Paula Hochhalter, Dennis Karmazyn, Nils Oliver and Danny Rothmuller – cello
- Denyse Buffum, Rollice Dale, Virginia Majenski and Barbara Thomason – viola
- Arnold Belnick, Mari Botnick, Bonnie Douglas, Henry Ferber, Ron Folsom, Frank Foster, Endre Granat, Bob Sanov, Sheldon Sanov, Carol Shive, Paul Shure, Marcia Van Dyke, Dorothy Wade and Ken Yerke – violin

=== Production ===
- George Duke – producer, arrangements
- Erik Zobler – engineer (1, 2, 4, 6)
- Tommy Vicari – engineer (3, 5, 8, 9, 10)
- Kerry McNabb – recording (7)
- Jim Cassell – assistant engineer
- James "Chip" Orlando – assistant engineer
- Nick Spigell – assistant engineer
- Stewart Whitmore – assistant engineer
- Brent Averill – technician
- Brian Gardner – mastering
- Robert Duffy – cover concept, design
- Randy Moses – cover concept
- Sam Emerson – photography

== Chart history ==
Chart (1982)	Peak position
US Billboard 200	48
US Top R&B/Hip-Hop Albums (Billboard)	17
