= Festival of the Arts =

Festival of the Arts may refer to:

- Festival of the Arts (California), an art festival held annually in Laguna Beach, California
- Festival of the Arts (Grand Rapids), an art festival held annually in Grand Rapids, Michigan
- Detroit Festival of the Arts, an art festival held from 1986 to 2009 in Detroit, Michigan
