= Larry Williams (jazz musician) =

American musician, producer, composer, and arranger

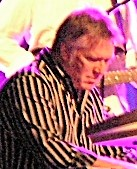
- Williams in 2006

Background information
- Born: Lawrence Lowell Williams; Kansas City, Mo
- Genres: Jazz; funk; soul; jazz rock; pop
- Occupations: Producer; composer; arranger; multi-instrumentalist
- Instruments: Keyboards; saxophone; flute; clarinet
- Website: willyworldmusic.com

Lawrence Lowell Williams is an American record producer, composer, arranger, and multi-instrumentalist. He is proficient on the keyboards, saxophone, flute, and clarinet. Williams began his musical career in the 1970s, and has since established himself as a prominent figure in the music industry. He regularly toured and recorded with Al Jarreau for more than three decades and was also a musician on Michael Jackson's albums Off The Wall, Thriller, and Bad.

== Early life ==
Williams was born in Kansas City, Kansas, and grew up in Overland Park. He began learning the clarinet at the age of eight, under the influence of his father, who played the saxophone.

Williams went on to study music at New Mexico State University and later transferred to Indiana University School of Music in 1969. While at university, Williams began playing with visiting orchestras, including those of Glen Campbell, Henry Mancini, and Johnny Mathis.

While studying at Indiana University, Williams met Jerry Hey and Kim Hutchcroft, who would later become members of jazz-fusion band Seawind. He decided to leave university and focus on working full-time with Seawind in Hawaii.

A notable part of the band's sound was the "Seawind Horns" (Williams with trumpeter Jerry Hey, and sax and flute player Kim Hutchcroft).

Seawind caught the attention of drummer-producer Harvey Mason. He encouraged the group to move to Los Angeles, California, where they quickly established a regular gig at the club The Baked Potato.

== Career ==
In Los Angeles, the band was noticed by producer and arranger Quincy Jones. This led to Williams and the other members of the Seawind Horns becoming studio musicians for Jones himself and several Jones-produced artists, including George Benson, The Brothers Johnson and Michael Jackson.

Williams has further recorded with Christopher Cross, David Crosby, Helen Reddy, Lee Ritenour, Lionel Richie, Mezzoforte, Michael Bolton, Michael Franks, Minnie Riperton, Natalie Cole, Olivia Newton-John, Pat Benatar, Patrice Rushen, Paul Young, Pink Floyd, Randy Crawford, Randy Newman, Ray Parker Jr., Richard Marx, Rick Astley, Roberta Flack, Sheena Easton, Simply Red and Stevie Nicks among others. Williams played tenor saxophone, flute and keyboards on Michael Jackson's album Thriller and is featured on keyboards and sax synth solo on "Speed Demon" from the album Bad .

== Discography ==
- 1970 — Crow By Crow - Crow
- 1970 — Same Old Story - Blodwyn Pig
- 1976 — Seawind - Seawind
- 1976 — Earthmover - Harvey Mason
- 1976 — Like A Seabird in the Wind - Olomana
- 1977 — Finger Paintings - Earl Klugh
- 1977 — Agora - Paulinho Da Costa
- 1977 — Funk in a Mason Jar - Harvey Mason
- 1977 — Window a Child - Seawind
- 1978 — Blam! - Brothers Johnson
- 1978 — Single - Bill Champlin
- 1978 — Street Player - Rufus & Chaka Khan
- 1978 — Patrice - Patrice Rushen
- 1978 — Waiting for the Rain - James Vincent
- 1978 — Heartbreaker - Dolly Parton
- 1978 — All Fly Home - Al Jarreau
- 1978 — Other Peoples Rooms - Mark Almond
- 1978 — Kenji Shock - Kenji Omura
- 1978 — Songbird - Barbra Streisand
- 1978 — Rudy Copeland - Rudy Copeland
- 1979 — Take It Home - B. B. King
- 1979 — Minnie - Minnie Riperton
- 1979 — Future Now - Pleasure
- 1979 — Realce - Gilberto Gil
- 1979 — Poses - Alain Chamfort
- 1979 — Feel the Night - Lee Ritenour
- 1979 — Masterjam - Rufus & Chaka Khan
- 1979 — Follow the Rainbow - George Duke
- 1979 — If the Shoe Fits - Ronnie Dyson
- 1979 — A Brazilian Love Affair - George Duke
- 1979 — The Third Album - Paul Jabara
- 1979 — Levitation - The Floaters
- 1979 — The World Within - Stix Hooper
- 1979 — Branda Russell - Brenda Russell
- 1979 — The Glow - Bonnie Raitt
- 1979 — Runnin' to Your Love - Eddie Henderson
- 1979 — Double or Nothing - Lani Hall
- 1979 — J Michael Reed - J Michael Reed
- 1979 — You've Got It - Baby'O
- 1979 — Off the Wall - Michael Jackson
- 1980 — Bi Coastal - Peter Allen
- 1980 — Give Me the Night - George Benson
- 1980 — Light Up the Night - The Brothers Johnson
- 1980 — Candle - Heatwave
- 1980 — My Babe - Roy Buchanan
- 1980 — Special Things - Pleasure
- 1980 — Lady T - Teena Marie
- 1980 — Hold On - High Inergy
- 1980 — Faces - Earth, Wind & Fire
- 1980 — 21 At 33 - Elton John
- 1980 — Jeff Kutash And The Dancin' Machine - Jeff Kutash and The Dancin' Machine
- 1980 — Supercharged - Tavares
- 1980 — Better Days - The Blackbyrds
- 1980 — Magnificent Madness - John Klemmer
- 1980 — Shine - Average White Band
- 1980 — Larsen Feiten Band - Larsen Feiten Band
- 1980 — John & Arthur Simms - John & Arthur Simms
- 1980 — Tony Comer & Crosswinds - Tony Comer & Crosswinds
- 1981 — Labor of Love - Detroit Spinners
- 1981 — Wall To Wall - Rene & Angela
- 1981 — Precious Time - Pat Benatar
- 1981 — By All Means - Alphonse Mouzon
- 1981 — Breakin' Away - Al Jarreau
- 1981 — Yellowjackets - Yellowjackets
- 1981 — Camouflage - Rufus & Chaka Khan
- 1981 — What Cha Gonna Do For Me - Chaka Khan
- 1981 — Galaxian - Jeff Lorber Fusion
- 1981 — The Dude - Quincy Jones
- 1981 — All This Way - Patty Brard
- 1981 — I Like Your Style - Jermaine Jackson
- 1981 — Straight Ahead - Sheree Brown
- 1981 — Looking Forward - Bob Bailey
- 1982 — Dream On - George Duke
- 1982 — Distant Lover - Alphonse Mouzon
- 1982 — The Music - Sheree Brown
- 1982 — Retro Active - Robert Kraft
- 1982 — Dream On - George Duke
- 1982 — Rit/2 - Lee Ritenour
- 1982 — The Dukes Bugatti & Musker - The Dukes
- 1982 — Incognito - Spyro Gyra
- 1982 — Wild Things Run Fast - Joni Mitchell
- 1982 — Corpo e Alma - Simone
- 1982 — Thriller - Michael Jackson
- 1982 — Lift Me Up - Herbie Hancock
- 1982 — Hey Ricky - Melissa Manchester
- 1982 — Bobbi Walker - Bobbi Walker
- 1982 — Shangri-La - Toshiyuki Honda
- 1982 — Step Into the Funk - Alphonse Mouzon
- 1983 — Bet Cha Say That to All the Girls - Sister Sledge
- 1983 — Emergency - Melissa Manchester
- 1983 — Bodies and Souls - The Manhattan Transfer
- 1983 — Trouble in Paradise - Randy Newman
- 1983 — Continuation - Philip Bailey
- 1983 — Attitude - Stevie Woods
- 1983 — Girl at Her Volcano - Rickie Lee Jones
- 1983 — Guardian of the Light - George Duke
- 1983 — It's All Your Night - James Ingram
- 1983 — Friends - Larry Carlton
- 1983 — The Front - The Front
- 1983 — Old Fool Back on Earth - Michel Colombier
- 1983 — Kleiton & Kledir - Kleiton & Kledir
- 1983 — Hurt Me Baby – Make Me Write Bad Checks - Rick Dees
- 1984 — Give My Regards to Broad Street - Paul McCartney
- 1984 — Half The Effort Twice the Effect - Peter Cupples
- 1984 — Banded Together - Lee Ritenour
- 1984 — I've Got the Cure - Stephanie Mills
- 1984 — So Romantic - Evelyn King
- 1984 — A Private Heaven - Sheena Easton
- 1984 — Human Racing - Nik Kershaw
- 1984 — Don't Look Any Further - Dennis Edwards
- 1984 — Self Control - Laura Branigan
- 1984 — Patti Austin - Patti Austin
- 1984 — Love Talk - Kimiko Kasai
- 1984 — Mancha De Dende Nao Sai - Moraes Moreira
- 1984 — Call of the Wild - Vicot Feldman's Generation Band
- 1985 — Durrell Coleman - Durell Coleman
- 1985 — Mahvelous! - Billy Crystal
- 1985 — In London - Al Jarreau
- 1985 — Warming Up to the Ice Age - John Hiatt
- 1985 — Hold Me - Laura Branigan
- 1985 — Maisha - Sadao Watanabe
- 1985 — Mathematics - Melissa Manchester
- 1985 — The Heart of the Matter - Kenny Rogers
- 1985 — Soul Kiss - Olivia Newton-John
- 1985 — Unguarded - Amy Grant
- 1985 — Eaten Alive - Diana Ross
- 1985 — Magic - Four Tops
- 1985 — Medals - Russ Taff
- 1985 — Nightshift - Commodores
- 1985 — West of Broadway - Albert Fortis
- 1985 — Silk & Steel - 5 Star
- 1986 — Earth Run - Lee Ritenour
- 1986 — Headed For The Future - Neil Diamond
- 1986 — Fahrenheit - Toto
- 1986 — Without Walls - Michael Sembello
- 1986 — David Foster - David Foster
- 1986 — August - Eric Clapton
- 1986 — Rod Stewart - Rod Stewart
- 1987 — Everlasting - Natalie Cole
- 1987 — Richard Marx - Richard Marx
- 1987 — Love Changes - Kashif
- 1987 — No Protection - Starship
- 1987 — Bad - Michael Jackson
- 1987 — Hai Hai - Roger Hodgson
- 1987 — Discovery - Larry Carlton
- 1987 — Watch Out! - Patrice Rushen
- 1987 — Yauretê - Milton Nascimento
- 1987 — What If - What If
- 1987 — Say It Again - Jermaine Stewart
- 1987 — This Time - Al Jarreau
- 1987 — After Dark - Ray Parker Jr
- 1987 — Portrait - Lee Ritenour
- 1987 — Reservation For Two - Dionne
- 1987 — Humansystem - TM Network
- 1988 — What Up Dog? - Was (Not Wass)
- 1988 — Other Roads - Boz Scaggs
- 1988 — Back Of My Mind - Christopher Cross
- 1988 — Brian Wilson - Brian Wilson
- 1988 — The Lover in Me - Sheena Easton
- 1988 — In the City of Angels - Jon Anderson
- 1988 — Festival - Lee Ritenour
- 1988 — Till i loved You - Barbra Streisand
- 1988 — Desiree - Desiree Coleman
- 1988 — Nothing But the Truth - Ruben Blades
- 1988 — Rock Solid - Commodores
- 1988 — Life in the Modern World - The Crusaders
- 1988 — Night After Night - George Duke
- 1989 — Back on the Block - Quincy Jones
- 1989 — Repeat Offender - Richard Marx
- 1989 — Larger Than Life - Jody Watley
- 1989 — Cries And Whispers - Robert Hart
- 1989 — A New Flame - Simply Red
- 1989 — Spellhound - Joe Sample
- 1990 — Everything but the Girl - The Language of Life
- 1990 — Other Voices - Paul Young
- 1990 — Get Here - Brenda Russell
- 1990 — Ashes to Ashes - Joe Sample
- 1990 — A View 3rd Street - Jude Cole
- 1990 — Summer Nights - Marlene and Seawind
- 1991 — Better Love - Mezzoforte
- 1991 — Free - Rick Astley
- 1991 — Future Street - Pages
- 1991 — Carry On - Patti Austin
- 1991 — Fortissimo' - Mezzoforte
- 1991 — Prince of Darkness - Big Daddy
- 1992 — Rockinghorse - Alannah Myles
- 1992 — Vivienne McKone - Vivienne McKone
- 1992 — Three Wishes - Spyro Gyra
- 1992 — Lynch Mob - Lynch Lob
- 1992 — Go West - Indian Summer
- 1992 — Snapshot - George Duke
- 1993 — No Strings - Sheena Easton
- 1993 — Jungle Fever - Neil Larsen
- 1993 — Keep On - 10 Degrees
- 1993 — Soul Talkin' - Brenda Russell
- 1993 — Memphis Bound - Bryan Lee
- 1994 — Baby I Love Your Way - Big Mountain
- 1994 — It's Lewis - Lewis Cowdrey
- 1994 — Braille Blues - Bryan Lee
- 1995 — Illusions - George Duke
- 1995 — Larry & Lee - Lee Ritenour & Larry Carlton
- 1995 — Q's Jook Joint - Quincy Jones
- 1995 — Remember - Seawind
- 1995 — Are My Ears On Wrong - Jakko
- 1995 — In My Lifetime - Neil Diamond
- 1997 — Down to Earth - Nichelle Nichols
- 1997 — Being There - Wilco
- 1997 — Shapes aAnd Patterns - Swing Out Sister
- 1997 — Eros - Eros Ramazzotti
- 1997 — Only You - Pauline Wilson
- 1998 — This Is Jazz - George Duke
- 1998 — This Is Love - Lee Ritneour
- 1998 — A Place in the Sun - Lit
- 1999 — Snowbound - Fourplay
- 1999 — A New Standard - Steve Tyrell
- 1999 — Roulette Girl - Mary Prankster
- 2000 — My Kind of Christmas - Christina Aguilera
- 2000 — Somebody Loves You - Bob & Pauline Wilson
- 2000 — Brian Wilson - Brian Wilson
- 2000 — Fingerprints - Larry Carlton
- 2001 — Bad For Me - Dee Dee Bridgewater
- 2001 — Collection - Tracy Chapman
- 2001 — Tribute - Pauline Wilson
- 2001 — On The Way To Love - Patti Austin
- 2001 — Deep into It - Larry Carlton
- 2002 — Be Not Nobody - Vanessa Carlton
- 2002 — I'm Right There - Samantha Mumba
- 2002 — All I Got - Al Jarreau
- 2004 — The Dana Owens Album - Queen Latifah
- 2004 — Accentuate The Positive - Al Jarreau
- 2005 — Real Illusions — Reflections - Steve Vai
- 2005 — PCD - The Pussycat Dolls
- 2005 — World of Brazil - Lee Ritenour
- 2008 — Dukey Treats - George Duke
- 2009 — Reunion - Seawind
