= The Dream (George Duke album) =

Studio album by George Duke
- Released: 1978
- Recorded: 1976
- Genres: Jazz-funk; jazz fusion
- Labels: MPS (Europe); Epic (North America)
- Producer: George Duke

George Duke chronology
Reach for It (1977)	The Dream (1978)	Don't Let Go (1978)

Professional ratings
Review scores
Source	Rating
AllMusic	4/5 stars

The Dream is the ninth album by George Duke, first released in Europe in 1978 on MPS Records. It was released in North America as The 1976 Solo Keyboard Album in 1982 on Epic Records.

== Track listing ==
All tracks are written by George Duke.

Side A
No.	Title	Alternate title	Length
1.	"Mr. McFreeze"		7:30
2.	"Love Reborn"		7:13
3.	"Tzina"	"Excerpts from the Opera Tzina"	6:05

Side B
No.	Title	Alternate title	Length
4.	"Spock Does the Bump at the Space Disco"	"Spock Gets Funky"	4:11
5.	"Pathways"		7:30
6.	"Vulcun Mind Probe"		6:17
7.	"The Dream That Ended"		3:11
