= 3 (Stanley Clarke and George Duke album) =

Studio album by Stanley Clarke & George Duke
- Released: June 12, 1990
- Studios: Ocean Way Recording (Hollywood, California); Le Gonks West; Benedict Canyon Studios
- Genre: Jazz fusion
- Length: 46:20
- Label: Epic
- Producers: George Duke; Stanley Clarke

Stanley Clarke & George Duke chronology
The Clarke/Duke Project II (1983)	3 (1990)	The Clarke/Duke Project Volumes I, II & III (compilation) (2010)

Stanley Clarke chronology
If This Bass Could Only Talk (1988)	3 (1990)	Passenger 57 (soundtrack) (1992)

George Duke chronology
Night After Night (1989)	3 (1990)	Snapshot (1992)

Professional ratings
Review scores
Source	Rating
AllMusic	2.5/5 stars
Select	3/5 medals

3 is the third and final collaborative album by Stanley Clarke and George Duke, released in 1990 on Epic Records. The album peaked at No. 7 on the US Billboard Contemporary Jazz Albums chart.

== Overview ==
Artists such as Gerald Alston, Rahsaan Patterson, West Coast hip hop group Above The Law and Philip Bailey, Phil Perry, Howard Hewett and Jeffrey Osborne appear on the album. Other artists like Jerry Hey, Michael Landau, George Bohanon, Brandon Fields, Wayne Shorter, Robert Brookins, Joe Henderson, Kirk Whalum, and drummer Dennis Chambers are also featured.

== Singles ==
The cover of Parliament-Funkadelic's "Mothership Connection" was released as a 12" single. George Clinton appeared in the music video.

"Lady" was released as a promotional and 7" single along with "Find Out Who You Are".

== Track listing ==
No.	Title	Lyrics	Music	Length
1.	"Pit Bulls (An Endangered Species)"		George Duke; Stanley Clarke	4:15
2.	"Oh Oh"		George Duke; Stanley Clarke; Robert Brookins	4:58
3.	"No Place to Hide" (featuring Rahsaan Patterson & Above The Law)	George Duke; Gregory Hutchison; Larry Goodman	Stanley Clarke	5:02
4.	"Somebody Else"		George Duke	5:27
5.	"Mothership Connection"		Bernie Worrell; Bootsy Collins; George Clinton	5:10
6.	"Right by My Side" (featuring Gerald Alston)	Stanley Clarke; Dennis Matkosky	Stanley Clarke	5:11
7.	"From the Deepest Corner of My Heart"		Stanley Clarke	1:17
8.	"Lady"		George Duke	4:21
9.	"Find Out Who You Are"		Stanley Clarke	4:38
10.	"Quiet Time"		George Duke	1:03
11.	"Finger Prints"		George Duke; Stanley Clarke	3:48
12.	"Always"		George Duke	1:09
Total length:				46:20

== Personnel ==
Primary artists

- George Duke – keyboards (tracks: 1–6, 8–9, 11), synthesizer (tracks: 7, 10, 12), vocals (tracks: 2, 5, 9), lyrics (track 2), lead vocals (tracks: 4, 8), producer
- Stanley Clarke – bass (tracks: 1–9, 11–12), keyboards (track 3), vocals (track 5), lyrics (track 6), lead vocals (track 9), producer

Vocalists

- Rahsaan Patterson – lead vocals (track 3)
- Gerald Alston – lead vocals (track 6)
- Gregory Fernan Hutchison – lyrics & rap vocals (track 3)
- Philip Eugene Perry – vocals (tracks: 2, 5, 9), backing vocals (track 3)
- Carl Carwell – vocals (tracks: 4, 5, 9), backing vocals (track 3)
- Howard Hewett Jr. – vocals (track 2)
- Jeffrey Linton Osborne – vocals (track 2)
- Roy Galloway – vocals (track 4), backing vocals (track 3)
- James Earl Gilstrap – vocals (track 4), backing vocals (track 3)
- Darrell Cox – vocals (track 5)
- Philip Irvin Bailey – vocals (track 5)
- Leon "Ndugu" Chancler – vocals (track 5)
- Larry Goodman – rap lyrics (track 3)
- Dennis Matkosky – lyrics (track 6)

Instrumentalists

- Dennis Milton Chambers – drums (tracks: 1–3, 5–6, 8–9, 11), hi-hats (track 4)
- Robert Brookins – keyboards (track 2)
- Brandon Fields – alto saxophone (track 5)
- Kirk Whalum – tenor saxophone (track 5)
- George Roland Bohanon Jr. – trombone (track 5)
- Jerry Hey – trumpet (track 5)
- Michael Landau – guitar (track 6)
- Wayne Shorter – soprano saxophone (track 9)
- Joe Henderson – tenor saxophone (track 9)
- Rayford Griffin – drums (track 11)
- Buell Neidlinger – double bass
- Dorothy Remsen – harp
- Earl Madison – cello
- Steve Erdody – cello
- Ronald Cooper – cello
- Douglas L. Davis – cello
- Dan Neufeld – viola
- Miriam Meyer – viola
- Marilyn Baker – viola
- Carole Mukogawa – viola
- Mihail Zinovyev – viola
- Samuel Boghossian – viola
- Bill Hybel – violin
- Neal Laite – violin
- Murray Adler – violin
- Israel Baker – violin
- Endre Granat – violin
- Brenton Banks – violin
- Reginald Hill – violin
- Michael Ferril – violin
- Mitchell Newman – violin
- Armen Garabedian – violin
- Claudia Parducci – violin
- Anatoly Rosinsky – violin
- Alexander Horvath – violin
- Franklyn D'Antonio – violin
- George Del Barrio – conducting

Technicals

- Erik Zobler – mixing & recording
- Mick Guzauski – mixing (tracks: 3, 6)
- Kevin Fisher – additional engineering
- Steve Sykes – additional engineering
- Dan Humann – additional engineering
- David Rideau – additional engineering
- Steve Holroyd – additional engineering
- Bernie Grundman – mastering
- Linda McClary – production coordinator

Additional

- Chris Cuffaro – photography
- Mary Maurer – art direction
- Nancy Donald – art direction

== Chart history ==
Chart (1990)	Peak position
US Contemporary Jazz Albums (Billboard)	7
US Top R&B Albums (Billboard)	52
