= Festival of the Arts (California) =

Art festival in Laguna Beach, California, United States

Festival of Arts
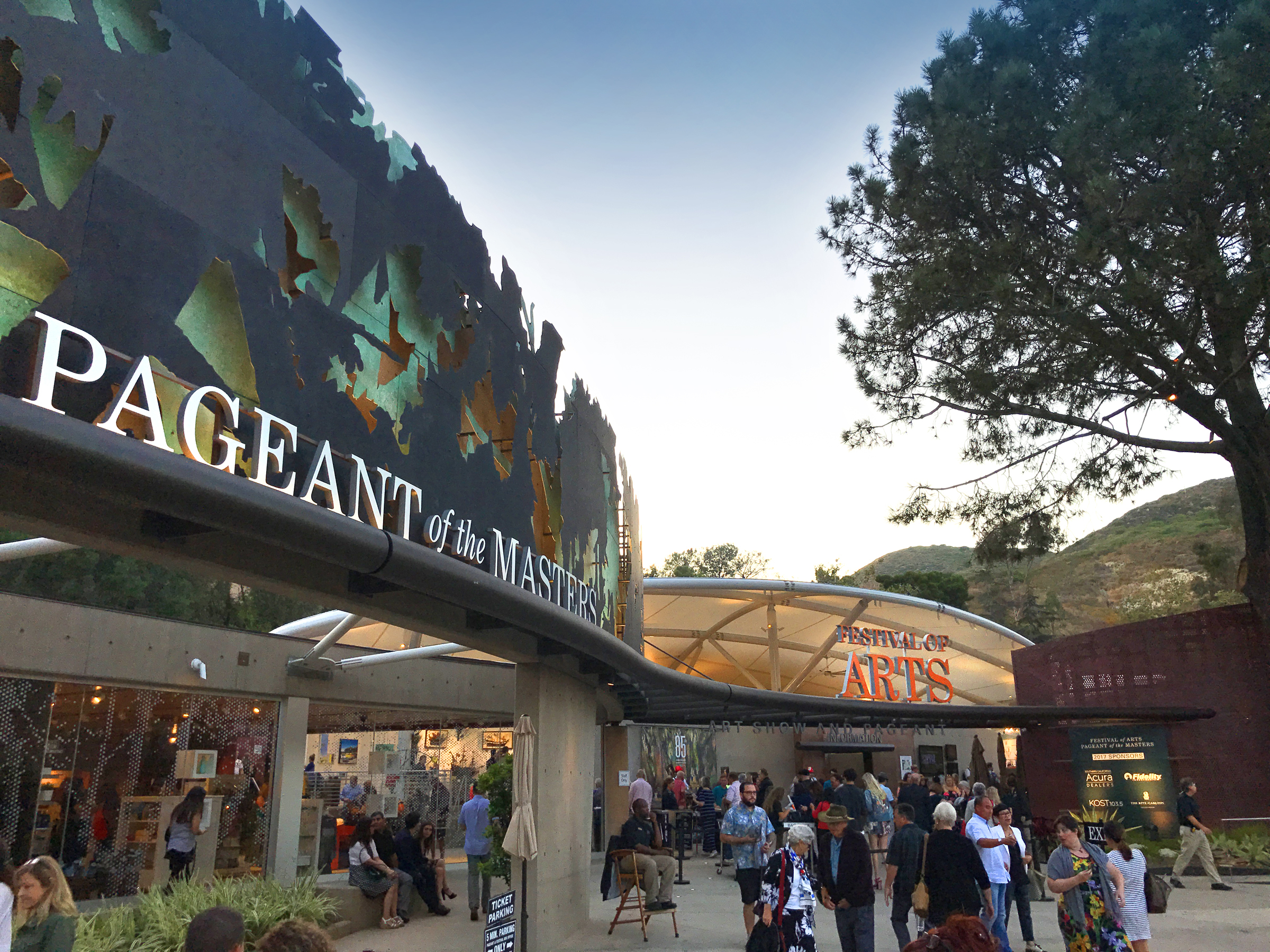
- Entrance to the Festival of Arts venue
- Interactive map of Festival of Arts
- Coordinates: 33°32′54″N 117°46′56″W
- Elevation: 70 ft (21 m)

Construction
- Opened: August 7, 1946; 80 years ago
- Renovated: 2011; 2016 (facade); 2017
- Expanded: 1957 (Tivoli Terrace); 1969 (Forum Theater); 1975 (administrative offices); 2010 (foaSOUTH gallery)

The Festival of Arts is a seasonal art festival in Laguna Beach, California, United States. The festival, which occurs annually in the summer, is home to a collection of booths operated by local painters, sculptors, photographers, and other artists. The festival grounds are also home to the Irvine Bowl, where the Pageant of the Masters is performed. On most evenings, the festival will offer live music, typically before a showing of the Pageant of the Masters. The festival currently holds a 40-year lease with the city of Laguna Beach and is scheduled to remain in the city through at least 2041.

== History ==
The artistic foundation of Laguna Beach was marked by the arrival of San Francisco artist Norman St. Clair. His art inspired many residents of the area to start painting the landscapes of Laguna Beach and Laguna Canyon. The community's later desire for art-based gatherings later led to the formation of the Festival of Arts. The first Laguna Beach art gallery opened in 1918 to much excitement. In 1932, the artists of the community held a makeshift festival in hope of courting tourists visiting Los Angeles for the Summer Olympics, an early formation of the Festival of Arts. The festival was shaped into much of what it is today by construction worker and artist Roy Ropp in 1935. The Festival of Arts did not have a permanent home until 1941 when it was moved into its current grounds. The newly constructed grounds sat empty for years due to World War II, and were not able to be used until August 1946. Tivoli Terrace, a restaurant currently operating at the back of the venue notable for its paraboloid roof, was designed by Donald Williamson and opened in January 1957. The festival grounds were re-situated and renovated in 2017.

On September 24, 2003, a time capsule was buried at the site in honor of the 70th anniversary of the Festival of Arts. The capsule is marked to be open on September 30, 2041.

The Festival of Arts did not operate in person for the summer 2020 season due to safety concerns regarding the COVID-19 outbreak, the first cancellation of all events at the grounds since World War II. In place of the cancelled in-person events, an online gala was held, and $300,952 of revenue was raised to be put toward management costs for 2020 as well as preparation for the summer 2021 season. Art exhibits were also featured online in coordination with the event.

== Irvine Bowl ==
Irvine Bowl
- Pageant of the Masters Amphitheater
- Interactive map of Irvine Bowl
- Coordinates: 33°32′54″N 117°47′00″W
- Elevation: 75 ft (23 m)
- Capacity: 2,600

Construction
- Opened: November 16, 1941; 84 years ago
- Renovated: 1953; 2011
- Expanded: 2005 (Pageant workshops)

Tenant
- Pageant of the Masters (1946–present)

The Irvine Bowl is a 2,600 seat amphitheatre directly connected to the Festival of Arts grounds. The venue hosts the Pageant of the Masters, a performance art show known for its living picture depictions of famous artwork. Volunteer crews make use of makeup, lighting, and detailed sets to blend in as subjects of famous paintings and sculptures. The show has operated at the outdoor theatre annually since 1946, its first show delayed by World War II and only interrupted since by the COVID-19 pandemic. The current stage was constructed in 1953, replacing the former barnlike structure used for six years. Portions of the venue were rebuilt in the 1990s following damage from flooding and several mudslides. The Amphitheater is named in honor of James Irvine, who donated the property to use for the pageant.

== See also ==
- Sawdust Art Festival
