= Time Exposure (Stanley Clarke album) =

Studio album by Stanley Clarke
- Released: August 28, 1984
- Studio: Larrabee (West Hollywood)
- Genres: Jazz fusion; funk; R&B
- Length: 35:46
- Label: Epic
- Producer: Stanley Clarke

Stanley Clarke chronology
Let Me Know You (1982)	Time Exposure (1984)	Find Out! (1985)

Singles from Time Exposure
- 1. "Are You Ready (For the Future)/Speedball" Released: 1984; 2. "Heaven Sent You" Released: 1984; 3. "Future/Spacerunner" Released: 1984

Time Exposure is the ninth studio album by American jazz fusion bassist Stanley Clarke, released on August 28, 1984, by Epic Records. The album features musical assistance from Jeff Beck, George Duke, Howard Hewett and Ernie Watts, amongst others.

The album was digitally remastered in 2013 by Funky Town Grooves and included five bonus tracks.

== Critical reception ==
Professional ratings
Review scores
Source	Rating
AllMusic	3/5 stars
The Rolling Stone Jazz Record Guide	3/5 stars

In a retrospective review for AllMusic, critic Richard S. Ginell wrote that "The sheer speed and power of Clarke's electric and piccolo bass work is astonishing throughout the album, and the CD as a whole has a techno sound and edge reflecting a period of time just before analog synthesizers were swept away by digital instruments."

== Track listing ==
All tracks composed by Stanley Clarke, except where indicated.

Side one

1. "Play the Bass 10^{3}" – 0:46
2. "Are You Ready (For the Future)" (Clarke, Denzil Miller) – 3:15
3. "Speedball" – 3:12
4. "Heaven Sent You" (Denzil Miller, Howard Hewett) – 6:00
5. "Time Exposure" – 4:48

Side two

1. "Future Shock" (Clarke, Darryl Phinnessee, Howard Smith) – 4:31
2. "Future" (Clarke, Louis Johnson) – 4:03
3. "Spacerunner" – 3:14
4. "I Know Just How You Feel" – 5:57

Bonus tracks on 2013 Funky Town Grooves remaster

10. "Heaven Sent You" (12" Mix) – 5:57
11. "Heaven Sent You" (7" Mix) – 3:26
12. "Are You Ready (For the Future)" (12" Mix) – 4:02
13. "Speedball (12" Mix)" – 3:24
14. "Future (12" Mix)" – 6:15

== Personnel ==
Credits are adapted from the Time Exposure liner notes.

- Stanley Clarke – bass guitar; piccolo bass; tenor bass; bass box; talk box; keyboards; Korg synthesizer; drums; percussion; vocals
- Todd Cochran – keyboards; Roland Jupiter-8; Prophet-5
- George Duke – keyboards; Prophet-5
- Craig Harris – keyboards; Synclavier; vocoder; vocals
- Denzil Miller – keyboards
- Jeff Beck – guitar; talk box; guitar synthesizer
- Ray Gomez – rhythm guitar
- Greg Boyer – horn
- Bennie Cowan – horn
- Gregory Thomas – horn
- Ernie Watts – tenor saxophone
- Howard Hewett – vocals
- Louis Johnson – bass; vocals
- John Gilston – drums
- John Robinson – drums
- Jim Gilstrap – backing vocals
- Darryl Phinnessee – backing vocals
- Howard Smith – backing vocals

Production and artwork

- Stanley Clarke – producer
- Erik Zobler – engineer
- David Coleman – illustration; artwork
- Randee Saint Nicholas – photography
- Steve Schmidt – assistant engineer
- Jeff Silver – assistant engineer
- Toni Green – assistant engineer
- Donald Lane – art direction
- Brian Gardner – mastering engineer

== Charts ==
Chart	Peak position
Swedish Albums (Sverigetopplistan)	34
