= Follow the Rainbow =

Studio album by George Duke
- Released: 1979
- Studio: Westlake Recording Studios (Los Angeles, CA); Electric Lady Studios (New York City, NY)
- Genre: Jazz-funk
- Length: 43:11
- Label: Epic
- Producer: George Duke

George Duke chronology
Don't Let Go (1978)	Follow the Rainbow (1979)	Master of the Game (1979)

Singles from Follow the Rainbow
- 1. "Party Down" Released: 1979; 2. "Say That You Will / I Am for Real (May the Funk Be with You)" Released: 1979; 3. "Pluck" Released: 1980

Follow the Rainbow is the twelfth studio album by American keyboardist George Duke released in 1979 through Epic Records. The album peaked at No. 3 on the Billboard Top Jazz Albums chart and No. 17 on the Billboard Top Soul Albums chart.

== Overview ==
Follow the Rainbow was produced by George Duke. Recording sessions for the album took place at Westlake Recording Studios in Hollywood, California, except for track 8, "Corine", which was recorded at Electric Lady Studios in New York City.

Duke played various keyboard instruments on Follow the Rainbow, including Fender Rhodes, Yamaha Electric Grand, Yamaha Grand Piano 9', Hohner D-6 clavinet, ARP Odyssey, Minimoog, Oberheim, Prophet, Funkosizer, Crumer Strings. The album features contributions from Napoleon Murphy Brock & Lynn Davis on vocals, Roland Bautista & Charles "Icarus" Johnson on guitars, Ricky Lawson & Leon Chancler on drums, Larry Williams, Jerry Hey and Sheila Escovedo among others.

== Critical reception ==
Professional ratings
Review scores
Source	Rating
AllMusic	4.5/5 stars

Alex Henderson of AllMusic declared, "Follow the Rainbow is, in fact, a creative album, and it's an album that has very little to do with jazz... This album is consistently excellent, but it isn't recommended to jazz snobs—only those with a healthy appreciation of 1970s soul and funk will enjoy this album."

== Singles ==
"Say That You Will" reached No. 25 on the Billboard Hot Soul Singles chart.

== Track listing ==
Follow the Rainbow track listing
No.	Title	Writer(s)	Length
1.	"Party Down"	George Duke; Bill Champlin (lyrics)	3:10
2.	"Say That You Will"	George Duke	3:06
3.	"Funkin' for the Thrill"	Byron Miller	4:02
4.	"Sunrise"	George Duke	4:45
5.	"Festival"	George Duke	6:41
6.	"I Am for Real (May the Funk Be with You)" (featuring Children of Distinction)	George Duke	5:21
7.	"Straight from the Heart"	George Duke	3:53
8.	"Corine"	George Duke	6:02
9.	"Pluck"	George Duke	4:48
10.	"Follow the Rainbow"	George Duke	1:24
Total length:			43:11

== Personnel ==
- George Duke – vocals, acoustic grand piano, electric grand piano, electric piano, clavinet, synthesizers
- Charles Foster Johnson – guitars
- Roland Bautista – electric guitar (1, 2)
- Kevin "Serious Biz" Dugan – guitars, bass (1, 2, 4–10)
- Byron Miller – bass (3), vocals (3)
- Ricky Lawson – drums (1–6, 9, 10)
- Leon "Ndugu" Chancler – drums (7, 8)
- Sheila E. – percussion, vocals
- Larry Williams – alto saxophone, tenor saxophone, flute
- Rick Culver – trombone
- Jerry Hey – trumpet, flugelhorn
- Napoleon Murphy Brock – vocals
- Lynn Davis – vocals
- Josie James – vocals
- Darrell "Sweet D" Cox – cosmotic narrator (1, 3)
- Children of Distinction – choir (6)

=== Production ===
- George Duke – producer
- Kerry McNabb – recording (1–7, 9, 10), mixing
- David Palmer – recording (8)
- Dave Rideau – assistant engineer
- John Golden – mastering at Kendun Recorders (Burbank, California)
- Tony Lane – art direction
- Tom Drennon – design
- John Laven – illustration
- Bruce Talamon – photography

== Chart history ==
Chart (1979)	Peak position
US Top LPs & Tape	56
US Top Jazz LPs	3
US Top Soul LPs	17
