= Dukey Stick =

Single by George Duke

from the album Don't Let Go
- Released: 1978
- Genre: Jazz
- Label: Epic
- Songwriter(s): George Duke
- Producer(s): George Duke

George Duke singles chronology
"Reach for It" (1977)	"Dukey Stick" (1978)	"Movin' On" (1978)

"Dukey Stick" is a song by American musician George Duke, released as a single in 1978 by Epic Records. The song reached No. 4 on the US Billboard Hot Soul Singles chart.

== Overview ==
"Dukey Stick" was composed and produced by George Duke. The song appears on Duke's 1978 studio album Don't Let Go.

== Critical reception ==
Brandon Soderberg of Spin called Dukey Stick ”a meaty hard-funk track that shoots chants, jazzy-wazzy drumming, shards of guitar whines, and plenty of electronic watery bloop-bloop around the core elements of pop-friendly R&B."

Richard S. Ginell of Allmusic also found, "(Don't Let Go)'s centerpiece is a self-parodic bit of shuck and jive called "Dukey Stick"."

== Samples ==
Scarface sampled Dukey Stick on Let Me Roll off his second studio album The World Is Yours.

== Charts ==
Chart (1978)	Peak position
US Hot Soul Singles (Billboard)	4
