= This Is Jazz (album series) =

Compilation album
- Released: 1996 - 1998
- Genre: Jazz, jazz fusion, big band, traditional pop
- Label: Columbia / Epic / Legacy

This Is Jazz is a mid-priced series of jazz albums issued by Legacy Recordings from 1996 to 1998 in association with the Columbia (CK numbers) and Epic (EK numbers) divisions of Sony Music Entertainment. Each album features a different artist from the Columbia/Epic stable. Each album is titled This Is Jazz followed by the number in the series.

The position of each album in the series is not consistent with the order of the catalog numbers (although the second half of the series begins to fall into somewhat sequential order). Many of these albums have since been reissued without the number. Due to the breadth of their careers, some artists had multiple releases in the series. Their later releases are identified by the focus of each additional release.

== Releases ==
| Year | # | Artist | Title | Catalog # |
|---|---|---|---|---|
| 1996 | 1 | Louis Armstrong | This Is Jazz 1 | CK 64613 |
| 1996 | 2 | Chet Baker | This Is Jazz 2 | CK 64779 |
| 1996 | 3 | Dave Brubeck | This Is Jazz 3 | CK 64615 |
| 1996 | 4 | Benny Goodman | This Is Jazz 4 | CK 64620 |
| 1996 | 5 | Thelonious Monk | This Is Jazz 5 | CK 64625 |
| 1996 | 6 | Charles Mingus | This Is Jazz 6 | CK 64624 |
| 1996 | 7 | Duke Ellington | This Is Jazz 7 | CK 64617 |
| 1996 | 8 | Miles Davis | This Is Jazz 8 | CK 64616 |
| 1996 | 9 | George Benson | This Is Jazz 9 | EK 64631 |
| 1996 | 10 | Weather Report | This Is Jazz 10 | CK 64627 |
| 1996 | 11 | Count Basie | This is Jazz 11 | CK 64966 |
| 1996 | 12 | Return to Forever | This Is Jazz 12 | CK 64967 |
| 1996 | 13 | Erroll Garner | This Is Jazz 13 | CK 64968 |
| 1996 | 14 | Stan Getz | This Is Jazz 14 | CK 64969 |
| 1996 | 15 | Billie Holiday | This Is Jazz 15 | CK 64622 |
| 1996 | 16 | Maynard Ferguson | This Is Jazz 16 | CK 64970 |
| 1996 | 17 | John McLaughlin | This Is Jazz 17 | CK 64971 |
| 1996 | 18 | Gerry Mulligan | This Is Jazz 18 | CK 64972 |
| 1996 | 19 | Wayne Shorter | This Is Jazz 19 | CK 64973 |
| 1996 | 20 | Sarah Vaughan | This Is Jazz 20 | CK 64974 |
| 1996 | 21 | Various Artists | This Is Jazz 21 (Sampler) | CK 65008 |
| 1997 | 22 | Miles Davis | This Is Jazz 22 (Plays Ballads) | CK 65038 |
| 1997 | 23 | Louis Armstrong | This Is Jazz 23 (Sings) | CK 65039 |
| 1997 | 24 | Woody Herman | This Is Jazz 24 | CK 65040 |
| 1997 | 25 | Freddie Hubbard | This Is Jazz 25 | EK 65041 |
| 1997 | 26 | Lester Young | This Is Jazz 26 | CK 65042 |
| 1997 | 27 | Ramsey Lewis | This Is Jazz 27 | CK 65043 |
| 1997 | 28 | Art Blakey | This Is Jazz 28 | CK 65044 |
| 1997 | 29 | Various Artists | This Is Jazz 29 (Bossa Nova) | CK 65045 |
| 1997 | 30 | Dirty Dozen Brass Band | This Is Jazz 30 | CK 65046 |
| 1997 | 31 | Al Di Meola | This Is Jazz 31 | CK 65047 |
| 1998 | 32 | Billie Holiday | This Is Jazz 32 (Sings Standards) | CK 65048 |
| 1998 | 33 | Tony Bennett | This Is Jazz 33 | CK 65049 |
| 1998 | 34 | Aretha Franklin | This Is Jazz 34 | CK 65050 |
| 1998 | 35 | Herbie Hancock | This Is Jazz 35 | CK 65051 |
| 1998 | 36 | Duke Ellington | This Is Jazz 36 (Plays Standards) | CK 65056 |
| 1998 | 37 | George Duke | This Is Jazz 37 | EK 65054 |
| 1998 | 38 | Miles Davis | This Is Jazz 38 (Electric) | CK 65449 |
| 1998 | 39 | Dave Brubeck | This Is Jazz 39 (Plays Standards) | CK 65450 |
| 1998 | 40 | Weather Report | This Is Jazz 40 (The Jaco Years) | CK 65451 |
| 1998 | 41 | Stanley Clarke | This Is Jazz 41 | EK 65452 |
