= Legacy Recordings =

American record label

- Parent company: Sony Music Entertainment
- Founded: 1990; 36 years ago
- Genre: Various
- Country of origin: United States
- Location: New York City
- Official website: legacyrecordings.com

Legacy Recordings is an American record label that is a division of Sony Music Entertainment. Formed in 1990 after Sony's acquisition of CBS Records, Legacy originally handled the archives of Sony Music-owned labels Columbia Records and Epic Records. In 2004, under the Sony BMG joint venture, the label began to manage the archives of RCA Records, J Records, Windham Hill Records, Arista, LaFace, Jive, and Buddah Records. Legacy Recordings also distributes Philadelphia International Records and the catalog of recordings produced by Phil Spector. It is not related to the defunct British independent label Legacy Records.

== Reissues/The Essential Series ==
The Essential Series are one- or two-disc compilations of an artist's extensive catalog. On occasion, certain albums in this series would include a limited edition third disc (labeled Essential 3.0), or be revised to include an artist's newer work (for example The Essential Bob Dylan). As of 2015, several volumes in the Essential series are available on vinyl LP.

Launched in 2009, Playlist is a series of single-disc compilation albums based on artists' best studio work during their time on one of the Sony labels (for example, the Van Morrison Playlist only contains tracks from the BANG Records sessions), serving as a successor to the previous Super Hits series and a less expensive alternative to the Essential series. A spinoff series, Setlist, features compilations of artists' live performances.

The first several albums came in a special eco-packet and to save paper, a PDF file was included on the disc, containing photographs, credits and liner notes. This was met with criticism, because the discs were easily scratched. Later Playlist albums were packaged in standard white jewel cases.

== See also ==
- List of record labels
- Lawrence Cohn, previous head of Legacy Recordings
- This Is Jazz (album series)

== See also ==
- List of Sony Music artists
