= Don't Let Go (George Duke album) =

1978 studio album by George Duke

Studio album by George Duke
- Released: 1978
- Recorded: 1978
- Studios: Paramount, Los Angeles, California
- Genres: Jazz-funk; jazz fusion; crossover jazz
- Length: 42:37
- Label: Epic
- Producer: George Duke

George Duke chronology
The Dream (1978)	Don't Let Go (1978)	Follow the Rainbow (1979)

Singles from Don't Let Go
- 1. "Dukey Stick" Released: 1978; 2. "Movin' On" Released: 1978

Professional ratings
Review scores
Source	Rating
AllMusic	2.5/5 stars
The Rolling Stone Album Guide	1/5 stars

Don't Let Go is a studio album by American keyboardist and record producer George Duke released in 1978 through Epic Records. The album peaked at No. 39 on the US Billboard 200 and at No. 5 on the US Billboard Top Soul Albums chart.

== Overview ==
Don't Let Go was produced by Duke. Recording sessions for the album took place at Paramount Recording Studios in Los Angeles, California. The album features guest appearances from Duke's frequent collaborators, guitarist Charles "Icarus" Johnson, bassist Byron Miller, drummer Leon "Ndugu" Chancler and percussionist Sheila Escovedo with guest appearances from Josie James and Napoleon Murphy Brock on lead vocals, Petsye Powell and Pattie Brooks on backing vocals, Roland Bautista and Wah Wah Watson on guitars, and Carol Shive and Judy Geist on violins.

== Singles ==
"Dukey Stick" reached No. 4 on the Billboard Hot R&B/Hip-Hop Songs chart.

== Track listing ==
No.	Title	Writer(s)	Length
1.	"We Give Our Love"	George Duke; Charles Foster Johnson; Byron Miller; Leon Chancler	4:33
2.	"Morning Sun"	George Duke	4:15
3.	"Percussion Interlude"	Sheila Escovedo; Leon Chancler	2:02
4.	"Dukey Stick"	George Duke	6:07
5.	"Starting Again"	George Duke	4:30
6.	"Yeah, We Going"	Leon Chancler	3:41
7.	"The Way I Feel" (featuring Josie James)	George Duke	4:45
8.	"Movin' On"	George Duke	4:22
9.	"Don't Let Go" (featuring Napoleon Murphy Brock)	George Duke	3:26
10.	"Preface"	George Duke	1:29
11.	"The Future"	George Duke	3:25
Total length:			42:37

== Personnel ==
- George Duke – keyboards, vocals, narrator
- Charles "Icarus" Johnson – guitar, narrator
- Wah Wah Watson – guitar licks (track 1 only)
- Roland Bautista – rhythm guitar
- Byron Lee Miller – bass, narrator
- Leon "Ndugu" Chancler – drums, timbales, narrator
- Sheila E. – congas, percussion, narrator
- Carol Shive – violin
- Judy Geist – violin
- Petsye Powell – backing vocals
- Pattie Brooks – backing vocals
- Josie James – lead vocals
- Napoleon Murphy Brock – lead vocals

Production

- George Duke – producer
- Kerry McNabb – engineer
- Mitch Gibson – assistant engineer
- John Golden – mastering at Kendun Recorders (Burbank, California).
- Glen Christensen – art direction
- Norman Seeff – photography

== Charts ==
Chart (1978)	Peak position
US Top LPs & Tape (Billboard)	39
US Top Soul LPs (Billboard)	5
