= Rocks, Pebbles and Sand =

Studio album by Stanley Clarke
- Released: 1980
- Studio: Legend Studios (Lynden, Washington); Chateau Recorders (North Hollywood, CA); A&M Studios (Hollywood, CA)
- Genre: Jazz fusion Jazz funk Jazz rock
- Length: 37:29
- Label: Epic
- Producer: Stanley Clarke

Stanley Clarke chronology
I Wanna Play For You (1979)	Rocks, Pebbles and Sand (1980)	Let Me Know You (1982)

Professional ratings
Review scores
Source	Rating
AllMusic	3/5 stars
The Rolling Stone Jazz Record Guide	3/5 stars
Smash Hits	6/10

Rocks, Pebbles and Sand is a 1980 album by jazz bass guitarist and multi-instrumentalist Stanley Clarke. This was the first recording where Stanley featured his tenor bass.

== Track listing ==
All tracks composed by Stanley Clarke, except where indicated.

No.	Title	Music	Length
1.	"Danger Street"		4:51
2.	"All Hell Broke Loose"		5:03
3.	"Rocks, Pebbles and Sand"		4:13
4.	"Underestimation"		3:43
5.	"You/Me Together"		4:05
6.	"We Supply"	Clarke, Louis Johnson	4:21
7.	"The Story of a Man and a Woman - Part 1: She Thought I Was Stanley Clarke - Part 2: A Fool Again - Part 3: - I Nearly Went Crazy (Until I Realized What Had Occurred)"		11:13
Total length:			37:29

== Personnel ==
- Stanley Clarke – bass, tenor bass, piccolo bass, guitar, keyboards, percussion, vocals
- Chick Corea – moog synthesizer, electric piano
- Steve Bach – keyboards
- Greg Phillinganes – keyboards
- Charles Johnson – guitar
- Louis Johnson – guitar, bass, vocals
- Victor Feldman – vibraphone
- Simon Phillips – percussion, drums
- John Robinson – drums on "We Supply"
- Dennis MacKay – percussion
- Valerie Johnson – vocals
- Josie James – vocals
- Marcy Levy – background vocals
- George Bohanon – trombone
- Lew McCreary – trombone
- David Duke – French horn
- Vincent DeRosa – French Horn
- Bill Reichenbach Jr. – horn
- Jerry Hey – horn, trumpet
- John Thomas – trumpet

Strings

- Mari Botnick – violin
- Thomas Buffum – violin
- Bobby Dubow – violin
- Sid Page – violin
- Sheldon Sanov – violin
- Carol Shive – violin
- Lya Stern – violin
- Charles Veal – violin
- John Wittenberg – violin
- Denyse Buffum – viola
- Ron Strauss – viola
- Helaine Wittenberg – viola
- Ronald Cooper – cello
- Rollice Dale – cello
- Niles Oliver – cello
- Frederick Seykora – cello

== Production ==
- Robert Giusti – Illustration artwork
- Nancy Donald – Design
- Henry Diltz – Photography
- Greg Falken – Assistant engineer
- Bruce Jost – Assistant engineer
- Chris Haas – Assistant engineer (Legend)
- Chip Leech, Larry Reuben – Assistant engineer (Mixing)
- Dennis MacKay – Engineer (Sound Production)
