= A Brazilian Love Affair =

Studio album by George Duke

Studio album by George Duke
- Released: 1980
- Recorded: March–April 1979
- Studio: Level E Hawai Recording Studio (Rio de Janeiro, Brazil); Westlake Studios (Hollywood, California); Le Gonks West (Hollywood, California)
- Genre: Jazz-funk
- Length: 48:11
- Label: Epic
- Producer: George Duke

George Duke chronology
Master of the Game (1979)	A Brazilian Love Affair (1980)	Dream On (1982)

Singles from A Brazilian Love Affair
- 1. "Brazilian Love Affair" Released: 1980

A Brazilian Love Affair is the fourteenth studio album by American musician George Duke, released in 1980 through Epic Records. The album peaked at No. 40 on the US Billboard Top Soul Albums chart and No. 33 on the UK Pop Albums Chart.

== Overview ==
The recording sessions took place from March 1979 to April 1979 at Level E Hawai Recording Studio in Rio de Janeiro and at Westlake Recording Studios. Additional recording took place at Le Gonks West Studio in West Hollywood, California. A Brazilian Love Affair was also mastered by Brian Gardner at Allen Zentz Recording Studio in Los Angeles.

Duke used various keyboard instruments for A Brazilian Love Affair, including Rhodes piano, Sequential Circuits Prophet-5, Oberheim polyphonic, Minimoog, ARP Odyssey, Yamaha CP-70. The album features several Brazilian jazz musicians. Such as vocalists Flora Purim, Milton Nascimento and Simone, guitarist Toninho Horta, drummer Robertinho Silva, and percussionist Airto Moreira. As well artists like Lynn Davis, Jerry Hey, Larry Williams, Sheila Escovedo and Roland Bautista appeared on the album.

=== Singles ===
The album's title tune "Brazilian Love Affair", peaked at No. 36 on the UK Pop Singles Chart.

== Critical reception ==
Professional ratings
Review scores
Source	Rating
AllMusic	4.5/5 stars
The Rolling Stone Album Guide	2/5 stars

Alex Henderson of AllMusic praised the album saying, "George Duke had been fairly visible in the R&B world thanks to funk gems like 'Reach for It' and 'Dukey Stick' when he ventured to Rio to record A Brazilian Love Affair, a superb date employing such greats as singers Flora Purim and Milton Nascimento and percussionist Airto Moreira. Although not the return to instrumental jazz some hoped it would be, this heartfelt effort does contain its share of jazz-influenced material."

== Track listing ==
All tracks are written by George Duke, except where noted.

No.	Title	Writer(s)	Length
1.	"Brazilian Love Affair"		7:24
2.	"Summer Breezin'"		4:50
3.	"Cravo E Canela"	Milton Nascimento; Ronaldo Bastos	3:06
4.	"Alone-6 AM"		1:07
5.	"Brazilian Sugar" (featuring Flora Purim)		5:34
6.	"Sugar Loaf Mountain"		4:10
7.	"Love Reborn"		4:28
8.	"Up from the Sea It Arose and Ate Rio in One Swift Bite"		5:24
9.	"I Need You Now" (featuring Simone)		4:43
10.	"Ao Que Vai Nascer" (featuring Milton Nascimento)	Milton Nascimento; Fernando Brant	3:29
Total length:			48:11

== Personnel ==
- George Duke – vocals (tracks: 1, 7), synthesizers (tracks: 1–3, 5–10), lead vocals (tracks: 2, 9), bells (track 2), electric pianos (tracks: 2, 7), acoustic piano (tracks: 4, 8), vibraphone (tracks: 5, 9)

Vocalists

- Lynn Blythe Davis – vocals (tracks: 2, 9)
- Josie James – vocals (tracks: 2, 9)
- Lúcia Maria Werner Vianna Lins – vocals (tracks: 3, 8)
- Flavio Faria – vocals (tracks: 3, 8)
- Zéluiz – vocals (tracks: 3, 8)
- Simone Bittencourt de Oliveira – lead vocals (track 9)
- Lúcia Maria Turnbull – vocals (track 3)
- Flora Purim – vocals (track 5)
- Milton Nascimento – vocals and acoustic guitar (tracks: 3, 10)

Instrumentalists

- Antônio Maurício Horta de Melo – acoustic guitar (tracks: 2, 5), electric guitar (tracks: 3, 10)
- Roland Bautista – guitar (track 1), electric guitar (tracks: 4, 6–9)
- Byron Lee Miller – bass (tracks: 1–2, 6–9)
- Jamil Joanes – bass (tracks: 3, 5, 10)
- Ricky Lawson – drums (tracks: 1, 6, 7, 9)
- Robertinho Silva – drums (tracks: 2, 3, 5, 8, 10), agogô (tracks: 3, 8), caxixi and talking drum (track 3), tambourine (track 8)
- Airto Moreira – percussion (tracks: 1, 10), surdo & tambourine (track 8)
- Chico Batera – percussion (tracks: 2, 5), congas and triangle (tracks: 3, 8), ganzá & reco-reco (track 3), bongos and tambourine (track 8), castanets (track 10)
- Sheila Escovedo – timbales (tracks: 6, 9), bongos and chimes (tracks: 7, 9), cowbell (track 7), caxixi (track 9)
- Larry Williams – tenor saxophone (track 2), alto saxophone (track 6)
- Jerry Hey – flugelhorn (tracks: 2, 10), trumpet (track 6)
- Bill Reichenbach, Jr. – trombone (tracks: 2, 6)
- Raul de Souza – trombone (track 5)
- Murray Adler – strings (track 10)

Production

- George Duke – producer, arrangements
- Kerry McNabb – engineer
- Mitch Gibson – assistant engineer
- Erik Zobler – assistant engineer
- Andy Mills – assistant engineer
- Jorge Luiz – assistant engineer
- Brian Gardner – mastering
- Bruce Heigh – production manager
- Julie Sayres – coordinator
- Vania Toledo – photography

== Chart history ==
Chart (1980)	Peak position
UK Albums (OCC)	33
US Billboard 200	119
US Top R&B/Hip-Hop Albums (Billboard)	40
