= Let Me Know You =

1982 studio album by Stanley Clarke

Studio album by Stanley Clarke
- Released: April 13, 1982
- Studio: Larrabee Sound Studios (Los Angeles, California)
- Genre: Jazz fusion; crossover jazz
- Length: 34:37
- Label: Epic
- Producer: Stanley Clarke

Stanley Clarke chronology
Rocks, Pebbles and Sand (1980)	Let Me Know You (1982)	Time Exposure (1984)

Professional ratings
Review scores
Source	Rating
AllMusic	1.5/5 stars

Let Me Know You is the eighth studio album by American bassist and record producer Stanley Clarke. It was released on April 13, 1982, through Epic Records. Recording sessions for the album took place at Larrabee Sound Studios in Los Angeles, California. The album features contributions from various musicians, including Darlene Love, David Lasley and Marcy Levy on backing vocals, Denzil "Broadway" Miller, Greg Phillinganes and Todd Cochran on keyboards, Michael Sembello and Carlos Santana on guitars, Paulinho da Costa on percussion, Leon "Ndugu" Chancler, Rick Shlosser, Steve Ferrone, Gordon Peeke and Roger Linn on drums.

The album peaked at number 114 on the US Billboard 200 and at number 25 on the Top R&B/Hip-Hop Albums chart.

== Track listing ==
All tracks are written by Stanley Clarke, except for track 7 written by Todd Cochran.

No.	Title	Length
1.	"Straight to the Top"	4:03
2.	"Let Me Know You"	4:39
3.	"You Are the One for Me"	4:50
4.	"I Just Want to Be Your Brother"	3:13
5.	"The Force of Love"	5:49
6.	"Play the Bass"	1:14
7.	"Secret to My Heart"	5:05
8.	"New York City"	5:44
Total length:		34:37

== Personnel ==
- Stanley Clarke – vocals (tracks: 1, 3–5, 7–8), bass (tracks: 1, 3, 5–8), piccolo bass (tracks: 1, 5, 7, 8), tenor bass (track 2), electric bass (tracks: 2, 4), solo bass (track 4), electric bass solo (track 7), guitar (tracks: 1, 3, 7, 8), sitar (track 3), Roland bass synthesizer (track 8), producer
- Darlene Love – backing vocals (tracks: 3, 5, 8)
- David Lasley – backing vocals (tracks: 3, 5, 8)
- Marcy Levy – backing vocals (tracks: 3, 5, 8)
- June Christopher – lyrics (track 3)
- Denzil A. Miller Jr. – acoustic piano (tracks: 1, 3, 5, 8), Fender Rhodes electric piano (track 3), Moog synthesizer (track 4), minimoog (track 8)
- Greg Phillinganes – Fender Rhodes electric piano (tracks: 2, 4), minimoog (track 7)
- Todd Cochran – Fender Rhodes electric piano (track 7)
- Michael Sembello – guitar (tracks: 2, 4, 5)
- Carlos Santana – guitar solo (tracks: 1, 4)
- Roger Linn – drums (track 1)
- Gordon Peeke – drums (track 1)
- Paulinho da Costa – drums (track 1), percussion (tracks: 2–3, 6–8)
- Rick Shlosser – drums (tracks: 2, 4)
- Steve Ferrone – drums (tracks: 3, 8)
- Leon "Ndugu" Chancler – drums (tracks: 5–7)
- Steve Forman – percussion (track 4)
- Steven Lederman – additional vocals effects (track 8)
- Armand Kaproff – cello (tracks: 2, 3, 5, 8)
- Douglas L. Davis – cello (tracks: 2, 3, 5, 8)
- Earl S. Madison – cello (tracks: 2, 3, 5, 8)
- Paula Hochhalter – cello (tracks: 2, 3, 5)
- Dorothy Remsen – harp (tracks: 2, 3, 5, 8)
- Charles C. Loper – trombone (tracks: 3, 5, 8)
- Dick Hyde – trombone (tracks: 3, 5, 8)
- George Bohanon – trombone (tracks: 3, 5, 8)
- Lewis Melvin McCreary – trombone (tracks: 3, 5, 8)
- Chuck Findley – trumpet (tracks: 3, 5, 8)
- Gary E. Grant – trumpet (tracks: 3, 5, 8)
- Jerry Hey – trumpet (tracks: 3, 5, 8)
- Larry G. Hall – trumpet (tracks: 3, 5, 8)
- Allan Harshman – viola (tracks: 2, 3, 5, 8)
- Janet Lakatos – viola (tracks: 2, 3, 5, 8)
- Joel Soultanian – viola (tracks: 2, 3, 5, 8)
- Roland Kato – viola (tracks: 2, 3, 5, 8)
- Rollice E. Dale – viola (tracks: 2, 3, 5, 8)
- Samuel Boghossian – viola (tracks: 2, 3, 5, 8)
- Alfred C. Brewning – violin (tracks: 2, 3, 5, 8)
- Charles Veal Jr. – violin (tracks: 2, 3, 5, 8)
- Daniel Shindaryov – violin (tracks: 2, 3, 5, 8)
- Endre Granat – violin (tracks: 2, 3, 5, 8)
- Gordon Howard Marron – violin (tracks: 2, 3, 5, 8)
- Harry Bluestone – violin (tracks: 2, 3, 5, 8)
- Ilkka Talvi – violin (tracks: 2, 3, 5, 8)
- Joy Lyle – violin (tracks: 2, 3, 5, 8)
- Nathan Kaproff – violin (tracks: 2, 3, 5, 8)
- Nathan Ross – violin (tracks: 2, 3, 5, 8)
- Paul Shure – violin (tracks: 2, 3, 5, 8)
- Tibor Zelig – violin (tracks: 2, 3, 5, 8)
- Vicky Sylvester – violin (tracks: 2, 3, 5, 8)
- Don Menza – woodwind (tracks: 3, 5, 8)
- Ernie Watts – woodwind (tracks: 3, 5, 8)
- Gary Lee Herbig – woodwind (tracks: 3, 5, 8)
- Jim Horn – woodwind (tracks: 3, 5, 8)

Technical

- Erik Zobler – mixing & recording
- Danny Kopelson – assistant mixing engineer
- Wally Buck – assistant mixing engineer
- Judy Clapp – assistant recording engineer
- Nyya Lark – assistant recording engineer
- Sabrina Buchanek – assistant recording engineer
- George Horn – mastering
- Bob Seidemann – photography

== Chart history ==
Chart (1982)	Peak position
US Billboard 200	114
US Top R&B/Hip-Hop Albums (Billboard)	25
