= Guardian of the Light =

1983 studio album by George Duke

Studio album by George Duke
- Released: 1983
- Studios: Le Gonks West (Hollywood, California); The Complex (Los Angeles, California); Ocean Way Recording (Los Angeles, California)
- Genres: Jazz pop; funk; soul; R&B
- Label: Epic
- Producer: George Duke

George Duke chronology
| Dream On (1979) | Guardian of the Light (1983) | Rendezvous (1984) |

Singles from Guardian of the Light
- 1. "Reach Out" Released: 1983; 2. "Celebrate" Released: 1983; 3. "Born to Love You" Released: 1983

Professional ratings
Review scores
| Source | Rating |
|---|---|
| AllMusic | 2.5/5 stars |

Guardian of the Light is the sixteenth studio album by American keyboardist and record producer George Duke. It was released in 1983 through Epic Records. Recording sessions for the album took place in Los Angeles at The Complex, Le Gonks West, and Ocean Way Recording. Duke used a variety of keyboard instruments, such as Rhodes electric piano, Sequential Circuits Prophet-5, Korg Polysix, ARP Odyssey, Clavitar Solo, Minimoog, melodeon, melodica, and also Sennheiser and Roland vocoders, and LinnDrum machine. The album features contributions from various musicians, including vocalists Jeffrey Osborne and Lynn Davis, guitarists Michael Sembello and Charles Fearing, bassists Louis Johnson and Byron Miller, drummers John Robinson and Leon "Ndugu" Chancler, percussionist Paulinho da Costa, trumpeters Gary Grant and Jerry Hey, trombonist Lew McCreary, conductor George Del Barrio with a musical ensemble of string instrument players.

The album peaked at number 147 on the Billboard 200 Albums chart and number 46 on the Top R&B/Hip-Hop Albums chart in the United States. Guardian of the Light spawned three singles: "Reach Out", "Celebrate" and "Born to Love You". Its lead single, "Reach Out" reached number 59 on the Hot R&B/Hip-Hop Songs chart.

== Track listing ==
All tracks are written by George Duke.

| No. | Title | Length |
|---|---|---|
| 1. | "Overture" | 1:38 |
| 2. | "Light" | 3:23 |
| 3. | "Shane" | 3:14 |
| 4. | "Born to Love You" | 3:10 |
| 5. | "Silly Fightin'" | 5:06 |
| 6. | "You (Are the Light)" | 4:15 |
| 7. | "The War Fugue Interlude" | 1:13 |
| 8. | "Reach Out" | 4:57 |
| 9. | "Give Me Your Love" | 4:19 |
| 10. | "Stand" | 2:14 |
| 11. | "Soon" | 2:43 |
| 12. | "Celebrate" | 3:54 |
| 13. | "Fly Away" | 4:01 |

== Personnel ==
- George Duke – vocals (tracks: 2, 3, 6, 8, 11, 13), lead vocals (tracks: 4, 5, 9), backing vocals (tracks: 5, 9), acoustic piano (tracks: 1–6, 8, 13), Sennheiser vocoder (tracks: 2, 3), Sequential Circuits Prophet-5 (tracks: 2, 3, 7–9, 12, 13), Korg Polysix (tracks: 2, 10, 12), Rhodes electric piano (tracks: 3, 4, 6, 9, 12), melodica (track 4), ARP Odyssey and handclaps (track 8), melodeon (track 9), LinnDrum and Minimoog (tracks: 10, 12), Clavitar Solo and Roland vocoder (track 13), liner notes, producer
- Jeffrey Osborne – backing vocals (tracks: 4, 5), vocals (track 10)
- Lynn Davis – backing vocals (tracks: 4, 5, 9), handclaps (track 8)
- Portia Griffin – backing vocals (tracks: 4, 5), handclaps (track 8)
- Patti Austin – backing vocals (track 9)
- Erik Zobler – vocals (track 13)
- Michael Sembello – guitar (tracks: 1, 4, 6, 8, 9, 11)
- Charles Fearing – guitar (tracks: 2, 3)
- Johnny McGhee – guitar (track 12)
- Louis Johnson – guitar (track 5), bass (tracks: 1–3, 5, 8, 9, 13)
- Byron Lee Miller – bass (tracks: 4, 6)
- John Robinson – drums (tracks: 1–4, 8, 9)
- Leon "Ndugu" Chancler – drums (tracks: 5, 6, 13)
- Paulinho da Costa – percussion (tracks: 1, 3, 4, 6)
- Steve Forman – tabla (track 11)
- Larry Bunker – timpani (track 13)
- Rachelle Fields – handclaps (track 8)
- Larry Williams – tenor saxophone (tracks: 1, 6, 8)
- Lew McCreary – trombone (tracks: 1, 6, 8)
- Gary Grant – trumpet (tracks: 1, 8, 13), flugelhorn (track 6), piccolo trumpet (track 13)
- Jerry Hey – trumpet (tracks: 1, 8, 13), flugelhorn (track 6), piccolo trumpet (track 13)
- Craig Harris – vocoder programming (tracks: 2, 3)
- Paul Shure – violin, concertmaster (tracks: 1, 2, 6–8, 11)
- Charles Veal Jr. – violin, concertmaster (track 13)
- Sherrill Coltrin Baptist – violin
- Marcia Van Dyke – violin
- Israel Baker – violin
- Endre Granat – violin
- Franklin Foster – violin
- Arnold Belnick – violin
- Bonnie Douglas – violin
- Brenton Banks – violin
- Ronald Folsom – violin
- Reginald Hill – violin
- Sheldon Sanov – violin
- Robert Sushel – violin
- Kenneth Yerke – violin
- Murray Adler – violin
- Mari Botnick – violin
- Henry Ferber – violin
- Dorothy Wade – violin
- Karen Jones – violin
- Nathan Ross – violin
- Carol Shive – violin
- Assa Drori – violin
- Bob Sanov – violin
- David Schwartz – viola
- Virginia Majewski – viola
- Barbara Thomason – viola
- Allan Harshman – viola
- Denyse Buffum – viola
- Rollice Dale – viola
- Myer Bello – viola
- Raymond Kelley – cello
- Daniel Rothmuller – cello
- Douglas L. Davis – cello
- Paula Hochhalter – cello
- Julianna Buffum – cello
- Dennis Karmazyn – cello
- Earl Madison – cello
- Nils Oliver – cello
- Jan Kelley – cello
- George Del Barrio – conducting (tracks: 1, 2, 6–8, 11)

Technical

- Tommy Vicari – engineering
- Mark Ettel – assistant recording engineer (tracks: 1–11)
- Nick Spigel – assistant recording engineer
- Peter Chaikin – additional recording (track 12)
- Danny Kopelson – assistant mixing engineer (tracks: 1–11, 13)
- Wally Buck – assistant mixing engineer (tracks: 1–11, 13)
- Steve Schmidt – assistant mixing engineer (track 10)
- Brian Gardner – mastering

== Covers ==
- "Born to Love You" was covered by Phil Perry in 1998.

== Chart history ==
| Chart (1983) | Peak position |
|---|---|
| Swedish Albums (Sverigetopplistan) | 36 |
| US Billboard 200 | 147 |
| US Top R&B/Hip-Hop Albums (Billboard) | 46 |
| US Jazz Albums (Billboard) | 17 |
