= Pageant of the Masters =

Annual arts festival in California

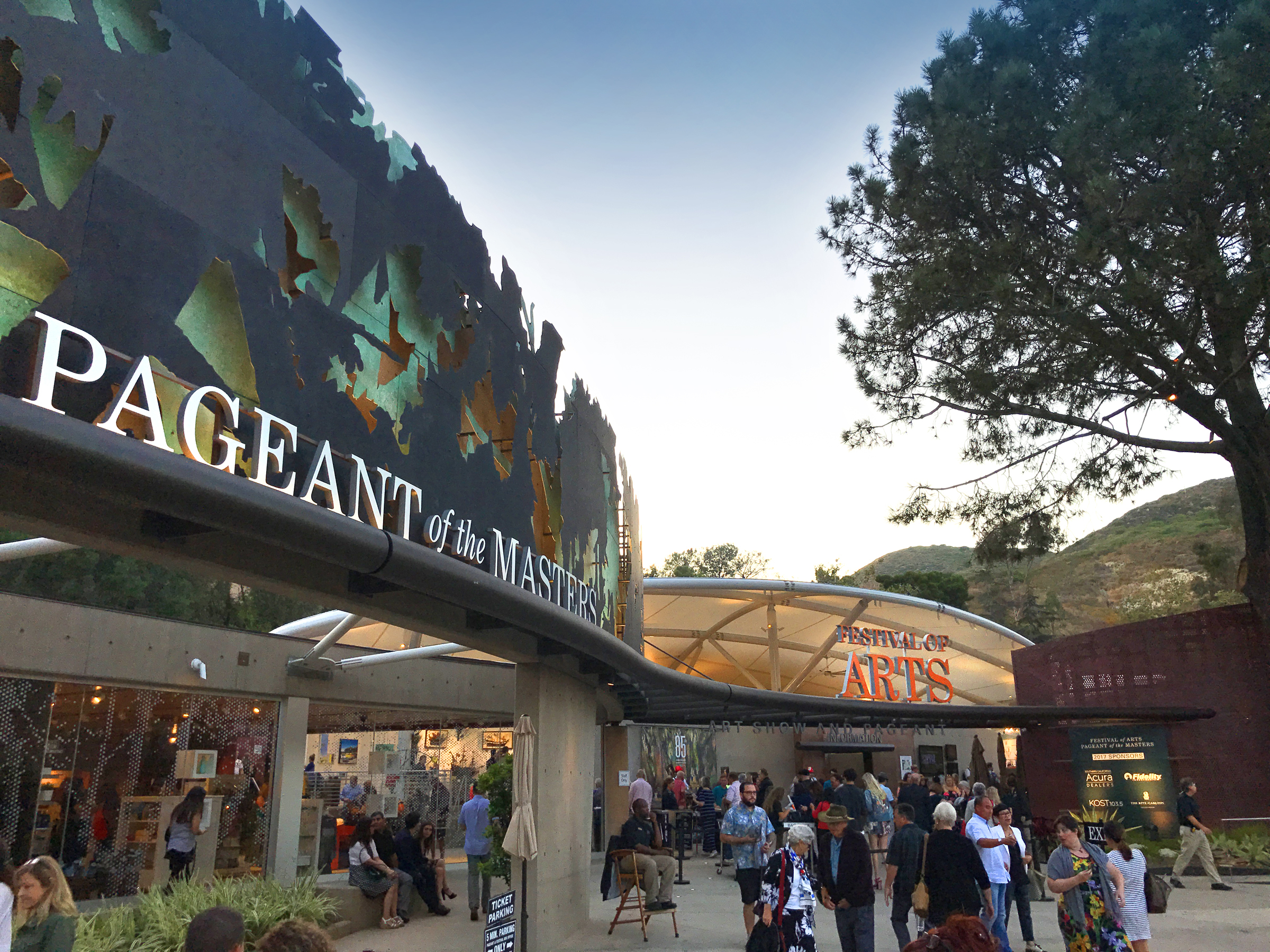
- Entrance to the Pageant of the Masters and Festival of Arts Fine Art Show
- Status: Active
- Genre: Festival
- Begins: July 5
- Ends: August 29
- Frequency: Annually
- Locations: Laguna Beach, California, United States
- Country: United States
- Inaugurated: 1933
- Most recent: 2025

The Pageant of the Masters is an annual festival held by the Festival of Arts in Laguna Beach, California, United States.

The event is known for its tableaux vivants or "living pictures" in which classical and contemporary works of art are recreated by real people who are made to look nearly identical to the originals through the clever application of costumes, makeup, headdresses, lighting, props, and backdrops.

The first Festival of Arts was produced in 1932, and the first presentation of the Pageant was done in 1933. Since then, the two events have been held each summer, apart from a four-year interruption caused by World War II, and another one-year interruption in 2020 caused by the COVID-19 pandemic.

The 92nd season of the Pageant of the Masters opened on July 5, 2025, and ran until August 29, 2025. The pageant hosts more than a quarter million people each year.

== History ==
In 1933, at the second Festival of Arts, artist Lolita Perine had an idea for a living work of art. Persuading residents of Laguna Beach to dress in costume, she seated them behind an oversized frame, recreating well-known works of art. The "Spirit of the Masters Pageant" was formally started the next year by the Festival's organizers and was put on again in 1934, but in those early days was an amateur operation of low quality.

In 1934, local developer Roy Ropp expressed his dissatisfaction with the poor quality of the production in blunt terms; the Festival's board responded to his frank criticism by placing him in charge of the Pageant. He renamed it the "Pageant of the Masters" and with the assistance of his wife, Marie, he organized a high-quality and well-received production in the summer of 1935.

Building upon this initial success, the Ropps continued to refine and improve the Pageant through its 1941 production; then the Festival and Pageant were suspended for four years due to World War II. Because of increasing personal friction between the Ropps and the Festival's board, Roy Ropp came back only once after the war to direct the Pageant, in 1950. Ropp died in 1974, but today is still remembered as the "Father of the Pageant."

The Pageant was cancelled in 2020 due to COVID-19.

== Pageant ==
The Pageant is held eight weeks each summer and consists of 90 minutes of "living pictures" accompanied by a professional narrator, an orchestra, and period songs by professional vocalists.

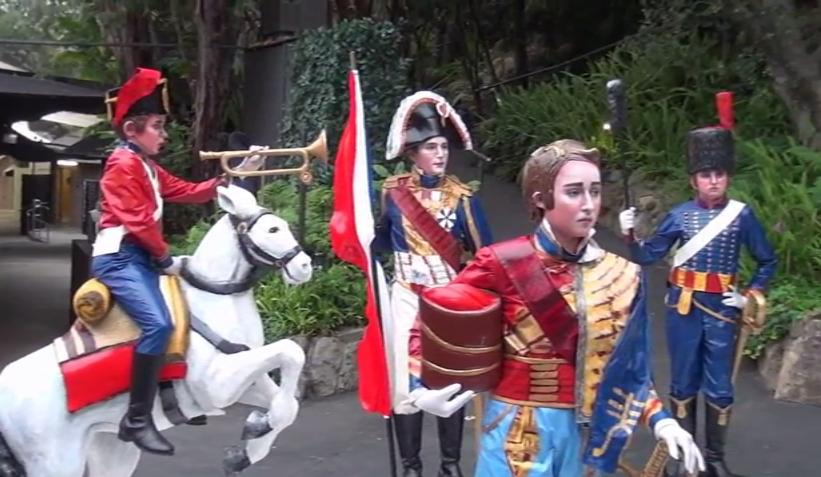
A Pageant of the Masters recreation of the Waterloo chess set, from 2012

The Pageant is put on by a small paid staff and several hundred volunteers. Production begins in January with auditions and casting of volunteers from all over Southern California; it takes over 60,000 volunteer hours to put on the two-month Pageant in July and August. Today, the costumes and makeup involved are very elaborate and often require large commitments of volunteer time, so to reduce the impact on individual volunteers, the Pageant selects two full casts known as Blue and Green, which then alternate back and forth.

== Recognition ==
In 2014, The New York Times summarized the event by stating:

"The pageant is hard to describe, because it is — in a strict sense — unique: There is nothing else in the world like it."

== Popular culture ==
- The Pageant of the Masters was parodied in the Arrested Development episode "In God We Trust".
- The festival was imitated in Gilmore Girls episode "The Festival of Living Art", for which the show won an Emmy Award.
- The festival was featured on the fifth episode of Somebody's Gotta Do It with Mike Rowe.
