= Norman St. Clair =

English-born American painter and architect

- Born: 1865; England
- Died: March 6, 1912 (aged 46–47); Pasadena, California, U.S.
- Occupation: Painter

Norman St. Clair (1865 - March 6, 1912) was a British-born American architect and painter. Born in England, he lived in Boston before opening a studio in Pasadena, California, where he painted many watercolors. He was also an architect, although he spent the remaining decade of his life dedicating himself to his paintings. By the time of his death, St. Clair had become "one of Southern California's best known artists."
