= Sweet Baby (Stanley Clarke and George Duke song) =

Single by Stanley Clarke & George Duke

from the album The Clarke/Duke Project
- B-side: "Never Judge a Cover By Its Book"
- Released: April 1981
- Genre: Jazz fusion; adult contemporary
- Length: 3:46
- Label: Epic; CBS
- Songwriter: George Duke
- Producers: George Duke; Stanley Clarke

Stanley Clarke & George Duke singles chronology
"Sweet Baby" (1981)	"Louie Louie" (1981)

Music video
- "Sweet Baby" on YouTube

"Sweet Baby" is a song by American musicians George Duke and Stanley Clarke. It was released in 1981 as the first single of their collaborative debut album The Clarke/Duke Project. Reaching a peak position of No. 19 on the US Billboard Hot 100, the single remained on the chart for a total of twenty weeks. On the Hot R&B/Hip-Hop Songs chart, "Sweet Baby" reached No. 6. The song is also noteworthy for its use of the electric sitar. During concert performances, Duke performed the song with American singer Lynn Davis. Their version appears on Duke's concert DVD Live in Tokyo Japan 1983.

Al Jarreau and Lalah Hathaway recorded the song for 2014 tribute album My Old Friend: Celebrating George Duke.

== Track listing ==
7", Vinyl
No.	Title	Writer(s)	Length
1.	"Sweet Baby"	George Duke	3:46
2.	"Never Judge a Cover By Its Book"	Stanley Clarke	1:43

== Charts ==
Chart (1981)	Peak position
US Billboard Hot 100	19
US Adult Contemporary (Billboard)	16
US Hot R&B/Hip-Hop Songs (Billboard)	6

Year-end chart (1981)	Rank
US Top Pop Singles (Billboard)	78
