= Reach for It =

1977 studio album by George Duke

Studio album by George Duke
- Released: 1977
- Studios: Paramount (Los Angeles, California)
- Genre: Jazz-funk
- Length: 37:17
- Label: Epic
- Producer: George Duke

George Duke chronology
From Me to You (1977)	Reach for It (1977)	The Dream (1978)

Singles from Reach for It
- 1. "Reach for It" Released: 1977

Professional ratings
Review scores
Source	Rating
AllMusic	3/5 stars
The Encyclopedia of Popular Music	3/5 stars
The Rolling Stone Album Guide	1.5/5 stars

Reach for It is a studio album by the American keyboardist and record producer George Duke. It was recorded at Paramount Recording Studios in Los Angeles, California, and released in 1977 through Epic Records. The album peaked at number 25 on the US Billboard Top LPs & Tape chart and number 4 on the Top Soul LPs chart. It was certified Gold by Recording Industry Association of America on January 18, 1978.

Its only single, the title track, peaked at number 54 on the US Billboard Hot 100 and number 2 on the Hot Soul Singles chart.

== Track listing ==
No.	Title	Writer(s)	Length
1.	"The Beginning"	George Duke	1:50
2.	"Lemme at It"	Duke	4:13
3.	"Hot Fire"	Leon Chancler	5:31
4.	"Reach for It"	Duke; Chancler; Charles Foster Johnson; Byron Miller	4:53
5.	"Just for You"	Duke	4:28
6.	"Omi" (Fresh Water)	Duke	4:50
7.	"Searchin' My Mind"	Duke	3:11
8.	"Watch Out Baby!"	Duke; Chancler; Michael Sembello; Stanley Clarke	5:25
9.	"Diamonds"	Duke	6:45
10.	"The End"	Duke	1:07
11.	"Bring It on Home"		4:25
Total length:			37:17

== Personnel ==
- George Duke – keyboards, vocals
- Charles "Icarus" Johnson – guitar, vocals (4, 9)
- Michael Sembello – guitar (8)
- Byron Miller – bass (4)
- Stanley Clarke – bass (8)
- Leon "Ndugu" Chancler – drums, rototoms, timbales, vocals (4, 8)
- Manolo Badrena – congas, bongos, percussion
- Raul De Souza – trombone (6)
- Dee Henrichs – vocals
- Sybil Thomas – vocals
- Deborah Thomas – vocals

=== Production ===
- George Duke – producer
- Kerry McNabb – engineer
- John Golden – mastering at Kendun Recorders (Burbank, California).
- Glen Christensen – art direction
- Norman Seeff – photography

== Charts ==
=== Weekly charts ===
Chart (1977)	Peak position
US Billboard 200	25
US Top R&B/Hip-Hop Albums (Billboard)	4

=== Year-end charts ===
Chart (1978)	Position
US Top R&B/Hip-Hop Albums (Billboard)	41

== Certifications ==
Region	Certification	Certified units/sales
United States (RIAA)	Gold	500,000^{^}
^{^} Shipments figures based on certification alone.
