= Robert Brookins =

American singer (1962–2009)

- Born: Robert Franklin Brookins Jr. October 7, 1962
- Origin: Sacramento, California, U.S.
- Died: April 15, 2009 (aged 46)
- Occupations: Singer; songwriter; producer
- Instruments: Keyboards; drums
- Years active: 1979–2009
- Labels: ARC; Columbia; MCA
- Formerly of: Earth, Wind & Fire

Robert Brookins (October 7, 1962 – April 15, 2009) was an American singer, songwriter, producer and musician. A member of the band Earth, Wind & Fire he also worked with artists such as George Duke, Stephanie Mills, Stanley Clarke and The Whispers.

== Early years ==
Brookins grew up in Del Paso Heights, Sacramento, California. Singing, and playing keyboard and drums as a child, he formed his first band, aged 11, Little Robert & the Fondeles, which won the Motown's Soul Search Contest in 1974. Brookins was also an alumnus of Grant Union High School.

== Musical career ==
In Our Lives
An audio sample of "In Our Lives" (released 1986)

Brookins later formed a group with his brother Michael known as Afterbach. The duo issued a critically acclaimed album entitled Matinee in 1981 on Maurice White's ARC Records, an imprint of Columbia Records. After such he performed as a keyboardist on Philip Bailey's 1983 album Continuation as well as Ramsey Lewis and Nancy Wilson's 1984 album The Two of Us.

Brookins then composed on Deniece Williams 1984 album Let's Hear It for the Boy and The Isley Brothers' 1985 LP Masterpiece. He also made a guest appearance on Stanley Clarke's 1985 LP Find Out!, and on George Duke's 1985 album Thief in the Night. He then composed on Rebbie Jackson's 1986 LP Reaction and Al Jarreau's 1986 album L Is for Lover.

During 1986, he released his debut solo album entitled In the Night. While the album itself did not chart on the Billboard 200, it did feature the minor R&B singles chart hit, "In Our Lives", and a follow-up single, "Come to Me" also received airplay, supported by a music video featuring Laurence Fishburne and Tracy Camilla Johns. That same year, Brookins performed on Stanley Clarke's and George Duke's respective follow-up albums – Clarke's Hideaway and Duke's self titled LP. He went on to produce Bobby Brown on his 1986 debut album King of Stage.

The following year, Brookins produced for Stephanie Mills on her 1987 LP If I Were Your Woman. Featuring four top-20 R&B chart singles (including two number ones and another top-ten), If I Were Your Woman has since been certified Gold in the US by the RIAA. He also composed on Nancy Wilson's 1987 album Forbidden Lover.

In 1988, Brookins released his second solo album, Let It Be Me, featuring the top-20 R&B cover of the Roberta Flack and Donny Hathaway classic "Where Is the Love?" (a duet with Stephanie Mills) and the top-40 follow-up hit, "Don't Tease Me". He worked as a songwriter and producer on Jeffrey Osborne's 1988 LP One Love-One Dream and Jackie Jackson's 1988 album Be the One. Later in the year, Brookins performed on George Howard's 1988 album Reflections and the following year, produced Christopher Williams on his 1989 LP Adventures in Paradise. Brookins also produced The Whispers' on their 1989 album More of the Night. More of the Night has been certified Gold in the US by the RIAA. He later produced Michael Cooper on his 1989 LP Just What I Like and Jeffrey Osborne on his 1990 album Only Human.

Brookins went on to collaborate with the band Earth, Wind & Fire on their 1990 album Heritage. He later featured on Stanley Clarke and George Duke's 1990 LP 3 and produced Keisha Jackson's 1991 self titled album.

Brookins went on to play on Wayman Tisdale's 1995 LP Power Forward and produced Tisdale's 1996 album In the Zone. In the Zone reached No. 7 on the Billboard Contemporary Jazz Albums chart and No. 9 on the Billboard Jazz Albums chart. He later appeared on George Duke's 2000 LP Cool. He also became Earth, Wind & Fire's keyboardist and musical director. He went to perform on the band's 2003 album The Promise.

== Death and legacy ==
Writing for AllMusic, Andrew Hamilton said: "The often overused term multi-talented is true to its definition when referring to Robert F. Brookins."

On April 15, 2009 Brookins died from a heart attack. He was survived by a son. Since his death, an annual concert has been held in Sacramento in his honour. In 2019, the city's Nuevo Park was renamed Robert Brookins Park.

== Solo discography ==
=== Albums ===
==== Studio albums ====
Year	Title	Peak chart positions	Record label
Year	Title	US R&B	Record label
1986	In the Night	—	MCA
1988	Let It Be Me	37	MCA
2002	Something You Can Make Love To	—	MusicSoft Works
"—" denotes releases that did not chart.

=== Singles ===
Year	Title	Peak chart positions	Record label
Year	Title	US R&B	Record label
1986	"Our Lives"	95	MCA
1987	"If You Only Knew"	—	MCA
1987	"Come to Me"	—	MCA
1988	"Where Is the Love" (with Stephanie Mills)	18	MCA
1989	"Don't Tease Me"	39	MCA
"—" denotes releases that did not chart.
