= Emotional (Jeffrey Osborne album) =

Studio album by Jeffrey Osborne
- Released: May 27, 1986
- Recorded: 1985–1986
- Studios: Lion Share Studios, The Complex, Studio 55 and Record One (Los Angeles, California); Fantasy Studios (Berkeley, California); Music Grinder Studios, Baby'O Recorders and Le Gonks West (Hollywood, California); Devonshire Sound Studios (North Hollywood, California); The Hit Factory (New York City, New York)
- Genres: Funk; soul
- Length: 44:18
- Label: A&M
- Producers: T.C. Campbell; George Duke; Michael Masser; Frank Musker; Jeffrey Osborne; Richard Perry; Hamish Stuart; Rod Temperton

Jeffrey Osborne chronology
Don't Stop (1984)	Emotional (1986)	One Love – One Dream (1988)

Emotional is the fourth album by American singer Jeffrey Osborne. It was released by A&M Records on May 27, 1986. Produced by Osborne, Rod Temperton, Richard Perry, T. C. Campbell, Michael Masser, and George Duke, Emotional reached number five on the US Billboard R&B Albums chart and number 27 on the Billboard 200. It spawned one of Osborne's biggest pop hits, "You Should Be Mine (The Woo Woo Song)" which peaked at number 13 on the US Billboard Hot 100. Other tracks that charted include "In Your Eyes", "Soweto", and "Room with a View."

== Critical reception ==
Professional ratings
Review scores
Source	Rating
AllMusic	1.5/5 stars
The Village Voice	B

AllMusic editor Jason Elias, who had praised previous albums by Osborne, called it "quite a disappointment" and "not exactly a work of cohesion." He found that Emotional "is overly slick with poor song choices and barely there vocals" and compared it to Whitney Houston's early material "with its use of multiple producers and pop material." Connie Johnson from Los Angeles Times felt that "while lacking a blockbuster [...] this album is well-balanced in its blend of exuberant, up-tempo cuts and heart-rending love songs. Simplicity would have gotten the point across far better. Still, in his bid for a broader audience, Osborne hasn’t sacrificed all of the soul basics."

== Track listing ==
No.	Title	Writer(s)	Producer(s)	Length
1.	"We Belong to Love"	Rod Temperton	Temperton; Jeffrey Osborne	4:35
2.	"You Should Be Mine (The Woo Woo Song)"	Andy Goldmark; Bruce Roberts	Richard Perry	4:26
3.	"Soweto"	Elizabeth Lamers; Frank Musker; Hamish Stuart	Musker; Stuart; Osborne	4:54
4.	"In Your Eyes"	Dan Hill; Michael Masser	Masser	3:16
5.	"Room with a View"	Adrienne Anderson; Eddie Schwartz	Perry	4:07
6.	"Who Would Have Guessed"	T.C. Campbell; Osborne	Campbell; Osborne	5:02
7.	"Emotional"	David Bryant; Diane Warren	Perry	4:36
8.	"A Second Chance"	George Duke; Randy Goodrum; Osborne	Duke	4:38
9.	"Love's Not Ready"	T.C. Campbell; Osborne	Campbell; Osborne	4:01
10.	"Come Midnight"	T.C. Campbell; Osborne	Campbell; Osborne	4:56

== Personnel ==
Performers and Musicians

- Jeffrey Osborne – lead vocals, backing vocals, percussion (9)
- Bobby Lyle – keyboards (1)
- T.C. Campbell – keyboard solo (1), keyboards (3, 6, 9, 10), synthesizers (10)
- Andy Goldmark – synthesizers (2), drum programming (2)
- Bruce Roberts – synthesizers (2), drum programming (2)
- Robbie Buchanan – additional synthesizers (2), electric piano (4)
- Jeff Lorber – additional synthesizers (2), synth solo (7), guitars (7), drum programming (7)
- Hamish Stuart – keyboards (3), synth solo (3), guitar solo (3), backing vocals (3)
- Bob Moore – keyboards (3)
- Randy Kerber – acoustic piano (4)
- Bill Payne – acoustic piano (5)
- David Tyson – synthesizers (5), drum programming (5)
- Steve George – additional synthesizers (5)
- Howie Rice – additional synthesizers (5)
- Steve Mitchell – additional synthesizers (5), synthesizers (7), drum programming (7)
- George Duke – Yamaha DX7 (8), Synclavier (8)
- Paul Jackson Jr. – guitars (1, 2, 4, 9)
- Dann Huff – guitars (2, 5)
- Charles Fearing – guitars (5, 6)
- Chuck Gentry – guitars (8)
- Maitland Ward – guitars (9, 10)
- Freddie Washington – bass (1)
- Nathan East – bass (4, 5, 7)
- Byron Miller – bass (10)
- John Robinson – drums (1, 2, 4, 6, 8), tom-tom fills (9), brushes (9)
- Rod Temperton – Roland TR-808 (1)
- Ricky Lawson – drums (3, 9, 10)
- Paul Fox – drum programming (5)
- Eddie Schwartz – drum programming (5)
- Paulinho da Costa – percussion (2, 5, 7)
- Michael Masser – arrangements (4)
- Gene Page – arrangements (4)
- Alex Brown – backing vocals (1, 2, 10)
- Portia Griffin – backing vocals (1, 3, 6, 8, 10), lead vocals (6)
- Joyce Kennedy – backing vocals (1)
- Marcy Levy – backing vocals (1)
- Vesta Williams – backing vocals (1)
- Bunny Hull – backing vocals (2)
- Stephanie Spruill – backing vocals (2)
- Yolanda Davis – backing vocals (3, 6, 10)
- Kevin Dorsey – backing vocals (3)
- Lynette Hawkins – backing vocals (5, 7)
- Tramaine Hawkins – backing vocals (5, 7)
- Michelle Jordan – backing vocals (5)
- Jeanie Tracy – backing vocals (5, 7)
- Walter Hawkins – backing vocals (7)
- Lynn Davis – backing vocals (8)

Handclaps on "We Belong to Love"

- Bobby Lyle
- Jeffrey Osborne
- John Robinson
- Rod Temperton
- Freddie Washington

Children's choir on "Soweto"

- Marta Woodhull – choir director
- Monica Calhan, David Chan, Kelly Chan, Kristina Chan, Susan Guzman, Michelle Poston, Becky Ramirez, Jessica Robertson, Teri Robin, Andrea Scott, Tasha Scott, Veronique Vicari, Angela White and Christopher White – choir

Production and Technical

- Jeffrey Osborne – producer (1, 3, 6, 9, 10)
- Rod Temperton – producer (1)
- Richard Perry – producer (2, 5, 7)
- Andy Goldmark – co-producer (2)
- Bruce Roberts – co-producer (2)
- Frank Musker – co-producer (3)
- Hamish Stuart – co-producer (3)
- Michael Masser – producer (4)
- T.C. Campbell – producer (6, 9, 10)
- George Duke – producer (8)
- Bradford Rosenberger – production coordinator (2, 5, 7)
- Alice Murrell – production assistant (8)
- Thaddeus Edwards – album production assistant
- Tommy Vicari – recording (1, 3, 6, 9, 10), mixing (1, 3, 4, 6, 8–10), remix engineer (2, 5, 7)
- John Boghosian – recording (2, 5, 7)
- Michael Brooks – recording (2, 5, 7)
- Phil Moores – recording (3)
- Dean Burt – recording (4)
- Michael Mancini – recording (4)
- Erik Zobler – recording (8)
- Larry Ferguson – additional engineer (1, 3, 6, 9, 10)
- Khaliq Glover – additional engineer (1, 3, 6, 9, 10)
- David Luke – additional engineer (1, 2, 3, 5, 7)
- Sharon Rice – additional engineer (1, 9, 10)
- Wally Buck – additional engineer (2, 5, 7)
- Glen Holguin – additional engineer (2, 5, 7), assistant engineer (2, 5, 7)
- Jay Rifkin – additional engineer (2, 5, 7)
- Ernie Sheesley – additional engineer (2, 5, 7)
- Laura Livingston – additional engineer (6)
- Ken Fowler – additional engineer (9)
- Julie Last – assistant engineer (2, 5, 7)
- Craig Miller – assistant engineer (2, 5, 7)
- Mitch Gibson – assistant engineer (8)
- Ralph Sutton – mix assistant (4)
- Mixbusters – album remixing
- Brian Gardner – mastering at Bernie Grundman Mastering (Hollywood, California)
- Bradford Rosenberger – production coordinator (2, 5, 7)
- Alice Murrell – production assistant (8)
- Thaddeus Edwards – album production assistant
- Chuck Beeson – art direction, design
- Bonnie Schiffman – photography
- Ton Sur Ton – wardrobe
- Jack Nelson & Associates – management

== Charts ==
=== Weekly charts ===
Chart (1986)	Peak position
Canada Top Albums/CDs (RPM)	81
US Billboard 200	26
US Top R&B/Hip-Hop Albums (Billboard)	5

=== Year-end charts ===
Chart (1986)	Position
US Top R&B/Hip-Hop Albums (Billboard)	33

== Certifications ==
Region	Certification	Certified units/sales
United States (RIAA)	Gold	500,000^{^}
^{^} Shipments figures based on certification alone.
