= Mother's Finest (1972 album) =

Studio album by Mother's Finest
- Released: 1972
- Recorded: 1972
- Studio: Century Sound Studios, New York City
- Genre: Funk rock
- Length: 34:40
- Label: RCA
- Producer: Hank Medress and Dave Appell

Mother's Finest chronology
Mother's Finest (1972)	Mother's Finest (1976)

Mother's Finest is the official debut album by Atlanta group Mother's Finest. It was released in 1972 on RCA Records, followed by a single, "You Move Me" b/w "Dear Sir and Brother Mann," but neither the album or single made the Billboard charts. The band was disappointed with the album, claiming that RCA added "instrumental sweetening" without their consent. Despite sessions for a second album, they were later dropped by RCA.

The album was released on CD by Wounded Bird Records in 2010 as part of a two-disc package that also included the band's 1973 unreleased second RCA album, their 1976 Epic Records debut, also titled Mother's Finest, and the single edit of "Thank You for the Love" from their 1977 Epic release, Another Mother Further. Both the vinyl and CD editions are out of print.

British label SoulMusic Records included "You Move Me" and "Dear Sir and Brother Mann" from the 1972 debut and "Monster People", "Bone Song", "Living Hero", "Middle of the Night", "Funky Mountain" and "Run Joe" from the unreleased second RCA album on their 2-disc Love Changes: The Anthology 1972 - 1983 set, released in March 2017.

"Doncha Wanna Love Me" and "My Baby", the two songs from the second unreleased RCA album left off Love Changes: The Anthology 1972 - 1983, were re-recorded by the band and included on their 1976 eponymous debut album for Epic Records. The song "It's What You Do with What You Got" was re-worked by the band and turned into the controversial "Niggizz Can't Sang Rock & Roll", found on Mother's Finest self-titled 1976 debut album for Epic Records.

== Track listing ==
1. "Love Is All I Need (It's Too Hard to Carry On)" (Jerry Seay, Joyce Kennedy) - 3:44
2. "You Move Me" (Glenn Murdock, Mike Keck) - 4:01
3. "You'll Like It 'Hear'" (Keck) 4:35
4. "Dear Sir and Brother Mann" (Gary Moore, Murdock) - 3:39
5. "Feelin' Alright" (Dave Mason) - 4:32
6. "It's What You Do with What You Got" (Jeff Barry, Bobby Bloom) - 3:38
7. "Sweeten the Air You Breathe" (Keck) - 3:09
8. "You Make Me Feel So Good" (Murdock, Kennedy) - 4:03
9. "Love the One You're With" (Stephen Stills) - 3:19

== Personnel ==
Mother's Finest

- Joyce Kennedy – lead & backing vocals, percussion
- Glenn Murdock – lead & backing vocals, percussion
- Mike Keck – keyboards, background vocals
- Jerry Seay – bass
- Gary Moore – guitars
- Donny Vosburgh - drums

Production

- Produced by Hank Medress and Dave Appell
- Recorded at Century Sound, New York
- Engineered by Bill Radice and thanks to Tom Coleman
