= You Should Be Mine =

You Should Be Mine may refer to:

- "You Should Be Mine (Don't Waste Your Time)", a 1997 song by Brian McKnight
- "You Should Be Mine (The Woo Woo Song)", a 1986 song by Jeffrey Osborne

== See also ==
- You Could Be Mine
