= Don't Stop (Jeffrey Osborne album) =

Studio album by Jeffrey Osborne
- Released: September 21, 1984
- Recorded: February 1984–July 1984
- Studios: The Complex and Foot On The Hill Studio (Los Angeles, California); Ocean Way Recording, Le Gonks West and Soundcastle (Hollywood, California); Fantasy Studios (Berkeley, California)
- Genres: R&B, pop
- Length: 40:40
- Label: A&M
- Producer: George Duke

Jeffrey Osborne chronology
Stay with Me Tonight (1983)	Don't Stop (1984)	Emotional (1986)

Don't Stop is the third solo album by Jeffrey Osborne, released on September 21, 1984.

== Reception ==
Professional ratings
Review scores
Source	Rating
AllMusic	3/5 stars
Gannett	(favourable)
People	(favourable)
The Village Voice	B+

The album reached #39 on the Billboard 200 albums chart and #7 on the R&B album chart. The title song as well as the two other singles, "The Borderlines" and "Let Me Know", all reached #6, #7, and #44 on the R&B Singles Chart.

== Track listing ==
1. "Don't Stop" (David Batteau, Danny Sembello) - 4:09
2. "Let Me Know" (Geoffrey Brillhart Leib, Jeffrey Osborne) - 5:26
3. "The Borderlines" (Raymond Jones) - 5:27
4. "The Power" (Don Freeman, Warren Giancaterino, Jeffrey Osborne) - 4:51
5. "Is It Right" (Jeffrey Osborne, David Wolinski) - 4:46
6. "You Can't Be Serious" (Don Freeman, Jeffrey Osborne) - 4:37
7. "Crazy 'Bout Cha" (Don Freeman, Jeffrey Osborne) - 3:31
8. "Hot Coals" (Don Freeman, Jeffrey Osborne) - 3:27
9. "Live for Today" (David Batteau, Don Freeman, Jeffrey Osborne) - 4:26

== Personnel ==
Information is based on the album's Liner Notes Singers and Musicians

- Jeffrey Osborne – lead vocals, backing vocals (1–8), E-mu Emulator (3), drum machine programming (4, 9)
- George Duke – Polymoog (1), Prophet-5 (1, 5–7), acoustic piano (2), Yamaha PF10 digital piano (2), Memorymoog (2, 7), synth solo (2, 6), E-mu Emulator (3), backing vocals (3), Moog bass (6), Rhodes piano (7), Yamaha DX7 (7)
- Danny Sembello – Roland Jupiter-8 (1), Yamaha DX7 (1)
- Raymond Jones – Fairlight CMI (3), Roland Jupiter-8 (3), Yamaha DX7 (3)
- Gary Chang – synthesizer programming (3, 8)
- Derek Nakamoto – synthesizer programming (4, 6), special effects (4, 6), Fairlight programming (6)
- Don Freeman – Roland Juno-60 (4), Yamaha DX7 (4, 6, 8), drum machine programming (4, 6, 8, 9), Fairlight CMI (6), acoustic piano (8, 9), Roland Jupiter-8 (8), PPG Wave 2.2 (8), Rhodes piano (9)
- David Wolinski – Rhodes piano (5), Minimoog (5), Roland Jupiter-8 (5), Yamaha DX7 (5), drum machine programming (5)
- John Barnes – Fairlight CMI (9)
- Michael Sembello – guitars (1)
- Paul Jackson Jr. – guitars (2–4, 6–9)
- Charles Fearing – guitars (5)
- Louis Johnson – bass (1, 8, 9)
- Freddie Washington – bass (2, 5–7)
- Abraham Laboriel – bass (9)
- Steve Ferrone – drums (1–3, 7, 8), hi-hat (9)
- Paulinho da Costa – percussion (2–4, 8, 9), cowbell (6), tambourine (6)
- Syreeta Wright – backing vocals (1)
- Portia Griffin – backing vocals (2, 7)
- Lynn Davis – backing vocals (4, 6)
- Tremaine Hawkins – backing vocals (5)

Strings (Tracks 2 &7)

- George Del Barrio – arrangements and conductor
- Bill Hughes – contractor
- Ronald Cooper, Ray Kelley, Earl Madison and Fred Seykora – cello
- Catherine Gotthoffer – harp
- Rollice Dale, Pam Goldsmith, Allan Harshman and Dave Schwartz – viola
- Arnold Belnick, Assa Drori, Henry Ferber, Ron Folsom, Dave Frisina, Jimmy Getzoff, Reg Hill, Karen Jones, Joy Lyle, Irma Neumann, Stan Plummer and Sid Sharp – violin

Choir of Life on "Live for Today"

- Pat Benatar, Lynn Davis, Tremaine Hawkins, Howard Hewett, James Ingram, Joyce Kennedy, Debra Laws, Kenny Loggins and Jeffrey Osborne

Production and Technical

- George Duke – producer
- Tommy Vicari – recording, remixing
- Erik Zobler – additional engineer
- Ray Blair – assistant engineer
- Frank Dookun – assistant engineer
- Bino Espinoza – assistant engineer
- Mark Ettel – assistant engineer
- Steve Evans – assistant engineer
- Mitch Gibson – assistant engineer
- Danny Kopelson – assistant engineer
- Dave Luke – assistant engineer
- Sharon Rice – assistant engineer
- Nick Spigel – assistant engineer
- Brent Averill – technician
- Brian Gardner – mastering at Bernie Grundman Mastering (Hollywood, California)
- Constance DeGuzman – production assistant
- Chuck Beeson – art direction, design
- John Heiden – design
- Matthew Rolston – photography
- Cecille Parker – stylist
- Jack Nelson & Associates – management

== Charts ==
=== Weekly charts ===
Chart (1984)	Peak position
UK Albums (Official Charts)	59
US Billboard 200	39
US Top R&B/Hip-Hop Albums (Billboard)	7

=== Year-end charts ===
Chart (1985)	Position
US Billboard 200	78
US Top R&B/Hip-Hop Albums (Billboard)	36

=== Singles ===
Year	Single	Chart positions	
Year	Single	US	US R&B
1984	"Don't Stop"	44	6
1984	"The Borderlines"	38	7
1985	"Let Me Know"	—	44

== Certifications ==
Region	Certification	Certified units/sales
United States (RIAA)	Gold	500,000^{^}
^{^} Shipments figures based on certification alone.

== In popular culture ==
Eden Capwell and Cruz Castillo danced to "The Borderlines" in a 1985 Santa Barbara episode where Osborne made a guest appearance as himself.
