= She's on the Left =

Single by Jeffrey Osborne

from the album One Love – One Dream
- B-side: "Stay with Me Tonight"
- Released: 1988
- Genre: R&B
- Length: 5:05
- Label: A&M
- Songwriter(s): Jeffrey Osborne, Tony Haynes, Robert Brookins, Clinton Spud Blanson
- Producer(s): Jeffrey Osborne

Jeffrey Osborne singles chronology
"Love Power" (1987)	"She's on the Left" (1988)	"Can't Go Back On a Promise" (1988)

"She's on the Left" is a 1988 single by Jeffrey Osborne. The single was one of the most successful of Osborne's solo career, reaching the number-one spot on the Black Singles chart and becoming his only number one. "She's on the Left" was his last release to make the Hot 100 peaking at number forty-eight. The single also became one of Osborne's most successful on the dance chart peaking at number six.
