= Only Human (Jeffrey Osborne album) =

Studio album by Jeffrey Osborne
- Released: November 20, 1990
- Genres: Funk; soul
- Length: 51:11
- Label: Arista
- Producers: Robert Brookins; Darryl Duncan; Barry J. Eastmond; Jeffrey Osborne; Shep Pettibone; Kendo Scott

Jeffrey Osborne chronology
One Love – One Dream (1988)	Only Human (1990)	Something Warm for Christmas (1997)

Only Human is the sixth studio album by American singer Jeffrey Osborne. It was released by Arista Records on November 20, 1990. His debut with the label, it reached number 9 on the US Top R&B Albums chart.

== Critical reception ==
Professional ratings
Review scores
Source	Rating
AllMusic	3/5 stars
Entertainment Weekly	A−
Q	2/5 stars

AllMusic editor Ed Hogan found that "while it could be argued that Osborne's A&M albums were generally "too pop," he seems absolutely regenerated on Only Human, digging his vocal chops into material that accommodates his extensive range. It's a head-scratcher as to why this is his only Arista release; it would have been very interesting to hear Osborne continue in this mode." Entertainment Weekly wrote that "Osborne’s voice is so silky and warm that he can anchor a varied collection of songs – ranging from the up-tempo [...] to the more personal, blustery [...] For any other singer, such an eclectic mix of musical styles like in Only Human, might seem like a desperate, unfocused grab for pop-chart success. But for Osborne it’s merely a reflection of a 20-year-long career that has dominated both black and pop radio [...] For all his forays into many musical genres, Osborne seems most at home, as he always has, in the ballads, where the drum machines don’t crowd his voice." Ian Cranna in Q Magazine remarked that "the chief pleasure here is in Osborne's confident, accomplished singing".

== Track listing ==
No.	Title	Writer(s)	Producer(s)	Length
1.	"If My Brother's in Trouble"	William Clift; David Barratt	Shep Pettibone	4:33
2.	"Only Human"	Barry J. Eastmond; Jeffrey Osborne	Eastmond	4:53
3.	"Good Things Come to Those Who Wait"	Glenn "Daddy-O" Bolton	Daddy-O; Kendo Scott	5:06
4.	"The Morning After I Made Love to You"	Eastmond; Osborne	Eastmond	4:27
5.	"Lay Your Head"	Eastmond; Osborne	Eastmond	4:59
6.	"Baby Wait a Minute"	Darryl Duncan; Osborne	Osborne, Duncan	4:13
7.	"Sending You a Love Song"	Eastmond; Osborne	Eastmond	4:49
8.	"Feel Like Making Love"	Eugene McDaniels	Osborne, Robert Brookins	4:35
9.	"Back in Your Arms"	Eastmond; Osborne	Eastmond	4:13
10.	"Nitetime"	Eastmond; Osborne	Eastmond	4:42
11.	"Getting Better All the Time"	Sam Dees	Eastmond	4:44

2012 expanded edition
No.	Title	Writer(s)	Producer(s)	Length
12.	"If My Brother's in Trouble" (Extended Hip Hop Mix)	Clift; Barratt	Pettibone	5:10
13.	"If My Brother's in Trouble" (Dub Mix)	Clift; Barratt	Pettibone	5:34
14.	"If My Brother's in Trouble" (Club Mix)	Clift; Barratt	Pettibone	7:23
15.	"Only Human" (7" Single Version)	Eastmond; Osborne	Eastmond	4:33
16.	"Never"	Osborne; Brookins	Osborne; Brookins	4:39

== Personnel ==
- Jeffrey Osborne – lead vocals, backing vocals (1, 2, 4, 5, 7, 9–11), arrangements (6, 8)
- Terry Burrus – keyboards (1)
- Alan Friedman – programming (1)
- Barry Eastmond – keyboards (2, 4, 5, 7, 9–11), drum programming (2, 5, 7, 9, 10), arrangements (2, 4, 5, 7, 9–11), synth solo (7), string arrangements and conductor (9, 11)
- Eric Rehl – synthesizers (2, 4, 7, 9–11), synthesizer programming (2, 4, 5, 7, 9–11)
- Ron Skies – additional synthesizer programming (2)
- Kendo Scott – keyboards (3)
- Darryl Duncan – all instruments (6), arrangements (6)
- Robert Brookins – all keyboards (8), all programming (8), arrangements (8)
- Mike Campbell – guitars (2, 5)
- Georg Wadenius – guitars (4)
- Nick Moroch – guitars (11)
- Anthony Jackson – bass (4, 11)
- Sam Sims – bass (9)
- Buddy Williams – drums (4)
- Terry Silverlight – drums (11)
- Vincent Henry – alto sax solo (4)
- Grover Washington Jr. – alto sax solo (5)
- Al Boson – vocal arrangements (3)
- Edith Wint – string contractor (9, 11)
- Richard Hendrickson – concertmaster (9, 11)
- Kathryn Russell – backing vocals (1)
- Dian Sorel – backing vocals (1)
- Lillias White – backing vocals (1)
- B.J. Nelson – backing vocals (2, 9)
- Karen Anderson – backing vocals (3)
- Cydné Monet – backing vocals (3)
- Tawatha Agee – backing vocals (4)
- Dennis Collins – backing vocals (4)
- Yolanda Lee – backing vocals (4, 7, 10)
- Nikki Richards – backing vocals (4)
- Alex Brown – backing vocals (6, 8)
- Joey Diggs – backing vocals (6)
- Portia Griffin – backing vocals (6)
- BRIGHT EYES – rap (6)
- Lynne Fiddmont – backing vocals (8)
- Marlena Jeter – backing vocals (8)
- Keith John – backing vocals (8)

== Production ==
- P. Dennis Mitchell – recording engineer (1)
- Earl Cohen – recording and mixing (2, 4, 5, 7, 9–11)
- Khaliq-O-Vision (Khaliq Glover) – recording (6, 8), mixing (6)
- Keith Cohen – mixing (8)
- Carl Beatty – string recording (9, 11)
- Curt Frasca – assistant engineer (1)
- Garvey Clark Jr. – recording and mix assistant (2, 4, 5, 7, 9–11)
- Mike Harlow – recording and mix assistant (2, 4, 5, 7, 9–11)
- Dave Lebowitz – recording and mix assistant (2, 4, 5, 7, 9–11)
- Tracy Chisholm – assistant engineer (6)
- Kimm James – assistant engineer (8)
- Carolyn Quan – art direction, design
- Adrian Buckmaster – photography
- Cecille Parker – wardrobe stylist
- Rudy Calvo – grooming, make-up
- Jack Nelson – management

Studios

- Recorded at Axis Studios, East Bay Studios, Soundtrack Studios and Greene Street Recording (New York, NY); Studiodad Digital (Brooklyn, NY); Wings West Recording (Northridge, CA).
- Strings recorded at Right Track Recording (New York, NY).
- Mixed at The Sandbox Studios (Easton, CT); Soundcastle and Larrabee Sound Studios (Hollywood, CA).

== Charts ==
=== Weekly charts ===
Chart (1990)	Peak position
US Billboard 200	95
US Top R&B/Hip-Hop Albums (Billboard)	9

=== Year-end charts ===
Chart (1991)	Position
US Top R&B/Hip-Hop Albums (Billboard)	21
