= I Really Don't Need No Light =

1982 single by Jeffrey Osborne

Single by Jeffrey Osborne

from the album Jeffrey Osborne
- B-side: "One Million Kisses"
- Released: 1982
- Recorded: 1982
- Genre: R&B; post-disco
- Length: 3:40 (single); 4:27 (extended)
- Label: A&M
- Songwriter(s): Jeffrey Osborne; Hawk Wolinski
- Producer(s): George Duke

Jeffrey Osborne singles chronology
"I Really Don't Need No Light" (1982)	"On the Wings of Love" (1982)

"I Really Don't Need No Light" is a song by Jeffrey Osborne, released in 1982 as the debut single from his self-titled album.

The song peaked at number 39 on the Billboard Hot 100 and reached the top five on the Hot Soul Singles chart, peaking at No. 3. It was Osborne's first entry on both charts.

== Chart performance ==
Chart (1982)	Peak position
US Billboard Hot 100	39
US Billboard Hot Soul Singles	3
