= One Love – One Dream =

Studio album by Jeffrey Osborne
- Released: July 15, 1988
- Genres: Funk; soul
- Length: 50:47
- Label: A&M
- Producers: Robert Brookins; Andy Goldmark; Jeffrey Osborne; Bruce Roberts; Ross Vannelli; Freddie Washington; David "Hawk" Wolinski

Jeffrey Osborne chronology
Emotional (1986)	One Love – One Dream (1988)	Only Human (1990)

Professional ratings
Review scores
Source	Rating
AllMusic	2/5 stars
The Encyclopedia of Popular Music	2/5 stars
Los Angeles Times	2/4 stars
The Rolling Stone Album Guide	2/5 stars

One Love – One Dream is the fifth studio album by American singer Jeffrey Osborne. It was released by A&M Records on July 15, 1988. The album reached number 12 on the US Billboard Top R&B/Hip-Hop Albums chart.

== Critical reception ==
The Los Angeles Times deemed the album "pop-oriented material that's better than the featherweight fare that, say, Rick Astley records, but that still underutilizes Osborne's abilities." The Christian Science Monitor thought that "as in the past, the ballads here are the strongest material, especially 'Family' and 'My Heart Can Wait Forever'." People called the album "disappointing," writing that it's "rife with paltry pop like the title track ... failed funk like 'She's on the Left', and frilly would-be show tunes like 'True Believers'."

== Track listing ==
No.	Title	Writer(s)	Producer(s)	Length
1.	"One Love – One Dream"	David "Hawk" Wolinski; Jeffrey Osborne	Wolinski	4:56
2.	"All Because of You"	Osborne; Robert Brookins	Osborne; Brookins	4:36
3.	"She's on the Left"	Clinton "Spud" Blanson; Osborne; Brookins; Tony Haynes	Osborne; Brookins	4:59
4.	"Can't Go Back on a Promise"	Edward Grenga; Osborne; Ross Vannelli	Osborne; Vannelli	4:37
5.	"True Believers"	Bruce Roberts; John Bettis	Osborne; Roberts	4:11
6.	"La Cuenta, Por Favor"	Osborne	Osborne	4:47
7.	"The Family"	Andy Goldmark; Bruce Roberts	Osborne; Goldmark; Roberts	4:22
8.	"My Heart Can Wait Forever"	Osborne; Vannelli	Osborne; Vannelli	3:30
9.	"(You Can't Get) Love from a Stone"	Osborne	Osborne	5:28
10.	"Cindy"	Freddie Washington; Osborne	Osborne; Washington	4:25
11.	"Social Climbers"	Andy Goldmark; Franne Golde	Goldmark	4:43

Notes

- "Social Climbers" appears on the CD version of One Love – One Dream only.

== Personnel ==
Performers and musicians

- Jeffrey Osborne – lead vocals, backing vocals, keyboards (6), drum programming (10)
- David "Hawk" Wolinski – keyboards (1), LinnDrum (1)
- Robert Brookins – keyboards (2, 3, 9), synth bass (2, 9), drum machine programming (2), LinnDrum programming (3)
- Ed Grenga – keyboards (4), synthesizer programming (4)
- Bobby Lyle – keyboards (5, 7, 8, 10)
- Philip Woo – keyboards (5, 10)
- Khaliq Glover – synthesizer programming (6, 10)
- Andy Goldmark – keyboards (7, 11), programming (7, 11)
- Bruce Roberts – keyboards (7, 11), programming (7, 11)
- Randy Kerber – synth strings (7)
- Franne Golde – keyboards (11), programming (11), backing vocals (11)
- Paul Jackson Jr. – guitars (1, 5–7, 10, 11)
- Maitland Ward – guitars (4)
- Michael Landau – guitars (6, 8)
- Freddie Washington – bass (4, 7, 8, 10)
- Abraham Laboriel – bass (5, 6)
- Freddy Lawson – bass (9)
- Ricky Lawson – drums (4, 6, 8–10)
- John Robinson – drums (5)
- Paulinho da Costa – percussion (4–7, 9)
- Donny Osborne – bongos (9)
- Gerald Albright – saxophone (2)
- Dan Higgins – saxophones (6, 9)
- Kirk Whalum – tenor saxophone (6, 9)
- Bill Reichenbach Jr. – trombone (6, 9)
- Gary Grant – trumpet (6, 9)
- Jerry Hey – trumpet (6, 9)
- Lynn Davis – backing vocals (1–3, 6, 7, 9–11)
- Joey Diggs – backing vocals (1–4, 6–11)
- Portia Griffin – backing vocals (1–5, 8, 9, 11)
- Natalie Jackson – backing vocals (1, 2)
- Alex Brown – backing vocals (3, 6, 7, 10, 11)
- Johnny Gill – backing vocals (4, 8, 9)
- Marva Barnes – backing vocals (4–11)
- Marcy Levy – backing vocals (5)
- Keith John – backing vocals (6–8)

Music arrangements

- Jeffrey Osborne – arrangements (1, 2, 4, 6–10), horn arrangements (6, 9)
- Hawk Wolinski – arrangements (1)
- Robert Brookins – arrangements (3)
- Ed Grenga – arrangements (4)
- Ross Vannelli – arrangements (4, 8)
- Jerry Hey – horn arrangements (9)
- Freddie Washington – arrangements (10)

Strings (Tracks 2, 5, 8 & 10)

- George Del Barrio – arrangements and conductor (2, 8)
- Jeremy Lubbock – arrangements and conductor (5, 10)
- Ronald Cooper, Larry Corbett, Ernie Ehrhardt, Suzie Katayama, Ron Leonard and David Speltz – cello
- Marylin Baker, Kenneth Burward-Hoy, Alan DeVeritch and Pamela Goldsmith – viola
- Ron Clark, Isabelle Daskoff, Ronald Folsom, Joseph Goodman, Bill Hybel, William Hymanson, Peter Kent, Brian Leonard, Gordon Marron, Stanley Plummer, Debra Price, Jay Rosen, Marshall Sosson and Shari Zippert – violin

Production and technical

- Jeffrey Osborne – producer
- David Wolinski – producer (1)
- Robert Brookins – producer (2, 3)
- Ross Vannelli – producer (4, 8)
- Bruce Roberts – producer (5, 7, 11)
- Andy Goldmark – producer (7, 11)
- Freddie Washington – producer (10)
- Khaliq Glover – recording
- Tommy Vicari – recording, mixing
- Taavi Mote – mixing
- Bryant Arnett – assistant engineer
- Brian Gardner – mastering at Bernie Grundman Mastering (Hollywood, California)
- Donny Osborne – production assistant
- Sherri Yvette Osborne – production coordinator
- Chuck Beeson – art direction
- Melanie Nielsen – design
- Victoria Pearson – photography
- Jack Nelson – management

== Charts ==
=== Weekly charts ===
Chart (1988)	Peak position
US Billboard 200	86
US Top R&B/Hip-Hop Albums (Billboard)	12

=== Year-end charts ===
Chart (1988)	Position
US Top R&B/Hip-Hop Albums (Billboard)	84
