= Black Radio Won't Play This Record =

Studio album by Mother's Finest
- Released: 1992
- Genres: Heavy metal; hard rock; soul; alternative metal
- Label: Scotti Brothers
- Producer: Thom Panunzio

Mother's Finest chronology
Subluxation (1990)	Black Radio Won't Play This Record (1992)	Meta-Funk'n Physical (2003)

Black Radio Won't Play This Record is an album by the American band Mother's Finest, released in 1992. The title of the album comes from a comment made by a Scotti Brothers executive. The band supported the album with a North American tour. The first single was "Generator".

== Production ==
Displeased with their previous studio album, the band hired new management and recorded demos. Three original members of Mother's Finest played on the album: Joyce Kennedy, Glenn Murdock, and Jerry Seay. It was produced by Thom Panunzio. "Power" is a tribute to female toughness.

== Critical reception ==
Professional ratings
Review scores
Source	Rating
AllMusic	3/5 stars
The Encyclopedia of Popular Music	3/5 stars
The Indianapolis Star	2.5/4 stars
MusicHound R&B: The Essential Album Guide	3/5 stars
Rock Hard	9.5/10

The Washington Post wrote that "lead singer Joyce Kennedy wastes no time bemoaning lack of black fan support for black rockers, singing in the first song, 'Negro': 'Like a rebel without a cause/ I play my music to no applause'." Spin called the album "loud, irreverent, and oozing integrity," writing that it "dishes out a Chaka-Khan-meets-alternametal onslaught." The Indianapolis Star deemed it "unadulterated hard rock," declaring that the band "manages to rage pretty effectively against racial and sexual stereotypes with an infectious metallic beat." The Kingston Whig-Standard said that "the guitars tend to be grungy and delivered at a high speed but [the band] don't believe in cliches either."

AllMusic wrote: "Taking off the gloves (both musically and lyrically) and throwing urban contemporary considerations to the wind, MF excels by doing what it does best: scorching heavy metal and hard rock with a touch of Ike & Tina Turner-ish soul." Washington City Paper declared that "Kennedy’s voice is bred for the band’s ability to go from downtempo soul all the way up to power metal sprinkled with funk influences." Miami New Times called Black Radio Won't Play This Record "one of the best rock albums of the Nineties."

== Track listing ==
No.	Title	Writer(s)	Length
1.	"Like a Negro"	Dion Murdock , Seay, G. Murdock	5:05
2.	"Power"	Kennedy, John Hayes	3:59
3.	"Generator"	Seay	4:34
4.	"Cry Baby"	Kennedy, Hayes	5:25
5.	"Shirt"	Kennedy, Hayes, Dion Murdock	3:00
6.	"The Wall"	Dion Murdock , G. Murdock, Hayes	5:19
7.	"Attitude"	Murdock, Kennedy, Dion Murdock	4:19
8.	"Crack Babies"	Seay, Murdock, Sam McCovey	5:11
9.	"Head Bangin' and Booty Shakin'"	Dion Murdock	2:58
10.	"Stop"	Seay, Cris Kennedy	3:42
11.	"Move (Get Outta My Way)"	Seay, Kennedy, Dee Dee Hakim	4:27
12.	"L.P.F."	Kennedy, Hayes	3:49
