= Thief in the Night (album) =

1985 studio album by George Duke

Studio album by George Duke
- Released: 1985
- Studio: Le Gonks West (West Hollywood, California); Conway Studios (Hollywood, California); Lion Share Studios (Los Angeles, California)
- Genre: Jazz-funk; R&B
- Length: 38:10
- Label: Elektra
- Producer: George Duke

George Duke chronology
Rendezvous (1984)	Thief in the Night (1985)	George Duke (1986)

Singles from Thief in the Night
- 1. "Thief in the Night" Released: 1985; 2. "I Surrender" Released: 1985; 3. "Love Mission" Released: 1985

Professional ratings
Review scores
Source	Rating
AllMusic	2/5 stars
People	(favourable)

Thief in the Night is the eighteenth studio album by American keyboardist and record producer George Duke. It was released in 1985 through Elektra Records, making it his first release on the label. The recording sessions for the album took place at Le Gonks West in West Hollywood, California. Duke played various keyboard instruments on the album, including Synclavier II, Memorymoog, Fender Rhodes, Sequential Circuits Prophet-5, clavinet, Yamaha P F15 and Minimoog. The album features contributions from Lynn Davis, Paul Jackson Jr, Paulinho da Costa, Robert Brookins and Deniece Williams among others.

The album peaked at number 183 on the Billboard 200 and number 52 on Top R&B/Hip-Hop Albums chart. Its lead single, a title track "Thief in the Night", reached number 37 on the Hot R&B/Hip-Hop Songs, number 21 on the Dance Club Songs, and number 89 in the UK Singles Chart. Its second single "I Surrender" and a promotional single "Love Mission" did not chart.

== Track listing ==
No.	Title	Writer(s)	Length
1.	"I Surrender"	David Batteau; James Ingram; Dan Freeman	3:32
2.	"Thief in the Night"	George Duke	4:47
3.	"Remembering the Sixties"	George Duke; Stevie Wonder	4:34
4.	"We're Supposed to Have Fun"	Robert Brookins; Tony Haynes	4:25
5.	"Ride"	George Duke	3:54
6.	"Love Mission"	Brian Potter; Len Ron Hanks	4:24
7.	"Jam"	George Duke	5:11
8.	"Why"	George Duke	4:12
9.	"La La"	George Duke; Paulinho da Costa	3:37
Total length:			38:10

== Personnel ==
Musicians

- George Duke – acoustic piano (1, 3, 4), Rhodes electric piano (1, 3, 4), Synclavier II (1–3, 6–8), organ (2), Memorymoog bass (2, 5), LinnDrum (2, 3, 5, 7, 9), marimba (2), trash cans (2), piccolo flute (2), squeak effects (2), melodica (3, 5), Minimoog bass (3, 6), Castle Bar clavinet solo (4–6, 8), Memorymoog (4, 7), Prophet-5 horns (4, 5, 9), horns (5), strings (5, 9) motorcycle effects (5), bass (6), drum tracks (6), Yamaha PF15 (9)
- Paul Jackson Jr. – guitars (1–6, 8–9)
- Charles Fearing – guitars (4)
- Chuck Gentry – guitars (7)
- Louis Johnson – bass (1, 4)
- Steve Ferrone – drums (1, 4, 8)
- Ricky Lawson – tom-toms (3), cymbals (3), hi-hat (3)
- John Robinson – tom-tom overdubs (5)
- Paulinho da Costa – percussion (1, 2, 6, 7, 9)
- Mick Guzauski – special effects (2, 5, 7)

Vocalists

- George Duke – all vocals (1, 5, 7), lead vocals (2–4, 6, 9), backing vocals (2–4, 6, 8)
- Lynn Davis – backing vocals (2–4, 6, 9), handclaps (4)
- Lena Sunday – backing vocals (2, 3, 6)
- Robert Brookins – backing vocals (3, 4)
- Carl Carwell – backing vocals (3, 4, 6, 9)
- Alice Murrell – backing vocals (3)
- Petsey Powell – backing vocals (4), handclaps (4)
- Deniece Williams – backing vocals (6, 9)
- Shirley Jones – backing vocals (7)
- John Fiore – lead vocals (8), backing vocals (8)
- Paulinho da Costa – backing vocals (9)
- Howard Hewett – backing vocals (9)

Party sounds on "La La"

- Corine Duke
- George Duke
- Mitch Gibson
- Paul Jackson Jr.
- Alice Murrell

=== Production ===
- George Duke – producer
- Mick Guzauski – recording, mixing (2, 5, 7)
- Tommy Vicari – recording, mixing (1, 3, 4, 6, 8, 9)
- Erik Zobler – additional engineer
- Mitch Gibson – assistant recording engineer, basic tracking (5)
- Steve Schmidt – assistant mix engineer (1, 3, 4, 6, 8, 9)
- Rick Clifford – assistant mix engineer (2, 5, 7)
- Brent Averill – technician
- Brian Gardner – mastering at Bernie Grundman Mastering (Hollywood, California)
- Alice Murrell – production assistant
- Carol Friedman – art direction, sleeve photography
- JoDee Stringham – design
- Chris Callis – cover photography
- Jay Vigon – cover concept
- Richard Seireeni – cover concept
- Herb Cohen – management

== Chart history ==
Chart (1985)	Peak position
US Billboard 200	183
US Top R&B/Hip-Hop Albums (Billboard)	52
