= Forbidden Lover (album) =

Studio album by Nancy Wilson
- Released: April 1987
- Studio: various
- Genre: Vocal jazz
- Length: 40:34
- Label: Columbia
- Producer: Dr. George Butler

Nancy Wilson chronology
Keep You Satisfied (1985)	Forbidden Lover (1987)	Nancy Now (1988)

Professional ratings
Review scores
Source	Rating
AllMusic	3/5 stars

Forbidden Lover is a studio album by American jazz singer Nancy Wilson released by Columbia Records in 1987. The album reached No. 8 on the Billboard Traditional Jazz Albums chart.

== Background ==
Forbidden Lover was produced by Dr. George Butler. Artists such as Branford Marsalis, Robert Brookins and Paul Jackson Jr. appeared on the album.

== Critical reception ==
William Ruhlmann of Allmusic in a 3/5 stars review, remarked "Billed as the 50th album by this 50-year-old singer, Nancy Wilson's Forbidden Lover is an attempt to contemporize her sound, with arrangements that recall Luther Vandross and the Earth, Wind & Fire horn section...But Wilson the jazz-R&B song stylist gets lost on most of these recordings."

Robert K. Oermann of USA Today also ranked this album at No. 31 on his list of 1987's top 50 R&B albums.

== Accolades ==
Wilson earned a Grammy nomination in the category of Best R&B Vocal Performance, Female for her performance on the album.

== Track listing ==
Track no.	Title	Songwriter(s)	Length
1	"Forbidden Lover" featuring Carl Anderson	Benny Diggs, Joseph Joubert	04:17
2	"I Was Telling Him About You"	Mark "Moose" Charlap, Don George	03:18
3	"If You Only Knew"	Robert Brookins, Lena Sunday	04:24
4	"Deeper"		04:47
5	"Puttin' My Trust"	Roger Bruno, Glenn Samuels, Ellen Schwartz	03:40
6	"You Know"	Ted Brancato, Gene McDaniels	04:23
7	"Too Good to Be True" featuring Carl Anderson	Paul Anderson, Gene McDaniels	04:21
8	"I Never Held Your Heart"		03:53
9	"What Will It Take This Time"		03:32
10	"A Song for You"	Leon Russell	04:00

== Charts ==
Chart (1987)	Peak position
US Traditional Jazz Albums (Billboard)	8
