= Stay with Me Tonight (album) =

Studio album by Jeffrey Osborne
- Released: July 22, 1983
- Recorded: February – May 1983
- Studios: The Complex, Lion Share Studios, Westlake Studios and Record Plant (Los Angeles, California); Ocean Way Recording, Le Gonks West and Soundcastle (Hollywood, California)
- Genres: R&B, post-disco, soul
- Length: 45:17
- Label: A&M
- Producer: George Duke

Jeffrey Osborne chronology
Jeffrey Osborne (1982)	Stay with Me Tonight (1983)	Don't Stop (1984)

Stay with Me Tonight is the second studio album by American singer Jeffrey Osborne. It was released on July 22, 1983, on A&M Records. Osborne reteamed with frequent collaborator George Duke to work on the album which reached #25 on the US Billboard 200 and #3 on the R&B chart. The title track, "Stay with Me Tonight", was a #4 R&B hit in 1983, while three other singles, "Don't You Get So Mad", "We're Going All the Way", and "Plane Love", entered the top 20.

== Critical reception ==
Professional ratings
Review scores
Source	Rating
AllMusic	4/5 stars

AllMusic editor Jason Elias found that songs "like "Other Side of the Coin," "When Are You Comin' Back," and "Two Wrongs Don't Make a Right" can't help but come off as filler given the excellent songs surrounding them. The best songs here more than make up for any so-so tracks and this is more than recommended."

== Track listing ==
All tracks produced by George Duke.

1. "Don't You Get So Mad" (Don Freeman, Jeffrey Osborne, Michael Sembello) - 3:48
2. "We're Going All the Way" (Barry Mann, Cynthia Weil) - 4:15
3. "Stay with Me Tonight" (Raymond Jones) - 4:55
4. "Greatest Love Affair" (Jeffrey Osborne, Sam Dees) - 5:01
5. "Plane Love" (David "Hawk" Wolinski) - 4:00
6. "Other Side of the Coin" (Carlos Vega, Don Freeman, Jeffrey Osborne) - 3:38
7. "I'll Make Believe" (Geoffrey Leib, Jeffrey Osborne) - 5:04
8. "When Are You Comin' Back?" (Don Freeman, Jeffrey Osborne, Johnny McGhee) - 4:01
9. "Forever Mine" (George Duke, Jeffrey Osborne, Leon Ware) - 5:14
10. "Two Wrongs Don't Make a Right" (Geoffrey Leib, Jeffrey Osborne) - 4:39

== Personnel ==
Performers and musicians

- Jeffrey Osborne – lead vocals, backing vocals, rhythm arrangements, horn arrangements (1, 8), synthesizers (1), handclaps (3), electronic drums (9)
- George Duke – rhythm arrangements, horn arrangements (1, 8), E-mu Emulator (1), Prophet-5 (1, 2, 5, 9, 10), acoustic piano (2, 4, 7), electric piano (2, 7, 9), clavinet (6), Moog bass (9), electronic drums (9)
- Don Freeman – acoustic piano (1), electric piano (1), synthesizers (6, 8)
- Raymond Jones – electric piano (3), synthesizers (3)
- David "Hawk" Wolinski – synthesizers (5), electronic drums (5)
- Michael Sembello – guitar (1, 2, 4, 5), electric guitar (7)
- Paul Jackson Jr. – guitar (3, 6)
- Brian May – guitar solo (3, 10)
- Earl Klugh – acoustic guitar (7, 9)
- David Williams – rhythm guitar (10)
- Henry Davis – bass (2)
- Alphonso Johnson – bass (3)
- Abraham Laboriel – bass (4, 7)
- Nathan Watts – bass (6)
- Louis Johnson – bass (10)
- Steve Ferrone – drums (1, 2, 4, 6–8, 10), electronic drums (3)
- John Gilston – drum programming (3)
- Leon Ware – electronic drums (9)
- Paulinho da Costa – percussion (1, 3, 6, 8–10)
- Emil Richards – timpani (2)
- Larry Williams – tenor saxophone (1, 6), saxophone (8)
- Bill Reichenbach Jr. – trombone (1, 6)
- Gary Grant – trumpet (1, 6)
- Jerry Hey – trumpet (1, 6, 8), horn arrangements (2, 4–7, 9, 10)
- George Del Barrio – conductor (1, 4, 7), string arrangements (2)
- Lynn Davis – backing vocals (1, 3)
- Marcy Levy – backing vocals (2, 6, 10)
- Portia Griffin – backing vocals (5, 7)
- Josie James – backing vocals (9)
- Ronn David Jaxson – backing vocals (5)

Production and technical

- Producer – George Duke
- Production Assistance – Cheryl R. Brown
- Engineer and Remix – Tommy Vicari
- Additional Engineers – Peter Chaiken and Erik Zobler
- Assistant Engineers – Barbara Rooney (Tracks 1, 4, 7, 8 & 10); Matt Forger (Tracks 1, 6 & 10); Steve Schmidt (Tracks 2, 3 & 6); Nick Spigel (Tracks 5, 6 & 9).
- Recorded at The Complex, Lion Share Recording, Westlake Audio, Ocean Way Recording and Record Plant (Los Angeles, CA); Le Gonks West and Soundcastle (Hollywood, CA).
- Mastered by Brian Gardner at Allen Zentz Mastering (Hollywood, CA).
- Art Direction – Chuck Beeson and Lynn Robb
- Design – Lynn Robb
- Photography – Lisa Powers

== Charts ==
=== Weekly charts ===
Chart (1983–1984)	Peak position
UK Albums (Official Charts)	56
US Billboard 200	25
US Top R&B/Hip-Hop Albums (Billboard)	3

=== Year-end charts ===
Chart (1984)	Position
US Top R&B/Hip-Hop Albums (Billboard)	5

== Certifications ==
Region	Certification	Certified units/sales
United States (RIAA)	Gold	500,000^{^}
^{^} Shipments figures based on certification alone.
