= Mother's Finest (1976 album) =

Studio album by Mother's Finest
- Released: 1976
- Genre: Funk rock
- Length: 35:34
- Label: Epic Records
- Producer: Tom Werman

Mother's Finest chronology
Mother's Finest (1972)	Mother's Finest (1976)	Another Mother Further (1977)

Alternative cover
- Rock Candy reissue cover

Mother's Finest is the second studio album by American funk rock band Mother's Finest, released in 1976 by Epic Records. The album was produced by Tom Werman. It is the band's second self-titled album, after their debut 1972 album. The song "Rain" was released as a single and reached the lower reaches of the Billboard charts. The album was reissued by Rock Candy Records in 2008 with two additional live tracks.

== Background ==
The band's 1972 debut album had been released by RCA Records, which deemed the album a failure and dropped the band from the label. After several years building a following by playing live throughout the southeastern United States, Mother's Finest was spotted by producer Tom Werman while playing at a club in Atlanta, Georgia. Werman signed them to Epic Records and offered to produce their second album.

Drummer Sanford "Pepe" Daniels played on the album but left before its release; he was replaced by Barry "B.B. Queen" Borden who is pictured on the album cover though he did not play on the recording. The album was certified gold, and gained notice from rock bands who invited Mother's Finest to serve as an opening act. The album gained additional media attention for the lyrics to the song “Niggizz Can’t Sang Rock ‘n’ Roll," which generated controversy from both black and white audiences. Those lyrics were inspired by the band's frustration with major record labels being unable to comprehend their interracial lineup or their mix of funk and rock music, though the band also intended the song to generate shock value in the media.

== Critical reception ==
AllMusic, due to the presence of producer Tom Werman who was better known for producing hard rock bands, described the album as "Sly Stone being infected with a welcome case of [Ted] Nugent's 'Cat Scratch Fever'." Classic Rock magazine has described the album as containing guitar riffs that would not sound out of place on albums by Nugent or Montrose, mixed with funk and vocals that showcased "Joyce Kennedy’s voice burning with soul and sexuality."

== Track listing ==
No.	Title	Writer(s)	Length
1.	"Fire"	Mick Keck, Joyce Kennedy, Gary Moore, Glenn Murdock, Jerry Seay	4:09
2.	"Give You All the Love (Inside of Me)"	Moore, Murdock	7:59
3.	"Niggizz Can't Sang Rock & Roll"	Keck, Kennedy, Moore, Murdock, Seay	5:24
4.	"My Baby"	Moore, Murdock	4:45
5.	"Fly With Me (Feel the Love)"	Keck, Kennedy, Moore, Murdock, Seay	4:47
6.	"Dontcha Wanna Love Me"	Keck, Kennedy, Moore, Murdock, Seay	4:08
7.	"Rain"	Shelby Daniel, Keck, Kennedy, Moore, Murdock, Seay	4:22
Total length:			35:34

== Personnel ==
- Joyce Kennedy – lead vocals, percussion
- Glenn Murdock – lead vocals, percussion
- Gary Moore – guitar
- Jerry Seay – bass, backing vocals
- Mick Keck – keyboards
- Sanford Daniels – drums
