= Jeffrey Osborne (album) =

Studio album by Jeffrey Osborne
- Released: May 18, 1982
- Studios: Westlake (Los Angeles, California); George Massenburg (Los Angeles, California); Le Gonks West (Hollywood, California); A&M (Hollywood, California); Fantasy (Berkeley, California)
- Length: 39:40
- Label: A&M
- Producer: George Duke

Jeffrey Osborne chronology
Jeffrey Osborne (1982)	Stay with Me Tonight (1983)

Singles from Jeffrey Osborne
- 1. "I Really Don't Need No Light" Released: 1982; 2. "On the Wings of Love" Released: 1982; 3. "Eenie Meenie" Released: 1982

Jeffrey Osborne is the debut studio album by American singer Jeffrey Osborne. It was released by A&M Records on May 18, 1982. His solo debut after leaving his band L.T.D. for a solo career, Osborne worked with George Duke on the majority of the album, though legal issues had initially prevented him from signing his solo deal with A&M for a whole year.

== Critical reception ==
Professional ratings
Review scores
Source	Rating
AllMusic	4/5 stars

AllMusic editor Jason Elias found that "unlike countless other acts who [went solo, Osborne's] self-titled release proves that it was a great decision. Producer George Duke offered Osborne an up-to-the-minute sound with a collection of great studio players ranging from drummer Steve Ferrone to bassist Louis Johnson [...] This is an impressive solo debut from one of R&B and pop's best vocalists."

== Chart performance ==
The album reached number 49 on the US Billboard 200 along with three singles, "On the Wings of Love", "I Really Don't Need No Light" and "Eenie Meenie" peaking at numbers 29, 39 and 76 on the Billboard Hot 100, respectively. "On the Wings of Love" also reached number 23 on the Cash Box Top 100 as well as number 7 on the US Adult Contemporary chart, and number 11 in the United Kingdom.

== Track listing ==
All tracks produced by George Duke.

No.	Title	Writer(s)	Length
1.	"New Love"	Geoffrey Leib	4:10
2.	"Eenie Meenie"	Raymond Lee Pounds; Michael Sembello	4:23
3.	"I Really Don't Need No Light"	Jeffrey Osborne; David "Hawk" Wolinski	3:40
4.	"On the Wings of Love"	Osborne; Peter Schless	4:00
5.	"Ready for Your Love"	Osborne; Ron Kersey	3:59
6.	"Who You Talkin' to?"	Osborne; Tony Maiden	3:51
7.	"You Were Made to Love"	Osborne; Len Ron Hanks	3:11
8.	"Ain't Nothin' Missin'"	Osborne; Geoffrey Leib; Michael Dorian	4:08
9.	"Baby"	Osborne; Jamaal Franklin	4:18
10.	"Congratulations"	Osborne; Richard Kerr	2:56

== Personnel ==
Vocalists and musicians

- Jeffrey Osborne – lead vocals (1, 3, 6, 8, 9), backing vocals (1, 3, 6, 8, 9), congas (1), all vocals (2, 4, 5, 7, 10), vocoder (6)
- George Duke – acoustic piano (1, 4, 8, 10), Prophet-5 (2, 3, 7), acoustic piano solo (2), vocoder (6), orchestra bells (7)
- John Barnes – Rhodes piano (2), Wurlitzer piano (5), Fender Rhodes (7)
- Bobby Lyle – Fender Rhodes (3)
- Ron Kersey – Fender Rhodes (9)
- Michael Sembello – guitars (1–4, 10)
- Charles Fearing – guitar (3, 5)
- Tony Maiden – guitars (6), bass (6)
- David T. Walker – guitars (7, 9)
- Paul Jackson Jr. – guitars (8)
- Louis Johnson – bass (1–3, 5, 7, 8)
- Abraham Laboriel – bass (4, 10)
- Larry Graham – bass (6, 9)
- Steve Ferrone – drums
- Paulinho da Costa – cowbell (1), percussion (2, 3, 5, 6, 8)
- Ernie Watts – tenor sax solo (1)
- Larry Williams – tenor saxophone (1, 5, 6, 8), flute (10)
- Lew McCreary – trombone (1, 5, 6, 8)
- Gary Grant – trumpet (1, 5, 6, 8, 10), piccolo trumpet (10)
- Jerry Hey – trumpet (1, 5, 6, 8, 10), piccolo trumpet (10)
- Bobby Martin – French horn (2, 10)
- Paul Shure – concertmaster (2–4, 7, 9)
- Arif Mardin – orchestration (10)
- Lynn Davis – backing vocals (3, 8, 9)

Handclaps

- Jeffrey Osborne (5, 6, 8)
- George Duke (5)
- Sheila E. (5)
- Paulinho da Costa (6, 8)
- Tony Maiden (6, 8)

Music arrangements

- George Duke – rhythm arrangements (1, 4, 8, 10), horn arrangements (5, 8, 10)
- Jeffrey Osborne – all vocal arrangements, rhythm arrangements (1, 4, 5, 7–10), horn arrangements (5, 8)
- Jerry Hey – horn arrangements (1, 5, 6, 8)
- Michael Sembello – rhythm arrangements (2)
- George del Barrio|George Del Barrio]] – string arrangements (2–4, 7, 9)
- Ron Kersey – rhythm arrangements (5)
- David "Hawk" Wolinski – rhythm arrangements (3)
- Len Ron Hanks – rhythm arrangements (7)

Production and technical

- George Duke – producer
- Tommy Vicari – engineer, mixing, recording engineer (2, 4, 5, 7, 10)
- Erik Zobler – tracking engineer (1, 3, 6, 8, 9)
- Wally Buck – assistant engineer
- Matt Forger – assistant tracking engineer
- Nick Spigel – assistant instrumental overdub engineer
- Robert Spano – assistant horn engineer (1, 5, 6, 8, 10), assistant vocal engineer (2, 4, 10)
- Bernie Faccone – assistant string engineer (2–4, 7, 9)
- Bernie Grundman – mastering at A&M Studios
- Chuck Beeson – art direction
- Lynn Robb – art direction, design
- Bobby Holland – photography
- Wilkes Bashford – wardrobe
- Nathan Block – wardrobe
- Jim Robinson – wardrobe
- Tara Posey – make-up
- Jack Nelson & Associates – management

== Charts ==
=== Weekly charts ===
Chart (1982)	Peak position
US Billboard 200	49
US Top R&B/Hip-Hop Albums (Billboard)	3

=== Year-end charts ===
Chart (1982)	Position
US Top R&B/Hip-Hop Albums (Billboard)	38
