= In the Zone (Wayman Tisdale album) =

Studio album by Wayman Tisdale
- Released: 1996
- Genre: R&B, jazz
- Length: 1:02:23
- Label: Motown
- Producer: Wayman Tisdale (Exec.): Frankie Ross (Exec.); Bruce Walker (Exec.); Robert Brookins; Art Dixie; Jerry Harris; J.R. Swinga; David Cochrane; Bobby Gonzales

Wayman Tisdale chronology
Power Forward (1995)	In the Zone (1996)

Professional ratings
Review scores
Source	Rating
Allmusic	3/5 stars

In the Zone is the second studio album by Wayman Tisdale released in 1996 on Motown Records. The album reached No. 7 on the Billboard Contemporary Jazz Albums chart and No. 9 on the Billboard Jazz Albums chart.

== Track listing ==
No.	Title	Writer(s)	Length
1.	"In the Zone Interlude"	Derek Allen, George Duke, Wayman Tisdale	1:12
2.	"Watch Me Play"	Derek Allen, Robert Brookins, Wayman Tisdale	5:04
3.	"In the Zone"	Art Dixie, Wayman Tisdale	5:01
4.	"Summer Breeze"	Dash Crofts, Jim Seals	6:39
5.	"These Feelings"	Robert Brookins, J.R. Swinga, Wayman Tisdale	4:18
6.	"High School Interlude"	Derek Allen, George Duke, Wayman Tisdale	0:42
7.	"Day Road Trip"	Art Dixie, Wayman Tisdale	5:34
8.	"Don't Take Your Love Away"	Art Dixie, Wayman Tisdale	0:03
9.	"College Interlude"	Derek Allen, George Duke, Wayman Tisdale	0:51
10.	"Washington High"	Wayman Tisdale	4:20
11.	"Starship"	Michael Henderson	5:43
12.	"Early Morning Drive"	Derek Allen, Wayman Tisdale	5:38
13.	"Pro Interlude"	Derek Allen, George Duke, Wayman Tisdale	1:04
14.	"Thinking of You"	Mike Broening, Wayman Tisdale	6:35
15.	"No Me Without You"	Bobby Gonzales	5:09
16.	"Summer Breeze Remix"	Dash Crofts, Jim Seals	4:30
Total length:			1:02:23

== Personnel ==
- Wayman Tisdale – bass, vocals (3, 10, 14), arrangements (3, 7, 8, 10, 14), vocal arrangements (10, 14)
- Robert Brookins – keyboards (2, 12), drums (2), arrangements (2), lead vocals (11)
- Raymond McKinley – Rhodes electric piano (2)
- Jerry Harris Jr. – keyboards (3, 4, 7, 14), organ (3, 4, 14), drums (4), arrangements (4), additional keyboards (11)
- Art Dixie – arrangements (3, 8), keyboards (8, 10), organ (10)
- Alex Alessandroni – acoustic piano (4), strings (15)
- J.R. Swinga – keyboards (5), vocoder (5), sound programming (5), drum programming (5), vocals (5), arrangements (5)
- David Cochrane – instruments (11), vocals (11), arrangements (11)
- Bobby Gonzales – guitars (3, 7), instruments (15), arrangements (15)
- Thano Sahnas – acoustic guitar (8)
- Eric Brown – drums (3, 7, 14)
- Arthur Thompson – drums (8, 10), percussion (10)
- Joseph "Butch Whip" Jackson – drum programming (16)
- Eddie Mininfield – alto saxophone (3, 7, 14), tenor saxophone (3, 7), horn arrangements (3, 7)
- Brian King Nelson – saxophone (12)
- Derek "DOA" Allen – vocals (2, 4, 10), vocal arrangements (4), keyboards (12), drums (12), arrangements (12)
- Sue Ann Carwell – backing vocals (11)
- Lalah Hathaway – vocals (16)
- Big Bub – vocals (16)

=== Production ===
- Eric Talbert – A&R direction
- Frankie Ross – executive producer
- Bruce Walker – executive producer
- Wayman Tisdale – executive producer, producer (2-4, 7, 8, 10-12, 14, 16)
- Robert Brookins – producer (2), recording
- Art Dixie – producer (3, 8)
- Jerry Harris Jr. – additional producer (3, 7, 14), producer (4, 16)
- Derek "DOA" Allen – co-producer (4, 16), producer (12)
- J.R. Swinga – producer (5)
- David Cochrane – producer (11)
- Bobby Gonzales – producer (15)
- Otto D'Agnolo – recording, mixing
- Jean-Marie Horvat – recording, mixing
- Vernie Vern – recording
- Lee "Big Bub" Drakeford – remixing (16)
- Roger Seibel – mastering at SAE Mastering (Phoenix, Arizona)
- Crystal Chambers – production coordinator
- Carol Friedman – art direction, photography
- David Harley – design
- David Irvin – design
