= Wayman Tisdale =

American basketball player (1964–2009)

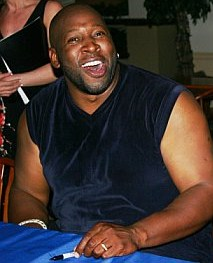
- Tisdale at a CD release party in 2006

Personal information
- Born: June 9, 1964 Fort Worth, Texas, U.S.
- Died: May 15, 2009 (aged 44) Tulsa, Oklahoma, U.S.
- Listed height: 6 ft 9 in (2.06 m)
- Listed weight: 260 lb (118 kg)

Career information
- High school: Booker T. Washington (Tulsa, Oklahoma)
- College: Oklahoma (1982–1985)
- NBA draft: 1985: 1st round, 2nd overall pick
- Drafted by: Indiana Pacers
- Playing career: 1985–1997
- Position: Power forward
- Number: 23

Career history
- 1985–1989: Indiana Pacers
- 1989–1994: Sacramento Kings
- 1994–1997: Phoenix Suns

Career highlights
- 3× Consensus first-team All-American (1983–1985); 3× Big Eight Player of the Year (1983–1985); 3× First-team All-Big Eight (1983–1985); No. 23 honored by Oklahoma Sooners; Mr. Basketball USA (1982); First-team Parade All-American (1982); McDonald's All-American (1982)

Career NBA statistics
- Points: 12,878 (15.3 ppg)
- Rebounds: 5,117 (6.1 rpg)
- Assists: 1,077 (1.3 apg)
- Stats at NBA.com
- Stats at Basketball Reference
- Collegiate Basketball Hall of Fame
Medals
Men's basketball
Representing the United States
Olympic Games
Gold medal – first place	1984 Los Angeles	Team competition
Pan American Games
Gold medal – first place	1983 Caracas	Team competition

Wayman Lawrence Tisdale (June 9, 1964 – May 15, 2009) was an American professional basketball player in the National Basketball Association (NBA) and a smooth jazz bass guitarist. A three-time All American at the University of Oklahoma, he was elected to the National Collegiate Basketball Hall of Fame in 2009, and was inducted into the Oklahoma Music Hall of Fame in 2011.

== Early life ==
Tisdale was born in Fort Worth, Texas. His father, Louis Tisdale, was a well-known pastor in Tulsa, Oklahoma, serving for 21 years as senior pastor of Friendship Church. After his father died in 1997, the former Osage Expressway in Tulsa was named L.L. Tisdale Parkway in his honor. Wayman's older brother Weldon served as the church's pastor 1997–2018.

Growing up, Tisdale was not interested in basketball. When older brothers Weldon and William played pickup games he usually quit before they finished, retreating to the family's sandbox. However, Tisdale began taking to the sport in the eighth grade when he first learned to dunk.

He met his future wife Regina in April 1981 at church. They were juniors at different Tulsa high schools, and she did not know he was one of the most heavily recruited basketball players in the country.

Tisdale called music his "first love." Throughout his youth, and continuing through his college basketball career, he played bass guitar at his father's church.

Music and church were so important to Tisdale that after recruiting him to the University of Oklahoma, Sooners head coach Billy Tubbs changed the team's practice schedule. He moved the team's Sunday practice from the morning to the evening to allow Tisdale to play at morning services in his father's church in Tulsa.

== Basketball career ==
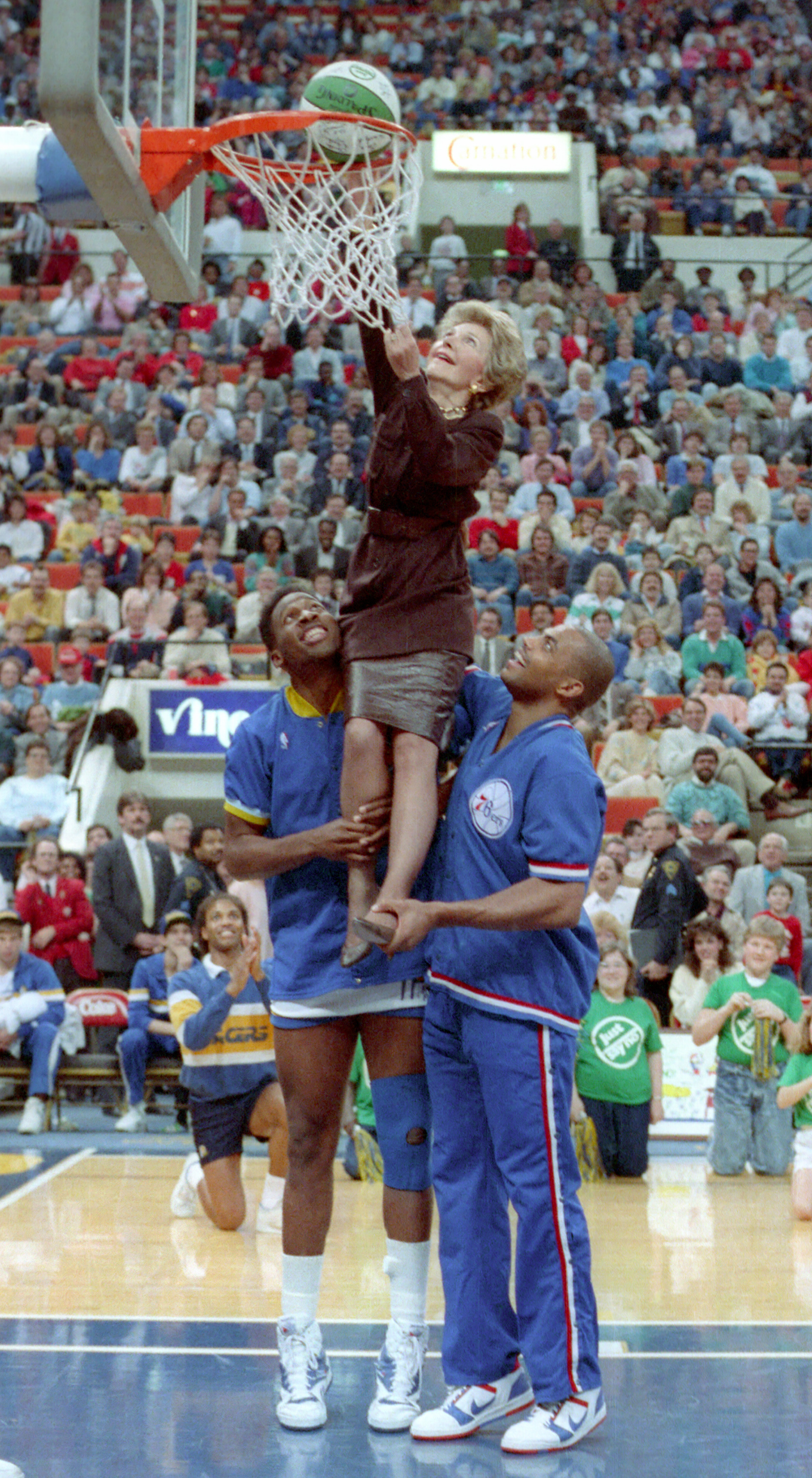
Tisdale and Charles Barkley lift Nancy Reagan to a basketball hoop at a 1988 game

Tisdale graduated from Booker T. Washington High School in Tulsa, Oklahoma, where he grew up. As a college player at the University of Oklahoma from 1982 to 1985, he was a three-time Big Eight Conference Player of the Year and the first player in collegiate history to be named a first-team All American by the Associated Press in his freshman, sophomore, and junior seasons. He still holds the record at Oklahoma for the most points scored by any player through his freshman and sophomore seasons. He won a gold medal as a member of the 1984 U.S. Olympic basketball team coached by Indiana University's Bobby Knight, the last gold medal-winning American basketball team with amateur players. The Indiana Pacers made Tisdale the second overall pick in the 1985 NBA draft.

As a power forward, Tisdale averaged over 15 points and six rebounds per game in a 12-season professional career with the Indiana Pacers, Sacramento Kings, and Phoenix Suns. His best season was in 1989–90 with the Kings, when he averaged 22.3 points and 7.5 rebounds a game. Tisdale retired in 1997 to focus on his musical career.

Tisdale's jersey number (23) was retired by the University of Oklahoma in 1997. When Blake Griffin was granted permission to wear it during his career at OU (2007–2009), he sought and received Tisdale's blessing before accepting it.

The outstanding freshman award in the NCAA is named the Wayman Tisdale Award.

== NBA career statistics ==
Legend
GP	Games played	GS	Games started	MPG	Minutes per game
FG%	Field goal percentage	3P%	3-point field goal percentage	FT%	Free throw percentage
RPG	Rebounds per game	APG	Assists per game	SPG	Steals per game
BPG	Blocks per game	PPG	Points per game	**Bold**	Career high

=== Regular season ===
Year	Team	GP	GS	MPG	FG%	3P%	FT%	RPG	APG	SPG	BPG	PPG
1985–86	Indiana	**81**	60	28.1	.515	.000	.646	7.2	1.0	.4	.5	14.7
1986–87	Indiana	**81**	15	26.7	.513	.000	.709	5.9	1.4	.6	.3	14.5
1987–88	Indiana	79	57	30.1	.512	.000	.783	6.2	1.3	.7	.4	16.1
1988–89	Indiana	48	5	27.6	.505	.000	.792	6.5	1.6	.7	.7	16.0
1988–89	Sacramento	31	30	35.7	.523	—	.744	**9.6**	1.7	.6	.6	19.8
1989–90	Sacramento	79	**79**	**37.2**	**.525**	.000	.783	7.5	1.4	.7	.7	**22.3**
1990–91	Sacramento	33	31	33.8	.483	.000	.800	7.7	**2.0**	.7	.8	20.0
1991–92	Sacramento	72	71	35.0	.500	.000	.763	6.5	1.5	**.8**	**1.1**	16.6
1992–93	Sacramento	76	75	30.0	.509	.000	.758	6.6	1.4	.7	.6	16.6
1993–94	Sacramento	79	77	32.4	.501	—	**.808**	7.1	1.8	.5	.7	16.7
1994–95	Phoenix	65	13	19.6	.484	—	.770	3.8	.7	.4	.4	10.0
1995–96	Phoenix	63	6	18.3	.495	—	.765	3.4	.9	.2	.6	10.7
1996–97	Phoenix	53	15	14.7	.426	—	.625	2.3	.4	.2	.4	6.5
Career		840	534	28.4	.505	.000	.760	6.1	1.3	.6	.6	15.3

=== Playoffs ===
Year	Team	GP	GS	MPG	FG%	3P%	FT%	RPG	APG	SPG	BPG	PPG
1987	Indiana	4	0	**27.0**	**.613**	—	.565	**4.0**	**2.3**	**.3**	.0	**12.8**
1995	Phoenix	**10**	0	17.0	.451	.000	**.643**	3.0	1.1	.0	**.4**	7.3
1996	Phoenix	4	0	16.8	.333	—	.500	1.0	.5	**.3**	.3	5.3
1997	Phoenix	4	**4**	9.0	.400	—	—	1.8	.0	.0	.0	3.0
Career		22	4	17.3	.456	.000	.590	2.6	1.0	.1	.2	7.1

== Music career ==
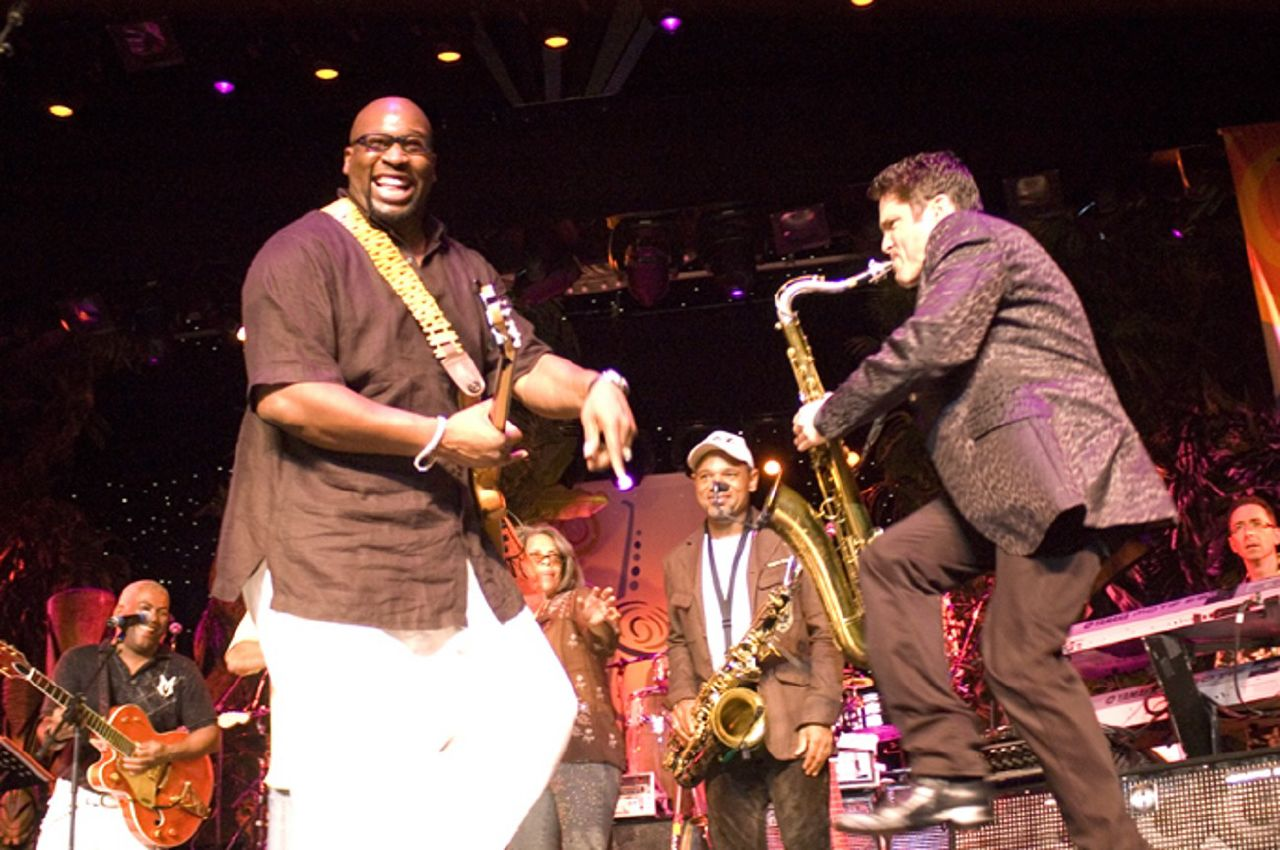
Wayman Tisdale and Dave Koz at the Dave Koz & Friends Smooth Jazz Cruise 2006.

Tisdale launched his music career with his debut album Power Forward in 1995 on the Motown Label. Primarily a bass player, he recorded eight albums, with the 2001 release Face to Face climbing to No. 1 on Billboard's contemporary jazz chart. He was awarded the Legacy Tribute Award by the Oklahoma Jazz Hall of Fame in 2002. In an ESPN internet chat, Tisdale said his musical influences included the funk bands of the 1970s. His most recent release (and his final album before his death), Rebound, was written and released after he was diagnosed with cancer.

== Cancer diagnosis ==
In March 2007, Tisdale underwent treatment for cancer in his knee (osteosarcoma), which was discovered after he fell down a flight of stairs at his home in Los Angeles on February 8, and broke his leg. In May, Tisdale announced on his website that he was recovering from a procedure to remove the cyst, and expected to recover 100%. He and Regina agreed not to tell their four children about his diagnosis until the fall of that year, when the entire family was together (their oldest daughter lives in Atlanta and their second-oldest was attending college at the time). However, the first round of chemotherapy was unsuccessful, leading to a second round. As Tisdale recalled later, "The doctor had never given anyone chemo that was my size. They just calculated how much chemo to give me and said, 'We hope it doesn't mess up your kidneys. If it does, sorry." He drew on some of the challenges he faced during his basketball career to battle the disease, specifically recalling, "I had some coaches that literally didn't want me to make it, and one in particular was Bobby Knight. At the time I frowned on that … I look at it today that had I not persevered through a lot of the stuff he put me through, I probably wouldn't be here today. I thank God for that dude because he pushed me."

In August 2008, Tisdale had part of his right leg amputated because of the bone cancer. On his web site, Tisdale said removing a portion of the leg would be the best way to ensure that the cancer would not return. In a video message at halftime of a September 28 Sooners' football game, Tisdale affirmed he was doing well and that he was at peace following the operation.

Shortly after the operation, he was fitted for a prosthesis. Scott Sabolich, the clinical director, said that in his 21-year career he had never created a prosthesis as large as the one he had to design for Tisdale. Sabolich noted that it typically takes a new amputee from three to six months to acclimate to a prosthesis, while it took Tisdale a month. He proved to be equally quick in learning to walk on his new limb; a physical therapist Tisdale worked with in Tulsa said that he was months ahead of a typical patient in that respect. Tisdale's experience led him to establish the Wayman Tisdale Foundation to raise funds to help amputees with the prosthetic process, which is not always covered by health insurance.

In April 2009, Tisdale accepted an award from the Greenwood Cultural Center in Tulsa, then set off on a 21-date national concert tour.

=== Death ===
Tisdale died on May 15, 2009, at St. John Medical Center in Tulsa, where his wife had taken him when he had trouble breathing. She later confirmed that he died after his esophagus ruptured following radiation treatments for his cancer. Tisdale's agent described his death as a "great shock" and noted that Tisdale had been planning to go into the recording studio the following week for a project with jazz guitarist Norman Brown.

On May 21, 2009, 4,000 mourners attended Tisdale's memorial service at the BOK Center in Tulsa. In June 2009, the University of Oklahoma-Tulsa announced that its new specialty health clinic in north Tulsa would be named in Tisdale's honor.

According to the liner notes, Toby Keith's 2009 album American Ride is "dedicated in memory of Wayman and Noel McFarland." The album includes the song "Cryin' for Me (Wayman's Song)," a tribute to Tisdale featuring Keith, Dave Koz, Marcus Miller, and Arthur Thompson. Keith had intended to play the song at Tisdale's funeral but performed Willie Nelson's "Angel Flying Too Close to the Ground" instead because he was not emotionally ready to play "Cryin' for Me", which opens with Tisdale's outgoing voicemail message.

According to a note in the album sleeve, the song "Bright" by guitarist Peter White (Good Day, 2009) was dedicated "to the memory of Wayman Tisdale, whose spirit never failed to brighten our lives." White said: "The guy was always so happy, so positive, always had a smile, always made you feel great. Even before his death, I'd always called this song 'Bright,' because it sounded uplifting and happy and funny. Then I realized that it would be the perfect song to dedicate to Wayman, because that was the way he came across to the world."

== Legacy ==
Tulsa has named an elementary school (Pre-K through 5th grade) as the Wayman Tisdale Fine Arts Academy.

== Discography ==
- Power Forward (Motown, 1995)
- In The Zone (Motown, 1996)
- Decisions (1998)
- Face to Face (2001)
- Presents 21 Days (2003)
- Hang Time (2004)
- Way Up! (2006)
- Rebound (2008)
- Fonk Record: Featuring Tiz & Fonkie Planetarians (2010)
- The Absolute Greatest Hits (2014)

== See also ==
- List of NCAA Division I men's basketball players with 60 or more points in a game
- List of NCAA Division I men's basketball players with 2000 points and 1000 rebounds
