= You Should Be Mine (The Woo Woo Song) =

Single by Jeffrey Osborne

from the album Emotional
- B-side: "Who Would Have Guessed"
- Released: July 14, 1986
- Recorded: 1986
- Genre: R&B, soul
- Length: 4:21
- Label: A&M
- Songwriters: Andy Goldmark, Bruce Roberts
- Producers: Richard Perry, Andy Goldmark (asso.), Bruce Roberts (asso.)

Jeffrey Osborne singles chronology
"Let Me Know" (1985)	"You Should Be Mine (The Woo Woo Song)" (1986)	"Soweto" (1986)

"You Should Be Mine (The Woo Woo Song)" is a 1986 song by Jeffrey Osborne from the album Emotional. It was his biggest pop hit when released as a single, reaching #13 on the Billboard Hot 100 pop chart. On other US charts, "You Should Be Mine" peaked at #2 on both the Hot Black Singles and Adult Contemporary charts.

== Background ==
"The Woo Woo Song" is the title in parentheses because Jeffrey's little daughter did not know the exact title, she identified the song saying "Daddy, sing 'The Woo Woo Song'!" Jeffrey thus affectionately nicknamed the track.

== Chart positions ==
Chart (1986)	Peak position
U.S. Billboard Hot 100	13
U.S. Billboard Adult Contemporary Chart.	2
U.S. Billboard Hot Black Singles	2

== Personnel ==
- Jeffrey Osborne – lead vocals, backing vocals
- Andy Goldmark – synthesizers, drum programming
- Bruce Roberts – synthesizers, drum programming
- Robbie Buchanan – additional synthesizers
- Jeff Lorber – additional synthesizers
- Dann Huff – guitars
- Paul Jackson Jr. – guitars
- John Robinson – drums
- Paulinho da Costa – percussion
- Alex Brown – backing vocals
- Bunny Hull – backing vocals
- Stephanie Spruill – backing vocals

== In popular culture ==
- The 17th episode of Cosby titled "Valentine's Day" features Jeffrey Osborne guest starring and performing the song.
- The song was heard on the daytime serial Santa Barbara.
- ESPN sportscaster John Buccigross has referenced the song with “and a woo woo woo!” during highlights of NBA superstar James Harden scoring baskets.
