= Power Forward (album) =

Studio album by Wayman Tisdale
- Released: 1995
- Studio: Chˆton Studios; Criteria Recording Studios; Double Trouble Studios, Miami, FL; Tisway Studios, Paradise Valley, AZ
- Genre: R&B, jazz
- Length: 58:54
- Label: Motown

Wayman Tisdale chronology
Power Forward (1995)	In The Zone (1996)

Professional ratings
Review scores
Source	Rating
Allmusic	2.5/5 stars

Power Forward is a studio album by Wayman Tisdale released in 1995 on Motown Records. The album reached No. 4 on the Billboard Jazz Albums chart.

== Tracklisting ==
No.	Title	Length
1.	"Circumstance"	4:26
2.	"Passion"	5:11
3.	"Jazz in You"	3:30
4.	"Gina Kay"	6:20
5.	"Gabrielle"	5:16
6.	"Danger Zone"	4:31
7.	"After the Game (Intro)"	0:14
8.	"After the Game"	5:11
9.	"Power Forward"	4:27
10.	"Back Home"	5:48
11.	"Inside Stuff"	4:31
12.	"You"	4:47
13.	"Amazing Grace"	4:42
