= Jeffrey Osborne =

American musician (born 1948)

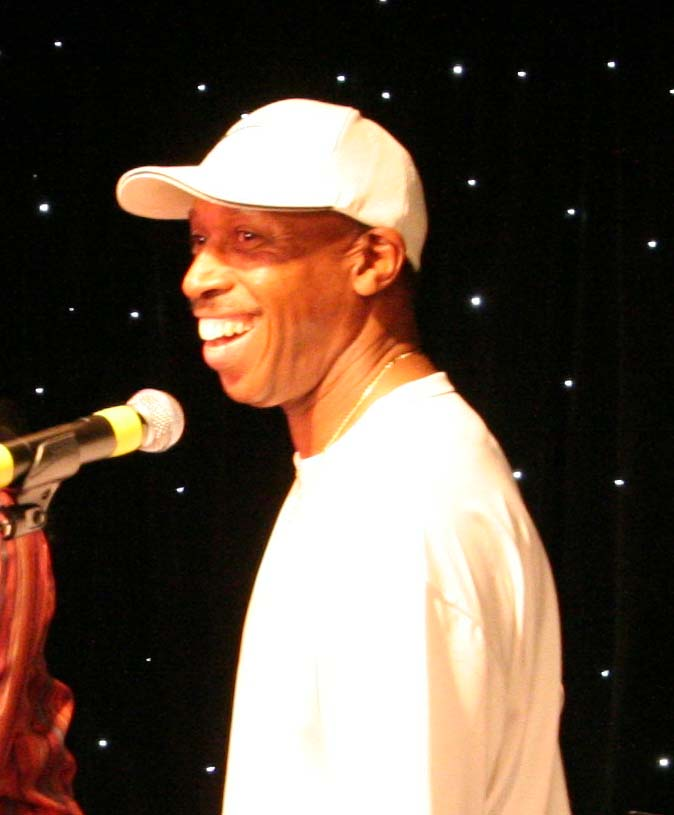
- Osborne in 2008

Background information
- Born: Jeffrey Linton Osborne; March 9, 1948 (age 78); Providence, Rhode Island, United States
- Genres: R&B; soul; quiet storm; adult contemporary; disco
- Occupations: Singer-songwriter; musician; drummer
- Instruments: Vocals; drums
- Years active: 1970–present
- Labels: A&M; Arista; Hip-O; Private Music; Koch
- Website: jeffreyosborne.com

Jeffrey Linton Osborne (born March 9, 1948) is an American singer-songwriter, musician and lyricist. He is the former drummer and lead singer of the American R&B/soul group L.T.D., with whom he began his musical career in 1970. In 2024, Osborne was inducted into the Rhythm and Blues Music Hall of Fame.

== Biography ==
=== Early life and family ===
Osborne was born in Providence, Rhode Island. Born the youngest of 12 children which consisted of six brothers and six sisters, Osborne's family was musically inclined. Some of Osborne's siblings went on to have music careers as well; his brother Billy Osborne was his band-mate in L.T.D. Osborne's father, Clarence "Legs" Osborne, was a popular trumpeter who played with Lionel Hampton, Count Basie and Duke Ellington. Osborne's father died in 1961 when Osborne was thirteen.

=== L.T.D. ===
Osborne began his music career in 1970 becoming a member of the American soul band "Love Men Ltd.", who would later become known as L.T.D. The band recorded hit singles such as "(Every Time I Turn Around) Back in Love Again" (1977), "Concentrate on You," "Love Ballad" (1976) and "Holding On (When Love Is Gone)" (1978). At first, Osborne served as only a drummer, sharing lead vocal duties with his brother Billy Osborne but, by 1976, he became the group's primary lead vocalist. Osborne and his brother both left the band in late 1980 to start solo careers. Osborne sang lead vocals on L.T.D.'s three No. 1 songs on the U.S. R&B Chart and for the band's three gold and platinum albums.

=== Solo career ===
In 1982, Osborne sang the opening song "I Just Want to Be Your Friend" for the comedy film The Toy. Osborne later released his self-titled debut album in 1982, which featured two hit singles, "On the Wings of Love" and "I Really Don't Need No Light" (1982), peaking at No. 29 and No. 39, respectively, on the pop chart. It was followed the next year by Stay with Me Tonight, his first solo gold album, which spawned four more hits, "Don't You Get So Mad" (No. 25), the title track (No. 30), "Plane Love" (No. 10 R&B, No. 6 dance), and "We're Going All the Way (No. 48). "Stay with Me Tonight" (May 1984, No. 18) and "On the Wings of Love" (August 1984, No. 11) would belatedly reach the UK Singles Chart.

In 1985, Osborne wrote the lyrics to the Whitney Houston hit "All at Once" (music by Michael Masser). He appeared on USA for Africa's fundraising single, "We Are the World" in 1985. Osborne sang the unreleased single "Everything Good Takes Time" which was part of a video tribute to Julius Erving ('Dr. J') in 1987. He would later appear on Celebrity Duets in 2006, performing "On the Wings of Love" with Alfonso Ribeiro. Osborne lent his vocals to the theme song of the soap opera, Loving, from 1992 to 1995 as well as the first-season theme song for the Kirstie Alley comedy Veronica's Closet.

Osborne had two more gold albums, Don't Stop and Emotional, the latter of which had his highest-charting solo pop hit, "You Should Be Mine", which peaked at No. 13 in 1986. The following year, Osborne had the highest-charting hit of his career duetting with Dionne Warwick on "Love Power", which reached No. 12 on the Billboard Hot 100 and also topped the Adult Contemporary singles chart. It was a turning point in his pop success, as his albums and singles began charting lower and lower. Osborne's 1988 single "She's on the Left" would be his final Hot 100 entry, as well as his only No. 1 R&B hit.

=== Later career ===
In the new millennium, he returned with a series of albums that, while far from the success he enjoyed in the 1980s, returned him to Adult R&B radio, scoring modest chart singles such as "Rest of Our Lives" (No. 75, 2003) and his cover of Barbara Mason's classic "Yes, I'm Ready" (No. 64, 2005).

In 2008, Osborne sang the national anthem before game 4 of the NBA Finals at Staples Center in Los Angeles, a feat which he repeated in 2009 before game 1 of the 2009 NBA Finals, and also again in 2010 before game 1 of the NBA Finals, all at Staples Center. He also performed the national anthem prior to game 3 of the 1988 World Series, a feat he repeated two years later at game 3 of the 1990 World Series, both at the Oakland Alameda County Coliseum in Oakland, California. He also regularly sang the national anthem before Hartford Whalers games. On March 1, 2010, Osborne appeared on The Bachelor: On the Wings of Love season finale, "After the Final Rose", singing his hit "On the Wings of Love" while Bachelor Jake Pavelka took to the dance floor with his newly announced fiancée, Vienna Girardi. In 2024, Osborne was selected for induction into the National Rhythm and Blues Hall of Fame

== Personal life ==
Osborne married Sheri Osborne in 1983, and together they have three daughters: Tiffany Nicole, Dawn, and Jeanine Osborne; and a son, Jeffrey Jr. His wife died in 2025 at the age of 69.

== Discography ==
=== Studio albums ===
Title	Album details	Peak positions			Certifications
Title	Album details	US	US R&B	UK	Certifications
Jeffrey Osborne	Released: May 18, 1982; Label: A&M Records	49	3	—	
Stay with Me Tonight	Released: July 22, 1983; Label: A&M Records	25	3	56	RIAA: Gold
Don't Stop	Released: September 21, 1984; Label: A&M Records	39	7	59	RIAA: Gold
Emotional	Released: May 27, 1986; Label: A&M Records	27	5	—	RIAA: Gold
One Love – One Dream	Released: July 15, 1988; Label: A&M Records	86	12	—	
Only Human	Released: November 20, 1990; Label: Arista Records	95	9	—	
Something Warm for Christmas	Released: November 4, 1997; Label: Modern Records	—	86	—	
That's for Sure	Released: February 8, 2000; Label: Private Music	191	50	—	
Music Is Life	Released: May 20, 2003; Label: Koch Records	—	50	—	
From the Soul	Released: October 4, 2005; Label: Koch Records	—	72	—	
A Time for Love	Released: January 29, 2013; Label: Saguaro Road Records	—	34	—	
Worth It All	Released: May 25, 2018; Label: Artistry Music	—	—	—	
"—" denotes releases that did not chart.

=== Charted singles ===
Year	Single	Chart positions					
Year	Single	US	US R&B	US AC	US AR&B	AUS	UK Pop
1982	"I Really Don't Need No Light"	39	3	—	—	—	—
1982	"On the Wings of Love"	29	13	7	—	36	11
1983	"Eenie Meenie"	76	—	18	—	—	—
1983	"Don't You Get So Mad"	25	3	29	—	—	54
1983	"Stay with Me Tonight"	30	4	—	—	—	18
1984	"Plane Love"	—	10	—	—	—	—
1984	"We're Going All the Way"	48	16	6	—	—	—
1984	"The Last Time I Made Love" (with Joyce Kennedy)	40	2	37	—	—	—
1984	"Don't Stop"	44	6	—	—	—	61
1984	"The Borderlines"	38	7	—	—	—	98
1985	"Let Me Know"	—	44	—	—	—	—
1986	"You Should Be Mine (The Woo Woo Song)"	13	2	2	—	—	—
1986	"Soweto"	—	18	—	—	—	44
1986	"Room with a View"	—	29	—	—	—	96
1986	"In Your Eyes"	—	82	15	—	—	—
1987	"Love Power" (with Dionne Warwick)	12	5	1	—	—	63
1988	"She's on the Left"	48	1	—	—	—	—
1988	"Can't Go Back on a Promise"	—	28	—	—	—	—
1989	"All Because of You"	—	48	—	—	—	—
1989	"Take Good Care of You and Me" (with Dionne Warwick)	—	46	25	—	—	93
1990	"Only Human"	—	3	—	—	—	—
1991	"If My Brother's in Trouble"	—	11	—	—	—	—
1991	"The Morning After I Made Love to You"	—	24	—	—	—	—
1994	"I'll Be Around" (Russ Freeman/Rippingtons featuring Jeffrey Osborne)	—	—	—	33	—	—
2000	"That's For Sure"	—	—	—	6	—	—
2003	"The Rest of Our Lives"	—	75	—	11	—	—
2003	"Caller ID"	—	—	—	30	—	—
2005	"Yes, I'm Ready"	—	64	—	14	—	—
2018	"Worth It All"	—	—	—	12	—	—
"—" denotes the single failed to chart

== Filmography ==
- The Young Messiah – Messiah XXI (2006) (DVD)

== Awards and honors ==
In 2019 Osbourne was recognized with the Wheeler community Spirit Award, given to a member of the Providence, RI community who advocates for those who have fewer opportunities. Recipients are recognized for their efforts in four key areas:

- Passion for equity and social justice, both locally and globally
- Appreciation for and promotion of the benefits of education
- Commitment to creating opportunities in the community for those who otherwise might not have a voice or an advocate
- Resilience in the face of challenge and adversity. We ask each recipient to attend the annual Wheeler School Community Potluck Dinner, where the award is presented. The Family Potluck dinner is a school-wide event, sponsored by the Upper School's diversity club Students Involved in Cultural Awareness (SICA), the Office of Unity & Diversity, and the Wheeler Parent's Association.

Osborne received the 2014 New England Pell Award for Artistic Excellence from Providence (Rhode Island)'s Trinity Repertory Company in honor of his artistic achievements and philanthropic work in Rhode Island.

== Grammy Awards ==
The Grammy Awards are awarded annually by the National Academy of Recording Arts and Sciences. Osborne has received four Grammy nominations.

Year	Category	Nominated work	Result
1984	Best Male R&B Vocal Performance	Stay With Me Tonight	Nominated
1985	Best Male R&B Vocal Performance	Don't Stop	Nominated
1985	Best R&B Performance by a Duo or Group	"The Last Time I Made Love" (w/Joyce Kennedy)	Nominated
2001	Best Traditional R&B Performance	That's For Sure	Nominated

== See also ==
- L.T.D. discography
