= Another Mother Further =

Studio album by Mother's Finest
- Released: 1977
- Recorded: 1976–1977
- Genre: Funk rock
- Length: 34:03
- Label: Epic
- Producer: Tom Werman, Mother's Finest

Mother's Finest chronology
Mother's Finest (1976)	Another Mother Further (1977)	Mother Factor (1978)

Another Mother Further is the third full-length studio album by Atlanta funk-rock group Mother's Finest. It was released in 1977 on Epic Records and co-produced by Tom Werman. It managed to chart two singles, "Baby Love" and "Piece of the Rock".

"Truth'll Set You Free" was covered by R&B group Labelle on their 2008 album, Back to Now, after Nona Hendryx and Joyce Kennedy performed it on the international Daughters of Soul tour in 2004.

== Critical reception ==
Professional ratings
Review scores
Source	Rating
AllMusic	3.5/5 stars

The Bay State Banner wrote that "their guitar riffs are fresh and economical, their keyboard excitingly percussive, and lead voice Joyce Kennedy, accepting her limitations, has made her shouting style into a stinging and irresistible voice."

== Track listing ==
- All songs written by Mother's Finest, except where noted.
1. "Mickey's Monkey" (Lamont Dozier, Brian Holland, Eddie Holland) – 4:42
2. "Baby Love" – 4:23
3. "Thank You for the Love" – 5:04
4. "Piece of the Rock" – 3:23
5. "Truth'll Set You Free" – 4:23
6. "Burning Love" (Dennis Linde) – 4:11
7. "Dis Go Dis Way, Dis Go Dat Way" – 4:14
8. "Hard Rock Lover" – 2:43

== Personnel ==
Mother's Finest

- Joyce Kennedy – lead & backing vocal, percussion
- Glenn Murdock – lead & backing vocal
- Gary Moore – guitars
- Mike Keck – keyboards, synthesizers, additional percussion
- Jerry Seay – bass, drums, percussion
- Barry Borden – drums, percussion

Additional musicians

- Joe Lala, "Raymond", Tom Werman – additional percussion

Production

- Produced by Tom Werman & Mother's Finest
- Recorded & Engineered by Milan Bogdan & Barry Burnett

== Charts ==
=== Weekly charts ===
Chart (1977–1978)	Peak position
Dutch Albums (Album Top 100)	13
US Billboard 200	134

=== Year-end charts ===
Chart (1978)	Position
Dutch Albums (Album Top 100)	61
