= Mother's Finest =

American funk rock band

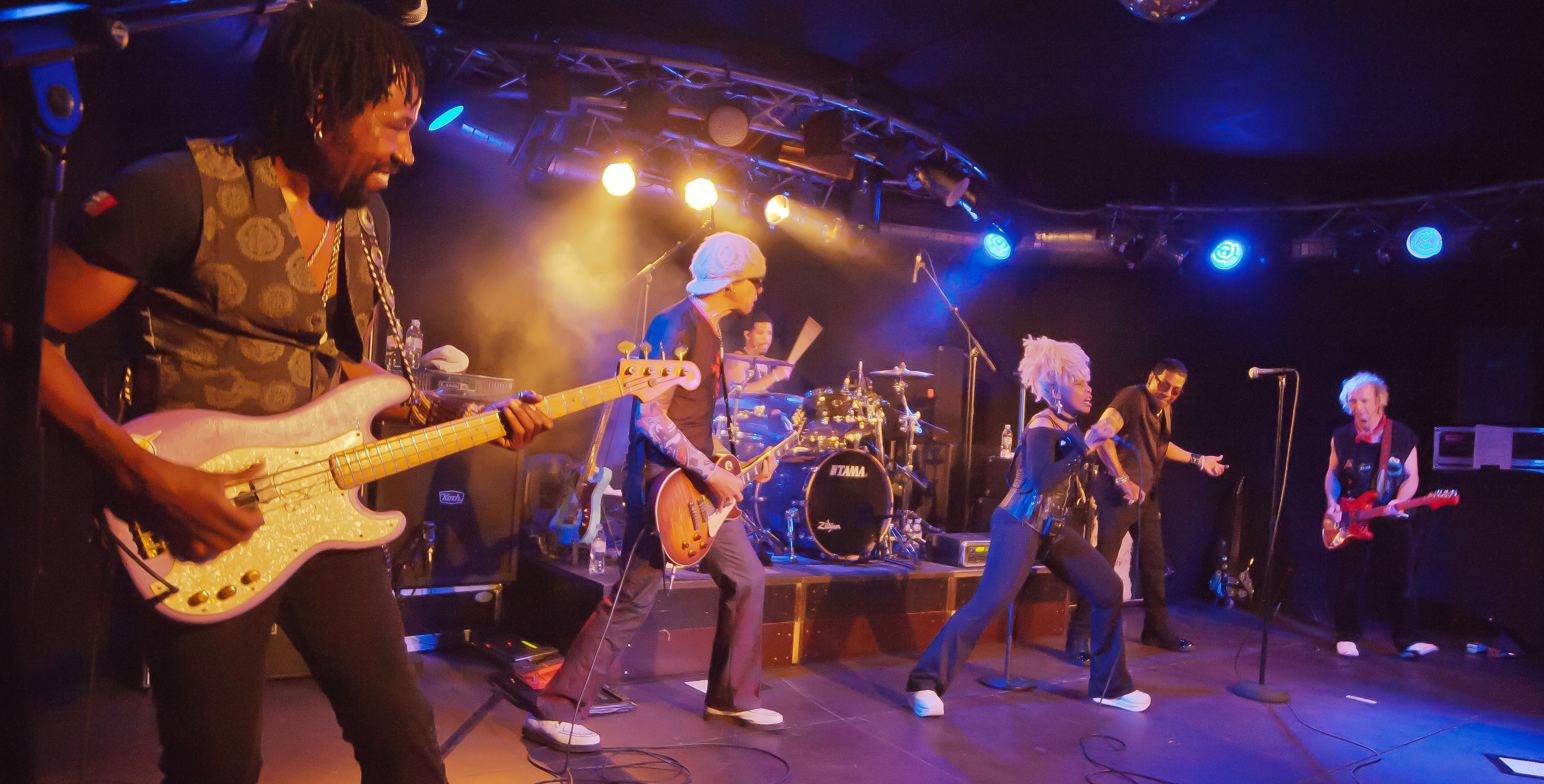
- Mother's Finest in 2011

Background information
- Origin: Chicago, Illinois, U.S.
- Genres: Funk rock; hard rock; funk metal; R&B
- Years active: 1970–present
- Labels: RCA, Epic, Atlantic, Capitol, Scotti Bros., UTR Music, MTM Music, MIG, SPV/Steamhammer
- Members: Joyce Kennedy; Glenn Murdock; Gary Moore; John Hayes; Jerry Seay; R'Jay Nichelle
- Past members: Mike Keck; Danny Vosburgh; Frankie Robbins; Sanford Daniels; Barry Borden; Harold Seay; Doug Bare; Tracey Singleton; Dion Murdock
- Website: mothersfinest.com

Mother's Finest is an American funk rock band, first formed in 1970 and led by the married vocal duo of Joyce "Baby Jean" Kennedy and Glenn "Doc" Murdock. Described by Classic Rock magazine as "Sly and The Family Stone-meets-Led Zeppelin," the band gained notice in the 1970s for their interracial membership and energetic live performances opening for both funk and rock bands. While the band did not find mainstream success during their heyday, they earned belated praise as a formative influence on later bands that combined funk and rock music, such as Living Colour and Red Hot Chili Peppers. They have also been noted as originators of funk metal.

== History ==
=== Classic era ===
Joyce Kennedy, a native of Anguilla, Mississippi who grew up in Chicago, Illinois, was a teen soul singer who had a regional hit in the Chicago area at age 15 with the song "Darling I Still Love You" in 1963. She had been mentored and produced by R&B musician Andre Williams. In 1965 she met Glenn Murdock, another soul singer in the Chicago scene who had been a member of the Vondells, and they later married.

In 1970, Kennedy and Murdock were on tour as singers for jazz bandleader Woody Herman in Dayton, Ohio when they shared a bill with a local blues band and introduced themselves to the band's guitarist Gary "Moses Mo" Moore (not to be confused with the Northern Irish guitarist of the same name). Kennedy and Murdock then relocated to Miami, Florida to start a cover band and invited Moore to join. They soon recruited bassist Jerry "Wyzard" Seay, keyboardist Mike Keck, and drummer Danny Vosburgh and began writing their own music blending their varied interests in rock, soul, and the then-emerging funk genre. After considering the band name Motherfuckers, they decided on Mother's Finest. At the time of their formation, they were described (perhaps inaccurately) as the first interracial or "Black" rock band.

The band signed with RCA Records and released their debut self-titled album in 1972. The band was disappointed with the album and claimed that RCA added instrumental overdubs without their permission. The album was not successful, and a second album planned for release by RCA in 1973 was scrapped. (Some songs from the aborted sessions later appeared on a 2010 reissue of the first album). Vosburgh left the band and was briefly replaced by Frankie Robbins. Mother's Finest were then dropped by RCA. The band spent the next few years building a following in the southeastern United States, with another new drummer, Sanford "Pepe" Daniels.

Now headquartered in Atlanta, Georgia, they were spotted at a gig in that city by producer/A&R executive Tom Werman, who signed the band to Epic Records. Mother's Finest recorded another self-titled album with Werman in 1976. That album gained media notice for the lyrics to the song “Niggizz Can’t Sang Rock ‘n’ Roll," which generated controversy from both black and white audiences. Daniels played on the album but departed before its release due to poor health; he was replaced by Barry "B.B. Queen" Borden, who cemented the band's classic-era lineup. The 1976 album sold well and Mother's Finest were invited to serve as the opening act on arena tours by many notable bands in both funk and rock, with AllMusic describing them as "the most dangerous opening act in rock" as they opened for Aerosmith, Ted Nugent, the Who, AC/DC, and many others. Mother's Finest were well-received by the mostly white audiences during those tours, with the exception of a 1976 gig in which they opened for Black Sabbath and were greeted by disbelief and silence from the crowd.

The band found further success with the 1977 album Another Mother Further, though record company pressure forced the band to add elements of soft rock and disco, resulting in mixed reviews from some critics. Epic Records had difficulty promoting the band, because in that era many major record companies had separate departments for "Black" and "White" music. Mother's Finest also had trouble gaining airplay at both rock and R&B radio stations. The band succumbed to more pressure to appeal to many different audiences on the 1978 album Mother Factor, resulting in more mixed reviews from critics though the album remained on the Billboard pop albums chart for more than 20 weeks. They released the album Mother's Finest Live in 1979, featuring a cover of the Jefferson Airplane song "Somebody to Love." All of the band's albums from 1976 to 1979 were certified gold.

In 1981, Mother's Finest signed with Atlantic Records and attempted to refocus on the rock side of their sound without record company pressure, This led to the departure of Keck, who later enjoyed a successful career in musical theatre. Mother's Finest then released the heavy metal-oriented album Iron Age. The album was unsuccessful but was later recognized as an early example of the funk metal genre that would develop later in the decade. Also in 1981, Kennedy made a guest appearance on the Molly Hatchet album Take No Prisoners. Borden then left the band. The next Mother's Finest album, One Mother to Another, followed in 1983 but was only released in Europe. The album included keyboardist Doug Bare and Jerry Seay's brother Harold on drums.

After that album the band decided to split. Moore and Borden joined the rock band Illusion, appearing on two of that band's albums in the mid-1980s. Borden then transitioned to southern rock with long tenures in Molly Hatchet, the Outlaws, and the Marshall Tucker Band. Mother's Finest went on hiatus for about six years, during which Kennedy released a solo album titled Lookin’ for Trouble. That album included the Billboard Top 40 hit "The Last Time I Made Love," a duet with Jeffrey Osborne. In 1985, Kennedy contributed the song "Didn't I Tell You?" to the soundtrack for the film The Breakfast Club. During this period, Jerry Seay was a member of the backing band for Stevie Nicks, and also briefly joined a revamped lineup of Blackfoot, appearing on the 1987 album Rick Medlocke and Blackfoot.

=== Later years and reunions ===
Mother's Finest regrouped in 1989 with original members Joyce Kennedy, Glenn Murdock, Gary Moore, and Jerry Seay, while drummer Dion Murdock (son of Joyce and Glenn) was added to the lineup. This version of the band released the album Looks Could Kill later in 1989; the album was not popular with fans because it largely dropped the band's rock influences in favor of the pop and R&B styles of the late 1980s. The band described this move as a mistake because they were trying to placate record company executives. Moore then left the band again and was briefly replaced by future Fishbone member Tracey "Spacey T" Singleton. (Dion Murdock also played briefly with Fishbone in later years.) The guitarist position was then filled by John "Red Devil" Hayes, who became a permanent member. The band then signed with Scotti Bros. Records and in 1992 released the unapologetically rock- and metal-oriented album Black Radio Won’t Play This Record, titled after a comment made by a record company executive.

In the early 2000s, Moore again returned to the band to play guitar in conjunction with Hayes. The band released the album Meta-Funk'n-Physical in 2003. They embarked on periodic reunion and nostalgia tours starting in 2004; the band has enjoyed consistent success in Europe and they conduct tours of that continent regularly.

Beginning in 2004, Kennedy contributed to the international Daughters of Soul tour along with Sandra St. Victor, Nona Hendryx, Lalah Hathaway, Indira Khan, and Simone. Seay released the solo album Primal Incantation in 2008. In 2010, heavy metal band Jackyl recorded a cover of the Mother's Finest song "Like a Negro" with a guest appearance by Darryl McDaniels of Run-D.M.C. Jackyl frontman Jesse James Dupree had been in an early band called PG-13 with current Mother's Finest guitarist John Hayes, and had also collaborated with Murdock and Seay at various points over the years. On September 16, 2011, Mother's Finest was inducted into the Georgia Music Hall of Fame. In 2014, the band signed a European record deal with SPV/Steamhammer and released the album Goody 2 Shoes & The Filthy Beast in 2015. An advance single, "Shut Up", was issued "as a present to all their European fans".

Mother's Finest continues to tour actively in the 2020s. Joyce Kennedy, Glenn Murdock, and Jerry Seay have been with the band throughout its history, while Gary Moore has been present for most of that history except for an absence during the 1990s. John Hayes has been present since the early 1990s. Dion Murdock served in the band for more than 30 years until retiring in 2026; he was replaced by R'Jay Nichelle.

== Members ==
Current members of Mother's Finest:

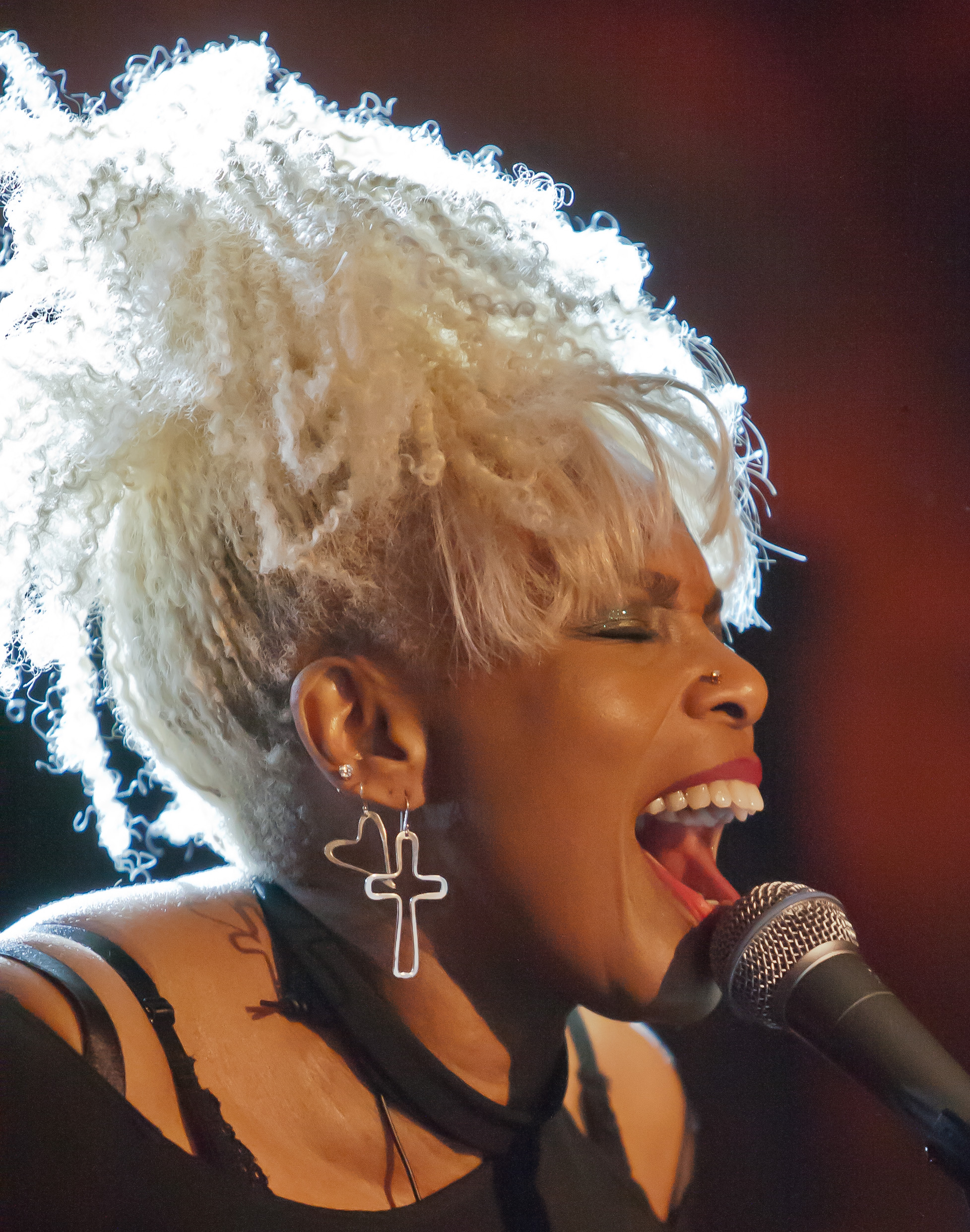
Joyce Kennedy

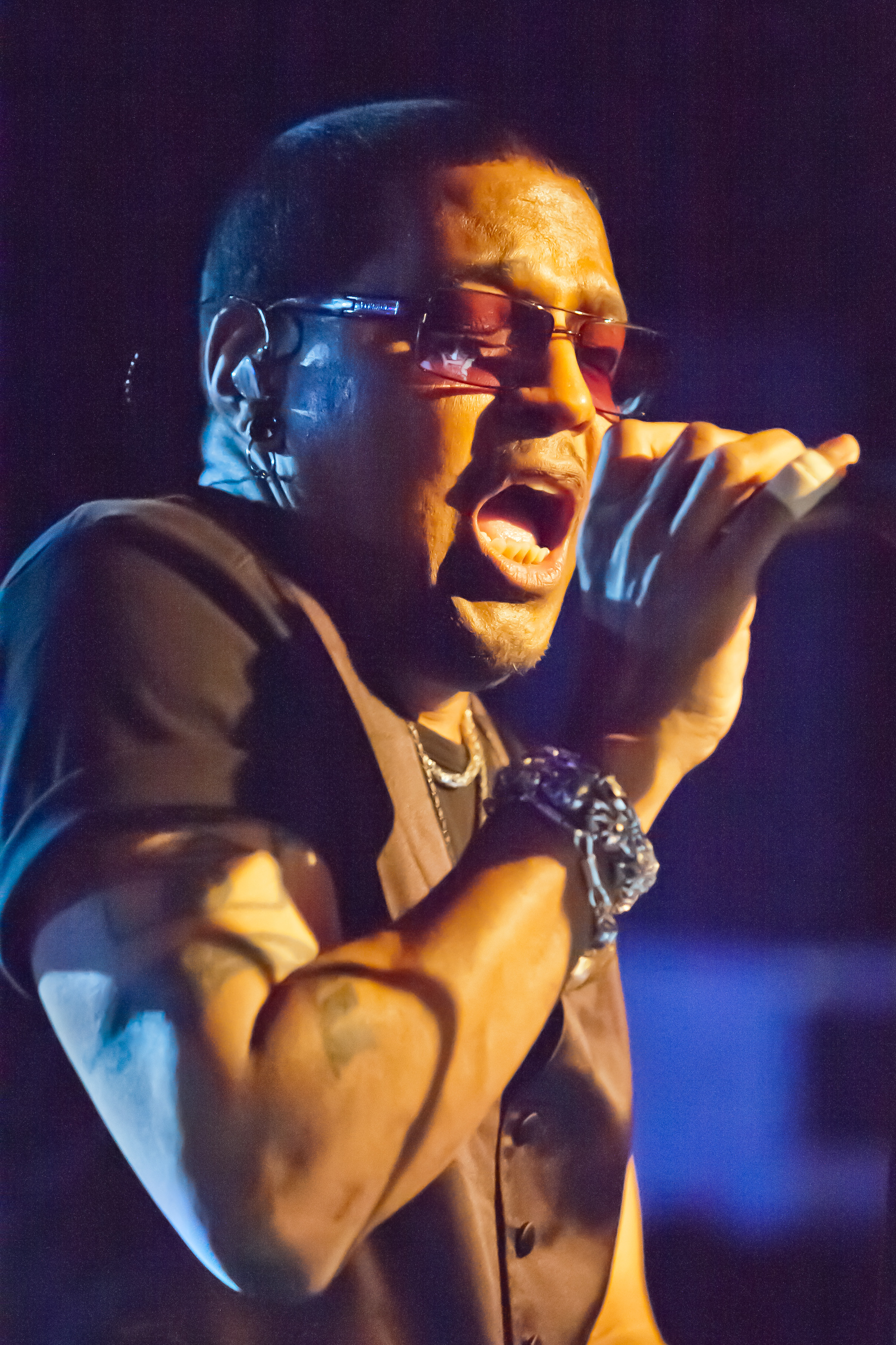
Glenn Murdock

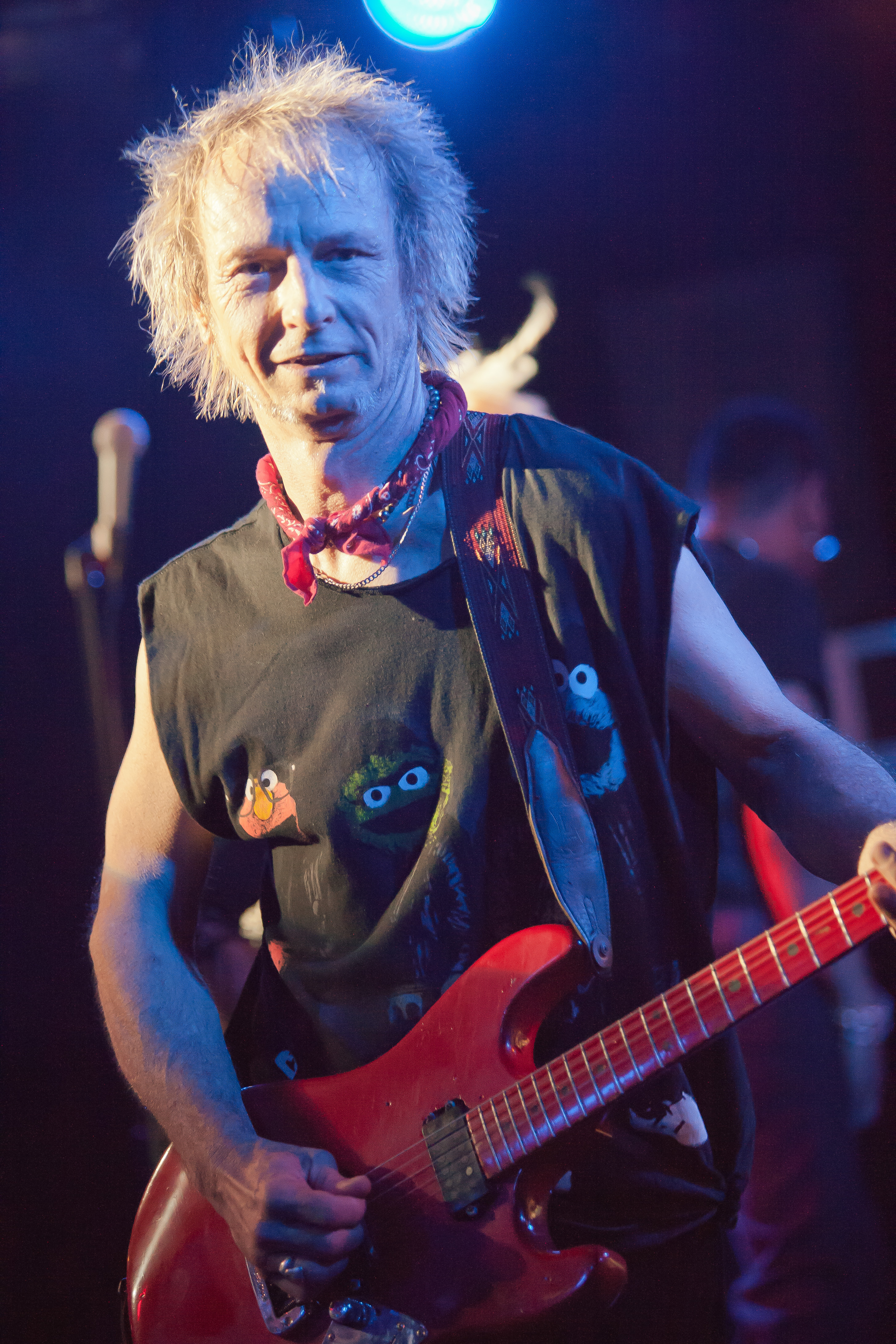
Gary Moore

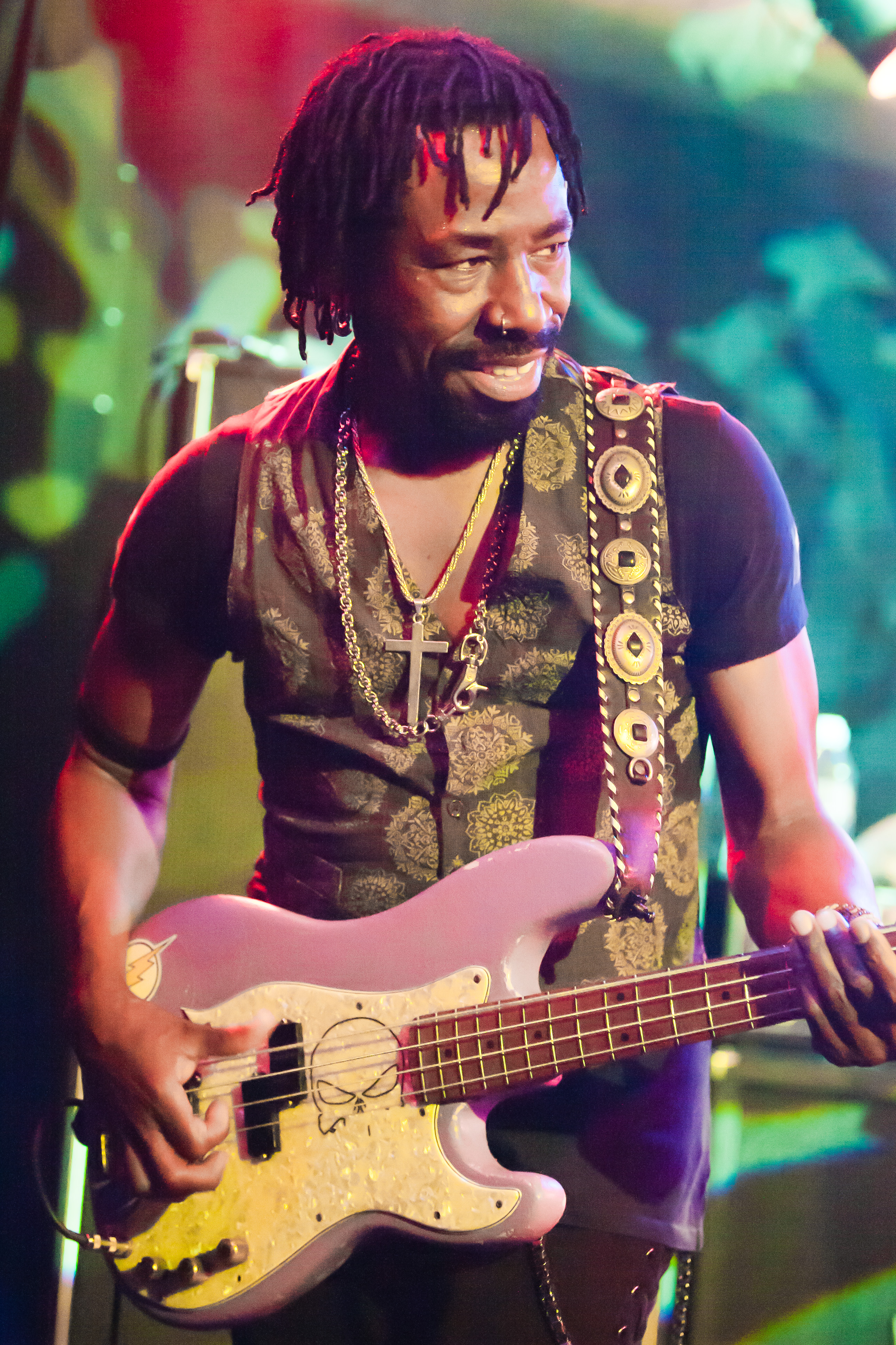
Jerry Seay

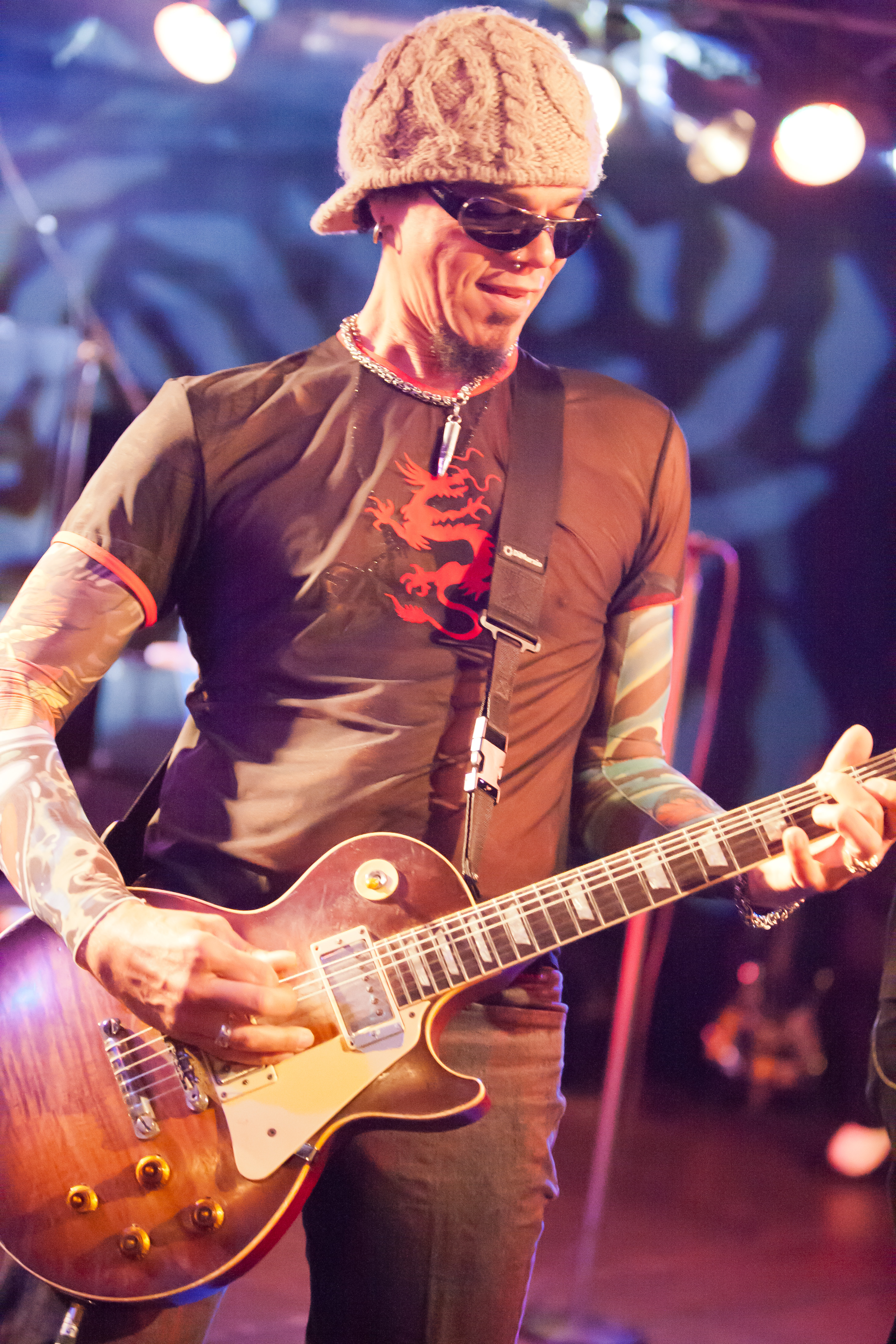
John Hayes

Current

- Joyce "Baby Jean" Kennedy – lead vocals, percussion (1970-1983, 1989-present)
- Glenn "Doc" Murdock – lead vocals, percussion (1970-1983, 1989-present)
- Gary "Moses Mo" Moore – guitar (1970-1983, 1989, 2000-present)
- Jerry "Wyzard" Seay – bass, backing vocals (1970-1983, 1989-present)
- John "Red Devil" Hayes – guitar (1992-present)
- R'Jay Nichelle – drums (2026-present)

Former

- Mike Keck – keyboards, backing vocals (1970-1981)
- Danny Vosburgh – drums (1970-1973)
- Frankie Robbins – drums (1973)
- Sanford "Pepe" Daniels – drums (1973-1976)
- Barry "B.B. Queen" Borden – drums (1976-1981)
- Harold Seay – drums (1983)
- Doug Bare – keyboards (1983)
- Tracey "Spacey T" Singleton – guitar (1989-1992)
- Dion Murdock – drums (1989-2026)

== Discography ==
=== Albums ===
- Mother's Finest (1972)
- Mother's Finest (1976)
- Another Mother Further (1977)
- Mother Factor (1978)
- Mother's Finest Live (live, 1979)
- Iron Age (1981)
- One Mother to Another (1983)
- Looks Could Kill (1989)
- Subluxation (live, 1990)
- Black Radio Won't Play This Record (1992)
- Meta-Funk'n Physical (2003)
- Right Here, Right Now: Live at Villa Berg (live, 2005)
- MF 4D (live, 2011)
- Mother's Finest – Live at Rockpalast 1978 & 2003 (live, 2012)
- Goody 2 Shoes & The Filthy Beasts (2015)

=== Compilations ===
- The Very Best of Mother’s Finest (1990)
- Rock Your Soul (1996)
- The Very Best of Mother’s Finest: Not Yer Mother’s Funk (1997)
- Baby Love (1998)
- Definitive Collection (1998)
- Burning Love: Best (2000)
- Love Changes: The Anthology 1972–1983 (2017)
- The Essential Mother's Finest – The RCA/Epic Years (2019)

=== DVD ===
- Mother's Finest – Live at Rockpalast 1978 & 2003 (2012)
