= Let There Be Funk: The Best of Patrice Rushen =

Greatest hits album by Patrice Rushen
- Released: 1980
- Recorded: 1974–1976
- Genre: R&B; jazz
- Label: Prestige
- Producer: Reggie Andrews

Patrice Rushen chronology
Pizzazz (1979)	Let There Be Funk: The Best of Patrice Rushen (1980)	Posh (1980)

Professional ratings
Review scores
Source	Rating
The Rolling Stone Jazz Record Guide	2/5 stars

Let There Be Funk: The Best of Patrice Rushen is a compilation album by jazz artist Patrice Rushen. Released in 1980, it compiled tracks from her first three albums with Prestige Records. It included all eight tracks from her 1977 album Shout It Out plus one track each from Prelusion and Before the Dawn.

== Track listing ==
1. "Traverse"
2. "What's the Story"
3. "Shout It Out"
4. "The Hump"
5. "Stepping Stones"
6. "Let Your Heart Be Free"
7. "Roll with the Punches"
8. "Let There Be Funk"
9. "Yolon"
10. "Sojourn"
