= Haven't You Heard – The Best of Patrice Rushen =

Greatest hits album by Patrice Rushen
- Released: September 17, 1996
- Genre: R&B; jazz
- Label: Elektra; WEA

Patrice Rushen chronology
Anything but Ordinary (1994)	Haven't You Heard – The Best of Patrice Rushen (1996)	Signature (1997)

Professional ratings
Review scores
Source	Rating
AllMusic	4.5/5 stars

Haven't You Heard – The Best of Patrice Rushen is a compilation by R&B and jazz singer Patrice Rushen. It was released in 1996. This is the first of several greatest hits compilations for Rushen. The album included some of her best-known works, including "Haven't You Heard", "Never Gonna Give You Up", "Forget Me Nots", "Number One", and "Watch Out".

== Critical reception ==
With a 4.5 out of 5 stars rating, Stephen Thomas Erlewine of AllMusic wrote "The songs on Haven't You Heard represent the high watermark of her fusions, which makes the compilation both an excellent introduction and a comprehensive career retrospective."

== Track listing ==
1. "Hang It Up"
2. "When I Found You"
3. "Haven't You Heard"
4. "Settle for My Love"
5. "Givin' It Up Is Givin' Up"
6. "Look Up!"
7. "Never Gonna Give You Up"
8. "Forget Me Nots"
9. "Breakout!"
10. "Remind Me"
11. "Number One" (instrumental)
12. "Feels So Real (Won't Let Go)"
13. "Get Off (You Fascinate Me)"
14. "Watch Out"
