= Anthology (Patrice Rushen album) =

Anthology of Patrice Rushen

Greatest hits album by Patrice Rushen
- Released: 1985
- Genre: R&B
- Length: 57:36
- Label: Elektra

Patrice Rushen chronology
Now (1984)	Anthology of Patrice Rushen (1985)	Watch Out (1987)

Anthology of Patrice Rushen is a compilation of the mainly R&B charting works of Patrice Rushen on the Elektra Records label from nascent late-1970s singles like "Hang It Up" to the then-recent 1984 hit "Feels So Real (Won't Let Go)." Anthology was released just after Rushen's last Elektra studio album Now and just before her Arista Records debut Watch Out!.

This collection was released only in the United States on cassette and LP. There was never a compact disc issue of the release.

== Track listing ==
1. "Remind Me" - 5:15
2. "Feels So Real (Won't Let Go)" - 6:48
3. "Number One (instrumental)" - 4:55
4. "Forget Me Nots" - 4:42
5. "Hang It Up" - 5:11
6. "Look Up" - 3:40
7. "Haven't You Heard" - 6:44
8. "Givin' It Up Is Givin' Up" - 4:58
9. "When I Found You" - 5:20
10. "High In Me" - 4:13
11. "All We Need" - 5:50
