= Patrice (album) =

Studio album by Patrice Rushen
- Released: October 17, 1978
- Recorded: 1978
- Studio: Conway, Hollywood, California; Group IV Recording, Los Angeles, California; Sound Factory, Hollywood, California
- Genre: Soul; funk
- Length: 43:49
- Label: Elektra Records
- Producer: Charles Mims, Jr.; Reggie Andrews; Patrice Rushen

Patrice Rushen chronology
Shout It Out (1977)	Patrice (1978)	Pizzazz (1979)

Patrice is the fourth album by R&B singer Patrice Rushen.

== Critical reception ==
Professional ratings
Review scores
Source	Rating
AllMusic	3/5 stars
People	(favourable)
The Rolling Stone Jazz Record Guide	2/5 stars

Alex Henderson of Allmusic, in a favourable review, stated "Patrice is, in fact, a rewarding R&B/pop effort. Patrice demonstrated that she could be an expressive, charming singer, and her writing or co-writing is solid on cuts that range from the funky "Hang It Up" and the lovely ballad "Didn't You Know?" to the socio-political "Changes (In Your Life)." With Patrice, the Los Angeles native made it clear that she was as appealing as an R&B/pop singer as she had been as a jazz pianist/keyboardist."

== Track listing ==
1. "Music of the Earth" (Patrice Rushen, Angela Rushen) - 3:58
2. "When I Found You" (P. Rushen, Tony Coleman, A. Rushen) - 5:20
3. "Changes (In Your Life)" (P. Rushen, A. Rushen) - 4:08
4. "Wishful Thinking" (P. Rushen) - 5:08
5. "Let's Sing a Song of Love" (P. Rushen, Reggie Andrews) - 3:43
6. "Hang It Up" (P. Rushen) - 5:11
7. "Cha-Cha" (P. Rushen, Sheree North, A. Rushen) - 3:22
8. "It's Just a Natural Thing" (P. Rushen, Freddie Washington) - 3:20
9. "Didn't You Know?" (P. Rushen, Sheree Brown) - 5:17
10. "Play!" (P. Rushen, Charles Mims Jr.) - 4:36

== Personnel ==
- Patrice Rushen – arrangements (1–7, 9), backing vocals (1–4, 6–10), Rhodes piano (1, 2, 5, 6, 7, 9, 10), synthesizers (1), lead vocals (2, 3, 4, 7, 9), percussion (2, 9, 10), clavinet (3, 8, 10), synth bass (3), tambourine (3), acoustic guitar (4), electric grand piano (5, 10), acoustic piano (6), rhythm and lead guitar (8), drums (8, 9), celesta (9), bass (9)
- Charles Mims Jr. – Rhodes piano (4), backing vocals (6), acoustic piano (8), arrangements (8, 10), synthesizers (10)
- Marlo Henderson – guitar (1, 5, 6, 7, 9, 10), Ovation guitar (2), fuzz lead guitar (3)
- Al McKay – guitar (1, 2, 3, 5, 6, 7, 10)
- Abraham Laboriel – acoustic guitar (1), bass (4)
- Paul Jackson Jr. – acoustic rhythm guitar (9), hi-strung guitar (9)
- Freddie Washington – bass (1, 2, 3, 5–8, 10)
- James Gadson – drums (1–7, 10)
- Paulinho da Costa – percussion (1, 4, 5, 7)
- Bill Summers – percussion (6, 7, 10)
- Kim Hutchcroft – alto saxophone (1, 2, 5, 6, 8, 10)
- Larry Williams – tenor saxophone (1, 2, 5, 6, 8, 10), clarinet (4)
- Bill Reichenbach Jr. – trombone (1, 6, 10), baritone (2), bass trombone (5, 8)
- Maurice Spears – bass trombone (1, 2, 6, 10)
- George Bohanon – trombone (5, 8)
- Oscar Brashear – trumpet (1), flugelhorn (2)
- Raymond Lee Brown – trumpet (1, 5, 6, 8, 10), flugelhorn (2, 9)
- Jerry Hey – trumpet (5, 6, 8, 10)
- William Green – clarinet (4)
- Valerie King – flute (4)
- Jeff Clayton – oboe (4)
- Dave Riddles – bassoon (4)
- Kenneth Yerke – whistle (4)
- Clay Lawrey – baritone (9)
- Roy Galloway – backing vocals (1, 2, 3, 5, 6, 9, 10)
- Pauline Wilson – backing vocals (1)
- Syreeta Wright – backing vocals (1–4, 6, 9, 10)
- Jim Gilstrap – backing vocals (2, 3, 5, 8, 10)
- Stephanie Spruill – backing vocals (3, 8)
- Sheree Brown – backing vocals (4, 5, 6, 9)
- Oren Waters – backing vocals (5, 6, 8)
- Reggie Andrews – backing vocals (6)
- Maxine Willard Waters – backing vocals (8)

Handclaps and Fingersnaps

- Gerald Albright, Reggie Andrews, Sheree Brown, Tony Coleman, Roy Galloway, Debra Jones, Tony Lewis, Eric McKain, Charles Mims Jr., Phil Moores, Bill Pegg, Laverne Peterson, Patrice Rushen, Freddie Washington and Oren Waters

Strings (Tracks 1, 2, 4, 5 & 9)

- Patrice Rushen – arrangements and conductor (1, 2, 4, 9)
- Reggie Andrews – arrangements and conductor (5)
- Gerald Vinci – concertmaster (1, 2)
- Charles Veal Jr. – concertmaster (4, 5, 9)
- Ronald Cooper, Selene Hurford, Ray Kelley, Ron Leonard, Edgar Lustgarten and Harry Shlutz – cello
- Denyse Buffum, Rollice Dale, Mark Kovacs, Virginia Majewski, Carole Mukogawa, Art Royval and Barbara Thomason – viola
- Israel Baker, Arnold Belnick, Harry Bluestone, Alfred Breuning, Bonnie Douglas, Assa Drori, Frank Foster, Harris Goldman, Endre Granat, Connie Kupka, Carl LaMagna, Barbara Nord, Henry Roth, Sheldon Sanov, Sandy Seymour, Paul Shure, Barry Socher, Marcia Van Dyke, Dorothy Wade and Kenneth Yerke – violin

== Charts ==
Chart (1979)	Peak position
Billboard Pop Albums	98
Billboard Top Soul Albums	27
Billboard Top Jazz Albums	5

=== Singles ===
Year	Single	Chart positions
Year	Single	US R&B
1979	"Hang It Up"	16
1979	"When I Found You"	87

== Samples & Covers ==
- Hieroglyphics sampled "Didn't You Know?" on their song "You Never Knew" on their album 3rd Eye Vision in 1998.
