= Watch Out (Patrice Rushen album) =

Watch Out!

Studio album by Patrice Rushen
- Released: February 20, 1987
- Recorded: 1986
- Genre: R&B
- Length: 50:39
- Label: Arista
- Producer: Patrice Rushen, Charles Mims Jr., Jerry Knight, Aaron Zigman

Patrice Rushen chronology
Anthology (1985)	Watch Out! (1987)	Anything but Ordinary (1994)

Professional ratings
Review scores
Source	Rating
AllMusic	2/5 stars
The Philadelphia Inquirer	3/5 stars

Watch Out! is a 1987 album released by R&B singer Patrice Rushen. This album was the only album Rushen released with Arista Records after leaving Elektra Records. The album produced several R&B hits for Rushen.

The upbeat title single "Watch Out" was a Billboard top ten R&B hit, also a top twenty dance hit. Other songs such as: "Somewhere," "Anything Can Happen," "All My Love," "Till She's out of Your Mind," "Come Back to Me" and "Tender Lovin" were also popular with her fans.

== Critical reception ==
Jack Lloyd of the Philadelphia Inquirer claimed, "While the Rushen voice is a thin instrument, it is pleasant enough, and Rushen controls it quite effectively. She was involved in writing much of the material here. Rushen has developed into a formidable, versatile talent."

== Track listing ==
1. "Watch Out!" (Patrice Rushen, Sheree Brown) - 5:26
2. "Breakin' All The Rules" (Freddie Washington, Patrice Rushen) - 4:55
3. "Long Time Coming" (Antonina Armato, Richard Feldman) - 4:53
4. "All My Love" (Freddie Washington, Patrice Rushen, Tony Haynes) - 4:47
5. "Somewhere" (Freddie Washington, Jackie English) - 5:09
6. "Anything Can Happen" (Alan Roy Scott, Lotti Golden, Michael Jay) - 5:03
7. "Burnin'" (Patrice Rushen, Wayne Vaughn) - 5:05
8. "Till She's Out Of Your Mind" (Clint Holmes, Patrice Rushen) - 4:11
9. "Come Back to Me" (Lynn Davis, Patrice Rushen) - 5:53
10. "Tender Lovin'" (Patrice Rushen, Roy Galloway) - 5:03

In addition to numerous remixes for the three singles, "Watch Out!" had a non-album B-side, "Over the Phone" (Patrice Rushen/Angela Rushen-Ehigiator).

== Personnel ==
- Patrice Rushen – lead vocals, backing vocals (1, 2, 4, 7–10), keyboards (1, 2, 4), synthesizer programming (1, 2, 4, 7–10), drum programming (1, 2, 4, 7–10), arrangements (1, 2, 4, 7–10), synthesizers (7–10), synth solo (7), acoustic piano (8), keyboard bass (9, 10), acoustic piano solo (10)
- Jerry Knight – all instruments (3, 5, 6), programming (3, 5, 6), synthesizer programming (3, 5, 6), drum programming (3, 5, 6), backing vocals (3, 5, 6), arrangements (3, 5, 6)
- Aaron Zigman – all instruments (3, 5, 6), programming (3, 5, 6), synthesizer programming (3, 5, 6), drum programming (3, 5, 6), arrangements (3, 5, 6)
- Greg Moore – guitars (1, 2, 4, 7, 10)
- James Harrah – guitars (8)
- Freddie Washington – bass (1, 2, 4, 9)
- Nathan East – bass (8)
- Rayford Griffin – drums (4, 10)
- Ricky Lawson – drums (7, 9)
- John Robinson – drums (8)
- Terral Santiel – percussion (1, 2, 4)
- Paulinho da Costa – percussion (4, 9, 10)
- Larry Williams – saxophone solo (5)
- Justo Almario – saxophones (2, 8, 10)
- Jeff Clayton – saxophones (2, 8, 10)
- George Bohanon – trombone (2, 8, 10)
- Maurice Spears – trombone (2, 8, 10)
- Oscar Brashear – trumpet (2, 8, 10)
- Raymond Lee Brown – trumpet (2, 8, 10)
- Lynn Davis – backing vocals (1, 2, 4, 7–10)
- Roy Galloway – backing vocals (1, 2, 4, 7–10)
- Charles Mims Jr. – backing vocals (1, 2)
- Andrea Robinson – backing vocals (8)

== Production ==
- Patrice Rushen – producer (1, 2, 4, 7–10), executive producer (1, 2, 4, 7–10)
- Charles Mims Jr. – producer (1, 2, 4, 7–10)
- Jerry Knight – producer (3, 5, 6)
- Aaron Zigman – producer (3, 5, 6)
- Clive Davis – executive producer (3, 5, 6)
- Peter Chaikin – recording (1, 2, 4, 7–10)
- Richard McKernan – recording (1, 2, 4, 7–10)
- Bobby Brooks – recording (3, 5, 6)
- Mark Dayton – recording (3, 5, 6)
- Daren Klein – recording (3, 5, 6)
- Gary Wagner – recording (3, 5, 6)
- Barney Perkins – mixing (1, 4, 7, 9, 10)
- Paul Lani – mixing (2)
- Mick Guzauski – mixing (3, 5, 6)
- Humberto Gatica – mixing (8)
- Jennie Ciruillo – assistant engineer
- Keith Cohen – assistant engineer
- Jim Dineen – assistant engineer
- Jeff Hoppenstand – assistant engineer
- Stan Katayama – assistant engineer
- Laura Livingston – assistant engineer
- Elliot Peters – assistant engineer
- Ray Pyle – assistant engineer
- Gloria Robertson – assistant engineer
- Philip Walters – assistant engineer
- Doug Sax – mastering
- Todd Grace – keyboard technician
- Ria Lewerke – art direction
- Maude Gilman – design
- Margery Greenspan – design
- Matthew Rolston – photography
- Susan Joseph – management
- Grand Trine Management – management company

Studios

- Recorded at The Crib, Cherokee Studios and Lion Share Recording (Los Angeles, CA); Rock Steady, Baby O'Recorders, Conway Studios and Larrabee Sound Studios (Hollywood, CA); Yamaha Studios (Glendale, CA); Can-Am Recorders (Tarzana, CA).
- Mastered at The Mastering Lab (Hollywood, CA).

== Charts ==
Chart (1987)	Peak position
US Billboard Top Pop Albums	77
US Billboard Top R&B Albums	19

=== Singles ===
Year	Title	US R&B	US Dan
1987	"Watch Out"	9	22
1987	"Anything Can Happen"	51	—
1987	"Come Back to Me"	65	37
