= Al McKay =

American guitarist, songwriter, and record producer (born 1948)

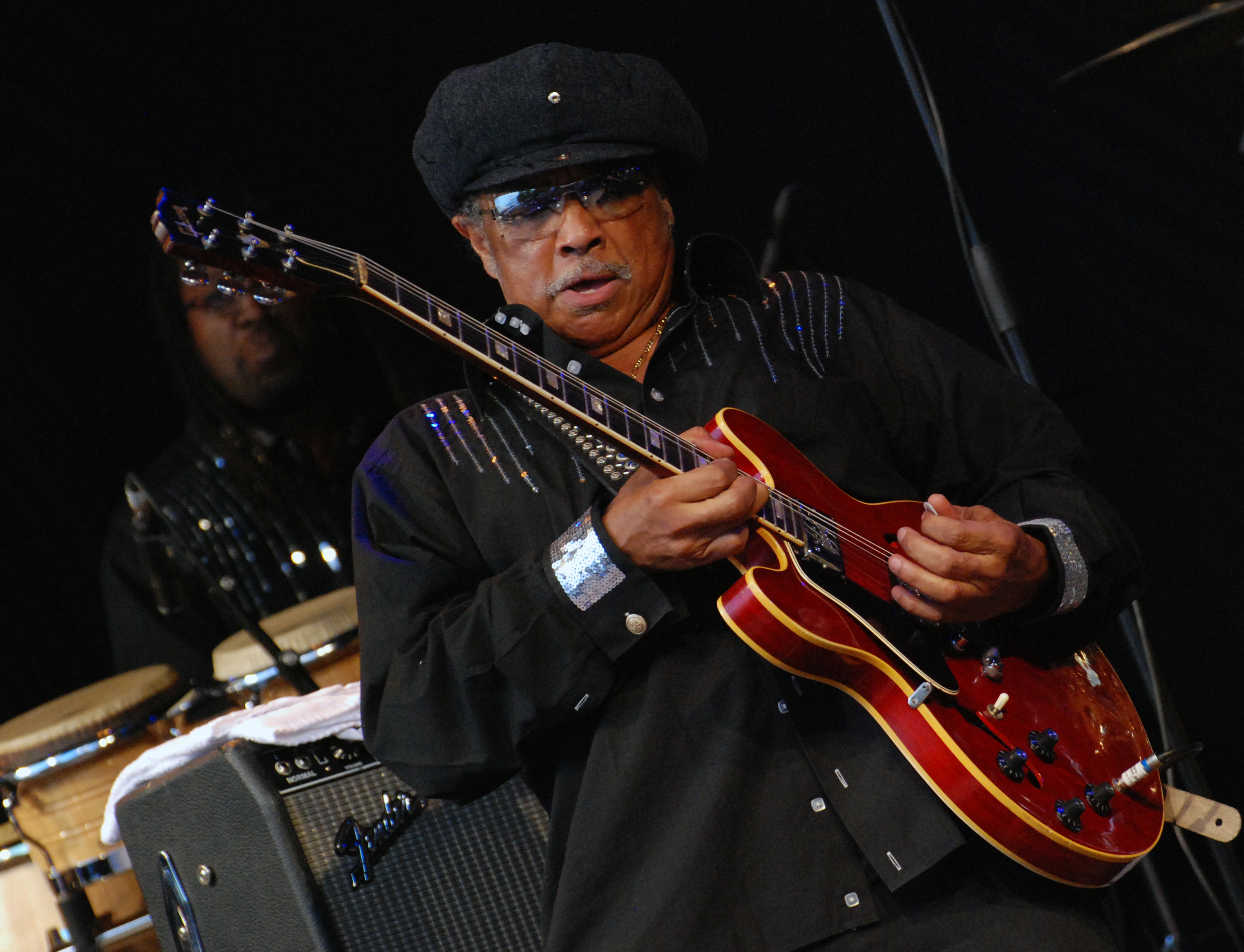
- McKay at Hamar Music Festival 2011

Background information
- Born: February 2, 1948 (age 78); New Orleans, Louisiana, U.S.
- Genres: Funk, jazz, R&B, soul
- Occupations: Musician, songwriter, record producer
- Years active: 1960s–present
- Labels: CBS, ARC, Star Licks, VideoArts (Japan)
- Website: almckay.com

Albert Phillip McKay (born February 2, 1948) is an American guitarist, songwriter, and record producer. He is a former member of The Watts 103rd Rhythm Street Band and Earth, Wind & Fire. As a member of EW&F, during 2000, he was inducted into the Rock and Roll Hall of Fame. He has also worked with artists such as Gene Harris, Patrice Rushen, The Temptations and Ramsey Lewis. McKay also leads his own band called the Al McKay All Stars.

== Biography ==
Born and raised in New Orleans, Louisiana, United States, McKay's first professional gig was as a guitarist for the Ike & Tina Turner Revue. He then went on to become a member of The Watts 103rd Rhythm Street Band. McKay later joined up with the band Earth, Wind & Fire in 1973. He eventually was fired from the group in 1981.

McKay now performs with his band, The Al McKay Allstars, performing a show called The Earth, Wind & Fire Experience. During 2001, the group released a studio album entitled Al Dente. A live album called Live at Mt. Fuji was also issued in 2003.

== Solo work ==
McKay performed on Gene Harris's 1976 album In a Special Way and his 1977 release Tone Tantrum. Along with Eddie Henderson's 1977 LP Comin' Through and Harvey Mason's 1977 album Funk in a Mason Jar. He also played upon Patrice Rushen's 1977 LP Shout It Out, 1978's Patrice, 1979's Pizzazz and her 1980 studio album, Posh. As well, McKay performed on Ramsey Lewis' 1980 LP Routes, Herbie Hancock's 1981 album Magic Windows and A Taste of Honey's 1982 LP Ladies of the Eighties. He later produced Finis Henderson III's single, "Skip to My Lou", as well as his 1983 album Finis. McKay also co-produced The Temptations on their 1984 studio LP Truly for You, and produced Shirley Jones on her 1986 album, Always In the Mood.

He then played on Norman Brown's 1992 album Just Between Us and Ramsey Lewis' 1993 LP Sky Islands. McKay later appeared on Wild Orchid's 1997 self titled debut album, Celine Dion's 1997 LP Let's Talk About Love, CeCe Winans 1998 album His Gift, Dave Koz's 1999 LP The Dance and Incognito's 2010 album Transatlantic R.P.M.

== Songwriting ==
McKay is a prolific songwriter, mostly as a collaborator with Maurice White and other members of Earth, Wind & Fire, but is best known for two R&B chart-topping songs, "Sing a Song" in 1975 for Earth, Wind & Fire, and "Best of My Love" in 1977 for The Emotions, the latter also reaching #1 on the pop chart.

== Legacy ==
Spin placed McKay in their list of the 30 most famous left-handed guitarists of all time. Guitar Player also ranked McKay at No. 25 on their list of the 50 greatest rhythm guitarists of all time. As well guitarists such as Lenny Kravitz have claimed McKay as a major influence.
