= Greg Moore (guitarist) =

American rhythm guitarist

- Genres: Funk, R&B, soul
- Occupation: Musician
- Instrument: electric guitar
- Years active: 1978–present

Greg Moore is an American rhythm guitarist. Moore is a former member of the R&B band Earth, Wind & Fire. He has also worked with artists such as Patrice Rushen, Anita Baker, Stevie Wonder, Roy Ayers and Teena Marie.

== Career ==
=== Earth, Wind & Fire ===
Moore joined the band Earth, Wind & Fire in 2002. He went on to perform on their 2003 studio album The Promise, 2005 LP Illumination and 2013 album Now, Then & Forever.

=== Solo work ===
Moore played on Roy Ayers 1978 album Let's Do It, his 1979 LP Fever, Cheryl Lynn's 1981 album In the Night, Janet Jackson's 1982 self titled debut album and Anita Baker's 1986 LP Rapture. He also performed on Patrice Rushen's 1986 release Watch Out, Gerald Albright's 1987 album Just Between Us, Vanessa Williams 1988 album The Right Stuff, Patrice Rushen's 1994 album Anything but Ordinary and Stevie Wonder's 1995 LP Conversation Peace.

Moore then played on Maxwell's 1997 album Embrya, The Temptations' 1998 album Phoenix Rising, Kirk Whalum's 2003 album Into My Soul, Teena Marie's 2004 album La Doña, her 2006 release Sapphire and Kendrick Lamar's 2015 album To Pimp a Butterfly.
