= Posh (album) =

Studio album by Patrice Rushen
- Released: November 11, 1980
- Recorded: 1980
- Studio: Conway (Hollywood, California); Sound Factory (Los Angeles, California); The Automatt (San Francisco, California)
- Genre: R&B
- Length: 46:42
- Label: Elektra
- Producer: Charles Mims, Jr.; Patrice Rushen

Patrice Rushen chronology
Let There Be Funk: The Best of Patrice Rushen (1980)	Posh (1980)	Straight from the Heart (1982)

Professional ratings
Review scores
Source	Rating
AllMusic	4/5 stars
The Rolling Stone Jazz Record Guide	2/5 stars

Posh is a 1980 album released by R&B singer Patrice Rushen, her third album for Elektra Records and sixth album overall. The album was recently re-released on Wounded Bird Records, as were several other Rushen albums from the time. Following the Pizzazz album, Posh was the continuation of a string of R&B/pop albums that established Rushen as an R&B singer.

"Look Up!," "I Need Your Love," "The Funk Won't Let You Down," "Time Will Tell" highlighted Patrice's reach into R&B territory. Whereas, songs such as the Stevie Wonder-esque "I Need Your Love" and the rock-leaning "Time Will Tell" were representative of her new progressive sound.

This album was released just before her 1982 breakthrough album, Straight from the Heart.

== Track listing ==
1. "Never Gonna Give You Up (Won't Let You Be)" (Patrice Rushen, Freddie Washington) - 6:50
2. "Don't Blame Me" (Patrice Rushen, Angela Rushen, Clarence Bell) - 6:31
3. "Look Up!" (Patrice Rushen, Charles Mims Jr., Sheree Brown) - 3:41
4. "I Need Your Love" (Patrice Rushen, Charles Mims Jr., Angela Rushen) - 4:25
5. "Time Will Tell" (Patrice Rushen, Angela Rushen) - 5:09
6. "The Dream" (Patrice Rushen, Washington, Freddie Brown) - 4:54
7. "The Funk Won't Let You Down" (Patrice Rushen) - 7:35
8. "This Is All I Really Know" (Patrice Rushen, Lynn Davis); Featuring Lynn Davis - 4:41

== Personnel ==
- Patrice Rushen – lead and backing vocals, percussion, arrangements, acoustic piano (1, 5, 7, 8), synth solo (1), rhythm arrangements (1, 3, 4), electric piano (2, 4–7), synthesizers (2), bass (3), synth strings (4), vocal arrangements (8)
- Charles Mims Jr. – acoustic piano (3), synthesizers (3, 4), rhythm arrangements (3, 4)
- Paul Jackson Jr. – guitar (1, 2, 5, 7), acoustic guitar (6)
- David T. Walker – guitar (1, 6, 8)
- Wali Ali – lead vocals (1), guitar (2, 4)
- Marlo Henderson – guitar (3, 5, 7)
- Freddie Washington – bass (1, 2, 4–8), backing vocals (1), rhythm arrangements (1)
- James Gadson – drums (1, 8)
- Leon "Ndugu" Chancler – drums (2, 3, 6)
- Melvin Webb – drums (4, 5)
- Gerry Brown – drums (7)
- Eddie "Bongo" Brown – percussion (1, 3)
- Kenneth Yerke – high whistling (6)
- Roy Galloway – backing vocals (1, 5–8)
- Lynn Davis – backing vocals (3–8), vocal ad-lib solo (8), vocal arrangements (8)
- Wanda Vaughn – backing vocals (3)
- Jim Gilstrap – backing vocals (7, 8)

Handclaps

- Kevin R. Carter Sr.
- Ulysses Duprée
- Tony Lewis
- Charles Mims Jr.
- Lindsey Redmond
- Larry Robinson
- Patrice Rushen
- Freddie Washington

Horns

- Don Myrick – alto saxophone
- William Green – tenor saxophone
- Clay Lawrey – trombone, baritone
- Maurice Spears – bass trombone
- Oscar Brashear – trumpet, flugelhorn
- Raymond Lee Brown – trumpet, flugelhorn, flugelhorn solo (4), horn contractor

Strings

- Charles Veal Jr. – concertmaster, violin solo (6)
- Rosemary McLean – contractor
- Paula Hochhalter and Nils Oliver – cello
- Denyse Buffam, Rollice Dale, Virginia Majewski and Barbara Thomason – viola
- Israel Baker, Arnold Belnick, Assa Drori, Frank Foster, Endre Granat, Bob Sanov, Sheldon Sanov, Marcia Van Dyke, Dorothy Wade and Kenneth Yerke – violin

=== Production ===
- Patrice Rushen – producer, executive producer
- Charles Mims Jr. – producer
- Freddie Washington – production assistance (3)
- Peter Chaikin – recording engineer
- Phil Moores – additional recording
- Jeff Titmus – additional rhythm recording (7)
- F. Byron Clark – remixing
- Jeff Sanders – mastering
- Crystal Sound (Los Angeles, California) – mastering location
- Ron Coro – art direction, design
- Norm Ung – art direction, design
- Bobby Holland – photography
- Shayne Fair – additional photography
- Pam Robinson – additional photography
- Joel Leonard – set design consultant
