= The Meeting (Patrice Rushen album) =

Studio album by The Meeting
- Released: August 21, 1990
- Studio: Fox Run Studios (San Fernando, California).
- Genre: R&B
- Length: 59:24
- Label: GRP Records
- Producer: The Meeting

The Meeting chronology
The Meeting (1990)	Update (1995)

Professional ratings
Review scores
Source	Rating
Allmusic	3/5 stars

The Meeting is the first album release from a collaboration of musicians R&B keyboardist/singer Patrice Rushen, saxophonist Ernie Watts, bassist Alphonso Johnson and drummer Leon "Ndugu" Chancler, and was released in 1990 on GRP Records. The recording was the end product of several years of live interaction between the four members, often backing other artists; the album is representative of early 1990s jazz fusion. The band recorded a follow-up album titled Update (without Johnson), which was released in 1995 on the Hip-Bop label. Rushen's next solo album was Anything but Ordinary, released in 1994.

== Track listing ==
1. "Groove Now and Then" (Patrice Rushen) - 5:58
2. "Walk Your Talk" (Rushen, Ndugu Chancler, Alphonso Johnson, Ernie Watts) - 4:28
3. "Steppin' Out" (Chancler, Johnson) - 5:16
4. "And I Think About It All the Time" (Watts, Ray Dewey) - 5:20
5. "The Meeting" (Rushen) - 5:04
6. "African Flower" (Duke Ellington) - 5:20
7. "Joyful Noise" (Watts, Bob Boykin) - 5:20
8. "Cherry Blossom" (Rushen) - 4:53
9. "Lowness" (Chancler) - 4:38
10. "Element of Mystery" (Chancler) - 4:53
11. "Virgin" (Johnson) - 4:19
12. "Tango" (Chancler) - 4:55

== Personnel ==
The Meeting

- Patrice Rushen – acoustic grand piano, Yamaha SY77, Yamaha DX7 II-FD, Yamaha KX-88, Yamaha KX-5, Yamaha TX816, Yamaha TX16W, Yamaha RX-5 drum machine
- Alphonso Johnson – 4-string and 5-string basses, fretless bass
- Leon "Ndugu" Chancler – drums, cymbals, percussion, timbales, rapping (3)
- Ernie Watts – alto saxophone, soprano saxophone, tenor saxophone, Yamaha WX7
