= Now (Patrice Rushen album) =

Studio album by Patrice Rushen
- Released: May 21, 1984
- Recorded: 1983–1984
- Studios: The Crib, Los Angeles; Conway, Hollywood; Additional recording at Larrabee, North Hollywood
- Genres: R&B; soul pop; jazz-funk; dance
- Length: 49:05
- Label: Elektra
- Producers: Cornelius Mims, Jr.; Patrice Rushen

Patrice Rushen chronology
Straight from the Heart (1982)	Now (1984)	Anthology (1985)

Professional ratings
Review scores
Source	Rating
Allmusic	4/5 stars
The Rolling Stone Jazz Record Guide	3/5 stars

Now is the eighth studio album by American singer-songwriter and pianist Patrice Rushen issued in May 1984 on Elektra Records. The album rose to No. 7 on the Billboard Traditional Jazz Albums chart, No. 4 on the Billboard Top Soul Albums chart and No. 40 on the Billboard 200 chart.

== Singles ==
"Feels So Real (Won't Let Go)" rose to No. 3 on the Billboard Hot Soul Songs chart and No. 10 on the Billboard Dance Club Songs chart. "Get Off (You Fascinate Me)" also got to No. 26 on the Billboard Hot Soul Songs chart.

== Track listing ==
All tracks composed by Patrice Rushen and Freddie "Ready Freddie" Washington; except where indicated.

1. "Feels So Real (Won't Let Go)" (Rushen) - 6:48
2. "Gone with the Night" - 4:40
3. "Gotta Find It" (Rushen, Roy Galloway) - 4:26
4. "Superstar" (Rushen, Romeo Williams) - 4:56
5. "Heartache Heartbreak" - 4:10
6. "Get Off (You Fascinate Me)" - 6:18
7. "My Love's Not Going Anywhere" (Rushen, Roy Galloway) - 4:18
8. "Perfect Love" - 4:54
9. "High in Me" (Rushen, Syreeta Wright) - 4:13
10. "To Each His Own" (Rushen, Lynn Davis) - 4:12

== Personnel ==
- Patrice Rushen – backing vocals, synthesizers, Rhodes piano (1, 3, 5–10), electric grand piano (2, 4), lead vocals (2, 4, 7, 9, 10), synth bass (6); rhythm, synthesizer and vocal arrangements
- Paul Fox – synthesizer programming
- Greg Moore – guitar (1, 3, 4, 6–9)
- Marlo Henderson – guitar (2)
- Freddie Washington – bass (1, 6–10), rhythm arrangements (1, 8), backing vocals (8)
- Romeo Williams – bass (4)
- Paulinho da Costa – timbales (1), percussion (6, 9)
- Harvey Mason – cymbals (5, 7), tom tom fills (5), Simmons toms (7, 9)
- Gerald Albright – saxophone solo (5), bass (6)
- Roy Galloway – backing vocals (1, 3, 7, 8)
- Lynn Davis – backing vocals (5, 6)
- Jim Gilstrap – backing vocals (5, 6)

== Production ==
- Patrice Rushen – producer, executive producer, assistant engineer
- Charles Mims Jr. – producer
- Peter Chaikin – recording engineer
- Sabrina Buchanek – assistant engineer
- Paul Ericksen – assistant engineer
- Ross Pallone – assistant engineer
- Csaba Petocz – assistant engineer
- Jeff Stebbins – assistant engineer
- F. Byron Clark – remixing
- John Golden – mastering
- Betty Chow – art direction, design
- Cathy Henszey – art direction, design
- Bobby Holland – album photography
- Peter Breza – photography assistant
- Roger Dong – photography assistant
- Jacqueline Sallow – inner sleeve photography
- Sherwin Bash – management

Studios

- Recorded at The Crib (Los Angeles, CA); Conway Studios and Larrabee Sound Studios (Hollywood, CA).
- Remixed at Soundcastle and Hollywood Sound Recorders (Hollywood, CA).
- Mastered at K Disc Mastering (Hollywood, CA).
