= Steal the Night =

Steal the Night may refer to:

- Steal the Night (song), a 1981 song by Stevie Woods
- Steal the Night: Live at the Glenn Gould Studio, a live CD/DVD by Holly Cole
- Steal the Night, an album by Cindy Bullens
