= Raymond Lee Brown =

American jazz musician

Raymond Lee Brown is an American trumpeter and flugelhornist. Brown was a longtime member of the Earth, Wind & Fire Horns.

== Influences ==
Brown was born and raised in South Central Los Angeles. While in high school, Brown was friends with Gary Bias, Gerald Albright, Patrice Rushen, and Leon "Ndugu" Chancler. In the mid-1980s, he became a member of the Pan Afrikan Peoples Arkestra or "the Ark", of South Park, Los Angeles. During 1987 Brown joined Earth, Wind & Fire alongside two other members of the Ark, saxophonist Bias and trombonist Reggie Young. Before Earth, Wind & Fire, Brown was a member of Madagascar, a group composed of session musicians that recorded one album – Spirit of the Street – under the Arista label in 1981.

== Performances ==
In 1997, Brown was a member of Whitney Houston's band on her Pacific Rim Tour. Brown was also the solo flugelhorn player for Yanni in 1995 (Yanni: Live at Royal Albert Hall). Brown gave a practically flawless flugelhorn performance of the Yanni composition "Dance With a Stranger".

== Discography ==
Earth, Wind & Fire

- Evil Roy, Columbia Records (1987); OCLC 658836632
- Millennium, Reprise Records (1993); OCLC 28865667
- In the Name of Love, Rhino Records (distributor) (1997); OCLC 37628513
- The Promise, Kalimba (2003); OCLC 473755647
- Live by Request, SMV Enterprises (2002); OCLC 475047218
- Live in Japan (DVD video, CD audio, DVD audio), Eagle Rock Entertainment (2008); OCLC 263436220

Sideman with Patrice Rushen (jazz)

- Patrice, Elektra Records 6E-160-A (1978); OCLC 5278041
- Pizzazz, Elektra Records 243 (1979; OCLC 6039308
- Signature, Discovery Records (1997); OCLC 37512023
- Posh, Elektra Records (1980); OCLC 29032775
- Straight From The Heart, Elektra Records (1982)

Sideman with jazz artists

- Donald Byrd, Places and Spaces, Blue Note Records BN-XW726-Y (1975); OCLC 4654046
- Manfredo Fest, Manifestations, Tabu Records JZ35636 (1978); OCLC 6592406
- Hubert Laws, Land of Passion, Columbia Records JC35708 (1979); OCLC 5629298
- Hubert Laws, Make It Last, Columbia Records (1983); OCLC 10173943
- Gerald Wilson's Orchestra of the 90s, Jenna, Discovery Records (1985); OCLC 20866660
- Norman Brown, Just Between Us Motown 37463-7000-4 (1992); OCLC 27033894
- Norman Brown, After the Storm, Mo Jazz (1994); OCLC 31271396
- Art Porter, Jr., Straight to the Point, Verve Forecast 314-517997-2 (1993); OCLC 28541666
- George Duke, Is Love Enough, Warner Bros. Records 46494 (1997); OCLC 36686732
- Vernell Brown, Jr., Stay Tuned, A&M Records 75021-5382-2 (1992); OCLC 25908153
- Kiyotaka Sugiyama, Add Water, Warner Music Japan Inc. (1994); OCLC 45477070
- Daryle Chinn, From the Heart, Motown (1996); OCLC 34922017
- Norman Brown, Better Days Ahead, Motown (1996); OCLC 35189239
- Art Porter, Jr., For Art's Sake, Verve Forecast (1998); OCLC 178729324

Sideman with funk, soul, and R&B artists

- Parlet, Play Me or Trade Me, Casablanca Records (1980); OCLC 27149404
- Con Funk Shun, Spirit of Love, Mercury Records 6337 102 (1980); OCLC 7123609
- Madagascar, Spirit Of The Street, Arista Records AL 9565 (1981); OCLC 613452689
- Marvin Gaye, In Our Lifetime, Tamla T8-374M1
- Chuck Cissel, If I Had The Chance, Arista Records (1982)
- DeBarge, All This Love, Motown (1982); OCLC 9699657
- Billy Griffin, Respect, Columbia Records FC 38924 (1983); OCLC 11892313
- Whitney Houston, I'm Your Baby Tonight, Arista Records (1990); OCLC 22769403
- Salif Keita, Amen, Mango Records (1991); OCLC 24278696
- Tony! Toni! Toné!, Sons of Soul, PolyGram (1993); OCLC 28453464
- Cleopatra, Comin' Atcha!, Maverick Records (1998); OCLC 39451663
- Sandro, Clásico Sony Records (1994); OCLC 459796650
- Lou Rawls, Seasons 4 U, Rawls & Brokaw Records (1998); OCLC 41014136
- Lionel Richie, Renaissance, Island Records (2000); OCLC 46596769
