= Pizzazz =

Studio album by Patrice Rushen
- Released: October 23, 1979
- Recorded: 1978–1979
- Studio: Conway (Hollywood, California)
- Genre: Disco; R&B; jazz funk
- Length: 38:44
- Label: Elektra
- Producer: Charles Mims, Jr.; Patrice Rushen; Reggie Andrews

Patrice Rushen chronology
Patrice (1978)	Pizzazz (1979)	Let There Be Funk: The Best of Patrice Rushen (1980)

Pizzazz is the fifth album by American singer Patrice Rushen, released in 1979 on Elektra Records.

== Critical reception ==
Professional ratings
Review scores
Source	Rating
AllMusic	3/5 stars
DownBeat	1/5 stars

The Boston Globe called Pizzazz a "really a good disco album, with a few non-disco numbers to break the monotony... The non-disco cuts are slower funk tunes which often recall Earth, Wind and Fire." Steven Reddicliffe of the Miami Herald called the album "jolly, sweet, optimistic ... and a very happy dance record at that."

Alex Henderson of AllMusic wrote, "Rushen's profile in the R&B world continued to increase with Pizzazz, her second album for Elektra and fifth overall... Drawing on such influences as Earth, Wind & Fire, Minnie Riperton, Stevie Wonder, and the Emotions, Rushen has no problem holding an R&B lover's attention... Pizzazz might have received tongue-lashings from jazz critics, but from an R&B/pop perspective, it's among Rushen's most rewarding and essential albums."

== Singles ==
Pizzazz features a hit single entitled "Haven't You Heard." The single soared to the top of R&B radio playlists and is among Rushen's biggest hits.

== Track listing ==
No.	Title	Writer(s)	Length
1.	"Let the Music Take Me"	Patrice Rushen; Sheree Brown	6:51
2.	"Keepin' Faith in Love"	P. Rushen; Angela Rushen	4:08
3.	"Settle for My Love"	P. Rushen; Freddie Washington; Brown	5:15
4.	"Message in the Music"	P. Rushen	3:01
5.	"Haven't You Heard"	P. Rushen; Charles Mims Jr.; Washington; Brown	6:45
6.	"Givin' It Up Is Givin' Up"	P. Rushen; Washington; A. Rushen	4:59
7.	"Call On Me"	P. Rushen; A. Rushen; Brown	6:48
8.	"Reprise (Message in the Music)"	P. Rushen	0:57

== Personnel ==
- Patrice Rushen – lead vocals (1–3, 5–7), backing vocals (1–7), electric piano (1–3, 5–7), synth solo (1), percussion (1, 3, 5–7), acoustic piano (2, 4, 5, 7, 8), drums (3, 6), tambourine (4, 8), clavinet (6); horn, string and vocal arrangements
- Paul Jackson Jr. – guitars (1, 4, 8)
- Marlo Henderson – guitars (1, 2, 7)
- Al McKay – guitars (2)
- Wah Wah Watson – guitars (4, 6, 8), backing vocals (6)
- Wali Ali – guitars (5, 7)
- Freddie Washington – bass, acoustic guitar (3), drums (6), percussion (6)
- Leon "Ndugu" Chancler – drums (1, 4, 8)
- James Gadson – drums (2)
- Melvin Webb – congas (1), drums (5, 7)
- Bill Summers – percussion (2)
- Lynn Davis – backing vocals (1, 3–8)
- Roy Galloway – backing vocals (1, 3, 6, 7)
- Josie James – backing vocals (1, 4, 5, 7, 8)
- Pauline Wilson – backing vocals (2)
- Syreeta Wright – backing vocals (2)
- Jim Gilstrap – backing vocals (4, 6, 8)
- D. J. Rogers – lead vocals (6)

Handclaps

- Tony Lewis
- Charles Mims Jr.
- Phil Moores
- Chip Orlando
- Larry Robinson
- Patrice Rushen
- Freddie Washington

Horns / Horn contractors

- Gerald Albright – reeds
- William Green – reeds
- Clay Lawrey – trombone, baritone
- Maurice Spears – bass trombone
- Oscar Brashear – trumpet, flugelhorn
- Raymond Lee Brown – trumpet, flugelhorn

Strings

- Charles Veal Jr. – concertmaster (1, 3–8)
- Gerald Vinci – concertmaster (2)
- Rosemary McLean – contractor
- Marilyn Baker, Harry Bluestone, Ronald Cooper, Endre Granat, William Henderson, Carl LaMagna, Robert Lipsett, Nils Oliver, Jerome Reisler, Art Royval, Terudo Shoenbrun, Robert Sushell, Barbara Thomason, Charles Veal Jr. and Kenneth Yerke – string performers

Production

- Patrice Rushen – executive producer, producer
- Reggie Andrews – producer
- Charles Mims Jr. – producer
- Peter Chaikin – engineer
- Chris Gordon – assistant engineer
- Phil Moores – assistant engineer
- Chip Orlando – assistant engineer
- F. Byron Clark – remixing
- Chris Bellman – mastering at Allen Zentz Mastering (San Clemente, California)
- Ron Coro – art direction, design
- Norman Seeff – front cover and sleeve photography
- Moshe Brakha – back cover photography

== Charts ==
Chart (1980)	Peak position
Billboard Pop Albums	39
Billboard Top Soul Albums	11
Billboard Top Jazz Albums	2

=== Singles ===
Year	Single	Chart positions		
Year	Single	US Pop	US R&B	US Dance
1980	"Givin' It Up Is Givin' Up"	-	47	-
1980	"Haven't You Heard"	42	7	5
1980	"Let the Music Take Me"	-	50	-
