= Blues for Walls =

Studio album by Hampton Hawes
- Released: 1973
- Recorded: January 16–18, 1973
- Studio: Fantasy Studios, Berkeley, California
- Genre: Jazz
- Length: 39:26
- Label: Prestige; PR 10060
- Producer: Orrin Keepnews

Hampton Hawes chronology
Universe (1972)	Blues for Walls (1973)	Live at the Jazz Showcase in Chicago (1973)

Blues for Walls is an album by jazz pianist/keyboardist Hampton Hawes recorded for the Prestige label in 1973.

== Reception ==
Professional ratings
Review scores
Source	Rating
Allmusic	2/5 stars

Scott Yanow of Allmusic states, "For a few years (mostly 1972-74), pianist Hampton Hawes spent time exploring electric keyboards. His music became funkier and less distinctive, but his recordings from the era (which are mostly out of print) are certainly quite listenable, if a bit dated in places".

== Track listing ==
All compositions by Hampton Hawes.

1. "Blues for Walls" – 7:50
2. "Sun's Dance" – 7:12
3. "Hamp's Collard Green Blues" – 4:10
4. "Brother Brantley" – 4:55
5. "Rain Forest" – 5:17
6. "Carmel" – 5:25
7. "Me-Ho" – 4:37

== Personnel ==
- Hampton Hawes – piano, electric piano, synthesizer
- Oscar Brashear – trumpet (tracks 1, 2, 4, 5 & 7)
- Hadley Caliman – soprano saxophone, tenor saxophone (tracks 1, 2, 4, 5 & 7)
- George Walker – guitar
- Henry Franklin – bass, electric bass
- Ndugu – drums
