= Open Strings =

Studio album by Jean-Luc Ponty
- Released: 1971
- Recorded: December 1971
- Studio: MPS-Studio (Villingen, Germany)
- Genre: Jazz
- Length: 39:54
- Label: MPS
- Producer: Jean-Luc Ponty

Jean-Luc Ponty chronology
King Kong: Jean-Luc Ponty Plays the Music of Frank Zappa (1969)	Open Strings (1971)	Upon the Wings of Music (1975)

Professional ratings
Review scores
Source	Rating
All About Jazz	4.5/5 stars
AllMusic	4.5/5 stars
The Guardian	3/5 stars
The Rolling Stone Jazz Record Guide	3/5 stars

Open Strings is an album by French jazz fusion artist Jean-Luc Ponty, released in 1971 on vinyl by the MPS label.

== Track listing ==
All songs written by Jean-Luc Ponty, except where noted.

Side one

1. "Flipping, Pt.1" – 4:40
2. "Flipping, Pt.2" – 10:40
3. "Flipping, Pt.3" – 5:33

Side two

1. "Open Strings" – 15:40
2. "Sad Ballad" (Joachim Kühn) – 4:11

== Personnel ==
- Jean-Luc Ponty – violin
- Philip Catherine – guitar
- Joachim Kühn – keyboards
- Peter Warren – double bass
- Oliver Johnson – drums

Technical

- Rolf Donner – engineer
- Willi Fruth – engineer, recording director
- Bernhard Wetz – design
- Anno Wilms – cover photography
- Hans Harzheim – inside, riverside photography
- Joachim E. Berendt – producer, liner notes

Recorded at MPS-Studio, Villingen, Germany, December 1971.
