= Signature (Patrice Rushen album) =

Studio album by Patrice Rushen
- Released: 1997
- Genre: R&B
- Length: 59:24
- Label: Discovery
- Producer: Patrice Rushen

Patrice Rushen chronology
The Meeting (1990)	Signature (1997)	The Essentials, Patrice Rushen (2002)

Professional ratings
Review scores
Source	Rating
Allmusic	4/5 stars

Signature is the twelfth album by R&B singer Patrice Rushen.

== Track listing ==
All songs written by Patrice Rushen except where noted.

1. "Almost Home" - 4:26
2. "Days Gone By" - 5:04
3. "The Sweetest Taboo" (Sade, Martin Ditcham) - 5:21
4. "Sneaky Pete" - 4:12
5. "Softly" - 6:11
6. "Hurry up This Way Again" (Cynthia Biggs) - 6:03
7. "L 'Ésprit de Joie (The Spirit of Joy)" - 4:40
8. "Wise Ol' Souls" - 4:30
9. "Oneness" - 5:00
10. "Arrival" - 4:33

== Personnel ==
- Patrice Rushen – synthesizer programming, drum programming, keyboards (1–6, 8–10), vocals (3, 6), acoustic piano (7)
- Doc Powell – guitar (1, 2, 4, 8)
- Paul Jackson Jr. – guitar (3, 6, 10)
- Freddie Washington – bass (4, 6, 8, 10)
- Neil Stubenhaus – bass (7)
- Leon "Ndugu" Chancler – drums (1, 2, 6, 7, 9, 10)
- Alvino Bennett – drums (4, 8)
- Munyungo Jackson – percussion (1, 2, 4, 5, 7, 8)
- Paulinho da Costa – percussion (3, 6, 10)
- Gary Bias – soprano saxophone (5)
- Kirk Whalum – tenor saxophone (6)
- Gerald Albright – alto saxophone (7)
- Raymond Lee Brown – muted trumpet (5)
- Jeff Ramsey – vocals (3)
