= Leon "Ndugu" Chancler =

American drummer (1952–2018)

Ndugu Chancler
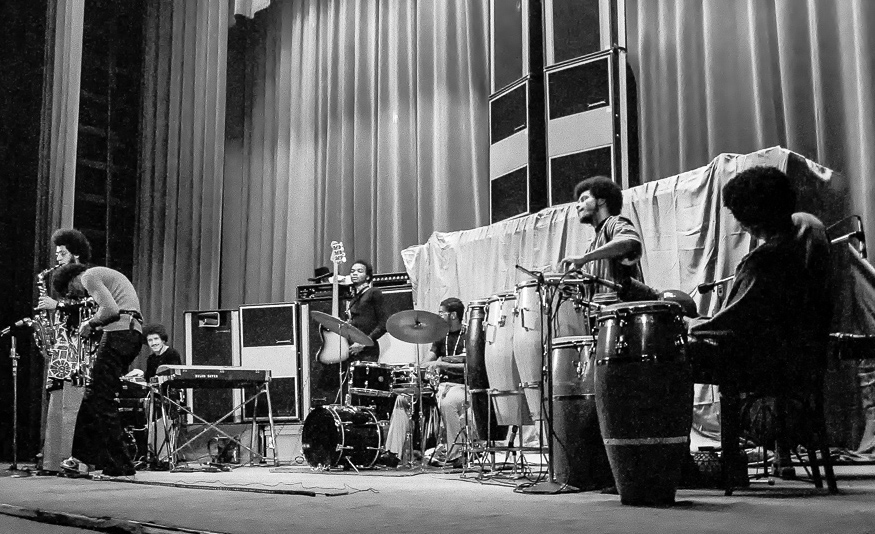

Background information
- Born: Leon Ndugu Chancler; July 1, 1952; Shreveport, Louisiana, U.S.
- Died: February 3, 2018 (aged 65) Los Angeles, California, U.S.
- Genres: Funk; R&B; soul; latin rock; jazz; jazz fusion
- Occupations: Musician; composer
- Instruments: Drums; percussion
- Years active: 1965–2018
- Education: California State University, Dominguez Hills

Leon "Ndugu" Chancler (/ɪnˈduːɡuː ˈtʃænslər/ in-DOO-goo CHANSS-lər; July 1, 1952 – February 3, 2018) was an American R&B, funk, and jazz drummer. He was also a composer, producer, and university professor.

== Biography ==
=== Early life ===
Born in Shreveport, Louisiana, on July 1, 1952, Leon Chancler was the youngest of seven children from the union of Rosie Lee and Henry Nathaniel Chancler. In 1960, the family relocated to Los Angeles, California. Chancler began playing drums when he was thirteen years old. He would publicly reminisce about being asked to leave a classroom for continuously tapping on the desk, only to be later heard tapping on the poles in the hallway. His love for the drums took over while attending Gompers Junior High School and it became his lifelong ambition. He graduated from Locke High School, having been involved in playing there with Latin musician Willie Bobo and the Harold Johnson Sextet, and he later graduated from Cal State Dominguez Hills with a degree in music education.

=== Musical career ===
By the time he finished college, Chancler had already performed with jazz artists such as the Gerald Wilson Big Band, Herbie Hancock, and recorded with Miles Davis, Freddie Hubbard, and Bobby Hutcherson. He played drums on Santana's "Europa (Earth's Cry Heaven's Smile)" (1976), and Keni Burke's "Risin' to the Top" (1982). He formed his own group "Chocolate Jam Company" in 1979 and released second album include "Shadow Dancing" in 1980. Sticks Hooper left the Crusaders in 1983 and Ndugu supported the crusaders as drummer.

He recorded frequently as a sideman in R&B, jazz, and pop music, including the instantly recognizable drums on Michael Jackson's "Billie Jean". In 1982, he received a Grammy nomination for Best Rhythm & Blues song for co-writing "Let It Whip", made famous by the Dazz Band. Other musicians with whom Chancler worked during his career included George Benson, TC Carson, Stanley Clarke, the Crusaders, George Duke, John Lee Hooker, Hubert Laws, Thelonious Monk, Jean-Luc Ponty, Lionel Richie, Kenny Rogers, Patrice Rushen, Santana, Frank Sinatra, Donna Summer, the Temptations, Tina Turner, and Weather Report.

In 2006, he became an Adjunct Assistant Professor of Jazz Studies at the University of Southern California and taught at the Stanford Jazz Workshop in California for three weeks every summer. He was a member of the Percussive Arts Society (PAS) and was inducted into the PAS Hall of Fame in 2020.

== Personal life ==
Chancler was given the name "Ndugu" by Herbie Hancock during his time with Hancock's Mwandishi band. He was known as Leon (Ndugu) Chancler, or sometimes Ndugu Chancler. Ndugu is Swahili for “earth brother”, a family member or comrade.

Ndugu grew up active in his church and was mentored and influenced by many strong men that helped shape his life after the absence of his father at age 13. His older brother Londell was a major support and motivation to him. When his mother was diagnosed with diabetes, Ndugu cared for her until her death in 1994. Chancler had one child, his son Rashon Chafic Chancler, with Vicki Guess.

=== Death ===
Chancler died at his home in Los Angeles on February 3, 2018, of prostate cancer, at the age of 65. A song, "Home Light," written by Ernie Watts and Marc Seales, was dedicated to Chancler. It was the title track of a 2018 album by the Ernie Watts Quartet.

== Discography ==
=== Chocolate Jam Company ===
- Spread of the Future (Sony, 1979)
- Ndugu & The Chocolate Jam Company, Do I Make You Feel Better (Sony 1980)

=== As sideman ===
With David Axelrod

- Seriously Deep (Polydor, 1975)

With George Benson

- Love Remembers (Warner Bros., 1993)

With Bloodstone

- We Go a Long Way Back (T-Neck, 1982)
- Party (T-Neck, 1984)

With Dee Dee Bridgewater

- Just Family (Elektra Records, 1977)

With Oscar Brown

- Brother Where Are You (Atlantic Records, 1974)

With Peabo Bryson

- All My Love (Capitol, 1989)
- Missing You (Concord, 2007)

With Keni Burke

- You're the Best (RCA Records, 1981)
- Changes (RCA Records, 1982)

With Tia Carrere

- Dream (Reprise, 1993)

With Jean Carn

- Trust Me (Motown, 1982)

With Miles Davis

- Miles Davis at Newport 1955-1975: The Bootleg Series Vol. 4 (Columbia Legacy, 2015)

With DeBarge

- The DeBarges (Gordy, 1981)
- In a Special Way (Gordy, 1983)

With George Duke

- Faces in Reflection (MPS Records, 1974)
- Feel (MPS Records, 1974)
- The Aura Will Prevail (MPS Records, 1975)
- I Love the Blues, She Heard My Cry (MPS Records, 1975)
- Liberated Fantasies (MPS Records, 1976)
- From Me to You (Epic Records, 1977)
- Reach for It (Epic Records, 1977)
- Don't Let Go (Epic Records, 1978)

With Sheena Easton

- No Strings (MCA Records, 1993)

With The Emotions

- Come into Our World (Columbia, 1979)

With Fuse One

- Fuse One (CTI, 1980)
- Silk (CTI, 1981)

With Herbie Hancock

- Mwandishi (Warner Bros., 1971)
- Sunlight (Columbia, 1978)

With Eddie Harris

- Excursions (Atlantic, 1973)

With Hampton Hawes

- Universe (Prestige, 1972)
- Blues for Walls (Prestige, 1973)

With Tramaine Hawkins

- To a Higher Place (Columbia, 1994)

With Joe Henderson

- The Elements (Milestone, 1974)

With Jennifer Holliday

- The Song Is You (Shanachie, 2014)

With John Lee Hooker

- The Healer (Chameleon, 1989)

With Phyllis Hyman

- Can't We Fall in Love Again? (Arista, 1981)

With James Ingram

- It's Your Night (Qwest, 1983)

With Michael Jackson

- Thriller (Epic, 1982)
- Bad (Epic, 1987)

With Gladys Knight & the Pips

- Visions (Columbia Records, 1983)

With Patti LaBelle

- Tasty (Epic, 1978)

With Labelle

- Chameleon (Epic, 1976)

With Harold Land

- Damisi (Mainstream, 1972)
- Choma (Burn) (Mainstream, 1972)

With Azar Lawrence

- Bridge into the New Age (Prestige, 1974)

With Cheryl Lynn

- Start Over (Manhattan, 1987)

With Wendy Matthews

- The Witness Tree (rooArt, 1994)

With Letta Mbulu

- In the Music the Village Never Ends (Munjae, 1983)

With The O'Jays

- Identify Yourself (Philadelphia, 1979)
- The Year 2000 (TSOP, 1980)
- My Favorite Person (Philadelphia, 1982)

With Greg Phillinganes

- Significant Gains (Planet, 1981)

With Jean-Luc Ponty

- Upon the Wings of Music (Atlantic Records, 1975)

With Julian Priester

- Love, Love (ECM, 1973)

With Lionel Richie

- Lionel Richie (Motown Records, 1982)

With LeAnn Rimes

- What a Wonderful World (Curb, 2004)

With Minnie Riperton

- Minnie (Capitol, 1979)

With Robbie Robertson

- Storyville (Geffen, 1991)

With Kenny Rogers

- Christmas (Liberty Records, 1981)
- Love Will Turn You Around (Liberty Records, 1982)
- We've Got Tonight (Liberty Records, 1983)
- The Heart of the Matter (RCA Records, 1985)

With Patrice Rushen

- Prelusion (Prestige Records, 1974)
- Before the Dawn (Prestige Records, 1975)
- Pizzazz (Elektra Records, 1979)
- Posh (Elektra Records, 1980)
- Signature (Discovery, 1997)

With Santana

- Borboletta (Columbia, 1974)
- Amigos (Columbia, 1976)

With Lalo Schifrin

- No One Home (Tabu, 1979)

With Frank Sinatra

- L.A. Is My Lady (Qwest, 1984)

With The Spinners

- Grand Slam (Atlantic, 1982)

With Donna Summer

- Donna Summer (Geffen, 1982)

With The Temptations

- Reunion (Gordy, 1982)

With Tina Turner

- Private Dancer (Capitol, 1984)

With Weather Report

- Tale Spinnin' (Columbia, 1975)

With The Whispers

- More of the Night (Capitol, 1990)

With Stevie Woods

- Take Me to Your Heaven (Cotillon, 1981)
- The Woman in My Life (Cotillion, 1982)

With Syreeta Wright

- Syreeta (Tamla Records, 1980)
- The Spell (Tamla Records, 1983)

== Bibliography ==
- Chancler, Ndugu (2013). Pocket Change. Drumsong Music Company. ISBN 978-1483585789.
