= Straight from the Heart (Patrice Rushen album) =

Studio album by Patrice Rushen
- Released: April 14, 1982
- Recorded: October 1981 – February 1982
- Studios: Conway (Hollywood, California)
- Genres: Jazz-pop; post-disco; R&B
- Length: 39:54
- Label: Elektra
- Producers: Charles Mims Jr.; Patrice Rushen (also exec.)

Patrice Rushen chronology
| Posh (1980) | Straight from the Heart (1982) | Now (1984) |

Singles from Straight from the Heart
- 1. "Forget Me Nots" Released: April 2, 1982; 2. "Breakout!" Released: 1982; 3. "I Was Tired of Being Alone" Released: 1982

Straight from the Heart is the seventh studio album by American recording artist Patrice Rushen, released on April 14, 1982, by Elektra Records. It features her most recognizable song, "Forget Me Nots", the oft-sampled "Remind Me" and the popular instrumental workout "Number One". Straight from the Heart scored Rushen her first two nominations at the 1983 Grammy Awards for Best Female R&B Vocal Performance for "Forget Me Nots" and Best R&B Instrumental Performance for "Number One".

The album is Rushen's most successful album to date, peaking inside the top 20 of the Billboard 200 chart at number 14. The success of "Forget Me Nots" is considered the major contributor to the album's popularity at the time of its release.

== Critical reception ==
Professional ratings
Review scores
| Source | Rating |
|---|---|
| AllMusic | 4.5/5 stars |
| Pitchfork | 8.6/10 |

In contemporary reviews, The Village Voice music critic Robert Christgau gave Straight from the Heart a "C+" and said that he prefers side one's "dancy vamp" over the songwriting on side two by Rushen, whom he called a fashionable "ingenue". Mike Freedberg of The Boston Phoenix said that Rushen "packs only the simplest themes hung on the driest melodies and boniest progressions." In a retrospective review, AllMusic's Andy Kellman called it "an early-'80s jazz-pop-R&B synthesis as durable and pleasing as any other".

In 2018, Pitchfork ranked Straight From the Heart #194 on its list of the 200 Greatest Albums of the 1980s.

== Track listing ==
Side one
| No. | Title | Writer(s) | Length |
|---|---|---|---|
| 1. | "Forget Me Nots" | Patrice Rushen, Teri McFadden, Freddie Washington | 4:45 |
| 2. | "I Was Tired of Being Alone" | Angela Ehgiator, Rushen, Washington, Charles Mims Jr. | 3:52 |
| 3. | "All We Need" | Roy Galloway, Rushen | 5:54 |
| 4. | "Number One" (Instrumental) | Rushen | 4:59 |

Side two
| No. | Title | Writer(s) | Length |
|---|---|---|---|
| 5. | "Where There Is Love" | Lynn Davis, Rushen, Washington | 3:11 |
| 6. | "Breakout!" | Rushen, Brenda Russell | 4:07 |
| 7. | "If Only" | Mims Jr., Rushen, Syreeta Wright | 3:23 |
| 8. | "Remind Me" | Karen Evans, Rushen | 5:18 |
| 9. | "(She Will) Take You Down to Love" | Fay Hauser, Rushen | 4:24 |

CD bonus tracks
| No. | Title | Writer(s) | Length |
|---|---|---|---|
| 10. | "Forget Me Nots" (12" Version) | Rushen, McFadden, Washington | 7:17 |
| 11. | "Breakout!" (12" Version) | Rushen, Russell | 5:49 |
| 12. | "Number One" (Instrumental) (12" Version) | Rushen | 6:48 |
| 13. | "Forget Me Nots" (Single Version) | Rushen, McFadden, Washington | 4:10 |
| 14. | "Breakout!" (Single Version) | Rushen, Russell | 3:38 |

== Charts ==
| Chart (1982) | Peak position |
|---|---|
| US Billboard 200 | 14 |
| US Top R&B/Hip-Hop Albums (Billboard) | 4 |
| Australia (Kent Music Report) | 74 |
| United Kingdom (Official Charts Company) | 24 |

=== Year-end charts ===
| Chart (1982) | Position |
|---|---|
| US Billboard 200 | 97 |
| US Top R&B/Hip-Hop Albums (Billboard) | 23 |

== Personnel ==
- Patrice Rushen – lead and backing vocals, arrangements, electric piano (1, 3, 5, 7, 8), synthesizers (1, 5, 7, 8), acoustic piano (2), percussion (2, 3, 5, 8), horn arrangements (2), clavinet (3, 6), vocal arrangements (3), synthesizer arrangements (7), guitar (9)
- Charles Mims Jr. – electric piano (2), horn arrangements (2), backing vocals (6), acoustic piano (7), synthesizers (7), synthesizer arrangements (7)
- Paul Jackson Jr. – guitar (2, 3, 6), acoustic guitar (5)
- Wali Ali – electric guitar (5)
- Marlo Henderson – lead guitar (6)
- Freddie Washington – bass (1, 2, 3, 5, 6, 7)
- Melvin Webb – drums (1, 2)
- Tony St. James – drums (3, 7)
- James Gadson – drums (5, 8)
- Ollie E. Brown – drums (6)
- Ulysses Duprée – percussion (3)
- Paulinho da Costa – percussion (9)
- Gerald Albright – saxophone (1, 2)
- Clay Lawry – trombone (2), bass trombone (2)
- Ray Brown – trumpet (2)
- Roy Galloway – backing vocals (1, 2, 5, 7, 8, 9), lead vocals (3), vocal arrangement (3)
- Jeanette Hawes – backing vocals (2)
- Lynn Davis – backing vocals (3, 5–8)
- Karen Evans – backing vocals (3)
- Brenda Russell – backing vocals (6)

== Production ==
- Executive Producer – Patrice Rushen
- Produced by Patrice Rushen and Charles Mims Jr.
- Recorded by Peter Chaikin
- Additional Recording by Philip Moores
- Assistant Engineer – Greg Stout
- Remixing – F. Byron Clark (Tracks 1–5, 8 & 9); Phillip Moores (Tracks 6 & 7).
- Mastered by John Golden at K-Disc Mastering (Hollywood, CA).
- Copyist – Greg Modster
- Art Direction – Ron Coro
- Design – John Barr and Ron Coro
- Photography – Bobby Holland
