= Universe (Hampton Hawes album) =

Studio album by Hampton Hawes
- Released: 1972
- Recorded: June 1972; Los Angeles, California
- Genre: Jazz
- Length: 40:26
- Label: Prestige; PR 10046

Hampton Hawes chronology
A Little Copenhagen Night Music (1971)	Universe (1972)	Blues for Walls (1973)

Universe is an album by jazz keyboardist Hampton Hawes recorded for the Prestige label in 1972.

== Reception ==
Professional ratings
Review scores
Source	Rating
Allmusic	2/5 stars

Scott Yanow of Allmusic states, "In 1972, Hampton Hawes began to fully explore electric keyboards. Although his longtime fans were not happy with the temporary move, Hawes' music at the time was actually more creative than it was often rated... Hawes deserves credit for his willingness to take chances, and even if this album (consisting of seven moody originals) is not as significant as most of his boppish trio dates from the 1950s, it deserves to be reevaluated, for it is better than often thought".

== Track listing ==
All compositions by Hampton Hawes

1. "Little Bird" - 1:17
2. "Drums for Peace" - 8:57
3. "Love Is Better" - 2:41
4. "Josie Black" - 8:15
5. "Don't Pass Me By" - 6:53
6. "Universe" - 3:05
7. "J.B.'s Mind" - 9:18

== Personnel ==
- Hampton Hawes - piano, electric piano, organ, synthesizer
- Oscar Brashear - trumpet
- Harold Land - tenor saxophone
- Arthur Adams - guitar
- Chuck Rainey - electric bass
- Ndugu - drums
