= Anything but Ordinary =

Studio album by Patrice Rushen
- Released: November 1, 1994
- Genre: R&B; pop; jazz
- Length: 53:43
- Label: Sindrome
- Producer: Patrice Rushen; Charles Mims, Jr.

Patrice Rushen chronology
Watch Out (1986)	Anything but Ordinary (1994)	Haven't You Heard - The Best of Patrice Rushen (1996)

Professional ratings
Review scores
Source	Rating
AllMusic	3/5 stars
Cash Box	(favorable)

Anything but Ordinary is the eleventh album by R&B singer Patrice Rushen, released on November 1, 1994. After her contract with Elektra Records expired in 1986–87, Rushen moved to Arista Records and afterwards in 1993, Patrice signed with Disney's Hollywood Records. Anything but Ordinary was first and only album to be released under her contract. Hollywood Records wasn't satisfied with the album and shelved it. Sin-Drome Records bought rights to the album and reissued it with the single "My Heart, Your Heart". Some of the album's tracks received airplay on R&B and smooth jazz radio stations.

The album was not as successful as her previous works, but songs such as "My Heart, Your Heart," "I Do" (which included a tongue-in-cheek sample of Rushen's hit "Forget Me Nots"), and "Tell Me" made the album a favorite. Sheena Easton provides background vocals on "I Only Think of You".

== Track listing ==
No.	Title	Length
1.	"I Do" (Patrice Rushen, Freddie Washington)	6:25
2.	"Tell Me" (Rushen, Nigel Martinez)	4:45
3.	"What'cha Gonna Do?" (Teri Lynne Carrington)	5:35
4.	"I Only Think of You" (Rushen, Sheree Brown)	4:18
5.	"My Heart, Your Heart" (Rushen, Brown, Washington)	5:22
6.	"Anything but Ordinary" (Rushen, Roy Galloway, Gregory Moore)	5:59
7.	"Top of the Line" (Rushen, Galloway)	4:56
8.	"State of Mind" (Rushen, Washington)	5:43
9.	"Caravan" (Galloway, Michael McEvoy)	5:10
10.	"Be With You" (Martinez, Paul Williams)	5:31
