= Freddie Washington (bassist) =

American bassist

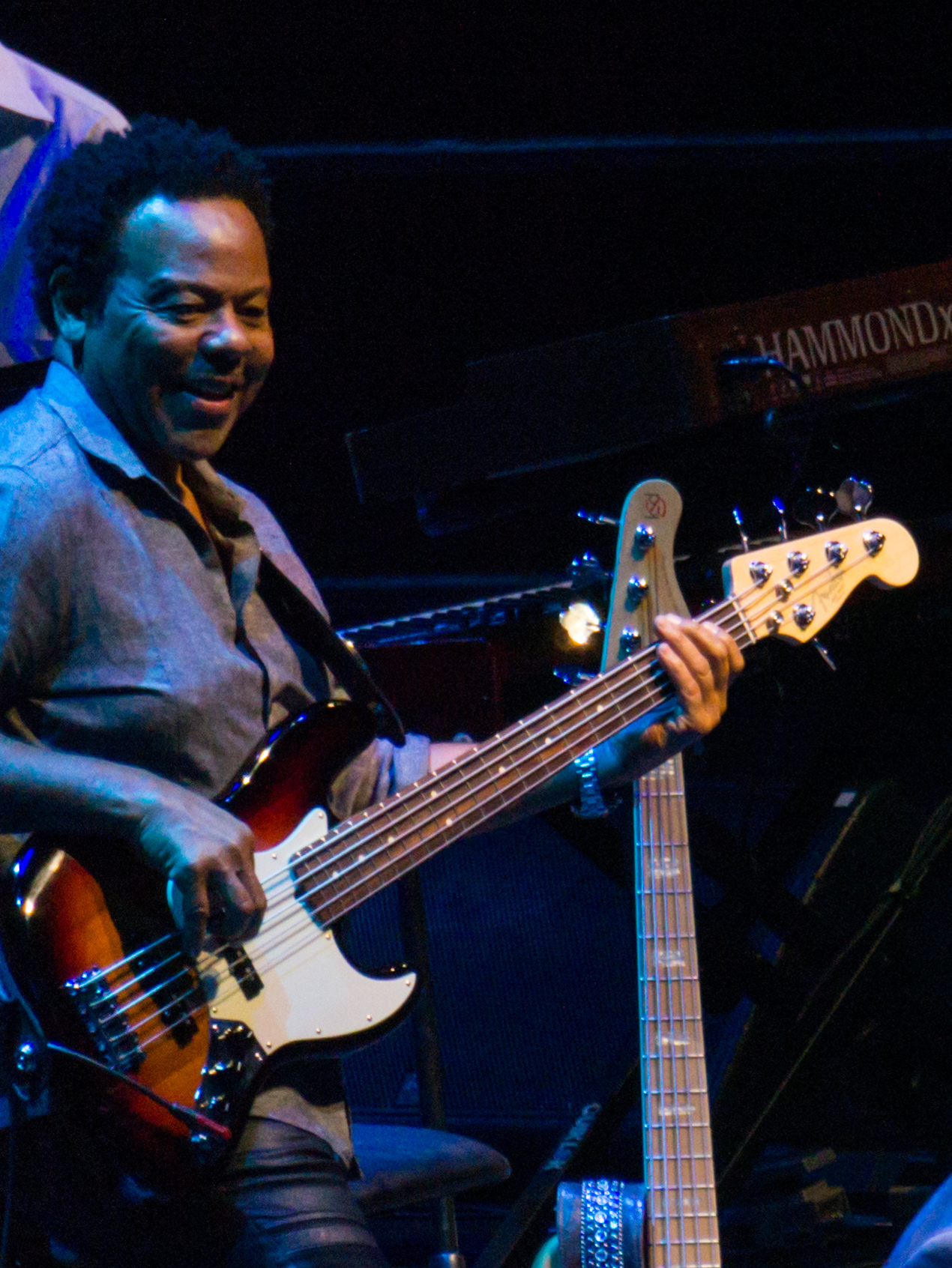
- Washington performing with Steely Dan in 2017.

Background information
- Born: Fred Washington; United States
- Genres: R&B; rock; pop; electronica; jazz
- Occupation: Bassist
- Instruments: Bass

"Ready" Freddie Washington is an American session bassist who has played with artists such as Herbie Hancock, Michael Jackson, Al Jarreau, Aaron Neville, Lionel Richie, Anita Baker, B.B. King, Elton John, Patrice Rushen, Stevie Wonder and Whitney Houston, Donald Fagen, The Crusaders, George Benson, Deniece Williams, Johnny Mathis, Burt Bacharach, Kenny Loggins, Celine Dion and Steely Dan.

He is best known for his songwriting contribution to "Forget Me Nots" by Patrice Rushen, which heavily features his bass work and was later sampled by Will Smith for "Men in Black". During the 1990s, Washington and Rushen were part of a popular rhythm section known as "The Meeting".

In 2005, Washington was a participant in Star Licks Productions’ All-Star Bass Series.

From 2006 to 2024, Washington was the touring bassist for Steely Dan.

== Early life ==
Freddie Washington is from Oakland, California. He was playing with Patrice Rushen and relocated to Los Angeles, living with her family for the first six months.

== Discography ==
=== As sideman ===
With Anita Baker

- Rapture (Elektra, 1986)

With DeBarge

- All This Love (Gordy, 1982)
- In a Special Way (Gordy, 1983)

With Patrice Rushen

- Patrice (Elektra, 1978)
- Pizzazz (Elektra, 1979)
- Posh (Elektra, 1980)
- Straight from the Heart (Elektra, 1982)
- Now (Elektra, 1984)
- Watch Out! (Arista, 1987)
- Signature (Discovery, 1997)

With others

- Gladys Knight & the Pips -- "Love Overboard" (1987)
- Boz Scaggs -- "Heart of Mine"

Solo Album

- "In the moment" (2015)
