= Before the Dawn (Patrice Rushen album) =

Studio album by Patrice Rushen
- Released: 1975
- Recorded: August 1975
- Studio: Fantasy (Berkeley, California)
- Genre: Jazz
- Length: 36:58
- Label: Prestige
- Producer: Reggie Andrews

Patrice Rushen chronology
Prelusion (1974)	Before the Dawn (1975)	Shout It Out (1977)

Professional ratings
Review scores
Source	Rating
AllMusic	4/5 stars
The Rolling Stone Jazz Record Guide	2/5 stars
Variety	(favourable)

Before the Dawn is the second album by jazz/R&B musician Patrice Rushen; while 1974's Prelusion was essentially a straight-ahead record with fusion references, 1975's Before the Dawn was essentially a fusion album. With this album, Rushen brings a fusion of R&B, pop, and rock elements to her jazz foundation.

The album included the song "What's the Story," which was the only song that did not have a jazz artist's sound; it had a more funk tune which featured singer Josie James. This would later be compared with songs from her follow-up albums as it showed great resemblance to her work as an R&B singer with Elektra Records. However, everything else on the album, is instrumental jazz — although instrumental jazz is mindful of R&B, pop, and rock. The album was a clear step for Rushen as it showed her entrance to R&B music and exit from jazz music.

Her next album was Shout It Out, her last with Prestige Records.

== Track listing ==
All tracks composed and arranged by Patrice Rushen.

1. "Kickin' Back" - 7:27
2. "What's the Story" – 5:15
3. "Jubilation" - 6:05
4. "Before the Dawn" - 8:30
5. "Razzia" - 9:41

== Personnel ==
- Patrice Rushen – acoustic piano, electric piano, clavinet, synthesizers, tambourine, cabasa
- Lee Ritenour – guitars
- Charles Meeks – bass (1, 2, 4, 5)
- Tony Dumas – bass (3)
- Leon "Ndugu" Chancler – drums (1, 2)
- Harvey Mason – drums (3, 4, 5)
- Nate Alfred – percussion (1, 2, 5)
- Kenneth Nash – percussion (3, 4)
- Hadley Caliman – tenor saxophone (1, 2)
- George Bohanon – trombone (1, 2, 4)
- Oscar Brashear – trumpet, flugelhorn (1, 2, 4)
- Hubert Laws – flute, alto flute (3, 4)
- Josie James – vocals (2)
- Nate Alfred, Reggie Andrews, Thelette Bennett, Josie James, Charles Meeks, Charles Mims, Patrice Rushen, Evelyn Wesley, Jimmie Lee Wesley, Brenda White and Martha Young – handclaps (2)

Production

- Reggie Andrews – producer, remixing
- Charles Mims – special production assistance
- Skip Shimmin – engineer, remixing
- Patrice Rushen – remixing
- David Turner – mastering
- Phil Carroll – art direction, design
- Phil Bray – photography
