= Aurora (Jean-Luc Ponty album) =

Studio album by Jean-Luc Ponty
- Released: February 26, 1976
- Recorded: December 1975
- Studios: Cherokee (Los Angeles, California)
- Genre: Jazz fusion
- Length: 37:28
- Label: Atlantic
- Producer: Jean-Luc Ponty

Jean-Luc Ponty chronology
Upon the Wings of Music (1975)	Aurora (1976)	Imaginary Voyage (1976)

Professional ratings
Review scores
Source	Rating
AllMusic	4/5 stars
The Rolling Stone Jazz Record Guide	3/5 stars

Aurora is a studio album by French jazz fusion artist Jean-Luc Ponty, released in 1976. It features guitarist Daryl Stuermer (later to join Genesis), keyboardist Patrice Rushen, bassist Tom Fowler (with whom Ponty had played with Frank Zappa), and drummer Norman Fearrington. It was reissued on audio cassette in 1990 and on CD in 1992.

== Track listing ==
All tracks written by Jean-Luc Ponty.

1. "Is Once Enough?" – 4:58
2. "Renaissance" – 5:48
3. "Aurora, Pt. 1" – 2:46
4. "Aurora, Pt. 2" – 6:15
5. "Passenger of the Dark" – 4:17
6. "Lost Forest" – 5:27
7. "Between You and Me" – 5:58
8. "Waking Dream" – 2:25

== Personnel ==
- Jean-Luc Ponty – acoustic & electric violin, violectra, autoharp, keyboards
- Daryl Stuermer – acoustic & electric guitars
- Patrice Rushen – acoustic & electric piano, synthesizer
- Tom Fowler – electric bass
- Norman Fearrington – drums, percussion

Production

- Jean-Luc Ponty – producer
- Larry Hirsch – engineer, mixing
- George Tutko – engineer, studio assistant
- Zal Schreiber – mastering
- Jim Marshall – photography
- Jean-Paul Oren – photography
- Phil A. Ceccola – cover photo

== Charts ==
Chart (1976)	Peak position
Billboard Jazz Albums	14
Billboard Pop Albums	123
