= Shout It Out (Patrice Rushen album) =

Studio album by Patrice Rushen
- Released: February 1977
- Recorded: 1976
- Genre: Jazz; jazz-funk
- Length: 41:04
- Label: Prestige
- Producer: Patrice Rushen; Reggie Andrews; Tommy Vicari

Patrice Rushen chronology
Before the Dawn (1975)	Shout It Out (1977)	Patrice (1978)

Shout It Out is the third album by singer Patrice Rushen. This album was the last Patrice released with Prestige Records before signing with Elektra Records. With this album, Rushen performs songs ranging from jazz, funk and fusion to R&B.

== Critical reception ==
Professional ratings
Review scores
Source	Rating
AllMusic	3/5 stars
The Rolling Stone Jazz Record Guide	3/5 stars

Craig Lytle of AllMusic said, "Barely into her twenties and, on this, her third album, Patrice Rushen's music spoke volumes for her talent and the growth she would endure as a music virtuoso. This album is not smeared with that dated sound of the '70s so many instrumental projects were contaminated with. Instead, Rushen gives her audience a pleasurable collection of songs ranging from jazz, funk, and fusion to R&B."

== Track listing ==
All tracks composed by Patrice Rushen, except where indicated.

1. "The Hump" (Darryl Cox, Patrice Rushen) – 6:04
2. "Shout It Out" – 6:14
3. "Stepping Stones" (Charles Mims) – 5:00
4. "Let Your Heart Be Free" (Angela Rushen, Patrice Rushen) – 3:58
5. "Roll with the Punches" – 6:17
6. "Let There Be Funk" (Darryl Cox, Patrice Rushen) – 4:16
7. "Yolon" (Reggie Andrews) – 4:32
8. "Sojourn" – 4:43

== Personnel ==
- Patrice Rushen – lead vocals (1–4, 6, 8), electric piano (1–5, 7, 8), clavinet (1, 2, 5, 6), handclaps (1, 4, 6), arrangements (1, 2, 4–8), tambourine (2, 5), Minimoog (3, 6, 7), electric bass (4), backing vocals (4), high bass (5), Yamaha electric grand piano (5, 8), ARP synthesizer (7) Bosendorfer grand piano (8), synth horns (8), synth strings (8), choir vocals (8)
- Mitchell Bagman – additional Minimoog (6)
- Larry Nash – synth horns (7, 8), synth strings (7, 8)
- Reggie Andrews – synth horns (7, 8), synth strings (7, 8), arrangements (7)
- Al McKay – guitars (1, 3, 4, 6, 7, 8)
- Charles Meeks – electric bass (1, 2, 3, 6, 7, 8), handclaps (1, 4, 6), backing vocals (1, 2, 3), thumbed bass (5), choir vocals (8)
- James Gadson – drums (1–7), "right" drums (8)
- Graham Lear – "left" drums (8)
- Bill Summers – percussion (2–8)
- Tom Scott – tenor saxophone (2), lyricon (2)
- Nate Alford – trumpet (1, 3, 5), handclaps (1, 4, 6)
- Charles Mims – trumpet (1, 3, 5), handclaps (1, 4), arrangements (3)
- Danny Vicari – trumpet (1, 3, 5), handclaps (1, 4)
- Tommy Vicari – whistle (6)
- Darrell Cox – handclaps (1, 4)
- Ferd Porche – handclaps (1, 4)
- Ronnie Williams – handclaps (1, 4)
- Roslyn Barbee – handclaps (1, 4)
- Josie James – backing vocals (1, 6), handclaps (1, 4, 6), choir vocals (8)
- Maxine Waters – backing vocals (2, 3), handclaps (6)
- Roy Galloway – backing vocals (2, 3, 6), handclaps (6), choir vocals (8), vocal solo (8)

Production

- Producers – Patrice Rushen, Reggie Andrews and Tommy Vicari.
- Executive Producer – Orrin Keepnews
- Production Assistance – Charles Mims
- Engineer – Tommy Vicari
- Assistant Engineers – Danny Vicari and Helen Silvani
- Mastered by Bernie Grundman at A&M Studios (Hollywood, CA).
- Art Direction and Design – Phil Carroll
- Photography – Phil Bray
