= Upon the Wings of Music =

Studio album by Jean-Luc Ponty
- Released: May 25, 1975
- Recorded: January 1975
- Studio: Paramount Studios (Hollywood, California)
- Genre: Jazz fusion
- Length: 36:38
- Label: Atlantic
- Producer: Jean-Luc Ponty

Jean-Luc Ponty chronology
Open Strings (1971)	Upon the Wings of Music (1975)	Aurora (1976)

Professional ratings
Review scores
Source	Rating
AllMusic	4.5/5 stars
The Rolling Stone Jazz Record Guide	4/5 stars

Upon the Wings of Music is an album by French jazz fusion artist Jean-Luc Ponty. It was released in 1975 on Atlantic, his first record for the company.

== Track listing ==
All songs written by Jean-Luc Ponty.

1. "Upon the Wings of Music" – 5:26
2. "Question with No Answer" – 3:29
3. "Now I Know" – 4:27
4. "Polyfolk Dance" – 5:12
5. "Waving Memories" – 5:43
6. "Echoes of the Future" – 3:09
7. "Bowing-Bowing" – 4:53
8. "Fight for Life" – 4:34

== Personnel ==
- Jean-Luc Ponty – electric violin, violectra, acoustic violins, strings synthesizer
- Ray Parker Jr. – electric rhythm guitar & guitar solos
- Dan Sawyer – electric rhythm guitar
- Patrice Rushen – acoustic & electric piano, Hohner clavinet, synthesizer, organ
- Ralphe Armstrong – electric bass guitar
- Leon "Ndugu" Chancler – drums, Remo rototoms, percussion

Production notes

- Larry Hirsch – engineer, mixing
- Kerry McNabb – mixing
- Christian Simonpietri – photo
- Abie Sussman – design
- Bob Defrin – art director
