= King Kong: Jean-Luc Ponty Plays the Music of Frank Zappa =

Studio album by Jean-Luc Ponty
- Released: May 25, 1970
- Recorded: October 6–7, 1969
- Studio: Whitney Studios (Glendale, California)
- Genre: Jazz fusion; avant-garde jazz
- Length: 43:42
- Label: World Pacific/Liberty
- Producer: Richard Bock

Jean-Luc Ponty chronology
Electric Connection (1969)	King Kong: Jean-Luc Ponty Plays the Music of Frank Zappa (1970)	Open Strings (1971)

King Kong: Jean-Luc Ponty Plays the Music of Frank Zappa (or simply King Kong) is an album by French jazz fusion artist Jean-Luc Ponty first released in May 1970 on Liberty Records' World Pacific Records subsidiary label and later released on Blue Note.

== Overview ==
The album contains selections Zappa had previously recorded either with the Mothers of Invention or under his own name, including:

- "King Kong", originally included on the Mothers' 1969 album Uncle Meat
- "Idiot Bastard Son", from the Mothers' 1968 album We're Only in It for the Money
- "Twenty Small Cigars", from Zappa's 1970 album Chunga's Revenge, released five months after this album
- "America Drinks and Goes Home", from the Mothers' 1967 album Absolutely Free

In addition, the track "Music for Electric Violin and Low Budget Orchestra" includes the themes from "Duke of Prunes" from Absolutely Free (1967), and "Pound for a Brown" from Uncle Meat (1969). Zappa excised those themes, and everything that followed them, when he later recorded the piece himself under the title "Revised Music for Guitar and Low-Budget Orchestra", which was first released on his 1978 album Studio Tan.

George Duke, who would shortly join Zappa in the Mothers, as did Ponty a few years later, is featured on electric piano on all tracks and acoustic piano on track 5. Ernie Watts is featured on alto and/or tenor saxophone on tracks 2–4 and 6. Zappa himself plays the guitar on track 4, and Mothers members Ian Underwood (tenor saxophone) and Art Tripp (drums) appear on track 1 and tracks 1, 5, and 6 respectively.

== Reception ==
Professional ratings
Review scores
Source	Rating
All About Jazz	4/5 stars
AllMusic	4/5 stars

Rolling Stone's Bob Palmer called it "one of the most rewarding and boundary-obliterating collaborations" and said "Zappa, donning his Jazz Composer - Arranger suit, emerges as a first-rate practitioner of the art: his previous lack of acceptance by the jazz community is probably due to the same bizarre touches that endear him to his younger audiences. Here he is reminiscent of Charles Mingus, not musically (except for the Mingus-like melody and violin-tenor voicing of "Twenty Small Cigars") but in the way he examines and finds new expressive possibilities in his earlier pieces, and combines them with new music that refers to wide areas of experience without centring in any one stylistic bag."

== Track listing ==
All songs written by Frank Zappa unless otherwise noted.

Side one

1. "King Kong" – 4:54
2. "Idiot Bastard Son" – 4:00
3. "Twenty Small Cigars" – 5:35
4. "How Would You Like to Have a Head Like That" (Jean-Luc Ponty) – 7:14

Side two

1. "Music for Electric Violin and Low-Budget Orchestra" – 19:20
2. "America Drinks and Goes Home" – 2:39

== Personnel ==
- Jean-Luc Ponty – electric violin (all tracks), baritone violectra (tracks: A1–A3, B2)
- Ernie Watts – alto saxophone (tracks A2, A3, B2); tenor saxophone (tracks A2–A4, B2)
- Ian Underwood – tenor saxophone (track A1), orchestra conductor (track B1)
- Frank Zappa – electric guitar (track A4)
- George Duke – electric piano (all tracks), acoustic piano (track B1)
- Gene Estes – vibraphone, percussion (tracks A1, B2)
- Buell Neidlinger – double bass (tracks A1, B1)
- Wilton Felder – Fender Precision electric bass (tracks A2, A3, A4, B2)
- John Guerin – drums (tracks A2, A3, A4, B2)
- Arthur Dyer Tripp III – drums (tracks A1, B1)
- Gene Cipriano – oboe, English horn (track B1)
- Donald Christlieb – bassoon (track B1)
- Vincent DeRosa – descant recorder, French horn, descant (track B1)
- Arthur Maebe – French horn, tuba (track B1)
- Jonathan Meyer – flute (track B1)
- Milton Thomas – viola (track B1)
- Harold Bemko – cello (track B1)

== Production notes ==
- Richard Bock – producer
- Dick Kunc – engineer
- Frank Zappa – arranger, composer, conductor
- Gerald Wilson – conductor
- Ian Underwood – conductor (track B1)
- Ron Wolin – art direction, design
- Leonard Feather – liner notes
