= Stevie Woods (musician) =

American musician (1951–2014)

- Born: Joseph Stephen Woods Jr. July 2, 1951; Chatham, Virginia, United States
- Died: January 28, 2014 (aged 62) Berlin, Germany
- Genres: R&B
- Occupation: Singer

Joseph Stephen "Stevie" Woods Jr. (July 2, 1951 – January 28, 2014) was an American R&B musician and singer.

== Biography ==
Woods was born in Chatham, Virginia, to jazz great Rusty Bryant. In the late 1970s, Woods was a member of the funk band Crowd Pleasers. In the early 1980s, his two singles, "Steal the Night" and "Just Can't Win 'Em All", reached top 40 on the Billboard Hot 100. After his brief U.S. fame fizzled, Woods relocated to Germany, where he successfully re-launched his career, releasing the single "Rock Me Baby" and starring in the musical Starlight Express. In 2010, all three of his early-1980s albums, which had been originally released by Cotillion Records, were re-issued on CD by Wounded Bird Records. The following year, he released the album Quiet Storm.

=== Personal life ===
Woods, a former Marine, graduated from Austin Community College.

In the 1970s and 1980s, Stevie was married to Hollywood actress/entrepreneur Cheri Woods (née Lewis). In 1985, they had a daughter, Tiana Woods, now an L.A.-based singer/songwriter and front woman for the band Varna. Cheri later chronicled their life together in her 2001 self-published book Death Row Madam: Exposing Sex and Drugs in the Entertainment Industry. According to it, Stevie Woods was a cousin of American actor Philip Michael Thomas.

== Death ==
Woods died of diabetes-related complications in Berlin, Germany, on January 28, 2014, at the age of 62.

== Discography ==
=== Albums ===
- Take Me to Your Heaven (Cotillion Records, 1981) U.S. #153, U.S. R&B #44
- The Woman in My Life (Cotillion, 1982)
- Attitude (Cotillion, 1983)

=== Singles ===
| Year | Title | Chart positions | | |
| Year | Title | Billboard Hot 100 | US R&B | US A/C |
|---|---|---|---|---|
| 1981 | "Steal the Night" | 25 | 36 | 14 |
| 1982 | "Just Can't Win 'Em All" | 38 | 57 | 15 |
| 1982 | "Fly Away" | 84 | — | 23 |
| 1982 | "Woman in My Life" | — | 42 | — |
| 1983 | "Ain't That Peculiar" | — | 54 | — |
