= Steal the Night (song) =

1981 single by Stevie Woods

Single by Stevie Woods

from the album Take Me to Your Heaven
- B-side: "Read Between the Lines"
- Released: 1981
- Genre: R&B, Soft rock
- Length: 3:47
- Label: Cotillion Records
- Songwriter(s): Bill Bowersock; Matt Vernon; Trevor Veitch
- Producer(s): Jack White

Stevie Woods singles chronology
"Steal the Night" (1981)	"Just Can't Win 'Em All" (1982)

"Steal the Night" is a song by Stevie Woods. It was released in 1981 as the first single from his album Take Me to Your Heaven.

The song is Woods' first top 40 and top 20 hit on the Billboard Hot 100 and Adult Contemporary charts, peaking at No. 25 and No. 14 respectively.

== Chart performance ==
Chart (1981)	Peak position
US Billboard Hot 100	25
US Billboard Hot Soul Singles	36
US Billboard Adult Contemporary	14
