= Prelusion =

Studio album by Patrice Rushen
- Released: 1974
- Recorded: 1973–1974
- Genre: Jazz
- Length: 44:32
- Label: Prestige
- Producer: Reggie Andrews

Patrice Rushen chronology
Prelusion (1974)	Before the Dawn (1975)

Prelusion is the debut album from jazz musician and later R&B recording artist Patrice Rushen. The first of three albums she would record with Prestige Records, the album was mainly instrumental jazz which was her main focus as an artist before focusing on popular R & B recordings four years later after signing with Elektra Records. Released in 1974, the album showed great promise for Rushen in the instrumental jazz genre with songs like "Haw-Right Now", "Shortie's Portion", and "Puttered Bopcorn".

The album only leaves people to speculate on where her career in jazz might have gone had she not switched to R&B singing in 1978. In 1998, Prelusion was reissued along with Rushen's second album, Before the Dawn, on a single 77-minute CD; unfortunately, "Puttered Bopcorn" was deleted due to space limitations.

== Critical reception ==
Professional ratings
Review scores
Source	Rating
AllMusic	4/5 stars
The Rolling Stone Jazz Record Guide	3/5 stars
Variety	(favourable)

Alex Henderson of AllMusic praised the album, writing: "When a 20-year-old Patrice Rushen recorded her debut album, Prelusion, in 1974, she was still four years away from becoming a full-time R&B singer. Instrumental jazz was her main focus, and there was every reason to believe that she would become a major figure in the jazz world. The L.A. native showed considerable promise on this entirely instrumental LP, which is best described as straight-ahead post-bop with fusion references." Leonard Feather of the Los Angeles Times called Prelusion "an album debut of exceptional promise."

== Track listing ==
All tracks composed and arranged by Patrice Rushen.

1. "Shortie's Portion" - 8:42
2. "7/73" - 12:42
3. "Haw Right Now" - 8:00
4. "Traverse" - 10:53
5. "Puttered Bopcorn" - 4:15

== Personnel ==
- Patrice Rushen – vocals, acoustic piano, electric piano, ARP synthesizer, clavinet
- Tony Dumas – electric bass, "blitz" bass
- Leon "Ndugu" Chancler – drums, rhythm arrangement (5)
- Kenneth Nash – percussion
- Joe Henderson – tenor saxophone
- Hadley Caliman – flute, alto flute, soprano saxophone
- Oscar Brashear – trumpet, flugelhorn
- George Bohanon – trombone

== Production ==
- Producer – Reggie Andrews
- Recording Engineers – Eddie Harris and Skip Shimmin
- Remixing – Skip Shimmin
- Art Direction and Design – Phil Carroll
- Photography – Bruce Talamon
- Liner Notes – Gerald Wilson
