= Take Me to Your Heaven (album) =

Studio album by Stevie Woods
- Released: 1981
- Recorded: 1981
- Studio: Rusk Sound Studios, Hollywood, California
- Genre: Soul, R&B
- Label: Cotillion
- Producer: Jack White

Stevie Woods chronology
Take Me to Your Heaven (1981)	The Woman in My Life (1982)

Singles from Take Me to Your Heaven
- 1. "Steal the Night" Released: 1981; 2. "Just Can't Win 'Em All" Released: 1982; 3. "Fly Away" Released: 1982

Take Me to Your Heaven is the debut album by Stevie Woods, released in 1981 on Cotillion Records. The album was reissued in 2010 by Wounded Bird Records.

The album is Woods' only album to chart on the Billboard 200 and Top Soul Albums charts. "Steal the Night" and "Just Can't Win 'Em All" are the album's (and Woods' only) Top 40 and Top 20 entries on the Billboard Hot 100 and Adult Contemporary charts respectively.

== Track listing ==
Side A
No.	Title	Writer(s)	Length
1.	"Fly Away"	Carol Bayer Sager, David Foster, Peter Allen	4:04
2.	"Just Can't Win 'Em All"	Bill Bowersock, Greg Mathieson, Matt Vernon, Trevor Veitch	4:10
3.	"Take Me to Your Heaven"	Kelly Wilson, Steve Wilson	4:03
4.	"Steal the Night"	Bill Bowersock, Matt Vernon, Trevor Veitch	3:47
5.	"Through the Years"	Steve Dorff, Marty Panzer	4:26

Side B
No.	Title	Writer(s)	Length
6.	"Wanna Be Close to You"	René Moore, Angela Winbush	4:38
7.	"Read Between the Lines"	Bill Bowersock, Greg Mathieson, Matt Vernon, Trevor Veitch	3:52
8.	"Throw a Little Bit of Love My Way"	David Foster, Harry Garfield, Jay Graydon	4:25
9.	"Gotcha"	David Shields, Fritz Baskett, Michael Thompson	5:00

== Personnel ==
Production

- Producer: Jack White
- Engineer: David Clark, Jürgen Koppers, Steven D. Smith

== Charts ==
Album

Year	Chart	Position
1981	Billboard 200	153
1981	Billboard Top Soul Albums	44

Singles

Year	Single	Chart	Position
1981	"Steal the Night"	U.S. Billboard Hot 100	25
1981	"Steal the Night"	U.S. Billboard Hot Soul Singles	36
1981	"Steal the Night"	U.S. Billboard Hot Adult Contemporary Tracks	14
1982	"Just Can't Win 'Em All"	U.S. Billboard Hot 100	38
1982	"Just Can't Win 'Em All"	U.S. Billboard Hot Soul Singles	57
1982	"Just Can't Win 'Em All"	U.S. Billboard Hot Adult Contemporary Tracks	15
1982	"Fly Away"	U.S. Billboard Hot 100	84
1982	"Fly Away"	U.S. Billboard Hot Adult Contemporary Tracks	23
