= Haven't You Heard (Patrice Rushen song) =

Single by Patrice Rushen

from the album Pizzazz
- B-side: "Keepin' Faith in Love"
- Released: October 2, 1979
- Recorded: 1979
- Genre: Pop; disco
- Label: Elektra Records
- Songwriter(s): Patrice Rushen; Charles Mims Jr.
- Producer(s): Patrice Rushen; Charles Mims Jr.; Reggie Andrews

Patrice Rushen singles chronology
| "Changes (In Your Life)" (1979) | "Haven't You Heard" (1979) | "Let the Music Take Me" (1980) |

"Haven't You Heard" is a song by American singer-songwriter Patrice Rushen, released in October 1979 as the first single from her fifth album, Pizzazz (1979). The song was both co-written and co-produced by Rushen, and became her first international hit in 1980. It reached number 42 on the US Billboard Hot 100, number five on the Billboard Disco Top 100 chart and number seven on the Billboard Hot Soul Singles chart. In the UK, the song peaked at number 62 on the UK Singles Chart.

== Legacy ==
In 2018, Pitchfork ranked "Haven't You Heard" number 199 in their list of "The 200 Best Songs of the 1970s", calling it "a formally perfect expression of disco. This kind of intimacy, personified by the whispery translucence of Rushen's voice, is just as easily exported to the dance floor." In 2020, Slant Magazine ranked the song number 45 in their list of "The 100 Best Dance Songs of All Time". In 2022, Rolling Stone ranked it number 99 in their "200 Greatest Dance Songs of All Time" list.

== Charts ==
| Chart (1980) | Peak position |
|---|---|
| UK Singles (OCC) | 62 |
| US Billboard Hot 100 | 42 |
| US Hot Soul Singles (Billboard) | 7 |
| US Disco Top 100 (Billboard) | 5 |
| US Cash Box Top 100 | 52 |
