= Forget Me Nots =

Single by Patrice Rushen

from the album Straight from the Heart
- B-side: "(She Will) Take You Down to Love" (US)
- Released: April 2, 1982
- Genre: R&B; post-disco; dance-funk
- Length: 4:05 (single version); 3:58 (UK edit); 4:10 (video version); 4:42 (album version); 7:11 (special dance mix)
- Label: Elektra
- Songwriters: Patrice Rushen; Freddie Washington; Terri McFaddin
- Producer: Patrice Rushen

Patrice Rushen singles chronology
"Never Gonna Give You Up" (1981)	"Forget Me Nots" (1982)	"Breakout!" (1982)

Music video
- "Forget Me Nots" on YouTube

"Forget Me Nots" is a song by American R&B musician Patrice Rushen, released in April 1982 by Elektra Records as the first single from her seventh album, Straight from the Heart (1982). The song is co-written by Rushen with Freddie Washington and Terri McFaddin, and was produced by Rushen. It received very little support from the record label, but became successful on the charts, peaking at No. 23 and 22 on the US Billboard Hot 100 and Cash Box Top 100, as well as No. 8 on the UK Singles Chart. It also earned Rushen her first nomination for Best Female R&B Vocal Performance at the 1983 Grammy Awards. Since its release, the song has been sampled and interpolated in several songs, including "Fastlove" by George Michael in 1996 and "Men in Black" by Will Smith in 1997.

== Background ==
The song was originally declared a flop by executives at Rushen's record label. It took three weeks of independent promotion to get the record in front of radio programmers and their audiences. She said in an interview with SoulMusic, "We believed in 'Forget Me Nots' so I took most of my life savings – which was not a lot – and [the track's producer] Charles Mims took some of his and we hired an independent promoter to take it and run with it. We had good reason to believe the record company might be wrong. I toured that year also and man, the record took off so fast, faster than ever before and faster than what we expected. 'Forget Me Nots' took off like wildfire."

The bassline is particularly recognizable, and was performed on the record by session bass player Freddie Washington. The tenor saxophone solo was played by Los Angeles session player and recording artist Gerald Albright, who also appears in the music video of the song.

The lyrics are from the point of view of one professing her longing for a rekindling with an ex-lover. In one part of the music video, the girlfriend of the ex turns her attention to another man. As the singer reunites with the ex, they vacate the premises, leaving the now-ex-girlfriend forlorn. She ruminates on the romance's end and sends the lover forget-me-nots, a flower that since medieval times has been given and worn to symbolize enduring love despite absence or separation.

== Critical reception ==
Brandon Ousley from Albumism wrote in his review of Straight from the Heart,

There's no better evidence of her refined style than on the album's seminal lead single, "Forget Me Nots". Co-written by Rushen, Freddie Washington, and Terri McFaddin, the propulsive dance-funk classic boasts layers of effervescent synthesizers and lively percussion, all anchored by scintillating handclaps, fingersnaps, and Washington's explosive bass work. After the song's irresistible drum-cum-bass break, noted jazz saxophonist Gerald Albright provides a steamy solo that ascends the infectious groove to new heights. A light, airy toned Rushen reminisces on a dissolved relationship between two lovers. With every emotion and desire she explores in her poised phrasing, she longs to rekindle their union by sending her lover 'forget me nots'—a flower that symbolizes enduring love—in hoping that he won't forget the love they once shared.

== Chart performance ==
The song peaked at No. 23 on the US Billboard Hot 100 as well as No. 22 on the Cash Box Top 100. It peaked at No. 4 on the Billboard Hot R&B chart and No. 2 on the Billboard Hot Dance chart.

Around the world, the song was also popular. It peaked at No. 19 on the Irish Singles Chart and No. 8 on the UK Singles Chart and in New Zealand.

== Impact and legacy ==
The single's success culminated in Rushen's scoring her first nomination for Best Female R&B Vocal Performance at the 1983 Grammy Awards. In October 2000, VH1 ranked "Forget Me Nots" No. 34 in their 100 Greatest Dance Songs special, and in 2009 the song was ranked No. 85 in their 100 Greatest One-Hit Wonders of the 1980s special. In 2019, NME ranked it among "The 20 Best Disco Songs of All Time". In 1988, it was featured prominently in Big, starring Tom Hanks. The song was also featured in the HBO film The Normal Heart (2014) and in the Netflix movie Fatal Affair (2020). In 2024, Forbes ranked it No. 4 in their list of "The 30 Greatest Disco Songs of All Time".

== Charts ==
Chart (1982–1983)	Peak position
Australia (Kent Music Report)	29
Ireland (IRMA)	19
Netherlands (Single Top 100)	24
New Zealand (RIANZ)	8
UK Singles (OCC)	8
US Billboard Hot 100	23
US Hot R&B/Hip-Hop Songs (Billboard)	4
US Hot Dance Club Play (Billboard)	2
US Cash Box Top 100	22

== Certifications ==
Region	Certification	Certified units/sales
United Kingdom (BPI)	Silver	200,000^{‡}
^{‡} Sales+streaming figures based on certification alone.

== Personnel ==
- Patrice Rushen – lead and backing vocals, arrangements, electric piano, synthesizers
- Roy Galloway – backing vocals
- Freddie Washington – bass
- Melvin Webb – drums
- Gerald Albright – saxophone

== Cover versions and sampling ==
The song has been covered directly by several artists.

- In 1991, electronic band Tongue 'n' Cheek recorded a dance version of "Forget Me Nots", which reached number 26 on the UK Singles Chart and number 17 on the UK Airplay Chart.
- In 1995, Eurodance/dance-pop duo La Bouche covered it on their debut album Sweet Dreams. It was included on their remix album All Mixed Up.
- In 2006, jazz guitarist Lee Ritenour collaborated with Patrice Rushen and South African singer Zamajobe on a cover version of the song for his album Smoke 'n Mirrors. Zamajobe sang the lead vocal, with Rushen on background vocals, Rhodes piano, and an organ solo. The version featured a brief African rhythm interlude.
- In 2021, jazz drummer Akira Jimbo released a version featuring Rushen on lead vocals and piano, and Freddie Washington on bass. This version was included on his solo album Sora.

The song has been sampled frequently, including:

- George Michael in "Fastlove" (1996), which interpolates the song near the end.
- It is also sampled by Will Smith's 1997 hit "Men in Black" from the soundtrack to the film of the same name.
- Australian satirist Simon Hunt, under the name Pauline Pantsdown, sampled the song for his 1997 track "Backdoor Man".

Weekly chart performance for "Forget Me Nots" (September & Poolse version)
Chart (2026)	Peak position
Lithuania Airplay (TopHit)	53
