= Oscar Brashear =

American jazz musician (1944–2023)

Oscar Brashear (August 18, 1944 – July 7, 2023) was an American jazz trumpeter and session musician from Chicago, Illinois.

After studying at DuSable High School and Wright Jr. College (currently known as Wilbur Wright College) under John DeRoule he worked briefly with Woody Herman before going on to join Count Basie in 1968–69, returning to freelance in Chicago with Sonny Stitt, Gene Ammons, Dexter Gordon and James Moody. Moving to Los Angeles in 1971, he worked with Gerald Wilson, Harold Land, Oliver Nelson, Shelly Manne, Quincy Jones (with whom he toured in Japan), Horace Silver and Duke Pearson.

Brashear recorded with Teddy Edwards, Jimmy Smith, Sonny Rollins, Benny Golson, Bobby Hutcherson, B. B. King, Bobby Bland, Freddie Hubbard, Joe Farrell, The Crusaders, McCoy Tyner, Gene Harris, Randy Newman, Frank Sinatra, Earth, Wind & Fire, Carole King, Benny Carter, Billy Higgins and Ry Cooder.

Brashear died on July 7, 2023, at the age of 78.

== Discography ==
With Nat Adderley

- Double Exposure (Prestige, 1975)

With Count Basie

- Manufacturers of Soul (Brunswick, 1968) with Jackie Wilson
- The Board of Directors Annual Report (Dot, 1968) with The Mills Brothers
- Basie Straight Ahead (Dot, 1968)
- How About This (Paramount, 1968) with Kay Starr
- Standing Ovation (Dot, 1969)
- Basic Basie (MPS, 1969)
- The Dedication Series, Vol. XI: Retrospective Sessions (Impulse!, 1969)

With Regina Belle

- Lazy Afternoon (Peak, 2004)

With Bobby Bland and B. B. King

- Bobby Bland and B. B. King Together Again...Live (MCA, 1976)

With Brass Fever

- Brass Fever (Impulse!, 1975)
- Time Is Running Out (Impulse!, 1976)

With Kenny Burrell

- Both Feet on the Ground (Fantasy, 1973)
- Heritage (AudioSource, 1980)

With Donald Byrd

- Caricatures (Blue Note, 1976)

With Ry Cooder

- Paradise and Lunch (Reprise, 1974)
- Chicken Skin Music (Reprise, 1976)
- Jazz (Reprise, 1978)

With The Crusaders

- Street Life (MCA, 1979)

With Miles Davis

- Dingo (Warner Bros., 1991)

With Neil Diamond

- Up on the Roof: Songs from the Brill Building (Columbia, 1993)

With Earth, Wind & Fire

- The Need of Love (Warner Bros, 1971)
- Last Days and Time (Columbia, 1972)
- Head to the Sky (Columbia, 1973)
- Spirit (Columbia, 1976)
- All 'n All (Columbia, 1977)
- I Am (Columbia, 1979)
- Raise! (Columbia, 1981)
- Powerlight (Columbia, 1983)
- Heritage (Columbia, 1990)

With Teddy Edwards

- Blue Saxophone (Verve/Gitanes, 1992 [1993])

With Joe Farrell

- Night Dancing (Warner Bros., 1978)

With Henry Franklin

- The Skipper (Black Jazz Records, 1972)
- The Skipper at Home (Black Jazz Records, 1974)

With Dizzy Gillespie

- Free Ride (Pablo, 1977) composed and arranged by Lalo Schifrin

With Benny Golson

- California Message (Baystate, 1981) with Curtis Fuller

With Eddie Harris

- Bad Luck Is All I Have (Atlantic, 1975)
- How Can You Live Like That? (Atlantic, 1976)

With Gene Harris

- Astral Signal (Blue Note, 1975)

With Donny Hathaway

- Everything Is Everything (Atco, 1970)

With Hampton Hawes

- Universe (Prestige, 1972)
- Blues for Walls (Prestige, 1973)

with Joe Henderson

- Canyon Lady (Milestone, 1973 [1975])
- Black Miracle (Milestone, 1976)

With Billy Higgins

- Billy Higgins Quintet (Sweet Basil, 1993)

With Richard "Groove" Holmes

- Six Million Dollar Man (RCA/Flying Dutchman, 1975)

With Paul Horn

- Dream Machine (Mushroom Records, 1978)

With Freddie Hubbard

- The Love Connection (Columbia, 1979)

With Bobby Hutcherson

- Head On (Blue Note, 1971)
- Inner Glow (Blue Note, 1975)
- Montara (Blue Note, 1975)
- Farewell Keystone (Theresa, 1982 [1988])

With Bobbi Humphrey

- Fancy Dancer (Blue Note, 1975)

With Paul Humphrey Sextet

- Paul Humphrey Sextet featuring Oscar Brashear (Discovery Records, 1981)

With Ahmad Jamal

- Night Song (Motown, 1980)

With Rick James

- Bustin' Out of L Seven (Gordy, 1979)

With J. J. Johnson

- Pinnacles (Milestone, 1980)

With Karma

- Celebration (Horizon/A&M, 1976)
- For Everybody (Horizon/A&M, 1977)

With Carole King

- Simple Things (Capitol, 1977)
- Welcome Home (Capitol, 1978)

With Harold Land

- Damisi (Mainstream, 1972)
- Xocia's Dance (Muse, 1981)

With Hubert Laws

- The San Francisco Concert (CTI, 1975)

With Ray Manzarek

- The Golden Scarab (Mercury, 1974)

With Carmen McRae

- Can't Hide Love (Blue Note, 1976)

With Blue Mitchell

- Stratosonic Nuances (RCA, 1975)

With Oliver Nelson

- Skull Session (Flying Dutchman, 1975)

With Willie Nelson

- Healing Hands of Time (Capitol, 1994)

With Randy Newman

- Bad Love (DreamWorks, 1999)

With Bonnie Raitt

- Takin' My Time (Warner Bros., 1973)

With Sonny Rollins

- The Way I Feel (Milestone, 1976)

With Patrice Rushen

- Prelusion (Prestige, 1974)
- Before the Dawn (Prestige, 1975)

With Joe Sample

- Did You Feel That? (Warner Records, 1994)

With Moacir Santos

- Maestro (Blue Note, 1973)
- Carnival of the Spirits (Blue Note 1975)

With Lalo Schifrin

- Gypsies (Tabu, 1978)

With Zoot Sims

- Hawthorne Nights (Pablo, 1977)
- Passion Flower: Zoot Sims Plays Duke Ellington (Pablo Today, 1980) with the Benny Carter Orchestra

With Horace Silver

- Silver 'n Brass (Blue Note, 1975)
- It's Got to Be Funky (Columbia, 1993)
- Pencil Packin' Papa (Columbia, 1994)

With Frank Sinatra

- L.A. Is My Lady (Qwest/Warner Bros. Records, 1984)

With Gábor Szabó

- Faces (Mercury, 1977)

With Stanley Turrentine

- Everybody Come On Out (Fantasy, 1976)

With James Taylor

- In The Pocket (Warner Bros., 1976)

With McCoy Tyner

- 13th House (Milestone, 1981)

With Was (Not Was)

- What Up, Dog? (Chrysalis, 1988)

With Gerald Wilson

- Jessica (Trend, 1983)
- Calafia (Trend, 1985)
- Jenna (Discovery, 1989)
- Theme for Monterey (MAMA, 1998)

With Valerie Carter

- Just a Stone's Throw Away (Columbia, 1977)
