= Karma (American band) =

American soul/funk/jazz band

- Also known as: Los Angeles, California, U.S.
- Genres: Rhythm and blues, Jazz Fusion
- Occupation: group
- Instruments: vocals, drums, keyboards, trumpet, saxophone
- Years active: 1974-1977
- Labels: Horizon, A&M
- Past members: Michael Greene; Curtis Robertson, Jr. Reggie Andrews; George Bohanon; Oscar Brashear; Ernie Watts; Josef "Joe" Blocker; Vander "Stars" Lockett

Karma was an American soul/funk/jazz band, which recorded two albums for the A&M Records imprint Horizon Records in the 1970s. Its members included Ernie Watts, trombonist George Bohanon, trumpeter Oscar Brashear, keyboardist Reggie Andrews, bassist Curtis Robertson Jr and drummer Joe Blocker.

After recording two albums, the group disbanded in 1978. Group members Reggie Andrews and George Bohanon became record producers - the former becoming successful in overseeing albums by Patrice Rushen and The Dazz Band. Ernie Watts would later tour with The Rolling Stones, while Vander "Stars" Lockett would appear on Donald Fagen's 1982 solo debut, The Nightfly.

Reggie Andrews died at the age of 74 on June 23, 2022.

== Discography ==
- Celebration (Horizon/A&M, 1976)
- For Everybody (Horizon/A&M, 1977)
