= Patrice Rushen =

American jazz pianist and R&B singer (born 1954)

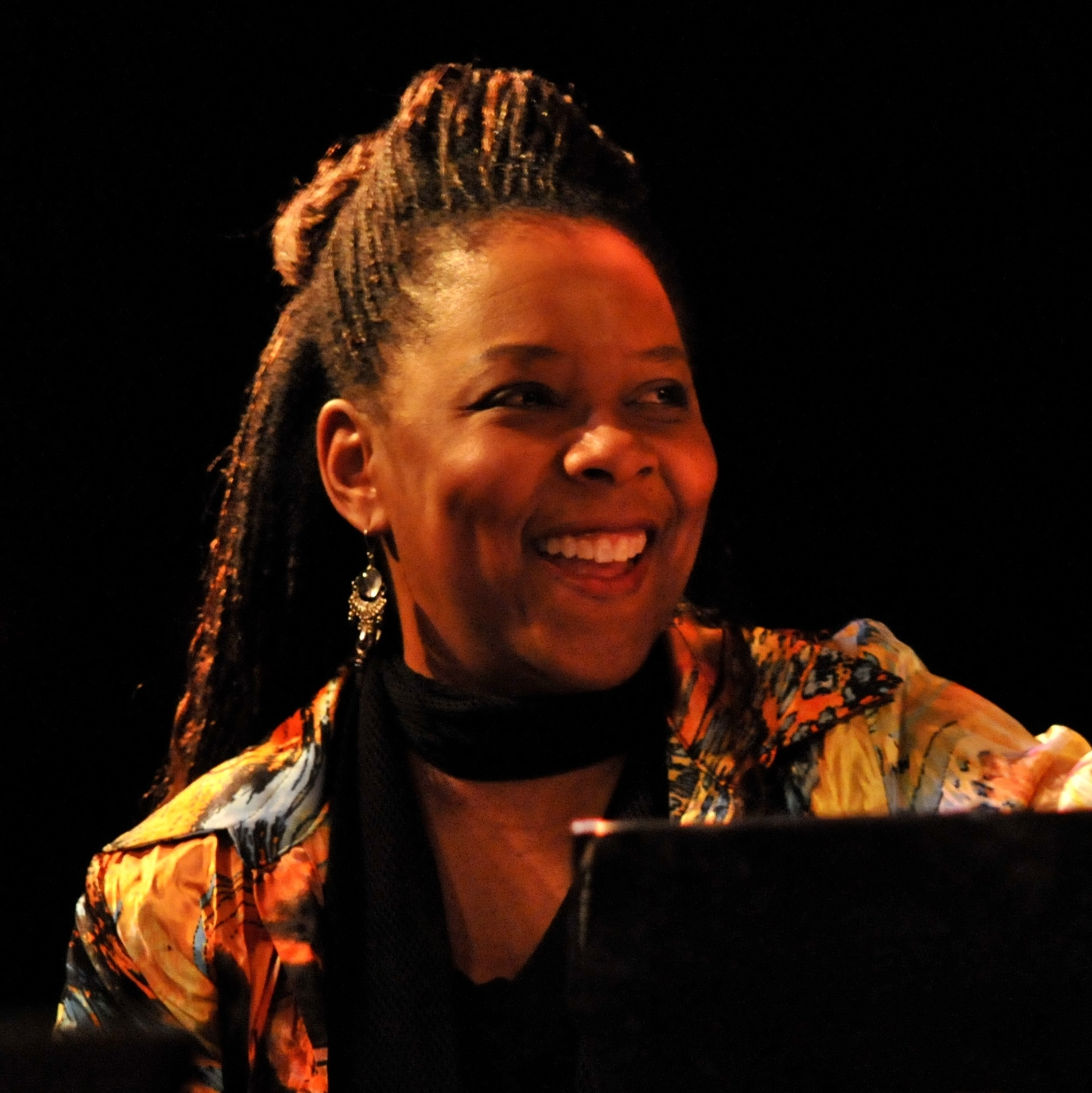
- Rushen performing in 2010

Background information
- Born: Patrice Louise Rushen; September 30, 1954 (age 71); Los Angeles, California, U.S.
- Genres: Soul; R&B; jazz-funk; post-disco; urban; soft rock; new wave; pop; dance
- Occupations: Singer; songwriter; pianist; record producer; music director; educator
- Instruments: Vocals; piano; keyboards; flute; clarinet; percussion
- Years active: 1963–present
- Labels: Prestige; Elektra; Arista; GRP; Aix; Discovery
- Formerly of: CAB
- Website: Official website

Patrice Louise Rushen (born September 30, 1954) is an American jazz pianist, R&B singer, record producer, multi-instrumentalist, songwriter, and music director.

At the 25th Annual Grammy Awards, her 1982 single, "Forget Me Nots", received a nomination for Best Female R&B Vocal Performance, while her instrumental song, "Number One" was nominated Best R&B Instrumental; both songs were from her seventh studio album, Straight from the Heart (1982).

Since 2008, Rushen has served as an ambassador for artistry in education at the Berklee College of Music, and the chair of the popular music program at the USC Thornton School of Music from 2014 to 2024.

== Biography ==
Rushen, who is of African American heritage, is the elder of two daughters born to Allen and Ruth Rushen (former Director of California Department of Corrections). Patrice was three years old when she began playing the piano, and by the time she was six, she was giving classical recitals. In her teens, she attended Locke High School and later earned a degree in music from the University of Southern California.

After winning a competition at the age of 17 that enabled her to perform with her band at the Monterey Jazz Festival, Rushen signed with the Prestige label, releasing three albums with them – Prelusion (1974), Before the Dawn (1975), and Shout It Out (1977). In 1978, when she was 23, she began recording with Elektra.

Rushen married Marc St. Louis, a concert tour manager and live show production specialist, in 1986. They have one son, Cameron and one daughter named Jadyn. The name of her publishing company, Baby fingers Inc., is pulled from her nickname Babyfingers for her tiny hands. In 2005, Rushen received an honorary doctorate of Music degree from Berklee College of Music. She served as chair of popular music at USC 2013-2023, and the ambassador of Artistry in Education at the Berklee College of Music. She has served as the film composer for numerous movies, television shows and documentaries. She has been a member of jazz fusion band CAB, The Meeting (GRP Records) with Ndugu Chancler, Alphonso Johnson and Ernie Watts. Rushen is also a music director, having worked on various television events as well as Janet Jackson's second concert tour Janet World Tour.

== Cultural impact ==
Rushen's songs are sampled often in other artists' music. The chorus from "Forget Me Nots" was used as the music for the 1997 song "Men in Black". Rushen was credited as writer and composer, along with Will Smith and Terri McFadden. The same chorus can be heard in George Michael's song "Fastlove". "Forget Me Nots" previously found its way into the trampolining scene in the 1988 film Big. Her song "Haven't You Heard" was sampled in Kirk Franklin's "Looking For You" from the Norbit soundtrack. In 2021, "Forget Me Nots" was used in a dance challenge on TikTok.

Rushen was the first woman to serve as music director for the 46th, 47th, and 48th Grammy Awards. She was the only woman music director/conductor/arranger for a late-night show titled The Midnight Hour, which aired on CBS in 1990. She is a classically trained pianist and composer: her Fanfare and Fantaisie has been recorded by the Wisconsin Chamber Orchestra, conducted by Andrew Sewell.

== Awards ==
=== Grammy awards ===
Rushen has received three Grammy nominations.

Year	Category	Nominated work	Result
1983	Best R&B Instrumental Performance	"Number One"	Nominated
1983	Best R&B Vocal Performance, Female	"Forget Me Nots"	Nominated
1998	Best Contemporary Jazz Performance	"Signature"	Nominated

=== Other awards ===
- Number One Record "Feels So Real", Radio & Records (R&R) National Chart - Writers: Patrice Rushen & Fred Washington, 1984
- ASCAP Songwriter's Award, 1988
- USC Black Student Assembly, Legacy of Excellence Award, 1992
- Crystal Award, American Women in Film, 1994
- ASCAP Award, Most Performed Song in Motion Pictures for 1997 for "Men in Black," 1998
- NAACP Image Award Nomination for Best Contemporary Jazz Recording for “Signature”, 1998
- Honorary Doctorate Berklee College of Music, 2005
- The California Jazz Foundation NICA award for lifetime achievement, 2019
- The Ramo Music Faculty Award, 2020
- Trailblazer Award, Salute Them Awards, 2021
- Hamilton Garrett Center for Music and Arts (Boston, MA), Make Them Hear You Award, 2023
- Black Music Honors Lifetime Achievement Awards,2023
- Roland Lifetime Achievement Award,2025
- LA Jazz Society Composer/Arranger Award,2025
- NEA Jazz Master, 2026

== Discography ==
=== Solo albums ===
Overview of Patrice Rushen studio albums
Year	Title	Chart positions					
Year	Title	US Pop	US R&B	US Jazz	US Tra. Jazz	AUS	UK
1974	Prelusion	—	—	—	—	—	—
1975	Before the Dawn	—	48	14	—	—	—
1977	Shout It Out	164	—	16	—	—	—
1978	Patrice	98	27	5	—	—	—
1979	Pizzazz	39	11	2	—	—	—
1980	Posh	71	23	—	—	—	—
1982	Straight from the Heart	14	4	—	—	74	24
1984	Now	40	7	—	7	—	73
1987	Watch Out!	77	19	—	—	—	—
1994	Anything but Ordinary	—	—	—	—	—	—
1997	Signature	—	—	11	—	—	—
2000	Jazz Straight Up	—	—	—	—	—	—
2006	Standards	—	—	—	—	—	—
"—" denotes the album failed to chart

=== Compilations and collections ===
Overview of Patrice Rushen compilations
Year	Title	Chart positions
Year	Title	US Jazz
1980	Let There Be Funk: The Best of Patrice Rushen	42
1985	Anthology of Patrice Rushen	—
1996	Forget Me Nots and Remind Me (Japan)	—
1996	Haven't You Heard – The Best of Patrice Rushen	—
2002	The Essentials: Patrice Rushen (US)	—
2003	Forget Me Nots & Other Hits (US)	—
2013	Patrice + Pizzazz + Posh (UK)	—
2013	Straight from the Heart + Now (UK)	—
2019	Remind Me (The Classic Elektra Recordings 1978–1984) (UK)	—
2022	Feels So Real (The Complete Elektra Recordings 1978–1984) (UK)	—
"—" denotes the album failed to chart

=== Singles ===
List of singles, with selected peak chart positions and certifications
Year	Title	Chart positions				Certifications
Year	Title	US Hot 100	US R&B	US Dance	UK	Certifications
1975	"Kickin' Back"	—	—	—	—	
1977	"Let Your Heart Be Free"	—	—	—	—	
1977	"The Hump"	—	—	—	—	
1978	"Changes in Your Life"	—	—	—	—	
1979	"Hang It Up"	—	16	—	—	
1979	"When I Found You"	—	87	—	—	
1980	"Givin' It Up Is Givin' Up"	—	—	—	—	
1980	"Haven't You Heard"	42	7	5	62	
1980	"Let the Music Take Me"	—	50	—	—	
1980	"Look Up"	102	13	2	—	
1980	"Don't Blame Me"	—	—	—	—	
1981	"Never Gonna Give You Up (Won't Let You Be)"	—	30	2	66	
1982	"Forget Me Nots"	23	4	2	8	BPI: Silver
1982	"Breakout!"	—	46	—	—	
1982	"I Was Tired of Being Alone"	—	79	—	39	
1982	"Number One"	—	—	—	—	
1984	"Get Off (You Fascinate Me)"	—	26	40	—	
1984	"Feels So Real (Won't Let Go)"	78	3	10	51	
1987	"Watch Out"	—	9	22	78	
1987	"Anything Can Happen"	—	51	—	—	
1987	"Come Back to Me"	—	65	37	—	
1994	"I Do"	—	—	—	—	
2004	"Forget Me Nots / Number One"	—	—	—	90	
"—" denotes the single failed to chart

=== Appearances ===
With Mike Clark

- Mike Clark (Blueprints of Jazz Vol1, 2008)

With CAB

- CAB 4 (Favored Nations, 2003)

With Carlos Santana and Wayne Shorter

- Live at the 1988 Montreux Jazz Festival (Liberation Entertainment, 2007)

With The Meeting

- The Meeting (GRP, 1990)
- Update (Hip-Bop, 1995)

With Kenny Burrell

- Heritage (AudioSource, 1980)

With Herbie Hancock

- Lite Me Up (Columbia, 1982)

With Eddie Henderson

- Heritage (Blue Note, 1976)
- Comin' Through (Capitol, 1977)

With Alphonso Johnson

- Yesterday's Dreams (Epic Records, 1976)

With Sadao Watanabe

- Autumn Blow (Inner City Records, 1977)

With Jean-Luc Ponty

- Upon the Wings of Music (Atlantic, 1975)
- Aurora (Atlantic, 1976)

With Letizia Gambi

- Introducing Letizia Gambi (Via Veneto Jazz, 2012)

With Wallace Roney

- A Place in Time (HighNote, 2016)

With Cindy Blackman

- Another Lifetime (4Q, 2010)

With Masayoshi Takanaka

- An Insatiable High (Kitty, 1977)

== Filmography ==
- American Fiction (2023)
- Agents of Change (2016)
- Burning Sands (2008)
- For One Night (2006, TV)
- Just a Dream (2002)
- Our America (2002, TV)
- Baby of the Family (2002)
- Piano, Bass and Drums (2002 Aix Entertainment, DVD Audio)
- The Killing Yard (2001, TV)
- Fire & Ice (2001, TV)
- Cora Unashamed (2000, TV)
- Ruby Bridges (1998, TV)
- America's Dream (1996, TV)
- A. Philip Randolph: For Jobs and Freedom (1996, TV)
- The Steve Harvey Show (1996) TV series (Main Theme & 122 episodes)
- The Midnight Hour (1990) TV series (unknown episodes)
- Without You I'm Nothing (1990)
- Hollywood Shuffle (1987)
- George Michael: I'm Your Man – A South Bank Show Special (2006, TV, writer: "Fastlove")
- Fahrenheit (2005, performer: "Hang It Up")
- Men in Black (1997, writer: "Men In Black")
- Waiting to Exhale (1995, performer: "And I Gave My Love to You")
- Big (1988, writer/performer: "Forget Me Nots")
- Dominick and Eugene (1988, performer: "Somewhere")
- TV in Black: The First Fifty Years (2004) Herself
- VH-1 Where Are They Now? Herself (One episode, 2002)
- 100 Greatest Dance Songs of Rock & Roll (2000), TV series, Herself
- Monterey Jazz Festival: 40 Legendary Years (1998), Herself
- The Best of Robert Townsend & His Partners in Crime (1991) Herself
- Top of the Pops, Herself (One episode, 1982)
- Soul Train, Herself (One episode, 1981)
- American Bandstand, Herself (One episode, 1980)

== Musical directing ==
=== Television awards and specials ===
- The 48th Annual Grammy Awards (2006, musical director)
- The 47th Annual Grammy Awards (2005, musical director)
- The 46th Annual Grammy Awards (2004, musical director)
- The 10th Annual Walk of Fame Honoring Smokey Robinson (2004, musical director)
- The 9th Annual Walk of Fame Honoring Aretha Franklin (2003, musical director)
- The 8th Annual Walk of Fame Honoring Stevie Wonder (2002, musical director)
- People's Choice Awards (1993, musical director)
- The Best of Robert Townsend & His Partners in Crime (1991, musical director)

=== Television series and miniseries ===
- The Midnight Hour (Note: For unknown episodes.) (1990)
- The Women of Brewster Place (1989, special musical consultant)
- Partners in Crime (1988, musical director)

=== Albums ===
- No Strings by Sheena Easton (1993, record producer)

== Sources ==
- Hogan, Ed. "Patrice Rushen". VH1. Archived from the original on October 22, 2002.
