= George Duke discography =

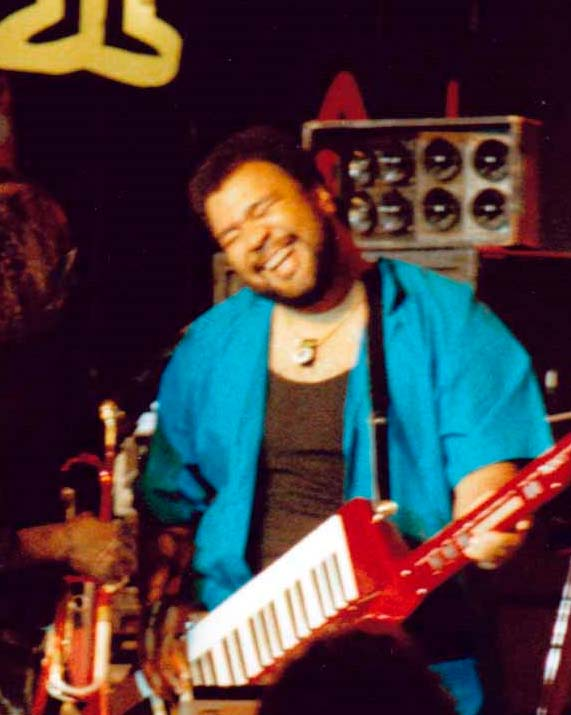
- Studio albums: 32
- Live albums: 8
- Singles: 47
- Collaboration: 19

American singer-songwriter, keyboardist and record producer George Duke released 32 studio albums, eight live albums, 19 collaborative albums (as a member of the George Duke Quartet, the George Duke Trio, the Cannonball Adderley Quintet, the Nat Adderley Sextet, The Mothers of Invention, the Billy Cobham/George Duke Band, the Clarke Duke Project, and the George Duke Band), and 47 singles.

Duke occasionally recorded under the name Dawilli Gonga, possibly for contractual reasons, when appearing on other artists albums.

== Albums ==
=== Studio albums ===
Title	Album details	Peak chart positions						Certifications
Title	Album details	US Pop	US R&B	US Jazz	US Con. Jazz	US Indie	UK	Certifications
Save the Country (Note: Rereleased as "Pacific Jazz" by United Artists in 1978 albeit with a different track listing.)	Released: 1970; Label: Liberty	—	—	—	—	—	—	
Solus (Note: Solus was recorded in April 1971 and intended to be released as a single album by SABA but when SABA folded and became MPS the powers that be decided to postpone its release. They finally put it out as a double album in 1976 together with George's MPS debut The Inner Source. The latter was recorded in October 1971.)	Released: 1971; Label: MPS/SABA	—	—	—	—	—	—	
The Inner Source	Released: 1973; Label: MPS/BASF	—	—	—	—	—	—	
Faces in Reflection	Released: 1974; Label: MPS/BASF	—	—	—	—	—	—	
Feel	Released: October 28, 1974; Label: MPS/BASF	141	—	—	—	—	—	
The Aura Will Prevail	Released: 1975; Label: MPS/BASF	111	—	—	—	—	—	
I Love the Blues, She Heard My Cry	Released: 1975; Label: MPS/BASF	169	36	—	—	—	—	
Liberated Fantasies	Released: 1976; Label: MPS/BASF	190	—	—	—	—	—	
The Dream (The 1976 Solo Keyboard Album) (Note: Recorded in 1976 and released in 1978 (Europe-only). Released in the USA (in a slightly different version) as The 1976 Solo Keyboard Album by Epic/CBS in 1982.)	Released: 1978, 1982 (US); Label: MPS, Epic	—	—	—	—	—	—	
From Me to You	Released: 1977; Label: Epic, CBS	192	—	—	—	—	—	
Reach for It	Released: 1977; Label: Epic, CBS	25	4	—	—	—	—	RIAA: Gold
Don't Let Go	Released: 1978; Label: Epic, CBS	39	5	—	—	—	—	
Follow the Rainbow	Released: 1979; Label: Epic, CBS	56	17	—	—	—	—	
Master of the Game	Released: 1979; Label: Epic, CBS	125	18	—	—	—	—	
A Brazilian Love Affair	Released: 1980; Label: Epic, CBS	119	40	—	—	—	33	
Dream On	Released: 1982; Label: Epic, CBS	48	17	—	—	—	—	
Guardian of the Light	Released: 1983; Label: Epic, CBS	147	46	—	—	—	—	
Rendezvous	Released: 1984; Label: Epic, CBS	—	—	—	—	—	—	
Thief in the Night	Released: 1985; Label: Elektra	183	52	—	—	—	—	
George Duke	Released: 1986; Label: Elektra	—	56	—	—	—	—	
Night After Night	Released: 1989; Label: Elektra	—	87	—	11	—	—	
Snapshot	Released: September 25, 1992; Label: Warner Bros.	—	36	50	1	—	—	
Illusions	Released: 1995; Label: Warner Bros.	—	33	3	3	—	—	
Is Love Enough?	Released: 1997; Label: Warner Bros.	—	65	4	2	—	—	
After Hours	Released: September 22, 1998; Label: Warner Bros.	—	—	8	7	—	—	
Cool	Released: September 19, 2000; Label: Warner Bros.	—	—	11	10	—	—	
Face the Music	Released: September 3, 2002; Label: Big Piano Music	—	—	7	—	24	—	
Duke	Released: March 29, 2005; Label: Big Piano Music	—	76	6	3	46	—	
In a Mellow Tone	Released: June 27, 2006; Label: Big Piano Music	—	—	9	—	41	—	
Dukey Treats	Released: August 26, 2008; Label: Big Piano Music, Heads Up	192	—	3	1	29	—	
Deja Vu	Released: August 10, 2010; Label: Big Piano Music, Heads Up	—	—	9	7	—	—	
DreamWeaver	Released: July 16, 2013; Label: Big Piano Music, Heads Up	74	—	2	1	—	—	
"—" denotes releases that did not chart or were not released in that territory.

=== Collaboration albums ===
Title	Album details
Jean-Luc Ponty Experience with the George Duke Trio (Note: Also a live recorded album.) (with Jean-Luc Ponty)	Released: 1969; Label: Pacific Jazz
Here and Now (with The Third Wave, Duke arranger and conductor)	Released: 1970; Label: MPS
Live on Tour in Europe (with Billy Cobham)	Released: 1976; Label: Atlantic
The Clarke/Duke Project (with Stanley Clarke)	Released: 1981; Label: Epic, Columbia
Gordon's Gotham (with Dexter Gordon)	Released : 1981; Label: Everest, Archive of Folk & Jazz Music - FS360
The Clarke/Duke Project II (with Stanley Clarke)	Released: 1983; Label: Epic, Columbia
3 (with Stanley Clarke)	Released: 1990; Label: Epic, Columbia

=== Compilation albums ===
Title	Album details
The Essential George Duke	Released: 2004; Label: Legacy

=== Live albums ===
Title	Year	Label
The Jean-Luc Ponty Experience with the George Duke Trio	1969	Pacific Jazz
Live on Tour in Europe with Billy Cobham	1976	Atlantic
Muir Woods Suite	1996	Warner Bros.

== Singles ==
Title	Year	Peak chart positions						Album
Title	Year	US	US R&B	US A R&B	US Dance	US Jazz	UK	Album
"Fools"	1975	—	—	—	—	—	—	The Aura Will Prevail
"'Scuse Me Miss"	1977	—	—	—	—	—	—	From Me to You
"Sing It"	1977	—	—	—	—	—	—	From Me to You
"You and Me"	1977	—	—	—	—	—	—	From Me to You
"Reach for It" (Note: Reached #42 in Canada.title=RPM Top 100 Singles - February 11, 1978)	1977	54	2	—	—	—	—	Reach for It
"Dukey Stick"	1978	—	4	—	—	—	—	Don't Let Go
"Movin' On"	1978	—	68	—	—	—	—	Don't Let Go
"The Way I Feel"	1978	—	—	—	—	—	—	Don't Let Go
"I Want You for Myself" (with Lynn Davis)	1979	—	23	—	23	—	—	Master of the Game
"Every Little Step I Take"	1979	—	—	—	—	—	—	Master of the Game
"Games"	1979	—	—	—	—	—	—	Master of the Game
"Party Down"	1979	—	—	—	—	—	—	Follow the Rainbow
"I Am for Real (May the Funk Be with You)"	1979	—	—	—	—	—	—	Follow the Rainbow
"Say That You Will"	1979	—	25	—	—	—	—	Follow the Rainbow
"Pluck"	1980	—	—	—	—	—	—	Follow the Rainbow
"Brazilian Love Affair"	1980	—	—	—	—	—	36	A Brazilian Love Affair
"Summer Breezin'"	1980	—	—	—	—	—	—	A Brazilian Love Affair
"Sweet Baby" (with Stanley Clarke)	1981	19	6	—	—	—	—	The Clarke/Duke Project
"I Just Want to Love You" (with Stanley Clarke)	1981	—	49	—	—	—	—	The Clarke/Duke Project
"Finding My Way" (with Stanley Clarke)	1981	—	—	—	—	—	—	The Clarke/Duke Project
"Shine On"	1982	41	15	—	36	—	—	Dream On
"Ride on Love"	1982	—	83	—	—	—	—	Dream On
"I Will Always Be Your Friend"	1982	—	—	—	—	—	—	Dream On
"Dream On"	1982	—	—	—	—	—	—	Dream On
"Reach Out"	1983	—	59	—	—	—	—	Guardian of the Light
"You're the One"	1983	—	—	—	—	—	—	Guardian of the Light
"Celebrate"	1983	—	—	—	—	—	—	Guardian of the Light
"Born to Love You"	1983	—	—	—	—	—	—	Guardian of the Light
"Heroes"	1983	—	37	—	—	—	—	The Clarke/Duke Project 2
"Secret Rendezvous"	1984	—	—	—	—	—	—	Rendezvous
"Thief in the Night" (featuring Lynn Davis)	1985	—	37	—	21	—	89	Thief in the Night
"I Surrender"	1985	—	—	—	—	—	—	Thief in the Night
"Love Mission"	1985	—	—	—	—	—	—	Thief in the Night
"Broken Glass"	1986	—	57	—	—	—	—	George Duke
"Good Friend"	1986	—	60	—	—	—	—	George Duke
"Guilty"	1989	—	—	—	—	—	—	Night After Night
"Love Ballad"	1989	—	—	—	—	—	—	Night After Night
"Lady"	1990	—	67	—	—	—	—	The Clarke/Duke Project 3
"No Rhyme, No Reason"	1992	—	30	—	—	—	—	Snapshot
"6 O'Clock"	1992	—	—	—	—	—	—	Snapshot
"Fame" (featuring Chante Moore, Deniece Williams, Howard Hewett, Jeffrey Osborne, Keith Washington, Lori Perry, Phil Perry, Philip Bailey, Rachelle Ferrell and Jim Gilstrap)	1992	—	—	—	—	—	—	Snapshot
"Love Can Be So Cold"	1995	—	78	24	—	—	—	Illusions
"Life and Times"	1995	—	—	—	—	—	—	Illusions
"Is Love Enough?"	1997	—	—	—	—	—	—	Is Love Enough?
"T-Jam"	2005	—	—	—	—	—	—	Duke
"The Total Experience" (Boney James featuring George Duke)	2006	—	—	—	—	1	—	Shine
"What Goes Around Comes Around"	2010	—	—	—	—	26	—	Déjà Vu
"You Never Know"	2013	—	—	—	—	14	—	Dreamweaver
"Bring Me Joy" (Al Jarreau featuring George Duke and Boney James)	2014	—	—	—	—	5	—	—
"—" denotes releases that did not chart or were not released in that territory.

== DVDs ==
Title	Details
Live in Tokyo Japan 1983	Released: February 17, 2004; Label: George Duke Enterprises
Live at Montreux 1997	Released: 2007; Label: Eagle Vision
