= No Rhyme, No Reason =

Single by George Duke

from the album Snapshot
- Released: August 25, 1992
- Genre: Jazz
- Label: Warner Bros.
- Songwriter: George Duke
- Producer: George Duke

George Duke singles chronology
"Lady" (1990)	"No Rhyme, No Reason" (1992)	"6 O'Clock" (1992)

"No Rhyme, No Reason" is a song by American musician George Duke, released as a single in 1992 by Warner Bros. Records. The song reached No. 30 on the US Billboard Hot R&B Singles chart.

== Overview ==
"No Rhyme, No Reason" was composed and produced by George Duke. The song appears on Duke's 1992 studio album Snapshot.

== Critical reception ==
Cashbox called the song "a bumpin' ballad featuring vocals by Duke and Phil Perry."

== Charts ==
Chart (1992)	Peak position
US Hot R&B Singles (Billboard)	30

== Personnel ==
- George Duke – Roland D-550, Synclavier, Ensoniq VFX, Korg M1, PPG Wave, acoustic piano, Minimoog bass, lead vocals, backing vocals
- Ray Fuller – guitars
- Jim Gilstrap, Rachelle Ferrell – backing vocals
