= Raymond Kelley =

American cellist and record producer (1938–2025)

- Born: February 26, 1938
- Died: March 4, 2025 (aged 87)
- Genres: Contemporary classical music; jazz
- Occupations: Cellist; record producer
- Years active: 1956–2025
- Labels: Resort Music, Inc.
- Website: resortmusic.com

Raymond "Ray" Kelley (February 26, 1938 – March 4, 2025) was an American cellist and record producer. He was one of the cellists on The Simpsons: Testify and Family Guy: Live in Vegas, and Grammy Award winning Jonathan Livingston Seagull soundtrack album.

Since 1956, he performed classical music for one season with the Salt Lake Symphony, then six years in the Dallas Symphony Orchestra, then five years with the Los Angeles Philharmonic orchestra until 1968. Kelley was part of a Hollywood session musician group named the Abnuceals Emuukha Electric Symphony Orchestra from 1965 to 1974. He has played cello on many major recording artists' albums over the years. His work as a cellist included performances with orchestras as well as contributions to studio recordings.

In 1988, he founded his own record label, Resort Music, Inc. He died on March 4, 2025, aged 87.

== Discography ==
- 1990 – Oasis
- 1991 – Destinations
- 1993 – From the Heart
- 1995 – Windy City
- 1997 – A Strand of Desert Pearls
- 1999 – Sound On Wisconsin

Featured on

- 1966 – Freak Out!, The Mothers of Invention
- 1968 – The Birds, The Bees & The Monkees, The Monkees
- 1972 – Hot August Night, Neil Diamond
- 1974 – Here Comes Inspiration, Paul Williams
- 1977 – From Me to You, George Duke
- 1980 – Faces, Earth, Wind & Fire
- 1983 – The Clarke/Duke Project II, Stanley Clarke
- 1994 – Muzak Sixtieth Anniversary, instrumental cover of Riders on the Storm
