= Life & Times (Billy Cobham album) =

Studio album by Billy Cobham
- Released: 1976
- Genre: Jazz, jazz rock
- Label: Atlantic
- Producer: Billy Cobham

Billy Cobham chronology
A Funky Thide of Sings (1975)	Life & Times (1976)	Live on Tour in Europe (1976)

Life & Times is an album by the American musician Billy Cobham, released in 1976. It peaked at No. 128 on the Billboard 200. Cobham supported the album by appearing at the Montreux Jazz Festival.

== Production ==
Cobham was backed by Doug Rauch on bass, John Scofield on guitar, and Dawilli Gonga on keyboards. Aside from "Earthlings", which was written by Scofield, Cobham composed all of the songs. "Siesta", on which viola and cello were used, was arranged by Arif Mardin.

== Critical reception ==
Professional ratings
Review scores
Source	Rating
AllMusic	3.5/5 stars
Omaha World-Herald	4/5 stars
The Penguin Guide to Jazz on CD, LP & Cassette	2/4 stars
The Rolling Stone Jazz Record Guide	2/5 stars
The Virgin Encyclopedia of Popular Music	2/5 stars

The Tampa Times noted that "Scofield's guitar work is at times reminiscent of Mahavishnu Orchestra's John McLaughlin". The Ann Arbor News said that the album shows that Cobham "can compose and arrange as well as lead and play the drums and synthesizer". The News & Observer praised the album's "vivid contrast—serene settings to strictly danceables."

The Omaha World-Herald said that the songs range from "superfunk to [a] Mahavishnu sound". The Arizona Republic opined that "the rhythmic themes [are] as important to compositions as the melodic leads". The Cincinnati Enquirer said that "Cobham's attacks are explosive... His playing is constantly up front".

The Penguin Guide to Jazz on CD, LP & Cassette ironically labeled Life & Times "a small masterpiece of miscasting."

== Track listing ==
Side one

1. "Life & Times"
2. "29"
  - a. Siesta
  - b. Wake Up!!!!!! That's What You Said
3. "East Bay"

Side two

1. "Earthlings"
2. "Song for a Friend (Part I)"
3. "On a Natural High"
4. "Song for a Friend (Part II)"
