= Individuality (Can I Be Me?) =

2000 album by Rachelle Ferrell

Studio album by Rachelle Ferrell
- Released: August 15, 2000
- Recorded: 1999–2000
- Studio: Le Gonks West (Los Angeles, CA); Andora Studios (Los Angeles, CA); The Blue Room (Philadelphia, PA); O'Henry Sound Studios (Burbank, CA)
- Genre: Contemporary jazz; soul
- Length: 59:47
- Label: Capitol
- Producer: Rachelle Ferrell (also exec.); George Duke; Jef Lee Johnson

Rachelle Ferrell chronology
Rachelle Ferrell (1992)	Individuality (Can I Be Me?) (2000)	Live In Montreux 91-97 (2002)

Singles from Individuality (Can I Be Me?)
- 1. "Satisfied" Released: 2000; 2. "I Forgive You" Released: 2001

Professional ratings
Review scores
Source	Rating
AllMusic	3/5 stars
Virgin Encyclopedia of Jazz	4/5 stars
USA Today	3/5 stars
Atlanta Journal Constitution	(B−)

Individuality (Can I Be Me?) is the third studio album by American vocalist Rachelle Ferrell, released on August 15, 2000, through Capitol Records. The album peaked at No. 1 on the US Billboard Jazz Albums chart and No. 16 on the Billboard Top R&B/Hip-Hop Albums chart.

== Background ==
Produced by Ferrell, George Duke and Jef Lee Johnson, this album was recorded at Le Gonks West and Andora Recording Studio in Los Angeles. Along with The Blue Room in Philadelphia, and O'Henry Sound Studios in Burbank. Artists such as Jonathan Butler made guest appearances.

=== Promotion ===
Ferrell appeared in an episode of Emeril Live, performing songs from the album.

== Critical reception ==
Steve Jones of USA Today declared, "During the eight years Ferrell has been away from recording (which she spent extricating herself from a production deal), the earthy pianist/singer has continued to electrify audiences with stunning performances. Instead of stagnating, she has grown as an artist while maintaining her creative integrity and remaining as hard to pigeonhole as ever. The title track speaks not only to her contractual liberation, but to her determination to explore every emotional nook and cranny of her material. Using her remarkable vocal range, she embarks on a deeply personal journey."

Michael Gallucci of Allmusic favourably found, "Ferrell's rich, textured voice strokes these often-formulaic songs along. Dipping into modern pop, R&B, gospel, and jazz, Ferrell paints some splendid portraits here (even if she does tend to over-sing her lines occasionally). A breakthrough album from a behind-the-scenes artist deserving more."

Sonia Murray of the Atlanta Journal Constitution gave a B− rating saying, "Eight years have passed since the woman with one of R&B's most amazingly acrobatic voices released a new album. So it's especially disappointing that this one isn't a solid "10."

== Singles ==
Two songs off the album "Satisfied" and "I Forgive You" were released as singles. Both tunes got to the US Billboard Adult R&B Songs chart, peaking at No. 11 and No. 13 respectively.

== Track listing ==
All lyrics are written by Rachelle Ferrell, except track 1 written with Jef Lee Johnson.

No.	Title	Music	Length
1.	"Individuality (Can I Be Me?)"	Rachelle Ferrell	4:53
2.	"Sista"	Rachelle Ferrell; George Duke	3:59
3.	"Will You Remember Me?"	Rachelle Ferrell; Jef Lee Johnson	6:17
4.	"I Forgive You"	Rachelle Ferrell	5:30
5.	"I Gotta Go"	Rachelle Ferrell	5:06
6.	"Why You Wanna Mess It All Up?"	Rachelle Ferrell	5:30
7.	"Gaia" (featuring Jonathan Butler)	Rachelle Ferrell; Jonathan Butler	5:44
8.	"Run to Me"	Rachelle Ferrell	4:04
9.	"Reflections of My Heart" (featuring Russ Barnes)	Rachelle Ferrell; George Duke	5:10
10.	"Satisfied"	Rachelle Ferrell; George Duke	5:32
11.	"I Can Explain"	Rachelle Ferrell	8:02
Total length:			59:47

== Personnel ==
- Rachelle Ferrell – vocals, lyrics, producer (track 3), executive producer
- Jonathan Butler – vocals, guitar (track 7)
- Russ Barnes – vocals (track 9), backing vocals (tracks: 1, 6)
- Kenny Lattimore – backing vocals (tracks: 1, 6)
- Jef Lee Johnson – lyrics (track 1), guitar (tracks: 1–6, 8, 9, 11), bass & keyboards (tracks: 1, 3), producer (track 3), recording (tracks: 1, 3)
- George Duke – keyboards (tracks: 2–11), keyboard bass & guitar (tracks: 1, 3), producer (tracks: 1, 2, 4–11)
- Tony Maiden – guitar (track 11)
- Byron Lee Miller – bass (tracks: 4–6, 8, 11)
- John "Lil' John" Roberts – drums (tracks: 1–3, 9, 10)
- Ricardo Jordan – drums (tracks: 4–7, 11)
- Lenny Castro – percussion (tracks: 4–6, 8, 9)

Technical

- Erik Zobler – recording (tracks: 2, 4–11), mixing
- Wayne Holmes – assistant engineering
- Rob Brill – assistant engineering (tracks: 4–6, 8)
- Bryan Jackson – assistant engineering (tracks: 4–6, 8)
- James Stone – assistant engineering (track 11)
- Tommy Steele – art direction
- Norman Moore – design
- Ann Smalley – design
- Beth Herzhaft – photography
- Corine Duke – production coordinator
- Kent Blackwelder Management – management

== Chart history ==
Chart (2000)	Peak position
US Billboard 200	71
US Top R&B/Hip-Hop Albums (Billboard)	16
US Top Jazz Albums (Billboard)	1
