= First Instrument =

- 1995 reissue cover

Studio album by Rachelle Ferrell
- Released: 1990
- Recorded: December 16, 1989 – February 1990
- Studio: Broadway Productions, Englewood, New Jersey; Chelsea Studios, New York, New York; Kajem Victory, Gladwyne, Pennsylvania; Sound on Sound, New York, New York
- Genre: Smooth jazz; soul
- Length: 56:34
- Label: Somethin' Else/Blue Note Records
- Producer: Hitoshi Namekata; Lenny White

Rachelle Ferrell chronology
First Instrument (1990)	Rachelle Ferrell (1992)

Reissue cover
- Original 1990 cover

First Instrument is the 1990 debut album by American vocalist Rachelle Ferrell, first released in Japan on Somethin' Else Records. The album was later released in 1995 in the United States and Europe via Blue Note Records. First Instrument peaked at No. 3 on the US Billboard Top Jazz Albums chart.

== Background ==
First Instrument was produced by Hitoshi Namekata and Lenny White. Artists such as Wayne Shorter, Gil Goldstein, Terence Blanchard, Stanley Clarke, and Pete Levin appear on the album.

== Critical reception ==
Professional ratings
Review scores
Source	Rating
AllMusic	2/5 stars
USA Today	3/4 stars
Charlotte Observer	4/4 stars

James T. Jones IV of USA Today wrote, "This quiet acoustic setting gives this brilliant singer more musical room to expand her impressive vocal chops. Backed by an unintrusive piano trio, she lets fly her vast vocal arsenal, scatting and manipulating a melody as if it were Silly Putty. Her freewheeling improvisations recall early Al Jarreau."

Scott Yanow of AllMusic remarked, "Her voice is quite soulful, making her later shift to R&B less of a surprise in hindsight, but Ferrell seems quite unsure of how to use her wide range, and her improvisations are often quite eccentric. Her lack of warmth and subtlety (along with a tendency to scream and screech in unexpected spots without a buildup) makes it difficult to listen to several of the numbers on this standards-oriented set."

Langston Wertz of the Charlotte Observer proclaimed, "This is an album that was previously available only in Japan and was recorded in 1989 and '90. That this jazz record of "old music" could constitute one of the best things in any genre to be released in the past 18 months says that Ferrell, if nothing else, has staying power. She doesn't make music for the moment."

== Track listing ==
No.	Title	Length
1.	"You Send Me"	5:03
2.	"You Don't Know What Love Is"	5:13
3.	"Bye Bye Blackbird"	4:24
4.	"Prayer Dance"	5:58
5.	"Inchworm"	2:19
6.	"With Every Breath I Take"	6:23
7.	"What Is This Thing Called Love"	1:31
8.	"My Funny Valentine"	7:13
9.	"Don't Waste Your Time"	5:13
10.	"Extensions"	4:58
11.	"Autumn Leaves"	8:16
