= Duke (George Duke album) =

Studio album by George Duke
- Released: March 29, 2005
- Studio: Le Gonks West (Los Angeles, CA)
- Genre: Jazz
- Length: 73:43
- Label: Big Piano Music
- Producer: George Duke

George Duke chronology
Face the Music (2002)	Duke (2005)	In a Mellow Tone (2006)

Singles from Duke
- 1. "T-Jam" Released: 2005

Professional ratings
Review scores
Source	Rating
AllMusic	2.5/5 stars

Duke is the 27th studio album by American keyboardist and record producer George Duke. The single "T-Jam" was nominated for the Grammy Award for Best Pop Instrumental Performance.

== Track listing ==
All tracks are written by George Duke unless otherwise noted.

No.	Title	Writer(s)	Length
1.	"Trust"		5:04
2.	"I Wanna Know"		5:32
3.	"Superwoman"	Stevie Wonder	5:59
4.	"No One"	George Duke, Rachelle Ferrell	4:58
5.	"T-Jam"		5:48
6.	"Somebody's Body"		5:01
7.	"Sausalito"		6:16
8.	"Saturday Night"		6:01
9.	"In Between the Heartaches"	Burt Bacharach, Hal David	5:38
10.	"Hybrids"		18:26
11.	"Homeland"		5:00
Total length:			73:43

== Personnel ==
- George Duke – vocals, keyboards
- John "Jubu" Smith – guitars (1, 2, 5, 6, 8)
- Ray Fuller – guitars (3, 4, 9)
- Paul Jackson Jr. – guitars (4, 6, 9)
- Erick Walls – guitars (5)
- Robert "Fonksta" Bacon – guitars (6, 8)
- Grecco Burrato – guitars (7)
- Jef Lee Johnson – guitars (10)
- Jonathan Butler – guitars (11)
- Alex Al – bass (1, 2)
- Christian McBride – bass (4, 5, 7–11)
- Byron Miller – bass (10)
- Teddy Campbell – drums (1–6, 8, 9, 11)
- Airto Moreira – drums (7, 10), percussion (7, 10)
- Leon "Ndugu" Chancler – drums (10)
- Sheila E. – percussion (5, 8, 10)
- Gerald Albright – saxophones (1, 10, 11)
- Everette Harp – saxophones (1, 4, 5, 10, 11)
- Dan Higgins – saxophones (5)
- Hubert Laws – flute (5)
- Steve Wilson – saxophones (10)
- Bruce Fowler – trombone (1, 10, 11)
- Isaac Smith – trombone (5)
- Rick Baptist – trumpet (1, 10, 11)
- Walt Fowler – trumpet (1, 10, 11)
- Oscar Brashear – trumpet (4, 5)
- Michael "Patches" Stewart – trumpet (6, 10)
- Howard Hewett – backing vocals (1, 2, 8)
- Kim Johnson – backing vocals (1, 2, 8)
- Shannon Pearson – backing vocals (1, 2, 8, 11)
- Eric Benét – vocals (3)
- Rachelle Farrell – backing vocals (4)
- Jim Gilstrap – backing vocals (4, 9)
- Wayne Holmes – backing vocals (9)
- Phil Perry – backing vocals (9)

=== Production ===
- George Duke – producer
- Erik Zobler – recording, mixing, photography
- Stefaniah McGowan – assistant engineer
- John Vestman – mastering at Vestman Mastering Studios (Orange County, California)
- Randall Moses – art direction
- Bobby Holland – photography
- Robert Duffey – photography

== Charts ==
Chart (2005)	Peak position
US Independent Albums (Billboard)	46
US Top Contemporary Jazz Albums (Billboard)	3
US Top Jazz Albums (Billboard)	6
US Top R&B/Hip-Hop Albums (Billboard)	76
