= From Me to You (disambiguation) =

"From Me to You" is a song by The Beatles.

From Me to You may also refer to:

- From Me to You (George Duke album), 1977
- From Me to You (Yui album), 2006
- From Me to You, the second studio album from Quadeca, 2021
- From Me to You, an EP by Susanna Hoffs, 2012
- "From Me to You", a song composed by Fabian Andre
- "From Me to You", a song by Janis Ian on her album Between the Lines, 1975
- "From Me to U", a song by Babymetal featuring Poppy, from their album Metal Forth, 2025

== See also ==
- From Me to U, a 2003 album by Juelz Santana
- Kimi ni Todoke: From Me to You, a shōjo manga by Karuho Shiina
