= Is Love Enough? =

Studio album by George Duke
- Released: March 25, 1997
- Studio: LeGonks West (West Hollywood, California); Conway Studios (Hollywood, California)
- Genre: Jazz, R&B
- Length: 1:11:41
- Label: Warner Bros.
- Producer: George Duke

George Duke chronology
Muir Woods Suite (1996)	Is Love Enough? (1997)	After Hours (1998)

Is Love Enough? is a studio album by American jazz musician George Duke, released in 1997 on Warner Bros. Records. The album peaked at No. 2 on the Billboard Top Contemporary Jazz Albums chart and No. 4 on the Billboard Top Jazz Albums chart.

== Critical reception ==
Professional ratings
Review scores
Source	Rating
AllMusic	2.5/5 stars

Scott Yanow of AllMusic declared, "Although George Duke planned to make this recording half R&B and half jazz, the former dominates. In fact, other than brief moments from the keyboardist/leader and short contributions by the likes of Dianne Reeves, Everette Harp, George Howard, Norman Brown and Jonathan Butler, this is essentially a highly produced R&B set".

== Track listing ==
All tracks are written by George Duke.

No.	Title	Length
1.	"Into the Future" (Prelude)	2:05
2.	"Is Love Enough?"	5:20
3.	"It's Summertime"	5:24
4.	"Love Songs"	5:39
5.	"It's Our World"	4:24
6.	"Fill the Need"	5:32
7.	"Kinda Low"	6:16
8.	"Time and Space" (Interlude)	1:27
9.	"Back in the Day"	4:52
10.	"This Place I Call Home"	4:20
11.	"How About You?"	4:44
12.	"Laid Back Sunday"	4:55
13.	"Thinkin' 'Bout You"	5:02
14.	"I'm Falling"	5:32
15.	"Whatever Happened To..."	4:44
16.	"Back from the Future"	1:25

== Personnel ==
Musicians

- George Duke – synthesizers (1, 8, 16), keyboards (2–7, 9–15), bass solo (5)
- Ray Fuller – guitars (3, 4, 7, 12, 14), rhythm guitar (11)
- Paul Jackson Jr. – guitars (5), acoustic guitar (13, 15), guitar solo (15)
- Doc Powell – guitars (6)
- Jonathan Butler – guitars (10), bass (10)
- Norman Brown – guitar solo (11)
- Dori Caymmi – acoustic guitar (15)
- Byron Miller – bass ad-libs (2), bass (6, 7)
- Larry Kimpel – bass (11–13)
- Abraham Laboriel – bass (15)
- Leon "Ndugu" Chancler – drums (2, 6, 7, 15)
- Little John Roberts – drums (3, 10, 14)
- Michael White – drums (11, 12)
- Dennis Chambers – drums (13)
- Lenny Castro – percussion (3, 11, 12)
- Airto Moreira – percussion (9, 15)
- Paulinho da Costa – percussion (13–15)
- Everette Harp – alto saxophone (3), tenor saxophone (11)
- George Howard – soprano saxophone (4, 12)
- Gerald Albright – alto saxophone (5), tenor saxophone (5)
- Bennie Maupin – tenor saxophone (9), bass clarinet (9)
- Bruce Fowler – trombone (9, 11)
- Ray Brown – trumpet (5)
- Oscar Brashear – trumpet (9)
- Gary Grant – trumpet (11)
- Jerry Hey – trumpet (11)

Vocalists

- George Duke – vocals (2, 6, 11, 12, 14, 15), lead vocals (4, 13), backing vocals (4, 10), rapnotics (7)
- Rachelle Ferrell – vocals (2, 6), backing vocals (4, 14)
- Jim Gilstrap – vocals (2, 3, 6, 11, 12), backing vocals (4, 13, 14)
- Lori Perry – vocals (2), lead vocals (5), backing vocals (5, 13)
- Phil Perry – vocals (3, 11, 12)
- Vesta Williams – lead vocals (5)
- Lynn Davis – backing vocals (5, 13)
- Josie James – backing vocals (5, 10, 13)
- Eddie Griffin – rapology (5)
- Malcolm-Jamal Warner – rapology (5)
- Leon "Ndugu" Chancler – rapnotics (7)
- Byron Miller – rapnotics (7)
- Jonathan Butler – vocals (10), backing vocals (10)
- Dianne Reeves – vocals (10), backing vocals (10)
- Dori Caymmi – vocals during vamp (15)

=== Production ===
- George Duke – producer
- Erik Zobler – recording, mixing
- Wayne Holmes – additional engineer
- Brian Gardner – mastering
- Corine Duke – production assistant
- Stine Schyberg – art direction, design
- Tom Tavee – photography
- Consolidated Management – management
