= Live On Tour In Europe =

Live on Tour in Europe

Live album by Billy Cobham & George Duke
- Released: 1976
- Studio: Mountain (Montreux, Switzerland); The Manor (Shipton-on-Cherwell, England)
- Genre: Jazz
- Length: 46:20
- Label: Atlantic
- Producer: George Duke

George Duke chronology
Liberated Fantasies (1976)	Live on Tour in Europe (1976)	From Me to You (1977)

Billy Cobham chronology
Life & Times (1976)	Live In Europe (1976)	Magic (1977)

Live on Tour in Europe is a live album by American jazz musicians Billy Cobham & George Duke released in 1976 on Atlantic Records. The album peaked at No. 7 on the US Billboard Top Jazz LPs chart.

== Critical reception ==
Professional ratings
Review scores
Source	Rating
AllMusic	3/5 stars

Robert Taylor of AllMusic noted "Following two studio recordings, this impressive band hit the road and cut this session with keyboardist George Duke. Their encounter provided for an uneven, but infectious, recording...Despite some corny moments, this is a fun session that continues to be one of Cobham's most sought after recordings."

== Track listing ==
No.	Title	Length
1.	"Hip Pockets"	7:08
2.	"Ivory Tattoo"	4:28
3.	"Space Lady"	4:43
4.	"Almustafa the Beloved"	6:54
5.	"Do What Cha Wanna"	4:35
6.	"Frankenstein Goes to the Disco"	7:17
7.	"Sweet Wine"	3:55
8.	"Juicy"	7:20
