= What Goes Around Comes Around (disambiguation) =

What Goes Around Comes Around is a 1979 album by Waylon Jennings.

What Goes Around Comes Around may also refer to:

- "What Goes Around... Comes Around", a 2006 song by Justin Timberlake
- "What Goes Around Comes Around" (George Duke song), 2010
- "What Goes Around Comes Around", a song by Catch 22 from their 2000 album Alone in a Crowd
- "What Goes Around Comes Around", a song by Lost Frequencies from the 2016 album Less Is More
- "What Goes Around Comes Around", an episode of American TV series Sex and the City
- "What Goes Around, Comes Around", an episode of 1990 TV series Swamp Thing

== See also ==
- "What Go Around Come Around, Kid", a song by Cypress Hill from their 1993 album Black Sunday
