= You Never Know (George Duke song) =

Single by George Duke

from the album Dreamweaver
- Released: 2013
- Genre: Jazz
- Label: Heads Up International
- Songwriter(s): George Duke
- Producer(s): George Duke

George Duke singles chronology
"What Goes Around Comes Around" (2010)	"You Never Know (George Duke song)" (2013)	"Bring Me Joy (Al Jarreau Featuring George Duke & Boney James)" (2014)

"You Never Know" is a song by American musician George Duke, released as a single in 2013, by Heads Up International. The song reached No. 14 on the US Billboard Smooth Jazz Songs chart.

== Overview ==
You Never Know was produced and composed by George Duke. The song appears on Duke's 2013 studio album Dreamweaver.

== Critical reception ==
Jeff Winbush of All About Jazz commented "The serious intent behind "You Never Know" belies its breezy, lightweight sound, but it's a caution to treasure every moment because you never know when there will be no more moments."

== Charts ==
Chart (2013)	Peak position
US Smooth Jazz Songs (Billboard)	14
