= Muir Woods Suite =

Live album by George Duke
- Released: 1996
- Recorded: July 12, 1993
- Studio: Montreux Jazz Festival, Montreux, Switzerland
- Genre: Jazz
- Length: 49:48
- Label: Warner Bros.
- Producer: George Duke

George Duke chronology
| Illusions (1995) | Muir Woods Suite (1996) | Is Love Enough? (1997) |

Muir Woods Suite is a live album by American jazz musician George Duke released in 1996 on Warner Bros. Records. The album peaked at No. 11 on the Billboard Traditional Jazz Albums chart and No. 30 on the Billboard Top Jazz Albums chart.

== Critical reception ==
Professional ratings
Review scores
| Source | Rating |
|---|---|
| AllMusic | 3/5 stars |

William Ruhlmann of AllMusic said, "George Duke's Muir Woods Suite is a musical work for orchestra (L'orchestre National de Lille, conducted by Ettore Stratta) and jazz group (himself on piano, Stanley Clarke on bass, Chester Thompson on drums, Paulinho Da Costa on percussion). As that combination suggests, it's eclectic... Consistently engaging, but disparate, the suite has the air of a movie soundtrack."

== Track listing ==
| No. | Title | Length |
|---|---|---|
| 1. | "Phase 1" | 3:29 |
| 2. | "Phase 2" | 2:53 |
| 3. | "Phase 3" | 5:10 |
| 4. | "Percussion Solo" | 2:03 |
| 5. | "Phase 4" | 2:19 |
| 6. | "Phase 5" | 5:44 |
| 7. | "Bass Solo" | 1:15 |
| 8. | "Phase 6 (Love Theme)" | 7:53 |
| 9. | "Drum Solo" | 3:01 |
| 10. | "Phase 7" | 9:32 |
| 11. | "Montreaux Nights" (bonus track) | 6:29 |
