= After Hours (George Duke album) =

Studio album by George Duke
- Released: September 22, 1998
- Studio: LeGonks West (West Hollywood, California)
- Genre: Jazz-funk; R&B; jazz
- Length: 58:12
- Label: Warner Bros.
- Producer: George Duke

George Duke chronology
Is Love Enough? (1997)	After Hours (1998)	Cool (2000)

After Hours is a studio album by American keyboardist George Duke released in 1998 on Warner Bros Records. The album reached No. 8 on the Billboard Top Jazz Albums chart and No. 7 on the Billboard Top Contemporary Jazz Albums chart.

== Overview ==
After Hours was produced by George Duke. Artists such as Christian McBride, Paul Jackson Jr., and Lenny Castro appear on the album.

== Critical reception ==
Professional ratings
Review scores
Source	Rating
AllMusic	3/5 stars

Johnathan Widran of AllMusic wrote, "After years of producing albums which were more pop/funk than jazz oriented, George Duke simmers down, leaves off the R&B vocals, and takes a little creative license on the self-proclaimed 'mood record' After Hours."

After Hours was nominated for a Grammy Award in the category of Best Contemporary Jazz Performance.

== Track listing ==
All tracks are written by George Duke, except where indicated.

After Hours track listing
No.	Title	Writer(s)	Length
1.	"Rush Hour/Road Rage"		6:50
2.	"After Dinner Drink"		6:18
3.	"Anticipation"		4:38
4.	"The Touch"		5:30
5.	"It's On"		6:11
6.	"Together as One"		5:45
7.	"From Dusk to Dawn"		7:12
8.	"Peace"		2:10
9.	"Sweet Dreams"		5:33
10.	"Wake Me Gently"		6:49
11.	"My Bells"	Bill Evans	1:16

== Personnel ==
- George Duke – acoustic piano (1–3, 6, 8–11), Rhodes electric piano (1–4, 7, 10), synthesizers (1–4, 7, 10), Wurlitzer 140b (5), E4 strings (8)
- Paul Jackson Jr. – electric guitar (1, 5), acoustic guitar (3, 4)
- Ray Fuller – electric guitar (5, 7, 10)
- Christian McBride – acoustic bass (1, 6, 9)
- Larry Kimpel – fretless bass (2, 4), electric bass (3)
- Byron Miller – electric bass (5, 7, 10)
- Leon "Ndugu" Chancler – drums (1–7, 9, 10)
- Lenny Castro – percussion (1–4, 7, 10)
- Sheridon Stokes – bass flute (4)

=== Production ===
- George Duke – producer
- Erik Zobler – recording, mixing
- Wayne Holmes – assistant engineer
- Doug Sax – mastering at The Mastering Lab (Hollywood, California)
- Corine Duke – production coordinator
- Stephen Walker – art direction
- Mark Holley – design
- Bobby Holland – photography
- Herb Cohen – management
