= Cool (George Duke album) =

Studio album by George Duke
- Released: September 19, 2000
- Recorded: March–May 2000
- Studio: LeGonks West (West Hollywood, California)
- Genre: Jazz-funk; jazz
- Length: 1:06:27
- Label: Warner Bros. Records
- Producer: George Duke

George Duke chronology
After Hours (1998)	Cool (2000)	Face the Music (2002)

Cool is a studio album by American keyboardist George Duke. The album reached No. 10 on the Billboard Top Contemporary Jazz Albums chart, No. 11 on the Billboard Top Jazz Albums chart, and No. 27 on the UK Jazz & Blues Albums chart.

== Overview ==
Artists such as Flora Purim, Howard Hewett, Everette Harp, Philip Bailey, Paul Jackson Jr., Lynn Davis, Josie James, and Robert Brookins appear on the album.

== Critical reception ==
Professional ratings
Review scores
Source	Rating
AllMusic	3.5/5 stars

With a 3.5 out of 5 star rating Paula Edelstein of AllMusic wrote "Cool is a CD filled with a diverse range of musical styles and expressions, and whether he is the lead vocalist, keyboardist, or providing background vocals, the master is the architect of funk, pop, Latin, gospel, blues, and R&B passion on this excellent musical mission."

Mike Bradley of The Times declared Cool "contains an array of well-crafted songs that emphasises his status as one of the elder statesmen of jazz-funk. From the deep funk of Wake Up and Smell the Coffee with its unmistakable references to Sly Stone's Thank You (Falettinme Be Mice Elf Agin) to the rolling, ringing Latin tones of If You Will and the smoky balladry of Never Be Another, this is a showcase for Duke's many musical skills."

Cool was also Grammy nominated in the category of Best Traditional R&B Vocal Album.

== Track listing ==
Cool track listing
No.	Title	Writer(s)	Length
1.	"Marin City"	George Duke	5:20
2.	"Wake Up, Smell the Coffee"	George Duke	4:42
3.	"She's Amazing"	George Duke	4:43
4.	"If You Will"	George Duke	5:03
5.	"Never Be Another"	George Duke	4:37
6.	"Ancient Source"	George Duke	6:00
7.	"Only You Understand"	George Duke	4:17
8.	"If He Ain't Mr. Right (Then He's Mr. Wrong)"	George Duke	5:30
9.	"Sexy Cool"	George Duke	4:56
10.	"All About You"	George Duke	3:48
11.	"Whatever It Takes"	George Duke	3:43
12.	"The Times We've Known"	George Duke, Herbert Kretzmer	6:21
13.	"At a Glance"	George Duke	7:15

== Personnel ==
- George Duke – keyboards, lead vocals (1–4, 6, 8, 9), backing vocals (3, 4), vocals (12)
- Tony Maiden – guitars (1, 2), electric guitars (9)
- Ray Fuller – guitars (3), electric guitars (5, 7)
- Paul Jackson Jr. – electric guitars (4, 6)
- Jef Lee Johnson – electric guitars (8, 10–13)
- Byron Miller – bass (7, 10–13)
- Leon "Ndugu" Chancler – drums (7, 8, 10–13)
- Lenny Castro – percussion (8, 10–13)
- Bennie Maupin – tenor saxophone (1)
- Everette Harp – tenor saxophone (4), saxophones (10, 11)
- Reggie Young – trombone (4, 10, 11), bass trombone (10)
- Michael "Patches" Stewart – trumpet (1, 8)
- Gary Grant – trumpet (4, 10, 11), flugelhorn (10, 11)
- Jerry Hey – trumpet (4, 10, 11), flugelhorn (10, 11)
- Philip Bailey – backing vocals (1, 2)
- Robert Brookins – backing vocals (1, 2)
- Howard Hewett – backing vocals (1, 2)
- Kim Johnson – girlfriend vocals (2), backing vocals (6, 9, 10)
- Jim Gilstrap – backing vocals (3)
- Chanté Moore – vocals (3), backing vocals (3)
- Diana Booker – backing vocals (4)
- Carl Carwell – backing vocals (4)
- Lynn Davis – backing vocals (4)
- Rashid Duke – backing vocals (4)
- Josie James – backing vocals (4)
- Flora Purim – vocal effects (4)
- Anointed – vocals (5)
- Kandy Johnson – backing vocals (6, 9, 10)
- Krystal Johnson – backing vocals (6, 9, 10)
- Lavan Davis, Rick Nelson, Carol Perry, Darlene Perry, Lori Perry and Sharon Perry – choir (12)

=== Production ===
- George Duke – producer, arrangements
- Erik Zobler – recording, mixing
- Wayne Holmes – assistant engineer
- Marnie Riley – assistant engineer
- Doug Sax – mastering at The Mastering Lab (Hollywood, California)
- Corine Duke – production coordinator
- Katherine Delaney – art direction, design
- Bobby Holland – photography
- Herb Cohen – management
