= Illusions (George Duke album) =

Studio album by George Duke
- Released: January 24, 1995
- Studio: Conway Studios (Hollywood, California); LeGonks West (West Hollywood, California); Fantasy Studios (Berkeley, California); O'Henry Sound Studios (Burbank, California)
- Genre: R&B; jazz
- Length: 1:06:52
- Label: Warner Bros.
- Producer: George Duke

George Duke chronology
Snapshot (1992)	Illusions (1995)	Muir Woods Suite (1996)

Illusions is a studio album by American keyboardist George Duke released in 1995 on Warner Bros Records. The album reached No. 33 on the Billboard Top R&B Albums chart and No. 3 on both the Billboard Top Jazz Albums and Top Contemporary Jazz Albums charts.

== Overview ==
Illusions was produced by George Duke. Artists such as the Emotions, Dianne Reeves, Marvin Winans, and James Ingram appear on the album.

== Critical reception ==
Professional ratings
Review scores
Source	Rating
AllMusic	4/5 stars

AllMusic's Craig Lytle commented:

On this album, first and foremost, Duke utilizes this vast platform to express his musical passions. And in his own ingenious way, he voices his indiscreet discernment on the many virtues and vices of society. This set is eclectic, and at times, audaciously eccentric. Of the 13 selections, four are instrumentals and several are tinted with a sweet R&B coating. However, every number is seasoned with Duke's indelible jazzy melodies and interludes.

== Track listing ==
All tracks are written by George Duke, expect where indicated.

Illusions track listing
No.	Title	Writer(s)	Length
1.	"Genesis"		1:34
2.	"500 Miles to Go"		5:00
3.	"411"		5:10
4.	"Love Can Be So Cold"		5:42
5.	"Illusions"		5:00
6.	"The Simple Things"		5:16
7.	"Life and Times"		6:07
8.	"Look What We Started Now"		5:55
9.	"C'est la Vie"	Michael Sembello, Dick Rudolph	4:51
10.	"Buffalo Soldiers"		4:50
11.	"Money"		5:16
12.	"No Greater Love"		4:46
13.	"So I'll Pretend"		7:25

== Personnel ==
Musicians

- George Duke – keyboards (1–12), acoustic piano (13)
- Ray Fuller – guitars (2–4, 6–12), rhythm guitar (5)
- Michael Landau – lead guitar (5)
- Michael Sembello – guitars (9)
- Paul Jackson Jr. – guitars (11), acoustic guitar (12)
- Larry Kimpel – bass (5, 7, 9, 11, 12)
- Stanley Clarke – piccolo bass (5)
- Byron Miller – bass (6, 8)
- Ray Brown – bass (13)
- Dennis Chambers – drums (5, 12)
- Leon "Ndugu" Chancler – drums (6, 8)
- Herman Matthews – drums (11)
- Terri Lyne Carrington – drums (13)
- Paulinho da Costa – percussion (6)
- Everette Harp – alto saxophone (7), soprano sax solo (9), soprano saxophone (10)
- Larry Williams – tenor saxophone (9, 10)
- Dan Higgins – tenor saxophone (11)
- Kirk Whalum – tenor saxophone (13)
- Bill Reichenbach Jr. – trombone (9)
- Lew McCreary – trombone (11)
- Gary Grant – trumpet (9, 11), flugelhorn (9, 11)
- Jerry Hey – trumpet (9, 11), flugelhorn (9, 11)

Vocalists

- George Duke – lead vocal (3–5, 9), backing vocals (3, 9), vocals (6), vocal (7, 11), "ee-yo-ah" backing vocals (9), narration (10)
- Alex Brown – vocals (3, 11)
- Lynn Davis – vocals (3, 11)
- Josie James – vocals (3, 11)
- Lori Perry – vocals (3, 6), vocal fills (4), backing vocals (7)
- Phil Perry – vocals (3)
- Rachelle Ferrell – backing vocals (3, 4, 9), vocal (7)
- Jim Gilstrap – backing vocals (3, 4, 9), vocals (6)
- Chante Moore – backing vocals (5)
- Jeanette Hawes – vocal (7)
- Sheila Hutchinson – vocal (7)
- Joyce Kennedy – vocal (7)
- James Ingram – vocal (7)
- Wanda Vaughan – vocal (7)
- Mervyn Warren – vocal (7)
- Marvin Winans – vocal (7)
- Carolyn Perry – backing vocals (7)
- Darlene Perry – backing vocals (7)
- Sharon Perry – backing vocals (7)
- Carl Carwell – "ee-yo-ah" backing vocals (9), vocals (11)
- Michael Sembello – "ee-yo-ah" backing vocals (9)
- Steve Ford – "money zombie" (11)
- Erik Zobler – "money zombie" (11)
- Dianne Reeves – vocal (13)

=== Production ===
- George Duke – producer
- Erik Zobler – recording, mixing
- Wayne Holmes – additional engineer
- Jerry Finn – assistant engineer
- Sean O'Dwyer – assistant engineer
- Brett Swain – assistant engineer
- Brian Gardner – mastering at Bernie Grundman Mastering (Hollywood, California)
- Corine Duke – production assistant
- Robert Reed – cover artwork
- Caroline Balog – art direction, design
- Arnold Turner – photography
- Herb Cohen – management
