= Night After Night (George Duke album) =

Studio album by George Duke
- Released: 1989
- Studio: LeGonks West (West Hollywood, California); Ocean Way Recording and Sunset Sound (Hollywood, California); Mama Jo's Studio (North Hollywood, California)
- Genre: Jazz-funk; pop
- Length: 1:00:42
- Label: Elektra
- Producer: George Duke

George Duke chronology
George Duke (1986)	Night After Night (1989)	Snapshot (1992)

Night After Night is a studio album by American keyboardist George Duke released in 1989 on Elektra Records. The album reached No. 11 on the US Billboard Contemporary Jazz Albums chart.

== Overview ==
Night After Night was produced by George Duke. Artists such as Howard Hewett, James Ingram, Johnny Gill and Jeffrey Osborne appear on the album.

== Critical reception ==
Professional ratings
Review scores
Source	Rating
AllMusic	4/5 stars

Johnathan Widran of AllMusic wrote, "Having been a top notch producer for such hot R&B acts as Stephanie Mills, Deniece Williams, and Jeffrey Osborne throughout the '80s, it comes as no surprise that Duke would deliver such a powerhouse of dance funk instrumentals towards the end of that decade. Being so pop oriented, however, what comes as a pleasant surprise is just how much room is left for Duke to display his sense of improvisation on the many keyboards he uses here."

Calvin Gilbert of The Advocate declared, "Night After Night contains little to please anyone willing to settle for the lowest common denominator that's being pushed as music today. If your taste runs to an urban contemporary sound with a decidedly sophisticated approach, Duke's album is a great place to look."

== Track listing ==
All tracks are written by George Duke, except where noted.

Night After Night track listing
No.	Title	Writer(s)	Length
1.	"Miss Wiggle"		4:51
2.	"Children of the Night"	Duke, James D-Train Williams	5:12
3.	"Love Ballad"	Skip Scarborough	4:39
4.	"Guilty"		3:44
5.	"Same Ole Love"	Marilyn McLeod, Darryl K. Roberts	4:22
6.	"Say Hello"		4:39
7.	"You Are the Only One in My Life"	Duke, Williams	5:29
8.	"Brazilian Coffee"		1:10
9.	"This Lovin'"		5:08
10.	"Mystery Eyes"		4:23
11.	"560 SL"		3:51
12.	"Fuzzzion"		6:49
13.	"Rise Up"		5:34

== Personnel ==
Musicians

- George Duke – lead vocals, backing vocals, acoustic piano, Castle Bar clavinet, Synclavier, Minimoog, Roland D-550, Roland Super Jupiter, Yamaha TX816, bass solos (1–11, 13)
- Paul Jackson Jr. – guitars (1–10, 13)
- Michael Landau – guitars (11)
- Michael Sembello – guitars (12)
- Freddie Washington – bass (1–3, 5–11, 13)
- Byron Miller – bass (4)
- Stanley Clarke – bass (12)
- Alphonso Johnson – fretless bass (12)
- John Robinson – drums (1–10, 13)
- Rayford Griffin – drums (11, 12)
- Airto Moriera – percussion (12)
- Larry Williams – tenor saxophone
- Marc Russo – alto saxophone (4)
- Bill Reichenbach Jr. – trombone
- Gary Grant – trumpet
- Jerry Hey – trumpet
- Jean-Luc Ponty – violin (12)

Vocalists

- Alexandra Brown
- Carl Carwell
- Lynn Davis
- Joey Diggs
- George Duke
- Johnny Gill
- Howard Hewett
- James Ingram
- Natalie Jackson
- Josie James
- Keith John
- Marcy Levy
- Jeffrey Osborne
- Phil Perry

=== Production ===
- George Duke – producer
- Erik Zobler – recording, mixing
- Kevin Fisher – assistant engineer
- Steve Ford – assistant engineer
- Mitch Gibson – assistant engineer
- Steve Holroyd – assistant engineer
- Brian Gardner – mastering at Bernie Grundman Mastering (Hollywood, California)
- Stephanie McCravey – production coordinator
- Alice Murrell – production coordinator
- Karen Boboltz – art direction
- Henry Diltz – photography
- Rosanne Percivalle – illustration
- Thomas Wells – wardrobe
- Evelyn Vanozz – business
- Herb Cohen – management
