= Déjà Vu (George Duke album) =

Studio album by George Duke
- Released: August 2010
- Studio: Le Gonks West, Los Angeles, CA
- Genre: Jazz-funk; R&B; Jazz
- Length: 55:47
- Label: Heads Up
- Producer: George Duke

George Duke chronology
Dukey Treats (2008)	Déjà Vu (2010)	Dreamweaver (2013)

Déjà Vu is a studio album by American keyboardist George Duke released in 2010 on Heads Up International. The album reached No. 9 on the Billboard Top Jazz Albums chart and No. 7 on the Billboard Top Contemporary Jazz Albums chart.

== Overview ==
Déjà Vu was produced by George Duke. Artists such as Oscar Brashear, Paul Jackson Jr., and Everette Harp appear on the album.

== Critical reception ==
Professional ratings
Review scores
Source	Rating
AllMusic	4/5 stars
USA Today	3/5 stars
Evening Standard	4/5 stars
Dallas Morning News	(B+)
Philadelphia Daily News	(B)

Steve Jones of USA Today praised the album saying, "More than 30 years ago, pianist George Duke was getting us all funked up with tracks like "Dukey Stick" and "Reach For It." On his new "Deja Vu," he revisits the synthesized soul/jazz fusion days of the '70s. It covers the same sonic territory as 2008's "Dukey Treats," though this time around there is a bit more jazz to balance the funk...Duke wisely gives the music a contemporary twist, so that this is more than a just a wistful trip down memory lane." Simon Broughton of the Evening Standard favourably found "A HEAVYWEIGHT improviser yet funky enough for any dance-club crowd, George Duke touches hearts, minds and feet wherever he performs. The latest studio offering by this crowd-pleasing Californian keyboarder gives his soulful originals (Bring Me Joy, Oh Really?) a typically warm ambience."

With a 4/5 star rating Thom Jurek of AllMusic declared "Déjà Vu revisits Duke's love of electric funky jazz. Here he recalls some of the production and musical techniques he employed in the '70s. Along with playing a load of synths (mono and analog), Rhodes and Wurlitzer electric pianos, clavinet, acoustic piano, and even miniMoog bass are in abundance, too. The production is pure retro; compared to the contemporary jazz recordings of the 21st century, Déjà Vu sounds almost organic. Duke composed, produced, and arranged the set as well." Brian Soergel of JazzTimes scribed "Keyboardist-composer-producer George Duke has tuned his funky-dukey-stick shtick down a notch with Déjà Vu, which follows the intense energy of 2008’s Dukey Treats. This one’s for Duke’s R&B fans and those who like their contemporary jazz served with heft and verve."

Nate Chinen of the New York Times remarked "Haven't we been here before? Deja Vu, the new album by the pianist-composer-producer George Duke, answers that question in the affirmative. Proudly slick, it's a throwback to sounds of Mr. Duke's early career, in the 1970s, funk, fusion, StevieWonderish soul and the milder stirrings of Mario Tarradell of then nascent smooth jazz." Mario Tarradell of the Dallas Morning News noted "George Duke's sterling reputation in R&B, jazz and fusions thereof is firmly cemented. He could easily rest on his laurels...It's even more impressive that he keeps going, turning in another slamming paean to retro funk, R&B, jazz and Latin grooves on Déjà Vu." Jonathan Takiff of the Philadelphia Daily News scribed "Seasoned keyboardist/singer George Duke lives up to the billing of his new album called "Deja Vu" (Heads Up, B) with a flashback of fusion crossover styles."

== Track listing ==
All tracks are written by George Duke.

Déjà Vu track listing
No.	Title	Length
1.	"A Melody"	4:31
2.	"You Touch My Brain"	6:23
3.	"What Goes Around Comes Around"	5:35
4.	"Bring Me Joy"	4:48
5.	"Ripple in Time"	6:33
6.	"Oh Really"	5:53
7.	"6 O'Clock Revisited"	4:27
8.	"Come to Me Now"	5:50
9.	"Stupid Is as Stupid Does"	6:42
10.	"Déjà Vu"	5:06
