= A Funky Thide of Sings =

Studio album by Billy Cobham
- Released: 1975 (LP) May 18, 1999 (CD)
- Studio: Columbia, San Francisco, California
- Genre: Jazz funk, jazz fusion
- Length: 44:59 (LP) (CD)
- Label: Atlantic
- Producer: Billy Cobham, Mark Meyerson, Donald Elfman & Naomi Yoshii

Billy Cobham chronology
Shabazz (1975)	A Funky Thide of Sings (1975)	Life & Times (1976)

Professional ratings
Review scores
Source	Rating
Allmusic	3/5 stars
The Rolling Stone Jazz Record Guide	2/5 stars
The Penguin Guide to Jazz Recordings	3/4 stars

A Funky Thide of Sings is a 1975 studio album by Billy Cobham.

== Track listing ==
1. "Panhandler" (Billy Cobham) – 3:50
2. "Sorcery" (Keith Jarrett) – 2:26
3. "A Funky Thide of Sings" (Billy Cobham) – 3:23
4. "Thinking of You" (Alex Blake) – 4:12
5. "Some Skunk Funk" (Randy Brecker) – 5:07
6. "Light at the End of the Tunnel" (Billy Cobham) – 3:37
7. "A Funky Kind of Thing" (Billy Cobham) – 9:24
8. "Moody Modes" (Milcho Leviev) – 12:16

== Personnel ==
- Billy Cobham – synthesizer, percussion
- John Scofield – guitar
- Alex Blake – bass
- Milcho Leviev – keyboards
- Michael Brecker – saxophone (on all but 3)
- Randy Brecker – trumpet (on all but 3)
- Glenn Ferris – trombone (on all but 3)
- Larry Schneider – saxophone (on 3)
- Walt Fowler – trumpet (on 3)
- Tom Malone – trombone, piccolo (on 3)
- Rebop Kwaku Baah – congas (on 1,3)

== Charts ==
Chart (1975)	Peak position
US Billboard 200	79
US Billboard R&B Albums	32
US Billboard Jazz Albums	15
