= Rachelle Ferrell (album) =

Studio album by Rachelle Ferrell
- Released: September 12, 1992
- Recorded: 1991–1992
- Genre: Smooth jazz; soul
- Length: 65:32
- Label: Capitol
- Producer: George Duke; Michael J. Powell; Rachelle Ferrell; Barry Eastmond

Rachelle Ferrell chronology
Somethin' Else (1990)	Rachelle Ferrell (1992)	Individuality (Can I Be Me?) (2000)

Singles from Rachelle Ferrell
- 1. "'Til You Come Back to Me" Released: August 11, 1992; 2. "Welcome to My Love" Released: January 19, 1993; 3. "Nothing Has Ever Felt Like This" Released: July 21, 1994; 4. "With Open Arms" Released: September 20, 1994

Professional ratings
Review scores
Source	Rating
AllMusic	3/5 stars
USA Today	4/5 stars

Rachelle Ferrell is the second album by American vocalist Rachelle Ferrell released in 1992 on Capitol Records. This album has been certified Gold in the US by the RIAA.

== Critical reception ==
James T. Jones IV of USA Today favourably found, "an enthralling collection of cool R&B and fireside love songs, recalling the best of Anita Baker and Dianne Reeves. As luscious as her songs is her voice, which dips and dives effortlessly, from a sultry low range to piercing, Minnie Riperton-like high notes."

Jonathan Takiff of the Philadelphia Daily News declared, "Sit up and pay attention to the classiest ''Quiet Storm" soul/jazz/pop session of the year, and best seasoned ''new" talent to hit the scene since Oleta Adams. Yeadon, Pa.-rooted Farrell has the haunting voice of an angel - warm, expressively pliant and yet extremely accurate through six octaves - and produces galvanic goosebumps in listeners. Her mostly self-penned material is ever tasty and sophisticated, and dressed up by producer/keyboardist George Duke with the sort of jazz- flecked small combo arrangements that'd do an Al Jarreau proud.

Sonia Murray of the Atlanta Journal Constitution proclaimed, "Pennsylvania-born Rachelle Ferrell has brought her 6 1/2-octave range voice, in all of its R&B, pop and jazz splendor, home...Each song is its own experience, which once completed, compels you to listen again and again."

Sherri Winston of the Sun Sentinel praised the album saying, "There is nothing about this CD that I didn't like. The arrangements are great. The instruments have clarity but did not intrude over the vocals -- the strength of Ferrell's voice won't let them. Beyond her obvious musical ability -- she was a schoolmate of Branford Marsalis at the Berklee School of Music -- the lyrics Ferrell sings are insightful, touching, haunting."

Alex Henderson of Allmusic claimed, "Rachelle Ferrell wore two hats in the 1990s: straight-ahead jazz singer and commercial R&B/pop singer along the lines of Anita Baker, Miki Howard, and Angela Bofill. Produced mostly by George Duke, this self-titled album is an example of her R&B/pop side."

As well this album placed at No. 2 on James T. Jones IV of USA Today's list of 1992's best R&B albums.

== Track listing ==
No.	Title	Writer(s)	Producer(s)	Length
1.	"I'm Special"	Rachelle Ferrell	George Duke	6:11
2.	"Welcome to My Love"	Rachelle Ferrell; George Duke; Donald Robinson	George Duke	5:39
3.	"Waiting"	Rachelle Ferrell; Michael J. Powell; Vernon Fails	Michael J. Powell	6:02
4.	"It Only Took a Minute"	Danny Sembello; Donnell Spencer; Marti Sharron	George Duke	4:42
5.	"With Open Arms"	Rachelle Ferrell; Donald Robinson	George Duke	6:23
6.	"'Til You Come Back to Me"	Karyn White; Steve Harvey; Valerie Davis	George Duke; Rachelle Ferrell; Erik Zobler	6:15
7.	"You Can't Get (Until You Learn to Start Giving)"	Rachelle Ferrell	George Duke	3:46
8.	"Nothing Has Ever Felt Like This" (featuring Will Downing)	Rachelle Ferrell	Barry Eastmond	6:25
9.	"I Know You Love Me"	Rachelle Ferrell	Michael J. Powell	3:56
10.	"Sentimental"	Rachelle Ferrell; Tena Clark	George Duke	3:37
11.	"Could've Fooled Me"	David Foster; Dennis Lambert	George Duke	4:38
12.	"Too Late"	Rachelle Ferrell	George Duke	4:11
13.	"Peace on Earth"	Rachelle Ferrell	Rachelle Ferrell	4:19
Total length:				1:05:32

== Charts ==
=== Weekly charts ===
Chart (1994)	Peak position
US Billboard 200	161
US Top R&B/Hip-Hop Albums (Billboard)	25
US Heatseekers Albums (Billboard)	4

=== Year-end charts ===
Chart (1994)	Position
US Top R&B/Hip-Hop Albums (Billboard)	65
Chart (1995)	Position
US Top R&B/Hip-Hop Albums (Billboard)	92

== Certifications ==
Region	Certification	Certified units/sales
United States (RIAA)	Gold	500,000^{^}
^{^} Shipments figures based on certification alone.
