= Faces in Reflection =

1974 studio album by George Duke

Studio album by George Duke
- Released: 1974
- Genre: Jazz-funk; jazz fusion
- Label: MPS; BASF
- Producer: Balhard G. Falk

George Duke chronology
The Inner Source (1973)	Faces in Reflection (1974)	Feel (1974)

Professional ratings
Review scores
Source	Rating
AllMusic	4/5 stars

Faces in Reflection is the third studio album by American keyboardist George Duke issued in 1974 on MPS Records. The album reached No. 31 on the Billboard Jazz Albums chart.

== Overview ==
Faces in Reflection was produced by Balhard G. Falk.

== Track listing ==
No.	Title	Writer(s)	Length
1.	"The Opening"	George Duke	3:19
2.	"Capricorn"	Duke, Rick Holmes	5:06
3.	"Piano Solo No. 1 & 2"	Duke	2:22
4.	"Psychosomatic Dung"	Duke	5:03
5.	"Faces in Reflection No. 1"	Duke	3:42
6.	"Maria Tres Filhos"	Fernando Brant, Milton Nascimento	5:09
7.	"North Beach"	Duke	6:19
8.	"Da Somba"	Duke	6:18
9.	"Faces in Reflection No. 2"	Duke	2:22

== Personnel ==
- George Duke – keyboards, pianos, vocals (2, 9)
- John Heard – bass
- Leon Ndugu Chancler – drums

=== Production ===
- Baldhard G. Falk – producer, photography
- Fred Borkgren – engineer
- Kerry McNabb – mixing
- Heinz Bähr – design
- Marcia Blackman – liner notes
