= Bruce Talamon =

American photographer

Bruce Wayne Talamon
- Born: 1949 (age 76–77)
- Occupation: Photographer
- Website: brucetalamon.com

Bruce Wayne Talamon (born 1949) is an American photographer. He is best known for photographing R&B and soul musicians during the 1970s and 1980s, and for his editorial work as a contract and stills photographer.

== Early life ==
Born in Los Angeles in 1949, Talamon was the first of two sons born to James and Clelie Talamon. He began high school in 1963 at the all-boys Catholic Verbum Dei High School. Talmon studied political science at Whittier College in California. While studying abroad in Berlin, Germany in 1970, he bought his first camera, an Asahi Pentax, and went on to photograph Miles Davis and Dexter Gordon with it in Copenhagen during his time abroad. After graduating in 1971 with a Bachelor of Arts in political science, he forwent attending law school and instead decided to pursue a career as a photographer.

== Career ==
=== R&B photography ===
After graduating from Whittier College, Talamon received an offer to work as a photographer at the 1972 Watts Festival in Los Angeles. Although he did not end up getting the job, he was able to secure a backstage pass, which allowed him the access needed to take pictures of some of the most notable R&B artists of that era. His photograph of Isaac Hayes was, according Talamon, "the first R&B photograph [he] ever took". It was also on that occasion that he met photographer Howard Bingham and, thanks to Bingham's introducing him to Soul Newspaper's owner Regina Jones, began working as a contributing photographer, and later, photo editor.

In 1974, Talamon expanded his client base to include Motown Records, his first corporate client. He was soon shooting publicity and editorial photographs for other record companies, including CBS Records. This same year, he also began working as a freelancer for Jet, Ebony, and Black Stars magazines. Over the span of his career, he shot such household names as Donna Summer, James Brown, Marvin Gaye, Bootsy Collins, and Chaka Khan.

=== Stills and editorial photography ===
Talamon started doing production stills photography in 1975. As a contract photographer for ABC Television, he worked on such shows as Laverne & Shirley, Taxi, American Bandstand, and Charlie's Angels and, in 1980, Don Cornelius hired him to be Soul Train’s stills photographer.

Talamon's first feature film working as a stills photographer was the 1982 Columbia Pictures feature Blue Thunder. He worked on projects at a number of major films studios over the next thirty years, including Staying Alive (1983), The Golden Child (1986), Beverly Hills Cop II (1987), Devil in a Blue Dress (1995), Space Jam (1996) and Larry Crowne (2011).

Talamon also worked as an editorial photographer for Time magazine. His first major assignment for the magazine was covering the 1984 American presidential primaries and the Reverend Jesse Jackson’s run for presidential candidacy. He would cover politics for Time once more during the 1988 Democratic primaries.

Since the mid-1990s, Talamon has been involved in the publication of several photography books and exhibitions featuring his work. These include his book Bob Marley: Spirit Dancer (1994), and Soul. R&B. Funk. Photographs 1972–1982 (2018).

In 2022 the Rock and Roll Hall of Fame had an exhibition of Talamon's photographs entitled Hotter Than July: The Bruce W. Talamon R&B Photographs. Talamon's work was included in the 2025 exhibition Photography and the Black Arts Movement, 1955–1985 at the National Gallery of Art. His work is in the collection of the Brooklyn Museum, the National Portrait Gallery, and the Studio Museum in Harlem.

== Personal life ==
Talamon has a son.
