= From Me to You (George Duke album) =

Studio album by George Duke
- Released: 1977
- Studio: Paramount Recording Studios (Los Angeles, California)
- Genres: Jazz fusion; jazz-funk
- Label: Epic
- Producer: George Duke

George Duke chronology
Live on Tour in Europe (1976)	From Me to You (1977)	Reach for It (1977)

Singles from From Me to You
- 1. "'Scuse Me Miss" Released: 1977

Professional ratings
Review scores
Source	Rating
AllMusic	3/5 stars

From Me to You is the tenth studio album by American keyboardist and record producer George Duke. It was released in 1977 through Epic Records, making it his debut release for the label. Recording sessions for the album took place at Paramount Recording Studios in Los Angeles, California. The album features contributions from several musicians, including vocalist Dianne Reeves, guitarist Michael Sembello, bassist Stanley Clarke, drummer Leon "Ndugu" Chancler, percussionist Emil Richards, saxophonist Ernie Watts, trombonist Glenn Ferris, trumpeter Bobby Bryant, cellist Ray Kelley and others.

Reaching a peak position of number 192 on the US Billboard 200, the album remained on the chart for a total of three weeks. The album spawned one single, "'Scuse Me Miss".

== Track listing ==
All tracks are written by George Duke, except for track 9 written with Leon Chancler, Michael Sembello and Stanley Clarke.

No.	Title	Length
1.	"From Me to You"	1:44
2.	"Carry On"	4:35
3.	"What Do They Really Fear?"	4:27
4.	"'Scuse Me Miss"	3:34
5.	"You and Me"	3:39
6.	"Broken Dreams"	2:47
7.	"Up On It"	9:02
8.	"Seasons"	5:45
9.	"Down In It"	1:21
10.	"Sing It"	4:07

== Personnel ==
- George Duke – vocals, keyboards, percussion (5), arrangements
- Michael Sembello – acoustic and electric guitar
- Stanley Clarke – acoustic bass (1, 8), electric bass (7, 9)
- Byron Lee Miller – electric bass (2–6, 10)
- Leon "Ndugu" Chancler – drums
- Emil Richards – percussion (1, 6, 8)
- Horn section (1, 2, 4, 7, 10)
  - Ernie Watts and Bill Green – saxophone, flute, piccolo flute
  - Bobby Brant and Walt Fowler – trumpet
  - Glenn Ferris and Lew McCreary – trombone
- String section (1, 5–7)
  - Murray Adler, William Kurasch, Jay Rosen, Polly Sweeney – violin
  - Pamela Goldsmith, Allan Harshman – viola
  - Raymond Kelley, Jacqueline Lustgarten – cello
- Lawrence Pecot Robinson, Debbie Robinson, Leslie Kearney, Dennis Moody, Darrell Cox, Bruce W. Talamon – handclaps
- Dianne Reeves – vocals (5, 6)
- Jessica Smith, Julia Tillman Waters, Maxine Willard Waters – backing vocals

=== Production ===
- George Duke – producer
- Kerry McNabb – engineer
- John Golden – mastering at Kendun Recorders (Burbank, California)
- Nancy Donald – design
- Cynthia Marsh – artwork
- Bruce W. Talamon – photography

== Chart history ==
Chart (1977)	Peak position
US Billboard 200	192
