= Dreamweaver (George Duke album) =

2013 album by George Duke

DreamWeaver

Studio album by George Duke
- Released: July 16, 2013
- Studio: Le Gonks West (Los Angeles, CA)
- Genre: Contemporary jazz; R&B
- Length: 1:14:03
- Label: BPM Records; Heads Up International
- Producer: George Duke

George Duke chronology
Deja Vu (2010)	DreamWeaver (2013)

Singles from DreamWeaver
- 1. "You Never Know" Released: 2013

Professional ratings
Review scores
Source	Rating
All About Jazz	4/5 stars
AllMusic	3.5/5 stars

DreamWeaver is a final studio album by American keyboardist and record producer George Duke. It was released on July 16, 2013 (20 days before his death), through Big Piano Music and Heads Up International. Recording sessions for the album took place at Le Gonks West in Los Angeles, California. The album is dedicated to Corine Duke, who died in 2011.

== Track listing ==
All tracks are written by George Duke except where noted.

No.	Title	Writer(s)	Length
1.	"Dreamweaver"		1:27
2.	"Stones of Orion"		6:27
3.	"Trippin'"		4:21
4.	"Ashtray"		4:00
5.	"Missing You"		5:45
6.	"Transition, Pt. 1"		0:14
7.	"Change the World"		5:54
8.	"Jazzmatazz"		4:44
9.	"Round the Way Girl"		4:11
10.	"Transition, Pt. 2"		0:17
11.	"Brown Sneakers"		6:10
12.	"You Never Know"		4:02
13.	"Ball & Chain"	Teena Marie	5:58
14.	"Burnt Sausage Jam"	George Duke; Jef Lee Johnson; Christian McBride; John Roberts	15:32
15.	"Happy Trails"	Dale Evans	5:01
Total length:			1:04:03

== Personnel ==
- George Duke – synthesizers (1–10, 12, 13, 14), Rhodes electric piano (2, 4, 7, 8, 9, 11, 12), acoustic piano (2, 5, 7, 8, 12, 14), vocals (3, 5, 7, 8, 12, 15), drum programming (3, 7, 8, 13, 15), keyboards (5), Minimoog (11, 15), ARP Odyssey (11), clavinet (14), Wurlitzer electric piano (15)
- Paul Jackson Jr. – guitars (4, 7, 11)
- Jef Lee Johnson – guitars (5, 9, 12, 14, 15)
- Michael Landau – guitars (8)
- Stanley Clarke – electric upright bass (2)
- Larry Kimpel – bass (5, 9, 12, 15)
- Michael Manson – bass (11)
- Christian McBride – bass (14)
- Gordon Campbell – drums (2, 4, 5, 9, 11, 12, 15)
- John Roberts – drums (14)
- Lenny Castro – percussion (11)
- Everette Harp – alto saxophone (2, 4, 8, 14)
- Kamasi Washington – tenor saxophone (2, 3, 4, 8, 13, 14)
- Dan Higgins – flute (2), tenor saxophone (4)
- Alan Kaplan – trombone (8, 14)
- Gary Grant – trumpet (2, 4)
- Michael "Patches" Stewart – trumpet (3, 8, 13, 14)
- Ramón Flores – trumpet (8)
- Terry Dexter – backing vocals (3, 8), vocals (7)
- Shannon Pearson – backing vocals (3)
- Lamont Van Hook – backing vocals (3, 5, 8, 12)
- Chris Clarke – voice (4)
- Rose Geddes – voice (4)
- Rachelle Ferrell – vocals (5)
- Jim Gilstrap – backing vocals (5, 12, 15), vocals (7)
- Kennedy Fuselier – vocals (7)
- Lalah Hathaway – vocals (7)
- Howard Hewett – vocals (7)
- Freddie Jackson – vocals (7)
- Jeffrey Osborne – vocals (7)
- Lori Perry – vocals (7), backing vocals (12, 15)
- Dira Sugandi – vocals (7)
- BeBe Winans – vocals (7)
- Josie James – backing vocals (8)
- Chill – rap vocals (8)
- Teena Marie – vocals (13)

Production

- George Duke – producer, arrangements, orchestration
- Erik Zobler – recording, mixing, mastering
- Lisa Chamblee Hampton – assistant engineer
- Randall Moses – art direction, design
- Toshihiro Sakurai – photography

== Chart history ==
Chart (2013)	Peak position
US Billboard 200	74
US Top Jazz Albums (Billboard)	2
