= Snapshot (George Duke album) =

Studio album by George Duke
- Released: September 25, 1992
- Studio: Le Gonks West (West Hollywood, California); Ocean Way Recording and Conway Studios (Hollywood, California); Mama Jo's (North Hollywood, California)
- Genre: Jazz-funk; R&B; jazz
- Length: 1:05:26
- Label: Warner Bros.
- Producer: George Duke

George Duke chronology
Night After Night (1989)	Snapshot (1992)	Illusions (1995)

Snapshot is a studio album by American keyboardist George Duke released in 1992 on Warner Bros Records. The album reached No. 1 on the Billboard Top Contemporary Jazz Albums chart and No. 36 on the Billboard Top R&B Albums chart.

== Background ==
Duke dedicated the album to his mother, Beatrice Burrell Duke, "who brought the camera and showed me how to use it".

== Critical reception ==
Professional ratings
Review scores
Source	Rating
AllMusic	3/5 stars
Chicago Tribune	3/4 stars
Entertainment Weekly	B

Mitchell May of the Chicago Tribune found that "This is a well-balanced trip into the jazz-fusion Duke has honed over the last two decades. Deftly mixing supple instrumentation with guest vocalists (Jeffrey Osborne, Deniece Williams, Keith Washington), Duke and a small army of sidemen provide plenty of jazz-inflected hooks.

Jonathan Widran of AllMusic wrote "With a several decade career as an artist and producer successfully spanning the realms of bebop, fusion, soul, and funk, nothing gives George Duke more pleasure than being able to go back to his basics as an acoustic jazz pianist on his smooth, multifaceted Warner Bros. debut, Snapshot. The keyboardist takes listeners on a whimsical, generally cool journey through the myriad styles he's purveyed over the years: Latin, pop, R&B, and live-in-the-studio jazz. Snapshot seems divided by Duke's pop sensibilities and these urges to simplify those electronic trappings." Widran added "overall, Snapshot nicely reflects the state of Duke circa early '90s smooth jazz. Cut through the chaff and the remaining wheat here represents an artist pretty much doing what he does best: a little bit of everything in a mostly artistically satisfying manner."

Josef Woodard of Entertainment Weekly exclaimed "R&B is the foundation of Snapshot‘s tracks, and soul stars such as Jeffrey Osborne and Deniece Williams serve up vocal cameos. But Duke’s harmonic savvy, as well as some crisp jazz riffs, keep this smooth, agreeable album from the numbskullduggery of its ”contemporary jazz” contemporaries."

Snapshot was also nominated for a Soul Train Award in the category of Best Jazz Album.

== Track listing ==
All tracks are written by George Duke, except where indicated.

Snapshot track listing
No.	Title	Writer(s)	Length
1.	"From the World" (Intro)		0:50
2.	"History (I Remember)"	Jeffrey Osborne	5:37
3.	"Snapshot"		5:39
4.	"No Rhyme, No Reason"		5:47
5.	"6 O'Clock"		4:37
6.	"Ooh Baby"		5:00
7.	"Fame"		5:45
8.	"Geneva"		5:27
9.	"Speak Low"		4:06
10.	"Keeping Love Alive"		5:44
11.	"Until Sunrise"		5:55
12.	"Bus Tours"		4:42
13.	"In the Meantime" (Interlude)		0:28
14.	"The Morning After"		5:49

== Personnel ==
Musicians

- George Duke – Roland D-550, Synclavier (1, 3–10, 14), Ensoniq VFX (1–9), Korg M1 (1–10, 12–14), PPG Wave (1–4, 6–8, 13), acoustic piano (2–4, 8, 12), Yamaha TX816 (2, 6, 9–12, 14), Minimoog bass (2, 4, 6, 7), Akai S1000 (3, 5, 6), Fender Rhodes (5, 8), Minimoog lead (6), Memorymoog (10, 11)
- Paul Jackson Jr. – guitars (2, 5, 8, 9), acoustic guitar (12), electric guitar (12)
- Ray Fuller – guitars (3, 4)
- Charles Foster Johnson – guitars (10)
- Larry Kimpel – bass (5, 8, 9, 12)
- Byron Miller – bass (10, 11)
- Dennis Chambers – drums (5, 8, 9, 12)
- Leon Ndugu Chancler – drums (10, 11)
- Airto Moreira – percussion (8, 12)
- Sheila E. – percussion (9, 10), congas (12)
- Paulinho da Costa – percussion (11)
- Larry Williams – alto saxophone (7)
- Everette Harp – alto saxophone (12)
- George Howard – soprano saxophone (14)
- Hubert Laws – flute (8)
- Reggie Young – trombone (7)
- Gary Grant – trumpet (7)
- Jerry Hey – trumpet (7)
- Oscar Brashear – trumpet (12)

Vocalists

- Jim Gilstrap – backing vocals (2, 4, 7, 9)
- Jeffrey Osborne – backing vocals (2), vocal arrangements (2), vocals (7)
- Lori Perry – backing vocals (2), vocals (7)
- Chanté Moore – model (3), vocals (7), backing vocals (8)
- Bobby Holland – photographer (3)
- George Duke – lead vocals (4, 10), backing vocals (4, 7, 8), vocals (5, 7), all vocals (6)
- Rachelle Ferrell – backing vocals (4, 7)
- Phil Perry – vocals (5, 7), backing vocals (8–10)
- Philip Bailey – vocals (7)
- Howard Hewett – vocals (7)
- Keith Washington – vocals (7)
- Deniece Williams – vocals (7)
- Lynn Davis – backing vocals (9, 10)
- Angel Rogers – backing vocals (9, 10)
- Alex Brown – backing vocals (14)
- Carl Carwell – backing vocals (14)
- Marcy Levy – backing vocals (14)

=== Production ===
- George Duke – producer, arrangements
- Erik Zobler – recording, mixing
- Steve Ford – assistant engineer
- Wayne Holmes – assistant engineer
- Gil Morales – assistant engineer
- Marnie Riley – assistant engineer
- Brett Swain – assistant engineer
- Brian Gardner – mastering at Bernie Grundman Mastering (Hollywood, California)
- Faith R. Fox – production coordinator
- Caroline Balog – art direction, design
- Ecco – photography
- Thomas Wells – wardrobe
- André – hair stylist
- Lalette Littlejohn – make-up
- Herb Cohen – management
