= I Love the Blues, She Heard My Cry =

Album by George Duke

Studio album by George Duke
- Released: 1975
- Recorded: 1975
- Studio: Paramount Recording Studios (Hollywood, California)
- Genre: Jazz fusion
- Length: 40:43
- Label: MPS; BASF
- Producer: George Duke

George Duke chronology
The Aura Will Prevail (1975)	I Love the Blues, She Heard My Cry (1975)	Liberated Fantasies (1976)

I Love the Blues, She Heard My Cry is the seventh studio album by American keyboardist George Duke released in 1975 on MPS Records. The album peaked at number 169 on the US Billboard 200 and No. 36 on the US Top Soul Albums chart.

== Background ==
I Love the Blues, She Heard My Cry was recorded at Paramount Recording Studios in Hollywood, California. The album features guest artists like Leon "Ndugu" Chancler, Airto Moreira and Flora Purim, Bruce Fowler, Tom Fowler, Ruth Underwood and Emil Richards. Artists such as Lee Ritenour, Daryl Stuermer, Johnny "Guitar" Watson also appeared on the album.

Duke made use of ARP and Moog synthesizers, Rhodes electric piano, Hohner clavinet and Mutron Phasers on this record. On both "Look into Her Eyes" and "That's What She Said", Brazilian musician Aitro Moreira played bongo drums, tambourine, berimbau, horse bell and gourd cabasa. I Love the Blues, She Heard My Cry is also dedicated to the memory of the late Julian "Cannonball" Adderley.

== Critical reception ==
Professional ratings
Review scores
Source	Rating
AllMusic	4/5 stars

Alex Henderson of AllMusic noted that "I Love the Blues, She Heard My Cry isn't recommended to those who only want to hear Duke as an instrumentalist, although it's enjoyable if you like hearing some rock, soul, and blues singing along with your fusion."

== Track listing ==
No.	Title	Writer(s)	Length
1.	"Chariot"	George Duke	3:01
2.	"Look into Her Eyes"	George Duke	3:26
3.	"Sister Serene"	Leon Chancler	4:34
4.	"That's What She Said"	George Duke	4:31
5.	"Mashayu"	Emil Richards	1:51
6.	"Rokkinrowl, I Don't Know"	George Duke	3:28
7.	"Prepare Yourself"	George Duke	5:29
8.	"Giant Child Within Us – Ego"	George Duke	6:39
9.	"Someday"	George Duke	2:41
10.	"I Love the Blues, She Heard My Cry" (featuring Johnny "Guitar" Watson)	George Duke	5:28
Total length:			40:43

== Personnel ==
- George Duke – synthesizer, Mutron Phasers, Rhodes electric piano, clavinet, vocals (tracks: 1, 2, 6, 7, 9, 10), producer
- Flora Purim – vocals (track 2)
- John Watson – vocals & guitar (track 10)
- Lee Ritenour – guitar (tracks: 1, 6)
- George Johnson – guitar (tracks: 2, 7, 8)
- Daryl Stuermer – guitar (track 4)
- Byron Lee Miller – bass (tracks: 2–4, 7), guitar (track 4)
- Tom Fowler – bass (tracks: 1, 6)
- Leon "Ndugu" Chancler – drums (tracks: 1–4, 6–9), gong (track 8), backing vocals (track 10)
- Airto Moreira – percussion (tracks: 2, 4)
- Emil Richards – marimba (track 4), percussion (track 5)
- Ruth Underwood – marimba & gong (track 8)
- John Wittenberg – violin (tracks: 4, 8)
- Bruce Fowler – trombone (track 8)
- Janet Ferguson Hoff – backing vocals (track 6)
- Pat Norris – backing vocals (track 10)
- Debra Fay – backing vocals (track 10)
- Chris Norris – backing vocals (track 10)
- Donna Correa – backing vocals (track 10)
- Larry Robinson – backing vocals (track 10)
- Roger Dollarhide – backing vocals (track 10)
- Kerry McNabb – recording
- Baldhard G. Falk – artwork, photography, executive producer

== Chart history ==
Chart (1975)	Peak position
US Billboard 200	169
US Top R&B/Hip-Hop Albums (Billboard)	36
