= Feel (George Duke album) =

Studio album by George Duke
- Released: October 28, 1974
- Recorded: May 1974
- Studio: Paramount Studios (Hollywood, California)
- Genre: Jazz-funk; jazz fusion
- Length: 41:36
- Label: MPS; BASF
- Producer: Baldhard G. Falk

George Duke chronology
Faces in Reflection (1974)	Feel (1974)	The Aura Will Prevail (1975)

Feel is the fourth studio album by the American keyboard player George Duke, released on October 28, 1974, by MPS Records. The album reached No. 17 on the Billboard Top Jazz Albums chart.

== Overview ==
Duke began experimenting with synthesizer orchestration on this album, which is considered the beginning of his unique style. The album has contributions from Flora Purim, Frank Zappa, John Heard, Airto Moreira and Leon "Ndugu" Chancler.

== Critical reception ==
Professional ratings
Review scores
Source	Rating
AllMusic	4/5 stars

Jason Elias of AllMusic found, "Although this would be the third album under his name, Feel's eclectic mix of fusion and rock is his debut in the genre of which he'd later become a leader... Feel proves that, even at this relatively early stage, Duke's intelligent ear for melodies and his keyboard prowess set him apart from his contemporaries."

== Track listing ==
All tracks are written by Duke, except for track 3 written by Leon Chancler.

No.	Title	Length
1.	"Funny Funk"	5:18
2.	"Love"	6:06
3.	"The Once Over"	4:41
4.	"Feel"	5:40
5.	"Cora Jobege"	3:50
6.	"Old Slippers"	5:41
7.	"Theme from the Opera "Tzina""	2:00
8.	"Yana Aminah"	4:33
9.	"Rashid"	3:36
10.	"Statement"	1:15
Total length:		41:36

== Personnel ==
- George Duke – keyboards, bass synthesizer (1, 5, 9), vocals (2, 4, 10)
- Obdewl'l X (aka Frank Zappa) – guitar (2, 6)
- John Heard – acoustic bass and electric bass (2, 3, 4, 5, 6, 7)
- Leon "Ndugu" Chancler – drums, percussion (3)
- Airto Moreira – percussion (2, 3, 4, 8, 10)
- Flora Purim – vocals (2, 8)

=== Production ===
- Baldhard G. Falk – producer, back cover photography
- Kerry McNabb – recording, mixing
- Wilfried "Sätty" Podriech – cover art

== Charts ==
Chart (1974)	Peak position
Billboard Top Jazz Albums	17
Billboard 200	141
