= The Aura Will Prevail =

Album by George Duke

Studio album by George Duke
- Released: 1975
- Studio: Paramount Recording Studios (Hollywood, California)
- Genre: Jazz-funk; jazz fusion
- Label: MPS; BASF
- Producer: Baldhard G. Falk

George Duke chronology
Feel (1974)	The Aura Will Prevail (1975)	I Love the Blues, She Heard My Cry (1975)

Professional ratings
Review scores
Source	Rating
AllMusic	4.5/5 stars

The Aura Will Prevail is the fifth studio album by American keyboardist George Duke. It was released in 1975 through MPS Records. The recording sessions took place at Paramount Recording Studios in Hollywood, California. The album features contributions from Alphonso Johnson, Leon "Ndugu" Chancler and Airto Moreira.

Duke played various keyboard instruments on the album, including Rhodes electric piano, Wurlitzer electric piano, Hohner clavinet, ARP Odyssey, ARP String Ensemble, Mutron Phaser, Mutron Dual Phaser, Minimoog, Moog bass and various pedalboards.

Reaching a peak position of number 111 on the US Billboard 200, the album remained on the chart for a total of ten weeks.

== Track listing ==
No.	Title	Writer(s)	Length
1.	"Dawn"	George Duke	4:54
2.	"For Love (I Come Your Friend)"	George Duke	4:34
3.	"Foosh"	George Duke	3:08
4.	"Floop De Loop"	George Duke	6:43
5.	"Malibu"	George Duke	4:07
6.	"Fools"	George Duke	4:29
7.	"Echidna's Arf"	Frank Zappa	3:33
8.	"Uncle Remus"	Frank Zappa; George Duke	5:09
9.	"The Aura"	George Duke	1:26

== Personnel ==
- George Duke – vocals, moog bass (tracks: 3, 7), Rhodes electric piano, Wurlitzer electric piano, clavinet, synthesizer (ARP Odyssey, minimoog, ARP String Ensemble), pedalboard
- Alphonso Johnson – electric bass (tracks: 1–2, 4–6, 8–9)
- Leon "Ndugu" Chancler – voice (track 2), vocals (track 5), drums, congas
- Airto Moreira – percussion (tracks: 1, 5)
- Gee Janzen – vocals (track 5)
- Kathy Woehrle – vocals (track 5)
- Sylvia St. James – vocals (track 5)

Technical

- Baldhard G. Falk – producer, photography
- Kerry McNabb – mixing & recording
- Wilfried "Sätty" Podriech – design

== Chart history ==
Chart (1975)	Peak position
US Billboard 200	111
