= Face the Music (George Duke album) =

Studio album by George Duke
- Released: September 3, 2002
- Recorded: 2002
- Studio: Le Gonks, Los Angeles, CA
- Genre: Jazz
- Length: 1:10:52
- Label: Big Piano Music
- Producer: George Duke

George Duke chronology
Cool (2000)	Face the Music (2002)	Duke (2005)

Professional ratings
Review scores
Source	Rating
AllMusic	4/5 stars

Face the Music is the 26th studio album by American jazz musician George Duke. The album peaked at No. 4 on the Billboard Top Contemporary Jazz Albums chart and No. 7 on the Billboard Top Jazz Albums chart. It reached No. 24 on the Billboard Top Independent Albums chart.

== Critical reception ==
Lucy Tauss of JazzTimes favourably found "Keyboardist/producer George Duke inaugurates his new label, Big Piano Music, with Face the Music, an album filled with zesty, free-spirited, funk-fusion jams."

The Associated Press praised the album saying, "Duke, whose career spans nearly four decades, has a knack for timeless music, combining jazz, Brazilian jazz, funk R&B, even some gospel. Here, he enlists upright bass impresario Christian McBride, guitarist Jef Lee Johnson, drummer John "Lil' John" Roberts and Lenny Castro on percussion to accentuate his crisp, jazz-funk piano compositions. The entire disc is a winner..."

Buddy Blue of the San Diego Union-Tribune named Face the Music as one of his albums of the year.

== Track listing ==
No.	Title	Writer(s)	Length
1.	"The Black Messiah, Pt. 2"	George Duke	8:22
2.	"Chillin'"	George Duke	5:36
3.	"My Piano"	George Duke	7:26
4.	"Guess You're Not the One"	George Duke	7:28
5.	"Let's Roll"	George Duke	8:14
6.	"Ain't It Funky Now"	James Brown	4:20
7.	"Close to You" (featuring Kirk Whalum)	George Duke	5:52
8.	"Another Way to Look at It"	George Duke	7:17
9.	"Creepin'"	George Duke	4:50
10.	"Ten Mile Jog"	George Duke, Jef Lee Johnson, John Roberts	11:27

== Personnel ==
- George Duke – keyboards
- Jef Lee Johnson – acoustic guitars, electric guitars
- Christian McBride – bass
- Little John Roberts – drums
- Lenny Castro – percussion
- Everette Harp – alto saxophone
- Dan Higgins – tenor saxophone
- Kirk Whalum – saxophone (7)
- Isaac Smith – trombone
- Oscar Brasher – trumpet, flugelhorn
- Jim Gilstrap – backing vocals
- Kenya Hathaway – backing vocals
- Wayne Holmes – backing vocals
- Lori Perry – backing vocals

Production

- George Duke – producer
- Erik Zobler – recording, mixing
- Stefeniah McGowan – assistant engineer
- Wayne Holmes – technical matters
- Doug Sax – mastering
- Robert Hadley – mastering
- The Mastering Lab (Hollywood, California) – mastering location
- Corine Duke – production coordinator
- Bobby Holland – band photography
- Jeff Lyons – art direction, all other photography
- James Goodlow – hair stylist
- Lalette Littlejohn – make-up
- Herb Cohen for Consolidated Productions – management
