= What Goes Around Comes Around (George Duke song) =

Single by George Duke

from the album Déjà Vu
- Released: 2010
- Genre: Jazz
- Length: 3:46
- Label: Heads Up International
- Songwriter(s): George Duke
- Producer(s): George Duke

George Duke singles chronology
"The Total Experience (Boney James featuring George Duke)" (2006)	"What Goes Around Comes Around" (2010)	"You Never Know" (2013)

"What Goes Around Comes Around" is a song by American musician George Duke, released as a single in 2010 by Heads Up International. The song reached No. 26 on the US Billboard Smooth Jazz Songs chart.

== Overview ==
"What Goes Around Comes Around" was composed and produced by George Duke. The song appears on Duke's 2010 studio album Déjà Vu.

== Critical reception ==
Thom Jurek of AllMusic wrote "What Goes Around Comes Around" features some nice piano, an excellent vocal through a synth, and a gorgeous Everette Harp soprano solo."

== Charts ==
Chart (2010)	Peak position
US Smooth Jazz Songs (Billboard)	26
