= Liberated Fantasies =

1976 studio album by George Duke

Studio album by George Duke
- Released: 1976
- Recorded: 1976
- Studios: Paramount Recording Studios (Hollywood, California)
- Genres: Jazz fusion; crossover jazz
- Length: 39:49
- Labels: MPS; BASF
- Producer: George Duke

George Duke chronology
I Love the Blues, She Heard My Cry (1975)	Liberated Fantasies (1976)	The 1976 Solo Keyboard Album (Note: Recorded in 1976. Released in Europe titled "The Dream" by MPS in 1978. Released in the USA (in a slightly different version) as "The 1976 Solo Keyboard Album" by Epic in 1982.) (1976)

Professional ratings
Review scores
Source	Rating
AllMusic	3.5/5 stars

Liberated Fantasies is the eighth studio album by American keyboardist George Duke. It was recorded and mixed by Kerry McNabb at Paramount Recording Studios in Hollywood, California in 1976 and released through MPS Records, making it Duke's seventh and final album for the label. The album features contributions from Alphonso Johnson and Leon "Ndugu" Chancler with guest appearances from several musicians, including vocalist Napoleon Murphy Brock, guitarist Daryl Stuermer, percussionists Airto Moreira and Emil Richards.

Reaching a peak position of number 190 on the US Billboard 200, the album remained on the chart for a total of two weeks.

== Track listing ==
No.	Title	Writer(s)	Length
1.	"Don't Be Shy"	George Duke; Susan Reed	3:00
2.	"Seeing You"	George Duke	4:29
3.	"Back to Where We Never Left"	George Duke; Leon Chancler	6:27
4.	"What the..."	George Duke	0:32
5.	"Tryin' & Cryin'" (featuring Napoleon Murphy Brock)	George Duke	5:46
6.	"I C'n Hear That"	George Duke; Leon Chancler; Alphonso Johnson; Airto Moreira	5:17
7.	"After the Love"	George Duke	2:31
8.	"Tzina"	George Duke	2:29
9.	"Liberated Fantasies"	George Duke	9:22
Total length:			39:49

== Personnel ==
- George Duke – vocals, keyboards, synthesizers
- George Johnson – guitars (1)
- Daryl Stuermer – guitars (5, 9)
- David Amaro – acoustic guitar (7)
- Alphonso Johnson – bass
- Leon "Ndugu" Chancler – drums, rototoms, vocals (9)
- Airto Moreira – percussion (6, 7, 9)
- Emil Richards – marimba (6)
- Napoleon Murphy Brock – backing vocals (2, 9), lead vocals (5)
- Janet Ferguson Hoff – backing vocals (2, 4)
- Rashid Duke – vocals (4)
- Ruth Komanoff – backing vocals (4)
- Bonnie Bowdon Amaro – vocals (7, 9)

Production

- Baldhard G. Falk – executive producer
- George Duke – producer
- Kerry McNabb – mixing, recording
- Cal Schenkel – design, photography

== Chart history ==
Chart (1976)	Peak position
US Billboard 200	190
