= Rachelle Ferrell =

American vocalist and musician

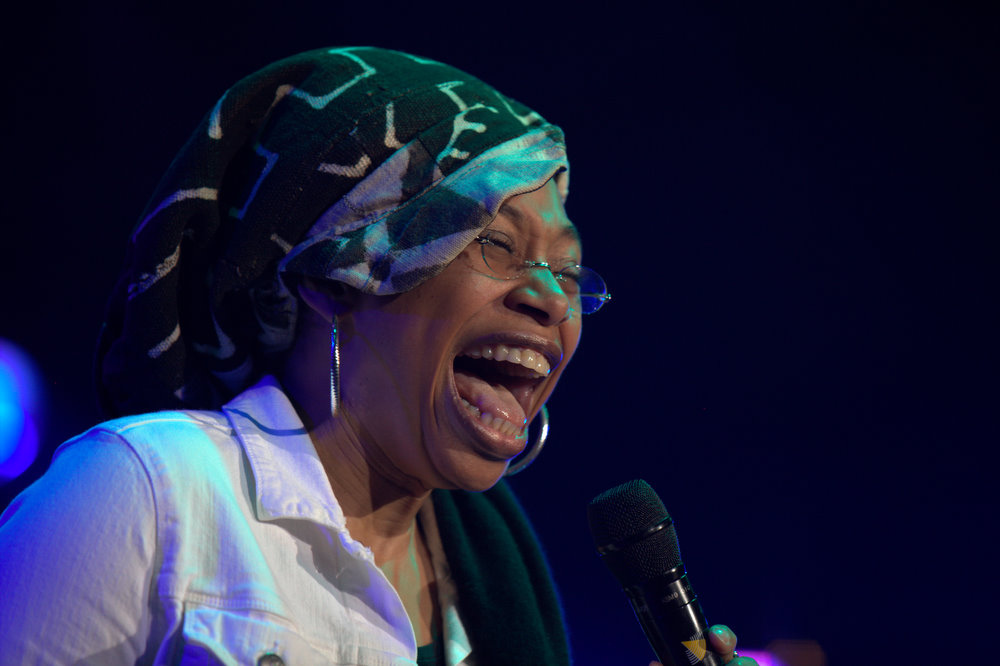
- Ferrell in a performance on June 6, 2011

Background information
- Born: Rachelle Stephanie Ferrell; May 21, 1961 (age 65); Berwyn, Pennsylvania, U.S.
- Genres: R&B; pop rock; jazz fusion; neo soul; pop; classical
- Occupations: Singer; songwriter; record producer; pianist
- Instruments: Vocals; piano; guitar
- Years active: 1974–present
- Labels: Capitol; Blue Note
- Website: rachelleferrell.com

Rachelle Ferrell (born May 21, 1961) is an American vocalist and musician. Although she has had some success in the mainstream R&B, pop, gospel and classical music scenes, she is noted for her talents as a contemporary jazz singer. In contemporary jazz she is noted for her delivery, control, range, improvisational vocal percussion, scatting ability and access to the whistle register.

== Early life ==
Ferrell began singing at age six. She also received classical training in violin and the piano at an early age. During her teenage years, she performed as a professional musician. She began performing at age 13 as a violinist, and in her mid-teens as a pianist and vocalist. After enrolling in the Berklee College of Music, she graduated a year later and secured a position teaching music for the New Jersey State Council on the Arts.

== Career ==
=== 1975–1988: Backup singing ===
From 1975 to 1990, Ferrell sang backup for Lou Rawls, Patti LaBelle, and Vanessa Williams. In 1988, she began touring as a backup vocalist for Phyllis Hyman. In the same year, she also appeared as backup vocalist on Miles Jaye's song "Desiree".

=== 1989–1997: First Instrument and Rachelle Ferrell ===
In 1989, Ferrell secured her own recording contract with Capitol Records. In 1990, Ferrell released her first album, First Instrument, exclusively in Japan. The album contained cover versions of jazz standards.

In September 1992, she released her second album Rachelle Ferrell. The album spawned the singles "Til You Come Back to Me", "Welcome to My Love", "Nothing Has Ever Felt Like This", and "With Open Arms". The album received a gold-status music recording certification. In the same year, she appeared on George Duke's album Snapshot. In 1993, Ferrell headlined her own tour and performed several jazz festivals. In 1995, Ferrell released her album First Instrument in the USA.

From 1995 to 1997, Ferrell toured as part of the George Duke Band. The group released a concert film titled Live at Montreux, which highlighted their concert set during the Montreux Jazz Festival in 1997. Ferrell also appeared as a backing vocalist on his albums Illusions (1995) and Is Love Enough? (1997).

=== 2000–2002: Individuality (Can I Be Me?) ===
In August 2000, Ferrell released third album Individuality (Can I Be Me?). The album peaked at number 1 on Billboard's Top Jazz Albums chart and sold over 160,000 copies. The album's singles "I Forgive You" and "Satisfied" both charted in the top twenty on the Adult R&B Songs chart. In 2001, Ferrell headlined her own tour to support the album. In April 2002, she released her live album Live in Montreux 91–97.

=== 2006–present: Recent activity ===
In 2006, Ferrell released a song titled "Wounds in the Way" on the Madea's Family Reunion soundtrack. In 2008, she appeared George Duke's Dukey Treats album. In 2014, Ferrell performed at the Capital Jazz Festival. In 2018, she performed during the Phyllis Hyman tribute at the Capital Jazz Festival. Ferrell also confirmed that she was recording her forthcoming album The Art and Soul of Rachelle Ferrell.

== Vocal ability ==
Ferrell has a six octave vocal range. Her range also includes the ability to sing and enunciate in the whistle register. Ferrell's highest notes in "It Only Took A Minute" (1992) have been described as "Minnie Riperton-like wailing."

== Personal life ==
In 1992, Ferrell filed a lawsuit against a production company, which was settled out of court in 2000.

In August 2023, Ferrell's management and website released a statement that Ferrell was experiencing "health, wellness, and life-related hardships".

== Discography ==
=== Albums ===
Year	Album	Peak chart positions					Certifications
Year	Album	US Pop	US R&B/HH	US Jazz	US Traditional Jazz	US Heat	Certifications
1990	First Instrument: 1st studio album; Released: June 19, 1990	151	—	3	—	—	
1992	Rachelle Ferrell: 2nd studio album; Released: September 12, 1992	161	25	—	—	4	RIAA: Gold
2000	Individuality (Can I Be Me?): 3rd studio album; Released: August 15, 2000	71	16	1	—	—	
2002	Live in Montreux 91–97: 1st live album; Released: April 9, 2002	—	—	26	8	—	

=== Singles ===
Year	Title	Peak chart positions				Album
Year	Title	US R&B/HH	US R&B/HH Airplay	US AC	US Adult R&B	Album
1992	"'Til You Come Back to Me"	19	45	—	—	Rachelle Ferrell
1993	"Welcome To My Love"	42	41	25	—	Rachelle Ferrell
1993	"Nothing Has Ever Felt Like This" (featuring Will Downing)	72	72	—	25	Rachelle Ferrell
1994	"With Open Arms"	68	61	—	—	Rachelle Ferrell
2000	"Satisfied"	—	—	—	11	Individuality (Can I Be Me?)
2000	"I Forgive You"	—	—	—	13	Individuality (Can I Be Me?)
