= The Fabulous Counts =

American soul and funk group

The Fabulous Counts were an American soul/funk group from Detroit, Michigan. They won local acclaim as an instrumental group and as a backing ensemble for visiting solo acts after their formation in 1968. Working with producer Richard "Popcorn" Wylie, they released the instrumental single "Jan, Jan" on Detroit's Moira Records that year, which narrowly missed hitting the US R&B charts that winter. Their second single, "Dirty Red", passed without trace, but the third single, "Get Down People", hit #32 R&B and #88 on the US pop charts. A full-length, Jan, Jan (produced by Ollie McLaughlin), was released in 1969 on Cotillion Records, but the group left the label in 1970.

Signing with Westbound Records that year, the group changed their name simply to The Counts. Shortchanged by Westbound Records in favor of The Ohio Players and Funkadelic, many of the band's original members left, and the band moved to Atlanta, Georgia, signing with Michael Thevis' Aware Records, where they released their final LPs Love Sign and Funk Pump before the group called it quits in 1976. All three of the funk albums they released under their new name charted.

The band's biggest hit came in 1972 under a pseudonym: "Mr. Penguin - Pt. 1" by Lunar Funk, recorded and released on Bell Records while they were still signed to Westbound. It reached #29 R&B and #63 on the Hot 100. Their album that year, What's Up Front That - Counts, reached No. 193 in the US.

Mose Davis pursued a solo career, releasing an album called The Coming of Moses on Pure Silk Records in 1978.

Just before reuniting in 2009, Mose Davis played jazz piano around Atlanta with the Mose Davis Trio, Leroy Emmanuel played in a Canadian funk band called the LMT Connection and Demo Cates operated out of Canada, where he received two Juno Award nominations for R&B/Soul Recording of the Year and appeared as an actor in TV and movies.

In 2009, they reunited with the line-up from 1976: Mose Davis (Hammond organ, vocals), Leroy Emmanuel (guitar, vocals), Demo Cates (saxes, vocals), Jimmy "Junebug" Jackson (drums, vocals) and Jimmy Brown (saxes, vocals).

The band's Cotillion LP has been reissued, and the first Westbound LP is also in print as a CD.

== Members ==
The Fabulous Counts

- Mose Davis - keyboards
- Leroy Emmanuel - guitar
- Demo Cates - alto saxophone
- Jim White - tenor saxophone
- Raoul Keith Mangrum - drums

The Counts

- Mose Davis - keyboards, vocals
- Leroy Emmanuel - guitar, vocals
- Demo Cates - alto saxophone, vocals
- Jimmy Jackson - drums, vocals
- Jimmy Brown - saxophone, vocals

== Discography ==
The Fabulous Counts

- Jan, Jan (Cotillion Records, 1969)
- Rhythm Changes (Westbound Records, 1971)

The Counts

- What's Up Front That Counts (Westbound Records, 1971) US #193, US Black Albums #35
- Love Signs (Aware Records, 1973) US Black Albums #45
- Funk Pump (Aware Records, 1975) US Black Albums #58
- Golden Classics (Collectables, 1993)
- It's What's In The Groove (Southbound Records, 1996)
