= George Duke =

American musician (1946–2013)

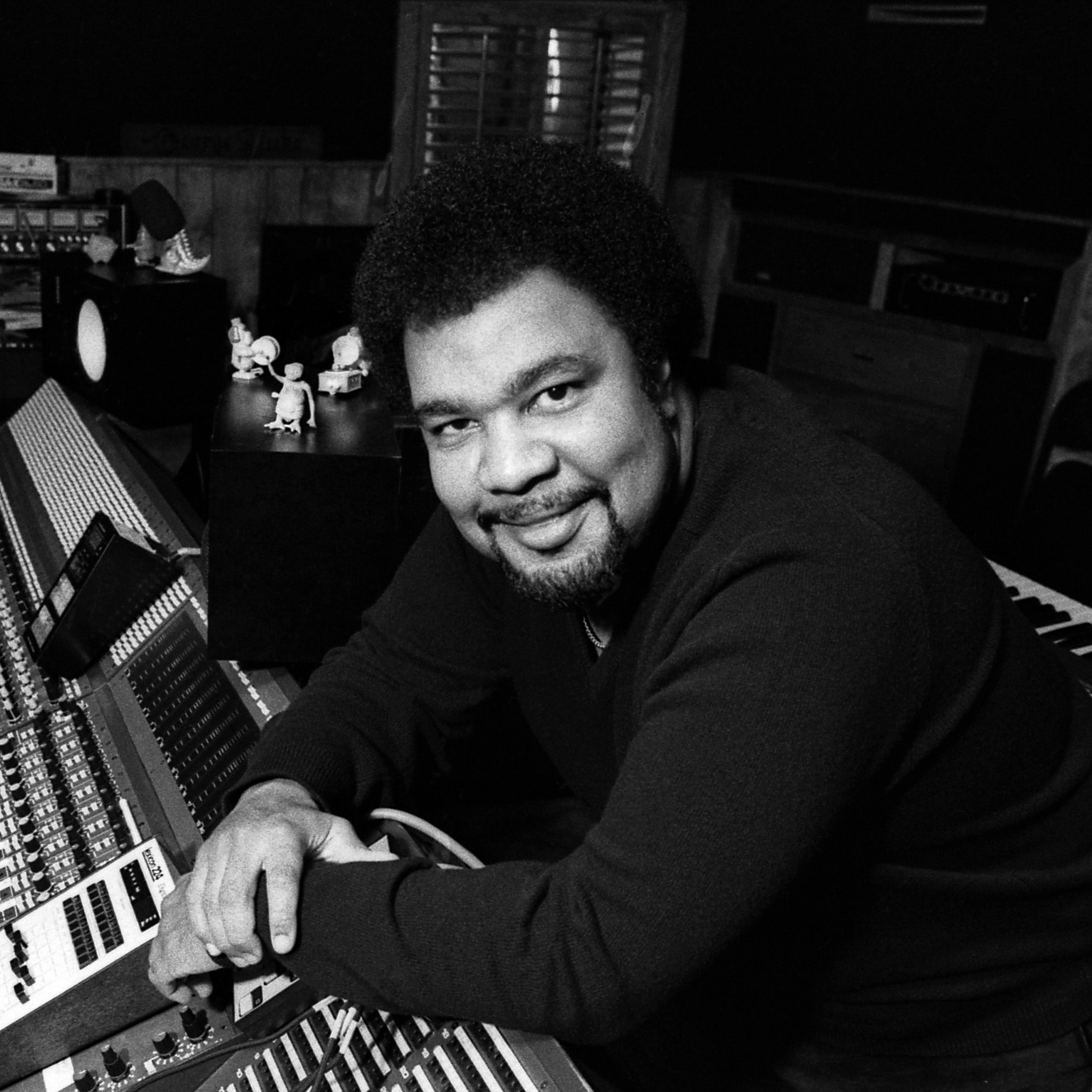
- Duke in 1984

Background information
- Born: January 12, 1946; San Rafael, California, U.S.
- Died: August 5, 2013 (aged 67) Los Angeles, California, U.S.
- Genres: Jazz fusion; crossover jazz; funk; jazz funk; jazz rock; post-disco; smooth jazz
- Occupations: Musician, composer, musical director, producer, educator
- Instruments: Vocals, keyboards, keytar
- Years active: 1966–2013
- Labels: Pacific Jazz; IBis Recordings; Pickwick; MPS; SABA; Atlantic; Epic; Elektra; Warner Bros.; Bizarre World; Telarc Jazz; Heads Up
- Website: georgeduke.com

George Martin Duke (January 12, 1946 – August 5, 2013) was an American keyboardist, composer, singer-songwriter and record producer. He worked with numerous artists as arranger, music director, writer and co-writer, record producer and as a professor of music. He first made a name for himself with the album The Jean-Luc Ponty Experience with the George Duke Trio. He is known for his 32 solo albums, as well as for his collaborations with other musicians like Stanley Clarke and (his cousin) Dianne Reeves, but particularly with composer, guitarist and bandleader Frank Zappa.

== Biography ==
George Martin Duke was born in San Rafael, California, United States, to Thadd Duke and Beatrice Burrell, and was raised in Marin City (CA). At four years of age, he became interested in the piano. His mother took him to see Duke Ellington in concert and told him about this experience. "I don't remember it too well, but my mother told me I went crazy. I ran around saying 'Get me a piano, get me a piano!'" He began his formal piano studies at the age of seven at a local Baptist church.

He attended Tamalpais High School in Mill Valley (CA) before earning a bachelor's degree in trombone and composition, with a minor in contrabass, from the San Francisco Conservatory of Music in 1967. He earned a master's degree in composition from San Francisco State University in 1975.

Although Duke started playing classical music, he credited his cousin Charles Burrell for convincing him to switch to jazz. He explained that he "wanted to be free" and Burrell "more or less made the decision for me" by convincing him to "improvise and do what you want to do". He taught a course on jazz and American culture at Merritt College in Oakland.

Duke recorded his first album in 1966. His second was with French violinist Jean-Luc Ponty, with whom he performed in San Francisco. After Frank Zappa and Cannonball Adderley heard him play, both invited him to join their bands. He spent two years with Zappa as a member of The Mothers of Invention, two years with Adderley, then returned to Zappa. Zappa, who never played or recorded other than for his own projects, played guitar solos on Duke's album Feel (1974), after Duke joined him on nine of his albums and toured with the Mothers. In 1975 he recorded with his original drummer Pete Magadini the album Polyrhythm on Ibis Recordings. He recorded I Love the Blues, She Heard My Cry with Zappa's bandmates Ruth Underwood, Tom Fowler, and Bruce Fowler and jazz guitarist Lee Ritenour.

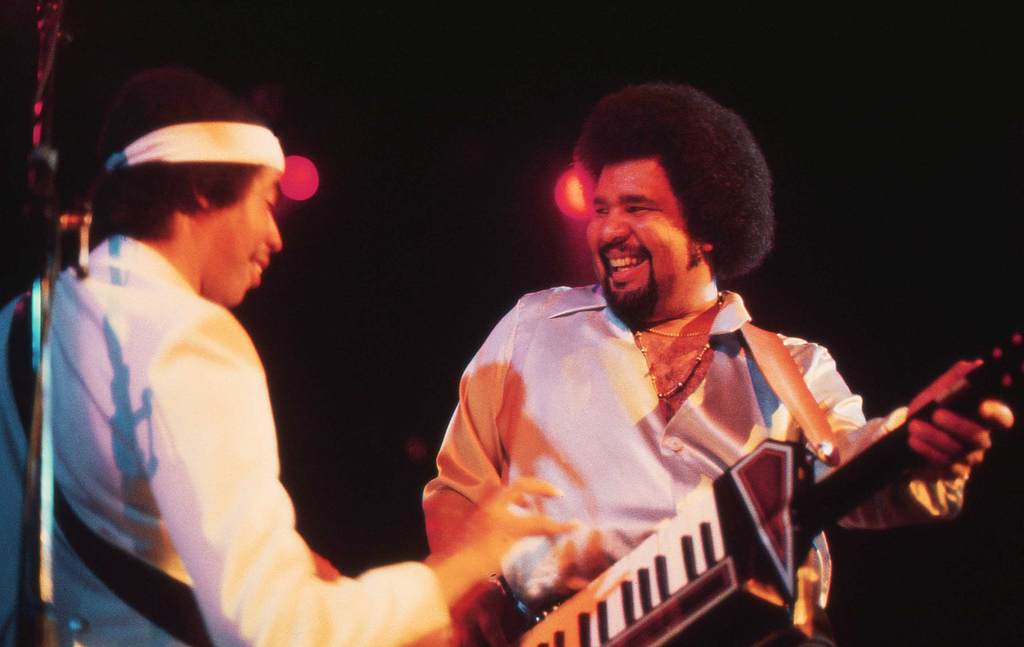
Duke in concert with Stanley Clarke, 1981

Duke occasionally recorded under the name Dawilli Gonga, possibly for contractual reasons, when appearing on other artists' albums.

In 1977, Duke fused jazz with pop, funk, and soul music on his album From Me to You. Later, that same year, his album Reach for It entered the pop charts, and his audiences increased. In 1981, he began a collaboration with bassist Stanley Clarke that would last through the 1980s, which combined pop, jazz, funk, and R&B. Their first album contained the single "Sweet Baby", which became a Top 20 pop hit, reaching Number 19 on the Billboard Magazine Hot 100 and Number 6 on the R&B charts.

During the 1980s, Duke's career moved to a second phase as he spent much of his time as a record producer. He produced pop and R&B hits for A Taste of Honey, Jeffrey Osborne, and Deniece Williams. His clients included Anita Baker, Rachelle Ferrell, Everette Harp, Gladys Knight, Melissa Manchester, Barry Manilow, The Pointer Sisters, Smokey Robinson, Seawind, and Take 6.

Duke worked as musical director at the 1988 Nelson Mandela 70th Birthday Tribute concert at Wembley Stadium in London. In 1989, he temporarily replaced Marcus Miller as musical director of NBC's late-night music performance program Sunday Night during its first season. He was a judge for the second annual Independent Music Awards (AIM).

Duke died on August 5, 2013 in Los Angeles, at the age of 67 from chronic lymphocytic leukemia.

== Awards and honors ==
=== Grammy awards ===
The Grammy Awards are awarded annually by the National Academy of Recording Arts and Sciences. Duke has received two awards out of nine nominations.

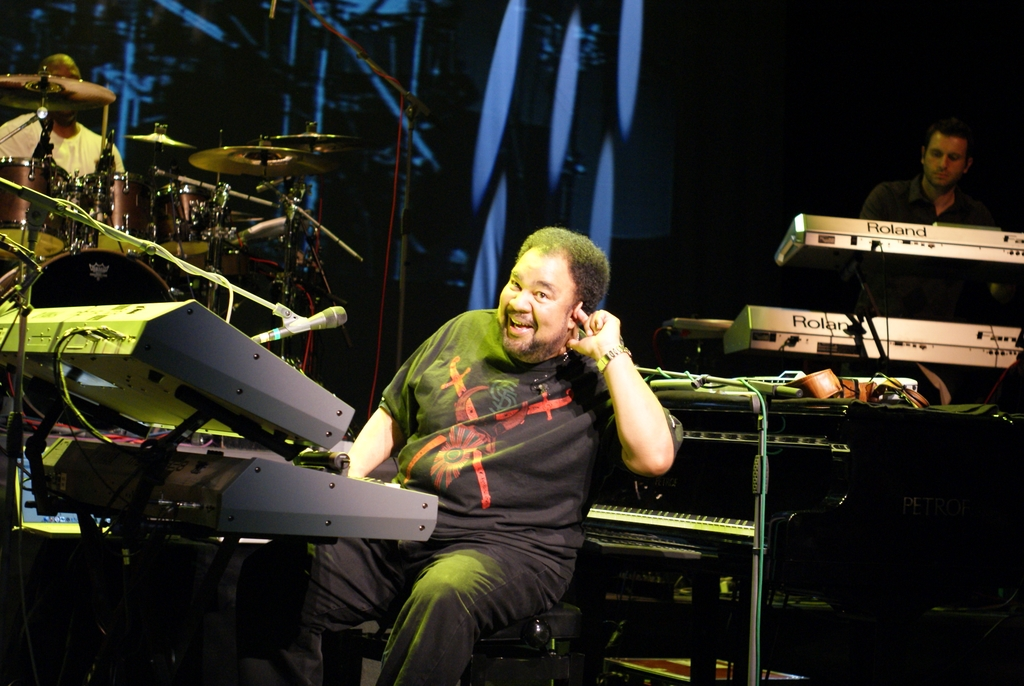
Duke performing on keyboards in 2010

Year	Category	Nominated work	Result
1981	Best R&B Performance by a Duo or Group with Vocal	The Clarke/Duke Project	Nominated
1985	Best Recording for Children	"We Are the World (single)"	Nominated
1990	"Best Instrumental Arrangement Accompanying Vocal(s)"	Fumilayo (track)	Nominated
1998	Best Instrumental Arrangement Accompanying Vocal(s)	"The Look of Love (track)"	Nominated
1998	Best Contemporary Jazz Performance	"After Hours"	Nominated
2000	Best Traditional R&B Vocal Album	"Cool"	Nominated
2000	Best Jazz Vocal Album	"In the Moment – Live in Concert"	Won
2001	Best Jazz Vocal Album	"The Calling: Celebrating Sarah Vaughan"	Won
2005	Best Pop Instrumental Performance	"T-Jam"	Nominated

=== GMA Dove Awards ===
Year	Category	Nominated work	Result
1993	Contemporary Black Gospel Album	Handel's Messiah: A Soulful Celebration	Won

=== Soul Train Awards ===
Year	Category	Nominated work	Result
2013	Best Contemporary Jazz Artist/Group		Won

=== Other honors ===
Al Jarreau recorded the tribute album My Old Friend: Celebrating George Duke (Concord, 2014) with songs written by Duke. Appearing on the album were Gerald Albright, Stanley Clarke, Dr. John, Lalah Hathaway, Boney James, Marcus Miller, Jeffrey Osborne, Greg Phillinganes, Kelly Price, Dianne Reeves, and Patrice Rushen. The album received the 2015 NAACP Image Award for Outstanding Jazz Album.

== Discography ==
- The George Duke Quartet Presented by the Jazz Workshop 1966 of San Francisco (1966)
- Save the Country (1970)
- The Inner Source (1973)
- Faces in Reflection (1974)
- Feel (1974)
- The Aura Will Prevail (1975)
- I Love the Blues, She Heard My Cry (1975)
- Liberated Fantasies (1976)
- From Me to You (1977)
- Reach for It (1977)
- The Dream (a.k.a. The 1976 Solo Keyboard Album) (1978)
- Don't Let Go (1978)
- Follow the Rainbow (1979)
- Master of the Game (1979)
- A Brazilian Love Affair (1980)
- The Clarke/Duke Project with Stanley Clarke (1981)
- Dream On (1982)
- Guardian of the Light (1983)
- Rendezvous (1984)
- Thief in the Night (1985)
- George Duke (1986)
- Night After Night (1989)
- Snapshot (1992)
- Illusions (1995)
- Is Love Enough? (1997)
- After Hours (1998)
- Cool (2000)
- Face the Music (2002)
- Duke (2005)
- In a Mellow Tone (2006)
- Dukey Treats (2008)
- Déjà Vu (2010)
- DreamWeaver (2013)
