= Billy Preston discography =

- Studio albums: 25
- EPs: 1
- Soundtrack albums: 1
- Live albums: 2
- Compilation albums: 8
- Singles: 63

This is the discography of American musician and singer Billy Preston.

== Albums ==
=== Studio albums ===
Title	Album details	Peak chart positions			
Title	Album details	US	US R&B	US Gospel	CAN
16 Yr. Old Soul	Released: June 1963; Label: Derby; Formats: LP	—	—	—	—
The Most Exciting Organ Ever	Released: January 1965; Label: Vee Jay; Formats: LP, 4-track	143	5	—	—
Hymns Speak from the Organ	Released: 1965; Label: Vee Jay; Formats: LP, 8-track	—	—	—	—
Early Hits of 1965	Released: December 1965; Label: Vee Jay; Formats: LP, 8-track	—	—	—	—
Wildest Organ in Town!	Released: June 1966; Label: Capitol; Formats: LP, 8-track	118	9	—	—
That's the Way God Planned It	Released: August 22, 1969; Label: Apple; Formats: LP, MC, 8-track	127 (Note: Peak position upon re-release in 1972.)	—	—	—
Encouraging Words	Released: September 11, 1970; Label: Apple; Formats: LP, MC, 8-track	—	50	—	—
I Wrote a Simple Song	Released: November 8, 1971; Label: A&M; Formats: LP, MC, 8-track	32	9	—	—
Music Is My Life	Released: October 1972; Label: A&M; Formats: LP, MC, 8-track	32	7	—	31
Everybody Likes Some Kind of Music	Released: September 21, 1973; Label: A&M; Formats: LP, MC, 8-track	52	3	—	76
The Kids & Me	Released: May 1974; Label: A&M; Formats: LP, MC, 8-track	17	8	—	21
It's My Pleasure	Released: June 1975; Label: A&M; Formats: LP, MC, 8-track	43	18	—	20
Billy Preston	Released: October 1976; Label: A&M; Formats: LP, MC, 8-track	—	—	—	—
A Whole New Thing	Released: November 1977; Label: A&M; Formats: LP, MC, 8-track	—	49	—	—
Behold!	Released: July 1978; Label: Myrrh; Formats: LP; Gospel album	—	—	—	—
Late at Night	Released: August 1979; Label: Motown; Formats: LP, MC, 8-track	49	73	—	—
Universal Love	Released: April 1980; Label: Myrrh; Formats: LP, MC, 8-track; Gospel album	—	—	—	—
The Way I Am	Released: February 1981; Label: Motown; Formats: LP, MC	—	—	—	—
Billy Preston & Syreeta	Released: July 1981; Label: Motown; Formats: LP, MC; With Syreeta	127	48	—	—
Pressin' On	Released: August 1982; Label: Motown; Formats: LP	—	—	—	—
On the Air	Released: July 1984; Label: Motown; Formats: LP, MC	—	—	—	—
Ministry of Music	Released: September 1985; Label: King James; Formats: LP; Gospel album	—	—	33	—
You Can't Keep a Good Man Down	Released: 1986; Label: D&K; Formats: LP, MC	—	—	—	—
Billy's Back!	Released: September 1995; Label: Nu Groov Music; Formats: LP, MC	—	—	—	—
Minister of Music	Released: 1995; Label: PepperCo; Formats: CD; Gospel album	—	—	—	—
You and I	Released: 1997; Label: Crisler; Formats: CD; Featuring Novecento	—	—	—	—
Music from My Heart	Released: August 21, 2001; Label: MCG Records; Formats: CD	—	—	—	—
"—" denotes releases that did not chart or were not released in that territory.

=== Live albums ===
Title	Album details
Club Meetin'	Released: October 1966; Label: Capitol; Formats: LP
Live European Tour	Released: August 2, 1974; Label: A&M; Formats: LP

=== Soundtrack albums ===
Title	Album details	Peak chart positions
Title	Album details	SWE
Fast Break	Released: March 1979; Label: Motown; Formats: LP, MC, 8-track; From the film of the same name; Preston features on six tracks	42

=== Compilation albums ===
Title	Album details
Billy's Bag	Released: 1976; Label: DJM; Formats: LP
The Best of Billy Preston	Released: 1980; Label: A&M; Formats: LP
The Best	Released: November 1982; Label: A&M; Formats: LP, MC
The Collection	Released: April 1989; Label: Castle Communications; Formats: CD, 2xLP
Ultimate Collection	Released: March 2000; Label: Hip-O; Formats: CD
Billys Bag – His Most Hammond Groovin 'Soul Movin' Sides 1963–1966	Released: November 2001; Label: RPM; Formats: CD
20th Century Masters – The Millennium Collection: The Best of Billy Preston	Released: May 21, 2002; Label: A&M; Formats: CD
Soul Derby – Complete Vee Jay Recordings 1964/1965	Released: 2003; Label: Vampi Soul; Formats: CD

== EPs ==
Title	EP details
Billy Preston's Beatles Salute	Released: 2004; Label: Billy Preston's Studio; Formats: CD; Limited promotional release

== Singles ==
Title	Year	Peak chart positions								Certifications	Album
Title	Year	US	US R&B	US AC	US Dance	AUS	CAN	NL	UK	Certifications	Album
"My Kind of Music"	1961	—	—	—	—	—	—	—	—		Non-album singles
"Volcano"	1961	—	—	—	—	—	—	—	—		Non-album singles
"Greazee"	1963	—	—	—	—	—	—	—	—		16 Yr. Old Soul
"Billy's Bag"	1965	—	—	—	—	—	—	—	51 (Note: Chart position is from the official UK "Breakers List" in 1966.)		The Most Exciting Organ Ever
"Drown in My Own Tears"	1965	—	—	—	—	—	—	—	—		The Most Exciting Organ Ever
"The Girl's Got "It""	1966	—	—	—	—	—	—	—	—		Non-album single
"Advice"	1966	—	—	—	—	—	—	—	—		Wildest Organ in Town!
"Sunny"	1966	—	—	—	—	—	—	—	—		Club Meetin'
"Can't She Tell"	1966	—	—	—	—	—	—	—	—		Non-album single
"Hey Brother"	1968	—	—	—	—	—	—	—	—		That's the Way God Planned It
"The Split"	1968	—	—	—	—	—	—	—	—		The Split
"Get Back" (with the Beatles) /	1969	1	—	—	—	1	1	1	1	RIAA: 2× Platinum; BPI: Silver	Let It Be
"Don't Let Me Down" (with the Beatles)	1969	35	—	—	—	—	—	—	—		Non-album single
"That's the Way God Planned It"	1969	62	—	—	—	22	61	14	11		That's the Way God Planned It
"Everything's Alright"	1969	—	—	—	—	76	—	—	—		That's the Way God Planned It
"All That I've Got (I'm Gonna Give It to You)"	1970	108	—	—	—	—	—	—	—		Non-album single
"If I Had a Hammer" (Note: "If I Had a Hammer" was only released as a single in the UK.)	1970	—	—	—	—	—	—	—	—		The Most Exciting Organ Ever
"My Sweet Lord"	1970	90	23	—	—	—	—	—	—		Encouraging Words
"I Wrote a Simple Song" /	1971	77	—	—	—	—	—	—	—		I Wrote a Simple Song
"Outa-Space"	1971	2	1	23	—	—	13	—	44	RIAA: Gold	I Wrote a Simple Song
"My Country 'Tis of Thee" (Note: "My Country 'Tis of Thee" was only released as a single in Japan.)	1972	—	—	—	—	—	—	—	—		I Wrote a Simple Song
"The Bus"	1972	—	43	—	—	—	—	—	—		I Wrote a Simple Song
"That's the Way God Planned It" (re-release)	1972	65	—	—	—	—	—	—	—		That's the Way God Planned It
"Slaughter"	1972	50	17	—	—	—	63	—	—		Slaughter
"Will It Go Round in Circles"	1973	1	10	—	—	99	1	—	—	RIAA: Gold	Music Is My Life
"Space Race"	1973	4	1	34	—	—	6	—	—	RIAA: Gold	Everybody Likes Some Kind of Music
"My Soul Is a Witness" (Note: "My Soul Is a Witness" was only released as a single in Germany.)	1973	—	—	—	—	—	—	—	—		Everybody Likes Some Kind of Music
"You're So Unique"	1974	48	11	—	—	—	42	—	—		Everybody Likes Some Kind of Music
"Nothing from Nothing"	1974	1	8	15	—	60	5	—	—	RIAA: Gold	The Kids & Me
"Struttin'"	1974	22	11	—	—	—	24	—	—		The Kids & Me
"Fancy Lady"	1975	71	23	—	—	—	83	—	—		It's My Pleasure
"That's Life" (Note: "That's Life" was only released as a single in Continental Europe.)	1975	—	—	—	—	—	—	—	—		It's My Pleasure
"Do It While You Can"	1975	—	58	—	—	—	—	—	—		It's My Pleasure
"I've Got the Spirit" /	1977	—	48	—	—	—	—	—	—		Billy Preston
"Do What You Want"	1977	—	48	—	—	—	—	—	—		Billy Preston
"Girl"	1977	—	44	—	—	—	—	—	—		Billy Preston
"Whole New Thing" /	1977	—	—	—	—	—	—	—	—		A Whole New Thing
"Wide Stride"	1977	—	33	—	—	—	—	—	—		A Whole New Thing
"I'm Really Gonna Miss You"	1978	—	59	—	—	—	—	—	—		A Whole New Thing
"Disco Dancin'" (Note: "Disco Dancin'" was only released as a single in a select few countries, including the Netherlands, Canada, Barbados and the Philippines.)	1978	—	—	—	—	—	—	39	—		A Whole New Thing
"Get Back"	1978	86	—	—	—	—	—	—	—		Sgt. Pepper's Lonely Hearts Club Band
"Go for It" (with Syreeta)	1979	108	—	—	80	—	—	—	—		Fast Break
"It Will Come in Time" (with Syreeta)	1979	—	—	—	—	—	—	15	47		Late at Night
"With You I'm Born Again" (with Syreeta)	1979	4	86	2	—	21	9	7	2	BPI: Silver	Late at Night
"Universal Love"	1980	—	—	—	—	—	—	—	—		Universal Love
"One More Time for Love" (with Syreeta)	1980	52	72	—	—	—	—	—	—		Syreeta
"Please Stay" (with Syreeta)	1980	—	—	—	—	—	—	—	—		Syreeta
"Hope"	1981	—	—	—	—	—	—	—	—		The Way I Am
"A Change Is Gonna Come"	1981	—	—	—	—	—	—	—	—		The Way I Am
"Searchin'" (with Syreeta)	1981	106	—	—	—	—	—	—	—		Billy Preston & Syreeta
"Just for You (Put the Boogie in Your Body)" (with Syreeta)	1981	—	—	—	—	—	—	—	—		Billy Preston & Syreeta
"A New Way to Say I Love You" (with Syreeta) (Note: "A New Way to Say I Love You" was initially only released as a single in France, before being released in the UK in 1983.)	1981	—	—	—	—	—	—	—	104 (Note: Chart position in 1983.)		Billy Preston & Syreeta
"I'll Make It with Your Love" (Note: "I'll Make It with Your Love" was only released as a single in Germany.)	1981	—	—	—	—	—	—	—	—		Non-album single
"Love" (with Syreeta) (Note: "Love" was only released as a single in Australia.)	1981	—	—	—	—	—	—	—	—		Billy Preston & Syreeta
"I'm Never Gonna Say Goodbye"	1982	88	64	38	—	—	—	—	—		Pressin' On
"Thanks, But No Thanks" (Note: "Thanks, But No Thanks" was only released as a single in Germany.)	1982	—	—	—	—	—	—	—	—		Pressin' On
"Pressin' On" (Note: "Pressin' On" was only released as a single in Spain.)	1983	—	—	—	—	—	—	—	—		Pressin' On
"And Dance"	1984	—	—	—	55	—	—	—	—		On the Air
"If You Let Me Love You" (Note: "If You Let Me Love You" was only released as a single in Belgium.)	1984	—	—	—	—	—	—	—	—		On the Air
"Here, There and Everywhere" (Note: "Here, There and Everywhere" was only released as a single in Belgium and Brazil.)	1984	—	—	—	—	—	—	—	—		On the Air
"Christmas with the Family" (as the Preston Family) (Note: "Christmas with the Family" was only released as a single in the Netherlands.)	1985	—	—	—	—	—	—	—	—		Non-album single
"So Good, So Fine" (with Ann-Louise Hanson) (Note: "So Good, So Fine" was only released as a single in Sweden.)	1986	—	—	—	—	—	—	—	—		Duva – Flyg igen
"What About the Love" (Note: "What About the Love" was only released as a single in the Netherlands.)	1986	—	—	—	—	—	—	—	—		You Can't Keep a Good Man Down
"Since I Held You Close"	1986	—	—	—	—	—	—	—	—		Non-album singles
"Heroes" (Note: "Heroes" was only released as a single in Europe.)	1991	—	—	—	—	—	—	—	103		Non-album singles
"Watching the Hands of Time" (with Syreeta) (Note: "Watching the Hands of Time" was only released as a single in the UK.)	1991	—	—	—	—	—	—	—	—		Non-album singles
"Hold Me" (Note: "Hold Me" was only released as a single in Italy.)	1997	—	—	—	—	—	—	—	—		You and I
"—" denotes releases that did not chart or were not released in that territory.

== As a guest/session performer ==
- 1963: Night Beat (Sam Cooke)
- 1965: "I Don't Know What You Got (But It's Got Me)" (Little Richard)
- 1967: "In the Heat of the Night" (Ray Charles)
- 1969: A Black Man's Soul (Ike Turner)
- 1969: "Get Back" and "Don't Let Me Down" (The Beatles)
- 1969: Abbey Road (The Beatles)
- 1970: Let It Be (The Beatles)
- 1970: All Things Must Pass (George Harrison)
- 1970: John Lennon/Plastic Ono Band (John Lennon) – piano on "God"
- 1971: Sticky Fingers (The Rolling Stones)
- 1971: The Concert for Bangladesh (George Harrison and Friends)
- 1971: There's a Riot Goin' On (Sly and the Family Stone)
- 1971: Live at Fillmore West (King Curtis and Aretha Franklin)
- 1971: Barbra Joan Streisand (Barbra Streisand) – keyboards and drums
- 1972: Exile on Main St. (The Rolling Stones)
- 1972: Wind of Change (Peter Frampton) – piano, keyboards, harpsichord, accordion
- 1973: Ringo (Ringo Starr) – organ on "I'm the Greatest" and "Oh My My"
- 1973: Goats Head Soup (The Rolling Stones)
- 1974: Dark Horse (George Harrison) – electric piano
- 1974: Goodnight Vienna (Ringo Starr) – clavinet on the title track, electric piano on "Only You"
- 1974: It's Only Rock 'n Roll (The Rolling Stones)
- 1975: "You Are So Beautiful" (Joe Cocker)
- 1975: "Take Me Back" "They Shall Be Mine" (Andrae Crouch and the Disciples) - organ
- 1975: Extra Texture (Read All About It) (George Harrison) – electric piano on "His Name Is Legs (Ladies And Gentlemen)"
- 1975: "Steal Miss Liza (Steal Liza Jane)" (Little Richard)
- 1976: Thirty Three & 1/3 (George Harrison)
- 1976: No Reason to Cry (Eric Clapton)
- 1976: Black and Blue (The Rolling Stones)
- 1976: Love You Live (The Rolling Stones)
- 1978: Sgt. Pepper's Lonely Hearts Club Band – also acted the part "Sgt. Pepper" in the film
- 1979: "God Loves You" (The Archers) - organ
- 1981: Tattoo You (The Rolling Stones)
- 1982: Gone Troppo (George Harrison)
- 1985: "Til My Baby Comes Home" (Luther Vandross) – organ
- 1986: "Great Gosh A'Mighty (Been a Long Time Comin')" – co-written with Little Richard – from the film Down and Out in Beverly Hills (sung by Little Richard)
- 1986: "Big House Reunion" (Little Richard)
- 1987: Steppin' Up – Hank Crawford and Jimmy McGriff – piano
- 1990: Ringo Starr and His All-Starr Band – keyboards and vocals
- 1990: Giovani Jovanotti (Jovanotti) – keyboards and Fender Rhodes
- 1990: "Show Me Your Soul" – Red Hot Chili Peppers
- 1991: ...E La Vita Continua (Nino D'Angelo)
- 1993: Wandering Spirit (Mick Jagger) – "Sweet Thing", "Out of Focus", "Use Me", "Wandering Spirit" and "I've Been Lonely for So Long".
- 1996: Voyage of Dreams (Jephté Guillaume and the Tet Kale Orkestra) – organ, strings on "Al Di Yo", "Go Tell Them", "Kanpe", "Get Up"
- 1996: Donnie McClurkin (Donnie McClurkin) – organ
- 1996: Love Brought Me Back (Helen Baylor) – organ
- 1996: El Equilibrio de los Jaguares (Jaguares) – organ / Hammond B3 on "Detrás de los Cerros"
- 1996: Peace Beyond Passion (Me'shell Ndegeocello) – keyboards on "Deuteronomy: Niggerman"
- 1997: Bridges to Babylon (The Rolling Stones) – organ on "Saint of Me"
- 1997: Estas en mí (Juana La Loca) – piano
- 1998: Undiscovered Soul (Richie Sambora)
- 2000: The Harsh Light of Day (Fastball) – keyboards on "You're An Ocean"
- 2001: Songs from the West Coast (Elton John) – Hammond organ on "I Want Love", "The Wasteland", "Love Her Like Me"
- 2001: Everybody Got Their Something (Nikka Costa) – Clavinet
- 2001: Reptile (Eric Clapton)
- 2001: One More Car, One More Rider (Eric Clapton, live) – the DVD includes a live performance of "Will It Go Round in Circles"
- 2002: Travelogue (Joni Mitchell) – Hammond B3 on the track "You Dream Flat Tires"
- 2002: American IV: The Man Comes Around (Johnny Cash) – piano on "Tear Stained Letter" and "Personal Jesus"
- 2002: Concert for George – including "Isn't It a Pity" and "My Sweet Lord"
- 2003: The Colored Section (Donnie) – Hammond B3 on the last track: "The Colored Section"
- 2003: Get Born (Jet)
- 2004: Me and Mr. Johnson (Eric Clapton) – also appears in the companion DVD, Sessions for Robert J
- 2004: Crossroads Guitar Festival (Eric Clapton)
- 2004: Genius Loves Company (Ray Charles)
- 2004: That's Life (Julia Fordham)
- 2005: 12 Songs (Neil Diamond)
- 2005: Back Home (Eric Clapton)
- 2005: Choose Love (Ringo Starr)
- 2005: The Concert for Bangladesh (George Harrison and Friends) (re-mastered version and video)
- 2005: I Believe to My Soul (Featuring Ann Peebles, Billy Preston, Mavis Staples, Irma Thomas, and Allen Toussaint)
- 2005: Tough on Crime (Rebecca Pidgeon) – keyboards
- 2006: Stadium Arcadium (Red Hot Chili Peppers) – "Warlocks"
- 2006: The Road to Escondido (Eric Clapton, J. J. Cale)
- 2006: Overnight Sensational (Sam Moore) – Hammond B3 on "I Can't Stand the Rain" and sings and plays on "You Are So Beautiful"
- 2007: Reach (Is'real Benton) – organ on "Have a Good Time"
- 2007: Imagine (Howard Hewett) – organ
- 2011: Brussels Affair (Live 1973) (The Rolling Stones)
- 2012: L.A. Friday (Live 1975) (The Rolling Stones)
- 2019: Cat's Eyes (Robin Millar (producer)) - Hammond Organ on "Remember" recorded 1974, released 2019
- 2020: Goats Head Soup – 2020 Deluxe Edition (The Rolling Stones)
- 2022: El Mocambo 1977 (The Rolling Stones)
- 2025: Black and Blue - 2025 mix by Steven Wilson (The Rolling Stones)
