= I Wrote a Simple Song (song) =

- French picture sleeve

Single by Billy Preston

from the album I Wrote a Simple Song
- B-side: "Outa-Space"
- Released: December 20, 1971
- Genre: Soul, rock
- Length: 3:28
- Label: A&M
- Songwriters: Billy Preston, Joe Greene
- Producer: Billy Preston

Billy Preston singles chronology
"My Sweet Lord" (1970)	"I Wrote a Simple Song" (1971)	"Slaughter" (1972)

"I Wrote a Simple Song" is a song by American soul musician Billy Preston that was first released as the title track to his album of the same name in November 1971. It was written by Preston and his regular collaborator, Joe Greene. The song was also Preston's first single on A&M Records, following the end of his tenure on the Beatles' Apple record label. In the United States, it peaked at number 77 on the Billboard Hot 100. Radio programmers there soon favored the B-side, the instrumental "Outa-Space", which had been Preston's choice for the lead side. "Outa-Space" became a breakthrough US hit for Preston and his first RIAA-certified gold single. The single was released in Britain on January 21, 1972.

The recording features a guest appearance from Preston's Apple producer, George Harrison, on dobro, and an orchestral arrangement by Quincy Jones. The song serves as an example of Preston's continuing association with Harrison after the Beatles' break-up, despite his departure for A&M. Its release followed Preston's well-received performance of "That's the Way God Planned It" at Harrison's Concert for Bangladesh shows on August 1, 1971, which had raised Preston's public profile.
