= Alvin Taylor =

American drummer

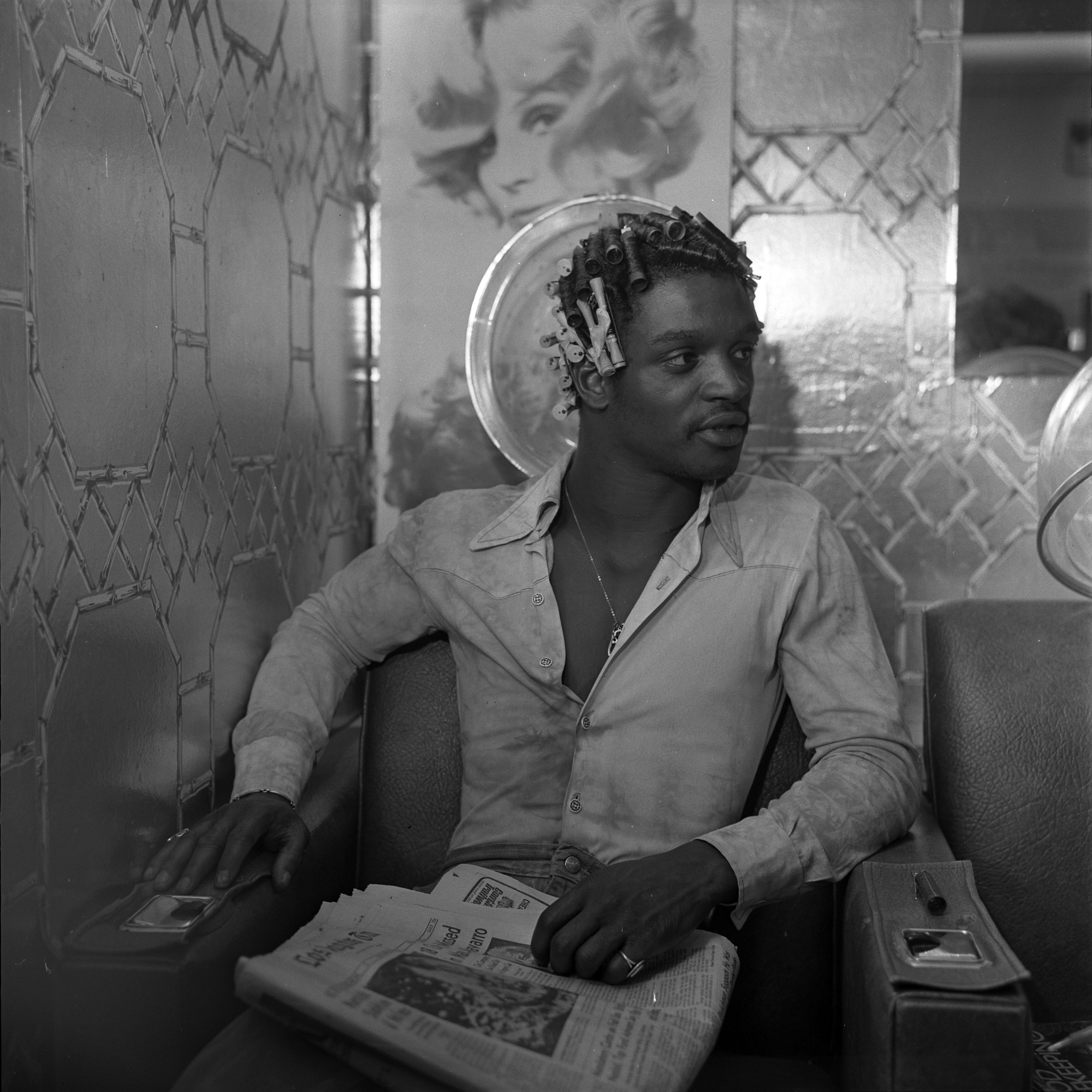
- Taylor in a hair salon, 1974

Background information
- Born: March 26, 1953 (age 73)
- Genres: Rock
- Occupation: Musician
- Instrument: Drums
- Years active: 1970s - present
- Label: Capitol Records

Alvin Taylor (born March 26, 1953) is an American drummer, producer, musical director, and author who is best known for his work with Elton John, Eric Burdon, George Harrison, Billy Preston, and Bob Welch.

== Early life and career ==
Alvin Taylor started playing drums at the age of 5. He played in various local bands and began his professional career at the age of 14, when he started touring with Little Richard. As part of Little Richard's band, Taylor played with Jimi Hendrix, Billy Preston and opened a show for Elvis Presley. Later he played with PG&E on their number one record, Are You Ready. He turned down Jerry Goldstein's offer to play in the famous funk band War, but joined Eric Burdon's band after Burdon left War.

The Eric Burdon Band released a hard rock-packed album, Sun Secrets; Taylor is shown on the cover. Taylor was also featured on their unreleased album Mirage (released in 2008), Don Kirshner's Rock Concert (on February 9, 1974), and is mentioned in Burdon's 2001 book Don't Let Me Be Misunderstood.

Taylor performed at the first ever airing of Saturday Night Live on October 11, 1975. In 1976 he played on George Harrison's album Thirty Three & 1/3, recorded at the former Beatle's Friar Park estate in England. Citing the album sessions, Taylor later called Harrison "the very best and my most favorite person" of all the artists with whom he had worked. He played on two albums by Billy Preston, Billy Preston (1976) and A Whole New Thing (1977). He then joined Bob Welch's band and recorded the album French Kiss (1977), which featured the hit single "Ebony Eyes".

During subsequent years he appeared on albums by artists including Elton John, Aalon, Jesse Colin Young, Les McCann, Lauren Wood, Gil-Scott Heron, The Originals, Syreeta, The Mighty Clouds of Joy, Keni Burke, Stargard, Sammy Hagar, Billy Thorpe, America, Cher, Natalie Cole, Sly & the Family Stone, Bill Withers, and Three Hearts by Bob Welch. On Danny O'Keefe's record American Roulette (1977) he appeared alongside Reggie McBride, Mike Melvoin, and David Lindley.

In 1979, he appeared on Sammy Hagar's single (Sittin' On) The Dock of the Bay which features Leland Sklar, Barry Goudreau and Steve Cropper, who originally played on the Otis Redding version. Later in the same year he appeared on Cher's album Prisoner with Toto members Steve Lukather, Jeff Porcaro, David Hungate, David Paich, and others.

In 1980 he appeared again with Lukather and Paich on Elton John's album 21 at 33. Other notable musicians include Bill Champlin, Chuck Findley, and Lenny Castro. Taylor then appeared on Bob Welch's albums Man Overboard (1980) and Bob Welch (1981). In 1981, he also appeared on the album 1234 by The Rolling Stones member Ron Wood.

In 2011 he began working with Ukulele Ray and regularly plays at the NAMM Show. Beginning in 2013 he toured with "The Gypsy Experience" as well as former Earth, Wind & Fire member, David Lautrec and his group Desert Redux.

In 2024, Taylor released his autobiography, “Drum Major 2 Major Drummer” on Amazon in both paperback and ebook. He also announced his Official Website and has been actively promoting his book through book signings and new social media content on Facebook, Instagram, TikTok, and X (Twitter).

== Discography ==
=== George Harrison ===
- Thirty Three & 1/3 (1976)

=== Bill Withers ===
- Menagerie (1977)
- The Complete Sussex and Columbia Albums (2012, Compilation)
- Original Album Classics (2013, Compilation)

=== Billy Preston ===
- Billy Preston (1976)
- A Whole New Thing (1977)

=== Bob Welch ===
- French Kiss (1977)
- Three Hearts (1979)
- Man Overboard (1980)
- Bob Welch (1981)
- Live from the Roxy (2004, Live-Recording from 1981)

=== Elton John ===
- 21 at 33 (1980)
- The Fox (1981)
- To Be Continued... (1990, Compilation)

=== Eric Burdon ===
- Sun Secrets (1974)
- Stop (1975)
- Survivor (1977)
- Sun Secrets & Stop (1993, Compilation)
- Soldier of Fortune (1997, Unreleased-Compilation)
- Live at the Roxy (1998, Live-Recording from 1975)
- Live 17th October 1974 (2009, Live-Recording from 1974)

=== Sly & the Family Stone ===
- Back on the Right Track (1979)
- Who in the Funk Do You Think You Are (2001, Compilation)

=== Other Credits ===
- The Originals - Communique (1976)
- Syreeta - One to One (1977)
- Danny O'Keefe - American Roulette (1977)
- Aalon - Cream City (1977)
- Stargard - What You Waitin' For (1978)
- Cher - Prisoner (1979)
- Pyrymyd - Pyrymyd (1980)
- Billy Thorpe - Stimulation (1981)
- Ron Wood - 1234 (1981)
- America - View From The Ground (1982)
