= Live European Tour =

Live album by Billy Preston
- Released: 2 August 1974
- Recorded: 1 September–27 October 1973
- Genre: Soul, rock
- Length: 40:28
- Label: A&M
- Producer: Billy Preston

Billy Preston chronology
Everybody Likes Some Kind of Music (1973)	Live European Tour (1974)	The Kids & Me (1974)

Professional ratings
Review scores
Source	Rating
AllMusic	4/5 stars

Live European Tour is the only live album by Billy Preston, released in 1974 in Europe and Japan. It was recorded during his opening act stint for the Rolling Stones 1973 European Tour, featuring Mick Taylor on lead guitar and Preston's own band "The God Squad". In 2002, A&M Records released the album in Japan, featuring alternative song takes.

== Track listing ==
=== Original release ===
Side one

1. "Medley: Day Tripper/The Bus" (John Lennon, Paul McCartney; Preston, Joe Greene)
2. "Let It Be" (Lennon, McCartney)
3. "Let's Go Get Stoned" (Valerie Simpson, Nickolas Ashford, Jo Armstead)
4. "Billy's Bag" (Preston)

Side two

1. "Will It Go Round in Circles" (Preston, Bruce Fisher)
2. "Outa-Space" (Preston, Greene)
3. "Higher (Vamp)" (S. Stewart)
4. "Get Back" (Lennon, McCartney)

=== 2002 CD reissue ===
1. "Day Tripper" (Lennon, McCartney) – 2:07
2. "The Bus" (Preston, Greene) – 10:58
3. "Let It Be" (Lennon, McCartney) – 2:28
4. "Will It Go Round in Circles" (Preston, Fisher) – 3:44
5. "Let's Go Get Stoned" (Simpson, Ashford, Armstead) – 1:36
6. "Space Race" (Preston) – 1:57
7. "Amazing Grace" (traditional; arranged by Preston) – 4:43
8. "That's the Way God Planned It" (Preston) – 4:05
9. "Outa-Space/Higher" (Preston, Greene) – 8:05

== Personnel ==
- Billy Preston - all keyboards, melodica, lead vocals
- Mick Taylor - guitars, backing vocals
- Hubert Heard - keyboards
- Kenneth Lupper - keyboards
- Manuel Kellough - drums, percussion

== Production ==
- Billy Preston: Producer.
- Andy Johns: Engineer.
- Robert Ellis: Direction.
- Bruce Wayne: Road Manager.
- Roland Young: Art Direction.
- Junie Osaki: Design.
- Album remixed at A&M recording studios, Hollywood California.
