= Music Is My Life =

Studio album by Billy Preston
- Released: October 1972
- Recorded: 1971–72
- Genre: Soul, rock
- Length: 45.04
- Label: A&M
- Producer: Billy Preston

Billy Preston chronology
I Wrote a Simple Song (1971)	Music Is My Life (1972)	Everybody Likes Some Kind of Music (1973)

Professional ratings
Review scores
Source	Rating
AllMusic	2/5 stars

Music Is My Life is the seventh studio album by Billy Preston, released in 1972. The album contains Preston's first number 1 single, "Will It Go Round in Circles", and a cover of the Beatles' song "Blackbird". It is also the first of his albums to feature his future A&M Records label-mates the Brothers Johnson. Another track, "God Loves You", was issued on a single as the B-side of "Slaughter", Preston's theme song for the 1972 film of the same name.

== Track listing ==
All songs by Billy Preston, except where noted.

Side one

1. "We're Gonna Make It" – 3:13
2. "One Time or Another" (Preston, Robert Sam) – 2:49
3. "Blackbird" (John Lennon, Paul McCartney) – 2:48
4. "I Wonder Why" (Preston, George Johnson) – 5:43
5. "Will It Go Round in Circles" (Preston, Bruce Fisher) – 4:28
6. "Ain't That Nothin'" (Preston, Joe Greene, Sam) – 3:47

Side two

1. "God Loves You" (Preston, John Schuler) – 2:50
2. "Make the Devil Mad (Turn on to Jesus)" – 5:22
3. "Nigger Charlie" (Preston, Greene) – 6:31
4. "Heart Full of Sorrow" (Preston, Johnson) – 3:35
5. "Music Is My Life" – 3:58

== Personnel ==
- Billy Preston - keyboards, bass guitar, vocals
- George Johnson - guitar
- Louis Johnson - bass guitar
- Hubert Heard - keyboards
- Manuel Kellough - drums
- Tom Scott - horn
- Jim Horn - horn
- George Bohanon - horn
- Buck Monari - horn
- Paul Hubinon - horn
- Clydie King, Venetta Fields, Oma Drake - background vocals
- The Campbell-Kurban String Section - strings
- Clarence McDonald, David T. Walker - arrangements

Technical

- Roland Young - art direction
- Jim McCrary - photography
