= Whole New Thing (disambiguation) =

Whole New Thing is a 2005 Canadian film directed by Amnon Buchbinder.

Whole New Thing may also refer to:

- A Whole New Thing (Sly and the Family Stone album)
- A Whole New Thing (Billy Preston album)
