= Everybody Likes Some Kind of Music =

Studio album by Billy Preston
- Released: 21 September 1973
- Recorded: March–May 1973
- Studio: A&M (Hollywood)
- Genre: Soul, rock
- Length: 32:55
- Label: A&M
- Producer: Billy Preston

Billy Preston chronology
Music Is My Life (1972)	Everybody Likes Some Kind of Music (1973)	Live European Tour (1974)

Everybody Likes Some Kind of Music is the eighth studio album by American musician Billy Preston. It was released in September 1973 on A&M Records.

== Songs and musical style ==
Professional ratings
Review scores
Source	Rating
AllMusic	2.5/5 stars
Record Collector	3/5 stars
The Rolling Stone Record Guide	2/5 stars

The album includes the instrumental "Space Race", which was released as a single and was a sequel of sorts to Preston's 1971 hit "Outa-Space". The instrumental proved popular enough that the musical variety show American Bandstand used it as the song for its mid-broadcast break from the mid-1970s until the show completed its run in 1989. The album also features of cover of Bob Dylan's "It's Alright, Ma (I'm Only Bleeding)". "How Long Has the Train Been Gone" was released as a single, as was "You're So Unique" the following year.

"Do You Love Me" was the basis for the Rolling Stones' "Melody" on their 1976 Black and Blue album, and on that album the track is given the credit "inspiration by Billy Preston".

Stylistically, the album covers many types of music including soul, rock, gospel, jazz, R&B and even classical. As such, it is perhaps Preston's most musically diverse record.

The song "Space Race" was featured on the BBC's The Old Grey Whistle Test on 30 October 1973. The song was the first time that Preston had used an ARP synthesizer; he had written the tune whilst coming to grips with the technology.

== Track listing ==
All songs by Billy Preston, except where noted.

Side One

1. "Everybody Likes Some Kind of Music" – 1:08
2. "You're So Unique" – 3:13
3. "How Long Has the Train Been Gone" (Preston, Bruce Fisher) – 2:25
4. "My Soul is a Witness" (Preston, Joe Greene) – 2:47
5. "Sunday Morning" (Preston, Fisher) – 1:41
6. "You've Got Me For Company" (Preston, Fisher) – 2:09
7. "Listen to the Wind" (Preston, Fisher) – 3:04

Side Two

1. "Everybody Likes Some Kind of Music (reprise)" – 0:18
2. "Space Race" – 3:23
3. "Do You Love Me?" (Preston, Fisher) – 2:48
4. "I'm So Tired" (Preston, Fisher) – 4:16
5. "It's Alright, Ma (I'm Only Bleeding)" (Bob Dylan) – 3:39
6. "Minuet For Me" – 2:05

== Personnel ==
- Billy Preston – vocals, keyboards, bass guitar, producer
- David T. Walker – guitar
- Dennis Coates – banjo
- Hubert Heard, Kenneth Lupper – keyboards
- Choir of Divine Guidance Youth Choir, directed by Rodena Fairley
- Paul Riser – string & horn arrangements
- Clarence McDonald – arrangement on "My Soul is a Witness"
- Manuel Kellough – drums

Technical

- Tommy Vicari – engineer
- Robert Young – art director

== Charts ==
Year	Album	Chart positions	
Year	Album	US	US R&B
1973	Everybody Likes Some Kind of Music	52	3

=== Singles ===
Year	Single	Chart positions		
Year	Single	US	US R&B	US Dance
1973	"Space Race"	4	1	—
1974	"You're So Unique"	48	11	—
