= I Wrote a Simple Song =

Studio album by Billy Preston
- Released: 8 November 1971
- Recorded: February, August–September 1971
- Studio: A&M (Hollywood)
- Genres: Soul, rock
- Length: 40:03
- Label: A&M
- Producer: Billy Preston

Billy Preston chronology
| Encouraging Words (1970) | I Wrote a Simple Song (1971) | Music Is My Life (1972) |

I Wrote a Simple Song is the sixth studio album by American soul musician Billy Preston. Released in November 1971, it was his first album for A&M Records and marked the start of a run of commercial success in the United States that lasted through to the late 1970s. The album includes the hit single "Outa-Space", which won the Grammy Award for Best Pop Instrumental Performance of 1972. Preston included a live version of the instrumental "The Bus", as part of a medley with the Beatles' "Day Tripper", on his 1974 album Live European Tour.

== Recording ==
I Wrote a Simple Song was Preston's first self-produced album. Preston's friend George Harrison played lead guitar on most of the songs, and supplied dobro accompaniment on the title track. The album continued Preston's inclusion of gospel-themed songs which had started with the 1967 album Club Meeting.

== Reception ==
Professional ratings
Review scores
| Source | Rating |
|---|---|
| AllMusic | 2/5 stars |

The instrumental "Outa-Space" won a Grammy Award for Best Pop Instrumental Performance in 1973.

== Track listing ==
All songs by Billy Preston and Joe Greene, except where noted.

Side one

1. "Should Have Known Better" – 2:28
2. "I Wrote a Simple Song" – 3:28
3. "John Henry" (Preston, Robert Sam) – 3:15
4. "Without a Song" (William Rose, Edward Eliscu, Vincent Youmans) – 4:57
5. "The Bus" – 3:32

Side two

1. "Outa-Space" – 4:08
2. "The Looner Tune" (Preston, Greene, Jesse Kirkland) – 2:47
3. "You Done Got Older" (Preston, Bruce Fisher) – 3:08
4. "Swing Down Chariot" (traditional; arranged by Preston and Greene) – 4:13
5. "God Is Great" – 3:32
6. "My Country, 'Tis of Thee" (traditional) – 4:27

== Personnel ==
- Billy Preston - vocals, piano, Hammond organ, keyboards
- David T. Walker - electric guitar
- George Harrison - guitar, Dobro
- Louis Johnson - bass guitar
- Manuel Kellough - drums
- King Errisson - congas, percussion
- Rocky Peoples - tenor saxophone
- Carlos Garnette - trumpet
- Quincy Jones - string and horn arrangements
- Clydie King, Douglas Gibbs, Duane Rogers, Eugene Bryant, Jesse Kirkland, Merry Clayton, Myrna Matthews, Patrice Holloway, Sherrell Atwood, Venetta Fields - backing vocals

Technical

- Roland Young - art direction
- Jim McCrary - photography
- Tommy Vicari - engineer

== Charts ==
| Year | Album | Chart positions | |
| Year | Album | US | US R&B |
|---|---|---|---|
| 1972 | I Wrote a Simple Song | 32 | 9 |

=== Singles ===
| Year | Single | Chart positions | | |
| Year | Single | US | US R&B | US Dance |
|---|---|---|---|---|
| 1972 | "I Wrote a Simple Song" | 77 | — | — |
| 1972 | "Outa-Space" | 2 | 1 | — |
| 1972 | "The Bus" | — | 43 | — |
