= Ollie E. Brown =

American drummer (born 1953)

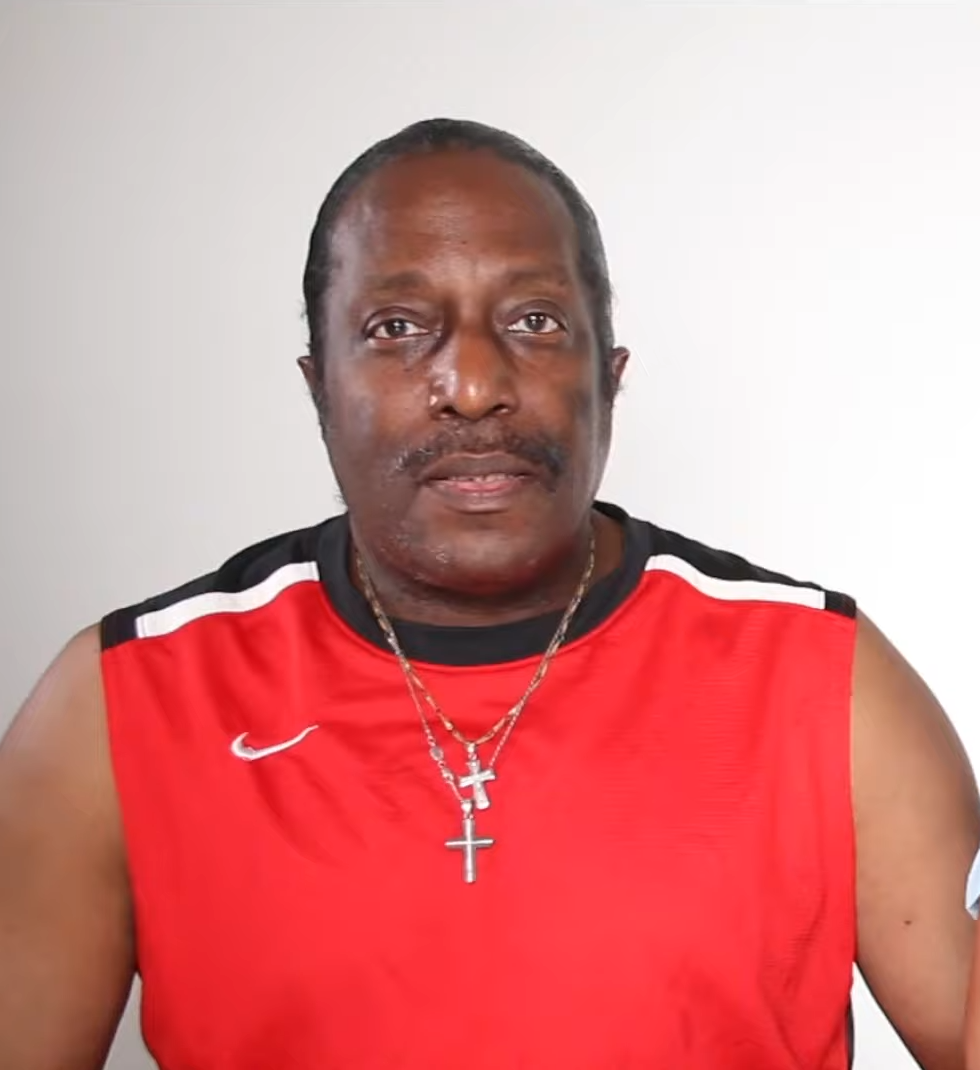
- Brown in 2018

Background information
- Also known as: Ollie Brown
- Born: April 20, 1953 (age 72); Detroit, Michigan, U.S.
- Genres: Rock; electro; synth-pop
- Occupations: Drummer; percussionist; record producer; session musician; realtor
- Instruments: Percussion; drums; synthesizers
- Years active: 1971–present
- Website: olliebrown.rodeore.com

Ollie E. Brown (born April 20, 1953) is an American drummer, percussionist, record producer, and high school basketball coach. A prolific session musician, Brown has performed on more than a hundred albums in the 1970s, 1980s and 1990s. Brown was also half of the American dance-pop duo Ollie & Jerry, which had a Top 10 hit with "Breakin'... There's No Stopping Us" in 1984.

== Early years ==
Brown was born in Detroit, Michigan, on April 20, 1953. By 1976, he had already performed as a drummer or percussionist on dozens of albums, including I Can Stand a Little Rain by Joe Cocker, 1990 and A Song for You by The Temptations, It's My Pleasure by Billy Preston, and Black and Blue by The Rolling Stones. In the 1970s Brown also performed on albums by Diana Ross, Van Morrison, Leo Sayer, and Sly and the Family Stone.

Along with Billy Preston and pianist Ian Stewart, Brown was part of the Rolling Stones Tour of the Americas '75 and The Rolling Stones Tour of Europe '76. He also was an early member of Stevie Wonder's band Wonderlove.

== Raydio and Ollie & Jerry ==
In the late 1970s, Brown performed on Raydio's self-titled debut album. This led to a partnership with Raydio bassist Jerry Knight, who was also a prolific session musician. Together, the two formed the duo Ollie & Jerry, and recorded the song "Breakin'... There's No Stopping Us" for the 1984 breakdancing-themed film Breakin'. The song was successful, reaching number 9 on the Billboard Hot 100 in 1984.

Ollie & Jerry also performed on the soundtrack for the 1984 Breakin' sequel Breakin' 2: Electric Boogaloo. Their single "Electric Boogaloo" was the lead track from the soundtrack, but was less successful than its predecessor, reaching only number 45 on the R&B chart, and not charting at all on the Billboard Top 40.

The Breakin' 2 soundtrack album itself, however, did chart, reaching number 25 on the Billboard R&B Albums chart, and number 52 on the Billboard 200 albums chart.

Brown wrote and performed the song "They're So Incredible" for the soundtrack to the 1984 film Revenge of the Nerds. "They're So Incredible" is performed by the nerds in the film with different lyrics.

== Later work ==
During and after his work with Ollie & Jerry, Brown continued his prolific behind-the-scenes work, producing or performing on dozens of albums between 1980 and 2000. Highlights include the number-one album Bad by Michael Jackson, and the Ray Parker Jr. single "Ghostbusters", which Brown produced. In the 1980s, Brown also produced or performed on albums by Blondie, The Jacksons, La Toya Jackson ("If You Feel the Funk"), DeBarge and Quincy Jones.

Brown currently works in the real estate industry.

== Collaborations ==
With Candi Staton

- Young Hearts Run Free (Columbia Records, 1976)
- House of Love (Warner Bros. Records, 1978)

With The Rolling Stones

- Black And Blue (Rolling Stones Records, 1976)
- Love You Live (Rolling Stones Records, 1977)

With Syreeta Wright

- Stevie Wonder Presents: Syreeta (Motown, 1974)
- Rich Love, Poor Love (Motown, 1977)
- Syreeta (Tamla, 1980)
- Set My Love in Motion (Motown, 1981)
- The Spell (Tamla, 1983)

With Eric Carmen

- Boats Against the Current (Arista Records, 1977)

With Billy Preston

- It's My Pleasure (A&M Records, 1975)
- Billy Preston (A&M Records, 1976)
- A Whole New Thing (A&M Records, 1977)
- Late at Night (Motown, 1979)
- The Way I Am (Motown, 1981)

With Patti LaBelle

- Tasty (Epic Records, 1978)

With John Phillips

- Pay Pack & Follow (Eagle Records, 2001)

With Cheryl Lynn

- In the Night (Columbia Records, 1981)

With Michael Jackson

- Bad (Epic Records, 1987)

With Minnie Riperton

- Perfect Angel (Epic Records, 1974)

With Billy Preston and Syreeta Wright

- Billy Preston & Syreeta (Motown, 1981)

With Deniece Williams

- When Love Comes Calling (Columbia Records, 1978)

With Wilson Pickett

- American Soul Man (Motown, 1987)

With Gloria Gaynor

- Gloria Gaynor (Atlantic Records, 1982)

With Joe Cocker

- I Can Stand a Little Rain (A&M Records, 1974)

With Patti Austin

- Patti Austin (Qwest, 1984)

With Kenny Rogers

- Share Your Love (Liberty Records, 1981)

With Leo Sayer

- Leo Sayer (Chrysalis Records, 1978)

With Ray Parker Jr.

- The Other Woman (Arista Records, 1982)
- Woman Out of Control (Arista Records, 1983)
- After Dark (Geffen, 1987)
- I Love You Like You Are (MCA Records, 1991)
