= The Way I Am (Billy Preston album) =

Studio album by Billy Preston
- Released: February 1981
- Studio: Motown/Hitsville U.S.A. Recording Studios, Ocean Way Recording and NSP Studios (Hollywood, California); Cherokee Studios (Los Angeles, California)
- Genre: Soul
- Length: 34.54
- Label: Motown
- Producer: Billy Preston (tracks 2, 4, 7, 8, 9), David Shire (track 8), David Paich (track 9), Bob Esty (track 1), Hal Davis (tracks 2, 3, 6), Berry Gordy Jr. (track 5), Paul Jabara (track 1), Marty Paich (tracks 4, 9), Arthur G. Wright (tracks 2, 3, 6), Russ Terrana (track 2, 6, 8), Suzee Ikeda (track 5)

Billy Preston chronology
| Late at Night (1979) | The Way I Am (1981) | Billy Preston & Syreeta (1981) |

Professional ratings
Review scores
| Source | Rating |
|---|---|
| AllMusic | 2/5 stars |

The Way I Am is the fourteenth studio album by Billy Preston, released in 1981. The album was arranged by Bob Esty, David Blumberg, Arthur G. Wright, Marty Paich, Gene Page and Billy Preston.

== Track listing ==
1. "Hope" (Bob Esty, Paul Jabara) – 3:19
2. "Good Life Boogie" (Billy Preston) – 4:17
3. "Keep on Truckin'" (Frank Wilson, Leonard Caston, Jr., Anita Poree) – 4:25
4. "A Change Is Gonna Come" (Sam Cooke) – 3:57
5. "Lay Your Feelings on Me" (Kay Lewis, Helen Lewis) – 4:20
6. "I Won't Mistreat Your Love" (Preston, Bruce Fisher) – 3:57
7. "Baby I'm Yours" (Van McCoy) – 3:18
8. "Until Then" (Preston, Jesse Kirkland, Joe Greene) – 3:34
9. "The Way I Am" (David Paich) – 4:55

== Personnel ==
- Billy Preston – vocals, backing vocals, keyboards, synthesizers, arrangements (8)
- William Bryant – keyboards
- Dave Budimir – synthesizers
- Reginald "Sonny" Burke – keyboards
- Michael Lang – keyboards
- David Paich – keyboards
- David Shire – keyboards
- Charles Fearing – guitars
- Marlo Henderson – guitars
- Paul Jackson Jr. – guitars
- Steve Lukather – guitars
- Greg Poree – guitars
- Melvin "Wah Wah Watson" Ragin – guitars
- Red Rhodes – guitars
- Trevor Veitch – guitars
- David T. Walker – guitars
- Arthur G. Wright – guitars, arrangements (3)
- Marvin Charlot – bass
- Nathan East – bass
- David Hungate – bass
- Les Hurdle – bass
- Abraham Laboriel – bass
- Reggie McBride – bass
- Freddie "Ready Freddie" Washington – bass
- Eddie N. Watkins Jr. – bass
- Nathan Watts – bass
- Ollie E. Brown – drums
- James Gadson – drums
- Jeff Porcaro – drums
- Rick Shlosser – drums
- Joe Clayton – percussion
- Gary Coleman – percussion
- Paulinho da Costa – percussion
- Melvin Webb – percussion
- Herman Riley – alto sax solo (6)
- Bob Esty – arrangements (1)
- David Blumberg – arrangements (2, 6, 7)
- Marty Paich – arrangements (4, 9)
- Gene Page – arrangements (5)
- Oma Drake – backing vocals
- Joe Greene – backing vocals
- Jesse Kirkland – backing vocals
- Mike Reed – backing vocals
- Stephanie Spruill – backing vocals
- Julia Tillman Waters – backing vocals
- Maxine Willard Waters – backing vocals
- Oren Waters – backing vocals
- Syreeta Wright – backing vocals
- Mona Lisa Young – backing vocals
- Terry Young – backing vocals

=== Production ===
- Suzanne DePasse – executive producer
- Tony Jones – executive producer
- Jane Clark – engineer
- Guy Costa – engineer
- Joe Robb – engineer
- Allen Sides – engineer
- Russ Terrana – engineer, mastering
- Suzanne Coston – project manager
- Kevin Wright – engineer
- John Matousek – mastering
- Harry Langdon – photography
- Suzi Biles – stylist
- Wayne Masserelli – make-up
