= Live at the Roxy =

Live at the Roxy may refer to:

- Live at the Roxy (Bob Marley & The Wailers album), the posthumous live album recorded live in 1976 by Bob Marley
- Live at the Roxy (Bob Welch album), a 2004 live album by ex-Fleetwood Mac singer-songwriter Bob Welch
- Live at the Roxy (Eric Burdon album), a 1998 live album by Eric Burdon
- Live at the Roxy (Pete Yorn album), a 2001 live album by Pete Yorn
- Live at the Roxy (Social Distortion album), a 1998 live album by Social Distortion
- Live at the Roxy (The Tragically Hip album), a 2022 live album by The Tragically Hip
- Live at the Roxy, a 1979 live album by Van Morrison
- Live at the Roxy, a 1996 live album by Michel Polnareff
- Too Hot for Snakes (Live at the Roxy), a 1991 live album by Mick Taylor and Carla Olson
- Live at the Roxy Theatre, a 2000 live album by Brian Wilson
- Live at the Roxy 25.9.14, a 2015 live album by Slash featuring Myles Kennedy and The Conspirators
- Live at the Roxy, London – April 1st & 2nd 1977/Live at CBGB Theatre, New York – July 18th 1978, a 2006 live album by Wire
