= On the Air (album) =

Studio album by Billy Preston
- Released: February 18, 1984
- Recorded: October–December 1983
- Studio: Skyline Recording (Topanga, California); The Automatt (San Francisco, California)
- Genre: Soul
- Length: 39:25
- Label: Megatone (1984); Unidisc (1996)
- Producer: Billy Preston, Ralph Benatar, Galen Senogles

Billy Preston chronology
Pressin' On (1981)	On the Air (1984)	You Can't Keep a Good Man Down (1986)

Professional ratings
Review scores
Source	Rating
AllMusic	3/5 stars

On the Air is the sixteenth studio album by American musician Billy Preston, released on February 18, 1984, by Megatone Records.

== Track listing ==
1. "And Dance [Extended]" (Billy Preston, Bruce Fisher) – 6:01
2. "Kick-It" (Preston, Ralph Benatar) – 5:47
3. "Come to Me Little Darlin'" (Benatar, Enzo Bilinelli, Preston, Galen Senogles) – 3:43
4. "Beatle Tribute" (Benatar, Preston, Senogles) – 3:21
5. "If You Let Me Love You" (Benatar, Bilinelli, Fisher, Preston, Senogles) – 4:23
6. "You Can't Hide from Love" (Preston, Fisher) – 3:35
7. "Oh Jamaica" (Benatar, Ken Lazarus, Preston, Senogles) – 3:49
8. "Here, There and Everywhere" (John Lennon, Paul McCartney) – 4:03
9. "And Dance" (Preston, Fisher) – 5:43

== Personnel ==
- Billy Preston – vocals, keyboards, backing vocals, arrangements
- Ralph Benatar – acoustic guitars, flute, saxophones, arrangements
- Larry Lingle – electric guitars
- James "Tip" Wirrick – scratching
- Keni Burke – electric bass
- Bobby Vega – electric bass
- Paulinho da Costa – percussion
- Merry Clayton – backing vocals
- Doug Gibbs – backing vocals
- Joe Greene – backing vocals
- Jesse Kirkland – backing vocals
- Gloria Jones – backing vocals (6)
- Frankie K. Springs – backing vocals (6)
- Sondra "Blinky" Williams – backing vocals (6)

== Production ==
- Enzo Billinelli – executive producer
- Ralph Benatar – producer
- Billy Preston – producer
- Galen Senogles – producer, recording engineer, mixing (5–8)
- Ken Kessie – engineer (1–4), mixing (1–4)
- Marty Blecman – mixing (1–4)
- Maureen Drowny – second engineer (1–4)
- Rob Klein – recording assistant, mix assistant (5–8)
- Jose Rodriguez – mastering at Sterling Sound (New York City, New York)
- Jim Saunders – album graphics, design
- Garry Gay – photography
- David Willers – lithography
- Barbara McGee – make-up
- Sahara – hair stylist
