= Space Race (Billy Preston song) =

Single by Billy Preston

from the album Everybody Likes Some Kind of Music
- B-side: "We're Gonna Make It"
- Released: September 1973
- Genre: Funk
- Length: 3:21
- Label: A&M
- Songwriter: Billy Preston
- Producer: Billy Preston

Billy Preston singles chronology
| "Will It Go Round in Circles" (1973) | "Space Race" (1973) | "You're So Unique" (1974) |

Official Audio
- "Space Race" on YouTube

"Space Race" is an instrumental track by Billy Preston, released as a single in 1973 on the A&M label. It was taken from Preston's 1973 album Everybody Likes Some Kind of Music, and "Space Race" was awarded a gold record.

== Chart performance ==
The single, a sequel to his 1972 hit, "Outa-Space", reached number one on the R&B chart for one week and number four on the Pop Singles chart.

== Personnel ==
- Billy Preston – vocals, keyboards, bass guitar, producer
- David T. Walker – guitar
- Hubert Heard, Kenneth Lupper – keyboards
- Paul Riser – string and horn arrangements
- Manuel Kellough – drums
- Tommy Vicari – engineer

== Popular culture ==
- The instrumental proved popular enough that the musical variety show American Bandstand used it as the song for its mid-broadcast break from the mid-1970s until the show completed its run in 1989.
- The song can also be heard in a party scene in the 1979 film When a Stranger Calls.
