= It's My Pleasure =

Studio album by Billy Preston
- Released: 20 June 1975 (US); 19 July 1975 (UK)
- Recorded: 1975 at Kendun Recorders, Burbank and Centaur Electronic Music Centre
- Genre: Soul, rock
- Length: 39:20
- Label: A&M
- Producer: Billy Preston, Robert Margouleff, Malcolm Cecil

Billy Preston chronology
| The Kids & Me (1974) | It's My Pleasure (1975) | Billy Preston (1976) |

Professional ratings
Review scores
| Source | Rating |
|---|---|
| AllMusic | 3/5 stars |

It's My Pleasure is the tenth studio album by Billy Preston, released in June 1975 (July in the UK) on A&M Records. The album shows the modernisation of Preston's music, placing a heavier emphasis on synthesizers. It was also his first collaboration with the singer Syreeta Wright who sings on one track. The album is notable for featuring harmonica by Stevie Wonder on two tracks. George Harrison (credited as "Hari Georgeson") also appears, playing guitar on "That's Life".

"Song of Joy" would later be covered by Preston's A&M label mates Captain & Tennille for their album of the same name.

== Track listing ==
All songs by Billy Preston, except where noted.

Side one − Program

1. "Fancy Lady" (Preston, Syreeta Wright) – 5:40
2. "Found the Love" – 3:58
3. "That's Life" – 3:36
4. "Do It While You Can" (Preston, Bruce Fisher) – 6:42

Side two − Intermission

5. "It's My Pleasure" – 3:51
6. "Song of Joy" – 3:22
7. "I Can't Stand It" – 6:23
8. "All of My Life" (Preston, Russ Rasputin) – 5:52

== Personnel ==
- Billy Preston – vocals, keyboards, piano
- George Harrison – guitar (3, credited as "Hari Georgeson")
- Tony Maiden – guitar (8)
- Shuggie Otis – guitar (2, 4, 7)
- Kenny Burke – bass guitar (8), guitar (5, 8)
- Reggie McBride – bass guitar (2, 4, 7)
- Stevie Wonder – harmonica (4, 5)
- Syreeta Wright – vocals (1)
- Ollie E. Brown – drums, percussion (1–5, 7, 8)
- Rocky Dijon – congas (1)
- Lorna Maxine Waters – backing vocals
- Julia Waters – backing vocals
- Luther Waters – backing vocals
- Oren Waters – backing vocals
- Malcolm Cecil, Robert Margouleff (TONTO: The Original New Timbral Orchestra) – synthesizers

=== Technical ===
- Junie Osaki - art direction
- Benno Friedman - photography
