= Billy Preston (album) =

Studio album by Billy Preston
- Released: October 1976
- Recorded: March 1976
- Studio: Indigo Ranch, Malibu with the Record Plant Mobile
- Genre: Soul, rock
- Length: 36:02
- Label: A&M
- Producer: Billy Preston, Robert Margouleff

Billy Preston chronology
It's My Pleasure (1975)	Billy Preston (1976)	A Whole New Thing (1977)

Professional ratings
Review scores
Source	Rating
AllMusic	3/5 stars

Billy Preston (sometimes referred to Do What You Want) is the eleventh studio album by American soul musician Billy Preston, released in 1976 on A&M Records. It includes the singles "I've Got the Spirit" and "Girl", both of which were top 50 hits on Billboard's Soul Singles chart in the US. Preston recorded the album in Malibu, California in March 1976, shortly before joining the Rolling Stones on their two-month European tour.

The song "Do What You Want" is a remake of the 1969 original from Preston's debut album for Apple Records, That's the Way God Planned It. Two other tracks, "Let the Music Play" and "When You Are Mine", are re-recordings of songs that appeared on Preston's 1970 album Encouraging Words. In a 1974 interview for the NME, Preston said that he and George Harrison, his former producer, were "both convinced that some of those Apple cuts were among the best I've ever done and could still have a chance of being hits. They missed out first time around largely because of the internal dissension at Apple."

== Track listing ==
All songs by Billy Preston, except where noted.

Side one

1. "Do What You Want" – 2:56
2. "Girl" (Preston, Bruce Fisher) – 3:15
3. "Bells" (Preston, Fisher) – 3:20
4. "I've Got the Spirit" (Preston, Doug Jones) – 3:57
5. "When You Are Mine" – 2:48

Side two

1. "Bad Case of Ego" – 2:56
2. "Take Time to Figure It Out" (Preston, Jones) – 3:14
3. "Let the Music Play" (Preston, Jesse Kirkland) – 3:00
4. "Simplify Your Life" (George Johnson, Louis Johnson) – 3:46
5. "Let's Make Love" (Preston, Fisher) – 2:46
6. "Ecstasy" – 4:04

== Personnel ==
- Billy Preston - Hammond organ, piano, organ, Hohner Clavinet, synthesizers, Hohner Pianet, vocals
- Jeff Beck - lead guitar on "Bad Case of Ego"
- Steve Beckmeier - guitars
- Ollie E. Brown: Drums
- Keni Burke - bass guitar
- Merry Clayton - backing vocals
- Olivia Foster - backing vocals
- George Johnson - bass on "Simplify Your Life"
- Tony Maiden - rhythm guitar on "Bad Case of Ego"
- Stephanie Spruill - percussion, backing vocals
- Alvin Taylor - drums
- Tower of Power Horn Section:

Greg Adams - flugelhorn, trumpet
Emilio Castillo - tenor saxophone
Mic Gillette - flugelhorn, trumpet, piccolo
Steve Kupka - baritone saxophone
Lenny Pickett - tenor saxophone

- Malcolm Cecil - synthesizer programming

Technical

- Norman Seeff - photography
