= Billy Preston & Syreeta =

1981 album by Billy Preston and Syreeta

Studio album by Billy Preston and Syreeta
- Released: 1981
- Studios: Motown/Hitsville U.S.A. Recording Studios (Los Angeles, California); Amerycan Studios (North Hollywood, California), Kendun Recorders (Burbank, California)
- Genres: R&B; soul
- Label: Motown
- Producers: Ollie E. Brown (tracks 1–3, 7 & 8); Carol Connors and David Shire (tracks 4 & 7); Michael Masser (tracks 5, 6, 9 & 10)

Billy Preston chronology
The Way I Am (1981)	Billy Preston & Syreeta (1981)	Pressin' On (1982)

Syreeta Wright chronology
Set My Love in Motion (1981)	Billy Preston & Syreeta (1981)	The Spell (1983)

Billy Preston & Syreeta is a 1981 album of duets by Billy Preston and Syreeta released by Motown. Six songs were produced by Ollie Brown, and four songs were produced and co-written by Michael Masser. An expanded version of the album with 10 songs and 7 bonus cuts was released on CD in late 2013 on SoulMusic Records.

== Track listing ==
=== Side A ===
1. "Someone Special" (Greg Beck, Ollie E. Brown, Renee Moore) – 4:15
2. "Searchin'" (Brown) – 4:35
3. "Just for You" (Brown, Billy Preston, Michael McGloiry, Syreeta Wright) – 5:15
4. "It's So Easy" (Carol Connors, David Shire) – 3:41
5. "A Long and Lasting Love" (Gerry Goffin, Michael Masser) – 3:38

=== Side B ===
1. "Love" (Michael Masser, Randy Goodrum) – 4:06
2. "One More Try" (Allee Willis, Lauren Wood) – 4:07
3. "Hey You" (Billy Preston, Keith Boyd Jr.) – 4:04
4. "A New Way to Say I Love You" (Goffin, Masser) – 3:00
5. "What We Did for Love" (Masser, Goodrum) – 2:58
6. "With You I'm Born Again" (only orig. LP)

=== CD bonus cuts ===
1. "With You I'm Born Again" (US Motown 7" single) – 3:39
2. "With You I'm Born Again" (instrumental) – 5:06
3. "Go For It" – 3:53
4. "Go For It" (12" mix) – 8:53
5. "It Will Come in Time" – 3:09
6. "One More Time for Love" (Jerry Peters) – 3:51
7. "Please Stay" (Connors, Shire) – 3:58

== Personnel ==
- Billy Preston – lead vocals, backing vocals, acoustic piano (3), melodica (8)
- Syreeta – lead vocals, backing vocals (1–3, 7, 8)
- John Barnes – keyboards (1–3, 7, 8), synthesizers (1–3, 7, 8)
- Michael Boddicker – synthesizers (1–3, 7, 8)
- David Shire – pianos (4, 10)
- Randy Goodrum – pianos (5, 6, 6, 9, 10)
- Michael Masser – pianos (5, 6, 6, 9, 10), rhythm arrangements (5, 6, 9, 10)
- Paul Jackson Jr. – guitars (1–3, 7, 8)
- Michael McGloiry – guitars (1–3, 7, 8)
- Ray Parker Jr. – guitars (1–3, 7, 8)
- Melvin "Wah Wah" Ragin – guitars (1–3, 7, 8)
- Mitch Holder – guitars (4, 10)
- Tim May – guitars (5, 6, 9, 10)
- Nathan Watts – bass (1–3, 7, 8)
- Eddie N. Watkins Jr. – bass (4, 10)
- Leland Sklar – bass (5, 6, 9, 10)
- Ollie E. Brown – drums (1–4, 7, 8, 10), percussion (1–4, 7, 8, 10), rhythm arrangements (1–3, 7, 8), BGV arrangements (1–3, 7, 8)
- Rick Shlosser – drums (5, 6, 9, 10)
- Eddie "Bongo" Brown – congas (1–3, 7, 8)
- Gary Coleman – vibraphone (1–3, 7, 8)
- Steve Forman – percussion (4, 10)
- James Brown – flute (3), saxophone (7)
- Jerry Hey – horn arrangements (1–3, 7, 8)
- Sylvester Rivers – rhythm arrangements (1–3, 7, 8)
- Gene Page – string arrangements (1–3, 5–10)
- David Shire – rhythm and string arrangements (4, 10–14, 17)
- Barry Fasman – rhythm arrangements (5, 6, 9, 10)
- Harry Bluestone – conductor (1–3, 7, 8)
- Arnel Carmichael – backing vocals (1–3, 7, 8), BGV arrangements (1–3, 7, 8)
- James Anthony Carmichael – backing vocals (1–3, 7, 8)
- Sylvia Cox – backing vocals (1–3, 7, 8)
- Lynn Davis – backing vocals (1–3, 7, 8)
- Jim Gilstrap – backing vocals (1–3, 7, 8), BGV arrangements (1–3, 7, 8)
- Josie James – backing vocals (1–3, 7, 8)
- J.D. Nicholas – backing vocals (1–3, 7, 8)
- Deborah Thomas – backing vocals (1–3, 7, 8)
- Julia Tillman Waters – backing vocals (4, 10)
- Luther Waters – backing vocals (4, 10)
- Maxine Willard Waters – backing vocals (4, 10)
- Oren Waters – backing vocals (backing vocals (4, 10)
- Ginger Blake-Schackne – backing vocals (5, 6, 9, 10)
- Linda Dillard – backing vocals (5, 6, 9, 10)
- Becky Lopez – backing vocals (5, 6, 9, 10)

=== Production ===
- Suzanne DePasse – executive producer
- Tony Jones – executive producer
- F. Byron Clark – engineer, mixing
- Michael Schuman – engineer, mixing
- Russ Terrana – engineer, mixing
- Ollie E. Brown – mixing
- Bobby Brooks – additional engineer
- Barney Perkins – additional engineer
- Tony Autore – assistant engineer
- Steve Catania – assistant engineer
- Tom Cummings – assistant engineer
- Fred Law – assistant engineer
- Ginny Pallante – assistant engineer
- Johnny Lee – art direction
- Terry Taylor – design
- Harry Langdon – photography

Expanded reissue

- David Nathan – reissue producer
- David Shire – producer (11–14, 17)
- James Di Pasquale – producer (11–14)
- Billy Preston – producer (15, 17)
- Jerry Peters – producer (16)
- Alan Wilson – remastering
- Roger Williams – artwork, design
- Sharon Davis – liner notes
