= Late at Night (Billy Preston album) =

Studio album by Billy Preston
- Released: 1979
- Recorded: 1977–1979
- Studios: Motown (Los Angeles, California); Kendun (Burbank, California).
- Genre: Soul
- Length: 39:35
- Label: Motown
- Producers: Billy Preston; David Shire and James Di Pasquale on "With You I'm Born Again"

Billy Preston chronology
A Whole New Thing (1977)	Late at Night (1979)	The Way I Am (1981)

Late at Night is a studio album by Billy Preston, released in 1979, and his debut for Motown Records. It includes his hit duet with Syreeta Wright, "With You I'm Born Again", from the film Fast Break. The album peaked at No. 49 on the Billboard 200.

== Critical reception ==
Professional ratings
Review scores
Source	Rating
AllMusic	2/5 stars
Music Week	3/4 stars
Omaha World-Herald	4/5 stars
The Virgin Encyclopedia of R&B and Soul	3/5 stars

The Omaha World-Herald wrote that "Preston's strutting music often has a Ray Charles feel."

== Track listing ==
1. "Give It Up, Hot" (Billy Preston, Ronnie Vann, Bruce Fisher) – 5:59
2. "Late at Night" (Preston, Jesse Kirkland, Joe Greene) – 4:49
3. "All I Wanted Was You" (Preston, Carol Connors) – 4:43
4. "You" (Preston, Gloria Jones, Richard Jones) – 4:25
5. "I Come to Rest in You" (Preston, Guy Finley) – 3:52
6. "It Will Come in Time" (Preston) – 4:57
7. "Lovely Lady" (Preston, Jack Ackerman) – 3:52
8. "With You I'm Born Again" (David Shire, Carol Connors) – 3:38
9. "Sock-It, Rocket" (Preston) – 3:10

== Personnel ==
- Billy Preston – vocals, piano, organ, synthesizers, melodica, harpsichord (2), rhythm guitar (2), backing vocals (2, 4–7, 9), arrangements (2, 3, 7, 9)
- Paul Jackson Jr., David T. Walker – guitar
- Keni Burke, Robert Lee Hill, Chuck Rainey – bass guitar
- Ollie E. Brown, James Gadson – drums
- Bobbye Hall – percussion
- Bobby Keys – saxophone
- Dorothy Ashby – harp
- David Blumberg – arrangements (1, 4–7, 9)
- David Shire – arrangements (8)
- Harry Bluestone – concertmaster
- Maxayn Lewis – backing vocals (1, 3)
- Scherrie Payne – backing vocals (1, 3)
- Joe Greene – backing vocals (2, 7)
- Jesse Kirkland – backing vocals (2, 7)
- Bruce Fisher – backing vocals (4, 5, 6, 9)
- Gloria Jones – backing vocals (4, 5, 6, 9)
- Richard Jones – backing vocals (4, 5, 6, 9)
- Bobby King – backing vocals (4, 5, 6, 9)
- Phyllis St. James – backing vocals (4, 5, 6, 9)
- Syreeta Wright – vocals (6, 8)

Production

- F. Byron Clark – associate producer, engineer, mixing
- James Warmack – assistant engineer
- Steve Williams – assistant engineer
- Bob Winard – assistant engineer
- Russ Terrana – remix engineer, mastering
- Jack Andrews – mastering
- Suzanne Coston – project manager
- Ed Caraeff Studio – art direction, design, photography
