= That's the Way God Planned It (song) =

- UK picture sleeve

Single by Billy Preston

from the album That's the Way God Planned It
- B-side: "What About You?"
- Released: 27 June 1969
- Genre: Gospel, rock
- Length: 5:34 (album version); 3:22 (single version)
- Label: Apple
- Songwriter: Billy Preston
- Producer: George Harrison

Billy Preston singles chronology
"Get Back" (1969)	"That's the Way God Planned It" (1969)	"Everything's All Right" (1969)

"That's the Way God Planned It" is a song by American musician Billy Preston and the title track to his 1969 album of the same name. Issued as a single, the song was Preston's first release on the Beatles' Apple record label, following his guest role on the band's "Get Back" single. The lyrics to "That's the Way God Planned It" partly reflect the long musical apprenticeship Preston had served since childhood, mentored by artists such as Sam Cooke and Ray Charles, while musically the track combines the gospel tradition with rock. Produced by George Harrison in London, the recording also features contributions from Eric Clapton, Keith Richards, Ginger Baker and Doris Troy. Having been edited down to three minutes for its single release, the full version appeared on the album, as "That's the Way God Planned It (Parts 1 & 2)".

"That's the Way God Planned It" became an international hit, peaking at number 11 on the UK Singles Chart, and is one of Preston's best-known songs. Backed again by Harrison and Clapton, Preston sang it at the Concert for Bangladesh in August 1971 – a high-spirited performance that several commentators regard as a highlight of that historic show, after its inclusion in the 1972 concert film. The single then charted for a second time on the Billboard Hot 100 when reissued by Apple in the United States.

An early recording of the song, also from Preston's 1969 sessions in London, was included as a bonus track on the 1991 and 2010 remastered That's the Way God Planned It album. The 2002 reissue of Preston's Live European Tour album added a live version of "That's the Way God Planned It", recorded during the Rolling Stones' 1973 European tour.

== Background and composition ==
Everything that's happened to me has been the way God planned it because I never auditioned … I never worked any other job but music and people would call me to work with them … I feel it was a blessing. And this is the way God planned it.

— Billy Preston

A child prodigy, Billy Preston had worked as a backing musician for artists such as Mahalia Jackson, Little Richard and Ray Charles, and recorded for Vee Jay Records, before participating in the January 1969 sessions for the Beatles' Let It Be film project. Having provided a steadying influence during this troubled period in the Beatles' career, Preston received an unprecedented artist credit on their "Get Back" single that April, as well as a recording contract with the band's Apple record label.

In his liner notes to the 2010 reissue of That's the Way God Planned It, Preston's first Apple album, music journalist Andy Davis refers to the American musician's extended "apprenticeship", and quotes from a 1975 interview in which Preston said: "I’ve never asked anybody to help me or give me a break. What I don't have now I believe will come. Why? I have to say it's God … the God in me." Davis describes these sentiments as the "lyrical thrust" behind Preston's composition "That's the Way God Planned It".

The song fuses the gospel and rock music genres. With regard to the lyrics' humanitarian message, author Simon Leng refers to the song's "unaffected naiveté", while recognising its compatibility with the direction that Beatles guitarist George Harrison was pursuing throughout the band's final years. Speaking at a fan convention in 1996, Preston credited Paul McCartney's composition "Let It Be" as his inspiration for writing "That's the Way God Planned It". Author John Winn notes similarities with both "Let It Be" and the middle-eight section of Harrison's composition "Something", which was also introduced during the Beatles' January 1969 sessions.

== Recording ==
After Apple had extricated him from his existing contract, with Capitol Records, Preston began recording the album with Harrison as his producer. An early version of "That's the Way God Planned It" was taped with Preston on piano and vocal, accompanied by Harrison (on guitar) and two unnamed musicians, on bass and drums. This take features a slower tempo than the official version and incomplete lyrics.

The session for the song took place at Olympic Sound Studios in south-west London in April 1969. Harrison asked Eric Clapton, Keith Richards and Ginger Baker to participate, about which Preston later said: "George said he'd invite some of his friends over to help out on my Apple debut, and I never dreamed he meant [Clapton, Richards and Baker]." Like Harrison, Richards had met Preston earlier in the 1960s, when the Rolling Stones appeared on the popular music show Shindig! in Los Angeles in May 1965.

With Preston on piano and Hammond organ, Harrison contributed the main electric guitar part, Richards played bass and Baker played drums; Clapton contributed the song's guitar solos. Musicologist Walter Everett highlights the start of the track among notable recordings on which the sustained striking of soft-headed mallets on crash cymbals "produce[s] a wonderful soft and shimmering roll", in this case generating "colorful interplay" with the organ part. On the unedited version of the song, released on Preston's album, the track ends with a double-time section in which Preston and Clapton exchange solos, on Hammond organ and guitar, respectively.

The song's gospel-style backing vocals were sung by American singers Doris Troy and Madeline Bell, both of whom had recently supplied a gospel chorus to the Rolling Stones' song "You Can't Always Get What You Want". Long a fan of Troy's own recordings, Harrison signed her as an Apple Records artist, producer and songwriter soon after this Preston session.

== Release and reissues ==
Apple issued "That's the Way God Planned It" as a single on 27 June 1969 in the United Kingdom (as Apple 12) and on 14 July in the United States (as Apple 1808). The B-side was "What About You?", which Harrison also produced.

"That's the Way God Planned It" peaked at number 11 on the UK Singles Chart, for two weeks. It reached number 7 on Melody Maker's national chart and on Disc and Music Echo's chart. The song also placed in the top 30 on singles charts in Ireland, Australia, the Netherlands and New Zealand, and peaked at number 62 on the Billboard Hot 100 in America and number 61 on Canada's RPM listings. In a 1979 interview, Preston attributed the single's comparative lack of success in North America to inexperience on the part of Apple Records, saying: "At that time, the company didn't really know how to promote – because you didn't have to promote a Beatle record!"

The song appeared as the final track on That's the Way God Planned It, released in August 1969. Titled "That's the Way God Planned It (Parts 1 & 2)", this version extended to 5:34 in length compared to the 3:22 edit on the single. In his liner notes for the album, Apple press officer Derek Taylor described Preston as "the best thing to happen to Apple this year", adding: "He's young and beautiful and kind and he sings and plays like the son of God."

Apple reissued the single in the United States in 1972, by which point Preston had left the label for A&M Records and was enjoying his first major US chart success. The release took place on 26 June 1972 and the song returned to the Billboard Hot 100, peaking at number 65. After an initial release on CD in November 1991, That's the Way God Planned It was remastered and reissued in October 2010, as part of the Apple Box Set. Both of these reissues added the slower, early version of "That's the Way God Planned It". The original single edit also appeared on Apple's multi-artist compilation Come and Get It: The Best of Apple Records. In 2012, the song was covered by Ivan Kelley, Jr. in the film Joyful Noise, starring Dolly Parton and Queen Latifah.

== Reception ==
Writing in the NME in July 1969, Richard Green described the single as an "amazing record", adding: "If ever there was a 'natural' for the charts, Billy Preston's 'That's The Way God Planned It' … is it." In Melody Maker, Chris Welch wrote: "this is superb, with Clappers and Peter Edward [Baker] playing in relaxed but heavy style, and Billy singing with full maturity. Destined to be a mammoth hit." Billboard magazine's reviewer said: "Preston's move to the Apple label proves a strong one via this blockbuster blues item with meaningful lyric line. Driving rhythm backs the potent vocal workout." In his role as "Hit Talk" columnist for Disc and Music Echo in August, Desmond Dekker described the song as "catchy" and said Preston was "very talented" and a "good Beatles discovery".

More recently, AllMusic critic Bruce Eder has written of "That's the Way God Planned It": "one of the best production jobs that Harrison ever delivered; aglow in a swelling gospel-style organ and rippling with bluesy electric guitar, a chorus soaring high over all of that, and Preston's career-defining vocal performance at its center, the song was irresistible."

Reviewing the 2010 reissue of That's the Way God Planned It, Joe Marchese of The Second Disc describes the song as an "anthemic title track" that "quickly establishes its own identity" after the initial similarity with "Let It Be". Writing in Rolling Stone that year, David Fricke opined: "[Preston] would have bigger hits in the Seventies but never make a better one than this album's rapturous title track …" In Blues & Soul magazine, Sharon Davis wrote that, from Preston's beginnings as a child prodigy, the song "really elevated Billy into the mainstream record market, bringing to the fore his remarkable pedigree".

== Live versions ==
=== Performance at the Concert for Bangladesh ===
Preston (at the microphone) performing the song at the Concert for Bangladesh, August 1971

Although he left Apple midway through 1971, as a result of business issues related to the Beatles' break-up, Preston continued to work with Harrison throughout the 1970s. In response to a request from the former Beatle, Preston agreed to play at the Concert for Bangladesh on 1 August 1971, to raise funds and awareness for refugees of the Bangladesh Liberation War. Preston joined a large band that included Harrison, Clapton, Ringo Starr, Leon Russell and backing singers such as Claudia Lennear and Joe Greene, the last of whom co-wrote some of the songs on Preston's first A&M album, I Wrote a Simple Song. Two shows were held that day, at Madison Square Garden in New York, at each of which Preston performed a rousing version of "That's the Way God Planned It". The performance from the evening show, which appeared on the live album of the event and in the 1972 concert film, ended with Preston leaving his seat behind the Hammond organ and dancing across the front of the stage, delighting the New York audience. Preston later recalled of this spontaneous act: "I got happy … The band was jamming and it was pumping, the people were with us – and, you know, I just had to rejoice!"

In his review of the live album, for Rolling Stone, Jon Landau described "That's the Way God Planned It" as "sheer delight" and remarked: "The song is beautiful and while some of its musical force is lost at the end, when Preston was too busy playing with the song visually to sustain his vocal, it nonetheless remains one of the true highpoints of the album." In Melody Maker, Richard Williams wrote that Preston "whips the band into a feverishly exciting" performance, adding: "Towards the end, as Billy dances across the stage the band speeds up and the audience goes absolutely wild."

Referring to the song's segment in the concert film, Justin Gerber of Consequence of Sound praises Preston's showmanship and suggests that this "powerful" live version "could cause pause for a non-believer" as the singer undertakes "a full-on dance of someone who has seen the light". Similarly impressed, Nigel Williamson of Uncut writes of Preston "giving the performance of his life" on the song. In his book 1,000 Recordings to Hear Before You Die, Tom Moon opines that the triple live album "is worth the retail price just for that track", which he describes as "pure bolts of energy, live on stage".

=== Live European Tour ===
The song continued to be a highlight of Preston's concert performances. In a report for Blues & Soul on the London press launch for I Wrote a Simple Song, David Nathan wrote: "No [Preston] show would be complete without his British hit, 'That's The Way God Planned It' …" Nathan remarked of this song and Preston's cover of the Harrison-written "My Sweet Lord": "Billy Preston is one of the very few artists who manage to draw out all the power of gospel music and pour it into their stage performance, and religious beliefs completely transcend the whole impact of his work …"

A regular keyboard player with the Rolling Stones during the 1970s, Preston included "That's the Way God Planned It" in his solo spot on the band's 1973 European tour. Among his backing musicians, collectively titled "the God Squad", was Mick Taylor, the Rolling Stones' lead guitarist. Although it did not appear on Preston's Live European Tour album, released the following year, a live version of the song was included on A&M Japan's 2002 reissue of that album.

== Personnel ==
- Billy Preston – vocals, piano, Hammond organ
- George Harrison – electric guitar
- Eric Clapton – electric guitar
- Keith Richards – bass
- Ginger Baker – drums
- Doris Troy – backing vocals
- Madeline Bell – backing vocals

== Chart positions ==
Chart (1969)	Peak position
Australian Go-Set National Top 40	22
Canadian RPM 100	61
Dutch Singles Chart	14
Irish Singles Chart	12
New Zealand Listener	14
UK Singles Chart	11
US Billboard Hot 100	62

== Sources ==
- Keith Badman, The Beatles Diary Volume 2: After the Break-Up 1970–2001, Omnibus Press (London, 2001; ISBN 0-7119-8307-0).
- Harry Castleman & Walter J. Podrazik, All Together Now: The First Complete Beatles Discography 1961–1975, Ballantine Books (New York, NY, 1976; ISBN 0-345-25680-8).
- Alan Clayson, George Harrison, Sanctuary (London, 2003; ISBN 1-86074-489-3).
- Stephen Davis, Old Gods Almost Dead: The 40-Year Odyssey of the Rolling Stones, Broadway Books (New York, NY, 2001; ISBN 0-7679-0312-9).
- Peter Doggett, You Never Give Me Your Money: The Beatles After the Breakup, It Books (New York, NY, 2011; ISBN 978-0-06-177418-8).
- Walter Everett, The Foundations of Rock: From "Blue Suede Shoes" to "Suite: Judy Blue Eyes", Oxford University Press (New York, NY; ISBN 978-0-19-531024-5).
- Simon Leng, While My Guitar Gently Weeps: The Music of George Harrison, Hal Leonard (Milwaukee, WI, 2006; ISBN 1-4234-0609-5).
- Barry Miles, The Beatles Diary Volume 1: The Beatles Years, Omnibus Press (London, 2001; ISBN 0-7119-8308-9).
- Tom Moon, 1,000 Recordings to Hear Before You Die, Workman Publishing (New York, NY, 2008; ISBN 978-0-7611-5385-6) .
- Robert Rodriguez, Fab Four FAQ 2.0: The Beatles' Solo Years, 1970–1980, Backbeat Books (Milwaukee, WI, 2010; ISBN 978-1-4165-9093-4).
- Stuart Shea & Robert Rodriguez, Fab Four FAQ: Everything Left to Know About the Beatles … and More!, Hal Leonard (New York, NY, 2007; ISBN 978-1-4234-2138-2).
- Patricia Romanowski & Holly George-Warren (eds), The New Rolling Stone Encyclopedia of Rock & Roll, Fireside/Rolling Stone Press (New York, NY, 1995; ISBN 0-684-81044-1).
- Bruce Spizer, The Beatles Solo on Apple Records, 498 Productions (New Orleans, LA, 2005; ISBN 0-9662649-5-9).
- John C. Winn, That Magic Feeling: The Beatles' Recorded Legacy, Volume Two, 1966–1970, Three Rivers Press (New York, NY, 2009; ISBN 978-0-307-45239-9).
- Bill Wyman, Rolling with the Stones, Dorling Kindersley (London, 2002; ISBN 0-7513-4646-2).
