= The Most Exciting Organ Ever =

Studio album by Billy Preston
- Released: January 1965
- Recorded: September 1964
- Genre: Soul
- Length: 33:11
- Label: Vee-Jay
- Producer: Steve Douglas

Billy Preston chronology
16 Yr. Old Soul (1963)	The Most Exciting Organ Ever (1965)	Early Hits of 1965 (1965)

The Most Exciting Organ Ever is the second album by Billy Preston. The fully instrumental album was released in January 1965. The album includes "Billy's Bag", which was a favorite among British musicians and club-goers at the time. Preston included a live version of the track on his 1974 album Live European Tour.

Extra songs recorded during the sessions for The Most Exciting Organ Ever were released on Preston's next studio album.

Professional ratings
Review scores
Source	Rating
AllMusic	4/5 stars
Encyclopedia of Popular Music	3/5 stars

== Track listing ==
All songs by Billy Preston, except where noted.

1. "If I Had a Hammer" (Lee Hays, Pete Seeger) – 2:54
2. "Low Down" – 2:13
3. "Slippin' and Slidin'" (Richard Penniman, Edwin Bocage, Al Collins, James Smith) – 3:06
4. "Drown in My Own Tears" (Henry Glover) – 3:24
5. "I Am Coming Through" – 2:04
6. "The Octopus" – 2:13
7. "Don't Let the Sun Catch You Cryin'" (Joe Greene) – 2:30
8. "Soul Meetin'" (Don Covay) – 2:42
9. "Let Me Know" (Ted Wright) – 2:05
10. "Billy's Bag" – 3:48
11. "The Masquerade Is Over" (Herbert Magidson, Allie Wrubel) – 4:20
12. "Steady Gettin' It" – 2:50
