= A Whole New Thing (Billy Preston album) =

Studio album by Billy Preston
- Released: November 1977
- Recorded: 10–31 January 1977
- Studios: Kendun Recorders, (Burbank, California); The Village Recorder (Westwood, Los Angeles)
- Genre: Soul
- Length: 34:35
- Label: A&M
- Producers: Billy Preston, Truman Thomas

Billy Preston chronology
Billy Preston (1976)	A Whole New Thing (1977)	Late at Night (1979)

Professional ratings
Review scores
Source	Rating
AllMusic	3/5 stars
The New Rolling Stone Record Guide	2/5 stars

A Whole New Thing is a studio album by Billy Preston, released in 1977. It was Preston's final album with A&M Records.

"Wide Stride" was released as a single in 1977 and peaked at number 33 on the US R&B chart.

== Track listing ==
Side one

1. "Whole New Thing" (Truman Thomas, Jeffrey Bowen, James Ford) – 3:35
2. "Disco Dancin'" (Billy Preston) – 3:30
3. "Complicated Sayings" (Preston, Robert "Inky" Incorvaia) – 2:54
4. "Attitudes" instrumental (Preston) – 2:29
5. "I'm Really Gonna Miss You" (Preston) – 3:48

Side two

1. "Wide Stride" instrumental (Preston) – 3:15
2. "You Got Me Buzzin'" (Preston, Incorvaia) – 2:42
3. "Sweet Marie" (Preston, Joe Greene) – 3:40
4. "Happy" instrumental (Preston) – 2:20
5. "Touch Me Love" (Preston, Jack Ackerman) – 3:22
6. "You Don't Have to Go" (Preston, Greene) – 3:00

The Japan SHM CD has One bonus track "Get Back"

== Personnel ==
- Billy Preston – vocals (1–5, 7–11), keyboards, guitars, bass, percussion
- Kenny Moore – keyboards
- Truman Thomas – keyboards
- Eugene Henderson – guitars
- Tony Maiden – guitars
- Michael McGloiry – guitars
- Welton Gite – bass
- Keni Burke – bass
- Ollie E. Brown – drums
- Manuel Kellough – drums
- Alvin Taylor – drums
- Bobbye Hall – percussion
- Wynell Montgomery – saxophones
- Charles Garnett – trumpet
- Angelo Richards – trumpet
- Andre Crough – backing vocals (1–5, 7–11)
- Joe Greene – backing vocals (1–5, 7–11)
- Gloria Jones – backing vocals (1–5, 7–11)
- Clydie King – backing vocals (1–5, 7–11)
- Frankie Spring – backing vocals (1–5, 7–11)

== Production ==
- Truman Thomas – producer (1, 3, 7)
- Billy Preston – producer (2, 4–6, 8–11)
- Michael Schuman – recording, final mix engineer
- Roland Young – art direction
- Chuck Beeson – design
- Moshe Brakha – photography
