= Will It Go Round in Circles =

- Side A of the US single

Single by Billy Preston

from the album Music Is My Life
- B-side: "Blackbird"
- Released: March 1973
- Genre: Funk, soul
- Length: 3:42 (single version); 4:28 (album version)
- Label: A&M
- Songwriters: Billy Preston, Bruce Fisher
- Producer: Billy Preston

Billy Preston singles chronology
"Slaughter" (1972)	"Will It Go Round in Circles" (1973)	"Space Race" (1974)

Official audio
- "Will It Go Round In Circles" on YouTube

"Will It Go Round in Circles" is a song by American soul musician Billy Preston from his 1972 album Music Is My Life. It was written by Preston and Bruce Fisher and released as a single in March 1973. The record topped the Billboard Hot 100 and sold over a million copies. This was the first of two number one hits for Preston as a solo performer, the other being "Nothing from Nothing", although he is also credited on the Beatles' 1969 hit "Get Back".

== Personnel ==
- Billy Preston – piano, vocals
- George Johnson – guitar
- Louis Johnson – bass guitar
- Hubert Heard – organ, melodica
- Manuel Kellough – drums
- Tom Scott – saxophone
- Jim Horn – saxophone
- George Bohanon – trombone
- Buck Monari – trumpet
- Paul Hubinon – trumpet

== Chart performance ==
=== Weekly charts ===
Chart (1973)	Peak position
Australia (Kent Music Report)	99
Canadian RPM 100	1
South Africa (Springbok)	20
US Billboard Hot 100	1
U.S. Billboard Hot Soul Singles	10

=== Year-end charts ===
Chart (1973)	Rank
Canadian RPM Year-End	18
U.S. Billboard Hot 100	8

=== All-time charts ===
Chart (1958–2018)	Position
US Billboard Hot 100	358

== Certifications ==
Region	Certification	Certified units/sales
United States (RIAA)	Gold	1,000,000^{^}
^{^} Shipments figures based on certification alone.

== Covers ==
The song was covered by Donny Osmond on his 2009 album Love Songs Of The '70s. Phish did two renditions in 1999, including on 10 September at The Gorge Amphitheatre. Orlando Brown recorded it for the 2006 soundtrack album That's So Raven Too!, for his Disney Channel series That's So Raven; his version was also featured in the Disney Channel original film Wendy Wu: Homecoming Warrior. The song was performed in Hebrew by Yehonatan Geffen and Dani Litani in their 1974 live show That's All for Now - For Now That's All.

In 2024 the Dave Matthews Band covered the song during their summer tour with Dave Matthews singing the first verse and keyboardist Buddy Strong taking over the chorus and closing.

== In popular culture ==
- The song appears in the soundtrack of the 1996 Matt Dillon film Beautiful Girls.
- The song is featured as the opening theme in the 1997 HBO Sports documentary Long Shots: The Life & Times of The American Basketball Association.
