= You Are So Beautiful =

1974 single by Billy Preston

Single by Billy Preston

from the album The Kids & Me
- A-side: "Struttin'"
- Released: November 1974
- Recorded: October 1973, Los Angeles, CA
- Genre: Soul
- Length: 4:55
- Label: A&M
- Songwriters: Billy Preston, Bruce Fisher
- Producer: Billy Preston

Audio
- "You Are So Beautiful" on YouTube

"You Are So Beautiful"
- Side A of the US single

Single by Joe Cocker

from the album I Can Stand a Little Rain
- B-side: "It's a Sin When You Love Somebody"
- Released: November 2, 1974
- Recorded: 1973
- Studio: The Village Recorder (Los Angeles, CA)
- Genre: Pop; soul
- Length: 2:39
- Label: A&M
- Songwriters: Billy Preston, Bruce Fisher
- Producer: Jim Price

Joe Cocker singles chronology
| "I Can Stand a Little Rain" (1974) | "You Are So Beautiful" (1974) | "It’s All Over But the Shoutin’" (1975) |

Audio
- "You Are So Beautiful" on YouTube

"You Are So Beautiful" is a song credited to Billy Preston and Bruce Fisher that was first released in 1974 on Preston's ninth studio album, The Kids & Me. It was also the B-side of his single "Struttin'". Later that same year, British singer Joe Cocker released a slower version of the song on his album I Can Stand a Little Rain. Cocker's version was produced by Jim Price, and released as a single in November 1974. It became Cocker's highest-charting solo hit in the United States, peaking at number five on the Billboard Hot 100 (Cocker's biggest hit on the US pop chart was "Up Where We Belong", a duet with Jennifer Warnes from the 1982 film An Officer and a Gentleman, which reached number 1), and at number four on Canada's Top Singles chart.

Although he remains uncredited by the publisher as of 2026, several sources assert that Dennis Wilson of the Beach Boys assisted Preston in completing the song by co-writing the lyrics and modifying part of the melody at a contemporaneous party. Wilson performed the song live with the Beach Boys (often as an encore with minimal accompaniment) from 1975 until his final performances with the group in 1983. Many artists have covered the song; Ray Stevens hit the US Country chart with his version. The song has also been featured in numerous movies, television shows, and ads.

== Background ==
Billy Preston wrote "You Are So Beautiful" with one of his regular collaborators, Bruce Fisher. Preston's inspiration was his mother, who worked as a stage actress. According to his friend Sam Moore (who had assumed it was a standard love song), Preston was appalled to learn that Moore was using the song as a means to attract young women each time he sang it in concert. In Moore's description, Preston told him: "That song's about my mother!" The composition interpolates part of Preston's 1969 song "Let Us All Get Together (Right Now)", which he wrote with soul singer Doris Troy.

=== Dennis Wilson ===
According to Beach Boys biographer Jon Stebbins, although Dennis Wilson is not credited as a writer, he helped Preston finish writing "You Are So Beautiful". Preston and Wilson are said to have collaborated on the song while attending a party where they discussed the concept of beauty. In the opinion of Craig Hlavaty, writing for Houston Press, while Wilson never sought to claim a share of the song's authorship, "if you check out Wilson's solo work, you can hear where Wilson's mind took over 'Beautiful.'"

Billy Hinsche, a close friend and longtime touring member of the Beach Boys, stated that he witnessed Preston and Wilson working on the song "out of the corner of my ear and the corner of my eye" at the party. He said that he was unaware of how much of the song Preston had already written prior to Wilson's involvement. "Maybe it was just [Wilson's] interpretation of the song. Later Dennis said to me, 'Well, you know, I helped write that song.'" In a 2004 interview, brother Brian Wilson denied Dennis was "one of the uncredited writers".

Dennis sang "You Are So Beautiful" (usually as an encore) at Beach Boys shows intermittently from 1975 until his final performances in 1983. A live rendition, circa 1978, and an edited 1983 live rendition both appear in the film The Beach Boys: An American Band (1985). A live version was released on the group's album Good Timin': Live at Knebworth England 1980 in 2002.

== Composition ==
"You Are So Beautiful" was originally published in the key of A♭ major in common time with a tempo of 70 beats per minute. Cocker's vocals span from B♭_{2} to E♭_{4}.

== Critical reception ==
Marc Lee of The Daily Telegraph noted the song's contemplative beginning, accompanied only by piano, followed by "lush strings" which "sweep in and carry [Cocker] off into passionate ecstasies". Lee commented that the song, one of Cocker's best-known works, was a good example of Cocker's ability to be both gentle and "gloriously stirring".

In 2016, the original recording of the song by Joe Cocker released in 1974 on the A&M label was inducted into the Grammy Hall of Fame.

== Live performances ==
Cocker performed the song along with Ray Charles in a 1983 television tribute to Charles, A Man and his Soul.

== Personnel ==
- Joe Cocker – lead vocals
- Nicky Hopkins – piano
- Dave McDaniel – bass
- Jimmy Webb – arrangements

== Charts ==
=== Weekly charts ===
| Chart (1975) | Peak position |
|---|---|
| Australian (Kent Music Report) | 32 |
| Canadian RPM Top Singles | 4 |
| Canada Adult Contemporary (RPM) | 10 |
| France (SNEP) | 70 |
| US Billboard Hot 100 | 5 |
| US Billboard Adult Contemporary | 12 |
| US Cash Box Top 100 | 4 |

=== Year-end charts ===
| Chart (1975) | Rank |
|---|---|
| Canadian RPM Top Singles | 53 |
| US Billboard Hot 100 | 67 |

== Certifications ==
| Region | Certification | Certified units/sales |
|---|---|---|
| New Zealand (RMNZ) | Platinum | 30,000^{‡} |
| United Kingdom (BPI) | Silver | 200,000^{‡} |
^{‡} Sales+streaming figures based on certification alone.

== Other renditions ==
Ray Stevens recorded it for his album Just for the Record (1976). Stevens' version reached number 16 on the Hot Countey Singles chart.

== Other use ==
- The song is also used in the evening gown competitions at Miss Universe in the 80s: Miss Universe 1983, Miss Universe 1984, Miss Universe 1985, and lastly, Miss Universe 1986.

== In other media ==
- The song was used in the end credits for the 1993 Brian De Palma film Carlito's Way.
- The song was heard in Two and a Half Men Season 4, Episode 23, ("Anteaters. They're Just Crazy-Lookin'"), sung by guest Enrique Iglesias.
- The song appears in a 2018 TV commercial for Toyota.
- In The Boys, as The Deep hallucinates that his gills are speaking (with Patton Oswalt's voice), they start singing the song, and he eventually goes along.
- In The Walking Dead season 10 episode "Here's Negan", Negan plays the song throughout the special, talking about how it was his wife Lucille's favorite.
