= Early Hits of 1965 =

Studio album by Billy Preston
- Released: 15 December 1965
- Recorded: March–September, 1965
- Genre: Soul
- Length: 24:20
- Label: Vee-Jay; VJLP/VJS 1145
- Producer: Steve Douglas
- Compiler: Billy Preston

Billy Preston chronology
| The Most Exciting Organ Ever (1965) | Early Hits of 1965 (1965) | Wildest Organ in Town! (1966) |

Early Hits of 1965, subtitled A Million Dollars Worth of Music!!! Played by the Greatest Organist Ever, is an album by Billy Preston performing soul arrangements of hit singles from that year recorded in the same sessions of The Most Exciting Organ Ever and originally released by the Vee-Jay label and re-released by Exodus Records the following year.

Professional ratings
Review scores
| Source | Rating |
|---|---|
| Allmusic | 3/5 stars |

== Track listing ==
1. "You've Lost That Lovin' Feelin'" (Phil Spector, Barry Mann, Cynthia Weil) – 2:20
2. "Eight Days a Week" (John Lennon, Paul McCartney) – 2:10
3. "Downtown" (Tony Hatch) – 2:40
4. "Goldfinger" (John Barry, Leslie Bricusse, Anthony Newley) – 2:20
5. "My Girl" (Smokey Robinson, Ronald White) – 2:??
6. "Go Now" (Larry Banks, Milton Bernett) – 2:45
7. "Ferry Cross the Mersey" (Gerry Marsden) – 2:52
8. "Shotgun" (Autry DeWalt) – 2:30
9. "Stop! In the Name of Love" (Holland–Dozier–Holland) – 2:26
10. "King of the Road" (Roger Miller) – 2:12
11. "The Birds and the Bees" (Barry Stuart) – 1:59
12. "Can't You Hear My Heartbeat?" (John Carter, Ken Lewis) – 2:02
