= Pressin' On =

Studio album by Billy Preston
- Released: 1982
- Studios: Salty Dog (Van Nuys, California); Evergreen (Burbank, California); Motown/Hitsville U.S.A. (Hollywood, California)
- Genres: Soul, R&B
- Label: Motown
- Producers: Billy Preston, Galen Senogles, Ralph Benatar, Artie Butler

Billy Preston chronology
Billy Preston & Syreeta (1981)	Pressin' On (1982)	On the Air (1984)

Professional ratings
Review scores
Source	Rating
AllMusic	2/5 stars
The Encyclopedia of Popular Music	2/5 stars

Pressin' On is a studio album by the American musician Billy Preston, released in 1982. It was his final album released on Motown Records, although he would briefly return to the label in 1986 to record one single ("Since I Held You Close"). The song "I'm Never Gonna Say Goodbye" was used for the Ed Asner/Jodie Foster film O'Hara's Wife. Norman Seeff was the photographer for the album's cover. The album was produced primarily by Preston, Galen Senogles, and Ralph Benatar.

== Track listing ==
1. "Pressin' On" (Benny Medina, Billy Preston, Kerry Ashby) - 5:15
2. "I'd Like to Go Back Home Again" (Medina, Preston, Ashby) - 5:05
3. "Loving You Is Easy ('Cause You're Beautiful)" (Preston) - 4:17
4. "Turn It Out" (Medina, Preston, Ashby) - 3:44
5. "I'm Never Gonna Say Goodbye" (Artie Butler, Molly Ann Leikin) - 3:39
6. "Thanks But No Thanks" (Ralph Benatar, Galen Senogles, Geoffrey Leib) - 3:54
7. "Don't Try to Fight It" (Benatar, Senogles) - 4:18
8. "I Love You So" (Preston) - 4:12
9. "I Come to Rest in You" (Preston, Guy Finley) - 3:52

== Personnel ==
- Billy Preston – vocals, keyboards, synthesizer, arrangements (1–4, 8)
- Bill Mays – additional keyboards
- Louis Johnson, Larry Lingle, Thom Rotella and David T. Walker – guitars
- Louis Johnson, Kenny Lee Lewis, Chuck Rainey and Neil Stubenhaus – bass guitar
- Gary Ferguson, James Gadson and Steve Schaeffer – drums
- Paulinho da Costa, Alan Estes, Victor Feldman and Bobbye Hall – percussion
- Dorothy Ashby – harp
- Heart Attack Horns – horns
- Ralph Benatar – horn and string arrangements, arrangements (1–4, 6, 7)
- David Blumberg – arrangements (9)
- William Henderson – concertmaster
- Maxi Anderson, Merry Clayton, Venetta Fields, Bunny Hull, Marlena Jeter, Sharon Robinson, Carla Vaughn, Tony Walthers, Julia Tillman Waters and Maxine Willard Waters – backing vocals

Production

- Tony James – executive producer
- Ralph Benatar – producer (1–4, 6, 7)
- Billy Preston – producer (1–4, 8, 9)
- Galen Senogles – producer (1–4, 6, 7), engineer
- Artie Butler – producer (5)
- Rick Riccio – engineer
- Russ Terrana – engineer
- Tony Autore, Dean Knight, Murray McFadden, Deborah Scott and James Warmack – assistant engineers
- Johnny Lee – art direction
- Ian Campbell – design
- Norman Seeff – photography
