= With You I'm Born Again =

Single by Billy Preston and Syreeta Wright

from the album Fast Break
- B-side: "All I Wanted Was You"
- Released: December 1979
- Genre: Soul
- Length: 3:38
- Label: Motown
- Songwriters: Carol Connors; David Shire
- Producer: James DiPasquale

Billy Preston and Syreeta Wright singles chronology
"It Will Come in Time" (1979)	"With You I'm Born Again" (1979)	"One More Time for Love" (1980)

"With You I'm Born Again" is a 1979 duet written by Carol Connors and David Shire that originated on the soundtrack of the 1979 motion picture Fast Break. It was performed by Motown recording artists Billy Preston and Syreeta Wright (credited as Syreeta) and became an international hit for the duo, reaching number four on the Billboard Hot 100 and number two on the UK singles chart.

== History ==
The music from Fast Break was credited to David Shire and James DiPasquale, and Carol Connors put words to four of the songs on the soundtrack album. Connors recalls, "I had written most of the lyrics to 'With You I'm Born Again' in 22 minutes, but I couldn't find two words and it was driving me crazy." The right words came to her on her way to an ice cream parlor, where she requested a pencil and paper along with her order. "I had finally found it—the line I was seeking--'Come show me your kindness, in your arms I know I'll find this'—and I wanted to get it down on paper."

Motown executive Suzanne de Passe chose Wright as Preston's partner for the two duets that had been written for the film, and each singer also had a solo number to cut for the soundtrack album as well. Connors recalled, "Billy and Syreeta were originally not very fond of the idea of recording together—they each wanted to do their own thing, but this worked out extremely well for both of them." The reluctant pair were surprised by the success of "With You I'm Born Again". "Though both liked the song, they never dreamed of it being a hit single."

Connors noted the impression some were left with by the song and Preston. "When David Shire heard Billy Preston play the song on the organ, he said to me, 'Now I know why he's a star.'" Connors also shared, "The late great Marvin Hamlisch told me that he was in the barber chair when he first heard the song on the radio and stood straight up in amazement, narrowly missing getting his throat cut by the scissors. True story."

But radio airplay and record sales almost never happened. The Fast Break soundtrack was released in early 1979, when disco still permeated the airwaves, and the other of the duo's recordings from the album, the dance tune "Go for It", was chosen as the single that would be issued to promote the album. That selection barely made a dent in the charts, spending one week on the Disco singles chart at number 80 in Billboard magazine and "bubbling under" the Billboard Hot 100 for one week at number 108.

The film did not get much attention, either, and Preston described their next effort to give "With You I'm Born Again" more exposure, explaining that "after the film didn't do very well, the [soundtrack] album didn't sell well. We pulled it off that album and put it on mine." Preston's album, Late at Night, came out later in 1979, but even with that reissue of the song, Preston insisted that "we still didn't think of it as a single." It did, however, begin to get airplay in the European market and was finally released as a single at the end of the year.

Another hurdle the song had to overcome was that its title did not click with some record buyers. "Connors says her only regret about 'With You I'm Born Again' is that she didn't title it 'Come Bring Me Your Softness'. 'Berry Gordy called me to let me know we had a monster hit on our hands but that early on many people were going into record stores asking for "Come Bring Me Your Softness", and some record sales were lost as a result.'" The fact that the phrase "born again" is often associated with Christianity may have also been confusing, and Connors admitted, "Many thought the song had religious overtones, but Robert Culp and I were lovers at the time, and that's the way we felt about one another. Culp was the inspiration." The singers also felt the song could be interpreted in a religious context as well as being a romantic love song. Preston explained, "When we saw Fast Break, we understood it was a romantic song. But I think of it as religious because God is love, so it all inter-relates."

== Chart success ==
"With You I'm Born Again" debuted on the Billboard Hot 100 in the issue of the magazine dated December 8, 1979, and peaked at number four over the course of 29 weeks. The following week marked its first appearance on the UK singles chart and on Billboard's list of the 50 most popular adult contemporary songs in the U.S., and both chart runs resulted in a number two showing. It also started three weeks on the magazine's Hot Soul Singles chart in the January 19, 1980, issue and got as high as number 86. It was Preston's biggest hit in five years and the biggest pop hit of Wright's career.

== Charts ==
=== Weekly charts ===
Chart (1979–80)	Peak position
Australia (Kent Music Report)	21
Belgium (Ultratop)	17
Canada Adult Contemporary (RPM)	4
Canada Top Singles (RPM)	9
Ireland (IRMA)	7
Italy (Musica e dischi)	14
Netherlands (MegaCharts)	7
Sweden (Sverigetopplistan)	10
UK (Official Charts Company)	2
US Billboard Hot 100	4
US Adult Contemporary (Billboard)	2
US Hot Soul Singles (Billboard)	86

=== Year-end charts ===
Chart (1980)	Rank
Canada Top Singles (RPM)	72
Italy (FIMI)	69
US Adult Contemporary (Billboard)	10
US Hot 100 (Billboard)	21

== Certifications ==
Region	Certification	Certified units/sales
United Kingdom (BPI)	Silver	250,000^{^}
^{^} Shipments figures based on certification alone.

== Bibliography ==
- Leszczak, Bob (2016), Dynamic Duets: The Best Pop Collaborations from 1955 to 1999, Rowman & Littlefield, ISBN 9781442271494
- Whitburn, Joel (2004a), Joel Whitburn Presents Top R & B / Hip-Hop Singles, 1942-2004, Record Research Inc., ISBN 0898201608
- Whitburn, Joel (2004b), Joel Whitburn's Hot Dance / Disco, 1974-2003, Record Research Inc., ISBN 089820156X
- Whitburn, Joel (2007), Joel Whitburn Presents Billboard Top Adult Songs, 1961-2006, Record Research Inc., ISBN 978-0898201697
- Whitburn, Joel (2009), Joel Whitburn's Top Pop Singles, 1955-2008, Record Research Inc., ISBN 978-0898201802
