= Live at the Roxy (Eric Burdon album) =

Live album by Eric Burdon
- Released: 1998
- Recorded: 1975
- Genre: Hard rock
- Length: 52:59
- Label: One Way
- Producer: Bob Stone

Eric Burdon chronology
Eric Burdon Live (1996)	Live at the Roxy (1998)	The Official Live Bootleg No. 1 (2000)

Professional ratings
Review scores
Source	Rating
AllMusic	2/5 stars

Live at the Roxy (or Roxy Live) is an album by Eric Burdon recorded in May 1975. It features songs from the "Mirage project". It was released in 1998.

== Track listing ==
1. "First Sight" (5:33)
2. "Dragon Lady" (9:59)
3. "House of the Rising Sun" (9:45)
4. "Don't Let Me Be Misunderstood" (8:14)
5. "Freedom" (3:07)
6. "Jim Crow" (6:13)
7. "River of Blood" (9:54)
- The album was recorded in Los Angeles and re-released in 2008 entitled "Live in Hollywood". This album included one more song from this gig called "Ghetto Child", which was released before on the 1997 compilation Soldier of Fortune.
