= Slaughter (1972 film) =

1972 film by Jack Starrett

- Film poster
- Directed by: Jack Starrett
- Written by: Don Williams; Mark Hanna
- Produced by: Monroe Sachson
- Starring: Jim Brown; Stella Stevens; Rip Torn; Don Gordon; Marlene Clark; Cameron Mitchell
- Cinematography: Rosalio Solano
- Edited by: Clarence C. Reynolds; Renn Reynolds
- Music by: Luchi de Jesus
- Production companies: JayJen II Productions; Slaughter 1 Limited Partnership
- Distributed by: American International Pictures
- Release date: August 16, 1972
- Running time: 92 minutes
- Country: United States
- Budget: $750,000
- Box office: $10 million or $2.5 million

Slaughter is a 1972 blaxploitation film directed by Jack Starrett and starring Jim Brown as a former Green Beret captain seeking revenge for a murder. Stella Stevens, Rip Torn, Don Gordon and Cameron Mitchell co-star. This film was followed by a sequel the following year, Slaughter's Big Rip-Off (1973).

== Plot ==
After the father of Vietnam veteran and ex-Green Beret captain Slaughter is killed by a car bomb, he becomes obsessed with avenging the murder. He learns it was arranged by a Cleveland organized-crime gang and tracks down the mobster responsible, killing a Mafia member in the process. The murderer, however, manages to escape.

Slaughter gets arrested and charged with first-degree murder, but Treasury Department official Price offers to drop all charges if he agrees to go to an unnamed South American country to capture the escaped mobster, who apparently has a super-computer that helps him run his crime empire.

Upon arriving, Slaughter meets up with two fellow agents, Harry and Kim, having previously known Kim. The mobster responsible for the murder of Slaughter's father is Dominic Hoffo, right-hand man of kingpin Felice. Hoffo, a blatant racist and sociopath, instantly hates Slaughter, especially when his comare Ann, a professional working for the organization, makes it clear she's delighted to have been ordered by Felice to present herself to Slaughter as a peace offering.

Slaughter, having no intention of backing down from his vendetta, accepts Ann's offer with pleasure, and her loyalties quickly transfer to him. Numerous fights and gun battles ensue, with the hot-headed Hoffo eventually killing the more reasonable Felice and assuming command, beating Ann viciously for her disloyalty. After a climactic shootout and lengthy car chase, Slaughter succeeds in killing Hoffo by incinerating him in a crashed vehicle.

== Cast ==
- Jim Brown as Slaughter
- Stella Stevens as Ann Cooper
- Rip Torn as Dominic Hoffo
- Cameron Mitchell as A.W. Price
- Don Gordon as Harry Bastoli
- Marlene Clark as Kim Walker
- Robert Phillips as Frank Morelli
- Marion Brash as Jenny
- Norman Alfe as Mario Felice
- Eddie LoRusso as Al "Little Al"
- Buddy Garion as Eddie
- Roger Cudney as Gio
- Lance Winston as Intern
- Juan Jose Laboriel as Uncle
- Francisca Lopez de Laboriel as Aunt

== Filming ==
The film's working title was Kill Julian Blake. Brown made the film after a nine month break between movies, during which time he worked for his black economic union.

Slaughter was generally a low-budget production film, which was typical of most blaxploitation films during this era. It was directed by Jack Starrett. Writers included Don Williams and Mark Hanna. The producer was Monroe Sachson. Filming was in Mexico City, Distrito Federal, Mexico under the American International Pictures production company. Interiors were shot at the Churubusco Studios. Its U.S. release date was August 16, 1972 in New York City.

In a May 2, 1972 interview with The Hollywood Reporter, producer Monroe Sachson noted that the film's locale had to be changed from Mexico to a non-specified country at the request of the Mexican censorship board, even though the film had been partially financed by Estudios Churubusco. Sachson complained that the censorship board was "totally against any reference to their country if it shows it in any bad light." The article reported that Churubusco provided one third of the film's $850,000 budget, the rest of which came from Sachson's production company, JayJen II, AIP and Slaughter 1 Limited Partnership."

== Music ==
The music was principally done by Luchi De Jesus, as musical director/supervisor, for the original film. Manuel Topete was the sound designer. Ric Marlow also made contributions as a songwriter.

The theme song for Slaughter was written and performed by Billy Preston, who at the time was enjoying a commercial breakthrough as a solo artist with his soul-funk instrumental hit "Outa-Space". When released as a single in the US in 1972, "Slaughter" peaked at number 50 on the Billboard Hot 100 and number 17 on Billboard's R&B Singles chart. Preston's recording was later used by Quentin Tarantino in his 2009 film Inglourious Basterds. It also appears in Brian Helgeland's 2015 film Legend.

Despite the moderately successful theme song by Preston, a soundtrack for Slaughter was never released.

== Reception ==
Variety called it, "an exploitable violent programmer" which "has some slick values, and Jack Starrett’s direction is long on action but short on convincing drama. Stella Stevens, naked and clothed, adds to the scenery. The American International release will appeal to the rough trade."

Kevin Thomas of the Los Angeles Times dubbed it " an especially tacky and cynical exercise in mindless violence... a lame brained cliche."

In a synopsis for AllMovie, Mark Deming stated, "Featuring a dynamic theme song by Billy Preston, Slaughter was a major box-office hit in 1972 and one of the most popular films of Jim Brown's screen career; it spawned a sequel, Slaughter's Big Rip-Off, which appeared in 1973."

In retrospective reviews, Todd Doogan of The Digital Bits noted the film's "dated set-ups, stiff acting and horrifying dialogue", but felt that Brown had "a lot of charm and charisma, and he's always interesting to watch. This is a guy that has the right walk, the right stare and the right sexual bravura to carry anything off." Doogan ultimately concluded that Slaughter "will please even the hardest fan of exploitation films."

== Home video ==
Slaughter was released on DVD by MGM in the U.S. and Canada on January 9, 2001. It was released on Blu-ray on September 22, 2015 by Olive Films.

== See also ==
- List of American films of 1972
