= Outa-Space =

- French picture sleeve

Single by Billy Preston

from the album I Wrote a Simple Song
- A-side: "I Wrote a Simple Song"
- Released: December 20, 1971
- Length: 4:10
- Label: A&M
- Songwriters: Billy Preston, Joe Greene
- Producer: Billy Preston

Billy Preston singles chronology
"My Sweet Lord" (1970)	"Outa-Space" (1971)	"The Bus" (1972)

Official Audio
- "Outa-Space" on YouTube

"Outa-Space" is an instrumental recorded by Billy Preston that originally appeared on his 1971 A&M Records debut album, I Wrote a Simple Song. To create the primary instrumental sound, Preston played a clavinet through a wah wah pedal. The song was created by Preston improvising while calling out chord changes to the backing band. He later added organ and hand claps. Preston named the song "Outa-Space" for the instrumental's spacy sound.

While he thought it would be a hit, A&M was skeptical and issued it as the B-side of "I Wrote a Simple Song" in December 1971. However, radio DJs began flipping the single and, while "I Wrote a Simple Song" only reached number 77 on the Billboard Hot 100, "Outa-Space" peaked at number 2, showing that Preston's feelings about it were correct.

A version with vocals, entitled "All Spaced Out," was performed on an episode of The Midnight Special on August 31, 1973.

== Chart performance ==
"Outa-Space" was kept out of the top spot by "Lean on Me" by Bill Withers. The instrumental also topped the R&B Singles chart for a week, succeeding "Lean on Me". The single was certified Gold by the RIAA for sales of one million copies. In late 1972, "Outa-Space" peaked at number 44 on the UK Singles Chart.

"Outa-Space" won the Grammy for Best Pop Instrumental Performance of 1972.

== Personnel ==
- Billy Preston – piano, Hammond organ, keyboards
- David T. Walker – electric guitar
- George Harrison – guitar, Dobro
- Manuel Kellough – drums
- King Errisson – congas, percussion
- Tommy Vicari – engineer

== In pop culture ==
- In the 1990s, Intel Corporation used the song to promote their MMX-enabled Pentium processors.
