= Billy Preston =

American keyboardist, singer, and songwriter (1946–2006)

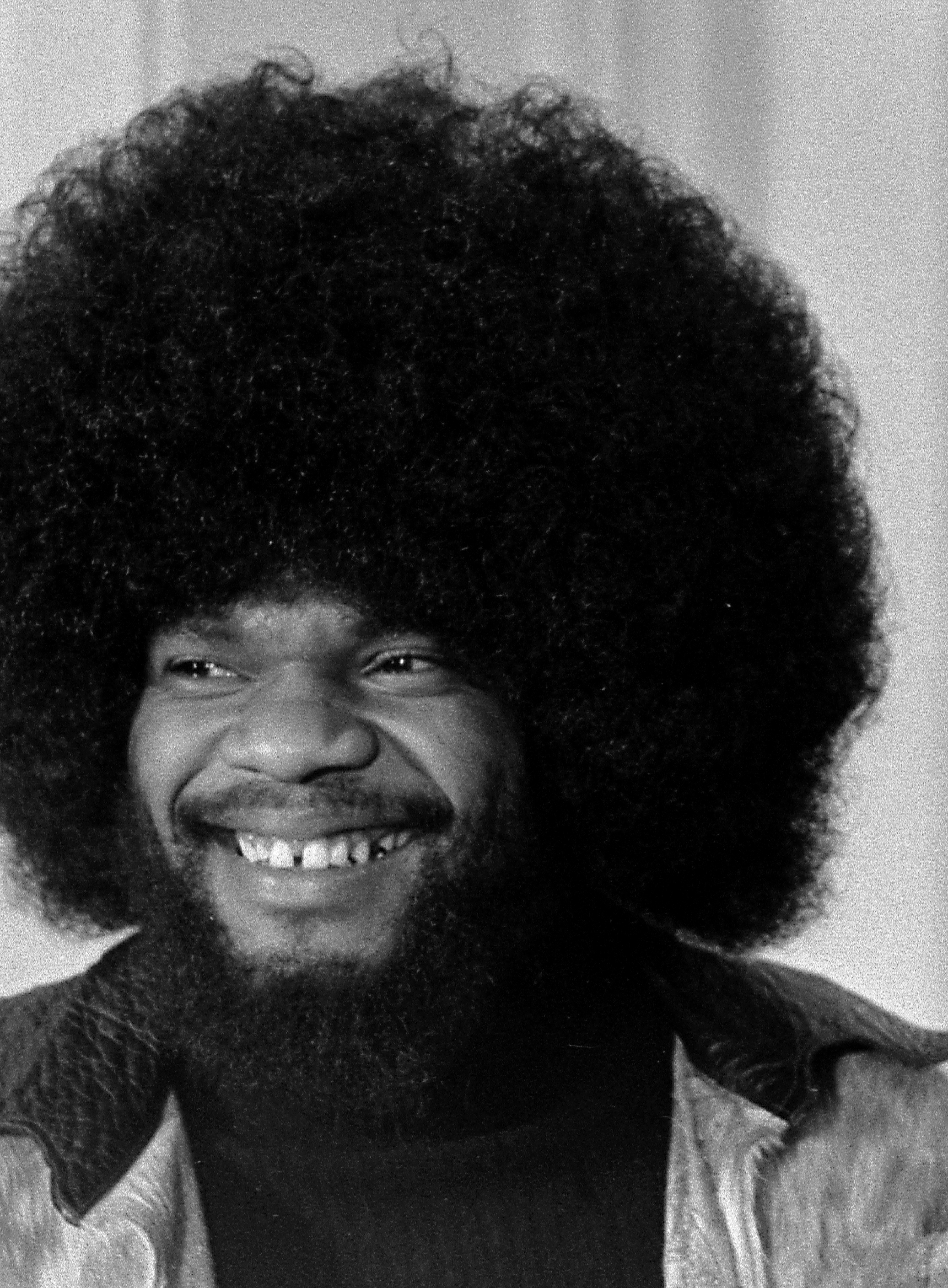
- Preston at the White House in 1974

Background information
- Born: William Everett Preston; September 2, 1946; Houston, Texas, U.S.
- Origin: Los Angeles, California, U.S.
- Died: June 6, 2006 (aged 59) Scottsdale, Arizona, U.S.
- Genres: R&B; soul; funk; rock; gospel
- Occupations: Musician; singer; songwriter
- Instruments: Vocals; keyboards
- Years active: 1956–2005
- Labels: Derby, Vee-Jay, Capitol, Apple, Buddah, A&M, Motown, Myrrh, King James, PepperCo, MCG
- Formerly of: Plastic Ono Band; Ringo Starr & His All-Starr Band
- Website: billypreston.net

William Everett Preston (September 2, 1946 – June 6, 2006) was an American keyboardist, singer, and songwriter whose work encompassed R&B, rock, soul, funk, and gospel. Preston was a top session keyboardist in the 1960s, backing Little Richard, Sam Cooke, Ray Charles, the Everly Brothers, Reverend James Cleveland, the Beatles, and the Rolling Stones. He gained attention as a solo artist with hit singles "That's the Way God Planned It", the Grammy-winning "Outa-Space", "Will It Go Round in Circles", "Space Race", "Nothing from Nothing", and "With You I'm Born Again". Additionally, Preston co-wrote "You Are So Beautiful", which became a hit for Joe Cocker.

Preston is one of very few musicians to be given a credit on a Beatles recording, which was done at the band's request; the group's 1969 single "Get Back" was credited as "The Beatles with Billy Preston". He is one of several people referred to as a fifth Beatle. Preston continued to record and perform with George Harrison after the Beatles' breakup, along with other artists such as Eric Clapton and the Rolling Stones on many of the group's albums and tours during the 1970s. He was inducted into the Rock and Roll Hall of Fame in 2021.

== Life and career ==
=== Early life ===
Preston was born September 2, 1946, in Houston but moved to Los Angeles as a child with his mother Robbie Lee Williams. A child prodigy, Preston was self taught, never having had a music lesson. By the age of ten, he was playing organ onstage backing gospel singers such as Mahalia Jackson. At 11, Preston appeared on Nat King Cole's NBC TV show singing the Fats Domino hit "Blueberry Hill" with Cole. He appeared in St. Louis Blues, the 1958 W. C. Handy biopic starring Cole; Preston played Handy at a younger age. In 1960, he became a pianist for Andraé Crouch with the Church of God in Christ Singers, which first recorded the smash gospel hit "The Blood Will Never Lose Its Power".

In 1962, Preston joined Little Richard's band as organist, and while performing in Hamburg he met the Beatles. In 1963, he played the organ on Sam Cooke's Night Beat album and released his debut album, 16 Yr. Old Soul, for Cooke's SAR label. In 1965, he released the album The Most Exciting Organ Ever and performed on the rock and roll show Shindig! In May or June 1965, he had a session with Little Richard and Jimi Hendrix in New York City, yielding the soul classic "I Don't Know What You've Got". In 1967, he joined Ray Charles' band. Following this exposure, several musicians began asking Preston to contribute to their sessions.

=== The Beatles ===
Preston is among those sometimes known as the "Fifth Beatle". After befriending the group in 1962, Preston joined the Get Back sessions in January 1969. At one point John Lennon proposed the idea of having Preston join the band; Paul McCartney countered it was difficult enough reaching agreements with four. Preston played organ and electric piano for the Beatles during several of the Get Back sessions; some of these sessions appeared in the film Let It Be and on its companion album. Footage of their collaboration appeared in the 2021 documentary The Beatles: Get Back directed by Peter Jackson. Preston accompanied the band on electric piano for its rooftop concert, the group's final public appearance. In April 1969, their single "Get Back" was credited to "The Beatles with Billy Preston", the only time an artist was credited as a co-performer with the Beatles after the band started recording as independent artists. (Note: A joint credit had been given on a Beatles record on the British release of the 1962 single "My Bonnie", where they backed Tony Sheridan.) The credit was bestowed by the Beatles to reflect the extent of Preston's presence on the track; his electric piano is prominent throughout and he plays an extended solo. Preston also worked, in a more limited role, on the 1969 Abbey Road album, contributing organ to the tracks "I Want You (She's So Heavy)" and "Something".

In 1978, he appeared as Sgt. Pepper in Robert Stigwood's film Sgt. Pepper's Lonely Hearts Club Band, which was based on the Beatles' album of the same name, and sang and danced to "Get Back" as the penultimate song.

=== Post-Beatles solo career ===
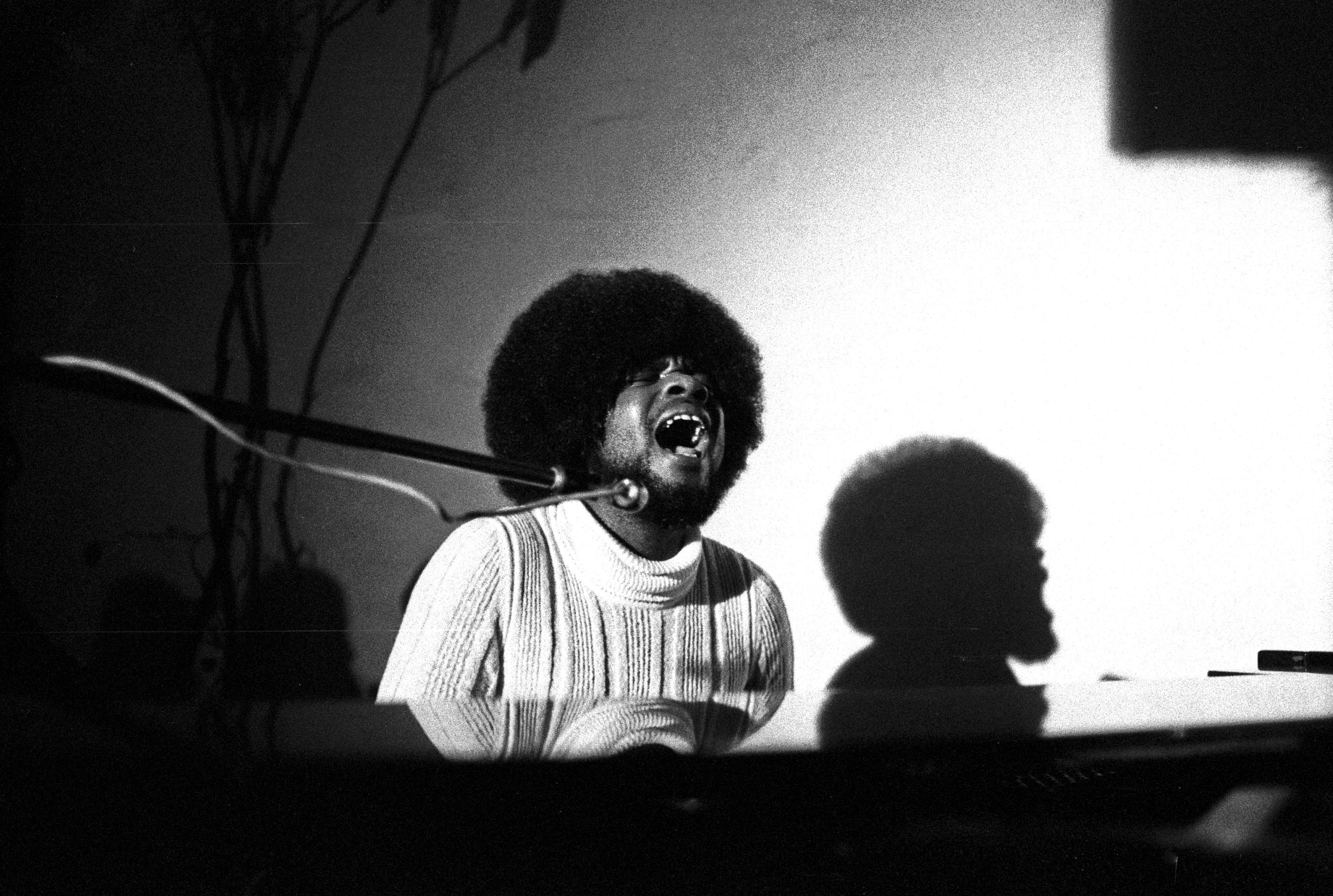
Preston singing at the piano in 1971

Signed to the Beatles' Apple label, in 1969, Preston released the album That's the Way God Planned It, produced by George Harrison, the title song from which was a hit single in Britain. His association with Harrison continued after the Beatles' breakup in 1970; Preston was the first artist to record Harrison's subsequent international hit "My Sweet Lord", on his 1970 album Encouraging Words, which Harrison co-produced with him. He appeared on several of Harrison's 1970s solo albums, starting with All Things Must Pass, and contributed to the Concert for Bangladesh, the Harrison-organized 1971 charity benefit. He also performed with the ex-Beatle on his 1974 tour of North America, and played at the 2002 Concert for George tribute held at Royal Albert Hall. Preston worked on solo releases by Lennon and Ringo Starr.

In 1971, Preston left Apple and signed with Herb Alpert's A&M Records. The previous year, he contributed to another hit single when Stephen Stills asked to use Preston's phrase "if you can't be with the one you love, Love the One You're With", a song on Stills's self-titled debut solo album.

Following the release of I Wrote a Simple Song on A&M, Preston's solo career peaked at this time, beginning with 1972's "Outa-Space", an instrumental track that further popularized the sound of the clavinet in funk music. The song reached number 2 on the US Billboard Hot 100 and topped Billboard's R&B chart, before going on to win the Grammy Award for Best Pop Instrumental Performance. "Outa-Space" sold over 1 million copies in America, and was awarded a gold disc by the RIAA in June 1972. Later that year, Preston contributed the title song to the hit blaxploitation film Slaughter starring Jim Brown.

Over the next two years, Preston followed up with the US chart-topping singles "Will It Go Round in Circles" (which displaced Harrison's "Give Me Love (Give Me Peace on Earth)" at the top on July 7, 1973) and "Nothing from Nothing", and the number 4 hit "Space Race". Each of the three singles sold in excess of one million copies. American Bandstand host and executive producer Dick Clark enjoyed "Space Race" so much that he used the instrumental for the mid-show break for virtually the remainder of its run.

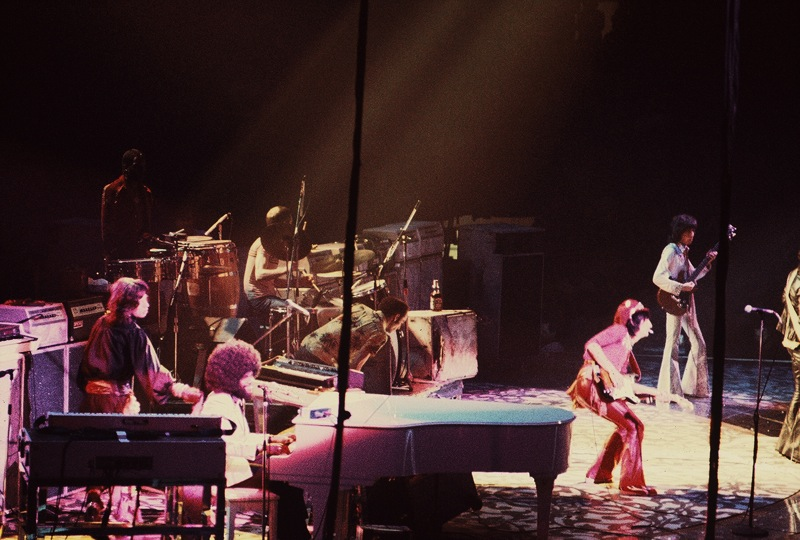
Preston (seated behind grand piano in foreground) performing with the Rolling Stones in 1975

From 1970, Preston played keyboards (including piano, organ, clavinet, and various synthesizers) for the Rolling Stones, sometimes alongside pianists Nicky Hopkins and Ian Stewart, on their albums Sticky Fingers, Exile on Main St., Goats Head Soup, It's Only Rock 'n Roll and Black and Blue. As the band's primary touring keyboardist from 1973 to 1977, he performed as a support act with his own band (including Mick Taylor on guitar) on their 1973 European tour. A Munich performance from this tour was documented on Preston's album Live European Tour 1973. In 1974, along with Bruce Fisher, one of his regular songwriting collaborators in the 1970s, he composed one of Joe Cocker's biggest hits, "You Are So Beautiful". On October 11, 1975, he was the first musical guest on Saturday Night Live's series premiere episode. Preston's 1973 song "Do You Love Me" was the basis for the Rolling Stones' track "Melody", released on Black and Blue in 1976. Although two of his songs were included in the band's 1975 and 1976 (plus the El Mocambo) live sets, the Stones and Preston parted company in 1977, mainly due to a disagreement over money. He continued to play on solo records by Stones members like Mick Jagger's Wandering Spirit, and made appearances on the band's Tattoo You and Bridges to Babylon.

After seven years with A&M, he signed with Motown. In 1979, he duetted with Syreeta Wright on the ballad "With You I'm Born Again", which reached number 4 on the charts in the US. Preston's career lost momentum in the 1980s, during which he became addicted to cocaine and alcohol. He left Motown in 1984 and focused on session work, contributing to works by artists such as Luther Vandross (his organ solos were included on Vandross's 1985 hit "Til My Baby Comes Home"), Whitney Houston and Patti LaBelle, among others. He served as musical director for Nightlife, a late-night talk show hosted by David Brenner that lasted one season from 1986 to 1987.

Preston toured with Eric Clapton, recorded with Gary Walker, one of the vocalists in his Los Angeles-based band, and worked with a wide range of other artists. He toured with Ringo Starr, appearing on his 1990 live album. He was invited to become a member of The Band in 1991, after the death of piano player Stan Szelest. He performed on tour with the group, but the sentencing from his cocaine and sexual assault charges in 1991 ended the collaboration.

=== Later work ===
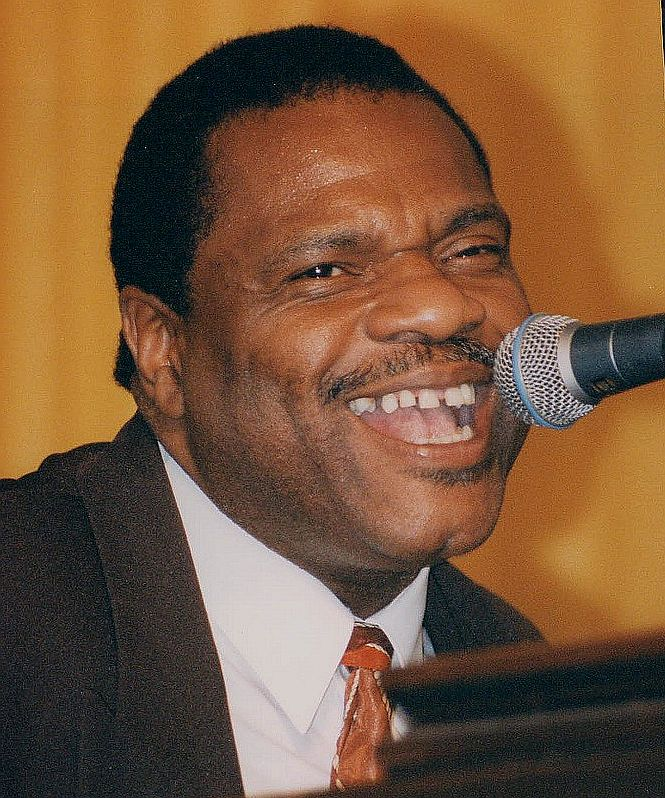
Preston in 1995

In 1997, Preston recorded the album You and I, in Italy, with Italian band Novecento. The album was produced by Vaughn De Spenza and Novecento members Lino and Pino Nicolosi. In 1998, Preston played organ during the choir numbers on the UPN comedy show Good News. The same year he sang and played synthesizer in the film Blues Brothers 2000, as part of the Louisiana Gator Boys supergroup.

On November 29, 2001, while touring and fighting his own health problems, Preston received the news that George Harrison had died, after a long illness. Preston, among many of Harrison's longtime friends, performed in the 2002 Concert for George at the Royal Albert Hall in London. Preston's performance of "My Sweet Lord" received critical acclaim. Additionally, he sang "Isn't It a Pity", provided backing vocals on most of the other songs, and played the Hammond organ for the show.

In 2002, Preston appeared on the Johnny Cash album American IV: The Man Comes Around, playing piano on "Personal Jesus" and "Tear-Stained Letter".

In 2004, Preston toured with the Funk Brothers and Steve Winwood in Europe, and then with Clapton in Europe and North America. After the Clapton tours, he went to France, where he was featured in one episode of the Legends Rock TV show. His performance included a duet with Sam Moore on "You Are So Beautiful"; this was Preston's last filmed concert.

In 2004, Preston performed as a jazz organist on Ray Charles's Genius Loves Company, an album of duets, on the song "Here We Go Again" with Charles and Norah Jones.

In March 2005, he appeared on the American Idol fourth-season finale. Playing piano, he performed "With You I'm Born Again" with Vonzell Solomon (who finished the contest in third place). The same year, he recorded "Go Where No One's Gone Before", the main title song for the anime series L/R: Licensed by Royalty.

Preston played clavinet on the song "Warlocks" for the Red Hot Chili Peppers album Stadium Arcadium (2006). Although very ill by this point, he jumped out of his bed after hearing a tape of the song given to him by the band, recorded his part, and went back to bed. Preston's final recorded contributions were the gospel-tinged organ on the Neil Diamond album 12 Songs (2005), and his keyboard work on The Road to Escondido (2006) by Eric Clapton and J. J. Cale.

In late 2005, Preston made his last public performance, in Los Angeles, to publicize the re-release of the 1972 documentary film The Concert for Bangladesh. He played a set of three Harrison songs—"Give Me Love", "My Sweet Lord" and "Isn't It a Pity"—with Dhani Harrison and Starr joining on guitar and drums, respectively, for the last song.

== Personal life ==
=== Childhood abuse ===
In an interview for a 2010 BBC Radio 4 documentary on his life and career, Preston's manager Joyce Moore revealed that after she began handling his affairs, Preston opened up to her about the lifelong trauma he had suffered as the result of being sexually abused as a child. Preston told Moore that at about the age of nine, after he and his mother moved to Los Angeles from Houston to perform in a touring production of Amos 'n' Andy, he was repeatedly abused by the touring company's pianist. When Preston told his mother about the abuse, she did not believe him, and failed to protect him. The abuse went on for the entire summer, and Preston was also later abused by a local pastor.

=== Religion ===
Preston was brought up in the African-American gospel tradition; he was a committed Christian throughout his life and openly expressed his faith in works such as his 1970s hit "That's the Way God Planned It". His personal beliefs were sometimes at odds with the attitudes and musical expressions of the secular world of rock & roll in which he often worked, but he was apparently willing to put his religious views aside when working on tracks like John Lennon's openly atheistic song "God". Preston was deeply attached to his mother, for whom he wrote the song that became his best-known composition, "You Are So Beautiful".

=== Relationship ===
A traumatic incident, which reportedly affected Preston deeply, occurred in the early 1970s, while he was engaged to actress and model Kathy Silva. At this time Preston had become close friends with musician Sly Stone, and made many contributions to Stone's recordings of the period (including the album There's a Riot Goin' On). According to Moore, Preston was devastated when he came home one day to find Stone in bed with Silva (who later married Stone on stage at Madison Square Garden). According to Moore, Silva's affair with Stone was the trigger that led Preston to stop having relationships with women. It was after this incident that he began using cocaine and having sex with men, and Moore has stated that she saw his drug abuse as his way of coping with the internal conflicts he felt about his "sexual urges".

=== Sexual orientation ===
Although the details did not become fully known to the general public until after his death, Preston struggled throughout his life to cope with his homosexuality, and deal with the lasting effects of the traumatic sexual abuse he suffered as a boy. Although his sexual orientation became known to friends and associates in the music world (such as Keith Richards), Preston did not publicly come out as gay until just before he died, partly because he felt that it conflicted with his deeply held religious beliefs and his lifelong association with the church. In his autobiography, Life (2010), Keith Richards mentioned Preston's struggles with his homosexuality.

=== Legal issues and drug addiction ===
Preston checked into a drug rehabilitation program to treat his addictions in 1991.

While on probation for a drunk driving conviction in August 1991, Preston was arrested for sexually assaulting a 16-year-old Mexican boy after picking him up at a gathering point for day laborers. The boy told authorities that Preston took him to his Malibu home, smoked cocaine, showed him pornographic pictures and tried to assault him before he escaped. Preston was also charged with assault with a deadly weapon involving a man he picked up to do work at his home, the day before his arrest in the case involving the boy. After submitting to a drug test, Preston tested positive for cocaine. He entered no-contest pleas to the cocaine and assault charges. The sex charges which included misdemeanor charges of child molestation and exhibiting pornographic material to a minor were dismissed. He was sentenced to nine months at a drug rehabilitation center and three months of house arrest.

Preston was sentenced to 30 days in jail for violating his probation on a drunk driving conviction in 1992.

Preston was sentenced to three years in a California prison for cocaine possession in violation of his probation in 1997. He had been placed on three years' probation earlier that year after testing positive for cocaine use; under the terms, he agreed to spend 90 days in jail and to remain drug-free.

While in prison in 1998, Preston was indicted for a $1 million insurance fraud scheme after setting fire to his own house in Los Angeles. He pleaded guilty and agreed to testify against other defendants involved in the scam. His plea called for five years of probation, one year in jail and $60,000 in restitution. The probation and jail time ran concurrent with his cocaine possession conviction. At California's Avenal State Prison, Preston led a chorus and performed at church services. He served 18 months of his four-year sentence, after which he apparently became drug-free.

== Death ==
Preston had suffered kidney disease in his later years, brought on by his hypertension. He received a kidney transplant in 2002, but his health continued to deteriorate. He had voluntarily entered a drug rehabilitation clinic in Malibu, California, and suffered pericarditis there, leading to respiratory failure that left him in a coma from November 21, 2005, until he died on June 6, 2006, in Scottsdale, Arizona.

Preston's funeral was held on June 21, 2006. At the funeral, which lasted almost three hours, Joe Cocker sang, Little Richard spoke, and a brass band played a version of "Amazing Grace". Other musical performers included the Temptations' lead vocalist Ali Woodson and singer Merry Clayton. A gospel choir sang throughout. The mourners also heard letters written by Paul McCartney, the Rolling Stones, Eric Clapton, and others who had toured and recorded with Preston. He was buried at Inglewood Park Cemetery in Inglewood, California.

== Legacy ==
Miles Davis' 1974 album Get Up with It has a track called "Billy Preston" in his honor.

Ringo Starr, speaking during the rehearsals for the Concert for George in 2002, called Preston one of the greatest Hammond organ players of all time. In another interview Starr said, "Billy never put his hands in the wrong place. Never."

In his introduction to the 2010 BBC Radio program Billy Preston: That's the Way God Planned It, former Yes keyboardist Rick Wakeman said of Preston: "Every keyboard player I know loves Billy Preston. You can spot his playing a mile off, whether it's the Hammond organ, the Fender Rhodes or the piano. He had such a spiritual touch to his technique; it made him completely unique."

In 2021, White Horse Pictures and Homegrown Pictures announced that they were making a documentary on Preston, to be directed by Paris Barclay. The film, titled Billy Preston: That's the Way God Planned It, released in select North American markets in 2026.

Jon Batiste plays Preston in the 2024 film Saturday Night.

In 2024, Neil McCormick of The Daily Telegraph ranked Preston as the fourth greatest keyboard player of all time, calling him "the ultimate RnB keyboard player".

== Awards and nominations ==
Preston was nominated for nine Grammy Awards and won two. He won a Grammy Award for Best Pop Instrumental Performance for "Outa-Space" at the 15th Annual Grammy Awards in 1973. He also won a Grammy Award for Album of the Year for his participation in the album The Concert For Bangla Desh at the same ceremony. He was inducted into the Class of 2021 of the Rock and Roll Hall of Fame with the Musical Excellence Award.

== Discography ==
With The Beatles

- Abbey Road (1969)
- Let It Be (1970)

With The Rolling Stones

- Sticky Fingers (1971)
- Exile on Main St. (1972)
- Goats Head Soup (1973)
- It's Only Rock 'n Roll (1974)
- Black and Blue (1976)
- Love You Live (1977)

Solo

- 16 Yr. Old Soul (1963)
- The Most Exciting Organ Ever (1965)
- Early Hits of 1965 (1965)
- Wildest Organ in Town! (1966)
- That's the Way God Planned It (1969)
- Encouraging Words (1970)
- I Wrote a Simple Song (1971)
- Music Is My Life (1972)
- Everybody Likes Some Kind of Music (1973)
- The Kids & Me (1974)
- It's My Pleasure (1975)
- Billy Preston (1976)
- A Whole New Thing (1977)
- Behold! (1978)
- Late at Night (1979)
- Universal Love (1980)
- The Way I Am (1981)
- Billy Preston & Syreeta (1981)
- Pressin' On (1982)
- On the Air (1984)
- Ministry of Music (1985)
- You Can't Keep a Good Man Down (1986)
- Billy's Back! (1995)
- Minister of Music (1995)
- You and I (1997)
- Music from My Heart (2001)
