= Joe Greene (American singer) =

American singer

- Born: Joseph Arthur Greene
- Occupations: Gospel singer, songwriter

Joe Greene is an American gospel and soul singer and songwriter. A male soprano, he was especially active in the late 1960s and the 1970s as a backing vocalist for rock artists seeking to achieve a more polished vocal performance on their recordings. As a songwriter during that time, he frequently collaborated with Billy Preston, co-writing the latter's Grammy-winning 1972 hit "Outa-Space" and other songs.

Among the many artists whose recordings Greene appeared on are Quincy Jones, the Rolling Stones, Neil Diamond, Ringo Starr and Harry Nilsson. According to AllMusic, together with singers such as Vanetta Field and Clydie King, Greene was "on the 'A' list" of studio backing vocalists in the U.S. He was also one of the singers in "The Soul Choir" that accompanied George Harrison, Starr, Preston and Leon Russell at the Concert for Bangladesh in August 1971.

Greene co-wrote the song "Let the Music Play" on Preston's 1970 album for Apple Records, Encouraging Words. In June 1971, he signed a songwriting deal with Preston's publishing company, WEP Music, whereby he would receive 35 per cent of the company's net profits. Two years later, Greene sued Preston and WEP for $500,000, claiming he had been paid nothing for hits such as "Outa-Space". He continued to work with Preston, including co-writing the title track to the artist's 1979 album Late at Night and singing on the album.

In the ensuing decades, Greene withdrew from rock music and focused on gospel and choral projects.
