= Bruce Fisher =

American songwriter

Bruce Fisher (born January 8, 1954) is an American songwriter, record producer, and playwright best known for his collaborations with Billy Preston. Fisher's best-known songs include "You Are So Beautiful", "Will It Go Round In Circles", and "Nothing from Nothing", all co-written with Preston before 1973.

== Career ==
Born in Washington D.C., Fisher was raised in Chicago, Illinois, by his grandmother. He moved to Los Angeles, California, in the early 1970s, where he currently resides.

Fisher's best-known songs include "You Are So Beautiful", "Will It Go Round In Circles", and "Nothing from Nothing", all co-written with Preston before 1973. With his first LP release, Red Hot in 1977, he worked with Roy Ayers, Keni Burke (with whom he wrote the title song), Charles Earland, Mtume and the Brecker Brothers in 1977. He also played and performed with The Blackbyrds, James Gadson, David Williams, Leon Ware, Carolyn Willis, Wah Wah Watson, Ernie Watts, the late Richard Tee and Bernard Purdie throughout the 1970s and 1980s. He also co-wrote and produced songs for the group 3 for 3 in 1990.

He also wrote and performed the title track to Quincy Jones' first gold album, Body Heat.

== Recent activity ==
In recent years, as a managing member at Speak of the Devil LLC, Theatre Production, Fisher has been producing a play that he wrote entitled "Hear No Evil", starring Tony Award nominee Keith David, directed by Tony nominee Obba Babatunde, with musical direction by Harold Wheeler and costume design by Academy Award winner Ruth E. Carter.

Fisher has also seen the release of several songs on Leigh Jones' debut album, Music In My Soul.

== Partial discography ==
=== Singles ===
- "At The End Of A Love Affair" (United Artists 1976)
- "In My Life" b/w "Starlight Starbright" (Mercury Records 1977)
- "Red Hot" b/w "Money's Funny" (Mercury Records 1977)

=== Albums ===
- Red Hot (Mercury Records 1977)
- Wet Dream (Kryptics 1996)

== As writer or co-writer ==
| Artist | Title | Album if applicable | Release | Date | Role | Notes # |
|---|---|---|---|---|---|---|
| Doug Gibbs | "I'll Always Have You There"; Cloudy Day | | Oak OR-108 | 1972 | Co-writer | 45 rpm single |
| Billy Preston | "Will It Go Round In Circles" | Music Is My Life | A&M Records | 1972 | Co-writer | |
| Quincy Jones | "Body Heat" | Body Heat | Mercury Records | 1973 | Co-writer | |
| Leigh Jones | (selected tracks) | Music In My Soul | Peak Records | 2008 | Co-writer | |
