= Patti Austin discography =

This is the discography for American singer Patti Austin.

== Studio albums ==
Year	Album	Chart positions						Record label
Year	Album	US	US R&B	US Jazz	US Co. Jazz	US Tra. Jazz	UK	Record label
1976	End of a Rainbow	—	—	31	—	—	—	CTI
1977	Havana Candy	116	—	—	—	—	—	CTI
1980	Body Language	—	62	28	—	—	—	CTI
1981	Every Home Should Have One	36	16	9	—	—	99	Qwest
1984	Patti Austin	87	25	—	—	—	—	Qwest
1985	Gettin' Away with Murder	182	25	—	—	39	—	Qwest
1988	The Real Me	—	56	—	7	—	—	Qwest
1990	Love Is Gonna Getcha	93	45	—	4	—	—	GRP
1991	Carry On	—	75	—	13	—	—	GRP
1994	That Secret Place	—	—	15	12	—	—	GRP
1996	Jukebox Dreams (Japan only)	—	—	—	—	—	—	Pony Canyon
1998	In & Out of Love	—	—	—	—	—	—	Concord
1999	Street of Dreams	—	—	—	—	—	—	Intersound / Platinum
2001	On the Way to Love	—	—	36	21	—	—	Warner Bros.
2002	For Ella	—	—	18	—	7	—	Playboy Jazz / Concord
2003	"Papillon" featuring Patti Austin and Frances Yip	—	—	—	—	—	—	Independence Label
2007	Avant Gershwin	—	—	8	—	5	—	Rendezvous
2011	Sound Advice	—	—	15	8	—	—	Shanachie
2016	Mighty Musical Fairy Tales	—	—	—	—	—	—	Let's Roar
2023	For Ella 2	—	—	—	—	—	—	One River Stream
"—" denotes the album failed to chart and/or was not released in that territory

== Live albums ==
Year	Album	Chart positions				Record label
Year	Album	US	US R&B	US Jazz	US Co. Jazz	Record label
1979	Live at the Bottom Line	—	—	33	—	CTI
1992	Live	—	—	—	20	GRP
2017	Ella and Louis	—	—	—	—	ABC Jazz
"—" denotes the album failed to chart and/or was not released in that territory

== Singles ==
Year	Single	Peak positions					Album
Year	Single	US R&B	US Hot 100	US A.C	US Dance	UK	Album
1965	"I Wanna Be Loved" / "A Most Unusual Boy"	—	—	—	—	—	(Coral 45 #62471)
1966	"Take Away the Pain Stain"	—	—	—	—	—	(Coral 45 #62491)
1969	"The Family Tree"	46	—	—	—	—	(United Artists 45 #50520)
1971	"Black California"	—	—	—	—	—	(Columbia 45 #45410)
1972	"Day by Day"	—	—	—	—	—	(Columbia 45 #45592)
1977	"Say You Love Me"	63	—	—	—	—	End of a Rainbow
1978	"Love, I Never Had It So Good"	60	—	—	—	—	Sounds...and Stuff Like That!!
1978	"We're in Love"	90	—	—	—	—	Havana Candy
1980	"Body Language"	45	—	—	—	—	Body Language
1981	"Do You Love Me?" / "The Genie"	24	—	—	1	76	Every Home Should Have One
1981	"Razzamatazz" (with Quincy Jones)	17	—	—	—	11	The Dude
1981	"Betcha Wouldn't Hurt Me" (with Quincy Jones)	—	—	—	—	52	The Dude
1981	"Every Home Should Have One"	55	62	24	—	—	Every Home Should Have One
1982	"Baby, Come to Me" (with James Ingram)	9	1	1	—	11	Every Home Should Have One
1983	"How Do You Keep the Music Playing?" (with James Ingram)	6	45	5	—	—	It's Your Night
1983	"In My Life"	92	—	—	—	—	In My Life
1984	"It's Gonna Be Special"	15	82	—	5	—	Patti Austin; Two of a Kind original soundtrack
1984	"Rhythm of the Street"	33	—	—	11	96	Patti Austin
1984	"Shoot the Moon"	49	—	—	16	—	Patti Austin
1985	"Honey for the Bees"	24	—	—	6	—	Gettin' Away with Murder
1985	"Gettin' Away with Murder"	72	—	—	—	—	Gettin' Away with Murder
1985	"Gimme, Gimme, Gimme" (with Narada Michael Walden)	39	106	—	—	87	The Nature of Things
1986	"The Heat of Heat"	13	55	—	14	76	Gettin' Away with Murder
1989	"The Girl Who Used to Be Me"	—	—	—	—	—	Love Is Gonna Getcha
1989	"Any Other Fool" (with Sadao Watanabe)	—	—	6	—	—	Front Seat
1990	"Through the Test of Time"	60	—	9	—	—	Love Is Gonna Getcha
1991	"Givin' Into Love"	55	—	—	—	—	Carry On
1992	"I'll Keep Your Dreams Alive" (with George Benson)	—	—	—	—	68	Darlings Delight
1994	"Reach"	—	—	—	4	—	That Secret Place
"—" denotes the single failed to chart and/or was not released in that format
