= Front Seat (album) =

Studio album by Sadao Watanabe
- Released: June 25, 1989
- Recorded: April — May 1989
- Studios: Bill Schnee Studio (North Hollywood); Entourage Studios (North Hollywood); The Hop (Sherman Oaks); Le Gonks (West Hollywood); Westlake Studio (West Hollywood)
- Genre: Jazz
- Length: 45:29
- Label: Elektra
- Producers: Robbie Buchanan; George Duke; Russell Ferrante

Sadao Watanabe chronology
Made in Coracao Toquinho (1988)	Front Seat (1989)	Sweet Deal (1991)

Front Seat is a 1989 jazz album by the Japanese saxophonist Sadao Watanabe. The album features vocals by Patti Austin on two tracks, one of which, "Any Other Fool", reached number 6 during its 31 weeks on Billboard magazine's Adult Contemporary chart.

== Release and commercial performance ==
Front Seat was released on June 25, 1989. It spent 21 weeks on Billboard magazine's Top Contemporary Jazz Albums chart, where it reached number 8 in the issue dated March 3, 1990.

== Critical reception ==
The editors of Billboard magazine selected "Only in My Mind", "Any Other Fool", "Front Seat", "Anga la Jua" and "Wild Flowers" as the album's "standout tracks".

== Track listing ==
All songs written by Sadao Watanabe, except as noted.

1. "Sailing" - 5:55
2. "One More Time" - 4:59
3. "Only in My Mind" (with Patti Austin) (Watanabe, Jeff Pescetto) - 4:44
4. "Miles Apart" - 4:10
5. "Any Other Fool" (with Patti Austin) (Robbie Buchanan, Diane Warren) - 5:06
6. "On the Way" - 5:18
7. "Anga la Jua (Place in the Sun)" - 4:22
8. "Wild Flowers" - 3:22
9. "Front Seat" - 2:56
10. "Takin' Time" - 4:37

== Personnel ==
- Sadao Watanabe – alto saxophone (1, 2, 4–10), sopranino saxophone (3)
- George Duke – arranger (1, 2), Yamaha TX816 (1, 2), Roland D-550 (1, 2), Synclavier (1, 2)
- Robbie Buchanan – arranger (3, 4, 5, 6, 10), keyboards (3, 4, 5, 6, 10), synthesizers (3, 4, 5, 6, 10)
- Russell Ferrante – arranger (7, 8, 9), keyboards (7, 8, 9)
- Oscar Castro-Neves – acoustic guitar (9)
- Paul Jackson Jr. – guitar (1–6, 10)
- Jimmy Haslip – bass (7)
- Abraham Laboriel – bass (1, 2, 6)
- Neil Stubenhaus – bass (3, 4, 5, 10)
- Alex Acuña – drums (7, 9), percussion (3–7, 9, 10)
- Paulinho da Costa – percussion (1, 2)
- Jeff Porcaro – drums (3, 4, 5, 10)
- John Robinson – drums (6)
- Efrain Toro – percussion (7, 9)
- Carlos Vega – drums (1, 2)
- Patti Austin – lead vocals (3, 5), backing vocals (3, 5)
- Alex Brown – backing vocals (1)
- Carl Carwell – backing vocals (1)
- Syreeta Wright – backing vocals (1)

== Production ==
- Sadao Watanabe – executive producer
- Robbie Buchanan – producer (3, 4, 5, 6, 10)
- George Duke – producer (1, 2)
- Russell Ferrante – producer (7, 8, 9)
- Erik Zobler – recording (1, 2), mixing (1, 2)
- Kevin Fisher – assistant engineer (1, 2)
- Debbie Johnson – assistant engineer (1, 2)
- Steve Holroyd – assistant engineer (1, 2)
- Dave Ridean – additional engineer (1, 2)
- Stephanie McCravey – production coordinator (1, 2)
- Jeff Balding – recording (3, 4, 5, 10), mixing (3, 4, 5, 6, 10)
- Ken Allandyce – assistant engineer (3, 4, 5, 10)
- Derrick Marcel – assistant engineer (3, 4, 5, 6, 10)
- Frank Wolf – recording (6)
- Wade Jaynce – assistant engineer (6)
- Bart Stevens – assistant engineer (6)
- David Hentschel – recording (7, 8, 9)
- Keith Blake – assistant engineer (7, 8, 9)
- Duane Seykora – assistant engineer (7, 8, 9)
- Marylata Elton – production coordinator (7, 8, 9)
- Miki Cannon – production coordinator
- Kyle Davis – production coordinator
- Hiroshi Makishima – production coordinator
- Riki Ninomiya – production coordinator
- Akihiko Sato – production coordinator
- Akio Ohno – photography
- Yoshihiko Matsubara – artwork design

== Charts ==
Chart performance for Front Seat
Chart (1990)	Peak position
Billboard Contemporary Jazz Albums	8

== Bibliography ==
- Whitburn, Joel (2007), Joel Whitburn Presents Billboard Top Adult Songs, 1961-2006, Record Research Inc., ISBN 978-0898201697
