= Any Other Fool =

Single by Sadao Watanabe

from the album Front Seat
- Released: 1989
- Recorded: 1989
- Studio: Bill Schnee Studio (North Hollywood); The Hop (Sherman Oaks)
- Genre: Pop
- Length: 4:20 (single version); 5:06 (album version)
- Label: Elektra
- Songwriters: Robbie Buchanan; Diane Warren
- Producer: Robbie Buchanan

Patti Austin singles chronology
"The Girl Who Used to Be Me" (1989)	"Any Other Fool" (1989)	"Through the Test of Time" (1990)

Music video
- "Any Other Fool" on YouTube

"Any Other Fool" is a song written by Robbie Buchanan and Diane Warren. It was recorded by Sadao Watanabe featuring Patti Austin on vocal and released as the first single from his 1989 album Front Seat.

== Commercial performance ==
"Any Other Fool" reached number 6 on Billboard magazine's Adult Contemporary chart during its 31 weeks there.

== Critical reception ==
The editors of Billboard magazine selected "Any Other Fool" as one of the "standout tracks" from Front Seat. The editors of SoulTracks described it as a "fantastic Lost Gem that sounds as good now as it did more than three decades ago."

== Music video ==
"Any Other Fool" was listed on VH1's reports to Billboard indicating what videos were in rotation on the cable network, making its first appearance there in the January 6, 1990, issue.

== Personnel ==
From the liner notes for Front Seat:

- Sadao Watanabe – Alto saxophone
- Patti Austin – lead vocals, backing vocals
- Robbie Buchanan – arranger, keyboards, synthesizers
- Paul Jackson Jr. – guitar
- Neil Stubenhaus – bass
- Alex Acuña – percussion
- Jeff Porcaro – drums

== Production ==
From the liner notes for Front Seat:

- Sadao Watanabe – executive producer
- Robbie Buchanan – producer
- Jeff Balding – recording, mixing
- Ken Allandyce – assistant engineer
- Derrick Marcel – assistant engineer
- Miki Cannon – production coordinator
- Kyle Davis – production coordinator
- Hiroshi Makishima – production coordinator
- Riki Ninomiya – production coordinator
- Akihiko Sato – production coordinator
- Recorded and overdubbed at Bill Schnee Studio, North Hollywood, CA, and The Hop, Sherman Oaks, CA. Mixed at Studio 55, Hollywood, CA.

== Charts ==
Weekly chart performance for "Any Other Fool"
Chart (1990)	Peak position
US Billboard Adult Contemporary	6

== Bibliography ==
- Whitburn, Joel (2007), Joel Whitburn Presents Billboard Top Adult Songs, 1961-2006, Record Research Inc., ISBN 978-0898201697
