= Set My Love in Motion =

Studio album by Syreeta Wright
- Released: October 21, 1981
- Recorded: 1980–1981
- Length: 42:40
- Label: Tamla
- Producer: Hal Davis, Ollie Brown, Angelo Bond, William Weatherspoon

Syreeta Wright chronology
Syreeta (1980)	Set My Love in Motion (1981)	Billy Preston & Syreeta (1981)

Professional ratings
Review scores
Source	Rating
AllMusic	3.5/5 stars

Set My Love In Motion is the fifth studio album by American singer and songwriter Syreeta Wright, released on October 21, 1981, by Motown.

The album yielded three singles: "You Set My Love in Motion", "Can't Shake Your Love" and "Quick Slick". Set My Love in Motion did not achieve much commercial success, reaching the lower half of the Billboard 200 album chart, where it peaked at No. 189, although fared better on the Black Albums chart, where it reached the top forty.

== Track listing ==
Side one

1. "Quick Slick" (Norma Helms, Hal Davis, Mitchell Bottler) – 5:24
2. "Move It, Do It" (Angelo Bond, Todd Cochrane, William Weatherspoon) – 3:54
3. "You Set My Love in Motion" (Maureen Bailey, David Richard Cohen) – 3:29
4. "There's Nothing Like a Woman in Love" (Brian Short, Gloria Sklerov) – 4:22
5. "Can't Shake Your Love" (Norma Helms, Hal Davis, Mitchell Bottler) – 4:12

Side two

6. "I Must Be in Love" (Kenneth Hirsch, Mark Mueller) – 3:52
7. "Wish Upon a Star" (Syreeta Wright) – 3:45
8. "Out the Box" (Ollie E. Brown, Paul M. Jackson, Jr., Syreeta Wright) – 5:44
9. "I Know The Way To Your Heart" (Joe Blocker, Marlo Henderson) – 4:07
10. "I Love You" (Paul Hines, James S. Stewart, Jr., Syreeta Wright) – 4:21

== Personnel ==
- Syreeta – vocals
- Barry Finnerty, Carlos Rios, David T. Walker, Robert Palmer – guitar
- Paul Jackson Jr. – synthesizer, guitar
- Todd Cochran – keyboards, synthesizer
- Nathan Watts, Romeo Williams – bass guitar
- Clarence McDonald, John Barnes, Sylvester Rivers – keyboards
- Michael Boddicker – synthesizer
- Marlo Henderson – guitar, sitar
- Wayne Stalling, William Bryant Jr. – clavinet, piano, synthesizer
- Eddie "Klunis" Summers, James Gadson, Kenneth Elliott, Ollie E. Brown – drums
- Melvin "Melmel" Webb, Ollie E. Brown, Paulinho da Costa – percussion
- Gary Herbig, Gerald Albright – saxophone
- Andrea Robinson, Jeanette Hawes, Jim Gilstrap, Lynn Davis, Marti McCall, Patti Brooks, Suzanne Coston – backing vocals
- Jerry Hey – horn arrangements
- Gene Page – string arrangements

== Chart performance ==
Chart (1983)	Peak position
US Billboard 200	189
US Top R&B/Hip-Hop Albums (Billboard)	40
