= Emotionally Yours =

Studio album by the O'Jays
- Released: January 21, 1991
- Studios: Right Track, Cleveland, Ohio; Sigma Sound, Philadelphia; Hip Pocket, New York City; Marathon, New York City; Power Station, New York City; Tarpan, San Rafael, California; Ocean Way, Hollywood, California; Madhatter, Los Angeles; Mad Fly, New York City; Hit Factory, New York City
- Genre: R&B
- Label: EMI
- Producers: Dunn Pearson; Dwain Mitchell; Lotti Golden; Narada Michael Walden; Ron Fair; Terry Stubbs; The O'Jays; Tommy Faragher

The O'Jays chronology
Serious (1989)	Emotionally Yours (1991)	Home for Christmas (1991)

Singles from Emotionally Yours
- 1. "Don't Let Me Down" Released: February 7, 1991; 2. "Emotionally Yours" Released: March 28, 1991; 3. "Keep on Loving Me" Released: July 23, 1991

Professional ratings
Review scores
Source	Rating
AllMusic	3/5 stars
Entertainment Weekly	B−

Emotionally Yours is the 21st studio album by American R&B trio the O'Jays. It was released on January 21, 1991, through EMI Records, making it the group's second album for the label. Recording sessions took place at Right Track in Cleveland, at Sigma Sound in Philadelphia, at Hip Pocket Studio, Marathon Studios, Power Station, Mad Fly Studios and The Hit Factory in New York, at Tarpan Studios in San Rafael, and at Ocean Way Studios and Madhatter Studios in Los Angeles. Production was handled by Dwain Mitchell, Terry Stubbs, Lotti Golden, Tommy Faragher, Narada Michael Walden, Dunn Pearson, The O'Jays, and Ron Fair, who also served as executive producer.

The album peaked at number 73 on the Billboard 200 and number 2 on the Top R&B Albums chart in the United States. It was certified Gold by the Recording Industry Association of America on August 29, 1991, for selling 500,000 units in the US. It spawned three singles: "Don't Let Me Down", "Emotionally Yours" and "Keep on Loving Me".

It was the last regular studio album to feature Sammy Strain, who left the group the following year.

== Track listing ==
No.	Title	Writer(s)	Producer(s)	Length
1.	"Don't Let Me Down"	Edward Willis Levert; Walter Lee Williams; Terry Duane Stubbs; Dwain Ray Mitchell	Eddie Levert; Walter Williams; Terry Stubbs; Dwain Mitchell	5:18
2.	"Something for Nothing"	Thomas Edward Faragher; Lotti Golden	The O'Jays; Tommy Faragher; Lotti Golden	4:59
3.	"Emotionally Yours (R&B Version)"	Robert Allen Zimmerman	Narada Michael Walden	5:15
4.	"Respect" (featuring The Jaz)	Levert; Williams; Stubbs; Jonathan Burks; Derrick "Doc" Pearson	Eddie Levert; Walter Williams; Terry Stubbs	4:20
5.	"Keep on Lovin' Me"	Levert; Williams; Stubbs; Mitchell	Eddie Levert; Walter Williams; Terry Stubbs; Dwain Mitchell	4:43
6.	"Love and Trust"	Levert; Williams; Stubbs; Mitchell	Eddie Levert; Walter Williams; Terry Stubbs; Dwain Mitchell	4:13
7.	"Don't You Know True Love"	Levert; Williams; Stubbs; Mitchell	Eddie Levert; Walter Williams; Terry Stubbs; Dwain Mitchell	4:08
8.	"Emotionally Yours (Gospel Version)"	Zimmerman	Ron Fair	5:01
9.	"That's How Love Is"	Levert; Williams; Stubbs; Mitchell	Eddie Levert; Walter Williams; Terry Stubbs; Dwain Mitchell	5:38
10.	"Closer to You"	Levert; Williams; Stubbs; Mitchell	Eddie Levert; Walter Williams; Terry Stubbs; Dwain Mitchell	3:58
11.	"If I Find Love Again"	Bruce Gray; Joseph Porrello; Dunn Pearson Jr.	Dunn Pearson; Eddie Levert (co.); Walter Williams (co.)	5:57
12.	"Keep on Pleasin' Me"	Levert; Williams; Stubbs; Mitchell	Eddie Levert; Walter Williams; Terry Stubbs; Dwain Mitchell	7:03
13.	"Lies"	Levert; Williams; Stubbs; Mitchell	Eddie Levert; Walter Williams; Terry Stubbs; Dwain Mitchell	4:18
14.	"Make It Feel Good"	Levert; Williams; Stubbs; Mitchell	Eddie Levert; Walter Williams; Terry Stubbs; Dwain Mitchell	4:22

== Personnel ==
- Eddie Levert – producer (tracks: 1, 2, 4–7, 9, 10, 12–14), co-producer (track 11), choir arranger (track 8)
- Walter Williams – producer (tracks: 1, 2, 4–7, 9, 10, 12–14), co-producer (track 11)
- Randy Bowland – guitar (tracks: 1, 4–10, 12–14)
- Russell Tompkins – saxophone (track 1)
- "Bassy" Bob Brockmann – trumpet (tracks: 1, 7), mixing (tracks: 1, 2, 4–7, 9–14), recording (track 8)
- Paul Jackson Jr. – guitar (track 2)
- Tommy Faragher – bass, keyboards, producer, recording engineer (track 2)
- Steve Forman – percussion (track 2)
- Sid Page – strings (track 2)
- Ron Fair – strings arranger (track 2), conductor (tracks: 2, 8), arranger & producer (track 8), executive producer
- Michael C. Ross – recording engineer (track 2)
- Lotti Golden – producer (track 2)
- Claytoven Richardson – additional backing vocals (track 3)
- Skyler Jett – additional backing vocals (track 3)
- Tony Lindsay – additional backing vocals (track 3)
- Stephan Bret Birnbaum – guitar (track 3)
- Louis Biancaniello – keyboards, synth arranger, programming (track 3)
- Narada Michael Walden – drums, arranger, producer (track 3)
- David Frazer – mixing (track 3)
- Mark Rayburn – additional engineering assistant (track 3)
- Jonathan "Jaz-O" Burks – rap vocals (track 4)
- James Lee Williams – bass (track 5)
- Andy Snitzer – tenor saxophone (tracks: 7, 8)
- Chris Botti – trumpet (tracks: 7, 8), orchestra contractor (track 8)
- Gerald Levert – choir vocals & choir arranger (track 8), rap vocals (track 13)
- Fonzi Thornton – choir vocals & choir contractor (track 8)
- Peter Cox – choir vocals (track 8)
- Evelyn "Champagne" King – choir vocals (track 8)
- James "J.T." Taylor – choir vocals (track 8)
- James Nelson Williams – choir vocals (track 8)
- William Anthony Brown – choir vocals (track 8)
- Cissy Houston – choir vocals (track 8)
- Phyllis Hyman – choir vocals (track 8)
- Sammy Strain – choir vocals (track 8)
- Tawatha Agee – choir vocals (track 8)
- Will Downing – choir vocals (track 8)
- Glenn Jones – choir vocals (track 8)
- Glynice Coleman – choir vocals (track 8)
- Keith Sweat – choir vocals (track 8)
- Marc Gordon – choir vocals (track 8)
- Sean Levert – choir vocals (track 8)
- Eric Gable – choir vocals (track 8)
- Leotis Clyborn – choir vocals (track 8)
- Sarah Dash – choir vocals (track 8)
- Genobia Jeter – choir vocals (track 8)
- Maurissa Rose – choir vocals (track 8)
- Harry Ray – choir vocals (track 8)
- Orfeh – choir vocals (track 8)
- Victor Bailey – bass (track 8)
- Richard Tee – piano & organ (track 8)
- Omar Hakim – drums (track 8)
- Roger Squitero – percussion (track 8)
- Lenny Pickett – tenor saxophone (track 8)
- Joseph Kimura – cello (track 8)
- Sarah Fiene – cello (track 8)
- William Galison – harmonica (track 8)
- Michael Davis – trombone (track 8)
- Herb Besson – trombone (track 8)
- David Taylor – bass trombone (track 8)
- Randy Brecker – trumpet (track 8)
- Alan Rubin – trumpet (track 8)
- Lew Soloff – trumpet (track 8)
- David Herndon – trumpet (track 8)
- Kent Smith – trumpet (track 8)
- Yoko Takabe-Gilbert – violin (track 8)
- Kerry McDermott – violin (track 8)
- Michael Gilbert – violin (track 8)
- Jenny Strenger – violin (track 8)
- Gary Levinson – violin (track 8)
- Hae Young Ham – violin (track 8)
- Sharon Yamada – violin (track 8)
- Chin Kim – violin (track 8)
- Donald Whyte – violin (track 8)
- Eric Ramme – violin (track 8)
- Kate Light – violin (track 8)
- Dan Reed – violin (track 8)
- Olivia Koppell – viola (track 8), violin (track 11)
- Juliet Haffner – viola (track 8)
- Dorian Rence – viola (track 8)
- Lois Martin – viola (track 8)
- Dunn Pearson Jr. – choir arranger (track 8), keyboards & producer (track 11)
- Terry Stubbs – producer (tracks: 1, 4–7, 9, 10, 12–14), choir arranger (track 8)
- Humberto Gatica – mixing (track 8)
- Christopher Savino – recording engineer assistant (track 8)
- Aaron Kropf – recording engineer assistant (track 8)
- Willie Ross – guitar (track 11)
- Tinker Barfield – bass (track 11)
- Brian Brake – drums (track 11)
- Jerome Najee Rasheed – alto and soprano saxophone (track 11)
- Joseph Joubert – acoustic piano (track 11)
- Bashiri Johnson – percussion (track 11)
- Joseph Malignaggi – violin (track 11)
- Seymour Barab – violin (track 11)
- Matthew Raimondi – violin (track 11)
- Harry Zaratzian – violin (track 11)
- Regis Iandiorio – violin (track 11)
- Elliot Rosoff – violin (track 11)
- Gerald Tarack – violin (track 11)
- Jose Fernandez – vocal engineering (track 11)
- Butch Jones – recording engineer (track 11)
- Dwain Mitchell – producer (tracks: 1, 5–7, 9, 10, 12–14)
- Ted Jensen – mastering
- Henry Marquez – art direction
- Lu Ann Graffeo – design
- Jeffrey Scales – photography

== Charts ==
Chart performance for Emotionally Yours
Chart (1991)	Peak position
US Billboard 200	73
US Top R&B Albums (Billboard)	2

== Certifications ==
Certifications for Emotionally Yours
Region	Certification	Certified units/sales
United States (RIAA)	Gold	500,000^{^}
^{^} Shipments figures based on certification alone.
