= Live at the Bottom Line =

Live album by Patti Austin
- Released: January 18, 1979
- Recorded: August 19, 1978
- Venue: The Bottom Line, New York City
- Genre: R&B
- Label: CTI; CTI 7086
- Producer: Creed Taylor

Patti Austin chronology
Havana Candy (1977)	Live at the Bottom Line (1979)	Body Language (1980)

Live at the Bottom Line is a live album by American vocalist and songwriter Patti Austin recorded in 1978 and released on the CTI label.

== Reception ==
The Allmusic review states, "There's more spontaneity, emotion, and charisma in the vocals on this album than on almost all her other releases combined".

Professional ratings
Review scores
Source	Rating
Allmusic	3/5 stars

== Track listing ==
1. "Jump for Joy" (Cynthia Biggs, Dexter Wansel) – 5:11
2. "Let It Ride" (Jermaine Jackson, Michael McGloiry, Gregory Williams) – 4:08
3. "One More Night" (Stephen Bishop) – 5:10
4. "Wait a Little While" (Eva Ein, Kenny Loggins) – 4:27
5. "Rider in the Rain" (Randy Newman) – 6:09
6. "You're the One That I Want" (John Farrar) – 3:27 Bonus track on CD reissue
7. "Love Me by Name" (Lesley Gore, Ellen Weston) – 5:16
8. "You Fooled Me" (Zane Grey, Len Ron Hanks) – 3:10
9. Spoken Introductions – 7:09 Bonus track on CD reissue
10. "Let's All Live and Give Together" (Billy Osborne, Jeffrey Osborne) – 6:41

== Personnel ==
- Patti Austin – vocals
- Michael Brecker – tenor saxophone
- Pat Rebillot – keyboards
- Leon Pendarvis, Jr. – leader, keyboards, arranger
- David Spinozza – guitar
- Will Lee – bass
- Charles Collins – drums
- Errol "Crusher" Bennett – percussion
- Babi Floyd, Frank Floyd, Ullanda McCullough – backing vocals
- Dave Grusin, Arthur Jenkins, Jr. – arranger

Technical

- David Hewitt, David Palmer, Rudy Van Gelder – engineer
- Sib Chalawick – album design
- Alen MacWeeney – photography
