= On the Way to Love =

Studio album by Patti Austin
- Released: June 26, 2001
- Studio: Dubie Grooves Studios (Santa Monica, California); Funky Joint Studios (Sherman Oaks, California); Schnee Studios and Extasy Recording Studios (North Hollywood, California); The Enterprise (Burbank, California)
- Genre: Jazz
- Length: 45:49
- Label: Warner Bros.
- Producer: Paul Brown; Steve Dubin; David "Kahlid" Woods

Patti Austin chronology
Street of Dreams (1999)	On the Way to Love (2001)	For Ella (2002)

On the Way to Love is a studio album by Patti Austin, released in 2001 on Warner Bros. Records. The album peaked at No. 21 on the US Billboard Top Contemporary Jazz Albums chart and No. 36 on the Billboard Top Jazz Albums chart.

== Critical reception ==
Professional ratings
Review scores
Source	Rating
AllMusic	3/5 stars
Dayton Daily News	(B+)

Derek Ali of the Dayton Daily News, in a B+ review noted, "Some songs neatly fit in light jazz, R&B and soft-rock categorizes, but it's difficult to pinpoint the style of singer who has performed with greats such as Dinah Washington, Sammy Davis Jr., Michael Jackson and George Benson. Austin's happy music is suitable for a drive along an ocean shore, cookouts and intimate dinners."

The Birmingham Mail exclaimed, "Patti's never made a duff record and her sublime new outing, released on her 53rd birthday, exudes class from every track."

William Ruhlmann of AllMusic, in a 3/5-star review wrote, "The songs indulge in street argot here and there, but this is an upscale effort for the most part, music for middle-aged Terry McMillan fans who aren't Waiting to Exhale anymore, but still don't want to work up a sweat. It's not bad, but Austin can do much better."

== Track listing ==
No.	Title	Writer(s)	Length
1.	"Girlfriend"	Patti Austin, Bill Meyers	4:01
2.	"What Can I Say?"	Allen Hinds	4:16
3.	"On the Way to Love"	Steve Dubin, Siedah Garrett	4:04
4.	"Love's Been Kind to Me Lately"	Patti Austin, Sue Ann Carwell, Roberto Vally	3:37
5.	"Make It Right"	Patti Austin, David Woods	4:27
6.	"If You Really Need Me Now"	John Stoddart	4:27
7.	"Playin' Around"	David Woods	3:55
8.	"Let Me Be Me"	Josie Aiello, Carl Burnett, Julie Gardner	4:26
9.	"Southern Rain"	David Woods	4:30
10.	"Tell Me Why"	Steve Dubin, Andrea Martin	4:33
11.	"Love's Been Kind to Me Lately" (Unplugged)	Patti Austin, Sue Ann Carwell, Roberto Vally	3:37

== Personnel ==
- Patti Austin – lead vocals (1–3, 5, 7–11), backing vocals (1, 2, 4, 5, 7–9, 11), vocals (4, 6)
- Bill Meyers – keyboards (1, 8), bass (1, 8), arrangements (1)
- Allen Hinds – keyboards (2), guitars (2), bass (2)
- Tim Heintz – keyboards (3, 10), bass (3, 10)
- Roberto Vally – keyboards (4), bass (4)
- Jerry Hey – additional keyboards (4), string arrangements and conductor (5), flugelhorn (6), additional keyboard arrangements (6), horn arrangements (6), synthesizers (11)
- Larry Williams – additional keyboards (4, 6), flute (6), synthesizers (11)
- David "Kahlid" Woods – keyboards (5, 7, 9), bass (5–7, 9), drum programming (5–7, 9), arrangements (5–7, 9), backing vocals (7, 9)
- Greg Phillinganes – Rhodes electric piano (6), vibraphone (8)
- Ricky Peterson – organ (7)
- L. Carl Burnett – guitars (1, 8), keyboards (8), bass (8), drum programming (8), arrangements (8)
- Mike Sims – guitars (3)
- Paul Jackson Jr. – guitars (4, 6, 10, 11)
- Tony Maiden – guitar voice box (5), backing vocals (5)
- Paul Brown – drum programming (1, 2, 4, 10), arrangements (1, 2, 4, 6, 11)
- Steve Dubin – drum programming (3), arrangements (3, 10)
- Lenny Castro – percussion (1, 6)
- Luis Conte – percussion (2, 5)
- Paulinho da Costa – percussion (9, 10)
- Boney James – saxophone (6)
- Siedah Garrett – backing vocals (3)
- Sue Ann Carwell – backing vocals (4, 11)
- James Ingram – vocals (6)
- Andrea Martin – backing vocals (10)

=== Production ===
- Paul Brown – producer, recording, mixing (3, 6, 8, 10, 11)
- Steve Dubin – co-producer (3, 10), recording (3, 10)
- David "Kahlid" Woods – co-producer (5, 7, 9)
- Dave Rideau – string recording (2, 5)
- Bill Schnee – mixing (2)
- Ed Cherney – mixing (4)
- Ray Bardani – mixing (5, 7, 9)
- L. Carl Burnett – recording (8)
- Koji Egawa – mix assistant (2, 8)
- Ronnie Rivera – mix assistant (4)
- Stewart Whitmore – digital editing
- Stephen Marcussen – mastering at Marcussen Mastering (Hollywood, California)
- Lexy Shroyer – production coordinator
- Carol Friedman – art direction, photography
- Tina Anderson – design
- Ellen Silverstein – stylist
- Oscar James – hair stylist
- Sam Fine – make-up
