= Sound Advice (Patti Austin album) =

Studio album by Patti Austin
- Released: January 25, 2011
- Studio: Capitol Studios (Hollywood, California); NRG Studios (North Hollywood, California); G Studios (Sherman Oaks, California); Greene Room (Van Nuys, California); The Village Recorder (West Los Angeles, California); Vision Studios (Valencia, California
- Genre: Jazz
- Length: 44:43
- Label: Shanachie
- Producer: Tena Clark; Patti Austin; Gregg Field; Shelly Berg; Greg Phillinganes

Patti Austin chronology
Avant Gershwin (2007)	Sound Advice (2011)	Mighty Musical Fairy Tales (2016)

Sound Advice is a studio album by Patti Austin, released in 2011 on Shanachie Records. The album peaked at No. 8 on the US Billboard Top Contemporary Jazz Albums chart and No. 15 on the US Billboard Top Jazz Albums chart.

== Critical reception ==
Professional ratings
Review scores
Source	Rating
AllMusic	2.5/5 stars
Dallas Morning News	(B+)
Associated Press	3/5 stars
Philadelphia Daily News	(A−)

Jonathan Takiff of the Philadelphia Daily News with praise wrote, "Best known for jazz/pop crossover collaborations with Quincy Jones, Patti Austin remains one of the most tasteful, convincing singers in the biz. So, no surprise, her themed collection of spirit pop "Sound Advice" (Shanachie, A−) is the stuff that could make a believer out of even a die-hard atheist."

Mario Tarradell of the Dallas Morning News exclaimed, "Vocal chameleon Patti Austin can take any song, no matter the genre, and make it her own. Sound Advice offers 10 covers and two Austin compositions, the soulful "Round & Round" and the lovely ballad "By the Grace of God."

Andy Kellman of AllMusic, in a 2.5/5-star review remarked, "Sound Advice, primarily a covers set, was recorded with Greg Phillinganes and with Shelly Berg and Gregg Field. It’s a mixed bag."

Charles J. Gans of the Associated Press noted, "Sound Advice - mostly covers of tunes by Bob Dylan, Brenda Russell, the Jacksons and others -- finds Austin returning to her soul, R&B and pop roots...Austin shows a more intimate, restrained side on several acoustic "unplugged" arrangements on which she's accompanied by pianist Shelly Berg."

== Track listing ==
No.	Title	Writer(s)	Length
1.	"You Gotta Be"	Ashley Ingram, Des'ree Weekes	4:58
2.	"By the Grace of God"	Patti Austin	3:35
3.	"Round and Round"	Greg Phillinganes, Patti Austin	4:30
4.	"You Can't Always Get What You Want"	Keith Richards, Michael Jagger	7:10
5.	"Let 'Em In"	Paul McCartney, Linda McCartney	4:41
6.	"Gotta Serve Somebody"	Bob Dylan	8:11
7.	"Vincent"	Don McLean	6:30
8.	"A Little Bit of Love"	Brenda Russell	4:37
9.	"Lean On Me"	Bill Withers	6:42
10.	"Give It Up"	Michael Jackson, Randy Jackson	4:28
11.	"My Way"	Claude Francois, Gilles Thibaut, Jacques Abel Jules Revaud, Paul Anka	5:15
12.	"Enjoy the Silence"	Martin Lee Gore	4:45

== Personnel ==
- Patti Austin – vocals, backing vocals (3–6, 8–10)
- Tim Heintz – keyboards (1), acoustic piano (1), organ (1)
- Greg Phillinganes – keyboards (1, 3–6, 8, 10, 12), acoustic piano (1, 9), arrangements (1, 3–6, 8, 10, 12), bass (3, 10, 12)
- Shelly Berg – keyboards (2, 11), acoustic piano (7)
- James Harrah – guitars (1)
- Dean Parks – guitars (2, 9, 11)
- Paul Jackson Jr. – guitars (4–6, 8)
- Freddie Washington – bass (1)
- Brian Bromberg – bass (2, 11)
- Ian Martin – bass (4–6, 8)
- Neil Stubenhaus – bass (9)
- Ricky Lawson – drums (1)
- Gregg Field – drums (2, 11)
- Trevor Lawrence Jr. – drums (3–6, 8, 10), percussion (3–6, 8, 10, 12)
- John Robinson – drums (9)
- Luis Conte – percussion (1)
- Alvin Chea – backing vocals (2)
- Carolyn Perry – backing vocals (2)
- Darlene Perry – backing vocals (2)
- Lorraine Perry – backing vocals (2)
- Lamont Van Hook – backing vocals (2–6, 8–10)
- Oren Waters – backing vocals (2)
- Fred White – backing vocals (2–6, 8–10)
- Lynne Fiddmont – backing vocals (3–6, 8–10)

The Fire Choir on "You Gotta Be"

- Bridgette Bryant, Alvin Chea, Lynne Fiddmont, Wendy Fraser, Dorian Holley, Clydene Jackson, Susie Stevens-Logan, Carmen Twillie, Oren Waters, Gerald White and Terry Wood

=== Production ===
- Barry Orms – A&R, management
- Tena Clark – producer (1)
- Patti Austin – producer (2–12)
- Shelly Berg – producer (2, 7, 11)
- Gregg Field – producer (2, 7, 11)
- Greg Phillinganes – producer (3–6, 8, 10, 12)
- Trevor Lawrence Jr. – additional production
- JoAnn Tominaga – additional production, production coordinator
- Ed Cherney – engineer
- Michael Frondelli – engineer
- Don Murray – engineer
- Richard Niles – engineer, mixing
- David Darlington – mastering at Bass Hit Studios (New York City, New York)
- Lorien Babajian – package design
- Albert Sanchez – photography
