= Do You Love Me (Patti Austin song) =

Single by Patti Austin

from the album Every Home Should Have One
- B-side: "Solero"
- Released: 1981
- Genre: Dance-pop
- Length: 3:22
- Label: Qwest
- Songwriter(s): Rod Temperton
- Producer(s): Quincy Jones

Patti Austin singles chronology
"Body Language" (1980)	"Do You Love Me" (1981)	"Razzamatazz" (1981)

"Do You Love Me" is a song written by British musician Rod Temperton and recorded by American singer-songwriter Patti Austin for her fourth studio album, Every Home Should Have One (1981). It was released in 1981 by Qwest Records as the album's first single. Along with the track "The Genie", the single peaked at number one on the dance charts for two weeks. Although "Do You Love Me" failed to chart on the Hot 100, it peaked at number twenty-four on the soul singles chart.

== Chart positions ==
Chart (1981)	Peak position
U.S. Billboard Hot Dance Club Play	1
U.S. Billboard Hot Soul Singles	24
U.K. United Kingdom UK Singles Chart	76
