= Every Home Should Have One (album) =

Studio album by Patti Austin
- Released: September 28, 1981
- Recorded: March 16 – May 31, 1981
- Studios: Westlake, Los Angeles; Mediasound, New York City
- Genres: R&B; pop
- Length: 37:25
- Label: Qwest
- Producer: Quincy Jones

Patti Austin chronology
Body Language (1980)	Every Home Should Have One (1981)	Patti Austin (1984)

Every Home Should Have One is the fourth studio album by American R&B/jazz singer Patti Austin, released on September 28, 1981, by Qwest Records. The album includes the number-one hit duet with James Ingram, "Baby, Come to Me", and the title track, "Every Home Should Have One", which peaked at number 62 on the Billboard Hot 100. She also scored with "Do You Love Me?", a #24 R&B & #1 Dance Chart hit.

The vinyl/cassette mix of the album differs from the CD mix. With the CD version some tracks are remixed, e.g. track 4 gains overdubs, and/or edited, e.g. track 5 loses the fade-in intro.

== Critical reception ==
Professional ratings
Review scores
Source	Rating
Allmusic	3.5/5 stars

Jason Elias of Allmusic, in a 3.5/5 star review wrote, "Every Home Should Have One doesn't possess Quincy Jones' all-encompassing production style of albums like The Dude and George Benson's Give Me the Night. While this seems like a debut album, it's far from it, but it's a perfect introduction to Austin and her more pop-orientated work."

== Track listing ==
No.	Title	Writer(s)	Length
1.	"Do You Love Me"	Rod Temperton	3:24
2.	"Love Me to Death"	Temperton	4:08
3.	"The Way I Feel"	Eric Kaz, Wendy Waldman	4:19
4.	"Every Home Should Have One"	Dominic Bugatti, Frank Musker	3:24
5.	"Baby, Come to Me" (with James Ingram)	Temperton	3:31
6.	"The Genie"	Temperton	3:57
7.	"Stop, Look, Listen"	Linda Creed, Thom Bell	3:06
8.	"Symphony of Love"	Rod Bowkett	3:39
9.	"Oh No Margarita"	Austin, Michael Boddicker	3:52
10.	"The Island"	Ivan Lins, Vitor Martins, Alan Bergman, Marilyn Bergman	3:46

== Personnel ==
Musicians and vocals

- Patti Austin – lead vocals, backing vocals
- James Ingram – backing vocals (1, 5), lead vocals (5)
- Greg Phillinganes – keyboards (1–3, 5, 6, 9), synthesizers (1–7, 10), synthesizer solo (2, 6)
- Michael Boddicker – synthesizers (1, 2, 5–10)
- David Foster – synthesizers (1, 5, 6)
- Rod Temperton – synthesizers (2, 5, 10)
- Richard Tee – acoustic piano (3), keyboards (4), Fender Rhodes (7, 8, 10)
- Bob James – synthesizers (3, 4, 8, 10), acoustic piano (10)
- Steve Lukather – guitars (1, 3–6, 9), acoustic guitar (2), electric guitar (2)
- Eric Gale – guitars (4, 7, 8, 10)
- Louis Johnson – bass guitar (1, 6)
- Eddie Watkins Jr. – bass guitar (3, 5, 9)
- Anthony Jackson – bass guitar (4, 7, 8, 10)
- John Robinson – drums (1–3, 5, 6, 9)
- Chris Parker – drums (4, 7, 8, 10)
- Paulinho da Costa – percussion (1–3, 5, 6, 9)
- Ralph MacDonald – percussion (4, 7, 8)
- Ernie Watts – tenor saxophone solo (4, 9)

Music arrangements

- Rod Temperton – rhythm arrangements (1, 2, 5–7), synthesizer arrangements (1, 2, 5, 6), vocal arrangements (1–6, 8)
- Quincy Jones – rhythm arrangements (3, 4, 7, 8), vocal arrangements (3, 4, 7), synthesizer arrangements (3, 7)
- Jerry Hey – synthesizer arrangements (3, 7)
- Patti Austin – vocal arrangements (4, 7–9), BGV arrangements (5)
- James Ingram – BGV arrangements (5)
- Michael Boddicker – rhythm and synthesizer arrangements (9)

=== Production ===
- Quincy Jones – producer
- Bruce Swedien – recording engineer, mixing
- Ed Cherney – assistant engineer
- Lincoln Clapp – assistant engineer
- Matt Forger – assistant engineer
- Brian Reeves – assistant engineer
- Bernie Grundman – mastering at A&M Studios (Hollywood, California)
- Roland Young – art direction, cover design concept
- Ed Eckstein – cover design concept
- Image Works – illustration
- Raul Vega – photography

== Charts ==
=== Weekly charts ===
Chart (1981–1983)	Peak position
UK Albums (Official Charts)	99
US Billboard 200	36
US Top R&B/Hip-Hop Albums (Billboard)	16

=== Year-end charts ===
Chart (1983)	Position
US Billboard 200	98
US Top R&B/Hip-Hop Albums (Billboard)	29

== Singles ==
Year	Single	Peak positions		
Year	Single	US R&B	US Hot 100	US A.C
1981	"Every Home Should Have One"	55	62	24
1981	"Baby, Come to Me" (with James Ingram)	9	1	1
1982	Do You Love Me (Patti Austin song)	24	-	-
