= Syreeta (1980 album) =

Studio album by Syreeta
- Released: April 26, 1980
- Recorded: 1979–1980
- Genres: Soul, R&B, pop
- Length: 39:02
- Label: Tamla
- Producers: Syreeta Wright, Hal Davis, Billy Preston, David Shire, Jerry Peters, Richard Perry

Syreeta chronology
Fast Break (1979)	Syreeta (1980)	Set My Love In Motion (1981)

Syreeta is the fourth solo album by Motown recording artist and American singer-songwriter Syreeta Wright (also known as "Syreeta"), released by the Tamla label on April 26, 1980. It's also the second album to be titled Syreeta after her 1972 debut album.

== Reception ==
Professional ratings
Review scores
Source	Rating
Allmusic	3/5 stars

The album was released shortly after Wright's duet with Billy Preston, "With You I'm Born Again", gave her the biggest charted success of her career. The album included Wright's take of her famous compositions, "I Blame It On the Sun", which she wrote for ex-husband Stevie Wonder's Talking Book and a funky take on Wonder's "Signed, Sealed, Delivered (I'm Yours)", which she also co-wrote. Wright provided lyrics and composition on one other song – "Dance For Me Children", with Curtis Robertson. Wright also collaborated with Preston on the album with the duets, "Please Stay" and "One More Time for Love", the latter duet charted modestly successful on the pop and R&B charts upon its release. The album features a smiling Wright in her trademark multi-colored braids.

== Track listing ==
1. "Blame It On The Sun" (Stevie Wonder, Wright) (4:20)
2. "Let Me Be The One" (Bill Withers, Skip Scarborough) (4:01)
3. "You Bring Out The Love In Me" (Kenneth Peterson) (3:30)
4. "Please Stay" (with Billy Preston) (Billy Preston, David Shire) (4:18)
5. "He's Gone" (George Goldner, Arlene Smith, Richard Barrett) (3:27)
6. "Love Fire" (Michelle Aller, Bob Esty) (4:51)
7. "Here's My Love" (Keith Echols, Anthony Miller) (3:27)
8. "Signed, Sealed, Delivered (I'm Yours)" (Stevie Wonder, Lula Mae Hardaway, Lee Garrett, Wright) (3:27)
9. "Dance For Me Children" (Wright, Curtis Robertson, Jr., Sheree Brown) (2:52)
10. "One More Time for Love" (with Billy Preston) (Jerry Peters) (3:51)
11. "One More Time for Love (reprise)" (0:58)

== Personnel ==
- Lead vocals: Syreeta
- Musicians:
- Drums: James Gadson, Leon "Ndugu" Chancler,Mike Baird,Harvey Mason,Ollie E. Brown, Joe Blocker, Melvin Webb
- Percussion: Paulinho da Costa, Lenny Castro
- Bass: Freddie Washington, Eddie N. Watkins, Jr., Scott Edwards
- Guitar: David T. Walker, Steve Lukather, Lee Ritenour, Paul Jackson Jr., Jay Graydon, Ray Parker Jr., Dennis Budimir, Greg Poree, Tim May, Ken Peterson
- Keyboards: Greg Mathieson, Jerry Peters, Richard Tee
- Backing vocals: Dorothy Ashby, Jerry Peters, Sheree Brown, Becky Lopez, Sherlie Matthews, Venetta Fields, Alfie Silas, Francine Howard, Voncielle Faggett, Gwen Matthews, Monalisa Young, Oma Drake, Terry Young
- Arrangement/Songwriting: Bob Esty, Dan Wyman, David Campbell, Sonny Burke, Arthur G. Wright, Trevor Veitch, Gary Coleman, Reggie McBride,David Shields

== Charts ==
Year	Album	Chart positions	
Year	Album	US	US R&B
1980	Syreeta (1980)	73	39

=== Singles ===
Year	Single	Chart positions		
Year	Single	US	US R&B	US Dance
1980	"One More Time for Love"	52	72	—
"—" denotes the single failed to chart
