= The Girl Who Used to Be Me =

Single by Patti Austin

from the album Love Is Gonna Getcha
- B-side: "Shirley Valentine End Title" (Marvin Hamlisch)
- Released: 1989
- Recorded: 1989
- Genre: Pop
- Length: 4:15
- Label: GRP
- Songwriters: Alan Bergman; Marilyn Bergman; Marvin Hamlisch
- Producer: David Paich

Patti Austin singles chronology
"Smoke Gets in Your Eyes" (1988)	"The Girl Who Used to Be Me" (1989)	"Any Other Fool" (1989)

Music video
- "The Girl Who Used to Be Me" on YouTube

"The Girl Who Used to Be Me" is a song written by Alan Bergman, Marilyn Bergman, and Marvin Hamlisch for the 1989 film Shirley Valentine and performed by Patti Austin. It was released as a 7-inch single and included as a bonus track on the CD release of Austin's 1990 album Love Is Gonna Getcha.

== Music and lyrics ==
The title character in Shirley Valentine is a 42-year-old housewife who feels taken for granted by her husband and children and accepts a free trip to Greece to give herself a holiday. "The Girl Who Used to Be Me" is heard during the opening credits and includes introductory lyrics not included on the 7-inch single or album releases; these lyrics summarize the character's experience of feeling ordered around and her decision to go away. The film only uses one additional verse and one chorus from the recordings available commercially. The rest of the lyrics use the metaphor of a bird being free to fly, even if hampered by setbacks. The singer recalls her girlhood when she was happy and free to decide her own path and wants her life to be that way again.

The song is in the key of F Minor.

== Critical reception ==
In reviews of Love Is Gonna Getcha, "The Girl Who Used to Be Me" received varying comments. Jonathan Widran of AllMusic wrote that the song "gives Austin a chance to show her range, even if the tune is a bit schmaltzy." Phyl Garland of Stereo Review described the song as "an earnest ballad that she endows with plenty of emotion."

== Accolades ==
"The Girl Who Used to Be Me" was nominated for the Academy Award and Golden Globe Award for Best Original Song. It also received a Grammy nomination in the category of Best Song Written Specifically for a Motion Picture or Television.

== Live performances ==
Austin performed "The Girl Who Used to Be Me" at the Academy Awards when it was nominated in 1990. She also sang it at the Samuel Goldwyn Theater in 2009 as part of a tribute to the song's lyricists, Alan and Marilyn Bergman, by the Academy of Motion Picture Arts and Sciences.

== Personnel ==
From the liner notes for Love Is Gonna Getcha:

- Patti Austin – vocals
- Lenny Castro – percussion
- Michael Landau – guitars
- David Paich – keyboards, synthesizers
- Jeff Porcaro – drums
- Steve Porcaro – synthesizers

== Production ==
From the liner notes for Love Is Gonna Getcha:

- David Paich – producer, arranger
- Bob Schaper – engineering, mixing
- Tom Knox – additional engineering

== Bibliography ==
- O'Neil, Thomas (1999), The Grammys, Perigree Books, ISBN 0-39952-477-0
- O'Neil, Thomas (2003), Movie Awards: The Ultimate, Unofficial Guide to the Oscars, Golden Globes, Critics, Guild & Indie Honors, Perigree Books, ISBN 978-0-39952-922-1
- Wiley, Mason; Bona, Damien (1996), Inside Oscar: The Unofficial History of the Academy Awards, Ballantine Books, ISBN 0-345-40053-4
