= Serious (The O'Jays album) =

Studio album by the O'Jays
- Released: 1989
- Studio: Sigma Sound, O'Henry Sound Studios, Kopperhead Studios
- Genre: R&B, soul
- Label: EMI
- Producer: Gerald Levert and Marc Gordon ("Out of My Mind" and "Rainbow"); Dennis Lambert ("Never Been Better"); Walter Williams, Eddie Levert Sr. and Terry Stubbs (all others)

The O'Jays chronology
Let Me Touch You (1987)	Serious (1989)	Emotionally Yours (1991)

Serious is an album by the American musical group the O'Jays, released in 1989. It was the group's first album for EMI Records. "Out of My Mind" and "Have You Had Your Love Today?" were released as singles. The O'Jays supported the album by playing the Hampton Jazz Festival and touring with LeVert.

The album peaked at No. 114 on the Billboard 200. Serious was regarded as a comeback album.

== Production ==
Eddie Levert wanted to modernize the group's sound by heeding his sons' musical advice. Gerald Levert coproduced four of the album's songs. "Pot Can't Call the Kettle Black" is about parents criticizing the musical tastes of their children. "Have You Had Your Love Today?" was influenced rhythmically by Eddie Kendrick's "Keep On Truckin'".

== Critical reception ==
Professional ratings
Review scores
Source	Rating
AllMusic	3/5 stars
Chicago Tribune	3/4 stars
MusicHound Rock: The Essential Album Guide	2/5 stars
The Philadelphia Inquirer	3/4 stars
The Rolling Stone Album Guide	2.5/5 stars
The Virgin Encyclopedia of R&B and Soul	2/5 stars

The Chicago Tribune deemed the album "a nice mix of dance cuts and romantic ballads." The Philadelphia Inquirer called it "a model example of how to update your style without selling out." LA Weekly opined that "Eddie with his gale-force vocals and Walter Williams with his cool baritone and measured tenor squalls are still the best vocal tandem in male-group soul." The Buffalo News concluded that the group "may be one of the last remaining examples of the raw rhythmic emotion that gave birth to that particular niche of music called rhythm 'n' blues."

AllMusic wrote that the group "opted for a more high-tech 'urban contemporary' approach with Serious... Obviously well aware of what younger R&B units like Guy, Levert ... and Today were up to, the veteran soulsters incorporated 'new jack swing' and hip-hop elements and made it clear they were intent on changing with the times." The Rolling Stone Album Guide noted that "the younger generation's skittery hip-hop beats don't mesh with the old man's rock-solid R&B foundation."

== Track listing ==
No.	Title	Writer(s)	Length
1.	"Out of My Mind"	Gerald Levert, Marc Gordon	4:15
2.	"Leave It Alone"	Walter Williams, Terry Stubbs, Eddie Levert, Dwayne Mitchell	4:46
3.	"Have You Had Your Love Today?"	Derrick Pearson, Stubbs	5:14
4.	"Serious Hold on Me"	Lewis Christian, Williams, Stubbs	5:36
5.	"Friend of a Friend"	Williams, Stubbs, E. Levert, Mitchell	4:43
6.	"Never Been Better"	Dennis Lambert, Franne Golde	2:48
7.	"Rainbow"	G. Levert, Gordon	4:45
8.	"Fading"	Terry Scott, Stubbs	6:41
9.	"Pot Can't Call the Kettle Black"	Williams, E. Levert, Mitchell, Stubbs	4:40
