= The Real Me (Patti Austin album) =

Studio album by Patti Austin
- Released: August 1988
- Studios: Atlantic Studios and The Hit Factory (New York City, New York); Ocean Way Recording (Hollywood, California); Pack's Place (Sunland, California)
- Genre: Jazz
- Length: 52:18
- Label: Qwest
- Producer: David Pack

Patti Austin chronology
| Gettin' Away with Murder (1985) | The Real Me (1988) | Love Is Gonna Getcha (1990) |

The Real Me is a studio album by American singer Patti Austin released in 1988 on Qwest Records. The album peaked at No. 7 on the US Billboard Top Contemporary Jazz Albums chart.

== Critical reception ==
Professional ratings
Review scores
| Source | Rating |
|---|---|
| Allmusic | 4/5 stars |

William C. Trott of UPI declared, "Patti Austin says she grew up in a household where anything from Stravinsky to Muddy Waters was likely to be on the turntable (her father was a Big Band trombonist) and she seems to have chosen the middle ground. 'The Real Me' Austin speaks of emerges here in the works (of) Jerome Kern, Cole Porter and the Gershwins. The album is a tribute to the songs and singers that shaped Austin and the one-time child prodigy also shapes the songs herself on 'The Real Me,' filling them with her own soul and meaning."

William Rhulmann of Allmusic, in a 4/5 star review proclaimed, "Austin tackles standards such as "Smoke Gets in Your Eyes" and "They Can't Take That Away from Me," and succeeds brilliantly."

Robert K. Oermann of USA Today with praise said, "I smiled from ear to ear: This is a complete delight from start to finish. Best known for contemporary sounds such as "Heat of Heat," "Rhythm of the Streets" and "Baby, Come to Me," Austin here reaches to the past for inspiration."

== Track listing ==
1. "I Can Cook Too" (Leonard Bernstein, Betty Comden, Adolph Green) - 5:14
2. "Stockholm Sweetnin'" (Quincy Jones) - 1:37
3. "Smoke Gets in Your Eyes" (Jerome Kern, Otto Harbach) - 4:15
4. "True Love" (Cole Porter) - 3:49
5. "Across the Alley From the Alamo" (Joe Greene) - 3:47
6. "How Long Has This Been Going On?" (George Gershwin, Ira Gershwin) - 4:07
7. "Lazy Afternoon" (Jerome Moross, John La Touche) - 5:46
8. "Love Letters" (Victor Young, Edward Heyman) - 3:55
9. "They Can't Take That Away From Me" (George Gershwin, Ira Gershwin) - 3:59
10. "Mood Indigo" (Duke Ellington, Barney Bigard, Irving Mills) - 3:26
11. "Cry Me a River" (Arthur Hamilton) - 4:21
12. "Someone Is Standing Outside" (Jimmy Webb) - 3:54
13. "Spring Can Really Hang You Up The Most" (Tommy Wolf, Fran Landesman) - 5:08

== Personnel ==
Musicians

- Patti Austin – vocals, percussion (5), bass guitar (7)
- David Benoit – synthesizers (1, 8, 10), organ (1), keyboards (3, 4, 7, 9), Yamaha DX7 (6, 13), synth horns (9), synth strings (9, 11, 12), acoustic piano (10, 11)
- Greg Phillinganes – synth horns (1), synth bass (1, 9)
- Bruce Hornsby – accordion (5)
- Michael McDonald – acoustic piano (8)
- Richard Tee – acoustic piano (8, 12), Yamaha DX7 (12)
- David Pack – guitars (1, 7), electronic congas (3), acoustic guitar (5), baritone guitar (5), percussion (5), electronic percussion (7)
- David Lindley – lap steel guitar (5), slide guitar (5)
- Earl Klugh – classical guitar (7), guitars (10)
- Nathan East – bass guitar (3)
- Roscoe Beck – electric upright bass (4), bass guitar (8)
- Chuck Domanico – bass guitar (10, 11)
- Joe Puerta – bass guitar (12)
- Vinnie Colaiuta – drums (1)
- George Perilli – drums (3, 9), percussion (4)
- Jeff Porcaro – drums (4, 7)
- John Robinson – drums (8, 12)
- Paulinho da Costa – percussion (3, 5, 7)
- Burleigh Drummond – percussion (5)
- Dan Higgins – saxophones (1, 9), woodwinds (1, 9)
- Ernie Watts – saxophone solo (3, 8)
- Michael Brecker – saxophone solo (4)
- Greg Huckins – saxophones (10)
- Bill Reichenbach Jr. – trombone (1, 9)
- Bill Watrous – trombone (10)
- Gary Grant – trumpet (1, 9)
- Jerry Hey – trumpet (1, 9)
- Jon Faddis – flugelhorn solo (7), trumpet solo (11)
- John Rotella – clarinet (10)
- Red Callender – tuba (10)
- Gayle Levant – harp (6)

Background vocals

- Patti Austin – backing vocals (1, 3, 7, 10, 12)
- David Pack – vocals (4), backing vocals (5, 8, 12)
- James Ingram – backing vocals (5, 8, 12)
- Michael McDonald – backing vocals (5, 8, 12)
- Howard Hewett – backing vocals (12)
- Amy Holland – backing vocals (12)
- Luther Vandross – backing vocals (12)
- Tata Vega – backing vocals (12)

Music arrangements

- Patti Austin – vocal arrangements (1–5, 7, 9, 10, 12), arrangements (3, 7, 9, 10), horn arrangements (9)
- David Pack – arrangements (1, 3–5, 7–9), horn arrangements (1, 5, 9), vocal arrangements (4, 5, 7–9, 12),
- Jerry Hey – horn arrangements (1, 9)
- Greg Phillinganes – horn arrangements (1), vocal arrangements (9)
- David Benoit – arrangements (3, 7, 9), keyboard arrangements (6), horn arrangements (9)
- James Ingram – vocal arrangements (8)
- Michael McDonald – vocal arrangements (8)
- Jimmie Haskell – horn arrangements and conductor (10)
- Jimmy Webb – arrangements (12)

Strings (Tracks 4, 6, 11 & 13)

- David Benoit – string arrangements (4)
- Marty Paich – string arrangements and conductor (6, 11, 13)
- Arnold Belnick, Chuck Berghofer, Jackie Brand, Franklyn D'Antonio, Alan DeVeritch, Bonnie Douglas, Arni Egilsson, Richard Elegino, Steve Erdody, Henry Ferber, James Getzoff, Barry Gold, Harris Goldman, Nathan Kaproff, Ray Kelley, Joy Lyle, Michael Markman, Donald McInnes, Cynthia Morrow, Dan Neufeld, Nils Oliver, Daniel Rothmuller, Art Royval, Sid Sharp, Harry Shlutz, Henry Shure, Vicky Sylvester, Charles Veal, Evan Wilson and Herschel Wise – string players

== Production ==
- Patti Austin – executive producer, associate producer
- David Pack – producer
- Ben Rodgers – engineer (1–10, 12, 13), mixing (1–10, 12, 13), additional recording (7, 9, 11, 13)
- Ross Pallone – mixing (1, 3, 5)
- Allen Sides – string recording (4, 6, 11, 13)
- Mark Linett – engineer (7, 9), additional recording (10)
- Rik Pekkonen – mixing (7, 10, 12)
- James Guthrie – engineer (11)
- James Farber – additional recording (11, 12)
- Russ Castillo – assistant engineer
- Steve Holroyd – assistant engineer
- Michael Mason – assistant engineer
- Ira McLaughlin – assistant engineer
- Ira Rubinez – assistant engineer
- Joe Schiff – assistant engineer
- Roger Talkov – assistant engineer
- Shari Sutcliffe – production coordinator
- Lu Snead – project coordinator
- Mary Ann Dibs – art direction
- Mark Raboy – photography
- Danny Wintrode – styling, hair
- Craig Gatson – make-up
- Lenny York – clothing
- Ken Fritz – management

== Charts ==
| Chart (1988) | Peak position |
|---|---|
| US Billboard Top Contemporary Jazz Albums | 7 |
| US Billboard Top Soul Albums | 56 |
