= Paul Jackson Jr. =

American musician (born 1959)

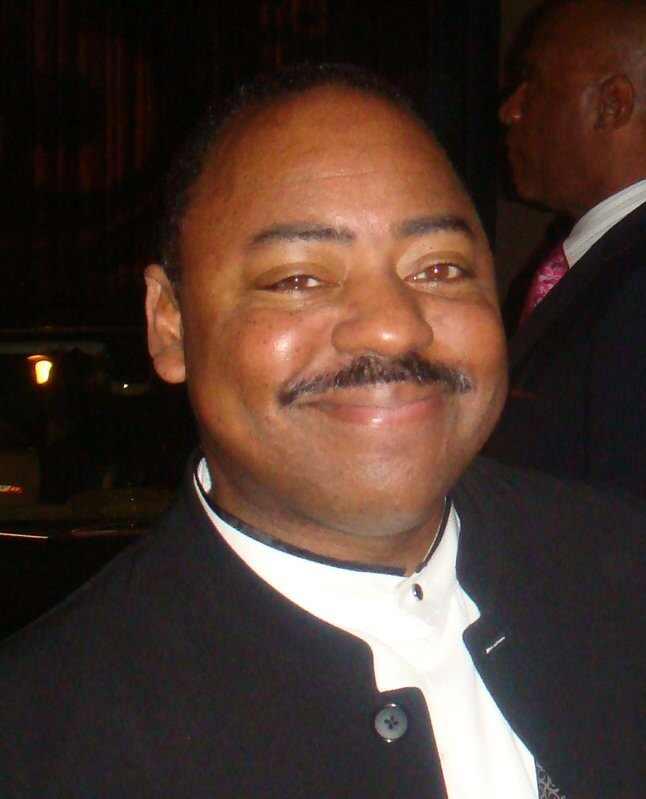
- Jackson in 2008

Background information
- Born: Paul Milton Jackson Jr. December 30, 1959 (age 66)
- Origin: Los Angeles, California, United States
- Genres: Jazz; jazz fusion; smooth jazz; rock; pop; funk; R&B; soul
- Occupations: Musician; songwriter; guitarist; producer
- Instruments: Guitar; bass guitar
- Years active: Musician: 1976–present Actor: 1974–1976
- Labels: Atlantic; Blue Note; Branch
- Website: www.pauljacksonjr.net

Paul Milton Jackson Jr. (born December 30, 1959) is an American jazz fusion guitarist, composer, arranger, and producer, and former child actor.

His first acting role was a guest starring role as Tank, a member of the Junior Warlords gang in Chicago on an episode of Good Times Season 4 Episode 4 entitled "Michael the Warlord." In addition to being a recording artist in his own right, Jackson is also a session player, with a career spanning multiple decades. He has supported artists ranging from Michael Jackson (no relation) (on the albums Thriller, Bad, Dangerous, HIStory and Blood on the Dance Floor: HIStory in the Mix) to the Temptations, Whitney Houston, Alexander O'Neal, Five Star (on the album Silk and Steel), Howard Hewett, Thomas Anders, Patti LaBelle and Luis Miguel, to rockers such as Chicago and Elton John, to jazz-oriented players such as George Duke, George Benson, Dave Koz, Al Jarreau, David Benoit, Marcus Miller and Kirk Whalum, and to Christian artists such as Leon Patillo and Don Moen.

He contributed to several tracks on the album Random Access Memories by Daft Punk and UK based singer songwriter Birdy's second album Fire Within. He also played guitar on Lisa Stansfield's 2014 album, Seven.

Jackson played guitar in a wide variety of styles on The Tonight Show With Jay Leno and American Idol.

== Discography ==
=== As leader ===
- I Came to Play (1988, Atlantic)
- Out of the Shadows (1990, Atlantic)
- A River in the Desert (1993, Atlantic)
- Never Alone: Duets (1996, Blue Note)
- The Power of the String (2001, Blue Note)
- Still Small Voice (2003, Blue Note)
- Lay It Back (2008, Branch)
- Stories from Stompin' Willie (2016, Branch)

=== With 'Jazz Funk Soul' (Jeff Lorber/Everette Harp/Paul Jackson Jr.) ===
- Life and Times (2019, Shanachie)
- Forecast (2022, Shanachie)

=== Session musician credits ===
With Oleta Adams

- All the Love (Pioneer Entertainment, 2001)

With Alessi Brothers

- Driftin' (A&M Records, 1979)

With Deborah Allen

- Telepathy (RCA Victor, 1987)

With America

- Perspective (Capitol, 1984)

With Anastacia

- Not That Kind (Epic, 2000)

With Jon Anderson

- In the City of Angels (Columbia, 1988)

With Bob James & David Sanborn

- Double Vision (Warner Bros., 1986)

With Paul Anka

- Somebody Loves You (Polydor, 1989)

With India Arie

- Christmas with Friends (Motown, 2015)

With Patti Austin

- Patti Austin (Qwest, 1984)
- Gettin' Away with Murder (Qwest, 1985)
- On the Way to Love (Warner Bros., 2001)
- Sound Advice (Shanachie, 2011)

With Joan Baez

- Recently (Gold Castle, 1987)

With Philip Bailey

- Continuation (Columbia Records, 1983)
- The Wonders of His Love (Myrrh, 1985)
- Triumph (Word, 1986)

With Anita Baker

- The Songstress (Elektra, 1983)
- Rapture (Elektra, 1986)
- Giving You the Best That I Got (Elektra, 1988)
- Rhythm of Love (Elektra, 1994)
- My Everything (Blue Note, 2004)

With George Benson

- 20/20 (Warner Bros., 1985)
- While the City Sleeps... (Warner Bros., 1986)
- Twice the Love (Warner Bros., 1988)
- Standing Together (GRP, 1998)
- Songs and Stories (Concord, 2009)
- Guitar Man (Concord, 2011)

With Stephen Bishop

- Sleeping with Girls (Big Pink, 1985)

With Michael Bolton

- All That Matters (Columbia, 1997)

With Laura Branigan

- Self Control (Atlantic, 1984)

With Randy Brown

- Intimately (Parachute, 1979)

With Peabo Bryson

- Straight from the Heart (Elektra, 1984)
- All My Love (Capitol, 1989)
- Can You Stop the Rain (Columbia, 1991)
- Unconditional Love (Private Music, 1999)
- Missing You (Concord, 2007)

With Solomon Burke

- The Definition Of Soul (Virgin, 1997)

With Donald Byrd

- Thank You...For F.U.M.L. (Funking Up My Life) (Elektra, 1978)

With Irene Cara

- Carasmatic (Elektra, 1987)

With Jean Carn

- Sweet and Wonderful (TSOP, 1981)
- Trust Me (Motown, 1982)

With Belinda Carlisle

- Live Your Life Be Free (Virgin, 1991)

With Felix Cavaliere

- Dreams in Motion (MCA Records, 1994)

With Ray Charles

- My World (Warner Bros. Records, 1993)

With Chicago

- Chicago 17 (Warner Bros., 1984)

With The Stanley Clarke Band

- Up (Mack Avenue, 2014)

With Leonard Cohen

- The Future (Columbia, 1992)

With Natalie Cole

- I'm Ready (Epic, 1983)
- Dangerous (Atco, 1985)
- Everlasting (Elektra, 1987)
- Good to Be Back (Elektra, 1989)
- Holly & Ivy (Elektra, 1994)
- Stardust (Elektra, 1996)
- Leavin' (Verve, 2006)

With Commodores

- Commodores 13 (Motown, 1983)
- Rock Solid (Polydor, 1988)

With Randy Crawford

- Windsong (Warner Bros., 1982)
- Abstract Emotions (Warner Bros., 1986)
- Through the Eyes of Love (Warner Bros., 1992)
- Don't Say It's Over (Warner Bros., 1993)

With Clark Datchler

- Raindance (Virgin Records, 1990)

With DeBarge

- The DeBarges (Gordy, 1981)
- In a Special Way (Gordy, 1983)
- Rhythm of the Night (Gordy, 1985)
- Bad Boys (Striped Horse, 1987)

With The 5th Dimension

- In the House (Columbia, 1995)

With Céline Dion

- Unison (Columbia, 1990)
- A New Day Has Come (Columbia, 2002)

With Will Downing

- Invitation Only (Mercury, 1997)

With George Duke

- Thief in the Night (Elektra Records, 1985)

With Sheena Easton

- Best Kept Secret (EMI, 1983)
- No Strings (MCA, 1993)

With José Feliciano

- José Feliciano (Motown, 1981)
- Ya Soy Tuyo (RCA, 1985)
- Te Amaré (RCA, 1986)

With Roberta Flack

- Oasis (Atlantic, 1988)

With Four Tops

- One More Mountain (Casablanca, 1982)
- Magic (Motown, 1985)
- Indestructible (Arista, 1988)

With Aretha Franklin

- Aretha (Arista, 1980)
- What You See Is What You Sweat (Arista, 1991)
- This Christmas, Aretha (DMI, 2008)

With Michael Franks

- Dragonfly Summer (Warner Bros., 1993)

With Glenn Frey

- Soul Searchin' (MCA, 1988)

With Richie Furay

- Seasons of Change (Myrrh Records, 1982)

With Gloria Gaynor

- Gloria Gaynor (Atlantic, 1982)

With Amy Grant

- Unguarded (A&M, 1985)

With Tramaine Hawkins

- To a Higher Place (Columbia, 1994)

With High Inergy

- Frenzy (Gordy, 1979)
- Hold On (Gordy, 1980)

With Thelma Houston

- Thelma Houston (MCA, 1983)
- Qualifying Heat (MCA, 1984)

With Whitney Houston

- Whitney Houston (Arista Records, 1985)
- Whitney (Arista, 1987)
- I'm Your Baby Tonight (Arista Records, 1990)

With Phyllis Hyman

- I Refuse to Be Lonely (Philadelphia, 1995)

With Imagination

- Closer (RCA Records, 1987)

With James Ingram

- It's Your Night (Qwest, 1983)
- Never Felt So Good (Qwest, 1986)
- It's Real (Qwest, 1989)
- Always You (Qwest, 1993)
- Stand (In the Light) (Intering, 2008)

With Paul Jabara

- The Third Album (Casablanca, 1979)

With Jermaine Jackson

- Let's Get Serious (Motown, 1980)
- I Like Your Style (Motown, 1981)
- Let Me Tickle Your Fancy (Motown, 1982)
- Jermaine Jackson (Arista, 1984)
- Precious Moments (Arista, 1986)

With La Toya Jackson

- La Toya Jackson (Polydor, 1980)
- Imagination (Epic Records, 1986)

With Michael Jackson

- Thriller (Epic, 1982)
- Bad (Epic, 1987)
- Dangerous (Epic, 1991)

With Al Jarreau

- High Crime (Warner Bros., 1984)
- Heart's Horizon (Reprise, 1988)
- Tomorrow Today (GRP, 2000)
- All I Got (GRP, 2002)
- My Old Friend: Celebrating George Duke (Concord, 2014)

With Jewel

- Spirit (Atlantic, 1998)

With Dr. John

- In a Sentimental Mood (Warner Bros. Records, 1989)

With Elton John

- Duets (Rocket, 1993)

With Chaka Khan

- Chaka Khan (Warner Bros., 1982)

With Bobby King

- Bobby King (Warner Bros. Records, 1981)

With B. B. King

- Take It Home (MCA, 1979)

With Carole King

- Love Makes the World (Rockingale, 2001)

With Gladys Knight & the Pips

- Life (Columbia, 1985)

With Gladys Knight

- Just for You (MCA Records, 1994)

With Patti LaBelle

- Winner in You (MCA, 1986)

With Queen Latifah

- The Dana Owens Album (A&M Records, 2004)
- Trav'lin' Light (Verve Records, 2007)

With Kenny Loggins

- Vox Humana (Columbia, 1985)
- Leap of Faith (Columbia, 1991)

With Jon Lucien

- Listen Love (Mercury, 1991)
- Mother Nature's Son (Mercury, 1993)

With Cheryl Lynn

- In Love (Columbia, 1979)
- Start Over (EMI, 1987)
- Whatever It Takes (Virgin, 1989)

With Madonna

- True Blue (Warner Bros., 1986)

With Melissa Manchester

- Mathematics (MCA, 1985)

With Barry Manilow

- If I Should Love Again (Arista, 1981)
- Here Comes the Night (Arista, 1982)
- Manilow (RCA, 1985)
- Swing Street (Arista, 1987)
- This Is My Town: Songs of New York (Decca, 2017)

With Teena Marie

- Robbery (Epic, 1983)

With Amanda Marshall

- Tuesday's Child (Epic, 1999)

With Johnny Mathis

- Right from the Heart (Columbia Records, 1985)

With Letta Mbulu

- Sounds Of a Rainbow (Munjale, 1980)

With The McCrarys

- On the Other Side (Portrait, 1979)

With Michael McDonald

- Blink of an Eye (Reprise, 1993)

With Bobby McFerrin

- Bang!Zoom (Blue Note, 1995)

With Glenn Medeiros

- Not Me (Mercury, 1988)
- Glenn Medeiros (Mercury, 1990)

With Bill Medley

- Right Here and Now (Planet Records, 1982)

With Sérgio Mendes

- Arara (A&M Records, 1989)
- Brasileiro (Elektra Records, 1992)
- Oceano (Verve Records, 1996)
- Encanto (Concord Records, 2008)
- In the Key of the Joy (Concord Records, 2020)

With Idina Menzel

- Holiday Wishes (Warner Bros., 2014)
- Christmas: A Season of Love (Decca, 2019)

With Bette Midler

- Bette (Warner Bros., 2000)

With Stephanie Mills

- I've Got the Cure (Casablanca, 1984)
- Stephanie Mills (MCA, 1985)

With Melba Moore

- Soul Exposed (Orpheus, 1990)

With Keb' Mo'

- Peace... Back by Popular Demand (Sony, 2004)

With Aaron Neville

- The Grand Tour (A&M, 1993)
- Aaron Neville's Soulful Christmas (A&M, 1993)

With The O'Jays

- Emotionally Yours (EMI, 1991)

With The Originals

- Come Away With Me (Fantasy, 1979)

With Jeffrey Osborne

- Jeffrey Osborne (A&M, 1982)
- Stay with Me Tonight (A&M, 1983)
- Don't Stop (A&M, 1984)
- Emotional (A&M, 1985)
- One Love – One Dream (A&M, 1988)
- Something Warm for Christmas (Koch, 1997)
- A Time for Love (Saguaro, 2013)

With Pages

- Pages (Capitol Records, 1981)

With Ray Parker Jr.

- Sex and the Single Man (Arista, 1985)
- After Dark (Geffen, 1987)

With Freda Payne

- Hot (Capitol, 1979)

With Teddy Pendergrass

- Love Language (Asylum Records, 1984)
- Workin' It Back (Asylum Records, 1985)
- Truly Blessed (Elektra Records, 1991)

With Greg Phillinganes

- Significant Gains (Planet, 1981)

With June Pointer

- Baby Sister (Planet Records, 1983)

With The Pointer Sisters

- Special Things (Planet, 1980)
- Black & White (Planet, 1981)
- So Excited! (Planet, 1982)
- Hot Together (RCA Records, 1986)
- Serious Slammin' (RCA Records, 1988)
- Right Rhythm (Motown, 1990)

With Billy Preston

- Late at Night (Motown, 1979)
- The Way I Am (Motown, 1981)

With Billy Preston and Syreeta Wright

- Billy Preston & Syreeta (Motown, 1981)

With Corinne Bailey Rae

- The Heart Speaks in Whispers (Virgin, 2016)

With Helen Reddy

- Reddy (Capitol Records, 1979)
- Imagination (MCA Records, 1983)

With Cliff Richard

- Real as I Wanna Be (EMI, 1998)

With Lionel Richie

- Lionel Richie (Motown, 1982)

With Minnie Riperton

- Love Lives Forever (Capitol, 1980)

With Bruce Roberts

- Intimacy (Atlantic Records, 1995)

With Smokey Robinson

- Where There's Smoke... (Tamla, 1979)
- Being with You (Motown, 1981)
- Essar (Motown, 1984)
- Love, Smokey (Motown, 1990)
- Gasms (TLR, 2023)
- What the World Needs Now (Gaither, 2025)

With Kenny Rogers

- Christmas (Liberty, 1981)
- Love Will Turn You Around (Liberty, 1982)
- We've Got Tonight (Liberty, 1983)
- What About Me? (RCA, 1984)
- The Heart of the Matter (RCA, 1985)

With Kenny Rogers and Dolly Parton

- Once Upon a Christmas (Elektra, 1984)

With Patrice Rushen

- Patrice (Elektra, 1978)
- Pizzazz (Elektra, 1979)
- Straight from the Heart (Elektra, 1982)
- Signature (Discovery, 1997)

With Jennifer Rush

- Heart Over Mind (Epic, 1987)

With Brenda Russell

- Get Here (A&M, 1988)

With Carole Bayer Sager

- Sometimes Late at Night (Boardwalk, 1981)

With David Sanborn

- Close Up (Reprise, 1988)

With Boz Scaggs

- Other Roads (Columbia, 1988)

With Lalo Schifrin

- No One Home (Tabu, 1979)

With Scritti Politti

- Cupid & Psyche 85 (Virgin/Warner Bros. Records, 1985)

With Dan Seals

- Stones (Atlantic Records, 1980)

With Jon Secada

- Secada (Virgin, 1997)

With Jessica Simpson

- A Public Affair (Epic Records, 2006)

With Lisa Stansfield

- Seven (Edel, 2014)

With The Staple Singers

- The Staple Singers (Private Records, 1985)

With Brenda K. Starr

- By Heart (Epic Records, 1991)

With Steely Dan

- Two Against Nature (Warner Bros. Records, 2000)

With Rod Stewart

- Vagabond Heart (Warner Bros., 1991)
- Soulbook (J Records, 2009)

With Barbra Streisand

- Emotion (Columbia, 1984)
- Till I Loved You (Columbia, 1988)

With Donna Summer

- Bad Girls (Casablanca, 1979)
- Cats Without Claws (Geffen, 1984)
- All Systems Go (Geffen, 1987)

With Russ Taff

- Medals (Myrrh Records, 1985)

With Tavares

- Supercharged (Capitol, 1980)
- Love Uprising (Capitol, 1980)
- Loveline (Capitol, 1981)

With The Temptations

- Power (Gordy, 1980)
- Back to Basics (Gordy, 1983)
- Surface Thrills (Gordy, 1983)
- Truly for You (Gordy, 1984)
- Touch Me (Gordy, 1985)
- Together Again (Motown, 1987)
- Special (Motown, 1989)
- Milestone (Motown, 1991)
- For Lovers Only (Motown, 1995)

With The Manhattan Transfer

- Tonin' (Atlantic, 1995)
- The Junction (BMG, 2018)

With Frankie Valli

- Heaven Above Me (MCA, 1980)

With Dionne Warwick

- How Many Times Can We Say Goodbye (Arista, 1983)
- Finder of Lost Loves (Arista, 1985)
- Friends Can Be Lovers (Arista, 1993)

With The Weeknd

- Starboy (XO, 2016)

With The Whispers

- Whisper in Your Ear (Solar, 1979)
- More of the Night (Capitol, 1990)

With Deniece Williams

- I'm So Proud (Columbia, 1983)
- Let's Hear It for the Boy (Columbia, 1984)
- Hot on the Trail (Columbia, 1986)
- So Glad I Know (Sparrow, 1986)
- As Good as It Gets (Columbia, 1988)
- Special Love (MCA, 1989)

With Lenny Williams

- Sparks of Love (ABC, 1978)
- Love Current (MCA, 1979)
- Let's Do It Today (MCA, 1980)
- Taking Chances (MCA, 1981)

With Michelle Williams

- Do You Know (Columbia Records, 2004)

With Vanessa Williams

- The Comfort Zone (Mercury Records, 1991)

With Bill Withers

- Watching You, Watching Me (Columbia, 1985)

With Bobby Womack

- So Many Rivers (MCA, 1985)

With Stevie Wonder

- A Time to Love (Motown, 2005)

With Stevie Woods

- Take Me to Your Heaven (Cotillion, 1981)
- The Woman in My Life (Cotillion, 1982)
- Attitude (Cotillion, 1983)

With Syreeta Wright

- Syreeta (Tamla, 1980)
- Set My Love in Motion (Tamla, 1981)
- The Spell (Tamla, 1983)

With Paul Young

- The Crossing (Columbia, 1993)
