= Gettin' Away with Murder =

Studio album by Patti Austin
- Released: 1985
- Studios: Bill Schnee Studios (North Hollywood, California); Ocean Way Recording and Sunset Sound (Hollywood, California); Lion Share Studios (Los Angeles, California); Chelsea Studios, Electric Lady Studios, Mediasound Studios, The Power Station, Shakedown Sound Studios and Atlantic Studios (New York City, New York); Creation Audio (Minneapolis, Minnesota)
- Genres: Jazz; Funk; Soul
- Length: 41:01
- Label: Qwest
- Producers: Monte Moir; Tommy LiPuma; Russ Titelman; Jimmy Jam and Terry Lewis

Patti Austin chronology
Patti Austin (1984)	Gettin' Away with Murder (1985)	The Real Me (1988)

Gettin' Away with Murder is a studio album by American jazz singer Patti Austin, released in 1985 on Qwest Records. The album peaked at No. 25 on the US Billboard Top Soul Albums chart and No. 39 on the Billboard Traditional Jazz Albums chart.

== Critical reception ==
Professional ratings
Review scores
Source	Rating
AllMusic	3/5 stars

William Rhulmann of AllMusic declared, "Austin gives her all in any guise they devise for her -- sultry balladeer, disco diva, pop princess."

== Track listing ==
No.	Title	Writer(s)	Length
1.	"Talkin' 'Bout My Baby"	Michael Bolton, Rev. Patrick Henderson	4:19
2.	"Big Bad World"	Lotti Golden, Richard Scher	5:01
3.	"The Heat of Heat"	James Harris III, Terry Lewis	4:49
4.	"If I Believed"	Randy Goodrum	3:28
5.	"Honey for the Bees"	Steve Jolley, Alison Moyet, Tony Swain	4:25
6.	"Gettin' Away With Murder"	Terry Britten, Sue Shifrin	4:05
7.	"Anything Can Happen Here"	Paul Gordon, Tom Keane, Steve Porcaro	4:24
8.	"Only a Breath Away"	Monte Moir	5:13
9.	"Summer Is the Coldest Time of Year"	James Harris III, Terry Lewis	5:17

== Personnel ==
Musicians and Vocals

- Patti Austin – vocals, backing vocals (1–3, 5, 6, 8), doo wop vocals (1)
- Patrick Henderson – acoustic piano (1)
- Robbie Kilgore – keyboards (1, 2, 6), synth bass (1, 4), additional keyboards (4), drum programming (6)
- Jeff Lorber – additional keyboards (1), synth solo (1)
- John Mahoney – Synclavier programming (2, 6)
- Richard Scher – sequenced synthesizer programming (2), drum programming (2)
- Terry Lewis – keyboards (3), drum programming (3), percussion (3, 8, 9)
- Monte Moir – acoustic piano (3, 8), keyboards (3), synthesizers (3, 8), drum programming (8), percussion (8, 9)
- Randy Goodrum – keyboards (4)
- Robbie Buchanan – keyboards (5, 7), synthesizers (5, 7)
- Lee Blaske – Emulator 2 programming (8)
- Herb Pilhofer – Synclavier II (9)
- Todd Yvega – Synclavier programming (9)
- Michael Landau – guitars (1, 4)
- Ira Siegel – lead guitar (1), additional guitars (2), guitars (6)
- Tony Maiden – guitars (2)
- Paul Jackson Jr. – guitars (5, 7)
- Neil Stubenhaus – bass (1)
- Abraham Laboriel – bass (5, 7)
- Steve Ferrone – drums (1, 4, 5, 7)
- Bob Riley – drum programming (1, 2, 6), Simmons toms (2, 6)
- Gordy Knudtson – drums (3, 8)
- Ralph MacDonald – tambourine (1)
- Jimmy Jam – percussion (3, 8, 9), acoustic piano (9), synthesizers (9), drum programming (9)
- Paulinho da Costa – percussion (7)
- Michael Brecker – saxophones (1)
- Randy Brecker – trumpet (1)
- Jeanne Ekholm – harp (3)
- Lani Groves – backing vocals (1, 2, 5)
- Dan Hartman – backing vocals (1)
- Billy Joel – backing vocals (1), doo wop vocals (1)
- Russ Titelman – backing vocals (1), doo wop vocals (1)
- Jocelyn Brown – backing vocals (2)
- Chaka Khan – backing vocals (2)
- Luther Vandross – backing vocals (2)
- Lucia Newell – backing vocals (3, 8)
- Gordon Grody – backing vocals (5)

Strings on "The Heat of Heat"

- Julie Ayer, Helen Foli, Sachina Isomura, Frank Lee, Ralph Matson, Brenda Mickens, Karl Nashan and Marcia Peck – string players

Strings on "Sunmer Is the Coldest Time of the Year"

- Edouard Blitz, Bob Jamieson, Joshua Koestenbaum and Marcia Peck – cello
- Bruce Allard, Julie Ayer, Carolyn Daws, Hanley Daws, Helen Foli, Ralph Matson, Karl Nashan and Hyacinthe Tlucek – violin

Arrangements

- Billy Joel – doo wop arrangements (1)
- Russ Titelman – doo wop arrangements (1)
- Robbie Kilgore – additional synthesizer arrangements (2)
- Richard Scher – basic track arrangements (2)
- Luther Vandross – BGV arrangements (2)
- Patti Austin – vocal arrangements (3, 8), BGV arrangements (6)
- Jimmy Jam – rhythm arrangements (3, 8), vocal arrangements (3, 8)
- Terry Lewis – rhythm arrangements (3, 8), vocal arrangements (3, 8)
- Monte Moir – rhythm arrangements (3, 8), vocal arrangements (3, 8)
- Lee Blaske – string arrangements (3)
- Bob James – string arrangements (4)
- David Nadien – string contractor (4)
- Robbie Buchanan – music arrangements (5, 7)

== Production ==
- Michael Ostin – executive producer
- Russ Titelman – executive producer, producer (1, 2, 4, 6)
- Jimmy Jam and Terry Lewis – producers (3, 9)
- Tommy LiPuma – producer (5, 7)
- Monte Moir – producer (8)
- Kyle Davis – production coordinator (1, 2, 4, 6)
- L.A. Fishman – production coordinator (5, 7)
- Laura LiPuma – art direction, design
- Stuart Watson – front cover photography
- Phyllis Cuington – back cover photography
- Otis – cover cat
- Weisner-DeMann Entertainment – management

Technical credits

- Ted Jensen – mastering at Sterling Sound (New York City, New York)
- Humberto Gatica – basic track recording (1, 4)
- Malcolm Pollack – mixing (1, 6)
- Steve Wiese – recording (3, 8, 9)
- Jack Joseph Puig – recording (5, 7), mixing (5, 7)
- Jim Boyer – additional recording (1, 4), recording (2, 6), mixing (2, 4)
- Bradshaw Leigh – additional recording (1, 2, 4, 6), string recording (4)
- Andy Hoffman – additional recording (1, 2, 4, 6)
- Alan Meyerson – additional recording (2)
- Josh Abbey – additional recording (5, 7)
- Erik Zobler – additional recording (7)
- Bruce Buchalter – assistant engineer (1, 4, 6)
- Elisa Gura – assistant engineer (1, 2, 4, 6)
- Tom Souce – assistant engineer (1, 4)
- Jon Goldberger – mix assistant (1), assistant engineer (6)
- Gail King – assistant engineer (2)
- Bobby Warner – mix assistant (2, 4)
- Bruce Smith – assistant engineer (4)
- Dan Nash – mix assistant (4)
- Dan Garcia – second engineer (5, 7)
- Steve MacMillan – second engineer (5, 7), mix assistant (7)
- Garry Rindfuss – second engineer (5, 7)
- Michael C. Ross – second engineer (5, 7)
- Jamie Chalef – assistant engineer (6)
