= Avant Gershwin =

Studio album by Patti Austin
- Released: March 6, 2007
- Recorded: March 31-August 26, 2006
- Studio: Kölner Philharmonie (Köln, Germany); Westfalenpark (Dortmund, Germany); G Studio Digital (Los Angeles, California, USA)
- Genre: Jazz
- Length: 1:03:54
- Label: Rendezvous Music
- Producer: Patti Austin; Mike Abene; Lucas Schmid

Patti Austin chronology
| Papillon (2003) | Avant Gershwin (2007) | Sound Advice (2011) |

Avant Gershwin is a studio album by Patti Austin, released in 2007 on Rendezvous Music. The album peaked at No. 5 on the US Billboard Traditional Jazz Albums chart and No. 8 on Billboard Top Jazz Albums chart.

== Critical reception ==
Professional ratings
Review scores
| Source | Rating |
|---|---|
| Los Angeles Daily News | 3/5 stars |
| Allmusic | 3.5/5 stars |
| Los Angeles Times | 3.5/4 stars |
| Boston Herald | (B+) |
| USA Today | 4/5 stars |
| Philadelphia Daily News | (A) |

Jonathan Takiff of the Philadelphia Daily News, in an A review found "The songs are classics, the treatments fresh and dynamic, as done up by this rejuvenated singer and Germany's extraordinary WDR Big Band in a sizzling concert recording."

Steven Rosenberg of the Los Angeles Daily News, in a 3/5-star review wrote, "Don't let the Avant in the title fool (or tempt) you -- Austin delivers bread-and-butter George and Ira in this live set with the WDR Big Band that, if anything, is stylized and sophisticated yet incredibly heartfelt and bluesy."

Nate Dow of the Boston Herald, in a B+ review commented, "Teaming with the WDR Big Band at a two-night stand in Germany, Austin swings through this reimagined songbook as if she's been doing it onstage her whole career."

Jonathan Widran of AllMusic, in a 3.5/5-star review remarked, "Avant Gershwin, Patti Austin's shimmering hour-plus tour de force through both familiar and obscure -- but always intriguing -- selections from the catalog of George & Ira Gershwin, is, for the record, not the first time she's dazzled with their songs...Avant Gershwin is in many ways an extension of the Fitzgerald tribute; both find her performing with the vibrant, brassy and swinging backing of the WDR Big Band."

Daryl H. Miller of the Los Angeles Times in a 3.5/4-star review declared, "Recording-studio pristine -- though it was largely recorded live with the WDR Big Band of Cologne, Germany -- the album, arranged and conducted by Michael Abene, luxuriates in eight single-song excursions and medleys, most lasting six minutes or more...As Patti Austin filigrees her smooth, trumpet-like vocals onto these big-band arrangements of George and Ira Gershwin classics, she becomes the lead instrument in a lush, lively sound."

Steve Jones of USA Today, in a 4/5 star review noted, "there is nothing standard about the dynamic Patti Austin or her clever takes on these beloved Gershwin works. With the help of Michael Abene and the WDR Big Band, Austin musically rearranges and lyrically reframes these classic tunes, which sparkle thanks to the fresh ideas."

== Accolades ==
Avant Gershwin won a Grammy Award in the category of Best Jazz Vocal Album.

== Track listing ==
| No. | Title | Writer(s) | Length |
|---|---|---|---|
| 1. | "Overture/Gershwin Medley" | George Gershwin, Ira Gershwin | 12:19 |
| 2. | "I'll Build A Stairway To Paradise" | B.G. Desylva, George Gershwin, Ira Gershwin | 6:14 |
| 3. | "Who Cares" | George Gershwin, Ira Gershwin | 6:34 |
| 4. | "Funny Face" | George Gershwin, Ira Gershwin | 4:02 |
| 5. | "Love Walked In/Love Is Sweeping The Country" | George Gershwin, Ira Gershwin | 5:35 |
| 6. | "Swanee" | George Gershwin, Irving Caesar | 5:13 |
| 7. | "Porgy And Bess Medley" | George Gershwin, Ira Gershwin | 17:08 |
| 8. | "Lady Be Good" | George Gershwin, Ira Gershwin | 6:52 |

== Credits ==
=== Personnel ===
- Patti Austin – vocals
- Mike Abene – arrangements and conductor
- WDR Big Band – instruments

=== Production ===
- Frank Cody – executive producer
- Dave Koz – executive producer
- Hyman Katz – executive producer
- Patti Austin – producer
- Mike Abene – producer
- Lucas M. Schmid – producer
- Dirk Franken – engineer
- Sebastian Roth – engineer
- Christian Schmitt – engineer
- Dominik Glass – sound technician
- Ruth Witt – sound technician
- Don Murray – mixing
- Doug Sax – mastering
- Sangwook Nam – mastering
- The Mastering Lab (Hollywood, California) – mastering location
- Carol Friedman – art direction, photography
- Dominick Media – design
- Tanya Stone – hair
- Rudy Calvo – make-up
- Cecile Parker – stylist
- Robert Ellis – gown
