= Love Is Gonna Getcha =

Studio album by Patti Austin
- Released: March 1990
- Studio: Sunset Sound Studios (Hollywood, California; American Recording Co. (Calabasas, California); Smoketree Ranch (Chatsworth, California); Clinton Recording Studio and The Power Station (New York City, New York)
- Genre: Smooth jazz
- Length: 54:35
- Label: GRP
- Producer: Dave Grusin; David Paich

Patti Austin chronology
The Real Me (1988)	Love Is Gonna Getcha (1990)	Carry On (1991)

Love Is Gonna Getcha is the eighth studio album by American singer Patti Austin, released in 1990 on GRP Records. The album reached No. 4 on the US Billboard Top Contemporary Jazz Albums chart and No. 45 on the US Billboard Top Soul Albums chart.

== Critical reception ==
Professional ratings
Review scores
Source	Rating
Allmusic	3/5 stars

Jonathan Widran of Allmusic, in a 3/5 star review remarked, "With apologies to Dianne Reeves, Patti Austin has always quite simply been the best jack-of-all-genre singers on the planet, crossing effortlessly from jazz to pop and R&B with a voice that's so sweet, rich, and lovely, it can't help but warm the heart. On the heels of her 1988 masterpiece The Real Me, her GRP debut packs a wallop of festive up tempo tunes, lite funk pop, torchy message songs, passionate ballads, and breezy tenderness -- all delivered with a truly Austin-tatious flair."

== Track listing ==
1. "Through the Test of Time" (David Pack, Jeff Pescetto) – 5:05
2. "Too Soon to Know" (David Pack, Lorraine Feather, Michael McDonald) – 4:21
3. "In My Life" (Patti Austin) – 4:02
4. "Love Is Gonna Getcha" (Lou Pardini, Reed Vertelney, Alan Roy) – 4:59
5. "Ooh-Whee (The Carnival)" (Don Grusin, Patti Austin) – 5:40
6. "Believe the Children" (Abraham Laboriel, Lynn Laboriel, Lou Pardini) – 5:34
7. "Good in Love" (Jeff Southworth, Fran Eckert, Robin Batteau) – 4:37
8. "Wait for Me" (Don Grusin, Kate Markowitz, Christina Trulio) – 5:25
9. "First Time Love" (Dave Grusin, Harvey Mason) – 5:30
10. "In My Dream" (Edward Arkin, Beckie Foster) – 5:07
11. "The Girl Who Used to Be Me" (theme from "Shirley Valentine") (Marvin Hamlisch, Alan Bergman, Marilyn Bergman) – 4:15

== Personnel ==
Musicians and vocalists

- Patti Austin – lead vocals, backing vocals (2, 5, 7, 8, 10)
- Dave Grusin – synthesizers (1, 3, 4, 6, 9), keyboards (2, 5, 7, 8, 10), acoustic piano (3, 9), harmonica (8)
- Greg Phillinganes – acoustic piano (1, 4, 6)
- David Paich – keyboards (11), synthesizers (11)
- Steve Porcaro – synthesizers (11)
- Lee Ritenour – guitars (1, 2, 4, 5, 7–9)
- Michael Landau – guitars (11)
- Nathan East – bass (1, 3, 4, 6, 8–10)
- Neil Stubenhaus – bass (2, 5, 7)
- Harvey Mason – drums (1–10)
- Jeff Porcaro – drums (11)
- Michael Fisher – percussion (3, 5, 6, 10)
- Paulinho da Costa – percussion (8)
- Lenny Castro – percussion (11)
- Ernie Watts – tenor saxophone (1)
- Nelson Rangell – alto saxophone (4)
- Robin Beck – backing vocals (1, 4, 6, 7)
- Shelton Becton – backing vocals (1, 6)
- Jocelyn Brown – backing vocals (1, 4, 6, 7)
- Rachele Cappelli – backing vocals (1, 4, 6, 7)
- William Eaton – backing vocals (1, 6)
- Lani Groves – backing vocals (1, 2, 4, 6, 7)
- James D-Train Williams – backing vocals (1, 4, 6)
- Casey Sissik – backing vocals (2, 7)

Music arrangements

- Patti Austin – BGV arrangements (1, 4–8, 10)
- Dave Grusin – rhythm arrangements (1–10), BGV arrangements (5, 6, 8, 10)
- David Pack – BGV arrangements (2)
- David Paich – arrangements (11)

Strings (tracks 3, 9 & 10)

- Dave Grusin – string arrangements
- David Nadien – concertmaster
- Charles McCracken and Richard Locker – cello
- Deborah Henson-Conant – harp
- Jean R. Dane, Carol Landon and Sue Pray – viola
- Elena Barere, Arnold Eidus, Barry Finclair, Regis Iandiorio, Charles Libove, Louann Montesi, David Nadien, John Pintavalle, Matthew Raimondi, Richard Sortomme, Marti Sweet and Gerald Tarack – violin

== Production ==
- Larry Rosen – executive producer
- Dave Grusin – executive producer, producer (1–10)
- David Paich – producer (11)
- Don Murray – recording, mixing
- Brian Soucy – recording assistant
- Elaine Anderson – mix assistant
- Bill Cooper – additional recording
- Ed Rak – additional recording
- Matthew "Boomer" LaMonica – additional recording assistant
- Joe Martin – additional recording assistant
- Michael Landy – digital editing at The Review Room (New York City, New York)
- Robert Vosgien – digital editing at CMS Digital (Pasadena, California)
- Wally Traugott – mastering at Capitol Studios (Hollywood, California)
- Suzanne Sherman – GRP production coordinator
- Barbara Hein – production assistant
- Andy Baltimore – GRP creative director
- David Gibb – graphic design
- Jacki McCarthy – graphic design
- Andy Ruggirello – graphic design
- Dan Serrano – graphic design
- Richard Corman – photography
- Tokyo – hair, stylist
- Craig Gadson – make-up stylist

== Charts ==
Chart (1990)	Peak position
US Billboard Top Contemporary Jazz Albums	4
US Billboard Top Soul Albums	45
US Billboard 200	93
