= Havana Candy =

Studio album by Patti Austin
- Released: October 26, 1977
- Recorded: August 1977
- Studio: Electric Lady Studios (New York City, New York)
- Genre: R&B
- Length: 32:38
- Label: CTI; CTI 5006
- Producer: Dave Grusin: Larry Rosen

Patti Austin chronology
End of a Rainbow (1976)	Havana Candy (1977)	Live at the Bottom Line (1979)

Havana Candy is the second album by American vocalist and songwriter Patti Austin recorded in 1977 and released on the CTI label.

== Reception ==
The Allmusic review stated "Austin sang this undistinguished material with as much conviction as she could muster, but the general pallid air lingering over the production also affected her vocals".

Professional ratings
Review scores
Source	Rating
Allmusic	2/5 stars

== Track listing ==
All compositions by Patti Austin except as indicated

1. "That's Enough for Me" (Patti Austin, Dave Grusin) – 5:46
2. "Little Baby" – 4:12
3. "I Just Want to Know" – 4:54
4. "Havana Candy" – 4:34
5. "Golden Oldies" – 4:41
6. "I Need Somebody" – 4:29
7. "We're in Love" – 4:00
8. "Lost in the Stars" (Maxwell Anderson, Kurt Weill) – 5:02

== Personnel ==
- Patti Austin – lead vocals, backing vocals
- Dave Grusin – electric piano, slide whistle (4), synthesizers (6, 8), acoustic piano (8), arrangements and conductor
- Richard Tee – acoustic piano (2, 6, 7)
- Eric Gale – electric guitars (1–7)
- Hugh McCracken – electric guitars (1, 4, 5)
- Steve Khan – electric guitars (1, 5)
- Will Lee – electric bass (1, 4, 5)
- Francisco Centeno – electric bass (2)
- Anthony Jackson – electric bass (3)
- Frank Gravis – electric bass (7)
- Steve Jordan – drums (1–7)
- Ralph MacDonald – percussion (1, 5, 7), congas (4)
- Dave Valentin – flute, timbales (4)
- Gerry Niewood – alto saxophone
- Ronnie Cuber – baritone saxophone
- Lou Marini – tenor saxophone
- Michael Brecker – tenor sax solos (1–4)
- Wayne Andre – trombone
- Alan Rubin – trumpet
- Marvin Stamm – trumpet
- Seymour Barab, Gene Bianco, David Davis, Peter Dimitriades, Regis Iandiorio, Theodore Israel, Jesse Levy, Charles Libove, Guy Lumia, Elliot Magaziner, Joe Malin, Richard Maximoff, Elliot Rosoff and Paul Winter – string section
- Lani Groves, Gwen Guthrie, Ullanda McCullough and Ken Williams – backing vocals

=== Production ===
- Tony Martell – executive producer
- Dave Grusin – producer
- Larry Rosen – producer, recording, mixing
- Michael Frondelli – assistant engineer
- Bob Ludwig – original mastering at Masterdisk (New York, NY)
- Tom Ruff – CD mastering at Sony Music Studios (New York, NY)
- Donna Putney – production coordinator
- Sib Chalawick – album design
- Alen MacWeeney – photography
