= Patti Austin (album) =

Studio album by Patti Austin
- Released: March 5, 1984
- Studios: Ameraycan Studios, Hollywood Sound Recorders, Soundcastle, Sunset Sound and Ocean Way Recording (Hollywood, California); Weddington Studios (North Hollywood, California); The Complex (Los Angeles, California); Channel Recording (Burbank, California); The Automatt (San Francisco, California)
- Genres: Jazz; R&B; dance-rock
- Length: 43:31
- Label: Qwest
- Producers: Narada Michael Walden; David Pack; Clif Magness; Glen Ballard; Ollie E. Brown; Quincy Jones

Patti Austin chronology
In My Life (1983)	Patti Austin (1984)	Gettin' Away with Murder (1985)

Patti Austin is the fifth studio album by American R&B singer Patti Austin, released on March 5, 1984, by Qwest Records. The album was nominated for a Grammy Award in the category of Best R&B Vocal Performance, Female.

== Critical reception ==
Professional ratings
Review scores
Source	Rating
AllMusic	3.5/5 stars

Ron Wynn of AllMusic in a 3.5/5-star review claimed, "It wasn't her best (album) on Qwest, but it was far from her worst."

== Track listing ==
Side one

1. "It's Gonna Be Special" (Clif Magness, Glen Ballard) – 4:17
2. "Rhythm of the Street" (Jeffrey Cohen, Preston Glass, Narada Michael Walden) – 4:00
3. "All Behind Us Now" (David Pack) – 4:59
4. "Hot! In the Flames of Love" (Cohen, Glass, Walden) – 3:59
5. "Change Your Attitude" (Magness, Ballard) – 3:41

Side two

6. "Shoot The Moon" (Ballard, Magness) – 3:35
7. "I've Got My Heart Set on You" (David Bryant, Diane Warren) – 4:12
8. "Fine Fine Fella (Got to Have You)" (Ollie E. Brown, Attala Zane Giles, Phillip Ingram) – 4:34
9. "Starstruck" (Glass, Dwayne Simmons, Walden) – 4:28
10. "Any Way You Can" (Pack, Michael McDonald) – 4:31

== Personnel ==
Credits are adapted from the Patti Austin liner notes.

Musicians

- Patti Austin – lead vocals
- John Van Tongeren – keyboards (1, 6), synthesizers (1), additional keyboards (5), sequencing (6), bass (6)
- Preston Glass – acoustic piano (2, 4)
- David Sancious – keyboards (2, 4, 9), synthesizers (2, 4, 9)
- Greg Phillinganes – keyboards (3)
- David Pack – synthesizers (3), guitars (3), synth solo (10)
- Tommy Faragher – keyboards (5), sequencing (5), bass (5)
- John Barnes – keyboards (7), synthesizers (7)
- Rex Salas – acoustic piano (8), synthesizers (8)
- Victor Feldman – grand piano (10), Fender Rhodes (10)
- Michael McDonald – Fender Rhodes (10)
- Clif Magness – guitars (1, 5, 6), percussion (6)
- Corrado Rustici – guitars (2, 4, 9)
- Paul Jackson Jr. – guitars (5)
- Tommy Organ – guitar solo (5)
- Zane Giles – guitars (8)
- Josef Parson – guitars (8)
- Randy Jackson – bass (2, 4, 9), Pro One bass (2), Simmons drums (2)
- Nathan East – bass (3)
- Cornelius Mims – bass (7, 8)
- Chuck Domanico – bass (10)
- Narada Michael Walden – drums (2, 4, 9), percussion (4), OB-Xa bass (9), Simmons drums (9)
- John Robinson – drums (3, 10)
- Ollie E. Brown – drums (7, 8), Simmons drums (7), percussion (7, 8), special effects (8)
- Frank Martin – DMX sequencing (9)
- Paulinho da Costa – percussion (1, 3)
- Armando Peraza – cuíca (2)
- Raul Rekow – congas (2)
- Orestes Vilato – cowbell (2), timbales (2)
- Steve Forman – percussion (6)
- Kim Hutchcroft – tenor saxophone (1)
- Larry Williams – alto saxophone (1), synthesizers (8)
- Ernie Watts – tenor saxophone (3)
- Marc Russo – saxophones (4)
- Bill Reichenbach Jr. – trombone (7)
- Gary Grant – trumpet (1, 7)
- Jerry Hey – trumpet (1, 7), flugelhorn (10)

Music arrangements

- Glen Ballard – rhythm arrangements (1), arrangements (5, 6)
- Jerry Hey – horn arrangements (1, 3, 7), additional keyboard arrangements (5), synthesizer arrangements (8)
- Clif Magness – rhythm arrangements (1), arrangements (5, 6)
- David Pack – keyboard and rhythm arrangements (3)
- Greg Phillinganes – keyboard arrangements (3)
- Marty Paich – string arrangements and conductor (3, 10)
- Ollie E. Brown – rhythm and BGV arrangements (7, 8), synthesizer arrangements (8)
- Phillip Ingram – BGV arrangements (7, 8)
- Zane Giles – BGV arrangements (8)
- Victor Feldman – piano arrangements (10)

Background vocals

- Patti Austin – backing vocals (1, 3, 5, 6)
- Angela Bofill – backing vocals (2, 4, 9)
- Jim Gilstrap – backing vocals (2, 4, 9)
- Preston Glass – backing vocals (2, 4, 9)
- Myrna Matthews – backing vocals (2, 4, 9)
- Sheree Brown – backing vocals (7, 8)
- Zane Giles – backing vocals (7, 8)
- Phillip Ingram – backing vocals (7, 8)
- Josie James – backing vocals (7)
- Kevin T. Jones – backing vocals (7)
- Paulette McWilliams – backing vocals (7, 8)
- Siedah Garrett – backing vocals (8)
- Randy Jackson – additional backing vocals (9)
- Corrado Rustici – additional backing vocals (9)
- David Sancious – additional backing vocals (9)

== Production ==
- Ed Eckstine – executive producer
- Quincy Jones – executive producer, producer (1)
- Narada Michael Walden – producer (2, 4, 9)
- David Pack – producer (3, 10)
- Clif Magness – producer (5)
- Glen Ballard – producer (5, 6)
- Ollie E. Brown – producer (7, 8)
- Jeri McManus – design
- Mark Larsen – design
- Dennis Keeley – hand tinting
- Gary Heery – photography
- David Schewe – hair stylist
- K. Gelbord – make-up
- Weisner-DeMann Entertainment – management

Technical credits

- Steve Hall – original mastering at Future Disc (North Hollywood, California)
- Greg Calbi – remastering at Sterling Sound (New York City, New York)
- Quincy Jones – album sequencing
- Ed Eckstine – editing, album sequencing
- Clif Magness – editing
- Tommy Vicari – recording (1), mixing (1)
- David Frazer – recording (2, 4, 9)
- Tom Perry – rhythm track recording (3)
- Michael Verdick – overdub and vocal recording (3, 10), mixing (3, 10), string recording (10)
- Ian Eales – recording (5, 6), mixing (5, 6), editing, additional technical supervision
- Steve Halquist – recording (7, 8), mixing (7, 8)
- Ollie E. Brown – mixing (7, 8)
- Al Schmitt – rhythm track recording (10)
- Mitch Gibson – assistant engineer (1, 5, 6)
- Barbara Rooney – assistant engineer (1)
- John Nowland – assistant engineer (2, 4, 9)
- Paul Erickson – assistant engineer (5, 6)
- Mike Ross – assistant engineer (5, 6)
- David Marquette – assistant engineer (6)
