= For Ella =

Studio album by Patti Austin
- Released: May 21, 2002
- Recorded: June 19-28, 2001
- Studio: WDR Studio and Köhlner Philharmonie (Cologne, Germany); Capitol Studios (Hollywood, California, USA); G Studio Digital (Malibu, California, USA)
- Genre: Jazz
- Length: 46:07
- Label: Playboy Jazz/Concord
- Producer: Gregg Field; Patrick Williams; Wolfgang Hirschmann

Patti Austin chronology
On the Way to Love (2001)	For Ella (2002)	Papillon (2003)

For Ella is a studio album by Patti Austin, released in 2002 on Playboy Jazz/Concord Records. The album peaked at No. 7 on the US Billboard Traditional Jazz Albums chart and No. 18 on the Billboard Top Jazz Albums chart.

== Critical reception ==
Professional ratings
Review scores
Source	Rating
AllMusic	4/5 stars
Miami Herald	3/5 stars
USA Today	3/4 stars
Atlanta Journal Constitution	(A−)

Steve Jones of USA Today hailed the album saying, "Austin dares and succeeds on this loving tribute...Record(ed) in Koln, Germany, under the baton of Grammy-winning arranger Patrick Williams, Austin revels in the material, showing off a talent for jazz only hinted at in her more popular work. Ella is in great hands here." William Ruhlmann of AllMusic, in a 4/5 star review, declared, "Patti Austin is well qualified to record an album in the style of Ella Fitzgerald, having spent her career shadowing the paths taken by Fitzgerald and her contemporaries...Austin does not, for the most part, attempt to sing in Fitzgerald's style, giving listeners her own interpretations that, in Williams' neo-swing arrangements, nevertheless hark back to the 1950s...Austin is better off putting her own stamp on the songs; that she does very well."

Howard Cohen of the Miami Herald in a 3/5 star review claimed, "Austin goes so far as to painstakingly recreate Fitzgerald's exact vocal patterns on You'll Have to Swing It (Mr. Paganini) and How High the Moon. It's a daring move that would hang lesser singers but it's one also fraught with danger for comparisons to Ella will always favor the legend...Certainly not a substitution for Ella but it's worth having as an addition to your jazz library." Mario Tarradell of the Dallas Morning News remarked, "The song stylist revisits her jazz roots on this passionate homage to the late great Ella Fitzgerald. Singing with Patrick Williams and the WDR Big Band - Mr. Williams' arrangements were written around Ms. Fitzgerald's original vocal improvisations - Ms. Austin never misses a beat."

Sonia Murray of the Atlanta Journal Constitution, in an A− review commented, ""Absolutely beautiful" only begins to describe what happens when Patti Austin tries on the jewels of American treasure Ella Fitzgerald." Clive Davis of The Times with praise wrote, "Instead of opting for a pop makeover, Austin sides with tradition, luxuriating in a sound that evokes the era of Fitzgerald's songbook albums without indulging in note-for-note copies." Al Hunter Jr. of the Philadelphia Daily News noted, "Austin is in superb voice and carries Ella's spirit and songs supported by the fine WDR Big Band...One of the most satisfying discs this year."

== Accolades ==
For Ella was nominated for a Grammy Award in the category of Best Jazz Vocal Album.

== Track listing ==
No.	Title	Writer(s)	Length
1.	"Too Close for Comfort"	George Weiss, Jerry Bock, Larry Holofcener	3:56
2.	"Honeysuckle Rose"	Andy Razaf, Thomas Waller	4:13
3.	"You'll Have to Swing It (Mr. Paganini)"	Sam Coslow	4:22
4.	"Our Love is Here to Stay"	George Gershwin, Ira Gershwin	5:28
5.	"A Tisket a Tasket"	Ella Fitzgerald, Van Alexander	2:49
6.	"Miss Otis Regrets"	Cole Porter	4:00
7.	"Hard Hearted Hannah, (The Vamp of Savannah)"	Charles Bates, Jack Yellen, Milton Ager, Robert Wilcox Bigelow	3:28
8.	"But Not for Me"	George Gershwin, Ira Gershwin	3:53
9.	"Satin Doll"	Billy Strayhorn, Edward Kennedy Ellington, John H Mercer	2:52
10.	"The Man I Love"	George Gershwin, Ira Gershwin	3:29
11.	"Hearing Ella Sing"	Arthur Hamilton, Patrick Williams	2:53
12.	"How High the Moon"	William M Lewis Jr., Nancy Hamilton	4:31

== Personnel ==
- Patti Austin – vocals
- Patrick Williams – arrangements and conductor
- Terry Woodson Music – music preparation
- Claudius Krause – music librarian

=== WDR Big Band ===
Rhythm section

- Frank Chastenier – grand piano
- Paul Shigihara – guitars
- John Goldsby – bass
- Gregg Field – drums

Horn section

- Jens Neufeng, Olivier Peters, Rolf Römer, Harald Rosenstein and Heiner Wiberny – saxophones
- Lucas Schmid – bass trombone
- David Horler, Bernt Laukamp and Ludwig Nuss – trombone
- Andy Haderer – lead trumpet
- Rob Bruynen, Rick Kiefer, John Marshall and Klaus Osterloh – trumpet

=== WDR String Ensemble Köln ===
- Albert Jung – contractor
- Mischa Salevic – concertmaster
- Tillman Fischer, George Heimbach, Albert Jung and Ulrike Schäfer – cello
- Stephan Blaumer, Wilfried Engel, Bernhard Oll, Katja Püschel and Kai Strowasser – viola
- Manuela Belchior, Ursula Maria Berg, Adrian Bleyer, Koenraad Ellegiers, Colin Harrison, Johannes Oppelcz, Dirk Otte, Ingmar Püschel, Mischa Salevic, Christoph Seybold, Chizuko Takahashi, Sonja Wiedebusch and Chiharu Yuki – violin

== Production ==
- Glen Barros – executive producer
- John Burk – executive producer
- Patrick Williams – producer
- Gregg Field – producer, additional mixing
- Wolfgang Hirschmann – producer, recording
- Reinhold Nickel – recording assistant
- Ruth Witt – recording assistant
- Don Murray – additional recording
- Seth Presant – additional recording, additional mixing
- Michaela Höck – additional live recording assistant
- Thomas Schringer – additional live recording assistant
- Al Schmitt – mixing
- Wil Donovan – additional mix assistant
- Steve Genewick – additional mix assistant
- John Hendrickson – additional mix assistant
- Norbert Ommer – live sound reinforcement
- Robert Hadley – mastering
- Doug Sax – mastering
- The Mastering Lab (Hollywood, California, USA) – mastering location
- Valerie Whitesell – production manager
- Annette Hauber – coordinator for WDR
- Lisa Vasey – assistant to Patrick Williams
- Jürgen Winter – stage manager
- Abbey Anna – art direction
- Andrea R. Nelson – art direction, design
- Carol Friedman – cover photography
