= Patti Austin =

American R&B, pop, and jazz singer (born 1950)

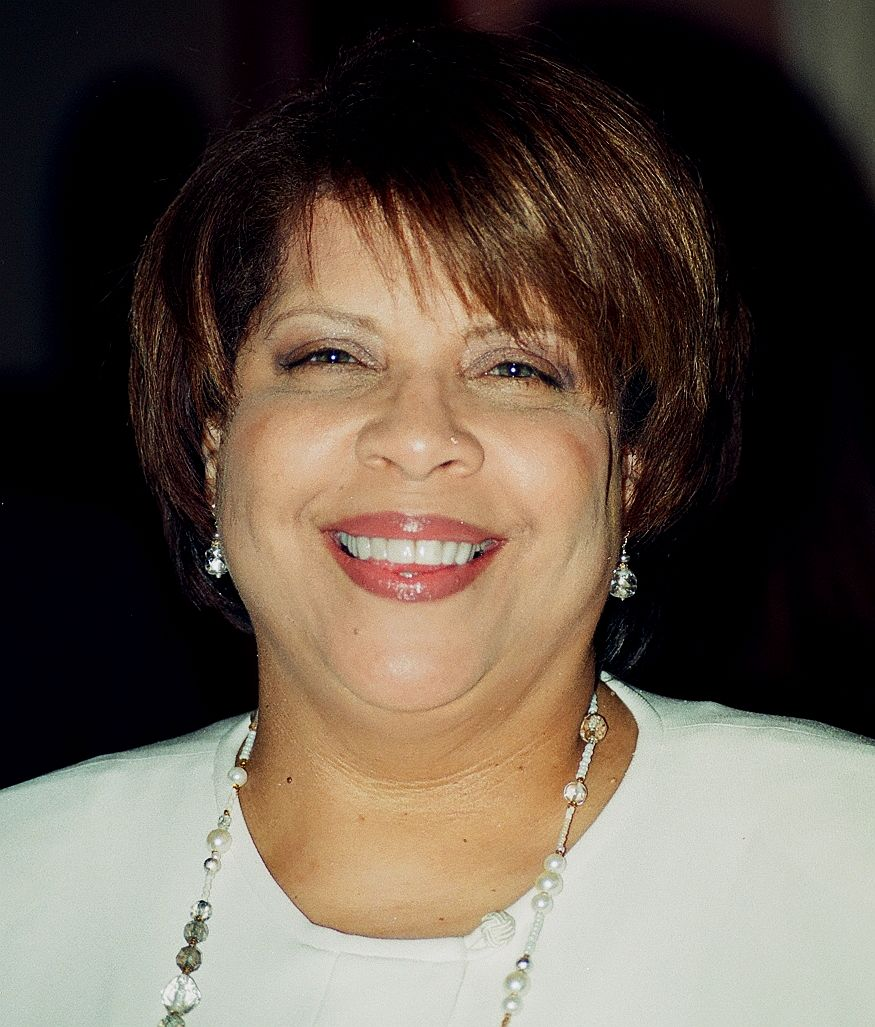
- Austin in 2000

Background information
- Born: August 10, 1950 (age 76); Harlem, New York, U.S.
- Genres: R&B, pop, jazz
- Occupations: Singer, songwriter
- Years active: 1954–present
- Labels: CTI; Qwest; GRP; Shanachie

Patti Austin (born August 10, 1950) is an American R&B, pop, and jazz singer and songwriter. Austin has collaborated with the likes of James Ingram, Steely Dan and Quincy Jones. She received an honorary doctorate from the Berklee College of Music. Austin has also won one Grammy out of seven nominations.

== Music career ==
Austin was born in Harlem, New York, to Gordon Austin, a jazz trombonist. She was raised in Bay Shore, New York on Long Island. Quincy Jones and Dinah Washington referred to themselves as her godparents. Her father was black and her mother's parents were from Barbados and Sweden.

When Austin was four years old, she performed at the Apollo Theater. As a teenager she recorded commercial jingles and worked as a session singer in soul and R&B. She had an R&B hit in 1969 with "Family Tree". She sang backing vocals on Paul Simon's 1975 number-one hit "50 Ways to Leave Your Lover" and had prominent parts on Frankie Valli's hit solo records "Swearin' to God" and "Our Day Will Come." The jazz label CTI released her debut album, End of a Rainbow, in 1976. She sang backing vocals on the track "Everybody has a Dream" for Billy Joel's hit album The Stranger (album) in 1977. She sang "The Closer I Get to You" for Tom Browne's album Browne Sugar, a duet with Michael Jackson for his album Off the Wall, and a duet with George Benson on "Moody's Mood for Love".

After singing on Quincy Jones's album The Dude, she signed a contract with his record label, Qwest, which released Every Home Should Have One with "Baby, Come to Me", a duet with James Ingram that became a No. 1 hit on the Billboard magazine pop chart. A second duet with Ingram, "How Do You Keep the Music Playing", appeared on soundtrack to the film Best Friends (1982). Her final album for Qwest, The Real Me contained versions of jazz standards. Austin moved on to GRP for four releases, including Love Is Gonna Getcha, which contained the singles "Good in Love" and "Through the Test of Time".

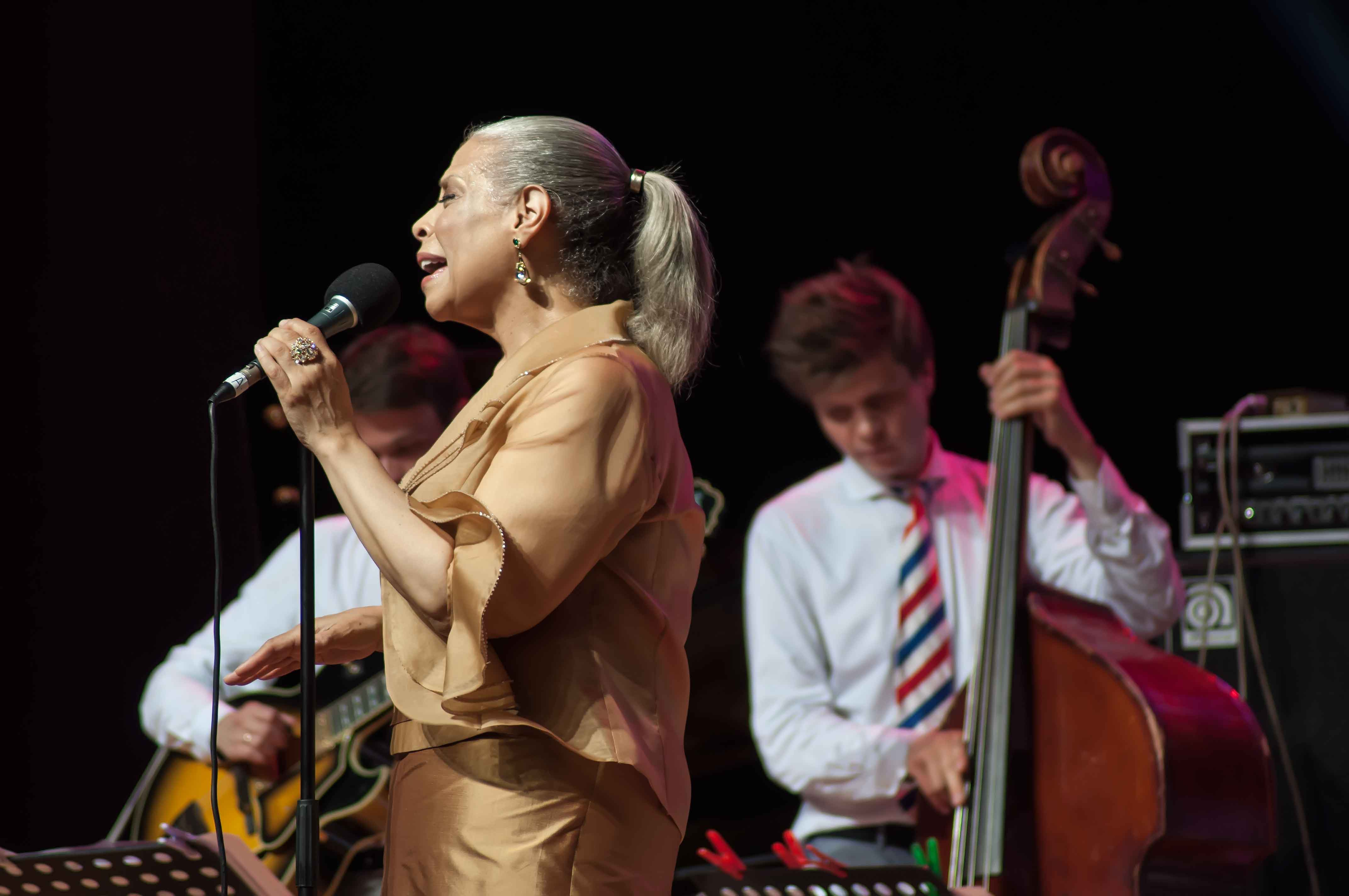
Austin sings with the Moscow Jazz Orchestra at the Sochi Jazz Festival in Russia in August 2017

Austin was booked for United Flight 93 on September 11, 2001, but because her mother suffered a stroke days before, she cancelled her ticket and flew at a different time.

In 2003, she collaborated with Frances Yip on Papillon III in the rotunda of San Francisco City Hall to help Stanford University's Jade Ribbon Campaign. A companion CD/DVD was released with Austin and Yip singing duets in Mandarin.

A performance in 2000 with the Germany-based WDR Big Band led to later recordings with the Germany-based ensemble that yielded two of Austin's six Grammy nominations: For Ella (2002) was a tribute to Ella Fitzgerald. A 2007 release with the band and arranger Michael Abene, Avant Gershwin, earned her the trophy for Best Jazz Vocal Performance.

During a 2007 interview, Austin spoke of reluctantly attending as a teenager one of Judy Garland's last concerts and how the experience helped focus her career. "She ripped my heart out. I wanted to interpret a lyric like that, to present who I was at the moment through the lyric."

In 2011, Sound Advice was released containing cover versions of Bob Dylan's "Gotta Serve Somebody", Brenda Russell's "A Little Bit of Love", the Jackson Five's "Give It Up", Bill Withers' "Lean on Me", and Don McLean's "Vincent". The album also included "The Grace of God", a song Austin wrote after watching an episode of the Oprah Winfrey Show which included a woman with scarred face. Austin appeared in the Oscar-winning documentary film 20 Feet from Stardom, which premiered at the Sundance Film Festival and was released on June 21, 2013.

In 2015, Austin appeared on Patrick Williams' Home Suite Home large jazz ensemble album, as vocalist for Williams' composition "52nd & Broadway," which won a Grammy for Best Arrangement, Instruments and Vocals.

== Awards and honors ==
=== Grammy Awards ===
The Grammy Awards are awarded annually by the National Academy of Recording Arts and Sciences. Austin has received one award out of seven nominations.

Year	Category	Nominated work	Result
1982	Best Female R&B Vocal Performance	"Razzamatazz (Track)"	Nominated
1984	Best Pop Performance By A Duo Or Group With Vocal	How Do You Keep The Music Playing (Single)	Nominated
1985	Best R&B Vocal Performance, Female	"Patti Austin"	Nominated
1995	Best Instrumental Arrangement With Accompanying Vocal(s)	"Ability To Swing (Track)"	Nominated
2003	Best Jazz Vocal Album	For Ella	Nominated
2008	Best Jazz Vocal Album	Avant Gershwin	Won
2024	Best Jazz Vocal Album	For Ella 2	Nominated

=== Accolades ===
- Honorary doctorate, Berklee College of Music

== Discography ==
- End of a Rainbow (1976)
- Havana Candy (1977)
- Body Language (1980)
- Every Home Should Have One (1981)
- Patti Austin (1984)
- Gettin' Away with Murder (1985)
- The Real Me (1988)
- Love Is Gonna Getcha (1990)
- Carry On (1991)
- That Secret Place (1994)
- In & Out Of Love (1998)
- Street Of Dreams (1999)
- On the Way to Love (2001)
- For Ella (2002)
- Avant Gershwin (2007)
- Sound Advice (2011)

== Filmography ==
Year	Film	Role	Ref.
1978	The Wiz	The Wiz Singers Children's Choir / The Wiz Singers Adult Choir (voice)	
1988	Tucker: The Man and His Dream	Millie	
2013	20 Feet from Stardom	Herself	

== See also ==
- List of artists who reached number one in the United States
- List of artists who reached number one on the U.S. Dance Club Songs chart
