= The Kids & Me =

Studio album by Billy Preston
- Released: May 3, 1974
- Recorded: October 1973
- Studio: Record Plant (Los Angeles); Westlake Audio (Hollywood); A&M (Hollywood)
- Genre: Soul, funk, rock
- Length: 32:48
- Label: A&M
- Producer: Billy Preston

Billy Preston chronology
Live European Tour 1973 (1974)	The Kids & Me (1974)	It's My Pleasure (1975)

Professional ratings
Review scores
Source	Rating
AllMusic	2/5 stars
Christgau's Record Guide	B−

The Kids & Me is the ninth studio album by Billy Preston, released in 1974, after his famous tour in Europe. This album included "You Are So Beautiful", later covered by Joe Cocker, and the hit single "Nothing from Nothing".

The album's dedication, reflected in the title, was to St. Elmo's Village, an inner-city children's recreation centre, located in mid-city Los Angeles.

== Track listing ==
Side one
No.	Title	Writer(s)	Length
1.	"Tell Me You Need My Loving"	Billy Preston; Bruce Fisher	2:42
2.	"Nothing from Nothing"	Preston; Fisher	2:33
3.	"Struttin'"	Preston; George Johnson; Louis Johnson	2:31
4.	"Sister Sugar"	Preston; Fisher	3:01
5.	"Sad Sad Song"	Preston; Fisher	2:27
6.	"You Are So Beautiful"	Preston; Fisher	4:44

Side two
No.	Title	Writer(s)	Length
1.	"Sometimes I Love You"	Preston	3:12
2.	"St. Elmo"	Preston	2:26
3.	"John the Baptist"	Preston; John Schuler	3:19
4.	"Little Black Boys and Girls"	Preston; Fisher	2:28
5.	"Creature Feature"	Preston; Hubert Heard	3:27

== Personnel ==
- Billy Preston - keyboards, piano, vocals
- Tony Maiden, Joe Walsh - guitar
- Bobby Watson - bass guitar
- Al Perkins - banjo
- Kenneth Luper, Hubert Heard - keyboards
- Manuel Kellough - drums
