= Channing Ward =

American football player (born 1992)

No. 71, 95
- Position: Defensive tackle

Personal information
- Born: September 17, 1992 (age 34); Aberdeen, Mississippi, U.S.
- Listed height: 6 ft 4 in (1.93 m)
- Listed weight: 310 lb (141 kg)

Career information
- High school: Aberdeen
- College: Mississippi
- NFL draft: 2016: undrafted

Career history
- Tampa Bay Buccaneers (2016–2018); St. Louis BattleHawks (2020)

Career NFL statistics
- Total tackles: 5
- Stats at Pro Football Reference

Channing Jevante Ward (born September 17, 1992) is an American former professional football player who was a defensive tackle in the National Football League (NFL). He played college football for the Ole Miss Rebels. Ward coached the defensive line at New Albany High School in New Albany, Mississippi but he now coaches at St. Andrew’s Episcopal School in Ridgeland (Mississippi).

== Early life ==
He was born in 1992 in Aberdeen, Mississippi to parents Bob Evans and Cora Ward. He played football at Aberdeen High as a defensive end. Ward's high school career included numerous awards and recognition. Among his distinctions Ward was listed No. 2 on The Clarion-Ledger's Top Ten Most Wanted List. The Ledger also awarded him first-team All-State honors during his junior and senior years.

== College career ==
Ward committed to the University of Mississippi and first played in 2012. As a defensive end on special teams, Ward played every game during the 2012 and 2013 seasons and played as a backup defensive end on special teams during the 2014 season. After the 2015 season, Ward finished with 4 game starts and career highs of 35 tackles, 6.5 tackles, 3.0 sacks and 3 passes defended. While at Mississippi, Ward majored in Criminal Justice

== Professional career ==
Ward signed with the Buccaneers as an undrafted free agent in 2016. He made the Buccaneers' initial 53-man roster, playing in five games with one start over nine weeks and recording five tackles before being released on November 16, 2016. He was re-signed to the practice squad the next day. He was promoted back to the active roster on December 29, 2016.

On September 5, 2017, Ward was waived by the Buccaneers and was re-signed to the practice squad on September 14. He was promoted to the active roster on December 20, 2017.

On July 25, 2018, Ward was waived by the Buccaneers with a non-football injury designation after suffering a torn patellar tendon. He was released on September 19, 2018.

In October 2019, Ward was selected by the St. Louis BattleHawks in the 2020 XFL draft. He had his contract terminated when the league suspended operations on April 10, 2020.
