= Aberdeen Lake (Mississippi) =

Lake in the USA

- Location within Mississippi Location within the United States
- Location: Monroe County, Mississippi, United States
- Coordinates: 33°49′48″N 088°31′12″W
- Type: Reservoir
- Primary inflows: Tennessee-Tombigbee Waterway
- Primary outflows: Tennessee-Tombigbee Waterway
- Basin countries: United States
- Surface elevation: 160 ft (50 m)

Aberdeen Lake is a lake in northeast Mississippi on the Tennessee-Tombigbee Waterway. Close to Aberdeen, it is impounded by the Aberdeen Lock and Dam.
