= Aberdeen Lock and Dam =

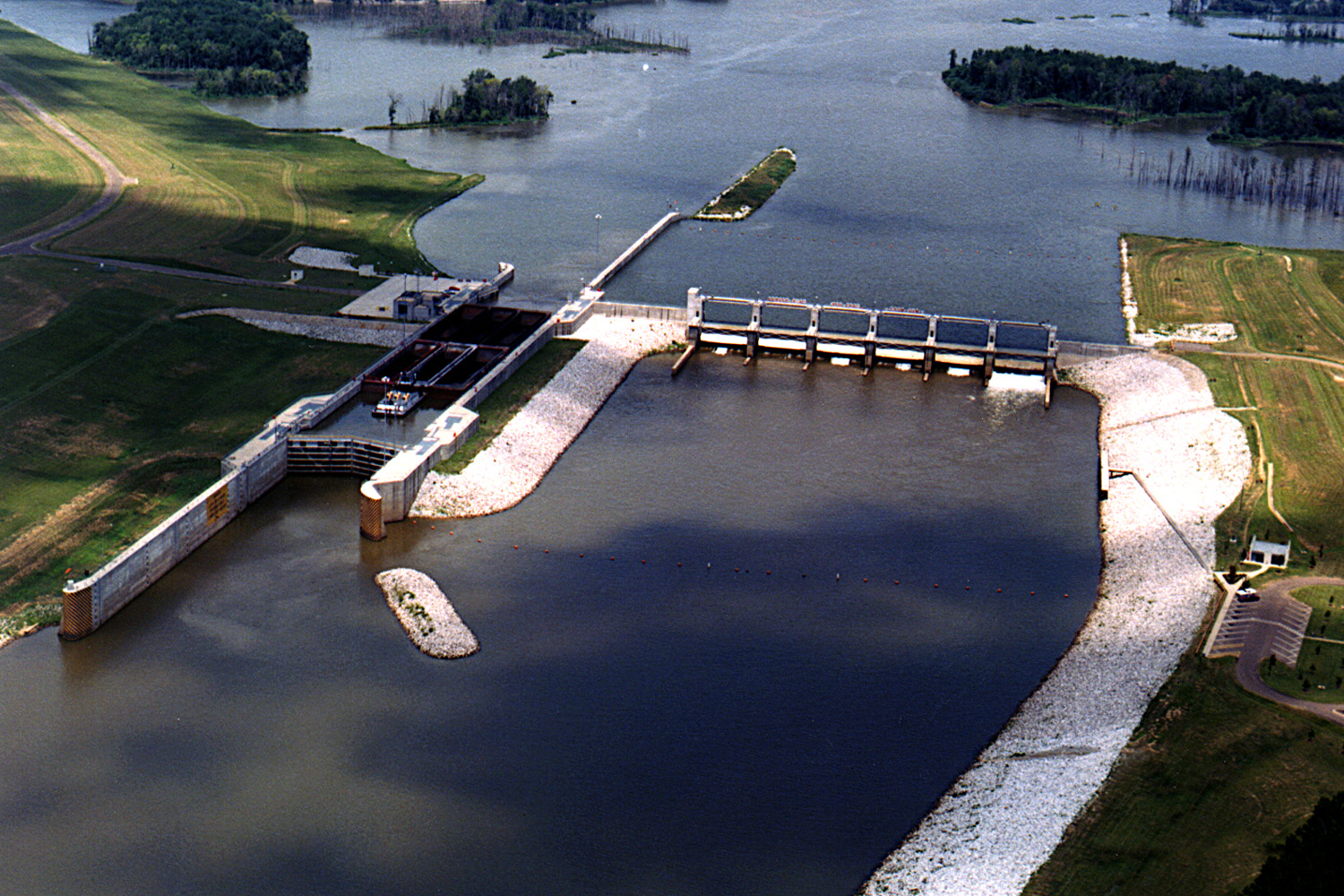
- Aerial view of Aberdeen Lock and Dam
- Interactive map of Aberdeen Lock and Dam
- Country: United States of America
- Location: Aberdeen, Mississippi
- Coordinates: 33°49′51″N 88°31′08″W
- Status: Operational
- Construction cost: $43.3 million
- Built by: United States Army Corps of Engineers
- Operator: Tennessee-Tombigbee Waterway

Reservoir
- Creates: Aberdeen Lake
- Surface area: 4,000 acres (1,600 ha)

The Aberdeen Lock and Dam is one of four lock and dam structures on the Tennessee-Tombigbee Waterway that generally lie along the original course of the Tombigbee River. It is located east of Aberdeen in Monroe County, Mississippi, and impounds Aberdeen Lake.
