= Nothing from Nothing =

- US single picture sleeve

Single by Billy Preston

from the album The Kids & Me
- B-side: "My Soul Is a Witness"
- Released: August 5, 1974
- Genre: Soul; pop; ragtime
- Length: 2:38
- Label: A&M
- Songwriters: Billy Preston; Bruce Fisher
- Producer: Billy Preston

Billy Preston singles chronology
"You're So Unique" (1974)	"Nothing from Nothing" (1974)	"Struttin'" (1974)

Music video
- "Nothing from Nothing" on YouTube

"Nothing from Nothing" is a song written by Billy Preston and Bruce Fisher and recorded by Billy Preston for his 1974 album The Kids & Me. The song reached #1 on the Billboard Hot 100 chart for one week in October 1974, becoming Preston's second solo chart-topper in the United States (following his 1973 hit "Will It Go Round in Circles"). It spent four and a half months on the chart.

Preston performed "Nothing from Nothing" on Saturday Night Live, the first musical performance ever on the show.

The song was also used in late 2002 for all GM-brand commercials and was also prominently featured in both the 1975 low-budget independent bank-heist caper Flash and the Firecat and the 2008 film Be Kind Rewind.

The song is also mentioned in the novel Just Above My Head by James Baldwin.

The song was also featured in the 2024 Apple TV+ animated Peanuts special Snoopy Presents: Welcome Home, Franklin. It was also featured at the end of the season 3 finale of The White Lotus.

== Charts ==
=== Weekly charts ===
Chart (1974)	Peak position
Australia (Kent Music Report)	60
Canada RPM Top Singles	5
US Billboard Hot 100	1
US Easy Listening (Billboard)	15
US Hot Soul Singles (Billboard)	8
US Cash Box Top 100	1
US Record World Singles	1

=== Year-end charts ===
Chart (1974)	Position
Canada	44
US Billboard Hot 100	37
US Cash Box Top 100	16

== Cover versions ==
Alternative rock band Lazlo Bane covered the song for their 2007 cover album Guilty Pleasures.

The artist Mac Miller covered the song for his 2018 Spotify session. This single was released posthumously.

The Billy Preston version is featured in Season 2 of South Park in episode 6, "The Mexican Staring Frog of Southern Sri Lanka," during a fictional interview of Bob Denver on the talk show Jesus and Pals.

American folk band The Ghost of Paul Revere released a cover version, both as a single and as the opening track to their 2019 album Field Notes, Vol. 2.

American musician Jon Batiste portrayed Billy Preston and performed a cover of the song in the 2024 film Saturday Night.
