= Fulton Lock =

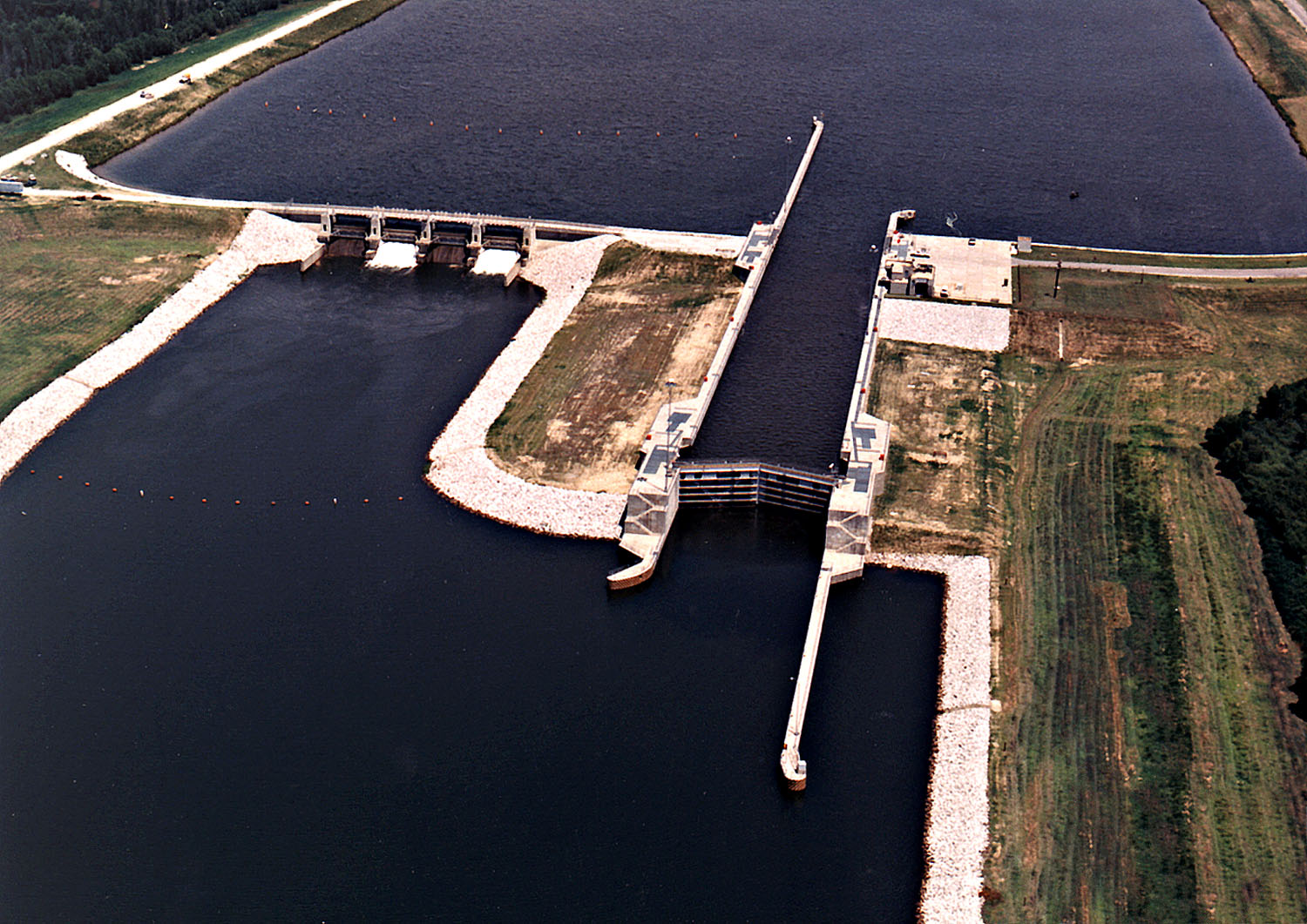
- Fulton Lock and Dam
- 34°15′28″N 88°25′29″W
- Waterway: Tennessee–Tombigbee Waterway
- Country: United States
- State: Mississippi
- County: Itawamba County
- Maintained by: United States Army Corps of Engineers
- Operation: Hydraulic
- First built: 1985
- Length: 600 ft (180 m)
- Width: 110 ft (34 m)
- Fall: 25 ft (7.6 m)

The Fulton Lock (formerly named Lock C) is a lock and dam on the Tennessee-Tombigbee Waterway.

== Location ==
The Fulton Lock is located in the city of Fulton, Mississippi, and the waterway forms the west boundary of the city.

U.S. Route 78 crosses the waterway at an overpass south of the Fulton Lock.

The Fulton Lock is located at mile 391 on the waterway, representing the navigational distance from the southern end of the waterway at the Cochrane–Africatown USA Bridge on U.S. Route 90 in Mobile, Alabama.

== Specifications ==
The Fulton Lock was constructed at a cost of $28.3 million, and it created a 1,643 acres (665 ha) lake north of the dam. Located on the lake are two recreation areas, as well as the Whitten Historical Center.

All locks on the waterway use marine radio channel 16 for standby; the Fulton Lock's unique marine radio channel is 74.

== Schedule ==
All locks of the Tennessee-Tombigbee Waterway operate 24 hours a day, 7 days a week. For large vessels, lock operations are made on demand. For pleasure boats using the Fulton Lock, the locks operate in the morning at 5, 7, 9, and 11 A.M., and in the afternoon at 1, 3, 5, and 7 P.M.

== Priority of usage ==
Certain vessels are given priority over others wishing to use the Fulton Lock. The priority status from greatest to least is: U.S. military craft, commercial passenger craft, commercial tows, commercial fisherman, pleasure boats.
