= Jamie Whitten Lock and Dam =

Coordinates: 34°31′20″N 88°19′30″W

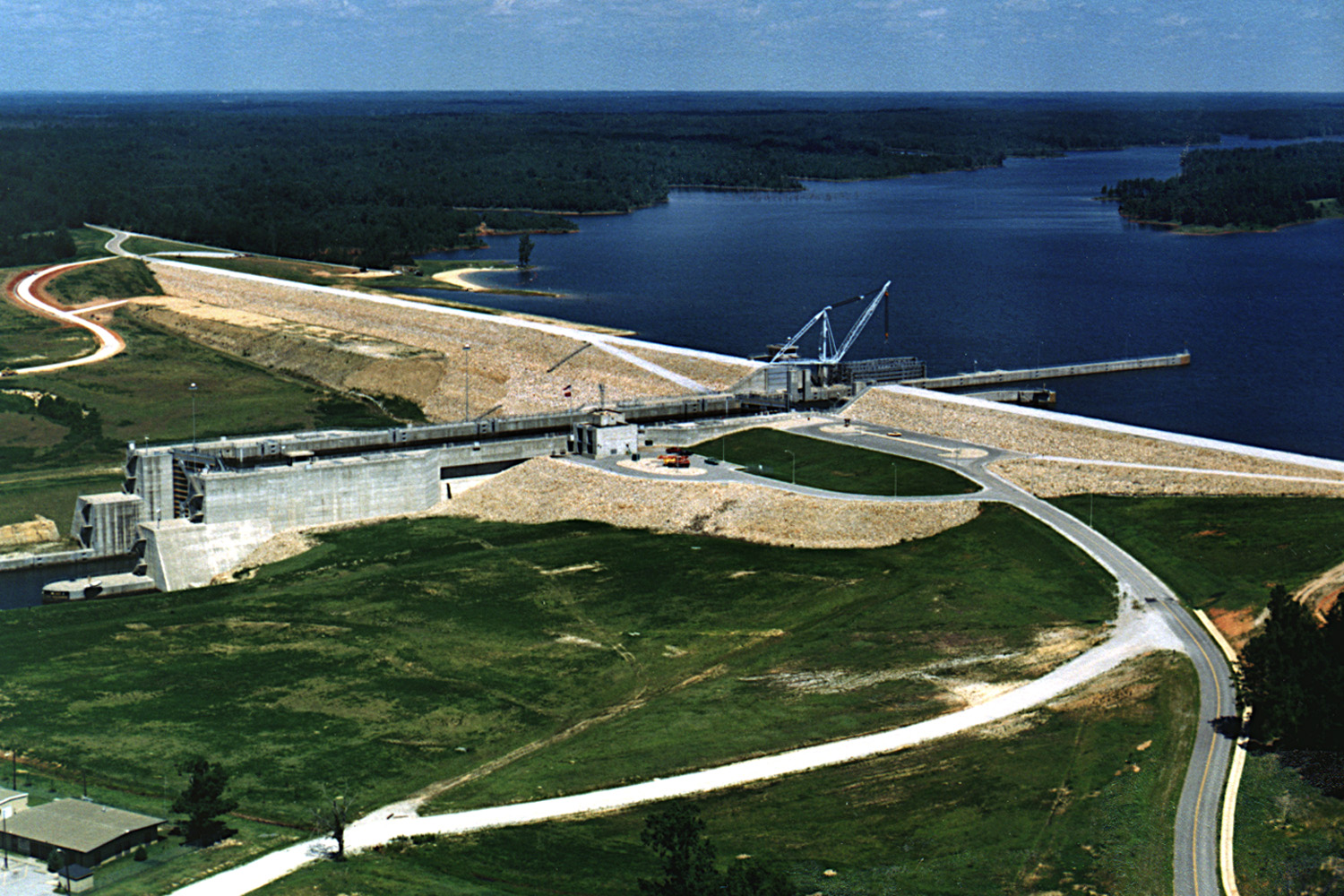
- Jamie Whitten Lock and Dam on the Tennessee-Tombigbee Waterway
- Interactive map of Jamie Whitten Lock and Dam
- Country: United States
- Status: Operational

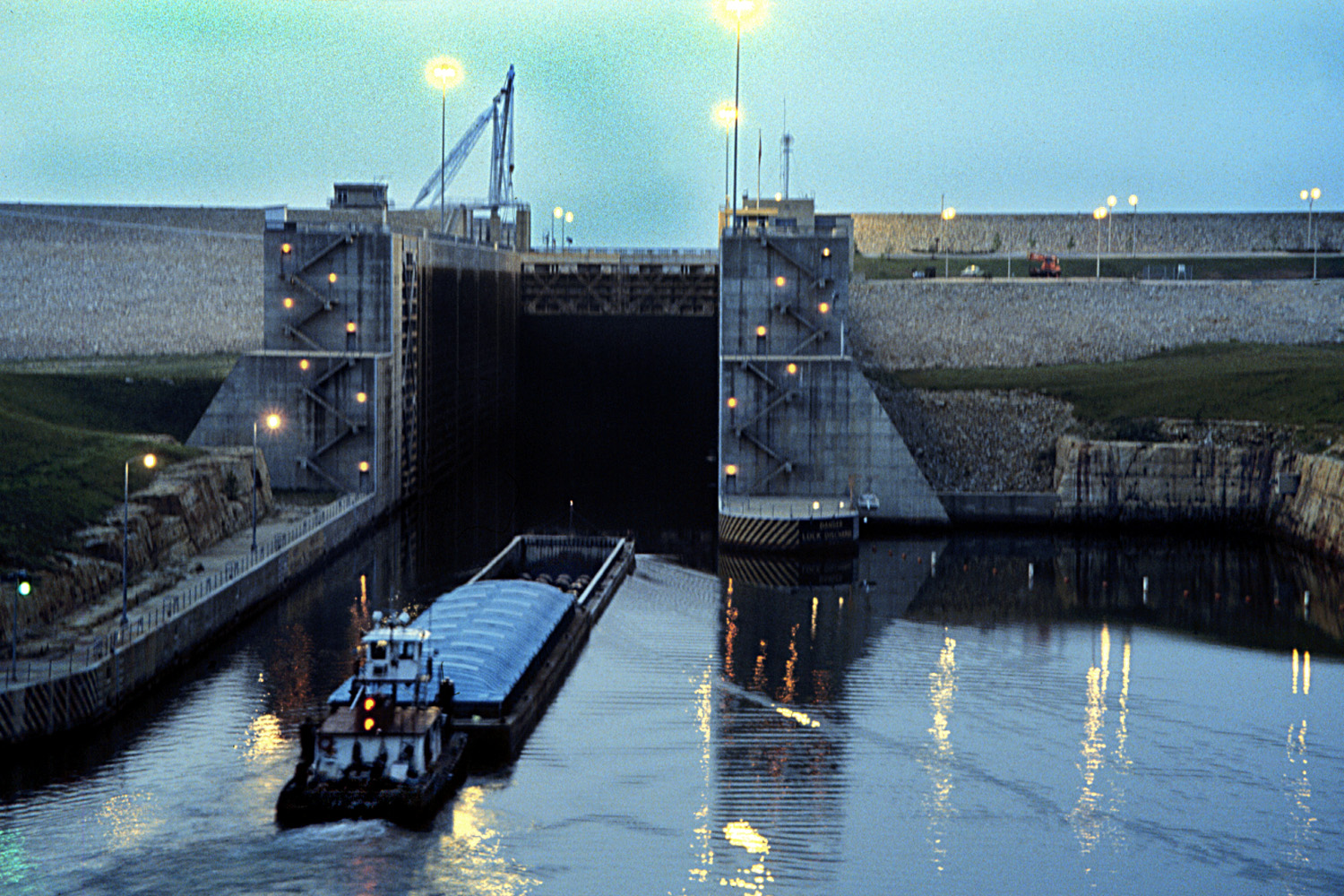
A tow entering the downstream end of Jamie Whitten Lock

The Jamie Whitten Lock and Dam (formerly named Bay Springs Lock and Dam) is part of the Tennessee-Tombigbee Waterway (popularly called the Tenn-Tom). It is located in south Tishomingo County, Mississippi, United States, close to the Prentiss County line.

It is the northernmost lock and dam on the Tenn-Tom, and was completed at a cost of US$75 million. The lock is the fourth-highest single lift lock in the United States, and raises and lowers barges 84 feet (26 m). The dam forms Bay Springs Lake.

Originally named Bay Springs Lock and Dam, the structure was renamed for Jamie Whitten, who served Mississippi in the United States House of Representatives for over 50 years (as of 2008, Whitten had the longest tenure of any Representative in history).
