= Aberdeen, Mississippi =

- City
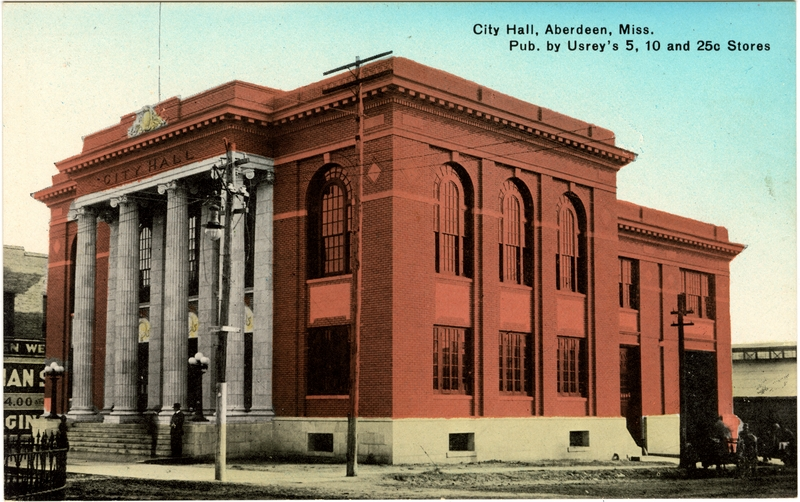
- Aberdeen City Hall (early 20th century)

- Flag
- Motto: "A Great Place to Live, Work and Play"
- Location of Aberdeen, Mississippi

- Location in the United States
- Coordinates: 33°49′22″N 88°31′40″W
- Country: United States
- State: Mississippi
- County: Monroe

Government
  - Mayor: Dwight Stevens

Area
  - Total: 12.37 sq mi (32.04 km^{2})
  - Land: 12.09 sq mi (31.31 km^{2})
  - Water: 0.28 sq mi (0.73 km^{2})
- Elevation: 230 ft (70 m)

Population (2020)
  - Total: 4,961
  - Density: 410.3/sq mi (158.43/km^{2})
- Time zone: UTC-6 (Central (CST))
  - Summer (DST): UTC-5 (CDT)
- ZIP code: 39730
- Area code: 662
- FIPS code: 28-00180
- GNIS feature ID: 2403058
- Website: cityofaberdeenms.com

Aberdeen is a city in and the county seat of Monroe County, Mississippi, United States. As of the 2020 census, the population was 4,961, down from 5,612 in 2010.

Located on the banks of the Tombigbee River, Aberdeen was one of the busiest Mississippi ports of the 19th century. Cotton was heavily traded in town, and for a time Aberdeen was Mississippi's second largest city. Aberdeen retains many historic structures from this period, with over 200 buildings on the National Register of Historic Places. In the spring of each year, Aberdeen hosts pilgrimages to its historic antebellum homes. The most prominent of these antebellum homes is The Magnolias, which was built in 1850.

Located just outside the city, Aberdeen Lock and Dam forms Aberdeen Lake, a popular recreational area. Aberdeen Lock and Dam is part of the Tennessee-Tombigbee waterway system.

== History ==
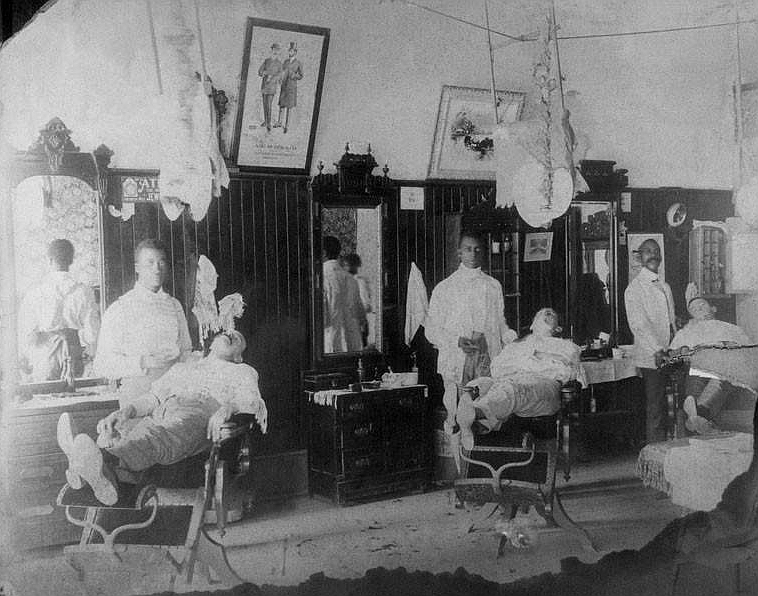
Barbershop in Aberdeen, 1907

In 1540, Hernando DeSoto's expedition was the first occasion that Europeans traveled through the vicinity of Aberdeen.

Aberdeen was first settled in 1834 and chartered as a town in 1837. In 1849, it replaced Athens as the county seat.

On February 18, 1864, during the American Civil War, a skirmish occurred between the Union army and the Confederate army in Aberdeen. Lieutenant Colonel Burgh and the 9th Illinois Cavalry Regiment came into contact with Confederate militias, driving them back and taking possession of Aberdeen. The battle resulted in the company taking 18 prisoners of war, as well as the destruction of Confederate food supplies and machinery.

In 1870, The Mobile and Ohio Railroad extended a branch line to Aberdeen from Aberdeen Junction, later Muldon, Mississippi.

Hiram Revels, the first African-American United States senator, died in Aberdeen on January 16, 1901, while he was attending a church conference.

Aberdeen had a population of 3,708 in 1910. Its population had risen to 5,920 by 1950. Its population was 7,184 in 1980.

== Geography ==
Variant names are "Dundee" and "New Aberdeen".

Aberdeen is located southwest of the center of Monroe County. The downtown area lies on a low rise overlooking the original channel of the Tombigbee River to the east. U.S. Highway 45 passes through the south and west sides of the city as a bypass, leading north 35 miles (56 km) to Tupelo and south 27 miles (43 km) to Columbus. Mississippi Highway 8 passes through the south side of the city with US 45, leading northeast 14 miles (23 km) to U.S. Highway 278 at Wise Gap and west 30 miles (48 km) to Houston. State Highway 25 also passes through the south side of the city, leading north-northeast 15 miles (24 km) to Amory and southwest 18 miles (29 km) to West Point.

According to the U.S. Census Bureau, Aberdeen has a total area of 12.4 square miles (32 km^{2}), of which 12.1 square miles (31 km^{2}) are land and 0.3 square miles (0.8 km^{2}), or 2.28%, are water. The Tombigbee River and the Tennessee–Tombigbee Waterway flow southward through the east end of the city. Aberdeen Lock and Dam on the waterway is within the city limits, less than a mile south of the city's northern border.

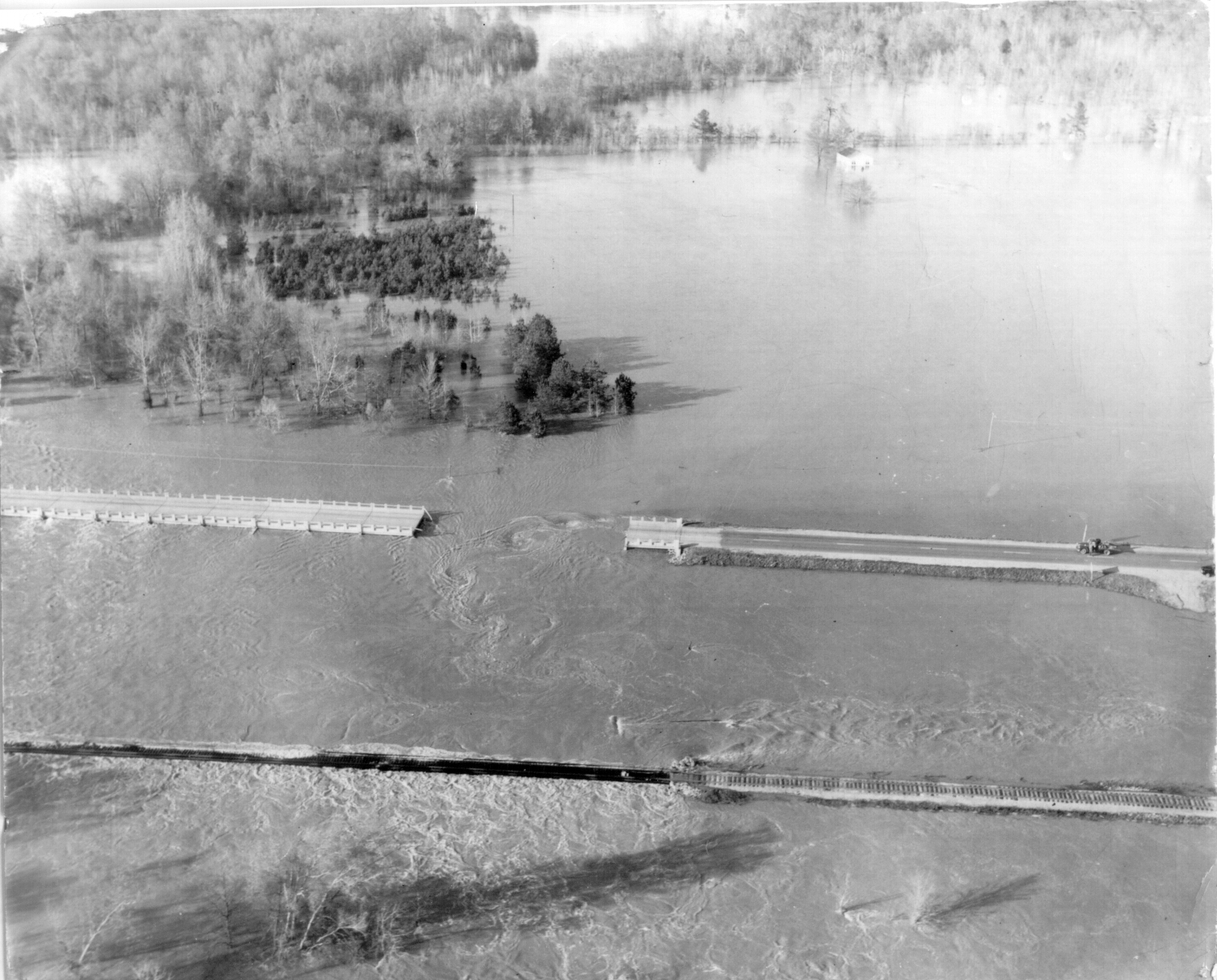
Failure of the Mississippi Highway 25 N/U.S. Route 45 S bridge over the Tombigbee River in Aberdeen during the 1955 floods.

=== Climate ===
The climate in this area is characterized by hot, humid summers and generally mild to cool winters. According to the Köppen Climate Classification system, Aberdeen has a humid subtropical climate, abbreviated "Cfa" on climate maps.

Climate data for Aberdeen, Mississippi (1991–2020 normals, extremes 1892–present)
Month	Jan	Feb	Mar	Apr	May	Jun	Jul	Aug	Sep	Oct	Nov	Dec	Year
Record high °F (°C)	85 (29)	87 (31)	95 (35)	95 (35)	104 (40)	108 (42)	114 (46)	109 (43)	106 (41)	98 (37)	89 (32)	87 (31)	114 (46)
Mean daily maximum °F (°C)	52.3 (11.3)	56.7 (13.7)	65.3 (18.5)	73.3 (22.9)	81.0 (27.2)	87.5 (30.8)	90.4 (32.4)	89.9 (32.2)	85.2 (29.6)	75.2 (24.0)	63.5 (17.5)	54.7 (12.6)	72.9 (22.7)
Daily mean °F (°C)	41.5 (5.3)	45.1 (7.3)	53.1 (11.7)	60.9 (16.1)	69.3 (20.7)	76.5 (24.7)	79.8 (26.6)	79.1 (26.2)	73.7 (23.2)	62.6 (17.0)	51.1 (10.6)	43.8 (6.6)	61.4 (16.3)
Mean daily minimum °F (°C)	30.7 (−0.7)	33.4 (0.8)	40.9 (4.9)	48.4 (9.1)	57.5 (14.2)	65.4 (18.6)	69.2 (20.7)	68.4 (20.2)	62.2 (16.8)	50.0 (10.0)	38.6 (3.7)	32.8 (0.4)	49.8 (9.9)
Record low °F (°C)	−10 (−23)	−15 (−26)	14 (−10)	26 (−3)	34 (1)	43 (6)	52 (11)	50 (10)	34 (1)	23 (−5)	7 (−14)	−5 (−21)	−15 (−26)
Average precipitation inches (mm)	4.97 (126)	5.30 (135)	4.56 (116)	5.79 (147)	4.76 (121)	4.28 (109)	4.30 (109)	3.46 (88)	3.74 (95)	3.32 (84)	3.98 (101)	5.80 (147)	54.26 (1,378)
Average snowfall inches (cm)	0.1 (0.25)	0.0 (0.0)	0.0 (0.0)	0.0 (0.0)	0.0 (0.0)	0.0 (0.0)	0.0 (0.0)	0.0 (0.0)	0.0 (0.0)	0.0 (0.0)	0.0 (0.0)	0.0 (0.0)	0.1 (0.25)
Average precipitation days (≥ 0.01 in)	10.2	9.6	9.6	8.2	9.0	9.2	9.3	7.6	6.0	6.9	7.6	9.6	102.8
Average snowy days (≥ 0.1 in)	0.1	0.0	0.0	0.0	0.0	0.0	0.0	0.0	0.0	0.0	0.0	0.0	0.1
Source: NOAA

== Demographics ==
Historical population
Census	Pop.	Note	%±
1870	2,022		—
1880	2,339		15.7%
1890	3,449		47.5%
1900	3,434		−0.4%
1910	3,708		8.0%
1920	4,071		9.8%
1930	3,925		−3.6%
1940	4,746		20.9%
1950	5,290		11.5%
1960	6,450		21.9%
1970	6,507		0.9%
1980	7,184		10.4%
1990	6,837		−4.8%
2000	6,415		−6.2%
2010	5,612		−12.5%
2020	4,961		−11.6%
U.S. Decennial Census

=== 2020 census ===
As of the 2020 census, Aberdeen had a population of 4,961. The median age was 42.0 years. 21.9% of residents were under the age of 18 and 20.4% of residents were 65 years of age or older. For every 100 females there were 86.4 males, and for every 100 females age 18 and over there were 80.7 males age 18 and over.

0.0% of residents lived in urban areas, while 100.0% lived in rural areas.

There were 2,051 households in Aberdeen, of which 30.1% had children under the age of 18 living in them. Of all households, 27.4% were married-couple households, 20.1% were households with a male householder and no spouse or partner present, and 47.0% were households with a female householder and no spouse or partner present. About 34.6% of all households were made up of individuals and 14.7% had someone living alone who was 65 years of age or older. As of the 2020 census, there were 1,195 families residing in the city.

There were 2,416 housing units, of which 15.1% were vacant. The homeowner vacancy rate was 1.6% and the rental vacancy rate was 14.4%.

Racial composition as of the 2020 census
Race	Number	Percent
White	1,257	25.3%
Black or African American	3,513	70.8%
American Indian and Alaska Native	10	0.2%
Asian	17	0.3%
Native Hawaiian and Other Pacific Islander	1	0.0%
Some other race	31	0.6%
Two or more races	132	2.7%
Hispanic or Latino (of any race)	55	1.1%

=== 2010 census ===
As of the 2010 United States census, there were 5,612 people living in the city. 69.2% were African American, 28.8% White, 0.1% Native American, 0.2% Asian, 0.0% Pacific Islander, 0.6% from some other race and 1.0% of two or more races. 1.0% were Hispanic or Latino of any race.

=== 2000 census ===
As of the census of 2000, there were 6,415 people, 2,398 households, and 1,661 families living in the city. The population density was 598.8 inhabitants per square mile (231.2/km^{2}). There were 2,730 housing units at an average density of 254.8 per square mile (98.4/km^{2}). The racial makeup of the city was 60.20% African American, 38.78% White, 0.09% Native American, 0.39% Asian, 0.05% Pacific Islander, 0.06% from other races, and 0.42% from two or more races. Hispanic or Latino of any race were 0.56% of the population.

There were 2,398 households, out of which 36.3% had children under the age of 18 living with them, 35.8% were married couples living together, 29.9% had a female householder with no husband present, and 30.7% were non-families. 27.6% of all households were made up of individuals, and 13.6% had someone living alone who was 65 years of age or older. The average household size was 2.58 and the average family size was 3.14.

In the city, the population was spread out, with 29.8% under the age of 18, 8.8% from 18 to 24, 25.7% from 25 to 44, 19.8% from 45 to 64, and 15.9% who were 65 years of age or older. The median age was 34 years. For every 100 females, there were 78.8 males. For every 100 females age 18 and over, there were 69.7 males.

The median income for a household in the city was $23,530, and the median income for a family was $27,611. Males had a median income of $27,857 versus $17,090 for females. The per capita income for the city was $11,584. About 26.3% of families and 29.6% of the population were below the poverty line, including 42.2% of those under age 18 and 26.7% of those age 65 or over.

== Education ==
All of the city limits is served by the Aberdeen School District.

== Media ==
=== Radio stations ===
1240 WWZQ-AM 105.3 WACR-FM

== Infrastructure ==
=== Highways ===
- U.S. Highway 45
- Mississippi Highway 8
- Mississippi Highway 25
- Mississippi Highway 145

=== Railroads ===
- Burlington Northern and Santa Fe Railway
- Alabama and Gulf Coast Railway
- Kansas City Southern Railway

== Notable people ==
- Joel M. Acker, member of the Mississippi State Senate and Mississippi House of Representatives
- Stephen Adams, member of United States House of Representatives and United States Senate
- Steve Baylark, running back for Sacramento Mountain Lions of United Football League
- Guy Bush ("the Mississippi Mudcat"), Major League Baseball pitcher
- Oliver Darden, basketball player for University of Michigan
- Reuben Davis, Congressman and Confederate general
- James Bell Dickson, U.S. Army Air Forces pilot
- Wilma Cozart Fine, record producer
- Jeff Fort, mobster and co-founder of the Black P. Stones
- Samuel J. Gholson, congressman, judge and general in the Confederate States Army
- Joe Green, former NFL defensive back
- Ann Gregory, golfer
- Moses Hardy, formerly oldest living American man, one of the oldest veterans of World War I
- Lock E. Houston, former member of the Mississippi House of Representatives
- Reggie Kelly, former NFL tight end
- Albert King, blues guitarist
- Fredrick McGhee, first black lawyer in Minnesota, co-founder of the Niagara Movement
- James Phelan Sr., member of the Confederate Congress from 1862 to 1864
- James Phelan Jr., member of the United States House of Representatives from 1887 to 1891
- R. O. Reynolds, member of the Mississippi State Senate
- Roscoe Simmons, orator and journalist, nephew of Booker T. Washington
- Georgia Speller, artist
- Eugene Sykes, justice of the Supreme Court of Mississippi and chairman of Federal Communications Commission
- Rozzell Sykes, artist
- Butch Thompson, college baseball head coach
- Frederick I. Thompson, commissioner of the Federal Communications Commission from 1939 to 1941
- Andre Townsend, former defensive end for the Denver Broncos
- Jim Walden, head football coach at Washington State and Iowa State University
- Channing Ward, former NFL defensive tackle
- Bukka White (Booker T. Washington White), blues musician
- Dwayne Whitfield, former National Basketball Association player
- Chris Willis, former head football coach of the University of North Alabama

== In popular culture ==
The city of Aberdeen is the subject of the HGTV show Hometown Renovation, where local makeup artist and designer Billy Brasfield sets to redesign and renovate some of the city's houses and landmarks.

The city is the subject of the song "Aberdeen, Mississippi", by blues artist Bukka White, later covered by guitarist Kenny Wayne Shepherd as "Aberdeen".
