= Moses Hardy =

American supercentenarian (1894–2006)

- Hardy at age 110 or 111
- Born: January 6, 1894; Aberdeen, Mississippi, U.S.
- Died: December 7, 2006 (aged 112 years, 335 days); Aberdeen, Mississippi, U.S.
- Military career
- Allegiance: United States of America
- Branch: United States Army
- Service years: July 1918–July 1919
- Unit: 805th Pioneer Infantry
- Conflicts: World War I
- Awards: Victory Medal; Occupational Medal; Légion d'honneur

Moses Hardy (January 6, 1894 – December 7, 2006) was, at age 112, the last surviving African-American veteran of World War I and one of the last surviving American veterans of the war in general. The son of former slaves, Hardy lived a religious and farming life until he signed up to serve overseas in World War I in July 1918. As an African American during the Jim Crow era, he served in the segregated 805th Pioneer Infantry, which was assigned a variety of manual labor and support tasks. Hardy himself served as a scout, supplying the front line troops when necessary. Though Hardy did experience combat, he was never seriously injured and rarely discussed his experiences concerning the fighting. Instead, he preferred to recount stories about the food, the bravery of the soldiers and the weather in France.

After the war, he took on a variety of jobs including school bus driver, farmer, deacon and cosmetics salesman, the latter of which he performed well past his 100th birthday. He received the Victory Medal, a special medal from the Mississippi National Guard and the French Légion d'honneur. In 1999, the Mississippi Legislature adopted a resolution recognizing him as an outstanding citizen of Mississippi. At the time of his death, aged 112, he was recognized as the oldest combat veteran ever, the oldest male ever recorded in Mississippi and the second-oldest man and World War I veteran in the world.

== Early life ==
Hardy was born in Aberdeen, Mississippi in 1894. Although he claimed to have been born in 1893, census records show he was born in 1894. Hardy's parents, Morris Hardy—born in the 1840s—and Nancy Hardy, were former slaves who after the Civil War had purchased 265 acres (1.07 km^{2}) of land in Mississippi from a Chickasaw Native American for a dollar. The Hardy family was a deeply religious one, and Moses would later recount that Exodus 20:12, which instructed one to honor their parents, was his favorite Bible passage and one which he lived by. Hardy was married once, to a woman by the name of Fannie Marshall, with whom he would end up having eight children.

== Military career ==
Hardy's service in France lasted from July 1918 to July 1919, and included thirty-nine combat days. As an African American, he served in a segregated army unit, the 805th Pioneer Infantry, which was commanded by white officers. Although the unit's purpose was to provide support for engineer regiments, it was also an infantry unit that was equipped to fight if necessary. The unit focused mainly of the tasks of stevedores, such as unloading cargo from ships, but also performed other manual labor tasks, such as cooking and organizing burials. Hardy's outfit was armed solely with rifles, instead of standard-issue machine guns. After the war, Hardy's division was responsible for cleaning up the battlefields and removing the dead.

Hardy himself admitted to his family that he was "scared to death" when he first arrived overseas, but believed that the soldiers were fed something to make them brave, which he referred to as "brave pills". After a short time in the military, he claimed that he was not afraid of anything that he experienced from then on. Even in the heat of battle, Hardy professed that he would get "wound up" at times, but never frightened. He recalled many strange experiences with food and drink, such as getting used to drinking green water from canteens and eating hardtacks, which he found to be surprisingly filling. To go with this, there was often little more than small tins of ham or chicken and occasionally coffee to drink and pudding or pie for dessert. Hardy also witnessed many of his friends get killed in action, and relied on his faith in God to get him through the toughest times.

Hardy often acted as a scout who would help bring supplies to troops on the front line. On September 25, 1918, he was present at the Meuse River during a mustard gas attack and, at some point during the war, he received an injury to his knee. Hardy rarely spoke about the fighting itself, and preferred to talk about France's weather when asked about his experiences overseas.

== Post-World War I ==
Throughout the years, he received the Victory Medal, the Occupational Medal from the Mississippi Army National Guard, an honourable discharge (which he had not received upon leaving the army) and the French Légion d'honneur. In 1999, when he was 105 years old, the Mississippi Legislature adopted a resolution recognizing him as an outstanding citizen of Mississippi. At the time, he was known as the oldest living World War I veteran, as Emiliano Mercado del Toro had not yet been discovered. He was interviewed by Treehouse Productions in 2006 as part of their Living History Project, a radio tribute to the last surviving World War I veterans that was hosted by Walter Cronkite. Though he could not speak coherently, his son Haywood Hardy, himself 80 years old at the time, recalled some of the stories that his father had told him.

Hardy did not serve in World War II and instead drove a school bus, farmed and sold liniments and wigs for "Lucky Heart" cosmetics until his retirement. He reportedly continued to go door-to-door for several years past his centenary, even resorting to phone sales when his children hid the keys of his 1972 Chevrolet Caprice. The youngest of his eight children, Jean Dukes, was born in the late 1940s. He also served as a deacon and superintendent of a Sunday School class at Mount Olive Church for over 75 years. His son claimed that, until about four years before he died, his father was healthy enough to drive his car into town every day. Hardy's longevity was also credited to a daily meal that consisted of cabbage, corn bread, butter milk, potatoes and Dr Pepper, and the fact that he never drank alcohol or smoked in his life. Until a few years before his death, it was claimed that Hardy had never had a seriously ill day in his life and that he never took medicine, as it only made him sick. Hardy lived on his own until 2004 when his legs weakened and he found it almost impossible to walk. He was placed in a rest home, but was still able to feed himself and pass the days watching television.

At the time of his death, he was the oldest United States combat veteran ever, the oldest male ever recorded in Mississippi and had outlived at least three of his eight children. It was reported that he had several dozen grandchildren and great-grandchildren. He was the second-oldest man and World War I veteran behind only del Toro and the last African American one. Although he suffered from mild dementia in his later years and had trouble speaking coherently, he was reported to have been completely lucid through his final days and his death was attributed to natural causes.

== See also ==
- List of the verified oldest people
- Longevity
- Supercentenarian
