= Tennessee–Tombigbee Waterway =

Artificial waterway in the southeastern United States

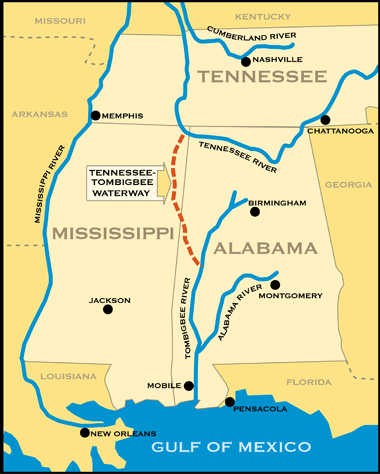
Tennessee-Tombigbee Waterway (red)

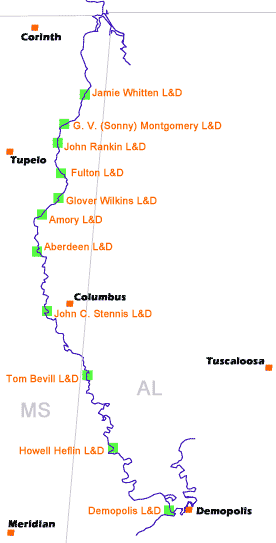
The locks and dams (L&D) along the Tennessee-Tombigbee Waterway

The Tennessee–Tombigbee Waterway (popularly known as the Tenn-Tom) is a 234-mile (377 km) artificial waterway built in the 20th century from the Tennessee River to the junction of the Black Warrior-Tombigbee River system near Demopolis, Alabama, United States. The Tennessee–Tombigbee Waterway links commercial navigation from the nation's midsection to the Gulf of Mexico. The major features of the waterway are 234 miles (377 km) of navigation channels, a 175-foot-deep (53 m) cut between the watersheds of the Tombigbee and Tennessee rivers, and ten locks and dams. The locks are 110 by 600 feet (34 m × 183 m) with a depth of 9 feet (2.7 m), the same dimension as those on the Mississippi above Lock and Dam 26 at Alton, Illinois. Under construction for 12 years by the U.S. Army Corps of Engineers, the Tennessee–Tombigbee Waterway was completed in December 1984 at a total cost of nearly $2 billion.

The Tenn-Tom encompasses 17 public ports and terminals, 110,000 acres (450 km^{2}) of land, and another 88,000 acres (360 km^{2}) managed by state conservation agencies for wildlife habitat preservation and recreational use.

== Early history ==
First proposed by the Spanish in the sixteenth century, the idea for a commercial waterway link between the Tennessee and Tombigbee rivers did not receive serious attention until the advent of river steamboat traffic in the early nineteenth century. It stimulated trade throughout the river cities, and the ability to get products to the Gulf Coast for overseas shipping. As steamboat efficiency gains caused water transport costs to decline, in 1875 engineers surveyed a potential canal route for the first time. They issued a negative report, emphasizing that prohibitive cost estimates kept the project from economic feasibility.

Enthusiasm for the project languished until the presidency of Franklin D. Roosevelt, who took office during the Great Depression and quickly conceived of investment in major infrastructure projects to put many of the unemployed to work. The development of the Tennessee River by the TVA, especially the construction of the Pickwick Lock and Dam in 1938, helped decrease the Tenn-Tom's potential economic costs and increase its potential benefits. Pickwick Lake's design included an embayment on its south shore at Yellow Creek, which would permit the design and construction of an entrance to a future southward waterway (leading to the Tombigbee River), should it be decided that such a waterway would be built in the future.

Later, construction (under World War II emergency authorization) of Kentucky Dam at Gilbertsville, Kentucky, near the mouth of the Tennessee River's confluence with the Ohio River, would complete the "northern" half of the future waterway. As early as 1941 the proposal was combined with those for other waterways, such as the St. Lawrence Seaway, with the aim of building broader political support. Congress authorized the Tennessee-Tombigbee Waterway Project in the River and Harbor Act of 1946.

The northern, Divide Cut, portion of the proposed waterway was investigated in 1965 as a candidate for the use of nuclear explosives as part of Project Plowshare. Three routes were considered, including the Yellow Creek route that was eventually chosen for the conventional excavation. The Bear Creek route was considered best for nuclear explosives, as it was rocky and more likely to be stable following blasts. The nuclear excavation proposal for Bear Creek envisioned 81 nuclear devices ranging from 10 to 50 kilotons, with a total explosive yield of 1.9 megatons. A cost analysis indicated that nuclear explosives would increase costs from 31 to 73 percent over conventional excavation on the Yellow Creek route. Two safety analyses recommended that the project not be pursued. The studies projected severe damage to nearby communities from air blast, seismic motion, groundwater contamination, and fallout. No further study was undertaken, and conventional excavation was pursued.

As part of his "Southern Strategy" for election, Republican President Richard Nixon committed to the project. He included $1 million in the Corps of Engineers' 1971 budget to start construction of the Tenn-Tom. Funding shortages and legal challenges delayed construction until December 1972, but Nixon's efforts initiated official Tenn-Tom waterway construction. Senators John C. Stennis, James O. Eastland, John J. Sparkman, and Howard Baker also played significant roles in securing approval for the project. Making the case that the waterway would spur economic development through significant foreign demand for Appalachian coal, they described the Tenn-Tom as the "Ruhr Valley of the South."

== Construction ==
The U.S. Army Corps of Engineers began work on the project in 1972. During the construction process, land excavation reached about 175 feet (53 m) in depth and required the excavation of nearly 310 million cubic yards of soil (the equivalent of more than 100 million dump truck loads). The project was completed on December 12, 1984, nearly two years ahead of schedule, and it opened for traffic in January, 1985.

== Political challenges ==
The $2 billion in required funding for the Tenn-Tom waterway was repeatedly attacked by elected representatives and political organizations. Opponents asserted that the estimated economic benefits of the waterway by the Corps of Engineers were unsupportable based on projected traffic volume and that the Corps had inserted deceptive calculations into the cost-benefit analysis. By 1977, the Tenn-Tom was one of many such Corps of Engineers projects that had been initiated in the belief that they would directly or indirectly return to the Treasury their cost(s) of construction.

Immediately after his election in 1976, Democratic President Jimmy Carter announced a plan to slash Tenn-Tom federal funding, as part of broader reductions in federal spending. Carter, and the economic advisors recruited to his administration, objected to the "waste" of taxpayer dollars on "pork-barrel projects". But, after more than 6,500 waterway supporters attended a public hearing held in Columbus, Mississippi, as part of Carter's review of the proposed waterway, the President withdrew his opposition.

=== Environmental opposition ===
As one of the first major projects subject to the 1970 National Environmental Policy Act (NEPA), there was significant environmental opposition to the Tenn-Tom before and during its construction. Environmental protest started in the local region, led by the Committee for Leaving the Environment of America Natural (CLEAN). Environmental concerns included the geological effects of significant excavation, destruction of river and wetland ecosystems, unknown ecological effects of mixing the two rivers' watersheds, and the politically charged esthetic effect of eliminating the region's last major free-flowing river. While the Corps started from the position that the Tenn-Tom would be an environmental enhancement to the region, environmental activists believed that the required NEPA review would stop the project. By 1970, the Corps had adopted a pastoral strategy of minor, symbolic concessions, including changes in rhetoric used to promote the project and to design, including replacing part of the planned canal with a chain of lakes and changing the design of Columbus Dam to protect Plymouth Bluff's fossil bed.

A draft Environmental Impact Statement (EIS) was completed January 15, 1971. After the Council on Environmental Quality (CEQ) accepted the EIS, national environmental groups such as the Environmental Defense Fund and Friends of the Earth joined the opposition. Following the strategy that had been used successfully to stop construction of the Cross Florida Barge Canal, CLEAN and EDF filed a federal lawsuit in July, 1971, resulting in a one-year injunction. After the case was transferred to the U.S. District Court for the Northern District of Mississippi, the court ruled in favor of the Corps, and construction began in 1972. In 1976, the Louisville and Nashville Railroad joined the environmental groups suing to halt construction of the waterway. Railroad companies, which served as a major transport alternative to river traffic and stood to potentially lose the most value from construction of the waterway, brought additional resources to the litigation alleging that the project violated NEPA. Federal courts ruled in favor of the project in 1983.

=== Cultural preservation ===
Construction of the waterway also faced political challenges related to preservation of cultural resources. At 2,000 square miles, the Tenn-Tom was one of the country's largest cultural resource management programs. When the project began, federal policy for cultural resources management included the Reservoir Salvage Act, the National Historic Preservation Act (NHPA), and the National Park Service Interagency Archeological Salvage Program. Archeologists generally approached the project as an opportunity with benefits for their academic departments. The initial approach to cultural preservation focused on ad hoc surveys of individual sites, working quickly to keep pace with construction. In response to researcher interests and this existing policy framework, the early preservation work focused on prehistoric sites.

After 1974, the project was also subject to the Archeological and Historic Preservation Act (AHPA). After new leadership was appointed for the Interagency Archeological Salvage Program, a more holistic approach was adopted to identify key research questions and strategically gather data to answer them. While this strategy was intended to take greater account of historic, above-ground structures affected by waterway construction, it was not entirely successful in shifting away from the predominance of below-ground archeological salvage. In total, 14 structures were recommended for inclusion in the National Register of Historic Places.

=== Local economic development ===
In the decades leading up to construction of the Tenn-Tom, over 50 million people, mostly Black, migrated out of the 165 primarily poor, rural counties affected by the project due to lack of employment opportunities. Because extensive employment growth was projected in the area, about 15% of it attributable to the Tenn-Tom development, a Minority People's Council on the Tennessee-Tombigbee Waterway (MPC) was formed, in coalition with construction craft unions. To help direct distribution of economic benefits to the local resident low-income and Black population, the MPC worked to secure an affirmative action plan for minority employment in the Waterway's construction, employment training programs, community education about the Waterway's economic impact, and partnerships with educational institutions.

== Economic effects ==
When completed, the Tenn-Tom waterway provided a route from the Ohio and Tennessee Valleys to the Gulf of Mexico that was 547 mile shorter than the Mississippi route, estimated to reduce transportation costs by 40%.

However, the Tenn-Tom waterway's total cost was $1.992 billion, including non-federal costs. Some political and economic commentators derided the project as "pork-barrel politics at its worst". As late as 1982, with construction two-thirds completed, critics argued that the best course of action would be to stop construction, questioning the Corps' economic analyses. For the first few years after its completion, such criticism appeared valid. The Tennessee–Tombigbee Waterway had opened in the midst of an economic recession in the barge business, which resulted in initially disappointingly low use of the waterway.

The 1988 drought, however, closed the Mississippi River and shifted traffic to the Tenn-Tom canal. This coincided with an economic turnaround on the Tennessee-Tombigbee corridor, wherein trade tonnage and commercial investment increased steadily over several years.

The two primary commodities shipped via the Tenn-Tom are coal and timber products, together comprising about 70 percent of total commercial shipping on the waterway. The Tenn-Tom also provides access to over 34 million acres (140,000 km^{2}) of commercial forests and approximately two-thirds of all recoverable coal reserves in the nation. Industries that use these natural resources have found the waterway to be their most cost-efficient mode of transportation. Other popular trade products carried on the Tenn-Tom include grain, gravel, sand, and iron.

A 2009 study by Troy University found that the waterway had contributed nearly $43 billion in direct, indirect, and induced economic benefits to the United States, including the direct creation of more than 29,000 jobs, and was replacing an annual average of 284,000 truckloads.

== Environmental impacts and mitigation ==
During construction of the Tenn-Tom, opponents expressed concern that it would draw down the aquifers, affecting water supply, and that it would cause waterlogging; studies did not find evidence of these impacts.

Concerns were also raised that connecting the two rivers would cause ecological disruption. In an example of this impact, the Mississippi silverside entered the Waterway from the Tennessee River during construction and the population of the native brook silverside subsequently declined. A 2011 study found that this decline was likely due to competition for the same food, and projected that the Mississippi silverside would replace the brook silverside. Ouachita map turtles, native to the Tennessee River, and Alabama map turtles, native to the Tombigbee River, have each expanded their range into the other river.

Programs have been carried out to mitigate the impact of the Waterway on wildlife, including timber management and reforestation. Thousands of nesting structures have been added for squirrels, birds, and waterfowl, and a waterfowl pond has been created at the Demopolis Wildlife Management Area. The Southeastern Bald Eagle Restoration Project successfully reintroduced the formerly endangered species to Alabama and Mississippi. Neotropical birds, ospreys, eagles, and wading bird rookeries are counted annually.

A 2005 water quality study carried out by the Environmental Protection Agency on both sides of the Mississippi-Alabama border found that invasive species of water hyacinth and bulrush were proliferating to the point that they interfered with navigation. The Corps attempted to control this plant growth by spraying herbicides from planes and boats.

== Recreation ==
In the years after its opening, recreational use of the Waterway for pleasure boating, fishing, and hunting significantly outweighed the commercial uses that had motivated its construction. Additional recreational uses include camping, sightseeing, swimming, and bird watching.

Recreational facilities include seven Class A campgrounds with 750 campsites, 15 day-use areas, five beaches for public swimming, 40 boat ramps, two visitor centers and two environmental education centers, and several private marinas.

In 2001, there were an estimated 3.1 million visitors to the Waterway, a number that was expected to remain fairly stable.

Delta Queen Steamboat Company has offered an annual one-week cruise on the Waterway, with itineraries from Nashville to Mobile and from Mobile to Chattanooga, with stops at the ports of Demopolis and Columbus.

The Agnes Zaiontz Tennessee-Tombigbee Waterway Transportation Museum, which opened in 2006, tells the story of the waterway. In 2019, it was renamed for Agnes Zaiontz, the Authority's longtime office manager, who was instrumental in gathering materials for the museum, development of exhibits, oversight of its construction, and securing its grant funding.

== Geography ==
The waterway is described as having three main parts: the river section, the middle or canal section, and the northern section, also known as the Divide Cut.

=== Divide Cut ===
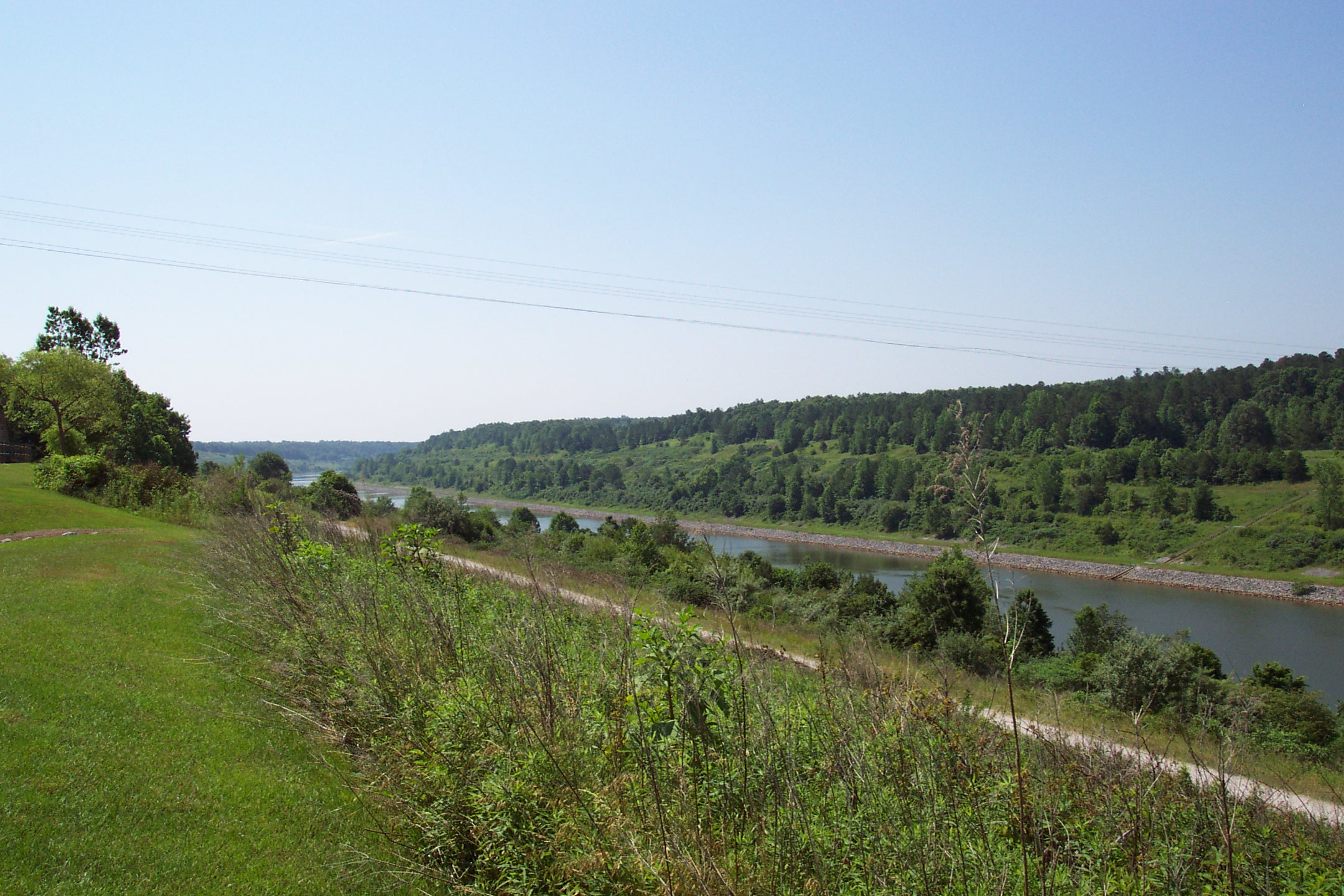
Divide Cut seen from the Holcut Memorial site

The Divide Cut (34°55′0″N 88°14′31″W) is a 29 mi (47 km) canal that makes the connection to the Tennessee River. It connects Pickwick Lake on the Tennessee to Bay Springs Lake, at Mississippi Highway 30. The cut carries the waterway between the Tennessee River watershed, which eventually empties into the Ohio River, and the Tombigbee River watershed, which eventually empties into the Gulf of Mexico at Mobile.

Pickwick Lake is a popular location for water sports such as waterskiing and wakeboarding.

For construction of the Divide Cut, the entire town of Holcut, Mississippi, had to be removed and demolished. Today, the Holcut Memorial lies alongside the waterway on the previous site of the town.

== Governance ==
The Tenn-Tom's Development Authority, which includes a museum dedicated to the waterway's history, is located in Columbus, Mississippi. The Authority is led by 24 individuals: the Governors of Alabama, Kentucky, Mississippi, and Tennessee, plus five gubernatorial appointees from each of those states.

== Locks and dams ==
The waterway is composed of ten locks (listed below from north to south along the waterway); many are named after Southern politicians who supported the project:

- Jamie Whitten Lock and Dam; formerly named Bay Springs Lock and Dam – impounds Bay Springs Lake 34°31′20″N 88°19′30″W
- G. V. Montgomery Lock; formerly named Lock E 34°27′47.06″N 88°21′53.5″W
- John Rankin Lock; formerly named Lock D 34°21′47.1″N 88°24′28.23″W
- Fulton Lock; located in Fulton, Mississippi, formerly named Lock C 34°15′28″N 88°25′29″W
- Glover Wilkins Lock; located in Smithville, Mississippi, formerly named Lock B 34°3′53.54″N 88°25′33.19″W
- Amory Lock; located in Amory, Mississippi, formerly named Lock A 34°00′40″N 88°29′21″W
- Aberdeen Lock and Dam; located in Aberdeen, Mississippi – impounds Aberdeen Lake 33°49′50″N 88°31′11″W
- John C. Stennis Lock and Dam; formerly named Columbus Lock and Dam – impounds Columbus Lake 33°31′5″N 88°29′20″W
- Tom Bevill Lock and Dam; formerly named Aliceville Lock and Dam – impounds Aliceville Lake 33°12′38″N 88°17′16″W
- Howell Heflin Lock and Dam; formerly named Gainesville Lock and Dam – impounds Gainesville Lake 32°50′12.86″N 88°8′8.73″W

== Gallery ==
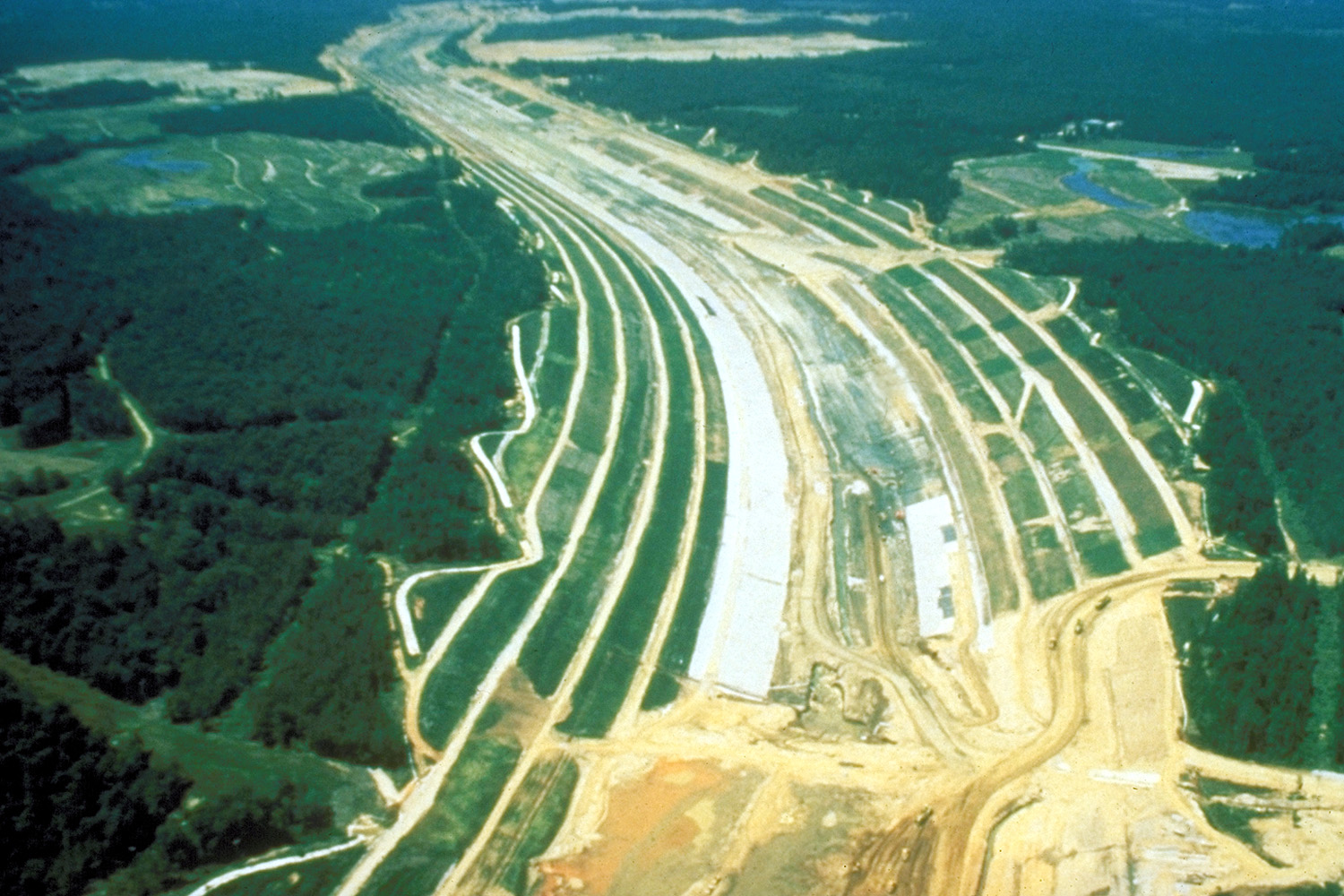
The Divide Cut under construction in the early 1980s

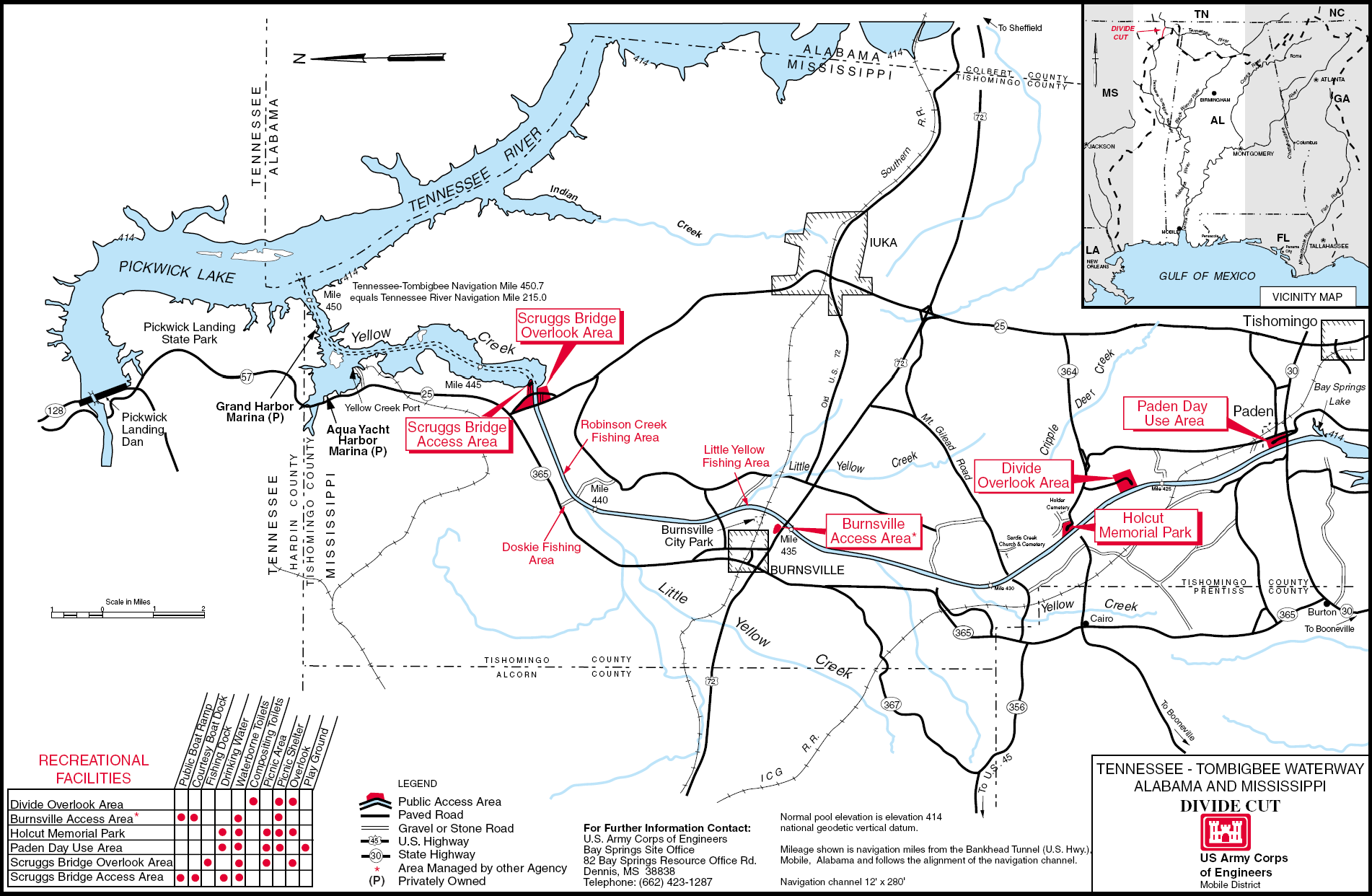
Detailed map of the Divide Cut (Corps of Engineers)

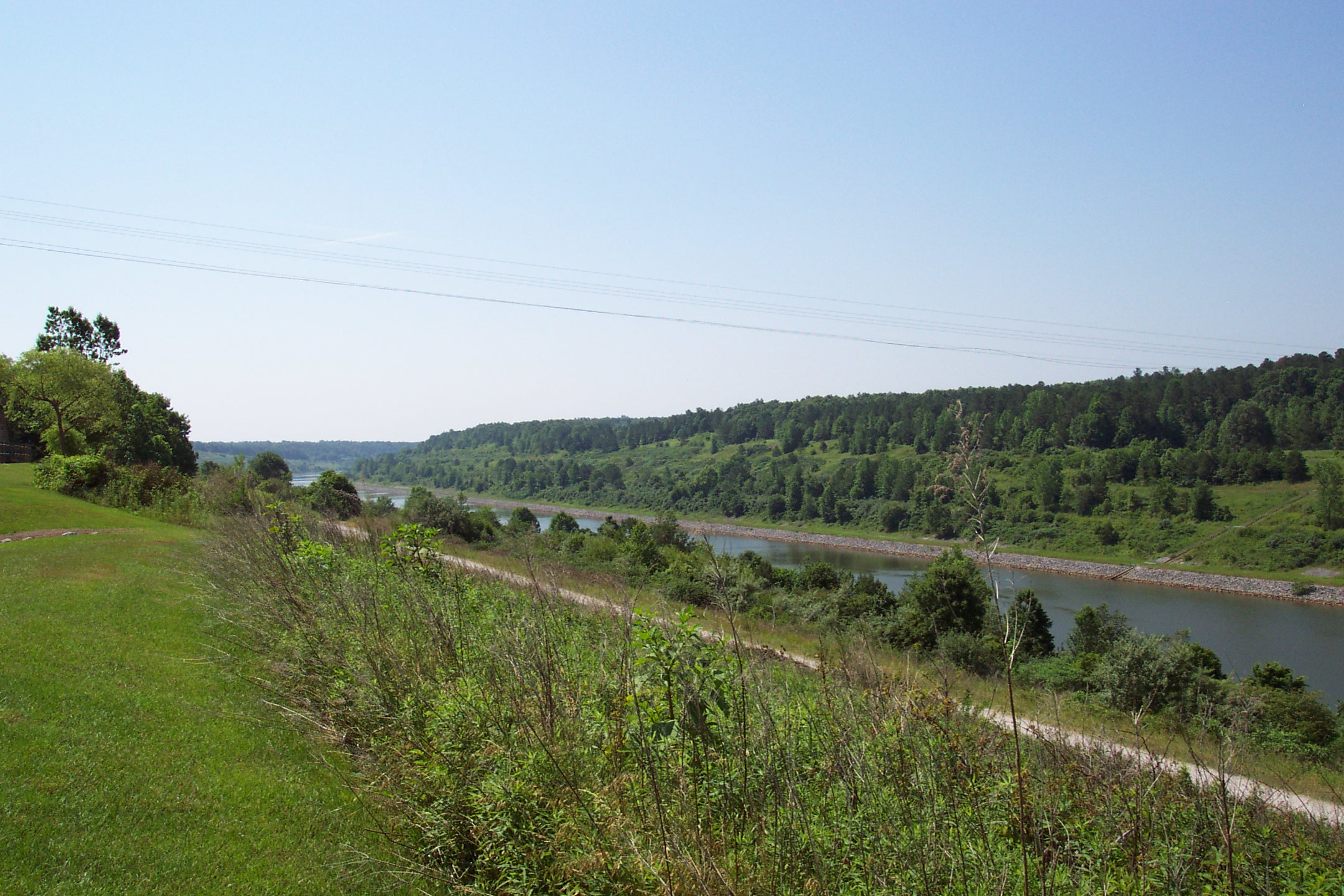
Divide Cut seen from the Holcut Memorial site.

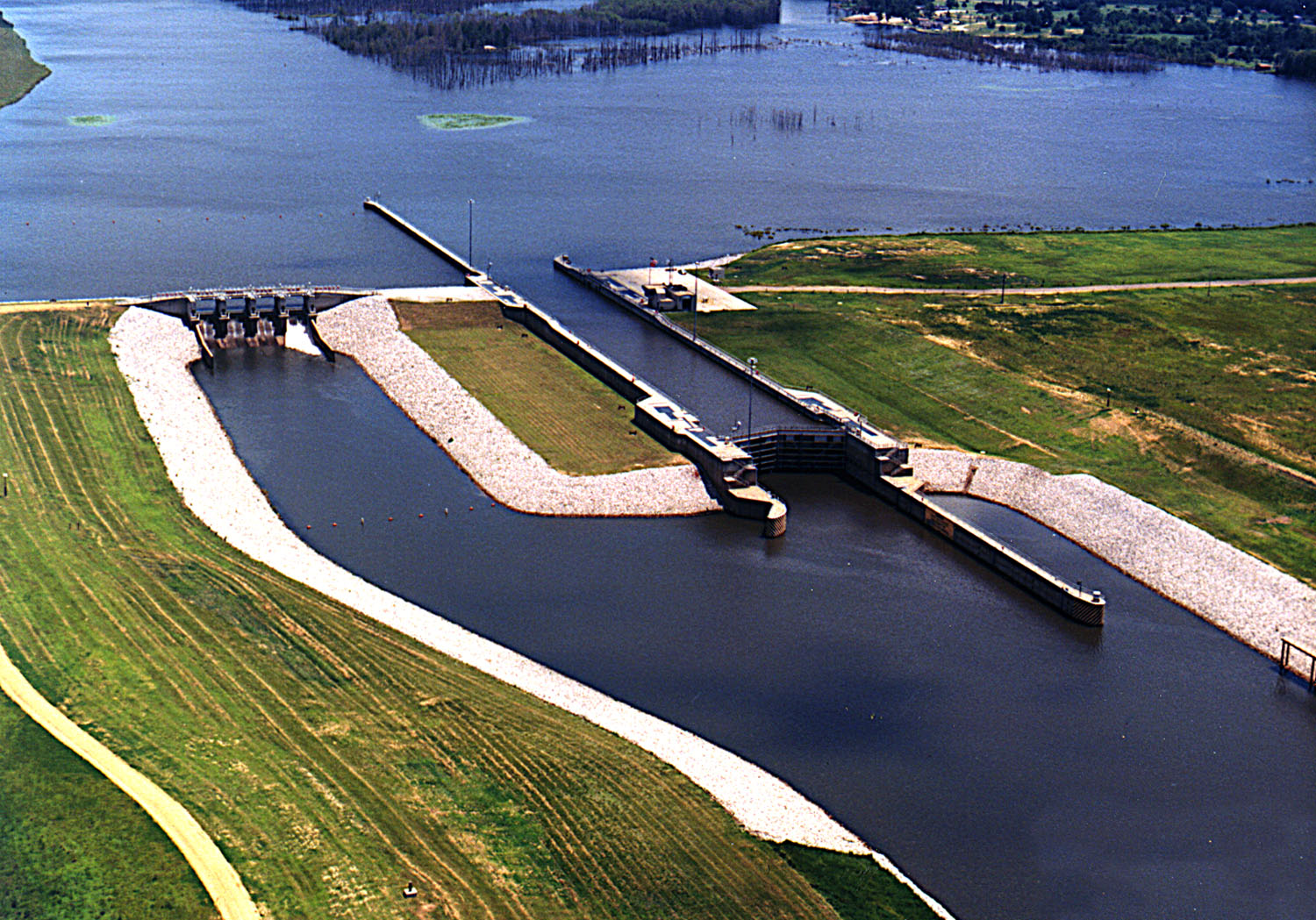
Amory Lock at Amory, Mississippi

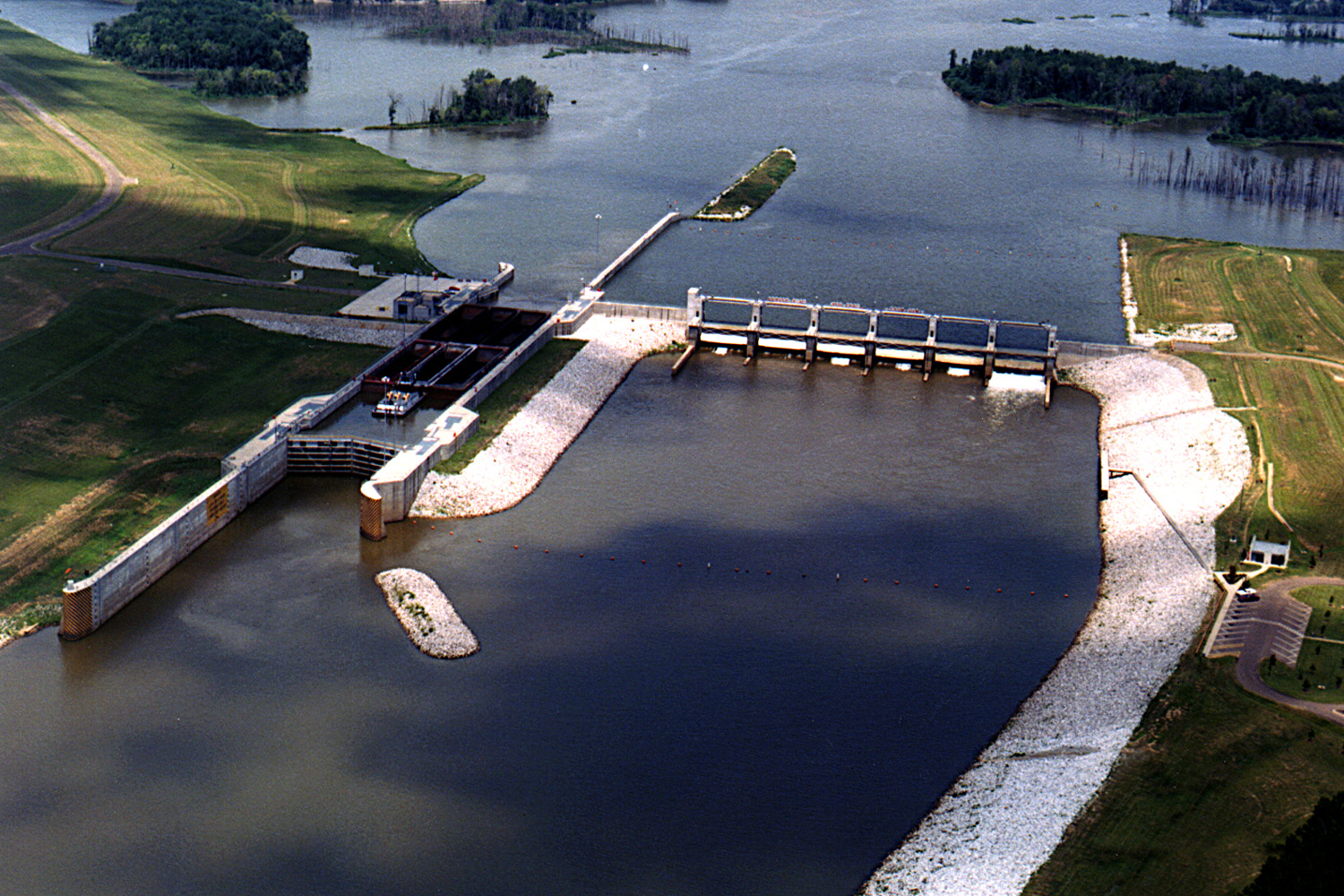
Aberdeen Lock and Dam

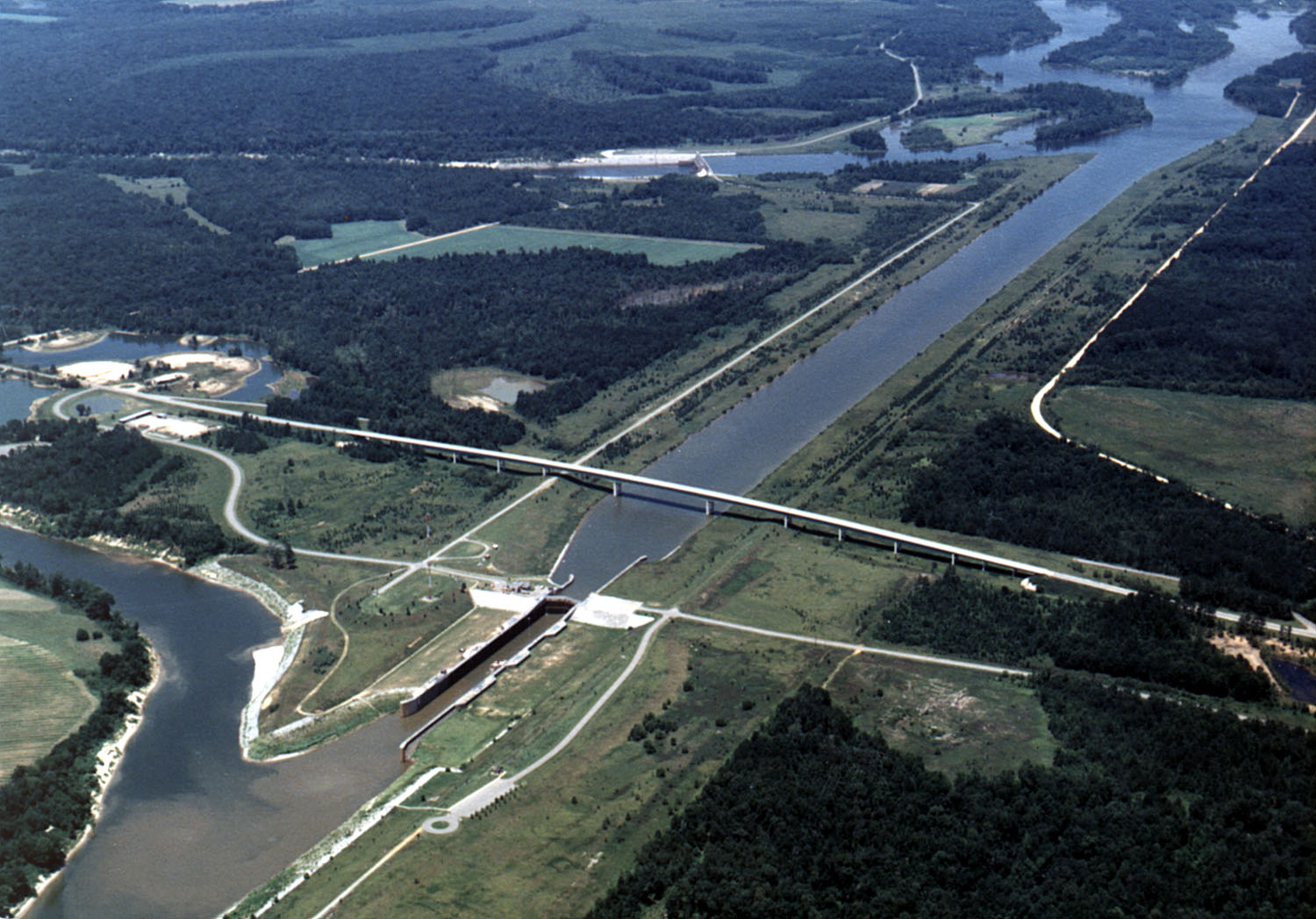
Howell Heflin Lock and Dam

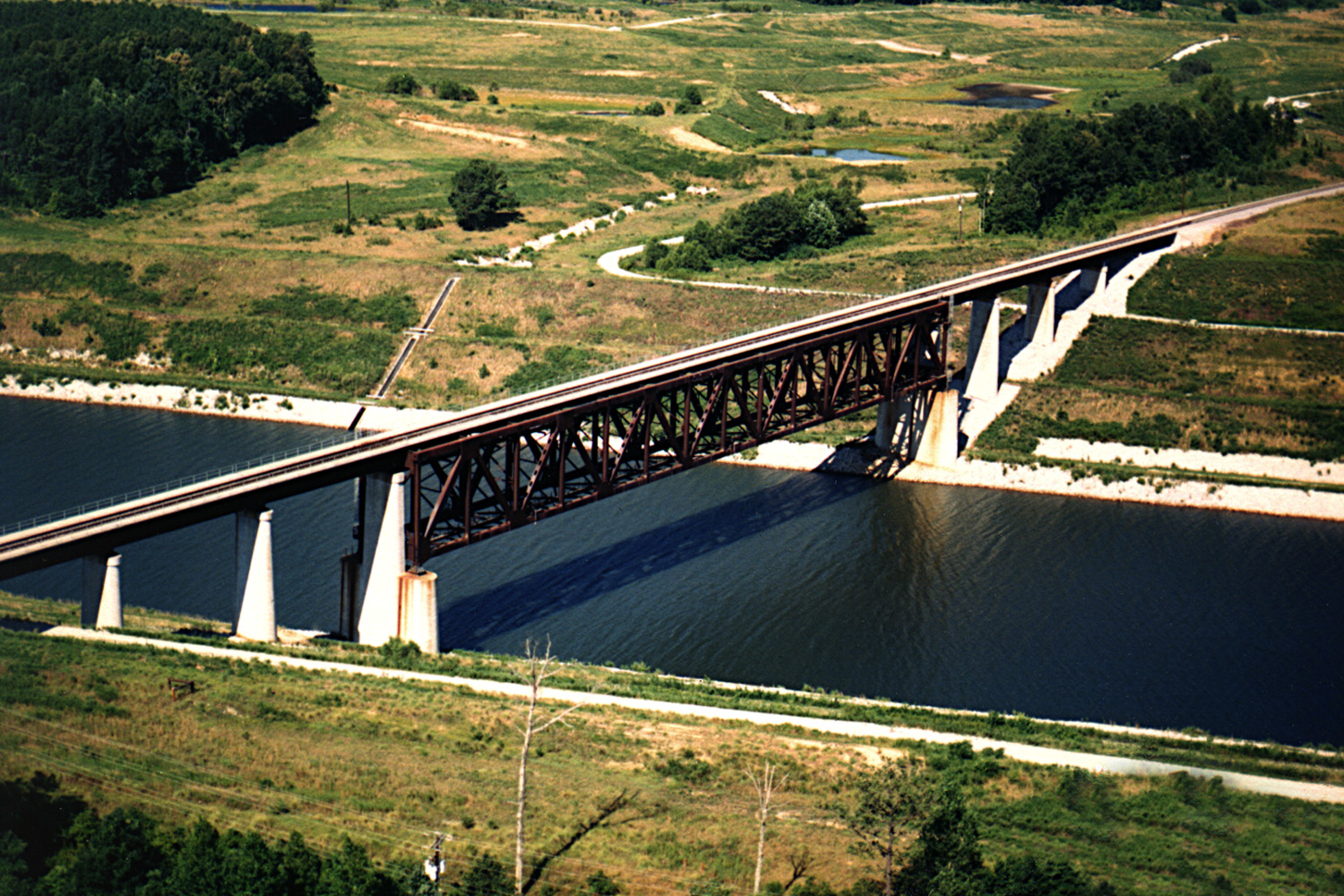
An Illinois Central Railroad (IC) bridge over the waterway at mile 424.8

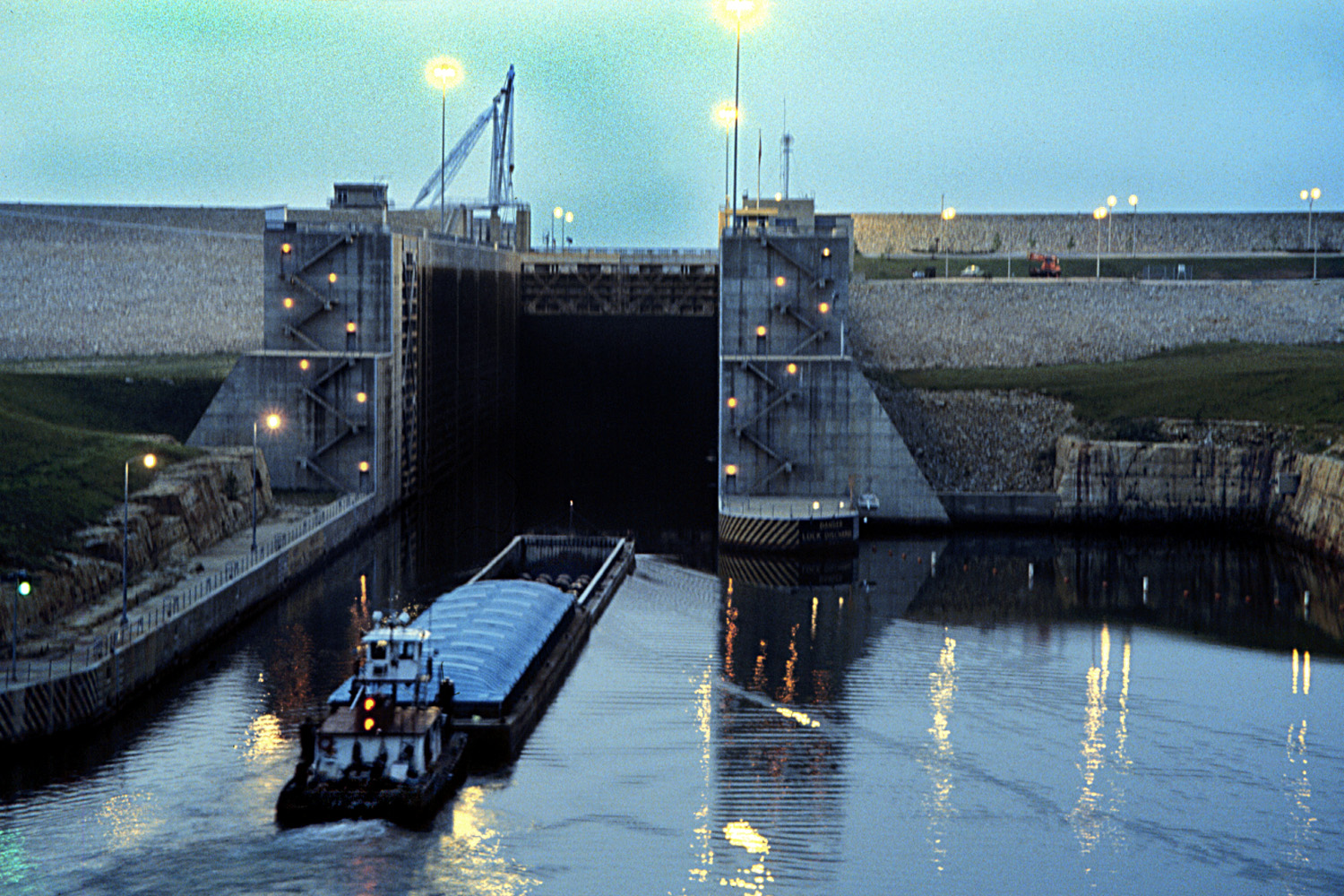
Tow entering Jamie Whitten Lock

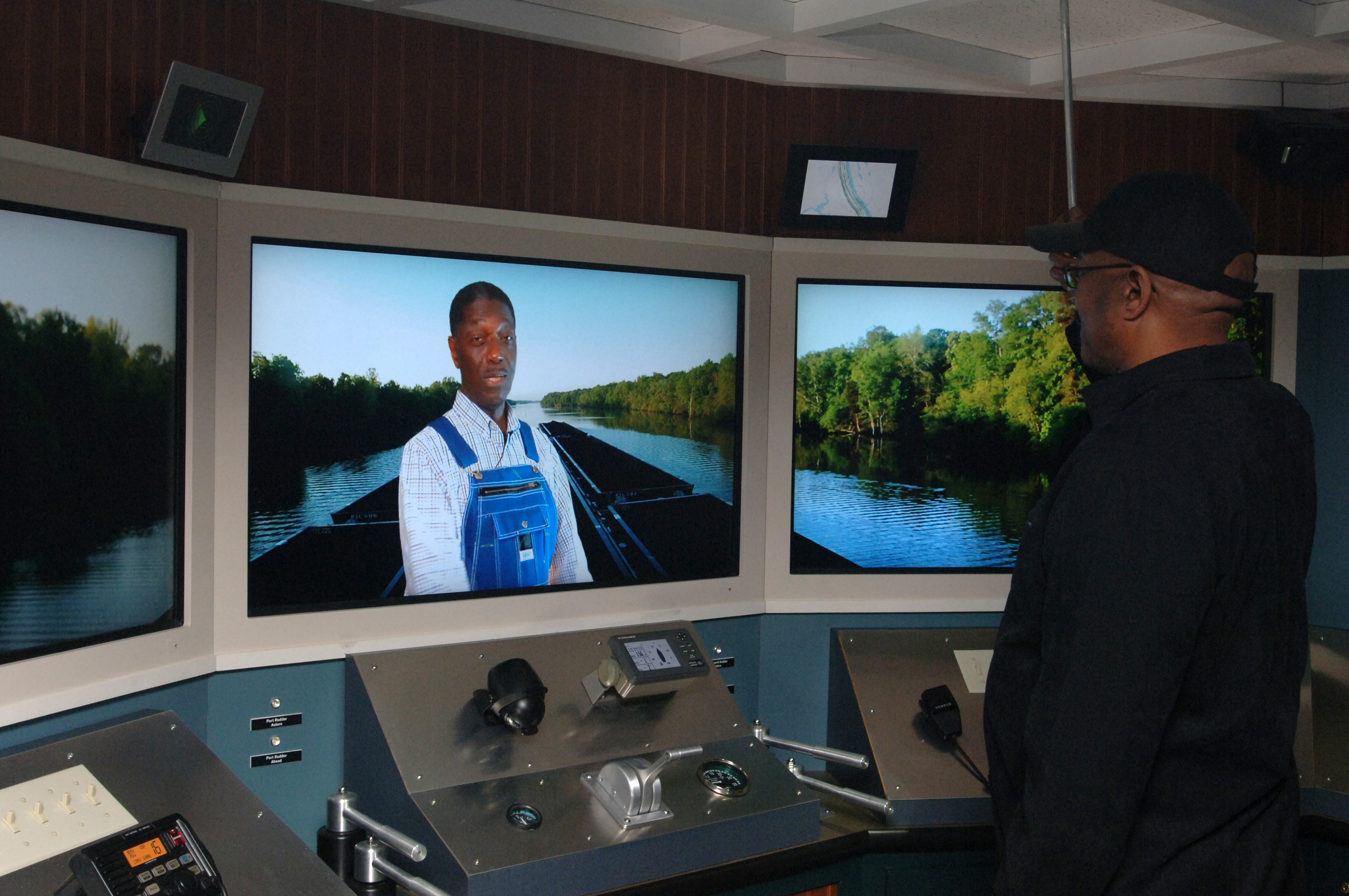
The Agnes Zaiontz Tennessee-Tombigbee Waterway Transportation Museum and Intermodal Learning Center
