= Lock E. Houston =

Mississippi judge and politician

Lock E. Houston

Lock E. Houston (1814 - January 22, 1897) was a judge and state legislator in Mississippi. He served as Speaker of the Mississippi House of Representatives. He served in the Mississippi House during the American Civil War.

He was born in Knox County, Tennessee. His parents died while he was young, he took up blacksmithing to fund his education, graduated from the University of Tennessee, taught in Alabama, studied law, and then settled in Aberdeen, Mississippi.

In 1850 he argued a case before the Mississippi Supreme Court.

In his later life he declined appointment offers to the Mississippi Supreme Court and for nomination as a candidate for a seat in the U.S. Congress.
