= Bay Springs Lake =

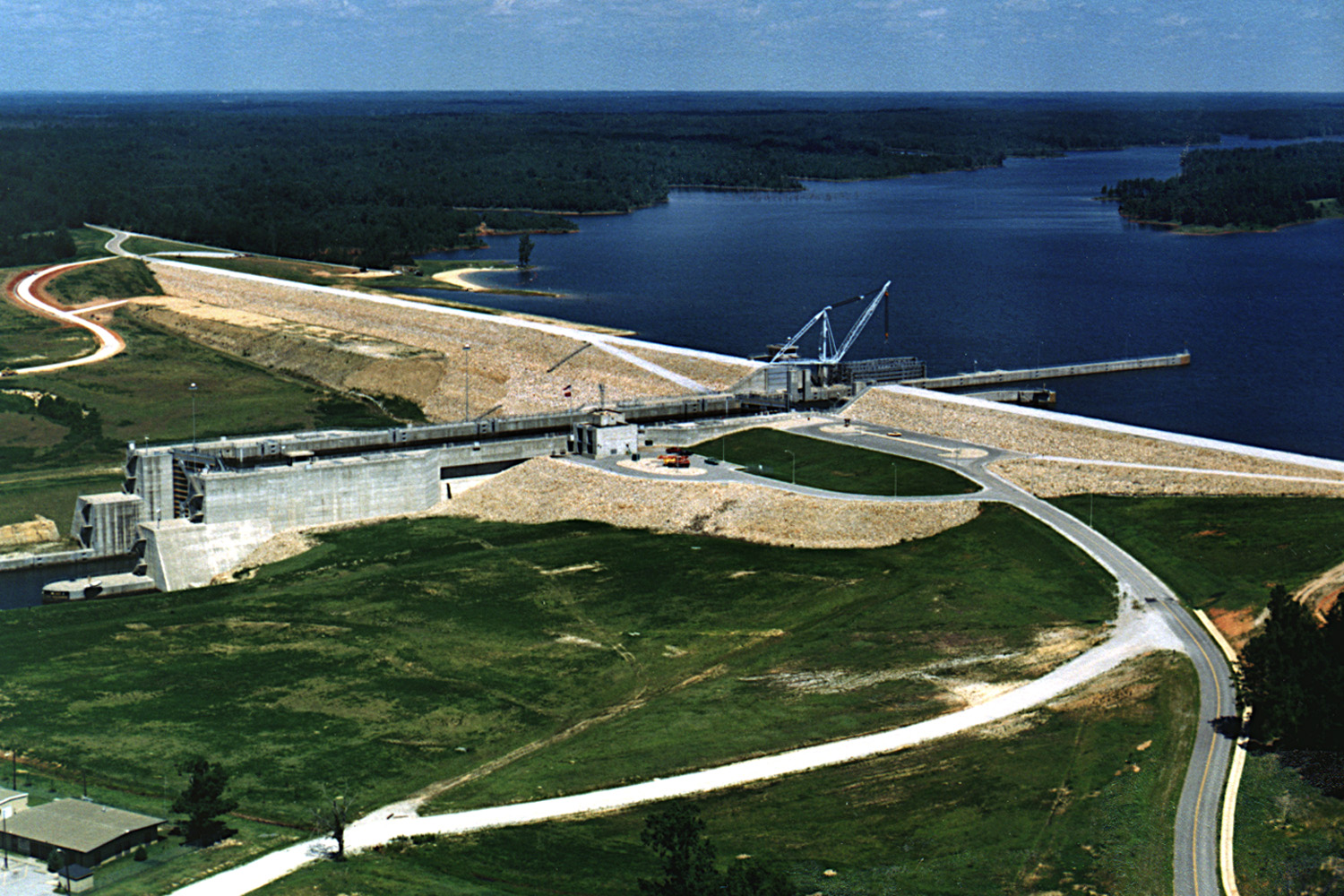
- Jamie Whitten Lock and Dam

- Location within Mississippi Location within the United States
- Location: Tishomingo / Prentiss counties, Mississippi
- Coordinates: 34.5710°N 88.3160°W
- Type: reservoir
- Primary inflows: Tennessee-Tombigbee Waterway
- Primary outflows: Tennessee-Tombigbee Waterway
- Basin countries: United States
- Max. length: 9 mi (14 km) (14 km)
- Surface elevation: 407 ft (124 m)

Bay Springs Lake is a reservoir on the Tennessee-Tombigbee Waterway in the U.S. state of Mississippi. It is impounded by the Jamie Whitten Lock and Dam. The lake is approximately 9 miles (14 km) long, between waterway mile markers 412 at the dam, and 421 near the entrance to the divide cut.
