= Frederick I. Thompson =

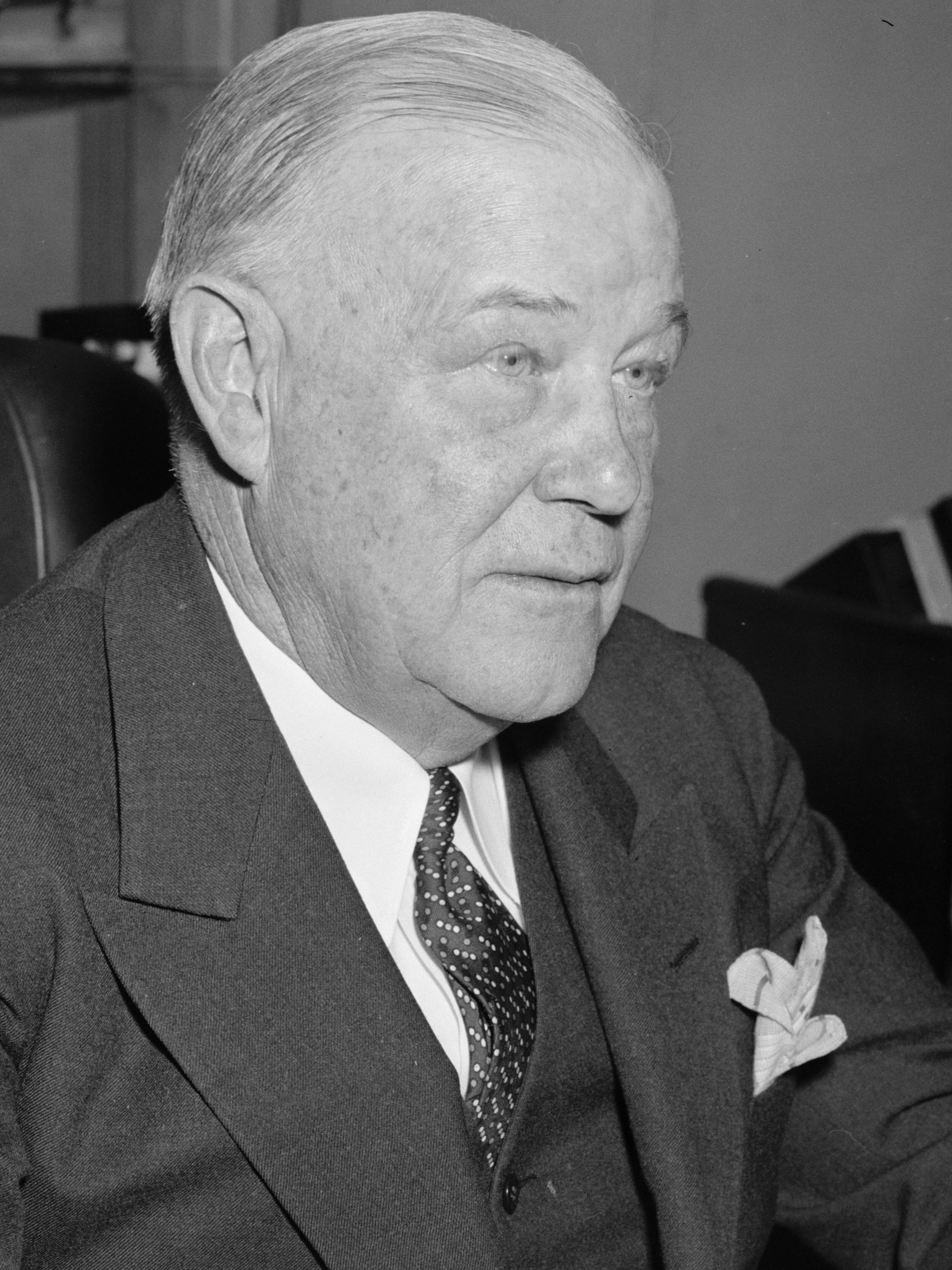
- Thompson shortly after taking office on April 13, 1939

Commissioner of the Federal Communications Commission
- In office April 13, 1939 – June 30, 1941
- President: Franklin D. Roosevelt
- Preceded by: Eugene O. Sykes
- Succeeded by: Clifford Durr

Personal details
- Born: September 29, 1875; Aberdeen, Mississippi
- Died: February 20, 1952 (aged 76); Mobile, Alabama
- Political party: Democratic

Frederick I. Thompson (September 29, 1875 – February 20, 1952) was an American businessman who served as a Commissioner of the Federal Communications Commission from 1939 to 1941.
