= John Rankin Lock =

Waterway building and structure in Mississippi

Coordinates: 34°21′47.1″N 88°24′28.23″W

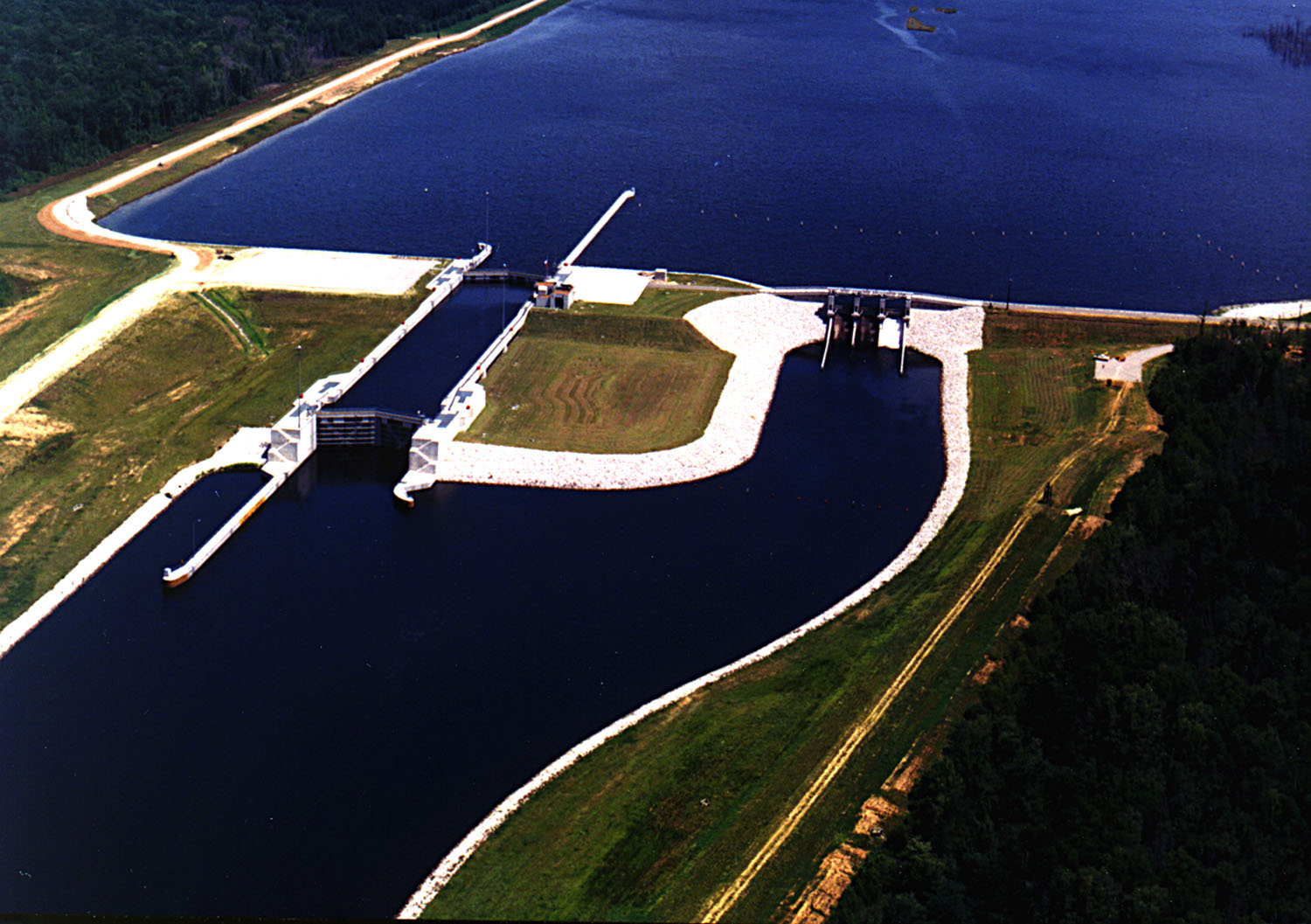
Aerial view of John Rankin Lock and Dam on the Tennessee-Tombigbee Waterway. View is upriver to the north.

The John Rankin Lock (formerly named Lock D) is part of the Tennessee-Tombigbee Waterway (popularly known as the "Tenn-Tom"). It is located in Itawamba County, Mississippi, approximately 6 miles (9.7 km) north of Fulton.

The lock is part of a series of five locks within a stretch of the Tenn-Tom known as the "Chain of lakes" or canal section. The lock has a lift of 30 feet.

Formerly known simply as Lock D, the lock was later renamed for John E. Rankin, a former Mississippi First District Representative in the United States House of Representatives and an early champion of the Tenn-Tom.
