= 805th Pioneer Infantry =

- Country: United States
- Branch: Army
- Type: Pioneer Infantry

The 805th Pioneer Infantry was an all-African American infantry regiment of the United States Army during World War I. The 805th contained black soldiers from the state of Mississippi. The regiment landed in France in July 1918 and served in Europe until July 1919; the regiment saw 39 days of action.

== Entertainment and sports ==
During World War I, the regiment was nicknamed the "Bear Cats." A commander, Colonel Chauncey Benton Humphrey (1872–1958) (USMA 1898), boasted that, among other things, his Bear Cats had "the best Jazz band in France," "the best vaudeville show in the American Expeditionary Forces (AEF), and the best baseball team of any outfit in France."

== Notable personnel ==
- Moses Hardy (1894–2006), Supercentenarian, served in the 805th during World War I
- Billy Higgins (1888–1937), vaudeville comedian, songwriter served in the 805th during World War I, rising to the rank of Color Sergeant
- Joseph D. Patch (1885–1966), commanded the regiment's 1st Battalion from December 1918 to June 1919; major general during World War II

== See also ==
Other segregated, non-white units in the U.S. Armed Forces

- 92nd Infantry Division

- 366th Infantry Regiment

- 93rd Infantry Division

- 185th Brigade (Infantry)

- 369th Infantry Regiment (Harlem Hellfighters)
- 370th Infantry Regiment (The Black Devils)

- 186th Brigade (Infantry)

- 371st Infantry Regiment
- 372nd Infantry Regiment

- Other

- 758th Tank Battalion
- 442nd Infantry Regiment

- 332nd Fighter Group (Tuskegee Airmen)

Related articles

- Racial segregation in the United States Armed Forces
- Desegregation in the United States Marine Corps
- Hispanics in the United States Marine Corps
- Military history of African Americans
- Montford Point Marine Association
- United States Colored Troops
