= Aberdeen School District (Mississippi) =

School district in Mississippi

Location
- 1100 W Commerce St, Aberdeen, Mississippi 39730 Monroe County

District information
- Type: Public school district
- Motto: "Making a Difference"
- Superintendent: Andrea Pastchal-Smith, Ph.D.
- Asst. superintendent(s): Dallas Jones

Students and staff
- Students: 998 (2022-23 school year)
- Teachers: 85.9 (teacher FTE) (2022-23 school year)
- Student–teacher ratio: 15:1

Other information
- Website: https://www.asdms.us

Aberdeen High School

Location
- 205 Highway 145 North; Aberdeen, (Monroe County), Mississippi 39730; United States
- Coordinates: 33.830140°N 88.561832°W

Information
- Type: Public high school
- Motto: "Making A Difference"
- Principal: Tracy Fair
- Staff: 30.16 (FTE)
- Enrollment: 334 (2023-24)
- Student to teacher ratio: 11.07
- Colors: Blue, white and black
- Nickname: Bulldogs

The Aberdeen School District is a public school district based in Aberdeen, Monroe County, Mississippi, United States.

The district includes all of the Aberdeen city limits and some unincorporated areas.

== Schools ==
- Aberdeen High School (grades 9–12)
- Belle-Shivers Middle School (grades 5-8)
- Aberdeen Elementary School (grades PK-4)
- Aberdeen Learning Center

== Demographics ==
=== 2006-07 school year ===
There were a total of 1,594 students enrolled in the Aberdeen School District during the 2006–2007 school year. The gender makeup of the district was 48% female and 52% male. The racial makeup of the district was 93.41% African American, 5.33% White, 0.82% Hispanic, and 0.44% Asian. 89.5% of the district's students were eligible to receive free lunch.

=== Previous school years ===
School year	Enrollment	Gender makeup		Racial makeup					Female	Male	Asian	African American	Hispanic	Native American	White
School year	Enrollment	2019-20													
2018-19															
2017-18															
2016-17															
2015-16															
2014-15															
2013-14															
2012-13															
2011-12															
2010-11															
2009-10															
2008-09															
2007-08															
2006-07															
2005-06	1,649	48%	52%	0.42%	93.57%	0.55%	0.12%	5.34%							
2004-05	1,697	49%	51%	0.18%	92.52%	0.24%	–	7.07%							
2003-04	1,667	49%	51%	0.12%	90.88%	0.42%	0.12%	8.46%							
2002-03	1,798	49%	51%	0.17%	89.38%	0.39%	0.17%	9.90%							

== Accountability statistics ==
	2006-07	2005-06	2004-05	2003-04	2002-03
District accreditation status	Accredited	Accredited	Accredited	Accredited	Accredited
School performance classifications
Level 5 (Superior Performing) Schools	0	0	0	0	0
Level 4 (Exemplary) Schools	1	1	1	1	1
Level 3 (Successful) Schools	3	3	4	4	4
Level 2 (Under Performing) Schools	1	1	0	0	0
Level 1 (Low Performing) Schools	0	0	0	0	0
Not assigned	1	1	1	1	1

== See also ==
- List of school districts in Mississippi
