= Rozzell Sykes =

Rozzell Sykes (December 25, 1931 – December 18, 1994) was an American artist, based in Los Angeles, California. He is best known as the founder of St. Elmo Village, an urban renewal project.

== Early life ==
Rozzell Sykes was born in Aberdeen, Mississippi, the son of Anna Bell Clay and Cleveland Sykes, although he gave various accounts of his origins over the years, frequently mentioning a childhood in the West Indies. He lived in St. Louis, Missouri and San Diego, California before moving to Los Angeles in 1961.

== Career ==
In the mid-1960s, Rozzell Sykes was a working painter, noted for a series featured in Life magazine. In 1969, he and his nephew Roderick Sykes acquired a small group of bungalows in mid-city Los Angeles, in the 4800 block of St. Elmo Drive where they lived, to save the dwellings and develop the neighborhood as a creative experiment. St. Elmo Village was incorporated in 1971, and showcased the Sykes' vision of a colorful, multi-ethnic cultural space. Rozzell Sykes executed several large murals for the community, and secured funding through the assistance of Tom Bradley, then a city councilman. "I don't think he allowed anything to go unpainted," said Bradley in 1995. "He was a man of uncommon vision. He often said it didn't matter whether you lived in a shoe box or a mansion, you can be all you want to be." The neighborhood became the site of the annual St. Elmo Festival, organized by Rozzell Sykes to bring attention to the project and celebrate the arts.

Roderick and Rozzell Sykes received a Human Rights Award from the Baha'is of Los Angeles County in 1971, in observance of United Nations Human Rights Day, for their work in St. Elmo Village.

== Personal life and legacy ==
He was married to Erma Sykes, a nurse, and the couple raised five children together, among them music producer Benny Medina.

He died in late 1994, age 63. His funeral was held at First African Methodist Episcopal Church of Los Angeles. St. Elmo Village remains active as an arts space, under director Roderick Sykes.
