= Greatest Hits (Ray Parker Jr. album) =

Greatest hits album by Ray Parker Jr.
- Released: 1982
- Label: Arista
- Producer: Ray Parker Jr.

Ray Parker Jr. chronology
The Other Woman (1982)	Greatest Hits (1982)	Woman Out of Control (1983)

Greatest Hits is a compilation album by the American musician Ray Parker Jr., released in 1982 on Arista Records. The album peaked at No. 17 on the US Billboard Top Soul LPs chart and No. 51 on the US Billboard Top LPs and Tape chart.

== Critical reception ==
Professional ratings
Review scores
Source	Rating
AllMusic	3/5 stars

AllMusic's Andy Kellman, in a 3/5-star review, exclaimed "While it does include the big hits ('You Can't Change That', 'A Woman Needs Love (Just Like You Do)', 'Jack and Jill', 'That Old Song'), it's hardly definitive since it misses out on a lot of strong album-based material. Once we truly entered the CD age, a number of anthologies came around that were more in-depth (if as flawed) than this one."

== Track listing ==
No.	Title	Writer(s)	Length
1.	"The Other Woman"	Ray Parker, Jr.	4:03
2.	"You Can't Change That"	Ray Parker Jr.	3:22
3.	"Is This a Love Thing"	Ray Parker Jr.	4:10
4.	"A Woman Needs Love (Just Like You Do)"	Ray Parker Jr.	3:56
5.	"Jack and Jill"	Ray Parker Jr.	4:34
6.	"Bad Boy"	Ray Parker Jr.	4:10
7.	"Two Places at the Same Time"	Ray Parker Jr.	3:49
8.	"For Those Who Like to Groove"	Ray Parker Jr.	4:28
9.	"That Old Song"	Ray Parker Jr.	4:07
10.	"The People Next Door"	Ray Parker Jr.	4:26

== Charts ==
Chart (1983)	Peak position
US Billboard 200	51

Chart (2026)	Peak position
Canadian Albums (Billboard)	96
