= Chartbusters (Ray Parker Jr. album) =

Compilation album by Ray Parker Jr.
- Released: 1984
- Label: Arista
- Producer: Ray Parker Jr.

Ray Parker Jr. chronology
Woman Out of Control (1983)	Chartbusters (1984)	Sex and the Single Man (1985)

Chartbusters is a compilation album by the American musician Ray Parker Jr., released in 1984 on Arista Records. This album was certified Gold in the United States by the RIAA.

== Critical reception ==
Professional ratings
Review scores
Source	Rating
AllMusic	3/5 stars

AllMusic's Ron Wynn, in a 3/5 star review, called Chartbusters "A good anthology covering the pop/soul hits of Ray Parker, Jr. as a solo artist."

== Track listing ==
All tracks are written by Ray Parker, Jr..

Chartbusters track listing
No.	Title	Length
1.	"Jamie"	4:12
2.	"Ghostbusters" (Extended Version)	6:09
3.	"The Other Woman"	4:04
4.	"I've Been Diggin You"	3:58
5.	"Christmas Time Is Here"	3:00
6.	"A Woman Needs Love"	4:03
7.	"I Still Can't Get Over Loving You"	4:07
8.	"Woman Out of Control"	4:13
9.	"Invasion"	7:28
