= Love On Top =

2011 single by Beyoncé

Single by Beyoncé

from the album 4
- Released: September 12, 2011
- Recorded: 2011
- Studio: MSR Studios, New York City; Real World Studios, Box, Wiltshire
- Genre: R&B
- Length: 4:27
- Label: Columbia
- Songwriters: Beyoncé Knowles; Terius Nash; Shea Taylor
- Producers: Knowles; Taylor

Beyoncé singles chronology
"Party" (2011)	"Love On Top" (2011)	"Countdown" (2011)

Music video
- "Love On Top" on YouTube

"Love On Top" is a song recorded by American singer Beyoncé for her fourth studio album 4 (2011). Inspired by her state of mind while playing Etta James in the 2008 musical biopic Cadillac Records, Beyoncé wrote the song alongside Terius Nash and Shea Taylor; its production was handled by Taylor and Beyoncé. A throw-back to 1980s music, the uptempo R&B song exhibits style similar to that of Stevie Wonder, Huey Lewis, Whitney Houston, Janet Jackson and the Jackson 5, among others. While incorporating four key changes, Beyoncé adopts a high range when repeating the song's chorus towards the end of the song. She sings about a person whom she can always call, even after facing grief and hard work from them, until finally they put her first.

The song's musical composition, as well as Beyoncé's vocals and versatility, positively surprised critics. Beyoncé sang "Love On Top" live at 2011 MTV Video Music Awards, announcing her pregnancy at the end of her performance. This caused the upsurge of the song on several charts worldwide. It reached the top ten in Hungary, and the top twenty in Australia, Italy, New Zealand and the United Kingdom. It also debuted and peaked at number 20 on the US Billboard Hot 100 chart, thus becoming the second highest debut of Beyoncé's career as a solo artist. "Love On Top" remained at number one on the US Hot R&B/Hip-Hop Songs chart for seven consecutive weeks, and has sold over one million copies. It was the bestselling R&B song of 2012 in the US. Beyoncé won a Grammy Award for Best Traditional R&B Performance for "Love On Top" at the 55th ceremony.

Mainly inspired by the work of the American band New Edition, the accompanying music video for "Love On Top" shows Beyoncé along with five male dancers, performing choreographed moves in a penthouse studio in New York City overlooking the Hudson River towards New Jersey. Critics generally commended the simplicity of the video, the wardrobe changes with every key change, and Beyoncé's youthful exuberance throughout the clip. The song was part of the singer's set lists on the residency shows 4 Intimate Nights with Beyoncé (2011) and Revel Presents: Beyoncé Live (2012), as well as The Mrs. Carter Show World Tour (2013–14), The Formation World Tour (2016), the Renaissance World Tour (2023) and the Cowboy Carter Tour (2025).

== Background and development ==
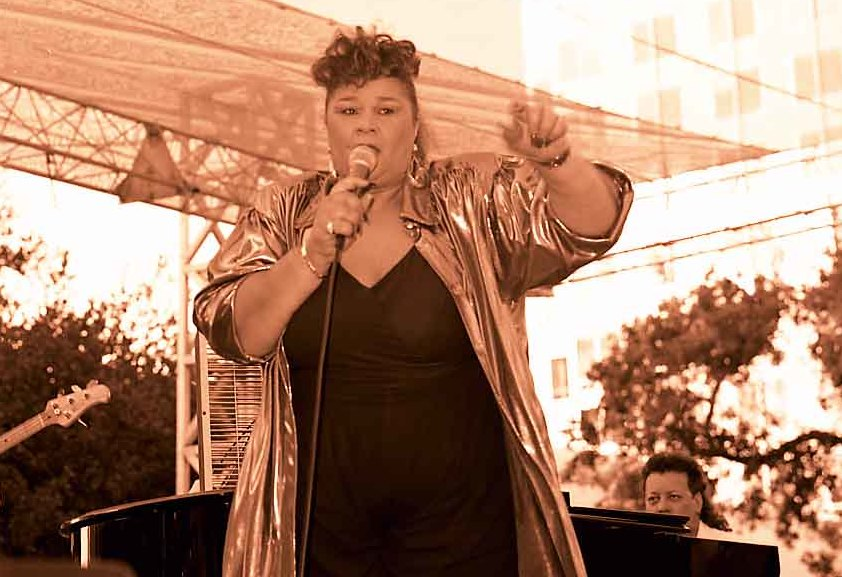
Playing Etta James (pictured) motivated Beyoncé for the development of "Love On Top".

"Love On Top" was written by Beyoncé, Terius Nash and Shea Taylor while production was handled by Beyoncé and Taylor. From June 16 to 27, 2011, the songs from 4 were available to listen to in full each day on Beyoncé's official website, paired with its accompanying photo spread from the album packaging and a quote. On June 26, 2011, "Love On Top" was the eighth song to be chosen. The quote found Beyoncé elaborating on the song's inspiration:

"When I played Etta James [in Cadillac Records] it was the most I'd learned about myself until the recording of this album. When I went into the studio I used the same passion, honesty, and approach with my vocals I channeled as Etta James. It does not sound like the vocals on my past albums. It's a lot rawer. It comes from a deep place."

Beyoncé, who has covered "At Last" which is a song originally recorded by James, portrayed the artist in the 2008 musical biopic, Cadillac Records and won critical acclaim for her portrayal. She told Billboard magazine: "I realized that Etta James was so unapologetic, bold and strong that playing her was a big risk for me. It gave me the confidence and the push to challenge myself a little more with my music." "Love On Top" impacted Urban radio in the United States on January 10, 2012, as the fourth single from the album in that country.

== Composition ==
"Love On Top" is an up-tempo 1980s R&B song. It exhibits elements of retro-soul music, retro-pop, 1980s pop music, funk music, jazz, and 1970s classic disco music, as stated by Joanne Dorken of MTV UK, Cameron Adams of the Herald Sun and Thomas Conner of Chicago Sun-Times. According to Slant Magazine's Eric Henderson, "Love On Top" is a "bright, breezy tribute to the freshness of mid-[19]80s, pre-new-jack-FM R&B reminiscent of Whitney Houston and Anita Baker." He also said the song was the "perfect and totally inverted fraternal twin" of another song on 4, being "Rather Die Young". "Love On Top"'s retro elements are further illustrated by its use of finger snaps, a "distorted" bass groove, and a melding of horns as well as sweet backing harmonies, especially in the bridge and the chorus of the song. It is instrumentally complete with a thumping bassline, synthesizers, tribal drums, an electric piano, a guitar, a peppy saxophone, and some backing vocals. Rich Juzwiak of The Village Voice compared "Love On Top" to Raydio's "You Can't Change That" (1979) and New Edition's "Mr. Telephone Man" (1984). Priya Elan of NME noted that "Love On Top" echoes Janet Jackson's "Whoops Now" (1995), Lionel Richie's "Dancing on the Ceiling" (1986) and the theme from My Two Dads.

"Love On Top"
As Beyoncé repeats the chorus of "Love On Top", she continuously raises key into a rarely used high range.

According to the digital sheet music published at Musicnotes.com by EMI Music Publishing, "Love On Top" is mainly written in the key of C major with a tempo of 99.2 beats per minute. Beyoncé's vocal range in the song spans from the low note of G_{3} to the high note of B_{5}. "Love On Top" is set as "both a sweet love song and an expression of girl power" as stated by Georgette Cline of AOL Music. Genevieve Koski of The A.V. Club and David Amidon of PopMatters noted that "Love On Top" features "mature lyrics" alongside Beyoncé "sounding vocally giddy and aggressive while portraying the message." Lyrically, the song finds Beyoncé as the female protagonist expressing the happiness she feels to have her love interest in her life. "The languid, synth-soul smoocher" allows for an "enjoyably euphoric tone" before she chimes in with "Bring the beat in!", introducing "a mid-album interlude of mid-[19]80s pop", as stated by Andy Gill of The Independent as well as Hamish MacBain of NME.

Rich Juzwiak noted that Beyoncé "ecstatically and hyperactively" changes keys four times during the song. As stated by Scott Shetler of PopCrush, she constantly sings praises of her love interest in the first verse where she also seemingly sends him subtle digs as he did not give her his full attention in the past, this being illustrated in lyrics such as, "after fighting through my fears [...] finally you've put me first." The chorus, complemented with sweet backing harmonies, then arrives, with Beyoncé chanting, "Baby it's you, you're the one I love / You're the one I need / You're the only one I see / Come on baby it's you / You're the one that gives your all / You're the one I can always call / When I need you make everything stop / Finally you put my love on top." The chorus carries the final two minutes of the song through four key changes, ascending chromatically from C major to D♭ major, then to D major, then to E♭ major before finally finishing in E major. This was highlighted by Henderson who wrote that "the spirit carries both her and the song into a Stevie Wonder-reminiscent climax of continually rising key changes." In this way, the word "baby" is said about 24 times throughout the song. As soon as the synthesizers drop out, the song fades out almost instantaneously.

== Critical reception ==
"Love On Top" was highly acclaimed by critics. Rich Juzwiak of The Village Voice complimented its "easy listening/easier dancing boogie vibe". Genevieve Koski of The A.V. Club said "Love On Top" had an up-tempo nature, saying that it was possibly the only "first-listen earworm" on the album with its "breezy, retro-soul style." Matthew Horton of BBC joked about the climax of the song, stating that the album 4 "was named after the four key changes in the final, teetering chorus of 'Love on Top' to ram the point home." Greg Kot of the Chicago Tribune commended the song for putting a "bounce" in Beyoncé's step. Similarly, Matthew Perpetua of Rolling Stone named "Love On Top" "a blast" as Beyoncé creates a modern take on old-school Whitney Houston. Hamish MacBain of NME favored the song's up-tempo style, stating that it was much needed after the "ballad-heavy" first half of the album. Priya Elan of the same publication commented that it has "100 watt smile lyrics". Stating that "Love On Top" is reminiscent of 1980s R&B, Erika Ramirez of Billboard magazine complimented the song as a "Halcyon love song, perfect to be whisked away to". Spence D. of IGN commented that Beyoncé's "cheery disposition" and the "brash horns" will remind listeners of "damn good" mid-1980s R&B can be. While including the song as a "must hear" from the album, Andy Gill of The Independent named "Love On Top" as "a small footnote to Stevie Wonder's innovatory genius." Alexis Petridis of The Guardian praised Beyoncé's vocals and called "Love On Top" a "well-written" song.

Eric Henderson of Slant Magazine also gave "Love On Top" a positive review, favoring its "infectious upbeat spirit" and comparing it to the styling of Stevie Wonder, Anita Baker and Whitney Houston. He also complimented the fact that the various key changes throughout the song "force Beyoncé out of her scold range and into some winningly girlish soprano whoops." Similarly, Joey Guerra of the Houston Chronicle commented that "Love On Top" is a "bouncy jam" which finds Beyoncé in "feel-good diva mode". He added that it might have turned up on early albums from Natalie Cole, Whitney Houston or Mariah Carey. Guerra concluded that Beyoncé "rarely has sounded so charming, even as she soars through several key changes." Mikael Wood of Spin magazine noted that the song "imagines a perfect genetic splice" of Whitney Houston's eponymous debut album and Michael Jackson's Off the Wall. Ricky Schweitzer of One Thirty BPM stated that "Love On Top" is instantaneously reminiscent of Michael Jackson, Janet Jackson and Stevie Wonder, and favored Beyoncé's numerous key changes, writing:

'Love On Top' employs a similar pacing [to 'Party'], though tonally, this track reminds one more immediately of Michael and Janet Jackson, as well as Stevie Wonder. This effervescent throwback escapes corniness by reveling in its pure joy and as such, it becomes one of the highlights of the album. The numerous key changes that flood the end of the song could seem masturbatory, but Beyoncé is not proving that she can sing as high as Mariah [Carey] or Whitney [Houston] because we already trust her to. It is energy and not ego that drives the constantly rising progression.

Conrad Tao of Sputnikmusic very much liked "Love On Top", writing: "[...] as she forces herself into a rarely used high range, she sets for a perfect catharsis for the burgeoning sexual passions of the album's first two thirds", and describing the outcome as "absolutely magnificent". Melinda Newman of HitFix commented "the soulful, exuberant, mid-tempo finger snapper, 'Love on Top' is deliciously sunny and sweet." James Reed of The Boston Globe wrote that "Love On Top" sounds "like the pretty young thing of Michael Jackson's 'P.Y.T.' grew up to make a sequel to that 1983 hit." Similarly, Joanne Dorken of MTV UK who described "Love On Top" as "scream[ing] 'classic disco', catchy, [being] more uptempo and differing from the rest of the album", concluded that the song shows Beyoncé's versatility and that it is "very Jackson 5". Ben Cardew of Music Week stated that "Love On Top" is summery and "laidback, rather than massively immediate". However, he added that it proves to be a grower as it "ratchets up the key changes on the final third", further writing that Beyoncé's voice sounds "particularly impressive". A mixed review came from Adam Markovitz of Entertainment Weekly, who compared Beyoncé's work on "Love On Top" to that of past idols such as Luther Vandross and Diana Ross, but felt the tone overshadowed her style, stating "she gets lost in her idols' polyester-swathed shadows." Jon Caramanica of The New York Times noted that the song was "slinky but nowhere near sexy" adding that it sounds like a song young Brandy Norwood would release.

=== Recognition and accolades ===
James Montgomery of MTV News placed "Love On Top" at number nine on his list of the 25 Best Songs Of 2011. He called it "a throwback jam" to Beyoncé's older R&B material, stating that "[it's] big, bold, brassy and blissed-out, [and] it represents everything B was going for on her 4 album". Montgomery also noted that the song was an "absolute lifesaver" and "as is the case with all of her best tunes, Beyoncé belts here". Slant Magazine's staff members listed "Love On Top" as the 24th best song of the year, with Eric Henderson commenting that "somewhere between [4's] copious ballads and its few, hyperventilating dance tracks, Beyoncé strikes a perfect balance with this breezy midtempo tribute to the 1980s." On The Village Voice's Pazz & Jop critic year-end list in 2011, "Love On Top" was ranked at number 51. Additionally, Nick Murray of the same publication included the song on his list of 53 Great Songs From 2011.

"Love On Top" was named the greatest song of the decade (2010s) by Harper's Bazaar, and the best song by a female artist of the decade by Uproxx. In 2017, ShortList's Dave Fawbert listed "Love On Top" as containing "one of the greatest key changes in music history". In 2024, Rolling Stone named the record the 14th best R&B song of the 21st century.

The song was nominated in the category for Viewer's Choice at the 2012 BET Awards and in the category for R&B/Hip-Hop Song at the 2012 Teen Choice Awards. Beyoncé won her 17th Grammy Award with Best Traditional R&B Performance for "Love On Top" at the 55th Annual Grammy Awards. At the 26th ASCAP Rhythm & Soul Music Awards in 2013, "Love On Top" received the Top R&B/Hip-Hop Song award.

== Chart performance ==
For the week July 2, 2011, "Love On Top" debuted on the South Korea Gaon International Singles Chart at number 3, selling 89,942 digital downloads. The song remained at that position in its second and third week, selling 52,462 downloads and 42,261 downloads respectively. It charted inside the top ten positions of the chart for five consecutive weeks.

After Beyoncé's performance of "Love On Top" at the 2011 MTV Video Music Awards, the song was propelled into the top five positions of the US iTunes Store; its sales picked up by 221 percent. Despite not being a single at that time, it became the highest-charting song from 4 on the US iTunes Store. For the week ending September 10, 2011, "Love On Top" consequently debuted at number 135 on the US Hot Digital Songs chart, and charted at number 22 on the US Bubbling Under Hot 100 Singles chart. The following week, the song was number 10 on the Hot Digital Songs chart, selling 113,000 downloads; digital sales went up by 803%. "Love On Top" entered the US Hot 100 chart at number 20. The Hot 100 debut of "Love On Top" became Beyoncé's second highest entry; after "Ring the Alarm" which entered at number 12 in 2006. "Love On Top", however, fell to number 70 on the Hot 100 chart on September 24, 2011. Approximately eleven years later, the song was certified 5× platinum by the Recording Industry Association of America (RIAA) on August 8, 2022. The song passed one million digital copies in the U.S. in February 2013.

For the week September 17, 2011, "Love On Top" debuted at number 85 on the US Hot R&B/Hip-Hop Songs chart. It moved to number 9 on the Hot R&B/Hip-Hop Songs chart issue dated February 11, 2012, and became the third song from 4 to chart inside the top ten of that chart. For the week ending March 3, 2012, the song earned the Greatest Gainer/Airplay title as it lifted from number 4 to number 2 on the Hot R&B/Hip-Hop Songs chart with 30 million audience impressions, which went up by 22%, according to Nielsen BDS. "Love On Top" topped the chart for the week ending March 10, 2012; it was Beyoncé's sixth song during her solo career to reach number one on the Hot R&B/Hip-Hop Songs chart. It spent six consecutive weeks on the top of the chart. Before being sent for adds on any format on US radios, "Love On Top" debuted at number 36 on the BDS Urban AC National airplay chart issue dated October 29, 2011, having amassed 106 spins, including 55 in 7 days. According to Nielsen BDS, 18 Urban AC radio stations added the song to their playlists for that week ending. For the week ending March 3, 2012, it became Beyoncé's first number-one on the US Adult R&B Airplay chart.

Similarly owing to the live performance, "Love On Top" debuted at number 65 on the Canadian Hot 100 chart issue dated September 17, 2011. The song also entered at number 75 on the UK Singles Chart and at number 23 on the UK R&B Chart on September 4, 2011, It debuted at number 14 on the New Zealand Singles Chart the following day, and spent seven non-consecutive weeks on the chart. In Ireland, "Love On Top" made its debut at number 47 on September 8, 2011. The song also entered at number 40 on the Australian Singles Chart on September 12, 2011. The following week, it debuted at number 9 of the Australian Urban Singles Chart, and was the most added song to radios in Australia. "Love On Top" peaked at number 20 on the singles chart on November 6, 2011, and number 4 on the urban chart on October 17, 2011. Having spent 16 consecutive weeks on the Australian Singles Chart, the song was certified six-times platinum by the Australian Recording Industry Association (ARIA), denoting sales of 420,000 copies.

After having been announced as a single in the UK, "Love On Top" re-entered the UK Singles Chart at number 154 on November 13, 2011, and moved to number 87 the following week. It also moved from number 63 to number 38 on the UK R&B Chart. On December 4, 2011, "Love On Top" climbed from number 54 to number 28 on the UK Singles Chart and from 16 to number 7 on the UK R&B Chart, where the song has peaked. The following week, it moved to number 22 on the UK Singles Chart, where it remained until January 1, 2012. On January 8, 2012, "Love On Top" reached number 20, selling 15,660 digital copies and bringing its total sales to 120,648 copies. The single peaked at number 13 on the UK Singles Chart the following week. On June 9, 2015, the British Phonographic Industry (BPI) certified "Love On Top" platinum, denoting sales of 600,000 copies in the country.

== Music video ==
=== Background ===
The music video for "Love On Top" was directed by Ed Burke and Beyoncé. A preview of the clip was shown on the Australian television program, Sunday Night, on October 9, 2011. The visuals showed Beyoncé in a black leotard, stockings, high-top sneakers, and medal-adorned Czech military cap. Together with her five male dancers, they perform choreographed moves at Canoe Studios, a penthouse studio in West Chelsea overlooking New York City. The preview was inspired by the music video for "If It Isn't Love" by American band New Edition and was described as "stripped-down" by Tom Ayres of Digital Spy. The full video was initially supposed to be premiered on October 17, 2011, on Australia's Today Show. However, the release date was pushed up a day and it was released on October 16, 2011, instead. That same day, Beyoncé posted the following statement regarding the video on her official website:

I am excited to give my Australian fans the World Premiere of 'Love On Top'! Thank you for the amazing response to the song at radio. I have worked very hard on this video, this song is special to me and I had an idea for the video based on some of my favorite male groups. I remember seeing videos from New Edition, the Jackson 5 and the Temptations, bands I love for their beautiful harmonies, and precise choreography and I always wanted to make a video and be part of a boy group myself. It was so much fun. I put my heart and soul into 'Love On Top' and I hope you love it.

After the release of the sneak peek, Michael Bivins of New Edition told Theybf.com, "When I saw Beyonce on the MTV awards in the sequined jacket this year and with the dancers in R&B group positions, I knew then she was showing love to NE! The video teaser was part two... the classic video 'If It Isn't Love' reference." After the release of the full video, Johnny Gill told S2S magazine that he considers "Love On Top"'s video to be a tribute and that Beyoncé as well as her backup dancers did a great job of capturing New Edition's essence. In his opinion, that is why "she is one of the greatest living performers." He went on to say, "[The video] was so cool. There's no more Michael Jackson but I think she's a beast to begin with. It's such an honor to have someone who knew, and knows, her history and to be aware of where it all started."

=== Synopsis ===
Although the song is 4 minutes and 27 seconds long, the video is 3 minutes and 17 seconds long due to the omission of the second verse. Erika Ramirez of Billboard magazine and Melissa Maerz of Entertainment Weekly highlighted the fact that Beyoncé wears several different clothes including the dress that was worn during her performance at the 2011 MTV Video Music Awards. The clip starts with a casually dressed Beyoncé moving in coordination with her male back-up dancers who are also wearing casual clothes and Nike Dunks. Wearing a black body suit with black hose, Beyoncé puts on a display of footwork before breaking into the song. About halfway through, the visuals suddenly switch to night as the singer lights up the space in various formal looks, including a gold pantsuit, white suit, and finally a tuxedo complete with coattails, top hat, and cane. The choreography from here resembles that of the 1960s male groups. The wardrobe changes in fact correspond with every key change, except the final one. The video ends with Beyoncé yelling "cut!" and the shot returns to them at rehearsal.

=== Reception ===
Consequence of Sound's Alex Young praised the simplicity of the concept adding that it costs "more money than your entire life fortune." That was echoed by Andrew Martin of Prefix Magazine who called the video "super-simplistic, albeit effective." A writer of OK! compared the video with Will Smith's work in The Fresh Prince of Bel-Air adding that Beyoncé "has gone back to video basics." A writer of The Huffington Post called the video a "fresh take on a New Edition classic" and concluded that it was a "lot more simple than it sounds." Lisa Potter of Marie Claire also praised the energy and Beyoncé's figure in the video, writing, "The pregnant superstar puts on another energetic performance during the video, showing off her fabulous figure in a skimpy black leotard complete with a military fetish cap and Isabel Marant sneakers, before changing into a series of tailored suits." Jenna Hally Rubenstein of MTV Buzzworthy wrote that the video was similar to Michael Jackson's Dangerous era adding, "While some might say the basic concept of Beyoncé's 'Love on Top' video is too straightforward, we actually think it's amazing – just let Beyoncé sing, dance, look fuhLAWless and wear a cute hat! What else do you people need?!" Maura Johnston of The Village Voice described the video as a direct homage to New Edition's "If It Isn't Love" but added that when the song's key changes start, "Beyoncé and her posse of backup dancers get a bit brassier and fancier". She further wrote that the video was something that Phil Collins "would be proud" of.

Comparing the video with works by Stevie Wonder, Matthew Perpetua of Rolling Stone wrote, "compared to the over-the-top sensory overload of 'Countdown, ' the 'Love on Top' clip is very simple and straightforward, with the singer performing with backup singers and dancers in a spare room. Still, she changes wardrobe with every key change as the song reaches its euphoric climax." Similarly, Leah Collins of Dose magazine wrote, "New jack swing dance moves and costume changes are pretty much the focus of this one. [...] Still, Beyonce reveals a talent we never knew she had: the ability to switch costumes every time she switches keys. (This, it turns out, is a good thing. That pantsless African dictator look in the first scene? Maybe we're the only ones, but we're not really feeling Idi Amin-chic this season.)" Georgette Cline of The Boombox found similarities between the video for "Love On Top" and the earlier videos that Beyoncé made with Destiny's Child while Sarah Anne Hughes of The Washington Post called the video fancy and an "obvious homage to New Edition's 'If It Isn't Love.'" A more mixed review was given by Amanda Dobbins of New York magazine who wrote that "The video will do nothing to silence Beyoncé plagiarism or baby bump conspiracy theorists; the first half borrows from an old New Edition video, and the entire thing was clearly filmed before her bump began to show." However, she added, "Still, Vulture salutes any artistic undertaking that requires a costume change with every key change." The video was nominated in the category for Video of the Year at the 2012 BET Awards and in the category for Best Female Video at the 2012 MTV Video Music Awards. It won Best Dance Performance at the 2012 Soul Train Music Awards.

== Live performances ==
Beyoncé performed "Love On Top" live for the first time on August 14, 2011, during her residency show 4 Intimate Nights with Beyoncé held at Roseland Ballroom in New York City. Wearing a gold dress, she performed the song in front of 3,500 people, backed by her all-female band and her backing singers, the Mamas. Jon Caramanica of The New York Times gave praise to Beyoncé, favoring performances of "underdog tracks" such as "Party" and "Love On Top". Jody Rosen of Rolling Stone also complimented Beyoncé's performance of the song, commending how she turned "the groovy 'Love on Top' into a vintage soul showcase, dropping on bended knee to unleash melismas at the top of her vocal range." Jozen Cummings of The Wall Street Journal commented that "the focus was on her voice [on] 'Love on Top' [...] she changes key four times — impressive on the album but even more so in person." Yolanda Sangweni of Essence magazine stated that the fact that Beyoncé goes through four key changes is "quite a feat for any singer." The live performance was later included on the DVD Live at Roseland: Elements of 4 which chronicled the concert. It premiered online and released on the iTunes Store on January 11, 2012.

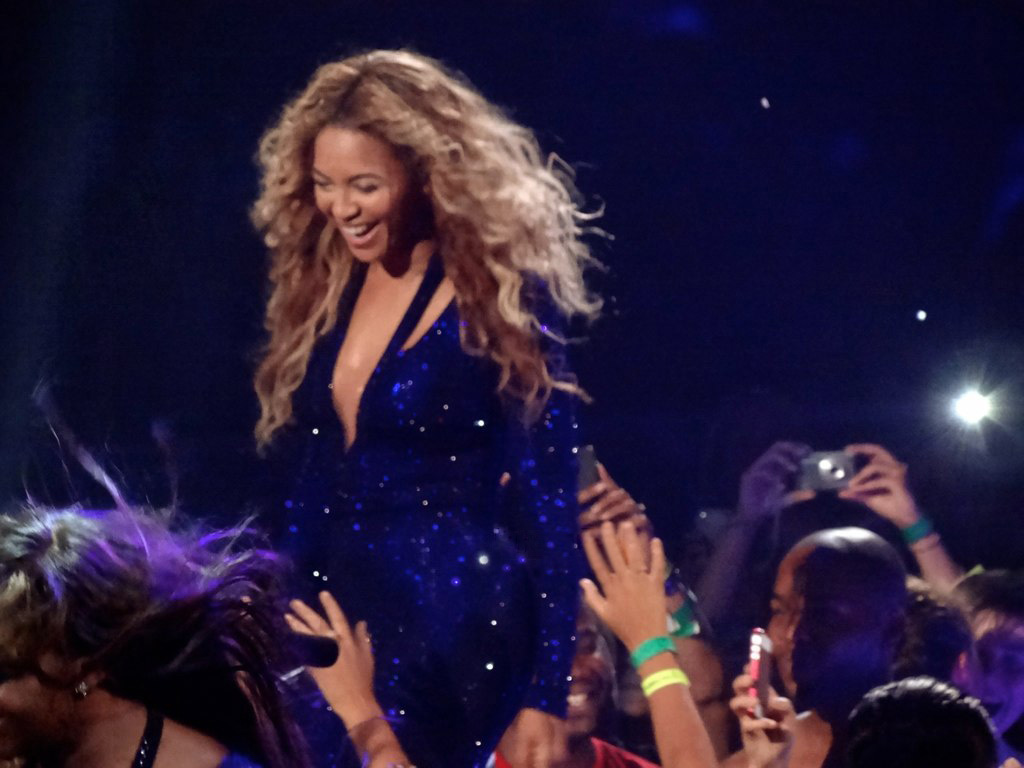
Beyoncé performing "Love On Top" during The Mrs. Carter Show World Tour in 2013

In May 2012, Beyoncé performed "Love On Top" during her residency show Revel Presents: Beyoncé Live in Atlantic City. Beyoncé started singing the song by saying, "Atlantic City, snap your fingers". According to Maura Johnston of The Village Voice, the crowd "sang the chorus of 'Love on Top' and even... tried its endlessly modulating key-change while Beyoncé watched with bemusement and delight". Chuck Darrow of The Philadelphia Inquirer was positive about the performance of the song during the concert, saying, "As for the music, Beyonce kept the needle in the red zone for much of the show, dealing primarily in such full-throttle, groove-intensive signature tracks as 'Love on Top'". Tris McCall of New Jersey On-Line noted that she "made the most of each modulation and break" while performing the song. Rebecca Thomas of MTV News was also positive about the performance, writing, "Without missing a step of the New Edition-inspired choreography, B powered through the song's modulations in an extended vocal showcase." The performance of "Love On Top" on the concert was later included on the concert film Live in Atlantic City (2013).

Beyoncé sang the chorus of the song a cappella during the opening of her Super Bowl XLVII halftime show performance. In 2013 and 2014, the song was part of the set list of Beyoncé's The Mrs. Carter Show World Tour. On May 8, 2013, while performing the song in Manchester, she held her microphone out to a random audience member, which turned out to be British singer Joe McElderry, who sang a line of the song through the microphone. An a cappella version of the song was performed in 2016 as part of the setlist of The Formation World Tour. In 2023, Beyoncé performed "Love on Top" during the Renaissance World Tour. During the performance, she sang the final two key changes once again a cappella with the audience. Starting May 1, 2025, Beyoncé performed "Love On Top" on the Cowboy Carter Tour.

=== Video Music Awards performance ===
At the 2011 MTV Video Music Awards, Beyoncé performed "Love On Top" after having said on the black carpet about an hour before going on stage that she would be making an announcement. Before beginning her live performance, she said to the audience: "Tonight I want you to stand up on your feet, I want you to feel the love that's growing inside of me", giving a hint about the news that she had alluded to on the black carpet. She took the stage in "a purple spangly tuxedo jacket, black pants and white tuxedo shirt, still rocking her fierce six-inch heels of old, pregnant or not", as stated by Gil Kaufman of MTV News. As she performed, her blond hair blowing in the wind, and backed by six dancers wearing similar shimmering tuxes, Beyoncé gave new meaning to the lyrics: "Now everybody asks me why I'm smiling out from ear to ear." She kept her dancing to a minimum for most of the song as she held onto the microphone stand while singing "Love On Top". Eventually making her way to the extended lip in front of the stage and throwing down, she encouraged the audience to put their hands together. Beyoncé ended the performance by dropping the microphone, opening her jacket, rubbing her belly, and thus announcing her pregnancy to the world.

Describing Beyoncé as "a veteran on the VMA stage", Kaufman wrote that "the audience was clearly feeling the love also" and praised how she "[got] a bit wild as she brought the tune home with some of her signature." Staff members of the AOL's The Boombox commented that the lyrics of the song "felt especially meaningful" to announce her pregnancy to the world. Staff members of Rolling Stone called the performance "spectacular" while Todd Martens of the Los Angeles Times called it "rousing". Claire Suddath of Time magazine commented that "this offering from the reigning queen of pop music is relatively toned down and yet she still looked and sounded better than nearly everyone else at the awards." Similarly, Darren Franich of Entertainment Weekly wrote that "If you had to pick one defining moment, it would have to be Beyoncé's baby bump. The diva's rendition of 'Love on Top' might not have been her best VMA performance ever, but there's no denying the sheer electricity in the room when she ended her set by proudly revealing her pregnant tummy." A critic of Essence magazine concluded that "[Beyoncé's] performance of 'Love on Top' at the 2011 VMAs [...] will surely be one of the year's most memorable pop culture moments." The writers of MTV News placed the performance at number 4 on their list of Best Live MTV Performances of 2011. It was stated that Beyoncé was in "typical Sasha Fierce fashion" while the performance was described as "ebullient". Erika Ramirez of Billboard magazine put the performance at number two on her list of "Beyonce's 5 Biggest TV Performances" adding that it was "one of the most memorable TV moments of her career". Dan Hyman from Rolling Stone listed the performance and Beyoncé's announcement of her pregnancy at number 17 on the list of "The 24 Wildest Moments in VMA History", while Billboard listed it at number 7 on its list of "MTV VMAs' 10 Best Performances Ever" in 2013. The performance was nominated for VMAs Most Iconic Performance at the 2024 MTV Video Music Awards.

== Cover versions ==
On March 18, 2012, the girls on the Australian talent show Young Talent Time team opened the show with a performance of "Love On Top", while the boys performed as backing vocalists. Diana Rouvas performed the song on The Voice (Australia) on May 21, 2012. Michelle Graffin of The Age called it the "song of the night", writing that Rouvas was "so good she can wrestle 'Love on Top' from Beyoncé's iron grip and transform it into a smokey nightclub number worthy of the young Liza Minnelli". Rouvas' version of "Love On Top" peaked at number 22 on the Australian Singles Chart on June 3, 2012. On September 17, 2012, Nathaniel Willemse performed "Love On Top" during the first live show of the fourth season of The X Factor in Australia. A writer for Take 40 Australia called it a "smooth performance". On February 22, 2013, Novita Dewi performed "Love On Top" during the first gala show of the first season of X Factor Indonesia.

Amber Holcomb, a contestant of the 12th season of American Idol covered the song on April 10, 2013, during an episode of the show. Brian Mansfield of USA Today praised her performance writing that she was "comfortable and confident and happy" but added that the high melody of the song "puts a little strain on her voice toward the end". That was somewhat echoed by Bobby Olivier of The Star-Ledger who noted that the performance was "pitchy, but a lot of fun". However, he wrote that Holcomb "seemed to struggle a little with keeping up with the melody" and that her version was different from the original, but concluded that it was a solid performance. On April 8, 2013, Zendaya and Val Chmerkovskiy performed a samba dance to the song during the 16th season of the American show Dancing with the Stars. Morissette and Penelope Matanguihan performed the song on the first season of The Voice of the Philippines on June 23 and July 14, 2013, respectively. In 2018 Dami Im released a version on her album I Hear a Song. On February 9, 2017, Peck Palitchoke, a contestant of The Mask Singer Thailand (season 1) under the kangaroo mask, performed "Love On Top". In August 2020, the cast of Pitch Perfect performed a cover of the song in aid of Unicef for the COVID-19 pandemic and the explosion of Beirut.

== Credits and personnel ==
Credits are adapted from 4's liner notes.

- Beyoncé Knowles – vocals, producer, songwriter
- Alex Asher – trombone
- Nikki Glaspie – drums
- Serban Ghenea – mixer
- John Hanes – mix engineer
- Cole Kamen-Green – trumpet
- Terius "The-Dream" Nash – songwriter
- Drew Sayers – tenor, baritone saxophone
- Phil Seaford – mix engineer assistant
- Robert "R.T." Taylor – guitar
- Shea Taylor – producer, songwriter, alto saxophone
- Pat Thrall – guitar
- Nick Videen – tenor, alto saxophone
- Johnny Butler – tenor, baritone saxophone
- Pete Wolford – engineer assistant
- Scott Barnett – engineer assistant
- Josiah Woodson – trumpet
- Jordan "DJ Swivel" Young – engineer

== Charts ==
=== Weekly charts ===
Weekly chart performance
Chart (2011–12)	Peak position
Australia (ARIA)	20
Australia Urban (ARIA)	4
Belgium (Ultratip Bubbling Under Flanders)	3
Belgium (Ultratip Bubbling Under Wallonia)	2
Brasil Hot 100 Airplay (Billboard)	74
Canada Hot 100 (Billboard)	65
Croatia International Airplay (HRT)	13
France (SNEP)	83
Global Dance Songs (Billboard)	26
Hungary (Rádiós Top 40)	3
Ireland (IRMA)	21
Italy (FIMI)	18
Japan Hot 100 (Billboard)	85
Mexico Ingles Airplay (Billboard)	32
Netherlands (Dutch Top 40)	23
Netherlands (Single Top 100)	61
New Zealand (Recorded Music NZ)	14
Slovakia (Rádio Top 100)	38
South Africa Airplay (EMA)	8
South Korea International (Gaon)	3
UK Singles (Official Charts)	13
UK Hip Hop/R&B (Official Charts)	6
US Billboard Hot 100	20
US Dance Club Songs (Billboard)	1
US Hot R&B/Hip-Hop Songs (Billboard)	1
US Rhythmic Airplay (Billboard)	23

=== Year-end charts ===
Year-end chart performance
Chart (2011)	Position
Australia (ARIA)	98
Australia Urban (ARIA)	37
South Korea International (Gaon)	45
UK Singles (OCC)	182

Year-end chart performance
Chart (2012)	Position
South Korea International (Gaon)	81
UK Singles (OCC)	129
US Hot R&B/Hip-Hop Songs (Billboard)	1

Year-end chart performance
Chart (2013)	Position
South Korea International (Gaon)	58

Year-end chart performance
Chart (2015)	Position
South Korea International (Gaon)	60

Year-end chart performance
Chart (2016)	Position
South Korea International (Gaon)	68

Year-end chart performance
Chart (2017)	Position
South Korea International (Gaon)	99

== Certifications ==
Certifications
Region	Certification	Certified units/sales
Australia (ARIA)	6× Platinum	420,000^{‡}
Brazil (Pro-Música Brasil)	Diamond	250,000^{‡}
Canada (Music Canada)	2× Platinum	160,000^{‡}
Denmark (IFPI Danmark)	Platinum	90,000^{‡}
Italy (FIMI)	Platinum	50,000^{‡}
New Zealand (RMNZ)	4× Platinum	120,000^{‡}
Portugal (AFP)	Gold	10,000^{‡}
Spain (Promusicae)	Gold	30,000^{‡}
United Kingdom (BPI)	2× Platinum	1,200,000^{‡}
United States (RIAA)	5× Platinum	5,000,000^{‡}
Streaming
Denmark (IFPI Danmark)	Gold	900,000^{†}
^{‡} Sales+streaming figures based on certification alone.^{†} Streaming-only figures based on certification alone.

== Release history ==
Region	Date	Format
Australia	September 12, 2011	Contemporary hit radio
Italy	October 28, 2011	Contemporary hit radio
Belgium	December 7, 2011	Digital download
United States	January 10, 2012	Urban contemporary

== See also ==
- List of number-one R&B singles of 2012 (U.S.)
- List of number-one dance singles of 2012 (U.S.)
