= Two Places at the Same Time (song) =

1980 single by Raydio

Single by Ray Parker Jr. & Raydio

from the album Two Places at the Same Time
- B-side: "Everybody Makes Mistakes"
- Released: 1980
- Genre: Soul
- Length: 3:41
- Label: Arista
- Songwriter: Ray Parker Jr.
- Producer: Ray Parker Jr.

Ray Parker Jr. & Raydio singles chronology
"More Than One Way to Love a Woman" (1979)	"Two Places at the Same Time" (1980)	"For Those Who Like to Groove" (1980)

"Two Places at the Same Time" is a song by Raydio from their third studio album Two Places at the Same Time. Released as a single by Arista Records in 1980, the tune reached No. 30 on the US Billboard Hot 100 chart and No. 6 on the Hot Soul Singles chart.

== Critical reception ==
Phyl Garland of Stereo Review claimed the song "bears a vague resemblance to the Peaches and Herb hit "Reunited" and stands up just as well to repeated hearings." Andy Kellman of AllMusic took note that "The title track, not as fully developed as the following year's bigger ballad "A Woman Needs Love," has Parker swapping verses with Arnell Carmichael over pleasant, functional backing.
