= More Than One Way to Love a Woman =

Single by Raydio

from the album Rock On
- B-side: "Hot Stuff"
- Released: 1979
- Genre: R&B, Funk, Disco
- Label: Arista
- Songwriter(s): Ray Parker Jr.
- Producer(s): Ray Parker Jr.

Raydio singles chronology
"You Can't Change That" (1979)	"More Than One Way to Love a Woman" (1979)	"Two Places at the Same Time" (1980)

Music video
- "More Than One Way to Love a Woman" on YouTube

"More Than One Way to Love a Woman" is a 1979 single by R&B band Raydio released on Arista Records. The song reached number 25 on the U.S. Billboard Hot Soul Singles chart.

== Overview ==
"More Than One Way to Love a Woman" was composed and produced by Raydio's leader Ray Parker Jr. The single's B-side was "Hot Stuff". Both tracks came from Raydio's second studio album Rock On.

== Critical reception ==
Ace Adams of the New York Daily News called the song one of the album's "best numbers".
