= I'm Free =

I'm Free may refer to:

== Music ==
- I'm Free (album), an album by Ray Parker Jr
- "I'm Free" (Rolling Stones song), 1965, covered in 1989 by the Soup Dragons
- "I'm Free" (The Who song), 1969
- "I'm Free" (Paris Hilton and Rina Sawayama song), 2024
- "I'm Free", a song by Donna Summer from Cats Without Claws
- "I'm Free", a song by Jon Secada from Jon Secada
- "I'm Free", a song by Pimp C from Pimpalation
- "I'm Free", a song by Scatman John from Everybody Jam!
- "I'm Free (Heaven Helps the Man)", a 1984 song by Kenny Loggins from the Footloose soundtrack

== Television ==
- "I'm free!", the catchphrase of Mr. Humphries in the British sitcom Are You Being Served?
