= Rock On (Raydio album) =

Studio album by Raydio
- Released: 1979
- Recorded: 1978
- Genres: Funk, soul, rock
- Label: Arista
- Producer: Ray Parker Jr.

Raydio chronology
Raydio (1978)	Rock On (1979)	Two Places at the Same Time (1980)

Rock On is the second album by Raydio, released in 1979 on Arista Records. The album reached No. 4 on the US Billboard Top Soul Albums chart and No. 45 on the US Billboard 200 chart. Rock On was certified Gold in the US by the RIAA.

== History ==
Like the debut, it features eight tracks, most of which were written by Ray Parker Jr. It reached a peak of number 45 on the charts and featured two singles; one of them being "You Can't Change That", which was another top ten pop hit, peaking at number 9. The other single, "More Than One Way to Love a Woman", failed to chart on pop, but did make number 25 on R&B.

A song from the album, "Hot Stuff" was covered by Skyline recording artist Karen Silver and it was used as the B-side of her version of "Hold On, I'm Comin'", which was released in 1979.

== Critical reception ==
Professional ratings
Review scores
Source	Rating
AllMusic	4.5/5 stars
Christgau's Record Guide	B+
Melody Maker	(favourable)
Music Week	3/4 stars

Robert Hilburn of the Los Angeles Times described Rock On as "lively and fun". Ace Adams of the New York Daily News wrote, "This is the group that had the big hit 'Jack and Jill', and this album shows them at their best. It has an instant funk sound that will please their fans, plus sparkling vocals and good instrumental interplay." The Bay State Banner wrote that, "by settling for imitating everything from rock to Chic, Ray Parker has Raydio floundering around with poor songs, cutesy lyrics and no direction." Robert Christgau of The Village Voice gave Rock On a B+ grade, writing, "Ray Parker's idea is to synthesize the old black-music tradition of the male vocal group with the new one of the self-contained funk band, and here he proves that he has what it takes as a composer to keep the idea going. None of these songs stands out like 'Is This a Love Thing' and 'Me' did on the debut, but every one is danceable/listenable fun."

Craig Lytle of AllMusic remarked: "To be taken seriously as an R&B group and to shake the stigma of their nursery rhyme hit 'Jack and Jill' (their debut single), Raydio answers the call on this album with two Billboard R&B singles."

== Track listing ==
All tracks written by Ray Parker Jr.

No.	Title	Length
1.	"What You Waitin' For"	4:13
2.	"Hot Stuff"	5:14
3.	"You Can't Change That"	3:23
4.	"Rock On"	5:05
5.	"More Than One Way to Love a Woman"	5:44
6.	"When You're in Need of Love"	6:13
7.	"Goin' Thru School and Love"	4:14
8.	"Honey I'm a Star"	3:39

== Personnel ==
Raydio

- Arnell Carmichael – vocals
- Darren Carmichael – vocals
- Ray Parker Jr. – vocals, keyboards, synthesizers, guitars, bass
- Charles Fearing – guitars
- Larry Tolbert – drums, percussion

Additional personnel

- Sylvester Rivers – acoustic piano
- Ollie E. Brown – drums, percussion, backing vocals
- Jack Ashford – percussion
- Norma Jean Bell – saxophones
- Horatio Gordon – saxophones
- Ken Peterson – trumpet, backing vocals
- Cheryl Brown – backing vocals
- Valorie Jones – backing vocals
- Franci Pearlman – backing vocals

Production

- Ray Parker Jr. – producer, engineer, mixing
- Bernie Grundman – mastering at A&M Studios (Hollywood, California)

== Charts and certifications ==
=== Charts ===
Chart (1979)	Peak position
Australia (Kent Music Report)	65
U.S. Billboard Top Soul LPs	4
U.S. Billboard Top LPs	45

Singles

Year	Single	Peak chart positions		
Year	Single	US Pop	US R&B	US A/C
1979	"You Can't Change That"	9	3	25
1979	"More Than One Way to Love a Woman"	—	25	—

=== Certifications ===
Country	Certification
U.S. RIAA	Gold
