= A Woman Needs Love =

Studio album by Raydio
- Released: 1981
- Genre: R&B, funk, soul
- Length: 40:29
- Label: Arista
- Producer: Ray Parker Jr.

Raydio chronology
Two Places at the Same Time (1980)	A Woman Needs Love (1981)

A Woman Needs Love is an album by the American band Raydio, led by Ray Parker Jr., released in 1981 by Arista Records. It has been certified Gold in the US by the RIAA.

== Critical reception ==
Professional ratings
Review scores
Source	Rating
AllMusic	3/5 stars
Robert Christgau	B+

The Village Voice's Robert Christgau wrote, "Playing guitar, synthesizer, piano, and drums as well as his home bass, which doesn't sound like a lead instrument either, he serves up eight tunes that bump and/or swoon into ear and/or ass with undeniable and virtually unrecallable effectiveness. I like every one, really. But don't ask me which is which--or why it matters." Andy Kellman of AllMusic, remarked that A Woman Needs Love "was the first time Parker got the front sleeve to himself—a signal that he had become the focal point, even though Raydio was his baby from the beginning... As usual, RPJ's likable, sly, and affable nature makes the lesser material go down easy."

== Singles ==
"The title track" peaked at No. 4 on the US Billboard Hot 100, No. 1 on the US Billboard Hot Black Singles chart and No. 11 on the US Billboard Adult Contemporary Songs chart. Another single called "That Old Song" peaked at No. 21 on the US Billboard Hot 100, No. 26 on the US Billboard Hot Black Singles chart, and No. 7 on the US Billboard Adult Contemporary Songs chart. "Still in the Groove", a sequel to the previous album's "For Those Who Like to Groove" also peaked at No. 35 on the US Billboard Dance Club Songs chart.

== Track listing ==
All songs written by Ray Parker Jr.

1. "A Woman Needs Love (Just Like You Do)" – 4:07
2. "It's Your Night" – 6:39
3. "That Old Song" – 4:25
4. "All In the Way You Get Down" – 3:55
5. "You Can't Fight What You Feel" – 5:48
6. "Old Pro" – 4:45
7. "Still In The Groove" – 6:21
8. "So Into You" – 4:29

== Personnel ==
Raydio

- Arnell Carmichael – vocals
- Ray Parker Jr. – vocals, synthesizers, pianos, guitars, bass, drums
- Larry Tolbert – drums

Additional personnel

- Sylvester Rivers – pianos, synthesizers
- Paul Jackson Jr. – guitars
- Ollie E. Brown – drums, percussion
- Jack Ashford – tambourine
- Kenny Flood – flute
- Gene Page – string arrangements
- Harry Bluestone – concertmaster
- Jesse Erlich – cello
- Paula Hochhalter – cello
- Gareth Nuttycombe – viola
- David Schwartz – viola
- Henry Ferber – violin
- Marvin Limonick – violin
- Donald Palmer – violin
- Marshall Sosson – violin
- Robert Sushell – violin
- Darren Carmichael – backing vocals
- Sharon Jack – backing vocals
- Josie James – backing vocals
- Jerry Knight – backing vocals
- Cheryl Lynn – backing vocals
- J.D. Nicholas – backing vocals
- Deborah Thomas – backing vocals

Production

- Ray Parker Jr. – producer, engineer, mixing
- Reginald Dozier – string engineer
- Al Ramirez – assistant string engineer
- Bernie Grundman – mastering at A&M Studios (Hollywood, California)
- Ria Lewerke-Shapiro – art direction
- Aaron Rapoport – photography

== Charts ==
=== Weekly charts ===
Chart (1981)	Peak position
US Billboard 200	13
US Top R&B/Hip-Hop Albums (Billboard)	1

=== Year-end charts ===
Chart (1981)	Position
US Billboard 200	56

=== Singles ===
Year	Single	Peak chart positions			
Year	Single	US	US R&B	US A/C	US Dan
1981	"A Woman Needs Love (Just Like You Do)"	4	1	11	—
1981	"Still in the Groove"	—	—	—	35
1981	"That Old Song"	21	26	7	—
1981	"It's Your Night"	—	73	—	—

== See also ==
- List of Billboard number-one R&B albums of 1981
