= After Dark (Ray Parker Jr. album) =

Studio album by Ray Parker Jr.
- Released: August 25, 1987
- Recorded: 1986–1987
- Studio: Ameraycan (Hollywood, California); Ocean Way (Hollywood, California); Conway (Hollywood, California); Cherokee (Hollywood, California); Lion Share (Los Angeles, California); Wonderland (Los Angeles, California); Devonshire (Burbank, California)
- Genre: R&B; pop; soul
- Label: Geffen
- Producer: Ray Parker Jr.; Burt Bacharach; Carole Bayer Sager

Ray Parker Jr. chronology
| Sex and the Single Man (1985) | After Dark (1987) | I Love You Like You Are (1991) |

Singles from After Dark
- 1. "I Don't Think That Man Should Sleep Alone" Released: April 1987; 2. "Over You" Released: 1987

After Dark is the fourth studio album by guitarist/singer/songwriter Ray Parker Jr. released on August 25, 1987, by Geffen Records. The album was produced by Ray Parker Jr., Burt Bacharach and Carole Bayer Sager. The album reached No. 27 on the Billboard Top R&B Albums chart.

== Singles ==
"I Don't Think That Man Should Sleep Alone" and "Over You" were released as singles. "I Don't Think That Man Should Sleep Alone" reached No. 5 on the Billboard Hot R&B Singles chart, while "Over You" (a duet with Natalie Cole) peaked at No. 10 on the same chart.

== Critical reception ==
Professional ratings
Review scores
| Source | Rating |
|---|---|
| AllMusic | 3/5 stars |
| Village Voice | (C+) |

Ron Wynn of AllMusic noted, "This was the closest Ray Parker Jr. ever came to doing adult soul... Parker's voice sounded more somber, introspective, and varied than on anything before or since."

Robert K. Oermann of USA Today ranked this album at number four on his list of 1987's top 50 R&B albums.

== Track listing ==
| # | Title | Writer(s) | Length |
|---|---|---|---|
| 1. | "I Don't Think That Man Should Sleep Alone" | Ray Parker Jr. | 4:13 |
| 2. | "Over You" (duet with Natalie Cole) | Ray Parker Jr., Carole Bayer Sager, Burt Bacharach | 4:38 |
| 3. | "Lovin' You" | Ray Parker Jr. | 4:08 |
| 4. | "You Shoulda Kept a Spare" | Ray Parker Jr. | 4:46 |
| 5. | "The Past" | Ray Parker Jr. | 3:27 |
| 6. | "You Make My Nature Dance" | Ray Parker Jr. | 4:30 |
| 7. | "Perfect Lovers" | Carole Bayer Sager, Burt Bacharach, Nathan East | 4:52 |
| 8. | "After Midnite" | Ray Parker Jr. | 4:03 |
| 9. | "I Love Your Daughter" | Ray Parker Jr. | 3:44 |
| 10. | "After Dark" | Ray Parker Jr. | 4:29 |

== Personnel ==
Musicians

- Ray Parker Jr. – all instruments, arrangements (1, 3, 4, 6–10)
- Burt Bacharach – keyboards, arrangements (2)
- Robbie Buchanan – keyboards
- Eric Daniels – keyboards
- Wayne Linsey – keyboards
- Greg Phillinganes – keyboards
- Sylvester Rivers – keyboards
- Larry Williams – synthesizers
- Kevin Toney – acoustic piano
- Paul Jackson Jr. – guitars
- Nathan East – bass guitar
- Cornelius Mims – bass guitar
- Neil Stubenhaus – bass guitar
- Ollie E. Brown – drums
- Jeff Porcaro – drums
- Carlos Vega – drums
- Gerald Albright – saxophone solo (2)
- David Boroff – saxophone solo (4)
- Gene Page – arrangements (5)
- Natalie Cole – lead vocals (2)

Background vocalists

- Philip Bailey, Arnell Carmichael, Lynne Fiddmont, Candice Ghant, Keith Harrison, Yogi Horton, Kamaya Koepke, Kashif (also BGV arrangements on 5), Cornelius Mims, Ray Parker Jr., Greg Phillinganes, Monty Seaward, Anita Sherman, Julia Waters, Maxine Waters and Karyn White

Production

- Producers – Ray Parker Jr. (tracks 1, 3–6, 8, 9 & 10); Burt Bacharach (tracks 2 & 7); Carole Bayer Sager (tracks 2 & 7)
- Production assistant – Horatio Gordon
- Engineer – Steve Halquist
- Additional engineers – Mick Guzauski, Mike Mancini, Gary Olazabal and Tommy Vicari
- Assistant engineers – Jerry Hall and Ray Parker III
- Art direction – Laura LiPuma
- Photography – Victoria Sim
