= I Love You Like You Are =

Studio album by Ray Parker Jr.
- Released: 1991
- Recorded: 1990–1991
- Studio: Ameraycan (North Hollywood, California)
- Length: 57:34
- Label: MCA
- Producer: Ray Parker Jr., Father MC, Gary Taylor

Ray Parker Jr. chronology
After Dark (1987)	I Love You Like You Are (1991)	I'm Free (2006)

I Love You Like You Are is an album by the American musician Ray Parker Jr., released in 1991. It includes the single "She Needs to Get Some".

== Production ==
The album was produced by Parker Jr. It was recorded at Ameraycan Studios, in Los Angeles.

== Critical reception ==
Professional ratings
Review scores
Source	Rating
AllMusic	2/5 stars
Calgary Herald	C−
Chicago Tribune	1/4 stars
The Encyclopedia of Popular Music	2/5 stars

The Chicago Tribune wrote: "Opting to leave his guitar at home, Parker relies solely on synthesizers and drum machines to grind out one mildly arresting dance track ('Ain't Gone Go for That') and several interminable ballads." The Calgary Herald noted that "there's nothing here you haven't heard before, usually in a more interesting form."

== Track listing ==
#	Title	Writer(s)	Length
1.	"She Needs to Get Some"	Ray Parker Jr.	5:10
2.	"Ain't Gone Go for That"	Ray Parker Jr.	5:04
3.	"I Love You Like You Are"	Ray Parker Jr.	4:17
4.	"No Matter What Happens"	Ray Parker Jr.	4:44
5.	"Love Is So Strange"	Ray Parker Jr.	5:24
6.	"Girl I Saw You"	Father MC	4:32
7.	"Til I Met You"	Ray Parker Jr.	4:24
8.	"Yesterday"	Ray Parker Jr.	4:37
9.	"Angel"	Ray Parker Jr.	4:46
10.	"Let's Go Back to Bed"	Chris Pelcer, Ray Parker Jr.	4:36
11.	"Love, Sex and Money"	Ray Parker Jr.	4:24
12.	"Square One"	Gary Taylor	5:46

== Personnel ==
- Ray Parker Jr. – lead vocals, instruments (1–5, 7–11), backing vocals (8–10)
- Chris Pelcer – instruments (10)
- Gary Taylor – instruments (12), backing vocals (12)
- Aaron Smith – synthesizers (10)
- Cornelius Mims – bass (2)
- Damon Thomas – bass (2), instruments (6), synthesizers (7)
- Ollie E. Brown – percussion (2, 10)
- J.D. Nicholas – backing vocals (1–4, 7)
- Father MC – rap (1, 4), backing vocals (6)
- Rosalyn Keel – backing vocals (3, 5, 7, 11)
- Sidney Justin – backing vocals (3, 7)
- Sheldon Reynolds – backing vocals (3, 7)
- Karen Taylor – backing vocals (3, 5, 7, 11)
- Tricky Stewart – backing vocals (6)
- Angel Rogers – backing vocals (10)
- Terry Steele – backing vocals (10)
- Leon Ware – backing vocals (10)
- Cheri Wells – backing vocals (10)
- MC Mello – rap (11)

Production

- Ray Parker Jr. – producer (1–5, 7–11), recording (1–11), mixing (1–11)
- Father MC – producer (6)
- Gary Taylor – producer (12)
- Ross Donaldson – recording (12), mixing (12)
- Steve Hall – mastering at Future Disc (Hollywood, California)
- Donn Davenport – creative consultant
- Vartan Kurjian – art direction
- Jonas Livingston – art direction
- Cimarron/Bacon/O'Brien – design
- David Roth – cover and liner photography
- Jon Abeyta – additional photography
