= Woman Out of Control =

Studio album by Ray Parker Jr.
- Released: 1983
- Studios: Ameraycan (North Hollywood, California)
- Genres: R&B, soul
- Length: 36:55
- Labels: Arista; Funky Town Grooves
- Producer: Ray Parker Jr.

Ray Parker Jr. chronology
The Other Woman (1982)	Woman Out of Control (1983)	Sex and the Single Man (1985)

Woman Out of Control is the second solo album by Ray Parker Jr., released in 1983 on Arista Records.

The album peaked at No. 45 on the Billboard 200. The single "I Still Can't Get Over Loving You" reached No. 12 on the Billboard Hot 100.

It was remastered and expanded by Funky Town Grooves in 2012.

== Critical reception ==
Professional ratings
Review scores
Source	Rating
AllMusic	2.5/5 stars
Robert Christgau	B
The Encyclopedia of Popular Music	2/5 stars
The Philadelphia Inquirer	4/5 stars

The Philadelphia Inquirer wrote that "except for a tedious exercise in synthesizer pop, this is a strong Parker album, full of catchy melodies and tart humor." Stereo Review thought that Parker "proves that it is possible to be thoroughly modern without modulating into high-tech punk."

== Track listing ==
All tracks are written by Ray Parker Jr.

No.	Title	Length
1.	"Woman Out of Control"	4:13
2.	"I Still Can't Get Over Loving You"	4:07
3.	"Electronic Lover"	4:26
4.	"In the Heat of the Night"	4:14
5.	"I Don't Want to Know"	4:30
6.	"She Still Feels the Need"	4:06
7.	"Invasion"	7:30
8.	"N2U2"	3:49
Total length:		36:55

Expanded edition
No.	Title	Length
9.	"Jack and Jill (Back Up the Hill)" (1982 Version)	8:24

== Personnel ==
- Ray Parker Jr. – lead vocals, backing vocals, pianos, synthesizers, guitars, bass, drums
- Eddie "Bongo" Brown – congas
- Ollie E. Brown – percussion
- Jack Ashford – tambourine
- Charles Green – saxophones, flute
- Alex Brown – backing vocals
- Arnell Carmichael – backing vocals
- J.D. Nicholas – backing vocals
- Anita Sherman – backing vocals

Production

- Ray Parker Jr. – producer, engineer, recording, mixing
- Steve Halquist – assistant engineer
- Ria Lewerke – art direction
- Leon Lecash – photography
