= That Old Song =

Single by Ray Parker Jr. & Raydio

from the album A Woman Needs Love
- B-side: "Old Pro"
- Released: July 1981
- Genre: Pop, R&B
- Length: 4:24
- Label: Arista
- Songwriter(s): Ray Parker Jr.
- Producer(s): Ray Parker Jr.

Ray Parker Jr. & Raydio singles chronology
"Still in the Groove" (1981)	"That Old Song" (1981)	"It's Your Night" (1981)

"That Old Song" is a 1981 song recorded by American R&B vocalist and songwriter Ray Parker Jr., along with his group, Raydio. It was the third of four single releases from their 1981 album, A Woman Needs Love, the last Parker recorded with Raydio. It was the second biggest hit from the album, after "A Woman Needs Love (Just Like You Do)."

== Chart history ==
"That Old Song" reached number 21 on the Hot 100 and peaked at number seven on the Adult Contemporary chart.

Chart (1981)	Peak position
U.S. Billboard Hot 100	21
U.S. Billboard Hot Soul Singles	26
U.S. Billboard Adult Contemporary	7
U.S. Cash Box Top 100	27
