= Sex and the Single Man =

Studio album by Ray Parker Jr.
- Released: June 27, 1985
- Label: Arista
- Producer: Ray Parker Jr.

Ray Parker Jr. chronology
| Woman Out of Control (1983) | Sex and the Single Man (1985) | After Dark (1987) |

Sex and the Single Man is an album by the American musician Ray Parker Jr., released in 1985 on Arista Records. It includes the singles "Girls Are More Fun" and "One Sided Love Affair". It peaked at No. 65 on the Billboard 200.

== Critical reception ==
Professional ratings
Review scores
| Source | Rating |
|---|---|
| AllMusic | 2/5 stars |
| Robert Christgau | B− |

The Gazette wrote that "side one finds pop-funk's most blatant copycat in his Prince mode." The Chicago Tribune dismissed the album as "the same schtick he's been using since his Raydio days... Not only is it old, but it's been done with a lot more humor and style by Morris Day." Knight Ridder labeled the album "both the smoothest and the slimiest soul-rock on the shelves today."

== Track listing ==
| # | Title | Writer(s) | Length |
|---|---|---|---|
| 1. | "Girls Are More Fun" | Ray Parker Jr. | 4:45 |
| 2. | "Good Time Baby" | Ray Parker Jr. | 4:37 |
| 3. | "Everybody Wants Someone" | Ray Parker Jr. | 4:42 |
| 4. | "I'm a Dog" | Ray Parker Jr. | 4:14 |
| 5. | "One-Sided Love Affair" | Ray Parker Jr. | 3:58 |
| 6. | "Sex and the Single Man" | Ray Parker Jr. | 4:19 |
| 7. | "I'm in Love" | Ray Parker Jr. | 4:38 |
| 8. | "Men Have Feelings Too" | Ray Parker Jr. | 4:28 |

== Personnel ==
- Ray Parker Jr. – lead vocals, backing vocals, keyboards, guitars, bass, drums, arrangements (1–4, 6–8)
- Chuckii Booker – keyboards
- Joe Curiale – keyboards
- Steve Halquist – synthesizers
- Paul Jackson Jr. – guitars
- Ed Greene – drums
- Charles Green – saxophones
- Earl Dumler – oboe
- Gene Page – arrangements (5)
- Ollie E. Brown – backing vocals
- Arnell Carmichael – backing vocals
- Gwyn Foxsworth – backing vocals
- Randy Hall – backing vocals
- Michael Henderson – backing vocals
- J.D. Nicholas – backing vocals
- Lylian (Tynes) Perry – backing vocals, vocal solo (6)
- Anita Sherman – backing vocals
- The Valley People – additional backing vocals

Production

- Ray Parker Jr. – producer, engineer, mixing
- Reggie Dozier – additional engineer
- Steve Halquist – additional engineer
- Brian Gardner – mastering at Bernie Grundman Mastering (Hollywood, California)
- Ria Lewerke – art direction
- Sue Reilly – design
- Andrew Sackheim – photography
- Mary Stern – title lettering
