= The Other Woman (Ray Parker Jr. song) =

1982 title track for the eponymous album

Single by Ray Parker Jr.

from the album The Other Woman
- B-side: "Stay the Night"
- Released: March 1982
- Genre: Pop rock
- Length: 4:06 (album version); 3:46 (single edit); 5:54 (12″ version)
- Label: Arista
- Songwriter: Ray Parker Jr.
- Producer: Ray Parker Jr.

Ray Parker Jr. singles chronology
"That Old Song" (1981)	"The Other Woman" (1982)	"Let Me Go" (1982)

Music video
- "The Other Woman" on YouTube

"The Other Woman" is the title track from the album The Other Woman by American singer-songwriter Ray Parker Jr., and was his first solo hit single without his longtime group, Raydio. Released as a single in the US in March 1982, it peaked at number four on the Billboard Hot 100, number two on the Hot Black Singles chart, number twenty-four on the dance chart, and number thirty-three on the Adult Contemporary chart. It also spent one week at number one in Australia and hit top ten in Canada, New Zealand and South Africa.

== Music videos ==
There are two music videos for the single. One had a definite cheesy horror film feel, akin to The Rocky Horror Picture Show, with a lyrics-inspired sexy spin on Dracula.

== Personnel ==
- Ray Parker Jr. - vocals, guitar, bass, drums
- Charles Green - saxophone
- Ollie E. Brown - percussion
- Anita Sherman, Lynn Smith - background vocals

== Chart history ==
=== Weekly charts ===
Weekly chart (1982)	Peak position
Australia (Kent Music Report)	1
Canada RPM Top Singles	7
New Zealand (Recorded Music NZ)	4
South Africa (Springbok Radio)	6
U.S. Billboard Hot 100	4
U.S. Billboard Hot Dance Club Play	24
U.S. Billboard Adult Contemporary	33
U.S. Billboard Hot Black Singles	2

=== Year-end charts ===
Year-end chart (1982)	Rank
Australia (Kent Music Report)	22
Canada	53
US Top Pop Singles (Billboard)	26

== Certifications and sales ==
Region	Certification	Certified units/sales
Australia (ARIA)	Gold	50,000^{^}
^{^} Shipments figures based on certification alone.
