= The Other Woman (Ray Parker Jr. album) =

Studio album by Ray Parker Jr.
- Released: 1982
- Studios: Ameraycan (North Hollywood, California)
- Genres: R&B, soul
- Length: 35:01
- Labels: Arista; Funky Town Grooves
- Producer: Ray Parker Jr.

Ray Parker Jr. chronology
The Other Woman (1982)	Woman Out of Control (1983)

The Other Woman is the debut solo album by guitarist/singer/songwriter Ray Parker Jr. released in 1982 on the Arista label.

== Release and reception ==
Professional ratings
Review scores
Source	Rating
AllMusic	3/5 stars
Robert Christgau	A−
Tom Hull – on the Web	B+

The album was remastered and expanded by Funky Town Grooves in June 2012 including 3 bonus tracks.

== Track listing ==
All tracks are written by Ray Parker Jr.

No.	Title	Length
1.	"The Other Woman"	4:06
2.	"Streetlove"	5:31
3.	"Stay the Night"	4:03
4.	"It's Our Own Affair"	3:54
5.	"Let Me Go"	5:05
6.	"Let's Get Off"	4:54
7.	"Stop, Look Before You Love"	4:02
8.	"Just Havin' Fun"	3:26
Total length:		35:01

Expanded edition
No.	Title	Length
9.	"The Other Woman" (12" Version)	5:54
10.	"Bad Boy" (Non-Album Single)	4:14
11.	"The Other Woman" (12" Instrumental Version)	5:54

== Personnel ==
- Ray Parker Jr. – lead and backing vocals, pianos, synthesizers, guitars, bass, drums (1–4, 6–8)
- Michael Boddicker – vocoder
- Larry Tolber – drums (5)
- Ollie E. Brown – percussion
- Charles Green – saxophones, flute
- Arnell Carmichael – backing vocals
- Jerry Knight – backing vocals
- J.D. Nicholas – backing vocals
- Anita Sherman – backing vocals
- Lynn Smith – backing vocals

Production

- Ray Parker Jr. – producer, engineer, mixing
- Ollie E. Brown – co-producer (2)
- Steve Halquist – assistant engineer
- Bernie Grundman – mastering at A&M Studios (Hollywood, California)
- Ria Lewerke Shapiro – art direction, design
- Leon Lecash – photography
- Sue Reilly – lettering
- Cindy Lecash – stylist
- Sandoura – hair design

== Charts ==
=== Weekly charts ===
Chart (1982)	Peak position
Australia Albums (Kent Music Report)	27
US Billboard 200	11
US Top R&B/Hip-Hop Albums (Billboard)	1

=== Year-end charts ===
Chart (1982)	Position
US Billboard 200	69
US Top R&B/Hip-Hop Albums (Billboard)	16

== See also ==
- List of number-one R&B albums of 1982 (U.S.)
