= For Those Who Like to Groove =

1980 song by Raydio

Single by Raydio

from the album Two Places at the Same Time
- B-side: "Can't Keep From Cryin'"
- Released: 1980
- Genre: Funk
- Label: Arista
- Songwriter(s): Ray Parker Jr.
- Producer(s): Ray Parker Jr.

Raydio singles chronology
"Two Places at the Same Time" (1980)	"For Those Who Like to Groove" (1980)	"Can't Keep You from Cryin'" (1980)

"For Those Who Like to Groove" is a song recorded by R&B band Raydio for the group's 1980 album, Two Places at the Same Time. It was released as a single in 1980 by Arista Records. The song reached number 14 on the Billboard Hot Soul Songs chart and No. 23 on the Billboard Hot Dance Club Play chart.

== Overview ==
"For Those Who Like to Groove" was written and produced by Ray Parker Jr. The single's B-side was the song "Can't Keep from Cryin'". Both tracks came from Raydio's 1980 studio album Two Places at the Same Time.

== Critical reception ==
Andy Kellman of Allmusic described the tune as "basically a variation on Funkadelic's One Nation Under a Groove with a little foreshadowing to Parker's Cheryl Lynn collaboration In the Night."
