= I Still Can't Get Over Loving You =

Single by Ray Parker Jr.

from the album Woman Out of Control
- B-side: "She Still Feels the Need"
- Released: October 1983
- Genre: Synth-pop; electropop
- Length: 4:09
- Label: Arista - Arista 9116
- Songwriter: Ray Parker Jr.
- Producers: Ollie E. Brown and Ray Parker Jr.

Ray Parker Jr. singles chronology
"The People Next Door" (1983)	"I Still Can't Get Over Loving You" (1983)	"Woman Out of Control" (1984)

Music video
- "I Still Can't Get Over Loving You" on YouTube

"I Still Can't Get Over Loving You" is a 1983 song written and performed by Ray Parker Jr. It was the lead single from his Woman Out of Control album of the same year, and it reached #12 on the Billboard Hot 100 in early 1984. It was Parker's fifth top 20 hit, the sixth being 1984's "Ghostbusters".

== Background ==
The song is an up-tempo ballad with electronic instruments. While initially the song speaks of lost love and an ended relationship, the lyrics gradually take a considerably more sinister tone, ultimately implying that the man either is stalking his former girlfriend, or potentially preparing to do harm to her. A turning point in the tone occurs when Parker borrows a line from The Police's "Every Breath You Take", "Every breath you take, I'll be watching you." It is summarily followed by closing lines which indicate that the relationship has taken a dark turn: "There's no way that this thing is through, no; Not yet, I ain't through lovin' you; I'm gettin' mad, girl, don't you ever try to leave, no, no; It'll be the last thing you'll ever do."

== Charts ==
=== Weekly charts ===
Chart (1984)	Peak position
Australia (Kent Music Report)	84
New Zealand (Recorded Music NZ)	48
US Billboard Hot 100	12
U.S. Billboard Adult Contemporary	10
U.S.Billboard Hot Black Singles	12

=== Year-end charts ===
Year-end chart (1984)	Rank
US Top Pop Singles (Billboard)	77
