= Theybf.com =

American celebrity gossip website, founded 2005

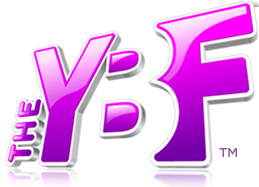
- Website type: Celebrity news/gossip
- Available in: English
- Owner: Natasha Eubanks
- Website: http://www.theybf.com/
- Launched: 2005

Theybf.com is an American celebrity gossip website which focuses on news regarding prominent African-American figures in Hollywood. Theybf.com, which is an abbreviation for the Young, Black and Fabulous, was launched in July 2005 by Natasha Eubanks.

== Background ==
New Orleans native Natasha Eubanks, a graduate of Texas A&M, was working as a hostess at Olive Garden when she decided to make her hobby of reading blogs into a career. She felt there was a lack of stories about African Americans featured on gossip sites. She had completed one year of law school at Loyola University New Orleans before dropping out to make Theybf.com her full-time career.

== Site statistics ==
In March 2016, the Alexa Internet web traffic analysis site gave Theybf.com a ranking, for usage in the United States, of 9,074. According to Black Enterprise Magazine, the ybf.com averages approximately 15 million views per month earning a revenue of 1 million dollars per year, 90% being from advertising.

== Media influence ==
Natasha Eubanks has been featured on WRC-TV in Washington, D.C., and in Black Enterprise magazine.
