= Raydio (album) =

Studio album by Raydio
- Released: September 22, 1978
- Recorded: December 1977–June 1978
- Genre: Funk, soul
- Label: Arista
- Producer: Ray Parker Jr.

Raydio chronology
Raydio (1978)	Rock On (1979)

Raydio is the debut album by the band Raydio, released in 1978 on Arista Records. The album peaked at No. 8 on the Billboard Top Soul LPs chart and No. 27 on the Billboard 200 chart. Raydio was certified gold in the US by the RIAA.

== History ==
Released in 1978 on Arista Records, it featured two hit pop singles: "Jack and Jill" (number 8 pop, number 5 R&B, number 11 in the UK) and "Is This a Love Thing" (number 20 R&B, number 27 UK).

Record World said that the single "Honey I'm Rich" "wrives along on a very Spinner-ish vocal hook."

== Critical reception ==
Professional ratings
Review scores
Source	Rating
AllMusic	4.5/5 stars
Christgau's Record Guide	A−

Robert Christgau of The Village Voice gave the album an A−, saying, "In a depressing time for readymades, here at last is a group--led by a session ace, no less--that seems delighted enough with the tricks it's stolen to put them together with some flair. This trails off into filler on side two, but I like five of its eight songs more than the smash hit 'Jack and Jill'. Black pop music like they've almost stopped making."

== Track listing ==
Adapted from album's text. All tracks written by Ray Parker Jr., except where noted.

No.	Title	Writer(s)	Length
1.	"Is This a Love Thing"		6:16
2.	"You Need This (To Satisfy That)"		4:34
3.	"Betcha Can't Love Me Just Once"		3:51
4.	"Honey I'm Rich"	Ray Parker Jr., Thurlene Johnson	3:10
5.	"Jack and Jill"		4:33
6.	"Me"		4:58
7.	"Let's Go All the Way"		3:27
8.	"Get Down (Instrumental)"		4:20

== Personnel ==
Adapted from album's text.

=== Raydio ===
- Vincent Bonham – vocals
- Arnell Carmichael – vocals
- Ray Parker Jr. – guitars, vocals, recording engineer, mixing
- Jerry Knight – bass, vocals

=== Additional personnel ===
- Jack Ashford – tambourine
- Ollie E. Brown – drums, percussion
- Charles Fearing – guitars
- Horatio Gordon – saxophone
- Ken Peterson – trumpet
- Melvin "Wah Wah" Ragin – guitars, voice box
- Sylvester Rivers – piano
- Sylvia Duckworth, Valerie Jones, Francine Pearlman, Rochelle Runnels, Janice Williams – background vocals
- Bernie Grundman – mastering
- John E. Barrett, David Gahr, Free Lance Photographers – photography
- Steve Feldman – art director

== Charts ==
=== Weekly charts ===
Chart (1978)	Peak Position
Australia Albums (Kent Music Report)	43
US Billboard 200	27
US Top R&B/Hip-Hop Albums (Billboard)	8

=== Year-end charts ===
Chart (1978)	Position
US Billboard 200	97
US Top R&B/Hip-Hop Albums (Billboard)	36

=== Singles ===
Year	Single	Peak chart positions	
Year	Single	US Pop	US R&B
1977	"Jack and Jill"	8	5
1978	"Is This a Love Thing"	—	20
1978	"Honey I'm Rich"	—	43
