= I'm Free (album) =

Studio album by Ray Parker Jr.
- Released: 2006
- Genre: R&B
- Length: 45:22
- Label: Raydio Music Inc.
- Producer: Ray Parker Jr.

Ray Parker Jr. chronology
I Love You Like You Are (1991)	I'm Free (2006)

Professional ratings
Review scores
Source	Rating
AllMusic	link

I'm Free is the sixth album by guitarist/singer/songwriter Ray Parker Jr. He made a comeback after 15 years of absence with this album released from his own independent record company called "Raydio Music Inc.". The record was released in 2006 and included the song "Mexico".

== Track listing ==
#	Title	Writer(s)	Length
1.	"Mexico"	Ray Parker Jr.	4:07
2.	"Glass of Wine"	Ray Parker Jr.	3:33
3.	"Middle Age Crisis"	Ray Parker Jr.	4:20
4.	"Mismayloya Beach"	Ray Parker Jr.	4:05
5.	"The Guitar Man"	Ray Parker Jr., David Gates	4:08
6.	"I'm Free"	Ray Parker Jr.	4:04
7.	"Rum Punch"	Ray Parker Jr.	4:18
8.	"Sunset Ray"	Ray Parker Jr.	4:06
9.	"Forgive Me"	Ray Parker Jr.	4:10
10.	"The Book"	Ray Parker Jr.	4:22
11.	"Gibson's Theme"	Ray Parker Jr.	4:09

== Personnel ==
- Ray Parker Jr. – vocals, synthesizers, guitars, bass, drums, flute
- Kevin Toney – acoustic piano, keyboards
- Sylvester Rivers – organ
- Wah Wah Watson – guitars
- Freddie Washington – bass
- Nathan Watts – bass
- Ed Greene – drums
- Ray Parker III – drums, vocals
- Danny Seraphine – drums
- Ollie E. Brown – percussion
- Fausto Cuevas III – bongos, percussion
- Johnny Britt – trumpet
- Debra Snell – voiceover
- Tiffany Anderson – additional vocals
- Sasha Paste – additional vocals
- HD (Joey, Mark and Shaun Marcus) – additional vocals

Calabasas High Horns

- Mark Einhorn – saxophones
- Michael Dabach – trumpet

=== Production ===
- Ray Parker Jr. – producer, engineer, mixing
- Bernie Grundman – mastering at Bernie Grundman Mastering (Hollywood, California)
- Robert Jackson – art direction, web design
- Elaine Parker – photography
