= Two Places at the Same Time =

Studio album by Raydio
- Released: 1980
- Recorded: 1979
- Genres: Funk, soul
- Length: 36:12
- Label: Arista
- Producer: Ray Parker Jr.

Raydio chronology
Rock On (1979)	Two Places at the Same Time (1980)	A Woman Needs Love (1981)

Two Places at the Same Time is the third studio album by R&B band Raydio, released in 1980 on Arista Records. The album peaked at No. 6 on the US Billboard Top R&B Albums chart and No. 33 on the US Billboard 200. Two Places at the Same Time was certified Gold in the US by the RIAA.

== History ==
Artists such as Herbie Hancock and Ollie Brown made guest appearances. A snipet of a song from the album called "It's Time to Party Now", was featured in the background of a scene in the 1981 Paul Newman crime drama, Fort Apache, The Bronx.

The album's biggest hit single was the title track, which reached number 30 on the Billboard Hot 100, number 6 on the magazine's R&B singles chart, and number 34 on the UK Singles Chart. A second single, "For Those Who Like to Groove", charted at number 14 on the US R&B singles chart.

== Critical reception ==
Professional ratings
Review scores
Source	Rating
AllMusic	3.5/5 stars
Robert Christgau	C+
Rolling Stone	3/5 stars
Smash Hits	5/10

With a 3/5 stars rating, Dave Marsh of Rolling Stone described the album as "not up to the standard of their previous work but still a nice and somewhat adventurous pop/funk set.

Robert Christgau of The Village Voice dismissively claimed, "Leading off with one polite Chic rip and closing out with another, this well-named piece of product is the kind of hither-and-yon effort that signals commercial alarm. Sometimes fawningly pop, othertimes hyperbolically party-hearty, it scores in neither mode."

Phyl Garland of Stereo Review praised the album saying "This music is ideal for dancing, including the lyrics, which at times simply state that it's time to turn up the music and get on down. Of course, if that were all this record had to offer it would hardly be special, but there are also a couple of selections here that have the same strong melodic qualities as classic rhythm-and-blues."

Andy Kellman of AllMusic wrote, "There are eight snappy songs, ranging from candy-coated ballads to light pop-funk". He also called "Two Places, as unassuming and derivative as it is, one of 1980's better R&B albums."

== Track listing ==
All tracks written by Ray Parker Jr., except where noted.

No.	Title	Writer(s)	Length
1.	"It's Time to Party Now"		4:57
2.	"Until the Morning Comes"	Ray Parker Jr., Arnell Carmichael	4:27
3.	"Two Places at the Same Time"		3:53
4.	"Tonight's the Night"	Ray Parker Jr., Herbie Hancock	5:06
5.	"A Little Bit of You"		4:20
6.	"Everybody Makes Mistakes"		4:59
7.	"Can't Keep from Cryin'"		3:39
8.	"For Those Who Like to Groove"		4:30

== Personnel ==
Raydio

- Ray Parker Jr. – vocals, keyboards, synthesizers, guitars, bass
- Arnell Carmichael – vocals
- Darren Carmichael – vocals
- Charles Fearing – guitars
- Larry Tolbert – drums

Additional musicians

- Herbie Hancock – acoustic piano, Moog synthesizer
- Sylvester Rivers – ARP String Ensemble
- Ollie E. Brown – drums, percussion, special effects
- Jack Ashford – tambourine
- Gary Coleman – vibraphone
- Horatio Gordon – saxophones, flute
- Ken Peterson – trumpet, flugelhorn
- Deborah Thomas – backing vocals

Production

- Ray Parker Jr. – producer, engineer, mixing
- Bernie Grundman – mastering at A&M Studios (Hollywood, California)
- Ria Lewerke-Shapiro – art direction
- Gary Regester – photography

== Charts ==
Chart (1980)	Peak position
U.S. Billboard Top LPs	33
U.S. Billboard Top Soul LPs	6

Singles

Year	Single	Peak chart positions			
Year	Single	US Pop	US R&B	US A/C	US Dance
1980	"Two Places at the Same Time"	30	6	34	—
1980	"For Those Who Like to Groove"	—	14	—	23
1980	"Can't Keep You from Cryin'"	—	57	—	—

== Certifications ==
Country	Certification
U.S. RIAA	Gold
