= You Can't Change That =

1979 single by Raydio

Single by Raydio

from the album Rock On
- B-side: "Rock On"
- Released: April 1979
- Recorded: c. 1979
- Genre: Soft rock; yacht rock; soul; funk
- Length: 3:23
- Label: Arista
- Songwriter: Ray Parker Jr.
- Producer: Ray Parker Jr.

Raydio singles chronology
"Honey I'm Rich" (1978)	"You Can't Change That" (1979)	"More Than One Way to Love a Woman" (1979)

"You Can't Change That" is a song by Raydio from their second studio album Rock On. Released as a single in 1979, it reached No. 9 on the US Billboard Hot 100 chart and No. 3 on the soul chart.

The song was originally written for The Spinners who requested Ray to write a song for them. Eventually they declined the song and Raydio produced it for their own album.

== Critical reception ==
Robert Hilburn of the Los Angeles Times called "You Can't Change That" a "good natured" tune that's one of "the album's high points". Craig Lytle of AllMusic also called the song "a laid-back yet very danceable track; it features the vocals of the mild-tempered Ray Parker Jr. and the distinctive tenor of Arnell Carmichael." Record World said it has a "a bit of a Spinners feel."

== Personnel ==
=== Raydio ===
- Arnell Carmichael – vocals
- Ray Parker Jr. – vocals, keyboards, synthesizers

=== Additional personnel ===
- Jack Ashford – percussion
- Ollie E. Brown – drums, percussion, vocals
- Charles Fearing – guitars
- Larry Tolbert – drums, percussion
- Cheryl Brown, Darren Carmichael, Valorie Jones, Francis Pearlman – background vocals

== Chart history ==
=== Weekly charts ===
Chart (1979)	Peak position
Australia (Kent Music Report)	6
Belgium (Ultratop 50 Flanders)	17
Canada Top Singles (RPM)	9
Netherlands (Dutch Top 40)	7
Netherlands (Single Top 100)	12
New Zealand (Recorded Music NZ)	12
US Billboard Hot 100	9
US Adult Contemporary (Billboard)	25
US Hot R&B/Hip-Hop Songs (Billboard)	3
US Cash Box Top 100	10

=== Year-end charts ===
Chart (1979)	Position
Australia (Kent Music Report)	54
Canada Top Singles (RPM)	57
Netherlands (Dutch Top 40)	82
US Billboard Hot 100	30
US Hot R&B/Hip-Hop Songs (Billboard)	46
US Cash Box	65
