= Jack and Jill (song) =

1977 single by Raydio

- Standard artwork

Single by Raydio

from the album Raydio
- B-side: "Get Down"
- Released: December 1977
- Recorded: 1977
- Genre: Disco; soul
- Length: 4:35 (album version); 3:29 (single edit)
- Label: Arista
- Songwriter: Ray Parker Jr.
- Producer: Ray Parker Jr.

Raydio singles chronology
"Jack and Jill" (1977)	"Is This a Love Thing" (1978)

Music video
- "Jack and Jill" on YouTube

"Jack and Jill" is a 1977 hit song by R&B vocal group Raydio. It was the first single from their debut album Raydio, and became an international top 10 hit. It reached number eight on the U.S. Billboard Hot 100 and number six on the Cashbox Top 100. It reached number five in Canada, number four in Australia, and the top twenty in UK. It was the first of five U.S. top 10 singles by Ray Parker Jr. and/or Raydio.

The song describes how "Jack" is lonely and so, in spite of his good intentions, wanders down the hill to find love elsewhere after being neglected by "Jill", who is seldom home.

Record World called it "a mid-tempo r&b song that expands on the nursery rhyme in interesting fashion."

In 1981, "A Woman Needs Love (Just Like You Do)" became a hit as an answer song to "Jack and Jill". Parker wrote an antithesis from "Jill's" perspective, according to the lyrics, "By the time poor Jack returned up the hill, somebody else had been loving Jill."

In 1982, Parker recorded an extended version of the song. It was released on a re-issue of his second solo album. In this version, Parker performed all of the vocals instead of just some of them.

== Personnel ==
=== Raydio ===
- Ray Parker Jr. – guitars, chorus lead vocals
- Jerry Knight – bass, first lead vocals
- Arnell Carmichael – second lead vocals

=== Additional personnel ===
- Ollie E. Brown – drums
- Sylvester Rivers – piano
- Sylvia Duckworth – background vocals
- Valerie Jones – background vocals
- Francine Pearlman – background vocals
- Rochelle Runnels – background vocals*
- Janice Williams – background vocals*

* from the band Stargard

== Chart performance ==
=== Weekly charts ===
Chart (1978)	Peak position
Australia (Kent Music Report)	4
Belgium	22
Canadian RPM	5
Netherlands	24
New Zealand	4
UK Pop Singles	11
US Billboard Hot 100	8
US R&B Singles	5
US Cash Box Top 100	6

=== Year-end charts ===
Chart (1978)	Rank
Australia (Kent Music Report)	42
Canada	35
New Zealand	28
US Billboard	31
US Cash Box	34
