= Ray Parker Jr. =

American musician (born 1954)

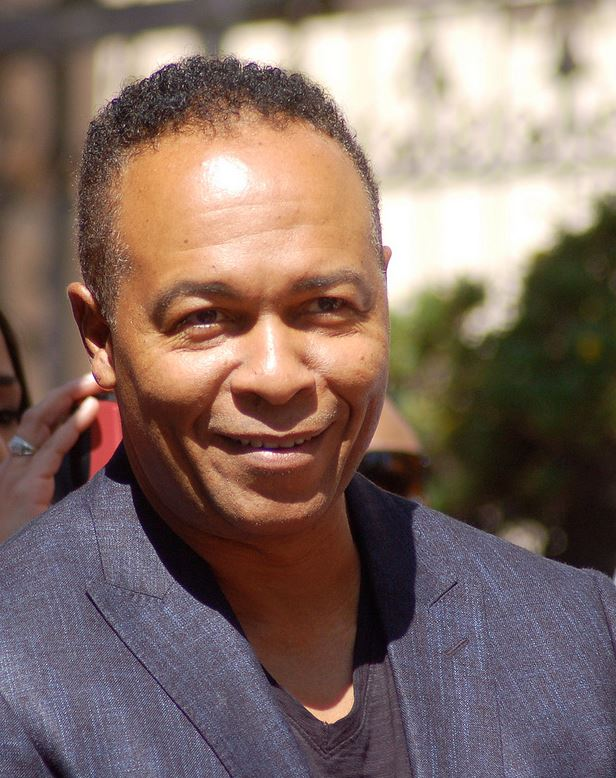
- Parker in 2013

Background information
- Born: Ray Erskine Parker Jr. May 1, 1954 (age 72); Detroit, Michigan, U.S.
- Genres: R&B; soul; funk; disco; dance-rock
- Occupations: Singer; guitarist; songwriter; record producer
- Instruments: Guitar; vocals
- Years active: 1963–present
- Labels: Arista; Geffen; MCA; Atlantic; Raydio
- Formerly of: Raydio
- Spouse: Elaine Parker (m. 1994)
- Website: rayparkerjr.com

Ray Erskine Parker Jr. (born May 1, 1954) is an American singer, guitarist, songwriter, and record producer. As a solo performer, he wrote and performed the theme song for the 1984 film Ghostbusters and also sounds from the animated series The Real Ghostbusters. Previously, Parker achieved a US top-5 hit in 1982 with "The Other Woman". He also performed with his band, Raydio, and with Barry White in the Love Unlimited Orchestra.

== Early life ==
Ray Erskine Parker Jr. was born on May 1, 1954, in Detroit, Michigan, to Venolia Parker and Ray Parker Sr. He attended Angel Elementary School where his music teacher, Alfred T. Kirby, inspired him to be a musician at age six playing the clarinet. He attended Cass Technical High School in the tenth grade.

Parker is a 1971 graduate of Detroit's Northwestern High School. He attended college at Lawrence Institute of Technology.

== Music career ==
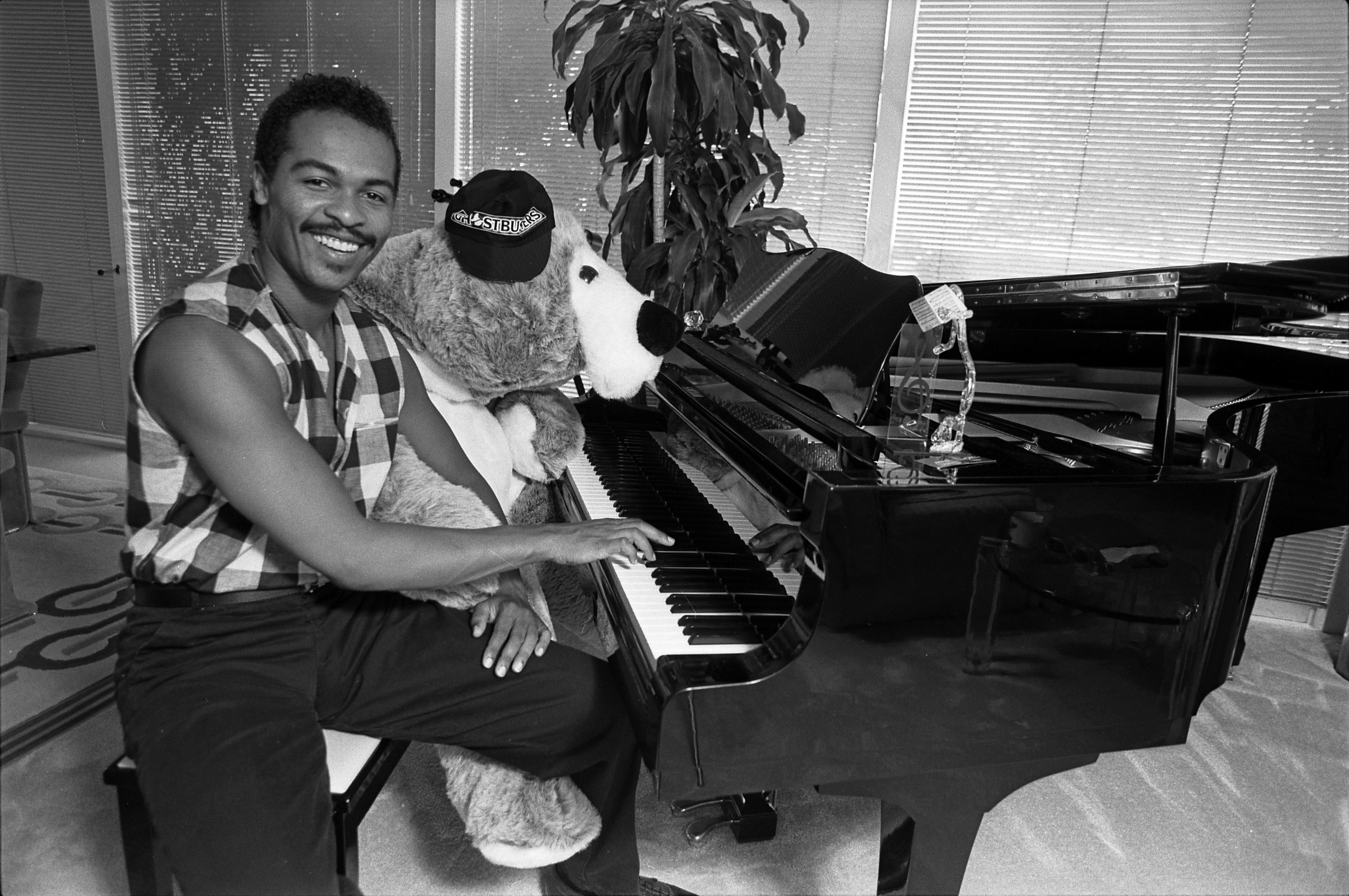
Parker in 1984

Parker gained recognition during the late 1960s as a member of Bohannon's house band at the 20 Grand nightclub. This Detroit hotspot often featured Tamla/Motown acts, one of which, the (Detroit) Spinners, was so impressed by the young guitarist's skills that they added him to their touring group. Through the Bohannon relationship, he recorded and co-wrote his first songs at age 16 with Marvin Gaye. Parker was also employed as a studio musician as a teenager for the emergent Holland-Dozier-Holland's Invictus/Hot Wax stable, and his "choppy" style was especially prominent on "Want Ads", a number one single for Honey Cone. Parker was later enlisted by Lamont Dozier to appear on his first two albums for ABC Records.

In 1972, Parker was a guest guitarist on Stevie Wonder's soul song "Maybe Your Baby", from Wonder's album Talking Book, an association which prompted a permanent move to Los Angeles. He also was the lead guitarist for Wonder when Wonder served as the opening act on the Rolling Stones' 1972 tour. In 1973, he became a sideman in Barry White's Love Unlimited Orchestra. Parker appeared briefly in the 1974 film Uptown Saturday Night as a guitar player in the church picnic scene. He also appeared with Stevie Wonder, playing guitar during Wonder's live performance of "Superstition" on an 1973 episode of Sesame Street.

Ray Parker also played guitar for Rhythm Heritage, Wah Wah Watson, Lee Ritenour, Rufus, Chaka Khan, Tina Turner (1975), Aretha Franklin (also 1975), Jaye P. Morgan (1976), Leon Haywood, Herbie Hancock, Deniece Williams, Spinners, the Temptations, and Gladys Knight & the Pips.

Parker's first bona fide hit as a writer was "You Got the Love", co-written with Chaka Khan and recorded by Rufus. The single hit No. 1 on the R&B charts and No. 11 on the pop charts in December 1974. Parker has stated that he was the original songwriter of Leo Sayer's 1976 hit "You Make Me Feel Like Dancing", but that when he submitted the tune as a demo, his accreditation as such was missed.

In 1977, Parker created the R&B group Raydio with Vincent Bonham, Jerry Knight, and Arnell Carmichael. Raydio scored their first big hit with "Jack and Jill", from their 1978 self-titled album with Arista Records. The song reached No. 8 on the Billboard Hot 100 chart, earning a Gold single and Gold album in the process. Their follow-up hit, "You Can't Change That", was released in 1979 from the Rock On album. The song was another Top 10 hit, peaking at No. 9 on the Billboard chart during the summer and selling a million copies.

In 1980, the group became known as Ray Parker Jr. and Raydio. The group released two more albums: Two Places at the Same Time in 1980 and A Woman Needs Love in 1981, both Gold albums. In 1981, Parker produced the hard funk single "Sweat (Till You Get Wet)" by Brick. During the 1980s, Ray Parker Jr. and Raydio had two Top 40 hits: "Two Places at the Same Time" (No. 30 in 1980) and "That Old Song" (No. 21 in 1981). Their last and biggest hit, "A Woman Needs Love (Just Like You Do)", released in 1981, went to No. 4 on the Billboard Hot 100 and to No. 1 on the R&B Chart for two weeks that year.

Raydio broke up in 1981. Parker continued with his solo career, scoring eight Top 40 hits, including the hit single "The Other Woman" (Pop No. 4) in 1982 and "Ghostbusters" in 1984. "Ghostbusters" peaked at No. 1 for three weeks on Billboard's Hot 100 chart, and at No. 1 for two weeks on its Black Singles chart. The song was also nominated for an Academy Award for Best Original Song in 1984, but lost to Stevie Wonder's "I Just Called to Say I Love You" from The Woman in Red. Parker's song secured him a 1984 Grammy Award for Best Pop Instrumental Performance. Other hits from this period included "I Still Can't Get Over Loving You" (Pop No. 12) and "Jamie" (Pop No. 14).

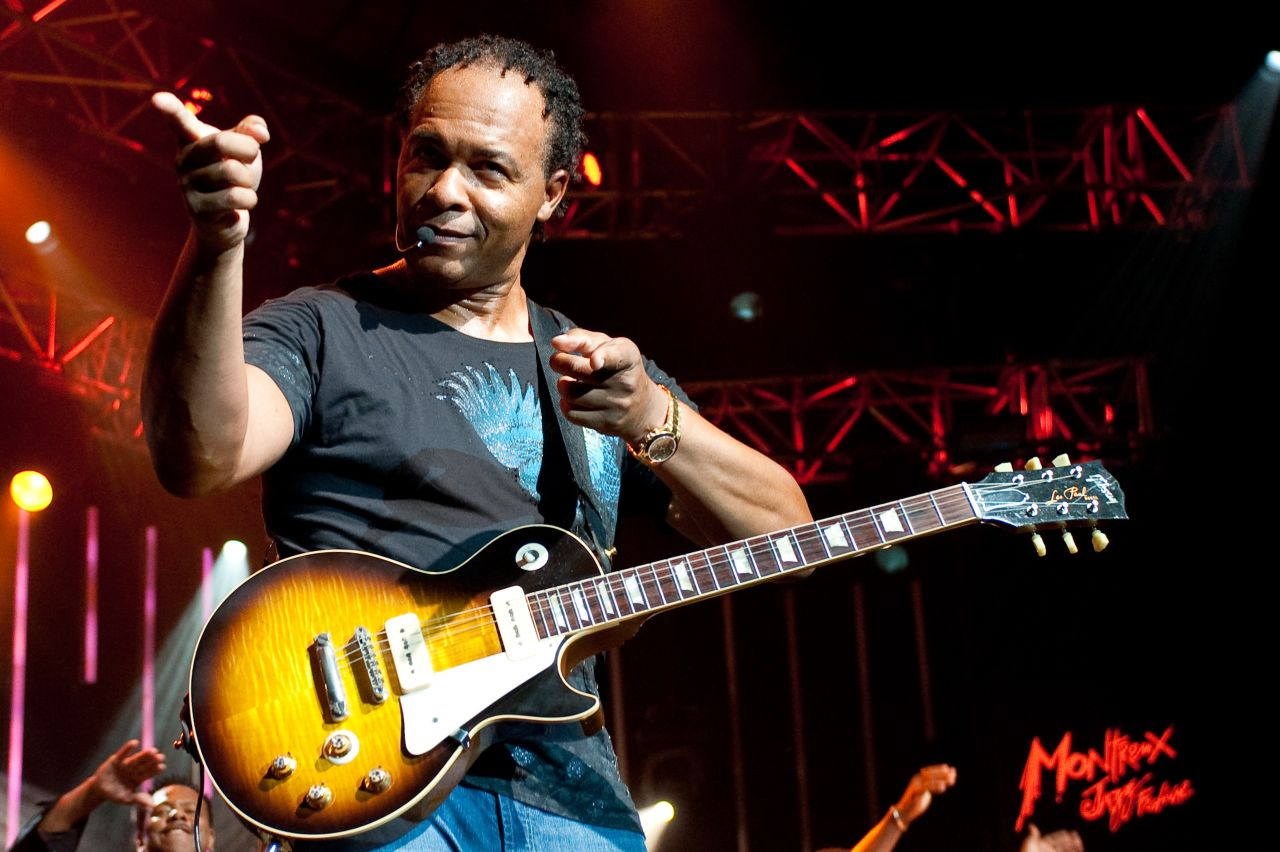
Parker at the Montreux Jazz Festival 2009, Montreux, Switzerland

Parker also played guitar, wrote songs or produced for Cheryl Lynn ("In the Night", "Shake It Up Tonight", 1981), Michael Henderson (1980), New Edition ("Mr. Telephone Man", 1984), Boz Scaggs (1977, 1980), Randy Hall (1984), Deniece Williams, and Diana Ross (1983). He performed guitar on several songs on La Toya Jackson's 1980 debut album. He also sang the theme tune on 1984’s television series Pryor's Place featuring Richard Pryor. In 1989, Run-D.M.C. performed a rap for the movie Ghostbusters II that contained elements of Parker's 1984 hit. 1989 also saw Parker work with actor Jack Wagner (General Hospital) on an album for MCA Records that was eventually shelved and never released. A single from the Wagner sessions, "Wish You Were Mine", featuring an intro rap by Parker, was released on a 1990 MCA promotional sampler CD.

In July 2006, Parker released a new CD titled I'm Free.

In 2014, he was invited by producer Gerry Gallagher to record with Latin rock musicians El Chicano, as well as Alphonse Mouzon, Brian Auger, Alex Ligertwood, Siedah Garrett, Walfredo Reyes Jr., Spencer Davis, Lenny Castro, Vikki Carr, Pete Escovedo, Peter Michael Escovedo, Jessy J, Marcos J. Reyes, Salvador Santana, and David Paich.

Parker is also the founder and owner of the Los Angeles–based recording facility Ameraycan Recording Studios. Parker received a star in the Hollywood Walk of Fame in 2014.

In July 2016, Parker performed on the ABC network's television show Greatest Hits.

In 2022, Parker competed in season eight of The Masked Singer as "Sir Bug a Boo". After being eliminated on "Fright Night" alongside the forfeiting of Linda Blair as "Scarecrow", he performed the Ghostbusters theme as an encore.

=== Ghostbusters theme song lawsuit ===
In 1984, Huey Lewis sued Columbia Pictures and Parker, stating that the melody to the Ghostbusters theme song infringed on the copyright of the Huey Lewis and the News song "I Want a New Drug", which had been released on their album Sports the previous year. The three parties reached a settlement in 1995 which forbade them from revealing any information that was not included in a press release they jointly issued at the time. In March 2001, Parker filed a suit against Lewis for breaching the part of the settlement which prohibited either side from speaking about it publicly.

=== Music videos ===
Parker was one of the first black artists to venture into the then-fledgling world of music videos. In 1978, Hollywood producer Thom Eubank produced several music videos of songs from Raydio's first, eponymous album on Arista Records. The single "Jack & Jill" was the first released to air on Wolfman Jack's Saturday night television show, The Midnight Special. The music videos were also transferred to film and projected in movie theaters all over Europe. He also made two different videos for his hit "The Other Woman". The first was Halloween-themed and centered around a haunted castle with dancing corpses and vampires. The second was more performance-oriented, with Parker performing the song against an outer space background with backup singers. Parker's "Ghostbusters" video, helmed by the film's director, Ivan Reitman, was one of the first movie-themed videos to find success on MTV.

== Acting ==
In addition to Uptown Saturday Night, Parker also made acting appearances on the sitcom Gimme a Break!, the CBS Saturday morning kids' show Pryor's Place (for which Parker appeared in the opening title sequence singing the theme song), two episodes of Berrenger's (1985), Charlie Barnett's Terms of Enrollment (1986) (V) aka Terms of Enrollment (USA: short title), Disorderlies (1987), Enemy Territory (1987). He was also a production assistant for the film Fly by Night (1993). He made guest appearances on 21 Jump Street and Kids Incorporated. In early 2009, Parker appeared in a television advertisement for 118 118, a British directory enquiries provider. This featured Parker singing a 118-specific version of the Ghostbusters theme song.

On April 15, 2009, Parker's 118 theme song was made available as a downloadable ringtone from the 118 118 mobile website. In 2014, Parker appeared in the fifth episode of the first season of NBC's romantic comedy television series A to Z, singing the "Ghostbusters" theme song for a Halloween party. Parker was highlighted on TV One's series Unsung, in the fifth season.

Ray Parker Jr. has been married to Elaine Parker since June 12, 1994. They have four sons together.

== Discography ==
For Ray Parker Jr.'s releases with Raydio, see Raydio discography.

=== Solo studio albums ===
| Year | Title | Peak chart positions | | | | | | Certifications (sales thresholds) | Record label |
| Year | Title | US Pop | US R&B | US Jazz | US Con. Jazz | AUS | UK Pop | Certifications (sales thresholds) | Record label |
|---|---|---|---|---|---|---|---|---|---|
| 1982 | The Other Woman | 11 | 1 | — | — | 27 | — | US: Gold | Arista |
| 1983 | Woman Out of Control | 45 | 18 | — | — | — | — | — | Arista |
| 1985 | Sex and the Single Man | 65 | 48 | — | — | — | — | — | Arista |
| 1987 | After Dark | 86 | 27 | — | — | — | 40 | — | Geffen |
| 1991 | I Love You Like You Are | — | 97 | — | — | — | — | — | MCA |
| 2006 | I'm Free | — | — | 45 | 25 | — | — | — | Raydio Music |
"—" denotes releases that did not chart or were not released in that territory.

=== Compilation albums ===
| Year | Title | Peak chart positions | | | | | | | Certifications (sales thresholds) | Record label |
| Year | Title | US Pop | US R&B | AUS | CAN | NZ | SWE | SWI | Certifications (sales thresholds) | Record label |
|---|---|---|---|---|---|---|---|---|---|---|
| 1982 | Greatest Hits | 51 | 17 | — | — | — | — | — | — | Arista |
| 1984 | Chartbusters | 60 | 36 | 84 | 89 | 49 | 36 | 16 | US: Gold | Arista |
| 1990 | The Best of Ray Parker Jr. & Raydio | — | — | — | — | — | — | — | — | Arista |
| 1993 | Greatest Hits | — | — | — | — | — | — | — | — | Arista |
| 1998 | The Best of Ray Parker Jr. | — | — | — | — | — | — | — | — | BMG/Arista |
| 1999 | Ghostbusters: The Encore Collection | — | — | — | — | — | — | — | — | BMG |
| 2000 | The Heritage Collection | — | — | — | — | — | — | — | — | Arista |
| 2011 | S.O.U.L. | — | — | — | — | — | — | — | — | Sony Music |
"—" denotes releases that did not chart or were not released in that territory.

=== Solo singles ===
| Year | Title | Peak chart positions | | | | | | | | | | Album |
| Year | Title | US | AUS | BEL | CAN | GER | IRE | NLD | NZ | SWI | UK | Album |
|---|---|---|---|---|---|---|---|---|---|---|---|---|
| 1982 | "The Other Woman" | 4 | 1 | — | 7 | — | — | — | 4 | — | — | The Other Woman |
| 1982 | "Let Me Go" | 38 | — | — | — | — | — | — | — | — | — | The Other Woman |
| 1982 | "It's Our Own Affair" | 106 | — | — | — | — | — | — | — | — | — | The Other Woman |
| 1982 | "Bad Boy" | 35 | 37 | — | 22 | — | — | — | — | — | — | Greatest Hits |
| 1983 | "The People Next Door" | — | — | — | — | — | — | — | — | — | — | Greatest Hits |
| 1983 | "I Still Can't Get Over Loving You" | 12 | 89 | — | 26 | — | — | — | 48 | — | — | Woman Out of Control |
| 1984 | "Woman Out of Control" | — | — | — | — | — | — | — | — | — | — | Woman Out of Control |
| 1984 | "In the Heat of the Night" | — | — | — | — | — | — | — | — | — | — | Woman Out of Control |
| 1984 | "Ghostbusters" | 1 | 2 | 1 | 1 | 4 | 4 | 5 | 2 | 3 | 2 | Ghostbusters / Chartbusters |
| 1984 | "Jamie" | 14 | — | — | 43 | — | — | — | 16 | — | — | Chartbusters |
| 1985 | "I've Been Diggin' You" | — | — | 38 | — | — | — | — | — | — | — | Chartbusters |
| 1985 | "Girls Are More Fun" | 34 | — | — | 32 | — | — | — | — | — | 46 | Sex and the Single Man |
| 1985 | "One Sided Love Affair" | — | — | — | — | — | — | — | — | — | — | Sex and the Single Man |
| 1986 | "One Sunny Day" / "Dueling Bikes from Quicksilver" (with Helen Terry) | 96 | — | — | — | — | — | — | — | — | — | Quicksilver |
| 1987 | "I Don't Think That Man Should Sleep Alone" | 68 | — | — | — | — | 18 | 47 | — | — | 13 | After Dark |
| 1987 | "Over You" (with Natalie Cole) | — | — | — | — | — | — | — | — | — | 65 | After Dark |
| 1987 | "The Past" (with Natalie Cole) | — | — | — | — | — | — | — | — | — | — | After Dark |
| 1990 | "All I'm Missing Is You" (credited as Glenn Medeiros featuring Ray Parker Jr.) | 32 | — | — | — | — | — | — | — | — | — | Glenn Medeiros |
| 1991 | "She Needs to Get Some" | — | 145 | — | — | — | — | — | — | — | — | I Love You Like You Are |
| 1991 | "Girl I Saw You" | — | — | — | — | — | — | — | — | — | — | I Love You Like You Are |
"—" denotes releases that did not chart or were not released in that territory.

== Filmography ==
| Year | Title | Role | Notes | Ref. |
|---|---|---|---|---|
| 1974 | Uptown Saturday Night | Guitarist | Appeared in the church picnic scene | |
| 1987 | Enemy Territory | Will Jackson | Supporting role in action film | |
