= A Woman Needs Love (Just Like You Do) =

Single by Ray Parker Jr. & Raydio

from the album A Woman Needs Love
- B-side: "So Into You"
- Released: February 21, 1981
- Genre: Pop, R&B
- Length: 3:46 (7"); 4:07 (album version)
- Label: Arista
- Songwriter: Ray Parker Jr.
- Producer: Ray Parker Jr.

Ray Parker Jr. & Raydio singles chronology
"Can't Keep You from Cryin'" (1980)	"A Woman Needs Love (Just Like You Do)" (1981)	"Still in the Groove" (1981)

Music video
- "A Woman Needs Love (Just Like You Do)" on YouTube

"A Woman Needs Love (Just Like You Do)" is a 1981 song recorded by American R&B vocalist and songwriter Ray Parker Jr., along with his group, Raydio. It led their 1981 album, A Woman Needs Love, the last Parker recorded with Raydio.

== Background ==
The song was written as an antithetical answer to the earlier Raydio hit, "Jack and Jill," also written and performed by Ray Parker Jr. "Jack and Jill" is written from "Jack's" perspective of being neglected, just as "A Woman Needs Love" is written from "Jill's" perspective, as indicated by the lyrics, "by the time poor Jack returned up the hill, somebody else had been loving Jill."

== Chart performance ==
The song was a hit on both the Billboard pop and soul charts in early 1981. It was Parker's first song to hit number-one on the R&B chart, and also reached number four on the Billboard Hot 100. It is ranked as the 16th biggest U.S. hit of 1981.

=== Weekly charts ===
Chart (1981)	Peak position
Australia (Kent Music Report)	22
Belgium (Ultratop 50 Flanders)	13
Canada RPM Top Singles	8
Canada CBC Top Singles	8
Netherlands (Dutch Top 40)	7
Netherlands (Single Top 100)	9
New Zealand (Recorded Music NZ)	10
South Africa (Springbok Radio)	16
US Billboard Hot 100	4
US Adult Contemporary (Billboard)	11
US Hot R&B/Hip-Hop Songs (Billboard)	1

=== Year-end charts ===
Chart (1981)	Position
Canada	61
Netherlands (Dutch Top 40)	92
US Billboard Hot 100	16

== Personnel ==
=== Raydio ===
- Arnell Carmichael – backing vocals
- Ray Parker Jr. – lead vocals, guitars, bass

=== Additional personnel ===
- Jack Ashford – tambourine
- Michael Boddicker – synthesizers
- Ollie E. Brown – percussion
- Paul Jackson Jr. – guitars
- Sylvester Rivers – piano, synthesizers
- Larry Tolbert – drums
