= Raydio =

American funk and R&B vocal group

- Origin: Detroit, Michigan, U.S.
- Genres: R&B, funk, disco
- Years active: 1977–1981, 2014–present
- Label: Arista
- Members: Arnell Carmichael; Giovanni Rogers
- Past members: Ray Parker Jr. Jerry Knight; Darren Carmichael; Charles Fearing; Larry Tolbert; James Carmichael; Vincent Bonham
- Website: Raydio

Raydio (known as Ray Parker Jr. & Raydio 1980-81) is an American funk and R&B vocal group formed in 1977 by Ray Parker Jr., with Vincent Bonham, Jerry Knight, and Arnell Carmichael. In 1978 Charles Julian Fearing and Larry "Fatback" Tolbert joined the band, along with Darren Carmichael.

== Career ==
=== 1970s and Raydio ===
After securing a record deal, the group scored their first big hit in early 1978 with "Jack and Jill", which was taken from their self-titled debut album. The song peaked at no. 8 on the U.S. Billboard Hot 100 chart, and reached no. 11 in the UK Singles Chart, earning a gold record in the process. "Is This a Love Thing" peaked at no. 27 in the UK in August 1978. Their next successful follow-up hit, "You Can't Change That" was released in 1979, and lifted from their Rock On album. The single reached no. 9 on the Billboard chart that year. In September 1979, they participated in an anti-nuclear concert at Madison Square Garden. Their performance of "You Can't Change That" at this show appears on the No Nukes album.

=== The 1980s and "Ray Parker Jr. and Raydio" ===
By late 1980, by which point Knight had left to pursue a solo career, the group had become known as Ray Parker Jr. and Raydio, and they released two more albums: Two Places at the Same Time (1980), and A Woman Needs Love (1981). These spawned another two top 40 singles ("Two Places at the Same Time" - no. 30 in 1980; and "That Old Song" - no. 21 in 1981). Their last, and biggest hit, "A Woman Needs Love (Just Like You Do)," was released in 1981 and peaked at no. 4 on the Billboard Hot 100.

After acknowledging the band had come to a crossroads and with Parker wanting to go solo, they quietly broke up in 1981.

=== Solo careers ===
Parker then started his solo career, scoring six top 40 hits in the 1980s, including "The Other Woman" (Pop No. 4), and "Ghostbusters". The latter song was the title track of the box office hit film Ghostbusters. The single stayed at no. 1 for three weeks on the Billboard Hot 100 in 1984.

Knight went on to have a moderately successful solo career of his own, later forming Ollie & Jerry, with Ollie E. Brown (who had been a session drummer on all of Raydio's albums) in the mid-1980s. Their two biggest hits also came from soundtracks: "Breakin'... There's No Stopping Us" was the theme to the motion picture Breakin', and reached no. 9 on the Hot 100 and no. 1 on the Hot Dance Club Play chart; their second single "Electric Boogaloo" (from the movie Breakin' 2: Electric Boogaloo), did not enter the Hot 100, but climbed to no. 43 on the dance chart.

In 2014, original members Arnell Carmichael and Vincent Bonham revived Raydio, recruiting two new members, James Carmichael formerly of the Arista group Q.T. Hush, and up-and-coming young singer Giovanni Rogers. They toured with Average White Band, War, Switch, DeBarge, among several other major tours.

Vincent Bonham died in March 2024, at age 67.

== Discography ==
All albums and singles listed below were issued on Arista Records. For Ray Parker Jr.'s solo releases. see Ray Parker Jr. discography.

=== Studio albums ===
Year	Title	Peak chart positions					Certifications (sales thresholds)
Year	Title	US Pop	US R&B	AUS	CAN	SWE	Certifications (sales thresholds)
1978	Raydio	27	8	43	29	—	Gold: RIAA
1979	Rock On	45	4	65	42	—	Gold: RIAA
1980	Two Places at the Same Time	33	6	—	—	40	Gold: RIAA
1981	A Woman Needs Love	13	1	—	—	—	Gold: RIAA
"—" denotes releases that did not chart or were not released in that territory.

=== Singles ===
Year	Title	Peak chart positions											Album	Certifications
Year	Title	US Pop	US R&B	US A/C	US Dan	AUS	BEL	CAN	IRE	NLD	NZ	UK	Album	Certifications
1978	"Jack and Jill"	8	5	—	—	4	14	5	—	24	4	11	Raydio	Gold: RIAA
1978	"Is This a Love Thing"	—	20	—	—	—	—	—	17	—	—	27	Raydio	
1978	"Honey I'm Rich"	—	43	—	—	—	—	—	—	—	—	—	Raydio	
1979	"You Can't Change That"	9	3	25	—	6	17	9	—	12	12	—	Rock On	
1979	"More Than One Way to Love a Woman"	—	25	—	—	—	—	—	—	—	—	—	Rock On	
1980	"Two Places at the Same Time"	30	6	34	—	—	—	93	—	—	—	—	Two Places at the Same Time	
1980	"For Those Who Like to Groove"	—	14	—	23	—	—	—	—	—	—	—	Two Places at the Same Time	
1980	"Can't Keep You from Cryin'"	—	57	—	—	—	—	—	—	—	—	—	Two Places at the Same Time	
1981	"A Woman Needs Love (Just Like You Do)"	4	1	11	—	47	16	8	—	9	10	—	A Woman Needs Love	
1981	"Still in the Groove"	—	—	—	35	—	—	—	—	—	—	—	A Woman Needs Love	
1981	"That Old Song"	21	26	7	—	—	—	—	—	—	—	—	A Woman Needs Love	
1981	"It's Your Night"	—	73	—	—	—	—	—	—	—	—	—	A Woman Needs Love	
"—" denotes releases that did not chart or were not released in that territory.
